= 2019 Michigan Wolverines football team =

American college football season

2019 Michigan Wolverines football

Citrus Bowl, L 16–35 vs. Alabama
- Conference: Big Ten Conference
- East Division

Ranking
- Coaches: No. 19
- AP: No. 18
- Record: 9–4 (6–3 Big Ten)
- Head coach: Jim Harbaugh (5th season)
- Offensive coordinator: Josh Gattis (1st season)
- Offensive scheme: Pro spread
- Defensive coordinator: Don Brown (4th season)
- Base defense: 4–3
- MVP: Shea Patterson
- Captains: Ben Bredeson; Khaleke Hudson; Carlo Kemp
- Home stadium: Michigan Stadium

Uniform
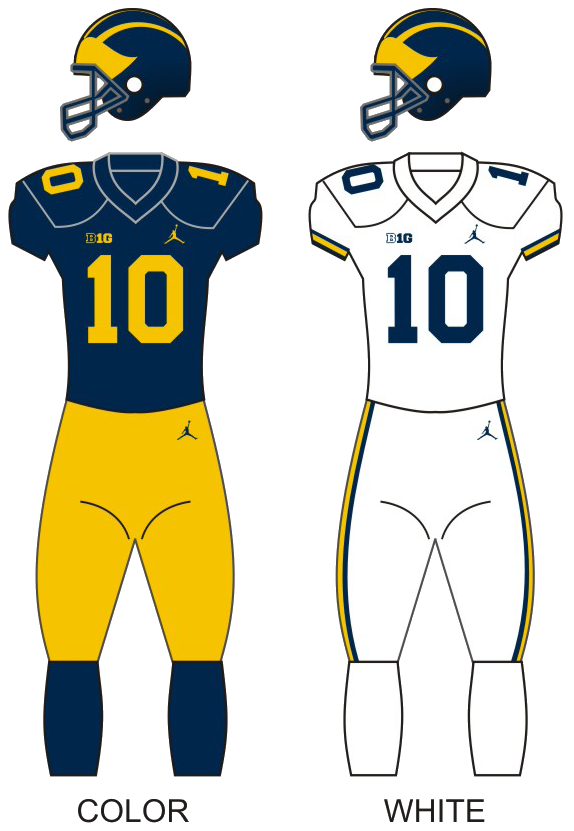

2019 Big Ten Conference football standings
	Conf.			Overall
Team	W		L	W		L
East Division
No. 3 Ohio State xy$^	9	–	0	13	–	1
No. 9 Penn State	7	–	2	11	–	2
No. 18 Michigan	6	–	3	9	–	4
Indiana	5	–	4	8	–	5
Michigan State	4	–	5	7	–	6
Maryland	1	–	8	3	–	9
Rutgers	0	–	9	2	–	10
West Division
No. 11 Wisconsin xy	7	–	2	10	–	4
No. 10 Minnesota x	7	–	2	11	–	2
No. 15 Iowa	6	–	3	10	–	3
Illinois	4	–	5	6	–	7
Purdue	3	–	6	4	–	8
Nebraska	3	–	6	5	–	7
Northwestern	1	–	8	3	–	9
Championship: Ohio State 34, Wisconsin 21
^ – College Football Playoff participant; $ – Conference champion; x – Division champion/co-champions; y – Championship game participant; Rankings from AP Poll

The 2019 Michigan Wolverines football team represented the University of Michigan in the sport of college football during the 2019 NCAA Division I FBS football season. The Wolverines competed in the East Division of the Big Ten Conference and played their home games at Michigan Stadium in Ann Arbor, Michigan. Michigan was coached by Jim Harbaugh, who was in his fifth season.

Coming off a Peach Bowl appearance in 2018, Michigan began the year as slight favorites to win the Big Ten Conference, and were ranked seventh in the preseason AP Poll. Under the leadership of new offensive coordinator Josh Gattis, the Wolverine offense struggled in the early part of the season. In the second game of the year, Michigan escaped with an overtime win against Army. Two weeks later, the team was soundly defeated by Wisconsin, 35–14. Analysts saw as a turning point for the offense its second half performance against then-No. 7 Penn State, but Michigan's comeback attempt failed as it lost 28–21. The team defeated rivals Notre Dame and Michigan State in blowouts at home, but ended the regular season with a loss to Ohio State, its eighth straight loss in the series. Michigan was invited to the Citrus Bowl to play Alabama, where it lost 35–16 to end the year at 9–4, 6–3 in Big Ten play.

The offense was led by senior quarterback Shea Patterson, who became just the third Wolverine passer to ever eclipse the 3,000 yards passing mark. Offensive linemen Ben Bredeson and Jon Runyan Jr. were both named first-team all-conference. The defense was led by first-team all-conference cornerback Lavert Hill, as well as second-team selections Kwity Paye and Josh Uche on the defensive line, and linebacker Khaleke Hudson.

== Preseason ==
=== Coaching changes ===
Michigan defensive line coach Greg Mattison and linebackers coach Al Washington both left to take jobs at Ohio State in early January 2019. Michigan announced the hiring of Josh Gattis as offensive coordinator on January 10. He previously was the wide receivers coach and co-offensive coordinator at Alabama for one season. Head coach Jim Harbaugh also announced the hiring of former Boston College co-defensive coordinator Anthony Campanile as a defensive assistant and former Arizona State assistant Shaun Nua to be the new defensive line coach. Assistant head coach and passing game coordinator Pep Hamilton left the team in February. He had been one of the nation's highest paid assistants in 2018.

=== Player news ===
The team released a statement in February 2019 that running back Chris Evans, who was set to be the Wolverines' leading returning rusher, was no longer with the program. Evans announced on Twitter that he had "academic issues" and planned to continue his career at Michigan. In June, Coach Harbaugh confirmed that Evans would be suspended for the 2019 season.

=== Recruiting ===
Michigan's 2019 recruiting class consisted of 26 signees, including eight that enrolled early. The class was ranked as the nation's 8th best by 247Sports and ESPN, and 10th by Rivals. It was the highest ranked class in the Big Ten Conference by all three recruiting services.

College recruiting information (2019)
Name	Hometown	School	Height	Weight	Commit date
Erick All; TE	Fairfield, Ohio	Fairfield High School	6 ft 4 in (1.93 m)	225 lb (102 kg)	Jun 24, 2018
Erick All; TE	Recruit ratings: Rivals: 247Sports: ESPN:				
Karsen Barnhart; OG	Paw Paw, Michigan	Paw Paw High School	6 ft 4 in (1.93 m)	273 lb (124 kg)	Apr 30, 2018
Karsen Barnhart; OG	Recruit ratings: Rivals: 247Sports: ESPN:				
Zach Carpenter; OG	Cincinnati, Ohio	Archbishop Moeller High School	6 ft 5 in (1.96 m)	310 lb (140 kg)	May 30, 2018
Zach Carpenter; OG	Recruit ratings: Rivals: 247Sports: ESPN:				
Zach Charbonnet; RB	Westlake Village, California	Oaks Christian School	6 ft 2 in (1.88 m)	215 lb (98 kg)	Jun 24, 2018
Zach Charbonnet; RB	Recruit ratings: Rivals: 247Sports: ESPN:				
Daxton Hill; S	Tulsa, Oklahoma	Booker T Washington High School	6 ft 0 in (1.83 m)	186 lb (84 kg)	Dec 19, 2018
Daxton Hill; S	Recruit ratings: Rivals: 247Sports: ESPN:				
Christopher Hinton; DT	Norcross, Georgia	Greater Atlanta Christian School	6 ft 4 in (1.93 m)	280 lb (130 kg)	Aug 23, 2017
Christopher Hinton; DT	Recruit ratings: Rivals: 247Sports: ESPN:				
Giles Jackson; WR	Oakley, California	Freedom High School	5 ft 8 in (1.73 m)	175 lb (79 kg)	Sep 10, 2018
Giles Jackson; WR	Recruit ratings: Rivals: 247Sports: ESPN:				
Cornelius Johnson; WR	Greenwich, Connecticut	Brunswick School	6 ft 3 in (1.91 m)	195 lb (88 kg)	Dec 19, 2018
Cornelius Johnson; WR	Recruit ratings: Rivals: 247Sports: ESPN:				
George Johnson III; ATH	Stuart, Florida	Martin County High School	5 ft 11 in (1.80 m)	180 lb (82 kg)	Jun 26, 2018
George Johnson III; ATH	Recruit ratings: Rivals: 247Sports: ESPN:				
Quinten Johnson; S	Washington, DC	St. John's College High School	5 ft 11 in (1.80 m)	190 lb (86 kg)	Jul 3, 2018
Quinten Johnson; S	Recruit ratings: Rivals: 247Sports: ESPN:				
Trente Jones; OT	Loganville, Georgia	Loganville High School	6 ft 6 in (1.98 m)	282 lb (128 kg)	Feb 21, 2018
Trente Jones; OT	Recruit ratings: Rivals: 247Sports: ESPN:				
Trevor Keegan; OT	Crystal Lake, Illinois	Crystal Lake South High School	6 ft 6 in (1.98 m)	310 lb (140 kg)	Dec 14, 2018
Trevor Keegan; OT	Recruit ratings: Rivals: 247Sports: ESPN:				
Quintel Kent; WR	Lakewood, Ohio	St. Edward High School	6 ft 0 in (1.83 m)	170 lb (77 kg)	Aug 4, 2018
Quintel Kent; WR	Recruit ratings: Rivals: 247Sports: ESPN:				
Cade McNamara; QB	Reno, Nevada	Damonte Ranch High School	6 ft 1 in (1.85 m)	206 lb (93 kg)	Mar 16, 2018
Cade McNamara; QB	Recruit ratings: Rivals: 247Sports: ESPN:				
Mike Morris; DE	Delray Beach, Florida	American Heritage High School	6 ft 5 in (1.96 m)	255 lb (116 kg)	Sep 9, 2018
Mike Morris; DE	Recruit ratings: Rivals: 247Sports: ESPN:				
Gabe Newburg; DE	Clayton, Ohio	Northmont High School	6 ft 5 in (1.96 m)	230 lb (100 kg)	Apr 2, 2018
Gabe Newburg; DE	Recruit ratings: Rivals: 247Sports: ESPN:				
David Ojabo; DE	Blairstown, New Jersey	Blair Academy	6 ft 4 in (1.93 m)	240 lb (110 kg)	Jul 2, 2018
David Ojabo; DE	Recruit ratings: Rivals: 247Sports: ESPN:				
Jalen Perry; CB	Dacula, Georgia	Dacula High School	6 ft 1 in (1.85 m)	188 lb (85 kg)	Nov 19, 2018
Jalen Perry; CB	Recruit ratings: Rivals: 247Sports: ESPN:				
Nolan Rumler; OG	Akron, Ohio	Archbishop Hoban High School	6 ft 4 in (1.93 m)	290 lb (130 kg)	Jul 29, 2017
Nolan Rumler; OG	Recruit ratings: Rivals: 247Sports: ESPN:				
Mike Sainristil; CB	Everett, Massachusetts	Everett High School	5 ft 10 in (1.78 m)	175 lb (79 kg)	Nov 4, 2018
Mike Sainristil; CB	Recruit ratings: Rivals: 247Sports: ESPN:				
Mazi Smith; DT	Grand Rapids, Michigan	East Kentwood	6 ft 3 in (1.91 m)	290 lb (130 kg)	Jun 24, 2018
Mazi Smith; DT	Recruit ratings: Rivals: 247Sports: ESPN:				
Anthony Solomon; LB	Fort Lauderdale, Florida	St. Thomas Aquinas High School	6 ft 0 in (1.83 m)	190 lb (86 kg)	Dec 16, 2018
Anthony Solomon; LB	Recruit ratings: Rivals: 247Sports: ESPN:				
Jack Stewart; OT	New Canaan, Connecticut	New Canaan High School	6 ft 5 in (1.96 m)	280 lb (130 kg)	Apr 16, 2018
Jack Stewart; OT	Recruit ratings: Rivals: 247Sports: ESPN:				
Charles Thomas; LB	Oakdale, Connecticut	St. Thomas More Prep School	6 ft 0 in (1.83 m)	222 lb (101 kg)	Jun 24, 2017
Charles Thomas; LB	Recruit ratings: Rivals: 247Sports: ESPN:				
D. J. Turner; CB	Bradenton, Florida	IMG Academy	6 ft 0 in (1.83 m)	165 lb (75 kg)	Jun 25, 2018
D. J. Turner; CB	Recruit ratings: Rivals: 247Sports: ESPN:				
Joey Velazquez; S	Columbus, Ohio	St.Francis De Sales High School	6 ft 0 in (1.83 m)	205 lb (93 kg)	Jun 22, 2018
Joey Velazquez; S	Recruit ratings: Rivals: 247Sports: ESPN:				
Overall recruit ranking: Rivals: 10 247Sports: 8 ESPN: 8
Note: In many cases, Scout, Rivals, 247Sports, On3, and ESPN may conflict in their listings of height and weight.; In these cases, the average was taken. ESPN grades are on a 100-point scale.; Sources: "2019 Michigan football commitments". Rivals.; "2019 Michigan football commitments". ESPN.; "2019 Team Ranking". Rivals.com.; "2019 Michigan football commitments". 247Sports.

=== Preseason Big Ten poll ===
Although the Big Ten Conference has not held an official preseason poll since 2010, Cleveland.com has polled sports journalists representing all member schools as a de facto preseason media poll since 2011. For the 2019 poll, Michigan was voted as the favorite to win both the East Division and the Big Ten Championship Game.

== Schedule ==
Date	Time	Opponent	Rank	Site	TV	Result	Attendance	Source
August 31	7:30 p.m.	Middle Tennessee*	No. 7	Michigan Stadium; Ann Arbor, MI	BTN	W 40–21	110,811	
September 7	12:00 p.m.	Army*	No. 7	Michigan Stadium; Ann Arbor, MI	FOX	W 24–21 ^{2OT}	111,747	
September 21	12:00 p.m.	at No. 13 Wisconsin	No. 11	Camp Randall Stadium; Madison, WI	FOX	L 14–35	80,245	
September 28	12:00 p.m.	Rutgers	No. 20	Michigan Stadium; Ann Arbor, MI	BTN	W 52–0	110,662	
October 5	12:00 p.m.	No. 14 Iowa^{†}	No. 19	Michigan Stadium; Ann Arbor, MI	FOX	W 10–3	111,519	
October 12	12:00 p.m.	at Illinois	No. 16	Memorial Stadium; Champaign, IL (rivalry)	ABC	W 42–25	37,275	
October 19	7:30 p.m.	at No. 7 Penn State	No. 16	Beaver Stadium; State College, PA (rivalry, College Gameday)	ABC	L 21–28	110,669	
October 26	7:30 p.m.	No. 8 Notre Dame*	No. 19	Michigan Stadium; Ann Arbor, MI (rivalry)	ABC	W 45–14	111,909	
November 2	12:00 p.m.	at Maryland	No. 14	Maryland Stadium; College Park, MD	ABC	W 38–7	40,701	
November 16	12:00 p.m.	Michigan State	No. 15	Michigan Stadium; Ann Arbor, MI (rivalry)	FOX	W 44–10	111,496	
November 23	3:30 p.m.	at Indiana	No. 13	Memorial Stadium; Bloomington, IN	ESPN	W 39–14	43,671	
November 30	12:00 p.m.	No. 1 Ohio State	No. 13	Michigan Stadium; Ann Arbor, MI (The Game, Big Noon Kickoff)	FOX	L 27–56	112,071	
January 1, 2020	1:00 p.m.	vs. No. 13 Alabama*	No. 14	Camping World Stadium; Orlando, FL (Citrus Bowl, SEC Nation)	ABC	L 16–35	59,746	
*Non-conference game; ^{†}Homecoming; Rankings from AP Poll and CFP Rankings (after November 5) released prior to game; All times are in Eastern time

== Rankings ==
Ranking movements Legend: ██ Increase in ranking ██ Decrease in ranking
	Week																
Poll	Pre	1	2	3	4	5	6	7	8	9	10	11	12	13	14	15	Final
AP	7	7	10	11	20	19	16	16	19	14	14	14	12	10	17	17	18
Coaches	7	7	10	10	20	18	16	16	20	15	14	14	12	11	18	17	19
CFP	Not released										14	15	13	13	14	14	Not released

== Radio ==
Radio coverage for all games will be broadcast statewide on The Michigan IMG Sports Network and on Sirius XM Satellite Radio. The radio announcers are Jim Brandstatter with play-by-play, Dan Dierdorf with color commentary, and Doug Karsch with sideline reports.

== Game summaries ==
=== Middle Tennessee ===
Middle Tennessee at Michigan

Team	1	2	3	4	Total
Blue Raiders	7	7	0	7	21
• No. 7 Wolverines	10	17	6	7	40

- Date: August 31
- Location: Michigan Stadium
  Ann Arbor, MI
- Game start: 7:40 EDT
- Elapsed time: 3:26
- Game attendance: 110,811
- Game weather: Mid 60s, Cloudy, S 5–10 MPH
- Referee: Jerry McGinn
- TV announcers (BTN): Kevin Kugler (play-by-play), Matt Millen (analyst), Rick Pizzo (sideline)

Scoring summary
1	12:52	MTSU	Asher O'Hara 18-yard run (Crews Holt kick)	MTSU 7–0
1	7:37	MICH	Jake Moody 34-yard field goal	MTSU 7–3
1	0:21	MICH	Tarik Black 36-yard pass from Shea Patterson (Quinn Nordin kick)	MICH 10–7
2	12:54	MICH	Nico Collins 28-yard pass from Shea Patterson (Quinn Nordin kick)	MICH 17–7
2	7:08	MICH	Sean McKeon 28-yard pass from Shea Patterson (Quinn Nordin kick)	MICH 24–7
2	2:12	MTSU	Jarrin Pierce 2-yard pass from Asher O'Hara (Crews Holt kick)	MICH 24–14
2	0:05	MICH	Jake Moody 27-yard field goal	MICH 27–14
3	3:07	MICH	Dylan McCaffrey 6-yard run (two-point conversion failed)	MICH 33–14
4	6:37	MICH	Ben VanSumeren 1-yard run (Quinn Nordin kick)	MICH 40–14
4	1:06	MTSU	Jimmy Marshall 59-yard pass from Asher O'Hara (Crews Holt kick)	MICH 40–21

To open the season, Michigan hosted the Middle Tennessee Blue Raiders.

Michigan defeated Middle Tennessee 40–21. Middle Tennessee opened the scoring in the first quarter with an 18-yard touchdown run from Asher O'Hara, to take its first and only lead of the game. Michigan responded with a 34-yard field goal by Jake Moody, and a 36-yard touchdown pass from Shea Patterson to Tarik Black to take the lead. Michigan scored 17 points in the second quarter on a 28-yard touchdown pass from Patterson to Nico Collins, a 28-yard touchdown pass from Patterson to Sean McKeon, and a 27-yard field goal by Moody. Middle Tennessee responded with a two-yard touchdown pass from O'Hara to Jarrin Pierce, which made the score 27–14 in favor of Michigan at half-time. Michigan extended its lead in the third quarter on a six-yard touchdown run from Dylan McCaffrey. The teams exchanged touchdowns in the fourth quarter on a one-yard touchdown run from Ben VanSumeren for Michigan, and a 59-yard touchdown pass from O'Hara to Jimmy Marshall for Middle Tennessee.

Freshman running back Zach Charbonnet became the first Wolverine true freshman to start at tailback in a season opener since Sam McGuffie in 2008, and just the fourth player to do since 1944.

=== Army ===
Army at Michigan

Team	1	2	3	4	OT	2OT	Total
Black Knights	7	7	0	0	7	0	21
• No. 7 Wolverines	7	0	7	0	7	3	24

- Date: September 7
- Location: Michigan Stadium
  Ann Arbor, MI
- Game start: 12:01 EDT
- Elapsed time: 3:35
- Game attendance: 111,747
- Game weather: Mid 70s, Sunny, NW 10–15 MPH
- Referee: Ron Snodgrass
- TV announcers (Fox): Gus Johnson (play-by-play), Joel Klatt (analyst), Jenny Taft (sideline)

Scoring summary
1	5:01	ARMY	Sandon McCoy 1-yard run (Cole Talley kick)	ARMY 7–0
1	0:24	MICH	Zach Charbonnet 2-yard run (Quinn Nordin kick)	Tied 7–7
2	2:51	ARMY	Kelvin Hopkins Jr. 1-yard run (Cole Talley kick)	ARMY 14–7
3	0:24	MICH	Zach Charbonnet 1-yard run (Jake Moody kick)	Tied 14–14
OT	0:00	ARMY	Kelvin Hopkins Jr. 6-yard run (Cole Talley kick)	ARMY 21–14
OT	0:00	MICH	Zach Charbonnet 1-yard run (Jake Moody kick)	Tied 21–21
2OT	0:00	MICH	Jake Moody 43-yard field goal	MICH 24–21

Following its opening game against Middle Tennessee, Michigan hosted the Army Black Knights. This was the first meeting between the schools since 1962. Michigan won the previous meeting 17–7.

Michigan defeated Army 24–21 in double overtime. Army opened the scoring in the first quarter with a one-yard touchdown run from Sandon McCoy. Michigan responded with a two-yard touchdown run from Zach Charbonnet. Army regained the lead in the second quarter on a one-yard touchdown run from Kelvin Hopkins Jr., which made the score 14–7 in favor of Army at half-time. Early in the second half, Army found itself in the red zone with an opportunity to take a two-score lead, however Hopkins threw an interception to Lavert Hill. Michigan responded with a one-yard touchdown run from Charbonnet to tie the game with 2:24 remaining in the third quarter. The game was scoreless for the remainder of regulation, and freshman Army kicker Cole Talley missed the would-be game-winning 50-yard field goal as time expired, after which the game went to overtime. In overtime, Army scored on a six-yard touchdown run from Hopkins. Michigan responded with a three-yard touchdown run from Charbonnet to force double overtime. In double overtime, Michigan scored on a 43-yard field goal by Moody. On Army's ensuing possession, Hopkins was sacked by Kwity Paye and Aidan Hutchinson, and the ball was fumbled and recovered by Josh Uche to seal the victory for the Wolverines.

Freshman running back Charbonnet had his first 100-yard rushing game, and posted three touchdowns. Michigan's defense held Army to just two pass completions on five attempts. It was the fewest completions by a Wolverine opponent since Rutgers also posted two pass completions in 2016.

=== At Wisconsin ===
Michigan at Wisconsin

Team	1	2	3	4	Total
No. 11 Wolverines	0	0	8	6	14
• No. 13 Badgers	14	14	7	0	35

- Date: September 21
- Location: Camp Randall Stadium
  Madison, WI
- Game start: 11:03 CDT
- Elapsed time: 3:29
- Game attendance: 80,245
- Game weather: 70º F, Cloudy, possible rain, S 15 MPH
- Referee: Jeff Servinski
- TV announcers (Fox): Gus Johnson (play-by-play), Joel Klatt (analyst), Jenny Taft (sideline)

Scoring summary
1	8:35	WISC	Jonathan Taylor 1-yard run (Collin Larsh kick)	WISC 7–0
1	2:43	WISC	Jonathan Taylor 72-yard run (Collin Larsh kick)	WISC 14–0
2	6:40	WISC	Jack Coan 1-yard run (Collin Larsh kick)	WISC 21–0
2	0:57	WISC	Jack Coan 25-yard run (Collin Larsh kick)	WISC 28–0
3	5:13	WISC	Jack Coan 2-yard run (Collin Larsh kick)	WISC 35–0
3	5:13	MICH	Sean McKeon 6-yd pass from Shea Patterson (Shea Patterson pass to Tarik Black for two-point conversion)	WISC 35–8
4	4:56	MICH	Donovan Peoples-Jones 5-yd pass from Shea Patterson (two-point conversion failed)	WISC 35–14

After playing Army and having a bye week, Michigan traveled to Madison to face the Wisconsin Badgers in its Big Ten Conference opener. Last season, Michigan defeated Wisconsin 38–13.

Michigan lost to Wisconsin 35–14. Wisconsin scored 14 points in the first quarter on two touchdown runs from Jonathan Taylor, from one-yard and 72-yards, respectively. Wisconsin added 14 points in the second quarter on two touchdown runs from Jack Coan, from 25-yards and two-yards, respectively, which made the score 28–0 in favor of Wisconsin at half-time. Wisconsin extended its lead in the third quarter on a two-yard touchdown run from Coan. Michigan finally got on the board late in the third quarter with a six-yard touchdown pass from Shea Patterson to Sean McKeon, and a two-point conversion pass from Patterson to Tarik Black, to avoid a shutout. Michigan scored the only points of the fourth quarter on a five-yard touchdown pass from Patterson to Donovan Peoples-Jones.

=== Rutgers ===
Rutgers at Michigan

Team	1	2	3	4	Total
Scarlet Knights	0	0	0	0	0
• No. 20 Wolverines	14	10	14	14	52

- Date: September 28
- Location: Michigan Stadium
  Ann Arbor, MI
- Game start: 12:01 EDT
- Elapsed time: 3:10
- Game attendance: 110,662
- Game weather: Mid 60s, cloudy, possible rain, NW 5–10 MPH
- Referee: Larry Smith
- TV announcers (BTN): Kevin Kugler (play-by-play), Matt Millen (analyst), Rick Pizzo (sideline)

Scoring summary
1	12:52	MICH	Nico Collins 48-yard pass from Shea Patterson (Quinn Nordin kick)	MICH 7–0
1	5:07	MICH	Shea Patterson 2-yard run (Quinn Nordin kick)	MICH 14–0
2	7:33	MICH	Shea Patterson 4-yard run (Quinn Nordin kick)	MICH 21–0
2	0:15	MICH	Jake Moody 33-yard field goal	MICH 24–0
3	14:05	MICH	Christian Turner 7-yard run (Quinn Nordin kick)	MICH 31–0
3	2:35	MICH	Shea Patterson 2-yard run (Quinn Nordin kick)	MICH 38–0
4	12:40	MICH	Joe Milton 1-yard run (Quinn Nordin kick)	MICH 45–0
4	9:08	MICH	Giles Jackson 23-yard pass from Joe Milton (Jake Moody kick)	MICH 52–0

Following its game against Wisconsin, Michigan hosted the Rutgers Scarlet Knights. Last season, Michigan won in a blowout, 42–7.

Michigan defeated Rutgers in a blowout 52–0. Michigan scored 14 points in the first quarter on a 48-yard touchdown pass from Shea Patterson to Nico Collins, and a two-yard touchdown run from Patterson. Michigan added 10 points in the second quarter on a four-yard touchdown run from Patterson and a 33-yard field goal by Jake Moody, which made the score 24–0 in favor of Michigan at half-time. Michigan added 14 points in the third quarter on a seven-yard touchdown run from Christian Turner and a one-yard touchdown run from Patterson. Michigan added 14 more points in the fourth quarter on a one-yard touchdown run from Joe Milton and a 23-yard touchdown pass from Milton to Giles Jackson.

This was Michigan's first shutout victory since defeating Rutgers 78–0 in 2016. Patterson became the sixth quarterback in program history to rush for three touchdowns in a game, and the first to do so since Devin Gardner in 2013. Michigan's defense held Rutgers to 152 yards of total offense and just 2.9 yards per play. The last time Michigan held an opponent under 200 yards was Penn State (186) last season. Dan Jokisch, Alan Selzer and German Green all made their Michigan debuts during the game.

=== Iowa ===
Iowa at Michigan
(Homecoming game)

Team	1	2	3	4	Total
No. 14 Hawkeyes	0	3	0	0	3
• No. 19 Wolverines	10	0	0	0	10

- Date: October 5
- Location: Michigan Stadium
  Ann Arbor, MI
- Game start: 12:05 EDT
- Elapsed time: 3:26
- Game attendance: 111,519
- Game weather: High 50s, Mostly cloudy, SE 10–15 MPH
- Referee: Mike Cannon
- TV announcers (Fox): Gus Johnson (play-by-play), Joel Klatt (analyst), Jenny Taft (sideline)

Scoring summary
1	12:19	MICH	Jake Moody 28-yard field goal	MICH 3–0
1	8:33	MICH	Zach Charbonnet 2-yard run (Quinn Nordin kick)	MICH 10–0
2	9:08	IOWA	Keith Duncan 22-yard field goal	MICH 10–3

After facing Rutgers, Michigan hosted the Iowa Hawkeyes in its homecoming game. This was the first meeting between the two teams since 2016. In the previous meeting, Iowa upset Michigan, 13–14.

Michigan defeated Iowa 10–3. Michigan scored ten points in the first quarter on a 28-yard field goal by Jake Moody and a two-yard touchdown run from Zach Charbonnet. In the second quarter, Iowa responded with a 22-yard field goal by Keith Duncan, which made the score 10–3 in favor of Michigan at half-time. Both teams were held scoreless during the second half of the game.

Michigan's defense forced four turnovers, including three interceptions and one fumble and held Iowa to one rushing yard, the Hawkeyes averaged 217.5 rushing yards per game entering the game. The Wolverine's posted a season-high eight sacks, the first time they recorded at least five sacks in a game since 2017 against Purdue. This was Michigan's third game this season with multiple turnovers forced.

=== At Illinois ===
Michigan at Illinois
(Illinois–Michigan football series)

Team	1	2	3	4	Total
• No. 16 Wolverines	14	14	0	14	42
Fighting Illini	0	7	10	8	25

- Date: October 12
- Location: Memorial Stadium
  Champaign, IL
- Game start: 12:06 p.m. EDT
- Elapsed time: 3:38
- Game attendance: 37,275
- Game weather: 46º F, Sunny, SW 18 MPH
- Referee: Jerry McGinn
- TV announcers (ABC): Dave Pasch (play-by-play), Greg McElroy (analyst), Tom Luginbill (sideline)

Scoring summary
1	11:20	MICH	Hassan Haskins 29-yard run (Quinn Nordin kick)	MICH 7–0
1	0:59	MICH	Luke Schoonmaker 25-yard pass from Shea Patterson (Jake Moody kick)	MICH 14–0
2	12:19	MICH	Zach Charbonnet 7-yard run (Jake Moody kick)	MICH 21–0
2	4:33	MICH	Nick Eubanks 4-yard pass from Shea Patterson (Jake Moody kick)	MICH 28–0
2	0:55	ILL	Josh Imatorbhebhe 23-yard pass from Matt Robinson (James McCourt kick)	MICH 28–7
3	10:14	ILL	James McCourt 50-yard field goal	MICH 28–10
3	0:30	ILL	Matt Robinson 1-yard run (James McCourt kick)	MICH 28–17
4	12:50	ILL	Dre Brown 1-yard run (Dre Brown run for two-point conversion)	MICH 28–25
4	8:57	MICH	Donovan Peoples-Jones 5-yard pass from Shea Patterson (Quinn Nordin kick)	MICH 35–25
4	9:08	MICH	Shea Patterson 1-yard run (Quinn Nordin kick)	MICH 42–25

After its homecoming game against Iowa, Michigan traveled to Champaign, Illinois to face the Illinois Fighting Illini. This was the first meeting between the two teams since 2016. Michigan won the previous meeting, 41–8.

Michigan defeated Illinois 42–25. Michigan scored 14 points in the first quarter on a 29-yard touchdown run from Hassan Haskins and a 25-yard touchdown pass from Shea Patterson to Luke Schoonmaker. Michigan added 14 points in the second quarter on a seven-yard touchdown run from Zach Charbonnet and a four-yard touchdown pass from Patterson to Nick Eubanks. Illinois finally got on the board late in the first half on a 23-yard touchdown pass from Matt Robinson to Josh Imatorbhebhe, which made the score 28–7 in favor of Michigan at half-time. Illinois scored the only points of the third quarter on a 50-yard field goal by James McCourt and a one-yard touchdown run from Matt Robinson. Illinois opened the scoring in the fourth quarter on a one-yard touchdown run from Dre Brown, and a two-point conversion run from Brown, reducing Michigan's lead to three points. Michigan responded with 14 points on a five-yard touchdown pass from Patterson to Donovan Peoples-Jones and a one-yard touchdown run from Patterson.

Michigan recorded 162 rushing yards in the first quarter, the most by the Wolverines against a Big Ten opponent in the first quarter in 15 seasons. Michigan finished the game with a season-high 295 rushing yards. Freshman running back Zach Charbonnet had 108 rushing yards in the first half, becoming the first Wolverine to do so since Karan Higdon ran for 139 against Nebraska last season.

=== At Penn State ===
No. 16 Michigan at No. 7 Penn State

Team	1	2	3	4	Total
No. 16 Wolverines	0	7	7	7	21
• No. 7 Nittany Lions	7	14	0	7	28

- Date: October 19
- Location: Beaver Stadium
  State College, PA
- Game start: 7:44 p.m. EDT
- Elapsed time: 3:26
- Game attendance: 110,669
- Game weather: 54–50º F, Clear, cool, crisp, SSE 6 MPH
- Referee: Ron Snodgrass
- TV announcers (ABC): Chris Fowler (play-by-play), Kirk Herbstreit (analyst), Maria Taylor (sideline)

Scoring summary
1	5:59	PSU	Pat Freiermuth 17-yard pass from Sean Clifford (Jake Pinegar kick)	PSU 7–0
2	14:56	PSU	Sean Clifford 2-yard run (Jake Pinegar kick)	PSU 14–0
2	7:22	PSU	K. J. Hamler 25-yard pass from Sean Clifford (Jake Pinegar kick)	PSU 21–0
2	2:55	MICH	Zach Charbonnet 12-yard run (Jake Moody kick)	PSU 21–7
3	1:05	MICH	Zach Charbonnet 12-yard run (Jake Moody kick)	PSU 21–14
4	13:14	PSU	K. J. Hamler 53-yard pass from Sean Clifford (Jake Pinegar kick)	PSU 28–14
4	8:48	MICH	Shea Patterson 1-yard run (Jake Moody kick)	PSU 28–21

Following its game against Illinois, Michigan traveled to Happy Valley to face the Penn State Nittany Lions. Last season, Michigan won in a blowout, 42–7.

Michigan lost to Penn State 21–28 in Penn State's annual White Out game. Penn State opened the scoring in the first quarter on a 17-yard touchdown pass from Sean Clifford to Pat Freiermuth. Penn State added 14 points in the second quarter on a two-yard touchdown run from Clifford and a 25-yard touchdown pass from Clifford to K. J. Hamler. Michigan finally got on the board late in the first half on a 12-yard touchdown run from Zach Charbonnet. Michigan kicker Jake Moody missed a 52-yard field goal attempt in the final minute of the half, which made the score 21–7 in favor of Penn State at half-time. Michigan scored the only points of the third quarter on a 12-yard touchdown run from Charbonnet. The teams exchanged touchdowns in the fourth quarter on a 53-yard touchdown pass from Clifford to Hamler for Penn State and a one-yard touchdown run from Shea Patterson for Michigan with 8:48 remaining. Down by seven points, Michigan forced a Penn State three-and-out and regained possession with 6:46 to go. Michigan drove the length of the field and advanced to the Penn State three yard line. On fourth and goal, Patterson's pass to Ronnie Bell was dropped by Bell in the endzone. Penn State then wound down the final 2:01 to win the game.

=== Notre Dame ===
No. 8 Notre Dame at No. 19 Michigan
(Michigan–Notre Dame football rivalry)

Team	1	2	3	4	Total
No. 8 Fighting Irish	0	0	7	7	14
• No. 19 Wolverines	3	14	7	21	45

- Date: October 26
- Location: Michigan Stadium
  Ann Arbor, MI
- Game start: 7:44 p.m. EDT
- Elapsed time: 3:31
- Game attendance: 111,909
- Game weather: High 40s, Rain, SE 10–20 MPH
- Referee: John O'Neill
- TV announcers (ABC): Chris Fowler (play-by-play), Kirk Herbstreit (analyst), Maria Taylor (sideline)

Scoring summary
1	5:25	MICH	Jake Moody 21-yard field goal	MICH 3–0
2	13:51	MICH	Zach Charbonnet 7-yard run (Jake Moody kick)	MICH 10–0
2	9:52	MICH	Zach Charbonnet 1-yard run (Jake Moody kick)	MICH 17–0
3	5:27	ND	Cole Kmet 7-yard pass from Ian Book (Jonathan Doerer kick)	MICH 17–7
3	2:37	MICH	Donovan Peoples-Jones 8-yard pass from Shea Patterson (Jake Moody kick)	MICH 24–7
4	11:29	MICH	Nico Collins 16-yard pass from Shea Patterson (Jake Moody kick)	MICH 31–7
4	8:46	MICH	Tru Wilson 27-yard run (Jake Moody kick)	MICH 38–7
4	4:23	MICH	Mike Sainristil 26-yard pass from Dylan McCaffrey (Jake Moody kick)	MICH 45–7
4	3:45	ND	Javon McKinley 14-yard pass from Phil Jurkovec (Jonathan Doerer Kick)	MICH 45–14

After its game against Penn State, Michigan hosted the Notre Dame Fighting Irish to rekindle its long-running rivalry. Last season, Michigan lost to Notre Dame in a season-opening match-up, 24–17.

Michigan defeated Notre Dame 45–14 in a game played in driving rain. On Michigan's first offensive possession, it was held to a three-and-out, but on the ensuing punt, the ball was fumbled by the Notre Dame return man and recovered by Michigan's Daxton Hill. Michigan stalled at the goal line and settled for a 21-yard field goal by Jake Moody. Michigan's next possession carried over into the second quarter and ended with a seven-yard touchdown run from Zach Charbonnet. Michigan forced another Notre Dame punt, and scored another touchdown on its next drive, this one from one yard out by Charbonnet. The score was 17–0 in favor of Michigan at half-time. Notre Dame finally got on the board in the third quarter on a seven-yard touchdown pass from Ian Book to Cole Kmet. Michigan responded with an eight-yard touchdown pass from Shea Patterson to Donovan Peoples-Jones. Michigan added 21 points in the fourth quarter on a 16-yard touchdown pass from Patterson to Nico Collins, a 27-yard touchdown run from Tru Wilson and a 26-yard touchdown pass from Dylan McCaffrey to Mike Sainristil. Down 45–7, Notre Dame scored on a 14-yard touchdown pass from Phil Jurkovec to Javon McKinley with 3:45 remaining, and Michigan wound down the rest of the clock on its next possession.

Michigan's 31-point victory marked its third-largest margin of victory against Notre Dame in series history. Michigan's defense held Notre Dame to 47 yards rushing on 31 carries, and 180 yards of total offense.

=== At Maryland ===
No. 14 Michigan at Maryland

Team	1	2	3	4	Total
• No. 14 Wolverines	14	7	14	3	38
Terrapins	0	0	7	0	7

- Date: November 2
- Location: Maryland Stadium
  College Park, MD
- Game start: 12:06 EDT
- Elapsed time: 3:04
- Game attendance: 40,701
- Referee: Mark Kluczynski
- TV announcers (ABC): Steve Levy, Brian Griese, Todd McShay, Molly McGrath

Scoring summary
1	14:14	MICH	Giles Jackson 97-yard kickoff return (Jake Moody kick)	MICH 7–0
1	8:42	MICH	Zach Charbonnet 2-yard run (Jake Moody kick)	MICH 14–0
2	1:28	MICH	Zach Charbonnet 8-yard run (Jake Moody kick)	MICH 21–0
3	5:10	MICH	Nick Eubanks 5-yard pass from Shea Patterson (Quinn Nordin kick)	MICH 28–0
3	1:31	MICH	Hassan Haskins 14-yard run (Quinn Nordin kick)	MICH 35–0
3	1:18	MD	Javon Leake 97-yard kickoff return (Joseph Petrino kick)	MICH 35–7
4	9:04	MICH	Quinn Nordin 38-yard field goal	MICH 38–7

After facing Notre Dame, Michigan traveled to College Park to face the Maryland Terrapins. Last season, following a 70-minute weather delay due to thunderstorms in the area, Michigan defeated Maryland 42–21.

Michigan defeated Maryland 38–7. Michigan scored 14 points in the first quarter on a game-opening 97-yard kickoff return by Giles Jackson and a two-yard touchdown run from Zach Charbonnet on Michigan's first offensive possession. Michigan extended its lead in the second quarter on an eight-yard touchdown run from Charbonnet. Michigan's Jake Moody missed a 37-yard field goal attempt in the final seconds of the half, and the score was 21–0 Michigan at half-time. Michigan added 14 points in the third quarter on a five-yard touchdown pass from Shea Patterson to Nick Eubanks, and a 14-yard touchdown run from Hassan Haskins. Maryland finally got on the board late in the third quarter on a 97-yard kickoff return by Javon Leake. In the fourth quarter Michigan scored on a 38-yard field goal by Quinn Nordin.

With two touchdowns in the game, running back Zach Charbonnet set a Michigan program record for the most touchdowns by a freshman with 11.

=== Michigan State ===
Michigan State at No. 15 Michigan
(Paul Bunyan Trophy)

Team	1	2	3	4	Total
Spartans	7	0	3	0	10
• No. 15 Wolverines	0	17	10	17	44

- Date: November 16
- Location: Michigan Stadium
  Ann Arbor, MI
- Game start: 12:05 p.m. EST
- Elapsed time: 3:34
- Game attendance: 111,496
- Game weather: Low 30s, Partly cloudy, E 5–10 MPH
- Referee: Daniel Capron
- TV announcers (Fox): Gus Johnson, Joel Klatt, Jenny Taft

Scoring summary
1	1:48	MSU	Max Rosenthal 1-yard pass from Brian Lewerke (Matt Coghlin kick)	MSU 7–0
2	14:29	MICH	Hassan Haskins 1-yard run (Quinn Nordin kick)	Tied 7–7
2	4:18	MICH	Nick Eubanks 5-yard pass from Shea Patterson (Quinn Nordin kick)	MICH 14–7
2	0:15	MICH	Quinn Nordin 28-yard field goal	MICH 17–7
3	12:40	MICH	Donovan Peoples-Jones 18-yard pass from Shea Patterson (Quinn Nordin kick)	MICH 24–7
3	6:43	MSU	Matt Coghlin 35-yard field goal	MICH 24–10
3	2:13	MICH	Quinn Nordin 49-yard field goal	MICH 27–10
4	14:46	MICH	Nico Collins 22-yard pass from Shea Patterson (Quinn Nordin kick)	MICH 34–10
4	10:12	MICH	Quinn Nordin 33-yard field goal	MICH 37–10
4	2:33	MICH	Cornelius Johnson 39-yard pass from Shea Patterson (Quinn Nordin kick)	MICH 44–10

After its game against Maryland and having a second bye week, Michigan hosted its in-state rival, the Michigan State Spartans in the battle for the Paul Bunyan Trophy. Last season, Michigan defeated Michigan State 21–7.

Michigan defeated Michigan State 44–10. Michigan State opened the scoring in the first quarter with a one-yard touchdown pass from Brian Lewerke to Max Rosenthal. Michigan punted on its first two possessions, but scored on each of its next eight. Michigan's first points came on the second play of the second quarter on a one-yard touchdown run from Hassan Haskins. Its next drive began on its two-yard line, and ended 12 plays and 98 yards later with a five-yard touchdown pass from Shea Patterson to Nick Eubanks. Michigan kicker Quinn Nordin converted a 28-yard field goal with 15 seconds left in the half, which made the score 17–7 in favor of Michigan at half-time. Michigan added 10 points in the third quarter on an 18-yard touchdown pass from Patterson to Donovan Peoples-Jones and a 49-yard field goal by Nordin. Michigan State scored on a 35-yard field goal by Matt Coghlin. Michigan added 17 points in the fourth quarter on a 22-yard touchdown pass from Patterson to Nico Collins, a 33-yard field goal by Nordin and a 39-yard touchdown pass from Patterson to Cornelius Johnson.

Michigan's defense held Michigan State to 54 rushing yards and only 17 receptions, the Spartans' second lowest reception total of the season. Patterson's 384 yards and four touchdown passes represented career highs for him since transferring to Michigan. Tom Fornelli of CBS Sports called the game "a thoroughly dominating performance by the Wolverines", noting that Michigan's 44 points "are the most it has scored in a game against Michigan State since a 45–37 victory in 2004". According to MLive, the game was the most lopsided loss Mark Dantonio experienced in his 13 rivalry games, and it was also the largest margin of defeat for Michigan State against Michigan since a 49–3 loss in 2002.

=== At Indiana ===
Michigan at Indiana

Team	1	2	3	4	Total
• No. 13 Wolverines	7	14	18	0	39
Hoosiers	7	7	0	0	14

- Date: November 23
- Location: Memorial Stadium
  Bloomington, IN
- Game start: 3:35 EST
- Elapsed time: 3:12
- Game attendance: 43,671
- Game weather: 36º F, Intermittent rain, NNW 8 MPH
- Referee: Mark Kluczynski
- TV announcers (ESPN): Sean McDonough, Todd Blackledge, Holly Rowe

Scoring summary
1	10:07	IND	Stevie Scott III 1-yard run (Logan Justus kick)	IND 7–0
1	5:45	MICH	Ronnie Bell 6-yard pass from Shea Patterson (Quinn Nordin kick)	Tied 7–7
2	14:09	IND	Peyton Ramsey 1-yard run (Logan Justus Kick)	IND 14–7
2	11:01	MICH	Donovan Peoples-Jones 11-yard pass from Shea Patterson (Quinn Nordin kick)	Tied 14–14
2	5:37	MICH	Nico Collins 24-yard pass from Shea Patterson (Quinn Nordin kick)	MICH 21–14
3	10:04	MICH	Quinn Nordin 27-yard field goal	MICH 24–14
3	5:10	MICH	Nico Collins 76-yard pass from Shea Patterson (Dylan McCaffrey run)	MICH 32–14
3	1:39	MICH	Nico Collins 19-yard pass from Shea Patterson (Quinn Nordin kick)	MICH 39–14

Following its game against in-state rival Michigan State, Michigan traveled to play its final road game against the Indiana Hoosiers. Last season, Michigan defeated Indiana 31–20.

Michigan defeated Indiana 39–14. The teams exchanged touchdowns in the first quarter on a one-yard touchdown run from Stevie Scott III for Indiana, and a six-yard touchdown pass from Shea Patterson to Ronnie Bell for Michigan. Indiana regained the lead in the second quarter on a one-yard touchdown run from Peyton Ramsey. Michigan responded with 32 unanswered points. Michigan scored 14 points in the second quarter on an 11-yard touchdown pass from Patterson to Donovan Peoples-Jones and a 24-yard touchdown pass from Patterson to Nico Collins, which made the score 21–14 in favor of Michigan at half-time. Michigan scored 18 points in the third quarter on a 27-yard field goal by Quinn Nordin, and two touchdown passes from Patterson to Collins, from 76-yards, and 19-yards, respectively. Both teams were held scoreless in the fourth quarter.

Quarterback Shea Patterson finished the game 20-of-32 passing for 366 yards with five touchdowns, becoming the first Michigan quarterback with consecutive 300-yard games since Jake Rudock in 2015. He also became the first quarterback in program history to record four touchdown passes in consecutive games. Patterson's five touchdown passes were the second most by any quarterback in program history and the most during a regulation game.

=== Ohio State ===
Ohio State at Michigan
(The Game)

Team	1	2	3	4	Total
• No. 1 Buckeyes	14	14	14	14	56
No. 13 Wolverines	13	3	3	8	27

- Date: November 30
- Location: Michigan Stadium
  Ann Arbor, MI
- Game start: 12:05 EST
- Elapsed time: 3:41
- Game attendance: 112,071
- Game weather: Mid 30s, Cloudy possible rain, E 10–15 MPH
- Referee: Jeff Servinski
- TV announcers (Fox): Gus Johnson (play-by-play), Joel Klatt (analyst), Jenny Taft (sideline)

Scoring summary
1	11:43	MICH	Giles Jackson 22-yard run (Quinn Nordin kick failed)	MICH 6–0
1	8:50	OSU	J. K. Dobbins 5-yard run (Blake Haubeil kick)	OSU 7–6
1	1:27	OSU	Chris Olave 57-yard pass from Justin Fields (Blake Haubeil kick)	OSU 14–6
1	0:19	MICH	Donovan Peoples-Jones 25-yard pass from Shea Patterson (Quinn Nordin kick)	OSU 14–13
2	10:12	OSU	J. K. Dobbins 6-yard run (Blake Haubeil kick)	OSU 21–13
2	3:15	OSU	J. K. Dobbins 5-yard run (Blake Haubeil kick)	OSU 28–13
2	0:19	MICH	Quinn Nordin 23-yard field goal	OSU 28–16
3	11:18	OSU	K. J. Hill 6-yard pass from Justin Fields (Blake Haubeil kick)	OSU 35–16
3	3:46	OSU	Garrett Wilson 30-yard pass from Justin Fields (Blake Haubeil kick)	OSU 42–16
3	2:33	MICH	Quinn Nordin 45-yard field goal	OSU 42–19
4	14:23	MICH	Hassan Haskins 2-yard run (Hassan Haskins run)	OSU 42–27
4	10:11	OSU	Austin Mack 16-yard pass from Justin Fields (Blake Haubeil kick)	OSU 49–27
4	6:30	OSU	J. K. Dobbins 33-yard run (Blake Haubeil kick)	OSU 56–27

Following its road finale against Indiana, Michigan hosted Ohio State, in the 116th playing of "The Game". Last season, Michigan was upset by Ohio State 62–39.

Michigan lost to Ohio State 56–27. Michigan opened the scoring in the first quarter on a 22-yard touchdown run from Giles Jackson, after which Quinn Nordin's extra point missed. Ohio State scored 14 points on a five-yard touchdown run from J. K. Dobbins and a 57-yard touchdown pass from Justin Fields to Chris Olave. Michigan responded with a 25-yard touchdown pass from Shea Patterson to Donovan Peoples-Jones, reducing the Buckeyes' lead to one. Ohio State added 14 points in the second quarter on two touchdown runs from Dobbins, from six-yards, and five-yards, respectively. Michigan scored on a 23-yard field goal by Nordin, which made the score 28–16 in favor of Ohio State at half-time. Ohio State added 14 more points in the third quarter on two touchdown passes from Fields, a six-yard touchdown pass to K. J. Hill and a 30-yard touchdown pass to Garrett Wilson. Michigan scored on a 45-yard field goal by Nordin. In the fourth quarter, Michigan scored on a two-yard touchdown run from Hassan Haskins, followed by a two-point conversion run from Haskins. Ohio State again added 14 points on a 16-yard touchdown pass from Fields to Austin Mack, and a 33-yard touchdown run from Dobbins.

Ohio State extended its winning streak in the series to eight games, which became the longest streak by either team in series history. The Buckeyes also became the first team in the series to score 50 or more points in consecutive games. Michigan quarterback Shea Patterson completed 14 of 18 passes in the first half, but was 4 of 24 in the second half, which was the lowest completion percentage for an FBS quarterback in one half (attempting at least 20 passes) in at least 15 years. He threw for 305 yards and one touchdown, becoming the first quarterback in program history to throw for 300 or more yards in three consecutive games. With Giles Jackson's rushing touchdown in the first quarter, he became the second true freshmen in program history to score touchdowns via kick return, receiving and rushing in his first season, following Gil Chapman in 1972.

=== Vs. Alabama (Citrus Bowl) ===
Michigan vs. Alabama
(Citrus Bowl)

Team	1	2	3	4	Total
No. 14 Wolverines	10	6	0	0	16
• No. 13 Crimson Tide	7	7	7	14	35

- Date: January 1, 2020
- Location: Camping World Stadium
  Orlando, FL
- Game start: 1:07 EST
- Elapsed time: 3:26
- Game attendance: 59,746
- Game weather: 66º F, Mostly sunny, clear, NNW 5 MPH
- Referee: Mike Mothershed
- TV announcers (ABC): Dave Pasch (play-by-play), Greg McElroy (analyst) and Tom Luginbill (sideline)

Scoring summary
1	13:47	BAMA	Jerry Jeudy 85-yard pass from Mac Jones (Joseph Bulovas kick)	BAMA 7–0
1	0:19	MICH	Nick Eubanks 7-yard pass from Shea Patterson (Quinn Nordin kick)	Tied 7–7
1	0:09	MICH	Quinn Nordin 36-yard field goal	MICH 10–7
2	7:16	MICH	Quinn Nordin 42-yard field goal	MICH 13–7
2	3:32	BAMA	Najee Harris 9-yard run (Joseph Bulovas kick)	BAMA 14–13
2	0:00	MICH	Quinn Nordin 57-yard field goal	MICH 16–14
3	13:30	BAMA	DeVonta Smith 42-yard pass from Mac Jones (Joseph Bulovas kick)	BAMA 21–16
4	10:01	BAMA	Miller Forristall 20-yard pass from Mac Jones (Joseph Bulovas kick)	BAMA 28–16
4	0:26	BAMA	Najee Harris 2-yard run (Joseph Bulovas kick)	BAMA 35–16

On December 8, Michigan was selected to play in the Citrus Bowl against the Alabama Crimson Tide. Michigan lost the most recent meeting between the teams 41–14 in the 2012 Cowboys Classic. This was Michigan's 48th bowl game appearance, and its sixth appearance in the Citrus Bowl.

Michigan lost to Alabama 35–16. Alabama opened the scoring in the first quarter on an 85-yard touchdown pass from Mac Jones to Jerry Jeudy. Michigan responded with ten points on a seven-yard touchdown pass from Shea Patterson to Nick Eubanks, and a 36-yard field goal by Quinn Nordin to take its first lead of the game. Michigan extended its lead in the second quarter on a 42-yard field goal by Nordin. Alabama responded with a nine-yard touchdown run from Najee Harris to regain the lead. Quinn Nordin then kicked a Citrus Bowl record 57-yard field goal as time expired in the first half, which made the score 16–14 in favor of Michigan at half-time. Michigan was held scoreless in the second half, as Alabama scored 21 unanswered points. Alabama scored the only points in the third quarter on a 42-yard touchdown pass from Jones to DeVonta Smith to regain the lead. Alabama scored 14 points in the fourth quarter on a 20-yard touchdown pass from Jones to Miller Forristall and a two-yard touchdown run from Harris.

Quarterback Shea Patterson finished the season with 3,061 passing yards, becoming the third quarterback in program history to pass for over 3,000 yards in a season, following John Navarre (3,331 yards in 2003) and Jake Rudock (3,017 yards in 2015). Quinn Nordin converted a 57-yard field goal at the end of the first half, the longest field goal in Citrus Bowl history, and tying the record for the longest field goal made in Michigan program history.

== Roster ==
2019 Michigan Wolverines football team roster
Players
Coaches
Offense

Pos.	#	Name	Class
OL	50	Michael Onwenu	Sr
OL	51	Cesar Ruiz	Jr
OL	52	Karsen Barnhart	Fr
OL	53	Trente Jones	Fr
OL	54	Kraig Correll	So
OL	55	Nolan Rumler	Fr
OL	58	Zach Carpenter	Fr
OL	59	Joel Honigford	Jr
OL	60	Luke Fisher	Fr
OL	61	Dan Jokisch	Jr
OL	62	Mica Gelb	Fr
OL	64	Mahdi Hazime	Fr
OL	66	Chuck Filiaga	Jr
OL	68	Andrew Vastardis	Jr
OL	70	Jack Stewart	Fr
OL	71	Andrew Stueber	Jr
OL	72	Stephen Spanellis	Jr
OL	73	Jalen Mayfield	So
OL	74	Ben Bredeson (C)	Sr
OL	75	Jon Runyan Jr.	RSr
OL	76	Ryan Hayes	So
OL	77	Trevor Keegan	Fr
OL	78	Griffin Korican	So
OL	79	Greg Robinson	Sr
QB	2	Shea Patterson	Sr
QB	3	Joe Milton	So
QB	6	Michael Sessa	Sr
QB	9	Andy Maddox	Fr
QB	10	Dylan McCaffrey	Jr
QB	12	Cade McNamara	Fr
QB	16	Ren Hefley	Fr
RB	3	Christian Turner	So
RB	13	Tru Wilson	Sr
RB	20	Nicholas Capatina	Jr
RB	23	Jordan Castleberry	Fr
RB	24	Zach Charbonnet	Fr
RB	25	Hassan Haskins	So
RB	28	Danny Hughes	Fr
RB	33	Leon Franklin	Fr
RB	40	Ben VanSumeren	So
RB	41	Abe Jaafar	Fr
RB	44	Jared Char	Sr
RB	45	Peter Bush	Sr
RB	46	Matt Brown	Jr
RB	49	Lucas Andrighetto	So
TE	35	Luke Buckman	So
TE	36	Ramsey Baty	So
TE	38	Joseph Files	RSr
TE	81	Will Sessa	Fr
TE	82	Nick Eubanks	Sr
TE	83	Erick All	Fr
TE	84	Sean McKeon	Sr
TE	85	Mustapha Muhammad	So
TE	86	Luke Schoonmaker	So
TE	89	Carter Selzer	Jr
WR	4	Nico Collins	Jr
WR	6	Cornelius Johnson	Fr
WR	7	Tarik Black	Jr
WR	8	Ronnie Bell	So
WR	9	Donovan Peoples-Jones	Jr
WR	15	Giles Jackson	Fr
WR	15	Jacob West	RSr
WR	18	Brendan White	RSr
WR	19	Mike Sainristil	Fr
WR	22	George Johnson	Fr
WR	24	Jake Martin	Sr
WR	31	Jack Young	Jr
WR	39	Matt Torey	So
WR	42	Matthew Harrison	Fr
WR	43	Tyler Grosz	Sr
WR	43	Jake McCurry	Jr
WR	81	Nate Schoenle	Sr
WR	82	Desmond Nicholas	Sr
WR	89	Hunter Neff	Fr

Defense

Pos.	#	Name	Class
DB	1	Ambry Thomas	Jr
DB	3	Jalen Perry	Fr
DB	5	D. J. Turner	Fr
DB	9	Gemon Green	So
DB	13	German Green	So
DB	14	Josh Metellus	Sr
DB	16	Jaylen Kelly-Powell	Jr
DB	17	Sammy Faustin	So
DB	20	Brad Hawkins	Jr
DB	23	Jared Davis	Jr
DB	23	Quinten Johnson	Fr
DB	24	Lavert Hill	Sr
DB	26	J'Marick Woods	Jr
DB	27	Hunter Reynolds	Jr
DB	30	Tyler Cochran	Sr
DB	30	Daxton Hill	Fr
DB	31	Vincent Gray	So
DB	33	Louis Grodman	RSr
DB	40	Caden Kolesar	Fr
DB	41	John Baty	Fr
DB	41	Quinn Rothman	So
DB	43	Andrew Russell	Fr
DB	49	Keshaun Harris	Fr
DL	2	Carlo Kemp	Sr
DL	4	Mike Danna	RSr
DL	15	Christopher Hinton	Fr
DL	18	Luiji Vilain	Jr
DL	19	Kwity Paye	Jr
DL	37	Dane Drobocky	Jr
DL	50	Michael Dwumfour	Sr
DL	54	Carl Myers	Sr
DL	57	Joey George	So
DL	58	Phillip Paea	Jr
DL	58	Mazi Smith	Fr
DL	67	Jess Speight	Jr
DL	71	David Ojabo	Fr
DL	80	Mike Morris	Fr
DL	91	Taylor Upshaw	So
DL	95	Donovan Jeter	Jr
DL	96	Julius Welschof	So
DL	97	Aidan Hutchinson	So
DL	99	Gabe Newburg	Fr
LB	6	Josh Uche	Sr
LB	7	Khaleke Hudson	Sr
LB	8	Devin Gil	Sr
LB	9	Joey Velazquez	Fr
LB	10	Anthony Solomon	Fr
LB	12	Josh Ross	Jr
LB	13	Charles Thomas	Fr
LB	23	Michael Barrett	So
LB	29	Jordan Glasgow	RSr
LB	32	Nolan Knight	Fr
LB	34	Jordan Anthony	Jr
LB	37	Jonathan Lampani	Sr
LB	38	Geoffrey Reeves	Sr
LB	39	Lawrence Reeves	Fr
LB	40	Ryan Nelson	Jr
LB	41	Adam Fakih	Jr
LB	44	Cameron McGrone	So
LB	45	Adam Shibley	Jr

Special teams

Pos.	#	Name	Class
K	2	Jake Moody	So
K	3	Quinn Nordin	Sr
K	39	Alan Selzer	Sr
K, P	92	Karl Kerska	Fr
LS	33	Camaron Cheeseman	Sr
LS	44	Matt Baldeck	Jr
LS	49	William Wagner	Fr
LS	99	Trey Harper	RSr
P	3	Brad Robbins	Jr
P	17	Will Hart	Sr
P	18	George Caratan	So
P	36	Izaak Gerkis	Fr

Head coach

- Jim Harbaugh

Coordinators/assistant coaches

- Don Brown (defensive coordinator / linebackers)
- Josh Gattis (offensive coordinator)
- Anthony Campanile (defensive assistant)
- Jay Harbaugh (running backs / assistant special teams coordinator)
- Ben McDaniels (quarterbacks)
- Sherrone Moore (tight ends)
- Shaun Nua (defensive line)
- Chris Partridge (special teams coordinator / safeties)
- Ed Warinner (offensive line)
- Mike Zordich (cornerbacks)

Legend

- (C) Team captain
- (S) Suspended
- (I) Ineligible
- Injured
- Redshirt

Roster
Last update: August 6, 2019

== Awards and honors ==
Weekly awards
Player	Award	Date awarded	Ref.
Zach Charbonnet	Big Ten Freshman of the Week	September 9, 2019	
Aidan Hutchinson	Big Ten Defensive Player of the Week	October 7, 2019	
Giles Jackson	Big Ten Co-Special Teams Player of the Week	November 4, 2019	
Shea Patterson	Big Ten Co-offensive Player of the Week	November 18, 2019	
Shea Patterson	Big Ten Co-offensive Player of the Week	November 25, 2019	

All-American
Player	AP	AFCA	FWAA	TSN	WCFF	Designation
Ben Bredeson	3				2	
The NCAA recognizes a selection to all five of the AP, AFCA, FWAA, TSN and WCFF first teams for unanimous selections and three of five for consensus selections.

All-Big Ten
Player	Position	Coaches	Media
Ben Bredeson	OL	1	1
Lavert Hill	DB	1	1
Jon Runyan Jr.	OL	1	1
Khaleke Hudson	LB	2	3
Kwity Paye	DL	2	3
Cesar Ruiz	C	2	3
Josh Uche	DL	2	3
Shea Patterson	QB	3	3
Will Hart	P	3	2
Ambry Thomas	DB	3	Hon.
Michael Onwenu	OG	3	Hon.
Carlo Kemp	DL	3	–
Zach Charbonnet	RB	Hon.	3
Aidan Hutchinson	DL	Hon.	3
Josh Metellus	DB	Hon.	3
Donovan Peoples-Jones	PR	Hon.	3
Nico Collins	WR	Hon.	Hon.
Nick Eubanks	TE	Hon.	Hon.
Hassan Haskins	RB	Hon.	Hon.
Giles Jackson	KR	Hon.	Hon.
Cameron McGrone	LB	Hon.	Hon.
Sean McKeon	TE	Hon.	Hon.
Jalen Mayfield	OL	Hon.	–
Jordan Glasgow	LB	–	Hon.
Brad Hawkins	DB	–	Hon.
Donovan Peoples-Jones	WR	–	Hon.
Hon. = Honorable mention. Reference:

== 2020 NFL draft ==
The 2020 NFL draft was held remotely (due to the COVID-19 pandemic) from April 23–25. Michigan tied a program record, and had the second most selections in the draft, with 10 players chosen. Three additional Michigan players were signed to NFL teams as undrafted free agents.

Round	Pick	Player	Position	NFL team
1	24	Cesar Ruiz	C	New Orleans Saints
2	60	Josh Uche	LB	New England Patriots
4	143	Ben Bredeson	OG	Baltimore Ravens
5	162	Khaleke Hudson	OLB	Washington Redskins
5	177	Mike Danna	DE	Kansas City Chiefs
6	182	Michael Onwenu	OG	New England Patriots
6	187	Donovan Peoples-Jones	WR	Cleveland Browns
6	192	Jon Runyan Jr.	OG	Green Bay Packers
6	205	Josh Metellus	S	Minnesota Vikings
6	213	Jordan Glasgow	OLB	Indianapolis Colts
Undrafted free agent		Lavert Hill	CB	Kansas City Chiefs
Undrafted free agent		Sean McKeon	TE	Dallas Cowboys
Undrafted free agent		Shea Patterson	QB	Kansas City Chiefs
