= Luke Schoonmaker =

American football player (born 1998)

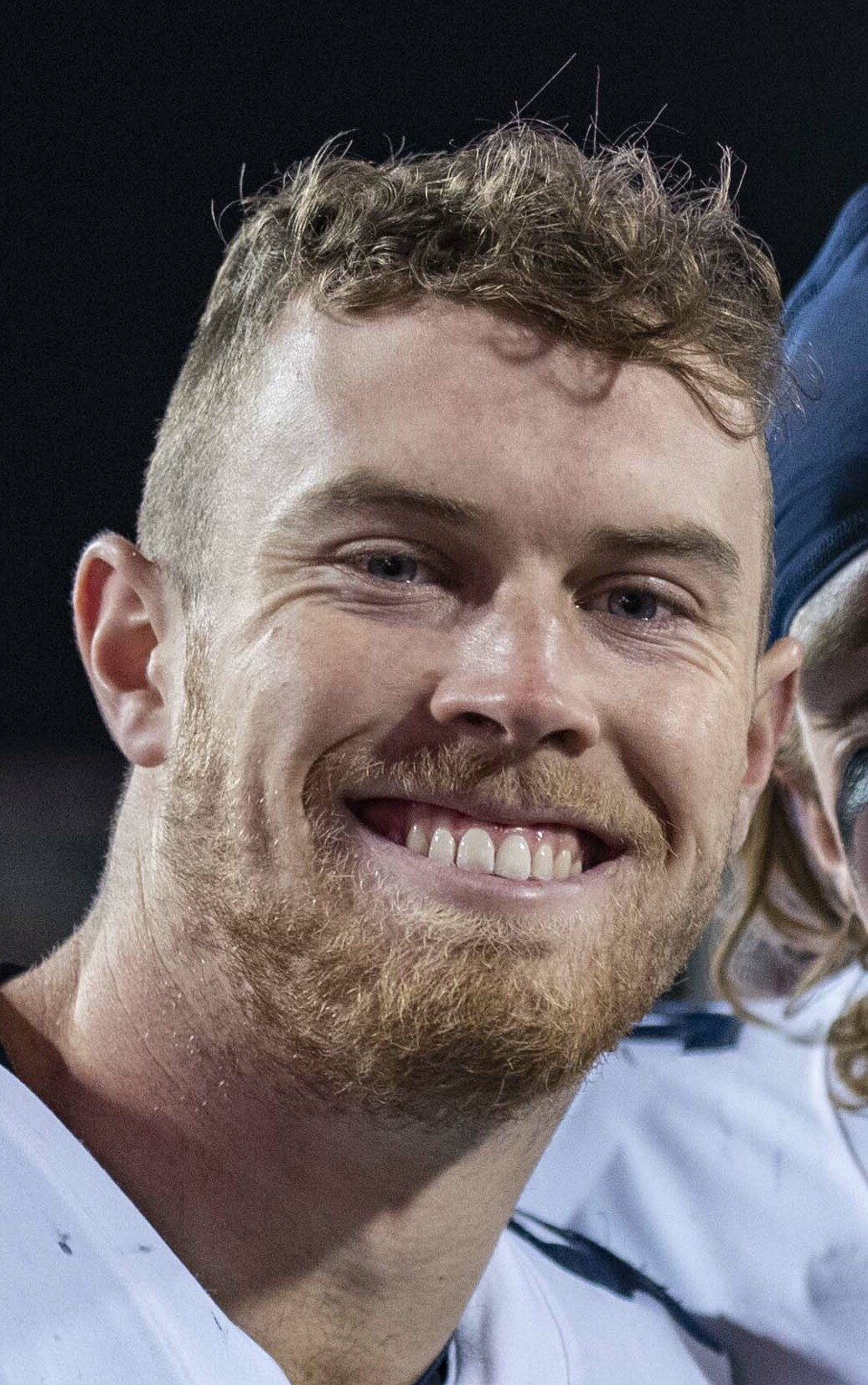
- Schoonmaker in 2021

No. 86 – Dallas Cowboys
- Position: Tight end
- Roster status: Active

Personal information
- Born: September 28, 1998 (age 28); New Haven, Connecticut, U.S.
- Listed height: 6 ft 5 in (1.96 m)
- Listed weight: 250 lb (113 kg)

Career information
- High school: Hamden Hall (Hamden, Connecticut)
- College: Michigan (2018–2022)
- NFL draft: 2023: 2nd round, 58th overall pick

Career history
- Dallas Cowboys (2023–present)

Awards and highlights
- Third-team All-Big Ten (2022)

Career NFL statistics as of Week 7, 2026
- Receptions: 52
- Receiving yards: 468
- Receiving touchdowns: 3
- Stats at Pro Football Reference

Luke Schoonmaker (/ˈskuːnˌmeɪkər/ SKOON-may-kər; born September 28, 1998) is an American professional football tight end for the Dallas Cowboys of the National Football League (NFL). He played college football for the Michigan Wolverines and was selected by the Cowboys in the second round of the 2023 NFL draft.

== Early life ==
Born in 1998, Schoonmaker grew up in Old Saybrook, Connecticut. He attended Xavier High School, where he was a teammate of future NFL quarterback Will Levis. He transferred to Hamden Hall Country Day School after his sophomore season.

As a junior, he missed time after being diagnosed with mononucleosis and suffering a ruptured spleen, which forced him to repeat the year. The next season he was the starter at quarterback, leading the team to an 11-0 record and winning the NEPSAC Mike Atkins Bowl. He also played some offensive snaps at the tight end position.

As a fifth year senior, he completed 18 passes, caught 22 passes, and carried as a rusher 34 times, while tallying 851 yards in combined passing, receiving and rushing yards. Rated as the top player in Connecticut, he committed to play college football at the University of Michigan.

== College career ==
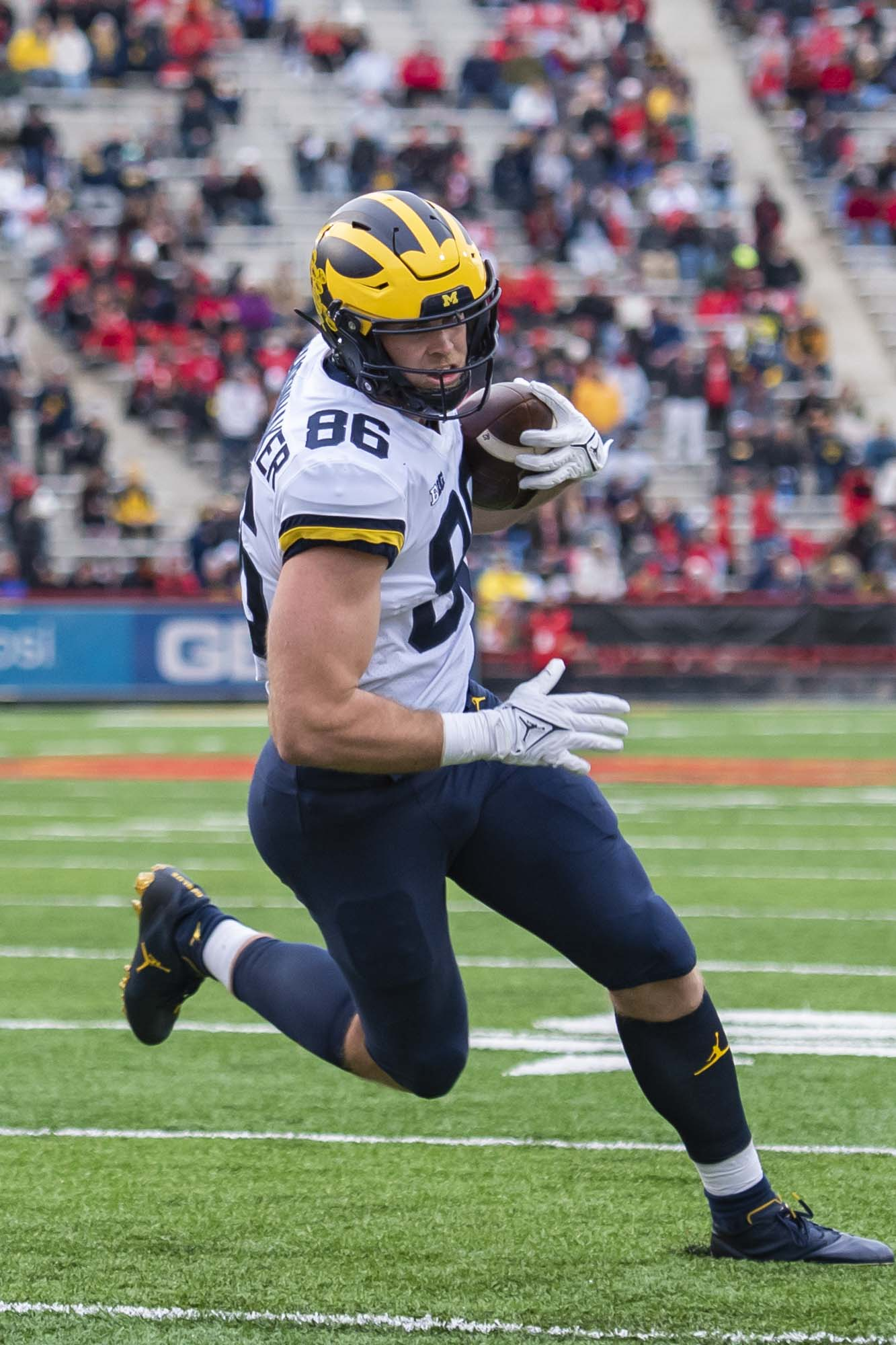
Schoonmaker in 2021

Schoonmaker played for the Michigan Wolverines from 2018 until 2022. As a freshman in 2018, he appeared in one game as a backup tight end, earning his first varsity letter.

As a sophomore in 2019, he appeared in 10 whole games and played as the fourth tight end in 9 contests, behind Sean McKeon, Nick Eubanks, and Erick All. He only played on special teams in the tenth game against Michigan State. He finished with 2 catches for 54 yards and one touchdown. On October 12, 2019, he scored his first collegiate touchdown on a 25-yard pass from Shea Patterson.

As a junior in 2020, the schedule was limited to only 6 games because of the COVID-19 pandemic. He appeared in all six games as the third-string tight end behind Eubanks and All, but did not register any offensive stats.

As a senior in 2021, although he was the backup tight end behind All, he was able to start 10 games, when the team opened in a two-tight end formation. He was used mainly for his blocking and was part of a unit that won the Joe Moore Award as the nation's top offensive line. He appeared in nine games and caught 17 passes for 165 yards and three touchdowns. He earned a reputation as Michigan's "most reliable blocking tight end and a player who never complained about his touches." After the 2021 season, Schoonmaker received honorable-mention All-Big Ten honors.

In January 2022, with eligibility remaining, Schooonmaker announced that he would return to Michigan as a fifth-year senior. In July, he was named to the watch list for the Mackey Award. He was also rated by NFL scouts as Michigan's most draftable player among the team's senior players.

In 2022, the starter at tight end All, appeared in the first three games (3 catches for 36 yards), before requiring back surgery, which opened the door for Schoonmaker to start for the rest of the season. On September 24, Schoonmaker caught a career-high seven passes for 72 yards and a touchdown against Maryland. Against Indiana on October 8, he established another career-high with nine receptions, adding 67 receiving yards and a touchdown. He suffered an AC joint sprain to his left shoulder in the ninth game against Rutgers, which forced him to miss the next two contests. He was forced to leave the College Football Playoff semifinal game against TCU in the second quarter, after suffering a right shoulder injury. He finished the season with 12 appearances (11 starts), 35 receptions (second on the team), 418 receiving yards (third on the team) and 3 touchdowns. He also contributed to the offensive line winning the Joe Moore Award for the second straight year.

In December 2022, he accepted an invite to the East–West Shrine Bowl. On January 9, 2023, Schoonmaker announced he would forego his final year of collegiate eligibility and declared for the 2023 NFL draft.

== Professional career ==
Pre-draft measurables
Height	Weight	Arm length	Hand span	Wingspan	40-yard dash	10-yard split	20-yard split	20-yard shuttle	Three-cone drill	Vertical jump	Broad jump
6 ft 5 1/4 in (1.96 m)	251 lb (114 kg)	32 7/8 in (0.84 m)	9 in (0.23 m)	6 ft 6 1/8 in (1.98 m)	4.63 s	1.59 s	2.70 s	4.27 s	6.81 s	35.5 in (0.90 m)	10 ft 7 in (3.23 m)
All values from NFL Combine/Pro Day

Schoonmaker was selected by the Dallas Cowboys in the second round, 58th overall, of the 2023 NFL draft. In Week 2 against the Jets, he scored his first NFL touchdown on a one-yard reception. As a rookie, he appeared in all 17 games. He finished with eight receptions for 65 yards and two touchdowns in the 2023 season.

== Career statistics ==
=== NFL ===
Legend
**Bold**	Career high

==== Regular season ====
Year	Team	Games		Receiving					Fumbles	
Year	Team	GP	GS	Rec	Yds	Avg	Lng	TD	Fum	Lost
2023	DAL	**17**	0	8	65	8.1	18	**2**	0	0
2024	DAL	**17**	6	**27**	**241**	8.9	24	1	0	0
2025	DAL	**17**	**7**	14	132	**9.4**	**29**	0	0	0
2026	DAL	7	1	3	30	10.0	12	0	0	0
Career		58	14	52	468	9.0	29	3	0	0

==== Postseason ====
Year	Team	Games		Receiving					Fumbles	
Year	Team	GP	GS	Rec	Yds	Avg	Lng	TD	Fum	Lost
2023	DAL	1	0	1	7	7.0	7	0	0	0
Career		1	0	1	7	7.0	7	0	0	0

=== College ===
Year	Team	GP	Receiving			
Year	Team	GP	Rec	Yds	Avg	TD
2018	Michigan	1	0	0	0.0	0
2019	Michigan	10	2	54	**27.0**	1
2020	Michigan	6	0	0	0.0	0
2021	Michigan	**14**	17	165	9.7	**3**
2022	Michigan	12	**35**	**418**	11.9	**3**
Career		43	54	637	11.8	7
