= Ronnie Bell (American football) =

American football player (born 2000)

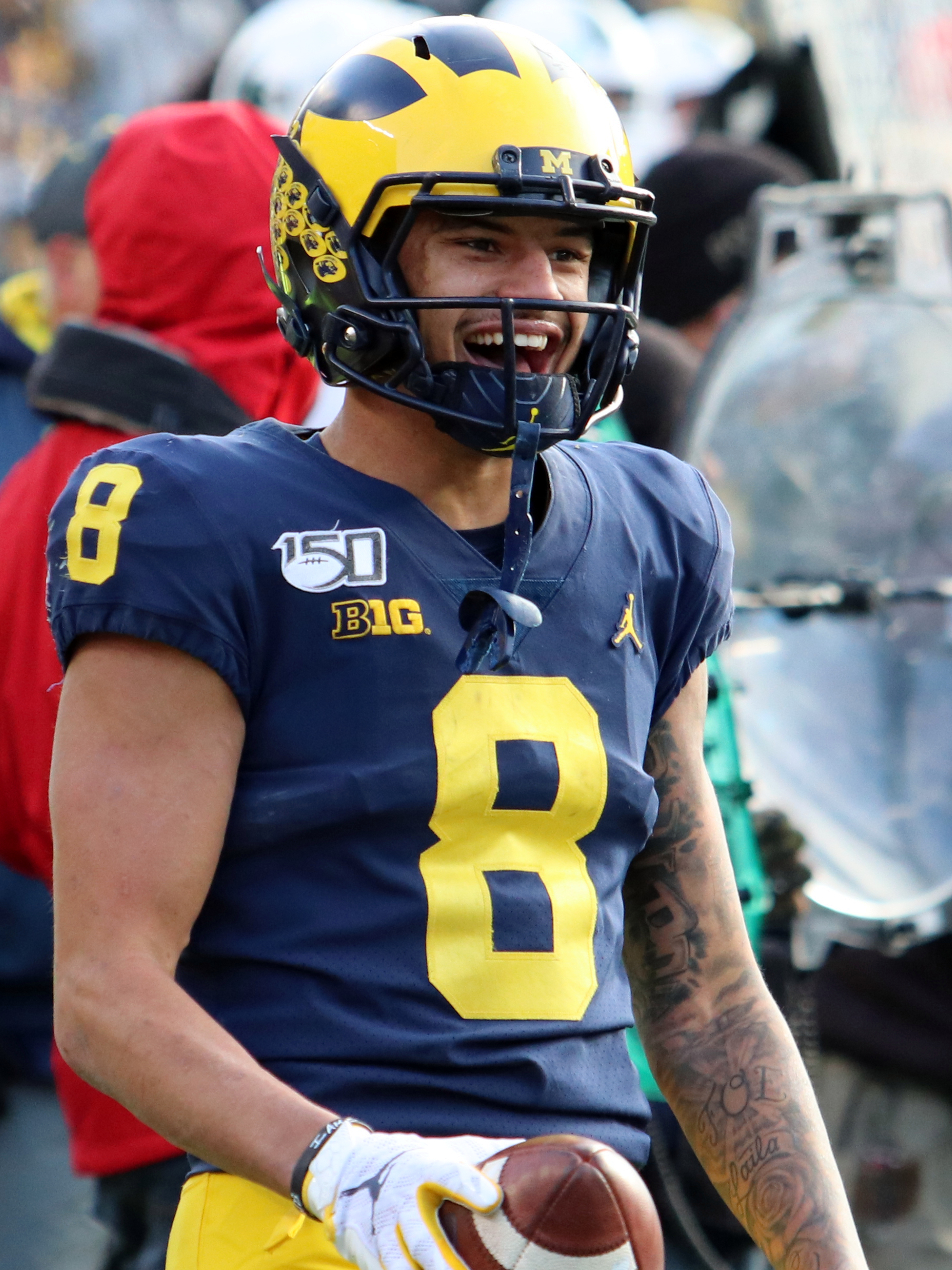
- Bell with the Michigan Wolverines in 2019

No. 37 – Arizona Cardinals
- Position: Wide receiver
- Roster status: Practice squad

Personal information
- Born: January 28, 2000 (age 26); Kansas City, Missouri, U.S.
- Listed height: 6 ft 0 in (1.83 m)
- Listed weight: 192 lb (87 kg)

Career information
- High school: Park Hill (Kansas City)
- College: Michigan (2018–2022)
- NFL draft: 2023: 7th round, 253rd overall pick

Career history
- San Francisco 49ers (2023–2024); Detroit Lions (2025)*; New Orleans Saints (2025); Las Vegas Raiders (2026)*; Arizona Cardinals (2026–present)*
- * Offseason or practice squad member only

Awards and highlights
- Third-team All-Big Ten (2022)

Career NFL statistics as of 2025
- Receptions: 10
- Receiving yards: 113
- Receiving touchdowns: 4
- Stats at Pro Football Reference

Ronald Darius Bell (born January 28, 2000) is an American professional football wide receiver for the Arizona Cardinals of the National Football League (NFL). He played college football for the Michigan Wolverines, where he was named an All-Big Ten selection in 2022. He was selected by the San Francisco 49ers in the 2023 NFL draft.

== Early life ==
Bell was a multi-sport athlete at Park Hill High School in Kansas City, Missouri. As a senior, he caught 89 passes for 1,605 yards and 21 touchdowns, but he was not ranked in the top 1,000 high school football recruits. He originally committed as a basketball player to Missouri State University. After initially receiving no Division I FBS scholarship offers to play football, he was recruited late by Jim Harbaugh and in December 2017 committed to play football for the University of Michigan. In 2022, he graduated from Michigan's College of Literature, Science, and the Arts with a Bachelor in General Studies.

== College career ==
Bell enrolled at Michigan in 2018. As a freshman, he had eight receptions for 145 yards and two touchdowns, including a 56-yard touchdown reception against Nebraska. At the end of the 2018 season, he received the offensive rookie of the year award.

As a sophomore in 2019, Bell led the team with 81 receiving yards against Army, 81 yards against Wisconsin, 83 yards against Rutgers, 98 yards against Illinois, and 82 yards against Penn State. After dropping a game-tying pass in the end zone in the closing minutes against Penn State, Bell received national attention for the angry reaction by a Michigan fan and the subsequent rally of fan support behind him.

Against Michigan State on November 16, 2019, Bell had a career-high 150 receiving yards (117 in the first half) on nine catches. For the 2019 season, he was the Wolverines' leading receiver with 48 receptions for 758 yards. Following the 2019 season, Bell was named an honorable mention all-conference selection by the media.

In the COVID-19-shortened 2020 season, he was Michigan's leading receiver for the second consecutive year with 26 receptions and 401 receiving yards.

Bell's 2021 season ended when he sustained a knee injury in the season opener.

Against Indiana on October 8, 2022, Bell caught 11 passes for 121 yards. During the 2022 regular season, Bell was the team's leading receiver for the third time in his career with 62 receptions and 889 receiving yards.

== Professional career ==
Pre-draft measurables
Height	Weight	Arm length	Hand span	Wingspan	40-yard dash	10-yard split	20-yard split	20-yard shuttle	Three-cone drill	Vertical jump	Broad jump	Bench press
5 ft 11 5/8 in (1.82 m)	191 lb (87 kg)	31 in (0.79 m)	9 1/2 in (0.24 m)	6 ft 3 in (1.91 m)	4.54 s	1.52 s	2.57 s	4.04 s	6.62 s	38.5 in (0.98 m)	10 ft 0 in (3.05 m)	14 reps
All values from NFL Combine/Pro Day

=== San Francisco 49ers ===
Bell was drafted by the San Francisco 49ers in the seventh round, 253rd overall, of the 2023 NFL draft. He was the last of nine Wolverines drafted in 2023.

During a Week 3 30–12 victory over the New York Giants, Bell caught his first pass, a 9-yard touchdown reception, from quarterback Brock Purdy. Bell finished the game with two receptions for 24 yards and a touchdown. In Week 18 in a 21–20 loss to the Los Angeles Rams, Bell had a career high 5 targets, thanks to the 49ers sitting their best players due to already clinching the #1 seed in the National Football Conference. He only had one catch, a 5-yard touchdown. He appeared in all 17 games as rookie. He finished with six receptions for 68 yards and three touchdowns. On November 29, 2024, Bell was waived by the 49ers and re-signed to the practice squad four days later.

=== Detroit Lions ===
On January 21, 2025, Bell signed a reserve/future contract with the Detroit Lions. He was waived on August 26 as part of final roster cuts, and re-signed to the practice squad. On September 30, Bell was released.

=== New Orleans Saints ===
On October 7, 2025, Bell signed with the New Orleans Saints' practice squad. On December 28, Bell was elevated to the game roster for the team's Week 17 game against the Tennessee Titans. On January 2, 2026, he was signed to the active roster. In a Week 18 loss to the Atlanta Falcons, Bell recorded two receptions for 23 yards, one of which being a touchdown reception for 16 yards.

On August 29, 2026, Bell was waived by the Saints as a part of preliminary roster cuts.

=== Las Vegas Raiders ===
On September 3, 2026, Bell was signed to the Las Vegas Raiders' practice squad. On September 28, he was released.

=== Arizona Cardinals ===
On November 17, 2026, Bell signed with the Arizona Cardinals practice squad.

== Career statistics ==
=== NFL ===
Legend
**Bold**	Career best

==== Regular season ====
Year	Team	Games		Receiving					Fumbles	
Year	Team	GP	GS	Rec	Yds	Avg	Lng	TD	Fum	Lost
2023	SF	17	0	6	68	11.3	20	3	1	0
2024	SF	9	0	2	22	11	12	0	0	0
2025	NO	2	0	2	23	11.5	16	1	0	0
Career		28	0	10	113	11.3	20	4	1	0

=== College ===
Year	Team	G	Receiving				Rushing				Returns			
Year	Team	G	Rec	Yds	Avg	TD	Att	Yds	Avg	TD	Ret	Yds	Avg	TD
2018	Michigan	13	8	145	18.1	2	**5**	-2	-0.4	0	4	60	15.0	0
2019	Michigan	13	48	758	15.8	1	1	9	**9.0**	0	**8**	**67**	8.4	0
2020	Michigan	6	26	401	15.4	1	0	0	0	0	0	0	0	0
2021	Michigan	1	1	76	**76.0**	1	0	0	0	0	1	31	**31.0**	0
2022	Michigan	**14**	**62**	**889**	14.3	**4**	3	**23**	7.7	**1**	2	45	22.5	0
Career		47	145	2,269	15.6	9	9	30	3.3	1	15	203	13.5	0
All values from Michigan Athletics
