= Joshua Uche =

American football player (born 1998)

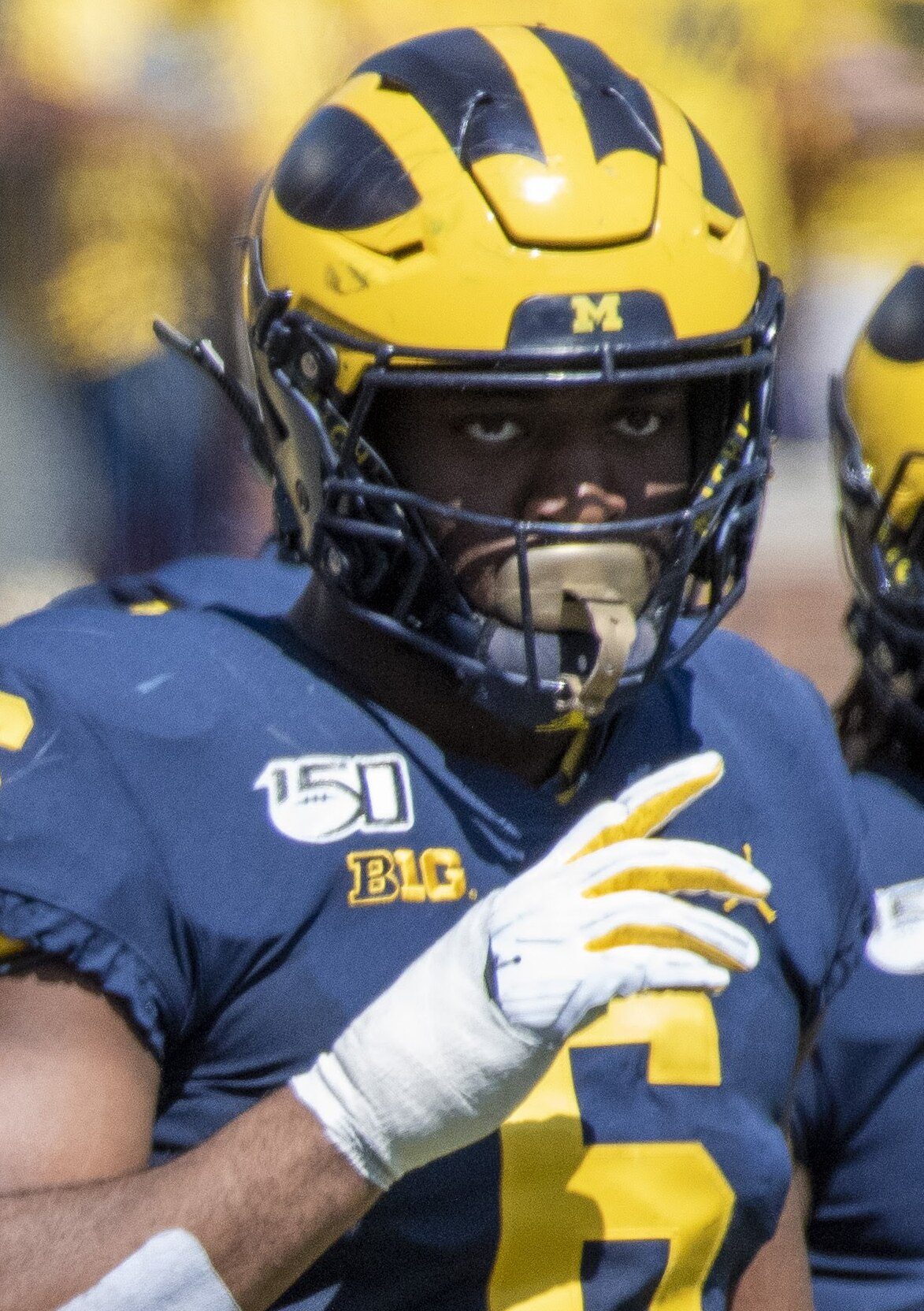
- Uche with the Michigan Wolverines in 2019

No. 9 – Miami Dolphins
- Position: Linebacker
- Roster status: Active

Personal information
- Born: September 18, 1998 (age 28); Miami, Florida, U.S.
- Listed height: 6 ft 1 in (1.85 m)
- Listed weight: 252 lb (114 kg)

Career information
- High school: Columbus (FL)
- College: Michigan (2016–2019)
- NFL draft: 2020: 2nd round, 60th overall pick

Career history
- New England Patriots (2020–2024); Kansas City Chiefs (2024); Philadelphia Eagles (2025); Miami Dolphins (2026–present)

Awards and highlights
- Second-team All-Big Ten (2019)

Career NFL statistics as of Week 5, 2026
- Total tackles: 129
- Sacks: 22.5
- Forced fumbles: 3
- Fumble recoveries: 2
- Pass deflections: 1
- Stats at Pro Football Reference

Joshua Ikechukwu Uche (/uˈʃeɪ/, oo-SHAY) (born September 18, 1998) is an American professional football linebacker for the Miami Dolphins of the National Football League (NFL). He played college football for the Michigan Wolverines and was selected by the New England Patriots in the second round of the 2020 NFL draft.

== Early life ==
Uche was born in 1998, the son of Nigerian immigrants, and grew up in Miami, Florida. He attended Christopher Columbus High School in Miami.

== College career ==
Uche attended the University of Michigan on a football scholarship. As a freshman in 2016, Uche tore his meniscus, caught a "bad virus" and appeared in only four games. As a sophomore in 2017, he sustained a stress fracture and saw limited action in 10 games. After the 2017 season, Uche was frustrated with his lack of playing time. He recalled: "I just felt like I was useless at the time. It was just frustrating to me because I wanted to be out there with my teammates, helping, contributing and doing something to just help the team win. When I wouldn't be able to do that, I just questioned if this was the right fit for me." Uche met with defensive coordinator Don Brown to express his frustration and ask for more playing time in 2018. Brown replied: "Well go earn it, how about that? How about go earn it?"

As a junior in 2018, Uche appeared in 12 games at linebacker. He had eight tackles for loss and led the team with seven sacks. In November 2018, the Detroit Free Press described him as "the most surprising player on the nation's top-ranked defense." Michigan head coach Jim Harbaugh described Uche as "highly determined and motivated. He's a really special player as well." At the end of the 2018 season, he received honorable mention from both the coaches and media on the 2018 All-Big Ten Conference football team.

During the 2019 season, Uche recorded a career-high 34 tackles, including 23 solo stops. His 11.5 tackles for loss were second-most on the team, while his 8.5 sacks led the team. Uche's 8.5 sacks was tied for 14th most in a single season in Michigan program history. Following the season, Uche was named to the 2019 All-Big Ten defensive second-team by the coaches. It was announced that Uche would forgo his final year of eligibility and declare for the 2020 NFL draft. His final amateur game was the 2020 Senior Bowl.

== Professional career ==
Pre-draft measurables
Height	Weight	Arm length	Hand span	Wingspan	Bench press
6 ft 1 1/4 in (1.86 m)	245 lb (111 kg)	33 5/8 in (0.85 m)	9 1/2 in (0.24 m)	6 ft 8 in (2.03 m)	18 reps
All values from NFL Combine

=== New England Patriots ===
Uche was selected with the 60th pick in the 2020 NFL draft by the New England Patriots. Uche was the second (of three) Michigan linebackers the Patriots drafted in consecutive years, following Chase Winovich and preceding Cameron McGrone. He was placed on injured reserve on September 26, 2020, with a foot injury. He was activated on October 31.

In Week 10 against the Baltimore Ravens on Sunday Night Football, Uche recorded his first career sack on Lamar Jackson during the 23–17 win. On December 31, 2020, Uche was placed on injured reserve.

Uche entered the 2021 season as a rotational outside linebacker and pass rusher for the Patriots. He was placed on injured reserve on November 17, 2021. He was activated on December 25.

Uche had a breakout year in 2022. Starting off slow, Uche got his first sack of the season in Week 8, then followed it up with a three-sack performance against the Indianapolis Colts in Week 9. In Week 14, had five tackles, three sacks, and three tackles for loss in a 27–13 win over the Arizona Cardinals, earning AFC Defensive Player of the Week. He finished the season second on the team with 11.5 sacks, along with 27 tackles and two forced fumbles through 15 games.

On March 13, 2024, Uche re-signed with the Patriots.

=== Kansas City Chiefs ===
On October 28, 2024, Uche was traded to the Kansas City Chiefs for a 2026 sixth-round pick.

=== Philadelphia Eagles ===
On March 13, 2025, Uche signed a one-year contract with the Philadelphia Eagles.

=== Miami Dolphins ===
On March 12, 2026, Uche signed a one-year contract with the Miami Dolphins.
