= Giles Jackson =

American football player (born 2001)

Profile
- Position: Wide receiver

Personal information
- Born: December 11, 2001 (age 24); Antioch, California, U.S.
- Listed height: 5 ft 8 in (1.73 m)
- Listed weight: 187 lb (85 kg)

Career information
- High school: Freedom (Oakley, California)
- College: Michigan (2019–2020); Washington (2021–2024)
- NFL draft: 2025: undrafted

Career history
- Philadelphia Eagles (2025)*; Montreal Alouettes (2025)
- * Offseason or practice squad member only

Awards and highlights
- Second-team All-Big Ten (2020)

Giles Jackson (born December 11, 2001) is an American professional football wide receiver and kick returner. He played college football for the Michigan Wolverines and Washington Huskies.

== Early life ==
Jackson grew up in Antioch, California, and attended Freedom High School. As a junior in 2017, he totaled 1,586 rushing yards and 22 touchdowns on 221 carries and caught 21 passes for 324 yards and five touchdowns. He committed to the University of Michigan in September 2018. After committing to Michigan, he had a strong senior season with 63 receptions for 1,254 yards and 13 touchdowns, 38 rushing carries for 207 yards, and a 65-yard punt return for touchdown.

== College career ==
=== University of Michigan ===
==== Freshman season ====
As a 17-year-old freshman in 2019, he played at wide receiver and kick returner and appeared in all 13 games. He became the second freshman in Michigan history (after Gil Chapman) to score touchdowns on kick return, pass reception, and rushing. In the 2020 Citrus Bowl, he caught four passes for 57 yards, including a 40-yard gainer, against Alabama.

On special teams, Jackson returned 24 kickoffs for 622 yards (25.9 yards per return), including a 97-yard return for touchdown in the opening play against Maryland. On offense, he totaled 19 touches for 211 yards in 2019. After Jackson's freshman year, he received honorable mention All-Big Ten honors. Michigan coach Jim Harbaugh said: "We love Giles back there; I think everybody does. He's crazy fast, super talented."

==== Sophomore season ====
During the 2019 season, Jackson wore jersey no. 15. In February 2020, after the NCAA announced that players would be permitted to wear jersey no. 0, Jackson asked for the number. His request was granted, and Jackson in 2020 became the first Michigan football player to wear the number. With the departure of receivers Donovan Peoples-Jones, Tarik Black, and Nico Collins, Jackson was expected to player a larger role in Michigan's offense during the 2020 season.

On November 21, 2020, in a triple-overtime victory over Rutgers, Jackson returned the opening kickoff of the second half 94 yards for a touchdown. He also drew a pass interference penalty that set up the game-winning touchdown in the third overtime period.

Jackson ended the season with 15 catches for 167 yards, and returned 18 kickoffs for 399 yards and a touchdown.

On March 29, 2021, Jackson announced his intentions to transfer from Michigan.

=== College statistics ===
Year	Team	Games		Receiving				Rushing				Kick return				Punt return			
Year	Team	GP	GS	Rec	Yds	Avg	TD	Att	Yds	Avg	TD	Ret	Yds	Avg	TD	Ret	Yds	Avg	TD
2019	Michigan	13	1	9	142	15.8	1	10	69	6.9	1	24	622	25.9	1	—	—	—	—
2020	Michigan	5	3	15	167	11.1	0	2	5	2.5	0	13	354	27.2	1	5	45	9.0	0
2021	Washington	12	3	8	87	10.9	0	8	45	5.6	0	19	442	23.3	0	12	81	6.8	0
2022	Washington	13	5	28	328	11.7	1	9	48	5.3	0	15	312	20.8	0	5	45	9.0	0
2023	Washington	8	1	14	106	7.6	1	—	—	—	—	—	—	—	—	3	10	3.3	0
2024	Washington	13	9	85	893	10.5	7	4	16	4.0	1	—	—	—	—	—	—	—	—
Career		64	22	159	1,723	10.8	10	33	183	5.5	2	71	1,730	24.4	2	25	181	7.2	0

== Professional career ==
Pre-draft measurables
Height	Weight	Arm length	Hand span	40-yard dash	10-yard split	20-yard split	20-yard shuttle	Three-cone drill	Vertical jump	Broad jump	Bench press
5 ft 8 1/8 in (1.73 m)	187 lb (85 kg)	29 3/4 in (0.76 m)	8 1/2 in (0.22 m)	4.50 s	1.56 s	2.58 s	4.24 s	6.76 s	37.5 in (0.95 m)	10 ft 1 in (3.07 m)	12 reps
All values from Pro Day

Jackson signed with the Philadelphia Eagles as an undrafted free agent on May 4, 2025. He was released by Philadelphia on August 20.

On November 21, 2025, Jackson signed with the Montreal Alouettes of the Canadian Football League.

On May 4, 2026, Jackson was released by the Alouettes.
