= 2020 Citrus Bowl =

American college football game

2020 Vrbo Citrus Bowl
- 74th Citrus Bowl
Michigan Wolverines	Alabama Crimson Tide
(9–3)	(10–2)
Big Ten	SEC
16	35
Head coach: Jim Harbaugh	Head coach: Nick Saban
AP / Coaches / CFP; 17 / 17 / 14	AP / Coaches / CFP; 9 / 9 / 13
	1	2	3	4	Total
Michigan	10	6	0	0	16
Alabama	7	7	7	14	35
- Date: January 1, 2020
- Season: 2019
- Stadium: Camping World Stadium
- Location: Orlando, Florida
- MVP: Jerry Jeudy (WR, Alabama)
- Favorite: Alabama by 7.5
- Referee: Michael Mothershed (Pac-12)
- Attendance: 59,746
- Payout: US$8,224,578

United States TV coverage
- Network: ABC and ESPN Radio
- Announcers: ABC: Dave Pasch (play-by-play); Greg McElroy (analyst); Tom Luginbill (sideline); ESPN Radio: Adam Amin, Matt Hasselbeck, Molly McGrath
- Nielsen ratings: 8.0 (14 million viewers)

The 2020 Citrus Bowl was a college football bowl game played on January 1, 2020, with kickoff at 1:00 p.m. EST on ABC. It was the 74th edition of the Citrus Bowl, and was one of the 2019–20 bowl games concluding the 2019 FBS football season. Sponsored by Vrbo, a vacation rental marketplace owned by the HomeAway division of Expedia, the game was officially known as the Vrbo Citrus Bowl.

== Teams ==
The game featured the Michigan Wolverines from the Big Ten Conference and the Alabama Crimson Tide from the Southeastern Conference (SEC). This was the fifth meeting between the two programs; entering the game, the series was tied, 2–2. Most recently they met in the 2012 Cowboys Classic in Arlington, Texas, won by Alabama, 41–14.

=== Michigan Wolverines ===
Michigan entered the game with a 9–3 record (6–3 in conference), ranked 17th in the AP Poll. They finished in third place in the Big Ten's East Division. The Wolverines were 2–3 against ranked opponents, defeating Iowa and Notre Dame while losing to Wisconsin, Penn State, and Ohio State. This was Michigan's sixth Citrus Bowl appearance; they were 4–1 in prior appearances. This was Michigan's 48th bowl game appearance, the 11th-highest total all-time among FBS schools.

=== Alabama Crimson Tide ===
Alabama entered the game with a 10–2 record (6–2 in conference), tied for ninth in the AP Poll. They finished in second place in the SEC's West Division. The Crimson Tide were 1–2 against ranked opponents, defeating Texas A&M while losing to LSU and Auburn. This was Alabama's third Citrus Bowl appearance; they were 2–0 in prior appearances.

== Game summary ==
2020 Vrbo Citrus Bowl

Quarter	1	2	3	4	Total
No. 14 Michigan	10	6	0	0	16
No. 13 Alabama	7	7	7	14	35

at Camping World Stadium • Orlando, Florida

- Date: Wednesday, January 1, 2020
- Game time: 1:00 p.m. EST
- Game weather: Mostly sunny • Temperature: 66 °F (19 °C) • Wind: NNW 5 mph
- Game attendance: 59,746
- Referee: Michael Mothershed
- TV announcers (ABC): Dave Pasch (play-by-play), Greg McElroy (analyst) and Tom Luginbill (sideline)
- ESPN game summary

Game information

First Quarter

- (13:47) BAMA – Mac Jones 85 yard pass to Jerry Jeudy, Joseph Bulovas kick (Drive: 1 play, 85 yards, 0:11; Alabama 7–0)
- (7:06) MICH – Shea Patterson 7 yard pass to Nick Eubanks, Christian Turner kick (Drive: 7 plays, 85 yards, 2:56; Tied 7–7)
- (0:09) MICH – Quinn Nordin 36 yard field goal (Drive: 10 plays, 81 yards, 4:28; Michigan 10–7)

Second Quarter

- (7:16) MICH – Quinn Nordin 42 yard field goal (Drive: 13 plays, 56 yards, 5:43; Michigan 13–7)
- (3:32) BAMA – Najee Harris 9 yard rush, Joseph Bulovas kick (Drive: 8 plays, 75 yards, 3:44; Alabama 14–13)
- (0:00) MICH – Quinn Nordin 57 yard field goal (Drive: 10 plays, 36 yards, 3:32; Michigan 16–14)

Third Quarter

- (13:30) BAMA – Mac Jones 42 yard pass to DeVonta Smith, Joseph Bulovas kick (Drive: 4 plays, 75 yards, 1:30; Alabama 21–16)

Fourth Quarter

- (10:01) BAMA – Mac Jones 20 yard pass to Miller Forristall, Joseph Bulovas kick (Drive: 5 plays, 91 yards, 4:44; Alabama 28–16)
- (0:26) BAMA – Najee Harris 2 yard rush, Joseph Bulovas kick (Drive: 12 plays, 75 yards, 5:49; Alabama 35–16)

=== Statistics ===
Statistics	MICH	BAMA
First downs	23	20
Plays–yards	80–395	55–480
Rushes–yards	43–162	30–153
Passing yards	233	327
Passing: comp–att–int	17–37–2	16–25–0
Time of possession	34:47	25:13

Team	Category	Player	Statistics
Michigan	Passing	Shea Patterson	17/37, 233 yards, 1 TD, 2 INT
Michigan	Rushing	Zach Charbonnet	13 carries, 84 yards
Michigan	Receiving	Giles Jackson	4 receptions, 57 yards
Alabama	Passing	Mac Jones	16/25, 327 yards, 3 TD
Alabama	Rushing	Najee Harris	24 carries, 136 yards, 2 TD
Alabama	Receiving	Jerry Jeudy	6 receptions, 204 yards, 1 TD
