= Trente Jones =

American football player (born 2001)

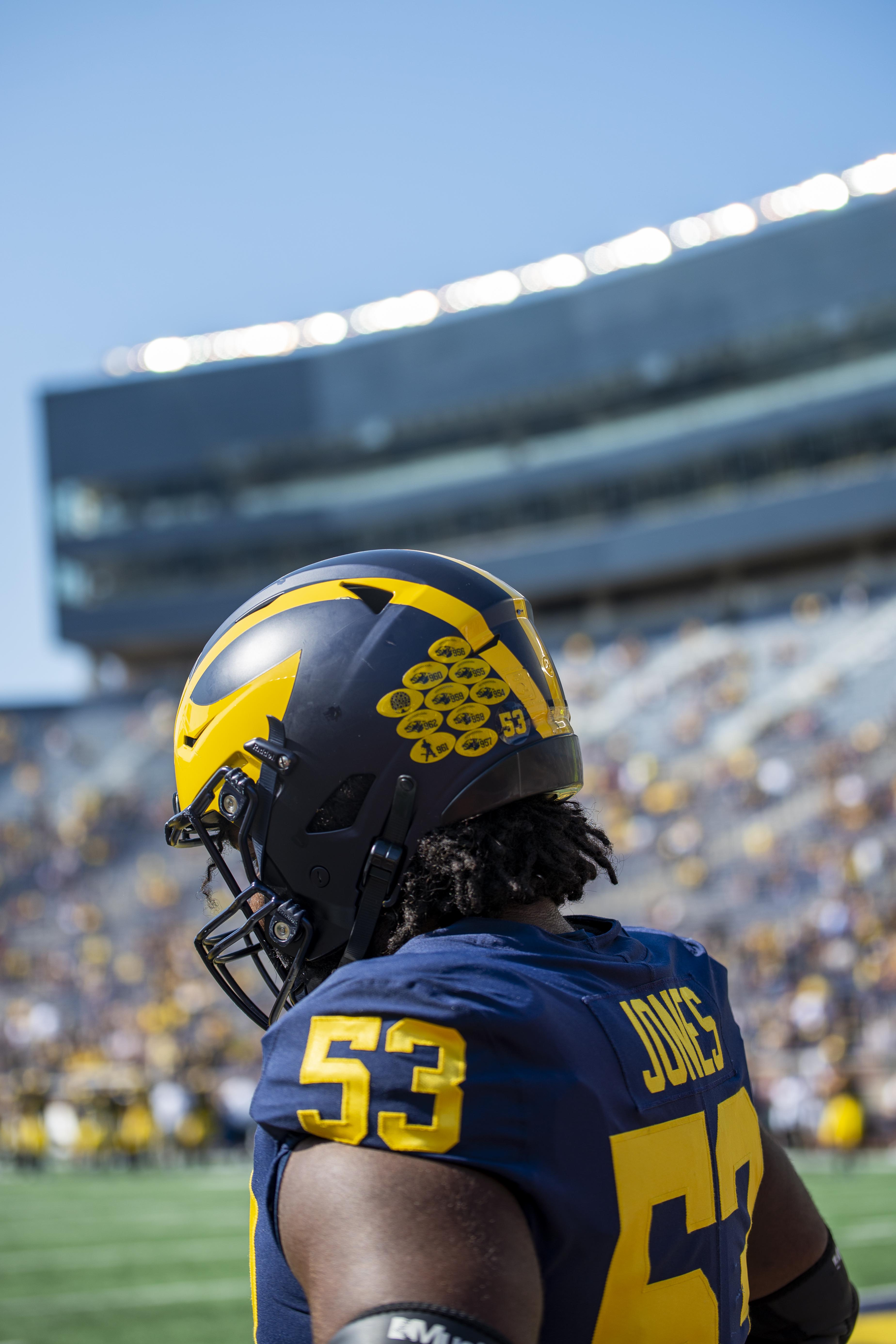
- Jones with the Michigan Wolverines in 2021

No. 68
- Position: Guard

Personal information
- Born: January 15, 2001 (age 25)
- Listed height: 6 ft 4 in (1.93 m)
- Listed weight: 240 lb (109 kg)

Career information
- High school: Grayson (Loganville, Georgia)
- College: Michigan (2019–2023)
- NFL draft: 2024: undrafted

Career history
- Green Bay Packers (2024)*
- * Offseason or practice squad member only

Awards and highlights
- CFP national champion (2023)
- Stats at Pro Football Reference

Trente Jones (tren-TAY; born January 15, 2001) is an American former professional football guard. He played college football for the Michigan Wolverines, winning three consecutive Big Ten Conference titles and a national championship in 2023.

== Early life ==
Jones attended Grayson High School in Grayson, Georgia. He was rated as a four-star recruit and the number 11 offensive tackle nationally. Jones held offers from schools such as Auburn, Arkansas, Florida State, Michigan, Nebraska, Texas A&M, and Tennessee. Jones committed to play college football for the Michigan Wolverines.

== College career ==
Jones enrolled at the University of Michigan in 2019. In his first four seasons, 2019 to 2022, he appeared in 26 games with eight starts. Jones made his first career start in the 2022 season opener against Colorado State.

In week 13 of the 2023 season, after starter Zak Zinter suffered a season-ending injury in a game against rival Ohio State, Jones took over as the team's starting right tackle. Jones started in the Big Ten Championship, the Rose Bowl and the national championship for the Wolverines. Jones appeared in all 15 games in 2023, with five starts, as he helped the Wolverines win the national championship.

== Professional career ==
Pre-draft measurables
| Height | Weight | Arm length | Hand span | 40-yard dash | 10-yard split | 20-yard split | 20-yard shuttle | Three-cone drill | Vertical jump | Broad jump | Bench press |
|---|---|---|---|---|---|---|---|---|---|---|---|
| 6 ft 3 7/8 in (1.93 m) | 305 lb (138 kg) | 33 in (0.84 m) | 10 1/8 in (0.26 m) | 5.17 s | 1.79 s | 2.99 s | 4.87 s | 7.78 s | 27.0 in (0.69 m) | 9 ft 1 in (2.77 m) | 22 reps |
All values from NFL Combine/Pro Day

On April 30, 2024, Jones signed with the Green Bay Packers as an undrafted free agent. He was placed on the reserve/retired list on May 13, 2024.
