= Ben Bredeson =

American football player (born 1998)

- Bredeson with the Tampa Bay Buccaneers in 2026

No. 68 – Tampa Bay Buccaneers
- Position: Guard
- Roster status: Active

Personal information
- Born: February 20, 1998 (age 28); Hartland, Wisconsin, U.S.
- Listed height: 6 ft 5 in (1.96 m)
- Listed weight: 315 lb (143 kg)

Career information
- High school: Arrowhead (Hartland)
- College: Michigan (2016–2019)
- NFL draft: 2020: 4th round, 143rd overall pick

Career history
- Baltimore Ravens (2020); New York Giants (2021–2023); Tampa Bay Buccaneers (2024–present)

Awards and highlights
- Second-team All-American (2019); First-team All-Big Ten (2019); 2× Second-team All-Big Ten (2017, 2018)

Career NFL statistics as of Week 7, 2026
- Games played: 80
- Games started: 60
- Stats at Pro Football Reference

Ben Michael Bredeson (born February 20, 1998) is an American professional football guard for the Tampa Bay Buccaneers of the National Football League (NFL). He was an All-American playing college football for the Michigan Wolverines, and drafted by the Ravens in the 2020 NFL draft. Bredeson attended Arrowhead High School, winning Wisconsin Gatorade Player of the Year and receiving All-American honors by MaxPreps and USA Today.

== Early life ==
He is the son of former Illinois State center, Mike Bredeson, and the middle brother of older brother, Jack, and younger brother, Max Bredeson. Ben Bredeson played high school football at Arrowhead High School and made the varsity team in his freshman year. As a junior he was a first-team All-State selection. As a senior he was again named to the All-State first-team and received first-team All-American honors by MaxPreps and USA Today. Also receiving the Joe Thomas Award, as the top offensive lineman in the state of Wisconsin, and the Gatorade Player of the Year in Wisconsin. Bredeson was among the nation's top high school seniors, invited to the 2016 Under Armour All-America Game.

After receiving 17 scholarship offers, Bredeson cut down his choices to Alabama, Michigan, Notre Dame, Ohio State, Stanford and Wisconsin. On June 17, 2015, he committed to play for the Michigan Wolverines.

College recruiting
Name	Hometown	School	Height	Weight	40^{‡}	Commit date
Ben Bredeson; OT; G	Hartland, Wisconsin	Arrowhead H.S.	6 ft 5 in (1.96 m)	293 lb (133 kg)	5.31	Jun 17, 2015
Ben Bredeson; OT; G	Recruit ratings: Scout: Rivals: 247Sports: (85)					
Overall recruit ranking: Scout: 36 (Natl); 1 (G) Rivals: 2 (G); 60 (Natl); 1 (WI) 247Sports: 39 (Natl); 5 (OT); 1 (WI) ESPN: 4 (OT); 2 (Midwest); 1 (WI)
Note: In many cases, Scout, Rivals, 247Sports, On3, and ESPN may conflict in their listings of height and weight.; In these cases, the average was taken. ESPN grades are on a 100-point scale.; Sources: "Michigan Football Commitments". Rivals.; "2016 Michigan Football Commits". Scout.; "ESPN". ESPN.; "Scout.com Team Recruiting Rankings". Scout.; "2016 Team Ranking". Rivals.com.

== College career ==
In his freshman season at Michigan, Bredeson was switched from offensive tackle to guard, a position he never played in high school. Following the 2017 season, Bredeson was named to the All-Big Ten offensive second-team by both the coaches and the media. After the 2018 season, Bredeson was again named to the All-Big Ten offensive second-team by both the coaches and the media. Following the 2019 season, Bredeson was named to the All-Big Ten offensive first-team by both the coaches and media, and was named a Second-team All-American by Walter Camp Football Foundation.

== Professional career ==
Pre-draft measurables
Height	Weight	Arm length	Hand span	Wingspan
6 ft 4 5/8 in (1.95 m)	315 lb (143 kg)	31 1/8 in (0.79 m)	10 1/8 in (0.26 m)	6 ft 4 3/4 in (1.95 m)
All values from NFL Combine

=== Baltimore Ravens ===
Bredeson was drafted by the Baltimore Ravens in the fourth round (143rd overall) of the 2020 NFL draft.

In his rookie season with the Ravens, Bredeson played in 10 games mostly in a reserve and special teams role and was a healthy scratch for weeks 1-3, 6-7, and 10.

On January 9, 2021, Bredeson was placed on injured reserve.

=== New York Giants ===
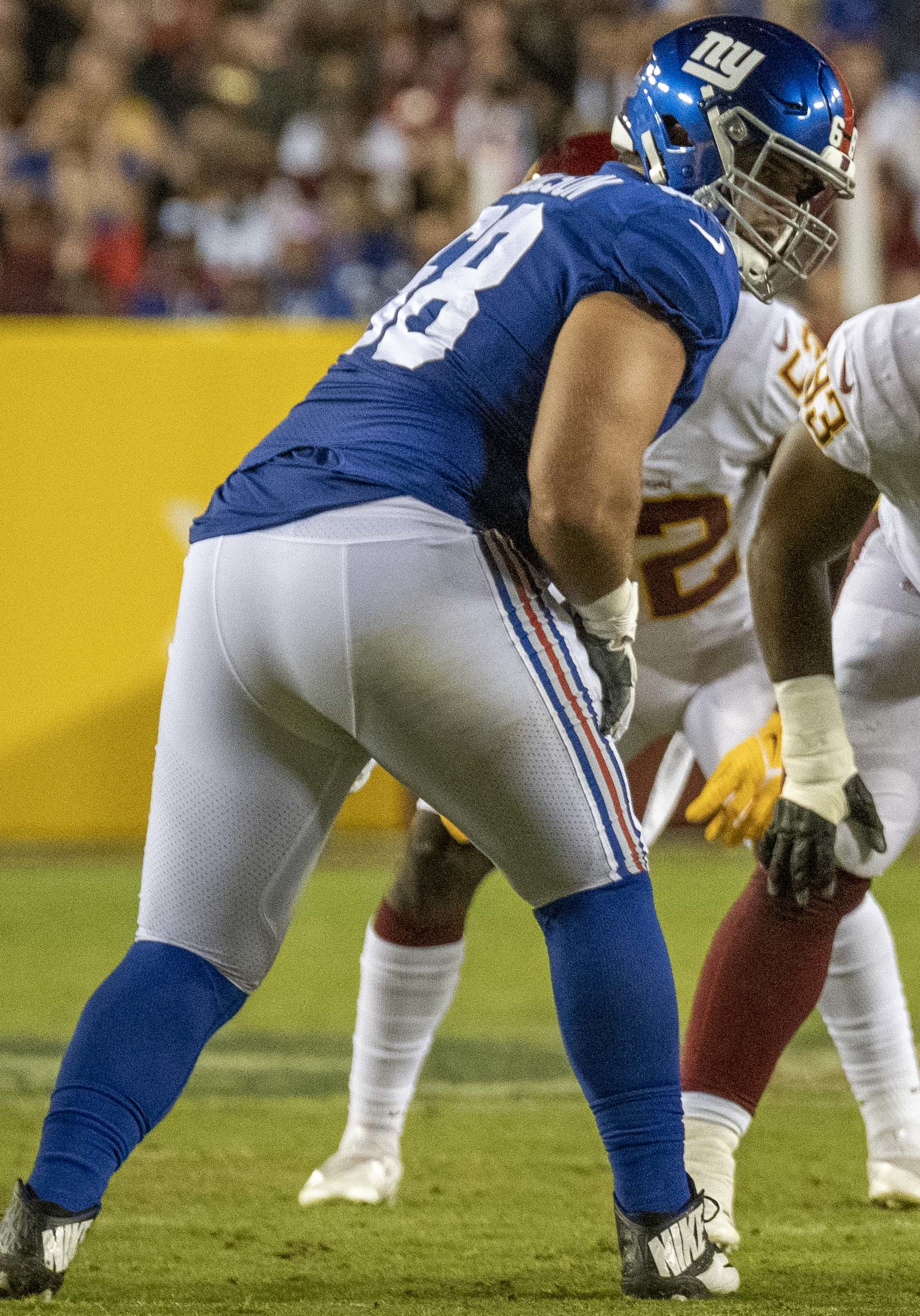
Bredeson with the Giants in 2021

On August 31, 2021, Bredeson was traded to the New York Giants along with a 2022 fifth round pick and a 2023 seventh round pick in exchange for a 2022 fourth round pick. He made his debut for the Giants in week 2 against the Washington Football Team after Nick Gates injured his leg. In Week 3 he made his first career start against the Atlanta Falcons. During the game he injured his hand and was named inactive the following week against the New Orleans Saints.

Bredeson was named the starting left guard Week 1 of the 2022 season after Shane Lemieux got injured during the first preseason game. On October 29, 2022, he was placed on injured reserve with a knee injury. He was activated on December 17.

Bredeson was named the starting left guard Week 1 of the 2023 season after beating Joshua Ezeudu during training camp. On October 15, 2023, Bredeson was moved to right guard after the Giants signed Justin Pugh.

=== Tampa Bay Buccaneers ===
On March 15, 2024, Bredeson signed with the Tampa Bay Buccaneers. He was named the Buccaneers starting left guard, starting all 17 games.

On March 12, 2025, Bredeson signed a three-year, $22 million contract extension with the Buccaneers. He made 11 starts for the team before suffering a knee injury in Week 14 against the New Orleans Saints. On December 9, Bredeson was placed on season-ending injured reserve.
