= Cameron McGrone =

American football player (born 2000)

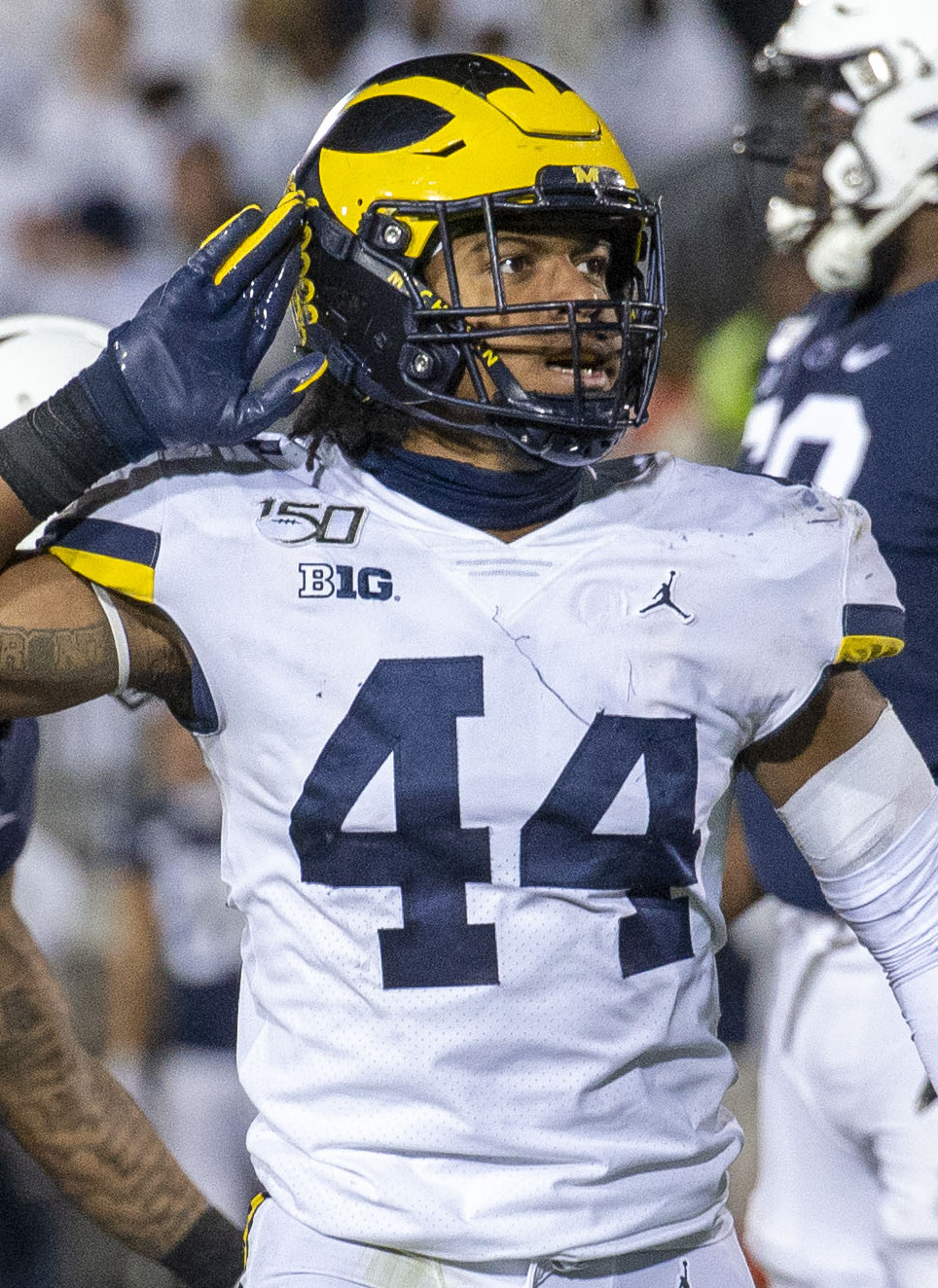
- McGrone with the Michigan Wolverines in 2019

No. 57 – Las Vegas Raiders
- Position: Linebacker
- Roster status: Practice squad

Personal information
- Born: June 22, 2000 (age 26); Indianapolis, Indiana, U.S.
- Listed height: 6 ft 3 in (1.91 m)
- Listed weight: 236 lb (107 kg)

Career information
- High school: Lawrence Central (Indianapolis)
- College: Michigan (2018–2020)
- NFL draft: 2021: 5th round, 177th overall pick

Career history
- New England Patriots (2021–2022); Indianapolis Colts (2022–2025); Cleveland Browns (2025); Las Vegas Raiders (2026–present)*
- * Offseason or practice squad member only

Career NFL statistics as of 2025
- Total tackles: 13
- Stats at Pro Football Reference

Cameron McGrone (born June 22, 2000) is an American professional football linebacker for the Las Vegas Raiders of the National Football League (NFL). He played college football for the Michigan Wolverines, and was drafted by the New England Patriots in the fifth round of the 2021 NFL draft.

== Early life ==
McGrone attended Lawrence Central High School in Indianapolis, Indiana. As a senior, he played in seven games after tearing his ACL the previous year and had 84 tackles and four sacks. McGrone played in the 2018 U.S. Army All-American Game. He committed to the University of Michigan to play college football.

== College career ==
McGrone appeared in one game in his first year at Michigan in 2018. As a redshirt freshman in 2019, he entered the season as a backup but became a starter after starter Josh Ross was injured. Overall, he appeared in 13 games with 10 starts and recorded 66 tackles and four sacks.

=== Statistics ===
Year	GP	Tackles						Fumbles			
Year	GP	Solo	Ast	Total	Loss	Sack	PD	FR	Yards	TD	FF
2018	1	0	0	0	0.0	0.0	0	0	0	0	0
2019	11	38	27	65	9.0	2.5	1	0	0	0	1
2020	5	14	12	26	2.0	0.5	0	0	0	0	0
Career	17	52	39	91	11.0	3.0	1	0	0	0	1

== Professional career ==
Pre-draft measurables
Height	Weight	Arm length	Hand span	Wingspan	Bench press
6 ft 0 7/8 in (1.85 m)	234 lb (106 kg)	32 1/8 in (0.82 m)	9 1/4 in (0.23 m)	6 ft 5 1/2 in (1.97 m)	20 reps
All values from Pro Day

=== New England Patriots ===
McGrone was drafted by the New England Patriots in the 5th round, 177th overall, of the 2021 NFL draft. On May 14, he signed his four-year rookie contract. He was placed on the active/non-football injury list at the start of training camp on July 21, 2021. McGrone was placed on the reserve list on August 31.

On August 30, 2022, McGrone was waived by the Patriots and signed to the practice squad the next day.

=== Indianapolis Colts ===
On December 20, 2022, McGrone was signed by the Indianapolis Colts off the Patriots practice squad.

On January 8, 2024, McGrone signed a one-year contract extension with the Colts. He was placed on injured reserve on August 27. He was activated on October 26. McGrone played in 9 total games for the Colts in 2024, recording 6 combined tackles.

On January 13, 2025, McGrone signed a one-year contract extension with Indianapolis. He was waived on September 30.

=== Cleveland Browns ===
On November 5, 2025, McGrone signed with the Cleveland Browns' practice squad. He made his team debut in Week 11 against the Baltimore Ravens, but suffered an Achilles injury in the contest, necessitating an injured reserve placement on November 20. McGrone was released by the Browns on December 12.

=== Las Vegas Raiders ===
On May 11, 2026, McGrone signed with the Las Vegas Raiders. He was released by the Raiders as a part of final roster cuts on August 30; he was re-signed to the team's practice squad the following day.
