= Jon Runyan Jr. =

American football player (born 1997)

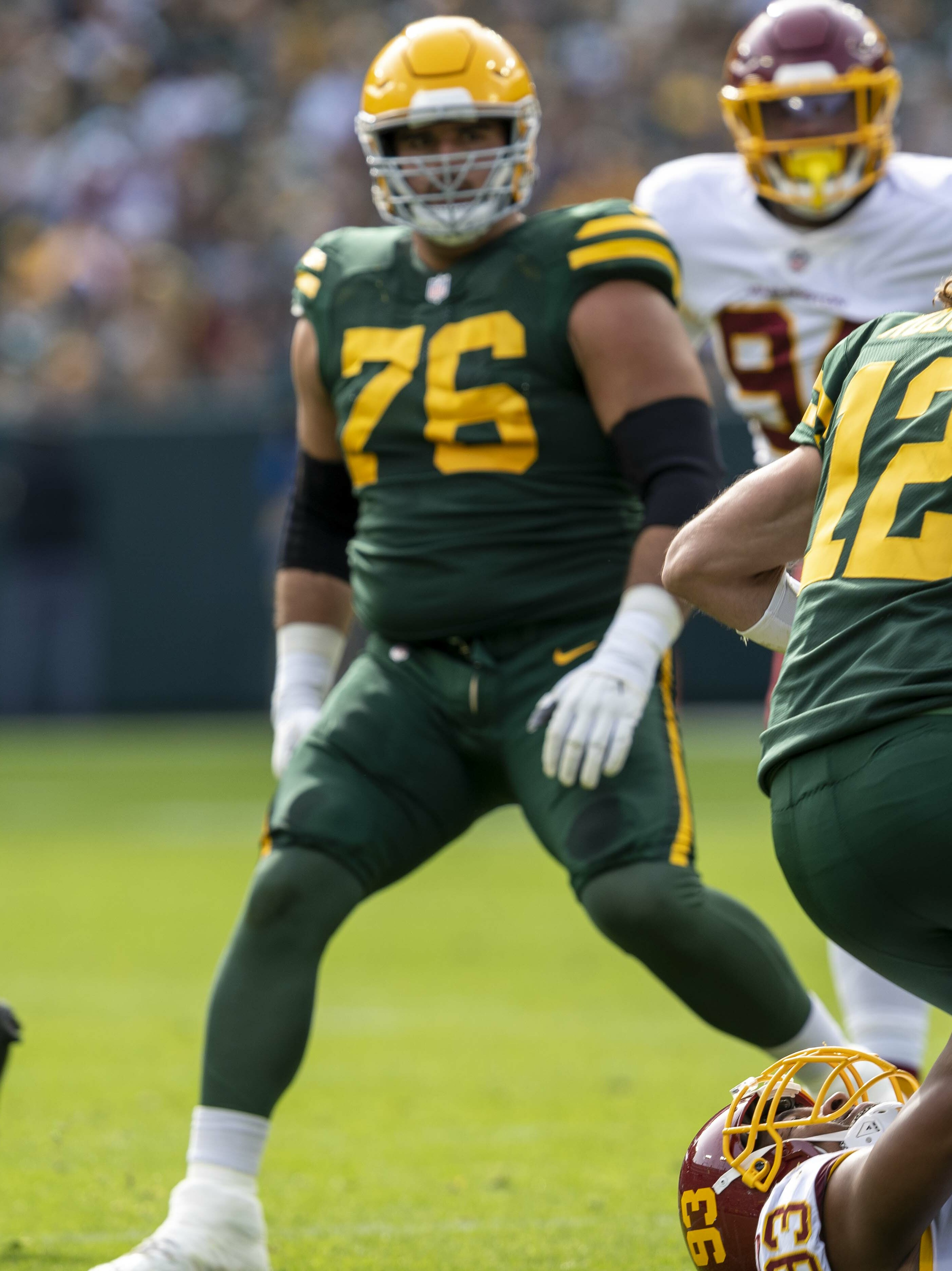
- Runyan Jr. with the Green Bay Packers in 2021

No. 76 – New York Giants
- Position: Guard
- Roster status: Active

Personal information
- Born: August 8, 1997 (age 29); Houston, Texas, U.S.
- Listed height: 6 ft 4 in (1.93 m)
- Listed weight: 307 lb (139 kg)

Career information
- High school: St. Joseph's Preparatory School (Philadelphia, Pennsylvania)
- College: Michigan (2015–2019)
- NFL draft: 2020: 6th round, 192nd overall pick

Career history
- Green Bay Packers (2020–2023); New York Giants (2024–present)

Awards and highlights
- 2× First-team All-Big Ten (2018, 2019)

Career NFL statistics as of 2025
- Games played: 96
- Games started: 79
- Stats at Pro Football Reference

Jon Daniel Runyan Jr. (born August 8, 1997) is an American professional football guard for the New York Giants of the National Football League (NFL). He played college football for the Michigan Wolverines, where he was twice named an All-Big Ten selection. He was selected by the Green Bay Packers in the 2020 NFL draft.

== College career ==
Runyan played offensive tackle at Michigan. He was named first-team All-Big Ten Conference as a junior and senior.

== Professional career ==
Pre-draft measurables
Height	Weight	Arm length	Hand span	Wingspan	40-yard dash	10-yard split	20-yard split	20-yard shuttle	Three-cone drill	Vertical jump	Broad jump	Bench press
6 ft 4 1/4 in (1.94 m)	306 lb (139 kg)	33 1/4 in (0.84 m)	9 1/8 in (0.23 m)	6 ft 7 5/8 in (2.02 m)	5.08 s	1.79 s	2.97 s	4.69 s	7.57 s	30.5 in (0.77 m)	8 ft 11 in (2.72 m)	24 reps
All values from NFL Combine

=== Green Bay Packers ===
Runyan was selected by the Green Bay Packers in the sixth round, with the 192nd overall pick of the 2020 NFL draft. He was signed on June 5, 2020. Runyan saw his first NFL action on September 13, during a Week 1 victory over the Minnesota Vikings, filling in at right guard after starter Lane Taylor and primary backup Lucas Patrick suffered injuries.

=== New York Giants ===
On March 14, 2024, Runyan signed a three-year, $30 million contract with the New York Giants. He made 13 starts for New York during the regular season; his season ended due to a high-ankle sprain and torn deltoid ligament suffered in Week 14. On January 6, 2025, it was announced that Runyan had undergone surgeries to address the injuries.

On September 7, 2026, Runyan signed a two-year, $22 million contract extension with the Giants.

== Personal life ==
A native of Moorestown, New Jersey and graduate of St. Joseph's Preparatory School, Runyan is the son of former NFL player and U.S. Congressman Jon Runyan. During college, he took time to study in Spain.
