= Sean McKeon =

American football player (born 1997)

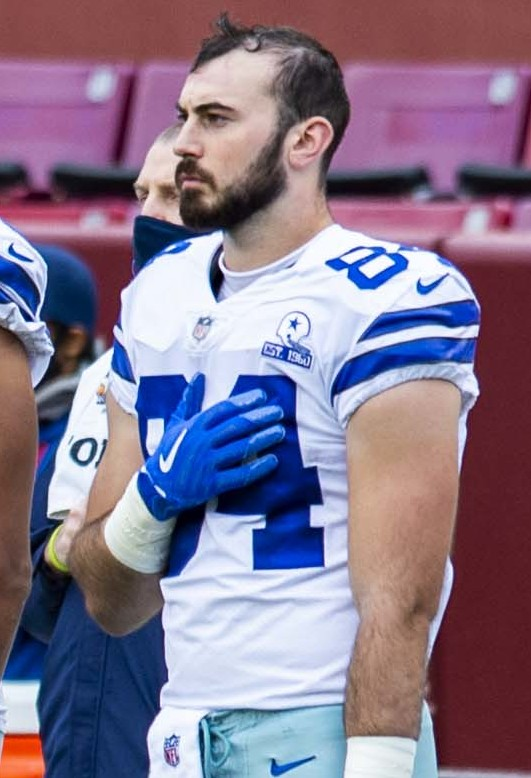
- McKeon with the Dallas Cowboys in 2020

Profile
- Position: Tight end

Personal information
- Born: December 28, 1997 (age 28); Dudley, Massachusetts, U.S.
- Listed height: 6 ft 5 in (1.96 m)
- Listed weight: 255 lb (116 kg)

Career information
- High school: Shepherd Hill Regional (Dudley, Massachusetts)
- College: Michigan (2016–2019)
- NFL draft: 2020: undrafted

Career history
- Dallas Cowboys (2020–2023); Detroit Lions (2024)*; Indianapolis Colts (2024–2025)
- * Offseason or practice squad member only

Career NFL statistics as of 2025
- Receptions: 6
- Receiving yards: 38
- Receiving touchdowns: 1
- Stats at Pro Football Reference

Sean McKeon (born December 28, 1997) is an American professional football tight end. He played college football for the Michigan Wolverines. He has previously played in the NFL for the Dallas Cowboys.

== Early life ==
McKeon attended Shepherd Hill Regional High School. As a sophomore, he only played as a defensive end, totaling 38 tackles (3 for loss), 2 sacks, one pass defensed, one fumble recovery and one blocked a field goal.

As a junior, he was a two-way player at tight end and defensive end, contributing to the team having a 10–2 record and winning the Division 4 Central Region state championship.

As a senior, he played in a run-oriented offense, tallying 23 receptions for 334 yards and 3 touchdowns, while also making 57 tackles (11 for loss), 8 sacks, 2 fumble recoveries and 2 blocked field goals.

He was a two-time USA Today All-State, ESPN Boston All-State, Suite Sports Central Massachusetts All-Star, Central Massachusetts All-Star and Max Prep All-State selection.

== College career ==
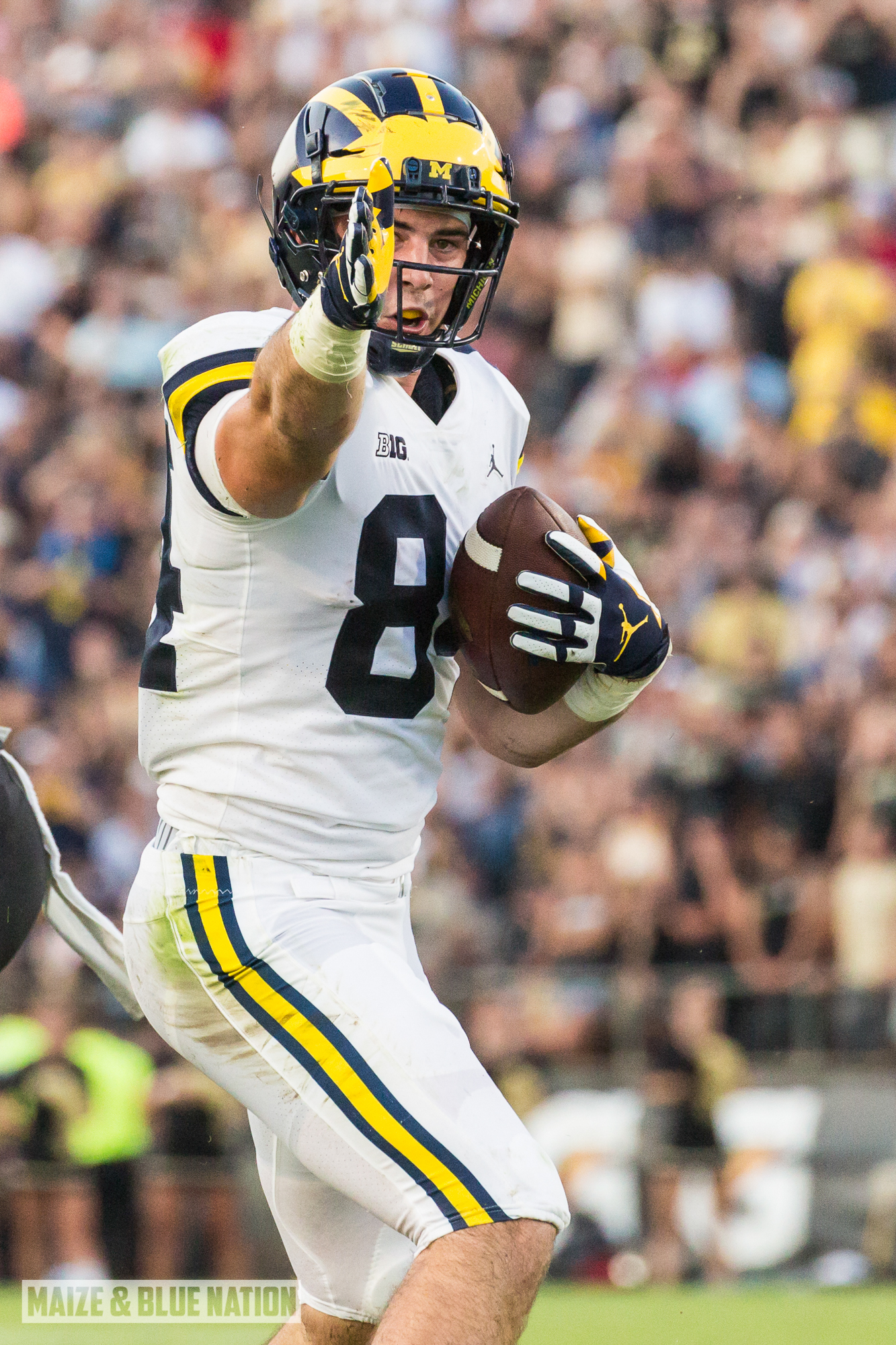
McKeon in 2017

McKeon accepted a football scholarship from the University of Michigan. As a true freshman, he appeared in 4 games as a backup tight end behind Jake Butt. He made 2 receptions for 10 yards.

As a sophomore, he appeared in all 13 games with 10 starts at tight end. He registered 31 receptions (led the team), 301 receiving yards (second on the team) and 3 receiving touchdowns (led the team). He had 5 receptions for 82 yards against Purdue University.

As a junior, he appeared in all 13 games as a backup tight end behind Zach Gentry. He was used mostly for blocking purposes and on the special teams units, posting 14 receptions for 122 yards and one touchdown.

As a senior, he appeared in 10 games with 7 starts, while sharing the tight end duties with Nick Eubanks. He missed 3 games with a leg injury he suffered against the University of Wisconsin. He was used mostly for blocking purposes and on the special teams units, collecting 13 receptions (sixth on the team) for 235 yards (sixth on the team) and 2 receiving touchdowns (fourth on the team).

== Professional career ==
Pre-draft measurables
Height	Weight	Arm length	Hand span	Wingspan	Bench press
6 ft 5 in (1.96 m)	242 lb (110 kg)	33 1/2 in (0.85 m)	9 1/8 in (0.23 m)	6 ft 6 3/4 in (2.00 m)	18 reps
All values from NFL Combine

=== Dallas Cowboys ===
McKeon was signed as an undrafted free agent by the Dallas Cowboys after the 2020 NFL draft on April 27. The team made the unconventional move of keeping him as the fourth tight end to avoid losing him to waivers. He became the third-string tight end, after the starter Blake Jarwin suffered a season-ending knee injury in the first game against the Los Angeles Rams. He appeared in 14 games with one start and played mainly on special teams. In Week 7, he started against the Washington Football Team when the team opened the game with a three tight end formation.

In 2021, he suffered a high ankle sprain in the second preseason game against the Arizona Cardinals. On September 2, 2021, McKeon was placed on injured reserve with an ankle injury. He missed the first 7 games while recovering from the injury and was activated on November 3. On November 14, McKeon registered his first NFL reception while playing against his former High School teammate, Chris Lindstrom and the Atlanta Falcons. On Thanksgiving Day, he caught his first career receiving touchdown, a 10 yard pass from Dak Prescott against the Las Vegas Raiders. In the span of 9 games (2 starts), McKeon recorded 4 catches of 27 and a touchdown. He was the team's third-string tight end behind Dalton Schultz and Jeremy Sprinkle.

In 2022, with the departure of Jarwin, he was competing for the backup tight end position behind Schultz, but fell on the depth chart behind rookies Jake Ferguson and Peyton Hendershot during training camp. On August 30, 2022, McKeon was waived by the Cowboys and signed to the practice squad the next day. He was promoted to the active roster on October 29. He appeared in 13 games, making 2 receptions for 11 yards.

On August 29, 2023, McKeon was waived by the Cowboys and re-signed to the practice squad. On October 12, McKeon was signed to the active roster to provide depth after an injury to Hendershot. He was placed on injured reserve on December 6, which coincided with Hendershot return to the lineup. He appeared in 9 games and did not record any stats. He was not re-signed after the season.

=== Detroit Lions ===
On May 16, 2024, McKeon signed with the Detroit Lions. He was released on August 27.

=== Indianapolis Colts ===
McKeon was signed to the Indianapolis Colts' practice squad on August 29, 2024. He signed a reserve/future contract with the Colts on January 6, 2025.

On August 26, 2025, McKeon was released by the Colts as part of final roster cuts and re-signed to the practice squad the next day. He signed a reserve/future contract with Indianapolis on January 5, 2026. He was placed on injured reserve on August 6, and later released on August 15.
