= Nick Eubanks =

American football player (born 1996)

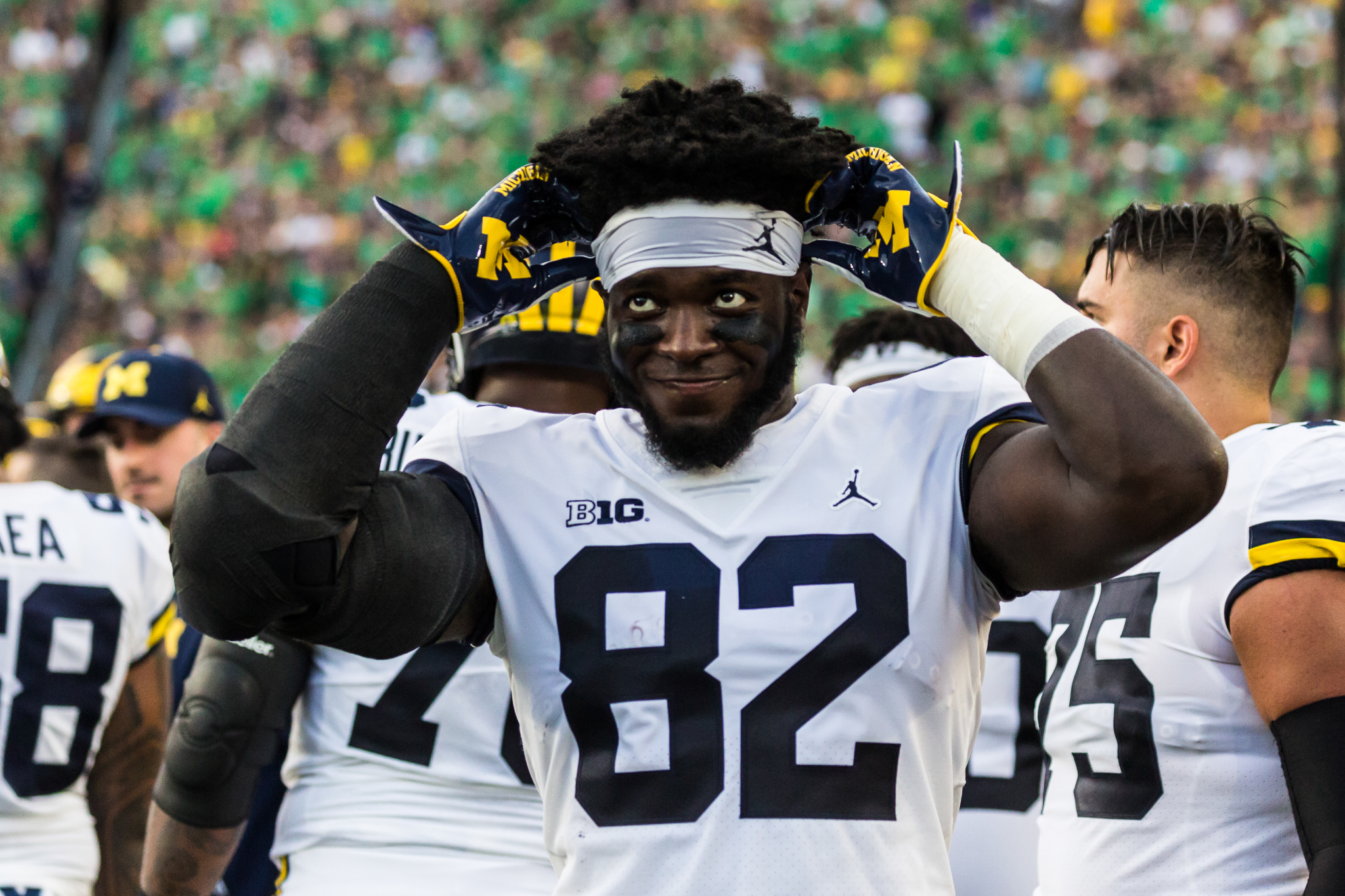
- Eubanks with Michigan in 2018

Profile
- Position: Tight end

Personal information
- Born: November 21, 1996 (age 29); Plantation, Florida, U.S.
- Listed height: 6 ft 5 in (1.96 m)
- Listed weight: 256 lb (116 kg)

Career information
- High school: American Heritage (Plantation, Florida)
- College: Michigan (2016–2020)
- NFL draft: 2021: undrafted

Career history
- Dallas Cowboys (2021)*; Philadelphia Eagles (2021)*; Detroit Lions (2021)*; Cincinnati Bengals (2022)*; Houston Texans (2022)*; Indianapolis Colts (2023)*
- * Offseason or practice squad member only
- Stats at Pro Football Reference

Nick Eubanks (born November 21, 1996) is an American former football tight end. He played college football at Michigan and was signed by the Dallas Cowboys as an undrafted free agent in 2021.

== Early life and education ==
Nick Eubanks was born on November 21, 1996, in Plantation, Florida. He attended American Heritage School there, being ranked the ninth-best tight end and a four-star recruit upon graduation. He accepted a scholarship offer from University of Michigan following his senior year of high school. He made his debut on September 10, 2016, against UCF. As a sophomore in 2017, Eubanks played four games, starting one, before suffering an injury. He recorded two receptions for 61 yards in his four appearances.

As a junior, Eubanks played in all 13 games and started four, making eight catches for 157 yards. He also scored his first career touchdown during this season, earning his second varsity letter. Against Indiana on November 10, he caught a 41-yard pass for his first and longest career score. He earned a starting role as a senior, starting 10 out of a possible 13 games, and making 25 catches for 234 yards and four touchdowns. He was named honorable mention All-Big Ten following the season. He returned to Michigan in 2020, and started four games, leading all Michigan tight ends with 10 receptions for 117 yards and one score.

== Professional career ==
Pre-draft measurables
Height	Weight	Arm length	Hand span	40-yard dash	10-yard split	20-yard split	20-yard shuttle	Three-cone drill	Vertical jump	Broad jump	Bench press
6 ft 4 1/2 in (1.94 m)	245 lb (111 kg)	33 1/4 in (0.84 m)	9 3/4 in (0.25 m)	4.69 s	1.63 s	2.71 s	4.53 s	7.32 s	34.0 in (0.86 m)	10 ft 0 in (3.05 m)	19 reps
All values from Pro Day

=== Dallas Cowboys ===
After going unselected in the 2021 NFL draft, Eubanks was signed as an undrafted free agent by the Dallas Cowboys. He was waived on August 31.

=== Philadelphia Eagles ===
Eubanks was signed to the practice squad of the Philadelphia Eagles two days later. He was released from the practice squad on October 11.

=== Detroit Lions ===
On November 9, 2021, Eubanks was signed to the Detroit Lions practice squad.

=== Cincinnati Bengals ===
Eubanks was signed by the Cincinnati Bengals on April 5, 2022. He was released by the team on August 30, 2022.

=== Houston Texans ===
On October 5, 2022, Eubanks was signed to the Houston Texans practice squad. He was released on October 11.

=== Indianapolis Colts ===
On August 5, 2023, Eubanks signed with the Indianapolis Colts. He was waived on August 27, 2023 as part of final roster cuts before the start of the 2023 season.
