= 2019 Tennessee Volunteers football team =

American college football season

2019 Tennessee Volunteers football

Gator Bowl, W 23–22 (vacated) vs. Indiana
- Conference: Southeastern Conference
- Eastern Division
- Record: 0–5, 8 wins vacated (0–3 SEC, 5 wins vacated)
- Head coach: Jeremy Pruitt (2nd season)
- Offensive coordinator: Jim Chaney (5th season)
- Offensive scheme: Pro-style
- Defensive coordinator: Derrick Ansley (1st season)
- Base defense: 3–4
- Home stadium: Neyland Stadium

Uniform
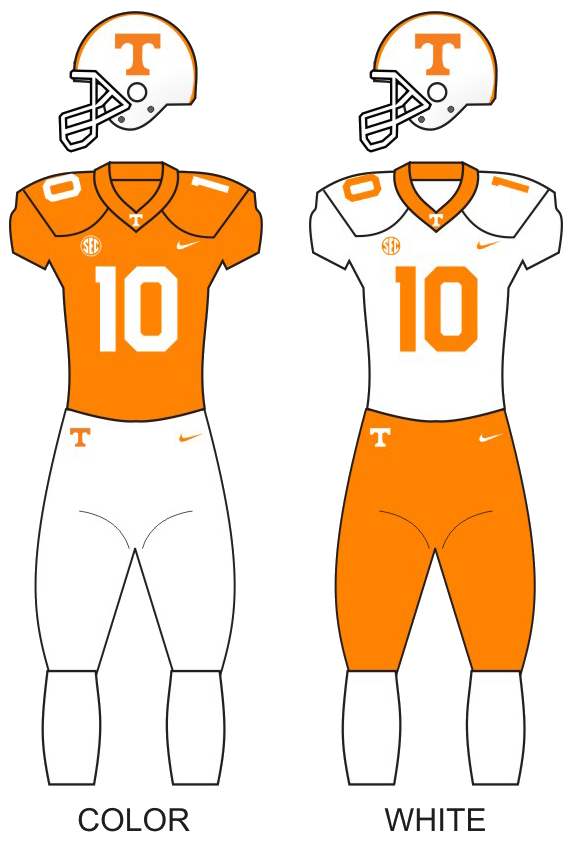

2019 Southeastern Conference football standings
	Conf.			Overall
Team	W		L	W		L
Eastern Division
No. 4 Georgia x	7	–	1	12	–	2
No. 6 Florida	6	–	2	11	–	2
Tennessee *	5	–	3	8	–	5
Kentucky	3	–	5	8	–	5
Missouri *	3	–	5	6	–	6
South Carolina	3	–	5	4	–	8
Vanderbilt	1	–	7	3	–	9
Western Division
No. 1 LSU x$#^	8	–	0	15	–	0
No. 8 Alabama	6	–	2	11	–	2
No. 14 Auburn	5	–	3	9	–	4
Texas A&M	4	–	4	8	–	5
Mississippi State	3	–	5	6	–	7
Ole Miss	2	–	6	4	–	8
Arkansas	0	–	8	2	–	10
Championship: LSU 37, Georgia 10
# – College Football Playoff champion; ^ – College Football Playoff participant; $ – Conference champion; x – Division champion/co-champions; * – Tennessee vacated all wins due to NCAA violations. Missouri was ineligible for postseason due to NCAA sanctions.; Rankings from AP Poll

The 2019 Tennessee Volunteers football team represented the University of Tennessee in the 2019 NCAA Division I FBS football season. The Volunteers played their home games at Neyland Stadium in Knoxville, Tennessee, and competed in the Eastern Division of the Southeastern Conference (SEC). They were led by second-year head coach Jeremy Pruitt.

Tennessee finished the regular season at 7–5 overall, 5–3 in the SEC, and were bowl eligible for the first time since 2016. On January 2, the Volunteers won the Gator Bowl over Indiana. However, in July 2023, the NCAA vacated all of Tennessee's wins as part of disciplinary action due to recruiting violations, affecting the 2019 and 2020 seasons. Thus, the Volunteers are credited with an official record of 0–5 overall and 0–3 in SEC play.

== Preseason ==
=== 2019 recruiting class ===
College recruiting information (2019)
Name	Hometown	School	Height	Weight	Commit date
Darnell Wright; OT	Huntington, WV	Huntington	6 ft 6 in (1.98 m)	300 lb (140 kg)	Feb 6, 2019
Darnell Wright; OT	Recruit ratings: Scout: Rivals: 247Sports: ESPN: (91)				
Wanya Morris; OT	Loganville, GA	Grayson	6 ft 6 in (1.98 m)	312 lb (142 kg)	May 1, 2018
Wanya Morris; OT	Recruit ratings: Scout: Rivals: 247Sports: ESPN: (91)				
Quavaris Crouch; ATH	Charlotte, NC	Harding University	6 ft 3 in (1.91 m)	230 lb (100 kg)	Dec 21, 2018
Quavaris Crouch; ATH	Recruit ratings: Scout: Rivals: 247Sports: ESPN: (86)				
Henry To'oTo'o; OLB	Concord, CA	De La Salle	6 ft 2 in (1.88 m)	225 lb (102 kg)	Feb 6, 2019
Henry To'oTo'o; OLB	Recruit ratings: Scout: Rivals: 247Sports: ESPN: (85)				
Ramel Keyton; WR	Marietta, GA	Marietta	6 ft 3 in (1.91 m)	185 lb (84 kg)	May 16, 2018
Ramel Keyton; WR	Recruit ratings: Scout: Rivals: 247Sports: ESPN: (84)				
Jaylen McCollough; S	Powder Springs, GA	Hillgrove	6 ft 0 in (1.83 m)	194 lb (88 kg)	Aug 17, 2018
Jaylen McCollough; S	Recruit ratings: Scout: Rivals: 247Sports: ESPN: (83)				
Eric Gray; RB	Memphis, TN	Lausanne Collegiate School	5 ft 10 in (1.78 m)	193 lb (88 kg)	Dec 20, 2018
Eric Gray; RB	Recruit ratings: Scout: Rivals: 247Sports: ESPN: (81)				
Anthony Harris; S	Havelock, NC	Havelock	6 ft 2 in (1.88 m)	171 lb (78 kg)	Jun 8, 2018
Anthony Harris; S	Recruit ratings: Scout: Rivals: 247Sports: ESPN: (81)				
Tyus Fields; CB	Cornelius, NC	William Amos Hough	5 ft 10 in (1.78 m)	190 lb (86 kg)	Jul 28, 2018
Tyus Fields; CB	Recruit ratings: Scout: Rivals: 247Sports: ESPN: (82)				
Jackson Lampley; OG	Nashville, TN	Montgomery Bell	6 ft 4 in (1.93 m)	300 lb (140 kg)	Feb 8, 2018
Jackson Lampley; OG	Recruit ratings: Scout: Rivals: 247Sports: ESPN: (82)				
Jackson Lowe; TE	Cartersville, GA	Cartersville	6 ft 5 in (1.96 m)	235 lb (107 kg)	Feb 8, 2018
Jackson Lowe; TE	Recruit ratings: Scout: Rivals: 247Sports: ESPN: (82)				
Roman Harrison; DE	Bainbridge, GA	Bainbridge	6 ft 2 in (1.88 m)	235 lb (107 kg)	Jul 25, 2018
Roman Harrison; DE	Recruit ratings: Scout: Rivals: 247Sports: ESPN: (77)				
Savion Williams; DT	Upper Marlboro, MD	Lackawanna C.C.	6 ft 4 in (1.93 m)	300 lb (140 kg)	Jul 31, 2018
Savion Williams; DT	Recruit ratings: Scout: Rivals: 247Sports: ESPN: (81)				
Melvin McBride; OG	Memphis, TN	Whitehaven	6 ft 3 in (1.91 m)	312 lb (142 kg)	Aug 22, 2018
Melvin McBride; OG	Recruit ratings: Scout: Rivals: 247Sports: ESPN: (79)				
Brian Maurer; QB	Ocala, FL	Westport	6 ft 3 in (1.91 m)	199 lb (90 kg)	Jun 27, 2018
Brian Maurer; QB	Recruit ratings: Scout: Rivals: 247Sports: ESPN: (80)				
Aaron Beasley; ATH	Franklin, GA	Heard County	6 ft 1 in (1.85 m)	210 lb (95 kg)	Jun 10, 2018
Aaron Beasley; ATH	Recruit ratings: Scout: Rivals: 247Sports: ESPN: (79)				
Warren Burrell; CB	Suwanee, GA	Gwinnett	6 ft 0 in (1.83 m)	170 lb (77 kg)	Jul 27, 2018
Warren Burrell; CB	Recruit ratings: Scout: Rivals: 247Sports: ESPN: (77)				
Darel Middleton; DT	Scooba, MS	East Mississippi C.C.	6 ft 7 in (2.01 m)	290 lb (130 kg)	Dec 20, 2018
Darel Middleton; DT	Recruit ratings: Scout: Rivals: 247Sports: ESPN: (78)				
Sean Brown; TE	Rome, GA	Coosa	6 ft 5 in (1.96 m)	250 lb (110 kg)	May 12, 2018
Sean Brown; TE	Recruit ratings: Scout: Rivals: 247Sports: ESPN: (78)				
Elijah Simmons; DT	Nashville, TN	Pearl Cohn	6 ft 0 in (1.83 m)	350 lb (160 kg)	Jul 16, 2018
Elijah Simmons; DT	Recruit ratings: Scout: Rivals: 247Sports: ESPN: (76)				
Chris Akporoghene; OT	Bradenton, FL	IMG Academy	6 ft 4 in (1.93 m)	295 lb (134 kg)	Jul 9, 2018
Chris Akporoghene; OT	Recruit ratings: Scout: Rivals: 247Sports: ESPN: (79)				
Kenney Soloman; CB	Myrtle Beach, SC	Socastee	6 ft 0 in (1.83 m)	172 lb (78 kg)	Feb 6, 2019
Kenney Soloman; CB	Recruit ratings: Rivals: 247Sports: ESPN: (75)				
Jerrod Means; WR	Hampton, GA	Lovejoy	6 ft 2 in (1.88 m)	212 lb (96 kg)	Dec 19, 2018
Jerrod Means; WR	Recruit ratings: Rivals: 247Sports: ESPN: (73)				
Overall recruit ranking: Rivals: 12 247Sports: 12 ESPN: 11
Note: In many cases, Scout, Rivals, 247Sports, On3, and ESPN may conflict in their listings of height and weight.; In these cases, the average was taken. ESPN grades are on a 100-point scale.; Sources: "2019 Team Ranking". Rivals.com.

=== SEC media poll ===
The 2019 SEC Media Days were held July 15–18 in Birmingham, Alabama. In the preseason media poll, Tennessee was projected to finish in fifth in the East Division.

=== Preseason All-SEC teams ===
The Volunteers had one player selected to the preseason all-SEC teams.

Specialists

2nd team

Marquez Callaway – return specialist

== Schedule ==
Tennessee announced its 2019 football schedule on September 18, 2018. The 2019 schedule consisted of eight home and four away games in the regular season.

Date	Time	Opponent	Site	TV	Result	Attendance
August 31	3:30 p.m.	Georgia State*	Neyland Stadium; Knoxville, TN	ESPNU	L 30–38	85,503
September 7	7:00 p.m.	BYU*	Neyland Stadium; Knoxville, TN	ESPN	L 26–29 ^{2OT}	92,475
September 14	12:00 p.m.	Chattanooga*	Neyland Stadium; Knoxville, TN	SECN	W 45–0 (vacated)	86,208
September 21	12:00 p.m.	at No. 9 Florida	Ben Hill Griffin Stadium; Gainesville, FL (rivalry)	ESPN	L 3–34	82,276
October 5	7:00 p.m.	No. 3 Georgia	Neyland Stadium; Knoxville, TN (rivalry / SEC Nation)	ESPN	L 14–43	92,709
October 12	12:00 p.m.	Mississippi State	Neyland Stadium; Knoxville, TN	SECN	W 20–10 (vacated)	85,462
October 19	9:00 p.m.	at No. 1 Alabama	Bryant–Denny Stadium; Tuscaloosa, AL (Third Saturday in October)	ESPN	L 13–35	101,821
October 26	4:00 p.m.	South Carolina	Neyland Stadium; Knoxville, TN (rivalry)	SECN	W 41–21 (vacated)	87,397
November 2	7:00 p.m.	UAB*^{†}	Neyland Stadium; Knoxville, TN	ESPNU	W 30–7 (vacated)	85,791
November 9	7:30 p.m.	at Kentucky	Kroger Field; Lexington, KY (rivalry)	SECN	W 17–13 (vacated)	56,760
November 23	7:30 p.m.	at Missouri	Faurot Field; Columbia, MO	SECN	W 24–20 (vacated)	49,348
November 30	4:00 p.m.	Vanderbilt	Neyland Stadium; Knoxville, TN (rivalry)	SECN	W 28–10 (vacated)	87,367
January 2, 2020	7:00 p.m.	vs. Indiana*	TIAA Bank Field; Jacksonville, FL (Gator Bowl)	ESPN	W 23–22 (vacated)	61,789
*Non-conference game; ^{†}Homecoming; Rankings from AP Poll and CFP Rankings after November 5 released prior to game; All times are in Eastern time

Schedule source:

== Game summaries ==
=== Georgia State ===
Team	1	2	3	4	Total
• Georgia State	7	7	7	17	38
Tennessee	14	3	3	10	30

- Location: Knoxville, Tennessee
- Game start: 3:30 p.m.
- Elapsed time: 3:21
- Game attendance: 85,503
- Game weather: Temperature: 89 °F (32 °C) • Wind: 5 mph (8.0 km/h) • Weather: Sunny
- Referee: Marc Curles
- TV announcers (ESPNU): Clay Matvick (play-by-play), Ryan Leaf (color), Stormy Buonantony (sideline)

Scoring summary
1	12:00	GSU	Seth Paige 4-yard run, (Brandon Wright kick)	GSU 7–0
1	4:13	TENN	Marquez Callaway 6-yard pass from Jarrett Guarantano (Brent Cimaglia kick)	Tied 7–7
1	0:09	TENN	Ty Chandler 31-yard run (Cimaglia kick)	TENN 14–7
2	3:11	GSU	Cornelius McCoy 17-yard pass from Dan Ellington (Wright kick)	Tied 14–14
2	0:00	TENN	Cimaglia 19-yard field goal	TENN 17–14
3	10:30	GSU	Aubry Payne 6-yard pass from Ellington (Wright kick)	GSU 21–17
3	3:32	TENN	Cimaglia 48-yard field goal	GSU 21–20
4	12:05	TENN	Cimaglia 48-yard field goal	TENN 23–21
4	8:56	GSU	Tra Barnett 19-yard run (Wright kick)	GSU 28–23
4	4:45	GSU	Dan Ellington 22-yard run (Wright kick)	GSU 35–23
4	2:37	GSU	Wright 48-yard field goal	GSU 38–23
4	0:02	TENN	Jauan Jennings 18-yard pass from Guarantano (Cimaglia kick)	GSU 38–30

=== BYU ===
BYU at Tennessee

Team	1	2	3	4	OT	2OT	Total
• BYU	3	0	7	6	7	6	29
Tennessee	7	6	0	3	7	3	26

- Date: September 7
- Location: Knoxville, Tennessee
- Game start: 7:05 EDT
- Elapsed time: 3:25
- Game attendance: 92,475
- Game weather: Temperature: 82 °F (28 °C) • Wind: 3 mph (4.8 km/h) • Weather: Sunny
- Referee: Brandon Cruse
- TV announcers (ESPN): Dave Pasch (play-by-play), Greg McElroy (color), Tom Luginbill (sidelines)

=== Chattanooga ===
Chattanooga at Tennessee

Team	1	2	3	4	Total
Chattanooga	0	0	0	0	0
• Tennessee	21	17	7	0	45

- Date: September 14
- Location: Knoxville, Tennessee
- Game start: 12:05 EDT
- Elapsed time: 2:53
- Game attendance: 86,208
- Game weather: Temperature: 84 °F (29 °C) • Wind: 3 mph (4.8 km/h) • Weather: Partly Cloudy
- Referee: Ken Williamson
- TV announcers (SECN): Taylor Zarzour (play-by-play), Matt Stinchcomb (color), Alyssa Lang (sidelines)

=== At Florida ===
Tennessee at Florida

Team	1	2	3	4	Total
Tennessee	0	0	3	0	3
• No. 9 Florida	7	10	7	10	34

- Date: September 21
- Location: Gainesville, Florida
- Game start: 12:02 EDT
- Elapsed time: 3:13
- Game attendance: 82,276
- Game weather: Temperature: 81 °F (27 °C) • Wind: 9 mph (14 km/h) • Weather: Partly Cloudy
- Referee: David Smith
- TV announcers (ESPN): Bob Wischusen (play-by-play), Dan Orlovsky (color), Allison Williams (sidelines)

=== Georgia ===
Week 6: #3 Georgia Bulldogs at Tennessee Volunteers

Quarter	1	2	3	4	Total
#3 Georgia	10	16	3	14	43
Tennessee	7	7	0	0	14

at Neyland Stadium, Knoxville, Tennessee

- Date: October 6, 2019
- Game time: 7:00 pm
- Game attendance: 92,709
- TV announcers (ESPN): Sean McDonough, Todd Blackledge and Holly Rowe
- Recap, Box Score

Game information

First quarter

- UGA – D'Andre Swift 1-yard run (Rodrigo Blankenship kick), 7:07. #3 Georgia 7–0. Drive: 12 plays, 84 yards, 6:51.
- TENN – Marquez Callaway 73-yard pass from Brian Maurer (Brent Cimaglia kick), 6:25. Tied 7–7. Drive: 2 plays, 75 yards, 0:42.
- UGA – Rodrigo Blankenship 50-yard field goal, 2:34. #3 Georgia 10–7. Drive: 7 plays, 43 yards, 3:51.

Second quarter

- TENN – Jauan Jennings 12-yard pass from Brian Maurer (Brent Cimaglia kick), 14:57. Tennessee 14–10. Drive: 10 plays, 75 yards, 2:37.
- UGA – Rodrigo Blankenship 34-yard field goal, 11:31. Tennessee 14–13. Drive: 8 plays, 58 yards, 3:26.
- UGA – Lawrence Cager 3-yard pass from Jake Fromm (Rodrigo Blankenship kick), 1:59. #3 Georgia 20–14. Drive: 6 plays, 60 yards, 2:03.
- UGA – George Pickens 7-yard pass from Jake Fromm (pass failed), 0:09. #3 Georgia 26–14. Drive: 5 plays, 70 yards, 0:50.

Third quarter

- UGA – Rodrigo Blankenship 27-yard field goal, 7:03. #3 Georgia 29–14. Drive: 7 plays, 44 yards, 3:34.

Fourth quarter

- UGA – Brian Herrien 1-yard run (Rodrigo Blankenship kick), 8:02. #3 Georgia 36–14. Drive: 10 plays, 75 yards, 6:04.
- UGA – Tae Crowder 60-yard fumble return (Rodrigo Blankenship kick), 4:39. #3 Georgia 43–14.

Top passers

- UGA – Jake Fromm – 24/29, 288 yards, 2 TD
- TENN – Brian Maurer – 14/28, 259 yards, 2 TD, INT

Top rushers

- UGA – Brian Herrien – 11 rushes, 88 yards, TD
- TENN – Tim Jordan – 9 rushes, 47 yards

Top receivers

- UGA – D'Andre Swift – 4 receptions, 72 yards
- TENN – Jauan Jennings – 7 receptions, 114 yards, TD

=== Mississippi State ===
Mississippi State at Tennessee

Team	1	2	3	4	Total
Mississippi State	0	3	0	7	10
• Tennessee	7	3	3	7	20

- Date: October 12
- Location: Knoxville, Tennessee
- Game start: 12:06 EDT
- Elapsed time: 2:56
- Game attendance: 85,462
- Game weather: Temperature: 56 °F (13 °C) • Wind: 7 mph (11 km/h) • Weather: Cloudy
- Referee: John McDaid
- TV announcers (SECN): Taylor Zarzour (play-by-play), Matt Stinchcomb (color) and Alyssa Lang (sidelines)

=== At Alabama ===
Tennessee at Alabama

Team	1	2	3	4	Total
Tennessee	7	3	3	0	13
• No. 1 Alabama	14	7	7	7	35

- Date: October 19
- Location: Tuscaloosa, Alabama
- Game start: 8:11 pm CDT
- Elapsed time: 3:13
- Game attendance: 101,821
- Game weather: Temperature: 61 °F (16 °C) • Wind: 6 mph (9.7 km/h) • Weather: Cloudy
- Referee: Hubert Owens
- TV announcers (ESPN): Steve Levy (play-by-play), Brian Griese (color) and Molly McGrath (sidelines)

=== South Carolina ===
South Carolina at Tennessee

Team	1	2	3	4	Total
South Carolina	7	14	0	0	21
• Tennessee	3	14	14	10	41

- Date: October 26
- Location: Knoxville, Tennessee
- Game start: 4:01 pm EDT
- Elapsed time: 3:40
- Game attendance: 87,397
- Game weather: Temperature: 75 °F (24 °C) • Wind: 5 mph (8.0 km/h) • Weather: Cloudy
- Referee: Steve Marlow
- TV announcers (SECN): Taylor Zarzour (play-by-play), Matt Stinchcomb (color) and Alyssa Lang (sidelines)

=== UAB ===
UAB at Tennessee

Team	1	2	3	4	Total
UAB	0	0	0	7	7
• Tennessee	6	17	7	0	30

- Date: November 2
- Location: Knoxville, Tennessee
- Game start: 7:02 pm EDT
- Elapsed time: 3:03
- Game attendance: 85,791
- Game weather: Temperature: 51 °F (11 °C) • Wind: 5 mph (8.0 km/h) • Weather: Partly Cloudy
- Referee: Hubert Owens
- TV announcers (ESPNU): Roy Philpott (play-by-play), Kelly Stouffer (color) and Lauren Sisler (sidelines)

=== At Kentucky ===
Tennessee at Kentucky

Team	1	2	3	4	Total
• Tennessee	0	3	14	0	17
Kentucky	13	0	0	0	13

- Date: November 9
- Location: Lexington, Kentucky
- Game start: 7:39 pm EDT
- Elapsed time: 3:15
- Game attendance: 56,760
- Game weather: Temperature: 40 °F (4 °C) • Wind: 8 mph (13 km/h) • Weather: Clear
- Referee: Ken Williamson
- TV announcers (SECN): Tom Hart (play-by-play), Jordan Rodgers (color) and Cole Cubelic (sidelines)

=== At Missouri ===
Tennessee at Missouri

Team	1	2	3	4	Total
• Tennessee	0	17	7	0	24
Missouri	3	7	7	3	20

- Date: November 23
- Location: Columbia, Missouri
- Game start: 7:39 pm EDT
- Elapsed time: 3:25
- Game attendance: 49,348
- Game weather: Temperature: 39 °F (4 °C) • Wind: 8 mph (13 km/h)
- Referee: Steve Marlowe
- TV announcers (SECN): Dave Neal (play-by-play), D. J. Shockley (color) and Dawn Davenport (sidelines)

=== Vanderbilt ===
Vanderbilt at Tennessee

Team	1	2	3	4	Total
Vanderbilt	3	0	0	7	10
• Tennessee	7	14	0	7	28

- Date: November 30
- Location: Knoxville, Tennessee
- Game start: 4:29 pm EDT
- Elapsed time: 3:46
- Game attendance: 87,367
- Game weather: Temperature: 51 °F (11 °C) • Wind: 5 mph (8.0 km/h) • Weather: Rain
- Referee: David Smith
- TV announcers (SECN): Dave Neal (play-by-play), D. J. Shockley (color) and Dawn Davenport (sidelines)

=== Indiana ===
Gator Bowl

Team	1	2	3	4	Total
Indiana	0	3	16	3	22
• Tennessee	0	6	3	14	23

- Date: January 2
- Location: Jacksonville, Florida
- Game start: 7:00 pm EDT

== Personnel ==
=== Roster and staff ===
2019 Tennessee Volunteers football team roster
Players
Coaches
Offense

Pos.	#	Name	Class
WR	1	Marquez Callaway	Sr
QB	2	Jarrett Guarantano	Jr
RB	3	Eric Gray	Fr
TE	4	Dominick Wood-Anderson	Sr
WR	5	Josh Palmer	Jr
WR	6	Deangelo Gibbs	Jr
WR	7	Brandon Johnson	Sr
RB	8	Ty Chandler	Jr
RB	9	Tim Jordan	Jr
WR	10	Tyler Byrd	Sr
WR	11	Jordan Murphy	Jr
QB	12	J. T. Shrout	Fr
WR	13	Richard Mize Jr.	So
QB	14	Spencer Smith	Fr
WR	15	Jauan Jennings	Sr
QB	17	Michael Bittner	Fr
QB	18	Brian Maurer	Fr
QB	19	Steven Orr	Fr
QB	20	Kasim Hill	So
WR	21	Jacquez Jones	So
WR	22	Isaiah Montgomery	Fr
WR	26	JT Siekerman	Fr
RB	27	Carlin Fils-aime	Sr
RB	28	James Christian	Jr
RB, LB	33	Jeremy Banks	So
RB	36	Tanner Dobrucky	So
WR	38	Grant Frerking	So
RB	40	Fred Orr	Fr
RB	42	Chip Omer	Jr
TE	44	Princeton Fant	So
RB	46	Cameron Miller	Fr
OL	50	Jackson Lampley	Fr
OL	55	Brandon Kennedy	Sr
OL	56	Riley Locklear	Jr
OL	58	Jahmir Johnson	Jr
OL	64	Wanya Morris	Fr
OL	65	Parker Ball	Fr
OL	66	Dayne Davis	Fr
OL	67	Airin Spell	Fr
OL	68	Marcus Tatum	Jr
OL	70	Ryan Johnson	Jr
OL	72	Darnell Wright	Fr
OL	73	Trey Smith	Jr
OL	74	K'Rojhn Calbert	So
OL	75	Jerome Carvin	So
OL	77	Chris Akporoghene	Fr
OL	78	Ollie Lane	Fr
OL	79	Jarious Abercrombie	Fr
WR	80	Ramel Keyton	Fr
TE	81	Austin Pope	Jr
TE	82	Jackson Lowe	Fr
TE	83	Sean Brown	Fr
WR	84	Maleik Gray	So
WR	85	Cedric Tillman	Fr
TE	86	Andrew Craig	Jr
TE	87	Jacob Warren	Fr
TE	89	Hunter Salmon	Fr

Defense

Pos.	#	Name	Class
DB	1	Trevon Flowers	So
DB	2	Alontae Taylor	So
DB	3	Bryce Thompson	So
DB	4	Warren Burrell	Fr
LB	6	JJ Peterson	Fr
DB	7	Romello Edwards	Fr
LB	8	Jordan Allen	Jr
DB	9	Garrett Johnson	So
DB	10	Jay Shoop	So
LB	11	Henry To'oTo'o	Fr
DB	12	Shawn Shamburger	So
LB	13	Deandre Johnson	Jr
DB	17	Tyus Fields	Fr
DB	18	Nigel Warrior	Sr
LB	19	Darrell Taylor	Sr
DB	20	Cheyenne Labruzza	Fr
LB	21	Shanon Reid	Jr
DB	22	Jaylen McCollough	Fr
LB	23	Will Ignont	Jr
DB	24	Aaron Beasley	Fr
DB	25	Jerrod Means	Fr
DB	26	Theo Jackson	Jr
LB	27	Quavaris Crouch	Fr
DB	28	Baylen Buchanan	Sr
DB	29	Brandon Davis	Fr
LB	30	Roman Harrison	Fr
LB	31	Nick Humphrey	Jr
DB	31	Kenney Solomon	Fr
LB	34	Deontae Beauchamp	Fr
LB	35	Daniel Bituli	Sr
DB	36	Terrell Bailey	So
LB	38	Solon Page III	So
LB	39	West Shuler	Fr
DB	41	Kenneth George Jr.	Jr
DB	43	Jake Powers	So
DB	44	Cheyenne Labruzza	So
LB	47	Landon Knoll	Sr
DL	48	Ja'Quain Blakely	Jr
DL	50	Savion Williams	Jr
DL	51	Elijah Simmons	Fr
LB	52	Bryan Aiken	Fr
DL	53	Dawson Stephens	Jr
DL	54	Kingston Harris	Fr
DL	55	Gatkek Kueth	So
LB	56	Ethan Rinke	Fr
LB	57	Nyles Gaddy	Fr
DL	79	Kurott Garland	Fr
DL	88	LaTrell Bumphus	Jr
DL	90	Greg Emerson	Fr
DL	93	Emmit Gooden (injured)	Sr
DL	94	Matthew Butler	Jr
LB	95	Kivon Bennett	So
DL	97	Darel Middleton	Jr
DL	98	Aubrey Solomon	Jr
DL	99	John Mincey	So

Special teams

Pos.	#	Name	Class
P	37	Paxton Brooks	So
PK	39	Toby Wilson	Fr
PK	42	Brent Cimaglia	Jr
PK	43	Marshall Ware	Fr
LS	46	Riley Lovingood	Jr
P	47	Joe Doyle	So
LS	59	Jake Yelich	So

Head coach

- Jeremy Pruitt – 2nd year

Coordinators/assistant coaches

- Jim Chaney (offensive coordinator) – 1st year
- Derrick Ansley (defensive coordinator/defensive backs) – 1st year
- Chris Rumph (co-defensive coordinator/outside linebackers) – 2nd year
- Kevin Sherrer (special teams coordinator/inside linebackers) – 2nd year
- Tee Martin (assistant head coach/passing game coordinator/wide receivers) – 1st year
- Will Friend (offensive line) – 2nd year
- David Johnson (running backs) – 2nd year
- Brian Niedermeyer (tight ends) – 2nd year
- Tracy Rocker (defensive line) – 2nd year
- Chris Weinke (quarterbacks) – 2nd year
- Craig Fitzgerald (director of strength and conditioning) – 2nd year

Legend

- (C) Team captain
- (S) Suspended
- (I) Ineligible
- Injured
- Redshirt

Roster

=== Current depth chart ===
Defense

FS
Nigel Warrior
Theo Jackson
Tyus Fields

JACK	MLB	WLB	SAM
Deandre Johnson; Kivon Bennett	Daniel Bituli	Henry To'oTo'o	Darrell Taylor
Roman Harrison	Quavaris Crouch	JJ Peterson	Quavaris Crouch
⋅	Solon Page	Aaron Beasley	⋅

Safety
Jaylen McCollough
Trevon Flowers
Cheyenne Labruzza

CB
Alontae Taylor
Kenneth George
Kenney Solomon

DE	NT	DE
Darel Middleton	Kurott Garland; Greg Emerson	Aubrey Solomon
Ja'Quain Blakely	Elijah Simmons	Matthew Butler
John Mincey	Kingston Harris	LaTrell Bumphus; Savion Williams

CB
Bryce Thompson
Warren Burrell
⋅

Offense

WR
Marquez Callaway
Tyler Byrd
Cedric Tillman

WR
Jauan Jennings
Brandon Johnson
Jacquez Jones

LT	LG	C	RG	RT
Wanya Morris	Trey Smith	Brandon Kennedy	Jerome Carvin	Darnell Wright
Jahmir Johnson	Riley Locklear	Jerome Carvin	Riley Locklear	K'Rojhn Calbert
Marcus Tatum	Jackson Lampley	Ryan Johnson	Chris Akporoghene	Marcus Tatum

TE
Dominick Wood-Anderson
Austin Pope
Andrew Craig

WR
Josh Palmer
Ramel Keyton
⋅

QB
Jarrett Guarantano
J. T. Shrout
Brian Maurer
⋅

Special teams
PK Brent Cimaglia
PK Paxton Brooks
P Paxton Brooks
Joe Doyle
KR Ty Chandler
Marquez Callaway
PR Marquez Callaway
LS Riley Lovingood
H Joe Doyle

RB
Ty Chandler
Eric Gray
Tim Jordan

== Rankings ==
Ranking movements Legend: ██ Increase in ranking ██ Decrease in ranking — = Not ranked RV = Received votes
	Week																
Poll	Pre	1	2	3	4	5	6	7	8	9	10	11	12	13	14	15	Final
AP	—	—	—	—	—	—	—	—	—	—	—	—	—	—	—	—	RV
Coaches	RV	—	—	—	—	—	—	—	—	—	—	—	—	—	RV	RV	RV
CFP	Not released										—	—	—	—	—	—	Not released

== Players drafted into the NFL ==
Tennessee had two players selected in the 2020 NFL Draft.

Round	Pick	Player	Position	NFL Club
2	48	Darrell Taylor	DE	Seattle Seahawks
7	217	Jauan Jennings	WR	San Francisco 49ers
