= 2020 Gator Bowl =

Postseason college football bowl game

2020 TaxSlayer Gator Bowl
- 75th Gator Bowl; Tennessee's win was vacated by the NCAA in 2023.
Indiana Hoosiers	Tennessee Volunteers
(8–4)	(7–5)
Big Ten	SEC
22	23
Head coach: Tom Allen	Head coach: Jeremy Pruitt
	1	2	3	4	Total
Indiana	0	3	16	3	22
Tennessee	0	6	3	14	23
- Date: January 2, 2020
- Season: 2019
- Stadium: TIAA Bank Field
- Location: Jacksonville, Florida
- MVP: Eric Gray (RB, Tennessee) & Peyton Ramsey (QB, Indiana)
- Favorite: Tennessee by 3.5
- National anthem: The Brown Kelly
- Referee: Mike McCabe (Pac-12)
- Halftime show: Indiana Marching Band Tennessee Marching Band
- Attendance: 61,789
- Payout: US$5,350,000

United States TV coverage
- Network: ESPN
- Announcers: Tom Hart (play-by-play), Tim Hasselbeck (analyst) and Katie George (sideline)

The 2020 Gator Bowl was a college football bowl game played on January 2, 2020, with kickoff at 7:00 p.m. EST on ESPN. It was the 75th edition of the Gator Bowl, and was one of the 2019–20 bowl games concluding the 2019 FBS football season. Sponsored by financial technology company TaxSlayer, the game was officially known as the TaxSlayer Gator Bowl.

In July 2023, the NCAA vacated Tennessee's win as part of a disciplinary action affecting the 2019 and 2020 seasons.

== Teams ==
The game matched the Indiana Hoosiers from the Big Ten Conference and the Tennessee Volunteers from the Southeastern Conference (SEC). This was the second meeting between the programs; they previously met in the January 1988 Peach Bowl, won by Tennessee, 27–22.

=== Indiana Hoosiers ===
Indiana entered the game with an 8–4 record (5–4 in conference). They finished in fourth place in the Big Ten's East Division. The Hoosiers' four losses were all to ranked opponents: Ohio State, Michigan State, Penn State, and Michigan. This was Indiana's first Gator Bowl appearance.

=== Tennessee Volunteers ===
Tennessee entered the game with a 7–5 record (5–3 in conference). They finished in third place in the SEC's East Division. The Volunteers lost to all three ranked opponents they faced: Florida, Georgia, and Alabama. After starting their season 2–5, the Volunteers entered the bowl on a five-game winning streak. This was Tennessee's seventh Gator Bowl; the Volunteers had a record of 4–2 in prior appearances.

== Game summary ==
2020 TaxSlayer Gator Bowl

Quarter	1	2	3	4	Total
Indiana	0	3	16	3	22
Tennessee	0	6	3	14	23

at TIAA Bank Field • Jacksonville, Florida

- Date: January 2, 2020
- Game time: 7:00 p.m. EST
- Game weather: Sunny • Temperature: 74 °F (23 °C) • Wind: SSE 10 mph
- Game attendance: 61,789
- Referee: Mike McCabe
- TV announcers (ESPN): Tom Hart (play-by-play), Tim Hasselbeck (analyst) and Katie George (sideline)
- ESPN game summary

Game information

First Quarter
No scoring
Second Quarter

- (14:49) TENN – Brent Cimaglia 23 yard field goal (Drive: 12 plays, 67 yards, 6:04; Tennessee 3–0)
- (5:21) TENN – Brent Cimaglia 32 yard field goal (Drive: 14 plays, 50 yards, 6:14; Tennessee 6–0)
- (0:00) IND – Logan Justus 24 yard field goal (Drive: 10 plays, 36 yards, 2:24; Tennessee 6–3)

Third Quarter

- (9:29) IND – Peyton Ramsey 1 yard rush, Logan Justus kick (Drive: 12 plays, 69 yards, 5:31; Indiana 10–6)
- (8:26) IND – Jamar Johnson 63 yard interception return, kick failed (Indiana 16–6)
- (4:11) TENN – Brent Cimaglia 43 yard field goal (Drive: 10 plays, 49 yards, 4:15; Indiana 16–9)
- (1:01) IND – Logan Justus 49 yard field goal (Drive: 8 plays, 46 yards, 3:05; Indiana 19–9)

Fourth Quarter

- (10:27) IND – Logan Justus 30 yard field goal (Drive: 7 plays, 35 yards, 3:54; Indiana 22–9)
- (4:21) TENN – Quavaris Crouch 1 yard rush, Brent Cimaglia kick (Drive: 10 plays, 82 yards, 2:45; Indiana 22–16)
- (3:51) TENN – Eric Gray 16 yard rush, Brent Cimaglia kick (Drive: 3 plays, 54 yards, 0:28; Tennessee 23–22)

=== Statistics ===
Statistics	IND	TENN
First downs	17	19
Plays–yards	65–303	69–374
Rushes–yards	31–76	35–136
Passing yards	227	238
Passing: comp–att–int	20–34–1	19–34–2
Time of possession	29:27	30:33

Team	Category	Player	Statistics
Indiana	Passing	Peyton Ramsey	20/34, 227 yards, 1 INT
Indiana	Rushing	Peyton Ramsey	17 carries, 54 yards, 1 TD
Indiana	Receiving	Peyton Hendershot	6 receptions, 67 yards
Tennessee	Passing	Jarrett Guarantano	18/31, 221 yards, 2 INT
Tennessee	Rushing	Eric Gray	14 carries, 86 yards, 1 TD
Tennessee	Receiving	Josh Palmer	6 receptions, 68 yards
