= 2019 Indiana Hoosiers football team =

American college football season

2019 Indiana Hoosiers football

Gator Bowl, L 22–23 vs. Tennessee
- Conference: Big Ten Conference
- East Division
- Record: 8–5 (5–4 Big Ten)
- Head coach: Tom Allen (3rd season)
- Offensive coordinator: Kalen DeBoer (1st season)
- Offensive scheme: Spread
- Defensive coordinator: Kane Wommack (1st season)
- Base defense: Multiple 4–2–5
- MVP: Senior class
- Captains: Coy Cronk; Reakwon Jones; Peyton Ramsey; Simon Stepaniak; Nick Westbrook-Ikhine
- Home stadium: Memorial Stadium

2019 Big Ten Conference football standings
| | Conf. | | | Overall |
| Team | W | | L | W | | L |
|---|---|---|---|---|---|---|
East Division
| No. 3 Ohio State xy$^ | 9 | – | 0 | 13 | – | 1 |
| No. 9 Penn State | 7 | – | 2 | 11 | – | 2 |
| No. 18 Michigan | 6 | – | 3 | 9 | – | 4 |
| Indiana | 5 | – | 4 | 8 | – | 5 |
| Michigan State | 4 | – | 5 | 7 | – | 6 |
| Maryland | 1 | – | 8 | 3 | – | 9 |
| Rutgers | 0 | – | 9 | 2 | – | 10 |
West Division
| No. 11 Wisconsin xy | 7 | – | 2 | 10 | – | 4 |
| No. 10 Minnesota x | 7 | – | 2 | 11 | – | 2 |
| No. 15 Iowa | 6 | – | 3 | 10 | – | 3 |
| Illinois | 4 | – | 5 | 6 | – | 7 |
| Purdue | 3 | – | 6 | 4 | – | 8 |
| Nebraska | 3 | – | 6 | 5 | – | 7 |
| Northwestern | 1 | – | 8 | 3 | – | 9 |
Championship: Ohio State 34, Wisconsin 21
^ – College Football Playoff participant; $ – Conference champion; x – Division champion/co-champions; y – Championship game participant; Rankings from AP Poll

The 2019 Indiana Hoosiers football team represented Indiana University in the 2019 NCAA Division I FBS football season. The Hoosiers played their home games at Memorial Stadium in Bloomington, Indiana, and competed as a member of the East Division of the Big Ten Conference. The team was led by third-year head coach Tom Allen.

== Spring Game ==
The 2019 Spring Game took place in Bloomington on April 12, 2019, at 7:00 p.m.

| Date | Time | Spring Game | Site | TV | Result | Source |
|---|---|---|---|---|---|---|
| April 12 | 7:00 p.m. | Offense vs. Defense | Memorial Stadium • Bloomington, IN | BTN | Offense 48–33 | |

== Offseason ==
=== Coaching changes ===
On December 27, 2018, the Hoosiers announced the promotion of Kane Wommack from Linebacker's Coach to Defensive coordinator; however, Wommack will continue linebacker coaching responsibilities. On December 30, 2018, Hoosiers' offensive coordinator Mike DeBord announced his retirement from football. On January 21, 2019, former Fresno State offensive coordinator Kalen DeBoer was announced as the Hoosiers' new offensive coordinator.

=== Departures ===
Notable departures from the 2018 squad included:

| Name | Number | Pos. | Height | Weight | Year | Hometown | Notes |
|---|---|---|---|---|---|---|---|
| J-Shun Harris II | 5 | Wide receiver | 5'8" | 172 | Senior (Redshirt) | Fishers, Indiana | Graduated |
| Luke Timian | 25 | Wide receiver | 6'0" | 195 | Senior (Redshirt) | Southlake, Texas | Graduated |

=== Transfers ===
The Hoosiers lost 2 players due to transfer:

| Name | Number | Pos. | Height | Weight | Year | Hometown | Transfer to |
|---|---|---|---|---|---|---|---|
| Craig Nelson | #26 | RB | 5'10" | 191 | Freshman (redshirt) | Miami, FL | Southern Jaguars |
| Austin Dorris | #83 | TE | 6'5" | 252 | Junior (redshirt) | Shadyside, OH | Bowling Green Falcons |

=== 2019 NFL draft ===
Hoosiers who were picked in the 2019 NFL draft:

| Round | Pick | Player | Position | Team |
|---|---|---|---|---|
| 4 | 131 | Wes Martin | Guard | Washington Redskins |
| UFA | | Jonathan Crawford | Safety | Tennessee Titans |
| UFA | | Dan Godsil | Long snapper | Tampa Bay Buccaneers |
| UFA | | Brandon Knight | Offensive lineman | Dallas Cowboys |

== Preseason ==
=== Recruits ===
The Hoosiers signed a total of 21 recruits.

College recruiting information (2019)
| Name | Hometown | School | Height | Weight | Commit date |
|---|---|---|---|---|---|
| Jordan Jakes; WR | Baltimore, Maryland | St. Frances High School | 6 ft 4 in (1.93 m) | 185 lb (84 kg) | Dec 19, 2018 |
| Jordan Jakes; WR | Recruit ratings: Scout: Rivals: 247Sports: ESPN: | | | | |
| Juan Harris; DT | Chicago, Illinois | Independence Community College | 6 ft 3 in (1.91 m) | 350 lb (160 kg) | Dec 19, 2018 |
| Juan Harris; DT | Recruit ratings: Scout: Rivals: 247Sports: ESPN: | | | | |
| Antoine Whitner; DT | Bradenton, Florida | IMG Academy | 6 ft 5 in (1.96 m) | 295 lb (134 kg) | Dec 19, 2018 |
| Antoine Whitner; DT | Recruit ratings: Scout: Rivals: 247Sports: ESPN: | | | | |
| Cameron Williams; LB | Merrillville, Indiana | Andrean High School | 6 ft 3 in (1.91 m) | 205 lb (93 kg) | Dec 19, 2018 |
| Cameron Williams; LB | Recruit ratings: Scout: Rivals: 247Sports: ESPN: | | | | |
| Da'Shaun Brown; ATH | Racine, Wisconsin | St. Catherine's | 6 ft 1 in (1.85 m) | 185 lb (84 kg) | Dec 3, 2018 |
| Da'Shaun Brown; ATH | Recruit ratings: Scout: Rivals: 247Sports: ESPN: | | | | |
| David Ellis; WR | Clinton Township, Michigan | Chippewa Valley High School | 6 ft 0 in (1.83 m) | 190 lb (86 kg) | Oct 9, 2018 |
| David Ellis; WR | Recruit ratings: Scout: Rivals: 247Sports: ESPN: | | | | |
| Sampson James; RB | Avon, Indiana | Avon High School | 6 ft 1 in (1.85 m) | 205 lb (93 kg) | Oct 7, 2018 |
| Sampson James; RB | Recruit ratings: Scout: Rivals: 247Sports: ESPN: | | | | |
| Tiawan Mullen; DB | Coconut Creek, Florida | Coconut Creek High School | 5 ft 10 in (1.78 m) | 155 lb (70 kg) | Oct 7, 2018 |
| Tiawan Mullen; DB | Recruit ratings: Scout: Rivals: 247Sports: ESPN: | | | | |
| Sio Nofoagatoto'a; DT | 'Ili'ili, Tutuila | Clearwater Academy International | 6 ft 2 in (1.88 m) | 312 lb (142 kg) | Jun 30, 2018 |
| Sio Nofoagatoto'a; DT | Recruit ratings: Scout: Rivals: 247Sports: ESPN: | | | | |
| Sean Wratcher; LS | Cleveland, Ohio | St. Ignatius High School | 6 ft 4 in (1.93 m) | 195 lb (88 kg) | Jun 19, 2018 |
| Sean Wratcher; LS | Recruit ratings: Scout: Rivals: 247Sports: ESPN: | | | | |
| Gary Cooper; TE | Miami, Florida | Columbus High School | 6 ft 3 in (1.91 m) | 230 lb (100 kg) | Jun 19, 2018 |
| Gary Cooper; TE | Recruit ratings: Scout: Rivals: 247Sports: ESPN: | | | | |
| Kervens Bonhomme; LB | Ottawa, Ontario | Clearwater Academy International | 6 ft 2 in (1.88 m) | 230 lb (100 kg) | Jun 19, 2018 |
| Kervens Bonhomme; LB | Recruit ratings: Scout: Rivals: 247Sports: ESPN: | | | | |
| CJ Person; DT | Montgomery, Alabama | Montgomery Catholic Preparatory School | 6 ft 2 in (1.88 m) | 299 lb (136 kg) | Jun 18, 2018 |
| CJ Person; DT | Recruit ratings: Scout: Rivals: 247Sports: ESPN: | | | | |
| Michael Katic; OL | Gibsonia, Pennsylvania | Pine-Richland High School | 6 ft 3 in (1.91 m) | 270 lb (120 kg) | Jun 17, 2018 |
| Michael Katic; OL | Recruit ratings: Scout: Rivals: 247Sports: ESPN: | | | | |
| Larry Tracy; DB | Indianapolis, Indiana | Decatur Central High School | 5 ft 11 in (1.80 m) | 175 lb (79 kg) | Jun 17, 2018 |
| Larry Tracy; DB | Recruit ratings: Scout: Rivals: 247Sports: ESPN: | | | | |
| Matthew Bedford; OL | Memphis, Tennessee | Cordova High School | 6 ft 6 in (1.98 m) | 260 lb (120 kg) | Jun 16, 2018 |
| Matthew Bedford; OL | Recruit ratings: Scout: Rivals: 247Sports: ESPN: | | | | |
| Jeramy Passmore; DT | Miami, Florida | Columbus High School | 6 ft 2 in (1.88 m) | 250 lb (110 kg) | Jun 15, 2018 |
| Jeramy Passmore; DT | Recruit ratings: Scout: Rivals: 247Sports: ESPN: | | | | |
| Beau Robbins; DE | Carmel, Indiana | Carmel High School | 6 ft 5 in (1.96 m) | 240 lb (110 kg) | Jun 1, 2018 |
| Beau Robbins; DE | Recruit ratings: Scout: Rivals: 247Sports: ESPN: | | | | |
| Ivory Winters; RB | Hayti, Missouri | Hayti High School | 6 ft 1 in (1.85 m) | 210 lb (95 kg) | Apr 20, 2018 |
| Ivory Winters; RB | Recruit ratings: Scout: Rivals: 247Sports: ESPN: | | | | |
| Josh Sanguinetti; DB | Lauderdale Lakes, Florida | NSU University School | 6 ft 1 in (1.85 m) | 178 lb (81 kg) | Feb 6, 2019 |
| Josh Sanguinetti; DB | Recruit ratings: Scout: Rivals: 247Sports: ESPN: | | | | |
| Tim Weaver; OL | Hellertown, Pennsylvania | Saucon Valley High School | 6 ft 5 in (1.96 m) | 285 lb (129 kg) | Feb 6, 2019 |
| Tim Weaver; OL | Recruit ratings: Scout: Rivals: 247Sports: | | | | |
Overall recruit ranking: Rivals: 37 247Sports: 38 ESPN: 38
Note: In many cases, Scout, Rivals, 247Sports, On3, and ESPN may conflict in their listings of height and weight.; In these cases, the average was taken. ESPN grades are on a 100-point scale.; Sources: "Indiana Football Commitments". Rivals.; "2019 Team Ranking". Rivals.com.

=== Returning starters ===
==== Offense ====
| Player | Class | Position | 2018 | Career |
|---|---|---|---|---|
| Michael Penix Jr. | Freshman (redshirt) | Quarterback | 3 games | 3 games |
| Stevie Scott | Sophomore | Running back | 11 games | 11 games |
| Cole Gest | Junior (redshirt) | Running back | 1 game | 2 games |
| Nick Westbrook-Ikhine | Senior (redshirt) | Wide receiver | 12 games | 24 games |
| Whop Philyor | Junior | Wide receiver | 5 games | 5 games |
| Donavan Hale | Senior (redshirt) | Wide receiver | 8 games | 10 games |
| Ty Fryfogle | Junior | Wide receiver | 3 games | 3 games |
| Peyton Hendershot | Sophomore (redshirt) | Tight end | 10 games | 10 games |
| Coy Cronk | Senior | Offensive line | 11 games | 36 games |
| Hunter Littlejohn | Senior (redshirt) | Offensive line | 4 games | 16 games |
| Simon Stepaniak | Senior (redshirt) | Offensive line | 12 games | 20 games |

==== Defense ====
| Player | Class | Position | 2018 | Career |
|---|---|---|---|---|
| Allen Stallings | Senior | Defensive line | 0 games | 1 game |
| Brandon Wilson | Senior (redshirt) | Defensive line | 1 game | 2 games |
| Gavin Everett | Senior (redshirt) | Defensive line | 11 games | 11 games |
| Reakwon Jones | Senior (redshirt) | Defensive back | 10 games | 10 games |
| James Miller | Sophomore | Defensive back | 1 game | 1 game |
| Marcelino McCrary-Ball | Junior (redshirt) | Defensive back | 11 games | 26 games |
| A'Shon Riggins | Senior | Defensive back | 5 games | 16 games |
| Andre Brown Jr. | Senior (redshirt) | Defensive back | 12 games | 29 games |
| Raheem Layne | Junior | Defensive back | 7 games | 8 games |
| Khalil Bryant | Senior | Defensive back | 9 games | 9 games |
| Bryant Fitzgerald | Sophomore (redshirt) | Defensive back | 4 games | 4 games |

==== Special teams ====
| Player | Class | Position | 2018 | Career |
|---|---|---|---|---|
| Logan Justus | Senior (redshirt) | Kicker | 12 games | 12 games |
| Nathanael Snyder | Junior (redshirt) | Kicker | 0 games | 0 games |
| Haydon Whitehead | Senior (redshirt) | Punter | 12 games | 24 games |
| | Redshirt | Punter | games | games |

=== Preseason Big Ten poll ===
Although the Big Ten Conference has not held an official preseason poll since 2010, Cleveland.com has polled sports journalists representing all member schools as a de facto preseason media poll since 2011. For the 2019 poll, Indiana was projected to finish in fifth in the East Division.

== Schedule ==
The Hoosiers' 2019 schedule consisted of 6 home games, 5 away games and 1 neutral site game in Indianapolis, Indiana. The Hoosiers' first non-conference game was at Lucas Oil Stadium, in Indianapolis, against Ball State of the Mid-American Conference (MAC), before hosting the remaining two non-conference games; against Eastern Illinois from the Ohio Valley Conference (OVC) and against UConn of the American Athletic Conference (AAC).

The Hoosiers were scheduled to play nine conference games; they hosted Ohio State, Rutgers, Northwestern and Michigan. They traveled to Michigan State, Maryland, Nebraska, Penn State and Purdue.

| Date | Time | Opponent | Site | TV | Result | Attendance |
|---|---|---|---|---|---|---|
| August 31, 2019 | 12:00 p.m. | vs. Ball State* | Lucas Oil Stadium; Indianapolis, IN | CBSSN | W 34–24 | 21,437 |
| September 7 | 3:30 p.m. | (FCS) Eastern Illinois* | Memorial Stadium; Bloomington, IN | BTN | W 52–0 | 37,784 |
| September 14 | 12:00 p.m. | No. 6 Ohio State | Memorial Stadium; Bloomington, IN | FOX | L 10–51 | 47,945 |
| September 21 | 12:00 p.m. | UConn* | Memorial Stadium; Bloomington, IN | BTN | W 38–3 | 40,084 |
| September 28 | 3:30 p.m. | at No. 25 Michigan State | Spartan Stadium; East Lansing, MI (rivalry) | BTN | L 31–40 | 71,048 |
| October 12 | 12:00 p.m. | Rutgers^{†} | Memorial Stadium; Bloomington, IN | BTN | W 35–0 | 37,055 |
| October 19 | 3:30 p.m. | at Maryland | Maryland Stadium; College Park, MD | BTN | W 34–28 | 32,606 |
| October 26 | 3:30 p.m. | at Nebraska | Memorial Stadium; Lincoln, NE | BTN | W 38–31 | 89,317 |
| November 2 | 7:00 p.m. | Northwestern | Memorial Stadium; Bloomington, IN | FS1 | W 34–3 | 40,924 |
| November 16 | 12:00 p.m. | at No. 9 Penn State | Beaver Stadium; University Park, PA | ABC | L 27–34 | 106,323 |
| November 23 | 3:30 p.m. | No. 13 Michigan | Memorial Stadium; Bloomington, IN | ESPN | L 14–39 | 43,671 |
| November 30 | 12:00 p.m. | at Purdue | Ross-Ade Stadium; West Lafayette, IN (Old Oaken Bucket) | ESPN2 | W 44–41 ^{2OT} | 55,338 |
| January 2, 2020 | 7:00 p.m. | vs. Tennessee* | TIAA Bank Field; Jacksonville, FL (Gator Bowl) | ESPN | L 22–23 | 61,789 |
*Non-conference game; ^{†}Homecoming; Rankings from AP Poll and CFP Rankings (after November 5) released prior to game; All times are in Eastern time

== Rankings ==
Ranking movements Legend: ██ Increase in ranking ██ Decrease in ranking — = Not ranked RV = Received votes
| | Week | | | | | | | | | | | | | | | | |
| Poll | Pre | 1 | 2 | 3 | 4 | 5 | 6 | 7 | 8 | 9 | 10 | 11 | 12 | 13 | 14 | 15 | Final |
|---|---|---|---|---|---|---|---|---|---|---|---|---|---|---|---|---|---|
| AP | — | — | — | — | — | — | — | — | — | RV | RV | 24 | RV | RV | — | — | |
| Coaches | — | — | — | — | — | — | — | — | RV | RV | RV | 25 | RV | RV | RV | RV | |
| CFP | Not released | | | | | | | | | | — | — | — | — | — | — | Not released |

== Game summaries ==
=== vs Ball State ===
Ball State Cardinals (0–0) vs Indiana Hoosiers (0–0) – Game summary

| Quarter | 1 | 2 | 3 | 4 | Total |
|---|---|---|---|---|---|
| Hoosiers | 10 | 6 | 7 | 11 | 34 |
| Cardinals | 3 | 7 | 7 | 7 | 24 |

at Lucas Oil Stadium • Indianapolis, Indiana

- Date: August 31, 2019
- Game time: 12:00 p.m.
- Game weather: Indoors
- Game attendance: 21,437
- Referee: Tim O'Dey
- TV announcers (CBS): Jason Horowitz (play-by-play), Danny Kanell (analyst)
- Sources: IUHoosiers.com

Game information

First quarter

- (9:44) IU – Logan Justus 48-yard field goal (Drive: 10 plays, 60 yards, 3:29; Indiana 3–0)
- (3:30) BALL – Ryan Rimmler 22-yard field goal (Drive: 13 plays, 70 yards, 6:14; Tied 3–3)
- (2:41) IU – Nick Westbrook-Ikhine 75-yard pass from Michael Penix Jr., Logan Justus kick (Drive: 2 plays, 78 yards, 0:42; Indiana 10–3)

Second quarter

- (13:58) BALL – Caleb Huntley 1-yard run, Ryan Rimmler kick (Drive: 5 plays, 45 yards, 1:31; Tied 10–10)
- (3:12) IU – Logan Justus 30-yard field goal (Drive: 11 plays, 57 yards, 3:21; Indiana 13–10)
- (0:01) IU – Logan Justus 49-yard field goal (Drive: 9 plays, 59 yards, 1:10; Indiana 16–10)

Third quarter

- (11:53) IU – Stevie Scott III 4-yard run, Logan Justus kick (Drive: 7 plays, 63 yards, 2:54; Indiana 23–10)
- (8:34) BALL – Walter Fletcher 45-yard pass from Drew Plitt, Logan Justus kick (Drive: 7 plays, 65 yards, 3:19; Indiana 23–17)

Fourth quarter

- (13:47) IU – Stevie Scott III 2-yard run, Michael Penix Jr. two-point pass to Peyton Hendershot (Drive: 8 plays, 65 yards, 2:20; Indiana 31–17)
- (6:28) BALL – Yo'Heinz Tyler 36-yard pass from Drew Plitt, Ryan Rimmler kick (Drive: 8 plays, 93 yards, 2:25; Indiana 31–24)
- (2:15) IU – Logan Justus 50-yard field goal (Drive: 7 plays, 38 yards, 4:05; Indiana 34–24)

| Statistics | BALL | IU |
|---|---|---|
| First downs | 25 | 26 |
| Total yards | 474 | 398 |
| Rushes/yards | 33–148 | 40–100 |
| Passing yards | 326 | 298 |
| Passing: Comp–Att–Int | 24–41–2 | 26–41–1 |
| Time of possession | 29:01 | 30:59 |

| Team | Category | Player | Statistics |
|---|---|---|---|
| Ball State | Passing | Drew Plitt | 26/41, 298 yards, 2 TD, INT |
| Ball State | Rushing | Caleb Huntley | 22 carries, 81 yards, TD |
| Ball State | Receiving | Yo'Heinz Tyler | 3 receptions, 71 yards, TD |
| Indiana | Passing | Michael Penix Jr. | 24/40, 326 yards, TD, 2 INT |
| Indiana | Rushing | Michael Penix Jr. | 7 carries, 67 yards |
| Indiana | Receiving | Nick Westbrook-Ikhine | 3 receptions, 103 yards, TD |

=== vs Eastern Illinois (FCS) ===
Eastern Illinois Panthers (0–1) vs Indiana Hoosiers (1–0) – Game summary

| Quarter | 1 | 2 | 3 | 4 | Total |
|---|---|---|---|---|---|
| Panthers | 0 | 0 | 0 | 0 | 0 |
| Hoosiers | 21 | 14 | 7 | 10 | 52 |

at Memorial Stadium • Bloomington, Indiana

- Date: September 7, 2019
- Game time: 3:30 p.m.
- Game weather: Partly cloudy, 72 °F (22 °C)
- Game attendance: 37,784
- Referee: Larry Smith
- TV announcers (BTN): Joe Beninati (play-by-play), Chuck Long (analyst)
- Sources: IUHoosiers.com

Game information

First quarter

- (11:05) IU – Miles Marshall 10-yard pass from Michael Penix Jr., Logan Justus kick (Drive: 10 plays, 59 yards, 3:55; Indiana 7–0)
- (4:28) IU – Stevie Scott III 5-yard run, Logan Justus kick (Drive: 9 plays, 68 yards, 4:18; Indiana 14–0)
- (1:34) IU – Cole Gest 3-yard run (Drive: 2 plays, 32 yards, 0:29; Indiana 21–0)

Second quarter

- (1:44) IU – Peyton Hendershot 8-yard pass from Michael Penix Jr., Logan Justus kick (Drive: 10 plays, 80 yards, 4:41; Indiana 28–0)
- (1:07) IU – Ronnie Walker 64-yard pass from Peyton Ramsey, Logan Justus kick (Drive: 1 play, 64 yards, 8:33; Indiana 35–0)

Third quarter

- (7:19) IU – Donovan Hale 43-yard pass from Peyton Ramsey, Logan Justus kick (Drive: 6 plays, 96 yards, 3:07; Indiana 42–0)

Fourth quarter

- (13:28) IU – Sampson James 1-yard run, Logan Justus kick (Drive: 7 plays, 55 yards, 2:37; Indiana 49–0)
- (11:54) IU – Charles Campbell 48-yard field goal (Drive: 4 plays, 1 yard, 0:45; Indiana 52–0)

| Statistics | EIU | IU |
|---|---|---|
| First downs | 5 | 26 |
| Total yards | 116 | 555 |
| Rushes/yards | 31–52 | 34–114 |
| Passing yards | 64 | 441 |
| Passing: Comp–Att–Int | 11–25–0 | 30–41–0 |
| Time of possession | 27:25 | 32:35 |

| Team | Category | Player | Statistics |
|---|---|---|---|
| Eastern Illinois | Passing | Johnathan Brantley | 8/17, 49 yards |
| Eastern Illinois | Rushing | Darshon McCullough | 6 carries, 17 yards |
| Eastern Illinois | Receiving | James Sheehan | 2 receptions, 18 yards |
| Indiana | Passing | Peyton Ramsey | 13/14, 226 yards, 2 TD |
| Indiana | Rushing | Stevie Scott III | 12 carries, 61 yards, TD |
| Indiana | Receiving | Donavan Hale | 5 receptions, 110 yards, TD |

=== vs No. 6 Ohio State ===
No. 6 Ohio State Buckeyes (2–0) vs Indiana Hoosiers (2–0) – Game summary

| Quarter | 1 | 2 | 3 | 4 | Total |
|---|---|---|---|---|---|
| No. 6 Buckeyes | 7 | 23 | 21 | 0 | 51 |
| Hoosiers | 3 | 7 | 0 | 0 | 10 |

at Memorial Stadium • Bloomington, Indiana

- Date: September 14, 2019
- Game time: 12:00 p.m.
- Game weather: Sunny, 79 °F (26 °C)
- Game attendance: 47,945
- Referee: Jerry McGinn
- TV announcers (FOX): Gus Johnson (play-by-play), Joel Klatt (analyst), Jenny Taft (sideline)
- Sources: IUHoosiers.com

Game information

First quarter

- (7:28) OSU – Justin Fields 3-yard run, Blake Haubeil kick (Drive: 9 plays, 68 yards, 2:56; Ohio State 7–0)
- (3:45) IU – Logan Justus 29-yard field goal (Drive: 9 plays, 59 yards, 3:43; Ohio State 7–3)

Second quarter

- (11:26) OSU – Chris Olave 37-yard pass from Justin Fields, Blake Haubeil kick (Drive: 6 plays, 63 yards, 2:24; Ohio State 14–3)
- (10:15) OSU – Team safety (Drive: 3 plays, -5 yards, 1:11; Ohio State 16–3)
- (8:30) OSU – K. J. Hill 9-yard pass from Justin Fields, Blake Haubeil kick (Drive: 5 plays, 75 yards, 1:45; Ohio State 23–3)
- (4:09) OSU – J. K. Dobbins 26-yard run, Blake Haubeil kick (Drive: 5 plays, 58 yards, 1:53; Ohio State 30–3)
- (1:07) IU – Peyton Hendershot 49-yard pass from Donavan Hale, Blake Haubeil kick (Drive: 8 plays, 78 yards, 3:02; Indiana 30–10)

Third quarter

- (12:15) OSU – J. K. Dobbins 4-yard from Justin Fields, Blake Haubeil kick (Drive: 7 plays, 75 yards, 2:45; Ohio State 37–10)
- (4:58) OSU – Master Teague 40-yard run, Blake Haubeil kick (Drive: 9 plays, 97 yards, 3:30; Ohio State 44–10)
- (0:00) OSU – Damon Arnette 96-yard interception return, Blake Haubeil kick (Drive: 12 plays, 68 yards, 4:57; Ohio State 51–10)

Fourth quarter

None

| Statistics | OSU | IU |
|---|---|---|
| First downs | 30 | 15 |
| Total yards | 520 | 257 |
| Rushes/yards | 42–306 | 31–42 |
| Passing yards | 214 | 215 |
| Passing: Comp–Att–Int | 17–29–0 | 21–36–1 |
| Time of possession | 27:50 | 32:10 |

| Team | Category | Player | Statistics |
|---|---|---|---|
| Ohio State | Passing | Justin Fields | 14/24, 199 yards, 3 TD |
| Ohio State | Rushing | J. K. Dobbins | 22 carries, 193 yards, TD |
| Ohio State | Receiving | Chris Olave | 3 receptions, 70 yards, TD |
| Indiana | Passing | Peyton Ramsey | 19/33, 162 yards, INT |
| Indiana | Rushing | Peyton Ramsey | 14 carries, 14 yards |
| Indiana | Receiving | Peyton Hendershot | 4 receptions, 70 yards, TD |

=== vs UConn ===
UConn Huskies (0–2) vs Indiana Hoosiers (2–1) – Game summary

| Quarter | 1 | 2 | 3 | 4 | Total |
|---|---|---|---|---|---|
| Huskies | 3 | 0 | 0 | 0 | 3 |
| Hoosiers | 7 | 10 | 14 | 7 | 38 |

at Memorial Stadium • Bloomington, Indiana

- Date: September 21, 2019
- Game time: 12:00 p.m.
- Game weather: Cloudy • Temperature: 82 °F (28 °C) • Wind: 8 SSW
- Game attendance: 40,084
- Referee: Daniel Capron
- TV announcers (BTN): Lisa Byington (play-by-play), Jeremy Leman (analyst)
- Sources: IUHoosiers.com

Game information

First quarter

- (11:24) CONN – Clayton Harris 41-yard field goal (Drive: 7 plays, 7 yards, 2:11; Connecticut 3–0)
- (5:01) IU – Whop Philyor 12-yard pass from Peyton Ramsey, Logan Justus kick (Drive: 12 plays, 75 yards, 6:23; Indiana 7–3)

Second quarter

- (13:35) IU – Logan Justus 27-yard field goal (Drive: 10 plays, 62 yards, 4:59; Indiana 10–3)
- (1:42) IU – Peyton Hendershot 4-yard pass from Peyton Ramsey, Logan Justus kick (Drive: 9 plays, 68 yards, 4:02; Indiana 17–3)

Third quarter

- (12:50) IU – Cam Jones 44-yard interception return, Logan Justus kick (Drive: 5 plays, 23 yards, 2:10; Indiana 24–3)
- (4:37) IU – Nick Westbrook-Ikhine 16-yard pass from Peyton Ramsey, Logan Justus kick (Drive: 10 plays, 90 yards, 5:04; Indiana 31–3)

Fourth quarter

- (8:47) IU – Stevie Scott III 6-yard run, Logan Justus kick (Drive: 8 plays, 70 yards, 4:09; Indiana 38–3)

| Statistics | CONN | IU |
|---|---|---|
| First downs | 9 | 25 |
| Total yards | 145 | 430 |
| Rushes/yards | 22–51 | 40–178 |
| Passing yards | 94 | 252 |
| Passing: Comp–Att–Int | 15–30–1 | 24–28–1 |
| Time of possession | 24:08 | 35:52 |

| Team | Category | Player | Statistics |
|---|---|---|---|
| Connecticut | Passing | Jack Zergiotis | 14/28, 90 yards, INT |
| Connecticut | Rushing | Kevin Mensah | 10 carries, 34 yards |
| Connecticut | Receiving | Cameron Ross | 3 receptions, 30 yards |
| Indiana | Passing | Peyton Ramsey | 23/27, 247 yards, 3 TD, INT |
| Indiana | Rushing | Stevie Scott III | 21 carries, 97 yards, TD |
| Indiana | Receiving | Ty Fryfogle | 5 receptions, 47 yards |

=== At No. 25 Michigan State ===
Indiana Hoosiers (3–1) at No. 25 Michigan State Spartans (3–1) – Game summary

| Quarter | 1 | 2 | 3 | 4 | Total |
|---|---|---|---|---|---|
| Hoosiers | 7 | 7 | 3 | 14 | 31 |
| No. 25 Spartans | 7 | 14 | 0 | 19 | 40 |

at Spartan Stadium • East Lansing, Michigan

- Date: September 28, 2019
- Game time: 3:40 p.m.
- Game weather: Cloudy, 64 °F (18 °C)
- Game attendance: 71,048
- Referee: Mike Cannon
- TV announcers (BTN): Brandon Gaudin (play-by-play), James Laurinaitis (analyst)
- Sources: IUHoosiers.com

Game information

First quarter

- (8:04) MSU – Elijah Collins 4-yard run, Matt Coghlin kick (Drive: 6 plays, 71 yards, 2:11; Michigan State 7–0)
- (1:35) IU – Whop Philyor 28-yard pass from Michael Penix Jr., Logan Justus kick (Drive: 6 plays, 6 yards, 2:04; Tied 7–7)

Second quarter

- (12:55) MSU – Darrell Stewart 5-yard pass from Brian Lewerke, Matt Coghlin kick (Drive: 10 plays, 75 yards, 3:40; Michigan State 14–7)
- (4:07) IU – Michael Penix Jr. 2-yard run, Logan Justus kick (Drive: 10 plays, 80 yards, 5:38; Tied 14–14)
- (0:33) MSU – Darrell Stewart 26-yard pass from Brian Lewerke, Matt Coghlin kick (Drive: 5 plays, 56 yards, 0:46; Michigan State 21–14)

Third quarter

- (8:23) IU – Logan Justus 26-yard field goal (Drive: 12 plays, 81 yards, 6:32; Michigan State 21–17)

Fourth quarter

- (14:52) IU – Donovan Hale 12-yard pass from Michael Penix Jr., Logan Justus kick (Drive: 13 plays, 80 yards, 6:36; Indiana 24–21)
- (12:12) MSU – Matt Seybert 10-yard pass from Brian Lewerke, Matt Coghlin kick (Drive: 2 plays, 26 yards, 0:30; Michigan State 28–24)
- (3:33) MSU – Matt Coghlin 44-yard field goal (Drive: 13 plays, 64 yards, 6:25; Michigan State 31–24)
- (2:00) IU – Whop Philyor 11-yard pass from Michael Penix Jr., Logan Justus kick (Drive: 6 plays, 78 yards, 1:27; Tied 31–31)
- (0:05) MSU – Matt Coghlin 21-yard field goal (Drive: 5 plays, 72 yards, 1:55; Michigan State 34–31)
- (0:00) MSU – Michael Dowell 0-yard fumble recovery (Drive: 1 play, -25 yards, 0:05; Michigan State 40–31)

| Statistics | IU | MSU |
|---|---|---|
| First downs | 26 | 23 |
| Total yards | 356 | 442 |
| Rushes/yards | 28–70 | 34–142 |
| Passing yards | 286 | 300 |
| Passing: Comp–Att–Int | 33–42–0 | 18–36–0 |
| Time of possession | 34:20 | 25:40 |

| Team | Category | Player | Statistics |
|---|---|---|---|
| Indiana | Passing | Michael Penix Jr. | 33/42, 286 yards, 3 TD |
| Indiana | Rushing | Stevie Scott III | 18 carries, 66 yards |
| Indiana | Receiving | Whop Philyor | 14 receptions, 142 yards, 2 TD |
| Michigan State | Passing | Brian Lewerke | 18/36, 300 yards, 2 TD |
| Michigan State | Rushing | Brian Lewerke | 12 carries, 78 yards |
| Michigan State | Receiving | Darrell Stewart Jr. | 5 receptions, 117 yards, 2 TD |

=== vs Rutgers ===
Rutgers Scarlet Knights (1–4) vs Indiana Hoosiers (3–2) – Game summary

| Quarter | 1 | 2 | 3 | 4 | Total |
|---|---|---|---|---|---|
| Scarlet Knights | 0 | 0 | 0 | 0 | 0 |
| Hoosiers | 21 | 0 | 14 | 0 | 35 |

at Memorial Stadium • Bloomington, Indiana

- Date: October 12, 2019
- Game time: 12:00 p.m.
- Game weather: Sunny, 50 °F (10 °C)
- Game attendance: 37,055
- Referee: Mark Kluczynski
- TV announcers (BTN): Lisa Byington (play-by-play), Jeremy Leman (analyst)
- Sources: IUHoosiers.com

Game information

First quarter

- (14:50) IU – Raekwon Jones 17-yard fumble return, Logan Justus kick (Drive: 1 play, -8 yards, 0:10; Indiana 7–0)
- (12:14) IU – Peyton Hendershot 14-yard pass from Michael Penix Jr., Logan Justus kick (Drive: 2 plays, 70 yards, 0:47; Indiana 14–0)
- (8:08) IU – Nick Westbrook-Ikhine 19-yard pass from Michael Penix Jr., Logan Justus kick (Drive: 5 plays, 59 yards, 2:43; Indiana 21–0)

Second quarter

None

Third quarter

- (12:55) IU – Ty Fryfogle 10-yard pass from Michael Penix Jr., Logan Justus kick (Drive: 4 plays, 71 yards, 2:05; Indiana 28–0)
- (4:02) IU – Sampson James 1-yard run, Logan Justus kick (Drive: 13 plays, 28 yards, 7:07; Indiana 35–0)

Fourth quarter

None

| Statistics | RUTG | IU |
|---|---|---|
| First downs | 6 | 25 |
| Total yards | 75 | 557 |
| Rushes/yards | 33–74 | 38–260 |
| Passing yards | 1 | 297 |
| Passing: Comp–Att–Int | 5–13–0 | 24–35–1 |
| Time of possession | 23:42 | 36:18 |

| Team | Category | Player | Statistics |
|---|---|---|---|
| Rutgers | Passing | Johnny Langan | 5/13, 1 yard |
| Rutgers | Rushing | Isiah Pacheco | 14 carries, 44 yards |
| Rutgers | Receiving | Aaron Young | 3 receptions, 4 yards |
| Indiana | Passing | Michael Penix Jr. | 20/39, 282 yards, 3 TD, INT |
| Indiana | Rushing | Stevie Scott III | 12 carries, 164 yards |
| Indiana | Receiving | Whop Philyor | 10 receptions, 182 yards |

=== At Maryland ===
Indiana Hoosiers (4–2) at Maryland Terrapins (3–3) – Game summary

| Quarter | 1 | 2 | 3 | 4 | Total |
|---|---|---|---|---|---|
| Hoosiers | 14 | 10 | 7 | 3 | 34 |
| Terrapins | 7 | 14 | 7 | 0 | 28 |

at Maryland Stadium • College Park, Maryland

- Date: October 19, 2019
- Game time: 3:40 p.m.
- Game weather: Partly cloudy, 63 °F (17 °C)
- Game attendance: 32,606
- Referee: John O'Neill
- TV announcers (BTN): Mike Monaco (play-by-play), Stanley Jackson (analyst)
- Sources: IUHoosiers.com

Game information

First quarter

- (13:03) IU – Donavan Hale 28-yard pass from Michael Penix Jr., Logan Justus kick (Drive: 5 plays, 69 yards, 1:57; Indiana 7–0)
- (9:41) MARY – Chig Okonkwo 11-yard pass from Tyrrell Pigrome, Joseph Petrino kick (Drive: 8 plays, 75 yards, 3:22; Tied 7–7)
- (6:31) IU – Stevie Scott III 3-yard run, Logan Justus kick (Drive: 8 plays, 75 yards, 3:10; Indiana 14–7)

Second quarter

- (12:05) MARY – Javon Leake 60-yard run, Joseph Petrino kick (Drive: 4 plays, 80 yards, 1:16; Tied 14–14)
- (7:36) IU – Logan Justus 20-yard field goal (Drive: 12 plays, 69 yards, 4:29; Indiana 17–14)
- (4:09) MARY – Dontay Demus Jr. 15-yard pass from Tyrrell Pigrome, Joseph Petrino kick (Drive: 7 plays, 75 yards, 3:27; Maryland 21–17)
- (0:24) IU – Nick Westbrook-Ikhine 26-yard pass from Peyton Ramsey, Logan Justus kick (Drive: 8 plays, 63 yards, 3:45; Indiana 24–21)

Third quarter

- (2:32) IU – Stevie Scott III 9-yard run, Logan Justus kick (Drive: 5 plays, 62 yards, 2:17; Indiana 31–21)
- (0:01) MARY – Javon Leake 1-yard run, Joseph Petrino kick (Drive: 6 plays, 81 yards, 2:31; Indiana 31–28)

Fourth quarter

- (2:49) IU – Logan Justus 34-yard field goal (Drive: 4 plays, -9 yards, 0:53; Indiana 34–28)

| Statistics | IU | MARY |
|---|---|---|
| First downs | 28 | 21 |
| Total yards | 520 | 383 |
| Rushes/yards | 32–186 | 37–173 |
| Passing yards | 334 | 210 |
| Passing: Comp–Att–Int | 29–41–1 | 17–27–1 |
| Time of possession | 35:33 | 24:27 |

| Team | Category | Player | Statistics |
|---|---|---|---|
| Indiana | Passing | Peyton Ramsey | 20/27, 193 yards, TD |
| Indiana | Rushing | Stevie Scott III | 18 carries, 108 yards, 2 TD |
| Indiana | Receiving | Peyton Hendershot | 6 receptions, 95 yards |
| Maryland | Passing | Tyrrell Pigrome | 17/27, 210 yards, 2 TD, INT |
| Maryland | Rushing | Javon Leake | 23 carries, 158 yards, 2 TD |
| Maryland | Receiving | Dontay Demus Jr. | 5 receptions, 82 yards, TD |

=== At Nebraska ===
Indiana Hoosiers (5–2) at Nebraska Cornhuskers (4–3) – Game summary

| Quarter | 1 | 2 | 3 | 4 | Total |
|---|---|---|---|---|---|
| Hoosiers | 9 | 7 | 15 | 7 | 38 |
| Cornhuskers | 14 | 7 | 3 | 7 | 31 |

at Memorial Stadium • Lincoln, Nebraska

- Date: October 26, 2019
- Game time: 2:30 p.m. CST
- Game weather: Sunny, 57 °F (14 °C)
- Game attendance: 89,317
- Referee: Ron Snodgrass
- TV announcers (BTN): Brandon Gaudin (play-by-play), James Laurinaitis (analyst)
- Sources: IUHoosiers.com

Game information

First quarter

- (13:32) NEB – Noah Vedral 4-yard run, Barret Pickering kick (Drive: 5 plays, 75 yards, 1:28; Nebraska 7–0)
- (8:45) IU – Logan Justus 22-yard field goal (Drive: 11 plays, 71 yards, 4:42; Nebraska 7–3)
- (6:57) NEB – Noah Vedral 1-yard run, Barret Pickering kick (Drive: 5 plays, 75 yards, 1:48; Nebraska 14–3)
- (3:23) IU – Peyton Ramsey 8-yard run (Drive: 7 plays, 71 yards, 3:30; Nebraska 14–9)

Second quarter

- (12:19) IU – Ty Fryfogle 8-yard pass from Peyton Ramsey, Logan Justus kick (Drive: 1 play, 8 yards, 0:05; Indiana 16–14)
- (0:39) NEB – Kanawai Noa 24-yard pass from Luke McCaffrey, Barret Pickering kick (Drive: 6 plays, 74 yards, 1:13; Nebraska 21–16)

Third quarter

- (7:30) IU – Davis Ellis 1-yard run, Peyton Ramsey two-point pass to Peyton Hendershot (Drive: 5 plays, 35 yards, 2:27; Indiana 24–21)
- (2:53) NEB – Barret Pickering 30-yard field goal (Drive: 13 plays, 63 yards, 4:37; Tied 24–24)
- (0:00) IU – Matt Bjorson 2-yard pass from Peyton Ramsey, Logan Justus kick (Drive: 6 plays, 65 yards, 2:53; Indiana 31–24)

Fourth quarter

- (12:08) IU – Stevie Scott III 9-yard run, Logan Justus kick (Drive: 7 plays, 57 yards, 2:17; Indiana 38–24)
- (10:21) NEB – Wan'Dale Robinson 4-yard run, Barret Pickering kick (Drive: 6 plays, 75 yards, 1:47; Indiana 38–31)

| Statistics | IU | NEB |
|---|---|---|
| First downs | 24 | 26 |
| Total yards | 455 | 514 |
| Rushes/yards | 31–104 | 50–220 |
| Passing yards | 351 | 294 |
| Passing: Comp–Att–Int | 27–40–1 | 20–23–0 |
| Time of possession | 32:28 | 27:32 |

| Team | Category | Player | Statistics |
|---|---|---|---|
| Indiana | Passing | Peyton Ramsey | 27/40, 351 yards, 2 TD, INT |
| Indiana | Rushing | Stevie Scott III | 16 carries, 68 yards, TD |
| Indiana | Receiving | Whop Philyor | 14 receptions, 178 yards |
| Nebraska | Passing | Noah Vedral | 14/16, 201 yards |
| Nebraska | Rushing | Wan'Dale Robinson | 22 carries, 83 yards, TD |
| Nebraska | Receiving | J. D. Spielman | 5 receptions, 97 yards |

=== vs Northwestern ===
Northwestern Wildcats (1–6) vs Indiana Hoosiers (6–2) – Game summary

| Quarter | 1 | 2 | 3 | 4 | Total |
|---|---|---|---|---|---|
| Wildcats | 0 | 3 | 0 | 0 | 3 |
| Hoosiers | 10 | 14 | 7 | 3 | 34 |

at Memorial Stadium • Bloomington, Indiana

- Date: November 2, 2019
- Game time: 7:05 p.m.
- Game weather: Sunny, 46 °F (8 °C)
- Game attendance: 40,924
- Referee: Mike Cannon
- TV announcers (FS1): Brian Custer (play-by-play), Robert Smith (analyst)
- Sources: IUHoosiers.com

Game information

First quarter

- (9:39) IU – Logan Justus 24-yard field goal (Drive: 11 plays, 67 yards, 5:21; Indiana 3–0)
- (6:40) IU – Stevie Scott III 2-yard run, Logan Justus kick (Drive: 7 plays, 47 yards, 2:47; Indiana 10–0)

Second quarter

- (14:18) NW – Charlie Kuhbander 25-yard field goal (Drive: 15 plays, 58 yards, 7:22; Indiana 10–3)
- (11:10) IU – Michael Penix Jr. 1-yard run, Logan Justus kick (Drive: 4 plays, 18 yards, 1:34; Indiana 17–3)
- (2:36) IU – Stevie Scott III 2-yard run, Logan Justus kick (Drive: 8 plays, 85 yards, 4:30; Indiana 24–3)

Third quarter

- (1:33) IU – Stevie Scott III 20-yard pass from Peyton Ramsey, Logan Justus kick (Drive: 6 plays, 52 yards, 3:09; Indiana 31–3)

Fourth quarter

- (12:28) IU – Logan Justus 30-yard field goal (Drive: 8 plays, 48 yards, 2:42; Indiana 34–3)

| Statistics | NW | IU |
|---|---|---|
| First downs | 12 | 24 |
| Total yards | 199 | 414 |
| Rushes/yards | 28–87 | 51–144 |
| Passing yards | 112 | 270 |
| Passing: Comp–Att–Int | 12–31–0 | 17–25–0 |
| Time of possession | 21:17 | 38:43 |

| Team | Category | Player | Statistics |
|---|---|---|---|
| Northwestern | Passing | Hunter Johnson | 7/17, 65 yards |
| Northwestern | Rushing | Aidan Smith | 6 carries, 34 yards |
| Northwestern | Receiving | Ramaud Chiaokhiao-Bowman | 3 receptions, 43 yards |
| Indiana | Passing | Michael Penix Jr. | 10/15, 162 yards |
| Indiana | Rushing | Stevie Scott III | 26 carries, 116 yards, 2 TD |
| Indiana | Receiving | Whop Philyor | 2 receptions, 76 yards |

=== At No. 9 Penn State ===
No. 24 Indiana Hoosiers (7–2) at No. 9 Penn State Nittany Lions (8–1) – Game summary

| Quarter | 1 | 2 | 3 | 4 | Total |
|---|---|---|---|---|---|
| No. 24 Hoosiers | 14 | 0 | 3 | 10 | 27 |
| No. 9 Nittany Lions | 17 | 3 | 7 | 7 | 34 |

at Beaver Stadium • University Park, Pennsylvania

- Date: November 16, 2019
- Game time: 12:00 p.m.
- Game weather: Partly sunny, 36 °F (2 °C)
- Game attendance: 106,323
- Referee: J. Servinski
- TV announcers (ABC): Jason Benetti (play-by-play), Rod Gilmore (analyst), Olivia Dekker (sideline)
- Sources: IUHoosiers.com

Game information

First quarter

- (12:04) PSU – Nick Bowers 12-yard pass from Sean Clifford, Jake Pinegar kick (Drive: 5 plays, 27 yards, 1:46; Penn State 7–0)
- (9:31) IU – Ty Fryfogle 38-yard pass from Peyton Ramsey, Logan Justus kick (Drive: 6 plays, 75 yards, 2:33; Tied 7–7)
- (6:22) PSU – Jake Pinegar 47-yard field goal (Drive: 7 plays, 58 yards, 3:09; Penn State 10–7)
- (3:27) IU – Peyton Ramsey 1-yard run, Logan Justus kick (Drive: 7 plays, 63 yards, 2:55; Indiana 14–10)
- (1:03) PSU – Sean Clifford 38-yard run, Jake Pinegar kick (Drive: 5 plays, 72 yards, 2:24; Penn State 17–14)

Second quarter

- (3:03) PSU – Jake Pinegar 27-yard field goal (Drive: 9 plays, 50 yards, 3:44; Penn State 20–14)

Third quarter

- (10:24) PSU – Journey Brown 35-yard run, Jake Pinegar kick (Drive: 2 plays, 40 yards, 0:28; Penn State 27–14)
- (3:04) IU – Logan Justus 25-yard field goal (Drive: 14 plays, 68 yards, 7:20; Penn State 27–17)

Fourth quarter

- (10:45) IU – Peyton Ramsey 1-yard run, Logan Justus kick (Drive: 11 plays, 91 yards, 5:22; Penn State 27–24)
- (1:44) PSU – Sean Clifford 1-yard run, Jake Pinegar kick (Drive: 18 plays, 75 yards, 9:01; Penn State 34–24)
- (0:13) IU – Logan Justus 27-yard field goal (Drive: 9 plays, 66 yards, 1:31; Penn State 34–27)

| Statistics | IU | PSU |
|---|---|---|
| First downs | 23 | 21 |
| Total yards | 462 | 371 |
| Rushes/yards | 31–91 | 45–192 |
| Passing yards | 371 | 179 |
| Passing: Comp–Att–Int | 31–41–0 | 11–23–0 |
| Time of possession | 32:06 | 27:54 |

| Team | Category | Player | Statistics |
|---|---|---|---|
| Indiana | Passing | Peyton Ramsey | 31/41, 371 yards, TD |
| Indiana | Rushing | Stevie Scott III | 17 carries, 54 yards |
| Indiana | Receiving | Ty Fryfogle | 5 receptions, 131 yards, TD |
| Penn State | Passing | Sean Clifford | 11/23, 179 yards, TD |
| Penn State | Rushing | Journey Brown | 21 carries, 100 yards, TD |
| Penn State | Receiving | K. J. Hamler | 2 receptions, 52 yards |

=== vs No. 13 Michigan ===
No. 13 Michigan Wolverines (8–2) vs Indiana Hoosiers (7–3) – Game summary

| Quarter | 1 | 2 | 3 | 4 | Total |
|---|---|---|---|---|---|
| No. 13 Wolverines | 7 | 14 | 18 | 0 | 39 |
| Hoosiers | 7 | 7 | 0 | 0 | 14 |

at Memorial Stadium • Bloomington, Indiana

- Date: November 23, 2019
- Game time: 3:35 p.m.
- Game weather: Rainy, 37 °F (3 °C)
- Game attendance: 43,671
- Referee: Mark Kluczynski
- TV announcers (ESPN): Sean McDonough (play-by-play), Todd Blackledge (analyst), Holly Rowe (sideline)
- Sources: IUHoosiers.com

Game information

First quarter

- (10:07) IU – Stevie Scott III 1-yard run, Logan Justus kick (Drive: 10 plays, 75 yards, 4:53; Indiana 7–0)
- (5:45) MICH – Ronnie Bell 6-yard pass from Shea Patterson, Quinn Nordin kick (Drive: 8 plays, 80 yards, 4:22; Tied 7–7)

Second quarter

- (14:09) IU – Peyton Ramsey 1-yard run, Logan Justus kick (Drive: 7 plays, 52 yards, 2:44; Indiana 14–7)
- (11:01) MICH – Donovan Peoples-Jones 11-yard pass from Shea Patterson, Quinn Nordin kick (Drive: 8 plays, 62 yards, 3:08; Indiana 14–14)
- (5:37) MICH – Nico Collins 24-yard pass from Shea Patterson, Quinn Nordin kick (Drive: 4 plays, 80 yards, 1:26; Michigan 21–14)

Third quarter

- (10:04) MICH – Quinn Nordin 27-yard field goal (Drive: 11 plays, 63 yards, 4:56; Michigan 24–14)
- (5:10) MICH – Nico Collins 76-yard pass from Shea Patterson, Dylan McCaffrey two-point run (Drive: 2 plays, 80 yards, 0:53; Michigan 32–14)
- (1:39) MICH – Nico Collins 19-yard pass from Shea Patterson, Quinn Nordin kick (Drive: 1 play, 19 yards, 0:07; Michigan 39–14)

Fourth quarter

None

| Statistics | MICH | IU |
|---|---|---|
| First downs | 22 | 19 |
| Total yards | 453 | 321 |
| Rushes/yards | 29–87 | 37–97 |
| Passing yards | 366 | 224 |
| Passing: Comp–Att–Int | 20–32–1 | 18–30–1 |
| Time of possession | 28:06 | 31:52 |

| Team | Category | Player | Statistics |
|---|---|---|---|
| Michigan | Passing | Shea Patterson | 20/32, 366 yards, 5 TD, INT |
| Michigan | Rushing | Zach Charbonnet | 8 carries, 46 yards |
| Michigan | Receiving | Nico Collins | 6 receptions, 165 yards, 3 TD |
| Indiana | Passing | Peyton Ramsey | 17/29, 217 yards, INT |
| Indiana | Rushing | Stevie Scott III | 13 carries, 54 yards, TD |
| Indiana | Receiving | Peyton Hendershot | 6 receptions, 62 yards |

=== At Purdue ===
Indiana Hoosiers (7–4) at Purdue Boilermakers (4–7) – Game summary

| Quarter | 1 | 2 | 3 | 4 | OT | 2OT | Total |
|---|---|---|---|---|---|---|---|
| Hoosiers | 7 | 14 | 7 | 3 | 7 | 6 | 44 |
| Boilermakers | 0 | 10 | 7 | 14 | 7 | 3 | 41 |

at Ross–Ade Stadium • West Lafayette, Indiana

- Date: November 30, 2019
- Game time: 12:00 p.m.
- Game weather: Cloudy, 39 °F (4 °C)
- Game attendance: 55,338
- Referee: Ron Snodgrass
- TV announcers (ESPN2): Anish Shroff (play-by-play), John Congemi (analyst), Kris Budden (sideline)
- Sources: IUHoosiers.com

Game information

First quarter

- IU 05:38 Whop Philyor 8 yd pass from Peyton Ramsey; Logan Justus XP Good (IU 7-0)
- (5:38) IU – Whop Philyor 8-yard pass from Peyton Ramsey, Logan Justus kick (Drive: 12 plays, 91 yards, 6:44; Indiana 7–0)

Second quarter

- IU 12:39 Peyton Ramsey 1 yd run; Logan Justus XP Good (IU 14-0)
- IU 09:52 J.D. Dellinger 20 yd Field Goal (IU 14-3)
- IU 07:04 Brycen Hopkins 72 yd pass from Aidan O'Connell; J.D. Dellinger XP Good (IU 14-0)
- IU 03:20 Sampson James 3 yd run; Logan Justus XP Good (IU 21-10)
- (12:39) IU – Peyton Ramsey 1-yard run, Logan Justus kick (Drive: 11 plays, 47 yards, 5:09; Indiana 14–0)
- (9:52) PUR – J. D. Dellinger 20-yard field goal (Drive: 7 plays, 72 yards, 2:47; Indiana 14–3)
- (7:04) PUR – Brycen Hopkins 72-yard pass from Aidan O'Connell, J. D. Dellinger kick (Drive: 3 plays, 75 yards, 0:43; Indiana 14–10)
- (3:20) IU – Sampson James 3-yard run, Logan Justus kick (Drive: 6 plays, 75 yards, 1:46; Indiana 21–10)

Third quarter

- IU 03:30 Whop Philyor 37 yd pass from Peyton Ramsey; Logan Justus XP Good (IU 28-10)
- IU 01:44 Zander Horvath 1 yd run; J.D. Dellinger XP Good (IU 28-17)
- (3:30) IU – Whop Philyor 37-yard pass from Peyton Ramsey, Logan Justus kick (Drive: 6 plays, 55 yards, 2:26; Indiana 28–10)
- (1:44) PUR – Zander Horvath 1-yard run, J. D. Dellinger kick (Drive: 6 plays, 75 yards, 1:46; Indiana 28–17)

Fourth quarter

- IU 09:13 Zander Horvath 1 yd run; Aidan O'Connell 2 Point Conversion No Good (IU 28-23)
- IU 05:08 Charles Campbell 41 yd Field Goal (IU 31-23)
- IU 02:48 David Bell 20 yd pass from Aidan O'Connell; Brycen Hopkins 2 Point Conversion (TIED 31-31)
- (9:13) PUR – Zander Horvath 1-yard run (Drive: 9 plays, 80 yards, 3:08; Indiana 28–23)
- (5:08) IU – Charles Campbell 41-yard field goal (Drive: 9 plays, 42 yards, 4:05; Indiana 31–23)
- (2:48) PUR – David Bell 20-yard pass from Aidan O'Connell, Aidan O'Connell two-point pass to Brycen Hopkins (Drive: 9 plays, 75 yards, 2:20; Tied 31–31)

Overtime

- (0:00) IU – Nick Westbrook-Ikhine 14-yard pass from Peyton Ramsey, Logan Justus kick (Drive: 6 plays, 25 yards, 0:00; Indiana 38–31)
- (0:00) PUR – Brycen Hopkins 6-yard pass from Aidan O'Connell, J. D. Dellinger kick (Drive: 7 plays, 25 yards, 0:00; Tied 38–38)
- (0:00) PUR – J. D. Dellinger 34-yard field goal (Drive: 4 plays, 8 yards, 0:00; Purdue 41–38)
- (0:00) IU – Peyton Ramsey 1-yard run (Drive: 5 plays, 25 yards, 0:00; Indiana 44–41)

| Statistics | IU | PUR |
|---|---|---|
| First downs | 27 | 28 |
| Total yards | 522 | 589 |
| Rushes/yards | 50–185 | 33–181 |
| Passing yards | 337 | 408 |
| Passing: Comp–Att–Int | 23–39–0 | 28–50–1 |
| Time of possession | 38:05 | 21:55 |

| Team | Category | Player | Statistics |
|---|---|---|---|
| Indiana | Passing | Peyton Ramsey | 23/39, 337 yards, 3 TD |
| Indiana | Rushing | Sampson James | 22 carries, 118 yards, TD |
| Indiana | Receiving | Whop Philyor | 8 receptions, 138 yards, 2 TD |
| Purdue | Passing | Aidan O'Connell | 28/49, 408 yards, 3 TD, INT |
| Purdue | Rushing | Zander Horvath | 23 carries, 164 yards, 2 TD |
| Purdue | Receiving | Brycen Hopkins | 8 receptions, 142 yards, 2 TD |

=== vs Tennessee (Gator Bowl) ===
Tennessee Volunteers (7–5) vs Indiana Hoosiers (8–4) – Game summary
(2020 TaxSlayer Gator Bowl)

| Quarter | 1 | 2 | 3 | 4 | Total |
|---|---|---|---|---|---|
| Hoosiers | 0 | 3 | 16 | 3 | 22 |
| Volunteers | 0 | 6 | 3 | 14 | 23 |

at TIAA Bank Field • Jacksonville, Florida

- Date: January 2, 2020
- Game time: 7:00 p.m.
- Game weather: Sunny, 72 °F (22 °C)
- Game attendance: 61,789
- Referee: Mike McCabe
- TV announcers (ESPN): Tom Hart (play-by-play), Tim Hasselbeck (analyst), Katie George (sideline)
- Sources: IUHoosiers.com

Game information

First Quarter

None

Second Quarter

- (14:49) TENN – Brent Cimaglia 23-yard field goal (Drive: 12 plays, 67 yards, 6:04; Tennessee 3–0)
- (5:21) TENN – Brent Cimaglia 32-yard field goal (Drive: 14 plays, 50 yards, 6:14; Tennessee 6–0)
- (0:00) IU – Logan Justus 24-yard field goal (Drive: 10 plays, 36 yards, 2:24; Tennessee 6–3)

Third Quarter

- (9:29) IU – Peyton Ramsey 1-yard run, Logan Justus kick (Drive: 12 plays, 69 yards, 5:31; Indiana 10–6)
- (8:26) IU – Jamar Johnson 63-yard interception return (Drive: 2 plays, 1 yard, 1:03; Indiana 16–6)
- (4:11) TENN – Brent Cimaglia 43-yard field goal (Drive: 10 plays, 49 yards, 4:15; Indiana 16–9)
- (1:01) IU – Logan Justus 49-yard field goal (Drive: 8 plays, 46 yards, 3:10; Indiana 19–9)

Fourth Quarter

- (10:27) IU – Logan Justus 30-yard field goal (Drive: 7 plays, 35 yards, 3:54; Indiana 22–9)
- (4:21) TENN – Quavaris Crouch 1-yard run, Brent Cimaglia kick (Drive: 10 plays, 82 yards, 2:45; Indiana 22–16)
- (3:51) TENN – Eric Gray 16-yard run, Brent Cimaglia kick (Drive: 3 plays, 54 yards, 0:30; Tennessee 23–22)

| Statistics | IU | TENN |
|---|---|---|
| First downs | 17 | 19 |
| Total yards | 303 | 374 |
| Rushes/yards | 31–76 | 35–136 |
| Passing yards | 227 | 238 |
| Passing: Comp–Att–Int | 20–34–1 | 19–34–2 |
| Time of possession | 29:27 | 30:33 |

| Team | Category | Player | Statistics |
|---|---|---|---|
| Indiana | Passing | Peyton Ramsey | 20/34, 227 yards, INT |
| Indiana | Rushing | Peyton Ramsey | 17 carries, 54 yards, TD |
| Indiana | Receiving | Peyton Hendershot | 6 receptions, 67 yards |
| Tennessee | Passing | Jarrett Guarantano | 18/31, 221 yards, 2 INT |
| Tennessee | Rushing | Eric Gray | 14 carries, 86 yards, TD |
| Tennessee | Receiving | Josh Palmer | 6 receptions, 68 yards |

== Roster ==
2019 Indiana Hoosiers football team roster
Players
Coaches
Offense

| Pos. | # | Name | Class |
|---|---|---|---|
| WR | 1 | Whop Philyor | Jr |
| WR | 3 | Ty Fryfogle | Jr |
| WR | 6 | Donavan Hale | Sr |
| RB | 8 | Stevie Scott III | So |
| QB | 9 | Michael Penix Jr. (injured) | Fr |
| WR | 10 | David Ellis | Fr |
| QB | 12 | Peyton Ramsey | Jr |
| WR | 13 | Miles Marshall | Fr |
| QB | 14 | Jack Tuttle | Fr |
| QB | 15 | Zack Merrill | Fr |
| WR | 15 | Nick Westbrook-Ikhine | Sr |
| QB | 16 | Grant Gremel | Fr |
| WR | 17 | Jordan Jakes | Fr |
| WR | 18 | Jacolby Hewitt | Fr |
| WR | 19 | Luke Shayotovich | Fr |
| RB | 20 | Cole Gest | Jr |
| RB | 23 | Ronnie Walker Jr. | So |
| RB | 24 | Sampson James | Fr |
| QB | 25 | Will Jontz | Fr |
| WR | 25 | Cam Wilson | So |
| TE | 33 | Dominick Sidari | Jr |
| RB | 34 | Davion Ervin-Poindexter | Fr |
| RB | 37 | Ahrod Lloyd | So |
| RB | 38 | Connor Thomas | Jr |
| TE | 39 | Ryan Barnes | Fr |
| OL | 51 | Mackenzie Nworah | Jr |
| OL | 52 | DaVondre Love | Sr |
| OL | 54 | Coy Cronk | Sr |
| OL | 55 | Luke Lane | Fr |
| OL | 56 | Mike Katic | Fr |
| OL | 57 | Harry Crider | Jr |
| OL | 61 | Ricky Tamis | Fr |
| OL | 65 | Dominic Altimari | So |
| OL | 66 | Aidan Rafferty | Fr |
| OL | 68 | Hunter Littlejohn | Sr |
| OL | 70 | Peter Schulz | Fr |
| OL | 72 | Simon Stepaniak | Sr |
| OL | 73 | Tim Weaver | Fr |
| OL | 74 | Nick Marozas | Fr |
| OL | 76 | Matthew Bedford | Fr |
| OL | 77 | Caleb Jones | So |
| OL | 78 | Britt Beery | So |
| OL | 79 | Charlie O'Connor | Fr |
| WR | 80 | Da'Shaun Brown | Fr |
| TE | 81 | Gary Cooper | Fr |
| WR | 82 | Christian Harris | Jr |
| WR | 83 | Bryan Parker | Jr |
| TE | 84 | Turon Ivy Jr. | Fr |
| WR | 85 | McCall Ray | Fr |
| TE | 86 | Peyton Hendershot | So |
| WR | 88 | Justin Berry | Jr |
| TE | 89 | Matt Bjorson | So |

Defense

| Pos. | # | Name | Class |
|---|---|---|---|
| DB | 2 | Reese Taylor | So |
| DB | 3 | Tiawan Mullen | Fr |
| DB | 4 | Cam Jones | So |
| DB | 5 | Juwan Burgess | So |
| DL | 6 | James Head Jr. | So |
| LB | 7 | Reakwon Jones | Sr |
| LB | 8 | James Miller | Fr |
| DB | 9 | Marcelino McCrary-Ball | Jr |
| DB | 13 | Larry Tracy III | Fr |
| DB | 14 | Andre Brown Jr. | Sr |
| DB | 17 | Raheem Layne | Jr |
| DL | 18 | Jonathan King | Fr |
| WR | 19 | Josh Sanguinetti | Fr |
| DB | 20 | Joseph Daniels Jr. | Fr |
| DB | 21 | Noah Pierre | Fr |
| DB | 22 | Jamar Johnson | So |
| DB | 23 | Jaylin Williams | So |
| DB | 27 | Devon Matthews | So |
| DB | 28 | A’Shon Riggins | Sr |
| DB | 29 | Khalil Bryant | Sr |
| DB | 30 | Jordan Jusevitch | Fr |
| DB | 31 | Bryant Fitzgerald | So |
| DB | 35 | DeKaleb Thomas | Fr |
| DB | 38 | Jeremy Boyd | So |
| LB | 40 | Cameron Williams | Fr |
| DL | 41 | Beau Robbins | Fr |
| LB | 42 | D. K. Bonhomme | Fr |
| DB | 43 | Samual Slusher | So |
| LB | 44 | Thomas Allen | So |
| LB | 46 | Aaron Casey | Fr |
| LB | 47 | Micah McFadden | So |
| LB | 48 | Robert Tolbert IV | Fr |
| DL | 49 | Madison Norris | Fr |
| DL | 50 | Sio Nofoagatoto'a | Fr |
| DL | 53 | Stephen Walker II | Fr |
| DL | 55 | C. J. Person | Fr |
| DL | 58 | Jake Ostrowski | So |
| DL | 59 | Gavin McCabe | Fr |
| DL | 67 | Christian Love | Fr |
| DL | 69 | Gavin Everett | Sr |
| DL | 87 | Michael Ziemba | Jr |
| DL | 90 | Connor Schneider | So |
| DL | 91 | Jeramy Passmore | Fr |
| DL | 92 | Alfred Bryant | So |
| DL | 93 | Juan Harris | So |
| DL | 94 | DeMarcus Elliott | So |
| DL | 95 | Antoine Whitner Jr. | Fr |
| DL | 96 | Shamar Jones | Fr |
| DL | 97 | Tramar Reece | So |
| DL | 98 | Jerome Johnson | Jr |
| DL | 99 | Allen Stallings IV | Sr |

Special teams

| Pos. | # | Name | Class |
|---|---|---|---|
| LS | 60 | Jacob Limbach | Jr |
| K | 82 | Logan Justus | Sr |
| P | 83 | Asher King | Fr |
| K | 87 | Jack Cardillo | So |
| K | 90 | Jared Smolar | Jr |
| P | 92 | Chase Wyatt | Fr |
| K | 93 | Charles Campbell | Fr |
| P | 94 | Haydon Whitehead | Sr |
| LS | 95 | Sean Wracher | Fr |
| K | 99 | Nathanael Snyder | Jr |

Head coach

- Tom Allen

Coordinators/assistant coaches

- Kalen DeBoer (associate head coach / oc / quarterbacks)
- Kane Wommack (defensive coordinator / linebackers)
- Mark Hagen (assistant defensive coordinator / defensive line)
- Mike Hart (assistant head coach / running backs)
- Grant Heard (passing game coordinator / wide receivers)
- Darren Hiller (run game coordinator / offensive line)
- William Inge (special teams coordinator)
- Brandon Shelby (cornerbacks)
- Nick Sheridan (tight ends)
- Kasey Teegardin (safeties)
- David Ballou (director of athletic performance)
- Danny Friend (graduate assistant - offense)
- Mike Piatkowski (graduate assistant - offense)
- Jim Nelson (graduate assistant - defense)

Legend

- (C) Team captain
- (S) Suspended
- (I) Ineligible
- Injured
- Redshirt

Roster
Last update: September 20, 2019

== Awards and honors ==
=== Award watch lists ===
Listed in the order that they were released

| Award | Player | Position | Year | Date Awarded | Ref |
|---|---|---|---|---|---|
| Maxwell Award | Stevie Scott | RB | SO | July 15, 2019 | |
| Rimington Trophy | Hunter LittleJohn | C | SR (redshirt) | July 19, 2019 | |
| Outland Trophy | Coy Cronk | OL | SR | July 23, 2019 | |
| Lou Groza Award | Logan Justus | K | SR (redshirt) | July 24, 2019 | |
| Wuerffel Trophy | Nick Westbrook-Ikhine | WR | SR (redshirt) | July 25, 2019 | |
| Fred Biletnikoff Award | Whop Philyor | WR | JR | October 30, 2019 | |
| Broyles Award | Kalen DeBoer | Offensive coordinator | | November 13, 2019 | |
| George Munger Award | Tom Allen | Head Coach | | November 20, 2019 | |

=== Players of the Week ===
Big Ten Weekly Awards
| Player | Award | Date Awarded | Ref. |
|---|---|---|---|
| Michael Penix Jr. | Big Ten Freshmen of the Week | September 2, 2019 | |
| Logan Justus | Big Ten Special Teams Player of the Week | September 2, 2019 | |
| Michael Penix Jr. | Big Ten Freshmen of the Week | September 30, 2019 | |
| Stevie Scott | Big Ten Offensive Player of the Week | November 4, 2019 | |

=== B1G Conference awards ===
Awards
| Player | Award | Date Awarded | Ref. |
|---|---|---|---|
| Stevie Scott | Second Team All-Big Ten Offensive Teams | December 4, 2019 | |
| Whop Philyor | Second Team All-Big Ten Offensive Teams | December 4, 2019 | |
| Simon Stepaniak | Third Team All-Big Ten Offensive Teams | December 4, 2019 | |
| Peyton Hendershot | Third Team All-Big Ten Offensive Teams | December 4, 2019 | |
| Logan Justus | Second Team All-Big Ten Special Teams | December 3, 2019 | |
| Doug Schlereth | Ford-Kinnick Leadership Award (B1G Individual Honor) | December 3, 2019 | |

== Radio ==
Radio coverage for all games will be broadcast on IUHoosiers.com. All-Access and on various radio frequencies throughout the state. The primary radio announcer is long-time broadcaster Don Fischer with Play-by-Play.

== Players drafted into the NFL ==
| Round | Pick | Player | Position | NFL Club |
|---|---|---|---|---|
| 6 | 209 | Simon Stepaniak | OT | Green Bay Packers |
