= Nigel Warrior =

American football player (born 1997)

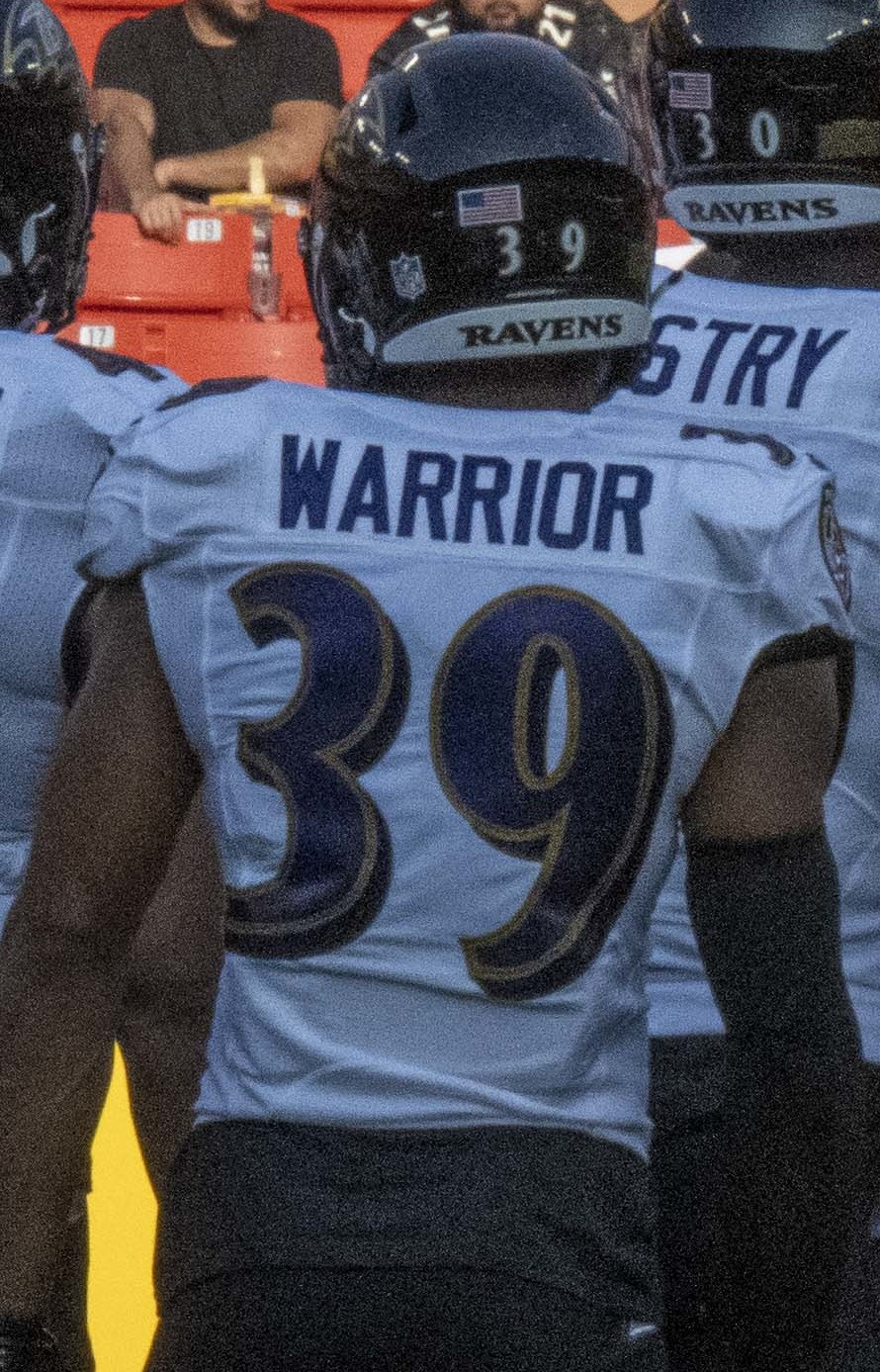
- Warrior with the Baltimore Ravens in 2021

Profile
- Position: Safety / Cornerback

Personal information
- Born: December 14, 1997 (age 28); College Park, Georgia, U.S.
- Listed height: 6 ft 1 in (1.85 m)
- Listed weight: 197 lb (89 kg)

Career information
- High school: Peachtree Ridge (Suwanee, Georgia)
- College: Tennessee
- NFL draft: 2020: undrafted

Career history
- Baltimore Ravens (2020); Seattle Seahawks (2021); Montreal Alouettes (2024)*
- * Offseason or practice squad member only
- Stats at Pro Football Reference

Nigel Warrior (born December 14, 1997) is an American professional football safety. He played college football at Tennessee.

== Early life ==
Warrior played high school football at Peachtree Ridge High School.

== College career ==
Warrior played at the University of Tennessee from 2016 to 2019 under head coaches Butch Jones and Jeremy Pruitt.

In the 2016 season, Warrior appeared in five games and had 22 total tackles. In the 2017 season, Warrior recorded a 70-yard pick-six against Missouri. He appeared in 12 games and had 83 total tackles, one sack, three passes defended, three forced fumbles, and the pick-six. In the 2018 season, he appeared in 12 games and had 64 total tackles and one pass defended. In the 2019 season, he appeared in 12 games and had 60 total tackles, four interceptions, and seven passes defended. He recorded one of his interceptions in the Alabama game. The Crimson Tide were threatening to score in Tennessee territory and Warrior's interception flipped the field.

== Professional career ==
=== Baltimore Ravens ===
Warrior was not selected in the 2020 NFL draft. He signed as an undrafted free agent with the Baltimore Ravens. He was waived after training camp and signed to the practice squad, where he spent his entire rookie season.

On August 31, 2021, Warrior was waived by the Ravens.

=== Seattle Seahawks ===
On September 1, 2021, Warrior was claimed by the Seattle Seahawks from waivers. He was placed on injured reserve on September 7, 2021. He was activated on November 27. On April 25, 2022, the Seahawks withdrew Warrior's exclusive rights free agent tender making him an unrestricted free agent.

=== Montreal Alouettes ===
Warrior signed with the Montreal Alouettes of the Canadian Football League (CFL) on January 22, 2024. He was released by the Alouettes on May 27.

== Personal life ==
His parents are Tangie Warrior and former NFL cornerback Dale Carter.

His uncle is former Minnesota Vikings Wide Receiver Jake Reed, and his first cousin, Jake's son, is CFL/former NFL safety J.R. Reed. Both Reed and Warrior participated and were left undrafted in the 2020 NFL draft.
