= Bryce Thompson (American football) =

American football player (born 1999)

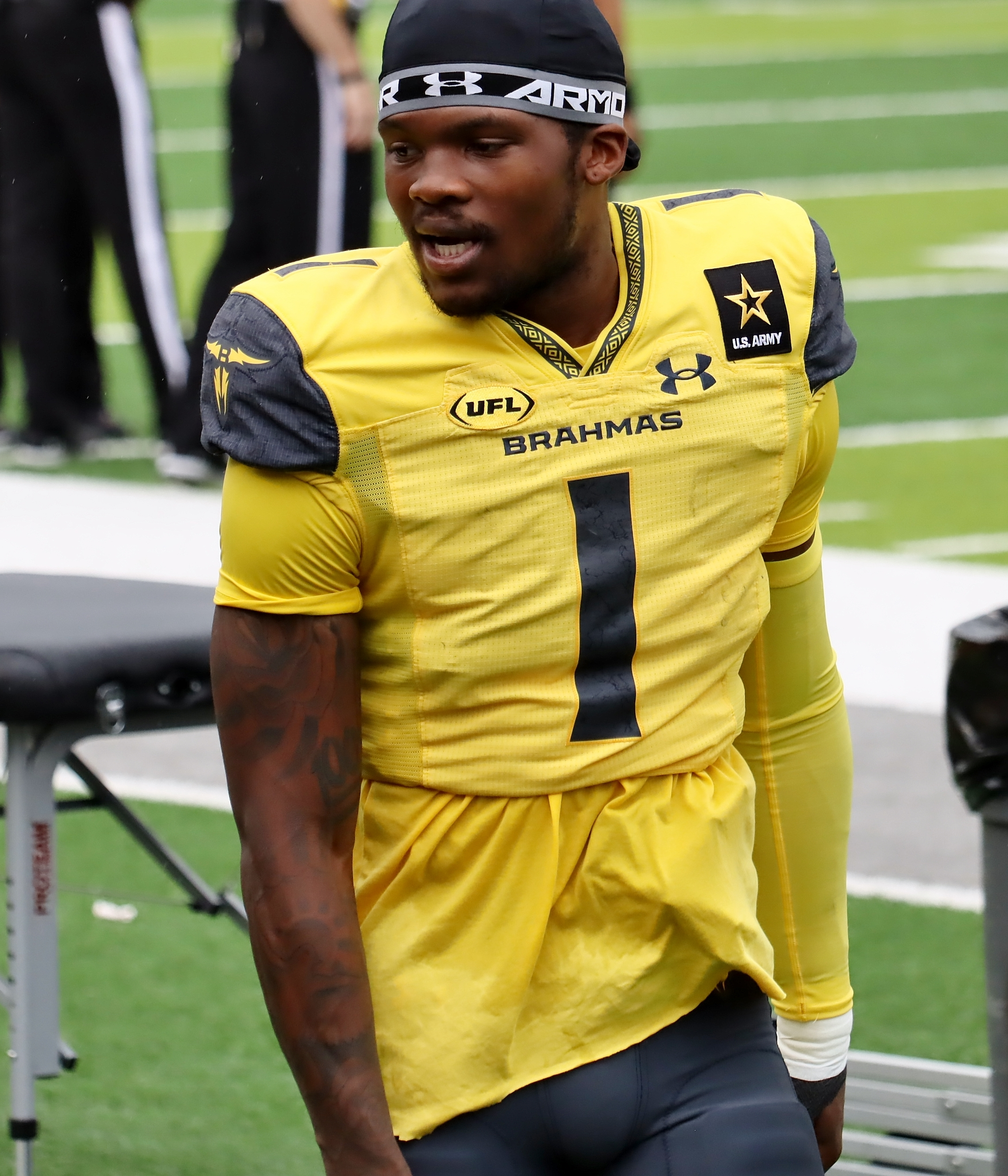
- Thompson with the San Antonio Brahmas in 2024

No. 1 – DC Defenders
- Position: Cornerback
- Roster status: Active

Personal information
- Born: September 20, 1999 (age 27); Irmo, South Carolina, U.S.
- Listed height: 5 ft 11 in (1.80 m)
- Listed weight: 187 lb (85 kg)

Career information
- High school: Dutch Fork (Irmo)
- College: Tennessee
- NFL draft: 2021: undrafted

Career history
- New Orleans Saints (2021–2022); Seattle Sea Dragons (2023); Miami Dolphins (2023)*; San Antonio Brahmas (2024); DC Defenders (2025–present)
- * Offseason or practice squad member only

Awards and highlights
- UFL champion (2025)

Career NFL statistics
- Total tackles: 2
- Stats at Pro Football Reference

Bryce Thompson (born September 20, 1999) is an American professional football cornerback for the DC Defenders of the United Football League (UFL). He played college football at Tennessee.

== Early life ==
Thompson attended and played high school football at Dutch Fork in Irmo, South Carolina, during his freshman and sophomore years. He transferred to Ben Lippen School in Columbia, SC for his junior year where he led the falcons to their first state championship in football. Thompson returned to Dutch Fork High School for his senior year where he helped the silver foxes capture their third state championship.

== College career ==
Thompson played at the University of Tennessee from 2018–2020 under head coach Jeremy Pruitt. Thompson started 10 of 12 games in his freshman season, finishing with the highest grade of any freshman cornerback in the nation, with three interceptions and seven pass break-ups. In his sophomore year, he finished with three interceptions, along with 32 tackles and a sack. As a junior he played 10 games, finishing with a career-high 36 tackles, two interceptions, a force fumble and a fumble recovery. In January 2021, Thompson announced he was foregoing his senior year to declare for the 2021 NFL draft.

== Professional career ==
Pre-draft measurables
Height	Weight	Arm length	Hand span	Wingspan	40-yard dash	10-yard split	20-yard split	20-yard shuttle	Three-cone drill	Vertical jump	Broad jump	Bench press
5 ft 10 5/8 in (1.79 m)	182 lb (83 kg)	30 3/4 in (0.78 m)	9 1/4 in (0.23 m)	6 ft 2 1/4 in (1.89 m)	4.56 s	1.53 s	2.67 s	4.25 s	7.19 s	34.0 in (0.86 m)	10 ft 0 in (3.05 m)	9 reps
All values from Pro Day

=== New Orleans Saints ===
After going undrafted in the 2021 NFL draft, Thompson signed for the New Orleans Saints as an undrafted free agent on May 2, 2021. He was waived by the Saints, with an injury designation on August 26, before being waived from injured reserve on September 3. Thompson re-signed to the Saints practice squad on October 5. He made his NFL debut in week 16 of the 2021 NFL season against the Miami Dolphins having been a gameday COVID-19 replacement activated from the practice squad. He signed a reserve/future contract with the Saints on January 12, 2022.

Thompson was waived/injured on August 10, 2022, and was placed on injured reserve the next day. He was waived off injured reserve on August 15. He was re-signed to the practice squad on October 5. He was promoted to the active roster on October 8. He was waived on November 1 and re-signed to the practice squad. He was promoted back to the active roster on November 19, then waived two days later.

=== Seattle Sea Dragons ===
On January 20, 2023, Thompson signed with the Seattle Sea Dragons of the XFL. He was released from his contract on May 15.

=== Miami Dolphins ===
On May 15, 2023, Thompson signed with the Miami Dolphins. He was waived on August 29.

=== San Antonio Brahmas ===
On December 26, 2023, Thompson signed with the San Antonio Brahmas of the XFL.

=== DC Defenders ===
On November 14, 2024, Thompson was traded to the DC Defenders in exchange for DE Jalen Harris.
