= Matthew Butler (American football) =

American football player (born 1999)

No. 91 – Miami Dolphins
- Position: Defensive tackle
- Roster status: Practice squad

Personal information
- Born: June 10, 1999 (age 27); Fayetteville, North Carolina, U.S.
- Listed height: 6 ft 3 in (1.91 m)
- Listed weight: 319 lb (145 kg)

Career information
- High school: Garner Magnet (Garner, North Carolina)
- College: Tennessee (2017–2021)
- NFL draft: 2022: 5th round, 175th overall pick

Career history
- Las Vegas Raiders (2022–2024); Miami Dolphins (2025–present)

Career NFL statistics as of 2024
- Total tackles: 27
- Sacks: 0.5
- Stats at Pro Football Reference

Matthew Edward Butler (born June 10, 1999) is an American professional football defensive tackle for the Miami Dolphins of the National Football League (NFL). He played college football for the Tennessee Volunteers.

== Early life ==
Butler attended Garner Magnet High School in Garner, North Carolina. While there, he played high school football for the Trojans. As a senior, he had 96 tackles and 26 sacks. He committed to the University of Tennessee to play college football.

== College career ==
Butler played at Tennessee from 2017 to 2021 under head coaches Butch Jones, Jeremy Pruitt, and Josh Heupel. During his career he played in 52 games with 25 starts and had 152 tackles and 9.5 sacks.

== Professional career ==
Pre-draft measurables
Height	Weight	Arm length	Hand span	Wingspan	40-yard dash	10-yard split	20-yard split	20-yard shuttle	Three-cone drill	Vertical jump	Broad jump	Bench press
6 ft 3 7/8 in (1.93 m)	297 lb (135 kg)	33 1/2 in (0.85 m)	9 1/4 in (0.23 m)	6 ft 9 5/8 in (2.07 m)	5.00 s	1.73 s	2.89 s	4.81 s	7.89 s	34.0 in (0.86 m)	9 ft 5 in (2.87 m)	17 reps
All values from NFL Combine/Pro Day

=== Las Vegas Raiders ===
Butler was selected by the Las Vegas Raiders with the 175th overall pick in the fifth round of the 2022 NFL draft. He made his NFL debut in Week 3 of the 2022 season against the Tennessee Titans. He appeared in six games in his rookie season.

On August 29, 2023, Butler was waived by the Raiders and re-signed to the practice squad. He was promoted to the active roster on January 6, 2024.

On August 27, 2024, Butler was waived by the Raiders and re-signed to the practice squad. He was signed to the active roster on October 10.

On March 26, 2025, Butler re-signed with the Raiders. He was waived on May 12.

=== Miami Dolphins ===
On May 13, 2025, Butler was claimed off waivers by the Miami Dolphins.

On March 12, 2026, Butler re-signed with the Dolphins. On August 30, he was released by Miami as a part of final roster cuts. He re-signed to the practice squad on November 17.
