= Stevie Scott =

American gridiron football player (born 2000)

- Scott with the Montreal Alouettes in 2026

No. 8 – Montreal Alouettes
- Position: Running back
- Roster status: Active
- CFL status: American

Personal information
- Born: May 13, 2000 (age 26); Syracuse, New York, U.S.
- Listed height: 6 ft 0 in (1.83 m)
- Listed weight: 231 lb (105 kg)

Career information
- High school: Christian Brothers Academy (DeWitt, New York)
- College: Indiana (2018–2020)
- NFL draft: 2021: undrafted

Career history
- New Orleans Saints (2021)*; Denver Broncos (2021)*; Michigan Panthers (2022); Denver Broncos (2022)*; Michigan Panthers (2023); Arizona Cardinals (2023)*; San Antonio Brahmas (2024)*; Montreal Alouettes (2024–present)
- * Offseason or practice squad member only

Awards and highlights
- 2× Second-team All-Big Ten (2019, 2020)
- Stats at Pro Football Reference

Stevie Scott III (born May 13, 2000) is an American professional football running back for the Montreal Alouettes of the Canadian Football League (CFL). He played college football for the Indiana Hoosiers.

== Early life ==
Stevie Scott III was born on May 13, 2000, to parents Stevie Scott Jr. and Aisha Lively. Scott attended Christian Brothers Academy and played running back and linebacker on the high school football team. He rushed for 2,500 yards and 40 touchdowns over his sophomore and junior seasons. He was an all-state and all-central New York selection in 2016. An injury limited him to three games in 2017. He was a three-star recruit and accepted a football scholarship offer from Indiana over others.

== College career ==
Set Indiana true freshman records in 2018 with 1,137 yards, 228 attempts, 10 touchdowns and six 100-yard games.

Rushed for 845 yards on 178 attempts in 2019, and led the team in total scores and all purpose yards per game (96.0) that year. Despite missing his last two games to injury, he was voted second-team all Big Ten.

Totaled 561 rushing yards on 156 attempts in 2020, and voted second-team all Big Ten for the second time in a row. He would declare for the NFL draft on January 19, 2021.

== Professional career ==
Pre-draft measurables
| Height | Weight | Arm length | Hand span | Wingspan | 40-yard dash | 10-yard split | 20-yard split | 20-yard shuttle | Three-cone drill | Vertical jump | Broad jump | Bench press |
|---|---|---|---|---|---|---|---|---|---|---|---|---|
| 6 ft 0 3/8 in (1.84 m) | 225 lb (102 kg) | 33 1/4 in (0.84 m) | 9 3/4 in (0.25 m) | 6 ft 7 3/4 in (2.03 m) | 4.66 s | 1.65 s | 2.77 s | 4.58 s | 7.15 s | 31.0 in (0.79 m) | 9 ft 11 in (3.02 m) | 18 reps |
All values from NFL Combine/Pro Day

=== New Orleans Saints ===
On May 1, 2021, Scott signed with the New Orleans Saints as an undrafted free agent. He was waived on August 15, 2021.

=== Denver Broncos (first stint) ===
On August 23, 2021, Scott signed with the Denver Broncos. He was released on August 31, 2021.

=== Michigan Panthers (first stint) ===
On February 23, 2022, Scott was selected as the fourth pick in the 27th round in the 2022 USFL draft by the Michigan Panthers.

=== Denver Broncos (second stint) ===
On August 10, 2022, Scott again signed with the Broncos. He was waived on August 23, 2022.

=== Michigan Panthers (second stint) ===
On April 17, 2023, he signed with the Panthers.

=== Arizona Cardinals ===
On August 10, 2023, Scott was signed by the Arizona Cardinals. He was waived on August 14, 2023. He was re-signed on August 21, 2023.

On August 29, 2023, Scott was released by the Cardinals as part of final roster cuts before the start of the 2023 season.

=== San Antonio Brahmas ===
On December 15, 2023, Scott was signed by the San Antonio Brahmas of the XFL.

=== Montreal Alouettes ===
Scott signed with the Montreal Alouettes of the CFL on February 1, 2024.
