= Ramel Keyton =

American football player (born 2000)

Profile
- Position: Wide receiver

Personal information
- Born: September 14, 2000 (age 26); Marietta, Georgia, U.S.
- Listed height: 6 ft 2 in (1.88 m)
- Listed weight: 191 lb (87 kg)

Career information
- High school: Marietta (Marietta, Georgia)
- College: Tennessee (2019–2023)
- NFL draft: 2024: undrafted

Career history
- Las Vegas Raiders (2024); Tennessee Titans (2025)*
- * Offseason or practice squad member only

Career NFL statistics as of 2024
- Receptions: 1
- Receiving yards: 7
- Stats at Pro Football Reference

Ramel Pierre Keyton (born September 14, 2000) is an American professional football wide receiver. He played college football for the Tennessee Volunteers, and signed with the Las Vegas Raiders as an undrafted free agent in 2024.

== Early life ==
Coming out of high school, Keyton was rated as a four star recruit where he decided to commit to play college football for the Tennessee Volunteers.

== College career ==
In Keyton's freshman season in 2019, he tallied four receptions for 104 yards, while also rushing for ten yards. During the 2020 season, Keyton played in seven games notching nine receptions for 76 yards. During the 2021 season, Keyton totaled seven receptions for 72 yards. In week seven of the 2022 season, Keyton had 77 yards and two touchdowns in a win over UT Martin. In the 2022 Orange Bowl, Keyton hauled in four receptions for 76 yards and a touchdown versus Clemson. Keyton finished the 2022 season bringing in 31 receptions for 562 yards and five touchdowns. During the 2023 season, Keyton would start all 13 games for the Volunteers, where he notched 35 receptions for 642 yards and six touchdowns. After the conclusion of the 2023 season, Keyton decided to declare for the 2024 NFL draft.

== Professional career ==
Pre-draft measurables
Height	Weight	Arm length	Hand span	40-yard dash	10-yard split	20-yard split	20-yard shuttle	Three-cone drill	Vertical jump	Broad jump
6 ft 2 3/8 in (1.89 m)	191 lb (87 kg)	32 2/4 in (0.83 m)	9 7/8 in (0.25 m)	4.51 s	1.57 s	2.57 s	4.42 s	7.07 s	33.5 in (0.85 m)	10 ft 4 in (3.15 m)
All values from Pro Day

=== Las Vegas Raiders ===
After not being selected in the 2024 NFL draft, Keyton decided to sign with the Las Vegas Raiders as an undrafted free agent. After an impressive preseason, Keyton made the Raiders initial 53-man roster as an undrafted rookie. He was waived on September 28, and re-signed to the practice squad. He was promoted to the active roster on November 1.

On April 25, 2025, Keyton was waived by the Raiders.

=== Tennessee Titans ===
On July 28, 2025, Keyton signed with the Tennessee Titans. He was waived by Tennessee on August 3.
