= Peyton Ramsey =

American football player (born 1997)

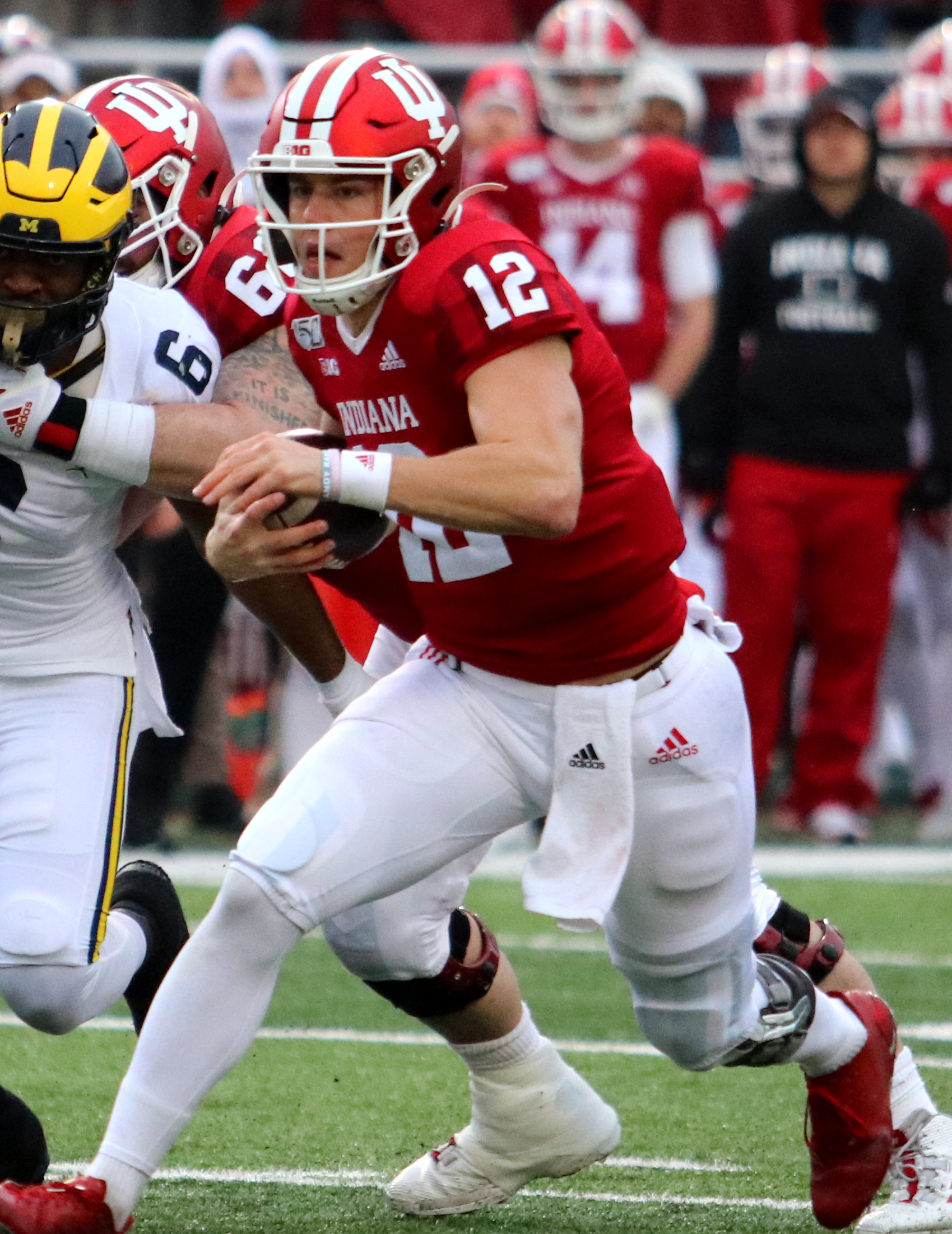
- Ramsey with the Indiana Hoosiers in 2019

No. 12
- Position: Quarterback

Personal information
- Born: October 31, 1997 (age 28); Cincinnati, Ohio, U.S.
- Height: 6 ft 2 in (1.88 m)
- Weight: 220 lb (100 kg)

Career information
- High school: Elder (Cincinnati, Ohio)
- College: Indiana (2016–2019); Northwestern (2020)

Awards and highlights
- Third team All-Big Ten (2020)
- Stats at Pro Football Reference

Peyton Ramsey (born October 31, 1997) is an American former college football quarterback who played for the Indiana Hoosiers and Northwestern Wildcats.

== Early life ==
Ramsey grew up in Cincinnati, Ohio and attended Elder High School, where he played football and basketball. His father, Doug Ramsey, is Elder's head football coach. He was named the Greater Catholic League South Player of the Year after he threw for 2,062 yards and 13 touchdowns and rushed for 908 yards and 12 touchdowns in his junior season. As a senior, Ramsey passed for 2,689 yards passing and 26 touchdowns and rushed for 1,232 yards and 16 touchdowns and repeated as the conference player of the year. At Elder, Ramsay set records for passing yardage, total touchdowns, completions and attempts, and held single-game records for the latter three.

== College career ==
=== Indiana ===
Ramsey redshirted his true freshman season. He played in nine games with four starts as a redshirt freshman and was named the Big Ten Conference All-Freshman team after passing for 1,252 yards with 10 touchdowns and five interceptions and rushing for 226 and two touchdowns. Ramsey started all 12 of the Hoosiers games as a redshirt sophomore and threw for 2,875 yards and 19 touchdowns while running for 354 yards and five touchdowns. Ramsey lost his starting job as a redshirt junior to Michael Penix Jr., but returned as the starter after Penix suffered a season ending injury and was named honorable mention All-Big Ten after passing for 2,454 yards and 13 touchdowns. After the season, Ramsey announced that he would be leaving the program.

=== Northwestern ===
Ramsey joined the Northwestern Wildcats as a graduate transfer for the 2020 season. Ramsey was named the Wildcats' starting quarterback and was named third-team all Big Ten after completing 172-of-282 passes for 1,733 yards with 12 touchdowns and 8 interceptions in nine games in a shortened season. Ramsey was named the Most Valuable Player of the 2021 Citrus Bowl after completing 24-of-35 passes for 291 yards and three touchdowns and running for 50 yards in a 35-19 win over the Auburn Tigers. Ramsey declared for the 2021 NFL draft. After going undrafted, he attended rookie minicamp on a tryout basis with the Carolina Panthers.

== Personal life ==
Ramsey is named after Hall of Fame quarterback Peyton Manning.
