= Jeremy Pruitt =

American football player and coach (born 1974)

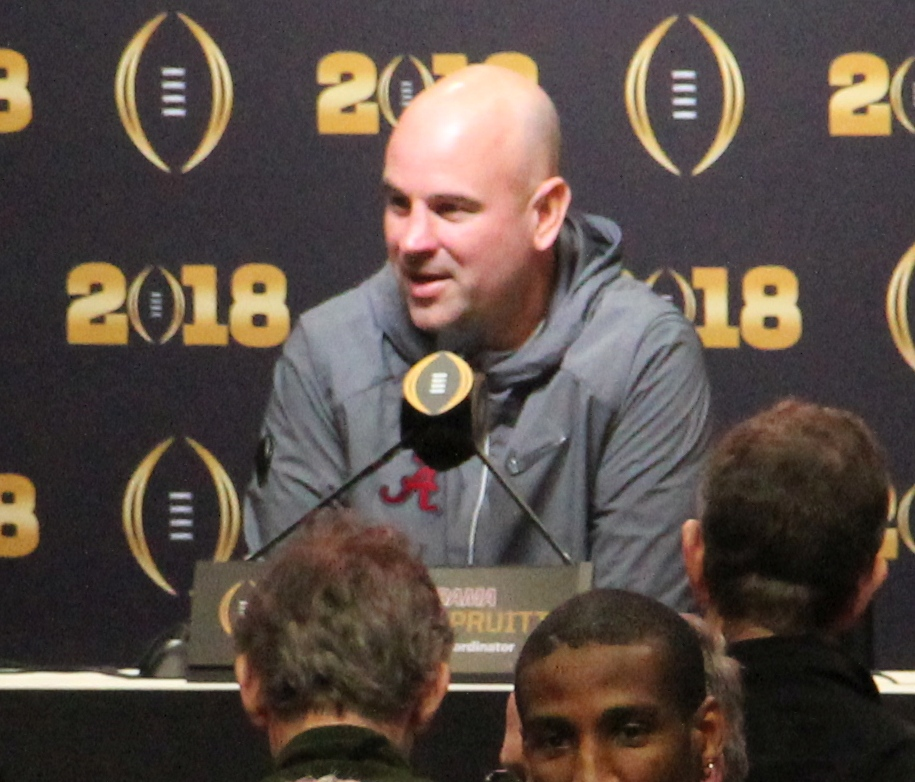
- Pruitt in 2018

Personal information
- Born: May 28, 1974 (age 52); Rainsville, Alabama, U.S.

Career information
- High school: Plainview (Rainsville)
- College: Middle Tennessee; Alabama

Career history
- Alabama (1997) Graduate assistant; Plainview HS (AL) (1998) Defensive backs coach; West Alabama (1999) Defensive backs coach; Plainview HS (2000) Defensive coordinator; Fort Payne HS (AL) (2001–2003) Assistant coach; Hoover HS (AL) (2004) Defensive backs coach; Hoover HS (AL) (2005–2006) Defensive coordinator & defensive backs coach; Alabama (2007–2009) Director of player development; Alabama (2010–2012) Defensive backs coach; Florida State (2013) Defensive coordinator & defensive backs coach; Georgia (2014–2015) Defensive coordinator & defensive backs coach; Alabama (2016–2017) Defensive coordinator & inside linebackers coach; Tennessee (2018–2020) Head coach; New York Giants (2021) Senior defensive assistant

Awards and highlights
- 5× National Champion (2009, 2011, 2012, 2013, 2017)

Head coaching record
- Career: NCAA: 5–19 (.208); Bowls: 0–0 (–)

Jeremy Pruitt (born May 28, 1974) is an American football coach. He previously served as the head coach at the University of Tennessee from 2018 to 2020 and defensive coordinator at the University of Alabama from 2016 to 2017, University of Georgia from 2014 to 2015, and Florida State University in 2013.

As a defensive coordinator, Pruitt's defenses frequently ranked in the top 10 nationally in total defense and related categories. Pruitt worked for Alabama as Director of Player Development from 2007 to 2009 before becoming the Crimson Tide's defensive backs coach in 2010. Prior to joining the college ranks, he served as an assistant coach at the high-school level. Pruitt was a 2013 finalist for the Broyles Award, given annually to the nation's top college football assistant coach, and was again a finalist in 2016. He played college football at Middle Tennessee and Alabama.

Pruitt appeared on the TV series Two-A-Days in 2006 while an assistant coach at Hoover High School in Hoover, Alabama. In January 2021, Pruitt was fired from Tennessee for cause, as a result of significant recruiting violations. He was replaced by Josh Heupel.

== Early life and playing career ==
Pruitt was born in Rainsville, Alabama, the son of Dale and Melissa Pruitt. His father is a long-time high school head coach, with stints at Pisgah (1982–1983), Plainview (1984–2000, 2006–2014, 2022–present), Ft. Payne (2001–2003), Marion County (Tenn.) (2004–2005, 2020–2021), Albertville (2015–2018), and Dade County (2019). Jeremy played for his father at Plainview, where he was named all-state in 1991 and 1992, and helped the team achieve a 48–8 record.

Pruitt began his college football career at Middle Tennessee State under Hall of Fame head coach Boots Donnelly. He was recruited as a quarterback, but switched to defensive back during his freshman season. After his sophomore year, he transferred to the University of Alabama, where he played under coach Gene Stallings. He saw action in nine games during his junior season as a member of the 1995 Alabama squad, and seven games during his senior season as a member of the Outback Bowl-winning 1996 squad. As a player, Pruitt helped mentor All-American teammate Kevin Jackson in defensive coordinator Bill Oliver's complex schemes.

== Coaching career ==
=== Alabama ===
Pruitt began coaching as a student assistant on the 1997 Alabama team, where he worked primarily under defensive backs coach Curley Hallman.

=== Plainview HS and Fort Payne HS ===
Pruitt worked as an assistant coach under his father at Plainview High School in 1998 and 2000 and at Fort Payne from 2001 to 2003.

=== West Alabama ===
Pruitt coached defensive backs in 1999 at West Alabama, where he earned his degree.

=== Hoover HS ===
Pruitt served as an assistant coach under Rush Propst at Hoover High School from 2004 to 2006, winning state championships in 2004 and 2005. While at Hoover, he appeared on the first season of the MTV reality television show, Two-A-Days, which aired in the fall of 2006 and focused on the lives of students at Hoover.

=== Alabama (second stint) ===
In 2007, Pruitt joined the Alabama coaching staff as Director of Player Development. Following Alabama's 2009 national championship season, Pruitt was named the Tide's defensive backs coach. During his first season in 2010, Alabama's secondary led the SEC in passing efficiency, and included one All-American, Mark Barron. The 2011 Alabama secondary led the nation in pass defense and passing efficiency, and included three All-Americans, Barron, Dre Kirkpatrick, and DeQuan Menzie. Both Barron and Kirkpatrick were drafted in the first round of the 2012 NFL draft. Pruitt's 2012 secondary ranked seventh nationally in pass defense, and included Jim Thorpe finalist Dee Milliner. He was named National Recruiter of the Year in 2012 by 247Sports.

=== Florida State ===
In 2013, Pruitt was hired as the defensive coordinator at Florida State. In his lone season with the Seminoles, his defense ranked number one in scoring defense, allowing just 12.1 points per game, and ranked third in total defense, helping the 2013 Seminoles win the national championship.

=== Georgia ===
In 2014, Pruitt joined the Georgia coaching staff as the defensive coordinator. His 2014 defensive unit finished 17th nationally in total defense, and finished in the top ten in turnover margin and passing yards allowed. Pruitt's 2015 unit at Georgia finished the season ranked seventh nationally in total defense, and led the nation in fewest passing yards allowed per game.

=== Alabama (third stint) ===
Pruitt returned to Alabama as defensive coordinator in 2016, replacing Kirby Smart, who had left to become the head coach at Georgia. His 2016 defensive unit led the nation in scoring defense and rushing defense, and was ranked second in total defense. His 2017 Alabama defensive unit finished the regular season ranked second in total defense and first in scoring defense. The unit was part of the team that won the National Championship in the 2017 season.

=== Tennessee ===
==== 2018 season ====
In December 2017, Pruitt was hired as the head coach at the University of Tennessee, capping a tumultuous coaching search that followed the firing of head coach Butch Jones, and led to the replacement of athletic director John Currie by Hall of Fame coach Phillip Fulmer. On September 1, 2018, he made his Tennessee head coaching debut in the Belk College Kickoff against the #17 West Virginia Mountaineers. The Volunteers lost by a score of 40–14. The next week, against ETSU, Pruitt won his first game as head coach. The Vols defeated the Buccaneers by a score of 59–3 in Pruitt's Neyland Stadium debut. After a 24–0 victory over UTEP, Tennessee suffered blowout losses to Florida and #2 Georgia. On October 13, against #21 Auburn, Pruitt coached the Volunteers to their first victory over a SEC West team since 2010. Following the Auburn game, Tennessee dropped back-to-back contests to #1 Alabama and South Carolina before getting a 14–3 victory over Charlotte on November 3. On November 10, he helped lead the Volunteers to a 24–7 victory over the #12 Kentucky Wildcats. Tennessee had two chances at bowl eligibility late in the season but dropped both, a 50–17 to Missouri and a 38–13 loss to Vanderbilt. Overall, in his first season as the Volunteers' head coach, Pruitt finished with a 5–7 overall record, 2–6 record in SEC play.

==== 2019 season ====
Tennessee added the #13 overall recruiting class for the 2019 cycle according to 247sports.com. The Volunteers opened the season with a 38–30 loss to Georgia State University. The loss was particularly devastating for Tennessee as it marked the program's first loss to a non-Power 5 program since 2008 and its first loss ever to a Sun Belt team. The next week saw the Vols drop a 29–26 result to BYU. The Vols started 0–2 for the first time since 1988. They earned their first win of the season against in-state opponent University of Tennessee at Chattanooga by a score of 45–0, which was the second shutout under Pruitt. Tennessee dropped to 1–4 with a 34–3 loss to #9 Florida and a 43–14 loss to #3 Georgia. The Volunteers earned their second win of the season against SEC opponent Mississippi State Bulldogs by a score of 20–10, giving the Volunteers their first SEC win for the 2019 season. The next week saw a 35–13 loss to #1 Alabama. After a 2–5 start to the season, Pruitt helped lead the Volunteers to a five-game winning streak to end the season at 7–5 and earn bowl eligibility. The win streak saw Tennessee get conference victories over South Carolina, Kentucky, Missouri, and Vanderbilt. In the 2020 Gator Bowl against Indiana, Pruitt earned his first bowl victory as head coach of Tennessee with a 23–22 comeback victory.

==== 2020 season ====
Due to the COVID-19 pandemic, Tennessee's 2020 season was cut to an All-SEC, ten-game season beginning on September 26. The Volunteers started the 2020 season ranked #16 in the AP Poll. The team got off to a 2–0 start with victories over South Carolina and Missouri. Tennessee rose to #14 in the AP Poll and faced off against #3 Georgia. Tennessee led 21–17 at the half before giving up 27 unanswered in the second half to fall 44–21. The next week marked a lowlight for the Tennessee program, suffering a home loss to Kentucky for the first time in 36 years. Tennessee gave up back-to-back pick sixes by Jarrett Guarantano in the second quarter to begin a 34–7 blowout. The 27-point loss marked the worst defeat in the series for Tennessee since Kentucky won 27–0 in 1935. Tennessee dropped their next four games before getting a 42–17 victory over Vanderbilt. The four-game losing streak saw Pruitt try to find answers to inconsistent quarterback play by constantly switching players out at the position. Tennessee shifted through four different quarterbacks towards the end of the season. Tennessee dropped the last game of the season, a 34–13 setback to #5 Texas A&M to finish 3–7. Partially due to the shortened-season, Tennessee's three victories marked the fewest for the program for a single season since 1924. Despite this, the NCAA had waived the five-win bowl eligibility requirement for the season, and the Volunteers accepted a bid to the Liberty Bowl. However, the team had to withdraw on December 21 after several players and coaches, including Pruitt, tested positive for COVID-19.

After the 2020 season, on January 18, 2021, Pruitt was fired after an internal investigation found evidence of recruiting violations. According to the termination letter Pruitt received from Fulmer and Tennessee chancellor Donde Plowman, Tennessee was notified of potentially serious NCAA violations shortly after the season. Pruitt met with the NCAA enforcement staff and Tennessee's lawyers on January 14. Plowman and Fulmer called Pruitt in for a meeting four days later to discuss evidence that two of Pruitt's assistants and several members of the recruiting staff committed recruiting violations that could have been prevented had Pruitt exercised adequate control over the program. On that basis, Plowman and Fulmer concluded that Pruitt breached at least five clauses of his contract. They told Pruitt that these breaches were egregious enough that they were "not capable of being cured," and justified firing him for cause. Nine other coaches and staff were also fired. At a press conference, Plowman said the investigation was still underway, but they had learned enough to demand that Pruitt be fired immediately. She said that she was stunned at "the number of violations and (the) efforts to conceal the wrongdoing."

=== New York Giants ===
On March 10, 2021, Pruitt was hired by the New York Giants as a senior defensive assistant under defensive coordinator Patrick Graham and head coach Joe Judge. He was not retained after the 2021 season ended.

=== Return to High School ===
On July 27, 2023, the DeKalb County School System announced that Pruitt had been hired as a physical education teacher at Plainview High School and would serve as a junior high boys' basketball coach.

== Scandal ==
In July 2022, the NCAA found that Pruitt, his wife and several members of his football staff provided about $60,000 of impermissible benefits and recruiting inducements to more than two dozen recruits and their families during his three years as head coach at Tennessee. As a result, on July 14, 2023, Pruitt was handed a six-year show-cause order for his role in providing impermissible benefits, effective until July 13, 2029. The NCAA harshly criticized Pruitt for failing to control the program, as well as for failing to cooperate with Tennessee and the NCAA enforcement staff during the investigation. If Pruitt is hired by another NCAA member school during this time, he will be suspended for the entire first season of his return. The NCAA also vacated all of Tennessee's wins for 2019 and 2020, officially making them the Vols' only winless seasons of modern times.

Pruitt sued the NCAA in July 2025, alleging negligence, wantonness, and interference with his business relationships. The case was filed in a state court in DeKalb County, Ala. In December 2025, a judge granted a preliminary injunction that blocked enforcement of the show-cause order, but the Alabama Supreme Court -- in an opinion issued Nov. 20, 2026 -- found that the DeKalb County Court did not have jurisdiction and dismissed the case.

== Personal life ==
Pruitt is married and has four children.

== Head coaching record ==
Year	Team	Overall	Conference	Standing	Bowl/playoffs
Tennessee Volunteers (Southeastern Conference) (2018–2020)
2018	Tennessee	5–7	2–6	7th (Eastern)	
2019	Tennessee	0–5*	0–3*	3rd (Eastern)	V* Gator
2020	Tennessee	0–7*	0–7*	5th (Eastern)	Liberty (Note: Tennessee dropped out of the Liberty Bowl due to a rise in positive COVID cases within the program and was replaced by Army.)
Tennessee:		5–19*	2–16*		
Total:		5–19*			

* The NCAA vacated all of Tennessee's wins from the 2019 and 2020 seasons after ruling that it used ineligible players. Records on the field were 8–5 (5–3) in 2019 and 3–7 in 2020.
