= 2019 All-Big Ten Conference football team =

The 2019 All-Big Ten Conference football team consists of American football players chosen as All-Big Ten Conference players for the 2019 Big Ten Conference football season. The conference recognizes two official All-Big Ten selectors: (1) the Big Ten conference coaches selected separate offensive and defensive units and named first-, second- and third-team players (the "Coaches" team); and (2) a panel of sports writers and broadcasters covering the Big Ten also selected offensive and defensive units and named first-, second- and third-team players (the "Media" team).

== Offensive selections ==
=== Quarterbacks ===
- Justin Fields, Ohio State (Coaches-1; Media-1)
- Tanner Morgan, Minnesota (Coaches-2; Media-2)
- Shea Patterson, Michigan (Coaches-3; Media-3)

=== Running backs ===
- J. K. Dobbins, Ohio State (Coaches-1; Media-1)
- Jonathan Taylor, Wisconsin (Coaches-1; Media-1)
- Stevie Scott III, Indiana (Coaches-2; Media-2)
- Rodney Smith, Minnesota (Coaches-2; Media-2)
- Master Teague, Ohio State (Coaches-3; Media-3)
- Zach Charbonnet, Michigan (Media-3)
- Elijah Collins, Michigan State (Media-3)
- Reggie Corbin, Illinois (Coaches-3)

=== Wide receivers ===
- Rashod Bateman, Minnesota (Coaches-1; Media-1)
- Tyler Johnson, Minnesota (Coaches-1; Media-1)
- K. J. Hamler, Penn State (Coaches-2; Media-2)
- David Bell, Purdue (Coaches-3; Media-2)
- Whop Philyor, Indiana (Coaches-2; Media-3)
- Chris Olave, Ohio State (Coaches-3; Media-3)

=== Centers ===
- Tyler Biadasz, Wisconsin (Coaches-1; Media-1)
- Josh Myers, Ohio State (Coaches-3; Media-2)
- Cesar Ruiz, Michigan (Coaches-2; Media-3)

=== Guards ===
- Ben Bredeson, Michigan (Coaches-1; Media-1)
- Wyatt Davis, Ohio State (Coaches-2; Media-1)
- Jonah Jackson, Ohio State (Coaches-1; Media-2)
- Steven Gonzalez, Penn State (Coaches-2; Media-2)
- Blaise Andries, Minnesota (Coaches-3; Media-3)
- Michael Onwenu, Michigan (Coaches-3)
- Simon Stepaniak, Indiana (Media-3)

=== Tackles ===
- Jon Runyan Jr., Michigan (Coaches-1; Media-1)
- Tristan Wirfs, Iowa (Coaches-1; Media-1)
- Thayer Munford, Ohio State (Coaches-2; Media-2)
- Branden Bowen, Ohio State (Coaches-2; Media-3)
- Cole Van Lanen, Wisconsin (Media-2)
- Alaric Jackson, Iowa (Coaches-3; Media-3)
- Alex Palczewski, Illinois (Coaches-3)

=== Tight ends ===
- Brycen Hopkins, Purdue (Coaches-1; Media-1)
- Pat Freiermuth, Penn State (Coaches-2; Media-2)
- Luke Farrell, Ohio State (Coaches-3)
- Peyton Hendershot, Indiana (Media-3)

== Defensive selections ==
=== Defensive linemen ===
- A. J. Epenesa, Iowa (Coaches-1; Media-1)
- Yetur Gross-Matos, Penn State (Coaches-1; Media-1)
- Chase Young, Ohio State (Coaches-1; Media-1)
- Joe Gaziano, Northwestern (Coaches-1; Media-2)
- Kenny Willekes, Michigan State (Coaches-2; Media-1)
- Carter Coughlin, Minnesota (Coaches-2; Media-2)
- Kwity Paye, Michigan (Coaches-2; Media-3)
- Raequan Williams, Michigan State (Coaches-3; Media-2)
- George Karlaftis, Purdue (Media-2)
- Shaka Toney, Penn State (Coaches-2)
- DaVon Hamilton, Ohio State (Coaches-3; Media-3)
- Oluwole Betiku Jr., Illinois (Media-3)
- Khalil Davis, Nebraska (Coaches-3)
- Aidan Hutchinson, Michigan (Media-3)
- Carlo Kemp, Michigan (Coaches-3)
- Robert Windsor, Penn State (Coaches-3)

=== Linebackers ===
- Zack Baun, Wisconsin (Coaches-1; Media-1)
- Micah Parsons, Penn State (Coaches-1; Media-1)
- Malik Harrison, Ohio State (Coaches-1; Media-2)
- Dele Harding, Illinois (Coaches-3; Media-1)
- Chris Orr, Wisconsin (Coaches-2; Media-2)
- Paddy Fisher, Northwestern (Coaches-3; Media-2)
- Khaleke Hudson, Michigan (Coaches-2; Media-3)
- Josh Uche, Michigan (Coaches-2; Media-3)
- Joe Bachie, Michigan State (Media-3)
- Cam Brown, Penn State (Coaches-3)

=== Defensive backs ===
- Jordan Fuller, Ohio State (Coaches-1; Media-1)
- Lavert Hill, Michigan (Coaches-1; Media-1)
- Antoine Winfield Jr., Minnesota (Coaches-1; Media-1)
- Jeff Okudah, Ohio State (Coaches-1; Media-1)
- Damon Arnette, Ohio State (Coaches-2; Media-2)
- Lamar Jackson, Nebraska (Coaches-2; Media-2)
- Antoine Brooks, Maryland (Coaches-2; Media-3)
- Michael Ojemudia, Iowa (Coaches-3; Media-2)
- Josiah Scott, Michigan State (Media-2)
- Geno Stone, Iowa (Coaches-2)
- Shaun Wade, Ohio State (Coaches-3; Media-3)
- Sydney Brown, Illinois (Coaches-3)
- Tariq Castro-Fields, (Media-3)
- Josh Metellus, Michigan (Media-3)
- Ambry Thomas, Michigan (Coaches-3)

== Special teams ==
=== Kickers ===
- Keith Duncan, Iowa (Coaches-1; Media-1)
- Logan Justus, Indiana (Coaches-2; Media-2)
- Blake Haubeil, Ohio State (Coaches-3; Media-3)

=== Punters ===
- Blake Hayes, Illinois (Coaches-1; Media-1)
- Will Hart, Michigan (Coaches-3; Media-2)
- Adam Korsak, Rutgers (Coaches-2; Media-3)

=== Return specialist ===
- Javon Leake, Maryland (Coaches-1; Media-1)
- Aron Cruickshank, Wisconsin (Coaches-2; Media-2)
- Dre Brown, Illinois (Coaches-3)
- Donovan Peoples-Jones, Michigan (Media-3)

== Key ==
Bold = Consensus first-team selection by both the coaches and media

Coaches = Selected by the Big Ten Conference coaches

Media = Selected by the conference media

== See also ==
- 2019 College Football All-America Team
