= 2019 Big Ten Conference football season =

- League: NCAA Division I Football Bowl Subdivision
- Sport: Football
- Duration: August 29, 2019 through January 2020
- Teams: 14
- TV partner(s): ABC, ESPN2, ESPN Inc., Big Ten Network, FOX, FS1

2020 NFL Draft
- Top draft pick: Chase Young (Ohio State)
- Picked by: Washington Redskins, 2nd overall

Regular season
- Season MVP: Chase Young, OSU
- East Division champions: Ohio State
- West Division champions: Wisconsin

Championship Game
- Champions: Ohio State
- Runners-up: Wisconsin
- Finals MVP: Justin Fields

Football seasons
- 2018 2020

2019 Big Ten Conference football standings
	Conf.			Overall
Team	W		L	W		L
East Division
No. 3 Ohio State xy$^	9	–	0	13	–	1
No. 9 Penn State	7	–	2	11	–	2
No. 18 Michigan	6	–	3	9	–	4
Indiana	5	–	4	8	–	5
Michigan State	4	–	5	7	–	6
Maryland	1	–	8	3	–	9
Rutgers	0	–	9	2	–	10
West Division
No. 11 Wisconsin xy	7	–	2	10	–	4
No. 10 Minnesota x	7	–	2	11	–	2
No. 15 Iowa	6	–	3	10	–	3
Illinois	4	–	5	6	–	7
Purdue	3	–	6	4	–	8
Nebraska	3	–	6	5	–	7
Northwestern	1	–	8	3	–	9
Championship: Ohio State 34, Wisconsin 21
^ – College Football Playoff participant; $ – Conference champion; x – Division champion/co-champions; y – Championship game participant; Rankings from AP Poll

The 2019 Big Ten conference football season was the 124th season of college football play for the Big Ten Conference and was part of the 2019 NCAA Division I FBS football season.

This was the Big Ten's sixth season with 14 teams. The defending league champion was Ohio State. The 2019 season consisted of a nine-game conference schedule for the fourth year in a row.

The Big Ten had two new coaches for the 2019 season. Ohio State promoted offensive coordinator Ryan Day to head coach, replacing Urban Meyer who retired at the end of the 2018 season. Maryland also had a new coach for 2019, hiring Mike Locksley to replace D. J. Durkin, who was fired in 2018 ultimately due to the events that led to the death of player Jordan McNair.

The first coaching change during the 2019 season came on September 29, 2019 when Rutgers dismissed Chris Ash. Tight ends coach Nunzio Campanile served as interim coach for the remainder of the 2019 season. Then on December 1, Rutgers announced that former coach Greg Schiano would return to coach the team in 2020.

On the field of play, Ohio State won the East Division title and made their fifth appearance in the Big Ten Football Championship Game and third consecutive appearance. In the West Division, Wisconsin and Minnesota tied for the division title, but the Badgers represented the division in the conference title game due to their head-to-head win over the Golden Gophers. Wisconsin made their sixth appearance in the conference title game overall. In that championship game, Ohio State defeated Wisconsin 34-21 to win their third consecutive Big Ten championship. With that win, the Buckeyes landed a spot in the 2019-20 College Football Playoff as the #2 seed.

== Preseason ==
2019 Big Ten Spring Football and number of signees on signing day:

=== Recruiting classes ===
Rankings
Team	ESPN	Rivals	Scout & 24/7	Signees
Illinois	52	73	52	13
Indiana	38	38	36	21
Iowa	37	41	41	23
Maryland	44	61	47	18
Michigan	8	10	8	26
Michigan State	28	32	33	21
Minnesota	39	41	45	24
Nebraska	18	15	17	27
Northwestern	43	49	51	19
Ohio State	16	21	14	18
Penn State	13	11	12	23
Purdue	25	26	25	24
Rutgers	66	53	65	22
Wisconsin	29	27	29	19

=== Big Ten Media Days ===
The Big Ten conducted its annual media days at the Chicago Marriott Downtown Chicago Magnificent Mile in Chicago, IL on July 23–24. The event commenced with a speech by Big Ten commissioner Jim Delany, and all 14 teams sent their head coaches and two selected players to speak with members of the media. The event along with all speakers and interviews were broadcast live on the Big Ten Network. The teams and representatives in respective order were as follows:

==== Preseason media polls ====
The Big Ten Media Days concluded with its annual preseason media polls in early August. Since 1992, the credentialed media has gotten the preseason champion correct just five times. Only eight times has the preseason pick even made it to the Big Ten title game. Below are the results of the media poll with total points received next to each school and first-place votes in parentheses. For the 2019 poll, Michigan was voted as the favorite to win both the East Division and the Big Ten Championship Game.

East
Predicted finish	Team	Votes (1st place)
1	Michigan	222 (20)
2	Ohio State	214 (14)
3	Michigan State	156
4	Penn State	154
5	Indiana	86.5
6	Maryland	82.5
7	Rutgers	37

West
Predicted finish	Team	Votes (1st place)
1	Nebraska	198 (14)
2	Iowa	194.5 (14)
3	Wisconsin	172.5 (4)
4	Northwestern	142.5 (1)
5	Purdue	110.5
6	Minnesota	100 (1)
7	Illinois	34

Media poll (Big Ten Championship)
Rank	Team	Votes
1	Michigan over Nebraska	8
2	Michigan over Iowa	8
3	Ohio State over Iowa	6
4	Ohio State over Nebraska	4
5	Ohio State over Wisconsin	3
6	Nebraska over Michigan	2
7	Michigan over Wisconsin	1
8	Ohio State over Minnesota	1
9	Northwestern over Michigan	1

=== Preseason All-Big Ten ===
East Division

- Joe Bachie, Sr., LB, Michigan State
- Kenny Willekes, Sr., DE, Michigan State
- J. K. Dobbins, Jr., RB, Ohio State
- Chase Young, Jr., DE, Ohio State
- Yetur Gross-Matos, Jr., DE, Penn State

West Division

- A. J. Epenesa, Jr., DE, Iowa
- Adrian Martinez, So., QB, Nebraska
- Paddy Fisher, Jr., LB, Northwestern
- Rondale Moore, So., WR, Purdue
- Jonathan Taylor, Jr., RB, Wisconsin

== Rankings ==
		Pre	Wk 1	Wk 2	Wk 3	Wk 4	Wk 5	Wk 6	Wk 7	Wk 8	Wk 9	Wk 10	Wk 11	Wk 12	Wk 13	Wk 14	Wk 15	Final
Illinois	AP												RV	RV				
Illinois	C																	
Illinois	CFP	Not released																
Indiana	AP										RV	RV	24	RV				
Indiana	C									RV	RV	RV	25	RV	RV	RV	RV	
Indiana	CFP	Not released																
Iowa	AP	20	20	19	18	14	14	17	23	20	19	18	23	19	19	18	19	15
Iowa	C	19	19	18	18	14	14	18	22	19	19	18	22	20	20	19	19	15
Iowa	CFP	Not released										18	20	17	17	16	16	
Maryland	AP			21														
Maryland	C			25														
Maryland	CFP	Not released																
Michigan	AP	7	7	10	11	20	19	16	16	19	14	14	14	12	10	17	17	18
Michigan	C	7	7	10	10	20	18	16	16	20	15	14	14	12	11	18	17	19
Michigan	CFP	Not released										14	15	13	13	14	14	
Michigan State	AP	18	19	18	RV	25	25-T	RV										
Michigan State	C	20	20	19	RV	RV	23-T	RV										
Michigan State	CFP	Not released																
Minnesota	AP	RV	RV	RV	RV	RV	RV	RV	20	17	13	13	7	11	9	15	16	10
Minnesota	C	RV	RV	RV	RV	RV	RV	25	20	16	13	13	7	11	9	15	16	10
Minnesota	CFP	Not released										17	8	10	8	18	18	
Nebraska	AP	24	25-T															
Nebraska	C	RV	25	RV	RV	RV												
Nebraska	CFP	Not released																
Northwestern	AP	RV																
Northwestern	C	25	RV															
Northwestern	CFP	Not released																
Ohio State	AP	5	5	6	6	5	4	3-T (10)	4 (9)	3 (13)	3 (17)	3 (17)	2 (5)	2 (5)	2 (9)	2 (19)	2 (12)	3
Ohio State	C	5	5	6	6	6	5	4 (3)	4 (4)	4 (8)	4 (8)	4 (8)	2 (5)	2 (6)	2 (7)	2 (17)	2 (14)	3
Ohio State	CFP	Not released										1	2	2	1	1	2	
Penn State	AP	15	15	13	13-T	12	12	10	7	6	5	5	9	9	12	12	13	9
Penn State	C	14	14	11	12	11	11	9	7	6	5	5	11	9	12	11	12	9
Penn State	CFP	Not released										4	9	8	10	10	10	
Purdue	AP																	
Purdue	C																	
Purdue	CFP	Not released																
Rutgers	AP																	
Rutgers	C																	
Rutgers	CFP	Not released																
Wisconsin	AP	19	17	14	13-T	8	8	8	6	13	18	16	15	14	13	10	11	11
Wisconsin	C	17-T	16	14	14	9	9	8	6	13	17	16	15	14	14	10	11	13
Wisconsin	CFP	Not released										13	14	12	12	8	8	

Legend
	Improvement in ranking
	Drop in ranking
	Not ranked previous week
	No change in ranking from previous week
RV	Received votes but were not ranked in Top 25 of poll
т	Tied with team above or below also with this symbol

== Schedule ==
Index to colors and formatting
Big Ten member won
Big Ten member lost
Big Ten teams in **bold**

All times Eastern time.

† denotes Homecoming game

== Regular season ==
The Regular season will begin on August 29 and will end on November 30.

=== Week #1 ===
Date	Time	Visiting team	Home team	Site	TV	Result	Attendance	Ref.
August 29	9:00 p.m.	South Dakota State	**Minnesota**	TCF Bank Stadium • Minneapolis, MN	FS1	**W** 28–21	49,112	
August 30	7:00 p.m.	Tulsa	No. 18 **Michigan State**	Spartan Stadium • East Lansing, MI	FS1	**W** 28–7	72,005	
August 30	7:00 p.m.	No. 19 **Wisconsin**	South Florida	Raymond James Stadium • Tampa, FL	ESPN	**W** 49–0	46,704	
August 30	7:15 p.m.	Massachusetts	**Rutgers**	HighPoint.com Stadium • Piscataway, NJ	BTN	**W** 48–21	40,515	
August 30	9:30 p.m.	**Purdue**	Nevada	Mackay Stadium • Reno, NV	CBSSN	**L** 31–34	20,144	
August 31	12:00 p.m.	Akron	**Illinois**	Memorial Stadium • Champaign, IL	BTN	**W** 42–3	30,654	
August 31	12:00 p.m.	Howard	**Maryland**	Maryland Stadium • College Park, MD	BTN	**W** 79–0	32,761	
August 31	12:00 p.m.	Ball State	**Indiana**	Lucas Oil Stadium • Indianapolis, IN	CBSSN	**W** 34–24	21,437	
August 31	12:00 p.m.	Florida Atlantic	No. 5 **Ohio State**	Ohio Stadium • Columbus, OH	FOX	**W** 45–21	103,228	
August 31	12:00 p.m.	South Alabama	No. 24 **Nebraska**	Memorial Stadium • Lincoln, NE	ESPN	**W** 35–21	89,502	
August 31	3:30 p.m.	Idaho	No. 15 **Penn State**	Beaver Stadium • University Park, PA	BTN	**W** 79–7	104,527	
August 31	4:00 p.m.	**Northwestern**	No. 25 Stanford	Stanford Stadium • Stanford, CA	FOX	**L** 7–17	37,179	
August 31	7:30 p.m.	Miami (OH)	No. 20 **Iowa**	Kinnick Stadium • Iowa City, IA	FS1	**W** 38–14	69,250	
August 31	7:30 p.m.	Middle Tennessee State	No. 7 **Michigan**	Michigan Stadium • Ann Arbor, MI	BTN	**W** 40–21	110,811	
^{#}Rankings from AP Poll released prior to game. All times are in Eastern Time.

=== Week #2 ===
Date	Time	Visiting team	Home team	Site	TV	Result	Attendance	Ref.
September 7	12:00 p.m.	**Rutgers**	No. 20 **Iowa**	Kinnick Stadium • Iowa City, IA	FS1	**IA** 30–0	61,808	
September 7	12:00 p.m.	Army	No. 7 **Michigan**	Michigan Stadium • Ann Arbor, MI	FOX	**W** 24–21 ^{2OT}	111,747	
September 7	12:00 p.m.	No. 21 Syracuse	**Maryland**	Maryland Stadium • College Park, MD	ESPN	**W** 63–20	33,493	
September 7	12:00 p.m.	Cincinnati	No. 5 **Ohio State**	Ohio Stadium • Columbus, OH	ABC	**W** 42–0	104,089	
September 7	12:00 p.m.	Vanderbilt	**Purdue**	Ross-Ade Stadium • West Lafayette, IN	BTN	**W** 42–24	50,506	
September 7	3:30 p.m.	Eastern Illinois	**Indiana**	Memorial Stadium • Bloomington, IN	BTN	**W** 52–0	37,784	
September 7	3:30 p.m.	Central Michigan	No. 17 **Wisconsin**	Camp Randall Stadium • Madison, WI	BTN	**W** 61–0	74,437	
September 7	3:30 p.m.	No. 25t **Nebraska**	Colorado	Folsom Field • Boulder, CO (CU-NU Rivalry)	FOX	**L** 31–34 ^{OT}	52,829	
September 7	3:30 p.m.	**Illinois**	Connecticut	Rentschler Field • East Hartford, CT	CBSSN	**W** 31–23	23,108	
September 7	7:30 p.m.	Western Michigan	No. 19 **Michigan State**	Spartan Stadium • East Lansing, MI	BTN	**W** 51–17	73,113	
September 7	7:30 p.m.	Buffalo	No. 15 **Penn State**	Beaver Stadium • University Park, PA	FOX	**W** 45–13	104,136	
September 7	10:30 p.m.	**Minnesota**	Fresno State	Bulldog Stadium • Fresno, CA	CBSSN	**W** 38–35 ^{2OT}	34,790	
^{#}Rankings from AP Poll released prior to game. All times are in Eastern Time.

Date	Bye Week
September 7	Northwestern

=== Week #3 ===
Date	Time	Visiting team	Home team	Site	TV	Result	Attendance	Ref.
September 14	12:00 p.m.	Eastern Michigan	**Illinois**	Memorial Stadium • Champaign, IL	BTN	**L** 31–34	34,759	
September 14	12:00 p.m.	No. 6 **Ohio State**	**Indiana**	Memorial Stadium • Bloomington, IN	FOX	**OSU** 51–10	47,945	
September 14	12:00 p.m.	Pittsburgh	No. 13 **Penn State**	Beaver Stadium • University Park, PA (rivalry)	ABC	**W** 17–10	108,661	
September 14	12:00 p.m.	No. 21 **Maryland**	Temple	Lincoln Financial Field • Philadelphia, PA	CBSSN	**L** 17–20	30,610	
September 14	3:30 p.m.	Georgia Southern	**Minnesota**	TCF Bank Stadium • Minneapolis, MN	BTN	**W** 35–32	41,021	
September 14	3:30 p.m.	UNLV	**Northwestern**	Ryan Field • Evanston, IL	BTN	**W** 30–14	37,714	
September 14	4:00 p.m.	No. 19 **Iowa**	Iowa State	Jack Trice Stadium • Ames, IA (rivalry)	FS1	**W** 18–17	61,500	
September 14	4:00 p.m.	Arizona State	No. 18 **Michigan State**	Spartan Stadium • East Lansing, MI	FOX	**L** 7–10	73,531	
September 14	7:30 p.m.	TCU	**Purdue**	Ross-Ade Stadium • West Lafayette, IN	BTN	**L** 13–34	60,037	
September 14	8:00 p.m.	Northern Illinois	**Nebraska**	Memorial Stadium • Lincoln, NE	FS1	**W** 44–8	89,593	
^{#}Rankings from AP Poll released prior to game. All times are in Eastern Time.

Date	Bye Week		
September 14	No. 10 Michigan	Rutgers	No. 14 Wisconsin

=== Week #4 ===
Date	Time	Visiting team	Home team	Site	TV	Result	Attendance	Ref.
September 21	12:00 p.m.	No. 11 **Michigan**	No. 13t **Wisconsin**	Camp Randall Stadium • Madison, WI	FOX	**WIS** 35–14	80,245	
September 21	12:00 p.m.	Connecticut	**Indiana**	Memorial Stadium • Bloomington, IN	BTN	**W** 38–3	40,084	
September 21	12:00 p.m.	**Michigan State**	**Northwestern**	Ryan Field • Evanston, IL	ABC	**MSU** 31–10	40,114	
September 21	12:00 p.m.	Boston College	**Rutgers**	HighPoint.com Stadium • Piscataway, NJ	BTN	**L** 16–30	32,217	
September 21	3:30 p.m.	Miami (OH)	No. 6 **Ohio State**	Ohio Stadium • Columbus, OH	BTN	**W** 76–5	103,190	
September 21	8:00 p.m.	**Nebraska**	**Illinois**	Memorial Stadium • Champaign, IL	BTN	**NEB** 42–38	44,512	
^{#}Rankings from AP Poll released prior to game. All times are in Eastern Time.

Date	Bye Week				
September 21	No. 18 Iowa	Maryland	Minnesota	No. 13t Penn State	Purdue

=== Week #5 ===
Date	Time	Visiting team	Home team	Site	TV	Result	Attendance	Ref.
September 27	8:00 p.m.	No. 12 **Penn State**	**Maryland**	Maryland Stadium • College Park, MD (MD-PSU Rivalry)	FS1	**PSU** 59–0	53,228	
September 28	12:00 p.m.	**Northwestern**	No. 8 **Wisconsin**	Camp Randall Stadium • Madison, WI	ABC	**WIS** 24–15	76,825	
September 28	12:00 p.m.	**Rutgers**	No. 20 **Michigan**	Michigan Stadium • Ann Arbor, MI	BTN	**MICH** 52–0	110,662	
September 28	12:00 p.m.	Middle Tennessee State	No. 14 **Iowa**	Kinnick Stadium • Iowa City, IA	ESPN2	**W** 48–3	63,706	
September 28†	3:30 p.m.	**Indiana**	No. 25 **Michigan State**	Spartan Stadium • East Lansing, MI (Old Brass Spittoon)	BTN	**MSU** 40–31	71,048	
September 28	3:30 p.m.	**Minnesota**	**Purdue**	Ross-Ade Stadium • West Lafayette, IN	ESPN2	**MIN** 38–31	50,629	
September 28	7:30 p.m.	No. 5 **Ohio State**	**Nebraska**	Memorial Stadium • Lincoln, NE	ABC	**OSU** 48–7	89,759	
^{†}Homecoming. ^{#}Rankings from AP Poll released prior to game. All times are in Eastern Time.

Date	Bye Week
September 28	Illinois

=== Week #6 ===
Date	Time	Visiting team	Home team	Site	TV	Result	Attendance	Ref.
October 5†	12:00 p.m.	**Purdue**	No. 12 **Penn State**	Beaver Stadium • University Park, PA	ESPN	**PSU** 35–7	106,536	
October 5	12:00 p.m.	Kent State	No. 8 **Wisconsin**	Camp Randall Stadium • Madison, WI	ESPNU	**W** 48–0	74,559	
October 5†	12:00 p.m.	No. 14 **Iowa**	No. 19 **Michigan**	Michigan Stadium • Ann Arbor, MI	FOX	**MI** 10–3	111,519	
October 5	12:00 p.m.	**Maryland**	**Rutgers**	HighPoint.com Stadium • Piscataway, NJ	BTN	**MD** 48–7	30,185	
October 5†	3:30 p.m.	**Illinois**	**Minnesota**	TCF Bank Stadium • Minneapolis, MN	BTN	**MINN** 40–17	39,341	
October 5†	4:00 p.m.	**Northwestern**	**Nebraska**	Memorial Stadium • Lincoln, NE	FOX	**NEB** 13–10	89,384	
October 5†	7:30 p.m.	No. 25-T **Michigan State**	No. 4 **Ohio State**	Ohio Stadium • Columbus, OH	ABC	**OSU** 34–10	104,797	
^{†}Homecoming. ^{#}Rankings from AP Poll released prior to game. All times are in Eastern Time.

Date	Bye Week
October 5	Indiana

=== Week #7 ===
Date	Time	Visiting team	Home team	Site	TV	Result	Attendance	Ref.
October 12†	12:00 p.m.	**Rutgers**	**Indiana**	Memorial Stadium • Bloomington, IN	BTN	**IND** 35–0	37,055	
October 12	12:00 p.m.	No. 16 **Michigan**	**Illinois**	Memorial Stadium • Champaign, IL	ABC	**MICH** 42–25	37,275	
October 12†	12:00 p.m.	**Maryland**	**Purdue**	Ross-Ade Stadium • West Lafayette, IN	BTN	**PUR** 40–14	52,296	
October 12†	3:30 p.m.	**Michigan State**	No. 8 **Wisconsin**	Camp Randall Stadium • Madison, WI	BTN	**WIS** 38–0	80,470	
October 12	7:30 p.m.	No. 10 **Penn State**	No. 17 **Iowa**	Kinnick Stadium • Iowa City, IA	ABC	**PSU** 17–12	69,034	
October 12	7:30 p.m.	**Nebraska**	**Minnesota**	TCF Bank Stadium • Minneapolis, MN (MN-NEB Rivalry)	FS1	**MIN** 34–7	43,502	
^{†}Homecoming. ^{#}Rankings from AP Poll released prior to game. All times are in Eastern Time.

Date	Bye Week	
October 12	Northwestern	No. 3t Ohio State

=== Week #8 ===
Date	Time	Visiting team	Home team	Site	TV	Result	Attendance	Ref.
October 18	8:30 p.m.	No. 4 **Ohio State**	**Northwestern**	Ryan Field • Evanston, IL	BTN	**OSU** 52–3	47,330	
October 19†	12:00 p.m.	No. 6 **Wisconsin**	**Illinois**	Memorial Stadium • Champaign, IL	BTN	**ILL** 24–23	37,363	
October 19†	12:00 p.m.	**Purdue**	No. 23 **Iowa**	Kinnick Stadium • Iowa City, IA	ESPN2	**IA** 26–20	69,250	
October 19	3:30 p.m.	**Indiana**	**Maryland**	Maryland Stadium • College Park, MD	BTN	**IND** 34–28	32,606	
October 19†	3:30 p.m.	No. 20 **Minnesota**	**Rutgers**	HighPoint.com Stadium • Piscataway, NJ	BTN	**MIN** 42–7	26,429	
October 19	7:30 p.m.	No. 16 **Michigan**	No. 7 **Penn State**	Beaver Stadium • University Park, PA	ABC	**PSU** 28–21	110,669	
^{†}Homecoming. ^{#}Rankings from AP Poll released prior to game. All times are in Eastern Time.

Date	Bye Week	
October 19	Michigan State	Nebraska

=== Week #9 ===
Date	Time	Visiting team	Home team	Site	TV	Result	Attendance	Ref.
October 26†	12:00 p.m.	No. 20 **Iowa**	**Northwestern**	Ryan Field • Evanston, IL	ESPN2	**IA** 20–0	42,104	
October 26	12:00 p.m.	**Illinois**	**Purdue**	Ross-Ade Stadium • West Lafayette, IN (Purdue Cannon)	BTN	**ILL** 24–6	58,735	
October 26	12:00 p.m.	Liberty	**Rutgers**	HighPoint.com Stadium • Piscataway, NJ	BTN	**W** 44–34	23,058	
October 26	12:00 p.m.	No. 13 **Wisconsin**	No. 3 **Ohio State**	Ohio Stadium • Columbus, OH	FOX	**OSU** 38–7	102,998	
October 26	3:30 p.m.	**Maryland**	No. 17 **Minnesota**	TCF Bank Stadium • Minneapolis, MN	ESPN	**MIN** 52–10	44,715	
October 26	3:30 p.m.	**Indiana**	**Nebraska**	Memorial Stadium • Lincoln, NE	BTN	**IND** 38–31	89,317	
October 26	3:30 p.m.	No. 6 **Penn State**	**Michigan State**	Spartan Stadium • East Lansing, MI (Land Grant Trophy)	ABC	**PSU** 28–7	70,298	
October 26	7:30 p.m.	No. 8 Notre Dame	No. 19 **Michigan**	Michigan Stadium • Ann Arbor, MI (UM-ND Rivalry)	ABC	**W** 45–14	111,909	
^{†}Homecoming. ^{#}Rankings from AP Poll released prior to game. All times are in Eastern Time.

=== Week #10 ===
Date	Time	Visiting team	Home team	Site	TV	Result	Attendance	Ref.
November 2†	12:00 p.m.	No. 14 **Michigan**	**Maryland**	Maryland Stadium • College Park, MD	ABC	**MICH** 38–7	40,701	
November 2	12:00 p.m.	**Nebraska**	**Purdue**	Ross-Ade Stadium • West Lafayette, IN	FOX	**PUR** 31–27	50,606	
November 2	3:30 p.m.	**Rutgers**	**Illinois**	Memorial Stadium • Champaign, IL	BTN	**ILL** 38–10	35,652	
November 2	7:00 p.m.	**Northwestern**	**Indiana**	Memorial Stadium • Bloomington, IN	FS1	**IU** 34–3	40,924	
^{†}Homecoming. ^{#}Rankings from AP Poll released prior to game. All times are in Eastern Time.

Date	Bye Week					
November 2	No. 19 Iowa	Michigan State	No. 13 Minnesota	No. 3 Ohio State	No. 5 Penn State	No. 18 Wisconsin

=== Week #11 ===
Date	Time	Visiting team	Home team	Site	TV	Result	Attendance	Ref.
November 9	12:00 p.m.	**Purdue**	**Northwestern**	Ryan Field • Evanston, IL	BTN	**PUR** 24–22	37,194	
November 9	12:00 p.m.	**Maryland**	No. 3 **Ohio State**	Ohio Stadium • Columbus, OH	FOX	**OSU** 73–14	101,022	
November 9	12:00 p.m.	No. 5 **Penn State**	No. 13 **Minnesota**	TCF Bank Stadium • Minneapolis, MN (Governor's Victory Bell)	ABC	**MIN** 31–26	51,883	
November 9	3:30 p.m.	**Illinois**	**Michigan State**	Spartan Stadium • East Lansing, MI	FS1	**ILL** 37–34	63,370	
November 9	4:00 p.m.	No. 18 **Iowa**	No. 16 **Wisconsin**	Camp Randall Stadium • Madison, WI (Heartland Trophy)	FOX	**WIS** 24–22	78,018	
^{#}Rankings from AP Poll released prior to game. All times are in Eastern Time.

Date	Bye Week			
November 9	Indiana	No. 14 Michigan	Nebraska	Rutgers

=== Week #12 ===
Date	Time	Visiting team	Home team	Site	TV	Result	Attendance	Ref.
November 16	12:00 p.m.	Massachusetts	**Northwestern**	Ryan Field • Evanston, IL	BTN	**W** 45–6	29,447	
November 16	12:00 p.m.	**Michigan State**	No. 14 **Michigan**	Michigan Stadium • Ann Arbor, MI (Paul Bunyan Trophy)	FOX	**MICH** 44–10	111,496	
November 16	12:00 p.m.	No. 15 **Wisconsin**	**Nebraska**	Memorial Stadium • Lincoln, NE (Freedom Trophy)	BTN	**WIS** 37–21	88,842	
November 16	12:00 p.m.	No. 24 **Indiana**	No. 9 **Penn State**	Beaver Stadium • University Park, PA	ABC	**PSU** 34–27	106,323	
November 16	3:30 p.m.	No. 2 **Ohio State**	**Rutgers**	HighPoint.com Stadium • Piscataway, NJ	BTN	**OSU** 56–21	33,528	
November 16	4:00 p.m.	No. 7 **Minnesota**	No. 23 **Iowa**	Kinnick Stadium • Iowa City, IA (Floyd of Rosedale)	FOX	**IA** 23–19	67,518	
^{#}Rankings from AP Poll released prior to game. All times are in Eastern Time.

Date	Bye Week		
November 16	Illinois	Maryland	Purdue

=== Week #13 ===
Date	Time	Visiting team	Home team	Site	TV	Result	Attendance	Ref.
November 23	12:00 p.m.	No. 9 **Penn State**	No. 2 **Ohio State**	Ohio Stadium • Columbus, OH (rivalry)	FOX	**OSU** 28–17	104,355	
November 23	12:00 p.m.	**Illinois**	No. 19 **Iowa**	Kinnick Stadium • Iowa City, IA	BTN	**IA** 19–10	58,331	
November 23	12:00 p.m.	**Michigan State**	**Rutgers**	HighPoint.com Stadium • Piscataway, NJ	FS1	**MSU** 27–0	24,641	
November 23	12:00 p.m.	No. 11 **Minnesota**	**Northwestern**	Ryan Field • Evanston, IL	ABC	**MN** 38–22	30,246	
November 23	3:30 p.m.	No. 12 **Michigan**	**Indiana**	Memorial Stadium • Bloomington, IN	ESPN	**MICH** 39–14	43,671	
November 23	3:30 p.m.	**Nebraska**	**Maryland**	Maryland Stadium • College Park, MD	BTN	**NEB** 54–7	34,082	
November 23	4:00 p.m.	**Purdue**	No. 14 **Wisconsin**	Camp Randall Stadium • Madison, WI	FOX	**WIS** 45–24	70,747	
^{#}Rankings from AP Poll released prior to game. All times are in Eastern Time.

=== Week #14 ===
Date	Time	Visiting team	Home team	Site	TV	Result	Attendance	Ref.
November 29	2:30 p.m.	No. 19 **Iowa**	**Nebraska**	Memorial Stadium • Lincoln, NE (Heroes Trophy)	BTN	**IA** 27–24	89,039	
November 30	12:00 p.m.	No. 2 **Ohio State**	No. 10 **Michigan**	Michigan Stadium • Ann Arbor, MI (The Game)	FOX	**OSU** 56–27	112,071	
November 30	12:00 p.m.	**Northwestern**	**Illinois**	Memorial Stadium • Champaign, IL (Land of Lincoln Trophy)	BTN	**NW** 29–10	35,895	
November 30	12:00 p.m.	**Indiana**	**Purdue**	Ross-Ade Stadium • West Lafayette, IN (Old Oaken Bucket)	ESPN2	**IU** 44–41 ^{2OT}	55,338	
November 30	3:30 p.m.	**Maryland**	**Michigan State**	Spartan Stadium • East Lansing, MI	FS1	**MSU** 19–16	51,366	
November 30	3:30 p.m.	No. 13 **Wisconsin**	No. 9 **Minnesota**	TCF Bank Stadium • Minneapolis, MN (Paul Bunyan's Axe)	ABC	**WIS** 38–17	53,756	
November 30	3:30 p.m.	**Rutgers**	No. 12 **Penn State**	Beaver Stadium • University Park, PA	BTN	**PSU** 27–6	98,895	
^{#}Rankings from AP Poll released prior to game. All times are in Eastern Time.

=== Week #15 (Big Ten Championship Game) ===
Date	Time	Visiting team	Home team	Site	TV	Result	Attendance	Ref.
December 7	8:00 p.m.	No. 2 Ohio State	No. 10 Wisconsin	Lucas Oil Stadium • Indianapolis, IN	FOX	**OSU** 34–21	66,649	
^{#}Rankings from AP Poll released prior to game. All times are in Eastern Time.

== Postseason ==
=== Bowl games ===
Legend
Big Ten win
Big Ten loss

Bowl game	Date	Site	Television	Time (EST)	Big Ten team	Opponent	Score	Attendance	Ref.
Pinstripe Bowl	December 27	Yankee Stadium • New York, NY	ESPN	3:20 p.m.	Michigan State	Wake Forest	**W** 27–21	36,895	
Holiday Bowl	December 27	SDCCU Stadium • San Diego, CA	FS1	8:00 p.m.	#18 Iowa	#22 USC	**W** 49–24	50,123	
Redbox Bowl	December 30	Levi's Stadium • Santa Clara, CA	FOX	4:00 p.m.	Illinois	California	**L** 20–35	34,177	
Citrus Bowl	January 1	Camping World Stadium • Orlando, FL	ABC	1:00 p.m.	#17 Michigan	#9t Alabama	**L** 16–35	59,746	
Outback Bowl	January 1	Raymond James Stadium • Tampa, FL	ESPN	1:00 p.m.	#16 Minnesota	#9t Auburn	**W** 31–24	45,652	
Gator Bowl	January 2	TIAA Bank Field • Jacksonville, FL	ESPN	7:00 p.m.	Indiana	Tennessee	**L** 22–23	61,789	
**New Year's Six Bowls**
Cotton Bowl	December 28	AT&T Stadium • Arlington, TX	ESPN	12:00 p.m.	#13 Penn State	#15 Memphis	**W** 53–39	54,828	
Rose Bowl	January 1	Rose Bowl Stadium • Pasadena, CA	ESPN	5:00 p.m.	#11 Wisconsin	#7 Oregon	**L** 27–28	90,462	
**College Football Playoff**
Fiesta Bowl (Semifinal)	December 28	State Farm Stadium • Glendale, AZ	ESPN	8:00 p.m.	#2 Ohio State	#3 Clemson	**L** 23–29	71,330	

Rankings are from CFP rankings. All times Eastern Time Zone. Big Ten teams shown in bold.

== Big Ten records vs Other Conferences ==
2019–2020 records against non-conference foes:

**Regular Season**

Power 5 Conferences	Record
ACC	2–1
Big 12	1–1
Pac-12	0–3
BYU/Notre Dame	1–0
SEC	1–0
Power 5 Total	5–5
Other FBS Conferences	Record
American	5–1
C-USA	3–0
Independents (Excluding BYU and Notre Dame)	4–0
MAC	9–1
Mountain West	2–1
Sun Belt	2–0
Other FBS Total	25–3
FCS Opponents	Record
Football Championship Subdivision	4–0
Total Non-Conference Record	34–8

**Post Season**

Power Conferences 5	Record
ACC	1–1
Big 12	0–0
Pac-12	1–2
BYU/Notre Dame	0–0
SEC	1–2
Power 5 Total	3–5
Other FBS Conferences	Record
American	1–0
C–USA	0–0
Independents (Excluding Notre Dame)	0–0
MAC	0–0
Mountain West	0–0
Sun Belt	0–0
Other FBS Total	1–0
Total Bowl Record	4-5

== Awards and honors ==
=== Player of the week honors ===
Week	Offensive			Defensive			Special Teams			Freshman		
Week	Player	Position	Team	Player	Position	Team	Player	Position	Team	Player	Position	Team
Week 1 (Sept. 2)	Jonathan Taylor	RB	WIS	Kenny Willekes	DE	MSU	Logan Justus	PK	IU	Michael Penix Jr.	QB	IU
Week 2 (Sept. 9)	Elijah Sindelar	QB	PUR	Antoine Winfield Jr.	DB	MIN	Drue Chrisman	P	OSU	Zach Charbonnet	RB	MICH
Week 3 (Sept. 16)	Tyler Johnson	WR	MIN	Joe Gaziano	DL	NW	Keith Duncan	K	IA	D. J. Johnson	DB	IA
Week 3 (Sept. 16)	J. K. Dobbins	RB	OSU	Joe Gaziano	DL	NW	Keith Duncan	K	IA	Drake Anderson	RB	NW
Week 4 (Sept. 23)	Jonathan Taylor (2)	RB	WIS	Joe Bachie	LB	MSU	Blake Hayes	P	ILL	Wan'Dale Robinson	WR	NEB
Week 5 (Sept. 30)	Tanner Morgan	QB	MIN	Chris Orr	LB	WIS	Jacob Herbers	P	MIN	Michael Penix Jr. (2)	QB	IU
Week 5 (Sept. 30)	Sean Clifford	QB	PSU	Chris Orr	LB	WIS	Jacob Herbers	P	MIN	Michael Penix Jr. (2)	QB	IU
Week 6 (Oct. 7)	Jonathan Taylor (3)	RB	WIS	Aidan Hutchinson	DL	MICH	Javon Leake	KR	MD	Wan'Dale Robinson (2)	WR	NEB
Week 7 (Oct. 14)	Jack Plummer	QB	PUR	Kamal Martin	LB	MIN	Blake Gillikin	P	PSU	David Bell	WR	PUR
Week 8 (Oct. 21)	K. J. Hamler	WR	PSU	Jake Hansen	LB	ILL	Casey O'Brien	Holder	MIN	David Bell (2)	WR	PUR
Week 9 (Oct. 28)	J. K. Dobbins (2)	RB	OSU	Chase Young	DE	OSU	Blake Gillikin (2)	P	PSU	Odafe Oweh	DE	PSU
Week 9 (Oct. 28)	J. K. Dobbins (2)	RB	OSU	Chase Young	DE	OSU	Blake Gillikin (2)	P	PSU	Johnny Langan	QB	RUT
Week 10 (Nov. 4)	Stevie Scott III	RB	IU	Dele Harding	LB	ILL	Javon Leake (2)	KR	MD	King Doerue	RB	PUR
Week 10 (Nov. 4)	Stevie Scott III	RB	IU	Dele Harding	LB	ILL	Giles Jackson	KR	MICH	King Doerue	RB	PUR
Week 11 (Nov. 11)	Josh Imatorbhebhe	WR	ILL	Sydney Brown	DB	ILL	J. D. Dellinger	K	PUR	David Bell (3)	WR	PUR
Week 11 (Nov. 11)	Tanner Morgan	QB	MIN	Antoine Winfield Jr. (2)	DB	MIN	J. D. Dellinger	K	PUR	David Bell (3)	WR	PUR
Week 12 (Nov. 18)	Shea Patterson	QB	MICH	A. J. Epenesa	DE	IA	Chris Bergin	LB	NW	Evan Hull	RB	NW
Week 12 (Nov. 18)	Jonathan Taylor (4)	RB	WIS	A. J. Epenesa	DE	IA	Aron Cruickshank	KR	WIS	Evan Hull	RB	NW
Week 13 (Nov. 25)	Shea Patterson (2)	QB	MICH	Chase Young (2)	DE	OSU	Keith Duncan (2)	K	IA	David Bell (4)	WR	PUR
Week 13 (Nov. 25)	J. K. Dobbins (3)	RB	OSU	Chase Young (2)	DE	OSU	Keith Duncan (2)	K	IA	David Bell (4)	WR	PUR
Week 14 (Dec. 2)	J. K. Dobbins (4)	RB	OSU	A. J. Epenesa (2)	DE	IA	Keith Duncan (3)	K	IA	Coco Azema	RB	NW

=== Big Ten Individual Awards ===
The following individuals won the conference's annual player and coach awards:

Award	Player	School
Graham-George Offensive Player of the Year	Justin Fields	Ohio State
Nagurski-Woodson Defensive Player of the Year	Chase Young	Ohio State
Thompson-Randle El Freshman of the Year	David Bell	Purdue
Griese-Brees Quarterback of the Year	Justin Fields	Ohio State
Richter-Howard Receiver of the Year	Rashod Bateman	Minnesota
Ameche-Dayne Running Back of the Year	Jonathan Taylor	Wisconsin
Kwalick-Clark Tight End of the Year	Brycen Hopkins	Purdue
Rimington-Pace Offensive Lineman of the Year	Tristan Wirfs	Iowa
Smith-Brown Defensive Lineman of the Year	Chase Young	Ohio State
Butkus-Fitzgerald Linebacker of the Year	Micah Parsons	Penn State
Tatum-Woodson Defensive Back of the Year	Antoine Winfield Jr.	Minnesota
Bakken-Andersen Kicker of the Year	Keith Duncan	Iowa
Eddleman-Fields Punter of the Year	Blake Hayes	Illinois
Rodgers-Dwight Return Specialist of the Year	Javon Leake	Maryland
Hayes-Schembechler Coach of the Year (coaches vote)	P. J. Fleck	Minnesota
Dave McClain Coach of the Year (media vote)	Ryan Day	Ohio State
Dungy-Thompson Humanitarian Award	J. J. Watt	Wisconsin
Ford-Kinnick Leadership Award	Doug Schlereth	Indiana

=== All-Conference Teams ===
2019 Big Ten All-Conference Teams and Awards

Position	Player	Team
**First Team Offense (Coaches)**
QB	Justin Fields	Ohio State
RB	J. K. Dobbins	Ohio State
RB	Jonathan Taylor	Wisconsin
WR	Rashod Bateman	Minnesota
WR	Tyler Johnson	Minnesota
TE	Brycen Hopkins	Purdue
C	Tyler Biadasz	Wisconsin
OG	Ben Bredeson	Michigan
OG	Jonah Jackson	Ohio State
OT	Jon Runyan Jr.	Michigan
OT	Tristan Wirfs	Iowa
**First Team Defense (Coaches)**
DL	A. J. Epenesa	Iowa
DL	Joe Gaziano	Northwestern
DL	Chase Young	Ohio State
DL	Yetur Gross-Matos	Penn State
LB	Malik Harrison	Ohio State
LB	Micah Parsons	Penn State
LB	Zack Baun	Wisconsin
DB	Lavert Hill	Michigan
DB	Antoine Winfield Jr.	Minnesota
DB	Jordan Fuller	Ohio State
DB	Jeff Okudah	Ohio State
**First Team Special Teams (Coaches)**
K	Keith Duncan	Iowa
P	Blake Hayes	Illinois
RS	Javon Leake	Maryland

Position	Player	Team
**Second Team Offense (Coaches)**
QB	Tanner Morgan	Minnesota
RB	Stevie Scott III	Indiana
RB	Rodney Smith	Minnesota
WR	Whop Philyor	Indiana
WR	K. J. Hamler	Penn State
TE	Pat Freiermuth	Penn State
C	Cesar Ruiz	Michigan
OG	Wyatt Davis	Ohio State
OG	Steven Gonzalez	Penn State
OT	Branden Bowen	Ohio State
OT	Thayer Munford	Ohio State
**Second Team Defense (Coaches)**
DL	Kwity Paye	Michigan
DL	Carter Coughlin	Minnesota
DL	Kenny Willekes	Michigan State
DL	Shaka Toney	Penn State
LB	Khaleke Hudson	Michigan
LB	Josh Uche	Michigan
LB	Chris Orr	Wisconsin
DB	Geno Stone	Iowa
DB	Antoine Brooks	Maryland
DB	Lamar Jackson	Nebraska
DB	Damon Arnette	Ohio State
**Second Team Special Teams (Coaches)**
K	Logan Justus	Indiana
P	Adam Korsak	Rutgers
RS	Aron Cruickshank	Wisconsin

Position	Player	Team
**Third Team Offense (Coaches)**
QB	Shea Patterson	Michigan
RB	Reggie Corbin	Illinois
RB	Master Teague	Ohio State
WR	Chris Olave	Ohio State
WR	David Bell	Purdue
TE	Luke Farrell	Ohio State
C	Josh Myers	Ohio State
OG	Michael Onwenu	Michigan
OG	Blaise Andries	Minnesota
OT	Alex Palczewski	Illinois
OT	Alaric Jackson	Iowa
**Third Team Defense (Coaches)**
DL	Carlo Kemp	Michigan
DL	Raequan Williams	Michigan State
DL	Khalil Davis	Nebraska
DL	DaVon Hamilton	Ohio State
DL	Robert Windsor	Penn State
LB	Dele Harding	Illinois
LB	Paddy Fisher	Northwestern
LB	Cam Brown	Penn State
DB	Sydney Brown	Illinois
DB	Michael Ojemudia	Iowa
DB	Ambry Thomas	Michigan
DB	Shaun Wade	Ohio State
**Third Team Special Teams (Coaches)**
K	Blake Haubeil	Ohio State
P	Will Hart	Michigan
RS	Dre Brown	Illinois

Coaches Honorable Mention: ILLINOIS: Kendrick Green, Jake Hansen, Doug Kramer; INDIANA: Peyton Hendershot, Caleb Jones, Micah McFadden, Tiawan Mullen, Simon Stepaniak, Haydon Whitehead; IOWA: Chauncey Golston, Cedrick Lattimore, Tyler Linderbaum, Ihmir Smith-Marsette, Nate Stanley, Kristian Welch; MARYLAND: Nick Cross, Dontay Demus Jr., Ayinde Eley, Keandre Jones, Javon Leake; MICHIGAN: Zach Charbonnet, Nico Collins, Nick Eubanks, Hassan Haskins, Aidan Hutchinson, Giles Jackson, Jalen Mayfield, Cameron McGrone, Sean McKeon, Josh Metellus, Donovan Peoples-Jones; MICHIGAN STATE: Joe Bachie, Elijah Collins, Jake Hartbarger, Mike Panasiuk, Josiah Scott, Antjuan Simmons, Cody White; MINNESOTA: Curtis Dunlap Jr., Coney Durr, Daniel Faalele, Kamal Martin, Conner Olson, Sam Renner, Sam Schlueter; NEBRASKA: Darrion Daniels, Brenden Jaimes, Dedrick Mills, JD Spielman; NORTHWESTERN: Blake Gallagher, Rashawn Slater, Travis Whillock; OHIO STATE: Tuf Borland, Baron Browning, Drue Chrisman, Jashon Cornell, K. J. Hill, Robert Landers, Pete Werner; PENN STATE: Tariq Castro-Fields, Sean Clifford, Will Fries, Blake Gillikin, K. J. Hamler, Jan Johnson, Michal Menet, Jake Pinegar, John Reid, Garrett Taylor, Lamont Wade; PURDUE: Derrick Barnes, J.D. Dellinger, Ben Holt, George Karlaftis, Matt McCann; RUTGERS: Tyshon Fogg; WISCONSIN: Logan Bruss, Eric Burrell, Quintez Cephus, Jake Ferguson, Matt Henningsen, Faion Hicks, Isaiahh Loudermilk, Cole Van Lanen.

Position	Player	Team
**First Team Offense (Media)**
QB	Justin Fields	Ohio State
RB	J. K. Dobbins	Ohio State
RB	Jonathan Taylor	Wisconsin
WR	Rashod Bateman	Minnesota
WR	Tyler Johnson	Minnesota
TE	Brycen Hopkins	Purdue
C	Tyler Biadasz	Wisconsin
OG	Ben Bredeson	Michigan
OG	Wyatt Davis	Ohio State
OT	Tristan Wirfs	Iowa
OT	Jon Runyan Jr.	Michigan
**First Team Defense (Media)**
DL	A. J. Epenesa	Iowa
DL	Kenny Willekes	Michigan State
DL	Chase Young	Ohio State
DL	Yetur Gross-Matos	Penn State
LB	Dele Harding	Illinois
LB	Micah Parsons	Penn State
LB	Zack Baun	Wisconsin
DB	Lavert Hill	Michigan
DB	Antoine Winfield Jr.	Minnesota
DB	Jordan Fuller	Ohio State
DB	Jeff Okudah	Ohio State
**First Team Special Teams (Media)**
K	Keith Duncan	Iowa
P	Blake Hayes	Illinois
RS	Javon Leake	Maryland

Position	Player	Team
**Second Team Offense (Media)**
QB	Tanner Morgan	Minnesota
RB	Stevie Scott III	Indiana
RB	Rodney Smith	Minnesota
WR	K. J. Hamler	Penn State
WR	David Bell	Purdue
TE	Pat Freiermuth	Penn State
C	Josh Myers	Ohio State
OG	Jonah Jackson	Ohio State
OG	Steven Gonzalez	Penn State
OT	Thayer Munford	Ohio State
OT	Cole Van Lanen	Wisconsin
**Second Team Defense (Media)**
DL	Raequan Williams	Michigan State
DL	Carter Coughlin	Minnesota
DL	Joe Gaziano	Northwestern
DL	George Karlaftis	Purdue
LB	Paddy Fisher	Northwestern
LB	Malik Harrison	Ohio State
LB	Chris Orr	Wisconsin
DB	Michael Ojemudia	Iowa
DB	Josiah Scott	Michigan State
DB	Lamar Jackson	Nebraska
DB	Damon Arnette	Ohio State
**Second Team Special Teams (Media)**
K	Logan Justus	Indiana
P	Will Hart	Michigan
RS	Aron Cruickshank	Wisconsin

Position	Player	Team
**Third Team Offense (Media)**
QB	Shea Patterson	Michigan
RB	Reggie Corbin	Illinois
RB	Zach Charbonnet	Michigan
RB	Elijah Collins	Michigan State
RB	Master Teague	Ohio State
WR	Whop Philyor	Indiana
WR	Chris Olave	Ohio State
TE	Peyton Hendershot	Indiana
C	Cesar Ruiz	Michigan
OG	Simon Stepaniak	Indiana
OG	Blaise Andries	Minnesota
OT	Alaric Jackson	Iowa
OT	Branden Bowen	Ohio State
**Third Team Defense (Media)**
DL	Oluwole Betiku Jr.	Illinois
DL	Aidan Hutchinson	Michigan
DL	Kwity Paye	Michigan
DL	DaVon Hamilton	Ohio State
LB	Khaleke Hudson	Michigan
LB	Josh Uche	Michigan
LB	Joe Bachie	Michigan State
DB	Antoine Brooks	Maryland
DB	Josh Metellus	Michigan
DB	Shaun Wade	Ohio State
DB	Tariq Castro-Fields	Penn State
**Third Team Special Teams (Media)**
K	Blake Haubeil	Ohio State
P	Adam Korsak	Rutgers
RS	Donovan Peoples-Jones	Michigan

Media Honorable Mention: ILLINOIS: Dre Brown, Sydney Brown, Kendrick Green, Stanley Green Jr., Jake Hansen, Nate Hobbs, Josh Imatorbhebhe, Doug Kramer, Jamal Milan, Alex Palczewski; INDIANA: Demarcus Elliott, Tiawan Mullen, Peyton Ramsey; IOWA: Chauncey Golston, Michael Sleep-Dalton, Tyler Linderbaum, Ihmir Smith-Marsette, Geno Stone, Kristian Welch; MARYLAND: Keandre Jones, Javon Leake, Ellis McKennie; MICHIGAN: Ronnie Bell, Nico Collins, Nick Eubanks, Jordan Glasgow, Hassan Haskins, Brad Hawkins, Giles Jackson, Cameron McGrone, Sean McKeon, Michael Onwenu, Donovan Peoples-Jones, Ambry Thomas; MICHIGAN STATE: Matt Coghlin, David Dowell, Jake Hartbarger, Mike Panasiuk, Antjuan Simmons, Cody White; MINNESOTA: Thomas Barber, Curtis Dunlap Jr., Coney Durr, Daniel Faalele, Kamal Martin, Conner Olson, Sam Renner, Sam Schlueter, Benjamin St-Juste; NEBRASKA: Mohammed Barry, Dicaprio Bootle, Khalil Davis, Brenden Jaimes, Dedrick Mills, Wan'Dale Robinson, JD Spielman, Cam Taylor-Britt; NORTHWESTERN: Blake Gallagher, Rashawn Slater, Jared Thomas; OHIO STATE: Tuf Borland, Baron Browning, Drue Chrisman, Jashon Cornell, Luke Farrell, K. J. Hill, Robert Landers, Pete Werner; PENN STATE: Cam Brown, Journey Brown, Sean Clifford, Will Fries, Blake Gillikin, K. J. Hamler, Jan Johnson, Michal Menet, Jake Pinegar, John Reid, Shaka Toney, Garrett Taylor, Lamont Wade, Robert Windsor; PURDUE: J.D. Dellinger, Ben Holt, Matt McCann, Cory Trice; RUTGERS: Tyshon Fogg, Willington Previlon; WISCONSIN: Logan Bruss, Eric Burrell, Quintez Cephus, Jack Coan, Jake Ferguson, Faion Hicks, Isaiahh Loudermilk, Rachad Wildgoose.

=== All-Americans ===
The 2019 College Football All-America Team is composed of the following College Football All-American first teams chosen by the following selector organizations: Associated Press (AP), Football Writers Association of America (FWAA), American Football Coaches Association (AFCA), Walter Camp Foundation (WCFF), The Sporting News (TSN), Sports Illustrated (SI), USA Today (USAT) ESPN, CBS Sports (CBS), FOX Sports (FOX) College Football News (CFN), Bleacher Report (BR), Scout.com, Phil Steele (PS), SB Nation (SB), Athlon Sports, Pro Football Focus (PFF), The Athletic, and Yahoo! Sports (Yahoo!).

Currently, the NCAA compiles consensus all-America teams in the sports of Division I-FBS football and Division I men's basketball using a point system computed from All-America teams named by coaches associations or media sources. The system consists of three points for a first-team honor, two points for second-team honor, and one point for third-team honor. Honorable mention and fourth team or lower recognitions are not accorded any points. Football consensus teams are compiled by position and the player accumulating the most points at each position is named first team consensus all-American. Currently, the NCAA recognizes All-Americans selected by the AP, AFCA, FWAA, TSN, and the WCFF to determine Consensus and Unanimous All-Americans. Any player named to the First Team by all five of the NCAA-recognized selectors is deemed a Unanimous All-American.

Position	Player	School	Selector	Unanimous	Consensus
**First Team All-Americans**
RB	Jonathan Taylor	Wisconsin	**AFCA**, **AP**, Athletic, Athlon, ESPN, **FWAA**, Phil Steele, SI, **TSN**, **WCFF**	*	*
RB	J. K. Dobbins	Ohio State	Athletic, Athlon, CBS, **FWAA**(AP), Phil Steele, USAT		
C	Tyler Biadasz	Wisconsin	**AFCA**, **AP**, Athletic, Athlon, CBS, ESPN, **FWAA**, Phil Steele, SI, **TSN**, USAT, **WCFF**	*	*
OG	Wyatt Davis	Ohio State	**AP**, Athletic, Athlon, CBS, ESPN, **TSN**, USAT		
OT	Tristan Wirfs	Iowa	**FWAA**, Phil Steele, **WCFF**		
DE	Chase Young	Ohio State	**AFCA**, **AP**, Athletic, Athlon, CBS, ESPN, **FWAA**, Phil Steele, SI, **TSN**, USAT, **WCFF**	*	*
DE	A. J. Epenesa	Iowa	Athletic		
LB	Micah Parsons	Penn State	**AFCA**, **AP**, Athlon, ESPN, SI, USAT		
LB	Zack Baun	Wisconsin	**FWAA**, Phil Steele, **WCFF**		
CB	Jeff Okudah	Ohio State	**AFCA**, **AP**, Athletic, Athlon, CBS, ESPN, **FWAA**, Phil Steele, SI, **TSN**, USAT, **WCFF**	*	*
S	Antoine Winfield Jr.	Minnesota	**AFCA**, **AP**, Athletic, Athlon, CBS, ESPN, **FWAA**, Phil Steele, SI, **TSN**, USAT, **WCFF**	*	*
K	Keith Duncan	Iowa	**AP**, Athletic, Athlon, **FWAA**, Phil Steele, **TSN**		*

Position	Player	School	Selector
**Second Team All-Americans**
QB	Justin Fields	Ohio State	AFCA, AP, Athletic, Athlon, CBS, FWAA, Phil Steele, USAT, WCFF
RB	Jonathan Taylor	Wisconsin	CBS, USAT
RB	J.K. Dobbins	Ohio State	AFCA, AP, SI, TSN, WCFF
WR	Rashod Bateman	Minnesota	Athlon, SI, USAT
TE	Brycen Hopkins	Purdue	CBS, SI, TSN, USAT
TE	Pat Freiermuth	Penn State	AFCA, Athletic
OG	Wyatt Davis	Ohio State	AFCA, FWAA, Phil Steele, SI, WCFF
OG	Ben Bredeson	Michigan	WCFF
OT	Cole Van Lanen	Wisconsin	CBS
OT	Tristan Wirfs	Iowa	AFCA, AP, Athletic, Athlon
DE	A. J. Epenesa	Iowa	AFCA, AP, Athlon, CBS, SI, USAT, WCFF
DE	Kenny Willekes	Michigan State	WCFF
LB	Zack Baun	Wisconsin	AFCA, AP, Athletic, Athlon, CBS, TSN, USAT
LB	Micah Parsons	Penn State	Athletic, CBS, FWAA, Phil Steele, TSN, WCFF
LB	Chris Orr	Wisconsin	Phil Steele
S	Jordan Fuller	Ohio State	CBS
K	Keith Duncan	Iowa	AFCA, USAT, WCFF
KR	Javon Leake	Maryland	Athlon

Position	Player	School	Selector
**Third Team All-Americans**
WR	Rashod Bateman	Minnesota	AP, Phil Steele
OG	Jonah Jackson	Ohio State	AP
OG	Ben Bredeson	Michigan	AP, Phil Steele
DE	Yetur Gross-Matos	Penn State	Phil Steele
DE	A. J. Epenesa	Iowa	Phil Steele
LB	Malik Harrison	Ohio State	AP, Athlon
LB	Dele Harding	Illinois	Phil Steele
KR	Ihmir Smith-Marsette	Iowa	Athlon
KR	Javon Leake	Maryland	Phil Steele

Position	Player	School	Selector
**Fourth Team All-Americans**
TE	Pat Freiermuth	Penn State	Phil Steele
OT	Josh Myers	Ohio State	Phil Steele
S	Lavert Hill	Michigan	Phil Steele

*Associated Press All-America Team (AP)
*Sports Illustrated All-America Team (SI)
*CBS Sports All-America Team (CBS)
*USA Today All-America Team (USAT)
*The Athletic All-America Team (Athletic)
*Walter Camp Football Foundation All-America Team (WCFF)
*ESPN All-America Team (ESPN)
*The Sporting News All-America Team (TSN)
*AFCA All-America Team (AFCA)
*FWAA All-America Team (FWAA)
*Athlon Sports All-America Team (Athlon)
*Phil Steele All-America Team (Phil Steele)

=== National award winners ===
2019 College Football Award Winners

Doak Walker Award (Best Running Back)
Jonathan Taylor, Wisconsin

Chuck Bednarik Award (Best Defensive Player)
Chase Young, Ohio State

Nagurski Award (Best Defensive Player)
Chase Young, Ohio State

Rimington Trophy (Best Center)
Tyler Biadasz, Wisconsin

Burlsworth Trophy (Best Former Walk-On)
Kenny Willekes, Michigan State

Disney Spirit Award (Most Inspirational Player)
Casey O'Brien, Minnesota

== Home attendance ==
Team	Stadium	Capacity	Game 1	Game 2	Game 3	Game 4	Game 5	Game 6	Game 7	Total	Average	% of Capacity
Illinois	Memorial Stadium	60,670	30,654	34,759	44,512	37,275	37,363	35,652	35,895	256,110	36,587	60.3%
Indiana	Memorial Stadium	52,656	37,784	47,945	40,084	37,055	40,924	43,671	–	247,463	41,244	78.3%
Iowa	Kinnick Stadium	69,250	69,250	61,808	63,706	69,034	69,250	67,518	58,331	458,897	65,557	94.7%
Maryland	Maryland Stadium	51,802	32,761	33,493	53,228	32,606	40,701	34,082	–	226,871	37,812	73.0%
Michigan	Michigan Stadium	107,601	110,811	111,747	110,662	111,519	111,909	111,496	112,071	780,215	111,459	103.6%
Michigan State	Spartan Stadium	75,005	72,005	73,113	73,531	71,048	70,298	63,370	51,366	474,731	67,819	90.4%
Minnesota	TCF Bank Stadium	50,805	49,112	41,021	39,341	43,502	44,715	51,883	53,756	323,330	46,190	90.9%
Nebraska	Memorial Stadium	85,458	89,502	89,593	89,759	89,384	89,317	88,842	89,039	625,436	89,348	104.6%
Northwestern	Ryan Field	47,130	37,714	40,114	47,330	42,104	29,447	30,246	37,194	264,149	37,736	80.1%
Ohio State	Ohio Stadium	102,780	103,228	104,089	103,190	104,797	102,998	101,022	104,355	723,679	103,383	100.6%
Penn State	Beaver Stadium	106,572	104,527	104,136	108,661	106,536	110,669	106,323	98,895	739,747	105,678	99.2%
Purdue	Ross–Ade Stadium	57,236	50,506	60,037	50,629	52,296	58,735	50,606	55,338	378,147	54,021	94.4%
Rutgers	SHI Stadium	52,454	40,515	32,217	30,185	26,429	23,058	33,528	24,641	210,573	30,082	57.3%
Wisconsin	Camp Randall Stadium	80,321	74,437	80,245	76,825	74,559	80,470	78,018	70,747	535,301	76,472	95.2%

Bold – Exceed capacity
†Season High
‡Played at Soldier Field

== 2020 NFL draft ==
The Big Ten had 48 players selected in the 2020 NFL Draft, which was second among all FBS conferences, trailing only the SEC who had 63 picks.

Team	Round 1	Round 2	Round 3	Round 4	Round 5	Round 6	Round 7	Total
Illinois	–	–	–	–	–	–	–	–
Indiana	–	–	–	–	–	1	–	1
Iowa	1	1	1	–	–	–	2	5
Maryland	–	–	–	1	–	1	–	2
Michigan	1	1	–	1	2	5	–	10
Michigan State	–	–	–	1	–	–	1	2
Minnesota	–	1	–	–	2	–	2	5
Nebraska	–	–	–	–	–	1	1	2
Northwestern	–	–	–	–	–	–	–	–
Ohio State	3	1	3	–	–	1	2	10
Penn State	–	2	–	1	–	2	–	5
Purdue	–	–	–	1	–	–	1	2
Rutgers	–	–	–	–	–	–	–	–
Wisconsin	–	1	1	1	1	–	–	4

*	= Compensatory Selections

Rnd.	Pick	Team	Player	Pos.	College	Notes
1	2	Washington Redskins	Chase Young	DE	Ohio State	
1	3	Detroit Lions	Jeff Okudah	CB	Ohio State	
1	13	Tampa Bay Buccaneers	Tristan Wirfs	T	Iowa	from Indianapolis via San Francisco (Note: No. 13: multiple trades. No. 13: Indianapolis → San Francisco (PD). Indianapolis traded a first-round selection to San Francisco in exchange for defensive tackle DeForest Buckner. San Francisco → Tampa Bay (D). San Francisco traded this first-round selection and a seventh-round selection (13th and 245th) to Tampa Bay in exchange for a first-round selection and a fourth-round pick (14th and 117th).)
1	19	Las Vegas Raiders	Damon Arnette	CB	Ohio State	from Chicago (Note: No. 19: Chicago → Las Vegas (PD). Chicago traded first- and third-round selections as well as 2019 first- and sixth-round selections to Las Vegas, then based in Oakland, in exchange for outside linebacker Khalil Mack, a second-round selection, and a conditional fifth-round selection, later converted into a seventh-round selection.)
1	24	New Orleans Saints	Cesar Ruiz	C	Michigan	
2	38	Carolina Panthers	Yetur Gross-Matos	DE	Penn State	
2	41	Indianapolis Colts	Jonathan Taylor	RB	Wisconsin	from Cleveland (Note: No. 41: Cleveland → Indianapolis (D). Cleveland traded a second-round selection (41st) to Indianapolis in exchange for a second- and a fifth-round selection (44th and 160th).)
2	45	Tampa Bay Buccaneers	Antoine Winfield Jr.	S	Minnesota	
2	46	Denver Broncos	K. J. Hamler	WR	Penn State	
2	54	Buffalo Bills	A. J. Epenesa	DE	Iowa	
2	55	Baltimore Ravens	J. K. Dobbins	RB	Ohio State	from New England via Atlanta (Note: No. 55: multiple trades. New England → Atlanta (PD). New England traded a second-round selection to Atlanta in exchange for wide receiver Mohamed Sanu. Atlanta → Baltimore (PD). Atlanta traded New England's second-round selection and a fifth-round selection to Baltimore in exchange for tight end Hayden Hurst and a fourth-round pick.)
2	60	New England Patriots	Josh Uche	LB	Michigan	from Baltimore (Note: No. 60: Baltimore → New England (D). Baltimore traded second- and fourth-round selections (60th and 129th) to New England in exchange for two third--round selections (71st and 98th).)
3	73	Jacksonville Jaguars	Davon Hamilton	DT	Ohio State	
3	74	New Orleans Saints	Zack Baun	LB	Wisconsin	from Cleveland
3	75	Detroit Lions	Jonah Jackson	G	Ohio State	from Indianapolis
3	77	Denver Broncos	Michael Ojemudia	CB	Iowa	
**3***	98	Baltimore Ravens	Malik Harrison	LB	Ohio State	from New England (Note: No. 98: New England → Baltimore (D). See No. 60: Baltimore → New England.)
4	124	Pittsburgh Steelers	Anthony McFarland Jr.	RB	Maryland	
4	136	Los Angeles Rams	Brycen Hopkins	TE	Purdue	from Green Bay via Miami and Houston (Note: No. 136: multiple trades. Green Bay → Miami (D). Miami → Houston (D). See #KindleyTrade)
4	137	Jacksonville Jaguars	Josiah Scott	CB	Michigan State	from San Francisco via Denver (Note: No. 137: multiple trades. San Francisco → Denver (PD). See #SandersTrade)
**4***	141	Houston Texans	John Reid	CB	Penn State	from Miami (Note: No. 141: Miami → Houston (D). See #KindleyTrade)
**4***	143	Baltimore Ravens	Ben Bredeson	G	Michigan	
**4***	146	Dallas Cowboys	Tyler Biadasz	C	Wisconsin	from Philadelphia (Note: No. 146: Philadelphia → Dallas (D). Philadelphia traded a fourth-round selection (146th) to Dallas in exchange for a fifth-round selection (164th) and a 2021 fifth-round selection.)
5	161	Tampa Bay Buccaneers	Tyler Johnson	WR	Minnesota	
5	162	Washington Redskins	Khaleke Hudson	LB	Michigan	from Pittsburgh via Seattle (Note: No. 162: multiple trades. Pittsburgh → Seattle (PD). Pittsburgh traded a fifth-round selection to Seattle in exchange for tight end Nick Vannett. Seattle → Washington (PD). Seattle traded Pittsburgh's fifth-round selection to Washington in exchange for cornerback Quinton Dunbar.)
5	166	Detroit Lions	Quintez Cephus	WR	Wisconsin	from Philadelphia (Note: No. 166: Philadelphia → Detroit (PD). See #SlayTrade)
5	175	Green Bay Packers	Kamal Martin	LB	Minnesota	
5	177	Kansas City Chiefs	Michael Danna	DE	Michigan	
6	182	New England Patriots	Michael Onwenu	G	Michigan	from Detroit via Indianapolis (Note: No. 182: multiple trades. Detroit → Indianapolis (D). See #JonahJacksonTrade)
6	183	New York Giants	Cameron Brown	LB	Penn State	
6	187	Cleveland Browns	Donovan Peoples-Jones	WR	Michigan	from Arizona (Note: No. 187: Arizona → Cleveland (PD). Arizona traded a sixth-round selection to Cleveland in exchange for cornerback Jamar Taylor.)
6	192	Green Bay Packers	Jon Runyan Jr.	G	Michigan	from Las Vegas (Note: No. 192: Las Vegas → Green Bay (PD). Las Vegas, then based in Oakland, traded a sixth-round selection to Green Bay in exchange for wide receiver Trevor Davis.)
6	193	Indianapolis Colts	Robert Windsor	DT	Penn State	
6	194	Tampa Bay Buccaneers	Khalil Davis	DT	Nebraska	
6	198	Pittsburgh Steelers	Antoine Brooks	S	Maryland	
6	199	Los Angeles Rams	Jordan Fuller	S	Ohio State	
6	205	Minnesota Vikings	Josh Metellus	S	Michigan	
6	209	Green Bay Packers	Simon Stepaniak	G	Indiana	
**6***	213	Indianapolis Colts	Jordan Glasgow	LB	Michigan	from New England (Note: No. 213: New England → Indianapolis (D). See #OnwenuTrade)
7	215	Cincinnati Bengals	Markus Bailey	LB	Purdue	
7	218	New York Giants	Carter Coughlin	LB	Minnesota	
7	219	Baltimore Ravens	Geno Stone	S	Iowa	from Miami via Minnesota (Note: No. 219: multiple trades. Miami → Minnesota (PD). Miami traded a seventh-round selection to Minnesota in exchange for offensive guard Danny Isidora. Minnesota → Baltimore (D). See #MinnesotaBaltimore)
7	220	Los Angeles Chargers	K. J. Hill	WR	Ohio State	
7	225	Minnesota Vikings	Kenny Willekes	DE	Michigan State	from N.Y. Jets via Baltimore (Note: No. 225: multiple trades. N.Y. Jets → Baltimore (PD). The New York Jets traded a conditional seventh-round selection to Baltimore in exchange for guard Alex Lewis. Baltimore → Minnesota (D). See #MinnesotaBaltimore)
7	232	Pittsburgh Steelers	Carlos Davis	DT	Nebraska	
7	235	Detroit Lions	Jashon Cornell	DT	Ohio State	from Philadelphia via New England (Note: No. 235: multiple trades. Philadelphia → New England (PD). See #BennettTrade)
7	244	Minnesota Vikings	Nate Stanley	QB	Iowa	from Green Bay via Cleveland and New Orleans (Note: No. 241: multiple trades. Green Bay → Cleveland (PD). See #McCrayTrade)
**7***	247	New York Giants	Chris Williamson	CB	Minnesota	

Draft Notes

== Head coaches ==
Current through the completion of the 2019-20 season

Team	Head coach	Years at school	Overall record	Record at school	B1G record
Illinois	Lovie Smith	4	15–34 (.306)	15–34 (.306)	8–28 (.222)
Indiana	Tom Allen*	3	18–20 (.474)	18–20 (.474)	9–18 (.333)
Iowa	Kirk Ferentz	21	174–125 (.582)	162–104 (.609)	97–75 (.564)
Maryland	Mike Locksley*	1	6–40 (.130)	4–14 (.222)	2–13 (.133)
Michigan	Jim Harbaugh	5	105–44 (.705)	47–18 (.723)	32–12 (.727)
Michigan State	Mark Dantonio	13	132–74 (.641)	114–57 (.667)	69–39 (.639)
Minnesota	P. J. Fleck	3	53–37 (.589)	23–15 (.605)	12–15 (.444)
Nebraska	Scott Frost	2	28–22 (.560)	9–15 (.375)	6–12 (.333)
Northwestern	Pat Fitzgerald	14	99–79 (.556)	99–79 (.556)	57–59 (.491)
Ohio State	Ryan Day*	1	16–1 (.941)	16–1 (.941)	10–0 (1.000)
Penn State	James Franklin	6	80–38 (.678)	56–23 (.709)	34–18 (.654)
Purdue	Jeff Brohm	3	47–31 (.603)	17–21 (.447)	12–15 (.444)
Rutgers	Chris Ash	4	8–32 (.200)	8–32 (.200)	3–26 (.103)
Rutgers	Nunzio Campanile*	1	1–7 (.125)	1–7 (.125)	0–7 (.000)
Wisconsin	Paul Chryst	5	71–35 (.670)	52–16 (.765)	34–10 (.773)

* Tom Allen was hired to replace Kevin Wilson in December 2016 at Indiana and coached the Hoosiers in their 2016 bowl game, going 0–1.

* Mike Locksley served as interim head coach at Maryland in 2015 and coached for six games, going 1–5.

* Ryan Day served as interim head coach at Ohio State for the first three games of the 2018 season while Urban Meyer served a three-game suspension and went 3–0.

* Chris Ash was terminated as head coach at Rutgers on Sept. 29, 2019. Tight ends coach Nunzio Campanile was named interim coach for the remainder of the 2019 season.
