= 2019 Northwestern Wildcats football team =

American college football season

2019 Northwestern Wildcats football
- Conference: Big Ten Conference
- West Division
- Record: 3–9 (1–8 Big Ten)
- Head coach: Pat Fitzgerald (14th season)
- Offensive coordinator: Mick McCall (12th season)
- Offensive scheme: Spread
- Defensive coordinator: Mike Hankwitz (12th season)
- Base defense: Multiple 4–3
- Home stadium: Ryan Field

Uniform
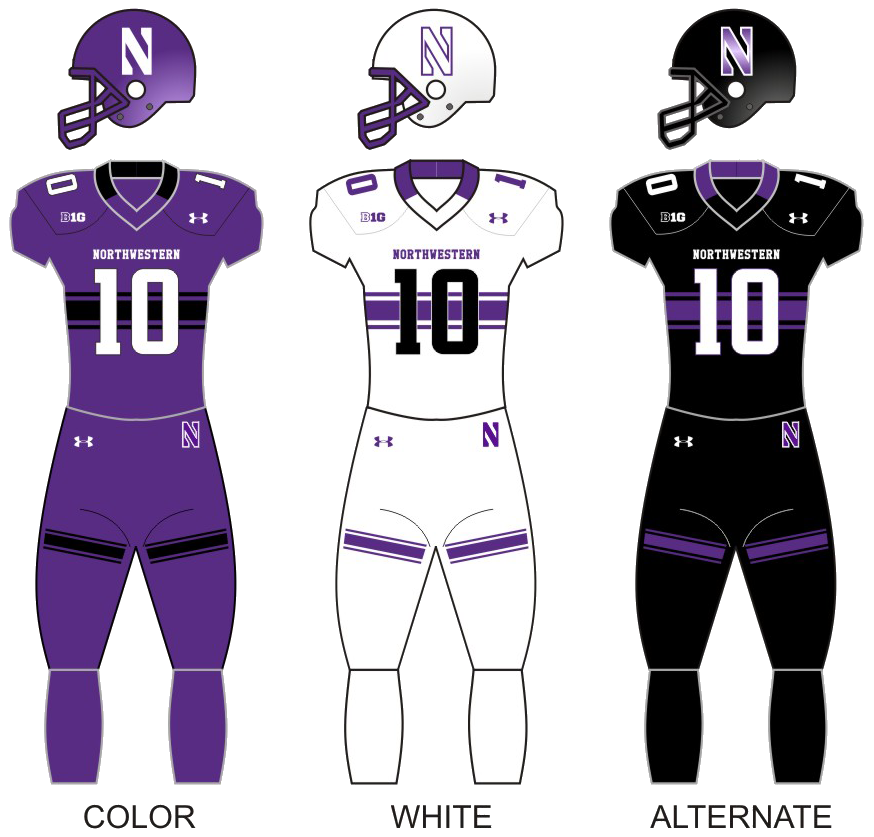

2019 Big Ten Conference football standings
| | Conf. | | | Overall |
| Team | W | | L | W | | L |
|---|---|---|---|---|---|---|
East Division
| No. 3 Ohio State xy$^ | 9 | – | 0 | 13 | – | 1 |
| No. 9 Penn State | 7 | – | 2 | 11 | – | 2 |
| No. 18 Michigan | 6 | – | 3 | 9 | – | 4 |
| Indiana | 5 | – | 4 | 8 | – | 5 |
| Michigan State | 4 | – | 5 | 7 | – | 6 |
| Maryland | 1 | – | 8 | 3 | – | 9 |
| Rutgers | 0 | – | 9 | 2 | – | 10 |
West Division
| No. 11 Wisconsin xy | 7 | – | 2 | 10 | – | 4 |
| No. 10 Minnesota x | 7 | – | 2 | 11 | – | 2 |
| No. 15 Iowa | 6 | – | 3 | 10 | – | 3 |
| Illinois | 4 | – | 5 | 6 | – | 7 |
| Purdue | 3 | – | 6 | 4 | – | 8 |
| Nebraska | 3 | – | 6 | 5 | – | 7 |
| Northwestern | 1 | – | 8 | 3 | – | 9 |
Championship: Ohio State 34, Wisconsin 21
^ – College Football Playoff participant; $ – Conference champion; x – Division champion/co-champions; y – Championship game participant; Rankings from AP Poll

The 2019 Northwestern Wildcats football team represented Northwestern University during the 2019 NCAA Division I FBS football season. The Wildcats played their home games at Ryan Field in Evanston, Illinois and competed in the West Division of the Big Ten Conference. They were led by 14th-year head coach Pat Fitzgerald. They finished the season 3–9, 1–8 in Big Ten play to finish in last place in the West Division.

== Preseason ==
=== Preseason Big Ten poll ===
Although the Big Ten Conference has not held an official preseason poll since 2010, Cleveland.com has polled sports journalists representing all member schools as a de facto preseason media poll since 2011. For the 2019 poll, Northwestern was projected to finish in fourth in the West Division.

== Schedule ==
Northwestern would open its 2019 schedule with two non-conference games, first on the road against Stanford of the Pac-12 Conference, and then the season home opener against UNLV of the Mountain West Conference. Northwestern's third non-conference game, against independent UMass, would be played in November.

In Big Ten Conference play, Northwestern would play all fellow members of the West Division, and drew Michigan State, Ohio State, and Indiana from the East Division. Northwestern's game against Ohio State, a rematch of the 2018 Big Ten Championship Game, would be played on a Friday night, a decision by the Big Ten Conference which drew ire from Northwestern officials and head coach Pat Fitzgerald.

| Date | Time | Opponent | Site | TV | Result | Attendance |
|---|---|---|---|---|---|---|
| August 31 | 3:00 p.m. | at No. 25 Stanford* | Stanford Stadium; Stanford, CA | FOX | L 7–17 | 37,179 |
| September 14 | 2:30 p.m. | UNLV* | Ryan Field; Evanston, IL | BTN | W 30–14 | 37,714 |
| September 21 | 11:00 a.m. | Michigan State | Ryan Field; Evanston, IL | ABC | L 10–31 | 40,114 |
| September 28 | 11:00 a.m. | at No. 8 Wisconsin | Camp Randall Stadium; Madison, WI | ABC | L 15–24 | 76,825 |
| October 5 | 3:00 p.m. | at Nebraska | Memorial Stadium; Lincoln, NE | FOX | L 10–13 | 89,348 |
| October 18 | 7:30 p.m. | No. 4 Ohio State | Ryan Field; Evanston, IL | BTN | L 3–52 | 47,130 |
| October 26 | 11:00 a.m. | No. 20 Iowa^{†} | Ryan Field; Evanston, IL | ESPN2 | L 0–20 | 42,104 |
| November 2 | 6:00 p.m. | at Indiana | Memorial Stadium; Bloomington, IN | FS1 | L 3–34 | 40,924 |
| November 9 | 11:00 a.m. | Purdue | Ryan Field; Evanston, IL | BTN | L 22–24 | 37,194 |
| November 16 | 11:00 a.m. | UMass* | Ryan Field; Evanston, IL | BTN | W 45–6 | 29,447 |
| November 23 | 11:00 a.m. | No. 10 Minnesota | Ryan Field; Evanston, IL | ABC | L 22–38 | 30,246 |
| November 30 | 11:00 a.m. | at Illinois | Memorial Stadium; Champaign, IL (Land of Lincoln Trophy) | FS1 | W 29–10 | 35,895 |
*Non-conference game; ^{†}Homecoming; Rankings from AP Poll and CFP Rankings (after November 5) released prior to game; All times are in Central time

== Rankings ==
Ranking movements Legend: ██ Increase in ranking ██ Decrease in ranking — = Not ranked RV = Received votes
| | Week | | | | | | | | | | | | | | | | |
| Poll | Pre | 1 | 2 | 3 | 4 | 5 | 6 | 7 | 8 | 9 | 10 | 11 | 12 | 13 | 14 | 15 | Final |
|---|---|---|---|---|---|---|---|---|---|---|---|---|---|---|---|---|---|
| AP | RV | — | — | — | — | — | — | — | — | — | — | — | — | — | — | — | |
| Coaches | 25 | RV | — | — | — | — | — | — | — | — | — | — | — | — | — | — | |
| CFP | Not released | | | | | | | | | | — | — | — | — | — | — | Not released |

== Game summaries ==
=== At Stanford ===
| | 1 | 2 | 3 | 4 | Total |
|---|---|---|---|---|---|
| Wildcats | 0 | 0 | 0 | 7 | 7 |
| No. 25 Cardinal | 0 | 10 | 0 | 7 | 17 |

=== UNLV ===
| | 1 | 2 | 3 | 4 | Total |
|---|---|---|---|---|---|
| Rebels | 7 | 7 | 0 | 0 | 14 |
| Wildcats | 10 | 6 | 7 | 7 | 30 |

=== Michigan State ===
| | 1 | 2 | 3 | 4 | Total |
|---|---|---|---|---|---|
| Spartans | 7 | 7 | 10 | 7 | 31 |
| Wildcats | 0 | 3 | 0 | 7 | 10 |

=== At Wisconsin ===
| | 1 | 2 | 3 | 4 | Total |
|---|---|---|---|---|---|
| Wildcats | 3 | 0 | 0 | 12 | 15 |
| No. 8 Badgers | 7 | 0 | 7 | 10 | 24 |

=== At Nebraska ===
| | 1 | 2 | 3 | 4 | Total |
|---|---|---|---|---|---|
| Wildcats | 0 | 3 | 7 | 0 | 10 |
| Cornhuskers | 7 | 3 | 0 | 3 | 13 |

=== Ohio State ===
| | 1 | 2 | 3 | 4 | Total |
|---|---|---|---|---|---|
| No. 4 Buckeyes | 7 | 24 | 7 | 14 | 52 |
| Wildcats | 3 | 0 | 0 | 0 | 3 |

=== Iowa ===
| | 1 | 2 | 3 | 4 | Total |
|---|---|---|---|---|---|
| No. 20 Hawkeyes | 7 | 3 | 7 | 3 | 20 |
| Wildcats | 0 | 0 | 0 | 0 | 0 |

=== At Indiana ===
| | 1 | 2 | 3 | 4 | Total |
|---|---|---|---|---|---|
| Wildcats | 0 | 3 | 0 | 0 | 3 |
| Hoosiers | 10 | 14 | 7 | 3 | 34 |

=== Purdue ===
| | 1 | 2 | 3 | 4 | Total |
|---|---|---|---|---|---|
| Boilermakers | 0 | 7 | 14 | 3 | 24 |
| Wildcats | 14 | 2 | 0 | 6 | 22 |

=== UMass ===
| | 1 | 2 | 3 | 4 | Total |
|---|---|---|---|---|---|
| Minutemen | 3 | 3 | 0 | 0 | 6 |
| Wildcats | 0 | 21 | 3 | 21 | 45 |

=== Minnesota ===
| | 1 | 2 | 3 | 4 | Total |
|---|---|---|---|---|---|
| No. 10 Golden Gophers | 14 | 7 | 7 | 10 | 38 |
| Wildcats | 0 | 9 | 7 | 6 | 22 |

=== At Illinois ===
| | 1 | 2 | 3 | 4 | Total |
|---|---|---|---|---|---|
| Wildcats | 3 | 7 | 7 | 12 | 29 |
| Fighting Illini | 0 | 7 | 3 | 0 | 10 |

== Roster ==
2019 Northwestern Wildcats football team roster
Players
Coaches
Offense

| Pos. | # | Name | Class |
|---|---|---|---|
| WR | 4 | Berkeley Holman | So |
| WR | 5 | Jace James | So |
| RB | 6 | Drake Anderson | Fr |
| QB | 7 | Andrew Marty | So |
| WR | 8 | Kyric McGowan | Jr |
| QB | 10 | T. J. Green | Sr |
| QB | 11 | Aidan Smith | Jr |
| WR | 12 | J. J. Jefferson | So |
| QB | 13 | Jason Whittaker | Fr |
| WR | 14 | Malik Washington | Fr |
| QB | 15 | Hunter Johnson | So |
| WR | 16 | Zac Krause | Fr |
| WR | 17 | Bryce Kirtz | Fr |
| WR | 18 | Genson Hooper Price | Fr |
| WR | 19 | Riley Lees | Jr |
| RB | 20 | John Moten IV | Sr |
| RB | 22 | Connor Newhouse | Fr |
| WR | 23 | Raymond Niro III | Fr |
| RB | 25 | Isaiah Bowser | So |
| RB | 26 | Evan Hull | Fr |
| RB | 36 | Jesse Brown | Jr |
| RB | 39 | Marcus Cisco | Fr |
| SB | 45 | Tommy Carnifax | Jr |
| OL | 52 | Sam Gerak | So |
| OL | 54 | Conrad Rowley | Fr |
| OL | 56 | Sam Stovall | Fr |
| OL | 57 | Cam Kolwich | Jr |
| OL | 61 | Jason Goosen | Jr |
| OL | 63 | Dom D'Antonio | Fr |
| OL | 65 | Jared Thomas | Sr |
| OL | 66 | Nik Urban | Jr |
| OL | 69 | Charlie Schmidt | Fr |
| OL | 70 | Rashawn Slater | Jr |
| OL | 73 | Gunnar Vogel | Jr |
| OL | 74 | Payne He'Bert | Fr |
| OL | 75 | Connor Foster | Fr |
| OL | 76 | Ethan Wiederkehr | So |
| OL | 77 | Jesse Meyler | Jr |
| OL | 79 | Zachary Franks | Fr |
| SB | 80 | Trey Pugh | Jr |
| WR | 81 | Ramaud Chiaokhiao-Bowman | Jr |
| WR | 82 | Braeden Heald | Fr |
| SB | 82 | Alex Oelsner | So |
| SB | 83 | Trent Goens | Sr |
| WR | 84 | Will Lansbury | So |
| WR | 85 | Jack Kennedy | Fr |
| WR | 86 | Wayne Dennis Jr. | Fr |
| SB | 86 | Cody Link | Jr |
| SB | 87 | Thomas Gordon | Fr |
| WR | 88 | Ben Skowronek | Sr |
| WR | 89 | Preston Bacon | Fr |
| SB | 89 | Charlie Mangieri | So |

Defense

| Pos. | # | Name | Class |
|---|---|---|---|
| DB | 1 | Joe Bergin | Sr |
| DB | 2 | Greg Newsome II | So |
| DB | 3 | Trae Williams | Sr |
| DB | 7 | Travis Whillock | Jr |
| DB | 9 | Roderick Campbell | Sr |
| DB | 10 | Jeremiah McDonald | Fr |
| DB | 11 | A. J. Hampton | Fr |
| DB | 13 | J. R. Pace | Jr |
| DB | 16 | Brandon Joseph | Fr |
| DB | 18 | Cameron Ruiz | So |
| DB | 21 | Cameron Mitchell | Fr |
| DB | 22 | Bryce Jackson | So |
| DB | 23 | Donovan Sermons | So |
| DB | 24 | Rod Heard II | Fr |
| DB | 26 | Brian Bullock | Jr |
| DB | 27 | Coco Azema | Fr |
| LB | 28 | Chris Bergin | Jr |
| CB | 29 | Tyler Haskins | Fr |
| LB | 31 | Jaylen Rivers | Fr |
| LB | 32 | Bryce Gallagher | Fr |
| LB | 33 | Michael Jansey Jr. | Fr |
| LB | 35 | Erik Mueller | Jr |
| LB | 40 | Peter McIntyre | So |
| LB | 41 | Grayson Mann | Fr |
| LB | 42 | Paddy Fisher | Jr |
| LB | 44 | Khalid Jones | Fr |
| DL | 46 | Devin O'Rourke | Fr |
| LB | 47 | Troy Hudetz | Jr |
| DL | 49 | Adetomiwa Adebawore | Fr |
| DL | 50 | P. J. Spencer | Fr |
| LB | 51 | Blake Gallagher | Jr |
| DL | 53 | Eku Leota | Fr |
| DE | 55 | Mark Gooden | Jr |
| DL | 68 | Wyatt Blake | Fr |
| DL | 78 | Luka Trifunovic | Fr |
| DT | 90 | Jake Saunders | Jr |
| DL | 91 | Samdup Miller | Jr |
| DL | 92 | Willy Boatman | Fr |
| DL | 93 | Joe Spivak | Jr |
| DE | 94 | Jason Gold Jr. | Fr |
| DL | 95 | Alex Miller | Sr |
| DE | 96 | Trevor Kent | So |
| DL | 97 | Joe Gaziano | Sr |
| DL | 98 | Duke Olges | Fr |
| DE | 99 | Earnest Brown IV | Jr |

Special teams

| Pos. | # | Name | Class |
|---|---|---|---|
| K | 14 | Charlie Kuhbander | Jr |
| K, P | 15 | Trey Finison | Fr |
| P | 17 | Daniel Kubiuk | Sr |
| P | 34 | Andrew David | Fr |
| P | 37 | Cody Gronewold | So |
| K, P | 38 | Drew Luckenbaugh | Jr |
| LS | 43 | Tyler Gillikin | Jr |
| LS | 48 | Peter Snodgrass | So |
| P | 90 | Jake Genyk | Fr |

Head coach

- Pat Fitzgerald

Coordinators/assistant coaches

- Kurt Anderson (offensive line)
- Lou Ayeni (running backs / recruiting coordinator)
- Jeff Genyk (special teams coordinator)
- Mike Hankwitz (defensive coordinator)
- Bob Heffner (Superbacks)
- Marty Long (defensive line)
- Matt McPherson (Associate head coach / defensive backs)
- Mick McCall (offensive coordinator / quarterbacks)
- Tim McGarigle (linebackers)
- Dennis Springer (wide receivers)
- Cody Cejda (director of football operations)
- Darby Dunnagan (director of Video Operations)
- Jay Hooten (director of Sports Performance for Football)
- Jacob Schmidt (director of player development)
- Bryan Payton (director of Recruiting Communications)
- Jonny Kovach (director of Recruiting Operations)
- Todd McShane (director of Scouting)
- John Holloway (assistant director of football operations)
- Kevin Koch (defensive graduate assistant)

Legend

- (C) Team captain
- (S) Suspended
- (I) Ineligible
- Injured
- Redshirt

Roster
Last update: October 13, 2019
