= Cesar Ruiz (American football) =

American football player (born 1999)

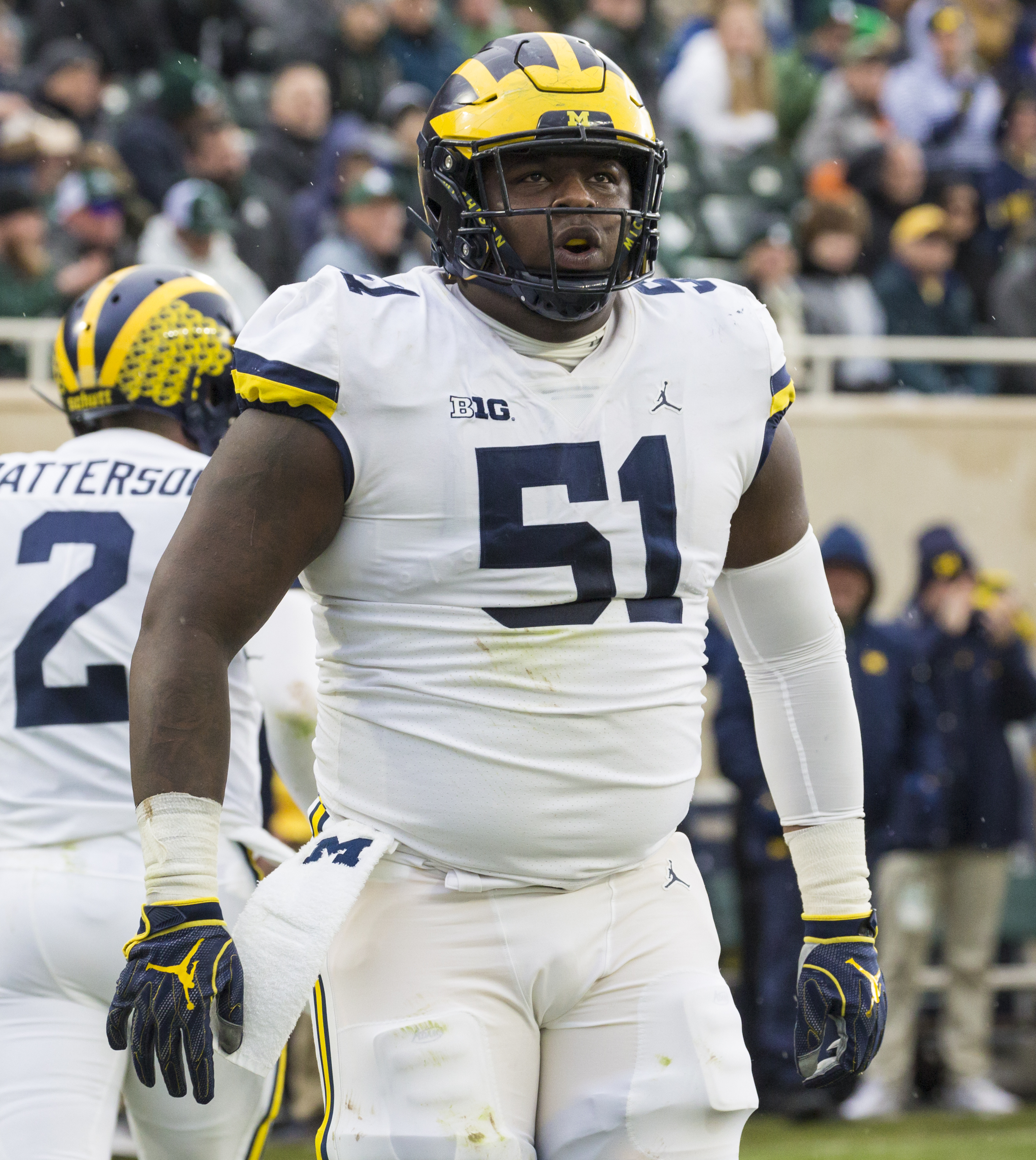
- Ruiz with the Michigan Wolverines in 2018

No. 51 – New Orleans Saints
- Position: Guard
- Roster status: Active

Personal information
- Born: June 14, 1999 (age 27); Camden, New Jersey, U.S.
- Listed height: 6 ft 4 in (1.93 m)
- Listed weight: 316 lb (143 kg)

Career information
- High school: IMG Academy (Bradenton, Florida)
- College: Michigan (2017–2019)
- NFL draft: 2020: 1st round, 24th overall pick

Career history
- New Orleans Saints (2020–present)

Awards and highlights
- Second-team All-Big Ten (2019); Third-team All-Big Ten (2018)

Career NFL statistics as of 2025
- Games played: 89
- Games started: 83
- Stats at Pro Football Reference

Cesar André Ruiz (born June 14, 1999) is an American professional football guard for the New Orleans Saints of the National Football League (NFL). He played college football for the Michigan Wolverines, and was selected by the Saints in the first round of the 2020 NFL draft.

== Early life ==
Ruiz was born to an African-American mother and a father of Puerto Rican & Dominican descent and grew up in Camden, New Jersey. Ruiz's father, Cesar Edwin Ruiz, was killed when he was struck by a motorist while helping a driver change tires when Cesar was eight years old. He attended Camden High School before transferring to IMG Academy in Bradenton, Florida after his sophomore year. Ruiz was named an Under Armour All-American as a senior in 2017. Rated a four-star recruit and the top center in his class nationally, Ruiz committed to play college football at Michigan over offers from Florida, Auburn, LSU, and several other top-level programs.

== College career ==
Ruiz played in ten games as a freshman, starting five games at right guard and long snapper with his first career start coming against Minnesota. Ruiz started all 13 of Michigan's games at center as a sophomore and was named third-team All-Big Ten Conference by the league's coaches and was an honorable mention selection by the media.

Ruiz was named to the Watchlist for the Rimington Trophy going into his junior season. Ruiz started all 13 of Michigan's games at center, allowing only eight total quarterback pressures in 447 snaps and was named the best pass blocking center in college football by Pro Football Focus, and was named second-team All-Big Ten by the coaches and third-team by the media. Following the end of the season, Ruiz announced that he had decided to forgo his senior season in order to enter the 2020 NFL draft. Over three seasons, Ruiz played in 36 games for Michigan with 31 games started.

== Professional career ==
Pre-draft measurables
Height	Weight	Arm length	Hand span	Wingspan	40-yard dash	10-yard split	20-yard split	20-yard shuttle	Three-cone drill	Vertical jump	Broad jump	Bench press	Wonderlic
6 ft 2 3/4 in (1.90 m)	307 lb (139 kg)	33 1/8 in (0.84 m)	11 in (0.28 m)	6 ft 7 5/8 in (2.02 m)	5.08 s	1.77 s	2.94 s	4.64 s	7.91 s	33.0 in (0.84 m)	9 ft 5 in (2.87 m)	28 reps	21
All values from NFL Combine

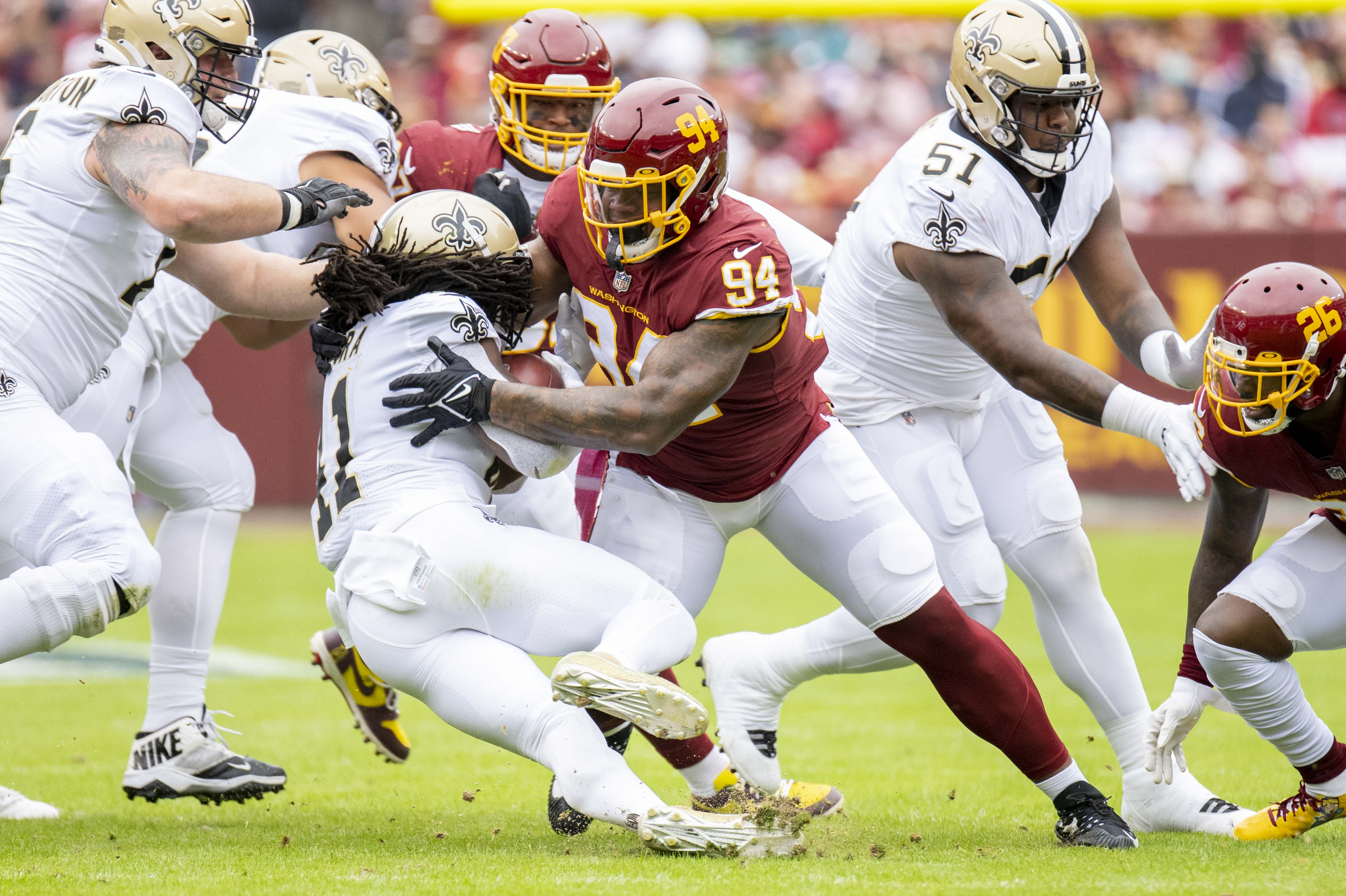
Ruiz (right, #51) playing for the Saints in 2021.

Ruiz was selected by the New Orleans Saints in the first round with the 24th overall pick in the 2020 NFL draft. Ruiz made his NFL debut on September 21, 2020, on Monday Night Football against the Las Vegas Raiders, playing on six snaps at right guard.

In the 2021 season opening win against the Green Bay Packers, Ruiz started the game at right guard, but played center for rest of the game after Erik McCoy suffered a calf injury in the first quarter. He continued being the team's starting center for the next four games until McCoy returned in Week 7 and Ruiz moved back to right guard.

On December 20, 2022, the Saints placed Ruiz on season–ending injured reserve with a foot injury. The next day, it was revealed that Ruiz had suffered a Lisfranc fracture during the team's final offensive possession in Week 15 against the Atlanta Falcons.

On September 9, 2023, Ruiz signed a four-year, $44 million contract extension with the Saints with $30 million guaranteed.
