= Brycen Hopkins =

American football player (born 1997)

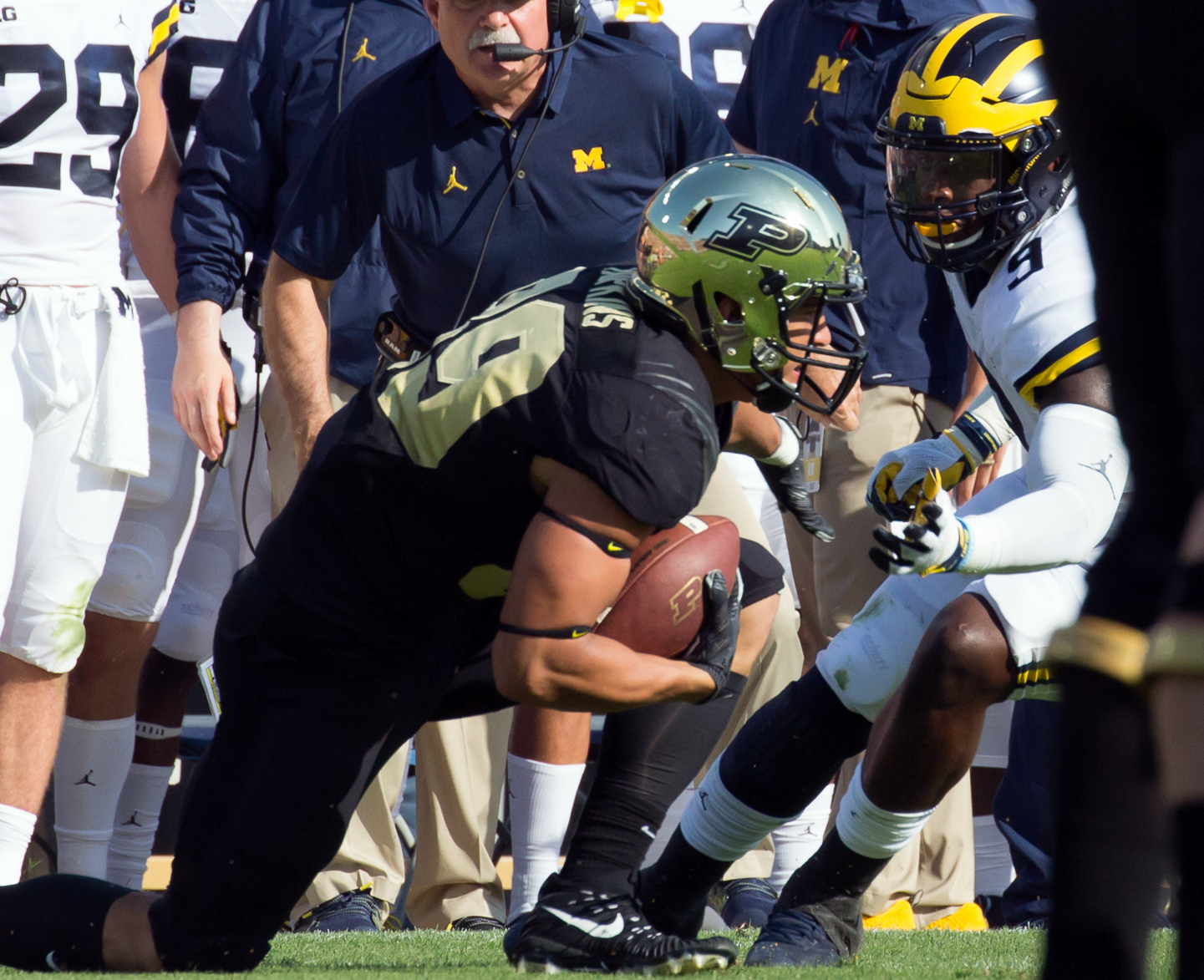
- Hopkins with the Purdue Boilermakers in 2017

Profile
- Position: Tight end

Personal information
- Born: March 27, 1997 (age 29); Nashville, Tennessee, U.S.
- Listed height: 6 ft 4 in (1.93 m)
- Listed weight: 245 lb (111 kg)

Career information
- High school: The Ensworth School (Nashville, Tennessee)
- College: Purdue (2015–2019)
- NFL draft: 2020: 4th round, 136th overall pick

Career history
- Los Angeles Rams (2020–2023)

Awards and highlights
- Super Bowl champion (LVI); Big Ten Tight End of the Year (2019); First-team All-Big Ten (2019); Third-team All-Big Ten (2018)

Career NFL statistics as of 2024
- Receptions: 13
- Receiving yards: 196
- Stats at Pro Football Reference

Brycen Avery Hopkins (born March 27, 1997) is an American professional football tight end. He played college football at Purdue, and was selected by the Los Angeles Rams in the fourth round of the 2020 NFL draft.

== Early life ==
Hopkins grew up in Nashville, Tennessee and attended The Ensworth School. He initially focused on basketball and did not play organized football until his junior year. He was named Division II-AA All-State as a senior. Rated a two-star prospect by Rivals.com and three-star prospect by 247Sports.com, Hopkins committed to play college football at Purdue. He was offered a scholarship by the school after impressing then-recruiting coordinator Gerad Parker with his physicality in a pickup basketball game.

== College career ==
Hopkins redshirted his true freshman season at Purdue. He had 10 receptions for 183 and four touchdowns while serving as the second string tight end as a redshirt freshman and caught three passes for 80 yards and two touchdowns against Iowa. Hopkins remained the second-string tight end for Purdue as a redshirt sophomore, but finished the season with 25 receptions for 349 yards (both the highest among Purdue's tight ends) and three touchdowns. As a redshirt junior, Hopkins finished third on the team with 34 receptions and 583 receiving yards with two touchdowns and was named honorable mention All-Big Ten Conference.

Hopkins entered his redshirt senior season on the watchlist for the Mackey Award. He was named the John Mackey Award Tight End of the Week after catching six passes for 84 yards and a touchdown in the season opener against Vanderbilt on August 30, 2019, and again after posting 10 receptions for 140 yards against Maryland on October 12. Hopkins finished the season with 61 receptions for 830 yards and seven touchdowns and was named first-team All-Big Ten, the Kwalick–Clark Tight End of the Year and a semifinalist for the Mackey Award. He finished his collegiate career with 130 catches for 1,945 and 16 touchdowns. Hopkins was named a second-team All-American by CBS Sports, Sports Illustrated, and USA Today.

== Professional career ==
Pre-draft measurables
Height	Weight	Arm length	Hand span	40-yard dash	10-yard split	20-yard split	20-yard shuttle	Three-cone drill	Vertical jump	Broad jump	Bench press
6 ft 3 7/8 in (1.93 m)	245 lb (111 kg)	32 1/8 in (0.82 m)	10 1/8 in (0.26 m)	4.66 s	1.61 s	2.70 s	4.28 s	7.25 s	33.5 in (0.85 m)	9 ft 8 in (2.95 m)	21 reps
All values from NFL Combine

On April 25, 2020, Hopkins was selected by the Los Angeles Rams in the fourth round (136th overall) in the 2020 NFL draft. He made his NFL debut on October 26, 2020, in a 24–10 win over the Chicago Bears. Hopkins played in five games, mostly on special teams, as a rookie and did not catch a pass.

Hopkins played in five games during the 2021 regular season, catching one pass for nine yards. He also played in three of the Rams' four playoff games and saw significant playing time in the team's 23–20 win over the Cincinnati Bengals in Super Bowl LVI after starter Tyler Higbee was ruled out for the game and backup Kendall Blanton suffered a shoulder injury in the first half. Hopkins caught four passes for 47 yards in the game.

On September 21, 2022, Hopkins was suspended for three games for violating the NFL's policy of substance abuse.

== Personal life ==
Hopkins is the son of former Houston Oilers/Tennessee Titans offensive tackle Brad Hopkins.
