= Paddy Fisher =

American football player (born 1998)

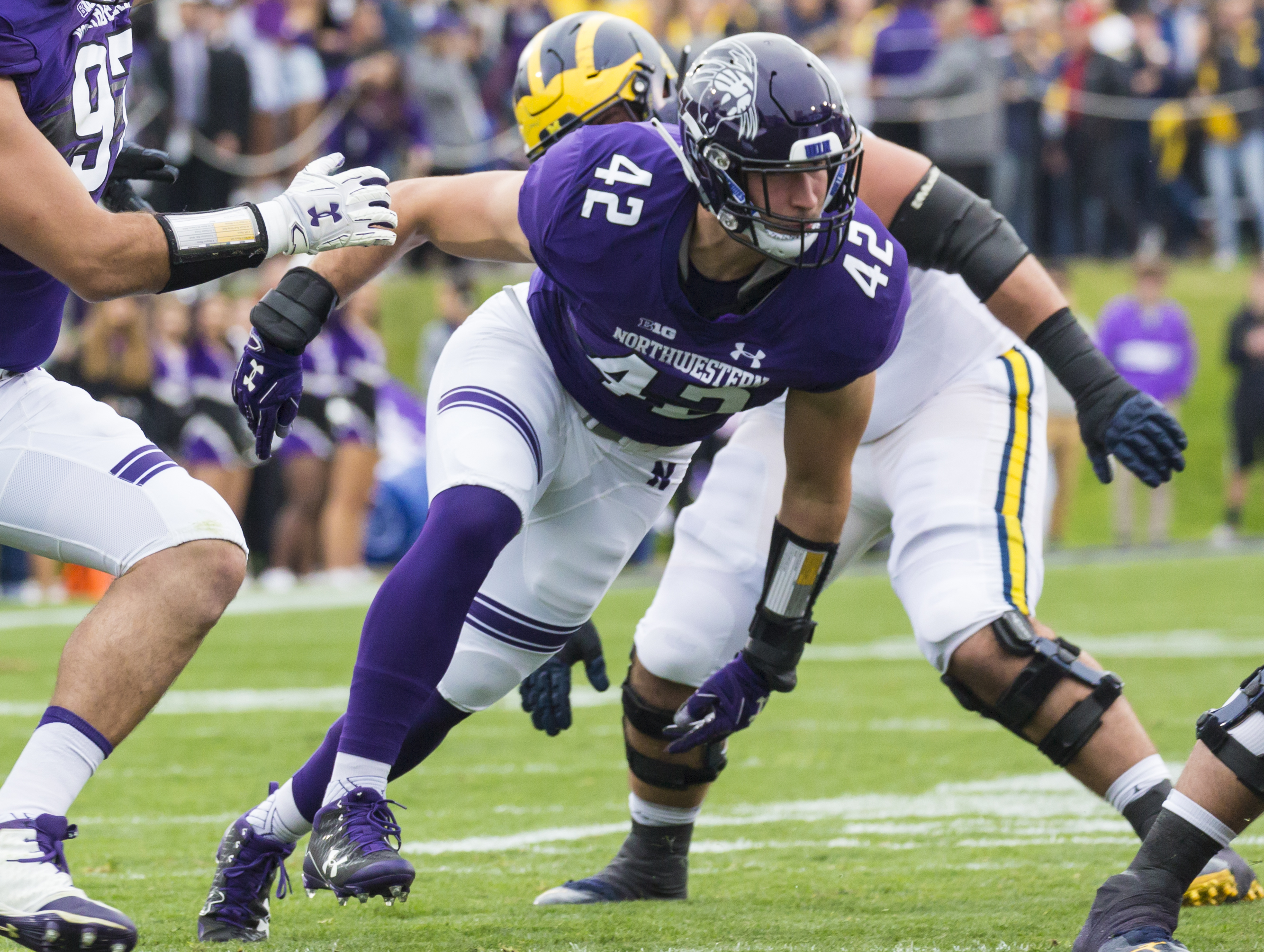
- Fisher with the Northwestern Wildcats in 2018

No. 42
- Position: Linebacker

Personal information
- Born: January 22, 1998 (age 28); Houston, Texas, U.S.
- Listed height: 6 ft 3 in (1.91 m)
- Listed weight: 240 lb (109 kg)

Career information
- High school: Katy (Katy, Texas)
- College: Northwestern
- NFL draft: 2021: undrafted

Career history
- Carolina Panthers (2021)*; Los Angeles Chargers (2021)*; Michigan Panthers (2023)
- * Offseason or practice squad member only

Awards and highlights
- Lott IMPACT Trophy (2020); Second-team All-American (2020); Big Ten Linebacker of the Year (2020); 2× First-team All-Big Ten (2018, 2020); 2× Second-team All-Big Ten (2017, 2019)

Padriac William Fisher (born January 22, 1998) is an American former professional football linebacker. He played college football for the Northwestern Wildcats, where he was a four-time All-Big Ten selection.

== Early life ==
Fisher attended and played high school football at Katy High School in Katy, Texas. As a senior in 2015, Fisher earned All-State and All-District honors after leading Katy to a Class 6A Division II State Championship and the No. 1 ranking in the nation, according to MaxPreps. Over the course of his varsity career, he tallied 350 tackles, 25 tackles for loss, eight sacks, and eight forced fumbles.

=== Recruiting ===
Fisher was a consensus three-star recruit and received a dozen scholarship offers, from Baylor, Houston, Wisconsin, and Northwestern, among others. Fisher committed to Northwestern on June 30, 2015, signed his letter of intent on National Signing Day in February 2016, and enrolled in June.

College recruiting
Name	Hometown	School	Height	Weight	Commit date
Paddy Fisher; LB	Katy, Texas	Katy High School	6 ft 2 in (1.88 m)	225 lb (102 kg)	Jun 30, 2015
Paddy Fisher; LB	Recruit ratings: Rivals: 247Sports:				
Overall recruit ranking: Rivals: N/A (LB), N/A (TX) 247Sports: 57 (LB), 169 (TX)
Note: In many cases, Scout, Rivals, 247Sports, On3, and ESPN may conflict in their listings of height and weight.; In these cases, the average was taken. ESPN grades are on a 100-point scale.; Sources: "2016 Team Ranking". Rivals.com.

== College career ==
Fisher redshirted the 2016 season. In the 2017 season, Fisher earned Freshman All-America honors from the FWAA and was named the Big Ten Freshman Defensive Player of the Year by the Big Ten Network after recording 113 tackles, nine tackles for loss, four forced fumbles, and one interception. In 2018 as a redshirt sophomore, Fisher finished with 116 tackles, 5 tackles for loss, and four forced fumbles and an interception to earn nominations to the Big Ten First-team and the Associated Press All-America Third-team. The next year in 2019, Fisher registered 88 tackles, six tackles for loss, as well as one interception and one forced fumble in 12 games.

=== Career statistics ===
Northwestern Wildcats career statistics
Year	Team	GP	Tackles				Sacks	Pass defense		Fumbles		Safeties	TDs
Year	Team	GP	Solo	Ast	Total	TFL	Sk	Int	PD	FF	FR	Safeties	TDs
2016	Northwestern	0	--	--	--	--	--	--	--	--	--	--	--
2017	Northwestern	13	65	46	111	9.0	0	1	3	4	0	0	0
2018	Northwestern	14	63	53	116	5.0	1	1	2	4	0	0	0
2019	Northwestern	12	39	49	88	6.0	1	1	3	1	0	0	0
2020	Northwestern	9	47	39	86	4.5	0	1	2	1	1	0	0
Career		48	214	187	401	24.5	2	4	10	10	1	0	0

== Professional career ==
Pre-draft measurables
Height	Weight	Arm length	Hand span	40-yard dash	10-yard split	20-yard split	20-yard shuttle	Three-cone drill	Vertical jump	Broad jump	Bench press
6 ft 3 1/4 in (1.91 m)	240 lb (109 kg)	32 1/8 in (0.82 m)	9 1/2 in (0.24 m)	4.91 s	1.72 s	2.89 s	4.47 s	7.00 s	31.5 in (0.80 m)	9 ft 2 in (2.79 m)	20 reps
All values from Pro Day

=== Carolina Panthers ===
Fisher signed with the Carolina Panthers as an undrafted free agent on May 10, 2021. He was waived on August 28, 2021.

=== Los Angeles Chargers ===
On October 26, 2021, Fisher was signed to the Los Angeles Chargers practice squad. He was released on November 2, 2021.

=== Michigan Panthers ===
On August 22, 2022, Fisher signed with the Michigan Panthers of the United States Football League (USFL). He was not part of the roster after the 2024 UFL dispersal draft on January 15, 2024.
