= Cam Brown (linebacker) =

American football player (born 1998)

Cameron Brown
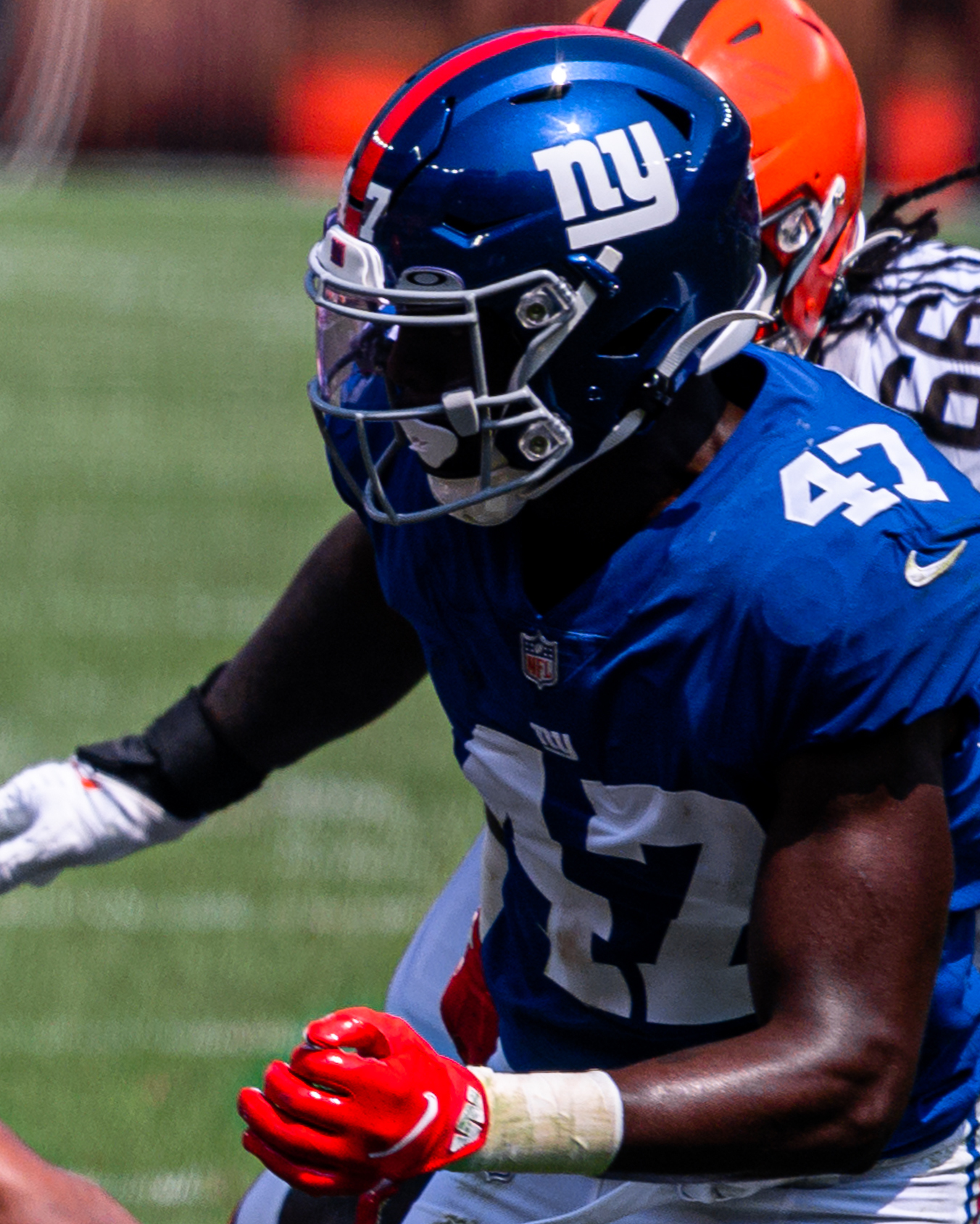
- Brown with the New York Giants in 2021

Profile
- Position: Linebacker

Personal information
- Born: April 1, 1998 (age 28); Silver Spring, Maryland, U.S.
- Listed height: 6 ft 5 in (1.96 m)
- Listed weight: 230 lb (104 kg)

Career information
- High school: Bullis School (Potomac, Maryland)
- College: Penn State (2016–2019)
- NFL draft: 2020: 6th round, 183rd overall pick

Career history
- New York Giants (2020–2023); Miami Dolphins (2024)

Awards and highlights
- Third-team All-Big Ten (2019)

Career NFL statistics as of 2024
- Total tackles: 35
- Forced fumbles: 2
- Stats at Pro Football Reference

Cameron Courtney Brown (born April 1, 1998) is an American professional football linebacker. He played college football for the Penn State Nittany Lions.

== Early life ==
Brown began his high school career at James Hubert Blake High School in Silver Spring, Maryland before transferring to Bullis School in Potomac, Maryland, where he played high school football as a linebacker. He graduated in the Class of 2016.

== College career ==
At Penn State, Brown played in 51 total games, with 26 starts. Brown was a team captain as a senior and recorded 72 tackles, 5.5 for a loss, 2 sacks, and 4 passes defensed. He earned Third-team All-Big Ten Conference honors.

== Professional career ==
Pre-draft measurables
Height	Weight	Arm length	Hand span	Wingspan	40-yard dash	10-yard split	20-yard split	Vertical jump	Broad jump	Bench press
6 ft 5 1/4 in (1.96 m)	233 lb (106 kg)	34 in (0.86 m)	9 1/2 in (0.24 m)	6 ft 6 7/8 in (2.00 m)	4.72 s	1.63 s	2.80 s	35.5 in (0.90 m)	10 ft 3 in (3.12 m)	16 reps
All values from NFL Combine

=== New York Giants ===
Brown was selected by the New York Giants in the sixth round with the 183rd pick in the 2020 NFL draft.

On September 25, 2021, Brown was placed on injured reserve with a hamstring injury. He was activated on October 16.

=== Miami Dolphins ===
On April 17, 2024, Brown signed with the Miami Dolphins. He was placed on injured reserve on August 12.

== Personal life ==
Brown is the son of Desmond Brown and Susan Giscombe. He has two brothers, D. Greyson and Brandon and two sisters, Simone and Candice.

His cousin André Davis, was a wide receiver at Virginia Tech and for nine seasons in the NFL.
