= K. J. Hamler =

American football player (born 1999)

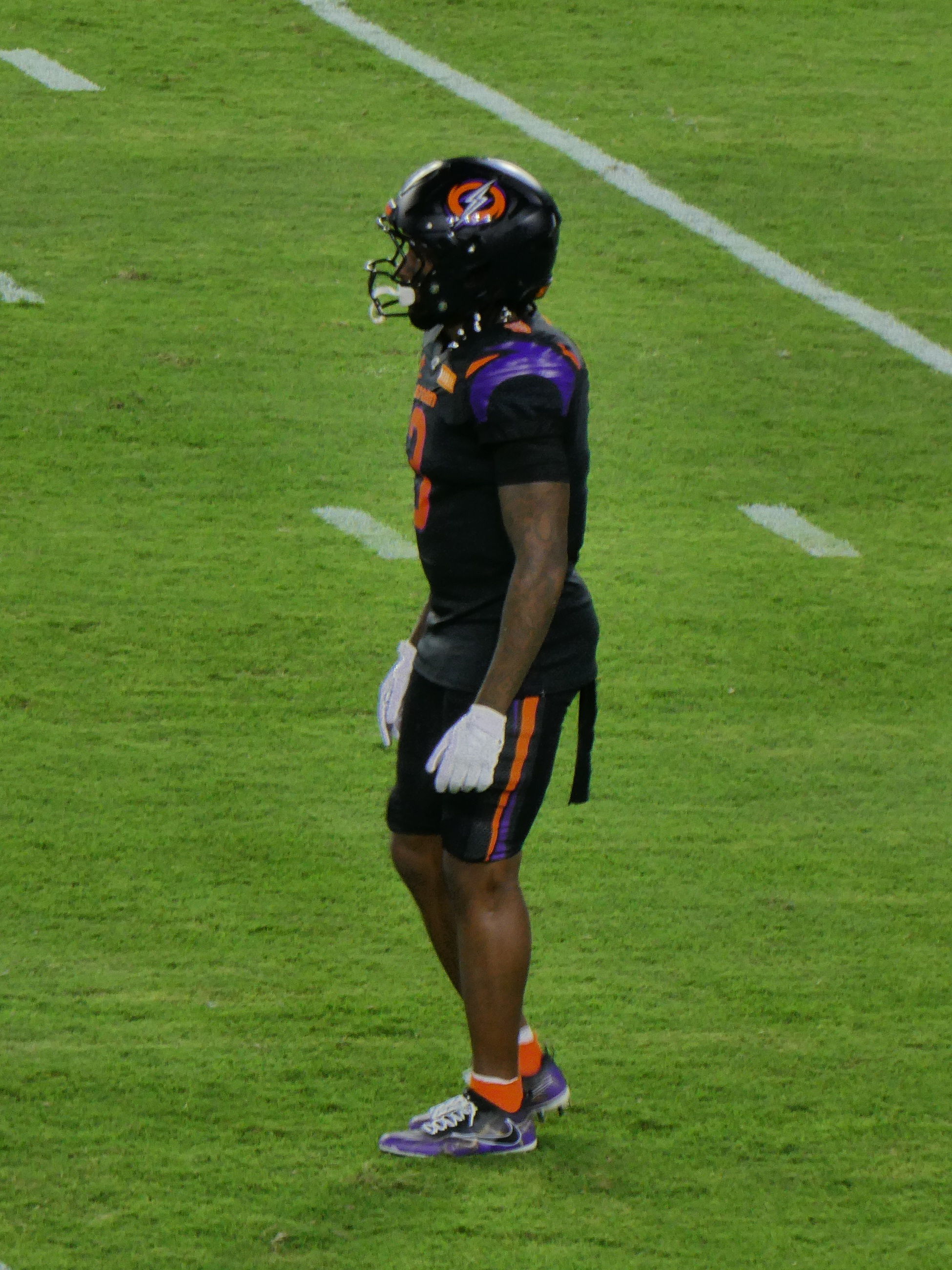
- Hamler with the Orlando Storm in 2026

No. 3 – Orlando Storm
- Position: Wide receiver

Personal information
- Born: July 8, 1999 (age 27); Pontiac, Michigan, U.S.
- Listed height: 5 ft 9 in (1.75 m)
- Listed weight: 178 lb (81 kg)

Career information
- High school: St. Mary's Preparatory (Orchard Lake Village, Michigan)
- College: Penn State (2017–2019)
- NFL draft: 2020: 2nd round, 46th overall pick

Career history
- Denver Broncos (2020–2022); Indianapolis Colts (2023)*; Buffalo Bills (2024–2025)*; Orlando Storm (2026–present)
- * Offseason or practice squad member only

Awards and highlights
- Second-team All-Big Ten (2019)

Career NFL statistics
- Receptions: 42
- Receiving yards: 620
- Receiving touchdowns: 3
- Stats at Pro Football Reference

Kahlee Jacoby Hamler (born July 8, 1999) is an American professional football wide receiver for the Orlando Storm of the United Football League (UFL). He played college football for the Penn State Nittany Lions.

== Early life ==
Hamler moved from his hometown, Pontiac, Michigan, to Florida to play his final year of high school football as a senior at IMG Academy. Before his first career game at IMG Academy, he tore his ACL. Prior to transferring to IMG Academy, Hamler was a two-year letterman at St. Mary's Preparatory School in Orchard Lake, Michigan. He was rated as a four-star prospect by ESPN, Rivals and Scout and a three star prospect by 247Sports. He also ran track for two seasons.

== College career ==
=== 2017 season ===
Hamler redshirted as a freshman at Penn State due to suffering a torn ACL the previous year.

=== 2018 season ===
In the first game of his collegiate career against Appalachian State, Hamler returned a kickoff 52 yards with less than two minutes on the clock to help spark Penn State's game-tying drive. He capped the drive off with a 15-yard touchdown reception with under a minute remaining, ending the game with 3 catches for 67 yards and a touchdown. Against Ohio State, Hamler was awarded Big Ten Conference Freshman of the Week honors after recording four receptions for 138 yards, including a 93-yard touchdown. Through five games, Hamler recorded 13 receptions for 308 yards and four touchdowns in his first season as a collegiate athlete.

=== 2019 season ===
In the 2019 season, Hamler recorded 56 receptions for 904 receiving yards and eight receiving touchdowns.

== Professional career ==
Pre-draft measurables
Height	Weight	Arm length	Hand span	Wingspan	Bench press	Wonderlic
5 ft 8 5/8 in (1.74 m)	178 lb (81 kg)	30 3/4 in (0.78 m)	9 3/8 in (0.24 m)	6 ft 0 1/2 in (1.84 m)	15 reps	15
All values from NFL Combine

=== Denver Broncos ===
==== 2020 season ====
Hamler was selected by the Denver Broncos with the 46th overall pick in the second round of the 2020 NFL draft.

In Week 2, Hamler made his NFL debut and recorded three receptions for 48 receiving yards in a 26–21 loss to the Pittsburgh Steelers. In Week 8 against the Los Angeles Chargers, Hamler recorded his first career touchdown catch with no time remaining on the clock to help the Broncos win the game 31–30. In Week 14 against the Carolina Panthers, Hamler recorded two receptions for 86 yards and two touchdowns during the 32–27 victory. On January 2, 2021, Hamler was placed on injured reserve due to a hamstring injury. He finished his rookie season with 30 catches for 381 yards and three touchdowns.

==== 2021 season ====
Trying to shake off the hamstring issues that plagued his rookie season, Hamler began training camp of his sophomore season in a crowded receiving corps. He caught a touchdown from Drew Lock during the Broncos' first preseason game against the Minnesota Vikings. He suffered a torn ACL in Week 3 and was placed on season-ending injured reserve on September 28, 2021.

==== 2022 season ====
On December 3, 2022, Hamler was placed on injured reserve with a hamstring injury. He played in seven games and recorded seven receptions for 165 yards in the 2022 season. On March 23, 2023, Hamler was ruled out for 4–6 months after undergoing surgery to repair a partially torn pectoral muscle he suffered while training on his own.

On July 31, 2023, Hamler announced he was diagnosed with pericarditis. Hamler was then waived by the Denver Broncos with a non-football illness designation.

=== Indianapolis Colts ===
Hamler signed with the practice squad of the Indianapolis Colts on September 30, 2023. He was not signed to a reserve/future contract after the season and thus became a free agent upon the expiration of his practice squad contract.

=== Buffalo Bills ===
Hamler signed a reserve/future contract with the Buffalo Bills on January 20, 2024. He was released as part of final roster cuts on August 27 and signed back to the practice squad the following day.

He signed a reserve/future contract on January 28, 2025. On August 26, Hamler was released by the Bills as part of final roster cuts. He was heavily featured on the 2025 season of Hard Knocks, which covered the Bills.

=== Orlando Storm ===
On January 29, 2026, Hamler signed with the Orlando Storm of the United Football League (UFL).

== Career statistics ==
Legend
**Bold**	Career high

=== NFL ===
Year	Team	Games		Receiving				
Year	Team	GP	GS	Rec	Yds	Avg	Lng	TD
2020	DEN	13	4	**30**	**381**	12.7	49	**3**
2021	DEN	3	2	5	74	14.8	28	0
2022	DEN	7	0	7	165	**23.6**	**55**	0
Career		23	6	42	620	14.8	55	3

=== UFL ===
Year	Team	Games		Receiving				
Year	Team	GP	GS	Rec	Yds	Avg	Lng	TD
2026	ORL	7	7	23	317	13.8	41	3
Career		7	7	23	317	13.8	41	3

=== College ===
Year	Team	Games		Receiving				
Year	Team	GP	GS	Rec	Yds	Avg	Lng	TD
2018	PST	13	13	42	754	**18.0**	**93**	5
2019	PST	13	13	**56**	**904**	16.1	58	**8**
Career		26	26	98	1,658	16.9	93	13
