= Mike Onwenu =

American football player (born 1997)

Michael Onwenu
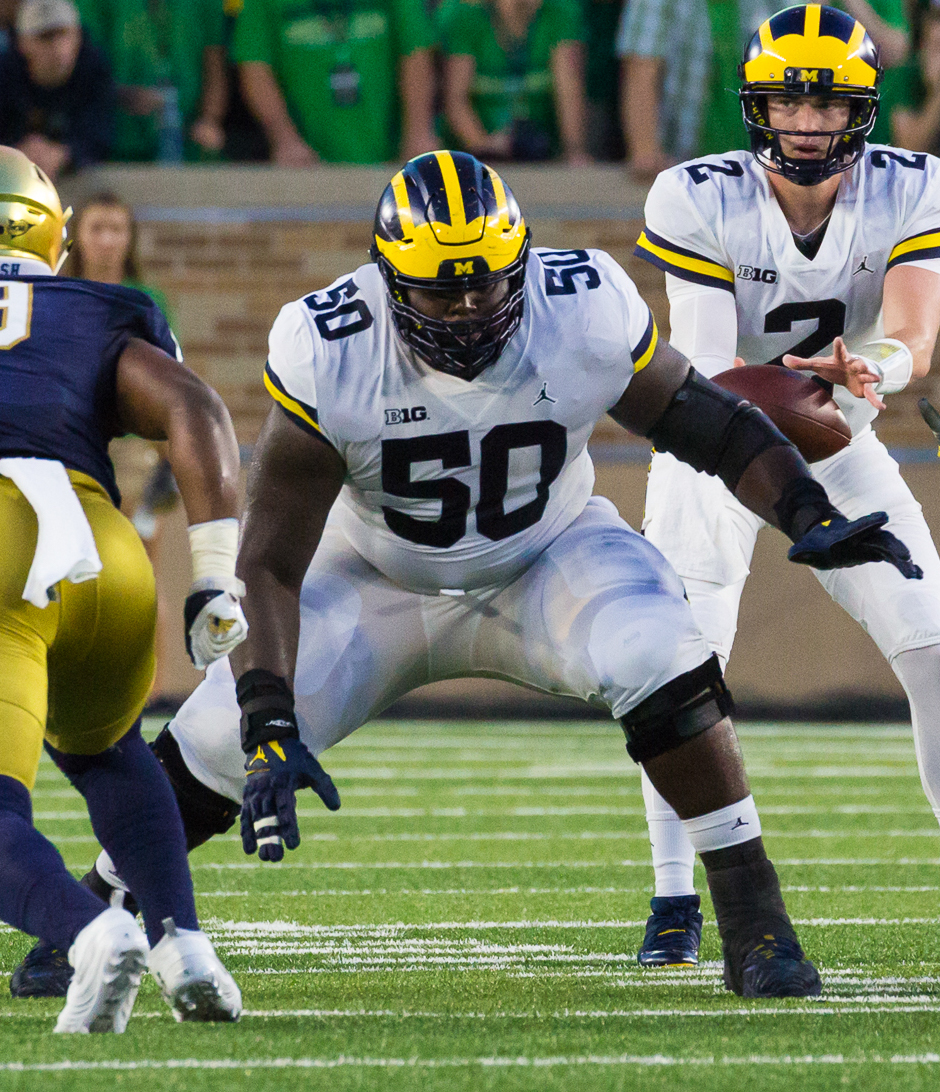
- Onwenu with the Michigan Wolverines in 2018

No. 71 – New England Patriots
- Position: Guard
- Roster status: Injured reserve

Personal information
- Born: December 10, 1997 (age 28); Detroit, Michigan, U.S.
- Listed height: 6 ft 3 in (1.91 m)
- Listed weight: 350 lb (159 kg)

Career information
- High school: Cass Technical (Detroit)
- College: Michigan (2016–2019)
- NFL draft: 2020: 6th round, 182nd overall pick

Career history
- New England Patriots (2020–present)

Awards and highlights
- PFWA All-Rookie Team (2020); 2× Third-team All-Big Ten (2018, 2019)

Career NFL statistics as of Week 1, 2026
- Games played: 99
- Games started: 91
- Stats at Pro Football Reference

Michael Justice Nnamezie Onwenu (/oʊˈwɛnuː/ oh-WEN-oo) (born December 10, 1997) is an American professional football guard for the New England Patriots of the National Football League (NFL). He played college football for the Michigan Wolverines, and was selected by the Patriots in the sixth round of the 2020 NFL draft.

== College career ==
Playing at Cass Technical High School, Onwenu was the top-ranked recruit in the state of Michigan for his class and committed to Michigan over Alabama, Ohio State and others. He played on both the offensive line and defensive line his freshman year; he spent the final three years of his career at right guard, starting in his junior and senior years and earning third-team all-Big Ten Conference honors for both seasons.

== Professional career ==
Pre-draft measurables
Height	Weight	Arm length	Hand span	Wingspan	Bench press
6 ft 2 5/8 in (1.90 m)	344 lb (156 kg)	34 3/8 in (0.87 m)	10 1/2 in (0.27 m)	6 ft 10 in (2.08 m)	26 reps
All values from NFL Combine

=== New England Patriots ===
Onwenu was selected by the New England Patriots in the sixth round (182nd overall) of the 2020 NFL draft.

During the early portion of his rookie season, Onwenu played across the offensive line after injuries affected the normal lineup; Onwenu took snaps as a sixth offensive lineman/jumbo tight end, at right tackle, and at both guard positions. After starting the first two games as a sixth offensive lineman, Onwenu made his first career start at left guard against the Las Vegas Raiders. He helped the Patriots amass 250 rushing yards in a 36–20 victory. Despite alternating between guard and tackle, Onwenu finished the year ranked as one of the best offensive linemen in the NFL and started in all 16 of the Patriots' games. He was named to the PFWA All-Rookie Team.

For the 2021 season, following the departure of left guard Joe Thuney and the acquisition of right tackle Trent Brown, Onwenu moved to left guard. However, Onwenu struggled and was benched in favor of backup guard Ted Karras; the former finished the season as a backup guard and was often used as a sixth offensive lineman.

The 2022 season was a bounce-back season for Onwenu; he was moved to right guard when first-round rookie Cole Strange was named starting left guard, and Karras had signed with the Cincinnati Bengals. Onwenu impressed at the position, being PFF's No. 4 ranked guard. He finished the season playing in 17 games, all of which he started in.

For the 2023 season, Onwenu was named starting right tackle after Isaiah Wynn signed with division rival Miami Dolphins; fourth-round rookie Sidy Sow took over as the starting right guard.

On March 14, 2024, Onwenu signed a three-year, $57 million contract extension with the Patriots. After starting the first four games at right tackle, Onwenu switched back to right guard due to multiple injuries to the offensive line. He started in Super Bowl LX, a 29–13 loss to the Seattle Seahawks.

In the 2026 season, during the team's Week 2 matchup against the Pittsburgh Steelers, Onwenu suffered a serious right ankle injury after getting tangled up with T.J. Watt. He was carted off the field; later x-rays revealed an ankle fracture.

== Personal life ==
Onwenu is of Nigerian descent; his parents were born in Nigeria but later moved to the United States.
