= Joe Gaziano =

American football player (born 1996)

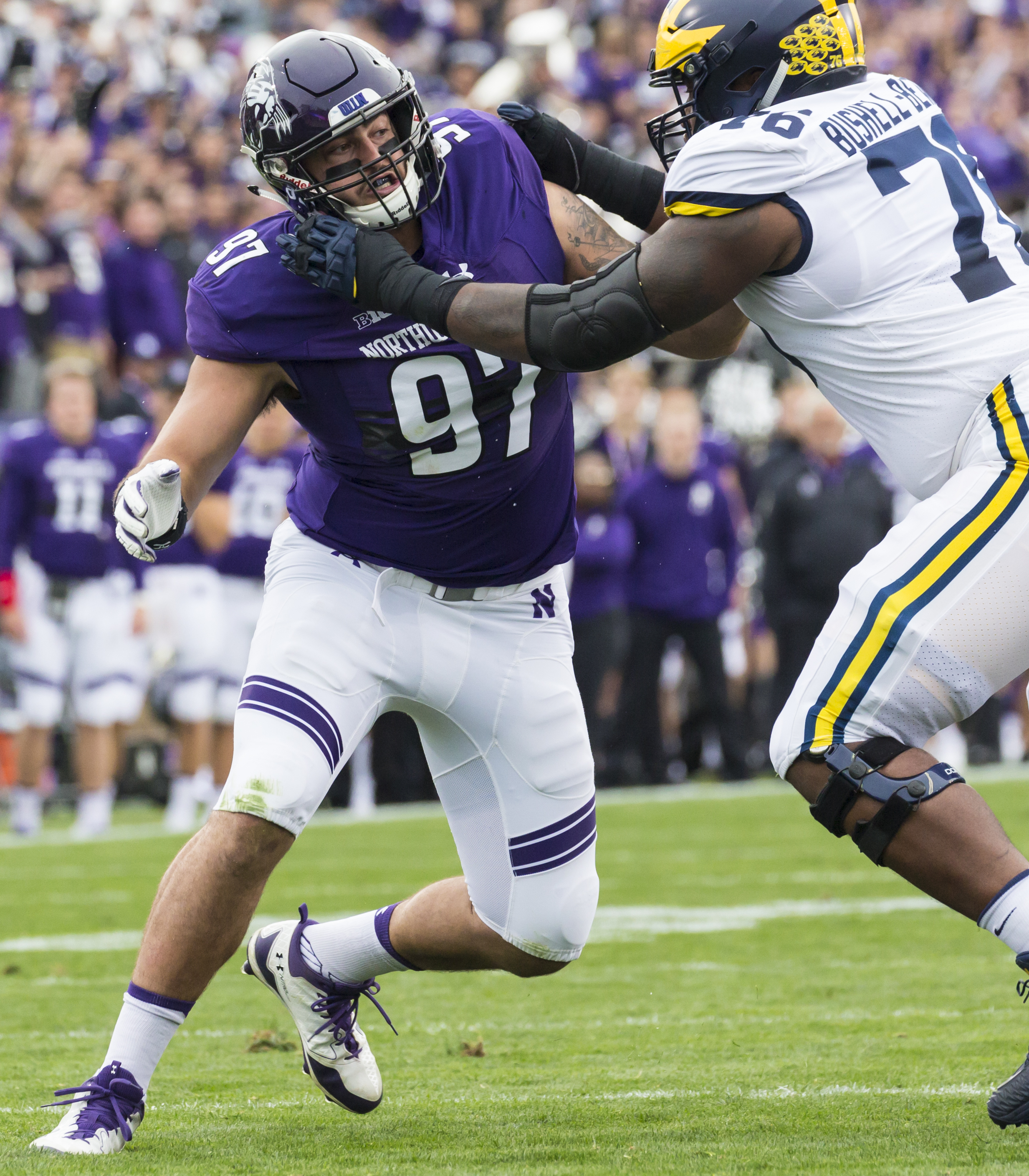
- Gaziano with the Northwestern Wildcats in 2018

Profile
- Position: Defensive end

Personal information
- Born: September 27, 1996 (age 30); Boston, Massachusetts, U.S.
- Listed height: 6 ft 4 in (1.93 m)
- Listed weight: 280 lb (127 kg)

Career information
- High school: Xaverian Brothers (Westwood, Massachusetts)
- College: Northwestern (2015–2019)
- NFL draft: 2020: undrafted

Career history
- Los Angeles Chargers (2020–2022); Atlanta Falcons (2023); Jacksonville Jaguars (2024)*; Tennessee Titans (2025)*
- * Offseason or practice squad member only

Awards and highlights
- First-team All-Big Ten (2019); 2× Second-team All-Big Ten (2017, 2018)

Career NFL statistics as of 2023
- Total tackles: 24
- Sacks: 1
- Pass deflections: 1
- Stats at Pro Football Reference

Joseph Matthew Gaziano (born September 27, 1996) is an American professional football defensive end. He played college football for the Northwestern Wildcats. He has been a member of the Los Angeles Chargers, Atlanta Falcons, Jacksonville Jaguars and Tennessee Titans.

== Early life ==
Gaziano grew up in Scituate, Massachusetts and attended Xaverian Brothers High School, where he played football and lacrosse. He was named the Massachusetts Gatorade Player of the Year as a senior after recording 21 tackles for loss and 16 sacks.

== College career ==
Gaziano was a member of the Northwestern Wildcats for five seasons, redshirting his true freshman year. He finished his collegiate career with school records of 30 sacks and 10 forced fumbles and second all-time with 48.5 tackles for loss with 153 total tackles, four fumbles recovered, 15 passes defended and a blocked kick in 52 games played.

== Professional career ==
Pre-draft measurables
Height	Weight	Arm length	Hand span	40-yard dash	10-yard split	20-yard split	20-yard shuttle	Three-cone drill	Vertical jump	Broad jump	Bench press
6 ft 4 1/4 in (1.94 m)	282 lb (128 kg)	32 5/8 in (0.83 m)	9 1/2 in (0.24 m)	5.10 s	1.68 s	2.85 s	4.61 s	7.50 s	32.5 in (0.83 m)	9 ft 3 in (2.82 m)	25 reps
All values from Pro Day

=== Los Angeles Chargers ===
Gaziano was signed by the Los Angeles Chargers as an undrafted free agent on April 25, 2020. He was waived at the end of training camp during final roster cuts on September 5, and signed to the practice squad on September 10. He was elevated to the active roster on October 12 and December 26 for the team's Weeks 5 and 16 games against the New Orleans Saints and Denver Broncos, reverting to the practice squad after each game. On January 1, 2021, Gaziano was signed to the active roster.

On August 31, Gaziano was waived by the Chargers and re-signed to the practice squad the next day. He was activated for the Chargers' Week 2 game against the Cowboys, and signed to the active roster on October 1.

On August 30, 2022, Gaziano was again waived by the Chargers and re-signed to the practice squad the next day. Following injuries to starting defensive lineman, he was promoted to the active roster on November 19. After starting five games, he suffered a groin injury in a win over the Tennessee Titans and was placed on injured reserve on December 21.

=== Atlanta Falcons ===
On March 27, 2023, Gaziano signed a one-year contract with the Atlanta Falcons.

=== Jacksonville Jaguars ===
On August 16, 2024, Gaziano signed with the Jacksonville Jaguars. He was released on August 27, and re-signed to the practice squad the following day. On December 31, the Jaguars re-signed Gaziano to their practice squad.

=== Tennessee Titans ===
On August 7, 2025, Gaziano signed with the Tennessee Titans. On August 25, he was released as part of final roster cuts.
