= 2019 Illinois Fighting Illini football team =

American college football season

2019 Illinois Fighting Illini football

Redbox Bowl, L 20–35 vs. California
- Conference: Big Ten Conference
- West Division
- Record: 6–7 (4–5 Big Ten)
- Head coach: Lovie Smith (4th season)
- Offensive coordinator: Rod Smith (2nd season)
- Offensive scheme: Multiple
- Base defense: 4–3
- Home stadium: Memorial Stadium

Uniform
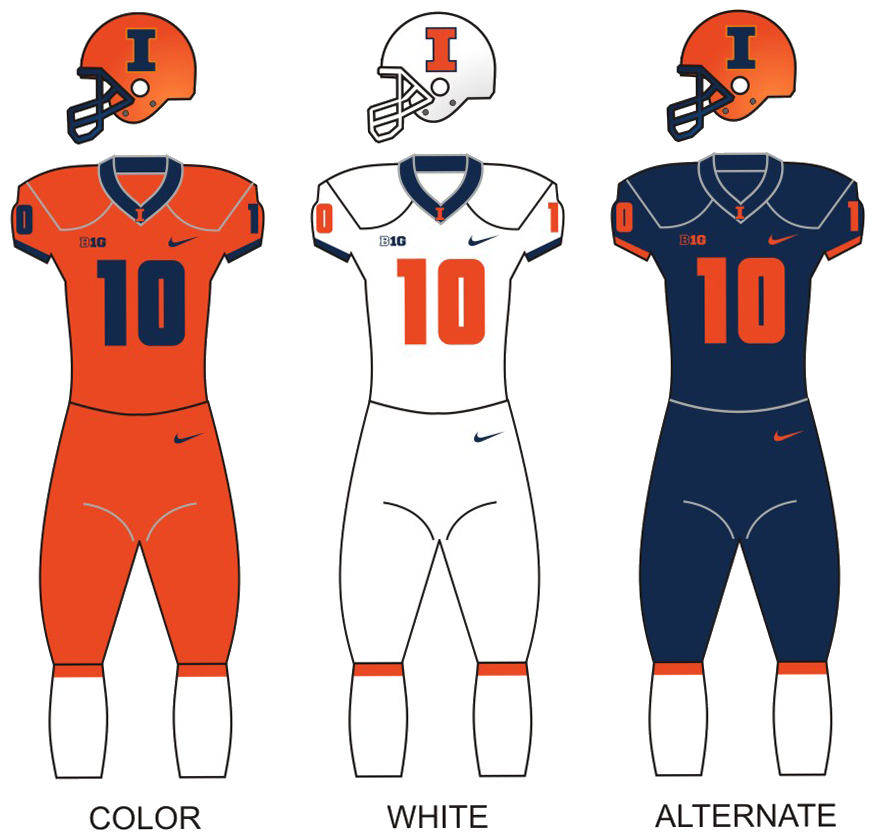

2019 Big Ten Conference football standings
	Conf.			Overall
Team	W		L	W		L
East Division
No. 3 Ohio State xy$^	9	–	0	13	–	1
No. 9 Penn State	7	–	2	11	–	2
No. 18 Michigan	6	–	3	9	–	4
Indiana	5	–	4	8	–	5
Michigan State	4	–	5	7	–	6
Maryland	1	–	8	3	–	9
Rutgers	0	–	9	2	–	10
West Division
No. 11 Wisconsin xy	7	–	2	10	–	4
No. 10 Minnesota x	7	–	2	11	–	2
No. 15 Iowa	6	–	3	10	–	3
Illinois	4	–	5	6	–	7
Purdue	3	–	6	4	–	8
Nebraska	3	–	6	5	–	7
Northwestern	1	–	8	3	–	9
Championship: Ohio State 34, Wisconsin 21
^ – College Football Playoff participant; $ – Conference champion; x – Division champion/co-champions; y – Championship game participant; Rankings from AP Poll

The 2019 Illinois Fighting Illini football team was an American football team that represented the University of Illinois Urbana-Champaign as a member of the Big Ten Conference during the 2019 NCAA Division I FBS football season. In their fourth season under head coach Lovie Smith, the Fighting Illini compiled a 6–7 record (4–5 in conference games), finished in fourth place out of seven teams in the Big Ten's West Division, and outscored opponents by a total of 347 to 340. They concluded the season with a loss to California in the 2019 Redbox Bowl.

The team's statistical leaders included quarterback Brandon Peters (1,884 passing yards, 55.3% completions percentage), running back Reggie Corbin (675 rushing yards, 4.7 yards per attempt), wide receiver Josh Imatorbhebhe (33 receptions for 634 yards), and kicker James McCourt (81 points scored, 42 of 43 extra points, 13 of 19 field goals). McLaughlin was the only Illinois player to receive first-team honors on the 2018 All-Big Ten Conference football team. Linebacker Dele Harding and punter Blake Hayes received first-team honors on the 2019 All-Big Ten Conference football team.

The team played its home games at Memorial Stadium in Champaign, Illinois.

== Preseason ==
=== Preseason Big Ten poll ===
Although the Big Ten Conference has not held an official preseason poll since 2010, Cleveland.com has polled sports journalists representing all member schools as a de facto preseason media poll since 2011. For the 2019 poll, Illinois was projected to finish in last in the West Division.

== Schedule ==
Illinois' 2019 schedule began with three non-conference games, starting with Akron of the Mid-American Conference at home, a road game to UConn of the American Athletic Conference, and then at home again for Eastern Michigan of the Mid-American Conference. In Big Ten Conference play, Illinois played all members of the West Division and draws Michigan, Rutgers, and Michigan State from the East Division.

Date	Time	Opponent	Site	TV	Result	Attendance
August 31	11:00 a.m.	Akron*	Memorial Stadium; Champaign, IL	BTN	W 42–3	30,654
September 7	2:30 p.m.	at UConn*	Rentschler Field; East Hartford, CT	CBSSN	W 31–23	23,108
September 14	11:00 a.m.	Eastern Michigan*	Memorial Stadium; Champaign, IL	BTN	L 31–34	34,759
September 21	7:00 p.m.	Nebraska	Memorial Stadium; Champaign, IL	BTN	L 38–42	44,512
October 5	2:30 p.m.	at Minnesota	TCF Bank Stadium; Minneapolis, MN	BTN	L 17–40	39,341
October 12	12:00 p.m.	No. 16 Michigan	Memorial Stadium; Champaign, IL (rivalry)	ABC	L 25–42	37,275
October 19	11:00 a.m.	No. 6 Wisconsin^{†}	Memorial Stadium; Champaign, IL	BTN	W 24–23	37,363
October 26	11:00 a.m.	at Purdue	Ross–Ade Stadium; West Lafayette, IN (rivalry)	BTN	W 24–6	38,735
November 2	2:30 p.m.	Rutgers	Memorial Stadium; Champaign, IL	BTN	W 38–10	35,652
November 9	2:30 p.m.	at Michigan State	Spartan Stadium; East Lansing, MI	FS1	W 37–34	63,370
November 23	11:00 a.m.	at No. 17 Iowa	Kinnick Stadium; Iowa City, IA	BTN	L 10–19	58,331
November 30	11:00 a.m.	Northwestern	Memorial Stadium; Champaign, IL (rivalry)	FS1	L 10–29	35,895
December 30	3:00 p.m.	vs. California*	Levi's Stadium; Santa Clara, CA (Redbox Bowl)	FOX	L 20–35	34,177
*Non-conference game; ^{†}Homecoming; Rankings from AP Poll and CFP Rankings (after November 5) released prior to game; All times are in Central time

== Game summaries ==
=== Akron ===
	1	2	3	4	Total
Zips	3	0	0	0	3
Fighting Illini	14	14	14	0	42

=== At UConn ===
	1	2	3	4	Total
Fighting Illini	0	24	7	0	31
Huskies	10	3	7	3	23

=== Eastern Michigan ===
	1	2	3	4	Total
Eagles	14	9	0	11	34
Fighting Illini	17	0	0	14	31

=== Nebraska ===
	1	2	3	4	Total
Cornhuskers	7	7	13	15	42
Fighting Illini	14	7	14	3	38

=== At Minnesota ===
	1	2	3	4	Total
Fighting Illini	7	3	7	0	17
Golden Gophers	3	13	14	10	40

=== Michigan ===
	1	2	3	4	Total
No. 16 Wolverines	14	14	0	14	42
Fighting Illini	0	7	10	8	25

=== Wisconsin ===
	1	2	3	4	Total
No. 6 Badgers	7	6	7	3	23
Fighting Illini	0	7	7	10	24

==== “KAM'S Miracle” ====
On October 19, during the Homecoming Weekend, the Fighting Illini upset the undefeated No. 6 ranked Wisconsin Badgers on a 39-yard game-winning field goal by James McCourt. It was Illinois' first win against a top ranked team since 2007, when they had upset No. 1 ranked Ohio State in Columbus with a score of 28–21.

The weekend also marked the last nights of beloved campus bar KAM'S. KAM'S had been a popular bar on campus since 1975. In September 2019 it was announced that KAM'S would be closing on Sunday night of Homecoming 2019. The victory coincided with this closing.

=== At Purdue ===
	1	2	3	4	Total
Fighting Illini	3	14	7	0	24
Boilermakers	0	0	0	6	6

=== Rutgers ===
	1	2	3	4	Total
Scarlet Knights	0	10	0	0	10
Fighting Illini	10	0	21	7	38

=== At Michigan State ===
	1	2	3	4	Total
Fighting Illini	3	7	0	27	37
Spartans	14	14	3	3	34

==== “The Comeback In East Lansing” ====
Illinois started the road game off rough, giving up 14 points and only scoring a field goal in the first quarter. By halftime, they were losing 28–10 and at one point in a 28–3 deficit in the second quarter. After Halftime, both teams struggled in the 3rd quarter, scoring only 3 combined points. But the comeback started in the 4th quarter on which the first play was an Illinois touchdown on a 46-yard Brandon Peters pass to wide receiver Josh Imatorbhebhe. Then on the next Illinois possession, Reggie Corbin ran it in the end zone from 6-yards out to make the score 31–24. On the next Spartans possession, Michigan State's quarterback Brian Lewerke couldn't handle a bad snap and Illinois recovered the fumble at Michigan State's 8-yard line. Peters then tried throwing the game tying touchdown pass but it was intercepted in the end zone by MSU. On the ensuing possession, Lewerke threw an interception to Illinois defender Sydney Brown for a 76-yard touchdown. But the score remained untied when Illinois kicker junior James McCourt missed the PAT to make it 31–30. Michigan State then drove down the field but only managed to kick a field goal to make the score 34–30, MSU leading with 3:17 remaining in the 4th. Illinois drove down the field, completing a 37-yard throw and catch by Peters to Imatorbhebhe and drove to the MSU 4-yard line. The Spartans defense then held and stopped the Illini on 4th and Goal but a defensive pass interference kept the game alive. Brandon Peters then completed a 6-yard, game-winning touchdown to tight end Daniel Barker with 5 seconds remaining. Illinois stopped Michigan State on the kickoff, sealing a Fighting Illini win. The victory clinched a bowl game for the Illini, their first since 2014.

=== At Iowa ===
	1	2	3	4	Total
Fighting Illini	7	0	0	3	10
No. 17 Hawkeyes	7	6	0	6	19

=== Northwestern ===
	1	2	3	4	Total
Wildcats	3	7	7	12	29
Fighting Illini	0	7	3	0	10

=== Vs. California ===
	1	2	3	4	Total
Golden Bears	7	14	7	7	35
Fighting Illini	10	3	0	7	20

== Personnel ==
=== Coaching staff ===
Staff as of April 17, 2019.

Name	Position	Consecutive season at Illinois in current position	Salary
Lovie Smith	Head coach/Defensive coordinator	4th	$4,000,000
Rod Smith	Offensive coordinator	2nd	$700,000
Michael Bellamy	Running backs coach	1st	$250,000
Andrew Hayes-Stoker	Wide receivers Coach	4th	$335,000
Bob McClain	Offensive line coach	1st	$310,000
Cory Patterson	Tight Ends coach	2nd	$275,000
Austin Clark	Defensive line coach	2nd	$275,000
Miles Smith	Linebackers coach	1st	$220,000
Keynodo Hudson	Cornerbacks coach	1st	$250,000
Gill Byrd	Safeties coach/Passing Game Coordinator	2nd	$300,000
Bob Ligashesky	Special Teams Coordinator	4th	$331,000

=== Roster ===
2019 Illinois Fighting Illini football team roster
Players
Coaches
Offense

Pos.	#	Name	Class
QB	1	Isaiah Williams	Fr
RB	2	Reggie Corbin	Sr
RB	3	Jakari Norwood	Fr
WR	4	Ricky Smalling	Jr
WR	5	Trevon Sidney	Jr
WR	6	Dominic Stampley	Jr
QB	7	Coran Taylor	Fr
WR	8	Casey Washington	Fr
WR	9	Josh Imatorbhebhe	Jr
TE	10	Justice Williams	Sr
WR	11	Carlos Sandy	So
QB	12	Matt Robinson	Fr
WR	13	Caleb Reams	Sr
WR	15	Trenard Davis	Sr
QB	16	Cam Miller	Jr
QB	18	Brandon Peters	Jr
WR	19	Dalevon Campbell	Fr
WR	20	Kyron Cumby	Fr
RB	21	Ra'Von Bonner	Jr
RB	22	Kenyon Sims	Fr
RB	23	Conner Lillig	So
RB	24	Nick Fedanzo	Fr
RB	25	Dre Brown	Sr
RB	26	Mike Epstein	Jr
RB	28	Chase Brown	So
TE	43	Griffin Moore	Fr
TE	48	Bryce Barnes	Fr
OL	52	Verdis Brown	Fr
OL	53	Kendrick Green	So
OL	54	Julian Pearl	Fr
OL	57	Evan Kirts	Fr
OL	58	Preston Engel	Fr
OL	59	Josh Plohr	Fr
OL	63	Alex Palczewski	Jr
OL	65	Doug Kramer	Jr
OL	66	Jordyn Slaughter	Fr
OL	68	Jake Stover	So
OL	70	Thomas Cronin	Fr
OL	72	Kievan Myers	Fr
OL	73	Jake Cerny	Jr
OL	74	Richie Petitbon	Sr
OL	75	Kurt Gavin	Jr
OL	79	Vederian Lowe	Jr
WR	80	Edwin Carter	Fr
TE	81	Griffin Palmer	Jr
TE	82	Luke Ford	So
TE	83	Bobby Walker	Sr
WR	84	Jordan Holmes	So
WR	85	Dylan Thomas	Fr
WR	86	Donny Navarro	Jr
TE	87	Daniel Barker	So
TE	89	Alex Pihlstrom	So

Defense

Pos.	#	Name	Class
LB	2	Derrick Smith (I)	Jr
DB	3	Marquez Beason	Fr
LB	5	Milo Eifler	Jr
DB	6	Tony Adams	Jr
DB	7	Stanley Green	Sr
DB	8	Nate Hobbs	Jr
LB	9	Dele Harding	Sr
LB	10	James Knight	Jr
DB	15	Delano Ware	So
DB	17	Kendall Smith	Jr
DB	20	Nick Walker	Jr
DB	21	Quan Martin	So
DB	22	Dylan Wyatt	So
DB	23	Joseph Thompson	Fr
LB	24	Dawson DeGroot	Jr
DB	25	Kerby Joseph	So
DB	27	Matthew Judd	Fr
DB	28	Nolan Bernat	Sr
DB	29	Christian Bobak	Jr
DB	30	Sydney Brown	So
DB	31	Devon Witherspoon	Fr
DB	32	Tailon Leitzsey	Jr
DL	33	Ezekiel Holmes	Fr
LB	34	Ryan Meed	Fr
LB	35	Jake Hansen	Jr
DB	36	Ben Schultz	Fr
LB	37	Mark Di Iorio	Fr
LB	40	Shammond Cooper	Fr
DB	42	Michael Marchese	Jr
LB	44	Tarique Barnes	Fr
LB	45	Khalan Tolson	So
LB	46	Alex McEachern	So
DL	47	Oluwole Betiku Jr.	Jr
DL	49	Seth Coleman	Fr
LB	51	Sean Coghlan	So
LB	52	Ayo Shogbonyo	Jr
DL	54	Marc Mondesir	Jr
DL	55	Jamal Milan	Sr
DL	69	Moses Okpala	Fr
DL	88	Keith Randolph Jr.	Fr
DL	90	Lere Oladipo	So
DL	91	Jamal Woods	So
DL	92	Isaiah Gay	Jr
DL	93	Calvin Avery	So
DL	95	Kenyon Jackson	Sr
DL	96	Tymir Oliver	Sr
DL	97	Bobby Roundtree	Jr
DL	98	Deon Pate	So
DL	99	Owen Carney Jr.	Jr

Special teams

Pos.	#	Name	Class
K	11	Caleb Griffin	Fr
P	14	Blake Hayes	Jr
K, P	17	James McCourt	Jr
LS	39	Aidan Hall	Fr
LS	41	Nolan Rossback	Fr
LS	56	Ethan Tabel	Jr

Head coach

- Lovie Smith – Defensive coordinator

Coordinators/assistant coaches

- Rod Smith – Offensive Coordinator / Quarterbacks
- Gill Byrd – Passing Game Coordinator / Safeties
- Bob Ligashesky – Special Teams Coordinator
- Mike Bellamy – Running Backs
- Austin Clark – Defensive Line
- Andrew Hayes-Stoker – Wide Receivers
- Keynodo Hudson – Cornerbacks
- Bob McClain – Offensive Line
- Cory Patterson – Tight Ends
- Miles Smith – Linebackers
- Rob Delaney – Graduate Assistant – Offense
- Zach Grant – Graduate Assistant – Offense
- Carson Hall – Graduate Assistant – Defense
- Brent Jackson – Graduate Assistant – Defense
- Peter Collins – Defensive Analyst
- Ilir Emini – Defensive Analyst
- Cody Gibson – Offensive Analyst
- Devin Holiday – Defensive Analyst
- Garrett Schwettman – Special Team Analyst
- Jake Ellsworth – Defensive Analyst
- Lou Hernandez – Head Strength & Conditioning Coach
- Tim Knox – Director of Football Operations
- Jake Zweig – Director of Man Development
- Patrick Embleton – Director of recruiting
- James Kirkland – Director of Player Personnel
- Joe Price – Director of High School Relations
- Cameron Skelding – Assistant Recruiting Coordinator
- Travis Perry – Director of Creative Content

Legend

- (C) Team captain
- (S) Suspended
- (I) Ineligible
- Injured
- Redshirt

Roster
Last update: September 20, 2019

=== Recruiting ===
College recruiting
Name	Hometown	School	Height	Weight	Commit date
Marquez Beason; CB	Duncanville, TX	Duncanville	5 ft 10 in (1.78 m)	174 lb (79 kg)	Mar 10, 2018
Marquez Beason; CB	Recruit ratings: Rivals: ESPN: (84)				
Isaiah Williams; ATH	St. Louis, MO	Trinity Catholic	5 ft 10 in (1.78 m)	170 lb (77 kg)	Mar 23, 2018
Isaiah Williams; ATH	Recruit ratings: Rivals: ESPN: (84)				
Shammond Cooper; OLB	St. Louis, MO	Trinity Catholic	6 ft 2 in (1.88 m)	205 lb (93 kg)	Jan 3, 2019
Shammond Cooper; OLB	Recruit ratings: Rivals: ESPN: (83)				
Moses Okpala; DE	St. Louis, MO	Ladue Horton Watkins	6 ft 6 in (1.98 m)	250 lb (110 kg)	Nov 2, 2018
Moses Okpala; DE	Recruit ratings: Rivals: ESPN: (80)				
Kyron Cumby; RB	Plano, TX	Plano Senior	5 ft 7 in (1.70 m)	170 lb (77 kg)	Jun 21, 2013
Kyron Cumby; RB	Recruit ratings: Rivals: ESPN: (79)				
Keith Randolph Jr. DE	Belleville, IL	Belleville West	6 ft 5 in (1.96 m)	270 lb (120 kg)	Dec 18, 2018
Keith Randolph Jr. DE	Recruit ratings: Rivals: ESPN: (76)				

=== Incoming transfers ===
Name	Number	Pos.	Previous School	Year
Chase Brown	#28	RB	Western Michigan	(RS)(I) Sophomore
Josh Imatorbhebhe	#9	WR	USC	(RS) Junior
Brandon Peters	#18	QB	Michigan	(RS) Junior
Luke Ford	#82	TE	Georgia	(RS)(I) Sophomore
Trevon Sidney	#5	WR	USC	(RS) Junior
Oluwole Betiku Jr.	#47	OLB	USC	Junior
Richie Petitbon	#74	OG	Alabama	(RS) Senior

Key:

(RS) = Redshirt

(I) = Ineligible/Sitting out
