= 2019 Michigan State Spartans football team =

American college football season

2019 Michigan State Spartans football

Pinstripe Bowl champion

Pinstripe Bowl, W 27–21 vs. Wake Forest
- Conference: Big Ten Conference
- East Division
- Record: 7–6 (4–5 Big Ten)
- Head coach: Mark Dantonio (13th season)
- Offensive coordinator: Brad Salem (1st season)
- Defensive coordinator: Mike Tressel (5th season)
- Home stadium: Spartan Stadium

Uniform
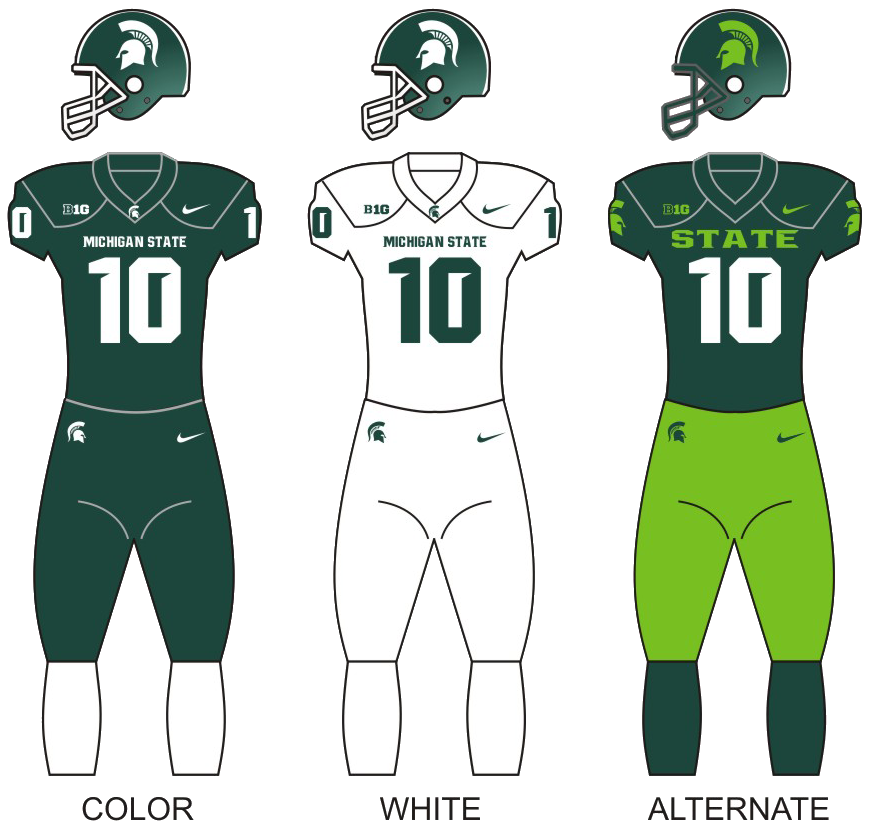

2019 Big Ten Conference football standings
	Conf.			Overall
Team	W		L	W		L
East Division
No. 3 Ohio State xy$^	9	–	0	13	–	1
No. 9 Penn State	7	–	2	11	–	2
No. 18 Michigan	6	–	3	9	–	4
Indiana	5	–	4	8	–	5
Michigan State	4	–	5	7	–	6
Maryland	1	–	8	3	–	9
Rutgers	0	–	9	2	–	10
West Division
No. 11 Wisconsin xy	7	–	2	10	–	4
No. 10 Minnesota x	7	–	2	11	–	2
No. 15 Iowa	6	–	3	10	–	3
Illinois	4	–	5	6	–	7
Purdue	3	–	6	4	–	8
Nebraska	3	–	6	5	–	7
Northwestern	1	–	8	3	–	9
Championship: Ohio State 34, Wisconsin 21
^ – College Football Playoff participant; $ – Conference champion; x – Division champion/co-champions; y – Championship game participant; Rankings from AP Poll

The 2019 Michigan State Spartans football team represented Michigan State University in the 2019 NCAA Division I FBS football season. The Spartans played their home games at Spartan Stadium in East Lansing, Michigan, and competed as member of the East Division of the Big Ten Conference. They were led by head coach Mark Dantonio in his 13th and final season at MSU.

MSU finished the season 7–6, 4–5 in Big Ten play to finish in fifth place in the East division. The Spartans received a bid to the 2019 Pinstripe Bowl where they defeated Wake Forest 27–21.

On February 4, 2020, the school announced that head coach Mark Dantonio had resigned. On February 12, 2020, Michigan State announced the hiring of Colorado head coach Mel Tucker as the school's 25th head football coach.

== Offseason ==
=== 2019 NFL draft ===
MSU kept its streak of 79 years of having at least one player drafted in the NFL Draft alive when Justin Layne was drafted in the third round of the 2019 NFL draft. Safety Khari Willis also was selected, in the fourth round.

Round	Pick	Team	Player	Position
3	83	Pittsburgh Steelers	Justin Layne	Cornerback
4	109	Indianapolis Colts	Khari Willis	Safety

=== Coaching changes ===
On January 10, 2019, the school announced that Brad Salem would be taking over as offensive coordinator for the Spartans, replacing co-offensive coordinators Dave Warner and Jim Bollman. Warner and Bollman would remain on the staff with different roles.

=== Recruiting ===
College recruiting (2019)
Name	Hometown	School	Height	Weight	Commit date
Tate Hallock; ATH	Grand Rapids, Michigan	Forest Hills Central High School	6 ft 3 in (1.91 m)	185 lb (84 kg)	
Tate Hallock; ATH	Recruit ratings: Scout: Rivals: 247Sports: ESPN:				
Adam Berghorst; DE	Zeeland, Michigan	Zeeland East High School	6 ft 7 in (2.01 m)	245 lb (111 kg)	
Adam Berghorst; DE	Recruit ratings: Scout: Rivals: 247Sports: ESPN:				
Jack Bouwmeester; P	Bendigo, Victoria	Catherine McAuley College	N/A	N/A	
Jack Bouwmeester; P	Recruit ratings: Scout: Rivals: 247Sports: ESPN:				
Payton Thorne; QB	Naperville, Illinois	Naperville Central High School	6 ft 2 in (1.88 m)	187 lb (85 kg)	
Payton Thorne; QB	Recruit ratings: Scout: Rivals: 247Sports: ESPN:				
Devontae Dobbs; OG	Belleville, Michigan	Belleville HS	6 ft 4 in (1.93 m)	304 lb (138 kg)	
Devontae Dobbs; OG	Recruit ratings: Scout: Rivals: 247Sports: ESPN:				
Luke Fulton; LB	Youngstown, Ohio	Cardinal Mooney	6 ft 3 in (1.91 m)	215 lb (98 kg)	
Luke Fulton; LB	Recruit ratings: Scout: Rivals: 247Sports: ESPN:				
Maverick Hansen; DT	Farmington, Michigan	Harrison	6 ft 5 in (1.96 m)	270 lb (120 kg)	
Maverick Hansen; DT	Recruit ratings: Scout: Rivals: 247Sports: ESPN:				
Julian Barnett; CB	Belleville, Michigan	Belleville HS	6 ft 2 in (1.88 m)	185 lb (84 kg)	
Julian Barnett; CB	Recruit ratings: Scout: Rivals: 247Sports: ESPN:				
Tre'Von Morgan; WR	Massillon, Ohio	Massillon Washington High School	6 ft 6 in (1.98 m)	215 lb (98 kg)	
Tre'Von Morgan; WR	Recruit ratings: Scout: Rivals: 247Sports: ESPN:				
Anthony Williams Jr; RB	Bolingbrook, Illinois	Bolingbrook High School	6 ft 0 in (1.83 m)	191 lb (87 kg)	
Anthony Williams Jr; RB	Recruit ratings: Scout: Rivals: 247Sports: ESPN:				
Marcel Lewis; LB	Clinton Township, Michigan	Chippewa Valley High School	6 ft 0 in (1.83 m)	218 lb (99 kg)	
Marcel Lewis; LB	Recruit ratings: Scout: Rivals: 247Sports: ESPN:				
Brandon Wright; RB	Euclid, Ohio	Euclid High School	6 ft 2 in (1.88 m)	220 lb (100 kg)	
Brandon Wright; RB	Recruit ratings: Scout: Rivals: 247Sports: ESPN:				
Tre Mosley; WR	West Bloomfield, Michigan	West Bloomfield High School	6 ft 2 in (1.88 m)	180 lb (82 kg)	
Tre Mosley; WR	Recruit ratings: Scout: Rivals: 247Sports: ESPN:				
Spencer Brown; OT	Walled Lake, Michigan	Walled Lake Western	6 ft 6 in (1.98 m)	295 lb (134 kg)	
Spencer Brown; OT	Recruit ratings: Scout: Rivals: 247Sports: ESPN:				
Micheal Fletcher; DE	Flint, Michigan	Carman-Ainsworth	6 ft 5 in (1.96 m)	240 lb (110 kg)	
Micheal Fletcher; DE	Recruit ratings: Scout: Rivals: 247Sports: ESPN:				
Nick Samac; OG	Mentor, Ohio	Mentor High School	6 ft 4 in (1.93 m)	260 lb (120 kg)	
Nick Samac; OG	Recruit ratings: Scout: Rivals: 247Sports: ESPN:				
Jase Bowen; WR	Toledo, Ohio	Central Catholic	6 ft 1 in (1.85 m)	178 lb (81 kg)	
Jase Bowen; WR	Recruit ratings: Scout: Rivals: 247Sports: ESPN:				
JD Duplain; OG	Strongsville, Ohio	Strongsville	6 ft 4 in (1.93 m)	295 lb (134 kg)	
JD Duplain; OG	Recruit ratings: Scout: Rivals: 247Sports: ESPN:				
Damon Kaylor; OT	Huntington, Indiana	Huntington North	6 ft 6 in (1.98 m)	315 lb (143 kg)	
Damon Kaylor; OT	Recruit ratings: Scout: Rivals: 247Sports: ESPN:				
Overall recruit ranking: Scout: 31 Rivals: 28 247Sports: 27
Note: In many cases, Scout, Rivals, 247Sports, On3, and ESPN may conflict in their listings of height and weight.; In these cases, the average was taken. ESPN grades are on a 100-point scale.; Sources: "Scout". Scout.; "Scout.com Team Recruiting Rankings". Scout.; "2019 Team Ranking". Rivals.com.

== Preseason ==
=== Preseason Big Ten poll ===
Although the Big Ten Conference has not held an official preseason poll since 2010, Cleveland.com has polled sports journalists representing all member schools as a de facto preseason media poll since 2011. For the 2019 poll, Michigan State was projected to finish in third in the East Division.

== Personnel ==
=== Roster ===
2019 Michigan State Spartans football team roster
Players
Coaches
Offense

Pos.	#	Name	Class
WR	2	Julian Barnett	Fr
WR	4	C. J. Hayes	So
WR	5	Jayden Reed	So
QB	6	Theo Day	Fr
WR	7	Cody White	Jr
WR	8	Jalen Nailor	So
QB	10	Payton Thorne	Fr
QB	12	Rocky Lombardi	So
WR	13	Laress Nelson	Jr
QB	14	Brian Lewerke	Sr
WR	16	Brandon Sowards	Sr
WR	17	Tre Mosley	Fr
WR	18	Tre’Von Morgan	Fr
WR	20	Emmanuel Flowers	So
WR	20	Davis Lewandowski	Sr
QB	23	Eli McLean	Fr
RB	24	Elijah Collins	Fr
WR	25	Darrell Stewart Jr.	Sr
RB	26	Brandon Wright	Fr
RB	34	Anthony Williams Jr.	Fr
RB	36	Noah Sargent	Jr
RB	39	Alante Thomas	Jr
TE	40	Jonathan Brys	So
FB	41	Reid Burton	Jr
FB	49	Max Rosenthal	So
OT	55	Jordan Reid	Jr
G	56	Matt Carrick	So
OL	58	Spencer Brown	Fr
OL	59	Nick Samac	Fr
OL	60	Bryce Wilker	Sr
OT	61	Cole Chewins	Sr
OT	62	Luke Campbell	Jr
OL	64	Matt Allen	Jr
OL	66	Blake Bueter	So
OL	67	J.D. Duplain	Fr
OT	68	Dan Vanopstall	Fr
OL	69	Tommy Liesveld	Jr
OL	70	Tyler Higby	Sr
OL	71	James Ohonba	Fr
OL	72	Damon Kaylor	Fr
OL	73	Jacob Isaia	Fr
OL	74	Jack Henrichs	So
G	75	Kevin Jarvis	Jr
OT	76	A. J. Arcuri	Jr
OL	77	Dimitri Douglas	Fr
OT	79	Mustafa Khaleefah	So
WR	80	Jalen Allen	Fr
WR	82	Javez Alexander	Fr
WR	85	Cade McDonald	Fr
TE	86	Parks Gissinger	Fr
WR	87	Jahz Watts	So
TE	88	Trenton Gillison	Fr
TE	89	Matt Dotson	Jr

Defense

Pos.	#	Name	Class
S	3	Xavier Henderson	So
DE	5	Michael Fletcher	Fr
S	6	David Dowell	Sr
S	7	Michael Dowell	Fr
CB	8	Chris Jackson	Fr
S	9	Dominique Long	Jr
LB	13	Marcel Lewis	Fr
CB	14	Davion Williams	Fr
LB	17	Tyriq Thompson	Sr
CB	18	Kalon Gervin	Fr
CB	19	Josh Butler	Sr
LB	21	Chase Kline	Fr
CB	22	Josiah Scott	Jr
DB	23	Andre Welch	Jr
CB	24	Tre Person	Jr
S	28	Tate Hallock	Fr
CB	29	Shakur Brown	So
LB	30	Tanner Hallock	So
LB	31	Edward Warinner	Fr
DB	32	Corey Pryor	Jr
LB	33	Jeslord Boateng	Fr
LB	34	Antjuan Simmons	Jr
LB	35	Joe Bachie	Sr
LB	37	Dante Razzano	Jr
LB	38	Luke Fulton	Fr
LB	41	Charles Willekes	Fr
DE	42	Brent Mossburg	So
S	43	Jack Mandryk	So
DE	44	Adam Berghorst	Fr
LB	45	Noah Harvey	So
DE	48	Kenny Willekes	Sr
S	49	David Kruse	Fr
LB	53	Peter Fisk	Jr
DE	55	Zach Slade	Fr
DL	57	Evan Brunning	Fr
LB	58	Terry O'Connor	Fr
DT	64	Jacob Slade	Fr
DT	72	Mike Panasiuk	Sr
DE	80	Matt Seybert	Sr
DL	86	Drew Beesley	Jr
DL	89	Jalen Hunt	Fr
DE	91	Jack Camper	So
DE	92	DeAri Todd	So
DT	93	Naquan Jones	Jr
DT	94	Dashaun Mallory	Fr
DE	96	Jacub Panasiuk	Jr
DT	99	Raequan Williams	Sr

Special teams

Pos.	#	Name	Class
K	4	Matt Coghlin	Jr
P	25	Jake Hartbarger	Sr
LS	47	Ryan Armour	Sr
LS	51	Jude Pedrozo	Fr
K, P	92	Evan Morris	Fr
P	94	Jack Bouwmeester	Fr
K	97	Tyler Hunt	So
K	98	Cole Hahn	So
P	99	Bryce Baringer	So

Head coach

- Mark Dantonio

Coordinators/assistant coaches

- Mike Tressel (assistant head coach / defensive coordinator / linebackers)
- Brad Salem (offensive coordinator / running backs)
- Jim Bollman (offensive line)
- Chuck Bullough (defensive ends)
- Ron Burton (defensive tackles)
- Paul Haynes (Secondary)
- Terrence Samuel (Asst. Defensive Backs)
- Mark Staten (Tight Ends / special teams coordinator)
- Don Treadwell (wide receivers)
- Dave Warner (quarterbacks)

Legend

- (C) Team captain
- (S) Suspended
- (I) Ineligible
- Injured
- Redshirt

Roster
Last update: August 16, 2019

=== Coaching staff ===
Name	Position	Joined staff
Mark Dantonio	Head coach	2007
Mike Tressel	Assistant head coach/Defensive coordinator	2007
Brad Salem	Offensive coordinator/Running Backs	2010
Jim Bollman	Offensive line	2013
Chuck Bullough	Defensive ends	2018
Ron Burton	Defensive tackles	2013
Paul Haynes	Secondary	2018
Terrence Samuel	Asst. Defensive Backs	2011
Mark Staten	Tight Ends/special teams	2007
Don Treadwell	Wide receivers	2018
Dave Warner	Quarterbacks	2007

== Schedule ==
Michigan State's 2019 schedule began with three non-conference home games, first against Tulsa of the American Athletic Conference, then Western Michigan of the Mid-American Conference, and finally Arizona State of the Pac-12 Conference.

In Big Ten Conference play, the Spartans played all members of the East Division and drew Northwestern, Wisconsin, and Illinois from the West Division.

Date	Time	Opponent	Rank	Site	TV	Result	Attendance
August 30	7:00 p.m.	Tulsa*	No. 18	Spartan Stadium; East Lansing, MI	FS1	W 28–7	72,005
September 7	7:30 p.m.	Western Michigan*	No. 19	Spartan Stadium; East Lansing, MI	BTN	W 51–17	73,113
September 14	4:00 p.m.	Arizona State*	No. 18	Spartan Stadium; East Lansing, MI	FOX	L 7–10	73,531
September 21	12:00 p.m.	at Northwestern		Ryan Field; Evanston, IL	ABC	W 31–10	40,114
September 28	3:30 p.m.	Indiana^{†}	No. 25	Spartan Stadium; East Lansing, MI (Old Brass Spittoon)	BTN	W 40–31	71,048
October 5	7:30 p.m.	at No. 4 Ohio State	No. 25	Ohio Stadium; Columbus, OH	ABC	L 10–34	104,797
October 12	3:30 p.m.	at No. 8 Wisconsin		Camp Randall Stadium; Madison, WI	BTN	L 0–38	80,470
October 26	3:30 p.m.	No. 6 Penn State		Spartan Stadium; East Lansing, MI (Land Grant Trophy)	ABC	L 7–28	70,298
November 9	3:30 p.m.	Illinois		Spartan Stadium; East Lansing, MI	FS1	L 34–37	63,370
November 16	12:00 p.m.	at No. 15 Michigan		Michigan Stadium; Ann Arbor, MI (Paul Bunyan Trophy)	FOX	L 10–44	111,496
November 23	12:00 p.m.	at Rutgers		SHI Stadium; Piscataway, NJ	FS1	W 27–0	24,641
November 30	3:30 p.m.	Maryland		Spartan Stadium; East Lansing, MI	FS1	W 19–16	51,336
December 27	3:20 p.m.	vs. Wake Forest*		Yankee Stadium; The Bronx, New York (Pinstripe Bowl)	ESPN	W 27–21	36,895
*Non-conference game; ^{†}Homecoming; Rankings from AP Poll and CFP Rankings (after November 5) released prior to game; All times are in Eastern time

== Rankings ==
Ranking movements Legend: ██ Increase in ranking ██ Decrease in ranking — = Not ranked RV = Received votes т = Tied with team above or below
	Week																
Poll	Pre	1	2	3	4	5	6	7	8	9	10	11	12	13	14	15	Final
AP	18	19	18	RV	25	25-T	RV	—	—	—	—	—	—	—	—	—	
Coaches	20	20	19	RV	RV	23-T	RV	—	—	—	—	—	—	—	—	—	
CFP	Not released										—	—	—	—	—	—	Not released

== Game summaries ==
=== Tulsa ===
Week One: Tulsa at Michigan State – Game summary

Quarter	1	2	3	4	Total
Tulsa	0	7	0	0	7
No. 18 Michigan State	7	18	3	0	28

at Spartan Stadium, East Lansing, MI

- Date: August 30, 2019
- Game time: 7:00 p.m.
- Game weather: 72 °F (22 °C), Wind: 8 mph (13 km/h) NW, Partly Cloudy
- Game attendance: 72,005
- Referee: John O'Neill
- TV announcers (FS1): Tim Brando (play-by-play), Spencer Tillman (analyst) and Coley Harvey (sideline)

Game information

First Quarter

- (11:41) MSU TD: Heyward, Connor 15 yd pass from Lewerke, Brian, Coghlin, Matt kick
  Michigan State 7–0; 9 plays, 73 yards, 3:19

Second Quarter

- (14:03) MSU FG: Coghlin 38 yd field goal
  Michigan State 10–0; 4 plays, 4 yards, 0:48
- (09:59) MSU FG: Coghlin 47 yd field goal
  Michigan State 13–0; 7 plays, 7 yards, 2:07
- (09:09) MSU Safety
  Michigan State 15–0
- (04:49) MSU TD: Willekes, Kenny 0 yd fumble recover, Coghlin kick
  Michigan State 22–0
- (02:32) MSU FG: Coghlin 44 yd field goal
  Michigan State 25–0; 4 plays, 4 yards, 1:30
- (00:36) Tulsa TD: Crawford, Jr, S. 28 yd pass from Smith, Z., Rainey J. kick
  Michigan State 25–7; 7 plays, 85 yards, 1:45

Third Quarter

- (02:20) MSU FG: Coghlin 40 yd field goal
  Michigan State 28–7; 17 plays, 72 yards, 7:23

Passing

- Tulsa – Zach Smith: 16/27, 153 yards, 1 TD, 1 INT
- MSU – Brian Lewerke: 21/37, 192 yards, 1 TD

Rushing

- Tulsa – Shamari Brooks: 6 carries, 0 yards
- MSU – Connor Heyward: 15 carries, 43 yards

Receiving

- Tulsa – Keylon Stokes: 6 receptions, 54 yards
- MSU – Darrell Stewart Jr.: 6 receptions, 56 yards

The Spartans opened the 2019 season under the lights for the second consecutive year, welcoming American Athletic Conference foe Tulsa to Spartan Stadium.

MSU received the ball first and moved right down the field, moving to the Tulsa 15 yard line before Brian Lewerke hit Connor Heyward on a swing pass for a touchdown and an early 7–0 lead. The MSU defense took over from there forcing Tulsa to punt on consecutive possessions while MSU turned the ball over on downs and was forced to punt on their next two possessions. At the start of the second half, the Spartans blocked a Tulsa punt ad took over at the Tulsa 24. However, the MSU offense could not manage more than four yards and settled for a Matt Coghlin 28 yard field goal and a 10–0 lead. DE Kenny Willekes recovered a fumble on the ensuing Tulsa possession and MSU settled for another Cochlin field goal. On the next Tulsa possession, a bad shotgun snap ended up going out the back of the Tulsa endzone for safety to give the Spartans a 15–0 lead. The MSU offense moved the ball steadily down the field again, but with fourth and one at the Tulsa nine-yard line, Rocky Lombardi was stopped short and the Spartans again turned the ball over on downs. However, MSU's defense again picked up the slack for the offense as Raequan Williams combined with Willekes for a sack, forcing a fumble that Willekes recovered in the endzone. The score pushed MSU's lead to 22–0. MSU's defense intercepted the next Tulsa pass, setting up MSU at Tulsa's 30-yard line. However, the Spartans again settled for a Coghlin field goal and a 25–0 lead. With just over two minutes remaining in the half, Tulsa moved 85 yards down the field and capped the drive with a 28-yard touchdown pass to narrow the lead to 25–7 at the half.

In the second half, the MSU defense continued its dominance forcing punts on all three of the Tulsa possessions in the third quarter. MSU's offense failed to manage much more, settling for another Coghlin field goal to push the lead to 28–7. Neither offense managed anything else for the remainder of the game as the Spartans won 28–7. The Spartans held Tulsa to -73 yards rushing, limiting the Hurricane to 80 total offensive yards. MSU's offense managed 195 yards through the air and 108 yards rushing in the easy win, but failed to score more than one touchdown.

=== Western Michigan ===
Week Two: Western Michigan at Michigan State – Game summary

Quarter	1	2	3	4	Total
Western Michigan	0	7	0	10	17
No. 19 Michigan State	21	10	6	14	51

at Spartan Stadium, East Lansing, MI

- Date: September 7, 2019
- Game time: 7:40 pm
- Game weather: 68 °F (20 °C), Wind: 7 mph (11 km/h) WNW, Partly Sunny
- Game attendance: 73,113
- Referee: Jerry McGinn
- TV announcers (BTN): Brandon Gaudin (play-by-play), James Laurinaitis (analyst), and Elise Menaker (sideline)

Game information

First Quarter

- (13:26) MSU TD: Dotson, Matt 2 yd pass from Lewerke, Brian, Coghlin, Matt kick
  Michigan State 7–0; 4 plays, 79 yards, 1:34
- (08:14) MSU TD: Jefferson, La'Darius 2 yd run, Coghlin kick
  Michigan State 14–0; 9 plays 69 yards, 2:43
- (01:59) MSU TD: Stewart, Darryl 42 yd pass from Lewerke, Coghlin kick
  Michigan State 21–0; 5 plays, 80 yards, 2:17

Second Quarter

- (11:34) WMU TD: Ricci, G 14 yd pass from Wassink, J, Kapps, T kick
  Michigan State 21–7; 10 plays, 66 yards, 5:18
- (04:32) MSU TD: White, Cody 2 yd pass from Lewerke, Coghlin kick
  Michigan State 28–7; 9 plays, 80 yards, 3:40
- (00:00) MSU FG: Coghlin 38 yd field goal
  Michigan State 31–7; 8 plays, 60 yards, 0:49

Third Quarter

- (11:30) MSU FG: Coghlin 23 yd field goal
  Michigan State 34–7; 5 plays, 63 yards, 1:55
- (05:36) MSU FG: Coghlin 20 yd field goal
  Michigan State 37–7; 9 plays, 61 yards, 4:04

Fourth Quarter

- (13:37) MSU TD: Jefferson 1 yd run, Coghlin kick
  Michigan State 44–7; 8 plays 57 yards, 4:25
- (08:41) WMU FG: Kapps 31 yd field goal
  Michigan State 44–10; 11 plays, 61 yards, 4:56
- (04:03) MSU TD: Thomas, Alante 1 yd run, Coghlin kick
  Michigan State 51–10; 4 plays, 24 yards, 2:11
- (00:24) WMU TD: Selig, R 15 yd pass from Alstott, G, Kapps kick
  Michigan State 51–17' 9 plays 72 yards, 3:55

Passing

- WMU – Jon Wassink: 23/57, 252 yards, 1 TD, 2 INT
- MSU – Brian Lewerke: 23/32, 314 yards, 3 TD, 1 INT

Rushing

- WMU – LeVante Bellamy: 15 carries, 48 yards
- MSU – Elijah Collins: 17 carries, 192 yards

Receiving

- WMU – Giovanni Ricci: 10 receptions, 53 yards
- MSU – Darrell Stewart Jr.: 10 receptions, 185 yards

=== Arizona State ===
Week Three: Arizona State at Michigan State – Game summary

Quarter	1	2	3	4	Total
Arizona State	0	3	0	7	10
No. 18 Michigan State	0	0	0	7	7

at Spartan Stadium, East Lansing, MI

- Date: September 14, 2019
- Game time: 3:00 p.m.
- Game weather: Mostly sunny, 75 °F (24 °C)
- Game attendance: 73,531
- Referee: Mark Duddy
- TV announcers (FOX): Tim Brando (play-by-play), Spencer Tillman (analyst), Coley Harvey (sideline)

Game information

First quarter

- No scoring plays

Second quarter

- (3:40) ASU – Cristian Zendejas 41-yard field goal (Drive: 10 plays, 48 yards, 5:38; Arizona State 3–0)

Third quarter

- No scoring plays

Fourth quarter

- (8:37) MSU – Elijah Collins 9-yard run, Kyle Ferrie kick (Drive: 10 plays, 70 yards, 5:31; Michigan State 7–3)
- (0:50) ASU – Eno Benjamin 1-yard run, Cristian Zendejas kick (Drive: 11 plays, 75 yards, 2:44; Arizona State 10–7)

Passing

- ASU – Jayden Daniels: 15/26, 140 yards
- MSU – Brian Lewerke: 24/38, 291 yards

Rushing

- ASU – Eno Benjamin: 11 carries, 38 yards, 1 TD
- MSU – Elijah Collins: 19 carries, 72 yards, 1 TD

Receiving

- ASU – Brandon Aiyuk: 5 receptions, 64 yards
- MSU – Darrell Stewart Jr.: 9 receptions, 121 yards

=== Northwestern ===
Week Four: Michigan State at Northwestern – Game summary

Quarter	1	2	3	4	Total
Michigan State	7	7	10	7	31
Northwestern	0	3	0	7	10

at Ryan Field, Evanston, IL

- Date: September 21, 2019
- Game time: 12:06 pm
- Game weather: 76 °F (24 °C), 14 mph (23 km/h) S-SW, Rain Showers
- Game attendance: 40,114
- Referee: Ron Snodgrass
- TV announcers (ABC): Dave Pasch (play-by-play), Greg McElroy (analyst), Tom Luginbill (sideline)

Game information

First Quarter

- (11:42) MSU TD: Elijah Collins 5 yd run, Matt Coghlin kick
  Michigan State 7–0; 9 plays, 75 yards, 3:18

Second Quarter

- (14:13) NU FG: Charlie Kuhbander 39 yd field goal
  Michigan State 7–3; 12 plays 43 yards, 3:43
- (00:24) MSU TD: Cody White 11 yd pass from Brian Lewerke, Coghlin kick
  Michigan State 14–3; 11 plays, 62 yards, 1:15

Third Quarter

- (04:41) MSU TD: Matt Seybert 8 yd pass from Lewerke, Coghlin kick
  Michigan State 21–3; 10 plays, 53 yards, 3:48
- (00:03) MSU FG: Coghlin 26 yd field goal
  Michigan State 24–3; 8 plays, 46 yards, 3:12

Fourth Quarter

- (12:34) MSU TD: Seybert 7 yd pass from Lewerke, Coghlin kick
  Michigan State 31–3; 3 plays, 22 yards, 1:24
- (02:41) NU TD: Drake Anderson 2 yd run, Kuhbander kick
  Michigan State 31–10;9 plays, 63 yards, 2:58

Passing

- NU – Hunter Johnson: 15/26, 88 yards, INT
- MSU – Brian Lewerke: 18/31, 228 yards, 3 TD

Rushing

- NU – Drake Anderson: 17 carries, 93 yards, TD
- MSU – Elijah Collins: 17 carries, 76 yards, TD

Receiving

- NU – Ben Skowronek: 3 receptions, 31 yards
- MSU – Darrell Stewart Jr.: 5 receptions, 77 yards

Following a stunning loss at home to Arizona State the week prior, the Spartans would open conference play on the road in an inter-divisional match up against the Northwestern Wildcats.

The Spartans would receive the opening kickoff and march directly down the field with a 9 play, 75-yard drive capped off by an Elijah Collins touchdown run of 5-yards, giving MSU an early 7–0 lead. The defense would force a punt on the ensuing Northwestern offensive possession; however, Cody White would fumble on the punt return, giving Northwestern favorable field position at the MSU 27-yard line. The Wildcats drove to the MSU 1-yard line, but were unable to score as the Spartan defense stood tall with a goal line stand, forcing a turnover on downs. Northwestern would add a field goal on their next offensive possession, bringing the score to 7–3, Michigan State. Shortly before the half, Northwestern would drive to midfield before a Hunter Johnson pass was intercepted by Josiah Scott at the MSU 38-yard line, giving the Spartan offense favorable field position with a little under 2 minutes remaining in the half. The offense would take advantage of the turnover, going on an 11 play, 62-yard drive capped off by an 11-yard touchdown pass from Brian Lewerke to Cody White. Michigan State took a 14–3 lead heading into halftime.

Michigan State would expand its lead late in the 3rd quarter after Brian Lewerke connected with Matt Seybert on an 8-yard touchdown pass, giving them a 21–3 lead. The Spartans would score again on their next possession on a Matt Coghlin 26-yard field goal (prior to this conversion, Coghlin had missed 4 straight field goal attempts). After 3 quarters of action, MSU led 24–3. Following a Drew Beasley interception, State would add to their lead early in the 4th quarter after Brian Lewerke would once again connect with Matt Seybert, this time on a 7-yard touchdown pass, giving them a 31–3 lead. Northwestern would finally score a touchdown on a Drake Anderson 2-yard run with under 3 minutes remaining, putting the final score at 31–10. With the win, the Spartans snapped a 3-game losing streak against Northwestern and Mark Dantonio earned his 110th victory as head coach at MSU, surpassing Duffy Daugherty to become the all time winningest head coach in Michigan State football history.

=== Indiana ===
Week Five: Indiana at Michigan State – Game summary

Quarter	1	2	3	4	Total
Indiana	7	7	3	14	31
No. 25 Michigan State	7	14	0	19	40

at Spartan Stadium, East Lansing, MI

- Date: September 28, 2019
- Game time: 3:40 pm
- Game weather: 64 °F (18 °C), Wind: 6 mph (9.7 km/h) N-NE, Overcast
- Game attendance: 71,048
- Referee: Mike Cannon
- TV announcers (BTN): Brandon Gaudin (analyst), James Laurinaitis (play by play), Elise Menaker (sideline)

Game information

First Quarter

- (08:04) MSU TD: Elijah Collins 4 yd run, Matt Coghlin kick
  Michigan State 7–0; 6 plays, 71 yards, 2:11
- (01:35) IU TD: Whop Philyor 28 yd pass from Michael Penix Jr., Logan Justus kick
  Tied 7–7; 6 plays, 68 yards, 2:04

Second Quarter

- (12:55) MSU TD: Darrell Stewart Jr. 5 yd pass from Lewerke, Coghlin kick
  Michigan State 14–7; 10 plays, 75 yards, 3:40
- (04:07) IU TD: Penix Jr. 2 yd run, Justus kick
  Tied 14–14; 10 plays, 80 yards, 5:38
- (00:33) MSU TD: Stewart Jr. 26 yd pass from Lewerke, Coghlin kick
  Michigan State 21–14; 5 plays, 56 yards, 0:46

Third Quarter

- (08:23) IU FG: Justus 26 yd field goal
  Michigan State 21–17; 12 plays, 81 yards, 6:32

Fourth Quarter

- (14:52) IU TD: Donovan Hale 12 yd pass from Penix Jr., Justus kick
  Indiana 24–21; 13 plays, 80 yards, 6:36
- (12:12) MSU TD: Matt Seybert 10 yd pass from Lewerke, Coghlin kick
  Michigan State 28–24; 2 plays, 26 yards, 0:30
- (03:33) MSU FG: Coghlin 44 yd field goal
  Michigan State 31–24; 13 plays, 54 yards, 6:25
- (02:00) IU TD: Philyor 11 yd pass from Penix Jr., Justus kick
  Tied 31–31; 6 plays, 78 yards, 1:27
- (00:05) MSU FG: Coghlin 21 yd field goal
  Michigan State 34–31; 5 plays, 72 yards, 1:55
- (00:00) MSU TD: Michael Dowell 0 yd fumble return
  Michigan State 40–31

Passing

- NU – Michael Penix Jr.: 33/42, 286 yards, 3 TD
- MSU – Brian Lewerke: 18/36, 300 yards, 3 TD

Rushing

- NU – Stevie Scott III: 18 carries, 66 yards
- MSU – Brian Lewerke: 12 carries, 78 yards

Receiving

- NU – Whop Philyor: 14 receptions, 142 yards, 2 TD
- MSU – Darrell Stewart Jr.: 5 receptions, 117 yards, 2 TD

After a dominating road victory over Northwestern, the Spartans returned to East Lansing for Homecoming to host rival Indiana.

After opting to receive the opening kickoff, the Spartan offense drove all the way to the Indiana 25-yard line before Matt Coghlin missed a 43-yard field goal attempt. Following a defensive stop, MSU would get the ball back and score a touchdown on an Elijah Collins 5-yard run, giving them a 7–0 lead. Several possessions later, Indiana would tie the game on a 28-yard touchdown pass to Whop Philyor from Michael Penix Jr. The Spartans would retake the lead on their next possession early in the 2nd quarter on a 5-yard touchdown pass from Brian Lewerke to Darrell Stewart Jr., giving them a 14–7 lead. Indiana would tie the game several possessions later with a lengthy 10 play, 80-yard drive capped off by a 2-yard rush touchdown by Penix Jr. After trading possessions, the Michigan State offense would receive the ball at their own 44-yard line with just under a minute left to play in the half. Brian Lewerke would guide the offense down the field, finding Darrell Stewart on a 26-yard passing touchdown with just under 30 seconds remaining in the half. The Spartans would take a 21–14 lead heading into halftime.

The Hoosiers would receive the ball to start the 2nd half and would put together another lengthy drive of 12 plays, 81-yards, and taking 6:32 off the clock, settling for a Logan Justus 26-yard field goal to put the score at 21–17, MSU. The Spartan offense would move the ball to the Indiana 46-yard line before being forced to punt, giving the ball right back to the Indiana offense who would score after a 13 play, 80-yard drive capped off by a Donovan Hale 12-yard touchdown reception from Penix Jr., giving them their first and only lead of the game at 24–21. The Spartan offense would receive great field position after a Brandon Sowards punt return of 22-yards (which was aided by a procedure penalty against Indiana that tacked on an additional 5-yards to the return) set them up at the IU 26-yard line. Several plays later, Brian Lewerke would connect with Matt Seybert on a 10-yard touchdown pass, with Michigan State retaking the lead 28–21. After a defensive stop, the Spartans would add onto their lead with a Matt Coghlin 44-yard field goal, putting the score at 31–24, MSU. The Hoosiers would tie the game at 31 apiece on their next possession on a Whop Philyor 11-yard touchdown pass from Michael Penix Jr. With 2 minutes remaining in the game, the Michigan State offense would take possession of the ball. On the first play of the drive, Brian Lewerke would connect with Darrell Stewart for a 44-yard completion, immediately putting MSU in field goal range. They would drive all the way to the Indiana 3-yard line, taking the clock all the way down to 8 seconds before Matt Coghlin would make the go ahead 21-yard field goal, giving MSU a 34–31 lead; Indiana would receive the ball with 5 seconds remaining. With time running out, Michael Penix Jr. would fumble the ball after a lateral, and Michael Dowell would recover the ball in the end zone to end the game on a defensive touchdown, giving MSU a 40–31 victory.

=== Ohio State ===
Week Six: Michigan State at Ohio State– Game summary

Quarter	1	2	3	4	Total
No. 25 Michigan State	0	10	0	0	10
No. 4 Ohio State	3	24	0	7	34

at Ohio Stadium, Columbus, OH

- Date: October 5, 2019
- Game time: 7:44 p.m.
- Game weather: Sunny
- Game attendance: 104,797
- Referee: Larry Smith
- TV announcers (ABC): Chris Fowler (play-by-play), Kirk Herbstreit (analyst), Maria Taylor (sideline)

=== Wisconsin ===
Week Seven: Michigan State at Wisconsin– Game summary

Quarter	1	2	3	4	Total
Michigan State	0	0	0	0	0
No. 8 Wisconsin	7	10	0	21	38

at Camp Randall Stadium, Madison, WI

- Date: October 12, 2019
- Game time: 3:45 p.m.
- Game weather: Partly Cloudy
- Game attendance: 80,470
- Referee: Daniel Capron
- TV announcers (BTN): Kevin Kugler (play-by-play), Matt Millen (analyst), Rick Pizzo (sideline)

=== Penn State ===
Week Eight: Penn State at Michigan State – Game summary

Quarter	1	2	3	4	Total
No. 6 Penn State	7	14	7	0	28
Michigan State	0	0	7	0	7

at Spartan Stadium, East Lansing, MI

- Date: October 26, 2019
- Game time: 3:30 p.m.
- Game weather: Steady rain; 47 °F (8 °C)
- Game attendance: 70,298
- Referee: Jerry McGinn
- TV announcers (ABC): Sean McDonough (play-by-play), Todd Blackledge (analyst), Holly Rowe (sideline)
- Sources: ESPN Box Score

Game information

First quarter

- PSU – Pat Freiermuth, 16-yard TD pass from Sean Clifford, Jake Pinegar kick good, 6:54 (PSU 7–0)

Second quarter

- PSU – Freiermuth, 19-yard TD pass from Clifford, Pinegar kick missed, 14:30 (PSU 13–0)
- PSU – K. J. Hamler, 27-yard TD pass from Clifford, Clifford run for 2-point conversion, 1:20 (PSU 21–0)

Third quarter

- PSU – Freiermuth, 6-yard TD pass from Clifford, Pinegar kick good, 10:10 (PSU 28–0)
- MSU – Anthony Williams Jr., 4-yard TD run, Matt Coghlin kick good, 7:34 (PSU 28–7)

Fourth quarter

No scoring

Top passers

- PSU – Sean Clifford – 18/32, 189 yards, 4 TD, INT
- MSU – Brian Lewerke – 16/34, 165 yards, INT

Top rushers

- PSU – Journey Brown – 12 carries, 45 yards
- MSU – Elijah Collins – 17 carries, 53 yards

Top receivers

- PSU – Pat Freiermuth – 5 receptions, 60 yards, 3 TD
- MSU – Cody White – 3 receptions, 66 yards

Top defenders

- PSU – Micah Parsons – 12 tackles
- MSU – Tyriq Thompson – 11 tackles, 1 tackle-for-loss (TFL)

=== Illinois ===
Week Nine: Illinois at Michigan State – Game summary

Quarter	1	2	3	4	Total
Illinois	3	7	0	27	37
Michigan State	14	14	3	3	34

at Spartan Stadium, East Lansing, MI

- Date: November 9, 2019
- Game time: 3:30 p.m.
- Game attendance: 63,370
- TV announcers (FS1): Kevin Kugler, Matt Millen, Lisa Byington

=== Michigan ===
Week Ten: Michigan State at Michigan– Game summary

Quarter	1	2	3	4	Total
Michigan State	7	0	3	0	10
No. 15 Michigan	0	17	10	17	44

at Michigan Stadium, Ann Arbor, MI

- Date: November 16, 2019
- Game time: 12:05 p.m.
- Game weather: Partly cloudy
- Game attendance: 111,496
- Referee: Daniel Capron
- TV announcers (FOX): Gus Johnson, Joel Klatt, Jenny Taft

Game information

First Quarter

- (1:48) MSU TD: Max Rosenthal 1-yard pass from Brian Lewerke, Matt Coghlin kick
  Michigan State 7–0; 9 plays, 60 yards, 3:47

Second Quarter

- (14:29) MICH TD: Hassan Haskins 1-yard run, Quinn Nordin kick
  Tied 7–7; 7 plays, 68 yards, 2:19
- (4:18) MICH TD: Nick Eubanks 5 yd pass from Shea Patterson, Quinn Nordin kick
  Michigan 14–7; 12 plays, 98 yards, 5:39
- (0:15) MICH FG: Quinn Nordin 28-yard field goal
  Michigan 17–7; 7 plays, 50 yards, 3:06

Third Quarter

- (12:40) MICH TD: Donovan Peoples-Jones 18-yard pass from Shea Patterson, Quinn nordin kick
  Michigan 24–7; 4 plays, 57 yards, 1:19
- (6:43) MSU FG: Matt Coghlin 35-yard field goal
  Michigan 24–10; 13 plays, 59 yards, 5:57
- (2:13) MICH FG: Quinn Nordin 49-yard field goal
  Michigan 27–10; 11 plays, 34 yards, 4:30

Fourth Quarter

- (14:46) MICH TD: Nico Collins 22-yard pass from Shea Patterson, Quinn Nordin kick
  Michigan 34–10; 1 play, 22 yards, 0:07
- (10:12) MICH FG: Quinn Nordin 33-yard field goal
  Michigan State 37–10; 8 plays, 29 yards, 4:02
- (2:33) MICH TD: C. Johnson 39-yard pass from Shea Patterson, Quinn Nordin kick
  Michigan 44–10; 6 plays, 74 yards, 3:32

Passing

- MSU – Brian Lewerke: 17/30, 166 yards, TD, 2 INT
- MICH – Shea Patterson: 24/33, 384 yards, 4 TD

Rushing

- MSU – Elijah Collins: 12 carries, 27 yards
- MICH – Giles Jackson: 2 carries, 32 yards

Receiving

- MSU – Cody White: 6 receptions, 78 yards
- MICH – Ronnie Bell: 9 receptions, 150 yards

After its game against Maryland and having a second bye week, Michigan hosted its in-state rival, the Michigan State Spartans in the battle for the Paul Bunyan Trophy. The previous season, Michigan defeated Michigan State 21–7.[62][63]

Michigan defeated Michigan State 44–10.[64] Michigan State opened the scoring in the first quarter with a one-yard touchdown pass from Brian Lewerke to Max Rosenthal. Michigan punted on its first two possessions, but scored on each of its next eight. Michigan's first points came on the second play of the second quarter on a one-yard touchdown run from Hassan Haskins. Its next drive began on its two-yard line, and ended 12 plays and 98 yards later with a five-yard touchdown pass from Shea Patterson to Nick Eubanks. Michigan kicker Quinn Nordin converted a 28-yard field goal with 15 seconds left in the half, which made the score 17–7 in favor of Michigan at half-time. Michigan added 10 points in the third quarter on an 18-yard touchdown pass from Patterson to Donovan Peoples-Jones and a 49-yard field goal by Nordin. Michigan State scored on a 35-yard field goal by Matt Coghlin. Michigan added 17 points in the fourth quarter on a 22-yard touchdown pass from Patterson to Nico Collins, a 33-yard field goal by Nordin and a 39-yard touchdown pass from Patterson to Cornelius Johnson.[65]

Michigan's defense held Michigan State to 54 rushing yards and only 17 receptions, the Spartans' second lowest reception total of the season. Patterson's 384 yards and four touchdown passes represented career highs for him since transferring to Michigan.[63] Tom Fornelli of CBS Sports called the game "a thoroughly dominating performance by the Wolverines", noting that Michigan's 44 points "are the most it has scored in a game against Michigan State since a 45–37 victory in 2004".[66] According to MLive, the game was the most lopsided loss Mark Dantonio experienced in his 13 rivalry games, and it was also the largest margin of defeat for Michigan State against Michigan since a 49–3 loss in 2002.[67]

=== Rutgers ===
Week Eleven: Michigan State at Rutgers– Game summary

Quarter	1	2	3	4	Total
Michigan State	10	7	3	7	27
Rutgers	0	0	0	0	0

at SHI Stadium, Piscataway, NJ

- Date: November 23, 2019
- Game time: 12:00 p.m.
- Game attendance: 24,641
- TV: FS1

=== Maryland ===
Week Twelve: Maryland at Michigan State – Game summary

Quarter	1	2	3	4	Total
Maryland	7	0	9	0	16
Michigan State	3	10	0	6	19

at Spartan Stadium, East Lansing, MI

- Date: November 30, 2019
- Game time: 3:30 p.m.
- Game attendance: 51,366
- TV: FS1

=== Vs. Wake Forest (Pinstripe Bowl) ===
Pinstripe Bowl: Michigan State vs. Wake Forest – Game summary

Quarter	1	2	3	4	Total
Michigan State	10	10	7	0	27
Wake Forest	7	14	0	0	21

at Yankee Stadium, The Bronx, New York

- Date: December 27, 2019
- Game time: 3:20 p.m.
- Game weather: Cloudy • Temperature: 53 °F (12 °C) • Wind: SW 9 mph
- Game attendance: 36,895
- Referee: Cooper Castleberry
- TV announcers (ESPN): Adam Amin (play-by-play), Matt Hasselbeck (analyst), Paul Carcaterra (sideline)
- Sources: ESPN game summary

Game information

First Quarter

- (12:44) WAKE – Jamie Newman 29 yard pass to Kendall Hinton, Nick Sciba kick (Drive: 7 plays, 65 yards, 2:16; Wake Forest 7–0)
- (2:44) MSU – Matt Coghlin 23 yard field goal (Drive: 16 plays, 75 yards, 6:21; Wake Forest 7–3)
- (2:01) MSU – Mike Panasiuk 15 yard interception return, Matt Coghlin kick (Michigan State 10–7)

Second Quarter

- (9:14) WAKE – Jamie Newman 16 yard pass to Donavon Greene, Nick Sciba kick (Drive: 6 plays, 36 yards, 2:08; Wake Forest 14–10)
- (8:13) MSU – Brian Lewerke 8 yard rush, Matt Coghlin kick (Drive: 3 plays, 70 yards, 0:51; Michigan State 17–14)
- (6:19) WAKE – Jamie Newman 45 yard pass to Jack Freudenthal, Nick Sciba kick (Drive: 6 plays, 80 yards, 1:47; Wake Forest 21–17)
- (0:49) MSU – Matt Coghlin 44 yard field goal (Drive: 13 plays, 47 yards, 5:22; Wake Forest 21–20)

Third Quarter

- (10:11) MSU – Brian Lewerke 10 yard pass to Cody White, Matt Coghlin kick (Drive: 10 plays, 73 yards, 4:42; Michigan State 27–21)

Fourth Quarter

- No scoring

Passing

- MSU – Brian Lewerke: 26/37, 320 yards, 1 TD, 1 INT
- WAKE – Jamie Newman: 12/27, 175 yards, 3 TD, 1 INT

Rushing

- MSU – Elijah Collins: 21 carries, 96 yards
- WAKE – Jamie Newman: 17 carries, 87 yards

Receiving

- MSU – Cody White: 8 receptions, 97 yards
- WAKE – Kendall Hinton: 3 receptions, 48 yards, 1 TD

Wake Forest jumped out to a 7–0 lead when quarterback Jamie Newman hit Kendall Hinton for a 29-yard touchdown pass. The Spartans scored ten unanswered points, first on a Matt Coghlin field goal and then on a 15-yard interception return by Mike Panasiuk, to take the lead, 10–7. The Demon Deacons regained the lead on a second quarter touchdown pass from Newman to Donovan Greene, making the score 14–10. The Spartans answered again, scoring a touchdown on an 8-yard scramble by quarterback Brian Lewerke to go ahead 17–14. Newman then threw his third TD pass, this time to Jack Freudenthal, putting Wake Forest up 21–17. MSU tightened the gap to 21–20 with another Coghlin field goal just before halftime. In the third quarter, the lead changed for the fifth time, as Lewerke connected with Cody White for a 10-yard touchdown pass to give MSU a 27–21 lead. MSU failed to put more points on the board with two turnovers in Demon Deacon territory and a missed field goal. However, the Spartan defense was up to the task, holding Wake Forest scoreless in the second half.

Brian Lewerke, who threw for 320 yards and one touchdown while adding 46 rushing yards and a touchdown, was named the game's Most Valuable Player. With 366 total yards, Lewerke surpassed Connor Cook as the all-time Spartans leader in yards from scrimmage.

== Players drafted into the NFL ==
Round	Pick	Player	Position	NFL club
4	137	Josiah Scott	CB	Jacksonville Jaguars
7	225	Kenny Willekes	DE	Minnesota Vikings
