= 2019 Wisconsin Badgers football team =

American college football season

2019 Wisconsin Badgers football

Big Ten West Division co-champion

Big Ten Championship Game, L 21–34 vs. Ohio State

Rose Bowl, L 27–28 vs. Oregon
- Conference: Big Ten Conference
- West Division

Ranking
- Coaches: No. 13
- AP: No. 11
- Record: 10–4 (7–2 Big Ten)
- Head coach: Paul Chryst (5th season)
- Offensive coordinator: Joe Rudolph (5th season)
- Offensive scheme: Pro-style
- Defensive coordinator: Jim Leonhard (3rd season)
- Base defense: 3–4
- MVPs: Jonathan Taylor; Chris Orr
- Captains: Zack Baun; Tyler Biadasz; Jack Coan; Garrett Groshek; Chris Orr; Jonathan Taylor
- Home stadium: Camp Randall Stadium

Uniform
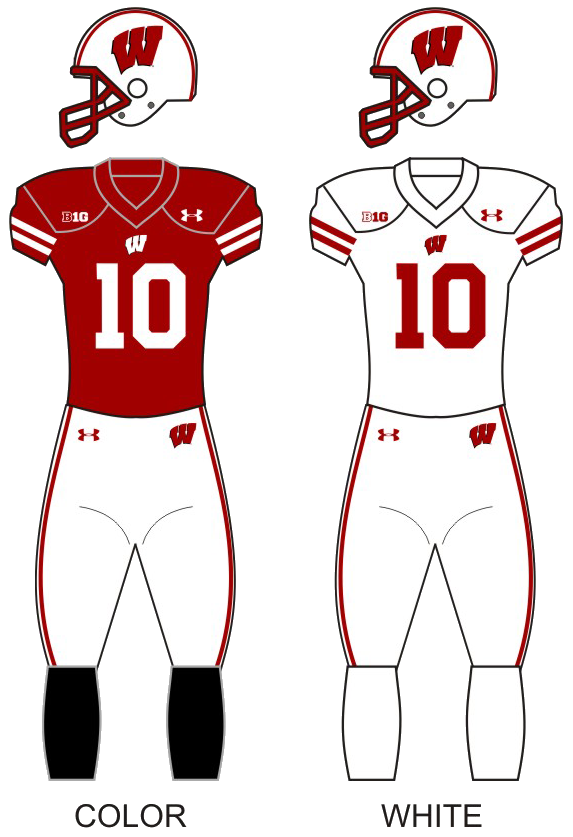

2019 Big Ten Conference football standings
	Conf.			Overall
Team	W		L	W		L
East Division
No. 3 Ohio State xy$^	9	–	0	13	–	1
No. 9 Penn State	7	–	2	11	–	2
No. 18 Michigan	6	–	3	9	–	4
Indiana	5	–	4	8	–	5
Michigan State	4	–	5	7	–	6
Maryland	1	–	8	3	–	9
Rutgers	0	–	9	2	–	10
West Division
No. 11 Wisconsin xy	7	–	2	10	–	4
No. 10 Minnesota x	7	–	2	11	–	2
No. 15 Iowa	6	–	3	10	–	3
Illinois	4	–	5	6	–	7
Purdue	3	–	6	4	–	8
Nebraska	3	–	6	5	–	7
Northwestern	1	–	8	3	–	9
Championship: Ohio State 34, Wisconsin 21
^ – College Football Playoff participant; $ – Conference champion; x – Division champion/co-champions; y – Championship game participant; Rankings from AP Poll

The 2019 Wisconsin Badgers football team represented the University of Wisconsin–Madison in the 2019 NCAA Division I FBS football season. The Badgers were led by fifth-year head coach Paul Chryst and competed as members of the West Division of the Big Ten Conference. They played their home games at Camp Randall Stadium in Madison, Wisconsin.

Wisconsin began the year with six dominating victories, including outscoring their three non-conference opponents 158–0, and beating then-No. 11 Michigan 35–14 in the conference opener. The Badgers rose to sixth in the AP Poll, but suffered their first loss to unranked Illinois, who were 32.5-point underdogs. The next week, Wisconsin lost soundly to Ohio State, 38–7. To close out the regular season, the team beat rival and eighth-ranked Minnesota on the road to secure their place in the Big Ten Championship Game. There, Wisconsin fell to Ohio State a second time, 34–21. They were invited to the Rose Bowl to play Pac-12 Conference champion Oregon, where they lost, 28–27, to end the year with a 10–4 record. It was their fourth Rose Bowl loss in a row, after 3 straight from 2011 to 2013.

The Badgers were led on offense by junior running back Jonathan Taylor, who, for the second consecutive year, was the recipient of the Doak Walker Award and was a unanimous All-American. Taylor finished tied atop the Big Ten Conference and third nationally with Ohio State's J. K. Dobbins with 2,003 yards and 21 touchdowns. Center Tyler Biadasz was also a unanimous All-American. Quarterback Jack Coan led the passing game, finishing with 2,727 yards and 18 touchdowns on the year. Defensively, the team was led by first-team all-conference linebacker Zack Baun, who led the team with 12.5 sacks.

== Offseason ==
=== 2019 NFL draft ===
Round	Pick	Player	Position	NFL Club
3	78	Michael Deiter	OG	Miami Dolphins
5	143	Ryan Connelly	LB	New York Giants
5	151	Andrew Van Ginkel	LB	Miami Dolphins
5	169	David Edwards	OT	Los Angeles Rams
Undrafted		T. J. Edwards	LB	Philadelphia Eagles
Undrafted		Alec Ingold	FB	Oakland Raiders

=== Recruiting ===
Wisconsin signed a total of 19 recruits in the class of 2019. The class was ranked as the sixth best class in the Big Ten Conference and the 27th best class nationally by the 247Sports Composite, and was headlined by consensus five-star offensive lineman Logan Brown and four-star quarterback Graham Mertz, who was rated as the best pocket passer in the country by ESPN. Mertz was named MVP of the high school all-star game the All-American Bowl.

== Preseason ==
=== Award watch lists ===
Listed in the order that they were released

Award	Player	Position	Year
Lott Trophy	Chris Orr	LB	SR
Maxwell Award	Jonathan Taylor	RB	JR
John Mackey Award	Jake Ferguson	TE	SO
Rimington Trophy	Tyler Biadasz	OL	JR
Butkus Award	Zack Baun	OLB	SR
Outland Trophy	Tyler Biadasz	OL	JR
Doak Walker Award	Jonathan Taylor	RB	JR
Walter Camp Award	Jonathan Taylor	RB	JR
Manning Award	Jack Coan	QB	JR

=== Preseason Big Ten poll ===
Although the Big Ten Conference has not held an official preseason poll since 2010, Cleveland.com has polled sports journalists representing all member schools as a de facto preseason media poll since 2011. For the 2019 poll, Wisconsin was projected to finish in third in the West Division.

== Schedule ==
Wisconsin's 2019 schedule began with two non-conference home games, first against South Florida of the American Athletic Conference, and then against Central Michigan of the Mid-American Conference. Wisconsin's third non-conference game, against Kent State, also of the Mid-American Conference, was played in October.

In Big Ten Conference play, Wisconsin played all members of the West Division, and drew Michigan, Michigan State, and Ohio State from the East Division.

The Badgers started the season with two shutouts over South Florida and Central Michigan. However, their signature game came against then-No. 11 Michigan in their Big Ten opener, where the Badgers scored 35 unanswered points to start the game before resting the team's starters and allowing two touchdowns from the Wolverines. The team's dominance continued over the next three games, including a shutout victory over Michigan State. In the first six games, Wisconsin only allowed three combined points from the first half (a field goal by Northwestern). Several analysts saw the Badgers as contenders for a spot in the College Football Playoff.

However, a week before the Ohio State game, the Badgers suffered their first loss, as a 31-point favorite, at Illinois on a game-winning field goal. Several experts marked this moment as a downward turning point for the Badgers, as they were not able to recover in time tor the Ohio State game, losing in Columbus as well.

The Badgers would bounce back, however, with a narrow home victory versus a ranked Iowa, and a blowout win on the road against a top-ten Minnesota. They would then rematch against Ohio State in the Big Ten Championship game, leading for the first three quarters but falling to a late rally from the Buckeyes.

As Big Ten runner up, Wisconsin was invited to the 2020 Rose Bowl to play Pac-12 Champion Oregon. The Badgers lost the game by one point.

Date	Time	Opponent	Rank	Site	TV	Result	Attendance
August 30, 2019	6:00 p.m.	at South Florida*	No. 19	Raymond James Stadium; Tampa, FL	ESPN	W 49–0	46,704
September 7	2:30 p.m.	Central Michigan*	No. 17	Camp Randall Stadium; Madison, WI	BTN	W 61–0	74,437
September 21	11:00 a.m.	No. 11 Michigan	No. 13	Camp Randall Stadium; Madison, WI	FOX	W 35–14	80,245
September 28	11:00 a.m.	Northwestern	No. 8	Camp Randall Stadium; Madison, WI	ABC	W 24–15	76,825
October 5	11:00 a.m.	Kent State*	No. 8	Camp Randall Stadium; Madison, WI	ESPNU	W 48–0	74,559
October 12	2:30 p.m.	Michigan State^{†}	No. 8	Camp Randall Stadium; Madison, WI	BTN	W 38–0	80,470
October 19	11:00 a.m.	at Illinois	No. 6	Memorial Stadium; Champaign, IL	BTN	L 23–24	37,363
October 26	11:00 a.m.	at No. 3 Ohio State	No. 13	Ohio Stadium; Columbus, OH (Big Noon Kickoff)	FOX	L 7–38	102,998
November 9	3:00 p.m.	No. 18 Iowa	No. 13	Camp Randall Stadium; Madison, WI (Heartland Trophy)	FOX	W 24–22	78,018
November 16	11:00 a.m.	at Nebraska	No. 14	Memorial Stadium; Lincoln, NE (Freedom Trophy)	BTN	W 37–21	88,842
November 23	3:00 p.m.	Purdue	No. 12	Camp Randall Stadium; Madison, WI	FOX	W 45–24	70,747
November 30	2:30 p.m.	at No. 8 Minnesota	No. 12	TCF Bank Stadium; Minneapolis, MN (Paul Bunyan's Axe/College GameDay)	ABC	W 38–17	53,756
December 7	7:00 p.m.	vs. No. 1 Ohio State	No. 8	Lucas Oil Stadium; Indianapolis, IN (Big Ten Championship Game)	FOX	L 21–34	66,649
January 1, 2020	4:00 p.m.	vs. No. 6 Oregon*	No. 8	Rose Bowl; Pasadena, CA (Rose Bowl)	ESPN	L 27–28	90,462
*Non-conference game; ^{†}Homecoming; Rankings from AP Poll and CFP Rankings (after November 5) released prior to game; All times are in Central time; Source:

== Roster ==
2019 Wisconsin Badgers football team roster
Players
Coaches
Offense

Pos.	#	Name	Class
WR	1	Aron Cruickshank	So
QB	1	Bryson Baxley	Fr
WR	3	Kendric Pryor	Jr
WR	4	A.J. Taylor	Sr
QB	5	Graham Mertz	Fr
WR	6	Danny Davis III	Jr
RB	7	Bradrick Shaw	Sr
RB	10	Isaac Guerendo	Fr
WR	11	Stephan Bracey	Fr
WR	13	Mike Gregoire	Fr
WR	14	Jordan DiBenedetto	Fr
QB	15	Danny Vanden Boom	So
WR	16	Jack Dunn	Jr
QB	17	Jack Coan (C)	Jr
WR	18	Cam Phillips	Fr
WR	21	Cooper Nelson	Fr
WR	22	Cade Green (injured)	So
RB	23	Jonathan Taylor (C)	Jr
WR	24	Adam Krumholz	Jr
RB	25	Nakia Watson	Fr
FB	28	Quan Easterling	Fr
RB	29	Brady Schipper	Fr
TE	30	Coy Wanner (injured)	So
RB	32	Julius Davis	Fr
FB	34	Mason Stokke	Jr
RB	36	Hunter Johnson	So
RB	37	Garrett Groshek (C)	Jr
TE	41	Jack Eschenbach	Fr
TE	43	Hayden Rucci	Fr
FB	44	John Chenal	So
TE	46	Gabe Lloyd (injured)	Jr
TE	47	Clay Cundiff	Fr
OL	50	Logan Brown	Fr
OL	59	Andrew Lyons	Fr
OL	60	Logan Bruss	So
OL	61	Tyler Biadasz (C)	Jr
OL	62	Logan O'Brien	Fr
OL	65	Tyler Beach	So
OL	67	Cormac Sampson	Fr
OL	68	David Moorman	Sr
OL	69	Aaron Vopal	So
OL	70	Josh Seltzner	So
OL	71	Cole Van Lanen	Jr
OL	73	Alex Fenton	So
OL	74	Michael Furtney	Fr
OL	75	Joe Tippmann	Fr
OL	76	Kayden Lyles	So
OL	77	Blake Smithback	So
OL	78	Jason Erdmann	Sr
WR	81	Taj Mustapha	Fr
WR	82	Emmet Perry	So
TE	84	Jake Ferguson	So
TE	85	Zander Neuville	Sr
TE	86	Luke Benzschawel (injured)	Jr
WR	87	Quintez Cephus	Jr
WR	89	A.J. Abbott	Fr

Defense

Pos.	#	Name	Class
CB	1	Faion Hicks	So
S	2	Reggie Pearson	Fr
CB	4	Donte Burton	Fr
CB	5	Rachad Wildgoose	So
CB	6	Dean Engram	Fr
OLB	7	Spencer Lytle	Fr
CB	8	Deron Harrell	So
S	9	Scott Nelson (injured)	So
ILB	10	Seth Currens	Jr
CB	11	Alexander Smith	Fr
S	12	Titus Toler	Fr
S	18	Collin Wilder	Jr
S	19	John Torchio	Fr
CB	20	Semar Melvin	Fr
CB	21	Caesar Williams	Jr
ILB	22	Jacob Heyroth	Fr
CB	24	James Williams	Fr
S	25	Eric Burrell	Jr
CB	26	Travian Blaylock	Fr
CB	27	Cristian Volpentesta	Jr
ILB	29	Jackson Kollath	Fr
S	30	Tyler Mais	So
S	31	Madison Cone	Jr
ILB	32	Marty Strey	Fr
CB	36	Kobe Knaak	Jr
S	38	Dante Caputo	Fr
ILB	39	Tatum Grass	Fr
OLB	41	Noah Burks	Jr
OLB	42	Jaylan Franklin	Fr
ILB	45	Leo Chenal	Fr
OLB	46	Hegeman Tiedt	Jr
ILB	48	Travis Wiltjer	Sr
OLB	49	Christian Bell	Jr
OLB	50	Izayah Green-May	So
DE	51	Giovanni Paez	Fr
DE	52	David Pfaff	Sr
ILB	54	Chris Orr (C)	Sr
ILB	55	Maema Njongmeta	Fr
OLB	56	Zack Baun (C)	Sr
DE	56	Rodas Johnson	Fr
DE	57	Michael Balistreri	So
ILB	57	Jack Sanborn	So
ILB	58	Mike Maskalunas	Jr
OLB	59	Tyler Johnson	Sr
NT	74	Gunnar Roberge	Sr
DE	90	Isaiah Mullens	Fr
NT	91	Bryson Williams	So
DE	92	Matt Henningsen	So
DE	93	Garrett Rand	Jr
DE	94	Boyd Dietzen	Fr
NT	95	Keeanu Benton	Fr
DE	97	Isaiahh Loudermilk	Jr
DE	98	C.J. Goetz	Fr

Special teams

Pos.	#	Name	Class
P	15	Anthony Lotti	Sr
K	19	Collin Larsh	So
K	28	Blake Wilcox	Fr
K	39	Zach Hintze	Sr
LS	51	Adam Bay	Jr
LS	52	Josh Bernhagen (injured)	Jr
LS	63	Peter Bowden	Fr
P	90	Connor Allen	Sr
P	96	Conor Schlichting	So

Head coach

- Paul Chryst (Wisconsin)

Coordinators/assistant coaches

- Joe Rudolph (Wisconsin)
  Associate head coach, offensive coordinator, offensive line
- Jim Leonhard (Wisconsin)
  Defensive coordinator, defensive backs
- Bobby April (Louisiana-Lafayette)
  Outside linebackers
- Bob Bostad (Wisconsin–Stevens Point)
  Inside linebackers
- Inoke Breckterfield (Oregon State)
  Defensive line
- Jon Budmayr (Wisconsin)
  Quarterbacks
- Ted Gilmore (Wyoming)
  Offensive pass game coordinator, wide receivers
- Chris Haering (West Virginia)
  Special teams
- John Settle (Appalachian State)
  Running backs
- Mickey Turner (Wisconsin)
  Tight ends
- Ross Kolodziej (Wisconsin)
  Head strength and conditioning coach

Legend

- (C) Team captain
- (S) Suspended
- (I) Ineligible
- Injured
- Redshirt

Roster
Last update: November 19, 2019

== Rankings ==
Ranking movements Legend: ██ Increase in ranking ██ Decrease in ranking т = Tied with team above or below
	Week																
Poll	Pre	1	2	3	4	5	6	7	8	9	10	11	12	13	14	15	Final
AP	19	17	14	13-T	8	8	8	6	13	18	16	15	14	13	10	11	11
Coaches	17–T	16	14	14	9	9	8	6	13	17	16	15	14	14	10	11	13
CFP	Not released										13	14	12	12	8	8	Not released

== Game summaries ==
=== At South Florida ===
	1	2	3	4	Total
No. 19 Badgers	7	21	14	7	49
Bulls	0	0	0	0	0

=== Central Michigan ===
	1	2	3	4	Total
Chippewas	0	0	0	0	0
No. 17 Badgers	16	28	10	7	61

=== Michigan ===
	1	2	3	4	Total
No. 11 Wolverines	0	0	8	6	14
No. 13 Badgers	14	14	7	0	35

=== Northwestern ===
	1	2	3	4	Total
Wildcats	3	0	0	12	15
No. 8 Badgers	7	0	7	10	24

This was the first game of the season where the Badgers allowed an opponent to score points in the first half.

=== Kent State ===
	1	2	3	4	Total
Golden Flashes	0	0	0	0	0
No. 8 Badgers	7	21	13	7	48

=== Michigan State ===
	1	2	3	4	Total
Spartans	0	0	0	0	0
No. 8 Badgers	7	10	0	21	38

Wisconsin became the first FBS team since Oklahoma in 1967 to put up 4 shutouts in its first 6 games after their game against Michigan State.

=== At Illinois ===
	1	2	3	4	Total
No. 6 Badgers	7	6	7	3	23
Fighting Illini	0	7	7	10	24

No. 6 Wisconsin was upset on the road by unranked Illinois, who took the lead for the first time in the entire game as the clock ran out, with a 39-yard field goal. The loss, along with the loss to Ohio State in the following week, all but ended Wisconsin's national championship hopes.

=== At Ohio State (regular season) ===
	1	2	3	4	Total
No. 13 Badgers	0	0	7	0	7
No. 3 Buckeyes	0	10	14	14	38

=== Iowa ===
	1	2	3	4	Total
No. 18 Hawkeyes	3	3	0	16	22
No. 16 Badgers	0	14	7	3	24

=== At Nebraska ===
	1	2	3	4	Total
No. 14 Badgers	7	20	7	3	37
Cornhuskers	7	7	7	0	21

=== Purdue ===
	1	2	3	4	Total
Boilermakers	3	14	7	0	24
No. 12 Badgers	14	10	14	7	45

=== At Minnesota ===
	1	2	3	4	Total
No. 12 Badgers	0	10	14	14	38
No. 8 Golden Gophers	7	0	3	7	17

=== Vs. Ohio State (Big Ten Championship game) ===
	1	2	3	4	Total
No. 1 Buckeyes	0	7	17	10	34
No. 8 Badgers	7	14	0	0	21

This was Wisconsin 3rd rematch in a Big Ten Championship Game. Previously the Badgers played and beat Michigan State in 2011 and Nebraska in 2012 after losing to them in their regular season matchup.

=== Vs. Oregon (Rose Bowl) ===
	1	2	3	4	Total
No. 8 Badgers	10	7	7	3	27
No. 6 Ducks	7	7	7	7	28

== Awards and honors ==
Weekly Awards
Player	Award	Date awarded	Ref.
Jonathan Taylor	Big Ten Offensive Player of the Week	September 2, 2019	
Jonathan Taylor	Big Ten Offensive Player of the Week	September 23, 2019	
Chris Orr	Big Ten Defensive Player of the Week	September 30, 2019	
Jonathan Taylor	Big Ten Offensive Player of the Week	October 7, 2019	
Jonathan Taylor	Big Ten Offensive Player of the Week	November 18, 2019	
Aron Cruickshank	Big Ten Co-Special Teams Player of the Week	November 18, 2019	

Individual Awards
Player	Award	Ref.
Jonathan Taylor	Doak Walker Award	
Tyler Biadasz	Rimington Trophy	
Jonathan Taylor	Ameche—Dayne Running Back of the Year	
Jonathan Taylor	First Team All-Big Ten Offense (Coaches/Media)	
Tyler Biadasz	First Team All-Big Ten Offense (Coaches/Media)	
Zack Baun	First Team All-Big Ten Defense (Coaches/Media)	
Chris Orr	Second Team All-Big Ten Defense (Coaches/Media)	
Aron Cruickshank	Second Team All-Big Ten Special Teams (Coaches/Media)	
Cole Van Lanen	Second Team All-Big Ten Offense (Media) / Honorable Mention (Coaches)	
Logan Bruss	Honorable Mention Offense (Coaches/Media)	
Quintez Cephus	Honorable Mention Offense (Coaches/Media)	
Jake Ferguson	Honorable Mention Offense (Coaches/Media)	
Eric Burrell	Honorable Mention Defense (Coaches/Media)	
Faion Hicks	Honorable Mention Defense (Coaches/Media)	
Isaiahh Loudermilk	Honorable Mention Defense (Coaches/Media)	
Jack Coan	Honorable Mention Offense (Media)	
Matt Henningsen	Honorable Mention Offense (Coaches)	
Rachad Wildgoose	Honorable Mention Defense (Media)	

== Players drafted into the NFL ==
Round	Pick	Player	Position	NFL Club
2	41	Jonathan Taylor	RB	Indianapolis Colts
3	74	Zack Baun	OLB	New Orleans Saints
4	146	Tyler Biadasz	C	Dallas Cowboys
5	166	Quintez Cephus	WR	Detroit Lions
