= Zack Baun =

American football player (born 1996)

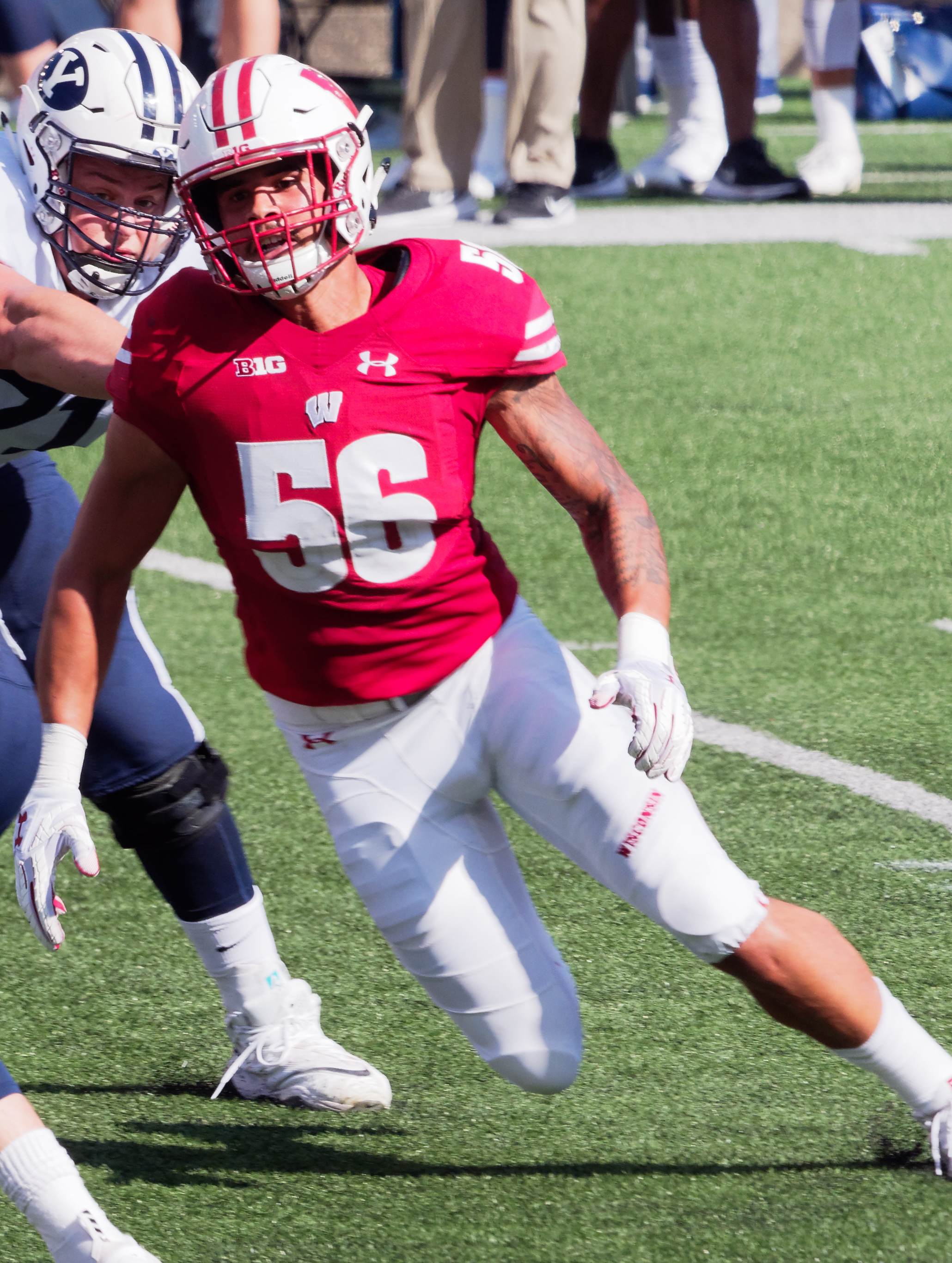
- Baun with the Wisconsin Badgers in 2018

No. 53 – Philadelphia Eagles
- Position: Linebacker
- Roster status: Injured reserve

Personal information
- Born: December 30, 1996 (age 29); Milwaukee, Wisconsin, U.S.
- Listed height: 6 ft 3 in (1.91 m)
- Listed weight: 225 lb (102 kg)

Career information
- High school: Brown Deer (Brown Deer, Wisconsin)
- College: Wisconsin (2015–2019)
- NFL draft: 2020: 3rd round, 74th overall pick

Career history
- New Orleans Saints (2020–2023); Philadelphia Eagles (2024–present)

Awards and highlights
- Super Bowl champion (LIX); First-team All-Pro (2024); 2× Pro Bowl (2024, 2025); Butkus Award (pro) (2024); Consensus All-American (2019); First-team All-Big Ten (2019)

Career NFL statistics as of Week 9, 2026
- Total tackles: 427
- Sacks: 11.0
- Forced fumbles: 6
- Fumble recoveries: 3
- Pass deflections: 18
- Interceptions: 4
- Stats at Pro Football Reference

Zack Baun (born December 30, 1996) is an American professional football linebacker for the Philadelphia Eagles of the National Football League (NFL). He played college football for the Wisconsin Badgers and was selected by the New Orleans Saints 10th in the third round of the 2020 NFL draft (Pick 74). He played four years with the Saints before having a breakout year with the Eagles, being named a Pro Bowler and a first-team All-Pro, and finishing fifth in Defensive Player of the Year voting.

== Early life ==
Baun grew up in West Bend, Wisconsin and initially attended West Bend East High School. His family moved to Brown Deer, Wisconsin after his sophomore year and he transferred to Brown Deer High School, where he played basketball and football and ran track. Baun moved from playing wide receiver at West Bend to quarterback and linebacker at Brown Deer. As a senior, Baun was named the Wisconsin Football Coaches Association (WFCA) State Offensive Player of the Year and was also named Dave Krieg State Quarterback of the Year after passing for 1,936 yards and 20 touchdowns and rushing for 1,837 yards and a state-leading 39 touchdowns. Baun committed to play college football at Wisconsin with the intention of gray shirting his freshman year. In basketball, Baun was a starter for Brown Deer's 2013 WIAA Division II State Championship team and he placed in the Division II state track championship in both the 100 meter and 200 meter dashes.

== College career ==
Baun redshirted his true freshman season after breaking his left foot going into the season. He appeared in 12 games as a redshirt freshman, making 15 tackles (3.5 for loss) with a forced fumble. Baun missed the entirety of his redshirt sophomore season after re-injuring his left foot during spring practices. Baun was named a starter at outside linebacker for the Badgers going into his redshirt junior season and finished the season as the team's third-leading tackler with 63 stops (7.5 for a loss) with 2.5 sacks, 3 pass breakups, one interception and a fumble recovery.

Baun entered his redshirt senior season on the watchlist for the Butkus Award and was voted to be a team captain. He was named midseason All-American by the Associated Press and Sporting News after leading the Badgers in sacks (6), tackles for loss (10.5), and forced fumbles (2) through the first six games of the season. Baun finished the season with 76 tackles, 19.5 tackles for loss and 12.5 sacks and was named first team All-Big Ten and a first team All-American by the Football Writers Association of America and the Walter Camp Football Foundation.

== Professional career ==
Pre-draft measurables
Height	Weight	Arm length	Hand span	Wingspan	40-yard dash	10-yard split	20-yard split	20-yard shuttle	Three-cone drill	Vertical jump	Broad jump	Bench press
6 ft 2 3/8 in (1.89 m)	238 lb (108 kg)	32 3/4 in (0.83 m)	9 5/8 in (0.24 m)	6 ft 6 1/4 in (1.99 m)	4.65 s	1.54 s	2.74 s	4.20 s	7.00 s	32.5 in (0.83 m)	9 ft 7 in (2.92 m)	24 reps
All values from NFL Combine/Pro Day

=== New Orleans Saints ===
Baun was selected by the New Orleans Saints in the third round with the 74th pick in the 2020 NFL draft. Baun made his debut on September 21, 2020, on Monday Night Football against the Las Vegas Raiders, playing on special teams.

On December 17, 2022, Baun was placed on season–ending injured reserve with a calf injury he had suffered in Week 9 against the Baltimore Ravens.

=== Philadelphia Eagles ===
On March 13, 2024, Baun signed a one-year contract with the Philadelphia Eagles. He transitioned to inside linebacker during the offseason. In Week 1 of the 2024 season, he recorded 15 total tackles and 2 sacks in his first career multi-sack game in a 34–29 win over the Green Bay Packers in São Paulo, Brazil. He was named NFC Defensive Player of the Week following his performance in Week 10, where he recorded two forced fumbles and a fumble recovery in a 34–6 win over the Dallas Cowboys. In 2024, Baun was selected to his first Pro Bowl. In addition, Baun was named an Associated Press first-team All-Pro and nominated for Defensive Player of the Year, placing fifth in the voting.

On January 12, 2025, Baun recorded his first postseason interception against the Green Bay Packers in the Wild Card playoff game. He earned his second postseason interception against the Kansas City Chiefs in Super Bowl LIX, leading to an Eagles touchdown two plays later. The Eagles went on to defeat the Chiefs by a score of 40–22, giving Baun his first Super Bowl championship. Baun ended the game as the Eagles' leading defender, recording seven tackles and one interception.

On March 5, 2025, Baun agreed to a three-year, $51 million contract with the Eagles after a career season, with $34 million in guaranteed money. Baun was one of a dozen Eagles players of the Super Bowl LIX championship team that did not participate in the White House visit in April 2025. Baun built on his breakout 2024 season, posting 123 tackles (64 solo), 3.5 sacks, 2 interceptions, and a forced fumble across 16 starts. He was selected to the Pro Bowl for a second year in a row.

In Week 1 in the 2026 NFL season, Baun posted 12 tackles, two pass breakups and one tackle for a loss and was named NFC Defensive Player of the Week for his efforts.

== Career statistics ==
=== NFL ===
Legend
	Won the Super Bowl
	Led the league
**Bold**	Career high

==== Regular season ====
Year	Team	Games		Tackles					Fumbles					Interceptions					
Year	Team	GP	GS	Cmb	Solo	Ast	Sck	TFL	FF	Fum	FR	Yds	TD	Int	Yds	Avg	Lng	TD	PD
2020	NO	15	3	12	7	5	0.0	1	0	0	0	0	0	0	0	0.0	0	0	0
2021	NO	17	4	30	22	8	0.0	0	0	0	0	0	0	0	0	0.0	0	0	0
2022	NO	13	1	16	11	5	0.0	1	0	0	0	0	0	0	0	0.0	0	0	0
2023	NO	17	6	30	20	10	2.0	4	1	**1**	0	0	0	1	**10**	**10.0**	**10**	0	2
2024	PHI	16	16	**151**	**93**	58	**3.5**	**11**	**5**	0	**1**	0	0	1	0	0.0	0	0	4
2025	PHI	16	16	123	64	**59**	**3.5**	7	1	0	**1**	0	0	**2**	0	0.0	0	0	**7**
2026	PHI	8	8	65	34	31	2.0	8	0	0	1	0	0	0	0	0.0	0	0	5
Career		102	54	427	251	176	11.0	32	6	1	3	0	0	4	10	2.5	10	0	18

==== Postseason ====
Year	Team	Games		Tackles					Fumbles					Interceptions					
Year	Team	GP	GS	Cmb	Solo	Ast	Sck	TFL	FF	Fum	FR	Yds	TD	Int	Yds	Avg	Lng	TD	PD
2020	NO	2	0	3	2	1	0.0	0	0	0	0	0	0	0	0	0.0	0	0	0
2024	PHI	4	4	**33**	**20**	**13**	0.0	**2**	**1**	0	**2**	0	0	**2**	**16**	**8.0**	**16**	0	**3**
2025	PHI	1	1	6	3	3	0.0	0	0	0	0	0	0	0	0	0.0	0	0	0
Career		7	5	42	25	17	0.0	2	1	0	2	0	0	2	16	8.0	16	0	3

=== College ===
Year	Team	GP	Tackles					Fumbles				Interceptions					
Year	Team	GP	Cmb	Solo	Ast	Sck	TFL	FF	FR	Yds	TD	Int	Yds	Avg	Lng	TD	PD
2016	Wisconsin	12	15	9	6	0.0	3.5	1	0	0	0	0	0	—	0	0	0
2017	Wisconsin	0	did not play due to injury														
2018	Wisconsin	13	63	37	**26**	2.5	7.5	0	**1**	0	0	**1**	7	7.0	7	0	**2**
2019	Wisconsin	14	**76**	**53**	23	**12.5**	**19.5**	**2**	0	0	0	**1**	**34**	**34.0**	**34**	0	**2**
Career		39	154	99	55	15.0	30.5	3	1	0	0	2	41	20.5	34	0	4
