= 2019 Big Ten Football Championship Game =

- Conference Championship
Ohio State Buckeyes	Wisconsin Badgers
(12–0)	(10–2)
34	21
Head coach: Ryan Day	Head coach: Paul Chryst
AP / Coaches / CFP; 2 / 2 / 1	AP / Coaches / CFP; 10 / 10 / 8
	1	2	3	4	Total
Ohio State	0	7	17	10	34
Wisconsin	7	14	0	0	21
- Date: December 7, 2019
- Season: 2019
- Stadium: Lucas Oil Stadium
- Location: Indianapolis, Indiana
- MVP: Justin Fields, QB, Ohio State
- Favorite: Ohio State by 16.5
- Referee: Dan Capron
- Attendance: 66,649

United States TV coverage
- Network: FOX
- Announcers: Gus Johnson (play-by-play), Joel Klatt (analyst) and Jenny Taft (sideline)
- Nielsen ratings: 7.6 (13.55 million)

2019 Big Ten Conference football standings
	Conf.			Overall
Team	W		L	W		L
East Division
No. 3 Ohio State xy$^	9	–	0	13	–	1
No. 9 Penn State	7	–	2	11	–	2
No. 18 Michigan	6	–	3	9	–	4
Indiana	5	–	4	8	–	5
Michigan State	4	–	5	7	–	6
Maryland	1	–	8	3	–	9
Rutgers	0	–	9	2	–	10
West Division
No. 11 Wisconsin xy	7	–	2	10	–	4
No. 10 Minnesota x	7	–	2	11	–	2
No. 15 Iowa	6	–	3	10	–	3
Illinois	4	–	5	6	–	7
Purdue	3	–	6	4	–	8
Nebraska	3	–	6	5	–	7
Northwestern	1	–	8	3	–	9
Championship: Ohio State 34, Wisconsin 21
^ – College Football Playoff participant; $ – Conference champion; x – Division champion/co-champions; y – Championship game participant; Rankings from AP Poll

The 2019 Big Ten Football Championship Game presented by Discover was played on December 7, 2019, at Lucas Oil Stadium in Indianapolis, Indiana. The ninth annual Big Ten Football Championship Game, it determined the 2019 champion of the Big Ten Conference. The game was between the No. 1 Ohio State Buckeyes out of the East division, and the No. 8 Wisconsin Badgers out of the West division. Ohio State won the game and the conference title by a score of 34–21.

== History ==
The 2020 Championship Game will be the tenth in the Big Ten's 125-year history and the seventh to feature the conference's East and West alignment. East division champion Ohio State won the 2018 game over West division champion Northwestern by a score of 45–24. It was Ohio State's third consecutive and fourth overall victory in the Championship Game.

== Teams ==
Ohio State and Wisconsin faced each other in the Big Ten Championship Game for the third time. Ohio State won each of the last two championship games between the two schools, in 2014 and 2017. The Buckeyes and Badgers also met during the 2019 regular season, where Ohio State won by a score of 38–7 in Columbus, Ohio.

=== Ohio State ===
Ohio State secured their place in the Championship Game by winning the East Division with an undefeated 12–0 (9–0 Big Ten) regular season record. This was Ohio State's fifth appearance in the Championship Game, and third consecutive. They were the two-time reigning conference champions. The Buckeyes were ranked first in the College Football Playoff rankings heading into the game.

=== Wisconsin ===
Wisconsin finished the regular season at 10–2 (7–2 Big Ten), tied atop the West Division with Minnesota. The Badgers defeated their rivals, the Golden Gophers, in the final game of the regular season to earn their way to the Championship Game on the head-to-head tiebreaker. This is Wisconsin's sixth appearance in the Big Ten Championship Game.

== Game summary ==
2019 Big Ten Football Championship Game

Quarter	1	2	3	4	Total
No. 1 Ohio State	0	7	17	10	34
No. 8 Wisconsin	7	14	0	0	21

at Lucas Oil Stadium • Indianapolis, Indiana

- Date: Saturday, December 7, 2019
- Game time: 8:00 p.m. EST
- Game weather: Indoors (roof closed)
- Game attendance: 66,649
- Referee: Dan Capron
- TV announcers (FOX): Gus Johnson (play-by-play), Joel Klatt (analyst) and Jenny Taft (sideline)
- ESPN game summary

Game information

First Quarter

- (12:57) WIS – Jonathan Taylor 44 yard rush, Zach Hintze kick (Drive: 5 plays, 83 yards, 2:03; Wisconsin 7–0)

Second Quarter

- (9:41) WIS – Jack Coan 14 yard rush, Zach Hintze kick (Drive: 14 plays, 80 yards, 6:39; Wisconsin 14–0)
- (0:42) OHST – J. K. Dobbins 2 yard rush, Blake Haubeil kick (Drive: 10 plays, 71 yards, 2:36; Wisconsin 14–7)
- (0:10) WIS – Jack Coan 1 yard rush, Zach Hintze kick (Drive: 4 plays, 75 yards, 0:32; Wisconsin 21–7)

Third Quarter

- (13:21) OHST – Justin Fields 16 yard pass to Jeremy Ruckert, Blake Haubeil kick (Drive: 5 plays, 75 yards, 1:39; Wisconsin 21–14)
- (10:45) OHST – Blake Haubeil 27 yard field goal (Drive: 4 plays, 6 yards, 1:11; Wisconsin 21–17)
- (2:23) OHST – Justin Fields 16 yard pass to K. J. Hill, Blake Haubeil kick (Drive: 7 plays, 69 yards, 3:13; Ohio State 24–21)

Fourth Quarter

- (12:09) OHST – Justin Fields 13 yard pass to K. J. Hill, Blake Haubeil kick (Drive: 9 plays, 65 yards, 3:02; Ohio State 31–21)
- (4:40) OHST – Blake Haubeil 24 yard field goal (Drive: 12 plays, 62 yards, 5:56; Ohio State 34–21)

=== Statistics ===
Statistics	OHST	WIS
First downs	28	23
Plays–yards	78–492	71–432
Rushes–yards	46–172	37–200
Passing yards	320	232
Passing: comp–att–int	20–32–0	17–34–0
Turnovers		
Time of possession	31:46	28:14

Team	Category	Player	Statistics
Ohio State	Passing	Justin Fields	19/31, 299 yards, 3 TD
Ohio State	Rushing	J. K. Dobbins	33 carries, 172 yards, 1 TD
Ohio State	Receiving	Chris Olave	5 receptions, 94 yards
Wisconsin	Passing	Jack Coan	17/33, 232 yards
Wisconsin	Rushing	Jonathan Taylor	20 carries, 148 yards, 1 TD
Wisconsin	Receiving	Quintez Cephus	7 receptions, 122 yards

Wisconsin received the opening kickoff and completed an 83-yard drive, ending with a 44-yard touchdown run by Jonathan Taylor to take the early lead. Ohio State's opening drive resulted in a turnover on downs at the Wisconsin 34 yard line. Early in the second quarter, Wisconsin scored again via a 14-yard run by quarterback Jack Coan. The Buckeyes got on the board with 42 seconds remaining in the half via a two-yard run by J. K. Dobbins. Wisconsin was able to rattle off another touchdown drive in the final seconds thanks to a 45-yard run by Jonathan Taylor and a 24-yard pass from Coan to Quintez Cephus, and scored with a one-yard run by Coan to take a 21–7 lead into half-time.

Ohio State received the ball first in the second half and scored via a 16-yard pass from Justin Fields to Jeremy Ruckert. After a muffed punt snap by Wisconsin on their own 16 yard line, Ohio State converted a 27-yard field goal to cut Wisconsin's lead to 21–17. Wisconsin kicker Zach Hintze missed a 48-yard field goal attempt on the following drive. Ohio State then took the lead late in the third quarter with a 16-yard touchdown pass from Fields to K. J. Hill. Ohio State scored once again early in the fourth quarter with another connection between Fields and Hill, this time from 13 yards out. The Buckeye defense continued to hold the Badger offense from moving the ball, and on the next possession Ohio State kicked a 24-yard field goal that made the score 34–21 with 4:39 remaining, which held until the end of the game.

With the win, Ohio State won their third consecutive Big Ten championship game, and 38th overall Big Ten title. The Buckeyes became the first team to ever win ten conference games in a single season, the Conference Championship Game being the tenth win. Quarterback Justin Fields passed for 299 yards and three touchdowns, and was named game MVP.

== Aftermath ==
Ohio State, who had been ranked first in the College Football Playoff rankings heading into the game, dropped to number two behind LSU in the final rankings. LSU beat then-No. 4 Georgia 37–10 in the SEC Championship Game on the same day. As a result, Ohio State received a bid to the national semifinal against third-seeded Clemson to be played at the Fiesta Bowl. Wisconsin stayed at number eight in the CFP rankings and received a bid to the Rose Bowl. The Buckeyes lost to Clemson, 29–23; and the Badgers lost to Oregon, 28–27.

== See also ==
- List of Big Ten Conference football champions
