= Chris Orr (American football) =

American football player and coach (born 1997)

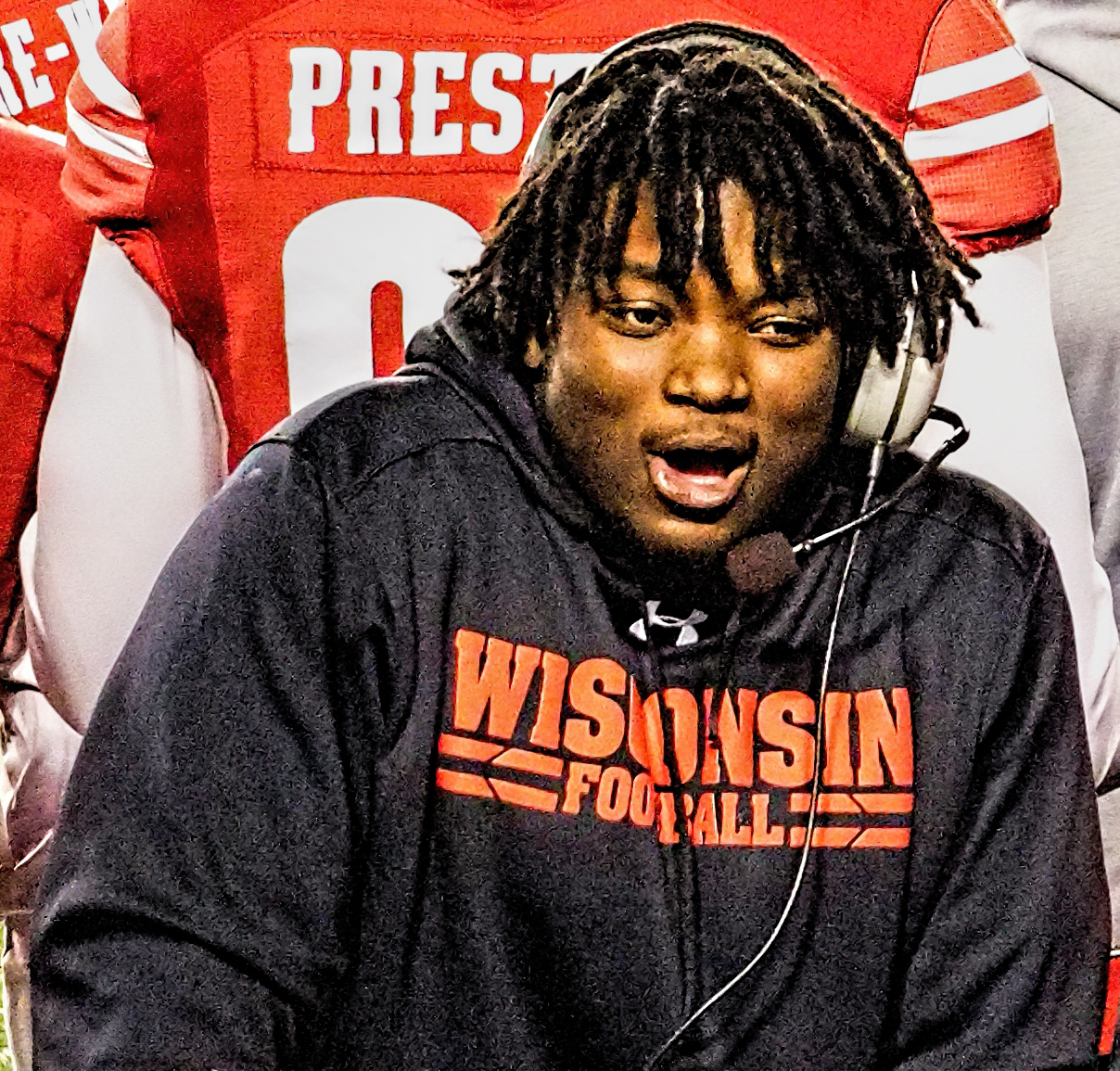
- Orr at Wisconsin in 2016

Kansas City Chiefs
- Title: Defensive quality control coach

Personal information
- Born: June 17, 1997 (age 29); DeSoto, Texas, U.S.
- Listed height: 6 ft 0 in (1.83 m)
- Listed weight: 224 lb (102 kg)

Career information
- Position: Linebacker (No. 45)
- High school: DeSoto (DeSoto, Texas)
- College: Wisconsin (2016–2019)
- NFL draft: 2020: undrafted

Career history

Playing
- Carolina Panthers (2020); New Jersey Generals (2022–2023); Birmingham Stallions (2024)*
- * Offseason or practice squad member only

Coaching
- Baylor (2024) Graduate assistant; Jackson State (2024) Linebackers coach & run game coordinator; Kansas City Chiefs (2025–present) Defensive quality control coach

Operations
- Wisconsin (2021–2023) Director of player development

Awards and highlights
- All-USFL Team (2023); Second-team All-Big Ten (2019)
- Stats at Pro Football Reference

Chris Orr (born June 17, 1997) is an American football coach and former linebacker who is the defensive quality control coach for the Kansas City Chiefs of the National Football League (NFL). He played linebacker for the Wisconsin Badgers in college and for the Carolina Panthers of the National Football League (NFL). He also played for the New Jersey Generals of the United States Football League (USFL).

== Early life ==
During his career at DeSoto High School, Orr had 374 total tackles, 13 forced fumbles, four fumble recoveries and three defensive TDs.

== College career ==
During his first season with Wisconsin, Orr played in 10 games and made six starts. In those games, he registered 46 total tackles, two tackles for loss, and had 0.5 sacks. During his second season with Wisconsin, Orr appeared in one game and made one start, but he suffered a season-ending torn ACL on his first defensive snap of the season. During his third season with Wisconsin, Orr played in 12 games and made eight starts. In those games, he made 36 total tackles, three tackles for loss, had two sacks, and had one interception. During his junior season at Wisconsin, Orr played in all 13 games and made one start. In those games, he had 27 tackles, one tackle for loss, two fumble recoveries and one interception. He also won the team's Special Teams Player of the Year award during this season.

During his senior season at Wisconsin, Orr played in and started all 14 games. In those games, as a team captain, he had 78 tackles, 14 tackles for loss, and 11.5 sacks. He also had eight quarterback hurries, broke up five passes and forced two fumbles. His 11.5 sacks during this season were the most in a season by an inside/middle linebacker in school history, and he helped lead his team to a single-season school record 51 sacks as a team.

=== College statistics ===
Season	Team	Games		Tackles						Int & Fum			
Season	Team	GP	GS	Solo	Ast	Cmb	TfL	Yds	Sck	Int	PD	FF	FR
2015	Wisconsin	10	6	24	22	46	2.0	11	0.5	0	2	0	1
2016	Wisconsin	1	1	Redshirted - Injury									
2017	Wisconsin	12	8	20	16	36	3.0	12	2.0	1	1	0	0
2018	Wisconsin	13	1	14	13	27	1.0	2	0.0	1	0	0	2
2019	Wisconsin	14	14	42	36	78	14.0	87	11.5	0	5	2	1
Career		50	30	100	87	187	20.0	112	14.0	2	8	2	4

== Professional career ==
Pre-draft measurables
Height	Weight	Arm length	Hand span	Wingspan	40-yard dash	10-yard split	20-yard split	20-yard shuttle	Three-cone drill	Vertical jump	Broad jump	Bench press
5 ft 10 3/4 in (1.80 m)	223 lb (101 kg)	30 7/8 in (0.78 m)	9 3/8 in (0.24 m)	6 ft 1 1/8 in (1.86 m)	4.78 s	1.71 s	2.82 s	4.28 s	7.15 s	36.5 in (0.93 m)	9 ft 2 in (2.79 m)	20 reps
All values from Pro Day

=== Carolina Panthers ===
Orr went undrafted in the 2020 NFL draft. On April 30, 2020, Orr was signed by the Carolina Panthers as an undrafted free agent. He was waived on September 5, and signed to the practice squad the next day. He was elevated to the active roster on October 3 and November 14 for the team's weeks 4 and 10 games against the Arizona Cardinals and Tampa Bay Buccaneers, and reverted to the practice squad after each game. He was signed to the active roster on November 21. Orr was waived on December 12, and re-signed to the practice squad three days later. He signed a reserve/future contract with the Panthers on January 4, 2021. Orr was waived on May 24.

=== New Jersey Generals ===
Orr was drafted by the New Jersey Generals in the 21st round of the 2022 USFL draft. He was transferred to the team's inactive roster on May 20, 2022, with a knee injury.

Orr re-signed with the Generals on July 14, 2023. The Generals folded when the XFL and USFL merged to create the United Football League (UFL).

=== Birmingham Stallions ===
On January 5, 2024, Orr was selected by the Birmingham Stallions during the 2024 UFL dispersal draft. He was placed on the retired list on March 13.

== Coaching career ==
Before Orr was drafted by the New Jersey Generals, he was the Wisconsin Director of Player Development.

On May 1, 2024, Orr was hired to be the linebackers coach for Jackson State.

On February 12, 2025, Orr was hired by the Kansas City Chiefs to join their coaching staff as their defensive quality control coach.

== Personal life ==
Orr's father is two-time Super Bowl champion and former Washington Redskins tight end Terry Orr. His two brothers, Zach and Nick, also played professional football. Zach was the defensive coordinator for the Baltimore Ravens.
