= Trinity Catholic High School (Missouri) =

Closed high school in Missouri, US

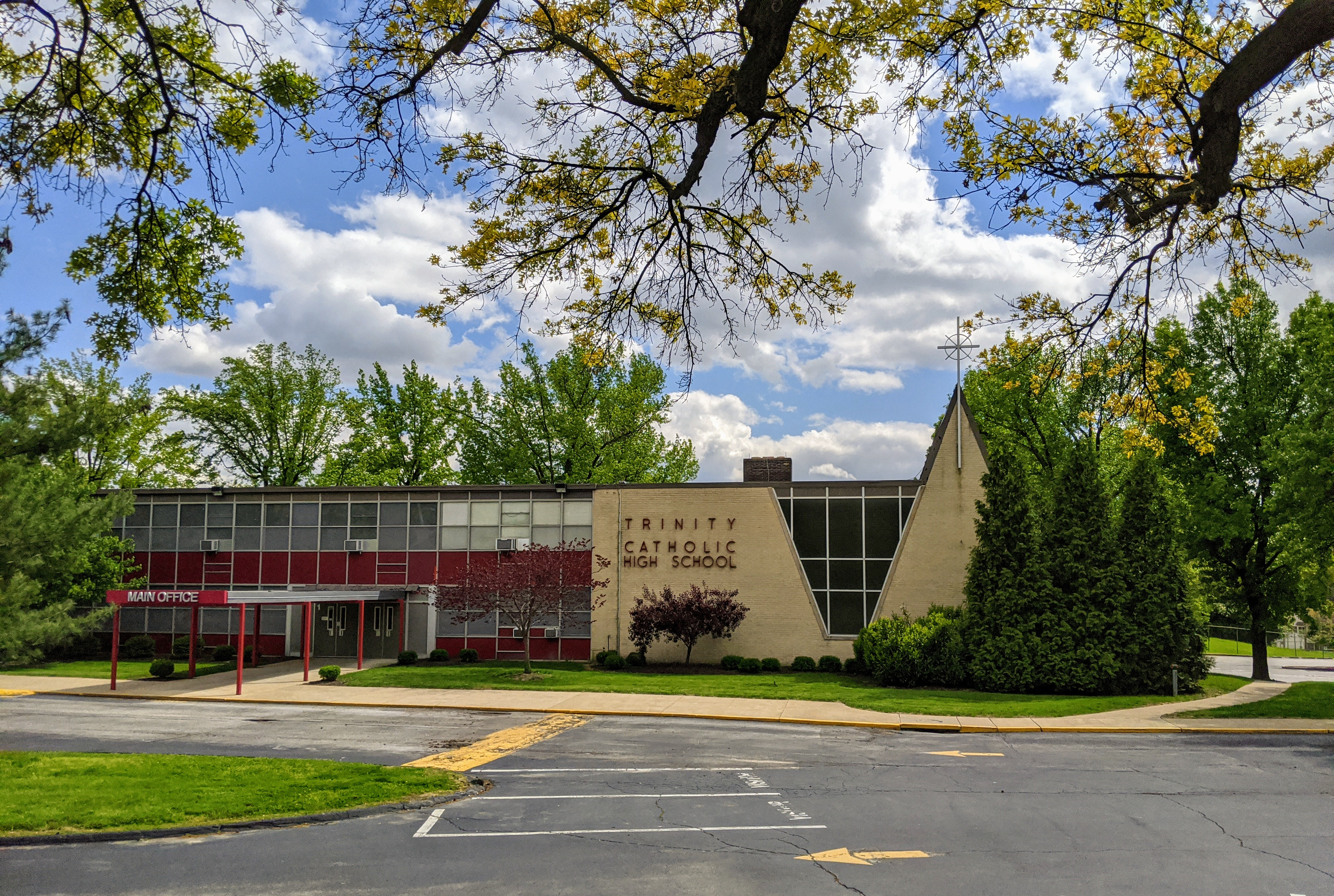

Location
- 1720 Redman Road; St. Louis County, Missouri 63138; United States; 38°47′5″N 90°13′24″W

Information
- Type: Private, Coeducational
- Motto: Latin: Ex Trinitate Unitas (From Trinity Comes Unity)
- Religious affiliation: Roman Catholic
- Established: 2003
- Closed: 2021
- Oversight: Archdiocese of St. Louis
- Grades: 9–12
- Colors: Crimson, silver, and white
- Athletics conference: Archdiocesan Athletic Association
- Nickname: Titans
- Accreditation: North Central Association of Colleges and Schools
- Newspaper: Titan Times
- Website: trinitycatholichigh.org (archived)

Trinity Catholic High School was a private, Catholic high school in Spanish Lake Township, St. Louis County, Missouri. It was located in the Archdiocese of Saint Louis. The school closed in 2021.

== History ==
Trinity Catholic was established in 2003 from the merger of St. Thomas Aquinas-Mercy and Rosary high schools to serve north St. Louis County. Its school building had opened in 1959.

The origins of Trinity Catholic began with Mercy High School, established in 1948 as a co-educational institution serving central St. Louis City and County. Operated by the Sisters of Mercy, Mercy High School functioned for nearly 40 years until its closure in 1985, when it merged with St. Thomas Aquinas High School in Florissant.

St. Thomas Aquinas High School, founded in 1954 and named after the 13th-century philosopher and patron saint of education, was initially housed at Sacred Heart Parish in Florissant. The school was under the leadership of the Sisters of St. Joseph, and moved to its permanent location at Dunn Road in 1958. The 1985 merger created St. Thomas Aquinas-Mercy High School, which continued operations on the Aquinas campus.

Rosary High School opened in 1961 in Spanish Lake, guided by the School Sisters of Notre Dame. Dedicated to Mary, Our Lady of the Rosary, it educated students for over four decades. In 2002, the Archdiocese decided to consolidate St. Thomas Aquinas-Mercy and Rosary High School, leading to the closure of both institutions and the establishment of Trinity Catholic High School in fall 2003 on the former Rosary campus.

By February 2021, the total number of students was 284, with 12th graders making up 77 of them.

Trinity Catholic High School closed at the conclusion of the 2020–2021 school year. The archdiocese stated that it would be expensive to repair the building, and that area families chose other Catholic schools, which is why the number of students had declined. Had the school remained open, it would have had an expected 9th grade enrollment of 37 the following year. It was the final high school in St. Louis County that the St. Louis Archdiocese had directly administered.

Former students at the school told Alexander Thompson of the National Catholic Reporter that they felt betrayed by the school's closure.

== Notable alumni ==
- Isaiah Williams (2019), football player for the Cincinnati Bengals
- Ryan Kalkbrenner (2020), basketball player for the Charlotte Hornets
