= Garrett Groshek =

American football player and coach (born 1997)

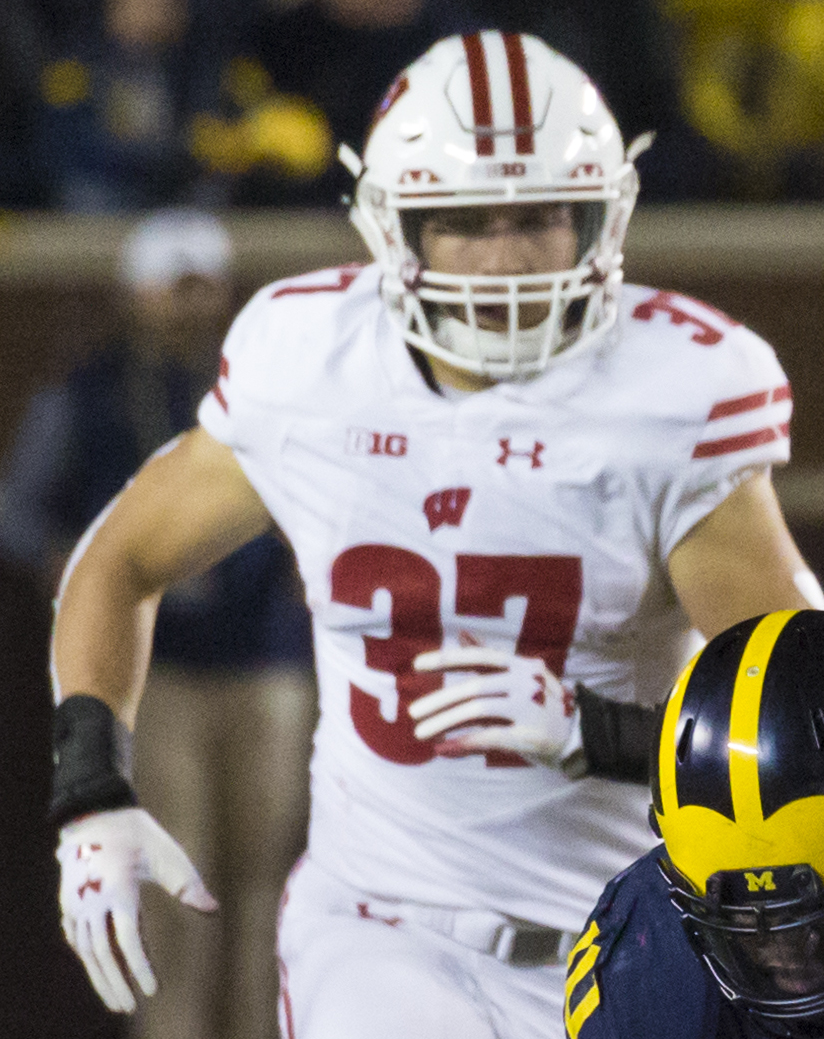
- Groshek with the Wisconsin Badgers in 2018

No. 37
- Position: Running back

Personal information
- Born: August 2, 1997 (age 29); Amherst Junction, Wisconsin, U.S.
- Listed height: 5 ft 11 in (1.80 m)
- Listed weight: 220 lb (100 kg)

Career information
- High school: Amherst (Amherst, Wisconsin)
- College: Wisconsin
- NFL draft: 2021: undrafted

Career history
- Las Vegas Raiders (2021)*; Minnesota Vikings (2021)*; Pittsburgh Maulers (2022–2023)
- * Offseason or practice squad member only

Garrett Groshek (born August 2, 1997) is an American former football running back. He played college football at Wisconsin.

== Professional career ==
=== Las Vegas Raiders ===
Groshek was signed by the Las Vegas Raiders after going undrafted on May 7, 2021. He was waived on August 31, 2021.

=== Minnesota Vikings ===
On November 16, 2021, the Minnesota Vikings signed Groshek to the practice squad. On November 23, 2021, he was released from the practice squad.

=== Pittsburgh Maulers ===
Groshek was selected in the 27th round of the 2022 USFL draft by the Pittsburgh Maulers. Groshek finished the 2023 season with 209 rushing yards and 1 touchdown, adding 6 catches for 48 yards. In the 2023 USFL Championship Game, Groshek had 9 carries for 35 yards and 2 catches for 13 yards. He became a free agent after the 2023 season. Groshek's statistics over two seasons in the USFL were 185 rushes for 538 yards and two touchdowns, plus 14 receptions for 92 yards.

== Coaching career ==
Groshek spent 2021 as the running backs coach for Brevard College in North Carolina. The Brevard Tornados Division III season began several days after Groshek's release from the Raiders, and concluded several days prior to his signing with the Vikings. Following his release from the Vikings, Groshek was hired as a temporary coach for his alma mater, due to illness. Groshek served as the Badger's running backs coach during their Las Vegas Bowl win at the request of his former head coach Paul Chryst. When Coach Gary Brown died from cancer later the next year, Groshek paid tribute to the veteran position coach he had filled in for.

While playing in the USFL in the spring months in 2022 and 2023, Groshek then returned to Brevard as an offensive analyst position on the coaching staff both years. Brevard's head coach Bill Khayat was also an assistant coach for Pittsburgh during both USFL seasons.

In late 2024, after having spent the year away from football both as a player and as a coach, Groshek applied for the vacant offensive coordinator job at his alma mater under coach Luke Fickell.
