= Brad Salem =

American football coach (born 1970)

Current position
- Title: Tight ends coach
- Team: Memphis
- Conference: AAC

Biographical details
- Born: March 18, 1970 (age 56); Sioux Falls, South Dakota, U.S.
- Education: Augustana University; Michigan State University

Playing career
- 1988–1989: Northern Arizona
- 1990–1992: Augustana (SD)
- 1993: Robinson Sphinx
- Positions: Quarterback, wide receiver

Coaching career (HC unless noted)
- 1993: Robinson Sphinx (OC)
- 1993: Augustana (SD) (assistant DB)
- 1994–1995: Michigan State (GA)
- 1996: Everett HS (MI) (DC)
- 1997–1998: Luther (OC/RC)
- 1999–2001: South Dakota (PGC/RC)
- 2002: O'Gorman HS (SD) (QB)
- 2003: Augustana (SD) (QB)
- 2004: Augustana (SD) (OC)
- 2005–2009: Augustana (SD)
- 2010: Michigan State (RB)
- 2011–2012: Michigan State (RB/RC)
- 2013–2016: Michigan State (QB/RC)
- 2017–2018: Michigan State (QB)
- 2019: Michigan State (OC/RB)
- 2020: Memphis (sr. off. consultant)
- 2021–present: Memphis (TE)

Head coaching record
- Overall: 31–26
- Bowls: 1–1

Brad Salem (born March 18, 1970) is an American college football coach and former player. He is the tight ends coach for the University of Memphis, a position he has held since 2021. He has previously been an assistant coach at Luther, South Dakota, his alma mater Augustana University, and Michigan State.

== Playing career ==
Brad and his twin brother Brent were born in Vermillion, South Dakota. His father, Joe Salem, was then the head football coach at the University of South Dakota. After the 1974 season, Joe accepted the heading coaching job at Northern Arizona University in Flagstaff, Arizona. Joe stayed there for four years before returning to the Midwest in 1979 as the head coach at the University of Minnesota in Minneapolis–Saint Paul. He resigned during the 1983 season and returned to his native Sioux Falls, South Dakota, where he went into private business.

Salem played high school football at O'Gorman High School in Sioux Falls, where he played quarterback and won a state championship. He started his college career at Northern Arizona, where his father was the head coach from 1975 to 1978. After two seasons playing at Northern Arizona, he transferred to Division–II Augustana University in Sioux Falls, where he played both quarterback and wide receiver. After his college career, Salem then signed with the Robinson Sphinx club in France Championnat Élite Division 1.

== Coaching career ==
In 1993, Salem signed to play in France and also began his coaching career with the Robinson Sphinx, a football team from Paris. That fall, Salem returned to Augustana to coach as a student assistant. From 1994 to 1995, Salem served as a graduate assistant at Michigan State working with the wide receivers and quarterbacks under head coaches George Perles and Nick Saban. He became a high school coach in 1996, serving as the defensive coordinator for Everett High School in Lansing, Michigan. He returned to the college game in 1997, serving as the offensive and recruiting coordinator at Luther College in Decorah, Iowa. After two seasons at Luther, South Dakota hired Salem to be their passing game and recruiting coordinator. He and his brother Brent resigned from South Dakota on December 31, 2001. For the 2002 season, Salem returned to coaching high school football and became the quarterbacks coach at the high school where he played, O'Gorman High School.

=== Augustana (South Dakota) ===
Salem returned to both the college game and Augustana in 2003, becoming the quarterbacks coach at his alma mater. Following the 2003 season, he was promoted to offensive coordinator.

On December 3, 2004, Salem was named the 20th coach in Augustana's football history, succeeding longtime head coach Jim Heinitz. In five seasons as Augustana's head coach, Salem posted a record of 31–26, with the team's best seasons coming in 2008 and 2009 at an 8–4 record in each season. He resigned from Augustana on February 19, 2010.

=== Michigan State ===
On February 19, 2010, Salem accepted the running backs coach position at Michigan State under head coach Mark Dantonio. During his time as running backs coach, running back Le'Veon Bell rushed for 1,793 yards and 12 touchdowns in 2012. He was shuffled to quarterbacks coach before the 2013 season. Under Salem, quarterback Connor Cook led a three–year stretch from 2013 to 2015 where he passed for a combined 9,100 yards and 70 touchdowns as the team went 36–5 in Cook's starts. Prior to the 2019 season, Salem was promoted to offensive coordinator and moved back to running backs coach. The offense was hampered by injuries in 2019, but was able to make improvements in total offense, scoring, and third down conversions from the previous season. Following Dantonio's retirement, Salem was not retained by new head coach Mel Tucker.

=== Memphis ===
After one season as a senior offensive consultant for Memphis, Salem was promoted to tight ends coach on April 13, 2021.

== Head coaching record ==
Year	Team	Overall	Conference	Standing	Bowl/playoffs
Augustana (South Dakota) Vikings (North Central Conference) (2005–2007)
2005	Augustana	6–5	2–4	6th	
2006	Augustana	5–6	3–5	T–5th	
2007	Augustana	4–7	2–6	7th	
Augustana (South Dakota) Vikings (Northern Sun Intercollegiate Conference) (2008–2009)
2008	Augustana	8–4	7–3	3rd (South)	W Mineral Water
2009	Augustana	8–4	7–3	T–2nd (South)	L Mineral Water
Augustana:		31–26	21–21		
Total:		31–26			
^{†}Indicates Bowl Coalition, Bowl Alliance, BCS, or CFP / New Years' Six bowl.
