= Isaiah Williams (wide receiver, born 2001) =

American football player (born 2001)

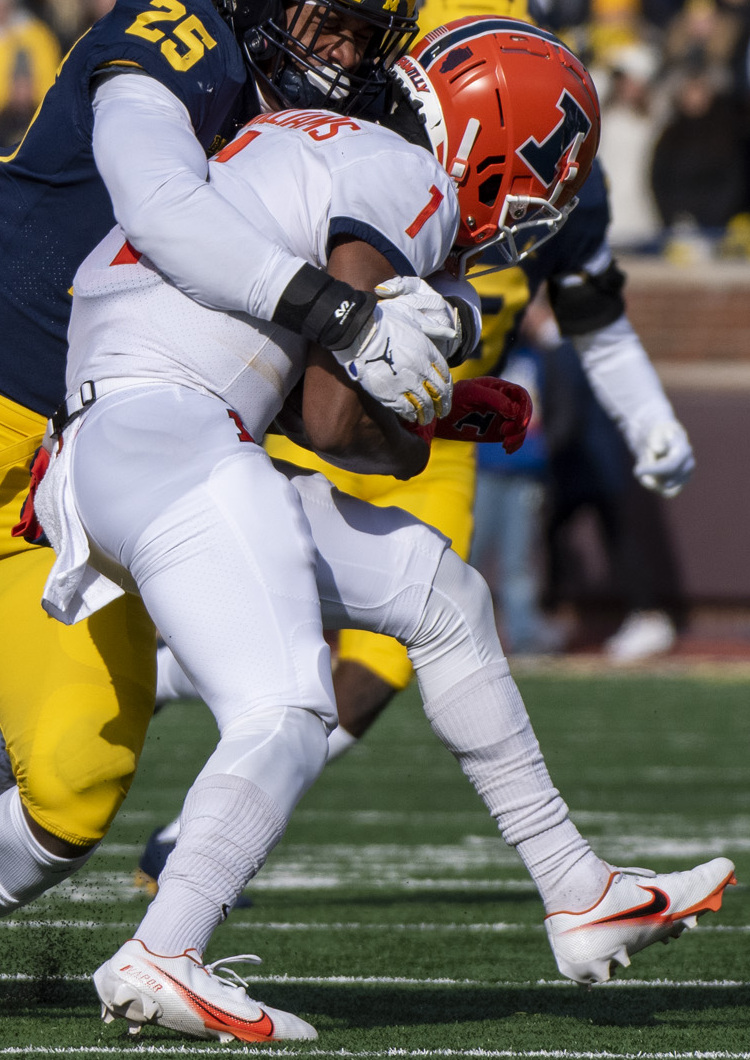
- Williams with Illinois in 2022

No. 18 – New York Jets
- Positions: Wide receiver, return specialist
- Roster status: Active

Personal information
- Born: January 29, 2001 (age 25); St. Louis, Missouri, U.S.
- Listed height: 5 ft 10 in (1.78 m)
- Listed weight: 185 lb (84 kg)

Career information
- High school: Trinity Catholic (St. Louis)
- College: Illinois (2019–2023)
- NFL draft: 2024: undrafted

Career history
- Detroit Lions (2024); Cincinnati Bengals (2024–2025); New York Jets (2025–present)

Awards and highlights
- Jets Curtis Martin Team MVP (2025); First-team All-Big Ten (2023)

Career NFL statistics as of Week 7, 2026
- Receptions: 39
- Receiving yards: 350
- Receiving touchdowns: 1
- Rushing yards: 55
- Return yards: 1,877
- Return touchdowns: 2
- Stats at Pro Football Reference

Isaiah Williams (born January 29, 2001) is an American professional football wide receiver and return specialist for the New York Jets of the National Football League (NFL). He played college football for the Illinois Fighting Illini, where he was a first-team All-Big Ten selection.

== Early life ==
Williams attended Trinity Catholic High School in St. Louis, Missouri. He played quarterback in high school. Williams was the Missouri Gatorade Football Player of the Year both his junior and senior seasons. He played in the 2019 Under Armour All-America Game. He committed to the University of Illinois Urbana-Champaign to play college football.

== College career ==
Williams played quarterback his first two years at Illinois in 2019 and 2020. He played in four games his first season and took a redshirt. As a redshirt freshman in 2020, he started four games and played in one other. In his first career start, he rushed for 192 yards, which was a school record for quarterbacks. Overall for the season, he completed 26 of 63 passes for 393 yards with four touchdowns and two interceptions and rushed for 389 yards with a touchdown.

Prior to the 2021 season, Williams was switched to wide receiver. In his first year as a receiver, he led the team with 47 receptions for 525 yards and four touchdowns. He started all 13 games in 2022 and again led the team with 82 receptions for 715 yards and five touchdowns.

== Professional career ==
Pre-draft measurables
Height	Weight	Arm length	Hand span	Wingspan	40-yard dash	10-yard split	20-yard split	20-yard shuttle	Three-cone drill	Vertical jump	Broad jump	Bench press
5 ft 9 1/4 in (1.76 m)	182 lb (83 kg)	30 1/8 in (0.77 m)	9 1/8 in (0.23 m)	6 ft 0 3/4 in (1.85 m)	4.57 s	1.56 s	2.62 s	4.11 s	6.75 s	38.0 in (0.97 m)	10 ft 8 in (3.25 m)	17 reps
All values from NFL Combine/Pro Day

=== Detroit Lions ===
On April 28, 2024, Williams signed with the Detroit Lions as an undrafted free agent, after not being selected in the 2024 NFL draft. He was notably among the 53 players to make the Lions initial Week 1 roster. However, he was released by the team on November 7.

=== Cincinnati Bengals ===
On November 8, 2024, Williams was claimed off waivers by the Cincinnati Bengals. Starting with the Bengals' Week 14 game against the Dallas Cowboys, Williams took over punt return duties for the Bengals after an injury to Charlie Jones. He remained in the role for the rest of the season.

On August 26, 2025, Williams was waived by the Bengals as part of final roster cuts and re-signed to the practice squad the next day.

=== New York Jets ===
On September 10, 2025, Williams was signed by the New York Jets off the Bengals' practice squad. He was released on October 4, and re-signed to the practice squad. Williams was promoted to the active roster on October 18. In Week 8, Williams returned five kicks for 132 yards and three punts for 38 yards in a 39-38 win over the Cincinnati Bengals, earning AFC Special Teams Player of the Week. In Week 10 against the Cleveland Browns, Williams returned a punt for a touchdown, one drive after teammate Kene Nwangwu had recorded a kick return touchdown.
