= Mone =

Mone may refer to:

== People ==
=== Mononym ===
- Mone (Burmese actress) (born 1992) Burmese television and film actress

=== Surname ===
- Arbër Mone (born 1988), Albanian footballer
- Bryan Mone (born 1995) American football nose tackle
- Dessie Mone, Irish Gaelic footballer
- Franz Mone (1796–1871), German historian and archaeologist
- Guy Mone (died 1407), English royal administrator and bishop
- Hawise Mone (fl. 1428–1430), English Lollard in Norfolk in the fifteenth century
- Jean Mone (c. 1500 – c. 1548), Brabant sculptor
- John Mone (1929–2016), Scottish bishop
- John Paul Mone, Irish Gaelic footballer
- Michelle Mone, Baroness Mone (born 1971), Scottish businesswoman
- Miriam Mone (1965–2007), Irish fashion designer
- Robert Mone (born 1948), Scottish murderer
- Rory Mone, Irish Gaelic footballer
- Sanjay Mone, Marathi actor, dialogue writer and script writer

=== Given name ===
- Mone Chiba (born 2005), Japanese figure skater
- Moné Hattori (born 1999), Japanese violinist
- Mone Inami (born 1999), Japanese professional golfer
- Mone Kamishiraishi (born 1998), Japanese actress and singer

== Places ==
- Mone, a town in Kyaukkyi Township, Bago, Myanmar
- Mongnai State, a former state in today's Myanmar

== See also ==
- C-Mone, English rapper
- Moné, American singer-songwriter
- Mone Mone, Bengali romance drama film
- Mones (disambiguation)
