= 2018 Michigan Wolverines football team =

American college football season

2018 Michigan Wolverines football

Big Ten East Division co-champion

Peach Bowl, L 15–41 vs. Florida
- Conference: Big Ten Conference
- East Division

Ranking
- Coaches: No. 14
- AP: No. 14
- Record: 10–3 (8–1 Big Ten)
- Head coach: Jim Harbaugh (4th season)
- Offensive scheme: Multiple
- Defensive coordinator: Don Brown (3rd season)
- Base defense: 4–3
- MVP: Chase Winovich
- Captains: Ben Bredeson; Devin Bush Jr.; Karan Higdon; Tyree Kinnel
- Home stadium: Michigan Stadium

Uniform
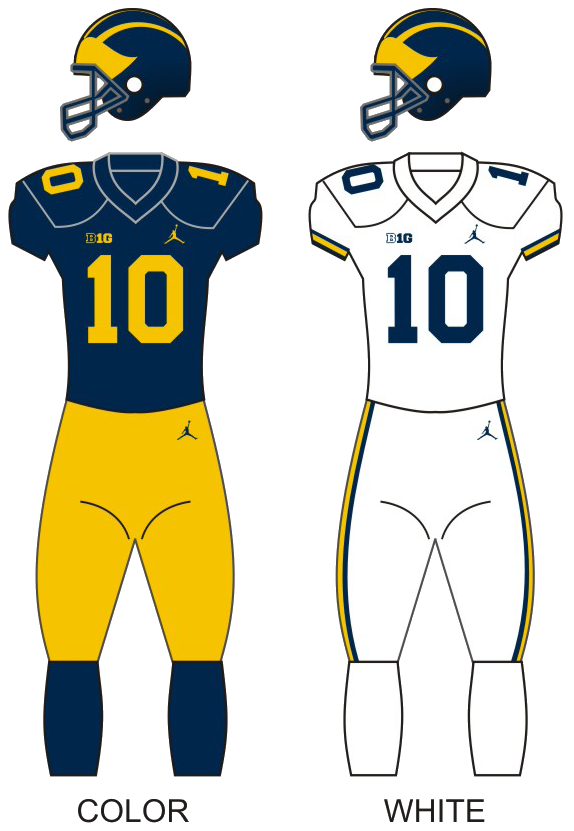

2018 Big Ten Conference football standings
| | Conf. | | | Overall |
| Team | W | | L | W | | L |
|---|---|---|---|---|---|---|
East Division
| No. 3 Ohio State xy$ | 8 | – | 1 | 13 | – | 1 |
| No. 14 Michigan x | 8 | – | 1 | 10 | – | 3 |
| No. 17 Penn State | 6 | – | 3 | 9 | – | 4 |
| Michigan State | 5 | – | 4 | 7 | – | 6 |
| Maryland | 3 | – | 6 | 5 | – | 7 |
| Indiana | 2 | – | 7 | 5 | – | 7 |
| Rutgers | 0 | – | 9 | 1 | – | 11 |
West Division
| No. 21 Northwestern xy | 8 | – | 1 | 9 | – | 5 |
| Wisconsin | 5 | – | 4 | 8 | – | 5 |
| No. 25 Iowa | 5 | – | 4 | 9 | – | 4 |
| Purdue | 5 | – | 4 | 6 | – | 7 |
| Minnesota | 3 | – | 6 | 7 | – | 6 |
| Nebraska | 3 | – | 6 | 4 | – | 8 |
| Illinois | 2 | – | 7 | 4 | – | 8 |
Championship: Ohio State 45, Northwestern 24
$ – Conference champion; x – Division champion/co-champions; y – Championship game participant; Rankings from AP Poll

The 2018 Michigan Wolverines football team represented the University of Michigan in the sport of college football during the 2018 NCAA Division I FBS football season. The Wolverines were members of the East Division of the Big Ten Conference and played their home games at Michigan Stadium in Ann Arbor, Michigan. Michigan was coached by Jim Harbaugh, who was in his fourth season as head coach of his alma mater.

Michigan began the year ranked 14th in both the AP Poll and Coaches Poll. Its first game of the year was on the road against rival Notre Dame, the first meeting between the two schools since 2014. The Wolverines lost that game, 24–17. Michigan won its next ten games, however, including wins over then-ranked Big Ten opponents Michigan State, Wisconsin, and Penn State, all of whom beat Michigan the previous year. The team rallied around calling the season a "revenge tour". The Wolverines climbed to fourth in the College Football Playoff rankings, and would have clinched the Big Ten Eastern Division and a spot in the 2018 Big Ten Football Championship Game with a regular-season-ending win over arch-rival Ohio State. However, the revenge tour came to an abrupt end as Michigan lost, 62–39, its seventh consecutive loss to the Buckeyes and 14th loss in 15 years in the series. The Wolverines were selected to their second New Year's Six bowl in three years, the Peach Bowl, where they lost to Florida, 41–15. The team's final record was 10–3, Harbaugh's third ten-win season in four years, and the team finished exactly where it started in the polls, at 14th.

Michigan was led on offense by junior quarterback Shea Patterson, a transfer from Ole Miss, and running back Karan Higdon, who became the first Michigan running back to rush for 1,000 yards since Fitzgerald Toussaint in 2011. On defense, the Wolverines were led by linebacker Devin Bush Jr., who was a consensus All-American and won the Nagurski–Woodson Award as the Big Ten's defensive player of the year. Five Michigan defensive players were named first-team All-Big Ten by the coaches: Bush, defensive linemen Rashan Gary and Chase Winovich, and defensive backs Lavert Hill and David Long.

== Preseason ==
In January 2018, the Wolverines hired Ben Herbert as Director of strength and conditioning, and Sherrone Moore as tight ends coach. On February 20, 2018, the Wolverines hired Jim McElwain as wide receivers coach. On February 23, Tim Drevno resigned as offensive coordinator after three seasons. The offensive coordinator position remained vacant throughout the 2018 season, with play calling duties split among the offensive coaches in what coach Harbaugh described as a "collaborative effort", with passing game coordinator Pep Hamilton calling a majority of the plays.

=== Award watch lists ===
Listed in the order that they were released

| Award | Player | Position | Year |
|---|---|---|---|
| Lott Trophy | Khaleke Hudson | LB | JR |
| Chuck Bednarik Award | Chase Winovich | DE | SR |
| Chuck Bednarik Award | Rashan Gary | DE | JR |
| Chuck Bednarik Award | Devin Bush | LB | JR |
| Maxwell Award | Shea Patterson | QB | JR |
| Maxwell Award | Karan Higdon | RB | SR |
| Doak Walker Award | Karan Higdon | RB | SR |
| John Mackey Award | Zach Gentry | TE | JR |
| John Mackey Award | Sean McKeon | TE | JR |
| Butkus Award | Devin Bush | LB | JR |
| Jim Thorpe Award | Lavert Hill | DB | JR |
| Bronko Nagurski Trophy | Devin Bush | LB | JR |
| Bronko Nagurski Trophy | Rashan Gary | DE | JR |
| Bronko Nagurski Trophy | Lavert Hill | DB | JR |
| Bronko Nagurski Trophy | Khaleke Hudson | LB | JR |
| Bronko Nagurski Trophy | Chase Winovich | DE | SR |
| Outland Trophy | Ben Bredeson | G | JR |
| Lou Groza Award | Quinn Nordin | K | JR |
| Paul Hornung Award | Donovan Peoples-Jones | WR/KR | SO |
| Walter Camp Award | Devin Bush | LB | JR |
| Walter Camp Award | Rashan Gary | DE | JR |
| Ted Hendricks Award | Rashan Gary | DE | JR |
| Ted Hendricks Award | Chase Winovich | DE | SR |
| Johnny Unitas Golden Arm Award | Shea Patterson | QB | JR |

== Recruiting ==
=== Recruits ===
Michigan's recruiting class consisted of 19 recruits, including three that enrolled early. Michigan's recruiting class was ranked No. 20 by ESPN, No. 24 by Rivals.com, and No. 21 by 247Sports.com's Composite Rankings.

College recruiting (2018)
| Name | Hometown | School | Height | Weight | Commit date |
|---|---|---|---|---|---|
| Aidan Hutchinson; DE | Dearborn, Michigan | Divine Child High School | 6 ft 6 in (1.98 m) | 260 lb (120 kg) | Feb 21, 2017 |
| Aidan Hutchinson; DE | Recruit ratings: Scout: Rivals: 247Sports: ESPN: | | | | |
| Myles Sims; CB | Atlanta, Georgia | Westlake High School | 6 ft 3 in (1.91 m) | 173 lb (78 kg) | Apr 7, 2017 |
| Myles Sims; CB | Recruit ratings: Scout: Rivals: 247Sports: ESPN: | | | | |
| Christian Turner; RB | Buford, Georgia | Buford High School | 5 ft 11 in (1.80 m) | 187 lb (85 kg) | Apr 10, 2017 |
| Christian Turner; RB | Recruit ratings: Scout: Rivals: 247Sports: ESPN: | | | | |
| German Green; S | DeSoto, Texas | DeSoto High School | 6 ft 2 in (1.88 m) | 168 lb (76 kg) | Apr 20, 2017 |
| German Green; S | Recruit ratings: Scout: Rivals: 247Sports: ESPN: | | | | |
| Gemon Green; CB | DeSoto, Texas | DeSoto High School | 6 ft 2 in (1.88 m) | 165 lb (75 kg) | Apr 20, 2017 |
| Gemon Green; CB | Recruit ratings: Scout: Rivals: 247Sports: ESPN: | | | | |
| Joe Milton; QB | Orlando, Florida | Olympia High School | 6 ft 5 in (1.96 m) | 210 lb (95 kg) | May 7, 2017 |
| Joe Milton; QB | Recruit ratings: Scout: Rivals: 247Sports: ESPN: | | | | |
| Jalen Mayfield; OT | Lansing, Michigan | Catholic Central High School | 6 ft 5 in (1.96 m) | 273 lb (124 kg) | May 23, 2017 |
| Jalen Mayfield; OT | Recruit ratings: Scout: Rivals: 247Sports: ESPN: | | | | |
| Ryan Hayes; OT | Traverse City, Michigan | Traverse City West High School | 6 ft 7 in (2.01 m) | 252 lb (114 kg) | May 27, 2017 |
| Ryan Hayes; OT | Recruit ratings: Scout: Rivals: 247Sports: ESPN: | | | | |
| Luke Schoonmaker; TE | Hamden, Connecticut | Hamden Hall Country Day School | 6 ft 6 in (1.98 m) | 225 lb (102 kg) | Jul 25, 2017 |
| Luke Schoonmaker; TE | Recruit ratings: Scout: Rivals: 247Sports: ESPN: | | | | |
| Cameron McGrone; LB | Indianapolis, Indiana | Lawrence Central High School | 6 ft 1 in (1.85 m) | 215 lb (98 kg) | Jul 31, 2017 |
| Cameron McGrone; LB | Recruit ratings: Scout: Rivals: 247Sports: ESPN: | | | | |
| Sammy Faustin; CB | Naples, Florida | Naples High School | 6 ft 2 in (1.88 m) | 190 lb (86 kg) | Aug 2, 2017 |
| Sammy Faustin; CB | Recruit ratings: Scout: Rivals: 247Sports: ESPN: | | | | |
| Mustapha Muhammad; TE | Missouri City, Texas | Ridge Point High School | 6 ft 4 in (1.93 m) | 235 lb (107 kg) | Oct 20, 2017 |
| Mustapha Muhammad; TE | Recruit ratings: Scout: Rivals: 247Sports: ESPN: | | | | |
| Hassan Haskins; RB | Eureka, Missouri | Eureka High School | 6 ft 1 in (1.85 m) | 202 lb (92 kg) | Oct 29, 2017 |
| Hassan Haskins; RB | Recruit ratings: Scout: Rivals: 247Sports: ESPN: | | | | |
| Taylor Upshaw; DE | Bradenton, Florida | Braden River High School | 6 ft 5 in (1.96 m) | 240 lb (110 kg) | Nov 24, 2017 |
| Taylor Upshaw; DE | Recruit ratings: Scout: Rivals: 247Sports: ESPN: | | | | |
| Ben VanSumeren; FB | Essexville, Michigan | Garber High School | 6 ft 3 in (1.91 m) | 228 lb (103 kg) | Dec 17, 2017 |
| Ben VanSumeren; FB | Recruit ratings: Scout: Rivals: 247Sports: ESPN: | | | | |
| Ronnie Bell; WR | Kansas City, Missouri | Park Hill High School | 6 ft 1 in (1.85 m) | 170 lb (77 kg) | Dec 18, 2017 |
| Ronnie Bell; WR | Recruit ratings: Scout: Rivals: 247Sports: ESPN: | | | | |
| Julius Welschof; DE | Munich, Germany | N/A | 6 ft 6 in (1.98 m) | 248 lb (112 kg) | Dec 20, 2017 |
| Julius Welschof; DE | Recruit ratings: Scout: Rivals: 247Sports: ESPN: | | | | |
| Vincent Gray; CB | Rochester Hills, Michigan | Adams High School | 6 ft 2 in (1.88 m) | 180 lb (82 kg) | Jan 21, 2018 |
| Vincent Gray; CB | Recruit ratings: Scout: Rivals: 247Sports: ESPN: | | | | |
| Michael Barrett; QB | Valdosta, Georgia | Lowndes High School | 6 ft 0 in (1.83 m) | 200 lb (91 kg) | Jan 23, 2018 |
| Michael Barrett; QB | Recruit ratings: Scout: Rivals: 247Sports: ESPN: | | | | |
Overall recruit ranking: Rivals: 24 247Sports: 21 ESPN: 20
Note: In many cases, Scout, Rivals, 247Sports, On3, and ESPN may conflict in their listings of height and weight.; In these cases, the average was taken. ESPN grades are on a 100-point scale.; Sources: "Michigan Football Commitments". Rivals.; "ESPN". ESPN.; "2018 Team Ranking". Rivals.com.

== Schedule ==
| Date | Time | Opponent | Rank | Site | TV | Result | Attendance |
|---|---|---|---|---|---|---|---|
| September 1 | 7:30 p.m. | at No. 12 Notre Dame* | No. 14 | Notre Dame Stadium; Notre Dame, IN (rivalry, College GameDay) | NBC | L 17–24 | 77,622 |
| September 8 | 12:00 p.m. | Western Michigan* | No. 21 | Michigan Stadium; Ann Arbor, MI | FS1 | W 49–3 | 110,814 |
| September 15 | 3:30 p.m. | SMU* | No. 19 | Michigan Stadium; Ann Arbor, MI | BTN | W 45–20 | 110,549 |
| September 22 | 12:00 p.m. | Nebraska | No. 19 | Michigan Stadium; Ann Arbor, MI | FS1 | W 56–10 | 111,037 |
| September 29 | 4:30 p.m. | at Northwestern | No. 14 | Ryan Field; Evanston, IL (rivalry) | FOX | W 20–17 | 47,330 |
| October 6 | 12:00 p.m. | Maryland^{†} | No. 15 | Michigan Stadium; Ann Arbor, MI | ABC | W 42–21 | 109,531 |
| October 13 | 7:30 p.m. | No. 15 Wisconsin | No. 12 | Michigan Stadium; Ann Arbor, MI (College GameDay) | ABC | W 38–13 | 111,360 |
| October 20 | 12:00 p.m. | at No. 24 Michigan State | No. 6 | Spartan Stadium; East Lansing, MI (rivalry) | FOX | W 21–7 | 76,131 |
| November 3 | 3:45 p.m. | No. 14 Penn State | No. 5 | Michigan Stadium; Ann Arbor, MI (rivalry) | ESPN | W 42–7 | 111,747 |
| November 10 | 3:30 p.m. | at Rutgers | No. 4 | HighPoint.com Stadium; Piscataway, NJ | BTN | W 42–7 | 43,786 |
| November 17 | 4:00 p.m. | Indiana | No. 4 | Michigan Stadium; Ann Arbor, MI | FS1 | W 31–20 | 110,118 |
| November 24 | 12:00 p.m. | at No. 10 Ohio State | No. 4 | Ohio Stadium; Columbus, OH (The Game, College GameDay) | FOX | L 39–62 | 106,588 |
| December 29 | 12:00 p.m. | vs. No. 10 Florida* | No. 7 | Mercedes-Benz Stadium; Atlanta, GA (Peach Bowl) | ESPN | L 15–41 | 74,006 |
*Non-conference game; ^{†}Homecoming; Rankings from AP Poll and CFP Rankings after October 30 released prior to game; All times are in Eastern time

== Rankings ==
Ranking movements Legend: ██ Increase in ranking ██ Decrease in ranking т = Tied with team above or below
| | Week | | | | | | | | | | | | | | | |
| Poll | Pre | 1 | 2 | 3 | 4 | 5 | 6 | 7 | 8 | 9 | 10 | 11 | 12 | 13 | 14 | Final |
|---|---|---|---|---|---|---|---|---|---|---|---|---|---|---|---|---|
| AP | 14 | 21 | 19 | 19 | 14 | 15 | 12 | 6 | 5 | 5 | 4 | 4 | 4 | 8 | 8 | 14 |
| Coaches | 14 | 22 | 22 | 21 | 15 | 16 | 13 | 7 | 5 | 5–T | 4 | 4 | 4 | 8 | 8 | 14 |
| CFP | Not released | | | | | | | | | 5 | 4 | 4 | 4 | 7 | 7 | Not released |

== Game summaries ==
=== At Notre Dame ===
Michigan at Notre Dame
(College GameDay/Michigan–Notre Dame rivalry)

| Team | 1 | 2 | 3 | 4 | Total |
|---|---|---|---|---|---|
| No. 14 Wolverines | 0 | 10 | 0 | 7 | 17 |
| • No. 12 Fighting Irish | 14 | 7 | 3 | 0 | 24 |

- Date: September 1
- Location: Notre Dame Stadium
  South Bend, IN
- Game start: 7:43 pm EDT
- Elapsed time: 3:22
- Game attendance: 80,795
- Game weather: 83º F, Slight clouds, SSW 6 MPH
- Referee: Jeff Flanagan
- TV announcers (NBC): Mike Tirico (play-by-play), Doug Flutie (analyst), Kathryn Tappen (sideline)

Scoring summary
| 1 | 13:35 | ND | Jafar Armstrong 13-yard run (Justin Yoon kick) | ND 7–0 |
| 1 | 7:09 | ND | Chris Finke 43-yard pass from Brandon Wimbush (Justin Yoon kick) | ND 14–0 |
| 2 | 11:32 | MICH | Quinn Nordin 55-yard field goal | ND 14–3 |
| 2 | 3:55 | ND | Jafar Armstrong 13-yard run (Justin Yoon kick) | ND 21–3 |
| 2 | 3:41 | MICH | Ambry Thomas 99-yard kickoff return | ND 21–10 |
| 3 | 3:07 | ND | Justin Yoon 48-yard field goal | ND 24–10 |
| 4 | 2:18 | MICH | Karan Higdon 3-yard run (Quinn Nordin kick) | ND 24–17 |

To open the season, Michigan travelled to South Bend, Indiana to face the Notre Dame Fighting Irish to resume its long-running rivalry after a three year hiatus.

Michigan lost to Notre Dame, 24–17. Notre Dame scored 14 points in the first quarter on a 13-yard touchdown run from Jafar Armstrong and a 43-yard touchdown pass from Brandon Wimbush to Chris Finke. Michigan responded with 10 points in the second quarter on a 28-yard field goal by Quinn Nordin and a 99-yard kickoff return by Ambry Thomas. Notre Dame extended its lead in the second quarter on a four-yard touchdown run from Armstrong, which made the score 21–10 in favor of Notre Dame at half-time. Notre Dame added a 48-yard field goal by Justin Yoon in the third quarter. Michigan reduced Notre Dame's lead to seven points following a three-yard touchdown run from Karan Higdon in the fourth quarter.

Thomas' 99-yard kickoff return was the third 99-yard kickoff return in program history, and first since Tyrone Wheatley in 1992. Michigan's defense held Notre Dame to only 69 yards on 29 plays and three points in the second half, and scoreless in the fourth quarter.

=== Western Michigan ===
Western Michigan at Michigan

| Team | 1 | 2 | 3 | 4 | Total |
|---|---|---|---|---|---|
| Broncos | 0 | 0 | 0 | 3 | 3 |
| • No. 21 Wolverines | 21 | 14 | 7 | 7 | 49 |

- Date: September 8
- Location: Michigan Stadium
  Ann Arbor, MI
- Game start: 12:05 pm EDT
- Elapsed time: 3:12
- Game attendance: 110,814
- Game weather: Low 60s, Cloudy, NE 10–15 MPH
- Referee: Jerry McGinn
- TV announcers (FS1): Justin Kutcher (play-by-play), DeMarco Murray (analyst), Petros Papadakis (analyst)

Scoring summary
| 1 | 7:05 | MICH | Sean McKeon 17-yard pass from Shea Patterson (Quinn Nordin kick) | MICH 7–0 |
| 1 | 4:11 | MICH | Karan Higdon 67-yard run (Quinn Nordin kick) | MICH 14–0 |
| 1 | 0:52 | MICH | Chris Evans 27-yard run (Quinn Nordin kick) | MICH 21–0 |
| 2 | 9:35 | MICH | Chris Evans 2-yard run (Quinn Nordin kick) | MICH 28–0 |
| 2 | 6:55 | MICH | Nico Collins 44-yard pass from Shea Patterson (Quinn Nordin kick) | MICH 35–0 |
| 3 | 6:21 | MICH | Donovan Peoples-Jones 5-yard pass from Shea Patterson (Quinn Nordin kick) | MICH 42–0 |
| 4 | 8:51 | MICH | Jake McCurry 18-yard pass from Dylan McCaffrey (Quinn Nordin kick) | MICH 49–0 |
| 4 | 2:34 | WMU | Josh Grant 35-field goal | MICH 49–3 |

Following its opening game against Notre Dame, Michigan hosted the Western Michigan Broncos to open its home schedule. This was the first meeting between the schools since 2011, a game shortened by lightning.

Michigan won in a blowout, 49–3. Michigan scored 21 points in the first quarter on a 17-yard touchdown pass from Shea Patterson to Sean McKeon, a 67-yard touchdown run from Karan Higdon and a 27-yard touchdown run from Chris Evans. Michigan added 14 points in the second quarter on a two-yard touchdown run from Evans, and a 44-yard touchdown pass from Patterson to Nico Collins, which made the score 35–0 in favor of Michigan at half-time. Michigan extended its lead in the third quarter on a five-yard touchdown pass from Patterson to Donovan Peoples-Jones. Michigan added seven points in the fourth quarter on an 18-yard touchdown pass from Dylan McCaffrey to Jake McCurry. Western Michigan finally got on the board late in the fourth quarter with a 35-yard field goal by Josh Grant to avoid a shutout.

Michigan's honorary captains for the game were alumni Grant Newsome and Brenda Tracy. Michigan scored 21 points in the first quarter for the first time since 2016 against Illinois. Higdon's 140 rushing yards in the first quarter were the most by a Wolverine in a single quarter since Denard Robinson ran for 152 yards in the first quarter against Notre Dame in 2010. Michigan's defense held its opponent to single-digit points for the first time since allowing just a field goal to Maryland in 2016.

=== SMU ===
SMU at Michigan

| Team | 1 | 2 | 3 | 4 | Total |
|---|---|---|---|---|---|
| Mustangs | 0 | 7 | 6 | 7 | 20 |
| • No. 19 Wolverines | 0 | 21 | 14 | 10 | 45 |

- Date: September 15
- Location: Michigan Stadium
  Ann Arbor, MI
- Game start: 3:45 pm EDT
- Elapsed time: 3:24
- Game attendance: 110,549
- Game weather: Mid 80s, Partly cloudy, NE 3–5 MPH
- Referee: Larry Smith
- TV announcers (BTN): Kevin Kugler (play-by-play) Matt Millen (analyst)

Scoring summary
| 2 | 6:56 | MICH | Ben Mason 1-yard run (Quinn Nordin kick) | MICH 7–0 |
| 2 | 5:16 | SMU | James Proche 50-yard pass from Ben Hicks (Will Moore kick) | Tied 7–7 |
| 2 | 2:34 | MICH | Donovan Peoples-Jones 35-yard pass from Shea Patterson (Quinn Nordin kick) | MICH 14–7 |
| 2 | 0:00 | MICH | Josh Metellus 73-yard interception return (Quinn Nordin kick) | MICH 21–0 |
| 3 | 9:07 | MICH | Donovan Peoples-Jones 7-yard pass from Shea Patterson (Quinn Nordin kick) | MICH 28–7 |
| 3 | 1:36 | SMU | Ryan Becker 2-yard pass from William Brown (Will Moore kick failed) | MICH 28–13 |
| 3 | 1:23 | MICH | Donovan Peoples-Jones 41-yard pass from Shea Patterson (Quinn Nordin kick) | MICH 35–13 |
| 4 | 10:43 | SMU | James Proche 2-yard pass from William Brown (Kevin Robledo kick) | MICH 35–20 |
| 4 | 8:03 | MICH | Quinn Nordin 45-yard field goal | MICH 38–20 |
| 4 | 1:05 | MICH | Tru Wilson 9-yard run (Quinn Nordin kick) | MICH 45–20 |

After playing Western Michigan, Michigan hosted the SMU Mustangs.

Michigan defeated SMU 45–20. After neither team scored in the first quarter, Michigan scored on every offensive possession from the second quarter onward. The teams exchanged touchdowns on a one-yard touchdown run from Ben Mason for Michigan, and a 50-yard touchdown pass from Ben Hicks to James Proche for SMU to tie the game. Michigan responded with 14 points on a 35-yard touchdown pass from Shea Patterson to Donovan Peoples-Jones, and a 73-yard interception return from Josh Metellus as time expired in the first half, which made the score 21–7 in favor of Michigan at half-time. Michigan added 14 points in the third quarter on two touchdown receptions from Peoples-Jones, from seven-yards and 41-yards, respectively. SMU responded with a two-yard touchdown pass from William Brown to Ryan Becker. SMU opened the scoring in the fourth quarter on a two-yard touchdown pass from Brown to Proche. Michigan extended its lead with a 45-yard field goal by Quinn Nordin and a nine-yard touchdown run from Tru Wilson.

Peoples-Jones' three touchdowns were the most scored by a Wolverine wide receiver since Jehu Chesson scored four against Indiana in 2015. Metellus' 73-yard interception return was the sixth-longest interception return for a touchdown in program history and the longest since Brandon Herron's school-record 94-yard return against Western Michigan in 2011.

=== Nebraska ===
Nebraska at Michigan

| Team | 1 | 2 | 3 | 4 | Total |
|---|---|---|---|---|---|
| Cornhuskers | 0 | 0 | 3 | 7 | 10 |
| • No. 19 Wolverines | 20 | 19 | 10 | 7 | 56 |

- Date: September 22
- Location: Michigan Stadium
  Ann Arbor, MI
- Game start: 12:05 pm EDT
- Elapsed time: 3:30
- Game attendance: 111,037
- Game weather: Mid 60s, Partly cloudy, NE 5–10 MPH
- Referee: John O'Neill
- TV announcers (FS1): Tim Brando (play-by-play), Spencer Tillman (analyst)

Scoring summary
| 1 | 10:27 | MICH | Ben Mason 1-yard run (Quinn Nordin kick) | MICH 7–0 |
| 1 | 8:58 | MICH | Karan Higdon 44-yard run (Quinn Nordin kick) | MICH 14–0 |
| 1 | 3:09 | MICH | Ben Mason 4-yard run (Quinn Nordin kick failed) | MICH 20–0 |
| 2 | 14:11 | MICH | Quinn Nordin 50-yard field goal | MICH 23–0 |
| 2 | 0:00 | MICH | Zach Gentry 5-yard pass from Shea Patterson (Quinn Nordin kick) | MICH 30–0 |
| 2 | 5:25 | MICH | Ben Mason 1-yard run (Quinn Nordin kick) | MICH 37–0 |
| 2 | 4:03 | MICH | Team 0-yard safety | MICH 39–0 |
| 3 | 9:01 | MICH | Donovan Peoples-Jones 60-yard punt return (Quinn Nordin kick) | MICH 46–0 |
| 3 | 5:23 | NEB | Barret Pickering 35-yard field goal | MICH 46–3 |
| 3 | 0:58 | MICH | Quinn Nordin 38-yard field goal | MICH 49–3 |
| 4 | 14:21 | MICH | Ronnie Bell 56-yard pass from Dylan McCaffrey | MICH 56–3 |
| 4 | 4:14 | NEB | Wyatt Mazour 3-yard run (Barret Pickering kick) | MICH 56–10 |

Following its game against SMU, Michigan began its conference schedule when it hosted the Nebraska Cornhuskers.

Michigan won in a blowout, 56–10. Michigan scored 20 points in the first quarter on two touchdown runs by Ben Mason, from one and four-yards, respectively, and a 44-yard touchdown run from Karan Higdon. Michigan added 19 points in the second quarter, on a 50-yard field goal by Quinn Nordin, a five-yard touchdown pass from Shea Patterson to Zach Gentry, a one-yard touchdown run from Mason, and a safety for Michigan after an illegal forward pass by Adrian Martinez, which made the score 39–0 in favor of Michigan at half-time. Michigan added 10 points in the third quarter on a 60-yard punt return by Donovan Peoples-Jones and a 38-yard field by Nordin. Nebraska finally got on the board late in the third quarter with a 35-yard field goal by Barret Pickering to avoid a shutout. The teams exchanged touchdowns in the fourth quarter on a 56-yard touchdown pass from Dylan McCaffrey to Ronnie Bell for Michigan, and a three-yard touchdown run from Wyatt Mazour for Nebraska.

The 56 points scored were the fifth most in program history of Big Ten openers and the most since a 58–0 victory over Minnesota in 2011. Michigan's offense tallied over 200 yards rushing (285) and passing (206) for the first time since the 2017 season opener against Florida when the Wolverines had 215 yards rushing and 218 yards receiving. Michigan's defense held Nebraska to -5 yards in the first quarter and -1 yard in the second quarter. The last time the Michigan defense held an opponent to negative rushing yards in a quarter was against Ohio State in 2017. Quinn Nordin made a 50-yard field goal in the second quarter, his third career made field goal of at least 50 yards, tying Bob Bergeron (1984–87) for the second-most 50-yard field goals made in a career at Michigan.

=== At Northwestern ===
Michigan at Northwestern

| Team | 1 | 2 | 3 | 4 | Total |
|---|---|---|---|---|---|
| • No. 14 Wolverines | 0 | 7 | 6 | 7 | 20 |
| Wildcats | 10 | 7 | 0 | 0 | 17 |

- Date: September 29
- Location: Ryan Field
  Evanston, IL
- Game start: 4:47 pm EDT
- Elapsed time: 3:21
- Game attendance: 47,330
- Game weather: 57º F, Cloudy, ESE 9 MPH
- Referee: Mark Kluczynski
- TV announcers (Fox): Gus Johnson (play-by-play), Joel Klatt (analyst), Jenny Taft (sideline)

Scoring summary
| 1 | 10:18 | NW | Clayton Thorson 1-yard run (Charlie Kuhbander kick) | NW 7–0 |
| 1 | 3:58 | NW | Charlie Kuhbander 45-yard field goal | NW 10–0 |
| 2 | 12:56 | NW | John Moten IV 3-yard run (Charlie Kuhbander kick) | NW 17–0 |
| 2 | 9:14 | MICH | Karan Higdon 4-yard run (Quinn Nordin kick) | NW 17–7 |
| 3 | 7:40 | MICH | Quinn Nordin 23-yard field goal | NW 17–10 |
| 3 | 0:00 | MICH | Quinn Nordin 24-yard field goal | NW 17–13 |
| 4 | 4:06 | MICH | Karan Higdon 5-yard run (Quinn Nordin kick) | MICH 20–17 |

After facing Nebraska, Michigan traveled to Evanston, Illinois, to face the Northwestern Wildcats.

Michigan defeated Northwestern 20–17. Northwestern scored ten points in the first quarter, on a one-yard touchdown run from Clayton Thorson and a 45-yard field goal by Charlie Kuhbande. Northwestern extended its lead in the second quarter on a three-yard touchdown run from John Moten IV. Michigan finally got on the board with a four-yard touchdown run from Karan Higdon, which made the score 17–7 in favor of Northwestern at half-time. In the second half, Michigan held Northwestern scoreless while accumulating 13 points. First a pair of field goals by Quinn Nordin from 23-yards and 24-yards, respectively in the third quarter, and a five-yard touchdown run from Higdon in the fourth quarter to give Michigan its first lead of the game, and the eventual win.

Michigan's 17-point comeback victory was its first since rallying for a 17-point comeback against Notre Dame in 2011. Northwestern had 105 total yards of offense in the first quarter, while Michigan's defense held them to just 97 yards in the final three quarters. Michigan's defense had season highs in sacks (six) and tackle-for-loss (10).

=== Maryland ===
Maryland at Michigan
(Homecoming game)

| Team | 1 | 2 | 3 | 4 | Total |
|---|---|---|---|---|---|
| Terrapins | 7 | 0 | 0 | 14 | 21 |
| • No. 15 Wolverines | 3 | 14 | 10 | 15 | 42 |

- Date: October 6
- Location: Michigan Stadium
  Ann Arbor, MI
- Game start: 1:10 pm EDT
- Elapsed time: 3:18
- Game attendance: 109,531
- Game weather: Mid 70s, Cloudy, rain possible, SW 10–15 MPH
- Referee: Mike Cannon
- TV announcers (ABC): Steve Levy (play-by-play), Brian Griese (analyst), Todd McShay (sideline)

Scoring summary
| 1 | 1:21 | MICH | Quinn Nordin 34-yard field goal | MICH 3–0 |
| 1 | 1:10 | MD | Ty Johnson 98-yard kickoff return (Joseph Petrino kick) | MD 7–3 |
| 2 | 8:21 | MICH | Ben Mason 1-yard run (Quinn Nordin kick) | MICH 10–7 |
| 2 | 0:16 | MICH | Ronnie Bell 22-yard pass from Shea Patterson (Quinn Nordin kick) | MICH 17–7 |
| 3 | 7:13 | MICH | Quinn Nordin 31-yard field goal | MICH 20–7 |
| 3 | 2:15 | MICH | Donovan Peoples-Jones 34-yard pass from Shea Patterson (Quinn Nordin kick) | MICH 27–7 |
| 4 | 11:28 | MD | Javon Leake 1-yard run (Joseph Petrino kick) | MICH 27–14 |
| 4 | 6:37 | MICH | Jared Wangler 7-yard pass from Shea Patterson (Ben Mason run) | MICH 35–14 |
| 4 | 4:25 | MICH | Brandon Watson 46-yard interception return (Quinn Nordin kick) | MICH 42–14 |
| 4 | 1:50 | MD | Tyrrell Pigrome 5-yard run (Joseph Petrino kick) | MICH 42–21 |

After its game against Northwestern, Michigan hosted the Maryland Terrapins in its homecoming game.

Following a 70-minute weather delay due to thunderstorms in the area, Michigan defeated Maryland 42–21. Michigan opened the scoring in the first quarter on a 34-yard field goal by Quinn Nordin. Maryland responded with a 98-yard kickoff return by Ty Johnson, to take its first and only lead of the game. Michigan scored 14 points in the second quarter on a one-yard run by Ben Mason and a 22-yard touchdown pass from Shea Patterson to Ronnie Bell, which made the score 17–7 in favor of Michigan at half-time. Michigan extended its lead in the third quarter on a 31-yard field goal by Nordin and a 34-yard touchdown pass from Patterson to Donovan Peoples-Jones. Michigan added 15 points in the fourth quarter on a seven-yard touchdown pass from Patterson to Jared Wangler, and a two-point conversion Mason run, and a 46-yard interception return by Brandon Watson. Maryland added 14 points on a one-yard run from Javon Leake, and a five-yard touchdown run from Tyrrell Pigrome.

Michigan's honorary captain for the game was former director of strength and conditioning Mike Gittleson. Running back Karan Higdon rushed for 103 yards, becoming the 23rd player in program history to surpass 2,000 career rushing yards (2,020). Michigan's defense, which entered the game leading the nation in total defense at 232.6 yards per game, held Maryland to 220 yards of total offense, nearly 180 yards less than its average of 399.8 entering the game.

=== Wisconsin ===
Wisconsin at Michigan

| Team | 1 | 2 | 3 | 4 | Total |
|---|---|---|---|---|---|
| No. 15 Badgers | 0 | 7 | 0 | 6 | 13 |
| • No. 12 Wolverines | 0 | 13 | 8 | 17 | 38 |

- Date: October 13
- Location: Michigan Stadium
  Ann Arbor, MI
- Game start: 7:42 pm EDT
- Elapsed time: 3:07
- Game attendance: 111,360
- Game weather: Mid 40s, Partly cloudy, SW 10–15 MPH
- Referee: Daniel Capron
- TV announcers (ABC): Chris Fowler (play-by-play), Kirk Herbstreit (analyst), Maria Taylor (sideline)

Scoring summary
| 2 | 13:33 | MICH | Karan Higdon 2-yard run (Quinn Nordin kick) | MICH 7–0 |
| 2 | 11:26 | WISC | Kendric Pryor 33-yard run (Rafael Gaglianone kick) | Tied 7–7 |
| 2 | 4:12 | MICH | Quinn Nordin 42-yard field goal | MICH 10–7 |
| 2 | 3:11 | MICH | Quinn Nordin 33-yard field goal | MICH 13–7 |
| 3 | 10:21 | MICH | Shea Patterson 7-yard run (Shea Patterson pass to Nico Collins for two-point conversion) | MICH 21–7 |
| 4 | 11:36 | MICH | Quinn Nordin 35-yard field goal | MICH 24–7 |
| 4 | 9:55 | MICH | Lavert Hill 21-yard interception return (Quinn Nordin kick) | MICH 31–7 |
| 4 | 5:16 | MICH | Dylan McCaffrey 44-yard run (Quinn Nordin kick) | MICH 38–7 |
| 4 | 3:47 | WISC | A. J. Taylor 3-yard pass from Alex Hornibrook | MICH 38–13 |

Following its homecoming game against Maryland, Michigan hosted the Wisconsin Badgers.

Michigan defeated Wisconsin 38–13. After a scoreless first quarter, Michigan got on the board first with a two-yard touchdown run from Karan Higdon. Wisconsin responded with a 33-yard touchdown run from Kendric Pryor, for its only points of the first half, to tie the game. Michigan regained the lead following two field goals from Quinn Nordin from 42-yards and 33-yards, respectively, which made the score 13–7 in favor of Michigan at half-time. Michigan extended its lead in the third quarter on a seven-yard touchdown run from Shea Patterson, followed by a two-point conversion pass to Nico Collins. Michigan added 17 more points in the fourth quarter. First with a 35-yard field goal by Nordin, then a 21-yard interception return from Lavert Hill and a 44-yard touchdown run from Dylan McCaffrey. Wisconsin then scored its only points of the second half on a three-yard touchdown pass from Alex Hornibrook to A. J. Taylor.

Michigan's defense held Wisconsin to season-lows of 283 total yards, 100 passing yards and 183 rushing yards. Michigan held Wisconsin to just 2-of-11 (18.2 percent) on third-down conversions. Shea Patterson's 81-yard run early in the second quarter was Michigan's longest since Denard Robinson's 87-yard run against Notre Dame in 2010. It was tied for the 15th longest run from scrimmage in Michigan history and was the second longest run by a Michigan quarterback. Lavert Hill's 21-yard interception return for a touchdown was his second of his career, becoming the third player in Michigan program history to register two interception returns for touchdowns, following Lance Dottin and Thom Darden.

=== At Michigan State ===
Paul Bunyan Trophy: #6 Michigan Wolverines (6–1) at #24 Michigan State Spartans (4–2)

| Quarter | 1 | 2 | 3 | 4 | Total |
|---|---|---|---|---|---|
| Michigan | 0 | 7 | 7 | 7 | 21 |
| Michigan State | 0 | 0 | 7 | 0 | 7 |

at Spartan Stadium • East Lansing, Michigan

- Date: October 20
- Game time: 12:05 p.m.
- Game weather: Partly cloudy • 52 °F (11 °C) • Wind 13 W
- Game attendance: 76,131
- Referee: Jerry McGinn
- TV announcers (Fox): Gus Johnson, Joel Klatt, and Jenny Taft
- Box Score

Game information

Michigan

- Shea Patterson
  14/25, 212 Yds, 2 TD
- Karan Higdon
  33 Rush, 144 Yds
- Donovan Peoples-Jones
  1 Rec, 79 Yds, TD

Michigan State

- Brian Lewerke
  5/25, 66 Yds
- L. J. Scott
  10 Rush, 25 Yds
- Darrell Stewart Jr.
  2 Rec, 24 Yds

After its game against Wisconsin, Michigan traveled to East Lansing to face its in-state rival, the Michigan State Spartans, in the battle for the Paul Bunyan Trophy.

Michigan defeated Michigan State 21–7. After a scoreless first quarter, Michigan scored first with a six-yard touchdown pass from Shea Patterson to Nico Collins, which made the score 7–0 in favor of Michigan at half-time. Michigan State opened the scoring in the second half on a four-yard touchdown pass from Darrell Stewart Jr. to Brian Lewerke to tie the game, for its only points of the game. Michigan responded with a 79-yard touchdown pass from Patterson to Donovan Peoples-Jones to re-gain the lead. Michigan extended its lead in the fourth quarter on a five-yard touchdown run from Ben Mason.

Michigan's defense held Michigan State to just 94 total yards of offense, including 15 yards rushing. This was its fewest total yards gained in a game since only having 56 total yards of offense in 1947, also against Michigan. Michigan State entered the game averaging 394.5 yards of offense. Michigan has held seven of eight opponents to their season low in yardage this year. Michigan State failed to convert a third-down attempt, going 0-for-12 during the game. The seven points scored by Michigan State were the fewest in a rivalry game against Michigan since 2002, when Michigan won 49–3. Karan Higdon finished the game with 139 rushing yards, his sixth consecutive game surpassing 100-yards. With the win, Michigan snapped a 17 game losing streak to ranked opponents on the road. The team went into its bye week with a 7–1 record.

Scoring summary

| Quarter | Time | Drive | | | Team | Scoring information | Score | |
| Quarter | Time | Plays | Yards | TOP | Team | Scoring information | MICH | MSU |
|---|---|---|---|---|---|---|---|---|
| 2 | 14:55 | 14 | 84 | 7:56 | Michigan | Nico Collins 6-yard touchdown reception from Shea Patterson, Quinn Nordin kick good | 7 | 0 |
| 3 | 11:12 | 2 | 7 | 0:48 | Michigan State | Brian Lewerke 4-yard touchdown reception from Darrell Stewart, Matt Coghlin kick good | 7 | 7 |
| 3 | 2:24 | 1 | 79 | 0:11 | Michigan | Donovan Peoples-Jones 79-yard touchdown reception from Shea Patterson, Quinn Nordin kick good | 14 | 7 |
| 4 | 10:21 | 13 | 84 | 6:41 | Michigan | Ben Mason 5-yard touchdown run, Quinn Nordin kick good | 21 | 7 |
| "TOP" = time of possession. For other American football terms, see Glossary of American football. | | | | | | | 21 | 7 |

=== Penn State ===
Penn State at Michigan

| Team | 1 | 2 | 3 | 4 | Total |
|---|---|---|---|---|---|
| No. 14 Nittany Lions | 0 | 0 | 0 | 7 | 7 |
| • No. 5 Wolverines | 7 | 7 | 14 | 14 | 42 |

- Date: November 3
- Location: Michigan Stadium
  Ann Arbor, MI
- Game start: 3:50 EST
- Elapsed time: 3:17
- Game attendance: 111,747
- Game weather: High 40s, Partly cloudy, NW 15–20 MPH
- Referee: Jeff Servinski
- TV announcers (ESPN): Chris Fowler (play-by-play), Kirk Herbstreit (analyst), Maria Taylor (sideline)

Scoring summary
| 1 | 8:12 | MICH | Shea Patterson 1-yard run (Quinn Nordin kick) | MICH 7–0 |
| 2 | 6:52 | MICH | Donovan Peoples-Jones 23-yard pass from Shea Patterson (Quinn Nordin kick) | MICH 14–0 |
| 3 | 0:56 | MICH | Zach Gentry 7-yard pass from Shea Patterson (Quinn Nordin kick) | MICH 21–0 |
| 3 | 0:09 | MICH | Brandon Watson 62-yard interception return (Quinn Nordin kick) | MICH 28–0 |
| 4 | 9:49 | MICH | Karan Higdon 4-yard run (Quinn Nordin kick) | MICH 35–0 |
| 4 | 7:44 | MICH | Chris Evans 1-yard run (Quinn Nordin kick) | MICH 42–0 |
| 4 | 1:59 | PSU | Tommy Stevens 8-yard run (Jake Pinegar kick) | MICH 42–7 |

After facing in-state rival Michigan State and having a bye week, Michigan hosted the Penn State Nittany Lions.

Michigan won in a blowout, 42–7. Michigan opened the scoring in the first quarter with a one-yard touchdown run from Shea Patterson. Michigan extended its lead in the second quarter on a 23-yard touchdown pass from Patterson to Donovan Peoples-Jones, which made the score 14–0 in favor of Michigan at half-time. Michigan added 14 points in the third quarter on a seven-yard touchdown pass from Patterson to Zach Gentry and a 62-yard interception return by Brandon Watson. Michigan added 14 more points in the fourth quarter on a four-yard touchdown run from Karan Higdon, and a one-yard touchdown run from Chris Evans. Penn State finally got on the board late in the fourth quarter on an eight-yard touchdown run from Tommy Stevens to avoid a shutout.

Michigan's honorary captains for the game were alumni Bryan and Kathleen Marshall, and former Michigan basketball star and Fab Five member Chris Webber. Michigan's defense held Penn State to just 77 total yards in the first half, and allowing just 186 total yards during the game. This marked an FBS-best eighth time allowing less than 100 yards in a half this season. Higdon rushed for 132 yards, his seventh consecutive game surpassing 100-yards. This is the second-longest streak in Michigan program history, trailing only Mike Hart's eight consecutive games with 100-yards rushing in 2007. With his interception return for a touchdown in the third quarter, Brandon Watson became the fourth player in program history with two or more interceptions returned for touchdowns, joining Lavert Hill, Thom Darden and Lance Dottin.

=== At Rutgers ===
Michigan at Rutgers

| Team | 1 | 2 | 3 | 4 | Total |
|---|---|---|---|---|---|
| • No. 4 Wolverines | 7 | 14 | 14 | 7 | 42 |
| Scarlet Knights | 7 | 0 | 0 | 0 | 7 |

- Date: November 10
- Location: High Point Solutions Stadium
  Piscataway, NJ
- Game start: 3:46 EST
- Elapsed time: 2:51
- Game attendance: 43,786
- Game weather: 43º F, Sunny, NW 18 MPH
- Referee: Daniel Capron
- TV announcers (BTN): Kevin Kugler (play-by-play), James Laurinaitis (analyst), Rick Pizzo (sideline)

Scoring summary
| 1 | 1:45 | MICH | Karan Higdon 1-yard run (Quinn Nordin kick) | MICH 7–0 |
| 1 | 0:26 | RU | Isiah Pacheco 80-yard run (Justin Davidovicz kick) | Tied 7–7 |
| 2 | 9:33 | MICH | Karan Higdon 1-yard run (Quinn Nordin kick) | MICH 14–7 |
| 2 | 5:07 | MICH | Nico Collins 36-yard pass from Shea Patterson (Quinn Nordin kick) | MICH 21–7 |
| 3 | 11:12 | MICH | Oliver Martin 16-yard pass from Shea Patterson (Quinn Nordin kick) | MICH 28–7 |
| 3 | 0:56 | MICH | Nico Collins 10-yard pass from Shea Patterson (Quinn Nordin kick) | MICH 35–7 |
| 4 | 11:26 | MICH | Chris Evans 61-yard run (Quinn Nordin kick) | MICH 42–7 |

After hosting Penn State, Michigan traveled to Piscataway, New Jersey to face the Rutgers Scarlet Knights.

Michigan won in a blowout, 42–7. Michigan opened the scoring in the first quarter with a one-yard touchdown run from Karan Higdon. Rutgers responded with an 80-yard touchdown run from Isiah Pacheco to tie the game. Michigan responded with 35 unanswered points. Michigan added 14 points in the second quarter on a one-yard touchdown run from Higdon and a 36-yard touchdown pass from Shea Patterson to Nico Collins, which made the score 21–7 in favor of Michigan at half-time. Michigan again added 14 points in the third quarter on a 16-yard touchdown pass from Patterson to Oliver Martin, and a 10-yard touchdown pass from Patterson to Collins. Michigan added seven points in the fourth quarter on a 61-yard touchdown run from Chris Evans.

Michigan's defense allowed only 59 passing yards, the lowest by any team against Michigan this year. Michigan held Rutgers to just 4-of-12 on third-down conversions. Michigan tied a season-high with 24 first downs during the game. Higdon rushed for 42 yards, surpassing the 1,000-yard rushing mark in the second quarter. He became the first 1,000-yard running back for Michigan since Fitzgerald Toussaint in 2011, and the first player of any kind to rush for over 1,000 yards since Denard Robinson in 2012.

=== Indiana ===
Indiana at Michigan

| Team | 1 | 2 | 3 | 4 | Total |
|---|---|---|---|---|---|
| Hoosiers | 7 | 10 | 0 | 3 | 20 |
| • No. 4 Wolverines | 3 | 12 | 10 | 6 | 31 |

- Date: November 17
- Location: Michigan Stadium
  Ann Arbor, MI
- Game start: 4:10 EST
- Elapsed time: 3:38
- Game attendance: 110,118
- Game weather: Mid 30s, Cloudy possible snow, W 5–10 MPH
- Referee: John O'Neill
- TV announcers (FS1): Gus Johnson (play-by-play), Joel Klatt (analyst), Jenny Taft (sideline)

Scoring summary
| 1 | 10:41 | MICH | Jake Moody 32-yard field goal | MICH 3–0 |
| 1 | 4:14 | IND | Stevie Scott 13-yard run (Logan Justus kick) | IND 7–3 |
| 2 | 14:15 | MICH | Jake Moody 30-yard field goal | IND 7–6 |
| 2 | 9:56 | MICH | Jake Moody 31-yard field goal | MICH 9–7 |
| 2 | 7:39 | IND | Logan Justus 41-yard field goal | IND 10–9 |
| 2 | 4:46 | MICH | Nick Eubanks 41-yard pass from Shea Patterson | MICH 15–10 |
| 2 | 1:33 | IND | Ty Fryfogle 7-yard pass from Peyton Ramsey (Logan Justus kick) | IND 17–15 |
| 3 | 9:44 | MICH | Karan Higdon 2-yard run (Jake Moody kick) | MICH 22–17 |
| 3 | 2:08 | MICH | Jake Moody 33-yard field goal | MICH 25–17 |
| 4 | 9:55 | MICH | Jake Moody 33-yard field goal | MICH 28–17 |
| 4 | 6:10 | IND | Logan Justus 36-yard field goal | Michigan 28–20 |
| 4 | 2:37 | MICH | Jake Moody 29-yard field goal | MICH 31–20 |

Following its game against Rutgers, Michigan played its final home game against Indiana.

Michigan defeated Indiana 31–20. Michigan opened the scoring in the first quarter with a 32-yard field goal by Jake Moody. Indiana responded with a 13-yard touchdown run from Stevie Scott, to take its first lead of the game. Michigan added 12 points during the second quarter on two field goals by Moody, from 30-yards, and 31-yards respectively, and a 41-yard touchdown pass from Shea Patterson to Nick Eubanks. Indiana added 10 points on a 41-yard field goal by Logan Justus and a seven-yard touchdown pass from Peyton Ramsey to Ty Fryfogle, which made the score 17–15 in favor of Indiana at half-time. Michigan added 10 points in the third quarter on a two-yard touchdown run from Karan Higdon and a 33-yard field goal by Moody to regain the lead. Michigan extended its lead in the fourth quarter on two more field goals by Moody, from 23-yards, and 29-yards, respectively. Indiana responded with a 32-yard field goal by Justus, for its only points of the second half.

Freshman kicker Jake Moody set a Michigan single-game record with six field goals, going 6-for-6 in his collegiate placekicking debut. Running back Karan Higdon recorded his eighth 100-yard game this season. Higdon's 100-yard game was the 13th of his career, tying him with Gordon Bell, Billy Taylor and Tim Biakabutuka for the eighth-most 100-yard rushing games during a career in Michigan program history.

=== At Ohio State ===
#4 Michigan Wolverines (10–1) at #10 Ohio State Buckeyes (10–1)

| Quarter | 1 | 2 | 3 | 4 | Total |
|---|---|---|---|---|---|
| No. 4 Wolverines | 3 | 16 | 0 | 20 | 39 |
| No. 10 Buckeyes | 7 | 17 | 17 | 21 | 62 |

at Ohio Stadium • Columbus, Ohio

- Date: November 24
- Game time: 12:00 p.m. EDT
- Game weather: Cloudy • 48 °F (9 °C) • Wind 11 miles per hour (18 km/h; 9.6 kn)
- Game attendance: 106,588
- Referee: Mike Cannon
- TV announcers (Fox): Gus Johnson, Joel Klatt and Jenny Taft
- Box Score

Game information

Michigan

- Shea Patterson
  20/34, 187 Yds, 3 TD, INT
- Karan Higdon
  15 Rush, 72 Yds
- Nico Collins
  4 Rec, 91 Yds, 2 TD

Ohio State

- Dwayne Haskins
  20/31, 396 Yds, 6 TD
- Mike Weber
  13 Rush, 96 Yds, TD
- Parris Campbell
  6 Rec, 192 Yds, 2 TD

Following its home finale against Indiana, Michigan traveled to Columbus, Ohio to face its arch-rival, the Ohio State Buckeyes, in the 115th playing of "The Game".

Michigan was defeated by Ohio State 62–39. Ohio State opened the scoring in the first quarter with a 24-yard touchdown pass from Dwayne Haskins to Chris Olave. Michigan responded with a 39-yard field goal by Jake Moody. Michigan scored 16 points in the second quarter on a 31-yard field goal by Moody, a 23-yard touchdown pass from Shea Patterson to Nico Collins, and a nine-yard touchdown pass from Patterson to Chris Evans. Ohio State scored 17 points in the quarter on a 24-yard touchdown pass from Haskins to Olave, a 31-yard touchdown pass from Haskins to Johnnie Dixon and a 19-yard field goal by Blake Haubeil as time expired, which made the score 24–19 in favor of Ohio State at half-time. Ohio State added 17 points in the third quarter on a 19-yard field goal by Haubeil, a 33-yard punt return by Sevyn Banks and a two-yard touchdown run from Mike Weber. Michigan scored 20 points in the fourth quarter on a 12-yard touchdown pass from Patterson to Collins, a one-yard touchdown run from Ben Mason, and a four-yard touchdown run from Joe Milton. Ohio State added 21 points on a 78-yard touchdown run from Parris Campbell, a one-yard touchdown pass from Haskins to K. J. Hill, and a 16-yard touchdown pass from Haskins to Campbell.

Michigan finished as co-champions of the Big Ten East Division with an 8–1 record in conference play, for its first division title since the conference introduced divisions in 2011. This was its best conference record since going 7–1 in 2004.

Scoring summary

| Quarter | Time | Drive | | | Team | Scoring information | Score | |
| Quarter | Time | Plays | Yards | TOP | Team | Scoring information | MICH | OSU |
|---|---|---|---|---|---|---|---|---|
| 1 | 11:29 | 6 | 57 | 1:57 | Ohio State | Chris Olave 24-yard touchdown reception from Dwayne Haskins, Blake Haubeil kick good | 0 | 7 |
| 1 | 6:22 | 10 | 44 | 5:00 | Michigan | 39-yard field goal by Jake Moody | 3 | 7 |
| 2 | 14:51 | 12 | 52 | 5:41 | Michigan | 31-yard field goal by Jake Moody | 6 | 7 |
| 2 | 9:08 | 9 | 80 | 2:59 | Ohio State | Chris Olave 24-yard touchdown reception from Dwayne Haskins, Blake Haubeil kick good | 6 | 14 |
| 2 | 3:18 | 8 | 79 | 2:29 | Ohio State | Johnnie Dixon 31-yard touchdown reception from Dwayne Haskins, Blake Haubeil kick good | 6 | 21 |
| 2 | 0:47 | 8 | 79 | 2:29 | Michigan | Nico Collins 23-yard touchdown reception from Shea Patterson, Jake Moody kick good | 13 | 21 |
| 2 | 0:41 | 1 | 9 | 0:04 | Michigan | Chris Evans 9-yard touchdown reception from Shea Patterson, 2-point pass failed | 19 | 21 |
| 2 | 0:00 | 7 | 74 | 0:41 | Ohio State | 19-yard field goal by Blake Haubeil | 19 | 24 |
| 3 | 8:25 | 9 | 56 | 3:45 | Ohio State | 19-yard field goal by Blake Haubeil | 19 | 27 |
| 3 | 4:41 | | | | Ohio State | Blocked punt returned 33 yards for touchdown by Sevyn Banks, Blake Haubeil kick good | 19 | 34 |
| 3 | 3:10 | 2 | 22 | 0:35 | Ohio State | Mike Weber 2-yard touchdown run, Blake Haubeil kick good | 19 | 41 |
| 4 | 14:11 | 8 | 75 | 3:59 | Michigan | Nico Collins 12-yard touchdown reception from Shea Patterson, 2-point pass failed | 25 | 41 |
| 4 | 13:55 | 1 | 78 | 0:11 | Ohio State | Parris Campbell 78-yard touchdown reception from Dwayne Haskins, Blake Haubeil kick good | 25 | 48 |
| 4 | 9:35 | 11 | 86 | 4:13 | Michigan | Ben Mason 1-yard touchdown run, Jake Moody kick good | 32 | 48 |
| 4 | 6:59 | 6 | 75 | 2:36 | Ohio State | K. J. Hill 1-yard touchdown reception from Dwayne Haskins, Blake Haubeil kick good | 32 | 55 |
| 4 | 5:26 | 3 | 19 | 1:16 | Ohio State | Parris Campbell 16-yard touchdown reception from Dwayne Haskins, Blake Haubeil kick good | 32 | 62 |
| 4 | 3:16 | 6 | 75 | 2:10 | Michigan | Joe Milton 4-yard touchdown run, Jake Moody kick good | 39 | 62 |
| "TOP" = time of possession. For other American football terms, see Glossary of American football. | | | | | | | 39 | 62 |

=== Vs. Florida (Peach Bowl) ===
Michigan vs. Florida
(Peach Bowl)

| Team | 1 | 2 | 3 | 4 | Total |
|---|---|---|---|---|---|
| No. 8 Wolverines | 7 | 3 | 0 | 5 | 15 |
| • No. 10 Gators | 3 | 10 | 14 | 14 | 41 |

- Date: December 29
- Location: Mercedes-Benz Stadium
  Atlanta, GA
- Game start: 12:06 EST
- Elapsed time: 3:28
- Game attendance: 74,006
- Game weather: Indoor
- Referee: Mike Defee
- TV announcers (ESPN): Bob Wischusen and Brock Huard

Scoring summary
| 1 | 5:37 | UF | Evan McPherson 21-yard field goal | UF 3–0 |
| 1 | 2:03 | MICH | Donovan Peoples-Jones 9-yard pass from Shea Patterson | MICH 7–3 |
| 2 | 12:22 | UF | Evan McPherson 26-yard field goal | MICH 7–6 |
| 2 | 5:56 | MICH | Jake Moody 48-yard field goal | MICH 10–6 |
| 2 | 2:41 | UF | Feleipe Franks 20-yard run (Evan McPherson kick) | UF 13–10 |
| 3 | 8:06 | UF | Feleipe Franks 5-yard pass to La'Mical Perine (Evan McPherson kick) | UF 20–10 |
| 3 | 2:34 | UF | Jordan Scarlett 1-yard run (Evan McPherson kick) | UF 27–10 |
| 4 | 12:16 | MICH | Jake Moody 26-yard field goal | UF 27–13 |
| 4 | 9:21 | UF | La'Mical Perine 53-yard run (Evan McPherson kick) | UF 34–13 |
| 4 | 4:58 | MICH | Team -20-yards safety | UF 34–15 |
| 4 | 4:43 | UF | C. J. Gardner-Johnson 30-yard interception return (Evan McPherson kick) | UF 41–15 |

On December 2, Michigan was selected to play in the Peach Bowl against the Florida Gators. Michigan won the previous meeting in the 2017 Advocare Classic, by a score of 33–17. This was Michigan's 47th bowl game appearance, and its first appearance in the Peach Bowl.

Florida defeated Michigan 41–15. Florida opened the scoring in the first quarter with a 21-yard field goal by Evan McPherson. Michigan responded with a nine-yard touchdown pass from Shea Patterson to Donovan Peoples-Jones. Michigan extended its lead in the second quarter on a 48-yard field goal by Jake Moody. Florida added ten points in the quarter on a 26-yard field goal by McPherson and a 20-yard touchdown run from Feleipe Franks, which made the score 13–10 in favor of Florida at half-time. Florida added 14 points in the third quarter on a five-yard touchdown pass from Franks to La'Mical Perine, and a one-yard touchdown run from Jordan Scarlett. Michigan added five points in the fourth quarter on a 26-yard field goal by Moody and a safety. Florida extended its lead on a 53-yard touchdown run from Perine and a 30-yard interception return from C. J. Gardner-Johnson.

== Roster ==
2018 Michigan Wolverines football team roster
Players
Coaches
Offense

| Pos. | # | Name | Class |
|---|---|---|---|
| FB | 5 | Jared Wangler | RSr |
| FB | 40 | Ben VanSumeren | Fr |
| FB | 42 | Ben Mason | So |
| FB | 45 | Peter Bush | RSo |
| FB | 46 | Matt Brown | So |
| FB | 49 | Tyler Plocki | So |
| OL | 50 | Michael Onwenu | Jr |
| OL | 51 | Cesar Ruiz | So |
| OL | 54 | Kraig Correll | Fr |
| OL | 58 | Phillip Paea | So |
| OL | 59 | Joel Honigford | So |
| OL | 61 | Dan Jokisch | RSo |
| OL | 65 | Connor Burrows | Fr |
| OL | 66 | Chuck Filiaga | So |
| OL | 67 | Jess Speight | So |
| OL | 68 | Andrew Vastardis | RSo |
| OL | 70 | Nolan Ulizio | Sr |
| OL | 71 | Andrew Stueber | So |
| OL | 72 | Stephen Spanellis | RSo |
| OL | 73 | Jalen Mayfield | Fr |
| OL | 74 | Ben Bredeson (C) | Jr |
| OL | 75 | Jon Runyan Jr. | RJr |
| OL | 76 | Juwann Bushell-Beatty | RSr |
| OL | 77 | Grant Newsome | RSr |
| OL | 78 | Griffin Korican | Fr |
| OL | 79 | Greg Robinson | RSo |
| QB | 2 | Shea Patterson | Jr |
| QB | 5 | Joe Milton | Fr |
| QB | 6 | Michael Sessa | RSo |
| QB | 10 | Dylan McCaffrey | RFr |
| QB | 15 | Jacob West | Sr |
| QB | 16 | Max Wittwer | Fr |
| QB | 18 | Brandon Peters | RSo |
| RB | 12 | Chris Evans | Jr |
| RB | 22 | Karan Higdon (C) | Sr |
| RB | 23 | O'Maury Samuels | So |
| RB | 24 | Tru Wilson | RSo |
| RB | 25 | Hassan Haskins | Fr |
| RB | 27 | Joe Hewlett | RSr |
| RB | 28 | Christian Turner | Fr |
| RB | 32 | Berkley Edwards | RSr |
| RB | 34 | Julian Garrett | Fr |
| RB | 44 | Jared Char | Jr |
| TE | 34 | Kenneth Ferris | Sr |
| TE | 35 | Luke Buckman | Fr |
| TE | 36 | Ramsey Baty | Fr |
| TE | 37 | Bradford Jones | RSr |
| TE | 38 | Joseph Files | Sr |
| TE | 60 | Ryan Hayes | Fr |
| TE | 82 | Nick Eubanks | RSo |
| TE | 82 | Carter Selzer | So |
| TE | 83 | Zach Gentry | RJr |
| TE | 84 | Sean McKeon | Jr |
| TE | 85 | Mustapha Muhammad | Fr |
| TE | 89 | Luke Schoonmaker | Fr |
| TE | 94 | Ryan Veingrad | So |
| WR | 4 | Nico Collins | So |
| WR | 7 | Tarik Black | So |
| WR | 8 | Ronnie Bell | Fr |
| WR | 9 | Donovan Peoples-Jones | So |
| WR | 24 | Jake Martin | RSo |
| WR | 29 | Brendan White | Sr |
| WR | 41 | Ethan Deland | Fr |
| WR | 43 | Tyler Grosz | Sr |
| WR | 43 | Jake McCurry | So |
| WR | 80 | Oliver Martin | So |
| WR | 81 | Nate Schoenle | RSo |
| WR | 81 | Jack Young | So |
| WR | 88 | Grant Perry | Sr |

Defense

| Pos. | # | Name | Class |
|---|---|---|---|
| DB | 35 | Casey Hughes | RSr |
| ATH | 6 | Michael Barrett | Fr |
| ATH | 14 | Kyle Grady | Fr |
| DB | 1 | Ambry Thomas | So |
| DB | 6 | Myles Sims | Fr |
| DB | 9 | Gemon Green | Fr |
| DB | 13 | German Green | Fr |
| DB | 14 | Josh Metellus | Jr |
| DB | 16 | Jaylen Kelly-Powell | So |
| DB | 17 | Sammy Faustin | Fr |
| DB | 20 | Brad Hawkins | So |
| DB | 20 | Matt Mitchell | RSr |
| DB | 22 | David Long | RSo |
| DB | 23 | Jared Davis | So |
| DB | 23 | Tyree Kinnel (C) | Sr |
| DB | 24 | Lavert Hill | Jr |
| DB | 25 | Benjamin St-Juste | So |
| DB | 26 | J'Marick Woods | So |
| DB | 27 | Hunter Reynolds | So |
| DB | 28 | Brandon Watson | RSr |
| DB | 30 | Tyler Cochrane | RSo |
| DB | 31 | Vincent Gray | Fr |
| DB | 32 | Louis Grodman | Sr |
| DB | 39 | Ryan McCurry | Fr |
| DB | 41 | Quinn Rothman | Fr |
| DB | 46 | Owen Goldsberry | Fr |
| DB | 49 | Lucas Andrighetto | Fr |
| DT | 2 | Carlo Kemp | Jr |
| DE | 3 | Rashan Gary | Jr |
| DE | 4 | Reuben Jones | RJr |
| DT | 5 | Aubrey Solomon | So |
| DE | 15 | Chase Winovich | RSr |
| DE | 18 | Luiji Vilain | So |
| DE | 19 | Kwity Paye | So |
| DL | 37 | Dane Drobocky | RSo |
| DT | 44 | Deron Irving-Bey | So |
| DT | 50 | Michael Dwumfour | RSo |
| DL | 54 | Carl Myers | RSo |
| DL | 57 | Joey George | Fr |
| NT | 90 | Bryan Mone | RSr |
| DE | 91 | Taylor Upshaw | Fr |
| DT | 93 | Lawrence Marshall | RSr |
| DT | 95 | Donovan Jeter | So |
| DE | 96 | Julius Welschof | Fr |
| DE | 97 | Aidan Hutchinson | Fr |
| DE | 97 | Ron Johnson | RSo |
| DL | 99 | John Luby | Sr |
| LB | 6 | Josh Uche | RSo |
| LB | 7 | Khaleke Hudson | Jr |
| LB | 10 | Devin Bush Jr. (C) | Jr |
| LB | 12 | Josh Ross | So |
| LB | 29 | Jordan Glasgow | Sr |
| LB | 34 | Jordan Anthony | So |
| LB | 36 | Devin Gil | RSo |
| LB | 38 | Geoffrey Reeves | Jr |
| LB | 40 | Ryan Nelson | So |
| LB | 41 | Adam Fakih | So |
| LB | 44 | Cameron McGrone | Fr |
| LB | 45 | Adam Shibley | So |
| LB | 52 | Bryce Chamberlain | Fr |
| LB | 56 | Jameson Offerdahl | Sr |
| LB | 59 | Noah Furbush | RSr |
| LB | 88 | Jack Dunaway | Sr |

Special teams

| Pos. | # | Name | Class |
|---|---|---|---|
| K | 3 | Quinn Nordin | Jr |
| K | 2 | Jake Moody | Fr |
| K | 27 | George Caratan | Fr |
| K | 92 | Adam Culp | Fr |
| K, P | 39 | Alan Selzer | Jr |
| LS | 33 | Camaron Cheeseman | Jr |
| LS | 44 | Matt Baldeck | So |
| LS | 49 | Andrew Robinson | RSr |
| P | 3 | Brad Robbins | So |
| P | 17 | Will Hart | RSo |

Head coach

- Jim Harbaugh

Coordinators/assistant coaches

- Don Brown (defensive coordinator / linebackers)
- Pep Hamilton (assistant head coach / passing game coordinator / quarterbacks)
- Jay Harbaugh (running backs / assistant special teams coordinator)
- Greg Mattison (defensive line)
- Jim McElwain (wide receivers)
- Sherrone Moore (tight ends)
- Chris Partridge (special teams coordinator / safeties)
- Ed Warinner (offensive line)
- Al Washington (linebackers)
- Mike Zordich (cornerbacks)

Legend

- (C) Team captain
- (S) Suspended
- (I) Ineligible
- Injured
- Redshirt

Roster
Last update: August 7, 2018

== Awards and honors ==
Weekly Awards
| Player | Award | Date Awarded | Ref. |
|---|---|---|---|
| Ambry Thomas | Co-Big Ten Special Teams Player of the Week | September 3, 2018 | |
| Donovan Peoples-Jones | Co-Big Ten Special Teams Player of the Week | September 24, 2018 | |
| Chase Winovich | Co-Big Ten Defensive Player of the Week | October 1, 2018 | |
| Shea Patterson | Rose Bowl Game B1G Player of the Week | November 5, 2018 | |
| Jake Moody | Co-Big Ten Special Teams Player of the Week | November 19, 2018 | |

Individual Awards
| Player | Award | Ref. |
|---|---|---|
| Devin Bush Jr. | Nagurski–Woodson Defensive Player of the Year; Butkus–Fitzgerald Linebacker of the Year | |
| Will Hart | Eddleman–Fields Punter of the Year | |

All-American
| Player | AP | AFCA | FWAA | TSN | WCFF | Designation |
|---|---|---|---|---|---|---|
| Devin Bush Jr. | 2 | 1 | 1 | 1 | 1 | Consensus |
| Lavert Hill | 3 | | | | | |
| Chase Winovich | 3 | 2 | | | 2 | |
The NCAA recognizes a selection to all five of the AP, AFCA, FWAA, TSN and WCFF first teams for unanimous selections and three of five for consensus selections.

All-Big Ten
| Player | Position | Coaches | Media |
|---|---|---|---|
| Devin Bush Jr. | LB | 1 | 1 |
| Will Hart | P | 1 | 1 |
| Karan Higdon | RB | 1 | 1 |
| Lavert Hill | DB | 1 | 1 |
| Chase Winovich | DL | 1 | 1 |
| Rashan Gary | DL | 1 | 2 |
| Jon Runyan Jr. | OT | 1 | 2 |
| David Long | DB | 1 | 3 |
| Ben Bredeson | OG | 2 | 2 |
| Josh Metellus | DB | 2 | 2 |
| Donovan Peoples-Jones | PR | 3 | 3 |
| Zach Gentry | TE | 3 | Hon. |
| Michael Onwenu | OG | 3 | Hon. |
| Shea Patterson | QB | 3 | Hon. |
| Donovan Peoples-Jones | WR | 3 | Hon. |
| Cesar Ruiz | C | 3 | Hon. |
| Juwann Bushell-Beatty | OT | Hon. | Hon. |
| Josh Uche | DL | Hon. | Hon. |
| Khaleke Hudson | LB | Hon. | Hon. |
| Tyree Kinnel | DB | Hon. | Hon. |
| Nico Collins | WR | Hon. | – |
| Bryan Mone | DL | Hon. | – |
| Josh Ross | LB | Hon. | – |
| Sean McKeon | TE | – | Hon. |
| Kwity Paye | DL | – | Hon. |
Hon. = Honorable mention. Reference:

== 2019 NFL draft ==
The 2019 NFL draft was held on April 25–27, 2019 in Nashville, Tennessee. Five Wolverines were selected as part of the draft, and another six signed with NFL teams as undrafted free agents.

| Round | Pick | Player | Position | NFL team |
|---|---|---|---|---|
| 1 | 10 | Devin Bush Jr. | LB | Pittsburgh Steelers |
| 1 | 12 | Rashan Gary | DE | Green Bay Packers |
| 3 | 77 | Chase Winovich | DE | New England Patriots |
| 3 | 79 | David Long | CB | Los Angeles Rams |
| 5 | 141 | Zach Gentry | TE | Pittsburgh Steelers |
| Undrafted free agent | | Tyree Kinnel | S | Cincinnati Bengals |
| Undrafted free agent | | Karan Higdon | RB | Houston Texans |
| Undrafted free agent | | Brandon Watson | CB | Jacksonville Jaguars |
| Undrafted free agent | | Juwann Bushell-Beatty | OL | Washington Redskins |
| Undrafted free agent | | Lawrence Marshall | DL | Chicago Bears |
| Undrafted free agent | | Bryan Mone | DL | Seattle Seahawks |

Former Michigan starting quarterback Wilton Speight, who grad transferred to UCLA before the 2018 season, also signed as an undrafted free agent with the San Francisco 49ers.
