= 2018 Peach Bowl =

The 2018 Peach Bowl may refer to:

- 2018 Peach Bowl (January) - January 1, 2018, game between the Auburn Tigers and UCF Knights.
- 2018 Peach Bowl (December) - December 29, 2018, game between the Michigan Wolverines and Florida Gators.
