= Rashan Gary =

American football player (born 1997)

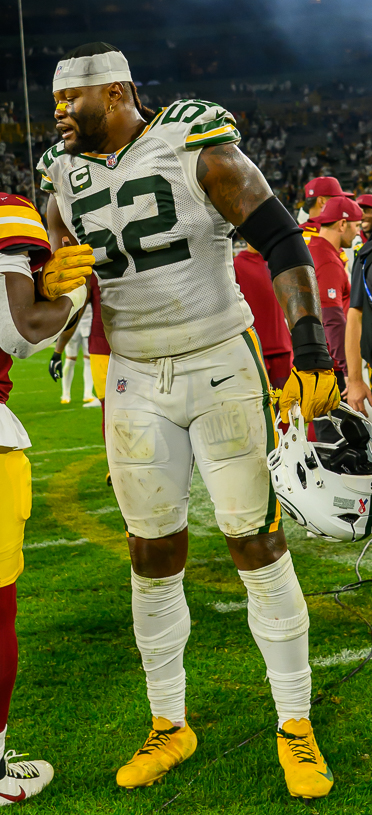
- Gary with the Green Bay Packers in 2025

No. 7 – Dallas Cowboys
- Position: Outside linebacker
- Roster status: Active

Personal information
- Born: December 3, 1997 (age 28); Plainfield, New Jersey, U.S.
- Listed height: 6 ft 5 in (1.96 m)
- Listed weight: 275 lb (125 kg)

Career information
- High school: Paramus Catholic (Paramus, New Jersey)
- College: Michigan (2016–2018)
- NFL draft: 2019: 1st round, 12th overall pick

Career history
- Green Bay Packers (2019–2025); Dallas Cowboys (2026–present)

Awards and highlights
- Pro Bowl (2024); 2× First-team All-Big Ten (2017, 2018)

Career NFL statistics as of Week 10, 2026
- Total tackles: 296
- Sacks: 48.5
- Forced fumbles: 7
- Fumble recoveries: 8
- Pass deflections: 6
- Stats at Pro Football Reference

Rashan Abdul Gary (born December 3, 1997) is an American professional football outside linebacker for the Dallas Cowboys of the National Football League (NFL). He played college football for the Michigan Wolverines and was selected by the Green Bay Packers in the first round of the 2019 NFL draft.

== Early life ==
Gary has dyslexia and said it had a positive effect on his life. "It gave me the push to go above and beyond all my life". Gary first played high school football at Scotch Plains-Fanwood High School, until he transferred to Paramus Catholic High School for his junior and senior seasons, after moving from Scotch Plains, where he lived with his father, to Plainfield with his mother. His first high school claimed that Paramus had recruited Gary, but the NJSIAA unanimously ruled that Scotch-Plains Fanwood had not proven its allegation. During his senior season, he had 13.5 sacks, 55 tackles, including 29 tackles for loss, four forced fumbles and returned a blocked punt for a touchdown in nine games. Following the season, Gary was named USA Today Defensive Player of the Year and High School All-American.

Gary participated in the 2016 Under Armour All-America Game, where he recorded six tackles and three sacks, and was named MVP.

=== Recruiting ===
He became the third player to be named the top player in the country unanimously by all four major recruiting networks, 247Sports.com, ESPN.com, Rivals.com, and Scout.com. In June 2015, Michigan hired Chris Partridge, Gary's former high school head coach, as their director of player personnel and recruiting. In January 2016, he was promoted to linebackers and special teams coach. After visits to Auburn, Clemson, Michigan, Ole Miss, and USC, Gary committed to play college football for the Michigan Wolverines on February 3, 2016.

College recruiting
| Name | Hometown | School | Height | Weight | 40^{‡} | Commit date |
|---|---|---|---|---|---|---|
| Rashan Gary; DT | Paramus, New Jersey | Paramus Catholic | 6 ft 4 in (1.93 m) | 289 lb (131 kg) | 4.86 | Feb 3, 2016 |
| Rashan Gary; DT | Recruit ratings: Scout: Rivals: 247Sports: (94) | | | | | |
Overall recruit ranking: Scout: 1 (DT); 1 (East); 1 (NJ) Rivals: 1 (DT); 1 (Natl); 1 (NJ) 247Sports: 1 (Natl); 1 (DT); 1 (NJ) ESPN: 1 (Natl); 1 (DT); 1 (East); 1 (NJ)
Note: In many cases, Scout, Rivals, 247Sports, On3, and ESPN may conflict in their listings of height and weight.; In these cases, the average was taken. ESPN grades are on a 100-point scale.; Sources: "Michigan Football Commitments". Rivals.; "2016 Michigan Football Commits". Scout.; "ESPN". ESPN.; "Scout.com Team Recruiting Rankings". Scout.; "2016 Team Ranking". Rivals.com.

== College career ==
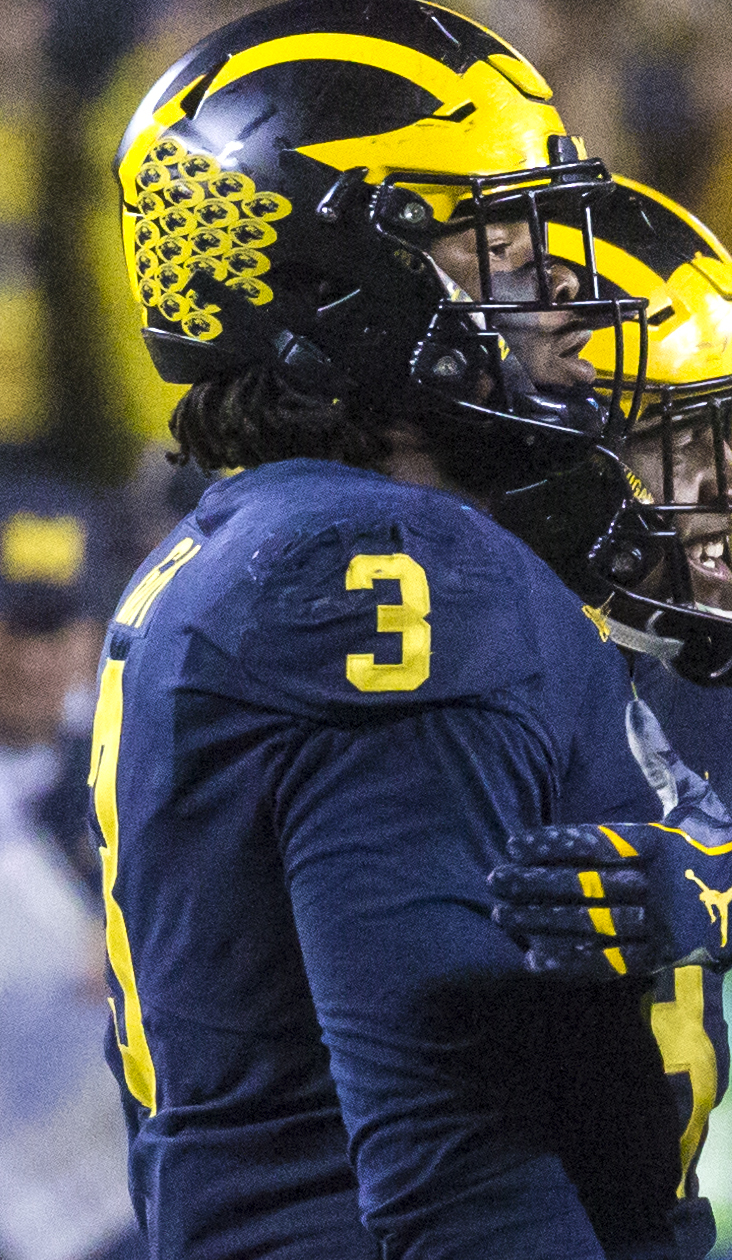
Gary with the Michigan Wolverines in 2017

=== 2016 season ===
As a freshman, Gary played in all thirteen games at defensive end, totaling 23 tackles, 5 tackles for loss, and 1 sack. He was named to the Pro Football Focus College Big Ten Conference Defensive Team of the Week following his performance against UCF on September 10, 2016, in which he had 6 tackles and 2 tackles for loss, including 1 sack.

=== 2017 season ===
During the 2017 season, Gary set career highs in tackles (58), tackles for loss (11.5) and sacks (5.5). Following the 2017 season, Gary was named to the All-Big Ten defensive first team by the coaches, and second team by the media as well as the Associated Press. He made his first career start against Florida in the Advocare Classic on September 2, 2017. After Michigan's game against Indiana on October 14, 2017, Gary was named Defensive Lineman of the Game. Against Maryland on November 11, 2017, Gary had five total tackles including half a tackle for loss earning him co-Defensive Lineman of the Game with Chase Winovich and Maurice Hurst as well as Pro Football Focus College Big Ten Defensive Team of the Week. Following his 2017 season, he was awarded the Richard Katcher Award for the most outstanding defensive lineman or outside linebacker on the 2017 Michigan Wolverines football team.

=== 2018 season ===
Prior to the 2018 season, Gary was named an AP second-team preseason All-American. He was also placed on preseason watchlists for several national awards, including the Chuck Bednarik Award, Bronko Nagurski Trophy, Walter Camp Award, and Ted Hendricks Award.

Gary recorded 38 total tackles during the 2018 season, including 6.5 tackles for a loss, and 3.5 sacks. Gary struggled with a shoulder injury throughout the season, which caused him to see limited playing time in late September and miss the entirety of October games for the Wolverines. Regardless, following the season, he was named to the All-Big Ten defensive first-team by the coaches, and second-team by the media.

On November 26, 2018, after the conclusion of Michigan's regular season, Gary announced he would forgo his senior season to enter the 2019 NFL draft. He decided to sit out the Wolverines' bowl game, the Peach Bowl against Florida, to prepare for the draft.

== Professional career ==
Pre-draft measurables
| Height | Weight | Arm length | Hand span | Wingspan | 40-yard dash | 10-yard split | 20-yard split | 20-yard shuttle | Three-cone drill | Vertical jump | Broad jump | Bench press | Wonderlic |
|---|---|---|---|---|---|---|---|---|---|---|---|---|---|
| 6 ft 4 3/8 in (1.94 m) | 277 lb (126 kg) | 34 1/8 in (0.87 m) | 9 5/8 in (0.24 m) | 6 ft 9 7/8 in (2.08 m) | 4.58 s | 1.63 s | 2.67 s | 4.29 s | 7.26 s | 38 in (0.97 m) | 10 ft 0 in (3.05 m) | 26 reps | 9 |
All values are from NFL Combine

=== Green Bay Packers ===
==== 2019 ====
Before the 2019 NFL draft, Gary founded his own sports agency, Rashan Gary Sports. As of January 2019, the agency has two clients, himself and fellow 2019 NFL prospect Montre Gregory, a cornerback from Bowling Green. Gary stated that he intended to expand the agency to recruit players from the NBA, MLB, and NHL.

Gary was selected 12th overall by the Green Bay Packers in the 2019 NFL draft. Packers scouts said that Gary, who primarily played defensive end in college, would play outside linebacker for Green Bay. Days after the draft, it was revealed that Gary was dealing with a torn labrum in his right shoulder. On May 3, 2019, Gary signed his rookie contract with the Packers. The four-year contract is worth $15.88 million, including a $9.57 million signing bonus During a week 3 game against the Denver Broncos, Gary sacked quarterback Joe Flacco recording his first career sack. In Week 15 against the Chicago Bears, Gary recorded 3 tackles and a sack on Mitchell Trubisky in the 21–13 win.

==== 2020 ====
In Week 2 of the 2020 season against the Detroit Lions, Gary led the team with 1.5 sacks on Matthew Stafford during the 42–21 win. Gary finished the season with 5 sacks in a rotational role with 259 defensive snaps despite his limited playing time, Next Gen Stats named him 9th on a list of the 10 most disruptive defenders in 2020. In the Divisional Round of the playoffs against the Los Angeles Rams, Gary recorded 1.5 sacks on Jared Goff during the 32–18 win.

==== 2021 ====
In 2021, he started full-time at outside linebacker with teammate Za'Darius Smith knocked out from injury. He led all NFC defensive linemen in pressures through Week 12 of the season. He finished the season with a career-best 9.5 sacks and 81 pressures, which finished for third in the league among all edge rushers. During the Packers' playoff loss to the San Francisco 49ers, Gary produced two first-half sacks on 49ers quarterback Jimmy Garoppolo, and caused a turnover on downs by stuffing a 4th and 1 run with 6 minutes to play. The Packers' defense limited the 49ers' offense to just 6 points; however, an especially poor special teams performance produced a 10-point swing against the Packers as they lost 13–10.

==== 2022 ====
The Packers picked up the fifth-year option on Gary's contract on April 29, 2022. On November 6, 2022, he tore his ACL during a Week 9 loss to the Detroit Lions and was carted off the field. The Packers placed him on injured reserve on November 9, ending his season.

==== 2023 ====
On September 24, 2023, Gary led the Packers' defense in a Week 3 win over the New Orleans Saints that tied the biggest fourth-quarter comeback in franchise history (17 points); Gary earned a game ball for recording the first three-sack performance of his career, despite playing limited snaps due to concerns about his previous knee injury. On October 30, 2023, Gary and the Green Bay Packers agreed to a four-year contract extension worth up to $107 million.

==== 2024–2025 ====
On January 2, 2025, Gary was named to the 2025 Pro Bowl Games. He started all 17 games for the Packers for Green Bay during the regular season, recording one pass deflection, one forced fumble, one fumble recovery, 7.5 sacks, and 47 combined tackles.

Gary played in 16 games (including 15 starts) for the Packers in 2025, compiling one pass deflection, one forced fumble, one fumble recovery, 7.5 sacks, and 45 combined tackles.

=== Dallas Cowboys ===
On March 11, 2026, Gary was traded to the Dallas Cowboys in exchange for a 2027 fourth-round draft pick.

== Career statistics ==
=== NFL ===
Legend
| **Bold** | Career high |

==== Regular season ====
| Year | Team | Games | | Tackles | | | | | | Interceptions | | | | | | Fumbles | | | |
| Year | Team | GP | GS | Cmb | Solo | Ast | Sck | TFL | Sfty | PD | Int | Yds | Avg | Lng | TD | FF | FR | Yds | TD |
|---|---|---|---|---|---|---|---|---|---|---|---|---|---|---|---|---|---|---|---|
| 2019 | GB | 16 | 0 | 21 | 13 | 8 | 2.0 | 3 | 0 | 0 | 0 | 0 | 0.0 | 0 | 0 | 0 | 1 | 0 | 0 |
| 2020 | GB | 15 | 4 | 35 | 19 | 16 | 5.0 | 5 | 0 | 1 | 0 | 0 | 0.0 | 0 | 0 | 0 | 1 | **1** | 0 |
| 2021 | GB | 16 | 16 | **47** | **27** | 20 | **9.5** | 8 | 0 | 0 | 0 | 0 | 0.0 | 0 | 0 | **2** | 1 | 0 | 0 |
| 2022 | GB | 9 | 9 | 32 | 21 | 11 | 6.0 | 7 | 0 | 1 | 0 | 0 | 0.0 | 0 | 0 | 1 | 1 | 0 | 0 |
| 2023 | GB | 17 | 13 | 44 | 23 | **21** | 9.0 | 7 | 0 | **2** | 0 | 0 | 0.0 | 0 | 0 | **2** | **2** | 0 | 0 |
| 2024 | GB | 17 | 17 | **47** | 26 | **21** | 7.5 | **9** | 0 | 1 | 0 | 0 | 0.0 | 0 | 0 | 1 | 1 | 0 | 0 |
| 2025 | GB | 16 | 15 | 45 | 25 | 20 | 7.5 | 7 | 0 | 1 | 0 | 0 | 0.0 | 0 | 0 | 1 | 1 | 0 | 0 |
| 2026 | DAL | 10 | 10 | 25 | 15 | 10 | 2.0 | 3 | 0 | 0 | 0 | 0 | 0.0 | 0 | 0 | 0 | 0 | 0 | 0 |
| Total | | 116 | 84 | 296 | 169 | 127 | 48.5 | 49 | 0 | 6 | 0 | 0 | 0.0 | 0 | 0 | 7 | 8 | 1 | 0 |
Source: pro-football-reference.com

==== Postseason ====
| Year | Team | Games | | Tackles | | | | | Interceptions | | | | | | Fumbles | | | |
| Year | Team | GP | GS | Cmb | Solo | Ast | Sck | TFL | PD | Int | Yds | Avg | Lng | TD | FF | FR | Yds | TD |
|---|---|---|---|---|---|---|---|---|---|---|---|---|---|---|---|---|---|---|
| 2019 | GB | 2 | 0 | 2 | 0 | 2 | 0.0 | 0 | 0 | 0 | 0 | 0.0 | 0 | 0 | 0 | 0 | 0 | 0 |
| 2020 | GB | 2 | 0 | **5** | 3 | 2 | 1.5 | 1 | 0 | 0 | 0 | 0.0 | 0 | 0 | 0 | 0 | 0 | 0 |
| 2021 | GB | 1 | 1 | 4 | **4** | 0 | **2.0** | **3** | 0 | 0 | 0 | 0.0 | 0 | 0 | 0 | 0 | 0 | 0 |
| 2023 | GB | 2 | 2 | **5** | 1 | **4** | 0.0 | 0 | 0 | 0 | 0 | 0.0 | 0 | 0 | 0 | 0 | 0 | 0 |
| 2024 | GB | 1 | 1 | 3 | 1 | 2 | 1.0 | 1 | 0 | 0 | 0 | 0.0 | 0 | 0 | 0 | 0 | 0 | 0 |
| 2025 | GB | 1 | 1 | 1 | 1 | 0 | 0.0 | 0 | **1** | 0 | 0 | 0.0 | 0 | 0 | 0 | 0 | 0 | 0 |
| Career | | 9 | 5 | 20 | 10 | 10 | 4.5 | 5 | 1 | 0 | 0 | 0.0 | 0 | 0 | 0 | 0 | 0 | 0 |
Source: pro-football-reference.com

=== College ===
| Season | Team | Class | Pos | GP | Tackles | | | | | Interceptions | | | | | Fumbles | | | |
| Season | Team | Class | Pos | GP | Solo | Ast | Cmb | TfL | Sck | Int | Yds | Avg | TD | PD | FR | Yds | TD | FF |
|---|---|---|---|---|---|---|---|---|---|---|---|---|---|---|---|---|---|---|
| 2016 | Michigan | FR | DE | 12 | 12 | 11 | 23 | 5.0 | 1.0 | 0 | 0 | 0.0 | 0 | 0 | 0 | 0 | 0 | 0 |
| 2017 | Michigan | SO | DL | 13 | 25 | 33 | 58 | 11.5 | 5.5 | 0 | 0 | 0.0 | 0 | 0 | 0 | 0 | 0 | 1 |
| 2018 | Michigan | JR | DL | 9 | 20 | 18 | 38 | 6.5 | 3.5 | 0 | 0 | 0.0 | 0 | 0 | 0 | 0 | 0 | 0 |
| Career | | | | 34 | 57 | 62 | 119 | 23 | 9.5 | 0 | 0 | 0.0 | 0 | 0 | 0 | 0 | 0 | 1 |
