= Juwann Bushell-Beatty =

American gridiron football player (born 1996)

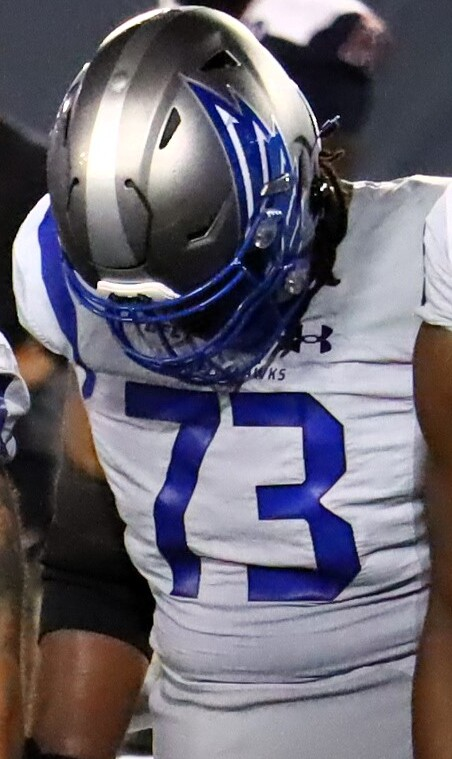
- Bushell-Beatty in 2025

No. 72 – Louisville Kings
- Position: Offensive tackle
- Roster status: Active

Personal information
- Born: June 18, 1996 (age 30); Paramus, New Jersey, U.S.
- Listed height: 6 ft 5 in (1.96 m)
- Listed weight: 341 lb (155 kg)

Career information
- High school: Paramus Catholic (Paramus, New Jersey)
- College: Michigan (2014–2018)
- NFL draft: 2019: undrafted

Career history
- Washington Redskins (2019)*; Dallas Cowboys (2019)*; St. Louis Battlehawks (2020)*; Houston Roughnecks (2020); Carolina Panthers (2020)*; Ottawa Redblacks (2021); Tampa Bay Bandits (2022); St. Louis Battlehawks (2023–2025); Columbus Aviators (2026)*; Louisville Kings (2026–present)
- * Offseason or practice squad member only

Awards and highlights
- UFL champion (2026)

Juwann Nathaniel Bushell-Beatty (born June 18, 1996) is an American professional football offensive tackle for the Louisville Kings of the United Football League (UFL). He played college football at Michigan. He had previous stints with the Washington Redskins, Dallas Cowboys, and Carolina Panthers of the National Football League (NFL), Tampa Bay Bandits of the XFL, and the Ottawa Redblacks of the Canadian Football League (CFL).

== College career ==
Bushell-Beatty played college football for the Michigan Wolverines football team from 2014 to 2018. During his freshman season in 2014 he did not see any action. During his sophomore season in 2015 he played in four games as a reserve offensive lineman. During his junior season in 2016 he appeared in eight games including one start at left tackle. During his senior season in 2017 he appeared in 12 games, including seven starts at right tackle. During his fifth-year senior season in 2018 he started 11 games at right tackle, and earned All-Big Ten honorable mention by both the coaches and media.

== Professional career ==
Pre-draft measurables
Height	Weight	Arm length	Hand span	Wingspan	20-yard shuttle	Three-cone drill	Vertical jump	Broad jump	Bench press
6 ft 5 1/2 in (1.97 m)	315 lb (143 kg)	33 3/4 in (0.86 m)	9 3/4 in (0.25 m)	6 ft 10 in (2.08 m)	4.91 s	8.00 s	25.5 in (0.65 m)	7 ft 11 in (2.41 m)	16 reps
All values from Pro Day

=== Washington Redskins ===
After going undrafted in the 2019 NFL draft, Bushell-Beatty signed with Washington Redskins as an undrafted free agent on April 30, 2019. He was waived by the Redskins on May 28.

=== Dallas Cowboys ===
On August 7, 2019, Bushell-Beatty was signed by the Dallas Cowboys. He was waived by the Cowboys on August 31.

=== St. Louis Battlehawks ===
Bushell-Beatty was drafted 67th overall by the St. Louis Battlehawks in the 2020 XFL draft. On January 21, 2020, he was traded to the Houston Roughnecks, along with Charles James, in exchange for Robert Nelson. Bushell-Beatty had his contract terminated when the league suspended operations on April 10.

=== Carolina Panthers ===
On May 1, 2020, Bushell-Beatty signed with the Carolina Panthers. He was waived by the Panthers on July 31.

=== Ottawa Redblacks ===
On March 3, 2021, Bushell-Beatty signed with the Ottawa Redblacks of the Canadian Football League (CFL). He dressed for six games during 2021 season but was ultimately not re-signed.

=== Tampa Bay Bandits ===
On February 22, 2022, Bushell-Beatty was drafted 58th overall by the Tampa Bay Bandits in the 2022 USFL draft. He was transferred to the team's inactive roster on May 6, with an illness. Bushell-Beatty was moved back to the active roster on May 11.

=== St. Louis Battlehawks (second stint) ===
On January 1, 2023, Bushell-Beatty was selected by the Battlehawks in the first round of the 2023 XFL supplemental draft. He re–signed with the team on January 22, 2024, and again on August 26.

=== Columbus Aviators ===
On January 12, 2026, Bushell-Beatty was allocated to the Columbus Aviators of the United Football League (UFL). He was released by the Aviators on March 19.

=== Louisville Kings ===
On May 4, 2026, Bushell-Beatty signed with the Louisville Kings of the United Football League (UFL).
