= Mones =

Mones, Monès or Monés may refer to:

== People ==
- Álvaro Mones (born 1942), Uruguayan biologist and paleontologist
- Giovanni Andrea Mones (1759–1803), Italian painter and architect
- Isidro Monés (born 1947), Spanish comic book artist
- Monès Chéry (born 1981), Haitian footballer
- Nicole Mones (born 1952), American novelist and food writer
- Paul Mones, American lawyer and author
- Skylar Mones, American songwriter, record producer, engineer, and arranger

== Places ==
- Monès, a commune in the Haute-Garonne department in southwestern France
- Mones Quintela, a town in the Artigas Department of northern Uruguay

== Other uses ==
- Anoncia mones, a moth in the family Cosmopterigidae

== See also ==
- Mone (disambiguation)
