= Zach Gentry =

American football player (born 1996)

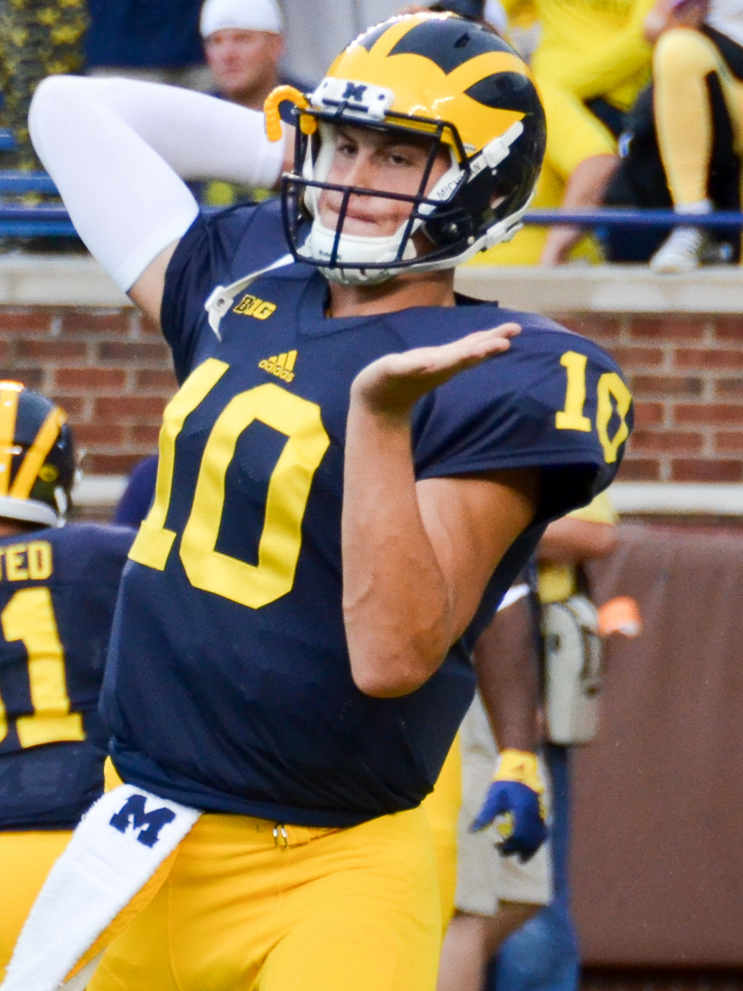
- Gentry with the Michigan Wolverines in 2015

No. 81, 88
- Position: Tight end

Personal information
- Born: September 10, 1996 (age 30); Albuquerque, New Mexico, U.S.
- Listed height: 6 ft 8 in (2.03 m)
- Listed weight: 265 lb (120 kg)

Career information
- High school: Eldorado (Albuquerque)
- College: Michigan (2015–2018)
- NFL draft: 2019: 5th round, 141st overall pick

Career history
- Pittsburgh Steelers (2019–2022); Cincinnati Bengals (2023)*; Las Vegas Raiders (2023)
- * Offseason or practice squad member only

Awards and highlights
- Third-team All-Big Ten (2018)

Career NFL statistics
- Receptions: 39
- Receiving yards: 303
- Stats at Pro Football Reference

Zach Gentry (born September 10, 1996) is an American former professional football player who was a tight end in the National Football League (NFL). He played college football for the Michigan Wolverines.

== Early life ==
Gentry was a star quarterback for Eldorado High School in his hometown of Albuquerque, New Mexico.

== College career ==
Gentry played college football for the Michigan Wolverines from 2015 to 2018. Originally recruited as a quarterback, Gentry switched to tight end as a freshman, after coach Jim Harbaugh said he would go to the NFL as a tight end.

== Professional career ==
Pre-draft measurables
Height	Weight	Arm length	Hand span	40-yard dash	10-yard split	20-yard split	20-yard shuttle	Three-cone drill	Vertical jump	Broad jump	Bench press
6 ft 8 1/8 in (2.04 m)	265 lb (120 kg)	34 1/8 in (0.87 m)	9 1/2 in (0.24 m)	4.77 s	1.71 s	2.63 s	4.53 s	7.20 s	29.5 in (0.75 m)	9 ft 2 in (2.79 m)	14 reps
All values from NFL Combine/Pro Day

=== Pittsburgh Steelers ===
Gentry was selected by the Pittsburgh Steelers in the fifth round (141st overall) of the 2019 NFL draft. The Steelers originally acquired the selection in a trade that sent Antonio Brown to the Oakland Raiders. Gentry caught his first professional pass for four yards in Week 15 against the Buffalo Bills.

On November 24, 2020, Gentry was placed on injured reserve after suffering a knee sprain in Week 11.

Gentry played in all 17 games of the 2021 season. In the Steelers' playoff game against the Kansas City Chiefs, Gentry caught four passes on the game's final drive, including the final professional pass thrown by Ben Roethlisberger.

On April 4, 2023, Gentry re-signed with the Steelers. On August 29, 2023, he was released by the Steelers.

=== Cincinnati Bengals ===
Gentry signed with the practice squad of the Cincinnati Bengals on September 5, 2023.

=== Las Vegas Raiders ===
On December 27, 2023, Gentry was signed to the Las Vegas Raiders active roster from the Bengals practice squad. He was released on August 27, 2024.

== NFL career statistics ==
Legend
**Bold**	Career high

=== Regular season ===
Year	Team	Games		Receiving					Fumbles	
Year	Team	GP	GS	Rec	Yds	Y/R	Lng	TD	Fum	Lost
2019	PIT	4	0	1	4	4.0	4	0	0	0
2020	PIT	2	1	0	0	0.0	0	0	0	0
2021	PIT	17	12	**19**	**167**	**8.8**	25	0	0	0
2022	PIT	17	13	**19**	132	6.9	**32**	0	0	0
2023	LV	1	0	0	0	0.0	0	0	0	0
Career		41	26	39	303	7.8	32	0	0	0

=== Postseason ===
Year	Team	Games		Receiving					Fumbles	
Year	Team	GP	GS	Rec	Yds	Y/R	Lng	TD	Fum	Lost
2021	PIT	1	0	4	33	8.3	11	0	0	0
Career		1	0	4	33	8.3	11	0	0	0
