= Chase Winovich =

American football player (born 1995)

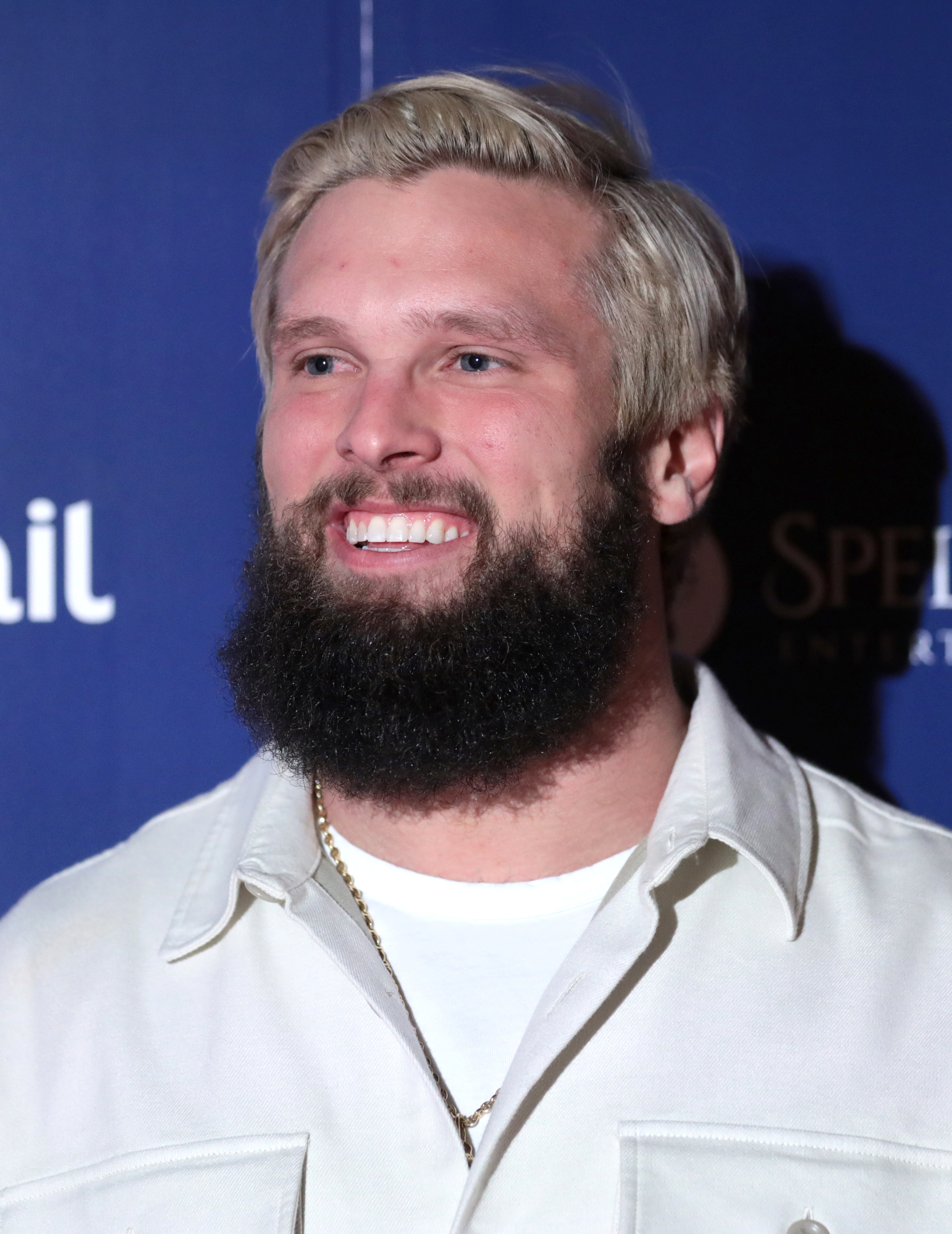
- Winovich in 2023

No. 50, 69
- Position: Defensive end

Personal information
- Born: April 19, 1995 (age 31); Jefferson Hills, Pennsylvania, U.S.
- Listed height: 6 ft 3 in (1.91 m)
- Listed weight: 250 lb (113 kg)

Career information
- High school: Thomas Jefferson (Jefferson Hills)
- College: Michigan (2014–2018)
- NFL draft: 2019: 3rd round, 77th overall pick

Career history
- New England Patriots (2019–2021); Cleveland Browns (2022); Houston Texans (2023)*; Miami Dolphins (2023)
- * Offseason or practice squad member only

Awards and highlights
- Second-team All-American (2018); 2× First-team All-Big Ten (2017, 2018)

Career NFL statistics
- Total tackles: 107
- Sacks: 12
- Pass deflections: 3
- Interceptions: 1
- Forced fumbles: 1
- Stats at Pro Football Reference

Chase Camden Winovich (/ˈwɪnoʊvɪtʃ/) (born April 19, 1995) is an American former professional football player who was a defensive end for five seasons in the National Football League (NFL). He played college football for the Michigan Wolverines. He was a two-time All-Big Ten Conference selection, and received All-American honors in 2018. He was selected by the New England Patriots in the third round of the 2019 NFL draft. Winovich spent his first three seasons with the Patriots, also playing for the Cleveland Browns, Houston Texans and Miami Dolphins.

== Early life ==
Winovich played linebacker and quarterback at Thomas Jefferson High School in Pennsylvania, where he committed to Michigan over offers from Arizona, Arkansas, Florida State, Michigan State, Missouri, Northwestern, Ohio State, Pitt, Tennessee, Virginia Tech, and West Virginia. At times he also played safety and return specialist. Despite being a lifelong Ohio State fan and having an offer from Ohio State, he committed to Michigan due to his connection to Michigan head coach Brady Hoke. Winovich's brother-in-law was also a huge Michigan fan. On National Signing Day, February 5, 2014, Winovich was the first to submit his National Letter of Intent paperwork, which was officially processed at 7:03 a.m., to Michigan.

College recruiting
Name	Hometown	School	Height	Weight	40^{‡}	Commit date
Chase Winovich; LB	Jefferson Hills, Pennsylvania	Thomas Jefferson H.S.	6 ft 3.5 in (1.92 m)	217 lb (98 kg)	—	Jun 1, 2013
Chase Winovich; LB	Recruit ratings: Scout: Rivals: 247Sports: ESPN:					
Overall recruit ranking:
‡ Refers to 40-yard dash; Note: In many cases, Scout, Rivals, 247Sports, On3, and ESPN may conflict in their listings of height, weight and 40 time.; In these cases, the average was taken. ESPN grades are on a 100-point scale.; Sources: "Michigan Football Commitments". Rivals.; "2014 Michigan Football Commits". Scout.; "ESPN". ESPN.; "Scout.com Team Recruiting Rankings". Scout.; "2014 Team Ranking". Rivals.com.

== College career ==
=== 2014–2016 seasons ===
Winovich began his Michigan career as a freshman linebacker, switched to tight end as a sophomore (for new coach Jim Harbaugh) before settling at defensive end in 2016. He wore number 59 as a linebacker and 44 as a tight end (he also practiced at fullback). He did not appear in any games for the 2014 Michigan Wolverines, appeared in 6 for the 2015 Wolverines and appeared in 13, starting 2 at defensive end for the 2016 Wolverines.

=== 2017 season ===
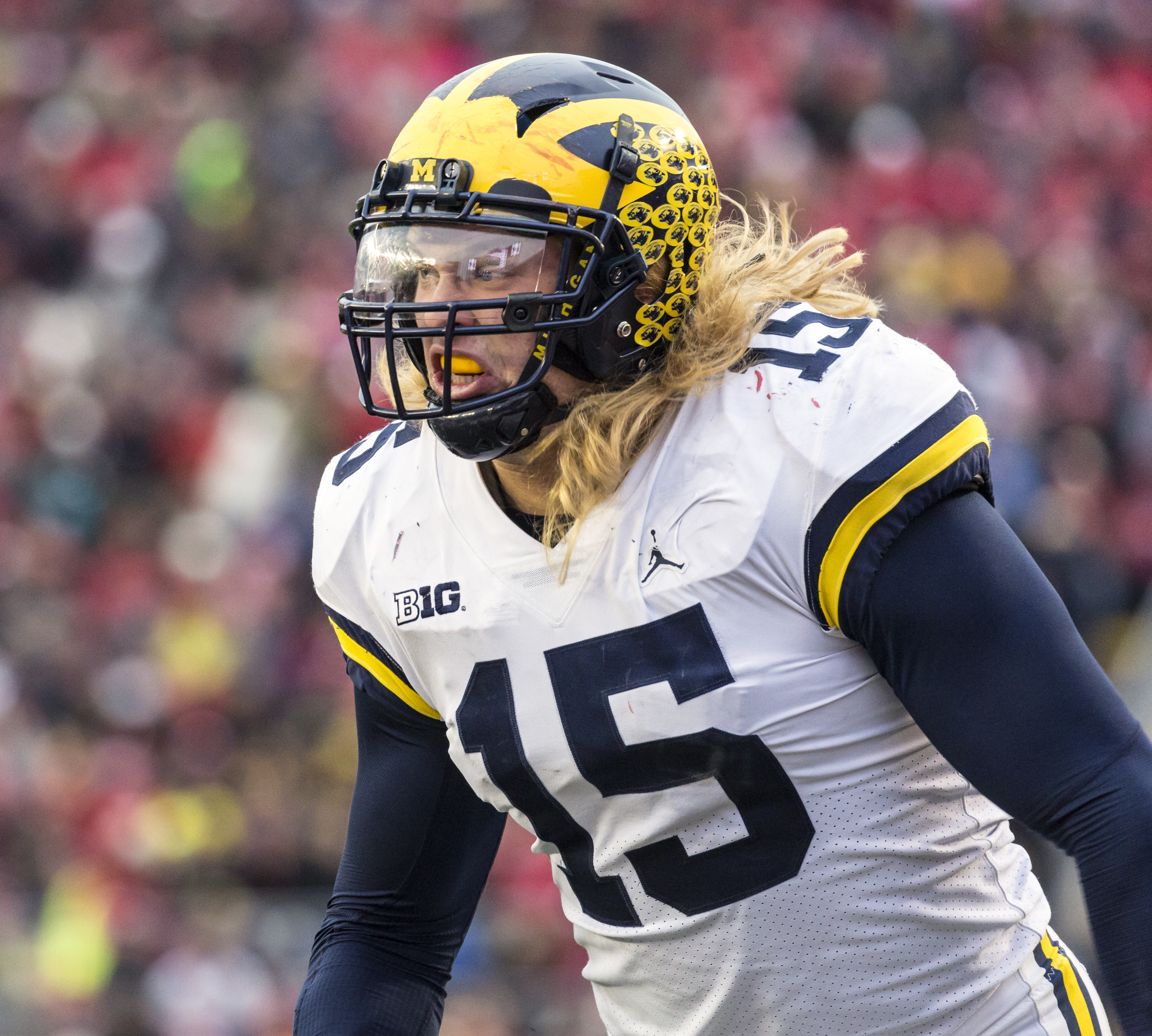
Winovich in 2017

In the spring and summer of 2017, Winovich took ballet lessons in order to improve his ability to shift his weight and control his body. He also studied Ju-jitsu in the summer to improve his agility. On September 23, 2017, Winovich had 4 tackles for a loss, including 3 quarterback sacks against the 2017 Purdue Boilermakers football team, earning Co-Big Ten Conference Defensive Player of the Week. The performance also earned him recognition as the Walter Camp Football Foundation (WCFF) National Defensive Player of the Week (Michigan's 7th such honoree since 2014 and 3rd on defense). During the 2017 season, Winovich set a career high in tackles with 74. Winovich's 17.0 tackles for loss leads Michigan and the Big Ten and ranks tied for 11th in a single season in program history, while his 8.0 sacks are tied for most in the league. Following his redshirt junior season, Winovich earned 2017 All-Big Ten team recognition from the media (first-team) and coaches (second-team). On January 3, 2018 it was announced that Winovich would return for a fifth year at Michigan.

=== 2018 season ===
On October 1, 2018, Winovich earned his second Big Ten Defensive Player of the Week recognition after recording 8 solo tackles and a sack to help Michigan overcome a 17-point deficit against Northwestern. Winovich referred to the Wolverines' 62-39 loss to Ohio State as "a mirage." During the 2018 season, Winovich recorded 62 tackles to rank third among Wolverines and first among defensive linemen, and 14.5 tackles for loss to lead the team. Following the season, he was named to the 2018 All-Big Ten defensive first-team by both the coaches and media. Winovich earned 2018 College Football All-America Team second-team recognition by the WCFF, American Football Coaches Association and College Football News. He earned third-team recognition from the Associated Press.

== Professional career ==
Pre-draft measurables
Height	Weight	Arm length	Hand span	40-yard dash	10-yard split	20-yard shuttle	Three-cone drill	Vertical jump	Broad jump	Bench press	Wonderlic
6 ft 2 3/4 in (1.90 m)	256 lb (116 kg)	32 3/4 in (0.83 m)	10 in (0.25 m)	4.59 s	1.57 s	4.11 s	6.94 s	30.5 in (0.77 m)	9 ft 8 in (2.95 m)	18 reps	31
All values from NFL Combine

=== New England Patriots ===
==== 2019 ====
Winovich was selected by the New England Patriots in the third round (77th overall) of the 2019 NFL draft. On June 4, 2019, he signed a four-year deal worth $3.83 million, with a signing bonus of $997,312.

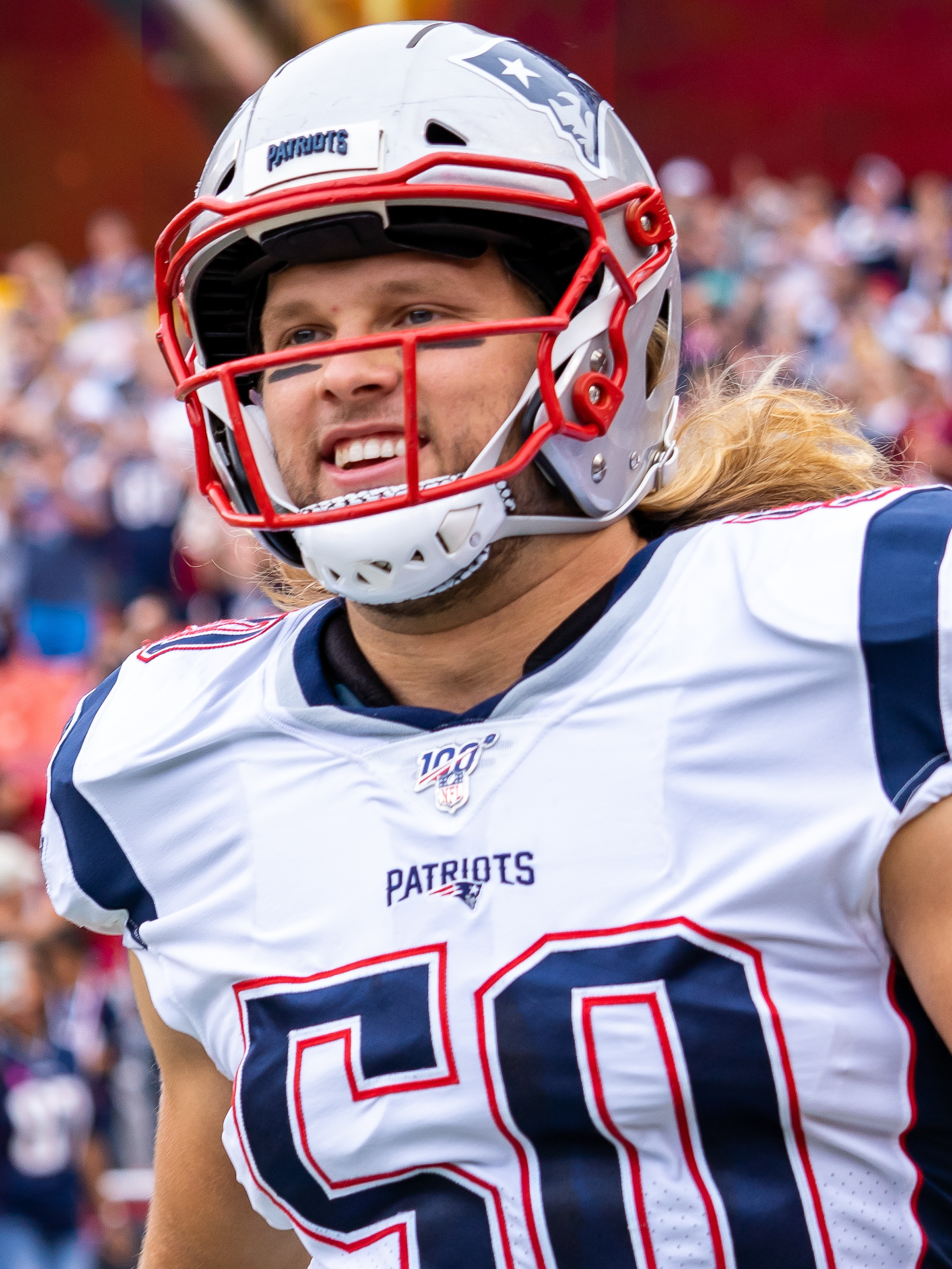
Winovich in 2019

In Week 2 against the Miami Dolphins, Winovich recorded 1.5 sacks as the Patriots won 43–0. For his efforts in that game, he was named Pepsi NFL Rookie of the Week. In Week 5 against the Washington Redskins, Winovich sacked Colt McCoy once in the 33–7 win. The following week, against the New York Giants, he recovered and returned a blocked punt for a touchdown, the first of his NFL career.

==== 2020 ====
In Week 3 against the Las Vegas Raiders, Winovich recorded his first full sack of the season, a strip sack on Derek Carr which was recovered by the Patriots, during the 36–20 win. On October 5, 2020, against the Kansas City Chiefs, he recorded another sack resulting in a fumble from quarterback Patrick Mahomes, despite a controversial blown call from the referees that negated the turnover. Winovich recorded his first career interception off a pass thrown by quarterback Justin Herbert in a Week 13 matchup against the Los Angeles Chargers in the Patriots’ 45–0 shutout. In Week 17 against the New York Jets, he recorded a team-high two sacks on quarterback Sam Darnold in a 28–14 win for the Patriots.

==== 2021 ====
On October 19, 2021, Winovich was placed on injured reserve. He was activated on November 17.

=== Cleveland Browns ===
On March 16, 2022, Winovich was traded to the Cleveland Browns for Mack Wilson. He was placed on injured reserve on September 20. Winovich was activated on November 19.

=== Houston Texans ===
On March 17, 2023, Winovich signed a one-year contract with the Houston Texans. He was released on August 29.

=== Miami Dolphins ===
On August 31, 2023, Winovich was signed to the Dolphins practice squad. On October 7, Winovich was elevated to the active roster to play in a third game that season, filling in for injured teammates such as Jaelan Phillips. He was released on October 17.

On October 24, 2023, Winovich decided to retire from football.

== Career statistics ==
=== NFL ===
Year	Team	Games		Tackles				Interceptions					Fumbles		
Year	Team	GP	GS	Cmb	Solo	Ast	Sck	Int	Yds	Lng	TD	PD	FF	FR	TD
2019	NE	16	0	26	17	9	5.5	0	0	0	0	0	0	1	1
2020	NE	16	9	48	33	15	5.5	1	9	9	0	2	1	0	0
2021	NE	13	0	11	6	5	0.0	0	0	0	0	0	0	0	0
2022	CLE	8	2	20	14	6	1.0	0	0	0	0	1	0	0	0
2023	MIA	3	0	2	1	1	0.0	0	0	0	0	0	0	0	0
Career		56	11	107	71	36	12.0	1	9	9	0	3	1	1	1

=== College ===
Season	Team	GP	Tackles					Interceptions					Fumbles			
Season	Team	GP	Solo	Ast	Cmb	TfL	Sck	Int	Yds	Avg	TD	PD	FF	FR	Yds	TD
2015	Michigan	2	2	0	2	0.0	0.0	0	0	0	0	0	0	0	0	0
2016	Michigan	13	15	17	32	8.5	5.0	0	0	0	0	0	1	0	0	0
2017	Michigan	13	36	37	73	19.0	8.5	0	0	0	0	0	2	2	0	0
2018	Michigan	13	33	26	59	15.5	5.0	0	0	0	0	1	0	1	0	0
Career		41	86	80	166	43.0	18.5	0	0	0	0	1	3	3	0	0

== Personal life ==
Winovich's grandparents moved from Serbia to the United States and changed their last name, Vujinovic ([Serbian Cyrillic: Вујиновић]) to Winovich. Winovich spends his offseasons in Portsmouth, New Hampshire.

=== Philanthropic work ===
Winovich works with Tammi Carr and The ChadTough Foundation to raise awareness of and money for research on diffuse intrinsic pontine glioma (DIPG), an inoperable malignant tumor of the brainstem. (Carr's son, Chad, the grandson of former Michigan head football coach Lloyd Carr, died of DIPG in November 2015 at age 5.)

Since teaming up with The ChadTough Foundation prior to the 2017 Michigan football season, Winovich has worked to increase awareness about DIPG. In December 2017, Winovich and several of his teammates and coaches dyed their hair orange for the 2018 Outback Bowl in order to raise over $200,000 for the ChadTough Foundation. He has also participated in Dancing with the Michigan Stars, which raised over $143,000.
