= John Paul Mone =

Monaghan Gaelic footballer

John Paul Mone is a Gaelic footballer who plays for Clontibret O'Neills. He played at senior level for Monaghan and soldiered with his brother Dessie. He won an Ulster Under 21 medal in 1999. He was part of the 2007 crowd that got to Monaghan's first Ulster final since 1988. Lots of other Mones played with him or around the same time as him too, Conor and Fergal and Rory. John Paul Mone was a selector with Clontibret's senior team in 2020.
