= 2018 Peach Bowl (December) =

College football bowl game

2018 Chick-fil-A Peach Bowl
- CFP New Year's Six; 51st Peach Bowl
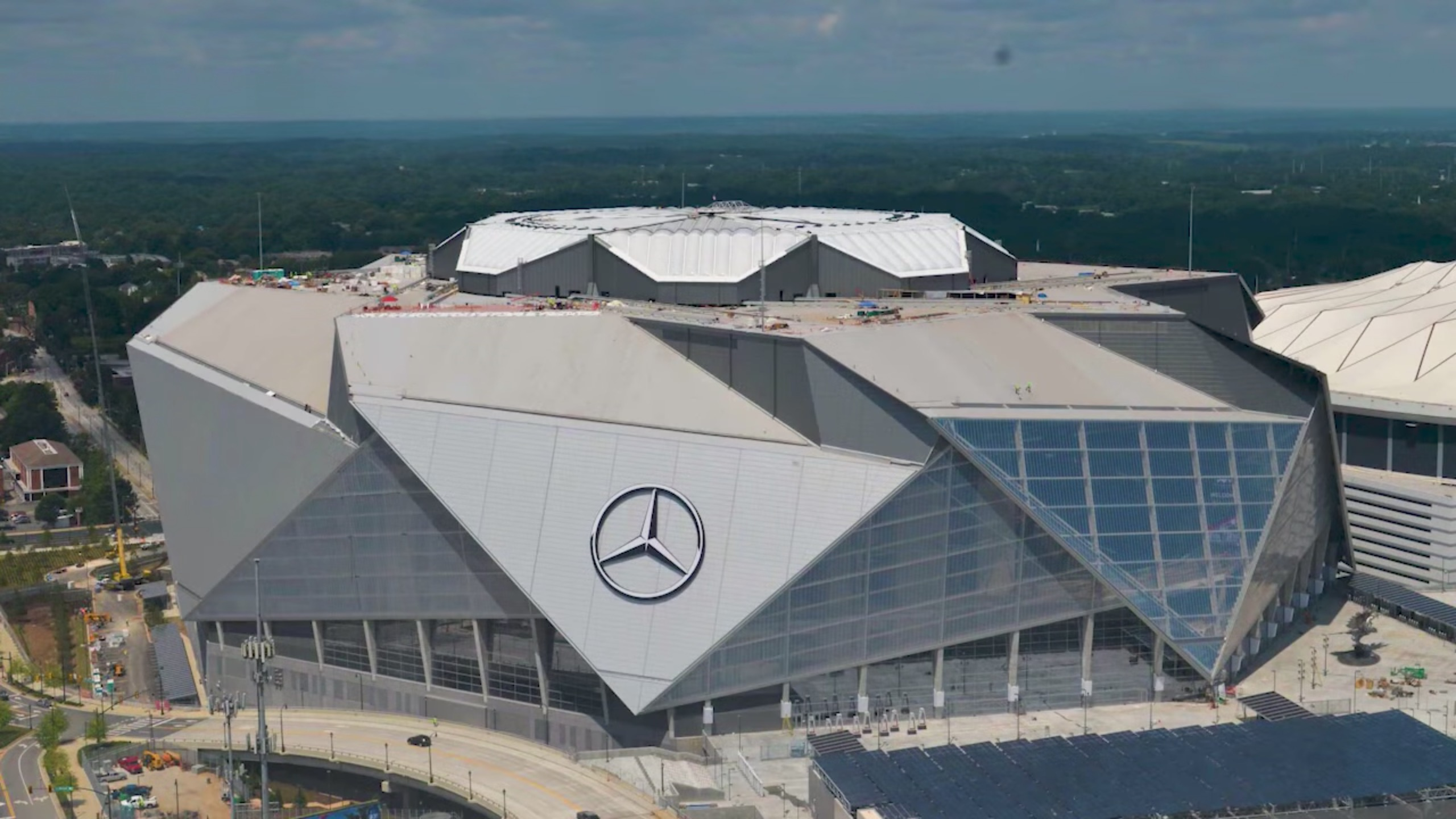
- Mercedes-Benz Stadium in Atlanta, Georgia, hosted the Peach Bowl.
Florida Gators	Michigan Wolverines
(9–3)	(10–2)
SEC	Big Ten
41	15
Head coach: Dan Mullen	Head coach: Jim Harbaugh
AP / Coaches / CFP; 10 / 10 / 10	AP / Coaches / CFP; 8 / 8 / 7
	1	2	3	4	Total
Florida	3	10	14	14	41
Michigan	7	3	0	5	15
- Date: December 29, 2018
- Season: 2018
- Stadium: Mercedes-Benz Stadium
- Location: Atlanta, Georgia
- MVP: Feleipe Franks (QB, Florida); C. J. Gardner-Johnson (DB, Florida)
- Favorite: Michigan by 7.5
- Referee: Mike Defee (Big 12)
- Attendance: 74,006
- Payout: US$4 million to each team

United States TV coverage
- Network: ESPN and ESPN Radio
- Announcers: Bob Wischusen (play-by-play); Brock Huard (analyst); Allison Williams (sideline) (ESPN); Tom Hart, Jordan Rodgers and Cole Cubelic (ESPN Radio)
- Nielsen ratings: 5.3

International TV coverage
- Network: ESPN Deportes
- Announcers: Roger Valdivieso; Alex Pombo

The 2018 Peach Bowl was a college football bowl game played on December 29, 2018. It was the 51st edition of the Peach Bowl, and the second Peach Bowl to be played in Mercedes-Benz Stadium. The game was one of the College Football Playoff New Year's Six bowl games, and one of the 2018–19 bowl games concluding the 2018 FBS football season. Sponsored by the Chick-fil-A restaurant franchise, the game was officially known as the Chick-fil-A Peach Bowl.

The game featured the Florida Gators of the Southeastern Conference and the Michigan Wolverines of the Big Ten Conference. Going in to the bowl, Florida was the highest-ranked team that did not appear in the preseason AP top 25 poll. Michigan's defense had given up an average of 263 yards per game, the best in the nation.

== Teams ==
The game featured the Florida Gators of the Southeastern Conference (SEC) and the Michigan Wolverines of the Big Ten Conference in their fifth meeting against each other. Michigan had won each of its prior games against Florida, most recently in the 2017 Advocare Classic by a score of 33–17.

=== Florida Gators ===
After finishing their regular season with a 9–3 record (5–3 in conference), the Gators were selected to their third Peach Bowl appearance. This was their 44th bowl game appearance.

=== Michigan Wolverines ===
After finishing their regular season with a 10–2 record (8–1 in conference), the Wolverines were selected to their first Peach Bowl appearance. This was their 47th bowl game appearance, tied for 11th-highest total all-time among FBS schools. Several Michigan players, including RB Karan Higdon, DL Rashan Gary, and LB Devin Bush Jr., sat out the game in order to focus on the 2019 NFL draft.

== Game summary ==
=== Scoring summary ===
Scoring summary

Quarter	Time	Drive			Team	Scoring information	Score	
Quarter	Time	Plays	Yards	TOP	Team	Scoring information	FLA	MICH
1	5:37	10	71	3:52	FLA	21-yard field goal by Evan McPherson	3	0
1	2:03	9	75	3:34	MICH	Donovan Peoples-Jones 9-yard touchdown reception from Shea Patterson, Jake Moody kick good	3	7
2	12:22	10	66	4:41	FLA	26-yard field goal by Evan McPherson	6	7
2	5:56	4	0	1:58	MICH	48-yard field goal by Jake Moody	6	10
2	2:41	8	75	3:15	FLA	Feleipe Franks 20-yard touchdown run, Evan McPherson kick good	13	10
3	8:06	6	44	2:43	FLA	La’Mical Perine 5-yard touchdown reception from Feleipe Franks, Evan McPherson kick good	20	10
3	2:34	8	63	4:07	FLA	Jordan Scarlett 1-yard touchdown run, Evan McPherson kick good	27	10
4	12:16	11	67	5:18	MICH	26-yard field goal by Jake Moody	27	13
4	9:21	6	75	2:55	FLA	La’Mical Perine 53-yard touchdown run, Evan McPherson kick good	34	13
4	4:58				MICH	Punt blocked through the back of the end zone, safety	34	15
4	4:43				FLA	Interception returned 30 yards for touchdown by C. J. Gardner-Johnson, Evan McPherson kick good	41	15
"TOP" = time of possession. For other American football terms, see Glossary of American football.							41	15

=== Statistics ===
	1	2	3	4	Total
No. 10 Gators	3	10	14	14	41
No. 7 Wolverines	7	3	0	5	15

Statistics	FLA	MICH
First downs	15	18
Plays–yards	64–427	67–326
Rushes–yards	40–257	30–77
Passing yards	170	249
Passing: comp–att–int	14–24–0	23–37–2
Turnovers		
Time of possession	31:19	28:41

Team	Category	Player	Statistics
Florida	Passing	Feleipe Franks	13/23, 173 yds, 1 TD
Florida	Rushing	La'Mical Perine	6 rec, 76 yds, 1 TD
Florida	Receiving	Van Jefferson	4 rec, 64 yds
Michigan	Passing	Shea Patterson	22/36, 236 yds, 1 TD, 2 INT
Michigan	Rushing	Christian Turner	7 car, 32 yds
Michigan	Receiving	Nico Collins	5 rec, 80 yds

Note: 74,006 was the officially announced attendance figure; "turnstile count" subsequently reported as 68,413.
