= Rory Mone =

Monaghan Gaelic footballer

Rory Mone (born 1977) is a Gaelic footballer who plays for Clontibret O'Neills. He played at senior level for Monaghan's minors, under-21s and seniors then off he went out to Chicago. He would be a brother of John Paul and John Paul is a brother of Dessie.
