= Dessie Mone =

Monaghan Gaelic footballer

Dessie Mone is a Gaelic footballer who plays for Clontibret O'Neills. He played at senior level for Monaghan for 16 years and has a couple of Ulster medals in his back pocket and played in the 2018 All Ireland semi final and soldiered with his brother John Paul. He left the door open in 2020. There are a lot of other Mones too, Conor and Fergal and Rory. Dessie Mone distinguished himself by getting himself an All-Star nom in 2013. He was a manmarker.
