= Ben Mason (American football) =

American football player (born 1999)

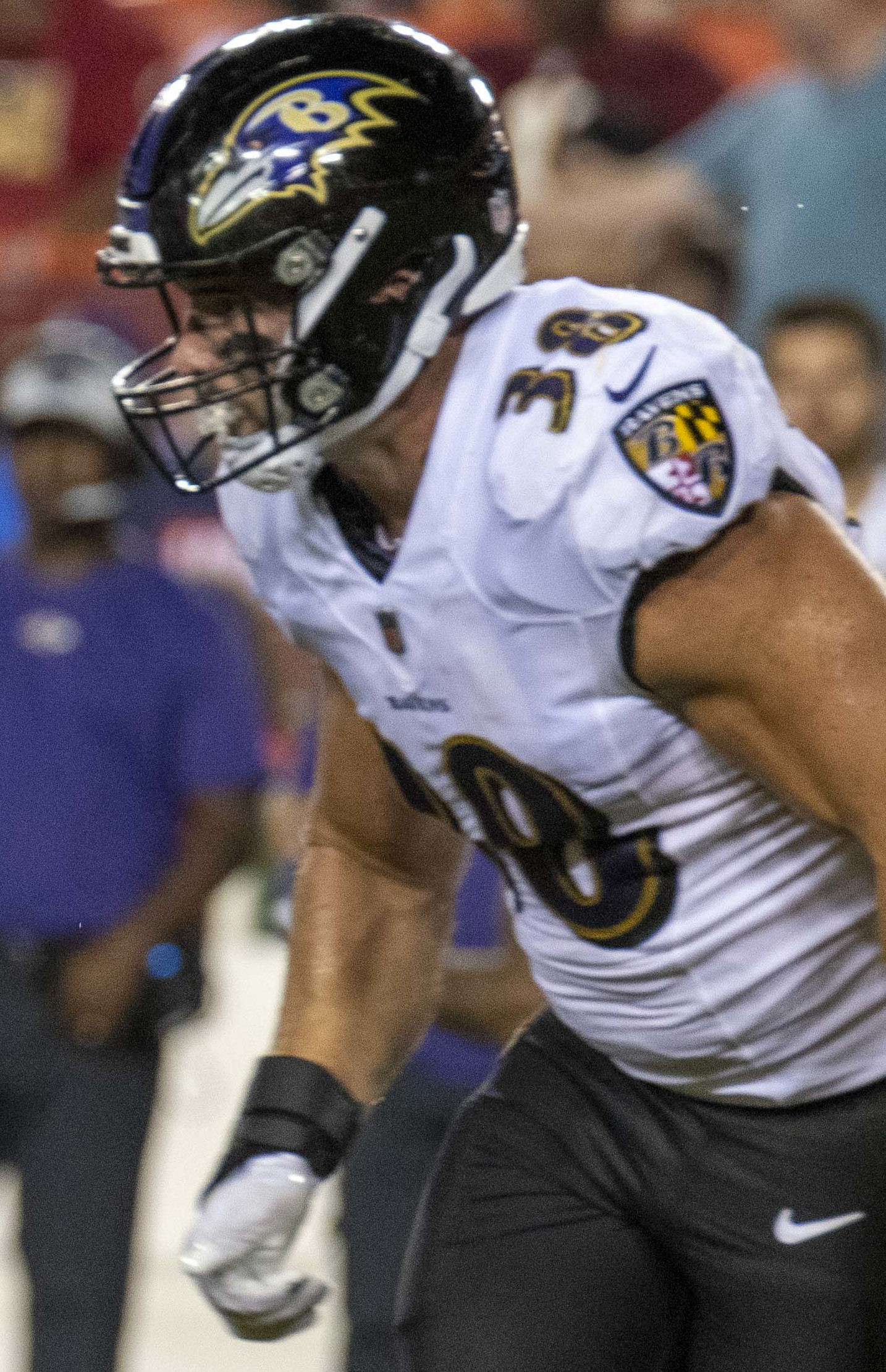
- Mason with the Baltimore Ravens in 2021

Fordham Rams
- Title: Tight ends coach

Personal information
- Born: May 25, 1999 (age 27); Newtown, Connecticut, U.S.
- Listed height: 6 ft 3 in (1.91 m)
- Listed weight: 265 lb (120 kg)

Career information
- High school: Newtown
- College: Michigan (2017–2020)
- NFL draft: 2021: 5th round, 184th overall pick

Career history

Playing
- Baltimore Ravens (2021)*; New England Patriots (2021)*; Chicago Bears (2021)*; Baltimore Ravens (2022–2023); Los Angeles Chargers (2024)*
- * Offseason or practice squad member only

Coaching
- Army (2024) Analyst; Ithaca (2025) Co-special teams coordinator, running backs coach & tight ends coach; Fordham (2026–present) Tight ends coach
- Stats at Pro Football Reference

Ben Robert Mason (born May 25, 1999) is an American college football coach and former professional football fullback and tight end. He is the tight ends coach for the Fordham Rams. He played college football for the Michigan Wolverines, and was selected by the Baltimore Ravens in the fifth round of the 2021 NFL draft.

== Early life ==
Mason was born in Framingham Massachusetts and later moved to Newtown, Connecticut and attended Newtown High School. Mason was named the Connecticut Gatorade Football Player of the Year after rushing for 719 yards and 11 touchdowns with 15 receptions for 188 yards and three touchdowns on offense and recording 63 tackles with two interceptions and two forced fumbles on defense.

== College career ==
Mason played in every game of his freshman season at Michigan on special teams and also rushed for two touchdowns as a fullback. As a sophomore, he saw significant playing time as a fullback and rushed for 80 yards and seven touchdowns on 33 carries with one reception for 15 yards and seven tackles on special teams. He scored three touchdowns in Michigan's 56–10 win over Nebraska to begin conference play. Mason was moved to the defensive tackle position during spring practices and began his junior year as a starter. He was moved back to fullback and tight end one month into the season and was used primarily as a blocker. Mason caught two passes for 17 yards and one touchdown as a senior. Mason won the newfound Lowman Award from Barstool Sports' Pardon My Take podcast as the best fullback in college football.

== Professional career ==
Pre-draft measurables
Height	Weight	Arm length	Hand span	Wingspan	40-yard dash	10-yard split	20-yard split	20-yard shuttle	Three-cone drill	Vertical jump	Broad jump	Bench press
6 ft 2 3/4 in (1.90 m)	246 lb (112 kg)	32 5/8 in (0.83 m)	9 3/8 in (0.24 m)	6 ft 7 in (2.01 m)	4.75 s	1.70 s	2.77 s	4.44 s	6.89 s	37.5 in (0.95 m)	9 ft 9 in (2.97 m)	29 reps
All values from Pro Day

=== Baltimore Ravens (first stint) ===
Mason was selected in the fifth round with the 184th overall pick of the 2021 NFL draft by the Baltimore Ravens. On May 12, 2021, Mason signed with the Ravens. He was waived on August 31, 2021.

=== New England Patriots ===
On September 1, 2021, the New England Patriots signed Mason to their practice squad. He was released on November 8, 2021.

=== Chicago Bears ===
On December 7, 2021, the Chicago Bears signed Mason to their practice squad.

=== Baltimore Ravens (second stint) ===
On January 21, 2022, Mason signed a reserve/future contract with the Ravens. He was waived on August 30, 2022, and signed to the practice squad the next day. He signed a reserve/future contract on January 18, 2023.

On August 29, 2023, Mason was waived by the Ravens and re-signed to the practice squad. He was released from the practice squad on September 26, 2023. On December 20, 2023, Mason was re-signed to the Ravens practice squad. On Saturday January 6, 2024, Mason would make his NFL Debut with the Ravens while playing against the Steelers in week 18 of the NFL Season. Mason played on special teams and recorded no tackles in this game. He was not signed to a reserve/future contract after the season and thus became a free agent when his practice squad contract expired.

=== Los Angeles Chargers ===
On April 2, 2024, Mason signed a contract with the Los Angeles Chargers. He was waived on August 13, 2024.

== Coaching career ==
Mason began his coaching career as an offensive analyst at Army in 2024. After one season he left the Black Knights to become the co-special teams coordinator, running backs coach, and tight ends coach for Ithaca College. Mason was hired as the tight ends coach for the Fordham Rams in 2026.
