= Bryan Mone =

American football player (born 1995)

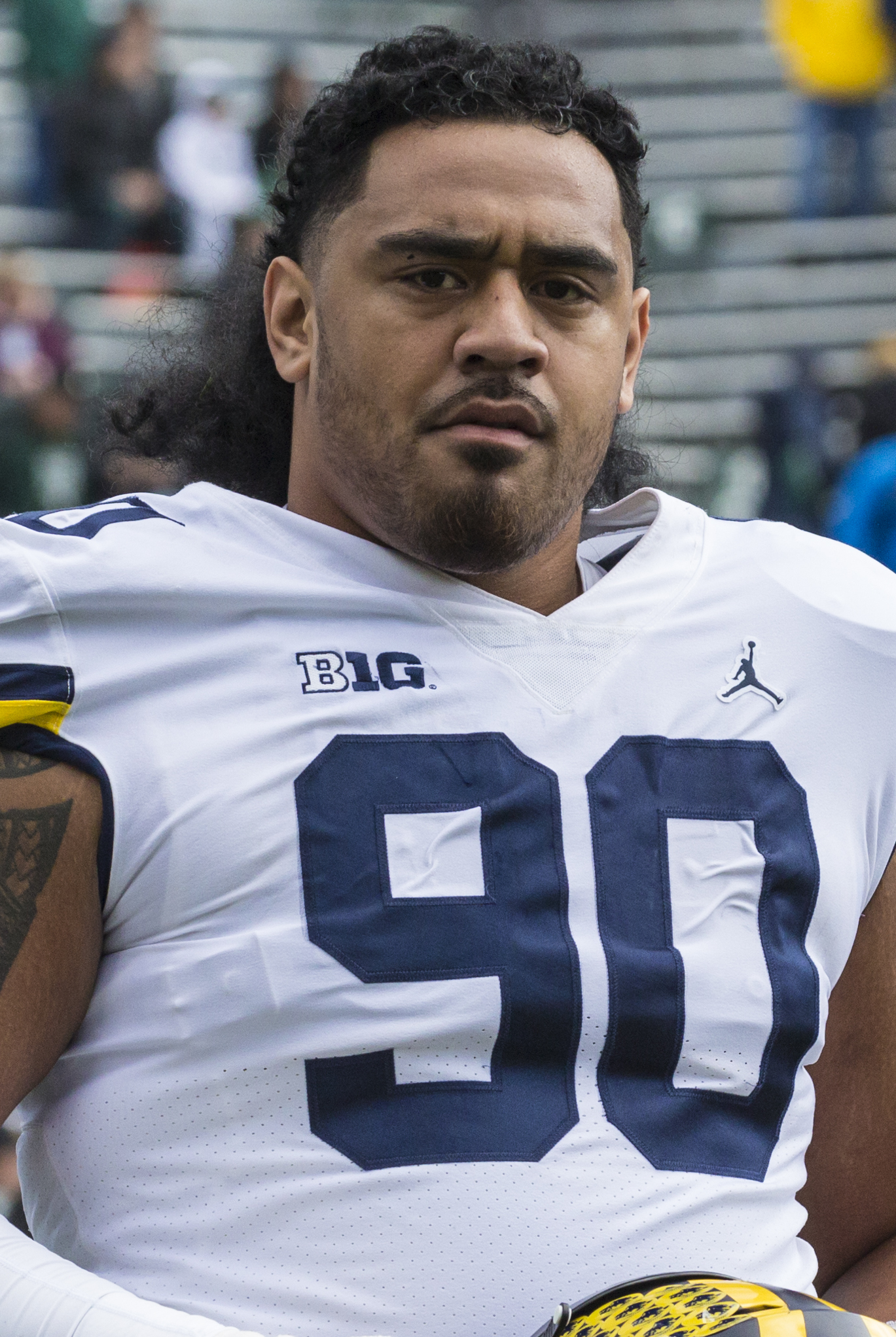
- Mone with the Michigan Wolverines in 2018

Profile
- Position: Nose tackle

Personal information
- Born: October 20, 1995 (age 31); Salt Lake City, Utah, U.S.
- Listed height: 6 ft 3 in (1.91 m)
- Listed weight: 345 lb (156 kg)

Career information
- High school: Highland (Salt Lake City, Utah)
- College: Michigan
- NFL draft: 2019: undrafted

Career history
- Seattle Seahawks (2019–2023); San Antonio Brahmas (2025)*
- * Offseason or practice squad member only

Career NFL statistics as of 2023
- Total tackles: 73
- Sacks: 2.0
- Forced fumbles: 1
- Pass deflections: 2
- Stats at Pro Football Reference

Bryan Mone (born October 20, 1995) is an American professional football nose tackle. He played college football for the Michigan Wolverines. He also played for the Seattle Seahawks of the National Football League (NFL).

== College career ==
Mone was a member of the Michigan Wolverines for five seasons. He played in all 12 of Michigan's games as a true freshman, recording nine tackles (1.5 for loss), but missed his entire sophomore year after breaking his leg in preseason practice. As a fifth-year senior, Mone made 13 tackles (1.5 for loss) with a half a sack was named honorable mention All-Big Ten Conference. Mone finished his collegiate career with 43 tackles, 5.0 tackles for loss, two passes broken up and two fumble recoveries in 48 games played.

== Professional career ==
Pre-draft measurables
Height	Weight	Arm length	Hand span	40-yard dash	10-yard split	20-yard split	20-yard shuttle	Three-cone drill	Vertical jump	Broad jump	Bench press
6 ft 3 in (1.91 m)	366 lb (166 kg)	33 5/8 in (0.85 m)	10 1/2 in (0.27 m)	5.53 s	1.88 s	3.09 s	5.41 s	7.88 s	26.0 in (0.66 m)	8 ft 0 in (2.44 m)	20 reps
All values from Pro Day

=== Seattle Seahawks ===
Mone signed with the Seattle Seahawks as an undrafted free agent on April 28, 2019. Mone made his NFL debut on September 8, 2019, against the Cincinnati Bengals, making three tackles. He was waived on September 26, 2019, and re-signed to the practice squad. He was released on October 23. He was added back to practice squad on October 29. He was promoted to the active roster on December 20.

Mone re-signed with the Seahawks on April 23, 2020. He was placed on injured reserve on November 14, 2020. He was placed on the reserve/COVID-19 list by the team on December 5, 2020, and moved back to injured reserve on December 16. On December 26, 2020, Mone was activated off of injured reserve.

Mone signed an exclusive-rights free agent tender with the Seahawks on April 19, 2021.

On June 20, 2022, Mone signed a two-year contract extension with the Seahawks worth up to $12 million. He suffered a torn ACL in Week 15 and was placed on injured reserve on December 20, 2022. He was placed on the reserve/physically unable to perform list to start the 2023 season.

On March 6, 2024, Mone was released by the Seahawks.

=== San Antonio Brahmas ===
On August 27, 2024, Mone signed with the San Antonio Brahmas of the United Football League (UFL). He was released on March 8, 2025.
