= 2023 Charlotte 49ers football team =

American college football season

2023 Charlotte 49ers football
- Conference: American Athletic Conference
- Record: 3–9 (2–6 AAC)
- Head coach: Biff Poggi (1st season)
- Offensive coordinator: Mike Miller (1st season)
- Offensive scheme: Pro-style
- Defensive coordinator: Ryan Osborn (1st season)
- Base defense: 4–3
- Home stadium: Jerry Richardson Stadium

Uniform
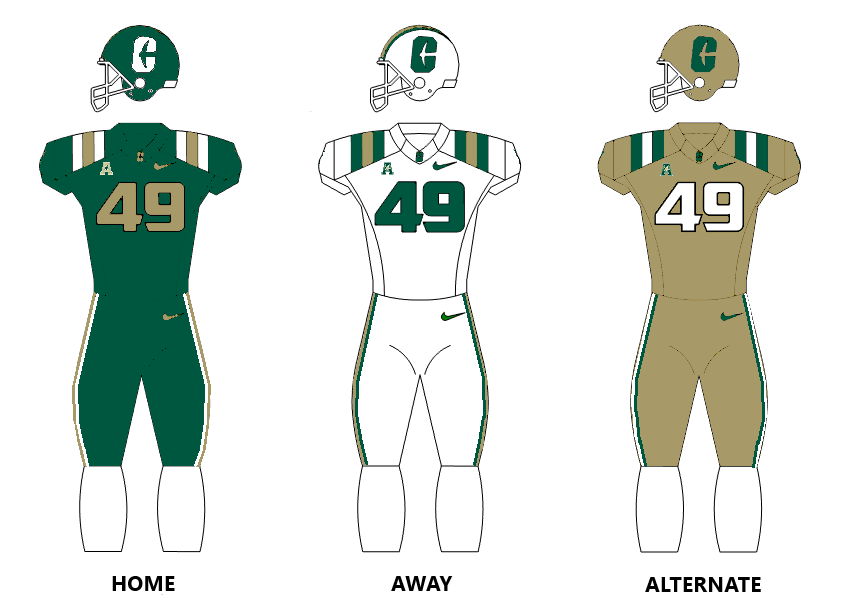

2023 American Athletic Conference football standings
	Conf.			Overall
Team	W		L	W		L
No. 22 SMU y$	8	–	0	11	–	3
Tulane y	8	–	0	11	–	3
UTSA	7	–	1	9	–	4
Memphis	6	–	2	10	–	3
South Florida	4	–	4	7	–	6
Rice	4	–	4	6	–	7
Navy	4	–	4	5	–	7
North Texas	3	–	5	5	–	7
UAB	3	–	5	4	–	8
Florida Atlantic	3	–	5	4	–	8
Charlotte	2	–	6	3	–	9
Tulsa	2	–	6	4	–	8
Temple	1	–	7	3	–	9
East Carolina	1	–	7	2	–	10
Championship: SMU 26, Tulane 14
$ – Conference champion; y – Championship game participant; Rankings from AP Poll

The 2023 Charlotte 49ers football team represented the University of North Carolina at Charlotte in the 2023 NCAA Division I FBS football season. The 49ers played their home games at Jerry Richardson Stadium in Charlotte, North Carolina, and compete in their first season as a member of the American Athletic Conference (AAC). They were led by first-year head coach Biff Poggi. The Charlotte 49ers football team drew an average home attendance of 12,471 in 2023.

== Coaching staff ==
On November 15, Michigan associate head coach Biff Poggi was named the 49ers' third head coach of the modern era. Maryland co-offensive coordinator and tight ends coach Mike Miller was reported to be taking the offensive coordinator and quarterbacks coaching position on November 29. On December 2 Saint Frances Academy defensive line coach Wayne Dorsey took the same position for the 49ers. On November 30 it was reported that Auburn's quarterbacks coach Mike Hartline would become the 49ers wide receivers coach and pass game coordinator. On December 3 it was revealed that Buffalo defensive backs coach Rod Ojong would be accepting the same position at Charlotte. On December 21 Colorado offensive line coach Kyle DeVan accepted the same position on the 49ers staff in addition to being named associate head coach and run game coordinator. On the same date LSU graduate assistant and former Notre Dame team captain Greer Martini was named linebackers coach. On January 5 Michigan Offensive Analyst John Morookian was named tight ends and offensive tackles coach. On the same day Illinois special teams analyst Greg Froelich was named running backs coach and special teams coordinator. On January 11 Texas Southern defensive backs coach Justin Sanders was named safeties coach. On January 16 longtime Poggi friend and business associate Jonathon Jacobson was named assistant head coach and senior advisor. On January 24 Baltimore Ravens defensive assistant Ryan Osborn was named the defensive coordinator and outside linebackers coach, completing the 2023 football staff.

Name	Position	Seasons at Charlotte	Alma mater	Previous
Biff Poggi	Head coach	1	Duke (1984)	Associate head coach (Michigan)
Jonathon Jacobson	Assistant head coach/senior advisor	1	Penn (1984)	Chairman of HighSage Ventures
Kyle DeVan	Associate head coach/offensive line coach/run game coordinator	1	Oregon State (2008)	Offensive line coach (Colorado)
Mike Miller	Offensive coordinator/quarterbacks coach	1	UAB (2014)	Co-offensive coordinator/Tight ends (Maryland)
Ryan Osborn	Defensive coordinator/outside linebackers coach	1	Bridgewater State (2010)	Defensive assistant (Baltimore Ravens)
Wayne Dorsey	Defensive line coach	1	Ole Miss (2018)	Defensive line coach (Saint Frances Academy)
Greg Froelich	Running backs coach/special teams coordinator	1	Michigan (2017)	Special teams analyst (Illinois)
Mike Hartline	Wide receivers coach/passing coordinator	1	Kentucky (2011)	Quarterbacks coach (Auburn)
Greer Martini	Linebackers coach	1	Notre Dame (2018)	Graduate assistant (LSU)
John Morookian	Offensive tackles/Tight ends coach	1	Toledo (2011)	Offensive analyst (Michigan)
Rod Ojong	Defensive backs coach	1	Monmouth (2012)	Defensive backs coach (Buffalo)
Justin Sanders	Safeties coach	1	Illinois (2012)	Defensive backs coach (Texas Southern)

== Recruiting ==
=== Recruiting class ===
The following recruits and transfers have signed letters of intent or verbally committed to the Charlotte 49ers football program for the 2023 recruiting year.

College recruiting (2023)
Name	Hometown	School	Height	Weight	40^{‡}	Commit date
Brian Bates Jr. LB	Hyattsville, MD	DeMatha HS	6 ft 0 in (1.83 m)	225 lb (102 kg)	–	Feb 1, 2023
Brian Bates Jr. LB	Recruit ratings: Rivals:					
Carson Black; QB	Fort Mill, SC	Nation Ford HS	6 ft 2 in (1.88 m)	186 lb (84 kg)	–	Dec 18, 2022
Carson Black; QB	Recruit ratings: Scout: Rivals: 247Sports: ESPN:					
Tymere Burton; LB	Stone Mountain, GA	South Gwinnett HS	6 ft 3 in (1.91 m)	225 lb (102 kg)	–	Feb 1, 2023
Tymere Burton; LB	Recruit ratings: Rivals: ESPN:					
Colin Coates; DL	Baltimore, MD	Saint Frances Academy	6 ft 2 in (1.88 m)	292 lb (132 kg)	–	Jul 26, 2022
Colin Coates; DL	Recruit ratings: Rivals: ESPN:					
Alonso Colvin; S	Baltimore, MD	Saint Frances Academy	6 ft 1 in (1.85 m)	200 lb (91 kg)	–	Dec 19, 2022
Alonso Colvin; S	Recruit ratings: No ratings found					
Kyle Cunanan; K/P	Phoenix, AZ	Sunnyslope HS	5 ft 11 in (1.80 m)	175 lb (79 kg)	–	
Kyle Cunanan; K/P	Recruit ratings: No ratings found					
Ephraim Desse; DL	Marshville, NC	Forest Hills HS	6 ft 3 in (1.91 m)	221 lb (100 kg)	–	Dec 21, 2022
Ephraim Desse; DL	Recruit ratings: Rivals: ESPN:					
Keoni Denny; LB	Riverview, FL	Sumner HS	6 ft 0 in (1.83 m)	225 lb (102 kg)	–	Jun 20, 2022
Keoni Denny; LB	Recruit ratings: Scout: Rivals: 247Sports: ESPN:					
Lakota Dippre; TE	Jermyn, PA	Lakeland HS	6 ft 3 in (1.91 m)	230 lb (100 kg)	–	Dec 21, 2022
Lakota Dippre; TE	Recruit ratings: Rivals: ESPN:					
Dontez Fagan; CB	Independence, KS	Independence Community College	5 ft 11 in (1.80 m)	170 lb (77 kg)	–	Dec 22, 2022
Dontez Fagan; CB	Recruit ratings: Rivals: 247Sports:					
JaQualyn Greene; CB	Arlington, TX	Bowie HS	6 ft 0 in (1.83 m)	195 lb (88 kg)	–	
JaQualyn Greene; CB	Recruit ratings: No ratings found					
Jai'Lun Hampton; OT	Council Bluffs, IA	Iowa Western CC	6 ft 9 in (2.06 m)	320 lb (150 kg)	–	Dec 25, 2022
Jai'Lun Hampton; OT	Recruit ratings: No ratings found					
Kameron Howard; DB	Fort Washington, MD	Saint Frances Academy	6 ft 0 in (1.83 m)	190 lb (86 kg)	–	Dec 21, 2022
Kameron Howard; DB	Recruit ratings: ESPN:					
Dominick Kelley; OT	Waxhaw, NC	Cuthbertson HS	6 ft 5 in (1.96 m)	285 lb (129 kg)	–	Jul 8, 2022
Dominick Kelley; OT	Recruit ratings: Rivals: ESPN:					
TeQuan Latimore; DB	Milledgeville, GA	Georgia Military College	6 ft 2 in (1.88 m)	190 lb (86 kg)	–	Dec 21, 2022
TeQuan Latimore; DB	Recruit ratings: Rivals: ESPN:					
Malik Puryear; DL	Greensboro, NC	Coahoma CC	6 ft 6 in (1.98 m)	250 lb (110 kg)	–	Dec 21, 2022
Malik Puryear; DL	Recruit ratings: Rivals:					
Durell Robinson; RB	Baltimore, MD	Saint Frances Academy	6 ft 0 in (1.83 m)	195 lb (88 kg)	–	Mar 1, 2023
Durell Robinson; RB	Recruit ratings: Scout: Rivals: 247Sports: ESPN:					
Micah Sumpter; OT	Knightdale, NC	Knightdale HS	6 ft 5 in (1.96 m)	275 lb (125 kg)	–	Feb 15, 2022
Micah Sumpter; OT	Recruit ratings: Rivals: ESPN:					
Duane Thomas Jr. ATH	Hollywood, F	Chaminade Madonna Prep	5 ft 10 in (1.78 m)	170 lb (77 kg)	–	Jan 24, 2023
Duane Thomas Jr. ATH	Recruit ratings: Scout: Rivals: 247Sports: ESPN:					
Jonathan Wallace; IOL	Goodman, MS	Holmes CC	6 ft 3 in (1.91 m)	315 lb (143 kg)	–	Dec 21, 2022
Jonathan Wallace; IOL	Recruit ratings: Scout: Rivals: 247Sports:					
P.J. Wilkins; OT	Baltimore, MD	Saint Frances Academy	6 ft 7 in (2.01 m)	335 lb (152 kg)	–	Dec 16, 2022
P.J. Wilkins; OT	Recruit ratings: Rivals: ESPN:					
Overall recruit ranking: Scout: 133 Rivals: NA 247Sports: 133 ESPN: NA
‡ Refers to 40-yard dash; Note: In many cases, Scout, Rivals, 247Sports, On3, and ESPN may conflict in their listings of height, weight and 40 time.; In these cases, the average was taken. ESPN grades are on a 100-point scale.; Sources: "Charlotte Football Commitments". Rivals.; "2023 Charlotte Football Commits". Scout.; "ESPN". ESPN.; "Scout.com Team Recruiting Rankings". Scout.; "2023 Team Ranking". Rivals.com.

=== Key transfers ===
Player	Position	Previous	Home Town	High School	Class	Height	Weight
Andrew Adair	Offensive line	James Madison	Baltimore, MD	Saint Frances Academy	JR	6'-3"	320 lbs
Al-Ma'hi Ali	Defensive back	Saint Francis	Philadelphia, PA	Saint Frances Academy	JR	5'-11"	175 lbs
Dontae Balfour	Corner Back	North Carolina	Starke, FL	Bradford Union Vocational Technical Center	SO	6'-2"	170 lbs
Emmanuel Balogun	Defensive line	Marshall	Fork Union, VA	Saint Frances Academy	JR	6'-7"	267 lbs
Johnathan Bass	Offensive line	Georgia State	Marietta, GA	Kell HS	SR	6'-4"	290 lbs
Joseph Bearns	Tight End	Maryland	Baltimore, MD	Saint Frances Academy	JR	6'-2"	245 lbs
Jaden Bradley	Wide receiver	Pitt	Fayetteville, NC	DeMatha Catholic HS	JR	6'-4"	190 lbs
Terrance Butler	Defensive line	Maryland	Baltimore, MD	Saint Frances Academy	SO	6'-3"	220 lbs
Clinton Burton Jr.	Corner Back	Boston College	Baltimore, MD	Saint Frances Academy	SO	5'-11"	170 lbs
Demon Clowney	Defensive back	Ole Miss	Baltimore, MD	Saint Frances Academy	JR	6'-3"	231 lbs
Nico Crawford	Long snapper	Illinois	Dublin, OH	Dublin Scioto HS	SO	6'-1"	250 lbs
Elijah Culp	Corner Back	Troy	Charlotte, NC	Mallard Creek HS	SR	5'-9"	175 lbs
Jordan Daniels	Offensive line	Akron	Charlotte, NC	North Mecklenburg HS	SO	6'-5"	310 lbs
Osita Ekwonu	Defensive line	Notre Dame	Charlotte, NC	Providence Day	SR	6'-1"	235 lbs
KaTron Evans	Defensive line	Jackson State	Baltimore, MD	Saint Frances Academy	SO	6'-4"	320 lbs
Challen Faamatau	Running Back	Maryland	Honolulu, HI	Farrington HS	SR	5'-10"	213 lbs
Randy Fields	Wide receiver	UT Martin	Elkton, MD	Saint Frances Academy	SO	6'-3"	185 lbs
Austin Fontaine	Offensive line	Maryland	Waldorf, MD	DeMatha Catholic HS	SR	6'-3"	283 lbs
Grant Gonya	Punter	John Carroll	Hudson, OH	Hudson HS	SO	6'-2"	195 lbs
Ja'Khi Green	Offensive line	Maryland	Palmer Park, MD	Saint Frances Academy	SR	6'-5"	310 lbs
Isaiah Hazel	Defensive back	Maryland	Largo, MD	Dr. Henry Wise	SR	6'-1"	205 lbs
Jack Hestra	Wide receiver	Colorado	Cedar Park, TX	Cedar Park HS	SO	6'-0"	180 lbs
Nikhai Hill-Green	Linebacker	Michigan	Baltimore, MD	Saint Frances Academy	JR	6'-1"	231 lbs
Ladaeson DeAndre Hollins	Corner Back	North Carolina	Tampa, FL	Jefferson HS	SR	6'-1"	200 lbs
Greg Hudgins	Linebacker	Purdue	Washington, D.C.	St. John's HS	JR	6'-4"	230 lbs
Andrew Jacobs	Wide receiver	South Dakota	Baltimore, MD	Saint Frances Academy	SO	5'-11"	190 lbs
Austin Johnson	Offensive line	Colorado	Highlands Ranch, CO	Highlands Ranch HS	JR	6'-4"	300 lbs
Jalen Jones	Quarterback	Bethune–Cookman	Richmond, VA	Henrico HS	SR	6'-3"	205 lbs
Terron Kellman	Running back	Northern Illinois	Clinton, MD	Saint Frances Academy	FR	5'-10"	187 lbs
Demetrius Knight	Linebacker	Georgia Tech	Locust Grove, GA	Strong Rock Christian School	JR	6'-2"	247 lbs
Jake Larson	Kicker	Richmond	Baltimore, MD	Saint Frances Academy	SR	5'-11"	165 lbs
Gus McGee	Tight end	San Diego St.	Newburyport, MA	Columbus HS (Miami, FL)	JR	6'-5"	220 lbs
Bennett Meredith	Quarterback	Arizona St.	Birmingham, AL	Hoover HS	SO	6'-3"	190 lbs
Breon Noel	Defensive back	Saint Francis	Baltimore, MD	Saint Frances Academy	FR	5'-11"	190 lbs
Eyabi Okie	Edge	Michigan	Baltimore, MD	Saint Frances Academy	SR	6'-5"	245 lbs
Zion Shockley	Linebacker	Maryland	Berlin, MD	Saint Frances Academy	SO	6'-3"	250 lbs
Sam Thomas	Linebacker	Maine	Baltimore, MD	Saint Frances Academy	JR	6'-0"	224 lbs
Tyler Thomas	Offensive line	Grambling	Baltimore, MD	Saint Frances Academy	JR	6'-4"	290 lbs
Julius Welschof	Defensive line	Michigan	Miesbach, BY	FOS Altoetting (Germany)	SR	6'-6"	288 lbs
Ike White	Wide receiver	Minnesota	Baltimore, MD	Saint Frances Academy	FR	5'-11"	185 lbs
Kevin Williams Jr.	Offensive line	Nebraska	Omaha, NE	Omaha North High School	SR	6'-5"	332 lbs

=== Departing players ===
==== 2023 NFL draft ====
The following players were selected in the 2023 NFL Draft.

Round	Pick	Player	Position	NFL team
7	256	Grant DuBose	WR	Green Bay Packers

==== Outgoing transfers ====
Player	Position	New School
Valerian Agbaw	ATH	None
Donta Armstrong	TE	Campbell
Micah Bell	RB	Mercer
Knox Boyd	OT	Lamar
DJ Brown	LB	None
Jordan Brown	OL	Georgia Tech
Trey Creamer	CB	None
Grant DuBose	WR	Charlotte (Note: DuBose withdrew from the transfer portal before eventually declaring for the NFL Draft.)
James Foster	QB	None
Antonio Gaines	DL	None
Reggie Givhan	WR	None
Aveon Grose	S	None
Jaxon Hughes	Edge	South Carolina
Johnny Martin	RB	Stony Brook
Barutti Mazangu	DT	None
Braeden McAlister	K	Georgia State
Lance McMillan	CB	None
Jordan Moore	DL	None
Miles Posey	LB	Hampton
Isaiah Potts	DL	None
Bailey Rice	P	None
Solomon Rogers	DB	Jackson State
Matt Russo	OT	None
Shyhiem Scotland	LB	None
Darion Smith	DL	Missouri State
Elijah Spencer	WR	Minnesota
Michael Statham	OT	None
Taylor Thompson	TE	James Madison
Trevor Timmons	IOL	Georgia State
BJ Turner	LB	None
Cade White	LB	None
Bryson Whitehead	CB	None
Xavier Williams	QB	UCF

=== Roster ===
2023 Charlotte 49ers football team roster
Players
Coaches
Offense

Pos.	#	Name	Class
RB	0	Terron Kellman	RFr
RB	1	Durell Robinson	Fr
WR	2	Randy Fields	RSr
WR	3	Jaden Bradley	Jr
QB	4	Jalon Jones	Sr
WR	5	Ike White	RFr
QB	6	Dom Shoffner	RSr
QB	7	Steven Johnson	RFr
QB	8	Micah Bowens	RSo
TE	9	Lacota Dippre	Fr
WR	10	Duane Thomas Jr.	Fr
QB	11	Trexler Ivey	RSo
WR	12	Jarius Mack	RSo
RB	13	Shadrick Byrd	RJr
WR	14	Manning Lasso	Fr
WR	15	"Fresh" Walters II	RFr
QB	16	Carson Black	Fr
TE	17	Gus McGee	RSo
TE	18	Colin Weber	RSo
WR	19	Jack Hestera	RSo
WR	20	Xander Lamb	RFr
RB	21	Henry Rutledge	RSo
WR	22	Jack Reynolds	RSo
RB	28	Joachim Bangda	Sr
RB	30	Jaylen Donaldson	RFr
RB	33	Watson Cusick	RFr
TE	35	Joey Bearns III	RSo
RB	38	Hahsaun Wilson	RSo
TE	43	Isaiah Turnage	RSo
OL	50	Ja'Khi Green	RSo
OL	51	Tyler Thomas	Jr
OL	52	Jonny King	RSo
OL	53	Panda Askew	Jr
OL	54	Micah Sumpter	Fr
OL	55	Johnathan Bass	Sr
OL	56	Andrew Adair	RSo
OL	58	Austin Fontaine	RSr
OL	61	Marshall Futrell	RSo
OL	65	Boston Brinkley	RFr
OL	66	Kendall Stanley	RFr
OL	71	P.J. Wilkins	Fr
OL	72	Dominick Kelley	Fr
OL	73	Isaiah Bullerdick	RFr
OL	74	Jordan Daniels	RJr
OL	75	Lucas Gramlick	RSr
OL	76	Kevin Williams	RSr
OL	77	Rene Miller	So
OL	78	Jai'Lun Hampton	So
OL	79	Jasper Parks	Sr
WR	80	Tyreese Schieffer	RSo
TE	81	Jake Clemons	Jr
WR	82	Elisha Edwards	RFr
WR	83	Sean Brown	RSr
WR	84	Malik Baker II	RFr
TE	85	Jason Jeffares	Fr
TE	86	Bryce Kennon	Jr
WR	87	Charlie C. C. Fish	RSo
WR	88	Andrew Jacobs	RFr
WR	89	Quinton Patten	RJr

Defense

Pos.	#	Name	Class
DL	0	Eyabi Okie	RSr
DB	1	Dontae Balfour	So
LB	2	Derek Boykins	Jr
LB	3	Demon Clowney	RSo
DB	4	C.J. Burton	Jr
DB	6	Al-Ma'hi Ali	RSo
DB	7	Damani Dent	RFr
LB	8	Cam Burden	RSo
DB	9	Wayne Jones	RSr
DB	10	Ositadinma Ekwonu	RJr
LB	11	Stone Handy	RJr
DB	12	Dontez Fagan	Jr
DB	13	Isaiah Hazel	Sr
S	14	Steven Parker	RSo
DB	15	DeAndre Hollins	RSr
DB	16	Kameron Howard	Fr
DL	18	Zion Shockley	So
LB	19	T.J. Butler	So
CB	20	Doug Newsome	Jr
DB	21	Breon Noel	So
DB	22	Marcus Robitaille	RSo
DB	23	Izaiah Taylor	Sr
DB	24	Taquan Lattimore	Jr
LB	25	Prince Bemah	RJr
LB	28	Demetrius Knight II	RJr
DB	29	Maguire Neal	So
DL	30	Ephraim Deese	Fr
DB	32	John Anderson	RSo
LB	33	Brian Bates	Fr
DB	35	Elijah Culp	Jr
DB	36	Uriah West	RSo
DB	38	Jamari Broady	RFr
LB	40	Reid Williford	So
LB	41	Nikhai Hill-Green	Jr
DL	42	Emmanuel Balogun	Jr
DB	43	Randy Franklin	RSo
DB	46	Omari Orgertrice	RFr
LB	47	Tymere Burton	Fr
DL	48	Malik Puryear	Jr
DL	51	B.J. Ragland	RSo
DL	53	Michael Kelly	RJr
DL	55	Colin Coates	Fr
DL	62	Katron Evans	RSo
DL	90	Dez Morgan	Jr
DL	91	Larry Avila	RFr
DL	93	Malik Daniels	Jr
DL	94	Jonathan Wallace	So
DE	95	Miguel Jackson	Jr
DL	96	Julius Welschof	RSr
DL	97	Jalar Holley	RJr
DL	99	Isaac Washington	RSo

Special teams

Pos.	#	Name	Class
K	42	Jake Larson	Sr
P	44	Grant Gonya	Sr
LS	45	Nico Crawford	RFr
LS	54	Adam Booker	RFr
K	95	Bronson Long	RFr
K	98	Kyle Cunanan	Fr

Head coach

- Biff Poggi (Duke)

Coordinators/assistant coaches

- Jonathon Jacobson (Penn)
  Assistant head coach/senior advisor
- Kyle DeVan (Oregon State)
  Associate head coach/offensive line/run game coordinator
- Mike Miller (UAB)
  Offensive coordinator/quarterbacks
- Ryan Osborn (Bridgewater State)
  Defensive coordinator/outside linebackers
- Wayne Dorsey (Mississippi)
  Defensive line
- Greg Froelich (Michigan)
  Special teams coordinator/running backs
- Mike Hartline (Kentucky)
  Passing coordinator/Wide Receivers
- Greer Martini (Notre Dame)
  Inside linebackers
- John Morookian (Toledo)
  Offensive tackles/tight ends
- Rod Ojong (Monmouth)
  Defensive backs
- Justin Sanders (Illinois)
  Safeties

Legend

- (C) Team captain
- (S) Suspended
- (I) Ineligible
- Injured
- Redshirt

Roster

=== Depth chart ===
Defense
4–3

FS
Al-Ma’hi Ali
Randy Franklin
Izaiah Taylor

WLB	MLB	SLB
Nikhai Hill-Green	Osita Ekwonu	Prince Bemah
⋅	Derek Boykins	T.J. Butler
⋅	Demetrius Knight II	⋅

SS
Wayne Jones
Steven Parker
Tequan Latimore

CB
DeAndre Hollins
C.J. Burton
Breon Noel

DE	DT	DT	DE
Eyabi Okie	Dez Morgan	Jalar Holley	Julius Welschof
Mike Kelly	Katron Evans	Austin Fontaine	Demon Clowney
Malik Puryear	Jonathan Wallace	Miguel Jackson	Emmanuel Balogun

CB
Dontae Balfour
Dontez Fagan
Elijah Culp

Offense
Pro-style

WR
Jaden Bradley
Ike White
Sean Brown

WR
Jack Hestera
Quinton Patten
Jack Reynolds

LT	LG	C	RG	RT
Kevin Williams	Ja’Khi Green	Andrew Adair	Jonny King	Johnathan Bass
Jordan Daniels	Panda Askew	Tyler Thomas	Rene Miller	Jasper Parks
Jai’Lun Hampton	Kendall Stanley	Isaiah Bullerdick	Boston Brinkley	Lucas Gramlick

TE
Jake Clemons
Gus McGee
Colin Weber

WR
Randy Fields Jr.
Jairus Mack
Andrew Jacobs

QB
Jalon Jones
Micah Bowens
Carson Black

Special teams
PK Jake Larson
PK Kyle Cunanan
P Grant Gonya
KR Shadrick Byrd
PR Henry Rutledge
LS Nico Crawford
H Grant Gonya

RB
Durell Robinson
Shadrick Byrd
Terron Kellman

== Awards and honors ==
=== Preseason ===
Awards Watch List	Player	Position	Year
Hornung Award	Shadrick Byrd	RB	RJR
Wuerffel Trophy	Mike Kelly	DL	JR
2024 Resse's Senior Bowl	Eyabi Okie-Anoma	DE	SR
2024 Reese's Senior Bowl	Julius Welschof	DE	RSR

=== In Season ===
Awards Watch List	Player	Position	Year
CSC Comeback Player of the Year	Nikhai Hill-Green	LB	RSR
Ray Guy Award	Grant Gonya	K/P	SR

Award	Player	Position	Year	Game
AAC Special Teams Player of the Week	Grant Gonya	P	SR	Florida
AAC Defensive Player of the Week	Demetrius Knight II	LB	SR	ECU
AAC Defensive Player of the Week	Nikhai Hill-Green	LB	RSR	Tulsa
PFF Team of the Week	Jasper Parks	LT	SR	FAU
PFF Team of the Week	Hahsaun Wilson	RB	RSO	Memphis

=== Postseason ===
Conference Award	Player	Position	Year
AAC All-Conference First Team	Demetrius Knight II	LB	SR
AAC All-Conference Second Team	Eyabi Okie-Anoma	DE	Grad
AAC All-Conference Third Team	Dontae Balfour	CB	SO
AAC All-Conference Third Team	Nikhai Hill-Green	LB	SR

All Conference Honorable Mentions:

Offense: OL – Kevin Williams, R-Sr.

Special Teams: P – Grant Gonya Sr.

== Schedule ==
Date	Time	Opponent	Site	TV	Result	Attendance
September 2	6:00 p.m.	SC State*	Jerry Richardson Stadium; Charlotte, NC	ESPN+	W 24–3	15,622
September 9	7:30 p.m.	at Maryland*	SECU Stadium; College Park, MD	NBC	L 20–38	32,804
September 16	6:00 p.m.	Georgia State*	Jerry Richardson Stadium; Charlotte, NC	ESPN+	L 25–41	14,410
September 23	7:00 p.m.	at No. 25 Florida*	Ben Hill Griffin Stadium; Gainesville, FL	SECN+/ESPN+	L 7–22	89,053
September 30	7:30 p.m.	at SMU	Gerald J. Ford Stadium; Dallas, TX	ESPNU	L 16–34	25,385
October 14	2:00 p.m.	Navy^{†}	Jerry Richardson Stadium; Charlotte, NC	ESPN+	L 0–14	15,659
October 21	2:00 p.m.	at East Carolina	Dowdy-Ficklen Stadium; Greenville, NC	ESPN+	W 10–7	39,842
October 27	7:30 p.m.	Florida Atlantic	Jerry Richardson Stadium; Charlotte, NC	ESPN2	L 16–38	10,857
November 4	4:00 p.m.	at Tulsa	Skelly Field at H. A. Chapman Stadium; Tulsa, OK	ESPN+	W 33–26 ^{OT}	20,151
November 11	2:00 p.m.	Memphis	Jerry Richardson Stadium; Charlotte, NC	ESPN+	L 38–44 ^{OT}	8,895
November 18	2:00 p.m.	Rice	Jerry Richardson Stadium; Charlotte, NC	ESPN+	L 7–28	9,385
November 25	7:30 p.m.	at South Florida	Raymond James Stadium; Tampa, FL	ESPNU	L 14–48	29,279
*Non-conference game; ^{†}Homecoming; Rankings from AP Poll and CFP Rankings; All times are in Eastern time

== Television ==
Charlotte 49ers home games and conference road games are broadcast through the American Athletics Conference's television partners ESPN, and ABC Sports.

== Radio ==
Radio coverage for all games are broadcast by IMG College through the Charlotte 49ers Radio Network flagship station WZGV ESPN Radio 730 AM The Game, and the TuneIn Charlotte 49ers IMG Sports Network app. The radio announcers are "Voice of the 49ers" Matt Swierad with play-by-play alongside NFL veteran Al Wallace providing color commentary and Bobby Rosinski and Walker Mehl providing sideline reports.

== Preseason poll ==
The American Athletic Conference preseason media poll was released at AAC Media Day on July 25, 2023.

- First place votes in ()

Media poll
Predicted finish	Team	Votes (1st place)
1	Tulane	457 (20)
2	UTSA	440 (9)
3	SMU	397 (3)
4	Memphis	362 (1)
5	Florida Atlantic	312
6	East Carolina	303
7	North Texas	261
8	UAB	209 (1)
9	Navy	199
10	Temple	182
11	Tulsa	160
12	Rice	138
13	South Florida	86
14	Charlotte	64

== Game summaries ==
=== South Carolina State ===
South Carolina State vs Charlotte

Team	1	2	3	4	Total
Bulldogs	0	3	0	0	3
• 49ers	0	17	0	7	24

- Date: September 2
- Location: Jerry Richardson Stadium
  Charlotte, NC
- Game start: 6:03 pm EDT
- Elapsed time: 3:02
- Game attendance: 15,622
- Game weather: 85 °F (29 °C) • Weather: Sunny• Wind: 1 NE MPH
- Referee: Steven Anderson
- TV announcers (ESPN+): James Westling, Jay Sonnhalter

Scoring summary
2	13:53	SCST	Gavyn ZIMMERMAN 42 Yd Field Goal	SCST 3–0
2	9:56	CHAR	Jalon JONES 1 Yd Run (Kyle CUNANAN Kick)	CHAR 7–3
2	4:12	CHAR	Durell ROBINSON 6 Yd Run (Kyle CUNANAN Kick)	CHAR 14–3
2	0:09	CHAR	Kyle CUNANAN 45 Yd Field Goal	CHAR 17–3
4	7:23	CHAR	Bryce KENNON 36 Yd pass from Jalon Jones (Kyle CUNANAN Kick)	CHAR 24–3

Game notes:

- The program's tenth anniversary game.
- 1st meeting between these two programs.
- Biff Poggi's debut as an NCAA FBS head coach.
- First Career NCAA win for Coach Poggi.
- Fewest points allowed since the 2014 season.

Statistics	SCST	CHAR
First downs	8	19
Total yards	168	345
Rushing yards	109	220
Passing yards	59	125
Turnovers	2	1
Time of possession	27:39	32:21

Team	Category	Player	Statistics
SC State	Passing	Andre Washington	6–17, 59 YDS, 1 INT
SC State	Rushing	Kacy Fields	9 CAR, 43 YDS
SC State	Receiving	Jordan Smith	2 REC, 37 YDS
Charlotte	Passing	Jalon Jones	13–19, 125 YDS, 1 TD, 2 INT
Charlotte	Rushing	Durell Robinson	11 CAR, 71 YDS, 1 TD
Charlotte	Receiving	Jack Hestra	4 REC, 49 YDS

=== Maryland ===
Charlotte vs Maryland

Team	1	2	3	4	Total
49ers	14	0	0	6	20
• Terrapins	0	9	8	21	38

- Date: September 9
- Location: SECU Stadium
  College Park, MD
- Game start: 7:37 pm EDT
- Elapsed time: 3:25
- Game attendance: 32,804
- Game weather: 75 °F (24 °C) • Weather: Sunny• Wind: 6 SE MPH
- Referee: Nate Black
- TV announcers (NBC): Noah Eagle, Todd Blackledge, Kathryn Tappen

Scoring summary
1	12:00	CHAR	Jairus MACK 48 Yd pass from Jalon JONES (Kyle CUNANAN Kick)	CHAR 7–0
1	11:50	CHAR	Demetrius KNIGHT II 16 Yd Interception Return (Kyle CUNANAN Kick)	CHAR 14–0
2	11:09	MARY	Jack HOWES 32 Yd Field Goal	CHAR 14–3
2	3:25	MARY	Jack HOWES 38 Yd Field Goal	CHAR 14–6
2	0:00	MARY	Jack HOWES 45 Yd Field Goal	CHAR 14–9
3	9:18	MARY	Billy EDWARDS JR. 1 Yd Run (Taulia TAGOVAILOA Pass to Tai Felton for Two-Point Conversion)	MARY 17–14
4	11:55	MARY	Colby MCDONALD 23 Yd Run (Jack HOWES Kick)	MARY 24–14
4	8:06	MARY	Kaden PRATHER 40 Yd pass from Taulia TAGOVAILOA (Jack HOWES Kick)	MARY 31–14
4	4:35	MARY	Roman HEMBY 15 Yd Run (Jack HOWES Kick)	MARY 38–14
4	1:22	CHAR	Joachim BANGDA 1 Yd Run (Two-Point Pass Conversion Failed)	MARY 38–20

Game notes:

- 2nd meeting in the series since 2022, (UMD 2–0).
- Charlotte's first appearance on OTA national television.
- Charlotte's first game broadcast by NBC.

Statistics	CHAR	UMD
First downs	16	26
Total yards	314	530
Rushing yards	125	243
Passing yards	189	287
Turnovers	2	2
Time of possession	30:17	29:43

Team	Category	Player	Statistics
Charlotte	Passing	Jalon Jones	8–15, 116 YDS, 1 TD, 1 INT
Charlotte	Rushing	Jalon Jones	16 CAR, 67 YDS
Charlotte	Receiving	Jarius Mack	4 REC, 106 YDS, 1 TD
Maryland	Passing	Taulia Tagovailoa	25–36, 287 YDS, 1 TD, 2 INT
Maryland	Rushing	Roman Hemby	20 CAR, 162 YDS, 1 TD
Maryland	Receiving	Kaden Prather	4 REC, 80 YDS, 1 TD

=== Georgia State ===
Georgia State vs Charlotte

Team	1	2	3	4	Total
• Panthers	7	13	14	7	41
49ers	0	10	15	0	25

- Date: September 16
- Location: Jerry Richardson Stadium
  Charlotte, NC
- Game start: 6:02 pm EDT
- Elapsed time: 3:31
- Game attendance: 14,410
- Game weather: 83 °F (28 °C) • Weather: Sunny• Wind: 9 NE MPH
- Referee: Javarro Edwards
- TV announcers (ESPN+): Alex Perlman, Reginald Walker Jr., Smacker Miles

Scoring summary
1	8:44	GAST	Darren GRAINGER 8 Yd Run (Liam RICKMAN Kick)	GAST 7–0
2	15:56	GAST	Liam RICKMAN 26 Yd Field Goal	GAST 10–0
2	13:43	GAST	Robert LEWIS 97 Yd pass from Darren GRAINGER (Liam RICKMAN Kick)	GAST 17–0
2	3:11	CHAR	Kyle CUNANAN 30 Yd Field Goal	GAST 17–3
2	1:00	CHAR	Jack HESTERA 5 Yd pass from Trexler IVEY (Kyle CUNANAN Kick)	GAST 17–10
2	0:00	GAST	Liam RICKMAN 46 Yd Field Goal	GAST 20–10
3	10:23	GAST	Tailique WILLIAMS 78 Yd pass from Darren GRAINGER (Liam RICKMAN Kick)	GAST 27–10
3	3:54	GAST	Marcus CARROLL 1 Yd Run (Liam RICKMAN Kick)	GAST 34–10
3	2:21	CHAR	Jalon JONES 58 Yd Run (Jalon JONES Pass to Colin WEBER for Two-Point Conversion)	GAST 34–18
3	1:30	CHAR	Henry RUTLEDGE 46 Yd Punt Return (Kyle CUNANAN Kick)	GAST 34–25
4	12:57	GAST	Robert LEWIS 38 Yd pass from Darren GRAINGER (Liam RICKMAN Kick)	GAST 41–25

Game notes:

- 5th game in the series since 2015, (Georgia St 3–2).
- Henry Rutledge became the first 49er to return a punt for a touchdown.
- Rutledge also set the school record for longest punt return at 46 yards.

Statistics	GAST	CHAR
First downs	23	18
Total yards	568	356
Rushing yards	102	88
Passing yards	466	268
Turnovers	0	2
Time of possession	31:32	28:28

Team	Category	Player	Statistics
Georgia State	Passing	Darren Grainger	27–33, 466 YDS, 3 TD
Georgia State	Rushing	Marcus Carroll	20 CAR, 67 YDS, 1 TD
Georgia State	Receiving	Robert Lewis	6 REC, 220 YDS, 2 TD
Charlotte	Passing	Trexler Ivey	20–28, 257 YDS, 1 TD, 1 INT
Charlotte	Rushing	Jalon Jones	6 CAR, 80 YDS, 1 TD
Charlotte	Receiving	Jack Hestera	7 REC, 109 YDS, 1 TD

=== at No. 25 Florida ===
Game notes:

- 1st meeting between these two programs.
- Charlotte AD Mike Hill was a long-term member of the Gators athletics department joining in 1993 as a marketing coordinator and rising through various offices up to executive associate AD for external affairs before accepting the top job at Charlotte in 2018.
- Punter Grant Gonya earned AAC Special Teams Player of the week honors with 6 punts in the game, including both a 60-yard and a 58-yard punt.
- Gonya becomes the first 49er to earn an AAC Player of the Week honor since the 49ers joined the AAC.
Game Four – Charlotte 49ers (1–2) at No. 25 Florida Gators (2–1) – Game summary

Quarter	1	2	3	4	Total
Charlotte	0	7	0	0	7
No. 25 Florida	10	6	3	3	22

at Ben Hill Griffin Stadium • Gainesville, Florida

- Date: September 23
- Game time: 7:02 p.m. EDT
- Game weather: Temperature: 84 °F (29 °C) • E at 4 miles per hour (6.4 km/h) • Weather: cloudy
- Game attendance: 89,053
- Referee: Lee Hedrick
- TV announcers (ESPN+/SECN+): Clay Matvick (play-by-play) and Aaron Murray (analyst)
- Boxscore

Game information

First quarter

- (8:26) FLA – Arlis Boardingham 6-yard pass from Graham Mertz (Trey Smack kick) (Drive: 9 plays, 95 yards, 4:27; Florida 7-0)
- (4:14) FLA – Trey Smack 27-yard field goal (Drive: 7 plays, 67 yards, 3:25; Florida 10-0)

Second quarter

- (12:50) FLA – Trey Smack 23-yard field goal (Drive: 10 plays, 91 yards, 4:27; Florida 13-0)
- (8:21) FLA – Trey Smack 54-yard field goal (Drive: 4 plays, -3 yards, 2:49; Florida 16-0)
- (2:30) CLT – Jalon Jones 7-yard run (Kyle Cunanan kick) (Drive: 8 plays, 75 yards, 5:51; Florida 16-7)

Third quarter

- (7:27) FLA – Trey Smack 36-yard field goal (Drive: 9 plays, 46 yards, 4:12; Florida 19-7)

Fourth quarter

- (2:28) FLA – Trey Smack 23-yard field goal (Drive: 5 plays, 34 yards, 1:43; Florida 22-7)

Statistics	CLT	FLA
First downs	10	21
Total yards	53–210	59–395
Rushing yards	28–77	36–136
Passing yards	133	259
Passing: Comp–Att–Int	14–25–0	20–23–0
Time of possession	28:25	31:35

Team	Category	Player	Statistics
Charlotte	Passing	Jalon Jones	11/16, 111 yards
Charlotte	Rushing	Jalon Jones	20 carries, 65 yards, TD
Charlotte	Receiving	Colin Weber	4 receptions, 54 yards
Florida	Passing	Graham Mertz	20/23, 259 yards, TD
Florida	Rushing	Montrell Johnson Jr.	16 carries, 63 yards
Florida	Receiving	Ricky Pearsall	6 receptions, 104 yards

=== SMU ===
Charlotte vs SMU

Team	1	2	3	4	Total
49ers	0	3	6	7	16
• Mustangs	14	3	10	7	34

- Date: September 30
- Location: Gerald J. Ford Stadium
  Dallas, TX
- Game start: 7:35 pm EDT
- Elapsed time: 3:26
- Game attendance: 25,385
- Game weather: 92 °F (33 °C) • Weather: Sunny• Wind: 9 SE MPH
- Referee: Kevin Randall
- TV announcers (ESPNU): John Schriffen, Rocky Boiman, Dawn Davenport

Scoring summary
1	11:41	SMU	Roderick DANIELS JR. 12 Yd pass from Preston Stone (Collin ROGERS Kick)	SMU 7-0
1	4:46	SMU	Jaylan KNIGHTON 1 Yd Run (Collin ROGERS Kick)	SMU 14-0
2	8:20	CHAR	Jake LARSON 21 Yd Field Goal	SMU 14-3
2	3:53	SMU	Collin ROGERS 22 Yd Field Goal	SMU 17-3
3	12:53	SMU	Jaylan KNIGHTON 95 Yd Run (Collin ROGERS Kick)	SMU 24-3
3	7:40	SMU	Collin ROGERS 33 Yd Field Goal	SMU 27-3
3	1:25	CHAR	Jack HESTERA 3 Yd pass from Trexler IVEY (Two-Point Pass Conversion Failed)	SMU 27-9
4	6:23	CHAR	Trexler IVEY 1 Yd Run (Jake LARSON Kick)	SMU 27-16
4	4:18	SMU	RJ Maryland 23 Yd pass from Preston STONE (Collin ROGERS Kick)	SMU 34-16

Game notes:

- Charlotte's first conference game as a member of the AAC.
- 1st meeting between these two programs.

Statistics	CHAR	SMU
First downs	24	20
Total yards	331	363
Rushing yards	167	228
Passing yards	164	135
Turnovers	1	1
Time of possession	35:25	24:35

Team	Category	Player	Statistics
Charlotte	Passing	Trexler Ivey	10–17, 107 YDS, 1 TD, 1 INT
Charlotte	Rushing	Terron Kellman	9 CAR, 69 YDS
Charlotte	Receiving	Jack Hestera	7 REC, 81 YDS, 1 TD
Southern Methodist	Passing	Preston Stone	14–23, 135 YDS, 2 TD, 1 INT
Southern Methodist	Rushing	Jaylan Knighton	11 CAR, 150 YDS, 2 TD
Southern Methodist	Receiving	Jake Bailey	3 REC, 42 YDS

=== Navy ===
Navy vs Charlotte

Team	1	2	3	4	Total
• Midshipmen	0	0	7	7	14
49ers	0	0	0	0	0

- Date: October 14
- Location: Jerry Richardson Stadium
  Charlotte, NC
- Game start: 2:03 pm EDT
- Elapsed time: 3:11
- Game attendance: 15,659
- Game weather: 70 °F (21 °C) • Weather: Cloudy • Wind: 0 MPH
- Referee: Steven Anderson
- TV announcers (ESPN+): Richard Cross, Taylor McHargue, Morgan Uber

Scoring summary
3	12:30	NAVY	Eli HEIDENREICH 69 Yd pass from Braxton WOODSON (Nathan KIRKWOOD Kick)	NAVY 7-0
4	11:02	NAVY	Alex TECZA 62 Yd Run (Nathan KIRKWOOD Kick)	NAVY 14-0

Game notes:

- 1st meeting between these two programs.

Statistics	Navy	CHAR
First downs	10	14
Total yards	265	265
Rushing yards	173	123
Passing yards	92	142
Turnovers	0	3
Time of possession	29:08	30:52

Team	Category	Player	Statistics
Navy	Passing	Braxton Woodson	5–14, 85 YDS, 1 TD
Navy	Rushing	Alex Tecza	6 CAR, 75 YDS, 1 TD
Navy	Receiving	Eli Heidenreich	1 REC, 69 YDS, 1 TD
Charlotte	Passing	Trexler Ivey	11–27, 142 YDS, 2 INT
Charlotte	Rushing	Shadrick Byrd	20 CAR, 92 YDS
Charlotte	Receiving	Duane Thomas Jr.	3 REC, 54 YDS

=== East Carolina ===
Charlotte vs East Carolina

Team	1	2	3	4	Total
• 49ers	3	0	7	0	10
Pirates	0	0	0	7	7

- Date: October 21
- Location: Dowdy-Ficklen Stadium
  Greenville, NC
- Game start: 2:02 pm EDT
- Elapsed time: 3:19
- Game attendance: 39,842
- Game weather: 66 °F (19 °C) • Weather: Sunny • Wind: 14 W MPH
- Referee: Edwin Lee
- TV announcers (ESPN+): James Westling, Leger Douzable

Scoring summary
1	6:38	CHAR	Jake LARSON 35 Yd Field Goal	CHAR 3–0
3	10:12	CHAR	Jalon JONES 1 Yd Run (Jake LARSON Kick)	CHAR 10–0
4	13:14	ECU	Shane CALHOUN 10 Yd pass from Alex FLINN (Andrew CONRAD Kick)	CHAR 10–7

Game notes:

- 1st meeting between these two programs.
- Mike Houston had been offered and accepted in principle to become the 49ers' head coach in late November 2018. The offer was withdrawn on November 30 after it became public that Houston was still considering other options. He subsequently became the Pirates' head coach on December 3. The 49ers went on to hire Will Healy on December 5.
- Poggi's first win over an FBS team, and his and the program's first win over an AAC opponent.
- Senior Linebacker Demetrius Knight II earned AAC Defensive Player of the Week honors with nine tackles, five solo tackles, two tackles for loss and two pass play breakups.
- Knight led an overall defensive team effort to set a new program record for fewest yards allowed with the Pirates only gaining 127 yards in the game.

Statistics	CHAR	ECU
First downs	16	9
Total yards	328	127
Rushing yards	184	39
Passing yards	144	88
Turnovers	2	0
Time of possession	41:15	18:45

Team	Category	Player	Statistics
Charlotte	Passing	Jalon Jones	11–18, 144 YDS, 1 INT
Charlotte	Rushing	Jalon Jones	26 CAR, 127 YDS, 1 TD
Charlotte	Receiving	Colin Weber	1 REC, 40 YDS
East Carolina	Passing	Alex Flinn	11–18, 69 YDS, 1 TD
East Carolina	Rushing	Kamarro Edmonds	2 CAR, 17 YDS
East Carolina	Receiving	Chase Sowell	3 REC, 27 YDS

=== Florida Atlantic ===
Florida Atlantic vs Charlotte

Team	1	2	3	4	Total
• Owls	7	14	10	7	38
49ers	3	3	10	0	16

- Date: October 27
- Location: Jerry Richardson Stadium
  Charlotte, NC
- Game start: 7:35 pm EDT
- Elapsed time: 3:34
- Game attendance: 10,857
- Game weather: 70 °F (21 °C) • Weather: Sunny • Wind: 5 SW MPH
- Referee: Scott Hardin
- TV announcers (ESPN2): Anish Shroff, Andre Ware, Paul Carcaterra

Scoring summary
1	8:46	CHAR	Kyle CUNANAN 36 Yd Field Goal	CHAR 3-0
1	6:53	FAU	Zeke MOORE 3 Yd pass from Daniel RICHARDSON (Carter DAVIS Kick)	FAU 7-3
2	13:15	FAU	LaJohntay WESTER 21 Yd pass from Daniel RICHARDSON (Carter DAVIS Kick)	FAU 14-3
2	8:20	CHAR	Kyle CUNANAN 44 Yd Field Goal	FAU 14-6
2	1:03	FAU	LaJohntay WESTER 26 Yd pass from Daniel RICHARDSON (Carter DAVIS Kick)	FAU 21-6
3	13:46	FAU	Michael JOHNSON JR. 19 Yd Run (Carter DAVIS Kick)	FAU 28-6
3	10:36	CHAR	Jake CLEMONS 10 Yd pass from Trexler IVEY (Kyle CUNANAN Kick)	FAU 28-13
3	6:21	CHAR	Kyle CUNANAN 44 Yd Field Goal	FAU 28-16
3	1:38	FAU	Carter DAVIS 38 Yd Field Goal	FAU 31-16
4	2:12	FAU	Larry MCCAMMON 4 Yd Run (Carter DAVIS Kick)	FAU 38-16

Game notes:

- 9th game in the series since 2015, (FAU 7–2).
- Senior outside lineman Jasper Parks was named PFF's offensive left tackle of the week on their team of the week for week 9.
- Following the game, Coach Poggi suspended an undisclosed number of players for the next game due to their behavior on the field and on the side-lines in this game.

Statistics	FAU	CHAR
First downs	21	22
Total yards	349	325
Rushing yards	131	161
Passing yards	218	164
Turnovers	1	0
Time of possession	21:31	38:29

Team	Category	Player	Statistics
Florida Atlantic	Passing	Daniel Richardson	19–26, 218 YDS, 3 TD, 1 INT
Florida Atlantic	Rushing	Larry McCammon	15 CAR, 67 YDS, 1 TD
Florida Atlantic	Receiving	LaJohntay Wester	10 REC, 149 YDS, 2 TD
Charlotte	Passing	Trexler Ivey	8–15, 68 YDS, 1 TD
Charlotte	Rushing	Terron Kellman	20 CAR, 83 YDS
Charlotte	Receiving	Jake Clemons	2 REC, 28 YDS, 1 TD

=== Tulsa ===
Charlotte vs Tulsa

Team	1	2	3	4	OT	Total
• 49ers	0	10	5	11	7	33
Golden Hurricane	14	3	0	9	0	26

- Date: November 4
- Location: Skelly Field at H. A. Chapman Stadium
  Tulsa, OK
- Game start: 4:02 pm EDT
- Elapsed time: 3:51
- Game attendance: 20,151
- Game weather: 73 °F (23 °C) • Weather: Cloudy • Wind: 7 N MPH
- Referee: Steven Anderson
- TV announcers (ESPN+): Matt Schumacher, LaDarrin McClane

Scoring summary
1	5:54	TULSA	Cardell WILLIAMS 9 Yd Run (Chase MEYER Kick)	TULSA 7-0
1	0:08	TULSA	Cardell WILLIAMS 5 Yd Run (Chase MEYER Kick)	TULSA 14-0
2	11:47	TULSA	Chase MEYER 27 Yd Field Goal	TULSA 17-0
2	4:38	CHAR	Kyle CUNANAN 22 Yd Field Goal	TULSA 17-3
2	0:29	CHAR	Terron KELLMAN 1 Yd Run (Kyle CNANAN Kick)	TULSA 17-10
3	10:14	CHAR	Team Safety	TULSA 17-12
3	0:23	CHAR	Kyle CUNANAN 23 Yd Field Goal	TULSA 17-15
4	10:38	CHAR	Kyle CUNANAN 49 Yd Field Goal	CHAR 18-17
4	5:03	TULSA	Anthony WATKINS 1 Yd Run (Two-Point Run Conversion Failed)	TULSA 23-18
4	0:59	CHAR	Jack HESTERA 18 Yd pass from Trexler IVEY (Trexler IVEY Pass to Colin WEBER for Two-Point Conversion)	CHAR 26-23
4	0:05	TULSA	Chase MEYER 27 Yd Field Goal	TIED 26-26
OT	0:00	CHAR	Trexler IVEY 1 Yd Run (Kyle CUNANAN Kick)	CHAR 33-26

Game notes:

- 1st meeting between these two programs.
- Redshirt Senior Linebacker Nikhai Hill-Green was named AAC Defensive Player of the Week. Hill-Green matched his season high 11 tackles with 2 tackles-for-loss, a forced fumble and a pass break-up.

Statistics	CHAR	Tulsa
First downs	19	21
Total yards	431	412
Rushing yards	154	273
Passing yards	277	139
Turnovers	2	2
Time of possession	30:18	29:42

Team	Category	Player	Statistics
Charlotte	Passing	Trexler Ivey	20–36, 277 YDS, 1 TD
Charlotte	Rushing	Henry Rutledge	4 CAR, 92 YDS
Charlotte	Receiving	Jairus Mack	7 REC, 124 YDS
Tulsa	Passing	Kirk Francis	6–16, 74 YDS, 1 INT
Tulsa	Rushing	Anthony Watkins	24 CAR, 146 YDS, 1 TD
Tulsa	Receiving	Kamdyn Benjamin	5 REC, 46 YDS

=== Memphis ===
Memphis vs Charlotte

Team	1	2	3	4	OT	Total
• Tigers	7	7	7	17	6	44
49ers	0	17	7	14	0	38

- Date: November 11
- Location: Jerry Richardson Stadium
  Charlotte, NC
- Game start: 2:01 pm EST
- Elapsed time: 3:42
- Game attendance: 8,895
- Game weather: 55 °F (13 °C) • Weather: Rain • Wind: 5 N MPH
- Referee: Darryl Deberry
- TV announcers (ESPN+): Richard Cross, Taylor McHargue, Morgan Uber

Scoring summary
1	9:34	MEM	Brandon THOMAS 3 Yd Run (Tanner GILLIS Kick)	MEM 7-0
2	14:54	CHAR	Kyle CUNANAN 40 Yd Field Goal	MEM 7-3
2	9:27	CHAR	Joachim BANGDA 3 Yd Run (Kyle CUNANAN Kick)	CHAR 10-7
2	2:18	CHAR	Hahsaun WILSON 23 Yd Run (Kyle CUNANAN Kick)	CHAR 17-7
2	1:04	MEM	Demeer BLANKUMSEE 35 Yd pass from Seth HENIGAN (Tanner GILLIS Kick)	CHAR 17-14
3	11:28	MEM	Chandler MARTIN 60 Yd Interception Return (Tanner GILLIS Kick)	MEM 21-17
3	8:39	CHAR	Hahsaun WILSON 2 Yd Run (Kyle CUNANAN Kick)	CHAR 24-21
4	10:47	CHAR	Joachim BANGDA 31 Yd Run (Kyle CUNANAN Kick)	CHAR 31-21
4	10:07	MEM	Blake WATSON 6 Yd Run (Tanner GILLIS Kick)	CHAR 31-28
4	7:46	CHAR	Hahsaun WILSON 3 Yd Run (Kyle CUNANAN Kick)	CHAR 38-28
4	5:25	MEM	Blake WATSON 8 Yd pass from Seth HENIGAN (Tanner GILLIS Kick)	CHAR 38-35
4	0:35	MEM	Tanner GILLIS 41 Yd Field Goal	TIED 38-38
OT	0:00	MEM	Blake WATSON 2 Yd Run	MEM 44-38

Game notes:

- 1st meeting between these two programs.
- Charlotte's second overtime game in a row.
- 7th loss of the season removed Charlotte from post-season bowl eligibility.
- Hahsaun Wilson's 3 touchdowns and 198 yards garnered him PFF's running back position on their team of the week for week 11.

Statistics	Memphis	CHAR
First downs	29	19
Total yards	430	391
Rushing yards	101	223
Passing yards	329	168
Turnovers	4	4
Time of possession	28:51	31:09

Team	Category	Player	Statistics
Memphis	Passing	Seth Henigan	32–48, 329 YDS, 2 TD, 1 INT
Memphis	Rushing	Blake Watson	22 CAR, 83 YDS, 2 TD
Memphis	Receiving	Demeer Blankumsee	4 REC, 84 YDS, 1 TD
Charlotte	Passing	Trexler Ivey	14–25, 168 YDS, 4 INT
Charlotte	Rushing	Hasan Wilson	24 CAR, 198 YDS, 3 TD
Charlotte	Receiving	Colin Weber	5 REC, 117 YDS

=== Rice ===
Rice vs Charlotte

Team	1	2	3	4	Total
• Owls	10	3	8	7	28
49ers	0	0	0	7	7

- Date: November 18
- Location: Jerry Richardson Stadium
  Charlotte, NC
- Game start: 2:04 pm EST
- Elapsed time: 3:16
- Game attendance: 9,385
- Game weather: 73 °F (23 °C) • Weather: Sunny • Wind: 10 NE MPH
- Referee: Edwin Lee
- TV announcers (ESPN+): Noah Reed, Reginald Walker Jr.

Scoring summary
1	10:07	RICE	AJ PADGETT 5 Yd Run (Tim HORN Kick)	RICE 7-0
1	0:25	RICE	Tim HORN 23 Yd Field Goal	RICE 10-0
2	4:15	RICE	Tim HORN 37 Yd Field Goal	RICE 13-0
3	11:39	RICE	AJ PADGETT 2 Yd Run (AJ PADGETT Pass to Rawson MACNIELL for Two-Point Conversion)	RICE 21-0
4	10:30	CHAR	Trexler IVEY 12 Yd Run (Jake LARSON Kick)	RICE 21-7
4	3:13	RICE	Luke MCCAFFREY 20 Yd pass from AJ PADGETT (Tim HORN Kick)	RICE 28-7

Game notes:

- 5th game in the series since 2015, (Rice 3–2).

Statistics	Rice	CHAR
First downs	16	11
Total yards	380	158
Rushing yards	240	84
Passing yards	140	74
Turnovers	3	1
Time of possession	33:41	26:19

Team	Category	Player	Statistics
Rice	Passing	A.J. Padgett	13–21, 140YDS, 1 TD, 2 INT
Rice	Rushing	Dean Connors	19 CAR, 184 YDS
Rice	Receiving	Luke McCaffrey	5 REC, 54 YDS, 1 TD
Charlotte	Passing	Trexler Ivey	8–19, 51 YDS
Charlotte	Rushing	Hahsaun Wilson	14 CAR, 47 YDS
Charlotte	Receiving	Randy Fields Jr.	2 REC, 18 YDS

=== South Florida ===
Charlotte vs South Florida

Team	1	2	3	4	Total
49ers	7	0	7	0	14
• Bulls	7	14	20	7	48

- Date: November 25
- Location: Raymond James Stadium
  Tampa, FL
- Game start: 7:36 pm EST
- Elapsed time: 3:19
- Game attendance: 29,279
- Game weather: 70 °F (21 °C) • Weather: Cloudy • Wind: 5 E MPH
- Referee: Nate Black
- TV announcers (ESPNU): Drew Carter, Dustin Fox

Scoring summary
1	10:13	CHAR	Joachim BANGDA 2 Yd Run (Jake LARSON Kick)	CHAR 7-0
1	3:27	USF	Sean ATKINS 10 Yd pass from Byrum BROWN (John CANNON Kick)	TIED 7-7
2	8:07	USF	Kelley JOINER 62 Yd pass from Sean ATKINS (John CANNON Kick)	USF 14-7
2	0:52	USF	Kelley JOINER 4 Yd pass from Byrum BROWN (John CANNON Kick)	USF 21-7
3	14:34	USF	Jaden ALEXIS 60 Yd pass from Byrum BROWN (John CANNON Kick)	USF 28-7
3	12:09	CHAR	Jairus MACK 47 Yd pass from Steven JOHNSON (Jake LARSON Kick)	USF 28-14
3	9:09	USF	John CANNON 22 Yd Field Goal	USF 31-14
3	7:54	USF	Byrum BROWN 35 Yd Run (John CANNON Kick)	USF 38-14
3	2:08	USF	John CANNON 31 Yd Field Goal	USF 41-14
4	12:45	USF	Naiem SIMMONS 1 Yd pass from Byrum BROWN (John CANNON Kick)	USF 48-14

Game notes:

- 1st meeting between these two programs.

Statistics	CHAR	USF
First downs	15	23
Total yards	298	503
Rushing yards	133	188
Passing yards	165	315
Turnovers	3	1
Time of possession	34:23	25:37

Team	Category	Player	Statistics
Charlotte	Passing	Trexler Ivey	13–22, 98 YDS, 2 INT
Charlotte	Rushing	Hahsaun Wilson	16 CAR, 77 YDS
Charlotte	Receiving	Jarius Mack	4 REC, 87 YDS, 1 TD
South Florida	Passing	Byrum Brown	22–30, 253 YDS, 4 TD, 1 INT
South Florida	Rushing	Michel Dukes	15 CAR, 104 YDS
South Florida	Receiving	Kelley Joiner	4 REC, 71 YDS, 2 TD

== Attendance ==
Season	Games	Sellouts	W–L (%)	Attendance	Average	Best
2023	6	2	1–5 (.167)	74,828	12,471	15,659
