= Julius Welschof =

German gridiron football player (born 1997)

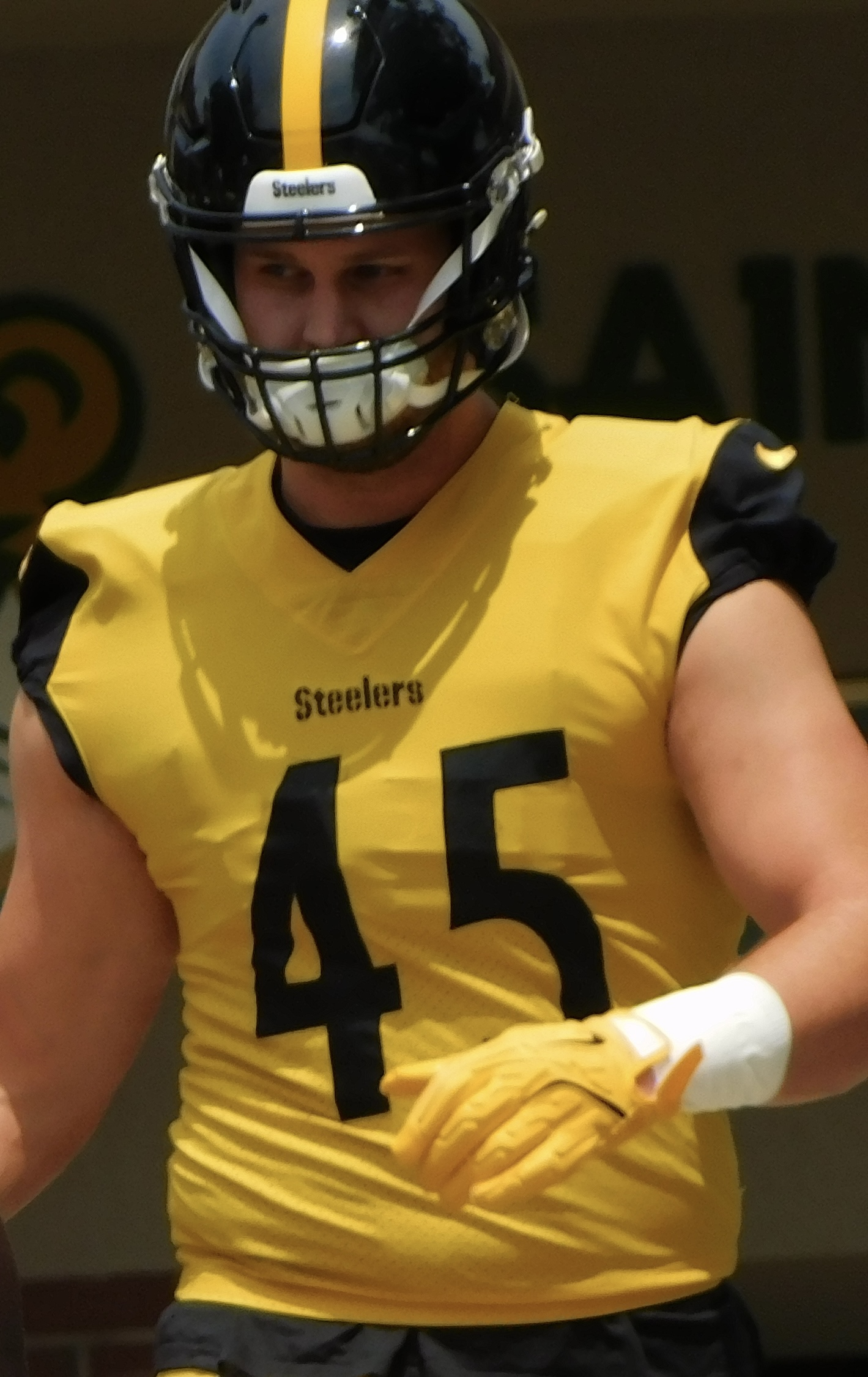
- Welschof with the Pittsburgh Steelers in 2025

No. 45 – Pittsburgh Steelers
- Position: Outside linebacker
- Roster status: Practice squad

Personal information
- Born: March 12, 1997 (age 29); Miesbach, Bavaria, Germany
- Listed height: 6 ft 6 in (1.98 m)
- Listed weight: 265 lb (120 kg)

Career information
- High school: FOS Altoetting
- College: Michigan (2018–2022); Charlotte (2023)
- NFL draft: 2024: undrafted
- CFL draft: 2024G: 2nd round, 13th overall pick

Career history
- Munich Cowboys (2013–2016); Pittsburgh Steelers (2024–present)*
- * Offseason or practice squad member only
- Stats at Pro Football Reference

Julius Welschof (born March 12, 1997) is a German professional American football outside linebacker for the Pittsburgh Steelers of the National Football League (NFL). He played college football for the Michigan Wolverines and Charlotte 49ers.

== Early life ==
Welschof was born on March 12, 1997, in Germany. He grew up in Miesbach, Bavaria, where he won youth championships in skiing. He attended the vocational high school (Fachoberschule, FOS) in Altötting and graduated from there.

After his graduation from high school, Welschof visited the United States in 2013, staying with a friend of his grandfather in Jacksonville, Florida. He was told of American football and received a suggestion that he might be good at the sport, something Welschof initially did not believe, due to being 16 years old at the time and never having played the sport. However, after watching a Jacksonville Jaguars practice, he "was hooked" and, upon returning to Germany, found a local club team, the Munich Cowboys, to play with.

A tight end, Welschof won Bavarian all-star honors in his first season. He later played defensive end as well. After four years at Munich, Welschof decided to try to get an athletic scholarship to play college football in the U.S. He learned of a service run by former Canadian Football League (CFL) player Brandon Collier called Premier Players International, designed to get European players opportunities in college football. Welschof contacted Collier and informed him of his measurements and ability to run a 40-yard dash in 4.5 seconds, then later proved his abilities to a doubtful Collier on a field covered in snow in below-freezing temperatures.

In order to make enough money to attend camps in the U.S., Welschof worked as a manufacturer at a Krones factory and also took on another job renovating a house. Afterwards, he began receiving significant attention and received offers from a number of different programs, being ranked as the 12th-best defensive end recruit and a four-star prospect by 247Sports. He initially committed to play for the Georgia Tech Yellow Jackets, but later flipped to the Michigan Wolverines.

== College career ==
Welschof redshirted as a true freshman at Michigan in 2018 and then appeared in one game during the 2019 season. In 2020, he appeared in all six games and totaled six tackles along with a half-sack. Entering the 2021 season, he was named to Bruce Feldman of The Athletic's "freaks" list, highlighting the most athletic college football players. In 2021, Welschof appeared in all 14 games, one as a starter, and tallied 13 tackles as well as one pass breakup. The following year, he appeared in all 14 games, mainly on special teams, and recorded six tackles, including being named Michigan's special teams player of the week following the game against the Rutgers Scarlet Knights. He entered the NCAA transfer portal following the 2022 season, ending his five-year stint at Michigan having totaled 25 tackles in 35 games played.

Hoping to see more playing time, Welschof transferred to the Charlotte 49ers for his final season of college football in 2023. Joining coaches Biff Poggi and Ryan Osborn, both of whom he worked with at Michigan, Welschof won a starting role with the 49ers. However, he suffered a season-ending shoulder injury four games into the year. He had totaled four tackles in the four games, each of which he started, prior to the injury. He ended his collegiate career with a total of 29 tackles.

== Professional career ==
Pre-draft measurables
Height	Weight	Arm length	Hand span	Wingspan	40-yard dash	10-yard split	20-yard split	20-yard shuttle	Three-cone drill	Vertical jump	Broad jump
6 ft 6 5/8 in (2.00 m)	257 lb (117 kg)	32 1/4 in (0.82 m)	10 1/4 in (0.26 m)	6 ft 7 3/4 in (2.03 m)	4.82 s	1.64 s	2.82 s	4.40 s	7.01 s	32.5 in (0.83 m)	10 ft 3 in (3.12 m)
All values from Pro Day

Welschof returned from his injury in time to participate at the Charlotte pro day in front of National Football League (NFL) scouts, where he recorded a 10 feet 3 inches (3.12 m) broad jump. After not being selected in the 2024 NFL draft, he was signed by the Pittsburgh Steelers as an undrafted free agent to play outside linebacker, being given the Steelers' international roster spot afforded to all teams as part of the International Player Pathway Program (IPPP). He was also chosen in the second round (13th overall) of the 2024 CFL global draft by the Calgary Stampeders. He was placed on injured reserve on August 27, 2024, following a knee injury during a game in 2024 NFL preseason, and waived two days later with an injury settlement. He was re-signed to the practice squad on November 26.

Welschof signed a reserve/future contract on January 14, 2025. Welschof was waived by the Steelers on August 25, and re-signed to the practice squad. On January 14, 2026, he signed a reserve/futures contract with Pittsburgh.

On August 30, 2026, Welschof was waived by the Steelers as a part of final roster cuts; he was re-signed to the team's practice squad the following day.
