= 2023 American Athletic Conference football season =

- League: NCAA Division I Football Bowl Subdivision
- Sport: Football
- Duration: August 26, 2023–December 2, 2023
- Teams: 14
- TV partner(s): ABC, ESPN, ESPN2, ESPNU, and CBS Sports Network

2024 NFL draft
- Top draft pick: Luke McCaffrey, WR, Rice
- Picked by: Washington Commanders, 100th overall

Regular season
- Season champions: Tulane
- Runners-up: SMU

AAC Championship Game
- Champions: SMU
- Runners-up: Tulane
- Finals MVP: Isaiah Nwokobia, S, SMU

Seasons
- ← 2022 2024 →

2023 American Athletic Conference football standings
	Conf.			Overall
Team	W		L	W		L
No. 22 SMU y$	8	–	0	11	–	3
Tulane y	8	–	0	11	–	3
UTSA	7	–	1	9	–	4
Memphis	6	–	2	10	–	3
South Florida	4	–	4	7	–	6
Rice	4	–	4	6	–	7
Navy	4	–	4	5	–	7
North Texas	3	–	5	5	–	7
UAB	3	–	5	4	–	8
Florida Atlantic	3	–	5	4	–	8
Charlotte	2	–	6	3	–	9
Tulsa	2	–	6	4	–	8
Temple	1	–	7	3	–	9
East Carolina	1	–	7	2	–	10
Championship: SMU 26, Tulane 14
$ – Conference champion; y – Championship game participant; Rankings from AP Poll

The 2023 American Athletic Conference football season was the 32nd NCAA Division I FBS Football season of the American Athletic Conference (The American). It was the 11th season since the former Big East Conference dissolved and became the American Athletic Conference and the ninth season of the College Football Playoff in place. The American is considered a member of the Group of Five (G5) together with Conference USA, the MAC, Mountain West Conference and the Sun Belt Conference. The American saw significant realignment prior to the season, with three schools departing the conference and six schools joining. It will be the final season with SMU, who will be leaving to join the Atlantic Coast Conference in the 2024–2025 school year.

== Conference realignment ==
The American Athletic Conference underwent significant realignment before the 2023 season. Three schools, Cincinnati, Houston, and UCF, departed the conference to join the Big 12 Conference, having accepted invitations to join two years prior. The American invited six schools to join the conference, all previously from Conference USA: Charlotte, Florida Atlantic, North Texas, Rice, UAB, and UTSA. The realignment brought The American up to 14 football members for the 2023 season.

This will be SMU's final season in the American before they move to the Atlantic Coast Conference in 2024.

In response to SMU's departure, the American announced the addition of Army as a football-only member beginning in 2024. Army currently competes as an independent and its addition will keep the conference at 14 football members.

== Preseason ==
=== Media days ===
The 2023 American Football Media days were held July 24–25, 2023 at Live! By Loews, Arlington, Texas.

=== Preseason poll ===
The American Athletic Conference preseason media poll was released at AAC Media Day on July 25, 2023.

- First place votes in ()

Media poll
Predicted finish	Team	Votes (1st place)
1	Tulane	457 (20)
2	UTSA	440 (9)
3	SMU	397 (3)
4	Memphis	362 (1)
5	Florida Atlantic	312
6	East Carolina	303
7	North Texas	261
8	UAB	209 (1)
9	Navy	199
10	Temple	182
11	Tulsa	160
12	Rice	138
13	South Florida	86
14	Charlotte	64

== Head coaches ==
=== Changes ===
- On November 15, 2022, Charlotte announced that former Michigan associate head coach Biff Poggi would become their new head coach beginning in 2023, replacing Will Healy, who had been fired mid-season.
- On November 30, 2022, UAB announced that they had hired Trent Dilfer as their permanent head coach, replacing Bryant Vincent, who had been the interim head coach for the entire 2022 season.
- On December 1, 2022, Florida Atlantic announced that Tom Herman would take over as head coach, replacing Willie Taggart.
- On December 4, 2022, South Florida announced that Alex Golesh would become the new permanent head coach starting in 2023 after the school had fired previous head coach Jeff Scott prior to the end of the 2022 season. Golesh was previously the offensive coordinator at Tennessee.
- On December 6, 2022, Tulsa announced that former Ohio State offensive coordinator Kevin Wilson would become the new coach for the team, replacing Philip Montgomery, who had been fired after the season.
- On December 13, 2022, North Texas announced former Washington State offensive coordinator Eric Morris as their new head coach, replacing Seth Littrell who had been fired two weeks prior.
- On December 19, 2022, Brian Newberry was promoted to head coach of Navy after the school declined to renew Ken Niumatalolo's contract. Newberry was the defensive coordinator for the team prior to promotion.

=== Records ===
Team	Head coach	Years at school	Overall record	Record at school	AAC Record
Charlotte	Biff Poggi	1	0–0 (–)	0–0 (–)	0–0 (–)
East Carolina	Mike Houston	5	102–49 (.675)	22–24 (.478)	13–19 (.406)
Florida Atlantic	Tom Herman	1	54–22 (.711)	0–0 (–)	0–0 (–)
Memphis	Ryan Silverfield	4	21–16 (.568)	21–16 (.568)	11–13 (.458)
Navy	Brian Newberry	1	0–0 (–)	0–0 (–)	0–0 (–)
North Texas	Eric Morris	1	24–18 (.571)	0–0 (–)	0–0 (–)
Rice	Mike Bloomgren	6	16–39 (.291)	16–39 (.291)	0–0 (–)
SMU	Rhett Lashlee	2	7–6 (.538)	7–6 (.538)	5–3 (.625)
South Florida	Alex Golesh	1	0–0 (–)	0–0 (–)	0–0 (–)
Temple	Stan Drayton	2	3–9 (.250)	3–9 (.250)	1–7 (.125)
Tulane	Willie Fritz	8	197–114 (.633)	43–45 (.489)	23–33 (.411)
Tulsa	Kevin Wilson	1	26–47 (.356)	0–0 (–)	0–0 (–)
UAB	Trent Dilfer	1	0–0 (–)	0–0 (–)	0–0 (–)
UTSA	Jeff Traylor	4	30–10 (.750)	30–10 (.750)	0–0 (–)

Note:

- Records shown after the 2022 season
- Years at school includes 2023 season

=== Post-season changes ===
- On December 3, 2023, Tulane head coach Willie Fritz resigned from his position to take the head coach position at Houston in the Big 12 Conference for the 2024 season. Offensive coordinator and quarterbacks coach Slade Nagle was named the interim head coach. On December 8, Jon Sumrall was announced as Tulane's new head coach for 2024. Sumrall had previously been the head coach at Troy.

== Rankings ==
		Pre	Wk 1	Wk 2	Wk 3	Wk 4	Wk 5	Wk 6	Wk 7	Wk 8	Wk 9	Wk 10	Wk 11	Wk 12	Wk 13	Wk 14	Final
Charlotte	AP																
Charlotte	C																
Charlotte	CFP	Not released															
East Carolina	AP																
East Carolina	C																
East Carolina	CFP	Not released															
Florida Atlantic	AP																
Florida Atlantic	C																
Florida Atlantic	CFP	Not released															
Memphis	AP														RV		RV
Memphis	C	RV	RV	RV	RV		RV	RV	RV				RV				RV
Memphis	CFP	Not released															
Navy	AP																
Navy	C																
Navy	CFP	Not released															
North Texas	AP																
North Texas	C																
North Texas	CFP	Not released															
Rice	AP																
Rice	C																
Rice	CFP	Not released															
SMU	AP											RV	RV	RV	25	17	22
SMU	C	RV	RV							RV	RV	RV	RV	25	24	19	24
SMU	CFP	Not released														24	
South Florida	AP																
South Florida	C																
South Florida	CFP	Not released															
Temple	AP																
Temple	C																
Temple	CFP	Not released															
Tulane	AP	24	24	RV	RV	RV	RV	RV	23	22	21	20	17	18	17	23	RV
Tulane	C	23	22	RV	RV	RV	RV	RV	24	23	21	20	17	18	18	24	RV
Tulane	CFP	Not released									24	23	24	23	22		
Tulsa	AP																
Tulsa	C																
Tulsa	CFP	Not released															
UAB	AP																
UAB	C																
UAB	CFP	Not released															
UTSA	AP	RV															
UTSA	C	RV	RV											RV			RV
UTSA	CFP	Not released															

== Regular season schedule ==
The 2023 schedule was released on February 21, 2023.

Index to colors and formatting
American member won
American member lost
American teams in **bold**

=== Week 0 ===
Date	Time	Visiting team	Home team	Site	TV	Result	Attendance	Ref.
August 26	2:30 p.m.	**Navy**	No. 13 Notre Dame	Aviva Stadium • Dublin, Ireland (Emerald Isle Classic, rivalry)	NBC	**L** 3–42	49,000	
^{#}Rankings from AP Poll released prior to game. All times are in Eastern Time.

=== Week 1 ===
Date	Time	Visiting team	Home team	Site	TV	Result	Attendance	Ref.
August 31	8:00 p.m.	North Carolina A&T	**UAB**	Protective Stadium • Birmingham, AL	ESPN+	**W** 35–6	25,363	
August 31	8:00 p.m.	Arkansas–Pine Bluff	**Tulsa**	H. A. Chapman Stadium • Tulsa, OK	ESPN+	**W** 42–7	17,529	
September 2	12:00 p.m.	**East Carolina**	No. 2 Michigan	Michigan Stadium • Ann Arbor, MI	Peacock	**L** 3–30	109,480	
September 2	12:00 p.m.	Louisiana Tech	**SMU**	Gerald J. Ford Stadium • University Park, TX	ESPNU	**W** 38–14	21,490	
September 2	2:00 p.m.	Akron	**Temple**	Lincoln Financial Field • Philadelphia, PA	ESPN+	**W** 24–21	12,456	
September 2	3:30 p.m.	**Rice**	No. 11 Texas	Darrell K Royal–Texas Memorial Stadium • Austin, TX (rivalry)	FOX	**L** 10–37	98,017	
September 2	3:30 p.m.	**South Florida**	Western Kentucky	Houchens Industries–L. T. Smith Stadium • Bowling Green, KY	CBSSN	**L** 24–41	15,438	
September 2	4:00 p.m.	California	**North Texas**	DATCU Stadium • Denton, TX	ESPNU	**L** 21–58	21,350	
September 2	6:00 p.m.	South Carolina State	**Charlotte**	Jerry Richardson Stadium • Charlotte, NC	ESPN+	**W** 24–3	15,622	
September 2	6:00 p.m.	Monmouth	**Florida Atlantic**	FAU Stadium • Boca Raton, FL	ESPN+	**W** 42–20	20,893	
September 2	7:00 p.m.	Bethune-Cookman	**Memphis**	Simmons Bank Liberty Stadium • Memphis, TN	ESPN+	**W** 56–14	26,632	
September 2	7:00 p.m.	**UTSA**	Houston	TDECU Stadium • Houston, TX	FS1	**L** 14–17	37,862	
September 2	8:00 p.m.	South Alabama	**No. 24 Tulane**	Yulman Stadium • New Orleans, LA	ESPNU	**W** 37–17	26,973	
^{#}Rankings from AP Poll released prior to game. All times are in Eastern Time.

=== Week 2 ===
Date	Time	Visiting team	Home team	Site	TV	Result	Attendance	Ref.
September 9	3:30 p.m.	Wagner	**Navy**	Navy–Marine Corps Memorial Stadium • Annapolis, MD	CBSSN	**W** 24–0	29,798	
September 9	3:30 p.m.	No. 20 Ole Miss	No. 24 **Tulane**	Yulman Stadium • New Orleans, LA (rivalry)	ESPN2	**L** 20–37	30,000	
September 9	3:30 p.m.	Texas State	**UTSA**	Alamodome • San Antonio, TX (I-35 Rivalry)	ESPN+	**W** 20–13	49,324	
September 9	4:00 p.m.	Marshall	**East Carolina**	Dowdy-Ficklen Stadium • Greenville, NC (rivalry)	ESPNU	**L** 13–31	38,211	
September 9	5:00 p.m.	**Tulsa**	No. 8 Washington	Husky Stadium • Seattle, WA	P12N	**L** 10–43	63,128	
September 9	6:00 p.m.	**UAB**	Georgia Southern	Paulson Stadium • Statesboro, GA	ESPN+	**L** 35–49	20,103	
September 9	6:00 p.m.	Ohio	**Florida Atlantic**	FAU Stadium • Boca Raton, FL	ESPN+	**L** 10–17	17,934	
September 9	6:00 p.m.	**SMU**	No. 18 Oklahoma	Gaylord Family Oklahoma Memorial Stadium • Norman, OK	ESPN+	**L** 11–28	84,186	
September 9	6:30 p.m.	**North Texas**	FIU	Riccardo Silva Stadium • Westchester, FL	ESPN+	**L** 39–46	15,754	
September 9	7:00 p.m.	**Memphis**	Arkansas State	Centennial Bank Stadium • Jonesboro, AR (Paint Bucket Bowl)	ESPN+	**W** 37–3	18,724	
September 9	7:00 p.m.	Houston	**Rice**	Rice Stadium • Houston, TX (rivalry)	NFLN	**W** 43–41 ^{2OT}	23,425	
September 9	7:00 p.m.	No. 23 (FCS) Florida A&M	**South Florida**	Raymond James Stadium • Tampa, FL	ESPN+	**W** 38–24	36,495	
September 9	7:30 p.m.	**Charlotte**	Maryland	SECU Stadium • College Park, MD	NBC	**L** 20–38	32,804	
September 9	7:30 p.m.	**Temple**	Rutgers	SHI Stadium • Piscataway, NJ	BTN	**L** 7–36	45,317	
^{#}Rankings from AP Poll released prior to game. All times are in Eastern Time.

=== Week 3 ===
Date	Time	Visiting team	Home team	Site	TV	Result	Attendance	Ref.
September 14	7:30 p.m.	**Navy**	**Memphis**	Simmons Bank Liberty Stadium • Memphis, TN	ESPN	**MEM** 28–24	25,551	
September 15	7:00 p.m.	Army	**UTSA**	Alamodome • San Antonio, TX	ESPN	**L** 29–37	27,138	
September 16	2:00 p.m.	Norfolk State	**Temple**	Lincoln Financial Field • Philadelphia, PA	ESPN+	**W** 41–9	10,932	
September 16	3:30 p.m.	**East Carolina**	Appalachian State	Kidd Brewer Stadium • Boone, NC	ESPN+	**L** 28–43	40,168	
September 16	3:30 p.m.	No. 10 Alabama	**South Florida**	Raymond James Stadium • Tampa, FL	ABC	**L** 3–17	65,138	
September 16	3:30 p.m.	No. 19 Oklahoma	**Tulsa**	H. A. Chapman Stadium • Tulsa, OK	ESPN2	**L** 17–66	30,855	
September 16	4:00 p.m.	**Tulane**	Southern Miss	M. M. Roberts Stadium • Hattiesburg, MS (Battle for the Bell)	ESPNU	**W** 21–3	25,038	
September 16	6:00 p.m.	Georgia State	**Charlotte**	Jerry Richardson Stadium • Charlotte, NC	ESPN+	**L** 25–41	14,410	
September 16	7:00 p.m.	Louisiana	**UAB**	Protective Stadium • Birmingham, AL	ESPN+	**L** 21–41	21,673	
September 16	7:00 p.m.	**North Texas**	Louisiana Tech	Joe Aillet Stadium • Ruston, LA	ESPN+	**W** 40–37	17,434	
September 16	7:00 p.m.	Texas Southern	**Rice**	Rice Stadium • Houston, TX	ESPN+	**W** 59–7	18,103	
September 16	7:00 p.m.	Prairie View A&M	**SMU**	Gerald J. Ford Stadium • University Park, TX	ESPN+	**W** 69–0	24,489	
September 16	8:00 p.m.	**Florida Atlantic**	Clemson	Memorial Stadium • Clemson, SC	ACCN	**L** 14–48	81,295	
^{#}Rankings from AP Poll released prior to game. All times are in Eastern Time.

=== Week 4 ===
Date	Time	Visiting team	Home team	Site	TV	Result	Attendance	Ref.
September 23	12:00 p.m.	**SMU**	TCU	Amon G. Carter Stadium • Fort Worth, TX (rivlary)	FS1	**L** 17–34	51,243	
September 23	12:00 p.m.	**Tulsa**	Northern Illinois	Huskie Stadium • DeKalb, IL	CBSSN	**W** 22–14	10,321	
September 23	3:30 p.m.	**Florida Atlantic**	Illinois	Memorial Stadium • Champaign, IL	BTN	**L** 17–23	53,512	
September 23	3:30 p.m.	No. 20 Miami (FL)	**Temple**	Lincoln Financial Field • Philadelphia, PA	ESPN2	**L** 7–41	17,234	
September 23	4:00 p.m.	**Rice**	**South Florida**	Raymond James Stadium • Tampa, FL	ESPNU	**USF** 42–29	29,141	
September 23	4:00 p.m.	**UTSA**	No. 23 Tennessee	Neyland Stadium • Knoxville, TN	SECN	**L** 14–45	101,915	
September 23	6:00 p.m.	Gardner-Webb	**East Carolina**	Dowdy-Ficklen Stadium • Greenville, NC	ESPN+	**W** 44–0	40,589	
September 23	7:00 p.m.	**Charlotte**	No. 25 Florida	Ben Hill Griffin Stadium • Gainesville, FL	SECN+/ ESPN+	**L** 7–22	89,053	
September 23	7:00 p.m.	Nicholls	**Tulane**	Yulman Stadium • New Orleans, LA	ESPN+	**W** 36–7	22,842	
September 23	7:30 p.m.	**UAB**	No. 1 Georgia	Sanford Stadium • Athens, GA	ESPN2	**L** 21–49	92,746	
September 23	7:30 p.m.	**Memphis**	Missouri	The Dome at America's Center • St. Louis, MO	ESPNU	**L** 27–34	45,085	
^{#}Rankings from AP Poll released prior to game. All times are in Eastern Time.

=== Week 5 ===
Date	Time	Visiting team	Home team	Site	TV	Result	Attendance	Ref.
September 28	7:30 p.m.	**Temple**	Tulsa	H. A. Chapman Stadium • Tulsa, OK	ESPN	**TLSA** 48–26	17,538	
September 30	12:00 p.m.	**UAB**	Tulane	Yulman Stadium • New Orleans, LA	ESPN2	**TULN** 35–23	20.102	
September 30	3:30 p.m.	**South Florida**	Navy	Navy–Marine Corps Memorial Stadium • Annapolis, MD	CBSSN	**USF** 44–30	29,789	
September 30	4:00 p.m.	Boise State	Memphis	Simmons Bank Liberty Stadium • Memphis, TN	ESPN2	**W** 35–32	30,364	
September 30	7:00 p.m.	Abilene Christian	North Texas	DATCU Stadium • Denton, TX	ESPN+	**W** 45–31	21,494	
September 30	7:00 p.m.	**East Carolina**	Rice	Rice Stadium • Houston, TX	ESPN+	**RICE** 24–17	19,598	
September 30	7:30 p.m.	**Charlotte**	SMU	Gerald J. Ford Stadium • University Park, TX	ESPNU	**SMU** 34–16	25,385	
^{#}Rankings from AP Poll released prior to game. All times are in Eastern Time.

=== Week 6 ===
Date	Time	Visiting team	Home team	Site	TV	Result	Attendance	Ref.
October 7	2:00 p.m.	**UTSA**	**Temple**	Lincoln Financial Field • Philadelphia, PA	ESPN+	**UTSA** 49–34	18,388	
October 7	3:30 p.m.	**North Texas**	**Navy**	Navy–Marine Corps Memorial Stadium • Annapolis, MD	CBSSN	**NAVY** 27–24	28,648	
October 7	4:00 p.m.	**South Florida**	**UAB**	Protective Stadium • Birmingham, AL	ESPN2	**UAB** 56–35	23,792	
October 7	5:00 p.m.	UConn	**Rice**	Rice Stadium • Houston, TX	ESPN+	**L** 31–38	21,207	
October 7	6:00 p.m.	**Tulsa**	**Florida Atlantic**	FAU Stadium • Boca Raton, FL	ESPN+	**FAU** 20–17	21,077	
^{#}Rankings from AP Poll released prior to game. All times are in Eastern Time.

=== Week 7 ===
Date	Time	Visiting team	Home team	Site	TV	Result	Attendance	Ref.
October 12	7:30 p.m.	SMU	East Carolina	Dowdy-Ficklen Stadium • Greenville, NC	ESPN	**SMU** 31–10	33,444	
October 13	7:00 p.m.	Tulane	Memphis	Simmons Bank Liberty Stadium • Memphis, TN	ESPN	**TULN** 31–21	35,609	
October 14	12:00 p.m.	Temple	North Texas	DATCU Stadium • Denton, TX	ESPNU	**UNT** 45–14	13,678	
October 14	2:00 p.m.	Navy	Charlotte	Jerry Richardson Stadium • Charlotte, NC	ESPN+	**NAVY** 14–0	15,659	
October 14	3:30 p.m.	Florida Atlantic	South Florida	Raymond James Stadium • Tampa, FL	ESPN2	**FAU** 56–14	36,670	
October 14	8:00 p.m.	UAB	UTSA	Alamodome • San Antonio, TX	ESPNU	**UTSA** 41–20	23,808	
^{#}Rankings from AP Poll released prior to game. All times are in Eastern Time.

=== Week 8 ===
Date	Time	Visiting team	Home team	Site	TV	Result	Attendance	Ref.
October 19	7:00 p.m.	**Rice**	**Tulsa**	H. A. Chapman Stadium • Tulsa, OK	ESPN2	**RICE** 42–10	18,527	
October 20	7:00 p.m.	**SMU**	**Temple**	Lincoln Financial Field • Philadelphia, PA	ESPN2	**SMU** 55–0	11,232	
October 21	12:00 p.m	No. 22 Air Force	**Navy**	Navy–Marine Corps Memorial Stadium • Annapolis, MD (Commander-in-Chief's Trophy)	CBS	**L** 6–17	38,803	
October 21	12:00 p.m.	**Memphis**	**UAB**	Protective Stadium • Birmingham, AL	ESPN2	**MEM** 45–21	20,269	
October 21	2:00 p.m.	**Charlotte**	**East Carolina**	Dowdy-Ficklen Stadium • Greenville, NC	ESPN+	**CHAR** 10–7	39,842	
October 21	3:30 p.m.	**North Texas**	No. 23 **Tulane**	Yulman Stadium • New Orleans, LA	ESPN2	**TULN** 35–28	30,000	
October 21	3:30 p.m.	**South Florida**	UConn	Rentschler Field • East Hartford, CT	CBSSN	**W** 24–21	21,704	
October 21	6:00 p.m.	**UTSA**	**Florida Atlantic**	FAU Stadium • Boca Raton, FL	ESPN+	**UTSA** 36–10	17,241	
^{#}Rankings from AP Poll released prior to game. All times are in Eastern Time.

=== Week 9 ===
Date	Time	Visiting team	Home team	Site	TV	Result	Attendance	Ref.
October 27	7:30 p.m.	**Florida Atlantic**	**Charlotte**	Jerry Richardson Stadium • Charlotte, NC	ESPN2	**FAU** 38–16	10,857	
October 28	12:00 p.m.	**Tulsa**	**SMU**	Gerald J. Ford Stadium • University Park, TX	ESPNU	**SMU** 69–10	20,800	
October 28	3:00 p.m.	**Memphis**	**North Texas**	DATCU Stadium • Denton, TX	ESPN+	**MEM** 45–42	18,062	
October 28	3:30 p.m.	**East Carolina**	**UTSA**	Alamodome • San Antonio, TX	ESPN+	**UTSA** 41–27	22,629	
October 28	4:00 p.m.	No. 22 **Tulane**	**Rice**	Rice Stadium • Houston, TX	ESPN2	**TULN** 30–28	20,439	
^{#}Rankings from AP Poll released prior to game. All times are in Eastern Time.

=== Week 10 ===
Date	Time	Visiting team	Home team	Site	TV	Result	Attendance	Ref.
November 4	2:00 p.m.	**Navy**	Temple	Lincoln Financial Field • Philadelphia, PA	ESPN+	**TEM** 32–18	13,049	
November 4	3:00 p.m.	**Florida Atlantic**	UAB	Protective Stadium • Birmingham, AL	ESPN+	**UAB** 45–42	20,676	
November 4	3:00 p.m.	**UTSA**	North Texas	DATCU Stadium • Denton, TX	ESPN+	**UTSA** 37–29	17,354	
November 4	3:00 p.m.	**South Florida**	Memphis	Simmons Bank Liberty Stadium • Memphis, TN	ESPN+	**MEM** 59–50	30,223	
November 4	3:30 p.m.	No. 24 **Tulane**	East Carolina	Dowdy-Ficklen Stadium • Greenville, NC	ESPNU	**TULN** 13–10	33,765	
November 4	4:00 p.m.	**Charlotte**	Tulsa	H. A. Chapman Stadium • Tulsa, OK	ESPN+	**CHAR** 33–26 ^{OT}	20,151	
November 4	7:30 p.m.	**SMU**	Rice	Rice Stadium • Houston, TX (rivalry)	ESPNU	**SMU** 36–31	21,632	
^{#}Rankings from College Football Playoff. All times are in Eastern Time.

=== Week 11 ===
Date	Time	Visiting team	Home team	Site	TV	Result	Attendance	Ref.
November 10	9:00 p.m.	North Texas	**SMU**	Gerald J. Ford Stadium • University Park, TX (Safeway Bowl)	ESPN2	**SMU** 45–21	22,043	
November 11	12:00 p.m.	Tulsa	No. 23 **Tulane**	Yulman Stadium • New Orleans, LA	ESPN2	**TULN** 24–22	20,126	
November 11	12:00 p.m.	Temple	**South Florida**	Raymond James Stadium • Tampa, FL	ESPN+	**USF** 27–23	30,938	
November 11	2:00 p.m.	Memphis	**Charlotte**	Jerry Richardson Stadium • Charlotte, NC	ESPN+	**MEM** 44–38 ^{OT}	8,895	
November 11	3:30 p.m.	UAB	**Navy**	Navy–Marine Corps Memorial Stadium • Annapolis, MD	CBSSN	**NAVY** 31–6	29,078	
November 11	4:00 p.m.	East Carolina	**Florida Atlantic**	FAU Stadium • Boca Raton, FL	ESPN+	**ECU** 22–7	-	
November 11	7:30 p.m.	Rice	**UTSA**	Alamodome • San Antonio, TX	ESPNU	**UTSA** 34–14	28,245	
^{#}Rankings from College Football Playoff. All times are in Eastern Time.

=== Week 12 ===
Date	Time	Visiting team	Home team	Site	TV	Result	Attendance	Ref.
November 17	9:00 p.m.	**South Florida**	UTSA	Alamodome • San Antonio, TX	ESPN2	**UTSA** 49–21	22,096	
November 18	12:00 p.m.	No. 24 **Tulane**	Florida Atlantic	FAU Stadium • Boca Raton, FL	ESPN+	**TULN** 24–8	15,871	
November 18	12:00 p.m.	**East Carolina**	Navy	Navy–Marine Corps Memorial Stadium • Annapolis, MD	ESPN+	**NAVY** 10–0	28,708	
November 18	12:00 p.m.	**SMU**	Memphis	Simmons Bank Liberty Stadium • Memphis, TN	ESPN2	**SMU** 38–34	30,313	
November 18	2:00 p.m.	**Rice**	Charlotte	Jerry Richardson Stadium • Charlotte, NC	ESPN+	**RICE** 28–7	9,385	
November 18	3:00 p.m.	**North Texas**	Tulsa	H. A. Chapman Stadium • Tulsa, OK	ESPN+	**UNT** 35–28	16,520	
November 18	3:00 p.m.	**Temple**	UAB	Protective Stadium • Birmingham, AL	ESPN+	**UAB** 34–24	17,486	
^{#}Rankings from College Football Playoff. All times are in Eastern Time.

=== Week 13 ===
Date	Time	Visiting team	Home team	Site	TV	Result	Attendance	Ref.
November 24	12:00 p.m.	Memphis	**Temple**	Lincoln Financial Field • Philadelphia, PA	ESPN	**MEM** 45–21	10,830	
November 24	3:30 p.m.	UTSA	No. 23 **Tulane**	Yulman Stadium • New Orleans, LA	ABC	**TULN** 29–16	25,103	
November 25	12:00 p.m.	Navy	**SMU**	Gerald J. Ford Stadium • University Park, TX (Gansz Trophy)	ESPN2	**SMU** 59–14	21,490	
November 25	1:00 p.m.	Florida Atlantic	**Rice**	Rice Stadium • Houston, TX	ESPN+	**RICE** 24–21	19.393	
November 25	2:00 p.m.	Tulsa	**East Carolina**	Dowdy-Ficklen Stadium • Greenville, NC	ESPN+	**TLSA** 29–27	29,567	
November 25	2:00 p.m.	UAB	**North Texas**	DATCU Stadium • Denton, TX	ESPN+	**UNT** 45–42	14,628	
November 25	7:30 p.m.	Charlotte	**South Florida**	Raymond James Stadium • Tampa, FL	ESPNU	**USF** 48–14	29,279	
^{#}Rankings from College Football Playoff. All times are in Eastern Time.

=== Championship game ===
Date	Time	Visiting team	Home team	Site	TV	Result	Attendance	Ref.
December 2	4:00 p.m.	**SMU**	No. 22 **Tulane**	Yulman Stadium • New Orleans, LA	ABC	**SMU** 26–14	25,206	
^{#}Rankings from College Football Playoff. All times are in Eastern Time.

=== Week 15 ===
Date	Time	Visiting team	Home team	Site	TV	Result	Attendance	Ref.
December 9	3:00 p.m.	**Navy**	Army	Gillette Stadium • Foxborough, MA (124th Army–Navy Game, Commander-in-Chief's Trophy)	CBS	**L** 11–17	65,878	
^{#}Rankings from College Football Playoff. All times are in Eastern Time.

== Postseason ==
=== Bowl games ===
Legend
American win
American loss

Bowl game	Date	Site	Television	Time (EST)	AAC team	Opponent	Score	Attendance
Frisco Bowl	December 19	Toyota Stadium • Frisco, TX	ESPN	9:00 p.m.	UTSA	Marshall	W 35–17	11,215
Boca Raton Bowl	December 21	FAU Stadium • Boca Raton, FL	ESPN	8:00 p.m.	South Florida	Syracuse	W 45–0	20,711
First Responder Bowl	December 26	Gerald J. Ford Stadium • University Park, TX	ESPN	5:30 p.m.	Rice	Texas State	L 21–45	26,542
Military Bowl	December 27	Navy–Marine Corps Memorial Stadium • Annapolis, MD	ESPN	2:00 p.m.	Tulane	Virginia Tech	L 20–41	35,849
Fenway Bowl	December 28	Fenway Park • Boston, MA	ESPN	11:00 a.m.	No. 24 SMU	Boston College	L 14–23	
Liberty Bowl	December 29	Simmons Bank Liberty Stadium • Memphis, TN	ESPN	3:30 p.m.	Memphis	Iowa State	W 36–26	

== Versus other conference records ==
2023–2024 records against non-conference foes:

Power 5 Conferences	Record
ACC	0–2
Big Ten	0–4
Big 12	1–5
Pac-12	0–2
Notre Dame	0–1
SEC	0–6
Power 5 Total	1–20
Other FBS Conferences	Record
C-USA	2–2
Independents (Excluding Notre Dame)	1–3
MAC	2–1
Mountain West	1–1
Sun Belt	4–5
Other FBS Total	10–12
FCS Opponents	Record
Football Championship Subdivision	13–0
Total Non-Conference Record	24–32

Postseason

Power Five Conferences	Record
ACC	1-2
Big 12	1–0
Big Ten	0–0
Notre Dame	0–0
Pac-12	0–0
SEC	0–0
Power 5 Total	2–2
Other FBS Conferences	Record
C-USA	0–0
Independents (Excluding Notre Dame)	0–0
MAC	0–0
Mountain West	0–0
Sun Belt	1–1
Other FBS Total	1–1
Total Bowl Record	3-3

=== Power 5 matchups ===
This is a list of games the American has scheduled versus power conference teams (ACC, Big 10, Big 12, Pac-12, Notre Dame and SEC). All rankings are from the current AP Poll at the time of the game.

Date	Conference	Visitor	Home	Site	Score
August 26	Independent	Navy	No. 13 Notre Dame	Aviva Stadium • Dublin, Ireland	L 3–42
September 2	Big Ten	East Carolina	No. 2 Michigan	Michigan Stadium • Ann Arbor, MI	L 3–30
September 2	Pac-12	California	North Texas	DATCU Stadium • Denton, TX	L 21–58
September 2	Big 12	Rice	No. 11 Texas	Darrell K Royal–Texas Memorial Stadium • Austin, TX	L 10–37
September 2	Big 12	UTSA	Houston	TDECU Stadium • Houston, TX	L 14–17
September 9	Big Ten	Charlotte	Maryland	SECU Stadium • College Park, MD	L 20–38
September 9	Big 12	Houston	Rice	Rice Stadium • Houston, TX	W 43–41 ^{2OT}
September 9	Big 12	SMU	No. 18 Oklahoma	Gaylord Family Oklahoma Memorial Stadium • Norman, OK	L 11–28
September 9	Big Ten	Temple	Rutgers	SHI Stadium • Piscataway, NJ	L 7–36
September 9	SEC	No. 20 Ole Miss	No. 24 Tulane	Yulman Stadium • New Orleans, LA	L 20–37
September 9	Pac-12	Tulsa	No. 8 Washington	Husky Stadium • Seattle, WA	L 10–43
September 16	ACC	Florida Atlantic	Clemson	Memorial Stadium • Clemson, SC	L 14–48
September 16	SEC	No. 10 Alabama	South Florida	Raymond James Stadium • Tampa, FL	L 3–17
September 16	Big 12	No. 19 Oklahoma	Tulsa	H. A. Chapman Stadium • Tulsa, OK	L 17–66
September 23	SEC	UAB	No. 1 Georgia	Sanford Stadium • Athens, GA	L 21–49
September 23	SEC	Charlotte	No. 25 Florida	Ben Hill Griffin Stadium • Gainesville, FL	L 7–22
September 23	Big Ten	Florida Atlantic	Illinois	Memorial Stadium • Champaign, IL	L 17–23
September 23	SEC	Memphis	Missouri	The Dome at America's Center • St. Louis, MO	L 27–34
September 23	Big 12	SMU	TCU	Amon G. Carter Stadium • Fort Worth, TX	L 17–34
September 23	ACC	No. 20 Miami (FL)	Temple	Lincoln Financial Field • Philadelphia, PA	L 7–41
September 23	SEC	UTSA	No. 23 Tennessee	Neyland Stadium • Knoxville, TN	L 14–45

=== Group of Five matchups ===
The following games include American Athletic Conference teams competing against teams from C-USA, the MAC, Mountain West, or Sun Belt.

Date	Conference	Visitor	Home	Site	Score
September 2	C-USA	South Florida	Western Kentucky	Houchens Industries–L. T. Smith Stadium • Bowling Green, KY	L 24–41
September 2	C-USA	Louisiana Tech	SMU	Gerald J. Ford Stadium • University Park, TX	W 38–14
September 2	MAC	Akron	Temple	Lincoln Financial Field • Philadelphia, PA	W 24–21
September 2	Sun Belt	South Alabama	No. 24 Tulane	Yulman Stadium • New Orleans, LA	W 37–17
September 9	Sun Belt	UAB	Georgia Southern	Paulson Stadium • Statesboro, GA	L 35–49
September 9	Sun Belt	Marshall	East Carolina	Dowdy-Ficklen Stadium • Greenville, NC	L 13–31
September 9	MAC	Ohio	Florida Atlantic	FAU Stadium • Boca Raton, FL	L 10–17
September 9	Sun Belt	Memphis	Arkansas State	Centennial Bank Stadium • Jonesboro, AR	W 37–3
September 9	C-USA	North Texas	FIU	Riccardo Silva Stadium • Westchester, FL	L 39–46
September 9	Sun Belt	Texas State	UTSA	Alamodome • San Antonio, TX	W 20–13
September 16	Sun Belt	Louisiana	UAB	Protective Stadium • Birmingham, AL	L 21–41
September 16	Sun Belt	Georgia State	Charlotte	Jerry Richardson Stadium • Charlotte, NC	L 25–41
September 16	Sun Belt	East Carolina	Appalachian State	Kidd Brewer Stadium • Boone, NC	L 28–43
September 16	C-USA	North Texas	Louisiana Tech	Joe Aillet Stadium • Ruston, LA	W 40–37
September 16	Sun Belt	Tulane	Southern Miss	M. M. Roberts Stadium • Hattiesburg, MS	W 21–3
September 23	MAC	Tulsa	Northern Illinois	Huskie Stadium • DeKalb, IL	W 22–14
September 30	Mountain West	Boise State	Memphis	Simmons Bank Liberty Stadium • Memphis, TN	W 35–32
October 21	Mountain West	No. 22 Air Force	Navy	Navy–Marine Corps Memorial Stadium • Annapolis, MD	L 6–17

=== FBS independents matchups ===
The following games include AAC teams competing against FBS Independents, which includes Army, UConn, or UMass.

Date	Visitor	Home	Site	Score
September 15	Army	UTSA	Alamodome • San Antonio, TX	L 29–37
October 7	UConn	Rice	Rice Stadium • Houston, TX	L 31–38
October 21	South Florida	UConn	Rentschler Field • East Hartford, CT	W 24–21
December 9	Navy	Army	Gillette Stadium • Foxborough, MA	L 11–17

=== FCS matchups ===
Date	Visitor	Home	Site	Score
August 31	North Carolina A&T	UAB	Protective Stadium • Birmingham, AL	W 35–6
August 31	Arkansas-Pine Bluff	Tulsa	H. A. Chapman Stadium • Tulsa, OK	W 42–7
September 2	South Carolina State	Charlotte	Jerry Richardson Stadium • Charlotte, NC	W 24–3
September 2	Monmouth	Florida Atlantic	FAU Stadium • Boca Raton, FL	W 42–20
September 2	Bethune-Cookman	Memphis	Simmons Bank Liberty Stadium • Memphis, TN	W 56–14
September 9	Wagner	Navy	Navy–Marine Corps Memorial Stadium • Annapolis, MD	W 24–0
September 9	No. 23 (FCS) Florida A&M	South Florida	Raymond James Stadium • Tampa, FL	W 38–24
September 16	Texas Southern	Rice	Rice Stadium • Houston, TX	W 59–7
September 16	Prairie View A&M	SMU	Gerald J. Ford Stadium • University Park, TX	W 69–0
September 16	Norfolk State	Temple	Lincoln Financial Field • Philadelphia, PA	W 41–9
September 23	Gardner-Webb	East Carolina	Dowdy-Ficklen Stadium • Greenville, NC	W 44–0
September 23	Nicholls	Tulane	Yulman Stadium • New Orleans, LA	W 36–7
September 30	Abilene Christian	North Texas	DATCU Stadium • Denton, TX	W 45–31

== Awards and honors ==
=== Player of the week award ===
Week	Offensive			Defensive			Special Teams		
Week	Player	Team	Position	Player	Team	Position	Player	Team	Position
Week 1	Michael Pratt	Tulane	QB	Yvandy Rigby	Temple	LB	Seth Morgan	Memphis	K
Week 2	JT Daniels	Rice	QB	Trey Moore	UTSA	LB	Chase Allen	UTSA	K
Week 3	Preston Stone	SMU	QB	Daquan Evans	South Florida	S	Noah Rauschenberg	North Texas	K
Week 4	Byrum Brown	South Florida	QB	Kendarin Ray	Tulsa	S	Grant Gonya	Charlotte	P
Week 5	Cardell Williams	Tulsa	QB	Tramel Logan	South Florida	DE	Geoffrey Cantin-Arku	Memphis	LB
Week 6	Jermaine Brown Jr.	UAB	RB	Luke Pirris	Navy	DE/LB	Logan Lupo	Florida Atlantic	K/P
Week 7	Daniel Richardson	Florida Atlantic	QB	Trey Moore (2)	UTSA	LB	Riley Riethman	Navy	P
Week 8	Michael Pratt (2)	Tulane	QB	Demetrius Knight II	Charlotte	LB	Roderick Daniels Jr.	SMU	WR
Week 9	Preston Stone (2)	SMU	QB	Trey Moore (3)	UTSA	LB	Valentino Ambrosio	Tulane	K
Week 10	Jacob Zeno	UAB	QB	Nikhai Hill-Green	Charlotte	LB	Collin Rogers	SMU	K
Week 11	Seth Henigan	Memphis	QB	Colin Ramos	Navy	LB	Andrew Conrad	East Carolina	K
Week 12	Frank Harris	UTSA	QB	Colin Ramos (2)	Navy	LB	Matt Quinn	UAB	K
Week 13	Byrum Brown (2); Preston Stone (3)	South Florida; SMU	QB; QB	Kam Pedescleaux	Tulane	S	Noah Rauschenberg (2)	North Texas	K

=== American Athletic Individual Awards ===
The following individuals received postseason honors as chosen by the league's head coaches.

Award	Player	School
Offensive Player of the Year	Michael Pratt	Tulane
Defensive Player of the Year	Trey Moore	UTSA
Special Teams Player of the Year	LaJohntay Wester	Florida Atlantic
Rookie of the Year	Makhi Hughes	Tulane
Coach of the Year	Willie Fritz	Tulane

=== All-Conference Teams ===
The following players were selected part of the All-Conference teams.

Position	Player	Team
First Team Offense
WR	LaJohntay Wester	Florida Atlantic
WR	Luke McCaffrey	Rice
WR	Joshua Cephus	UTSA
OT	Marcus Bryant	SMU
OT	Cameron Wire	Tulane
OG	Justin Osborne	SMU
OG	Logan Parr	SMU
C	Sincere Haynesworth	Tulane
TE	RJ Maryland	SMU
QB	Frank Harris	UTSA
QB	Michael Pratt	Tulane
RB	Blake Watson	Memphis
RB	Makhi Hughes	Tulane
First Team Defense
DL	Elijah Chatman	SMU
DL	Darius Hodges	Tulane
DL	Patrick Jenkins	Tulane
DL	Ben Kopenski	Tulsa
LB	Demetrius Knight II	Charlotte
LB	Colin Ramos	Navy
LB	Chandler Martin	Memphis
LB	Trey Moore	UTSA
CB	Kam Alexander	UTSA
CB	Jarius Monroe	Tulane
S	Julius Wood	East Carolina
S	Rashad Wisdom	UTSA
First Team Special Teams
K	Collin Rogers	SMU
P	Riley Reithman	Navy
RS	LaJohntay Wester	Florida Atlantic

Position	Player	Team
Second Team Offense
WR	Roc Taylor	Memphis
WR	Ja'Mori Maclin	North Texas
WR	Sean Atkins	South Florida
OT	Chaz Neal	Florida Atlantic
OT	Xavier Hill	Memphis
OG	Gabe Blair	North Texas
OG	Terrell Haynes	UTSA
C	Branson Hickman	SMU
TE	David Martin-Robinson	Temple
QB	Seth Henigan	Memphis
RB	Ayo Adeyi	North Texas
RB	Jaylan Knighton	SMU
Second Team Defense
DL	Eyabi Okie	Charlotte
DL	D'Anta Johnson	East Carolina
DL	Jaylon Allen	Memphis
DL	Elijah Roberts	SMU
LB	Kobe Wilson	SMU
LB	Donyai Taylor	UTSA
LB	Jordan Magee	Temple
LB	Jesus Machado	Tulane
CB	Shavon Revel	East Carolina
CB	Lance Robinson	Tulane
S	Kam Pedescleaux	Tulane
S	Kendarin Ray	Tulsa
Second Team Special Teams
K	Chase Allen	UTSA
P	Lucas Dean	UTSA
RS	Roderick Daniels Jr.	SMU

Position	Player	Team
Third Team Offense
WR	Tejhaun Palmer	UAB
WR	Chris Brazzell II	Tulane
WR	Lawrence Keys III	Tulane
OT	Ernesto Almaraz	UTSA
OT	Rashad Green	Tulane
OG	Febechi Nwaiwu	North Texas
OG	Chester Baah	Tulsa
C	Jacob Likes	Memphis
TE	Oscar Cardenas	UTSA
QB	Preston Stone	SMU
RB	Jermaine Brown Jr.	UAB
RB	Anthony Watkins	Tulsa
Third Team Defense
DL	Evan Anderson	Florida Atlantic
DL	Brandon Brown	UTSA
DL	Joe Evans	UTSA
DL	Brandon Matterson	UTSA
LB	Nikhai Hill-Green	Charlotte
LB	Jeremy Lewis	East Carolina
LB	Jordan Brown	North Texas
LB	Tyler Grubbs	Tulane
CB	Dontae Balfour	Charlotte
CB	Charles Woods	SMU
S	Jarron Morris	Florida Atlantic
S	Simeon Blair	Memphis
S	Rayuan Lane	Navy
S	Jonathan McGill	SMU
Third Team Special Teams
K	Noah Rauschenberg	North Texas
K	Chase Meyer	Tulsa
P	Ryan Bujcevski	SMU
RS	Jha'Quan Jackson	Tulane

=== All-Americans ===
Currently, the NCAA compiles consensus all-America teams in the sports of Division I-FBS football and Division I men's basketball using a point system computed from All-America teams named by coaches associations or media sources. The system consists of three points for a first-team honor, two points for second-team honor, and one point for third-team honor. Honorable mention and fourth team or lower recognitions are not accorded any points. College Football All-American consensus teams are compiled by position and the player accumulating the most points at each position is named first team consensus all-American. Currently, the NCAA recognizes All-Americans selected by the AP, AFCA, FWAA, TSN, and the WCFF to determine Consensus and Unanimous All-Americans. Any player named to the First Team by all five of the NCAA-recognized selectors is deemed a Unanimous All-American.

Position	Player	School	Selector	Unanimous	Consensus
First Team All-Americans
PR	LaJohntay Wester	Florida Atlantic	FWAA		

Position	Player	School	Selector	Unanimous	Consensus
Second Team All-Americans
LB	Trey Moore	UTSA	AFCA		
PR	LaJohntay Wester	Florida Atlantic	FOX		

== Home game attendance ==
Team	Stadium	Capacity	Game 1	Game 2	Game 3	Game 4	Game 5	Game 6	Game 7	Game 8	Total	Average	% of Capacity
Charlotte	Jerry Richardson Stadium	15,314	15,622	14,410	15,659	10,857	8,895	9,385			74,828	12,471	81.44%
East Carolina	Dowdy–Ficklen Stadium	50,000	38,211	40,589	33,444	39,842	33,765	29,567			215,418	35,903	71.81%
Florida Atlantic	FAU Stadium	29,495	20,893	17,934	21,077	17,241	17,532	15,871			110,548	18,425	62.47%
Memphis	Simmons Bank Liberty Stadium	58,862	26,632	25,551	30,364	35,609	30,223	30,313			178,692	29,782	50.6%
Navy	Navy–Marine Corps Memorial Stadium	34,000	29,798	29,789	28,648	38,803	29,078	28,708			184,824	30,804	90.6%
North Texas	DATCU Stadium	30,850	21,350	21,494	13,678	18,062	17,354	14,628			106,566	17,761	57.57%
Rice	Rice Stadium	47,000	23,425	18,103	19,598	21,207	20,436	21,632	19,393		143,794	20,542	43.71%
SMU	Gerald J. Ford Stadium	32,000	21,490	24,489	25,385	20,800	22,043	21,490			135,697	22,616	70.68%
South Florida	Raymond James Stadium	65,897	36,495	65,138	29,141	36,670	30,938	29,279			227,661	37,944	57.58%
Temple	Lincoln Financial Field	68,532	12,456	10,932	17,234	18,388	11,232	13,049	10,830		94,121	13,446	19.62%
Tulane	Yulman Stadium	30,000	26,973	30,000	22,842	20,102	30,000	20,126	25,103		175,146	25,021	83.4%
Tulsa	Skelly Field at H. A. Chapman Stadium	30,000	17,529	30,855	17,538	18,527	20,151	16,520			121,120	20,187	67.29%
UAB	Protective Stadium	47,100	25,363	21,673	23,792	20,269	20,676	17,486			129,259	21,543	45.74%
UTSA	Alamodome	36,582	49,324	27,138	23,808	22,629	28,245	22,096			173,258	28,876	78.93%

Capacity source on all 14 stadiums:

== NFL draft ==
The NFL draft was held at Campus Martius Park in Detroit. The following list includes all AAC players in the draft.

=== List of selections ===
Player	Position	School	Draft Round	Round Pick	Overall Pick	Team
Luke McCaffrey	WR	Rice	3	36	100	Washington Commanders
Jordan Magee	LB	Temple	5	5	139	Washington Commanders
Jha'Quan Jackson	WR	Tulane	6	6	182	Tennessee Titans
Tejhaun Palmer	WR	UAB	6	15	191	Arizona Cardinals
Michael Pratt	QB	Tulane	7	25	245	Green Bay Packers
