= Trey Moore (American football) =

American football player (born 2003)

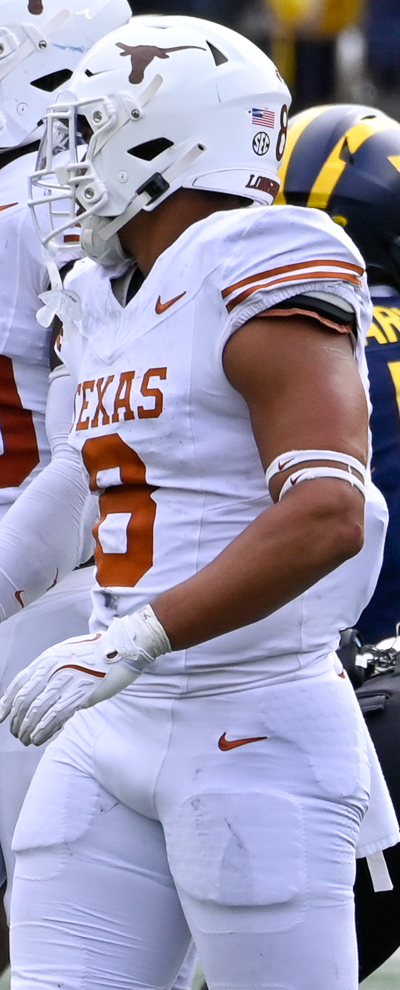
- Moore in 2024

No. 17 – Miami Dolphins
- Position: Linebacker
- Roster status: Injured reserve

Personal information
- Born: May 5, 2003 (age 23); Houston, Texas, U.S.
- Listed height: 6 ft 2 in (1.88 m)
- Listed weight: 247 lb (112 kg)

Career information
- High school: Smithson Valley (Spring Branch, Texas)
- College: UTSA (2021–2023); Texas (2024–2025)
- NFL draft: 2026: 4th round, 130th overall pick

Career history
- Miami Dolphins (2026–present)

Awards and highlights
- AAC Defensive Player of the Year (2023); First-team All-AAC (2023)
- Stats at Pro Football Reference

Trey Moore (born May 5, 2003) is an American professional football linebacker for the Miami Dolphins of the National Football League (NFL). He played college football for the Texas Longhorns and UTSA Roadrunners and was selected by the Dolphins in the fourth round of the 2026 NFL draft.

== Early life ==
Moore was born in Houston and raised in north San Antonio. He attended Smithson Valley High School in Comal County, Texas and committed to play college football for the UTSA Roadrunners.

== College career ==
=== UTSA ===
As a freshman in 2021, Moore notched just one tackle. In 2022, he recorded 59 tackles, with 18 being for a loss, eight sacks, six pass deflections, a fumble recovery, and two forced fumbles. His 18 tackles for a loss set the school record previously held by Marcus Davenport. For his performance on the season, Moore was named a Freshman All-American. After the season, Moore announced that he would return to the Roadrunners. During week 2 of the 2023 season, he notched three sacks versus Texas State. Moore finished the 2023 season with a school record 14 sacks. For his performance on the year, Moore was named first-team all-AAC and the AAC defensive player of the year.

On December 5, 2023, Moore announced that he would be entering the NCAA transfer portal.

=== Texas ===
On December 23, 2023, Moore announced that he would be transferring to Texas. In the 2024 season, he started in all 16 games and recorded 35 tackles, with 10 being for a loss, 5.5 sacks, two pass deflections, and two forced fumbles. At the end of the season, Moore announced that he would return to Texas for his senior season. At the end of the season, he was named a William V. Campbell Trophy finalist and member of the NFF National Scholar-Athlete Class. On December 11, 2025, Moore declared for the NFL draft.

=== College statistics ===
| Year | Team | GP | Tackles | | | | | Interceptions | | | | Fumbles | | | |
| Year | Team | GP | Solo | Ast | Cmb | TfL | Sck | Int | Yds | TD | PD | FR | Yds | TD | FF |
|---|---|---|---|---|---|---|---|---|---|---|---|---|---|---|---|
| 2021 | UTSA | 3 | 0 | 1 | 1 | 0 | 0 | 0 | 0 | 0 | 0 | 0 | 0 | 0 | 0 |
| 2022 | UTSA | 14 | 30 | 29 | 59 | 18.0 | 8.0 | 0 | 0 | 0 | 6 | 1 | 0 | 0 | 2 |
| 2023 | UTSA | 12 | 30 | 15 | 45 | 17.5 | 14.0 | 1 | 3 | 0 | 3 | 1 | 0 | 0 | 1 |
| 2024 | Texas | 16 | 22 | 13 | 35 | 9.5 | 5.5 | 0 | 0 | 0 | 1 | 2 | 13 | 0 | 2 |
| 2025 | Texas | 12 | 22 | 13 | 35 | 5.0 | 3.0 | 0 | 0 | 0 | 3 | 1 | 21 | 0 | 0 |
| Career | | 57 | 104 | 71 | 175 | 50.0 | 30.5 | 1 | 3 | 0 | 13 | 5 | 34 | 0 | 5 |

== Professional career ==
Pre-draft measurables
| Height | Weight | Arm length | Hand span | Wingspan | 40-yard dash | 10-yard split | 20-yard split | 20-yard shuttle | Three-cone drill | Vertical jump | Broad jump |
|---|---|---|---|---|---|---|---|---|---|---|---|
| 6 ft 1 5/8 in (1.87 m) | 243 lb (110 kg) | 31 5/8 in (0.80 m) | 10 1/2 in (0.27 m) | 6 ft 6 1/8 in (1.98 m) | 4.54 s | 1.60 s | 2.63 s | 4.21 s | 7.08 s | 38.5 in (0.98 m) | 10 ft 0 in (3.05 m) |
All values from NFL Combine/Pro Day

Moore was selected by the Miami Dolphins with the 130th overall pick in the fourth round of the 2026 NFL draft. He signed his four-year rookie contract worth $5.42 million. On August 25, 2026, it was announced that Moore would require surgery to address an ankle injury suffered in the team's preseason contest against the New York Giants.
