= Kyle DeVan =

American football player and coach (born 1985)

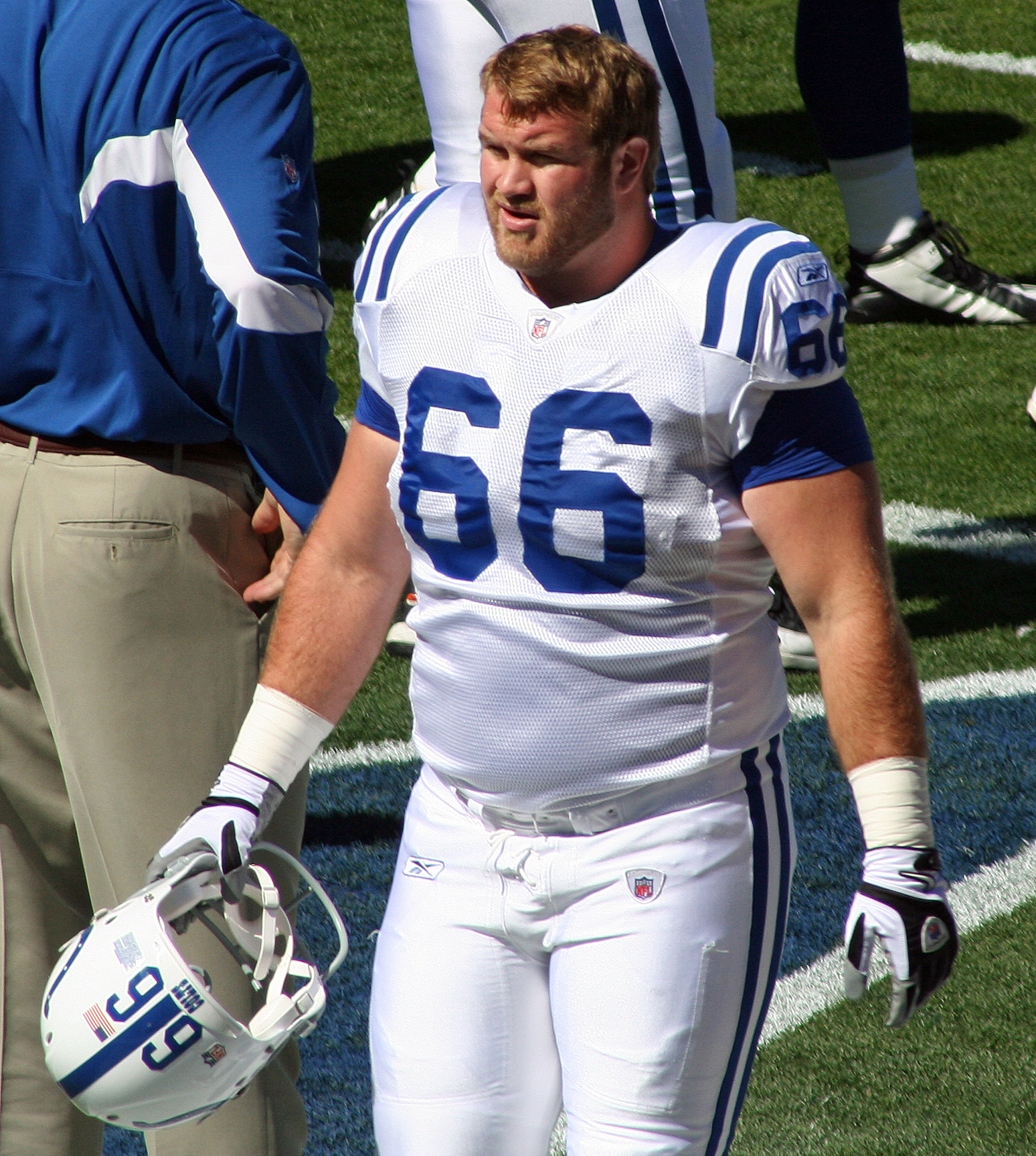
- DeVan with the Indianapolis Colts in 2010

Chicago Bears
- Title: Assistant offensive line coach

Personal information
- Born: February 10, 1985 (age 41); Sacramento, California, U.S.
- Listed height: 6 ft 2 in (1.88 m)
- Listed weight: 306 lb (139 kg)

Career information
- Position: Center (No. 66, 68, 62)
- High school: Vacaville (Vacaville, California)
- College: Oregon State
- NFL draft: 2008: undrafted

Career history

Playing
- Washington Redskins (2008)*; New York Jets (2008)*; Boise Burn (2009); Indianapolis Colts (2009−2010); Philadelphia Eagles (2011); Tennessee Titans (2012)
- * Offseason or practice squad member only

Coaching
- New Orleans Saints (2015) Assistant offensive line coach; Ball State (2016–2018) Offensive line coach; Arizona (2019–2020) Offensive line coach; Michigan (2021) Offensive analyst; Colorado (2022) Offensive line coach; Charlotte (2023) Offensive line coach; Oregon State (2024) Offensive line coach; Chicago Bears (2025–present) Assistant offensive line coach

Awards and highlights
- First-team All-Pac-10 (2006)

Career NFL statistics
- Games played: 40
- Games started: 26
- Stats at Pro Football Reference

Kyle Chandler DeVan (born February 10, 1985) is an American football coach and former guard who is the assistant offensive line coach with the Chicago Bears of the National Football League (NFL). He was previously an assistant coach for the New Orleans Saints. He played college football for the Oregon State Beavers.

== Playing career ==
Pre-draft measurables
Height	Weight
6 ft 1 5/8 in (1.87 m)	308 lb (140 kg)
Values from Pro Day

DeVan was signed by the Washington Redskins as an undrafted free agent in 2008. He was also a member of the New York Jets, Indianapolis Colts, Philadelphia Eagles, and Tennessee Titans of the NFL, as well as the Boise Burn of AF2.

In the 2009 NFL season, DeVan was signed by the Indianapolis Colts and later became the team's starting right guard. He started in the 2009 Super Bowl, in which the Colts lost to the Saints.

== Coaching career ==
=== New Orleans Saints ===
He previously worked as an assistant offensive line coach for the New Orleans Saints

=== Ball State ===
From 2016 to 2018, Devan was the offensive line coach for Ball State University. He also spent time as assistant head coach.

=== Arizona ===
On February 2, 2019, the Arizona Wildcats hired DeVan as the Offensive line coach. He was let go after the 2020 season.

=== Michigan ===
In 2021 DeVan served as an analyst for the Wolverines.

=== Colorado ===
In 2022 DeVan became the offensive line coach for the Buffalos.

=== Charlotte ===
On December 21, 2022, DeVan was named associate head coach, run game coordinator and offensive line coach on Biff Poggi's first coaching staff at Charlotte.

=== Oregon State ===
On December 4, 2023, Devan was named the offensive line coach at Oregon State.
