= Ryan Osborn =

American football coach (born 1988)

Current position
- Title: Assistant head coach & defensive coordinator
- Team: Columbia
- Conference: Ivy League

Biographical details
- Born: January 1, 1988 (age 38)
- Education: Bridgewater State ('08); Mississippi State ('17)

Coaching career (HC unless noted)
- 2008–2010: Bridgewater State (WR)
- 2011–2012: Maine Maritime (ST/DL)
- 2013: Amherst (OLB)
- 2014: St. Norbert (CB)
- 2015: St. Norbert (DC)
- 2016–2017: Mississippi State (GA)
- 2018–2019: Florida (GA)
- 2020: UT Martin (co-ST/DL)
- 2021: Michigan (defensive analyst)
- 2022: Baltimore Ravens (defensive assistant)
- 2023–2024: Charlotte (DC/OLB)
- 2025: Oklahoma State (DL)
- 2026–present: Columbia (DC/AHC)

Ryan Osborn (born January 1, 1988) is an American college football coach. He is the assistant head coach and defensive coordinator for Columbia, a position he has held since 2026.

== Coaching career ==
In 2008, following Osborn's graduation from Bridgewater State, he joined the team as the wide receivers coach. After three seasons, he was hired as the special teams coordinator and defensive line coach for Maine Maritime. In 2013, he joined Amherst as the outside linebackers coach. After one season he was hired as the cornerbacks coach for St. Norbert. He was promoted to defensive coordinator before the following season.

In 2016, Osborn began his Division I coaching career as a graduate assistant at Mississippi State for one year until he left for Florida as again a graduate assistant until 2019. He got his first full coaching job when he was hired by UT Martin to be their defensive line coach. The following year, he joined Michigan as a defensive analyst. His coaching impact was shown almost immediately as he helped guide Aidan Hutchinson to first-team All-American honors and become a Heisman Trophy finalist while also breaking many records at Michigan. His leadership and skills helped him land a job with the Baltimore Ravens as a defensive assistant where he was joined by former Wolverine David Ojabo, who was recently drafted in the 2022 NFL draft by the Ravens

Following the 2022 NFL season, Osborn became the defensive coordinator for the Charlotte 49ers under new head coach Biff Poggi.

On December 8, 2024, Osborn was hired by Oklahoma State as the defensive line coach.

On January 14, 2026, Osborn was hired by Columbia as the assistant head coach and defensive coordinator.
