= Dontae Balfour =

American football player (born 2002)

No. 20 – Texas Tech Red Raiders
- Position: Cornerback
- Class: Redshirt Senior

Personal information
- Born: October 6, 2002 (age 24)
- Listed height: 6 ft 0 in (1.83 m)
- Listed weight: 189 lb (86 kg)

Career information
- High school: Bradford (Starke, Florida)
- College: North Carolina (2021–2022); Charlotte (2023–2024); Texas Tech (2025)

Awards and highlights
- Third team All-AAC (2023)
- Stats at ESPN

Dontae Balfour (born October 6, 2002) is an American football cornerback for the Texas Tech Red Raiders. He previously played for the Charlotte 49ers and for the North Carolina Tar Heels.

== Early life ==
Balfour attended Bradford High School in Starke, Florida. After totaling 14 interceptions during his high school career, he signed to play college football for the North Carolina Tar Heels as the 17th ranked cornerback in the class of 2021.

== College career ==
=== North Carolina ===
In two years at North Carolina from 2021 to 2022, Balfour appeared in six games with one start, totaling six tackles. After the 2022 season, he entered the NCAA transfer portal.

=== Charlotte ===
Balfour transferred to play for the Charlotte 49ers. In two seasons at Charlotte in 2023 and 2024, he made 23 starts, notching 103 tackles, 22 pass deflections, three interception, and two forced fumbles. After the 2024 season, Balfour once again entered the transfer portal.

=== Texas Tech ===
Balfour transferred to play for the Texas Tech Red Raiders. He entered the 2025 season as a starter in the Red Raiders secondary.

== Professional career ==
Pre-draft measurables
Height	Weight	Arm length	Hand span	Wingspan	40-yard dash	10-yard split	20-yard split	20-yard shuttle	Three-cone drill	Vertical jump	Broad jump	Bench press
6 ft 0 1/4 in (1.84 m)	189 lb (86 kg)	32 3/8 in (0.82 m)	8 3/4 in (0.22 m)	6 ft 5 in (1.96 m)	4.59 s	1.68 s	2.69 s	4.32 s	6.78 s	35.5 in (0.90 m)	10 ft 6 in (3.20 m)	14 reps
All values from Pro Day
