= Nikhai Hill-Green =

American football player (born 2000)

Colorado Stampede
- Position: Linebacker
- Roster status: Active

Personal information
- Born: December 30, 2000 (age 25); Pittsburgh, Pennsylvania
- Listed height: 6 ft 1 in (1.85 m)
- Listed weight: 223 lb (101 kg)

Career information
- High school: Saint Francis Academy (Baltimore, Maryland)
- College: Michigan (2020–2022); Charlotte (2023); Colorado (2024); Alabama (2025)
- NFL draft: 2026: undrafted

Career history
- Los Angeles Rams (2026)*; Calgary Stampeders (2026)*; Colorado Stampede (2027–present)
- * Offseason or practice squad member only

Awards and highlights
- Second-team All-Big 12 (2024); Third team All-AAC (2023)
- Stats at ESPN

Nikhai Seiyere Hill-Green (born December 30, 2000) is an American professional football linebacker for the Colorado Stampede of the United Football League (UFL). He played college football for the University of Alabama, the Colorado Buffaloes, the Charlotte 49ers and the Michigan Wolverines.

== Early life ==
Hill-Green attended Saint Frances Academy in Baltimore, Maryland. He was rated as a three-star recruit and committed to play college football for the Michigan Wolverines.

== College career ==
=== Michigan ===
In Hill-Green's first two collegiate seasons in 2020 and 2021, he played in 17 games, where he totaled 51 tackles with two being for a loss, and a pass deflection. Heading into the 2022 season, he suffered multiple injuries which caused him to miss the entirety of the 2022 season. After the season, Hill-Green entered his name into the NCAA transfer portal.

=== Charlotte ===
Hill-Green transferred to play for the Charlotte 49ers. In his only season with the team in 2023, he notched 73 tackles and was named to the third-team all-American Athletic Conference. After the season, Hill-Green once again entered his name into the NCAA transfer portal.

=== Colorado ===
Hill-Green transferred to play for the Colorado Buffaloes.

=== Alabama ===
On December 22 2024, Hill-Green transferred to Alabama. In his final collegiate season, Hill-Green had 60 tackles in helping the Crimson Tide to the Rose Bowl.

== Professional career ==
Pre-draft measurables
| Height | Weight | Arm length | Hand span | Wingspan | 40-yard dash | 10-yard split | 20-yard split | 20-yard shuttle | Three-cone drill | Vertical jump | Broad jump | Bench press |
|---|---|---|---|---|---|---|---|---|---|---|---|---|
| 6 ft 1 in (1.85 m) | 223 lb (101 kg) | 32 3/8 in (0.82 m) | 9 7/8 in (0.25 m) | 6 ft 6 in (1.98 m) | 4.67 s | 1.58 s | 2.71 s | 4.44 s | 7.07 s | 34.5 in (0.88 m) | 9 ft 4 in (2.84 m) | 23 reps |
All values from Pro Day

=== Los Angeles Rams ===
After going unselected in the 2026 NFL Draft, on April 28, 2026 the Los Angeles Rams signed Hill-Green as an undrafted free agent. He was waived by Los Angeles on August 29.

=== Calgary Stampeders ===
On September 15, 2026, Hill-Green signed with the Calgary Stampeders practice roster of the Canadian Football League (CFL). On September 24, he was released by the Stampeders.

=== Colorado Stampeders ===
Hill-Green was selected in the third round of the 2027 UFL draft by the Colorado Stampede.
