= Biff Poggi =

American football player and coach (born 1959)

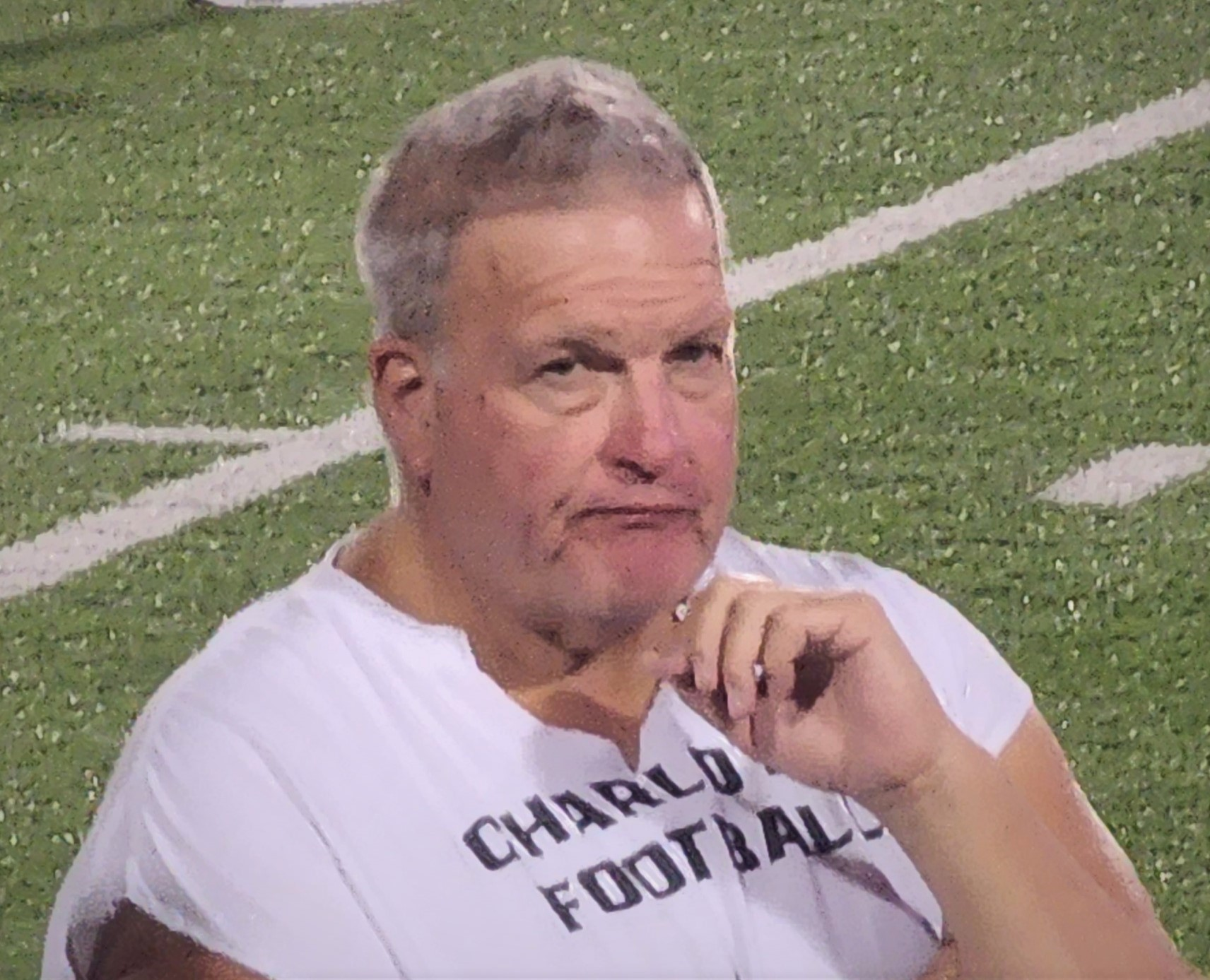
- Poggi in 2023

Biographical details
- Born: June 6, 1960 (age 66); Baltimore, Maryland, U.S.

Playing career
- 1979: Pittsburgh
- Position: Offensive lineman

Coaching career (HC unless noted)
- 1987: Brown (assistant)
- 1987: Temple (assistant)
- 1987: The Citadel (assistant)
- 1988–1995: Gilman School (MD) (OC/OL)
- 1996–2015: Gilman School (MD)
- 2016: Michigan (analyst)
- 2017–2020: Saint Frances Academy (MD)
- 2021–2022: Michigan (assoc. HC)
- 2023–2024: Charlotte
- 2025: Michigan (associate/interim HC)

Head coaching record
- Overall: 8–17 (college)
- Bowls: 0–1

Francis Xavier "Biff" Poggi (/ˈpoʊdʒiː/; born June 6, 1960) is an American football coach and former player. He was most recently the interim head coach at the University of Michigan, a position he was promoted to after the firing of head coach Sherrone Moore. Biff rejoined the program in 2025 at the same role he held from 2021 to 2022. From 2023 to 2024, he was the head football coach at the University of North Carolina at Charlotte. Poggi also coached over twenty years of high school football at Gilman School (1996–2015) and Saint Frances Academy (2017–2020) in Baltimore.

== Early life and playing career ==
Poggi grew up in Baltimore's Little Italy neighborhood as a son of a pharmacist. Poggi graduated in 1979 from Gilman School in Baltimore. He played for the Pitt Panthers in 1979 and later transferred to Duke where he graduated in 1985. He started out as an assistant with various college programs, working with future NFL coach Bruce Arians, before leaving college coaching after his mother was diagnosed with cancer.

== High school coaching career ==
Poggi entered high school coaching as a volunteer with his alma mater, the Gilman School, while working a day job in finance. In 1996 he was promoted to head coach until he left to begin as an analyst at Michigan. As head coach of Gilman he won 13 conference championships and was the winningest coach in school history. After one year at Michigan, he returned to Baltimore as the head football coach of Saint Frances, where he also donated equipment, provided scholarships, and paid tutors and cooks for the team.

== College coaching career ==
Poggi got his first win as an NCAA head coach at the University of North Carolina at Charlotte against South Carolina State in his first game on September 2, 2023. Poggi recorded his first FBS and conference win on October 21, a 10–7 road win over in-state rival East Carolina. Poggi went 6-16 over two seasons before Charlotte fired him with two games remaining in the 2024 season. Tim Brewster succeeded him as interim head coach.

In 2025, Poggi returned to the University of Michigan as an associate coach under Sherrone Moore, a position he held there from 2021 to 2022 under former head coach Jim Harbaugh. He was first hired by the Wolverines as an analyst in 2016, serving for one season under Harbaugh before he returned to coach high school football the next four seasons.

During the 2025 season, Poggi served as the interim head coach for Michigan's wins against Central Michigan and Nebraska in late September while head coach Sherrone Moore was serving a suspension. On December 10, Poggi was again named interim head coach, being promoted for the 2025 Citrus Bowl after Moore was fired.

== Analyst career ==
After the 2025 season, Poggi left coaching and became an analyst for the Big Ten Network.

== Personal life ==
In 1985, Poggi was engaged to Amelia Jean "Amy" Mix, a fellow member of Duke University's class of 1985. The couple were married on March 8, 1986, at St. Helena's Episcopal Church in Beaufort, South Carolina. The Poggis have three sons and two daughters. Henry Poggi played as a fullback at Michigan and was one reason Poggi restarted his college career there. Both daughters also attended Michigan.

Before coaching football, Poggi was a hedge fund manager with his father-in-law. Poggi's company, Samuel James Limited, was founded in 1986 and made him a multimillionaire. After three decades, Poggi turned over the firm's operations to multiple former players.

The nickname "Biff" dates from his childhood and was selected by his older brother after "Spike" was vetoed by their mother.

== Head coaching record ==
=== College ===
Year	Team	Overall	Conference	Standing	Bowl/playoffs	Coaches^{#}	AP^{°}
Charlotte 49ers (American Athletic Conference) (2023–2024)
2023	Charlotte	3–9	2–6	T–11th			
2024	Charlotte	3–7 (Note: Charlotte fired Poggi after the first ten games of the 2024 season. Tim Brewster was appointed interim head coach for the rest of the year. Charlotte finished the season 5–7 overall and 4–4 in conference play, placing in a three-way tie for sixth in the American Athletic Conference.)	2–4				
Charlotte:		6–16	4–10				
Michigan Wolverines (Big Ten Conference) (2025)
2025	Michigan	2–1 (Note: Michigan's head coach Sherrone Moore was suspended for the third and fourth games of the 2025 season against Central Michigan and Nebraska, and fired before the Citrus Bowl; during which Poggi served as interim head coach.)	1–0		L Citrus	22	21
Michigan:		2–1	1–0				
Total:		8–17					
^{#}Rankings from final Coaches Poll.; ^{°}Rankings from final AP Poll.
