= 2021 Michigan Wolverines football team =

American college football season

2021 Michigan Wolverines football

Big Ten champion Big Ten East Division co-champion

Big Ten Championship Game, W 42–3 vs. Iowa

Orange Bowl (CFP semifinal), L 11–34 vs. Georgia
- Conference: Big Ten Conference
- East Division

Ranking
- Coaches: No. 3
- AP: No. 3
- Record: 12–2 (8–1 Big Ten)
- Head coach: Jim Harbaugh (7th season)
- Offensive coordinator: Josh Gattis (3rd season)
- Co-offensive coordinator: Sherrone Moore (1st season)
- Offensive scheme: Pro spread
- Defensive coordinator: Mike Macdonald (1st season)
- Base defense: 4–2–5
- MVP: Aidan Hutchinson
- Captains: Aidan Hutchinson; Josh Ross; Andrew Vastardis; Ronnie Bell
- Home stadium: Michigan Stadium

Uniform
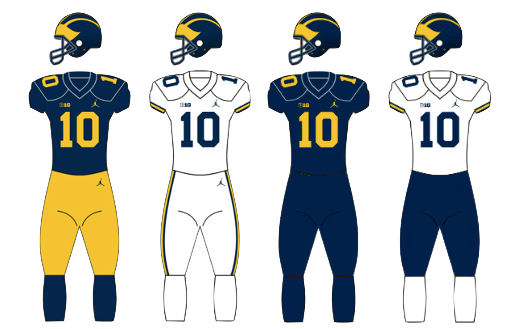

2021 Big Ten Conference football standings
	Conf.			Overall
Team	W		L	W		L
East Division
No. 3 Michigan xy$^	8	–	1	12	–	2
No. 6 Ohio State x	8	–	1	11	–	2
No. 9 Michigan State	7	–	2	11	–	2
Penn State	4	–	5	7	–	6
Maryland	3	–	6	7	–	6
Rutgers	2	–	7	5	–	8
Indiana	0	–	9	2	–	10
West Division
No. 23 Iowa xy	7	–	2	10	–	4
Minnesota	6	–	3	9	–	4
Wisconsin	6	–	3	9	–	4
Purdue	6	–	3	9	–	4
Illinois	4	–	5	5	–	7
Nebraska	1	–	8	3	–	9
Northwestern	1	–	8	3	–	9
Championship: Michigan 42, Iowa 3
^ – College Football Playoff participant; $ – Conference champion; x – Division champion/co-champions; y – Championship game participant; Rankings from AP Poll

The 2021 Michigan Wolverines football team was an American football team that represented the University of Michigan as a member of the East Division of the Big Ten Conference during the 2021 NCAA Division I FBS football season. In their seventh year under head coach Jim Harbaugh, the team compiled a 12–2 record (8–1 against conference opponents), won the Big Ten championship, outscored opponents by a total of 501 to 243, and was ranked No. 3 in the final AP and Coaches Polls. The Wolverines advanced to the College Football Playoff for the first time in program history, losing to eventual national champion Georgia in the Orange Bowl.

After starting the season unranked, Michigan won its first seven games, including victories on the road against Wisconsin and Nebraska. On October 30, Michigan (ranked No. 6) lost to Michigan State (ranked No. 8). The Wolverines rebounded with five consecutive wins, including a 42–27 victory over No. 2 Ohio State – Michigan's first victory over its rival since 2011. The Wolverines advanced to the Big Ten Football Championship Game, defeating Iowa, 42–3. It was Michigan's first conference championship since 2004 and its first outright title since 2003.

The team's statistical leaders included Cade McNamara with 2,576 passing yards, Hassan Haskins with 1,327 rushing yards, Cornelius Johnson with 627 receiving yards, Jake Moody with 125 points scored, Josh Ross with 106 total tackles, and Aidan Hutchinson with 14 quarterback sacks.

Aidan Hutchinson won the Big Ten Defensive Player of the Year award, was a unanimous first-team All-American, and finished second in the voting for the Heisman Trophy. Jake Moody was also a consensus first-team All-American and the recipient of the Lou Groza Award as the nation's top kicker. Harbaugh won the Associated Press College Football Coach of the Year Award, and offensive coordinator Josh Gattis won the Broyles Award as the nation's top assistant coach. The Wolverines' offensive line won the Joe Moore Award. Six Michigan players received first-team honors on the All-Big Ten football team: Hutchinson, Moody, Haskins, David Ojabo, Daxton Hill, and Andrew Stueber.

== Schedule ==
Date	Time	Opponent	Rank	Site	TV	Result	Attendance	Source
September 4	12:00 p.m.	Western Michigan*		Michigan Stadium; Ann Arbor, MI	ESPN	W 47–14	109,295	
September 11	8:00 p.m.	Washington*		Michigan Stadium; Ann Arbor, MI	ABC	W 31–10	108,345	
September 18	12:00 p.m.	Northern Illinois*	No. 25	Michigan Stadium; Ann Arbor, MI	BTN	W 63–10	106,263	
September 25	3:30 p.m.	Rutgers^{†}	No. 19	Michigan Stadium; Ann Arbor, MI	ABC	W 20–13	106,943	
October 2	12:00 p.m.	at Wisconsin	No. 14	Camp Randall Stadium; Madison, WI (Big Noon Kickoff)	FOX	W 38–17	74,855	
October 9	7:30 p.m.	at Nebraska	No. 9	Memorial Stadium; Lincoln, NE	ABC	W 32–29	87,380	
October 23	12:00 p.m.	Northwestern	No. 6	Michigan Stadium; Ann Arbor, MI (George Jewett Trophy)	FOX	W 33–7	109,449	
October 30	12:00 p.m.	at No. 8 Michigan State	No. 6	Spartan Stadium; East Lansing, MI (rivalry, Big Noon Kickoff, College GameDay)	FOX	L 33–37	76,549	
November 6	7:30 p.m.	Indiana	No. 7	Michigan Stadium; Ann Arbor, MI	FOX	W 29–7	109,890	
November 13	12:00 p.m.	at Penn State	No. 6	Beaver Stadium; State College, PA (rivalry)	ABC	W 21–17	109,534	
November 20	3:30 p.m.	at Maryland	No. 6	Maryland Stadium; College Park, MD	BTN	W 59–18	36,181	
November 27	12:00 p.m.	No. 2 Ohio State	No. 5	Michigan Stadium; Ann Arbor, MI (rivalry, Big Noon Kickoff, College GameDay)	FOX	W 42–27	111,156	
December 4	8:00 p.m.	vs. No. 13 Iowa*	No. 2	Lucas Oil Stadium; Indianapolis, IN (Big Ten Championship Game, Big Noon Kickoff)	FOX	W 42–3	67,183	
December 31	7:30 p.m.	vs. No. 3 Georgia*	No. 2	Hard Rock Stadium; Miami Gardens, FL (Orange Bowl–CFP Semifinal, College GameDay)	ESPN	L 11–34	66,839	
*Non-conference game; ^{†}Homecoming; Rankings from AP Poll (and CFP Rankings, after November 2) - Released prior to game; All times are in Eastern time

== Rankings ==
Ranking movements Legend: ██ Increase in ranking ██ Decrease in ranking RV = Received votes ( ) = First-place votes
	Week															
Poll	Pre	1	2	3	4	5	6	7	8	9	10	11	12	13	14	Final
AP	RV	RV	25	19	14	9	8	6	6	9	9	8	6	2	2 (9)	3
Coaches	RV	RV	25	19	14	8	7	6	6	10	8	7	6	3	2 (5)	3
CFP	Not released									7	6	6	5	2	2	Not released

== Preseason ==
=== Firing of Don Brown ===
On December 22, 2020, Michigan fired defensive coordinator Don Brown. Brown had taken over as defensive coordinator in 2016 and led the 2016 squad to a No. 1 national ranking.

=== Harbaugh's extension ===
On January 8, 2021, head coach Jim Harbaugh signed a four-year contract extension with Michigan, continuing through the 2025 season. The extension reduced Harbaugh's $8-million base salary to $4 million for the 2021 season but added incentive bonuses of $500,000 for winning the Big Ten East, $1 million for winning the Big Ten championship, $500,000 for reaching the College Football Playoff semifinal, $1 million for winning the College Football Playoff, $75,000 for winning National Coach of the Year honors, and $50,000 for winning Big Ten Coach of the Year honors. The new agreement also lowered the buyout that the university would be required to pay if it fired him before the end of the contract.

=== Coaching changes ===
Following his four-year extension, Harbaugh led a major overhaul of the Michigan coaching staff. The overhaul shifted away from older coaches (Don Brown was 65, Ed Warinner was 59) to younger with 10 assistants under age 40. The moves included the following:

- On January 13, Michigan hired 34-year-old Mike Hart as running backs coach. Hart played for Michigan from 2004 to 2007 and set Michigan's career record with 5,040 rushing yards. He had been the running backs coach at Indiana since 2017 and associate head coach in 2020.
- On January 17, Michigan hired 33-year-old Mike Macdonald as defensive coordinator. Macdonald was hired based on the recommendation of coach Harbaugh's brother, John Harbaugh. Macdonald spent the previous seven seasons as an assistant coach on John Harbaugh's staff with the Baltimore Ravens.
- On January 19, Michigan hired 34-year-old George Helow, who had been Maryland's special teams coordinator and inside linebackers coach. Helow was initially assigned to coach safeties but was reassigned to linebackers.
- On January 20, Michigan hired 36-year-old Maurice Linguist as defensive backs coach and co-defensive coordinator, but he left three months later to become head coach at Buffalo.
- On January 25, Michigan hired 39-year-old Ronald Bellamy as the wide receivers coach (later switched to safeties). Bellamy was a wide receiver at Michigan from 1999 to 2002 and, prior to the hiring, was the head football coach at West Bloomfield High School.
- Also on January 25, Michigan announced several other moves. Sherrone Moore (age 34) moved from tight ends coach to offensive line coach and co-offensive coordinator. Jay Harbaugh (age 31) moved from running backs to tight ends and special teams.
- In February, offensive line coach Ed Warinner (age 59) left Michigan for Florida Atlantic.
- Also in February, Brian Jean-Mary left Michigan to become the linebackers coach at Tennessee.
- On February 22, Michigan hired Baltimore Ravens running backs coach Matt Weiss (age 37) as the new quarterbacks coach.
- In May 2021, Michigan hired Kentucky assistant coach Steve Clinkscale (age 42) to become the defensive backs coach and defensive passing game coordinator.

Offensive coordinator Josh Gattis (age 38) and defensive line coach Shaun Nua (age 40) were the only two assistants who remained in their prior positions.

== Game summaries ==
=== Western Michigan ===
Western Michigan at Michigan

Team	1	2	3	4	Total
Broncos	7	0	0	7	14
• Wolverines	10	17	6	14	47

- Date: September 4
- Location: Michigan Stadium
  Ann Arbor, MI
- Game start: 12:02 p.m. EDT
- Elapsed time: 3:21
- Game attendance: 109,925
- Game weather: 70º F, sunny, S 5 MPH
- Referee: John O'Neill
- TV announcers (ESPN): Bob Wischusen, Dan Orlovsky, and Kris Budden

Scoring summary
1	10:15	MICH	Blake Corum 14-yard pass from Cade McNamara (Jake Moody kick)	MICH 7–0
1	5:58	WMU	La'Darius Jefferson 2-yard run (Parker Sampson kick)	Tied 7–7
1	4:20	MICH	Jake Moody 37-yard field goal	MICH 10–7
2	9:18	MICH	Ronnie Bell 76-yard pass from Cade McNamara (Jake Moody kick)	MICH 17–7
2	6:18	MICH	Hassan Haskins 22-yard run (Jake Moody kick)	MICH 24–7
2	0:06	MICH	Jake Moody 20-yard field goal	MICH 27–7
3	10:01	MICH	A. J. Henning 75-yard run (Two-point conversion failed)	MICH 33–7
4	12:57	MICH	Blake Corum 30-yard run (Jake Moody kick)	MICH 40–7
4	7:57	MICH	Daylen Baldwin 69-yard pass from J. J. McCarthy (Jake Moody kick)	MICH 47–7
4	3:30	WMU	Corey Crooms 27-yard pass from Kaleb Eleby (Parker Sampson kick)	MICH 47–14

On September 4, Michigan opened their season with a 47–14 victory over Western Michigan. The game was played at Michigan Stadium before a crowd of 109,925.

On the game's opening drive, Michigan drove 75 yards, capped by a 14-yard touchdown pass from Cade McNamara to Blake Corum. Western Michigan responded with their own 75-yard drive, led by Kaleb Eleby's passing and ending with a two-yard touchdown run by La'Darius Jefferson. After the Broncos' touchdown, Blake Corum returned the kickoff 79 yards to the Western Michigan 21-yard line. The drive stalled at the 18-yard line, and Jake Moody kicked a 37-yard field goal to give Michigan a 10–7 lead at the end of the first quarter.

After giving up a touchdown on the Broncos' opening drive, Michigan's defense held Western Michigan to 18 yards in the remaining four drives of the first half. Michigan's offense also gained momentum with 17 points in the second quarter. Cade McNamara connected with Ronnie Bell for a 76-yard touchdown strike. Michigan's next possession started with a 36-yard punt return by Ronnie Bell, but Bell sustained a season-ending injury on the play. Hassan Haskins ran 22 yards for his first touchdown of the season with 6:18 remaining in the second quarter. At the end of the half, Michigan drove to the Broncos' one-yard line but settled for a 20-yard field goal by Moody, which made the score 27–7 in favor of Michigan at half-time.

On Michigan's first drive of the second half, A. J. Henning ran 74 yards for a touchdown, and Michigan's attempt at a two-point conversion failed. Early in the fourth quarter, Michigan sustained an 87-yard drive, culminating with a 30-yard touchdown run by Corum. True freshman quarterback J. J. McCarthy saw his first action in the fourth quarter. On third-and-25 from Michigan's 31-yard line, McCarthy scrambled and threw across the field to Daylen Baldwin for a 69-yard touchdown pass. Late in the fourth quarter, Kaleb Eleby led the Broncos on a 64-yard touchdown drive ending with a 27-yard pass to Corey Crooms.

Corum rushed for 111 yards and two touchdowns and became the first Michigan player to score a rushing and receiving touchdown in the same game since Khalid Hill in 2016. McNamara completed nine of 11 passes for 136 yards and two touchdowns. Aidan Hutchinson had a sack and blocked a field goal. Michigan's 550 yards of total offense were their most since tallying 660 yards against Maryland in 2016.

Statistics	WMU	UM
First downs	17	22
Plays–yards	69–317	60–551
Rushes–yards	32–126	43–335
Passing yards	191	216
Passing: comp–att–int	20–37–0	13–17–0
Turnovers		
Time of possession	31:51	28:09

Team	Category	Player	Statistics
W. Michigan	Passing	Kaleb Eleby	20/37, 191 yards, 1 TD
W. Michigan	Rushing	Sean Tyler	10 carries, 55 yards
W. Michigan	Receiving	Corey Crooms	4 receptions, 58 yards, 1 TD
Michigan	Passing	Cade McNamara	9/11, 136 yards, 2 TD
Michigan	Rushing	Blake Corum	14 carries, 111 yards, 1 TD
Michigan	Receiving	Ronnie Bell	1 reception, 76 yards, 1 TD

=== Washington ===
Washington at Michigan

Team	1	2	3	4	Total
Huskies	0	0	3	7	10
• Wolverines	3	7	7	14	31

- Date: September 11
- Location: Michigan Stadium
  Ann Arbor, MI
- Game start: 8:14 p.m. EDT
- Elapsed time: 3:28
- Game attendance: 108,345
- Game weather: 80º F, sunny, SW 10 MPH
- Referee: Michael Cannon
- TV announcers (ABC): Sean McDonough, Todd Blackledge, and Molly McGrath

Scoring summary
1	7:18	MICH	Jake Moody 52-yard field goal	MICH 3–0
2	9:47	MICH	Blake Corum 67-yard run (Jake Moody kick)	MICH 10–0
3	10:52	MICH	Blake Corum 7-yard run (Jake Moody kick)	MICH 17–0
3	5:54	WASH	Peyton Henry 28-yard field goal	MICH 17–3
4	13:56	MICH	Hassan Haskins 6-yard run (Jake Moody kick)	MICH 24–3
3	12:04	WASH	Terrell Bynum 22-yard pass from Dylan Morris (Peyton Harris kick)	MICH 24–10
4	1:48	MICH	Blake Corum 4-yard run (Jake Moody kick)	MICH 31–10

On September 11, Michigan defeated Washington, 31–10, in the tenth ever night game at Michigan Stadium. It was the first meeting between the teams since 2002. The teams had been scheduled to meet in 2020 in Seattle, but that game was postponed due to the COVID-19 pandemic.

Michigan's defense held Washington scoreless in the first half. Michigan began their second possession near midfield after Caden Kolesar returned a punt for 20 yards. Hassan Haskins carried twice to advance the ball to Washington's 34-yard line, and Jake Moody kicked a 52-yard field goal. With 9:47 remaining in the second quarter, Blake Corum ran 67 yards for a touchdown, which made the score 10–0 in favor of Michigan at halftime.

On the opening drive of the second half, Michigan ran the ball eight times (four by Haskins, four by Corum) for 73 yards with Corum scoring on a seven-yard run. Washington responded with a ten-minute, 72-yard drive, ending with a 28-yard field goal by Peyton Henry. Michigan then responded with another long drive, taking the ball 75 yards in seven minutes, Haskins scoring on a six-yard run with 13:56 remaining. Washington responded with another long drive, marching 75 yards and ending with a 22-yard touchdown pass from Dylan Morris to Terrell Bynum. With 1:48 remaining, Michigan added a final touchdown on a four-yard run by Corum.

Michigan had 343 rushing yards in the game (Corum 171 yards, three touchdowns; Haskins 155 yards, one touchdown). Cade McNamara completed seven of 15 passes for 44 yards. The defense gave up 293 passing yards by Dylan Morris but held Washington to 50 rushing yards on 32 carries. Aidan Hutchinson had 2.5 sacks, and David Ojabo had a sack and a fumble recovery.

Statistics	UW	UM
First downs	19	20
Plays–yards	69–343	71–387
Rushes–yards	32–50	56–343
Passing yards	293	44
Passing: comp–att–int	20–37–0	7–15–0
Turnovers		
Time of possession	25:40	34:20

Team	Category	Player	Statistics
Washington	Passing	Dylan Morris	20/37, 293 yards, 1 TD
Washington	Rushing	Richard Newton	12 carries, 24 yards
Washington	Receiving	Terrell Bynum	5 receptions, 115 yards, 1 TD
Michigan	Passing	Cade McNamara	7/15, 44 yards
Michigan	Rushing	Blake Corum	21 carries, 171 yards, 3 TD
Michigan	Receiving	Cornelius Johnson	1 reception, 33 yards

=== Northern Illinois ===
Northern Illinois at No. 25 Michigan

Team	1	2	3	4	Total
Huskies	3	0	0	7	10
• No. 25 Wolverines	14	21	28	0	63

- Date: September 18
- Location: Michigan Stadium
  Ann Arbor, MI
- Game start: 12:01 p.m. EDT
- Elapsed time: 3:06
- Game attendance: 106,263
- Game weather: 70º F, sunny, N 5 MPH
- Referee: Greg Sujack
- TV announcers (BTN): Brandon Gaudin, James Laurinaitis, and Rick Pizzo

Scoring summary
1	11:05	MICH	Cade McNamara 1-yard run (Jake Moody kick)	MICH 7–0
1	6:10	NIU	John Richardson 21-yard field goal	MICH 7–3
1	1:52	MICH	Blake Corum 1-yard run (Jake Moody kick)	MICH 14–3
2	12:55	MICH	Hassan Haskins 1-yard run (Jake Moody kick)	MICH 21–3
2	6:15	MICH	Hassan Haskins 5-yard run (Jake Moody kick)	MICH 28–3
2	1:53	MICH	Cornelius Johnson 87-yard pass from Cade McNamara (Jake Moody kick)	MICH 35–3
3	13:39	MICH	Blake Corum 51-yard run (Jake Moody kick)	MICH 42–3
3	7:36	MICH	Blake Corum 1-yard run (Jake Moody kick)	MICH 49–3
3	6:40	MICH	Donovan Edwards 4-yard run (Jake Moody kick)	MICH 56–3
3	4:13	MICH	Donovan Edwards 58-yard run (Jake Moody kick)	MICH 63–3
4	8:28	NIU	Cole Tucker 9-yard pass from Rocky Lombardi (John Richardson kick)	MICH 63–10

On September 18, Michigan defeated Northern Illinois (NIU), 63–10, before a crowd of 106,263 at Michigan Stadium. The game drew attention as NIU quarterback Rocky Lombardi had played for Michigan State in 2020, leading the Spartans to a 27–24 victory over the Wolverines.

On their opening possession, Michigan took over in NIU territory after A. J. Henning returned a punt 25 yards. Cade McNamara scored on a one-yard run. NIU responded with a 72-yard drive ending with a 21-yard field goal by John Richardson. The Wolverines held NIU scoreless for the rest of the first half, while the Wolverines scored four touchdowns on one-yard runs by Blake Corum and Hassan Haskins, a five-yard run by Haskins, and an 87-yard touchdown pass from McNamara to Cornelius Johnson, which made the score 35–3 in favor of Michigan at half-time.

Michigan broke the game open with 28 points in the third quarter. On the opening drive of the second half, Corum ran 51 yards for a touchdown. After holding NIU to a three-and-out, A. J. Henning returned a punt 32 yards to the NIU 48-yard line. Michigan scored again on a one-yard run by Corum. On the next NIU possession, Gemon Green intercepted a Rocky Lombardi pass and returned it 27 yards to the NIU three-yard line. Donovan Edwards scored on a four-yard run. The defense forced another three-and-out, and Donovan Edwards scored on a 58-yard touchdown run. Michigan led, 63–3, with 4:13 remaining in the third quarter. Michigan emptied their bench and did not score in the fourth quarter. NIU scored the only points of the fourth quarter on a nine-yard pass from Lombardi to Cole Tucker.

Michigan tallied 373 rushing yards in the game, led by Corum with 125 yards and three touchdowns on 13 carries. It was Corum's third consecutive 100-yard rushing game, making him the first Michigan player to accomplish the feat since Denard Robinson in 2011. Cade McNamara completed eight of 11 passes for 191 yards. His 87-yard touchdown pass to Cornelius Johnson was the third longest in program history. The defense held NIU to 46 passing yards and 161 rushing yards. Aidan Hutchinson recorded one sack. A. J. Henning returned five punts for 70 yards.

Statistics	NIU	UM
First downs	11	28
Plays–yards	53–207	65–606
Rushes–yards	36–161	48–373
Passing yards	46	233
Passing: comp–att–int	9–17–1	12–17–0
Turnovers		
Time of possession	29:11	30:49

Team	Category	Player	Statistics
N. Illinois	Passing	Rocky Lombardi	9/17, 46 yards, 1 TD, 1 INT
N. Illinois	Rushing	Rocky Lombardi	7 carries, 71 yards
N. Illinois	Receiving	Tristen Tewes	1 reception, 15 yards
Michigan	Passing	Cade McNamara	8/11, 191 yards, 1 TD
Michigan	Rushing	Blake Corum	13 carries, 125 yards, 3 TD
Michigan	Receiving	Cornelius Johnson	3 receptions, 117 yards, 1 TD

=== Rutgers ===
Rutgers at No. 19 Michigan
(Homecoming)

Team	1	2	3	4	Total
Scarlet Knights	3	0	7	3	13
• No. 19 Wolverines	7	13	0	0	20

- Date: September 25
- Location: Michigan Stadium
  Ann Arbor, MI
- Game start: 3:41 p.m. EDT
- Elapsed time: 3:15
- Game attendance: 106,943
- Game weather: 65º F, sunny, W 15 MPH
- Referee: Ron Snodgrass
- TV announcers (ABC): Sean McDonough, Todd Blackledge, and Molly McGrath

Scoring summary
1	7:16	MICH	Hassan Haskins 1-yard run (Jake Moody kick)	MICH 7–0
1	1:08	RUT	Valentino Ambrosio 40-yard field goal	MICH 7–3
2	14:40	MICH	Hassan Haskins 3-yard run (Jake Moody kick)	MICH 14–3
2	4:03	MICH	Jake Moody 32-yard field goal	MICH 17–3
2	0:02	MICH	Jake Moody 20-yard field goal	MICH 20–3
3	6:30	RUT	Aaron Young 14-yard pass from Noah Vedral (Valentino Ambrosio kick)	MICH 20–10
4	14:09	RUT	Valentino Ambrosio 25-yard field goal	MICH 20–13

On September 25, Michigan defeated Rutgers, 20–13, before a homecoming crowd of 106,943 at Michigan Stadium. It was the seventh consecutive victory for Michigan over Rutgers.

On the game's opening drive, Michigan sustained a 74-yard, seven-and-a half-minute drive, culminating with a one-yard touchdown run by Hassan Haskins. Rutgers responded with a 53-yard drive to the Michigan 22-yard line. Valentino Ambrosio kicked a 40-yard field goal. Michigan then quickly drove 72 yards on a drive that featured passes of 24 yards to Erick All and 38 yards to Roman Wilson . Haskins scored again on a three-yard run with 14:40 remaining in the second quarter. Jake Moody kicked two field goals, from 32 yards, and 20 yards, respectively, in the second quarter, which made the score 20–3 in favor of Michigan at half-time.

Michigan was held scoreless and limited to 47 yards of total offense in the second half. In the third quarter, Rutgers narrowed the lead to 20–10 with a 91-yard, five-and-a-half minute touchdown drive, capped by a 14-yard touchdown pass from Noah Vedral to Aaron Young. Late in the third quarter, Rutgers again drove deep into Michigan territory, and Ambrosio kicked a 25-yard field goal to bring Rutgers within seven points. Rutgers' attempted comeback failed when Michigan forced Rutgers' first turnover of the season. With 1:37 remaining in the game, David Ojabo forced a fumble by Noah Vedral, and Junior Colson recovered the loose ball for Michigan.

Michigan was limited to 275 yards of total offense in the game. Cade McNamara completed nine of 16 passes for 163 yards, and Michigan's ground game was limited to 112 yards. Blake Corum rushed for 68 yards on 21 carries, and Hassan Haskins tallied 41 yards and two touchdowns on 12 carries. Rutgers tallied 352 yards of total offense, out-gaining the Wolverines by 77 yards. Aidan Hutchinson recorded a sack.

Statistics	RU	UM
First downs	21	15
Plays–yards	73–352	54–275
Rushes–yards	42–196	38–112
Passing yards	156	163
Passing: comp–att–int	18–31–0	9–16–0
Turnovers		
Time of possession	32:37	27:23

Team	Category	Player	Statistics
Rutgers	Passing	Noah Vedral	18/31, 156 yards, 1 TD
Rutgers	Rushing	Isiah Pacheco	20 carries, 107 yards
Rutgers	Receiving	Aaron Young	3 receptions, 35 yards, 1 TD
Michigan	Passing	Cade McNamara	9/16, 163 yards
Michigan	Rushing	Blake Corum	21 carries, 68 yards
Michigan	Receiving	Mike Sainristil	1 reception, 51 yards

=== At Wisconsin ===
No. 14 Michigan at Wisconsin

Team	1	2	3	4	Total
• No. 14 Wolverines	7	6	7	18	38
Badgers	0	10	0	7	17

- Date: October 2
- Location: Camp Randall Stadium
  Madison, WI
- Game start: 11:25 a.m. CDT
- Elapsed time: 2:59
- Game attendance: 74,855
- Game weather: 70 °F (21 °C); Sunny; Wind at S 7 MPH
- Referee: John O'Neill
- TV announcers (Fox): Gus Johnson, Joel Klatt, and Jenny Taft

Scoring summary
1	4:17	MICH	Cornelius Johnson 34-yard pass from Cade McNamara (Jake Moody kick)	MICH 7–0
2	13:17	MICH	Jake Moody 26-yard field goal	MICH 10–0
2	2:32	WIS	Collin Larsh 34-yard field goal	MICH 10–3
2	0:27	MICH	Jake Moody 47-yard field goal	MICH 13–3
2	0:07	WIS	Chimere Dike 18-yard pass from Graham Mertz (Collin Larsh field goal)	MICH 13–10
3	8:26	MICH	J. J. McCarthy 1-yard run (Jake Moody kick)	MICH 20–10
4	12:21	MICH	Jake Moody 48-yard field goal	MICH 23–10
4	9:34	MICH	Cornelius Johnson 13-yard pass from Cade McNamara (Cade McNamara pass to Cornelius Johnson)	MICH 31–10
4	5:07	MICH	Daylen Baldwin 56-yard pass from J. J. McCarthy (Jake Moody kick)	MICH 38–10
4	0:32	WIS	Clay Cundiff 25-yard pass from Chase Wolf (Collin Larsh kick)	MICH 38–17

On October 2, Michigan defeated Wisconsin, 38–17, before a crowd of 74,855 at Camp Randall Stadium in Madison, Wisconsin. Michigan had lost to Wisconsin by a 49–11 score in 2020 and had not won a game in Madison since 2001. It was also the first victory for Michigan as an underdog (after 12 defeats) under coach Harbaugh.

In their first two possessions, Michigan turned the ball over on downs and punted. On their third possession, A. J. Henning returned a punt 19 yards to Michigan's 41-yard line. From there, the Wolverines drove 59 yards and scored on 34-yard touchdown pass from Cade McNamara to Cornelius Johnson. At the end of the first quarter, Hunter Wohler fumbled a Brad Robbins punt, and Michigan recovered the ball at the Wisconsin five-yard line. Despite excellent field possession, the Wolverines were unable to punch the ball into the end zone and settled for a 26-yard Jake Moody field goal. Midway through the second quarter, Wisconsin drove 78 yards to the Michigan 16-yard line but had to settle for a 34-yard field goal by Collin Larsh. In the closing minutes of the half, Michigan drove to Wisconsin's 29-yard line, and Moody kicked a 47-yard field goal with 27 seconds remaining in the half. In the final 27 seconds of the half, Wisconsin drove 63 yards as Graham Mertz passed for 38 yards to Chimere Dike and for 18 yards to Dike for a touchdown, which made the score 13–10 in favor of Michigan at half-time.

On the opening drive of the second half, Michigan held Wisconsin to a three-and-out and knocked Mertz out of the game with a sack by Josh Ross and Daxton Hill. Michigan then drove 59 yards in a five-minute drive capped by a one-yard touchdown run by J. J. McCarthy. At the start of the fourth quarter, David Ojabo sacked Wisconsin's backup quarterback Chase Wolf and forced a fumble that was recovered by Christopherhinton Hinton at the Badgers' 38-yard line. Moody kicked a 48-yard field goal. On the next play from scrimmage, Daxton Hill intercepted a Chase Wolf pass and Michigan took over at the Wisconsin 35-yard line. From there, Cade McNamara completed passes to Erick All for 19 yards and to Cornelius Johnson for 13 yards and a touchdown. The Wolverines added a two-point conversion on a pass from McNamara to Johnson. On Michigan's next possession, J. J. McCarthy threw a 56-yard touchdown pass to Daylen Baldwin with 5:07 remaining in the game. With 1:37 remaining in the game, Michigan's third-string quarterback Alan Bowman was intercepted, and Wisconsin took over at the Wolverines' 43-yard line. Chase Wolf threw a touchdown pass to Clay Cundiff with 0:32 remaining.

Michigan was limited to 112 rushing yards in the game. McNamara and McCarthy combined for 253 passing yards and three touchdowns. On defense, the Wolverines held the Badgers to 42 rushing yards and 167 passing yards. The defense also tallied a season-high six sacks, including two-and-a-half sacks for David Ojabo. During Wisconsin's Jump Around between the third and fourth quarters, Michigan players flooded onto the field, dancing and waving towels.

Statistics	UM	UW
First downs	15	12
Plays–yards	74–365	56–210
Rushes–yards	44–112	32–43
Passing yards	253	167
Passing: comp–att–int	18–30–1	11–23–1
Turnovers		
Time of possession	34:38	25:22

Team	Category	Player	Statistics
Michigan	Passing	Cade McNamara	17/28, 197 yards, 2 TD
Michigan	Rushing	Hassan Haskins	19 carries, 47 yards
Michigan	Receiving	Roman Wilson	6 receptions, 81 yards
Wisconsin	Passing	Graham Mertz	8/15, 115 yards, 1 TD
Wisconsin	Rushing	Braelon Allen	5 carries, 19 yards
Wisconsin	Receiving	Chimere Dike	2 receptions, 54 yards, 1 TD

=== At Nebraska ===
No. 9 Michigan at Nebraska

Team	1	2	3	4	Total
• No. 9 Wolverines	0	13	6	13	32
Cornhuskers	0	0	22	7	29

- Date: October 9
- Location: Memorial Stadium
  Lincoln, NE
- Game start: 6:44 p.m. CDT
- Elapsed time: 3:37
- Game attendance: 87,380
- Game weather: 77º F, cloudy, S 6 MPH
- Referee: Reggie Smith
- TV announcers (ABC): Sean McDonough, Todd Blackledge, and Molly McGrath

Scoring summary
2	9:52	MICH	Jake Moody 35-yard field goal	MICH 3–0
2	3:19	MICH	Jake Moody 21-yard field goal	MICH 6–0
2	0:09	MICH	Hassan Haskins 3-yard run	MICH 13–0
3	12:49	NEB	Austin Allen 46-yard pass from Adrian Martinez (Connor Culp kick)	MICH 13–7
3	3:36	MICH	Hassan Haskins 3-yard run (two-point pass conversion failed)	MICH 19–7
3	1:24	NEB	Rahmir Johnson 41-yard pass from Adrian Martinez (Connor Culp kick)	MICH 19–14
3	0:52	NEB	Levi Falck 13-yard pass from Adrian Martinez (Martinez run for two-point conversion)	NEB 22–19
4	11:21	MICH	Blake Corum 29-yard run (Jake Moody kick)	MICH 26–22
4	7:08	NEB	Adrian Martinez 5-yard run (Connor Culp kick)	NEB 29–26
4	3:00	MICH	Jake Moody 31-yard field goal	Tied 29–29
4	1:24	MICH	Jake Moody 39-yard field goal	MICH 32–29

On October 9, Michigan defeated Nebraska, 32–29, before a crowd of 87,380 in Lincoln, Nebraska. The schools last faced each other in 2018, when Michigan won, 56–10. The victory was Michigan's first in three road games against Nebraska.

After holding Michigan to a three-and-out on the opening drive, Nebraska drove 78 yards to the Michigan three-yard line, but Michigan stopped Adrian Martinez for a one-yard loss on fourth-and-goal. Neither team scored in the opening quarter.

In the second quarter, Michigan scored 13 points and again held Nebraska scoreless. On the opening drive of the quarter, Daxton Hill intercepted a Martinez pass at Nebraska's 35-yard line. Michigan then drove to the 17-yard line, and Jake Moody kicked a 35-yard field goal. On Michigan's next possession, the Wolverines drove 87 yards (including a 48-yard pass from Cade McNamara to Mike Sainristil) ending at the Nebraska one-yard line. Michigan then settled for another field goal. Michigan got the ball back with 1:27 remaining in the half and drove 76 yards as McNamara completed five passes and Blake Corum ran 26 yards to the Nebraska 15-yard line. A pass interference penalty moved the ball to the three-yard line, and Hassan Haskins scored on a three-yard run with nine seconds left in the half, which made the score 13–0 in favor of Michigan at half-time.

Nebraska scored 22 points in the third quarter to take a 22–19 lead. On the opening drive of the second half, the Cornhuskers drove 79 yards and scored on a 46-yard touchdown pass from Martinez to Austin Allen. Later in the quarter, Michigan drove 91 yards on 10 plays, culminating in a three-yard touchdown run by Haskins. Michigan's attempt at a two-point conversion failed. Nebraska responded on their next possession with a 75-yard drive, ending with a 41-yard touchdown pass from Martinez to Rahmir Johnson. With 59 seconds remaining in the third quarter, Nebraska's Deontai Williams intercepted a Cade McNamara pass and returned it 20 yards to the Michigan 13-yard line. On the next play from scrimmage, Martinez threw a 13-yard touchdown pass to Levi Falck. Martinez then ran for a two-point conversion.

On the opening drive of the fourth quarter, Michigan drove 75 yards in 10 plays, ending with a 29-yard touchdown run by Blake Corum. Nebraska then responded with a 75-yard drive ending with a five-yard touchdown run by Martinez. Halfway through the fourth quarter, Michigan drove 69 yards to the Nebraska 13-yard line, and Jake Moody kicked a 31-yard field goal to tie the game with 3:00 minutes remaining. On the following drive, Brad Hawkins forced a fumble by Martinez, with Hawkins recovering the ball and returning it 19 yards to the Nebraska 18-yard line. Moody kicked a game-winning, 39-yard field goal with 1:24 remaining in the game.

Michigan had 459 yards of total offense in the game. Cade McNamara completed 22 of 38 passes for 255 yards and one interception. Hassan Haskins rushed for 123 yards and two touchdowns, and Blake Corum added 89 yards and one touchdown. Nebraska quarterback Adrian Martinez completed 18 of 28 passes for 291 yards, three touchdowns, and an interception. David Ojabo had one sack in the game.

Statistics	UM	NU
First downs	26	19
Plays–yards	81–459	60–431
Rushes–yards	42–204	32–140
Passing yards	255	291
Passing: comp–att–int	22–39–1	18–28–1
Turnovers		
Time of possession	34:24	25:36

Team	Category	Player	Statistics
Michigan	Passing	Cade McNamara	22/38, 255 yards
Michigan	Rushing	Hassan Haskins	21 carries, 123 yards, 2 TD
Michigan	Receiving	Daylen Baldwin	6 receptions, 64 yards
Nebraska	Passing	Adrian Martinez	18/28, 291 yards, 3 TD
Nebraska	Rushing	Rahmir Johnson	17 carries, 67 yards
Nebraska	Receiving	Rahmir Johnson	6 receptions, 105 yards, TD

=== Northwestern ===
Northwestern at No. 6 Michigan
(George Jewett Trophy)

Team	1	2	3	4	Total
Wildcats	0	7	0	0	7
• No. 6 Wolverines	0	10	17	6	33

- Date: October 23
- Location: Michigan Stadium
  Ann Arbor, MI
- Game start: 12:05 p.m. EDT
- Elapsed time: 3:19
- Game attendance: 109,449
- Game weather: 47º F, sunny, W 10 MPH
- Referee: Jeffrey Servinski
- TV announcers (Fox): Gus Johnson, Joel Klatt, and Jenny Taft

Scoring summary
2	12:49	MICH	Blake Corum 1-yard run (Jake Moody kick)	MICH 7–0
2	2:33	MICH	Jake Moody 20-yard field goal	MICH 10–0
2	2:22	NW	Evan Hull 75-yard run	MICH 10–7
3	11:36	MICH	Blake Corum 5-yard run (Jake Moody kick)	MICH 17–7
3	4:50	MICH	Hassan Haskins 13-yard run (Jake Moody kick)	MICH 24–7
3	3:00	MICH	Jake Moody 44-yard field goal	MICH 27–7
4	13:20	MICH	Hassan Haskins 4-yard run (Two-point conversion failed)	MICH 33–7

After a bye week, Michigan defeated Northwestern, 33–7, before a crowd of 109,449 at Michigan Stadium. For the first time, the teams played for the newly created George Jewett Trophy, honoring the first black player on both teams. Michigan and Northwestern had not played since 2018.

The game began with five drives ending in punts and a scoreless first quarter. Late in the first and into the second quarter, Michigan drove 79 yards in 13 plays covering eight-and-a-half minutes. Blake Corum scored on a one-yard run. Michigan mounted another long drive (55 yards, eight-and-a-half minutes) ending with a 20-yard field goal by Jake Moody. Northwestern responded with a quick-strike, 75-yard touchdown run from Evan Hull. After Northwester's touchdown, Michigan drove 75 yards in the final two minutes of the half but Mike Sainristil fumbled at the two-yard line.

On the opening possession of the second half, Michigan drove 74 yards. Blake Corum accounted for 45 of the yards on four carries and scored on a five-yard run. Ryan Hilinski then led Northwestern on a 59-yard drive but Charlie Kuhbander missed a 39-yard field goal attempt. With six minutes remaining in the third quarter, Cornelius Johnson blocked a Northwestern punt, and Caden Kolesaar returned the ball nine yards to the Wildcats' 24-yard line. Michigan scored on a 13-yard touchdown run by Hassan Haskins. The Wolverines added a 44-yard Jake Moody field goal at the end of the third quarter to extend Michigan's lead to 27–7.

On the first play of the fourth quarter, D. J. Turner intercepted a Hilinski pass, returning it 23 yards to the Northwestern 15-yard line. Haskins scored on a four-yard run, and Michigan's attempt for a two point conversion failed. Both teams traded fumbles, and Jake Moody missed a 47-yard field goal with 4:17 remaining.

Michigan rushed for 294 yards in the game, including 119 by Corum and 110 by Haskins. McNamara and McCarthy combined for 163 passing yards. On defense, the Wolverines held the Wildcats to 233 yards (133 passing, 100 rushing). Aidan Hutchinson and David Ojabo shared a sack.

Statistics	NW	UM
First downs	10	28
Plays–yards	55–233	86–457
Rushes–yards	23–100	54–294
Passing yards	133	163
Passing: comp–att–int	16–32–1	22–32–0
Turnovers		
Time of possession	20:41	39:19

Team	Category	Player	Statistics
Northwestern	Passing	Ryan Hilinski	14/29, 114 yards, 1 INT
Northwestern	Rushing	Evan Hull	6 carries, 81 yards, 1 TD
Northwestern	Receiving	Malik Washington	6 receptions, 63 yards
Michigan	Passing	Cade McNamara	20/27, 129 yards
Michigan	Rushing	Blake Corum	19 carries, 119 yards, 2 TD
Michigan	Receiving	Erick All	5 receptions, 34 yards

=== At No. 8 Michigan State ===
No. 6 Michigan at No. 8 Michigan State
(Paul Bunyan Trophy)

Team	1	2	3	4	Total
No. 6 Wolverines	10	13	7	3	33
• No. 8 Spartans	0	14	8	15	37

- Date: October 30
- Location: Spartan Stadium
  East Lansing, MI
- Game start: 12:05 p.m. EDT
- Elapsed time: 3:59
- Game attendance: 76,549
- Game weather: 50º F, cloudy, NE 5 MPH
- Referee: Ron Snodgrass
- TV announcers (Fox): Gus Johnson, Joel Klatt, and Jenny Taft

Scoring summary
1	11:03	MICH	Andrel Anthony 93-yard pass from Cade McNamara (Jake Moody]kick)	MICH 7–0
1	1:18	MICH	Jake Moody 26-yard field goal	MICH 10–0
2	14:52	MSU	Kenneth Walker III 27-yard run (Matt Coghlin kick)	MICH 10–7
2	9:18	MICH	Jake Moody 38-yard field goal	MICH 13–7
2	7:16	MSU	Kenneth Walker III 8-yard run (Matt Coghlin kick)	MSU 14–13
2	3:45	MICH	Andrel Anthony 17-yard pass from J. J. McCarthy (Jake Moody kick)	MICH 20–14
2	0:02	MICH	Jake Moody 35-yard field goal	MICH 23–14
3	6:47	MICH	Mike Sainristil 19-yard pass from Cade McNamara (Jake Moody kick)	MICH 30–14
3	3:58	MSU	Kenneth Walker III 1-yard run (Payton Thorne pass to Tre Mosley)	MICH 30–22
4	12:29	MSU	Kenneth Walker III 58-yard run (Payton Thorne pass to Jayden Reed)	Tied 30–30
4	9:20	MICH	Jake Moody 36-yard field goal	MICH 33–30
4	5:08	MSU	Kenneth Walker III 23-yard run (Matt Coghlin kick)	MSU 37–33

After hosting Northwestern, Michigan traveled to East Lansing to face their in-state rival, the Michigan State Spartans, in the battle for the Paul Bunyan Trophy. Last season, Michigan was upset by Michigan State 27–24.

Michigan lost to Michigan State 37–33. Michigan scored ten points in the first quarter on a 93-yard touchdown pass from Cade McNamara to Andrel Anthony and a 26-yard field goal by Jake Moody. Michigan State responded with 14 points in the second quarter on two touchdown runs from Kenneth Walker III from 27 yards, and eight yards, respectively. Michigan scored 13 points on a 17-yard touchdown pass from J. J. McCarthy to Andrel Anthony and two field goals by Moody from 38 yards, and 35 yards, respectively, which made the score 23–14 in favor of Michigan at half-time. The teams exchanged touchdowns in the third quarter, first a 19-yard touchdown pass from McNamara to Mike Sainristil for Michigan, then a one-yard touchdown run from Walker III and a two-point conversion pass from Payton Thorne to Tre Mosley for Michigan State. In the fourth quarter Michigan State scored on a 58-yard touchdown run from Walker III and a two-point conversion pass from Thorne to Jayden Reed to tie the game. Michigan responded with a 36-yard field goal by Moody to regain the lead. Michigan State responded with a 23-yard touchdown run from Walker III.

Andrel Anthony scored a 93-yard touchdown reception on his first career touch, this was the longest first-career reception for any player at Michigan. This was also the second-longest passing touchdown in program history.

Statistics	UM	MSU
First downs	26	20
Plays–yards	82–552	66–395
Rushes–yards	34–146	38–199
Passing yards	406	196
Passing: comp–att–int	31–48–1	19–30–2
Turnovers		
Time of possession	34:50	25:10

Team	Category	Player	Statistics
Michigan	Passing	Cade McNamara	28/44, 383 yards, 2 TD
Michigan	Rushing	Hassan Haskins	14 carries, 59 yards
Michigan	Receiving	Andrel Anthony	6 receptions, 155 yards, 2 TD
MSU	Passing	Payton Thorne	19/30, 196 yards
MSU	Rushing	Kenneth Walker III	23 carries, 197 yards, 5 TD
MSU	Receiving	Jayden Reed	6 receptions, 80 yards

=== Indiana ===
Indiana at No. 7 Michigan

Team	1	2	3	4	Total
Hoosiers	0	7	0	0	7
• No. 7 Wolverines	3	14	6	6	29

- Date: November 6
- Location: Michigan Stadium
  Ann Arbor, MI
- Game start: 7:35 p.m. EDT
- Elapsed time: 3:19
- Game attendance: 109,890
- Game weather: 45º F, sunny, SW 5 MPH
- Referee: Jerry McGinn
- TV announcers (Fox): Joe Davis and Brock Huard

Scoring summary
1	0:00	MICH	Jake Moody 34-yard field goal	MICH 3–0
2	12:35	MICH	Hassan Haskins 2-yard run (Jake Moody kick)	MICH 10–0
2	8:18	IND	Chris Childers 1-yard Run (Charles Campbell kick)	MICH 10–7
2	6:28	MICH	Luke Schoonmaker 12-yard pass from Cade McNamara (Jake Moody kick)	MICH 17–7
3	5:44	MICH	Jake Moody 32-yard field goal	MICH 20–7
3	1:17	MICH	Jake Moody 34-yard field goal	MICH 23–7
4	13:39	MICH	Luke Schoonmaker 8-yard pass from Cade McNamara	MICH 29–7

On November 6, Michigan defeated Indiana, 29–7, before a crowd of 109,890 at Michigan Stadium. Michigan lost to Indiana, 38–21, in 2020, but Indiana had not won at Michigan Stadium since 1967.

The first quarter was scoreless until the final play of the quarter when Jake Moody kicked a 34-yard field goal. Three plays later, David Ojabo sacked Donaven McCulley, causing McCulley to fumble. Christopher Hinton recovered the ball at the Indiana 24-yard line, and Hassan Haskins took a short pass for 20 yards to the four-yard line and, two plays later, ran two yards for a touchdown. Indiana responded with their only scoring drive of the game, as Donaven McCulley completed two passes to Peyton Hendershot and ran 24 yards to the Michigan two-yard line. Chris Childress carried it across to bring the Hoosiers within three points. On the next drive, Haskins broke away for his longest gain of the year, a 62-yard run down the left sideline to the Indiana 13-yard line. Two plays later, Cade McNamara threw a 12-yard touchdown pass to Luke Schoonmaker, which made the score 17–7 in favor of Michigan at half-time.

Michigan added the only points in the third quarter on two field goals by Moody, from 32 yards, and 34 yards, respectively. On Michigan's first play from scrimmage in the fourth quarter, McNamara passed for 50 yards to Cornelius Johnson at the Indiana 10-yard line. Two plays later, he threw an eight-yard touchdown pass to Schoonmaker. McNamara was sacked on attempt at a two-point conversion. Late in the fourth quarter, J. J. McCarthy threw his first interception of the year on a pass that tipped high into the air off the hands of Cornelius Johnson.

Michigan rushed for 188 yards, including 168 yards and a touchdown by Haskins. McNamara and J. J. McCarthy combined for 223 passing yards, two touchdowns, and one interception. The defense held Indiana to 195 yards of total offense (88 passing and 107 rushing). David Ojabo recorded a sack and his Big Ten-leading fourth forced fumble of the season.

Statistics	IU	UM
First downs	11	19
Plays–yards	60–195	66–411
Rushes–yards	35–107	38–188
Passing yards	88	223
Passing: comp–att–int	10–25–0	15–28–1
Turnovers		
Time of possession	27:24	32:36

Team	Category	Player	Statistics
Indiana	Passing	Donaven McCulley	10/24, 88 yards
Indiana	Rushing	Donaven McCulley	14 carries, 37 yards
Indiana	Receiving	Peyton Hendershot	3 receptions, 34 yards
Michigan	Passing	Cade McNamara	10/18, 168 yards, 2 TD
Michigan	Rushing	Hassan Haskins	27 carries, 168 yards, TD
Michigan	Receiving	Cornelius Johnson	5 receptions, 108 yards

=== At Penn State ===
No. 6 Michigan at Penn State

Team	1	2	3	4	Total
• No. 6 Wolverines	0	7	7	7	21
Nittany Lions	3	3	0	11	17

- Date: November 13
- Location: Beaver Stadium
  State College, PA
- Game start: 12:07 p.m. EST
- Elapsed time: 3:27
- Game attendance: 109,534
- Game weather: 40º F, cloudy, W 15 MPH
- Referee: Michael Cannon
- TV announcers (ABC): Sean McDonough, Dan Orlovsky, and Molly McGrath

Scoring summary
1	9:56	PSU	Jordan Stout 42-yard field goal	PSU 3–0
2	5:49	MICH	Roman Wilson 21-yard pass from Cade McNamara (Jake Moody kick)	MICH 7–3
2	0:31	PSU	Jordan Stout 42-yard field goal	MICH 7–6
3	11:50	MICH	Roman Wilson 1-yard pass from Cade McNamara (Jake Moody kick)	MICH 14–6
4	7:35	PSU	Tyler Warren 2-yard pass from Sean Clifford (Sean Clifford pass to Jahan Dotson)	Tied 14–14
4	5:55	PSU	Jordan Stout 31-yard field goal	PSU 17–14
4	3:29	MICH	Erick All 47-yard pass from Cade McNamara (Jake Moody kick)	MICH 21–17

On November 13, Michigan defeated Penn State, 21–17, at Beaver Stadium in State College, Pennsylvania. On the game's opening drive, the Nittany Lions drove 51 yards in 14 plays lasting over five minutes. The drive stalled at Michigan's 15-yard line, and Jordan Stout kicked a 42-yard field goal. After holding Michigan to a three-and-out, Penn State drove to the Michigan two-yard line, but Stout fumbled, and Daxton Hill recovered the ball. In the second quarter, Michigan drove 90 yards in 15 plays and over seven minutes, culminating with a 21-yard touchdown pass from Cade McNamara to Roman Wilson. With 37 second remaining in the first half, David Ojabo sacked Penn State quarterback Sean Clifford and forced a fumble at the Michigan 25-yard line. Clifford recovered his own fumble, and Stout kicked another 52-yard field goal, which made the score 7–6 in favor of Michigan at half-time.

On the opening drive of the second half, Michigan drove 75 yards on nine plays, ending with a one-yard touchdown pass from McNamara to Wilson. In the fourth quarter, Penn State drove 53 yards in 15 plays and scored on a two-yard touchdown pass from Clifford to Tyler Warren. Clifford then threw to Jahan Dotson for a two-point conversion that tied the score at 14–14. On the ensuing possession, McNamara was sacked and fumbled, Derrick Tangelo recovering at Michigan's 16-yard line. The Michigan defense held, and Penn State was forced to settle for a 31-yard field goal by Stout, giving the Nittany Lions a three-point lead with 5:55 remaining in the game. Michigan then drove 75 yards, scoring with 3:29 remaining on a 47-yard touchdown pass from McNamara to Erick All.

Michigan's defense registered 12 tackles for loss (TFL), including seven sacks (three by Aidan Hutchinson and two by David Ojabo).

Statistics	UM	PSU
First downs	21	20
Plays–yards	70–361	86–332
Rushes–yards	41–144	42–109
Passing yards	217	233
Passing: comp–att–int	19–29–0	24–44–0
Turnovers		
Time of possession	30:20	29:40

Team	Category	Player	Statistics
Michigan	Passing	Cade McNamara	19/29, 217 yards, 3 TD
Michigan	Rushing	Hassan Haskins	31 carries, 156 yards
Michigan	Receiving	Erick All	4 receptions, 64 yards, TD
Penn State	Passing	Sean Clifford	23/43, 205 yards, TD
Penn State	Rushing	Keyvone Lee	20 carries, 88 yards
Penn State	Receiving	Parker Washington	4 receptions, 92 yards

=== At Maryland ===
No. 6 Michigan at Maryland

Team	1	2	3	4	Total
• No. 6 Wolverines	14	10	28	7	59
Terrapins	0	3	15	0	18

- Date: November 20
- Location: Maryland Stadium
  College Park, MD
- Game start: 3:38 p.m. EST
- Elapsed time: 3:25
- Game attendance: 36,181
- Game weather: 47º F, cloudy, SE 5 MPH
- Referee: Ron Snodgrass
- TV announcers (BTN): Brandon Gaudin, James Laurinaitis, and Rick Pizzo

Scoring summary
1	7:09	MICH	Luke Schoonmaker 2-yard pass from Cade McNamara (Jake Moody kick)	MICH 7–0
1	1:08	MICH	Hassan Haskins 1-yard run (Jake Moody kick)	MICH 14–0
2	9:37	UMD	Joseph Petrino 31-yard field goal	MICH 14–3
2	2:51	MICH	Mike Sainristil 13-yard pass from J. J. McCarthy (Jake Moody kick)	MICH 21–3
2	0:04	MICH	Jake Moody 39-yard field goal	MICH 24–3
3	8:50	MICH	Hassan Haskins 1-yard run (Jake Moody kick)	MICH 31–3
3	4:51	UMD	Carlos Carriere 7-yard pass from Taulia Tagovailoa (Joseph Petrino kick)	MICH 31–10
3	4:38	MICH	A. J. Henning 81-yard kickoff return (Jake Moody kick)	MICH 38–10
3	2:22	UMD	Taulia Tagovailoa 17-yard run (Taulia Tagovailoa rush)	MICH 38–18
3	1:33	MICH	Donovan Edwards 77-yard pass from Cade McNamara (Jake Moody kick)	MICH 45–18
3	0:34	MICH	D. J. Turner 42-yard interception return (Jake Moody kick)	MICH 52–18
4	13:40	MICH	J. J. McCarthy 5-yard run (Jake Moody kick)	MICH 59–18

On November 20, Michigan defeated Maryland, 59–18, at College Park, Maryland. On their first possession, Maryland drove to the Michigan 30-yard line, and Joseph Petrino missed a 48-yard field goal attempt. Michigan then drove 70 yards, scoring on a two-yard touchdown pass from Cade McNamara to Luke Schoonmaker. Later in the first quarter, A. J. Henning returned a punt 14 yards to the Maryland 45-yard line. Michigan drove from there and scored on a one-yard run by Hassan Haskins to take a 14–0 lead.

Maryland responded with a 17-play, 68-yard drive that consumed six-and-a-half minutes. The Terrapins were stopped at the 13-yard line and settled for a 31-yard field goal by Petrino. With 4:00 remaining in the half, J. J. McCarthy led the Wolverines on a four-play 42-yard touchdown drive with a 14-yard run, a 13-yard pass to Cornelius Johnson, and a 13-yard touchdown pass to Mike Sainristil. In the final minute-and-a-half, Michigan drove 42 yards to the Maryland six-yard line, but were backed up by a personal foul penalty, and Jake Moody kicked a 39-yard field with four seconds remaining, which made the score 24–3 in favor of Michigan at half-time.

The teams combined for six touchdowns (four by Michigan, two by Maryland) in the third quarter. Michigan struck first with a 56-yard drive, capped by a one-yard touchdown run by Haskins. Maryland responded with their own 74-yard drive capped by a seven-yard touchdown pass from Tagovailoa to Carlos Carrier. A. J. Henning returned the ensuing kickoff 81 yards for a touchdown. Maryland then drove 75 yards with Tagovailoa scoring on a 17-yard run; Tagovailoa also ran for a two-point conversion. Donovan Edwards then ran 77 yards for a touchdown. With 34 seconds left in the quarter, D. J. Turner intercepted a Tagovailoa pass and returned it 42 yards for a touchdown.

Michigan scored once more in the fourth quarter after stopping Maryland on a fourth-and-one pass from the Maryland 34-yard line. From there, McCarthy passed to Edwards at the five-yard line, and McCarthy scored on a five-yard run.

Michigan tallied over 500 yards of total offense in the game (352 passing and 151 rushing). Haskins gained 78 yards and passed the 1,000-yard mark, the 22nd player in program history to eclipse 1,000 rushing yards in a single season. With touchdowns on offense, defense and in the return game, Michigan scored in all three phases for the first time since October 10, 2015, against Northwestern. The touchdowns were Michigan's first of the season on special teams and defense. The Wolverines had two sacks in the game, one by Vincent Gray and the other by TJ Guy.

Statistics	UM	UMD
First downs	24	20
Plays–yards	75–503	77–359
Rushes–yards	35–151	44–181
Passing yards	352	178
Passing: comp–att–int	29–40–0	19–33–1
Turnovers		
Time of possession	24:53	27:56

Team	Category	Player	Statistics
Michigan	Passing	Cade McNamara	21/28, 259 yards, 2 TD
Michigan	Rushing	Hassan Haskins	20 carries, 78 yards, 2 TD
Michigan	Receiving	Donovan Edwards	10 receptions, 170 yards, 1 TD
Maryland	Passing	Taulia Tagovailoa	19/33, 178 yards, 1 TD, 1 INT
Maryland	Rushing	Tayon Fleet-Davis	11 carries, 71 yards
Maryland	Receiving	Carlos Carriere	4 receptions, 53 yards, 1 TD

=== No. 2 Ohio State ===
No. 2 Ohio State at No. 5 Michigan
(The Game)

Team	1	2	3	4	Total
No. 2 Buckeyes	3	10	0	14	27
• No. 5 Wolverines	7	7	14	14	42

- Date: November 27
- Location: Michigan Stadium
  Ann Arbor, MI
- Game start: 12:14 p.m. EST
- Elapsed time: 3:21
- Game attendance: 111,156
- Game weather: 29º F, snow, SE 5 MPH
- Referee: Larry Smith
- TV announcers (Fox): Gus Johnson, Joel Klatt, and Jenny Taft

Scoring summary
1	10:12	MICH	A. J. Henning 14-yard run (Jake Moody kick)	MICH 7–0
1	3:36	OSU	Noah Ruggles 31-yard field goal	MICH 7–3
2	9:12	OSU	Garrett Wilson 25-yard pass from C. J. Stroud (Noah Ruggles kick)	OSU 10–7
2	3:51	MICH	Hassan Haskins 1-yard run (Jake Moody kick)	MICH 14–10
2	0:09	OSU	Noah Ruggles 30-yard field goal	MICH 14–13
3	11:50	MICH	Hassan Haskins 13-yard run (Jake Moody kick)	MICH 21–13
3	5:49	MICH	Hassan Haskins 1-yard run (Jake Moody kick)	MICH 28–13
4	14:05	OSU	TreVeyon Henderson 1-yard run (Noah Ruggles kick)	MICH 28–20
4	9:14	MICH	Hassan Haskins 2-yard run (Jake Moody kick)	MICH 35–20
4	4:45	OSU	TreVeyon Henderson 10-yard pass from C. J. Stroud (Noah Ruggles kick)	MICH 35–27
4	2:17	MICH	Hassan Haskins 4-yard run (Jake Moody kick)	MICH 42–27

On November 27, Michigan hosted their arch-rivals, the Ohio State Buckeyes, in the 117th playing of "The Game". The two teams last played each other in 2019 when Michigan lost to Ohio State 56–27. The two teams were scheduled to play each at the end of the 2020 season; however, the game was cancelled due to COVID-19 complications at Michigan, marking the first time that "The Game" was not played since 1917.

Michigan defeated Ohio State 42–27. Michigan opened the scoring in the first quarter on a 14-yard touchdown run from A. J. Henning. Ohio State responded with a 31-yard field goal by Noah Ruggles. In the second quarter, Ohio State took their only lead of the game on a 25-yard touchdown pass from C. J. Stroud to Garrett Wilson. Michigan responded with a one-yard touchdown run from Hassan Haskins. Ohio State scored the final points of the quarter on a 30-yard field goal by Ruggles, which made the score 14–13 in favor of Michigan at half-time. Michigan scored 14 points in the third quarter on two touchdown runs from Haskins, from 13 yards, and one yard, respectively. Ohio State scored 14 points in the fourth quarter on a one-yard touchdown run from TreVeyon Henderson and a 10-yard touchdown pass from Stroud to Henderson. Michigan scored 14 points in the quarter on two touchdown runs from Haskins, from two yards, and four yards, respectively.

Michigan earned their first victory over Ohio State since 2011, exactly ten years and one day since their last victory, and marked their first win over the Buckeyes in the Jim Harbaugh era. Hassan Haskins rushed for 169 yards, his sixth game of the year with over 100 yards rushing. Haskins' five rushing touchdowns against the Buckeyes was the most by any running back in the rivalry's history. The performance took him to a team-leading 18 touchdowns on the season and tied him for second in program history for single-season rushing touchdowns with Anthony Thomas and Chris Perry. Haskins' five rushing touchdowns also tied the Michigan single-game record set by Ron Johnson against Wisconsin in 1968. Michigan's defense held Ohio State to just 64 yards rushing, marking Ohio State's lowest rushing total on the season and just the second time all season under 100 rushing yards. With three sacks in the game Aidan Hutchinson set the Michigan single-season record with 13.0.

Statistics	OSU	UM
First downs	23	24
Plays–yards	79–458	61–487
Rushes–yards	30–64	41–297
Passing yards	394	190
Passing: comp–att–int	34–49–0	14–20–1
Turnovers		
Time of possession	31:48	28:12

Team	Category	Player	Statistics
OSU	Passing	C. J. Stroud	34/49, 394 yards, 2 TD
OSU	Rushing	TreVeyon Henderson	17 carries, 74 yards, 1 TD
OSU	Receiving	Jaxon Smith-Njigba	11 receptions, 127 yards
Michigan	Passing	Cade McNamara	13/19, 159 yards, 1 INT
Michigan	Rushing	Hassan Haskins	28 carries, 169 yards, 5 TD
Michigan	Receiving	Roman Wilson	2 receptions, 55 yards

=== Vs. No. 13 Iowa—Big Ten Championship Game ===
No. 2 Michigan vs. No. 13 Iowa

Team	1	2	3	4	Total
• No. 2 Wolverines	14	0	7	21	42
No. 13 Hawkeyes	3	0	0	0	3

- Date: December 4
- Location: Lucas Oil Stadium
  Indianapolis, IN
- Game start: 8:19 p.m. EST
- Elapsed time: 3:23
- Game attendance: 67,183
- Game weather: Indoors
- Referee: Michael Cannon
- TV announcers (Fox): Gus Johnson, Joel Klatt, and Jenny Taft

Scoring summary
1	6:38	MICH	Blake Corum 67-yard run (Jake Moody kick)	MICH 7–0
1	5:27	MICH	Roman Wilson 75-yard pass from Donovan Edwards (Jake Moody kick)	MICH 14–0
1	1:26	IOWA	Caleb Shudak 22-yard field goal	MICH 14–3
3	8:23	MICH	Hassan Haskins 4-yard run (Jake Moody kick)	MICH 21–3
4	11:16	MICH	Hassan Haskins 1-yard run (Jake Moody kick)	MICH 28–3
4	5:24	MICH	Erick All 5-yard pass from Cade McNamara (Jake Moody kick)	MICH 35–3
4	1:25	MICH	Donovan Edwards 1-yard run (Jake Moody kick)	MICH 42–3

With their victory over Ohio State, the Wolverines advanced to the Big Ten Championship Game for the first time in program history. They faced Iowa, each team having last won a Big Ten championship in 2004 when they shared the title.

The championship game was played on December 4 at Lucas Oil Stadium in Indianapolis. Michigan, ranked No. 2, defeated No. 13 Iowa, 42–3. On their first drive of the game, Iowa drove 59 yards on 10 plays to the Michigan 12-yard line, but Caleb Shudak missed a 33-yard field goal attempt. Blake Corum then ran 67 yards for a touchdown with 6:38 remaining in the first quarter. After holding Iowa to a three-and-out, Michigan scored again as Cade McNamara threw a backwards pass to Donovan Edwards who threw to Roman Wilson for a 75-yard touchdown strike down the right sideline. On the next possession, Iowa drove 71 yards to Michigan's seven-yard line and settled for a 22-yard field goal by Caleb Shudak. At the end of the first quarter, A. J. Henning ran 29 yards to the Iowa 46, but McNamara then threw an interception picked by Jack Campbell who returned the ball to the Iowa 33-yard line. Neither team was able to mount a scoring drive in the second quarter, and Michigan led, 14–3, at halftime.

In the third quarter, Michigan drove 82 yard in 10 plays, culminating in a four-yard touchdown run by Hassan Haskins. Early in the fourth quarter, Cornelius Johnson blocked an Iowa punt, and Michigan took over at Iowa's 36-yard line. J. J. McCarthy then led a 36-yard touchdown drive culminating in a one-yard run by Haskins. On their next possession, the Wolverines drove 81 yards on eight plays capped by a five-yard touchdown pass from McNamara to Erick All with 5:24 remaining in the game. With 4:21 remaining, Caden Kolesar intercepted an Alex Padilla pass and returned it to the Iowa 36. A pass interference penalty moved the ball to the three-yard line, and Edwards scored on a one-yard run with 1:25 remaining.

With the win Michigan achieved their first 12-win season since 1997, and won their first conference title since 2004. With Edwards' passing touchdown in the first quarter, he became the first player to score touchdowns rushing, receiving, and passing in a single season since Vincent Smith in 2011. With two rushing touchdowns in the game, Haskins set the modern, single-season program record with 20 rushing touchdowns, surpassing the previous record of 19 set by Ron Johnson in 1968. With a sack in the game, Aidan Hutchinson increased his single-season program record with 14.0 sacks on the season, and was selected as the most valuable player of the championship game.

Statistics	MICH	IOWA
First downs	21	15
Plays–yards	62–461	71–279
Rushes–yards	34–211	33–104
Passing yards	250	175
Passing: comp–att–int	18–28–2	19–38–1
Turnovers		
Time of possession	28:21	31:39

Team	Category	Player	Statistics
Michigan	Passing	Cade McNamara	16/24, 169 yards, 1 TD, 1 INT
Michigan	Rushing	Blake Corum	5 carries, 74 yards, 1 TD
Michigan	Receiving	Roman Wilson	2 receptions, 82 yards, 1 TD
Iowa	Passing	Spencer Petras	9/22, 137 yards
Iowa	Rushing	Gavin Williams	12 carries, 56 yards
Iowa	Receiving	Sam LaPorta	6 receptions, 62 yards

=== Vs. No. 3 Georgia—Orange Bowl (CFP Semifinal) ===
No. 2 Michigan vs. No. 3 Georgia

Team	1	2	3	4	Total
• No. 3 Bulldogs	14	13	0	7	34
No. 2 Wolverines	0	3	0	8	11

- Date: December 31
- Location: Hard Rock Stadium
  Miami Gardens, FL
- Game start: 7:40 p.m. EST
- Elapsed time: 3:19
- Game attendance: 66,839
- Game weather: 77º F, sunny, SE 7 MPH
- Referee: Scott Campbell (Big 12)
- TV announcers (ESPN): Chris Fowler, Kirk Herbstreit, Holly Rowe, and Marty Smith

Scoring summary
1	10:49	GEO	Brock Bowers 9-yard pass from Stetson Bennett (Jack Podlesny kick)	GEO 7–0
1	4:41	GEO	Adonai Mitchell 18-yard pass from Kenny McIntosh (Jack Podlesny kick)	GEO 14–0
2	12:26	GEO	Jack Podlesny 43-yard field goal	GEO 17–0
2	7:16	MICH	Jake Moody 36-yard field goal	GEO 17–3
2	3:50	GEO	Jack Podlesny 28-yard field goal	GEO 20–3
2	1:38	GEO	Jermaine Burton 57-yard pass from Stetson Bennett (Jack Podlesny kick)	GEO 27–3
4	11:11	GEO	James Cook 39-yard pass from Stetson Bennett (Jack Podlesny kick)	GEO 34–3
4	4:25	MICH	Andrel Anthony 35-yard pass from (J. J. McCarthy (A. J. Henning run)	GEO 34–11

In the final College Football Playoff rankings of the year announced on December 5, Michigan (12–1) was ranked second, earning their first playoff bid and a spot in the semifinal game to be played at the 2021 Orange Bowl against Georgia (12–1).

Michigan lost to Georgia 34–11. Georgia scored 14 points in the first quarter on a nine-yard touchdown pass from Stetson Bennett to Brock Bowers and an 18-yard touchdown pass from Kenny McIntosh to Adonai Mitchell. The teams exchanged field goals in the second quarter, first a 43-yard field goal by Jack Podlesny for Georgia, then a 36-yard field goal by Jake Moody for Michigan. Georgia added 10 points on a 28-yard field goal by Podlesny and a 57-yard touchdown pass from Bennett to Jermaine Burton, which made the score 27–3 in favor of Georgia at half-time. On the opening possession of the second half, Michigan moved the ball to the Georgia 14-yard line, however, they were unable to score following an interception in the end zone. Michigan's defense pressured Georgia into its first three-and-out of the game, however, their ensuing drive ended with a fumble, their third consecutive possession with a turnover. After a scoreless third quarter, Georgia extended their lead in the fourth quarter on a 39-yard touchdown pass from Bennett to James Cook. With 4:25 remaining in the game, Michigan scored their first touchdown of the game on a 35-yard touchdown pass from J. J. McCarthy to Andrel Anthony and a two-point conversion run from A. J. Henning.

Hassan Haskins became the first Wolverine to eclipse 1,300 yards rushing in a season since Denard Robinson in 2010 (1,702 yards). Aidan Hutchinson finished the season with the program's single-season sack record (14.0) and David Ojabo finished the season with the program's single-season forced-fumble record (five).

Statistics	UGA	MICH
First downs	21	16
Plays–yards	66–521	63–328
Rushes–yards	35–190	27–91
Passing yards	331	237
Passing: comp–att–int	21–31–0	18–36–2
Turnovers		
Time of possession	34:15	25:45

Team	Category	Player	Statistics
Georgia	Passing	Stetson Bennett	20/30, 313 yards, 3 TD
Georgia	Rushing	Zamir White	12 carries, 54 yards
Georgia	Receiving	James Cook	4 receptions, 112 yards, 1 TD
Michigan	Passing	J. J. McCarthy	7/17, 131 yards, 1 TD
Michigan	Rushing	Hassan Haskins	9 carries, 39 yards
Michigan	Receiving	Erick All	4 receptions, 63 yards

== Personnel ==
=== Roster ===
2021 Michigan Wolverines football team roster
Players
Coaches
Offense

Pos.	#	Name	Class
WR	1	Andrel Anthony	Fr
RB	2	Blake Corum	So
WR	3	A. J. Henning	So
QB	4	Dan Villari	Fr
WR	5	Mike Sainristil	Jr
WR	6	Cornelius Johnson	Jr
RB	7	Donovan Edwards	Fr
WR	8	Ronnie Bell (C)	Sr
QB	9	J. J. McCarthy	Fr
WR	10	Cristian Dixon	Fr
QB	12	Cade McNamara	So
WR	14	Roman Wilson	So
QB	15	Alan Bowman	Jr
QB	16	Davis Warren	Fr
QB	17	Peyton Smith	Fr
QB	18	Jesse Madden	Fr
RB	22	Tavierre Dunlap	Fr
RB	24	Danny Hughes	So
RB	25	Hassan Haskins	Jr
WR	26	Jake Thaw	Fr
WR	27	Christian Bartholomew	Fr
WR	30	Will Rolapp	Fr
RB	31	Lucas Andrighetto	Jr
RB	34	Leon Franklin	So
TE	35	Luke Buckman	Jr
RB	36	Nico Tiberia	Fr
TE	37	Josh Beetham	So
WR	38	Peyton O'Leary	Fr
WR	39	Matt Torey	Jr
WR	40	Jake Friedman	Fr
RB	41	Isaiah Gash	Fr
TE	45	Noah Howes	Fr
OL	51	Greg Crippen	Fr
OT	52	Karsen Barnhart	So
OT	53	Trente Jones	So
C	54	Kraig Correll	Jr
OL	55	Mica Gelb	So
OL	58	Giovanni El-Hadi	Fr
OL	60	Luke Fisher	So
OL	61	Noah Stewart	Fr
OL	62	Raheem Anderson	Fr
OL	64	Mahdi Hazime	So
OT	65	Zak Zinter	So
G	66	Chuck Filiaga	Sr
C	68	Andrew Vastardis (C)	Sr
C	70	Nolan Rumler	So
OT	71	Andrew Stueber	Sr
OT	72	Tristan Bounds	Fr
C	74	Reece Atteberry	Fr
OT	75	Peter Simmons	Fr
OT	76	Ryan Hayes	Jr
OT	77	Trevor Keegan	So
OT	78	Griffin Korican	Jr
OT	79	Jeffrey Persi	Fr
TE	80	Hunter Neff	So
TE	81	Louis Hansen	Fr
TE	82	Max Bredeson	Fr
TE	83	Erick All	Jr
TE	84	Joel Honigford	Sr
WR	84	Sam Staruch	Fr
WR	85	Daylen Baldwin	Sr
TE	86	Luke Schoonmaker	Jr
WR	88	Matthew Harrison	So
TE	88	Matthew Hibner	Fr
TE	89	Carter Selzer	Sr

Defense

Pos.	#	Name	Class
CB	1	Ja'Den McBurrows	Fr
S	2	Brad Hawkins	Sr
CB	4	Vincent Gray	Jr
CB	5	D. J. Turner	So
S	6	R. J. Moten	Fr
S	7	Makari Paige	So
LB	10	Anthony Solomon	Jr
LB	12	Josh Ross (C)	Sr
CB	13	Eamonn Dennis	Fr
S	14	Quinten Johnson	So
DT	15	Christopher Hinton	Jr
CB	16	Jalen Perry	So
DE	17	Braiden McGregor	Fr
CB	18	Keshaun Harris	So
S	19	Rod Moore	Fr
LB	20	Kalel Mullings	So
CB	22	Gemon Green	Jr
LB	23	Michael Barrett	Jr
CB	24	George Johnson	So
LB	25	Junior Colson	Fr
DT	26	Rayshaun Benny	Fr
LB	27	Tyler McLaurin	Fr
CB	28	Darion Green-Warren	Fr
LB	29	Joey Velazquez	So
S	30	Daxton Hill	Jr
S	31	Jordan Morant	Fr
DE	32	Jaylen Harrell	Fr
LB	32	Nolan Knight	So
S	33	German Green	Jr
LB	34	Jaydon Hood	Fr
S	35	Caden Kolesar	So
CB	36	Andre Seldon	So
CB	38	Joe Taylor	Fr
CB	40	Christian Boivin	Fr
LB	41	Nikhai Hill-Green	Fr
CB	42	Trevor Andrews	Fr
DE	42	TJ Guy	Fr
CB	43	Andrew Russell	Sr
CB	44	Joshua Luther	So
LB	46	Alexander Lidback	Fr
LB	50	Jerome Nichols	Fr
DE	52	Kechaun Bennett	Fr
DT	54	George Rooks	Fr
DE	55	David Ojabo	So
DT	56	Dominick Giudice	Fr
DL	57	Joey George	Jr
DT	58	Mazi Smith	So
DT	67	Jess Speight	Sr
DT	70	Jack Stewart	So
DT	72	Elijah Pierre	Sr
DE	90	Mike Morris	So
DE	91	Taylor Upshaw	Jr
DT	92	Ike Iwunnah	Fr
DT	93	Jordan Whittley	Sr
DE	94	Kris Jenkins Jr.	Fr
DT	95	Donovan Jeter	Sr
DT	96	Julius Welschof	Jr
DE	97	Aidan Hutchinson (C)	Sr
DE	99	Gabe Newburg	So

Special teams

Pos.	#	Name	Class
K	13	Jake Moody	Sr
P	19	Tommy Doman	Fr
K	29	Rhett Andersen	Sr
LS	45	Greg Tarr	Fr
LS	49	William Wagner	So
P	91	Brad Robbins	Sr
K	93	Cole Hussung	Fr

Head coach

- Jim Harbaugh

Coordinators/assistant coaches

- Biff Poggi (associate head coach)
- Mike Macdonald (defensive coordinator)
- Josh Gattis (offensive coordinator / wide receivers)
- Sherrone Moore (co-offensive coordinator / offensive line)
- Jay Harbaugh (special teams coordinator / tight ends)
- Matt Weiss (quarterbacks)
- Mike Hart (running backs)
- Shaun Nua (defensive line)
- George Helow (linebackers)
- Steve Clinkscale (defensive backs / defensive passing game coordinator)
- Ron Bellamy (safeties)
- Stephen Adegoke (graduate assistant)
- Grant Newsome (graduate assistant)

Legend

- (C) Team captain
- (S) Suspended
- (I) Ineligible
- Injured
- Redshirt

Roster
Last update: August 6, 2021

=== 2021 recruiting class ===
College recruiting
Name	Hometown	School	Height	Weight	Commit date
J. J. McCarthy; PRO-QB	La Grange Park, Illinois	IMG Academy	6 ft 3 in (1.91 m)	190 lb (86 kg)	May 11, 2019
J. J. McCarthy; PRO-QB	Recruit ratings: Rivals: 247Sports: ESPN:				
Donovan Edwards; RB	West Bloomfield, Michigan	West Bloomfield High School	5 ft 11 in (1.80 m)	190 lb (86 kg)	Dec 16, 2020
Donovan Edwards; RB	Recruit ratings: Rivals: 247Sports: ESPN:				
Giovanni El-Hadi; OT	Sterling Heights, Michigan	Adlai Stevenson High School	6 ft 5 in (1.96 m)	285 lb (129 kg)	Mar 19, 2019
Giovanni El-Hadi; OT	Recruit ratings: Rivals: 247Sports: ESPN:				
Junior Colson; OLB	Brentwood, Tennessee	Ravenwood High School	6 ft 2 in (1.88 m)	228 lb (103 kg)	May 24, 2020
Junior Colson; OLB	Recruit ratings: Rivals: 247Sports: ESPN:				
Rayshaun Benny; DT	Detroit, Michigan	Oak Park High School	6 ft 5 in (1.96 m)	275 lb (125 kg)	Feb 3, 2021
Rayshaun Benny; DT	Recruit ratings: Rivals: 247Sports: ESPN:				
Raheem Anderson; C	Detroit, Michigan	Cass Technical High School	6 ft 3 in (1.91 m)	298 lb (135 kg)	Apr 12, 2020
Raheem Anderson; C	Recruit ratings: Rivals: 247Sports: ESPN:				
Cristian Dixon; WR	Santa Ana, California	Mater Dei High School	6 ft 2 in (1.88 m)	187 lb (85 kg)	Jun 25, 2020
Cristian Dixon; WR	Recruit ratings: Rivals: 247Sports: ESPN:				
Jaydon Hood; ILB	Fort Lauderdale, Florida	St. Thomas Aquinas High School	6 ft 1 in (1.85 m)	212 lb (96 kg)	May 25, 2020
Jaydon Hood; ILB	Recruit ratings: Rivals: 247Sports: ESPN:				
George Rooks; DT	Jersey City, New Jersey	St. Peter's Preparatory School	6 ft 4 in (1.93 m)	260 lb (120 kg)	Jan 27, 2021
George Rooks; DT	Recruit ratings: Rivals: 247Sports: ESPN:				
Greg Crippen; OT	Northborough, Massachusetts	IMG Academy	6 ft 4 in (1.93 m)	285 lb (129 kg)	Mar 25, 2020
Greg Crippen; OT	Recruit ratings: Rivals: 247Sports: ESPN:				
Louis Hansen; TE	Needham, Massachusetts	St Sebastian's School	6 ft 5 in (1.96 m)	232 lb (105 kg)	Apr 2, 2020
Louis Hansen; TE	Recruit ratings: Rivals: 247Sports: ESPN:				
Kechaun Bennett; SDE	Suffield, Connecticut	Suffield Academy	6 ft 4 in (1.93 m)	220 lb (100 kg)	May 27, 2020
Kechaun Bennett; SDE	Recruit ratings: Rivals: 247Sports: ESPN:				
Tavierre Dunlap; RB	Del Valle, Texas	Del Valle High School	6 ft 0 in (1.83 m)	196 lb (89 kg)	Sep 12, 2020
Tavierre Dunlap; RB	Recruit ratings: Rivals: 247Sports: ESPN:				
Tristan Bounds; OT	Wallingford, Connecticut	Choate Rosemary Hall	6 ft 8 in (2.03 m)	285 lb (129 kg)	Jun 1, 2020
Tristan Bounds; OT	Recruit ratings: Rivals: 247Sports: ESPN:				
Tyler McLaurin; OLB	Bolingbrook, Illinois	Bolingbrook High School	6 ft 2 in (1.88 m)	210 lb (95 kg)	May 9, 2020
Tyler McLaurin; OLB	Recruit ratings: Rivals: 247Sports: ESPN:				
Rod Moore; S	Clayton, Ohio	Northmont High School	5 ft 11 in (1.80 m)	180 lb (82 kg)	May 10, 2020
Rod Moore; S	Recruit ratings: Rivals: 247Sports: ESPN:				
Andrel Anthony; WR	East Lansing, Michigan	East Lansing High School	6 ft 2 in (1.88 m)	175 lb (79 kg)	Jul 31, 2020
Andrel Anthony; WR	Recruit ratings: Rivals: 247Sports: ESPN:				
Ja'Den McBurrows; CB	Fort Lauderdale, Florida	St. Thomas Aquinas High School	5 ft 10 in (1.78 m)	165 lb (75 kg)	Apr 24, 2020
Ja'Den McBurrows; CB	Recruit ratings: Rivals: 247Sports: ESPN:				
TJ Guy; WDE	Mansfield, Massachusetts	Mansfield High School	6 ft 4 in (1.93 m)	240 lb (110 kg)	Apr 17, 2020
TJ Guy; WDE	Recruit ratings: Rivals: 247Sports: ESPN:				
Ikechukwu Iwunnah; DT	Garland, Texas	Lakeview Centennial High School	6 ft 4 in (1.93 m)	275 lb (125 kg)	Feb 3, 2021
Ikechukwu Iwunnah; DT	Recruit ratings: Rivals: 247Sports: ESPN:				
Tommy Doman; P	Rochester Hills, Michigan	St. Mary's Preparatory	6 ft 3 in (1.91 m)	170 lb (77 kg)	Apr 2, 2020
Tommy Doman; P	Recruit ratings: Rivals: 247Sports: ESPN:				
Dominick Giudice; WDE	Freehold, New Jersey	Mater Dei High School	6 ft 4 in (1.93 m)	250 lb (110 kg)	Mar 25, 2020
Dominick Giudice; WDE	Recruit ratings: Rivals: 247Sports: ESPN:				
Overall recruit ranking: Rivals: 9 247Sports: 10 ESPN: 14
Note: In many cases, Scout, Rivals, 247Sports, On3, and ESPN may conflict in their listings of height and weight.; In these cases, the average was taken. ESPN grades are on a 100-point scale.; Sources: "2021 Michigan football commitments". Rivals.; "2021 Team Ranking". Rivals.com.; "2021 Michigan football commitments". 247Sports.

=== Incoming transfers ===
Michigan incoming transfers
Name	Number	Pos.	Height	Weight	Year	Hometown	Previous team
Daylen Baldwin	85	WR	6'2"	219	GS	Southfield, Michigan	Jackson State
Alan Bowman	15	QB	6'4"	205	GS	Grapevine, Texas	Texas Tech
Jordan Whittley	93	DT	6'1"	348	GS	Richmond, California	Oregon State

== Awards and honors ==
All-American
Player	AP	AFCA	FWAA	TSN	WCFF	ESPN	CBS	Athletic	USAT	Designation
Aidan Hutchinson	1	1	1	1	1	1	1	1	1	Unanimous
Jake Moody	1	1		2	1		1		2	Consensus
David Ojabo	2						2			
Hassan Haskins	3	2								
Andrew Stueber		2								
The NCAA recognizes a selection to all five of the AP, AFCA, FWAA, TSN and WCFF first teams for unanimous selections and three of five for consensus selections.

Weekly awards
Player	Award	Date awarded	Ref.
Blake Corum	Big Ten Offensive Player of the Week	September 13, 2021	
David Ojabo	Big Ten Co-defensive Player of the Week	October 4, 2021	
Brad Hawkins	Big Ten Co-defensive Player of the Week	October 11, 2021	
Jake Moody	Big Ten Special Teams Player of the Week	October 11, 2021	
Andrel Anthony	Big Ten Co-Freshman of the Week	November 1, 2021	
Aidan Hutchinson	Big Ten Defensive Player of the Week	November 15, 2021	
Aidan Hutchinson	Big Ten Defensive Player of the Week	November 29, 2021	
Hassan Haskins	Big Ten Offensive Player of the Week	November 29, 2021	

Individual awards
Player	Award	Ref.
Aidan Hutchinson	Nagurski–Woodson Defensive Player of the Year; Smith–Brown Defensive Lineman of the Year; Big Ten Championship Game MVP; Lombardi Award; Ted Hendricks Award; Chicago Tribune Silver Football; Lott IMPACT Trophy; Co-Mayo Clinic Comeback Player of the Year	
Jake Moody	Bakken–Andersen Kicker of the Year; Lou Groza Award	
Josh Gattis	Broyles Award	
Jim Harbaugh	AP Coach of the Year Award	

Team awards
Unit	Award	Ref.
Offensive line	Joe Moore Award	

All-Big Ten
Player	Position	Coaches	Media
Hassan Haskins	RB	1	1
Aidan Hutchinson	DL	1	1
David Ojabo	LB	1	1
Daxton Hill	DB	1	2
Jake Moody	K	1	3
Andrew Stueber	OL	3	1
Ryan Hayes	OL	2	Hon.
Zak Zinter	OL	Hon.	2
Andrew Vastardis	OL	Hon.	2
A. J. Henning	KR	3	3
Cade McNamara	QB	3	3
Blake Corum	RB	3	Hon.
Josh Ross	LB	Hon.	3
Vincent Gray	DB	–	3
Brad Hawkins	DB	–	3
Erick All	TE	Hon.	Hon.
Christopher Hinton	DL	Hon.	Hon.
Trevor Keegan	OL	Hon.	Hon.
Brad Robbins	P	Hon.	Hon.
Luke Schoonmaker	TE	Hon.	Hon.
Mazi Smith	DL	Hon.	Hon.
D. J. Turner	DB	Hon.	Hon.
Hon. = Honorable mention. Reference:

== Statistics ==
=== Offensive statistics ===
Rushing
Player	GP	Att	Net Yards	Yds/Att	TD	Long
Hassan Haskins	14	270	1,327	4.9	20	62
Blake Corum	12	143	952	6.7	11	67
Donovan Edwards	12	35	174	5.0	3	58
A. J. Henning	14	9	162	18.0	2	74
J. J. McCarthy	11	26	117	4.5	2	23

Passing
Player	GP	Att	Comp	Comp %	Yds	TD	Int	Long
Cade McNamara	14	327	210	64.2%	2,576	15	6	93
J. J. McCarthy	11	59	34	57.6%	516	5	2	69
Donovan Edwards	12	1	1	100.0%	75	1	0	75
Dan Villari	4	3	1	33.3%	26	0	0	26
Alan Bowman	3	4	2	50.0%	9	0	1	6

Receiving
Player	GP	Recp	Yds	Yds/Recp	Yds/GP	TD	Long
Cornelius Johnson	14	38	613	16.1	43.8	3	87
Erick All	13	38	437	11.5	33.6	2	47
Roman Wilson	13	25	420	16.8	32.3	3	75
Mike Sainristil	14	22	312	14.2	22.3	2	51
Donovan Edwards	12	20	265	13.3	22.1	1	77
Daylen Baldwin	14	17	256	15.1	18.3	2	69
Andrel Anthony	12	12	248	20.7	20.7	3	93
Luke Schoonmaker	14	17	165	9.7	11.8	3	27
Blake Corum	12	24	141	5.9	11.8	1	14
Hassan Haskins	14	18	131	7.3	9.4	0	20
A. J. Henning	14	10	79	7.9	5.6	0	24
Ronnie Bell	1	1	76	76.0	76.0	1	76

=== Defensive statistics ===
Player	GP	Solo	Asst	Tot	TFL	Sack	Int	PBU	QBH
Josh Ross	14	54	53	107.0	9.0	0.5	0	2	8
Daxton Hill	14	42	28	70.0	4.5	0.5	2	9	4
Aidan Hutchinson	14	36	26	62.0	16.5	14.0	0	3	12
Junior Colson	14	28	33	61.0	0.5	0.5	0	2	3
Brad Hawkins	14	41	19	60.0	3.0	0	0	4	1
Nikhai Hill-Green	14	35	15	50.0	2.0	0	0	1	0
Vincent Gray	14	33	12	45.0	2.5	1.0	0	8	1
Mazi Smith	14	15	22	37.0	2.5	0	0	4	4
David Ojabo	14	24	11	35.0	12.0	11.0	0	3	8
R. J. Moten	14	27	7	34.0	0	0	1	3	1
D. J. Turner	14	26	7	33.0	1.0	0	2	7	0
Christopher Hinton	14	18	15	33.0	1.5	1.0	0	2	1
Rod Moore	11	21	11	32.0	0	0	0	1	0
Gemon Green	12	14	10	24.0	0.5	0	1	1	0
Donovan Jeter	14	12	12	24.0	2.0	0	0	2	0

=== Special teams statistics ===
Kickoff returns
Player	Returns	Yds	Yds/Rtrn	TD	Long
Blake Corum	12	304	25.3	0	79
A. J. Henning	7	177	25.3	1	79

Punt returns
Player	Returns	Yds	Yds/Rtrn	TD	Long
A. J. Henning	29	274	9.4	0	32
Caden Kolesar	3	33	11.0	0	20
Ronnie Bell	1	31	31.0	0	31
D. J. Turner	1	25	25.0	0	25

Punts
Player	Punts	Yds	Yds/Punt	Long	50+	Inside 20	T'back
Brad Robbins	45	2085	46.3	65	12	17	3

Field goals
Player	FGs	Att	Long	Blocked
Jake Moody	23	25	52	0

== 2022 NFL draft ==
Michigan had five players selected in the 2022 NFL draft.

Round	Pick	Player	Position	NFL team
1	2	Aidan Hutchinson	DE	Detroit Lions
1	31	Daxton Hill	S	Cincinnati Bengals
2	45	David Ojabo	DE	Baltimore Ravens
4	131	Hassan Haskins	RB	Tennessee Titans
7	245	Andrew Stueber	G	New England Patriots
