= Josh Ross (American football) =

American football player (born 1999)

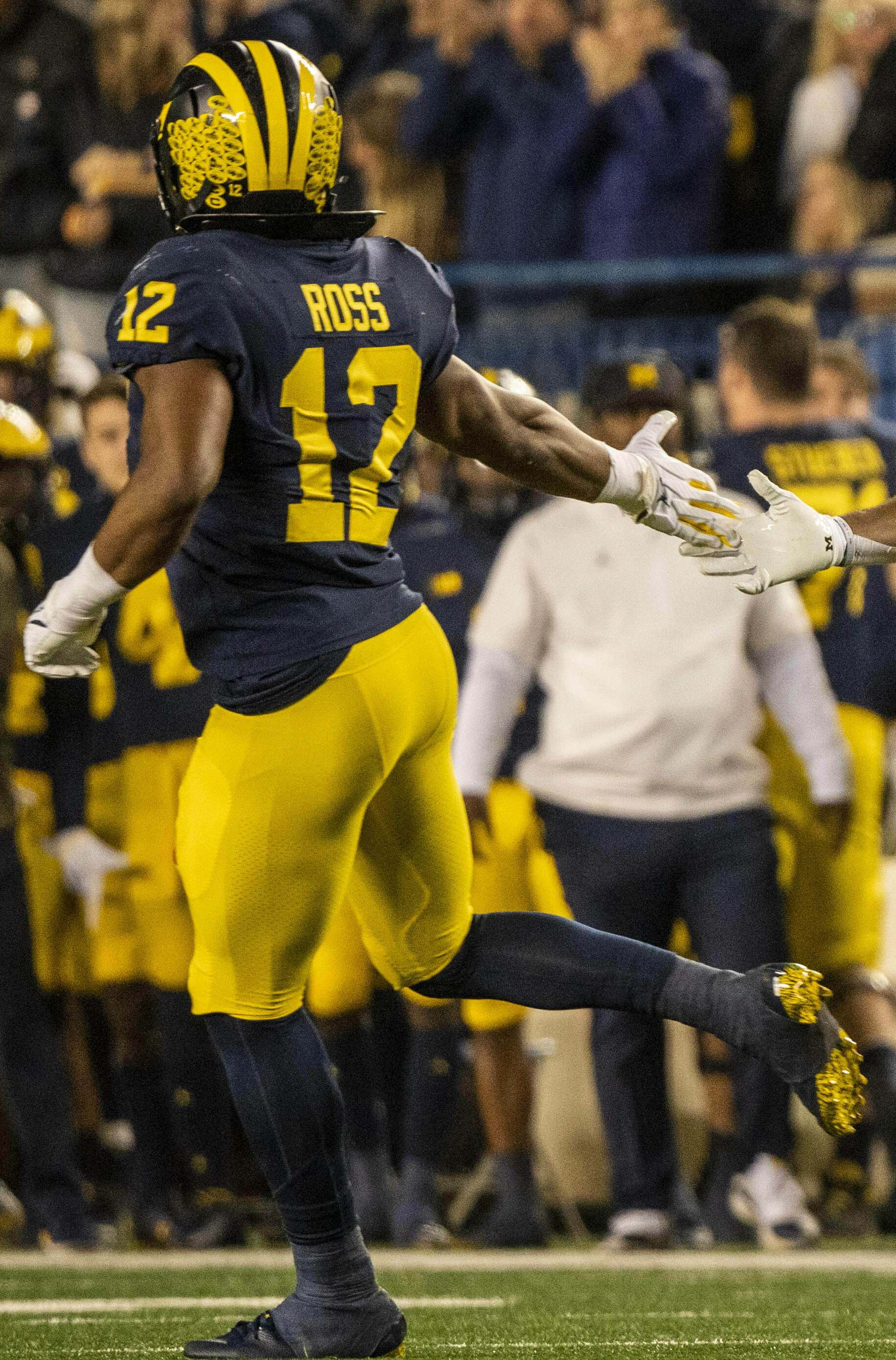
- Ross with the Michigan Wolverines in 2021

No. 56 – Minnesota Vikings
- Position: Linebacker
- Roster status: Practice squad

Personal information
- Born: October 31, 1999 (age 27); Detroit, Michigan, U.S.
- Listed height: 6 ft 0 in (1.83 m)
- Listed weight: 229 lb (104 kg)

Career information
- High school: St. Mary's Preparatory (Orchard Lake, Michigan)
- College: Michigan (2017–2021)
- NFL draft: 2022: undrafted

Career history
- Baltimore Ravens (2022–2024); Seattle Seahawks (2024); Minnesota Vikings (2025)*; Seattle Seahawks (2026)*; Minnesota Vikings (2026–present)*
- * Offseason or practice squad member only

Awards and highlights
- Third-team All-Big Ten (2021)

Career NFL statistics as of 2025
- Total tackles: 11
- Stats at Pro Football Reference

Josh Ross (born October 31, 1999) is an American professional football linebacker for the Minnesota Vikings of the National Football League (NFL). He played college football for the Michigan Wolverines. Ross has previously been a member of the Baltimore Ravens.

== Early life ==
Ross grew up in Southfield, Michigan and attended St. Mary's Preparatory school. As a senior, he made 142 tackles with 20 tackles for loss, 12.5 sacks, three forced fumbles, and three fumble recoveries. Ross was rated a four-star recruit and committed to play college football at Michigan over offers from Ohio State, Michigan State and Notre Dame.

== College career ==
Ross was a member of the Michigan Wolverines for five seasons. He played in all 13 of Michigan's games, primarily on special teams, during his freshman season. As a sophomore, Ross again played in all of the team's games and was named honorable mention All-Big Ten Conference after finishing the season with 61 tackles and one sack. He started the first three games of his junior season before suffering an ankle injury that caused him to miss the remainder of the regular season. As a senior, Ross started all six of Michigan's games during the Big Ten's COVID-19-shortened 2020 season and was again named honorable mention all-conference after making 53 tackles. Ross opted to return to Michigan for a fifth season as a graduate student. In his final season, Ross had 106 tackles with nine tackles for loss and was named third-team All-Big Ten.

== Professional career ==
Pre-draft measurables
Height	Weight	Arm length	Hand span	Wingspan	40-yard dash	10-yard split	20-yard split	20-yard shuttle	Three-cone drill	Vertical jump	Broad jump	Bench press
6 ft 0 3/8 in (1.84 m)	227 lb (103 kg)	30 1/2 in (0.77 m)	9 3/4 in (0.25 m)	6 ft 2 1/4 in (1.89 m)	4.79 s	1.59 s	2.76 s	4.60 s	7.65 s	33.5 in (0.85 m)	9 ft 1 in (2.77 m)	17 reps
All values from NFL Combine/Pro Day

=== Baltimore Ravens ===
Ross signed with the Baltimore Ravens as an undrafted free agent on May 7, 2022. He made the Ravens' initial 53-man roster out of training camp. He suffered a foot injury in Week 2 and was placed on injured reserve on September 19, 2022. He was designated to return from injured reserve on December 20, 2022.

On August 29, 2023, Ross was waived by the Ravens and re-signed to the practice squad. He signed a reserve/future contract on January 29, 2024.

Ross was waived on August 27, 2024, and re-signed to the practice squad. He was promoted to the active roster on September 5. He was waived on October 22.

=== Seattle Seahawks (first stint) ===
Ross was claimed off waivers by the Seattle Seahawks on October 23, 2024

On March 21, 2025, Ross was re-signed by the Seahawks to a one-year deal. He was waived on August 26 as part of final roster cuts.

=== Minnesota Vikings ===
On December 10, 2025, Ross signed with the Minnesota Vikings' practice squad. He signed a reserve/future contract with Minnesota on January 5, 2026. On August 30, Ross was waived by the Vikings as a part of final roster cuts.

=== Seattle Seahawks (second stint) ===
On October 21, 2026, Ross signed with the Seattle Seahawks practice squad. On October 27, he was released.

=== Minnesota Vikings (second stint) ===
On November 11, 2026, Ross was signed to the Minnesota Vikings practice squad.
