= Greater Atlanta Christian School =

Private Christian school in Norcross, Georgia, United States

Location
- 1575 Indian Trail Road; Norcross, Georgia 30093; United States
- 33°55′10″N 84°10′14″W

Information
- Type: Private school
- Motto: "Quality Education in a Christian Environment"
- Established: 1968
- President: Scott Harsh
- High school principal: Paul Cable
- Teaching staff: 117.5 (on an FTE basis)
- Grades: PreK–12
- Enrollment: 1,691 (2023–24)
- Student to teacher ratio: 12.4
- Colors: Scarlet, gold, and black
- Nickname: Spartans
- Accreditation: Cognia
- Yearbook: The Olympian
- Website: www.greateratlantachristian.org

Greater Atlanta Christian School is a private Christian school located in Norcross, Georgia, United States.

== Notable alumni ==
- Micah Abernathy, NFL free safety for the Atlanta Falcons
- Sherill Baker, former WNBA player, assistant coach for Georgia State Panthers women's basketball
- Cindy Brogdon, 1976 Olympic women's basketball team, first female in Georgia to receive an athletic scholarship
- Malcolm Brogdon, NBA player for the Washington Wizards, NBA Rookie of the year 2017, NBA Sixth Man of the Year 2023
- D. J. Coker, professional football player
- Chuck Efstration, Georgia State Representative
- T-Bob Hebert, sports radio personality
- Christopher Hinton Jr., NFL nose tackle for the Los Angeles Chargers
- Myles Hinton, college football offensive tackle for the Michigan Wolverines
- Julian Horton, American Actor
- Jasmine Jones, track and field athlete
- Caleb King, former NFL running back
- Andrew Knowlton, journalist
- Danielle Marcano (born 1997), professional soccer forward, who plays in the Turkish Women's Football Super League for Fomget Gençlik ve Spor and represents Puerto Rico internationally
- Heather McMahan, comedian and actress
- Davis Mills, NFL quarterback for the Houston Texans
- Kalif Raymond, NFL wide receiver for the Detroit Lions
- Ben Sheppard, professional basketball player for the Indiana Pacers
- Darius Slayton, NFL wide receiver for the New York Giants
- Drew Steckenrider, MLB pitcher for the Oakland Athletics
- Kayla Tausche, broadcast journalist for CNN
- Isaiah Wilkins, former Basketball Bundesliga player for the Ratiopharm Ulm
