= Chris Hinton =

American football player (born 1961)

No. 75, 71, 78
- Position: Tackle

Personal information
- Born: July 31, 1961 (age 65); Chicago, Illinois, U.S.
- Listed height: 6 ft 4 in (1.93 m)
- Listed weight: 300 lb (136 kg)

Career information
- High school: Wendell Phillips Academy (Chicago)
- College: Northwestern (1979–1982)
- NFL draft: 1983: 1st round, 4th overall pick

Career history
- Baltimore / Indianapolis Colts (1983–1989); Atlanta Falcons (1990–1993); Minnesota Vikings (1994–1995)

Awards and highlights
- First-team All-Pro (1993); 2× Second-team All-Pro (1985, 1989); 7× Pro Bowl (1983, 1985–1989, 1991); PFWA All-Rookie Team (1983); Indianapolis Colts Ring of Honor; First-team All-American (1982); First-team All-Big Ten (1982)

Career NFL statistics
- Games played: 177
- Games started: 172
- Fumble recoveries: 7
- Stats at Pro Football Reference

Christopher Jerrod Hinton (born July 31, 1961) is an American former professional football tackle who played in the National Football League (NFL) for 13 seasons, primarily with the Indianapolis Colts franchise. In addition to his seven seasons with the Colts, he was a member of the Atlanta Falcons for four seasons and the Minnesota Vikings for two seasons.

Hinton played college football for the Northwestern Wildcats, earning first-team All-American honors in 1982. He was selected fourth overall in the 1983 NFL draft by the Denver Broncos, who traded him to the Colts during the draft. During his professional career, Hinton received seven Pro Bowl selections and one first-team All-Pro selection. He was inducted to the Indianapolis Colts Ring of Honor in 2001.

== College career ==
A graduate of Chicago's Phillips High School, Hinton began attending Northwestern University in 1979 and was originally a tight end. As a true freshman he played in 11 games and caught seven passes for 43-yards. In his last season as a tight end in 1980 he caught 19 passes for 265 receiving yards in ten games. As a junior in 1981, Hinton was switched to offensive tackle by second year head coach Dennis Green. His best collegiate season came in his senior year in 1982, as he was voted co-captain to begin the season and was voted first-team All-America and first-team All Big 10. He completed the year playing in the East–West Shrine Game and the Blue-Gray Classic.

== Professional career ==
=== 1983 NFL draft ===
Going into the 1983 NFL draft, Hinton was regarded as the top offensive guard and a top ten overall prospect by the majority of scouts and analysts.

The Denver Broncos selected Hinton with the fourth overall pick in the 1983 NFL Draft, making him the first guard and first one taken. The team traded him to the Baltimore Colts, along with quarterback Mark Herrmann and the Broncos' first round pick in the 1984 NFL draft, for the first overall pick in the 1983 NFL Draft, quarterback John Elway. Hinton later said that he had "a good career, but I will always be known as the guy traded for John Elway." He went to seven Pro Bowls, six with the Colts and one with the Atlanta Falcons. (Hinton also said "I used to always be kidded by the guys on the Colts, 'We could've had Elway instead of you.' And I'd say, 'Yeah, but you wouldn't have had anybody to block for him.'")

=== Baltimore/Indianapolis Colts ===
Going into his rookie season in 1983, Hinton was named the Baltimore Colts' starting left guard and appeared in all 16 regular season games, starting 15 of them. The Colts went on to move to Indianapolis in 1984 and Hinton started six games for them at left tackle. He returned to the starting left tackle position in 1985 and started all 16 regular season games. In 1986, under the Indianapolis Colts' new head coach Ron Meyer, he finished all 16 regular-season games at left tackle and started another 12 games at left tackle in 1987. Hinton played in 14 games at left tackle in 1988 and started 13 of them, helping the Indianapolis Colts achieve a 9–7 record. Hinton played his last season for the Indianapolis Colts in 1989, starting 14 games at left tackle, as they finished with an 8–8 record. He finished his career with the Indianapolis Colts, playing in a total of 94 games, starting 92, and being voted to six Pro Bowls.

=== Atlanta Falcons ===
On April 20, 1990, the Indianapolis Colts traded him to the Atlanta Falcons in exchange for the Falcons' first overall pick in the 1990 NFL draft, which they used to select top quarterback prospect Jeff George. The Falcons also received wide receiver Andre Rison, who was the Indianapolis Colts' first round pick in the 1989 NFL draft, their fifth round pick in the 1990 NFL Draft, and their first round pick in the 1991 NFL Draft.

In his first season with the Falcons, he was named their starting right tackle and played in 15 games, starting 12. He wore #71 in his first season with the Falcons but was able to switch to #75 in 1991, which he wore for the first seven years of his NFL career. In 1991, he played all 16 regular season games at right tackle and was named to the Pro Bowl. He returned as the starting right tackle the following season and started another entire season. To begin the 1993 NFL season, the Falcons named Hinton their starting right guard. He started all 16 regular season games and helped the Falcons' 6–10 record in his last season with them.

=== Minnesota Vikings ===
He signed as a free agent with the Minnesota Vikings in 1994 and was reunited with his former college head coach Dennis Green. He wore #78 and was named their starting right tackle to begin the season. He helped them finish first in the NFC Central with a 10–6 record and started all 16 regular season games. The following year, Hinton was limited to only four games and four starts at offensive tackle. He finished his career with the Minnesota Vikings with 20 games and 20 starts.

== Personal life ==
Hinton currently owns and operates a wine store with two locations, one in Johns Creek, Georgia and the other in Sandy Springs, Georgia. He is the father of Christopher Hinton and Myles Hinton, both played for the Michigan Wolverines.

== Legacy ==
Hinton was the first offensive tackle to appear in the Pro Bowl as a rookie along with the first one to be a Pro Bowler at three different positions (left guard, left tackle and right guard); Hinton believed himself to have played outside of his preferred position of guard, which he played for just three of his 13 seasons. He also was among the first players honored with selection to the Indianapolis Colts Ring of Honor. He played for just four winning teams in 13 seasons. In his years for consideration among Hall of Fame voters, he was only a semifinalist once in 2017. Hinton was named to the Professional Football Researchers Association Hall of Very Good class of 2025, which described him as "arguably the most versatile and talented offensive lineman in NFL history".
