= Myles Hinton =

American football player (born 2002)

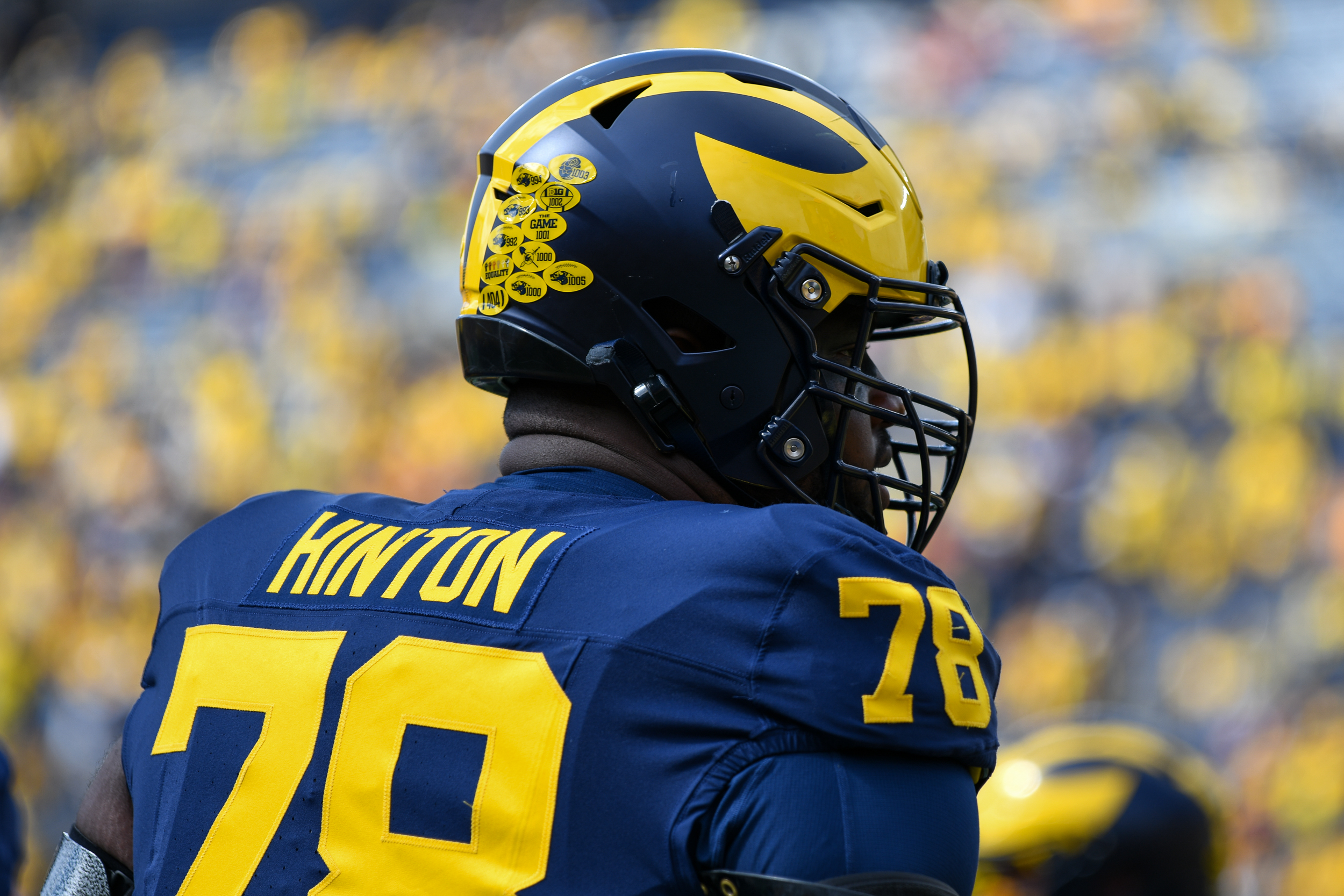
- Hinton with the Michigan Wolverines in 2024

No. 77 – Cincinnati Bengals
- Position: Offensive tackle
- Roster status: Active

Personal information
- Born: January 9, 2002 (age 24); Johns Creek, Georgia, U.S.
- Listed height: 6 ft 6 in (1.98 m)
- Listed weight: 323 lb (147 kg)

Career information
- High school: Greater Atlanta Christian (Norcross, Georgia)
- College: Stanford (2020–2022); Michigan (2023–2024)
- NFL draft: 2025: 6th round, 191st overall pick

Career history
- Philadelphia Eagles (2025); Cincinnati Bengals (2026–present)

Awards and highlights
- CFP national champion (2023)
- Stats at Pro Football Reference

Myles Hinton (born January 9, 2002) is an American professional football offensive tackle for the Cincinnati Bengals of the National Football League (NFL). He played college football for the Stanford Cardinal and Michigan Wolverines, winning a national championship with Michigan in 2023. Hinton was selected by the Eagles in the sixth round of the 2025 NFL draft.

== Early life ==
Hinton was born on January 9, 2002, the son of Mya and Chris Hinton, and the younger brother of Christopher Hinton Jr. Both his father and brother played in the NFL. He grew up in Johns Creek, Georgia and attended Greater Atlanta Christian School. Hinton was rated as a five-star recruit, the second best offensive tackle and the 12th overall prospect in the class of 2020. Hinton committed to play college football for the Stanford Cardinal over offers from Alabama, Georgia, Miami, Michigan, Ohio State and Oklahoma.

== College career ==
=== Stanford ===
As a freshman in 2020, Hinton appeared in four games and was named Stanford's most outstanding freshman. In 2021, he appeared in 11 games, starting nine times for the Cardinal. In 2022, Hinton started all seven games he appeared in. After the season, he entered the NCAA transfer portal.

=== Michigan ===
On December 17, 2022, Hinton transferred to the University of Michigan for his final two seasons. He opened the 2023 season as the starting left tackle for the Wolverines. Hinton started five games before losing his starting role, in total appearing in 13 games as Michigan won a national championship in 2023.

In 2024, Hinton started 10 games for the Michigan Wolverines at left tackle and was an All-Big Ten honorable mention. In December 2024, he formally declared for the 2025 NFL draft and opted out of his final bowl game.

== Professional career ==
Pre-draft measurables
Height	Weight	Arm length	Hand span	Wingspan	20-yard shuttle	Vertical jump	Bench press
6 ft 6 3/4 in (2.00 m)	323 lb (147 kg)	34 1/8 in (0.87 m)	10 1/4 in (0.26 m)	6 ft 10 3/4 in (2.10 m)	4.94 s	31.5 in (0.80 m)	19 reps
All values from NFL Combine/Pro Day

=== Philadelphia Eagles ===
Hinton was selected by the Philadelphia Eagles with the 191st overall pick in the sixth round of the 2025 NFL draft. On August 28, 2025, Hinton was placed on injured reserve due to a back injury.

On August 30, 2026, Hinton was waived by the Eagles as a part of final roster cuts.

=== Cincinnati Bengals ===
On August 31, 2026, Hinton was claimed off of waivers by the Cincinnati Bengals.
