= Andrew Stueber =

American football player (born 1999)

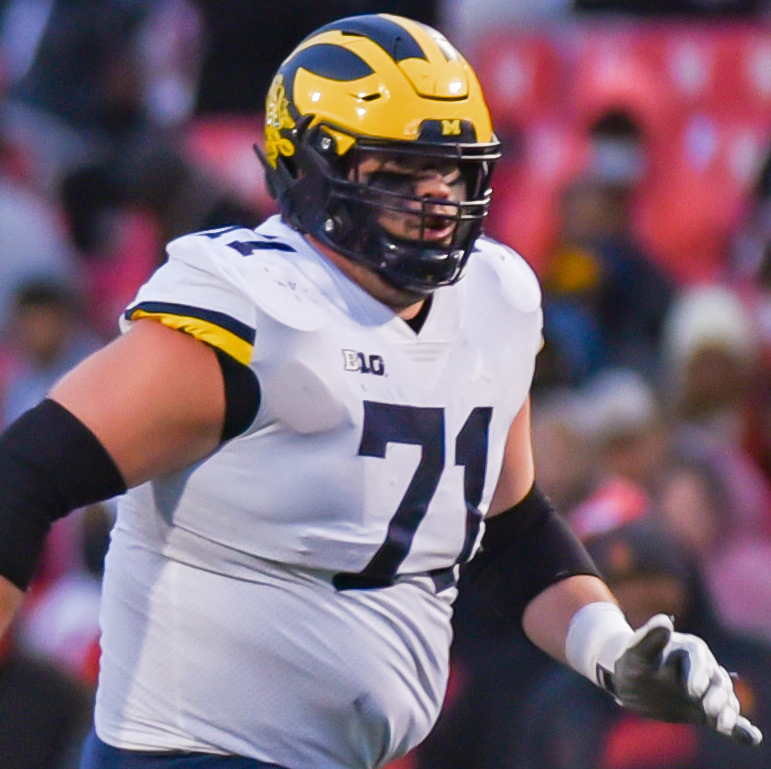
- Stueber with the Michigan Wolverines in 2021

Profile
- Position: Offensive tackle

Personal information
- Born: July 1, 1999 (age 27); Darien, Connecticut, U.S.
- Listed height: 6 ft 7 in (2.01 m)
- Listed weight: 320 lb (145 kg)

Career information
- High school: Darien
- College: Michigan (2017–2021)
- NFL draft: 2022: 7th round, 245th overall pick

Career history
- New England Patriots (2022–2023); Atlanta Falcons (2024)*; Cincinnati Bengals (2024); Atlanta Falcons (2025)
- * Offseason or practice squad member only

Awards and highlights
- Second-team All-American (2021); First-team All-Big Ten (2021)
- Stats at Pro Football Reference

Andrew Stueber (born July 1, 1999) is an American professional American football offensive tackle. He played college football for the Michigan Wolverines, receiving second-team All-American recognition by the AFCA in 2021. Stueber was selected by the New England Patriots in the seventh round of the 2022 NFL draft.

== College career ==
On June 25, 2016, Stueber announced his commitment to Michigan, as part of the highest-rated Michigan recruiting class in the modern era. He was ranked a four-star prospect by ESPN and the No. 4 player in the state of Connecticut.

As a junior in 2019, he suffered a torn ACL in training camp and missed the entire season. As a senior in 2020, he was recognized by the Walter Camp Football Foundation as the 2020 Connecticut Player of the Year.

As a graduate student in 2021, he helped lead the offensive line with the fewest sacks allowed (10) and third-fewest tackles for loss (27) nationally and is a semifinalist for the Joe Moore Award. Following the season he was named first-team All-Big Ten Conference by the media and was named a second-team All-American by AFCA.

== Professional career ==
Pre-draft measurables
Height	Weight	Arm length	Hand span	Wingspan	20-yard shuttle	Three-cone drill	Vertical jump	Broad jump	Bench press
6 ft 6 5/8 in (2.00 m)	325 lb (147 kg)	34 1/8 in (0.87 m)	10 in (0.25 m)	6 ft 7 7/8 in (2.03 m)	4.90 s	7.94 s	24.5 in (0.62 m)	8 ft 5 in (2.57 m)	18 reps
All values from NFL Combine/Pro Day

=== New England Patriots ===
Stueber was selected by the New England Patriots in the seventh round (245th overall) of the 2022 NFL draft. He was placed on the reserve/non-football injury list with a torn hamstring on August 23, 2022, and missed the 2022 NFL season.

On August 29, 2023, Stueber was waived by the Patriots and re-signed to the practice squad. He signed a reserve/future contract on January 8, 2024. On June 3, 2024, he was released by the Patriots.

=== Atlanta Falcons (first stint) ===
On June 4, 2024, Stueber was claimed off waivers by the Atlanta Falcons. He was waived on August 27, and was re-signed to the practice squad.

=== Cincinnati Bengals ===
On October 7, 2024, Steuber was signed by the Cincinnati Bengals to their active roster off the Falcons' practice squad. He was waived on November 28, and re-signed to the practice squad. He was promoted to the active roster on December 4.

On August 25, 2025, Stueber was waived by the Bengals.

=== Atlanta Falcons (second stint) ===
On November 4, 2025, Stueber signed with the Atlanta Falcons' active roster. He was waived on November 15 and re-signed to the practice squad three days later. Stueber signed a reserve/future contract with Atlanta on January 5, 2026. On August 29, Stueber was waived by the Falcons.
