= Andrel Anthony =

American football player (born 2002)

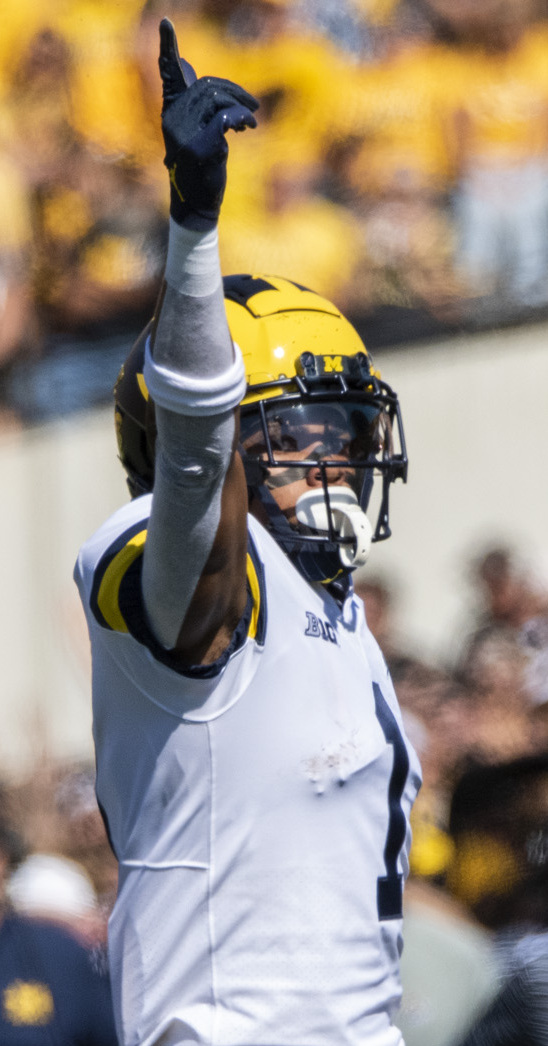
- Anthony with Michigan in 2022

Profile
- Position: Wide receiver

Personal information
- Born: January 7, 2002 (age 24)
- Listed height: 6 ft 1 in (1.85 m)
- Listed weight: 186 lb (84 kg)

Career information
- High school: East Lansing (MI)
- College: Michigan (2021–2022); Oklahoma (2023–2024); Duke (2025)

Career history
- Atlanta Falcons (2026)*
- * Offseason or practice squad member only
- Stats at ESPN

Andrel Anthony (born January 7, 2002) is an American professional football wide receiver. He played college football for Michigan, Oklahoma and Duke.

== Early life ==
Anthony played high school football in East Lansing, Michigan. He set the East Lansing High School records for most receiving yards in a season (954 in 2019) and a career (1,971).

== College career ==
=== Michigan ===
Anthony received scholarship offers from Notre Dame, Penn State, Arkansas, Ole Miss, Wisconsin, Michigan State, and Kentucky. He announced his commitment to the University of Michigan at the end of July 2020. He opted not to play his senior year at East Lansing and to instead enroll early at Michigan.

Against Michigan State on October 30, 2021, he made his first reception at Michigan, a 93-yard touchdown from Cade McNamara, the second longest pass play in Michigan football history. He ended the game with six catches for 155 yards and two touchdowns. He was subsequently named the Big Ten Co-Freshman of the Week for the week ending November 1, 2021.

As a sophomore in 2022, Anthony caught seven passes for 80 yards and a touchdown.

=== Oklahoma ===
On January 10, 2023, Anthony transferred to Oklahoma.

On December 11, 2024, Anthony announced that he would enter the transfer portal for the second time.

=== Duke ===
On December 19, 2024, Anthony announced that he would transfer to Duke.

== Professional career ==
Pre-draft measurables
| Height | Weight | Arm length | Hand span | Wingspan | 40-yard dash | 10-yard split | 20-yard split | Vertical jump |
|---|---|---|---|---|---|---|---|---|
| 6 ft 0 1/2 in (1.84 m) | 187 lb (85 kg) | 32 1/4 in (0.82 m) | 9 in (0.23 m) | 6 ft 5 5/8 in (1.97 m) | 4.59 s | 1.56 s | 2.68 s | 29 in (0.74 m) |
All values from Pro Day

On April 25, 2026, Anthony signed to join the Atlanta Falcons as an undrafted free agent, but was on included on the official free agent list.
