= Daylen Baldwin =

American football player (born 1997)

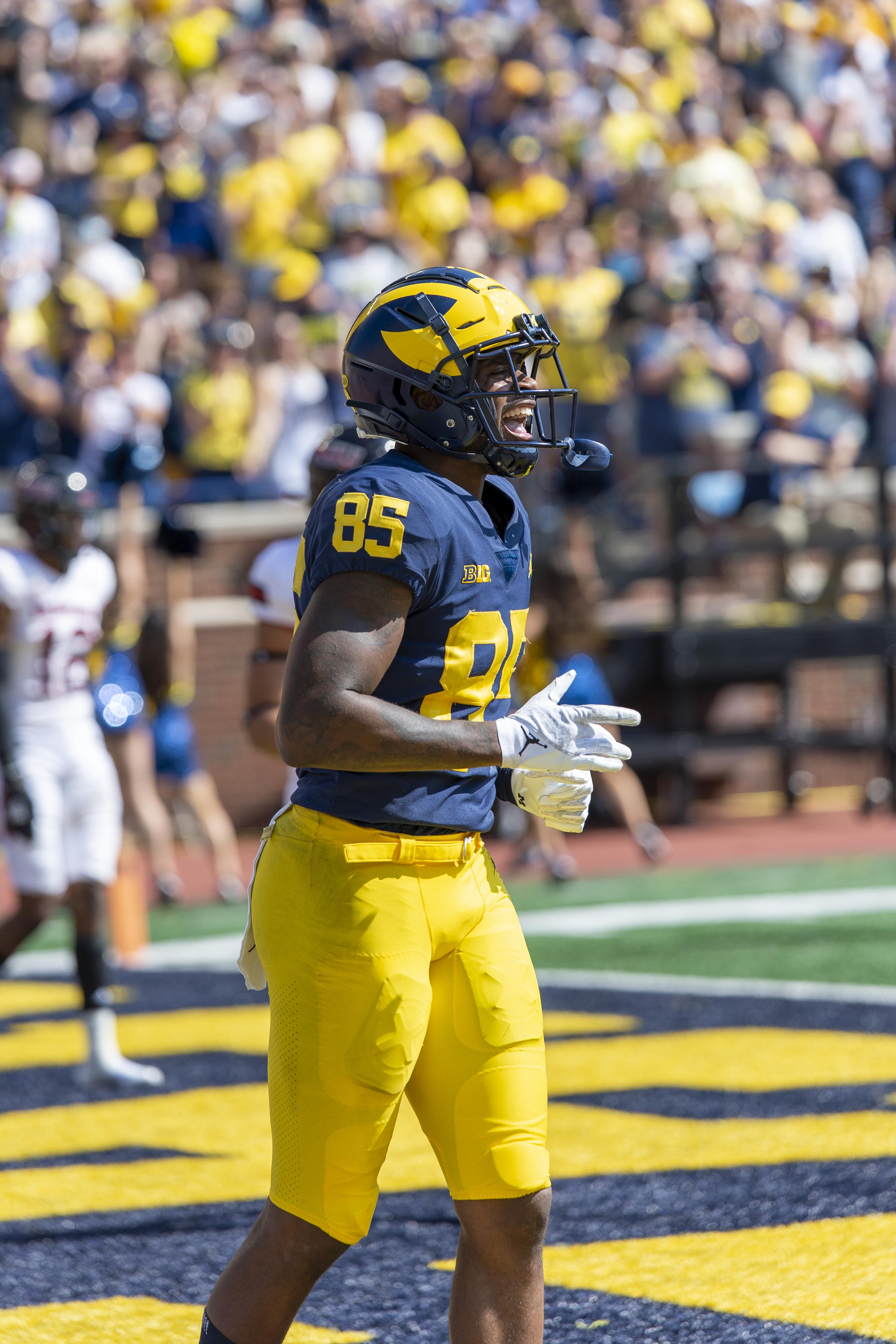
- Baldwin with the Michigan Wolverines in 2021

Profile
- Position: Wide receiver

Personal information
- Born: November 24, 1999 (age 26); Southfield, Michigan, U.S.
- Listed height: 6 ft 2 in (1.88 m)
- Listed weight: 219 lb (99 kg)

Career information
- High school: Farmington (MI); Waterford Mott (MI)
- College: Morgan State (2017–2018); Jackson State (2019–2020); Michigan (2021)
- NFL draft: 2022: undrafted

Career history
- Cleveland Browns (2022–2023); Minnesota Vikings (2023)*; Atlanta Falcons (2024)*; Arizona Cardinals (2024)*; Calgary Stampeders (2025)
- * Offseason or practice squad member only

Career NFL statistics
- Receptions: 2
- Receiving yards: 25
- Stats at Pro Football Reference

Daylen Baldwin (born November 24, 1999) is an American professional football wide receiver. He most recently played for the Calgary Stampeders of the Canadian Football League (CFL). He played college football at Morgan State, Jackson State, and Michigan.

== Early life ==
Baldwin played high school football at Farmington High School and Waterford Mott High School.

== College career ==
Baldwin began his college football career at Morgan State. As a freshman in 2017, he appeared in 11 games and caught 16 passes for 181 receiving yards and one touchdown. As a sophomore, he appeared in 14 games and caught 14 passes for 152 receiving yards and one touchdown.

He transferred to Jackson State in 2019 and redshirted during the 2019 season. He appeared in six games for Jackson State during its spring 2021 season and led the Southwestern Athletic Conference with 27 receptions for 540 yards (90 yards per game) and seven touchdowns.

After a strong showing in the spring season, Baldwin was recruited as a graduate transfer by Ohio State, Penn State, and Michigan. He chose Michigan.

In Michigan's season opener against Western Michigan, Baldwin had a 69-yard touchdown reception from J. J. McCarthy. He added a 56-yard touchdown reception against Wisconsin on October 2. On January 5, 2022, Baldwin declared for the 2022 NFL draft.

== Professional career ==
Pre-draft measurables
| Height | Weight | Arm length | Hand span | 40-yard dash | 10-yard split | 20-yard split | 20-yard shuttle | Vertical jump | Broad jump | Bench press |
|---|---|---|---|---|---|---|---|---|---|---|
| 6 ft 1 7/8 in (1.88 m) | 218 lb (99 kg) | 31 3/4 in (0.81 m) | 9 1/2 in (0.24 m) | 4.71 s | 1.63 s | 2.68 s | 4.44 s | 34.5 in (0.88 m) | 10 ft 0 in (3.05 m) | 16 reps |
All values from Pro Day

=== Cleveland Browns ===
On August 3, 2022, Baldwin signed with the Cleveland Browns as an undrafted free agent. He was waived by the Browns on August 30, 2022. He was signed to the Browns' practice squad the next day on August 31, 2022. He signed a reserve/future contract on January 9, 2023. He was waived on August 4, 2023.

=== Minnesota Vikings ===
On November 22, 2023, Baldwin signed with the Minnesota Vikings. He was released on December 12. He signed a reserve/future contract on January 16, 2024. He was waived on May 7, 2024.

=== Atlanta Falcons ===
On May 22, 2024, Baldwin signed with the Atlanta Falcons. He was cut on August 1.

=== Arizona Cardinals ===
On August 13, 2024, Baldwin signed with the Arizona Cardinals. He was waived on August 26.

=== Calgary Stampeders ===
Baldwin was signed by the Calgary Stampeders on January 21, 2025. He played in two games where he had six receptions for 110 yards and one touchdown. He finished the season on the practice roster and his contract expired on November 2, 2025.
