= David Ojabo =

Scottish-Nigerian gridiron football player (born 2000)

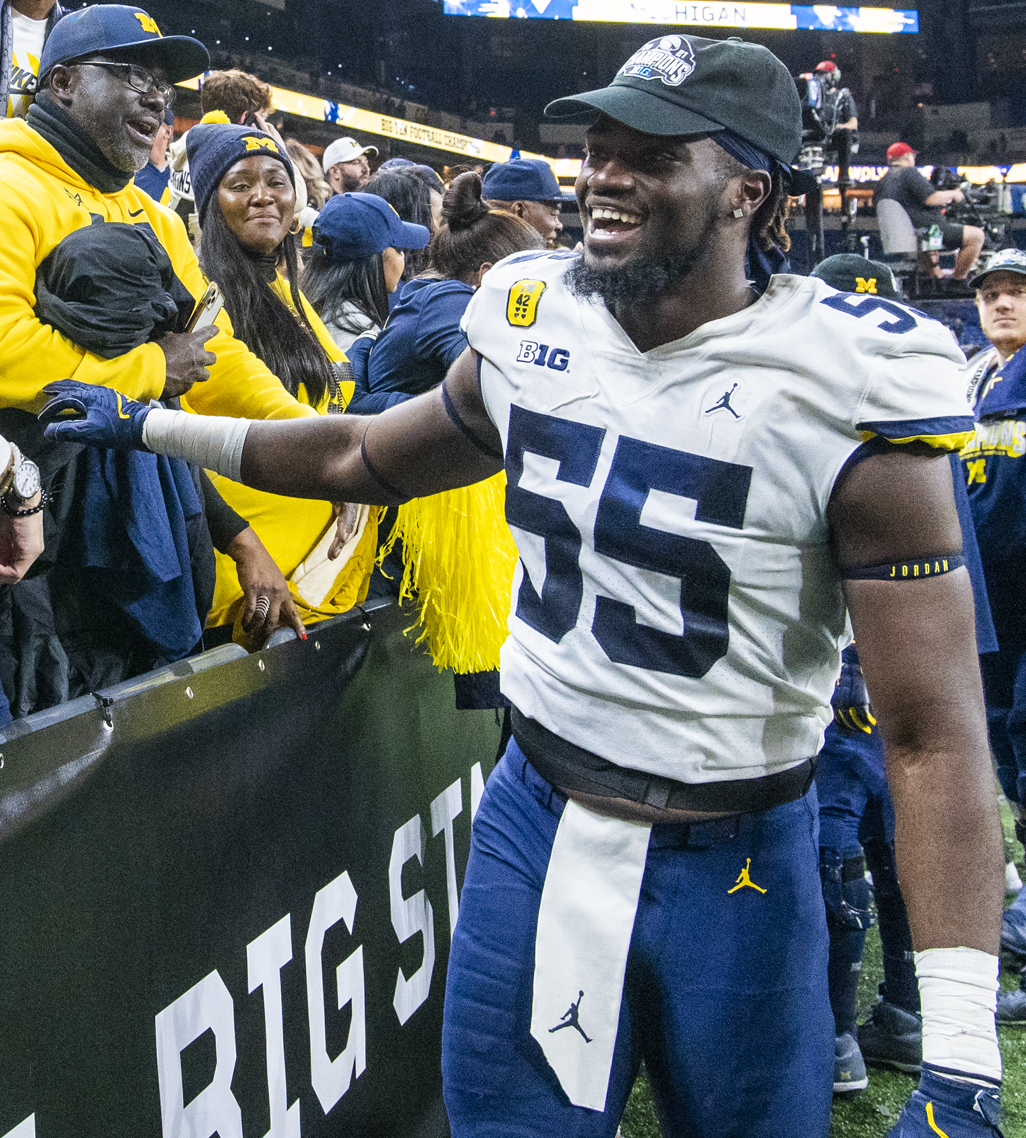
- Ojabo with the Michigan Wolverines in 2021

No. 56 – New Orleans Saints
- Position: Linebacker
- Roster status: Practice squad

Personal information
- Born: 17 May 2000 (age 26); Port Harcourt, Nigeria
- Listed height: 6 ft 4 in (1.93 m)
- Listed weight: 256 lb (116 kg)

Career information
- High school: Blair Academy (Blairstown, New Jersey, U.S.)
- College: Michigan (2019–2021)
- NFL draft: 2022: 2nd round, 45th overall pick

Career history
- Baltimore Ravens (2022–2025); Miami Dolphins (2026)*; New Orleans Saints (2026–present)*
- * Offseason or practice squad member only

Awards and highlights
- Second-team All-American (2021); First-team All-Big Ten (2021)

Career NFL statistics as of 2025
- Total tackles: 32
- Sacks: 4.5
- Forced fumbles: 2
- Stats at Pro Football Reference

David Ojabo (born 17 May 2000) is a Nigerian-Scottish professional American football linebacker for the New Orleans Saints of the National Football League (NFL). He was an All-American college football player for the Michigan Wolverines, and was selected by the Ravens in the second round of the 2022 NFL draft.

== Early life ==
Ojabo was born in Port Harcourt, Nigeria, in 2000 and moved to Aberdeen, Scotland with his family in 2007. At 17, he moved to Blairstown, New Jersey, in the United States and began attending Blair Academy. He initially played basketball before switching to American football. Ojabo committed to the University of Michigan to play college football in part because the Michigan weather was similar to Scotland and made him feel at home.

== College career ==
Ojabo did not play his first year at Michigan in 2019. As a sophomore in 2020, he played in six games and made one tackle. Ojabo took over as a starter in 2021. On January 4, 2022, he announced that he would forgo his senior year and enter the draft.

While performing on Pro Day at Michigan, Ojabo suffered a left ankle injury while performing a drill. It was later confirmed that he had suffered a torn Achilles.

== Professional career ==
Pre-draft measurables
Height	Weight	Arm length	Hand span	Wingspan	40-yard dash	10-yard split	20-yard split	20-yard shuttle	Vertical jump	Broad jump
6 ft 4 in (1.93 m)	250 lb (113 kg)	33 1/2 in (0.85 m)	9 in (0.23 m)	6 ft 8 3/4 in (2.05 m)	4.55 s	1.64 s	2.64 s	4.45 s	35.0 in (0.89 m)	10 ft 2 in (3.10 m)
All values from NFL Combine

=== Baltimore Ravens ===
Ojabo was drafted by the Baltimore Ravens in the second round, 45th overall, of the 2022 NFL draft. He was placed on injured reserve on 31 August 2022 as he continued to recover from the Achilles injury he suffered in March. He was activated on November 1st. He recorded his first sack in Week 18 in of the 2022 season against the Bengals.

On 30 September 2023, Ojabo was placed on injured reserve.

=== Miami Dolphins ===
On 16 March 2026, Ojabo signed with the Miami Dolphins. On 30 August, he was released by the Dolphins as a part of final roster cuts.

=== New Orleans Saints ===
On October 1, 2026, Ojabo signed with the New Orleans Saints practice squad.
