= Vincent Gray (American football) =

American gridiron football player (born 1999)

Profile
- Position: Defensive back

Personal information
- Born: December 28, 1999 (age 26); Rochester, Michigan, U.S.
- Listed height: 6 ft 2 in (1.88 m)
- Listed weight: 192 lb (87 kg)

Career information
- High school: Rochester Adams (Rochester Hills, Michigan)
- College: Michigan (2018–2021)
- NFL draft: 2022: undrafted

Career history
- New Orleans Saints (2022–2023)*; Los Angeles Rams (2023)*; Cleveland Browns (2023); Arlington Renegades (2025)*; Toronto Argonauts (2026)*
- * Offseason or practice squad member only

Awards and highlights
- Third-team All-Big Ten (2021)

Career NFL statistics
- Total tackles: 5
- Pass deflections: 2
- Stats at Pro Football Reference
- Stats at CFL.ca

Vincent Gray (born December 28, 1999) is an American professional football defensive back. He played college football for the Michigan Wolverines.

== Early life ==
Gray attended high school at Rochester Adams. Coming out of high school, Gray was rated as a three-star prospect. Gray decided to commit to play college football for the Michigan Wolverines.

== College career ==
In Gray's career at Michigan, he played three seasons for the Wolverines, appearing in 28 games, totalling 91 tackles with five going for a loss, a sack, 15 pass deflections, and a forced fumble. After the conclusion of the 2021 season, Gray decided to declare for the 2022 NFL draft.

== Professional career ==
Pre-draft measurables
Height	Weight	Arm length	Hand span	Wingspan	40-yard dash	10-yard split	20-yard split	Vertical jump	Broad jump
6 ft 2 1/4 in (1.89 m)	192 lb (87 kg)	32 3/8 in (0.82 m)	9 1/4 in (0.23 m)	6 ft 6 1/8 in (1.98 m)	4.54 s	1.59 s	2.66 s	34.0 in (0.86 m)	10 ft 2 in (3.10 m)
All values from NFL Combine/Pro Day

=== New Orleans Saints ===
After not being selected in the 2022 NFL draft, Gray signed with the New Orleans Saints as an undrafted free agent. On August 30, 2022, Gray was released by the Saints during final roster cuts, but was signed to the team's practice squad the following day. After spending the entire 2022 season on the Saints practice squad, Gray signed a futures contract with the Saints. On May 15, 2023, Gray was waived by the Saints.

=== Los Angeles Rams ===
One day later on May 16, 2023, Gray was claimed off waivers by the Los Angeles Rams. During final roster cuts, he was waived by the Rams.

=== Cleveland Browns ===
On November 7, 2023, Gray signed to the Cleveland Browns practice squad. He was elevated to the active roster and made his NFL debut in the team's Week 18 season finale, posting five tackles and two pass deflections. He signed a reserve/future contract on January 15, 2024.

Gray was waived with an injury designation on August 12, 2024.

=== Arlington Renegades ===
On January 9, 2025, Gray signed with the Arlington Renegades of the United Football League (UFL). He was released on March 20, 2025.

=== Toronto Argonauts ===
On March 2, 2026, it was announced that Gray had signed with the Toronto Argonauts. He was released on May 31 as part of final roster cuts.
