= Christopher Hinton (American football) =

American football player (born 2000)

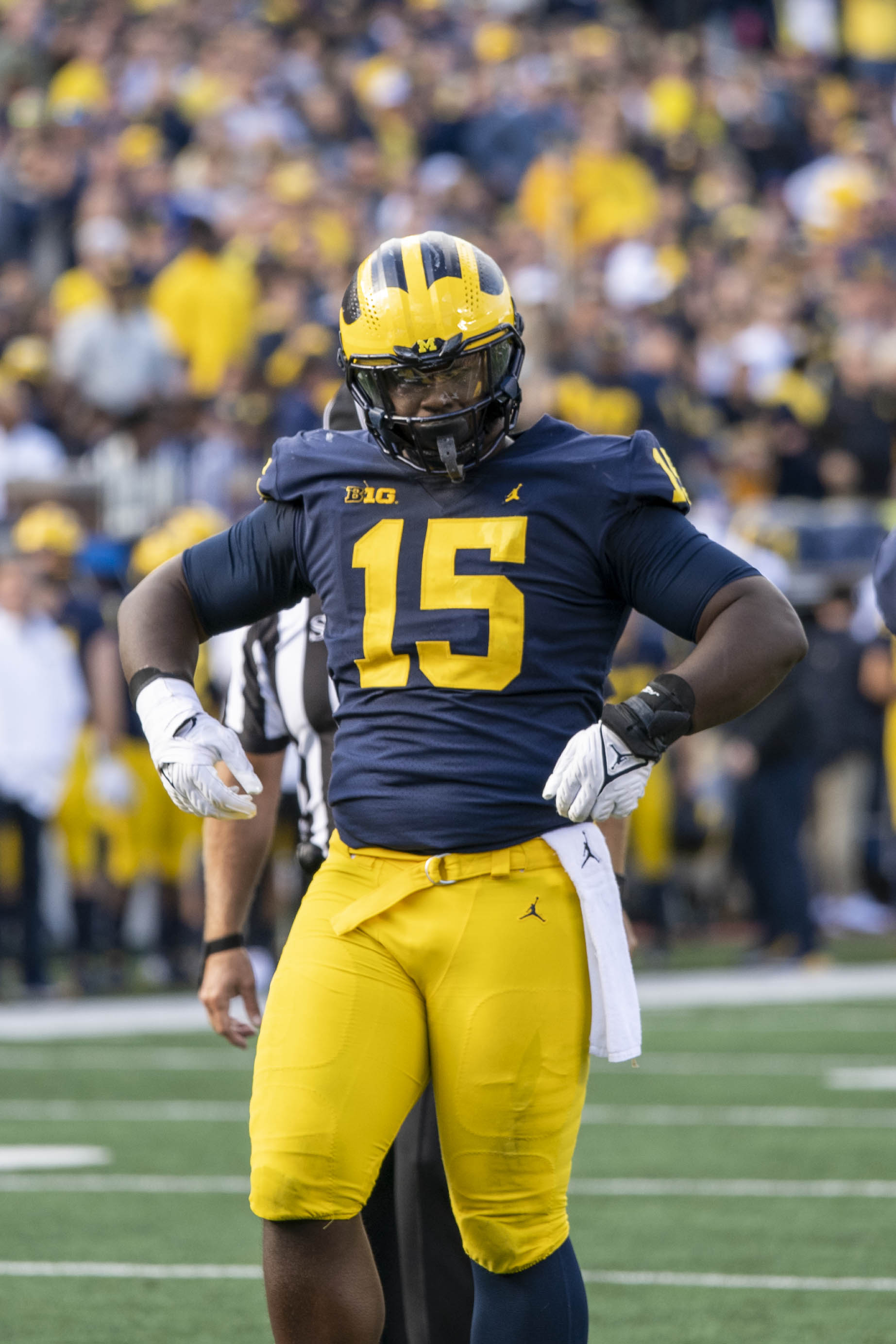
- Hinton with Michigan in 2021

Profile
- Position: Nose tackle

Personal information
- Born: September 14, 2000 (age 26); Johns Creek, Georgia, U.S.
- Listed height: 6 ft 4 in (1.93 m)
- Listed weight: 310 lb (141 kg)

Career information
- High school: Greater Atlanta Christian School
- College: Michigan (2019–2021)
- NFL draft: 2022: undrafted

Career history
- New York Giants (2022)*; Miami Dolphins (2022)*; Atlanta Falcons (2022)*; Los Angeles Chargers (2022–2024); Louisville Kings (2026)*
- * Offseason or practice squad member only

Career NFL statistics as of 2023
- Total tackles: 13
- Stats at Pro Football Reference

Christopher Hinton Jr. (born September 14, 2000) is an American professional football nose tackle. He played college football for the Michigan Wolverines.

== Early life ==
Hinton attended Greater Atlanta Christian School. He is the son of former All-Pro offensive lineman Chris Hinton, and the older brother of Myles Hinton.

He played in the 2019 U.S. Army All-American Bowl, and was a five-star recruit. Hinton committed to play for the University of Michigan over offers from Ohio State, Georgia, Clemson, Stanford, and others.

== College career ==
Hinton played at Michigan from 2019 to 2021. As a true freshman in 2019, Hinton appeared in 12 games, starting one and had nine tackles on the season. In 2020, he played in 6 games making four starts with 13 tackles and his first career sack. During his junior season in 2021, Hinton started all 14 games on the defensive line. He racked up 33 tackles with two for loss and one sack. He also forced one fumble and had two fumble recoveries while earning honorable mention All-Big Ten honors.

After his junior season, Hinton declared for the 2022 NFL draft.

== Professional career ==
Pre-draft measurables
| Height | Weight | Arm length | Hand span | 40-yard dash | 10-yard split | 20-yard split | 20-yard shuttle | Three-cone drill | Vertical jump | Broad jump | Bench press |
|---|---|---|---|---|---|---|---|---|---|---|---|
| 6 ft 3 5/8 in (1.92 m) | 305 lb (138 kg) | 32 3/8 in (0.82 m) | 10 1/2 in (0.27 m) | 5.28 s | 1.74 s | 2.98 s | 4.85 s | 7.90 s | 31.5 in (0.80 m) | 8 ft 10 in (2.69 m) | 25 reps |

=== New York Giants ===
Hinton went undrafted in the 2022 NFL draft, but was signed as an undrafted free agent by the New York Giants. After spending training camp with the team, the Giants waived Hinton on August 19.

=== Miami Dolphins ===
On September 5, 2022, Hinton was signed to the practice squad of the Miami Dolphins. He was released on September 19.

=== Atlanta Falcons ===
On October 7, 2022, the Atlanta Falcons signed Hinton to the practice squad. He was released on October 10.

=== Los Angeles Chargers ===
On November 9, 2022, Hinton signed with the Los Angeles Chargers. He made his NFL debut on December 11 against the Dolphins. On December 20, the Chargers signed Hinton to their active roster.

On November 5, 2023, Hinton was waived by the Chargers and re-signed to the practice squad. He signed a reserve/future contract on January 11, 2024.

On August 27, 2024, Hinton was waived by the Chargers and re-signed to the practice squad the following day. He signed a reserve/future contract on January 13, 2025.

On August 26, 2025, Hinton was waived by the Chargers.

=== Louisville Kings ===
On January 14, 2026, Hinton was selected by the Louisville Kings of the United Football League (UFL). He was released on March 19.
