= List of NFL players (J) =

This is a list of players who have appeared in at least one regular season or postseason game in the National Football League (NFL), American Football League (AFL), or All-America Football Conference (AAFC) and have a last name that starts with "J". This list is accurate through the end of the 2025 NFL season.

== Jac ==
- Eric Jack
- Myles Jack
- Chris Jacke
- Adoree' Jackson
- Al Jackson
- Alaric Jackson
- Alcender Jackson
- Alfred Jackson (born 1955)
- Alfred Jackson (born 1967)
- Alonzo Jackson
- Andrew Jackson (born 1964)
- Andrew Jackson (born 1992)
- Arnold Jackson
- Asa Jackson
- Austin Jackson
- Bennett Jackson
- Bernard Jackson (born 1950)
- Bernard Jackson (born 1980)
- Bill Jackson
- Billy Jackson
- Bo Jackson
- Bob Jackson
- Bobby Jackson (born 1936)
- Bobby Jackson (born 1940)
- Bobby Jackson (born 1956)
- Brad Jackson
- Branden Jackson
- Brandon Jackson
- Brennan Jackson
- Brian Jackson
- Calvin Jackson
- Cam Jackson
- Cedric Jackson
- Chad Jackson
- Charles Jackson (born 1955)
- Charles Jackson (born 1962)
- Charlie Jackson
- Chevis Jackson
- Chris Jackson (born 1975)
- Chris Jackson (born 1998)
- Cleveland Jackson
- Corey Jackson
- Curtis Jackson
- Dane Jackson
- Darius Jackson
- Darrell Jackson
- David Jackson
- Deon Jackson
- DeSean Jackson
- Dexter Jackson (born 1977)
- Dexter Jackson (born 1986)
- D'Marco Jackson
- Don Jackson (born 1913)
- Don Jackson (born 1993)
- Donovan Jackson
- Donte Jackson
- D'Qwell Jackson
- Drake Jackson
- Earnest Jackson
- Eddie Jackson (born 1980)
- Eddie Jackson (born 1992)
- Edwin Jackson
- Enis Jackson
- Ernie Jackson
- Frank Jackson
- Fred Jackson
- Frisman Jackson
- Gabe Jackson
- Gerald Jackson
- Grady Jackson
- Greg Jackson
- Harold Jackson
- Honor Jackson
- Jack Jackson
- Jamaal Jackson
- James Jackson
- Jarious Jackson
- Jazz Jackson
- J.C. Jackson
- Jeff Jackson
- Jermaine Jackson
- Jerrell Jackson
- Jha'Quan Jackson
- Jim Jackson
- Joe Jackson (born 1962)
- Joe Jackson (born 1996)
- Joey Jackson
- John Jackson (born 1965)
- John Jackson (born 1967)
- Johnnie Jackson
- Johnny Jackson
- Jonah Jackson
- Jonathan Jackson
- Jordan Jackson
- Josh Jackson
- Justin Jackson
- Kareem Jackson
- Kearis Jackson
- Keith Jackson
- Ken Jackson
- Kenny Jackson
- Keondre Jackson
- Kirby Jackson
- LaDairis Jackson
- Lamar Jackson (born 1997)
- Lamar Jackson (born 1998)
- Landon Jackson
- Larron Jackson
- Larry Jackson
- Lawrence Jackson (born 1964)
- Lawrence Jackson (born 1985)
- Lenzie Jackson
- Leonard Jackson
- Leroy Jackson
- Louis Jackson
- Lucky Jackson
- Malik Jackson
- Marcus Jackson
- Mark Jackson (born 1962)
- Mark Jackson (born 1963)
- Marlin Jackson
- Marlion Jackson
- Matthew Jackson
- McKinnley Jackson
- Melvin Jackson
- Michael Jackson (born 1957)
- Michael Jackson (born 1969)
- Mike Jackson
- Monte Jackson
- Nate Jackson
- Nick Jackson
- Noah Jackson
- Perry Jackson
- Pete Jackson
- Randy Jackson (born 1944)
- Randy Jackson (born 1948)
- Rashawn Jackson
- Ray Jackson
- Raymond Jackson
- Red Jackson
- Rich Jackson
- Rickey Jackson
- Rob Jackson
- Robert Jackson (born 1953)
- Robert Jackson (born 1954)
- Robert Jackson (born 1958)
- Robert Jackson (born 1993)
- Roger Jackson
- Roland Jackson
- Rusty Jackson
- Shedrick Jackson
- Sheldon Jackson
- Steve Jackson (born 1942)
- Steve Jackson (born 1955)
- Steve Jackson (born 1969)
- Steven Jackson
- Storey Jackson
- T. J. Jackson (born 1943)
- T. J. Jackson (born 1983)
- Tanard Jackson
- Tarron Jackson
- Tarvaris Jackson
- Terry Jackson (born 1955)
- Terry Jackson (born 1976)
- Theo Jackson
- Tim Jackson
- Tom Jackson
- Tre' Jackson
- Trishton Jackson
- Tyoka Jackson
- Tyree Jackson
- Tyson Jackson
- Vestee Jackson
- Victor Jackson
- Vincent Jackson
- Waverly Jackson
- Wilbur Jackson
- William Jackson III
- Willie Jackson
- Frank Jackunas
- Allen Jacobs
- Ben Jacobs
- Brandon Jacobs
- Cam Jacobs
- Curtis Jacobs
- Dave Jacobs
- Demontrey Jacobs
- Harry Jacobs
- Jack Jacobs
- Jerry Jacobs
- Josh Jacobs
- Leon Jacobs
- Marv Jacobs
- Nic Jacobs
- Proverb Jacobs
- Ray Jacobs (born 1938)
- Ray Jacobs (born 1972)
- Stan Jacobs
- Taylor Jacobs
- Tim Jacobs
- Tramain Jacobs
- Jack Jacobson
- Larry Jacobson
- Steve Jacobson
- Joe Jacoby
- Mitch Jacoby
- Kendyl Jacox
- Michael Jacquet
- Nate Jacquet
- Jim Jacquith
- Harry Jacunski

== Jae–Jef ==
- Jeff Jaeger
- Johnny Jaffurs
- Chick Jagade
- Harry Jagielski
- Brenden Jaimes
- Van Jakes
- George Jakowenko
- Lefty Jamerson
- Natrell Jamerson
- Andre James
- Angelo James
- Arrike James
- Bradie James
- Brandon James
- Cedric James
- Charles James
- Claudis James
- Cory James
- Craig James (born 1961)
- Craig James (born 1996)
- D. J. James
- Dan James
- Derwin James
- Dick James
- Edgerrin James
- Erasmus James
- Garry James
- Javarris James
- Ja'Wuan James
- Jeno James
- Jesse James (born 1971)
- Jesse James (born 1994)
- John James
- Jordan James
- June James
- LaMichael James
- Lionel James
- Lynn James
- Mike James
- Nate James
- Phillip James
- Po James
- Richie James
- Robert James (born 1947)
- Robert James (born 1983)
- Roland James
- Shemar James
- Ted James
- Tommy James
- Toran James
- Tory James
- Larry Jameson
- Michael Jameson
- Dick Jamieson
- Rob Jamieson
- Al Jamison
- Brandon Jamison
- D'Shawn Jamison
- George Jamison
- Tim Jamison
- Quentin Jammer
- John Janata
- Bobby Jancik
- Clarence Janecek
- Chuck Janerette
- Ernie Janet
- Len Janiak
- Tom Janik
- Sebastian Janikowski
- Jeff Janis
- Keever Jankovich
- Bruce Jankowski
- Eddie Jankowski
- Andy Janovich
- Vic Janowicz
- Val Jansante
- J. J. Jansen
- Jon Jansen
- Whitey Jansing
- Mike January
- Paul Janus
- Paul Jappe
- Jon Jaqua
- Pete Jaquess
- Mike Jarmoluk
- Jeremy Jarmon
- Ilia Jarostchuk
- Craig Jarrett
- Dwayne Jarrett
- Grady Jarrett
- Jaiquawn Jarrett
- Kyshoen Jarrett
- Rakim Jarrett
- Tyrique Jarrett
- Toimi Jarvi
- Bruce Jarvis
- Curt Jarvis
- Ralph Jarvis
- Ray Jarvis
- Richard Jarvis
- Blake Jarwin
- Ed Jasper
- Vince Jasper
- Floyd Jaszewski
- Dick Jauron
- Heinie Jawish
- Matt Jaworski
- Ron Jaworski
- Garth Jax
- Craig Jay
- David Jaynes
- Lestar Jean
- Javontae Jean-Baptiste
- Stanley Jean-Baptiste
- Garland Jean-Batiste
- Shemar Jean-Charles
- Ricky Jean-Francois
- Max Jean-Gilles
- Lemuel Jeanpierre
- Ashton Jeanty
- Rashad Jeanty
- Ralph Jecha
- Jackson Jeffcoat
- Jim Jeffcoat
- Ed Jeffers
- Patrick Jeffers
- A. J. Jefferson
- Ben Jefferson
- Billy Jefferson
- Charles Jefferson
- D. C. Jefferson
- Greg Jefferson
- James Jefferson
- Jason Jefferson
- Jermar Jefferson
- John Jefferson
- Jordan Jefferson
- Joseph Jefferson
- Justin Jefferson
- Kevin Jefferson
- Malik Jefferson
- Norman Jefferson
- Quinton Jefferson
- Roy Jefferson
- Shawn Jefferson
- Thad Jefferson
- Tony Jefferson
- Van Jefferson
- Willie Jefferson
- Alshon Jeffery
- Tony Jeffery
- Haywood Jeffires
- Neal Jeffrey
- Bob Jeffries
- Curtis Jeffries
- Dameian Jeffries
- Eric Jeffries
- Greg Jeffries

== Jel–Joe ==
- Jon Jelacic
- Tom Jelesky
- Tom Jelley
- Dietrich Jells
- Jimmy Jemail
- Bob Jencks
- Noel Jenke
- A. J. Jenkins (born 1966)
- A. J. Jenkins (born 1989)
- Al Jenkins
- Alfred Jenkins
- Billy Jenkins
- Brandon Jenkins
- Carlos Jenkins
- Corey Jenkins
- Cullen Jenkins
- Darnell Jenkins
- DeRon Jenkins
- Ed Jenkins
- E. J. Jenkins
- Elgton Jenkins
- Fletcher Jenkins
- Greg Jenkins
- Izel Jenkins
- J.R. Jenkins
- Jack Jenkins
- James Jenkins
- Janoris Jenkins
- Jarvis Jenkins
- Jelani Jenkins
- John Jenkins (born 1975)
- John Jenkins (born 1989)
- Jon Jenkins
- Jordan Jenkins
- Julian Jenkins
- Justin Jenkins
- Ken Jenkins
- Keonta Jenkins
- Kerry Jenkins
- Keyvan Jenkins
- Kris Jenkins (born 1979)
- Kris Jenkins (born 2001)
- Leon Jenkins
- Malcolm Jenkins
- MarTay Jenkins
- Melvin Jenkins
- Michael Jenkins
- Mike Jenkins (born 1974)
- Mike Jenkins (born 1985)
- Rayshawn Jenkins
- Robert Jenkins
- Ronney Jenkins
- Teven Jenkins
- Trezelle Jenkins
- Walt Jenkins
- Adam Jennings
- Anfernee Jennings
- Brandon Jennings
- Brian Jennings
- Chris Jennings
- Darius Jennings
- Dave Jennings
- Donovan Jennings
- Gary Jennings Jr
- Greg Jennings
- Jack Jennings
- Jauan Jennings
- Jim Jennings
- Jonas Jennings
- Keith Jennings
- Kelly Jennings
- Ligarius Jennings
- Lou Jennings
- M. D. Jennings
- Michael Jennings
- Rashad Jennings
- Rick Jennings
- Stanford Jennings
- Terrell Jennings
- Tim Jennings
- Ray Jennison
- Bob Jensen
- Derrick Jensen
- Greg Jensen
- Jerry Jensen
- Jim Jensen (born 1953)
- Jim Jensen (born 1958)
- Marcel Jensen
- Nash Jensen
- Ryan Jensen
- Leo Jensvold
- Luther Jeralds
- Greg Jerman
- Jerrel Jernigan
- Timmy Jernigan
- Tony Jerod-Eddie
- Lorenzo Jerome
- Michael Jerrell
- John Jerry
- Peria Jerry
- Mark Jerue
- Travis Jervey
- Ernie Jessen
- Ron Jessie
- Tim Jessie
- Bill Jessup
- Bob Jeter
- Donovan Jeter
- Gary Jeter
- Gene Jeter
- Perry Jeter
- Tommy Jeter
- Tony Jeter
- Cliff Jetmore
- James Jett
- John Jett (born 1918)
- John Jett (born 1968)
- Paul Jetton
- Jerry Jeudy
- Gabe Jeudy-Lally
- Josey Jewell
- Bob Jewett
- Dan Jiggetts
- Dan Jilek
- Dwayne Jiles
- Arthur Jimerson
- Ade Jimoh
- Steve Joachim
- Josh Jobe
- Bill Jobko
- Art Jocher
- Jim Jodat
- Billy Joe
- Larry Joe
- Leon Joe
- Luke Joeckel
- Greg Joelson
- Herb Joesting

== Joh ==
- Ove Johansson
- Ulrick John
- Ed Johns
- Freeman Johns
- Paul Johns
- Pete Johns
- A. J. Johnson
- Al Johnson (born 1922)
- Al Johnson (born 1950)
- Al Johnson (born 1979)
- Albert Johnson
- Alex Johnson
- Alexander Johnson
- Alonzo Johnson (born 1963)
- Alonzo Johnson (born 1973)
- Amar Johnson
- Andre Johnson (born 1973)
- Andre Johnson (born 1981)
- Andy Johnson
- Anthony Johnson (born 1967)
- Anthony Johnson (born 1993)
- Anthony Johnson (born 2000)
- Antonio Johnson (born 1984)
- Antonio Johnson (born 2001)
- Art Johnson
- Austin Johnson (born 1989)
- Austin Johnson (born 1994)
- Barry Johnson
- Benny Johnson
- Bert Johnson
- Bethel Johnson
- Bill Johnson (born 1916)
- Bill Johnson (born 1921)
- Bill Johnson (born 1926)
- Bill Johnson (born 1944)
- Bill Johnson (born 1960)
- Bill Johnson (born 1968)
- Billy Johnson (born 1943)
- Billy Johnson (born 1952)
- Bob Johnson
- Bobby Johnson (born 1960)
- Bobby Johnson (born 1961)
- Brad Johnson
- Brandon Johnson (born 1983)
- Brandon Johnson (born 1998)
- Brandon Johnson (born 2003)
- Brent Johnson
- Brian Johnson
- Bruce Johnson
- Bryan Johnson
- Bryant Johnson
- Buddy Johnson
- Butch Johnson
- Byron Johnson
- Cade Johnson
- Caleb Johnson
- Calvin Johnson
- Cam Johnson
- Carl Johnson
- Carroll Johnson
- Cecil Johnson (born 1921)
- Cecil Johnson (born 1955)
- Cedric Johnson
- Chad Johnson
- Charles Johnson (born 1956)
- Charles Johnson (born 1957)
- Charles Johnson (born 1972)
- Charles Johnson (born 1986)
- Charles Johnson (born 1989)
- Charley Johnson
- Charlie Johnson (born 1944)
- Charlie Johnson (born 1952)
- Charlie Johnson (born 1984)
- Chris Johnson (born 1960)
- Chris Johnson (born 1971)
- Chris Johnson (born 1979)
- Chris Johnson (born 1985)
- Chuck Johnson (born March 5, 1969)
- Chuck Johnson (born May 22, 1969)
- Clyde Johnson (born 1917)
- Clyde Johnson (born 1970)
- Collin Johnson
- Cornelius Johnson
- Curley Johnson
- Curtis Johnson (born 1948)
- Curtis Johnson (born 1985)
- D'Ernest Johnson
- D. J. Johnson (born 1966)
- D. J. Johnson (born 1985)
- Damaris Johnson
- Damian Johnson
- Damone Johnson
- Dan Johnson
- Daniel Johnson
- Danny Johnson
- Darcy Johnson
- Darius Johnson
- Darrien Johnson
- Darrius Johnson
- Darryl Johnson
- Daryl Johnson
- David Johnson (born 1987)
- David Johnson (born 1991)
- Demetrious Johnson
- Dennis Johnson (born 1951)
- Dennis Johnson (born 1956)
- Dennis Johnson (born 1958)
- Dennis Johnson (born 1979)
- Dennis Johnson (born 1990)
- Derrick Johnson (born February 9, 1982)
- Derrick Johnson (born November 22, 1982)
- Desjuan Johnson
- Dick Johnson
- Diontae Johnson
- Dirk Johnson
- D. J. Johnson
- Don Johnson (born 1920)
- Don Johnson (born 1931)
- Donnell Johnson
- Dontae Johnson
- Doug Johnson
- Duke Johnson
- Dustin Johnson
- Dwight Johnson
- Dyontae Johnson
- Earl Johnson
- Ed Johnson
- Eddie Johnson (born 1959)
- Eddie Johnson (born 1981)
- Ellis Johnson (born 1943)
- Ellis Johnson (born 1973)
- Eric Johnson (born 1952)
- Eric Johnson (born 1976)
- Eric Johnson (born 1979)
- Eric Johnson (born 1998)
- Essex Johnson
- Ezra Johnson
- Farnham Johnson
- Filmel Johnson
- Flip Johnson
- Fred Johnson
- Garrett Johnson
- Gartrell Johnson
- Gary Johnson
- Gene Johnson
- George Johnson
- Gil Johnson
- Gilvanni Johnson
- Glenn Johnson
- Greg Johnson (born 1953)
- Greg Johnson (born 1964)
- Gregg Johnson
- Harvey Johnson
- Henry Johnson
- Herb Johnson
- Herbert Johnson
- Holbert Johnson
- Hoss Johnson
- Isaiah Johnson (born May 1992)
- Isaiah Johnson (born October 1992)
- Isaiah Johnson (born 1995)
- Isaiah Johnson (born 2000)
- J. J. Johnson
- J.R. Johnson
- Jack Johnson (born 1909)
- Jack Johnson (born 1933)
- Jakob Johnson
- Jaleel Johnson
- Jamar Johnson
- James Johnson (born 1962)
- James Johnson (born 1984)
- James-Michael Johnson
- Jamon Dumas-Johnson
- Jaquan Johnson
- Jarret Johnson
- Jason Johnson (born 1965)
- Jason Johnson (born 1974)
- Jay Johnson
- Jaylen Johnson
- Jaylon Johnson
- Jaymar Johnson
- Jeremi Johnson
- Jeremiah Johnson
- Jermaine Johnson II
- Jerome Johnson
- Jeron Johnson
- Jerry Johnson (born 1894)
- Jerry Johnson (born 1977)
- Jesse Johnson
- Jim Johnson
- Jimmie Johnson
- Jimmy Johnson (born 1938)
- Joe Johnson (born 1926)
- Joe Johnson (born 1929)
- Joe Johnson (born 1962)
- Joe Johnson (born 1972)
- John Johnson (born 1941)
- John Johnson (born 1968)
- John Johnson (born 1995)
- John Henry Johnson
- Johnnie Johnson
- Johnny Johnson
- Johnny Johnson III
- Josh Johnson (born 1986)
- Josh Johnson (born 1989)
- Josh Johnson (born 1997)
- Jovon Johnson
- Juwan Johnson
- Kaleb Johnson (born 1993)
- Kaleb Johnson (born 2003)
- Kameron Johnson
- Keelan Johnson
- KeeSean Johnson
- Kelley Johnson
- Ken Johnson (born 1947)
- Ken Johnson (born 1955)
- Ken Johnson (born 1956)
- Ken Johnson (born 1966)
- Kenneth Johnson
- Kenny Johnson
- Kermit Johnson
- Kerryon Johnson
- Keshon Johnson
- Kevin Johnson (born 1970)
- Kevin Johnson (born 1976)
- Kevin Johnson (born 1992)
- Keyshawn Johnson
- Kyle Johnson
- Kyron Johnson
- Landon Johnson
- Lane Johnson
- Larry Johnson (born 1909)
- Larry Johnson (born 1979)
- Lawrence Johnson
- Lee Johnson (born 1944)
- Lee Johnson (born 1961)
- Len Johnson (born 1902)
- Len Johnson (born 1946)
- Leon Johnson (born 1904)
- Leon Johnson (born 1974)
- Leonard Johnson
- LeShon Johnson
- Levi Johnson
- Lonnie Johnson
- Lonnie Johnson Jr.
- Lorne Johnson
- Lyndon Johnson
- M. L. Johnson
- Malcolm Johnson (born 1977)
- Malcolm Johnson (born 1992)
- Manuel Johnson
- Marcus Johnson (born 1981)
- Marcus Johnson (born 1994)
- Mario Johnson
- Mark Johnson (born 1953)
- Mark Johnson (born 1964)
- Marquis Johnson
- Marshall Johnson
- Marvin Johnson
- Maurice Johnson
- Melvin Johnson
- Micah Johnson
- Michael Johnson (born 1984)
- Michael Johnson (born 1987)
- Mike Johnson (born 1943)
- Mike Johnson (born April 24, 1962)
- Mike Johnson (born November 26, 1962)
- Mike Johnson (born 1987)
- Mitch Johnson
- Monte Johnson
- Nate Johnson (born 1920)
- Nate Johnson (born 1957)
- Nate Johnson (born 1963)
- Nazeeh Johnson
- Nico Johnson
- Norm Johnson
- Olabisi Johnson
- Olrick Johnson
- Oscar Johnson
- Paris Johnson Jr.
- Pat Johnson
- Patrick Johnson(born 1976)
- Patrick Johnson (born 1998)
- Pepper Johnson
- Pete Johnson (born 1937)
- Pete Johnson (born 1954)
- Pike Johnson
- Preston Johnson
- Quindell Johnson
- Quinn Johnson
- Randell Johnson
- Randy Johnson (born 1944)
- Randy Johnson (born 1953)
- Rashad Johnson
- Ray Johnson
- Raylee Johnson
- Raymond Johnson
- Reggie Johnson
- Riall Johnson
- Rich Johnson
- Richard Johnson (born 1961)
- Richard Johnson (born 1963)
- Rick Johnson
- Rishaw Johnson
- Rob Johnson
- Robert Johnson (born 1980)
- Robert Johnson (born 1987)
- Roderick Johnson
- Ron Johnson (born 1947)
- Ron Johnson (born 1956)
- Ron Johnson (born 1958)
- Ron Johnson (born 1979)
- Ron Johnson (born 1980)
- Roschon Johnson
- Rudi Johnson
- Rudy Johnson
- Rufus Johnson
- Sam Johnson
- Sammy Johnson
- Shelton Johnson
- Sidney Johnson
- Smiley Johnson
- Spencer Johnson
- Spider Johnson
- Stan Johnson
- Steve Johnson
- Steven Johnson
- Stevie Johnson
- Storm Johnson
- T. J. Johnson
- Tank Johnson
- Taron Johnson
- Ted Johnson
- Terrence Johnson
- Teyo Johnson
- Tez Johnson
- Theo Johnson
- Thomas Johnson
- Tim Johnson (born 1965)
- Tim Johnson (born 1978)
- Toby Johnson
- Todd Johnson
- Tom Johnson (born 1931)
- Tom Johnson (born 1984)
- Tommy Johnson
- Tony Johnson
- Tracy Johnson
- Travis Johnson
- Tre' Johnson
- Tre'Von Johnson
- Trevor Johnson
- Troy Johnson (born 1962)
- Troy Johnson (born 1964)
- Trumaine Johnson (born 1960)
- Trumaine Johnson (born 1990)
- Ty Johnson
- Tyler Johnson
- Tyrell Johnson
- Tyrone Johnson
- Tyron Johnson
- Undra Johnson
- Vance Johnson
- Vaughan Johnson
- Walt Johnson
- Walter Johnson (born 1942)
- Walter Johnson (born 1943)
- Walter Johnson (born 1963)
- Wesley Johnson
- Will Johnson (born 1964)
- Will Johnson (born 1988)
- Will Johnson (born 2003)
- Zack Johnson
- Zion Johnson
- Luke Johnsos
- Brian Johnston (born 1962)
- Brian Johnston (born 1986)
- Cameron Johnston
- Clay Johnston
- Daryl Johnston
- Jim Johnston
- Mark Johnston
- Pres Johnston
- Quentin Johnston
- Rex Johnston
- Swede Johnston
- Lance Johnstone

== Joi–Jon ==
- Charlie Joiner
- Tim Joiner
- Vernon Joines
- Evan Jolitz
- Al Jolley
- Doug Jolley
- Gordon Jolley
- Lewis Jolley
- Johnny Jolly
- Ken Jolly
- Mike Jolly
- Shaun Jolly
- Don Jonas
- Marvin Jonas
- Charlie Jonasen
- Eric Jonassen
- Kingsley Jonathan
- A.J. Jones
- Aaron Jones (born 1966)
- Aaron Jones (born 1994)
- Abry Jones
- Adam Jones
- Adrian Jones
- Aki Jones
- Andre Jones
- Andre Jones Jr.
- Andrew Jones
- Andy Jones
- Anthony Jones
- Arrington Jones
- Art Jones
- Arthur Jones
- Barrett Jones
- Ben Jones (born 1899)
- Ben Jones (born 1951)
- Benito Jones
- Bert Jones
- Bill Jones
- Billy Jones
- Bob Jones (born 1945)
- Bob Jones (born 1951)
- Bob Jones (born 1978)
- Bobby Jones (born 1912)
- Bobby Jones (born 1955)
- Boyd Jones
- Brad Jones
- Brandon Jones (born 1982)
- Brandon Jones (born 1998)
- Braxton Jones
- Brent Jones
- Brett Jones
- Brian Jones (born 1968)
- Brian Jones (born 1981)
- Broderick Jones
- Bruce Jones (born 1904)
- Bruce Jones (born 1962)
- Bryant Jones
- Buck Jones
- Byron Jones
- Caleb Jones
- Calvin Jones (born 1951)
- Calvin Jones (born 1970)
- Cam Jones
- Cardale Jones
- Carl Jones
- Cedric Jones (born 1960)
- Cedric Jones (born 1974)
- Chandler Jones (born 1990)
- Charles Jones
- Charley Jones
- Charlie Jones (born 1972)
- Charlie Jones
- Chris Jones (born 1964)
- Chris Jones (born 1971)
- Chris Jones (born 1989)
- Chris Jones (born 1990)
- Chris Jones (born 1994)
- Chris Jones (born 1995)
- Christian Jones (born 1991)
- Christian Jones (born 2000)
- Clarence Jones
- Clinton Jones
- Cody Jones
- Colin Jones
- Curtis Jones
- Cyrus Jones
- Dale Jones
- Damon Jones
- Dan Jones
- Daniel Jones
- Dante Jones
- DaQuan Jones
- Daryl Jones
- Daryll Jones
- Datone Jones
- Dave Jones
- David Jones (born 1961)
- David Jones (born 1968)
- David Jones (born 1985)
- Dawand Jones
- Deacon Jones
- Deion Jones
- Derrick Jones (born 1984)
- Derrick Jones (born 1994)
- Dhani Jones
- D. J. Jones
- Dom Jones
- Dominique Jones
- Don Jones
- Donald Jones (born 1969)
- Donald Jones (born 1987)
- Donnie Jones
- Donta Jones
- Doug Jones
- Dre'Mont Jones
- Dub Jones
- E. J. Jones
- Earl Jones
- Ed Jones
- Ed "Too Tall" Jones
- Eddie Jones
- Edgar Jones (born 1920)
- Edgar Jones (born 1984)
- Elijah Jones
- Ellis Jones
- Elmer Jones
- Emery Jones Jr.
- Ernest Jones (born 1971)
- Ernest Jones (born 1999)
- Ernie Jones (born 1953)
- Ernie Jones (born 1964)
- Ezell Jones
- Felix Jones
- Fred Jones (born 1965)
- Fred Jones (born 1967)
- Fred Jones (born 1977)
- Freddie Jones
- Gary Jones
- Gene Jones
- George Jones
- Gordon Jones
- Greg Jones (born 1948)
- Greg Jones (born 1974)
- Greg Jones (born 1981)
- Greg Jones (born 1988)
- Harris Jones
- Harry Jones
- Harvey Jones
- Hassan Jones
- Henry Jones (born 1946)
- Henry Jones (born 1967)
- Herana-Daze Jones
- Homer Jones
- Horace Jones
- Howard Jones
- Isaac Jones
- Jack Jones
- Jacoby Jones (born 1984)
- Jacoby Jones (born 2001)
- Jamal Jones
- Jamarco Jones
- James Jones (born 1958)
- James Jones (born 1961)
- James Jones (born 1969)
- James Jones (born 1984)
- Jamir Jones
- Jarrian Jones
- Jarvis Jones
- Jason Jones
- Jaylon Jones (born 1997)
- Jaylon Jones (born 2002)
- Jeff Jones
- Jermaine Jones
- Jerry Jones (born 1894)
- Jerry Jones (born 1944)
- Jeshaun Jones
- Jim Jones (born 1920)
- Jim Jones (born 1935)
- Jimmie Jones (born 1947)
- Jimmie Jones (born 1950)
- Jimmie Jones (born 1966)
- Jimmy Jones
- J. J. Jones (born 1952)
- J. J. Jones (born 1978)
- J. J. Jones (born 1992)
- Jock Jones
- Joe Jones (born 1948)
- Joe Jones (born 1962)
- Joey Jones
- John Jones
- Jonathan Jones
- Joseph Jones
- Josh Jones (born 1994)
- Josh Jones (born 1997)
- Julian Jones
- Julio Jones
- Julius Jones
- June Jones
- Justin Jones
- K. C. Jones
- Keandre Jones
- Keith Jones (born February 5, 1966)
- Keith Jones (born March 20, 1966)
- Ken Jones (born 1901)
- Ken Jones (born 1952)
- Kenyatta Jones
- Kevin Jones
- Kim Jones
- Kirk Jones
- Kobe Jones
- LaCurtis Jones
- Lam Jones
- Landry Jones
- Larry Jones
- Lenoy Jones
- Leonard Jones
- Leroy Jones
- Levi Jones
- Lew Jones
- Lyndell Jones
- Mac Jones
- Manny Jones
- Marcus Jones (born 1973)
- Marcus Jones (born 1998)
- Mark Jones
- Marlon Jones
- Marshall Jones
- Marvin Jones (born 1972)
- Marvin Jones (born 1990)
- Matt Jones (born 1983)
- Matt Jones (born 1993)
- Melvin Jones
- Mike Jones (born 1954)
- Mike Jones (born 1960)
- Mike Jones (born 1964)
- Mike Jones (born 1966)
- Mike Jones (born April 15, 1969)
- Mike Jones (born August 25, 1969)
- Naquan Jones
- Nate Jones (born 1982)
- Nate Jones (born 1985)
- Nazair Jones
- Nic Jones
- Onrea Jones
- Patrick Jones II
- Potsy Jones
- Quintin Jones
- Ralph Jones (born 1880)
- Ralph Jones (born 1922)
- Ray Jones
- Reggie Jones (born 1969)
- Reggie Jones (born 1971)
- Reno Jones
- Reshad Jones
- Richard Jones
- Ricky Jones
- Robbie Jones
- Robert Jones (born 1969)
- Robert Jones (born 1999)
- Rod Jones (born March 3, 1964)
- Rod Jones (born March 31, 1964)
- Rod Jones (born 1974)
- Roger Jones
- Ron Jones
- Ronald Jones II
- Rondell Jones
- Rulon Jones
- Rushen Jones
- Sai'vion Jones
- Sam Jones
- Scott Jones
- Sean Jones (born 1962)
- Sean Jones (born 1982)
- Seantavius Jones
- Selwyn Jones
- Shawn Jones
- Sidney Jones
- Spike Jones
- Stan Jones
- Steve Jones
- T. J. Jones
- Taiwan Jones (born 1988)
- Taiwan Jones (born 1993)
- Tebucky Jones
- Terren Jones
- Terry Jones (born 1956)
- Terry Jones (born 1979)
- Tevin Jones
- Thomas Jones
- Thurmon Jones
- Tim Jones
- Todd Jones
- Tom Jones
- Tony Jones (born 1965)
- Tony Jones (born 1966)
- Tony Jones (born 1972)
- Tony Jones Jr.
- Travis Jones
- Truman Jones
- Tyrone Jones (born 1961)
- Tyrone Jones (born 1966)
- Velus Jones Jr.
- Vi Jones
- Victor Jones (born 1966)
- Victor Jones (born 1967)
- Walter Jones
- Wayne Jones
- Willie Jones (born 1939)
- Willie Jones (born 1942)
- Willie Jones (born 1957)
- Willie Jones (born 1975)
- Xavier Jones
- Zay Jones
- Maurice Jones-Drew
- Harold Jones-Quartey
- Jaryd Jones-Smith

== Jop–Ju ==
- Bennie Joppru
- Akeem Jordan
- Andrew Jordan
- Antony Jordan
- Brevin Jordan
- Brian Jordan
- Buford Jordan
- Cameron Jordan
- Charles Jordan
- Curtis Jordan
- Darin Jordan
- David Jordan
- Dion Jordan
- Donald Jordan
- Frank Jordan
- Henry Jordan
- James Jordan
- Jawhar Jordan
- Jeff Jordan (born 1943)
- Jeff Jordan (born 1945)
- Jimmy Jordan
- Ken Jordan
- Kevin Jordan
- LaMont Jordan
- Larry Jordan
- Leander Jordan
- Lee Roy Jordan
- Michael Jordan
- Mike Jordan
- Omari Jordan
- Randy Jordan
- Richard Jordan
- Shelby Jordan
- Steve Jordan (born 1961)
- Steve Jordan (born 1963)
- Tim Jordan
- Tony Jordan
- Tim Jorden
- Carl Jorgensen
- Wagner Jorgensen
- Alex Joseph
- Brandon Joseph
- Davin Joseph
- Dwayne Joseph
- Elvis Joseph
- Greg Joseph
- James Joseph
- Joe Joseph
- Johnathan Joseph
- Karl Joseph
- Keith Joseph
- Kelvin Joseph
- Kerby Joseph
- Kerry Joseph
- Linval Joseph
- Michael Joseph
- Red Joseph
- Ricot Joseph
- Vance Joseph
- William Joseph
- Zip Joseph
- Sebastian Joseph-Day
- Les Josephson
- Steve Josue
- Bob Joswick
- Yonel Jourdain
- Bill Joyce
- Delvin Joyce
- Don Joyce
- Eric Joyce
- Matt Joyce
- Terry Joyce
- L. C. Joyner
- Lamarcus Joyner
- Larry Joyner
- Seth Joyner
- Willie Joyner
- Brian Jozwiak
- Saxon Judd
- Ed Judie
- Quinshon Judkins
- Matthew Judon
- William Judson
- Bhawoh Jue
- Dave Juenger
- P. J. Jules
- Fred Julian
- Jarmar Julien
- Kevin Juma
- Cato June
- Buddy Jungmichel
- E. J. Junior
- Gregory Junior
- Steve Junker
- Mike Junkin
- Trey Junkin
- Joe Jurevicius
- Cam Jurgens
- Michael Jurgens
- Sonny Jurgensen
- Mike Jurich
- Tom Jurich
- Jim Juriga
- Luke Juriga
- Walt Jurkiewicz
- John Jurkovic
- Bob Jury
- Rubin Juster
- Charlie Justice
- Ed Justice
- Steve Justice
- Winston Justice
- Kerry Justin
- Paul Justin
- Sid Justin
- Kyle Juszczyk
- Steve Juzwik
