= Cornelius Johnson =

Cornelius Johnson may refer to:

- Cornelius Johnson (athlete), American high jumper
- Cornelius Johnson (offensive lineman), NFL player
- Cornelius Johnson (artist), English painter, also known as Cornelis van Ceulen Janssens
- Cornelius Johnson (wide receiver), American football wide receiver
- Cornelius Johnson, drummer for the funk band Ohio Players
