= 2020 Michigan Wolverines football team =

American college football season

2020 Michigan Wolverines football
- Conference: Big Ten Conference
- East Division
- Record: 2–4 (2–4 Big Ten)
- Head coach: Jim Harbaugh (6th season)
- Offensive coordinator: Josh Gattis (2nd season)
- Offensive scheme: Pro spread
- Defensive coordinator: Don Brown (5th season)
- Base defense: 4–3
- Captains: Carlo Kemp; Kwity Paye; Josh Ross; Aidan Hutchinson; Ben Mason; Andrew Vastardis; Nick Eubanks
- Home stadium: Michigan Stadium

Uniform
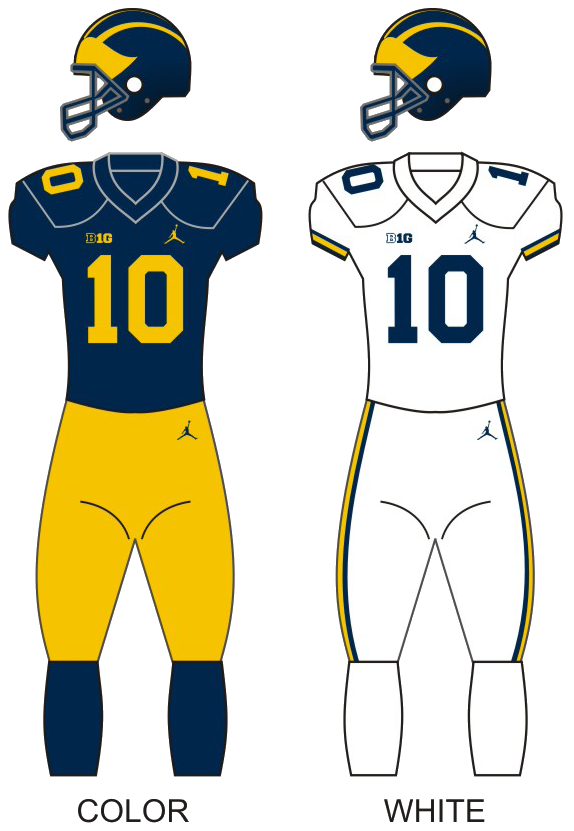

2020 Big Ten Conference football standings
	Conf.			Overall
Team	W		L	W		L
East Division
No. 2 Ohio State xy$^	5	–	0	7	–	1
No. 12 Indiana	6	–	1	6	–	2
Penn State	4	–	5	4	–	5
Maryland	2	–	3	2	–	3
Rutgers	3	–	6	3	–	6
Michigan	2	–	4	2	–	4
Michigan State	2	–	5	2	–	5
West Division
No. 10 Northwestern xy	6	–	1	7	–	2
No. 16 Iowa	6	–	2	6	–	2
Wisconsin	3	–	3	4	–	3
Minnesota	3	–	4	3	–	4
Nebraska	3	–	5	3	–	5
Purdue	2	–	4	2	–	4
Illinois	2	–	6	2	–	6
Championship: Ohio State 22, Northwestern 10
^ – College Football Playoff participant; $ – Conference champion; x – Division champion/co-champions; y – Championship game participant; Note: Due to COVID-19, the Big Ten suspended the season on August 11, but later decided to begin play on October 24. In addition to the title game that was played on December 19, the conference seeded all remaining teams for "championship week" games.; Rankings from AP Poll.

The 2020 Michigan Wolverines football team represented the University of Michigan in the East Division of the Big Ten Conference in the sport of college football during the 2020 NCAA Division I FBS football season. In their sixth year under head coach Jim Harbaugh, the Wolverines played only six games (all against conference opponents) in a season shortened by the COVID-19 pandemic, compiling a 2–4 record.

The Big Ten Conference initially canceled the fall sports season, on August 11, 2020, but reversed course on September 16, announcing an eight-game conference-only schedule. Michigan's previously scheduled nonconference games against Washington, Ball State, and Arkansas State were canceled due to the pandemic. Precautions were taken to promote player, staff, and fan safety, including regular COVID-19 testing, isolation requirements, and mask wearing; games were largely played with no fans in attendance.

Michigan began the year ranked 16th in the preseason AP Poll. In the season's opening game against then-No. 21 Minnesota, Michigan won on the road, 49–24. After rising to 13th in the polls, Michigan was upset by unranked in-state rival Michigan State. After losing two more games against ranked opponents Indiana and Wisconsin, Michigan won a triple-overtime game against Rutgers, and lost to Penn State the following week. Michigan's final three conference games, against Maryland, Ohio State, and Iowa, were canceled due to COVID-19 outbreaks. While the NCAA's win requirements for bowl eligibility were lifted for the season, Michigan was not selected to a bowl game for the first time since 2014.

Quarterback Joe Milton began the season as the team's starting quarterback, but by the end of the season he had been replaced by backup Cade McNamara. The team's leading rusher was Hassan Haskins, with 375 yards, and the team's leading receiver was Ronnie Bell with 401 receiving yards. On defense, lineman Kwity Paye led the team in tackles-for-loss and was named second-team all-conference. Linebacker Josh Ross led the team in tackles.

== Preseason ==
=== Coaching changes ===
It was announced a day after the Citrus Bowl that safeties coach and special teams coordinator Chris Partridge accepted a co-defensive coordinator role at Ole Miss.

=== Coronavirus ===
The COVID-19 pandemic led to the cancellation of all University of Michigan athletic activities during the spring of 2020, including the football team's annual spring game. The pandemic also led to cancellation of the team's international trip for the first time since 2016.

On July 9, the Big Ten Conference announced that it would adopt "a conference-only season" for all sports due to the coronavirus pandemic. The decision resulted in the cancellation of the first three games of Michigan's 2020 season against Washington, Ball State, and Arkansas State.

On August 11, the Big Ten announced that all fall sports, including football, would be indefinitely postponed due to COVID-19. The conference allowed for the possibility of competition in these sports to begin in the spring. However, the conference later announced the season would begin on October 23, with a schedule to be announced on September 19.

=== Recruiting ===
Michigan signed a total of 21 recruits in its 2020 recruiting class, including eight that enrolled early. The class was ranked 10th in the nation by 247Sports and 11th in the nation by Rivals.com.

College recruiting (2020)
Name	Hometown	School	Height	Weight	Commit date
Andrew Gentry; OT	Littleton, Colorado	Columbine High School	6 ft 8 in (2.03 m)	310 lb (140 kg)	Dec 8, 2021
Andrew Gentry; OT	Recruit ratings: Rivals: 247Sports: ESPN:				
A. J. Henning; WR	Frankfort, Illinois	Lincoln-Way East High School	5 ft 10 in (1.78 m)	183 lb (83 kg)	Jun 26, 2019
A. J. Henning; WR	Recruit ratings: Rivals: 247Sports: ESPN:				
Braiden McGregor; DE	Port Huron, Michigan	Port Huron Northern High School	6 ft 5 in (1.96 m)	248 lb (112 kg)	May 24, 2019
Braiden McGregor; DE	Recruit ratings: Rivals: 247Sports: ESPN:				
Blake Corum; RB	Laurel, Maryland	St Frances Academy	5 ft 8 in (1.73 m)	193 lb (88 kg)	Jun 27, 2019
Blake Corum; RB	Recruit ratings: Rivals: 247Sports: ESPN:				
Kalel Mullings; LB	Boston, Massachusetts	Milton Academy	6 ft 1 in (1.85 m)	220 lb (100 kg)	Jun 27, 2019
Kalel Mullings; LB	Recruit ratings: Rivals: 247Sports: ESPN:				
Andre Seldon; CB	Belleville, Michigan	Belleville High School	5 ft 8 in (1.73 m)	154 lb (70 kg)	Jun 20, 2018
Andre Seldon; CB	Recruit ratings: Rivals: 247Sports: ESPN:				
Jordan Morant; S	Oradell, New Jersey	Bergen Catholic High School	6 ft 3 in (1.91 m)	225 lb (102 kg)	Jun 23, 2019
Jordan Morant; S	Recruit ratings: Rivals: 247Sports: ESPN:				
Darion Green-Warren; CB	Harbor City, California	Narbonne High School	6 ft 0 in (1.83 m)	187 lb (85 kg)	Jan 4, 2020
Darion Green-Warren; CB	Recruit ratings: Rivals: 247Sports: ESPN:				
Makari Paige; S	Bloomfield Township, Michigan	West Bloomfield High School	6 ft 3 in (1.91 m)	182 lb (83 kg)	Jul 30, 2019
Makari Paige; S	Recruit ratings: Rivals: 247Sports: ESPN:				
R. J. Moten; S	Delran, New Jersey	Delran High School	6 ft 0 in (1.83 m)	200 lb (91 kg)	Jul 27, 2019
R. J. Moten; S	Recruit ratings: Rivals: 247Sports: ESPN:				
Zak Zinter; G	Cambridge, Massachusetts	Buckingham Browne & Nichols School	6 ft 6 in (1.98 m)	300 lb (140 kg)	May 16, 2019
Zak Zinter; G	Recruit ratings: Rivals: 247Sports: ESPN:				
Jaylen Harrell; WDE	Tampa, Florida	Berkeley Prep	6 ft 4 in (1.93 m)	235 lb (107 kg)	Dec 11, 2019
Jaylen Harrell; WDE	Recruit ratings: Rivals: 247Sports: ESPN:				
Osman Savage; LB	Baltimore, Maryland	St Frances Academy	6 ft 2 in (1.88 m)	225 lb (102 kg)	Jan 25, 2019
Osman Savage; LB	Recruit ratings: Rivals: 247Sports: ESPN:				
Jeffrey Persi; OT	San Juan Capistrano, California	J Serra Catholic	6 ft 7 in (2.01 m)	265 lb (120 kg)	Jun 25, 2019
Jeffrey Persi; OT	Recruit ratings: Rivals: 247Sports: ESPN:				
Roman Wilson; WR	Honolulu, Hawaii	St Louis HS	6 ft 0 in (1.83 m)	175 lb (79 kg)	Jul 2, 2019
Roman Wilson; WR	Recruit ratings: Rivals: 247Sports: ESPN:				
Nikhai Hill-Green; LB	Baltimore, Maryland	St Frances Academy	6 ft 1 in (1.85 m)	230 lb (100 kg)	May 23, 2019
Nikhai Hill-Green; LB	Recruit ratings: Rivals: 247Sports: ESPN:				
Matthew Hibner; TE	Burke, Virginia	Lake Braddock High School	6 ft 4 in (1.93 m)	230 lb (100 kg)	Jun 9, 2019
Matthew Hibner; TE	Recruit ratings: Rivals: 247Sports: ESPN:				
Reece Atteberry; C	Aurora, Colorado	Eaglecrest High School	6 ft 5 in (1.96 m)	280 lb (130 kg)	May 24, 2019
Reece Atteberry; C	Recruit ratings: Rivals: 247Sports: ESPN:				
William Mohan; ATH	Brooklyn, New York	Erasmus Hall High School	6 ft 1 in (1.85 m)	195 lb (88 kg)	Jun 23, 2019
William Mohan; ATH	Recruit ratings: Rivals: 247Sports: ESPN:				
Cornell Wheeler; LB	West Bloomfield, Michigan	West Bloomfield High School	6 ft 1 in (1.85 m)	220 lb (100 kg)	Sep 25, 2018
Cornell Wheeler; LB	Recruit ratings: Rivals: 247Sports: ESPN:				
Eamonn Dennis; CB	Worcester, MA	St John's	5 ft 10 in (1.78 m)	173 lb (78 kg)	Jun 23, 2019
Eamonn Dennis; CB	Recruit ratings: Rivals: 247Sports: ESPN:				
Kris Jenkins Jr. DE	Olney, Maryland	Good Counsel High School	6 ft 4 in (1.93 m)	239 lb (108 kg)	Jul 3, 2019
Kris Jenkins Jr. DE	Recruit ratings: Rivals: 247Sports: ESPN:				
Dan Villari; PRO	Massapequa, New York	Plainedge High School	6 ft 4 in (1.93 m)	215 lb (98 kg)	Dec 19, 2019
Dan Villari; PRO	Recruit ratings: Rivals: 247Sports: ESPN:				
Overall recruit ranking: Rivals: 10th 247Sports: 14th ESPN: 7th
Note: In many cases, Scout, Rivals, 247Sports, On3, and ESPN may conflict in their listings of height and weight.; In these cases, the average was taken. ESPN grades are on a 100-point scale.; Sources: "2020 Michigan football commitments". Rivals.; "2020 Team Ranking". Rivals.com.; "2020 Michigan football commitments". 247Sports.

== Schedule ==
Michigan was originally scheduled to play non-conference games against Washington, Ball State, and Arkansas State; and conference games against Ohio State, Maryland, and Iowa. However those games were canceled due to the COVID-19 pandemic. The Big Ten Conference announced on July 9 that if the conference is to participate in a fall sports season, member schools will play a conference-only schedule. The Big Ten announced a revised schedule on August 5, which was scrapped when the conference announced postponement of the season on August 11. A new schedule was released on September 19.

Date	Time	Opponent	Rank	Site	TV	Result	Attendance	Source
October 24	7:30 p.m.	at No. 21 Minnesota	No. 18	TCF Bank Stadium; Minneapolis, MN (Little Brown Jug, College GameDay)	ABC	W 49–24	589	
October 31	12:00 p.m.	Michigan State	No. 13	Michigan Stadium; Ann Arbor, MI (rivalry)	Fox	L 24–27	615	
November 7	12:00 p.m.	at No. 13 Indiana	No. 23	Memorial Stadium; Bloomington, IN	FS1	L 21–38	1,034	
November 14	7:30 p.m.	No. 13 Wisconsin		Michigan Stadium; Ann Arbor, MI	ABC	L 11–49	605	
November 21	7:30 p.m.	at Rutgers		SHI Stadium; Piscataway, NJ	BTN	W 48–42 ^{3OT}	0	
November 28	12:00 p.m.	Penn State		Michigan Stadium; Ann Arbor, MI (rivalry)	ABC	L 17–27	0	
December 5	3:30 p.m.	Maryland		Michigan Stadium; Ann Arbor, MI	BTN	No contest		
December 12	12:00 p.m.	at No. 4 Ohio State		Ohio Stadium; Columbus, OH (The Game)	Fox	No contest		
December 19	7:00 p.m.	at No. 16 Iowa		Kinnick Stadium; Iowa City, IA (Champions Week)	ESPN	No contest		
Rankings from AP Poll and CFP Rankings (after November 24) released prior to game; All times are in Eastern time

== Rankings ==
Ranking movements Legend: ██ Increase in ranking ██ Decrease in ranking — = Not ranked RV = Received votes
	Week																
Poll	Pre	1	2	3	4	5	6	7	8	9	10	11	12	13	14	15	Final
AP	16	16*	—	—	23	20	19	18	13	23	RV	—	—	—	—	—	—
Coaches	15	15*	—	19	21	19	19	17	14	25	RV	—	—	—	—	—	—
CFP	Not released												—	—	—	—	Not released

== Radio ==
Radio coverage for all games was broadcast statewide on the Michigan Sports Network and on SiriusXM Satellite Radio and online via TuneIn. The radio announcers are Jim Brandstatter with play-by-play, Dan Dierdorf with color commentary, and Doug Karsch with sideline reports.

== Game summaries ==
=== At Minnesota ===
Michigan at Minnesota
(Little Brown Jug)

Team	1	2	3	4	Total
• No. 18 Wolverines	21	14	7	7	49
No. 21 Golden Gophers	10	7	7	0	24

- Date: October 24
- Location: TCF Bank Stadium
  Minneapolis, MN
- Game start: 6:44 p.m. CDT
- Elapsed time: 3:27
- Game attendance: 589
- Game weather: 30º F, cloudy, N 4 MPH
- Referee: Larry Smith
- TV announcers (ABC): Chris Fowler, Kirk Herbstreit and Maria Taylor

Scoring summary
1	12:44	MINN	Ko Kieft 14-yard pass from Tanner Morgan (Brock Walker kick)	MINN 7–0
1	12:33	MICH	Zach Charbonnet 70-yard run (Jake Moody kick)	Tied 7–7
1	7:08	MICH	Donovan Jeter 15-yard fumble return (Jake Moody kick)	MICH 14–7
1	0:37	MINN	Brock Walker 29-yard field goal	MICH 14–10
1	0:15	MICH	Ben Mason 8-yard pass from Joe Milton (Jake Moody kick)	MICH 21–10
2	9:38	MINN	Mohamed Ibrahim 16-yard run (Brock Walker kick)	MICH 21–17
2	4:48	MICH	Hassan Haskins 4-yard run (Jake Moody kick)	MICH 28–17
2	1:00	MICH	Hassan Haskins 4-yard run (Jake Moody kick)	MICH 35–17
3	9:36	MINN	Mohamed Ibrahim 5-yard run (Brock Walker kick)	MICH 35–24
3	5:20	MICH	Joe Milton 2-yard run (Jake Moody kick)	MICH 42–24
4	13:51	MICH	Chris Evans 5-yard run (Jake Moody kick)	MICH 49–24

On October 24, Michigan opened its season with a 49–24 victory over Minnesota in Minneapolis. Michigan retained the Little Brown Jug trophy in a rivalry that had not been contested since 2017.

Michigan defeated Minnesota 49–24. On Michigan's opening drive, Preston Jelen blocked Will Hart's punt and recovered the ball at Michigan's 17-yard line. On its second play from scrimmage, Minnesota scored via a 14-yard touchdown pass from Tanner Morgan to Ko Kieft. Michigan tied the score via a 70-yard touchdown run from Zach Charbonnet. The Wolverines took the lead when Donovan Jeter recovered a Tanner Morgan fumble and returned it 15-yards for a touchdown. Brock Walker narrowed the lead to 14–10 with a 29-yard field goal. Michigan extended its lead to 21–10 on an eight-yard touchdown pass from Joe Milton to Ben Mason. In the second quarter, Minnesota scored on a 16-yard touchdown run from Mohamed Ibrahim. Michigan added 14 points on two four-yard touchdown runs from Hassan Haskins, which made the score 35–17 in favor of Michigan at half-time. The teams exchanged touchdowns in the third quarter via a five-yard touchdown run from Ibrahim for Minnesota and a two-yard touchdown run from Milton for Michigan. Michigan scored the only points of the fourth quarter via a five-yard touchdown run from Chris Evans.

In his first start at quarterback, Joe Milton completed 15 of 22 passes for 225 yards and one touchdown and rushed for 52 yards on eight carries. Ronnie Bell led the Wolverines' receivers with four catches for 74 yards. Hassan Haskins led the backs with 82 rushing yards and two touchdowns on six carries.

Michigan's 49 points against Minnesota are the second-most points scored in a true road game against a ranked opponent in program history, trailing only those scored in a 54–51 loss at Northwestern in 2000. It also ties for the fifth-most points in a season-opening game in program history. Michigan's 35 points in the first half were the program's most against a ranked opponent in the AP Poll era. The game's officiating crew was entirely African American, the first in the Big Ten Conference.

=== Michigan State ===
Michigan State at No. 13 Michigan
(Paul Bunyan Trophy)

Team	1	2	3	4	Total
• Spartans	7	7	6	7	27
No. 13 Wolverines	7	3	7	7	24

- Date: October 31
- Location: Michigan Stadium
  Ann Arbor, MI
- Game start: 12:05 EDT
- Elapsed time: 3:40
- Game attendance: 615
- Game weather: Mid 40s, sunny, S 10–15 MPH
- Referee: Tom Stapleton
- TV announcers (Fox): Gus Johnson, Joel Klatt, and Jenny Taft

Scoring summary
1	10:57	MSU	Ricky White 30-yard pass from Rocky Lombardi (Matt Coghlin kick)	MSU 7–0
1	7:01	MICH	Blake Corum 8-yard run (Quinn Nordin kick)	Tied 7–7
2	9:40	MSU	Connor Heyward 2-yard pass from Rocky Lombardi (Matt Coghlin kick)	MSU 14–7
2	2:49	MICH	Quinn Nordin 23-yard field goal	MSU 14–10
3	12:26	MSU	Matt Coghlin 27-yard field goal	MSU 17–10
3	8:00	MICH	Blake Corum 1-yard run (Quinn Nordin kick)	Tied 17–17
3	4:23	MSU	Matt Coghlin 51-yard field goal	MSU 20–17
4	5:11	MSU	Connor Heyward 13-yard pass from Rocky Lombardi (Matt Coghlin kick)	MSU 27–17
4	13:51	MICH	Hassan Haskins 2-yard run (Quinn Nordin kick)	MSU 27–24

After facing Minnesota, Michigan hosted its in-state rival, the Michigan State Spartans in their home opener, facing Michigan State back-to-back at Ann Arbor for the first time since the 1967–68 seasons, in the battle for the Paul Bunyan Trophy. Last season, Michigan defeated Michigan State 44–10.

Michigan was upset by Michigan State 27–24. The teams exchanged touchdowns in the first quarter, on a 30-yard touchdown pass from Rocky Lombardi to Ricky White for Michigan State, and an eight-yard touchdown run from Blake Corum for Michigan. Michigan State regained the lead in the second quarter on a two-yard touchdown pass from Lombardi to Connor Heyward. Michigan responded with a 23-yard field goal by Quinn Nordin, which made the score 14–10 in favor of Michigan State at half-time. Michigan State extended its lead in the third quarter on a 27-yard field goal by Matt Coghlin. Michigan responded with a one-yard touchdown run from Corum to tie the game. Michigan State regained the lead with a 51-yard field goal by Coghlin. The teams exchanged touchdowns in the fourth quarter on a 13-yard touchdown pass from Lombardi to Connor for Michigan State and a two-yard touchdown run from Hassan Haskins for Michigan.

The official attendance of 615 was the smallest football crowd in Michigan Stadium history. Graduate student kicker Quinn Nordin was successful on his first field-goal attempt of the season for 23 yards in the second quarter. It was the 41st field goal of Nordin's career, which ranks fifth among Michigan's all-time leaders.

=== At Indiana ===
Michigan at Indiana

Team	1	2	3	4	Total
No. 23 Wolverines	7	0	7	7	21
• No. 13 Hoosiers	14	10	7	7	38

- Date: November 7
- Location: Memorial Stadium
  Bloomington, IN
- Game start: 12:03 EST
- Elapsed time: 3:37
- Game attendance: 1,034
- Game weather: 69º F, sunny, S 5 MPH
- Referee: Mark Klucynski
- TV announcers (FS1): Joe Davis and Brock Huard

Scoring summary
1	8:57	IND	Miles Marshall 13-yard pass from Michael Penix Jr. (Charles Campbell kick)	IND 7–0
1	4:48	MICH	Cornelius Johnson 37-yard pass from Joe Milton (Quinn Nordin kick)	Tied 7–7
1	1:41	IND	Ty Fryfogle 24-yard pass from Michael Penix Jr. (Charles Campbell kick)	IND 14–7
2	6:53	IND	Charles Campbell 52-yard field goal	IND 17–7
2	0:56	IND	Peyton Hendershot 1-yard pass from Michael Penix Jr. (Charles Campbell kick)	IND 24–7
3	9:01	MICH	Roman Wilson 13-yard pass from Joe Milton (Quinn Nordin kick)	IND 24–14
3	4:39	IND	Stevie Scott 1-yard run (Charles Campbell kick)	IND 31–14
3	13:43	MICH	Ronnie Bell 21-yard pass from Joe Milton (Quinn Nordin kick)	IND 31–21
4	8:40	MICH	Stevie Scott 2-yard run (Charles Campbell kick)	IND 38–21

Following its game against Michigan State, Michigan visited the Indiana Hoosiers. Last season, Michigan defeated Indiana 39–14.

Michigan lost to Indiana 38–21. Indiana opened the scoring in the first quarter via a 13-yard touchdown pass from Michael Penix Jr. to Miles Marshall. Michigan responded with a 37-yard touchdown pass from Joe Milton to Cornelius Johnson. Indiana re-gained the lead via a 24-yard touchdown pass from Penix to Ty Fryfogle. Indiana scored 10 points in the second quarter via a 52-yard field goal by Charles Campbell and a one-yard touchdown pass from Penix to Peyton Hendershot, which made the score 24–7 in favor of Indiana at half-time. The teams exchanged touchdowns in the third quarter via a 13-yard touchdown pass from Milton to Roman Wilson for Michigan and a one-yard touchdown run from Stevie Scott for Indiana. The teams exchanged touchdowns in the fourth quarter via a 21-yard touchdown pass from Milton to Ronnie Bell for Michigan and a two-yard touchdown run from Scott for Indiana.

Michigan's loss to Indiana snapped a 24-game series win streak for the Wolverines against the Hoosiers, this was their first loss to Indiana since 1987. With three successful PATs at Indiana, kicker Quinn Nordin moved into 12th place in all-time scoring for Michigan with 237 points.

=== Wisconsin ===
Wisconsin at Michigan

Team	1	2	3	4	Total
• No. 13 Badgers	14	14	7	14	49
Wolverines	0	0	11	0	11

- Date: November 14
- Location: Michigan Stadium
  Ann Arbor, MI
- Game start: 7:44 EST
- Elapsed time: 3:20
- Game attendance: 605
- Game weather: High 30s, rain likely, SE 10–20 MPH
- Referee: Jerry McGinn
- TV announcers (ABC): Chris Fowler, Kirk Herbstreit, and Holly Rowe

Scoring summary
1	9:28	WIS	Nakia Watson 2-yard run (Collin Larsh kick)	WIS 7–0
1	6:08	WIS	Mason Stokke 1-yard pass from Graham Mertz (Collin Larsh kick)	WIS 14–0
2	14:54	WIS	Mason Stokke 1-yard run (Collin Larsh kick)	WIS 21–0
2	10:07	WIS	Nakia Watson 2-yard run (Collin Larsh kick)	WIS 28–0
3	12:52	MICH	Quinn Nordin 46-yard field goal	WIS 28–3
3	4:45	WIS	Jake Ferguson 13-yard pass from Graham Mertz (Collin Larsh kick)	WIS 35–3
3	3:00	MICH	Mike Sainristil 23-yard pass from Cade McNamara (Cade McNamara pass to Giles Jackson)	WIS 35–11
4	9:36	WIS	Danny Davis III 4-yard run (Collin Larsh kick)	WIS 42–11
4	7:34	WIS	Jalen Berger 23-yard run (Collin Larsh kick)	WIS 49–11

After facing Indiana, Michigan hosted the Wisconsin Badgers. Last season, Michigan lost to Wisconsin 35–14.

Michigan lost to Wisconsin 49–11, their worst loss in Ann Arbor in 85 years, when they dropped a 38-0 decision to Ohio State. Wisconsin scored 14 points in the first quarter via a two-yard touchdown run from Nakia Watson and a one-yard touchdown pass from Graham Mertz to Mason Stokke. Wisconsin added 14 points in the second quarter via a one-yard touchdown run from Stokke and a 10-yard touchdown run from Watson, which made the score 28–0 in favor of Wisconsin at half-time. Michigan finally got on the board in the third quarter via a 46-yard field goal by Quinn Nordin. The teams exchanged touchdowns via a 13-yard touchdown pass from Mertz to Jake Ferguson for Wisconsin and a 23-yard touchdown pass from Cade McNamara to Mike Sainristil and a two-point conversion pass from Giles Jackson to McNamara for Michigan. Wisconsin added 14 points in the fourth quarter via a four-yard touchdown run from Danny Davis III and a 23-yard touchdown run from Jalen Berger.

Quinn Nordin's 46-yard field goal in the third quarter was his 14th career field goal at 40-yards or longer, setting a Michigan program record. With the loss to Wisconsin, Michigan had their first 1–3 start to a season since 1967.

=== At Rutgers ===
Michigan at Rutgers

Team	1	2	3	4	OT	2OT	3OT	Total
• Wolverines	0	7	14	14	0	7	6	48
Scarlet Knights	7	10	10	8	0	7	0	42

- Date: November 21
- Location: SHI Stadium
  Piscataway, NJ
- Game start: 7:40 EST
- Elapsed time: 4:24
- Game attendance: 0
- Game weather: 53º F, cloudy, N 8 MPH
- Referee: Jeff Servinski
- TV announcers (BTN): Mark Followill, James Laurinaitis, and Elise Menaker

Scoring summary
1	4:33	RUT	Johnny Langan 2-yard run (Valentino Ambrosio kick)	RUT 7–0
2	8:45	RUT	Johnny Langan 2-yard run (Valentino Ambrosio kick)	RUT 14–0
2	4:23	RUT	Valentino Ambrosio 38-yard field goal	RUT 17–0
2	3:26	MICH	Cornelius Johnson 46-yard pass from Cade McNamara (Quinn Nordin kick)	RUT 17–7
3	14:49	MICH	Giles Jackson 95-yard kickoff return (Quinn Nordin kick)	RUT 17–14
3	13:48	RUT	Bo Melton 61-yard pass from Noah Vedral (Valentino Ambrosio kick)	RUT 24–14
3	10:07	MICH	Nick Eubanks 9-yard pass from Cade McNamara (Quinn Nordin kick)	RUT 24–21
3	6:00	RUT	Valentino Ambrosio 42-yard field goal	RUT 27–21
4	13:38	MICH	Mike Sainristil 6-yard pass from Cade McNamara (Quinn Nordin kick)	MICH 28–27
4	5:07	MICH	Cornelius Johnson 9-yard pass from Cade McNamara (Quinn Nordin kick)	MICH 35–27
4	0:27	RUT	Aron Cruickshank 11-yard pass from Noah Vedral (Noah Verdal rush)	Tied 35–35
OT2	0:00	RUT	Jovani Haskins 25-yard pass from Noah Vedral (Valentino Ambrosio kick)	RUT 42–35
OT2	0:00	MICH	Cade McNamara 2-yard run (Quinn Nordin kick)	Tied 42–42
OT3	0:00	MICH	Hassan Haskins 1-yard run	MICH 48–42

After facing Wisconsin, Michigan traveled to Piscataway, New Jersey to face the Rutgers Scarlet Knights. Last season, Michigan defeated Rutgers in a blowout 52–0.

Michigan defeated Rutgers in triple overtime, 48–42. Rutgers opened the scoring in the first quarter via a three-yard touchdown run from Johnny Langan. Rutgers added 10 points in the second quarter via a one-yard touchdown run from Langan, and a 38-yard field goal by Valentino Ambrosio. Michigan finally got on the board later in the quarter via a 46-yard touchdown pass from Cade McNamara to Cornelius Johnson, which made the score 17–7 in favor of Rutgers at half-time. Michigan added 14 points in the third quarter via a 95-yard kickoff return by Giles Jackson and a nine-yard touchdown pass from McNamara to Nick Eubanks. Rutgers added 10 points via a 61-yard touchdown pass from Noah Vedral to Bo Melton and a 42-yard field goal by Ambrosio. Michigan added 14 points in the fourth quarter via a six-yard touchdown pass from McNamara to Mike Sainristil and a nine-yard touchdown pass from McNamara to Johnson, giving Michigan their first lead of the game. Rutgers responded with an 11-yard touchdown pass from Vedral to Aron Cruickshank and a Vedral two-point conversion run to tie the game and force overtime. After a scoreless first overtime period where both teams missed field goals, Rutgers scored via a 25-yard touchdown pass from Vedral to Jovani Haskins in double overtime. Michigan responded with a two-yard touchdown run from McNamara. In triple overtime, Michigan scored via a one-yard touchdown run from Hassan Haskins.

Michigan's 17-point comeback tied the third largest come-from-behind victory in program history and tied the second-biggest comeback on the road.

=== Penn State ===
Penn State at Michigan

Team	1	2	3	4	Total
• Nittany Lions	7	10	3	7	27
Wolverines	7	0	3	7	17

- Date: November 28
- Location: Michigan Stadium
  Ann Arbor, MI
- Game start: 12:06 EST
- Elapsed time: 3:15
- Game attendance: 0
- Game weather: Mid 40s, sunny, SW 5–10 MPH
- Referee: Larry Smith
- TV announcers (ABC): Dave Pasch and Mike Golic

Scoring summary
1	10:50	PSU	Keyvone Lee 6-yard run (Jake Pinegar kick)	PSU 7–0
1	0:30	MICH	Hassan Haskins 2-yard run (Jake Moody kick)	Tied 7–7
2	3:32	PSU	Sean Clifford 28-yard run (Jake Pinegar kick)	PSU 14–7
2	0:15	PSU	Jake Pinegar 22-yard field goal	PSU 17–7
3	9:10	MICH	Jake Moody 40-yard field goal	PSU 17–10
3	0:40	PSU	Jake Pinegar 33-yard field goal	PSU 20–10
4	13:12	MICH	Hassan Haskins 2-yard run (Jake Moody kick)	PSU 20–17
4	8:12	PSU	Will Levis 2-yard run (Jake Pinegar kick)	PSU 27–17

After facing Rutgers, Michigan hosted the Penn State Nittany Lions. Last season, Michigan lost to Penn State 21–28 in Penn State's annual White Out game.

Michigan lost to Penn State 27–17. Penn State opened the scoring in the first quarter via a six-yard touchdown run from Keyvone Lee. Michigan responded with a two-yard touchdown run from Hassan Haskins. Penn State scored 10 points in the second quarter via a 28-yard touchdown run from Sean Clifford and a 22-yard field goal by Jake Pinegar, which made the score 17–7 in favor of Penn State at half-time. The teams exchanged field goals in the third quarter, via a 40-yard field goal by Jake Moody for Michigan and a 33-yard field goal by Jake Pinegar for Penn State. The teams exchanged touchdowns in the fourth quarter, via a two-yard touchdown run from Haskins for Michigan and a two-yard touchdown run from Will Levis for Penn State.

With the rest of their season cancelled, the loss to Penn State meant Michigan won no games at home for the first time in program history; the Wolverines played their first game in Ann Arbor in 1883.

== Roster ==
2020 Michigan Wolverines football team roster
Players
Coaches
Offense

Pos.	#	Name	Class
WR	0	Giles Jackson	So
RB	2	Blake Corum	Fr
WR	3	A. J. Henning	Fr
QB	4	Dan Villari	Fr
QB	5	Joe Milton	Jr
WR	6	Cornelius Johnson	So
QB	7	Peyton Smith	Fr
WR	8	Ronnie Bell	Jr
RB	9	Chris Evans	Sr
QB	12	Cade McNamara	So
WR	13	Eamonn Dennis	Fr
WR	14	Roman Wilson	Fr
QB	15	Andy Maddox	So
QB	16	Ren Hefley	So
QB	18	Max Wittwer	Jr
WR	19	Mike Sainristil	So
RB	20	Nicholas Capatina	Sr
RB	22	Danny Hughes	So
RB	23	Gaige Garcia	Fr
RB	24	Zach Charbonnet	So
RB	25	Hassan Haskins	Jr
WR	27	Christian Bartholomew	Fr
RB	28	Christian Turner	Jr
WR	30	Will Rolapp	Fr
RB	31	Lucas Andrighetto	Jr
RB	34	Leon Franklin	So
TE	35	Luke Buckman	Jr
RB	36	Nico Tiberia	Fr
WR	39	Matt Torey	Jr
RB	41	Isaiah Gash	Fr
FB	42	Ben Mason (C)	Sr
WR	43	Jake McCurry	Sr
FB	46	Matt Brown	Sr
G	52	Karsen Barnhart	So
OT	53	Trente Jones	So
C	54	Kraig Correll	Jr
C	55	Nolan Rumler	So
C	58	Zach Carpenter	So
G	59	Joel Honigford	Sr
OL	60	Luke Fisher	So
OL	61	Noah Stewart	Fr
OL	62	Mica Gelb	So
OT	65	Zak Zinter	Fr
G	66	Chuck Filiaga	Sr
C	68	Andrew Vastardis (C)	Sr
G	70	Jack Stewart	So
OT	71	Andrew Stueber	Sr
OT	73	Jalen Mayfield	So
C	74	Reece Atteberry	Fr
OT	76	Ryan Hayes	Jr
OT	77	Trevor Keegan	So
OT	78	Griffin Korican	Jr
OT	79	Jeffrey Persi	Fr
WR	80	Hunter Neff	So
TE	81	Will Sessa	So
WR	81	Nate Schoenle	Sr
TE	82	Nick Eubanks (C)	Sr
TE	83	Erick All	So
WR	84	Sam Staruch	Fr
TE	86	Luke Schoonmaker	Jr
TE	88	Matthew Hibner	Fr
WR	88	Matthew Harrison	So
TE	89	Carter Selzer	Sr

Defense

Pos.	#	Name	Class
CB	0	Andre Seldon	Fr
DT	2	Carlo Kemp (C)	Sr
CB	4	Vincent Gray	Jr
CB	5	D. J. Turner	So
S	6	R. J. Moten	Fr
S	7	Makari Paige	Fr
LB	8	William Mohan	Fr
CB	9	Sammy Faustin	Jr
LB	10	Anthony Solomon	So
LB	12	Josh Ross (C)	Sr
S	14	Quinten Johnson	So
DT	15	Christopher Hinton	So
CB	16	Jalen Perry	So
DE	17	Braiden McGregor	Fr
DE	18	Luiji Vilain	Sr
DE	19	Kwity Paye (C)	Sr
S	20	Brad Hawkins	Sr
CB	22	Gemon Green	Jr
LB	23	Michael Barrett	Jr
CB	24	George Johnson	So
LB	25	Cornell Wheeler	Fr
DB	26	Jake Thaw	Fr
LB	26	Kalel Mullings	Fr
S	27	Hunter Reynolds	Sr
CB	28	Darion Green-Warren	Fr
DB	29	Jared Davis	Sr
S	29	Joey Velazquez	So
S	30	Daxton Hill	So
S	31	Jordan Morant	Fr
LB	32	Nolan Knight	So
DE	32	Jaylen Harrell	Fr
S	33	German Green	Jr
S	35	Caden Kolesar	So
LB	37	Edward Warinner	Jr
LB	37	Jonathan Lampani	Sr
LB	38	Geoffrey Reeves	Sr
LB	40	Ben VanSumeren	Jr
LB	40	Ryan Nelson	Sr
LB	41	Nikhai Hill-Green	Fr
DB	42	John Baty	Sr
DB	44	Joshua Luther	So
LB	44	Cameron McGrone	Jr
LB	45	Adam Shibley	Sr
CB	49	Keshaun Harris	So
LB	50	Jerome Nichols	Fr
LB	54	Adam Fakih	Sr
DE	55	David Ojabo	So
DL	57	Joey George	Jr
DT	58	Mazi Smith	So
DT	67	Jess Speight	Sr
DL	72	Elijah Pierre	Sr
DE	90	Mike Morris	So
DE	91	Taylor Upshaw	Jr
DT	92	Phillip Paea	Sr
DE	94	Kris Jenkins Jr.	Fr
DT	95	Donovan Jeter	Sr
DT	96	Julius Welschof	Jr
DE	97	Aidan Hutchinson (C)	Jr
DE	99	Gabe Newburg	So

Special teams

Pos.	#	Name	Class
K	3	Quinn Nordin	Sr
K	13	Jake Moody	Jr
P	17	Will Hart	Sr
LS	45	Greg Tarr	Fr
LS	49	William Wagner	So
P	91	Brad Robbins	Sr
K/P	92	Karl Kerska	So
K	93	Cole Hussung	Fr
P	94	Izaak Gerkis	Sr

Head coach

- Jim Harbaugh

Coordinators/assistant coaches

- Don Brown (defensive coordinator / linebackers)
- Josh Gattis (offensive coordinator)
- Jay Harbaugh (running backs / special teams coordinator)
- Brian Jean-Mary (linebackers)
- Ben McDaniels (quarterbacks)
- Sherrone Moore (tight ends)
- Shaun Nua (defensive line)
- Bob Shoop (safeties)
- Ed Warinner (offensive line)
- Mike Zordich (cornerbacks)
- Grant Newsome (graduate assistant)

Legend

- (C) Team captain
- (S) Suspended
- (I) Ineligible
- Injured
- Redshirt

Roster
Last update: October 20, 2020

== Awards and honors ==
Weekly awards
Player	Award	Date awarded	Ref.
Giles Jackson	Big Ten Special Teams Player of the Week	November 23, 2020	

All-Big Ten
Player	Position	Coaches	Media
Giles Jackson	KR	3	2
Kwity Paye	DL	Hon.	2
Hassan Haskins	RB	Hon.	Hon.
Daxton Hill	DB	Hon.	Hon.
Brad Robbins	P	Hon.	Hon.
Carlo Kemp	DL	Hon.	–
Andrew Stueber	OT	Hon.	–
Michael Barrett	LB	–	Hon.
Brad Hawkins	DB	–	Hon.
Hon. = Honorable mention. Reference:

== 2021 NFL draft ==
Round	Pick	Player	Position	NFL team
1	21	Kwity Paye	DE	Indianapolis Colts
3	68	Jalen Mayfield	OT	Atlanta Falcons
3	89	Nico Collins	WR	Houston Texans
3	102	Ambry Thomas	CB	San Francisco 49ers
5	177	Cameron McGrone	ILB	New England Patriots
5	184	Ben Mason	FB	Baltimore Ravens
6	202	Chris Evans	RB	Cincinnati Bengals
6	225	Camaron Cheeseman	LS	Washington Football Team
