= Kwity Paye =

Liberian gridiron football player (born 1998)

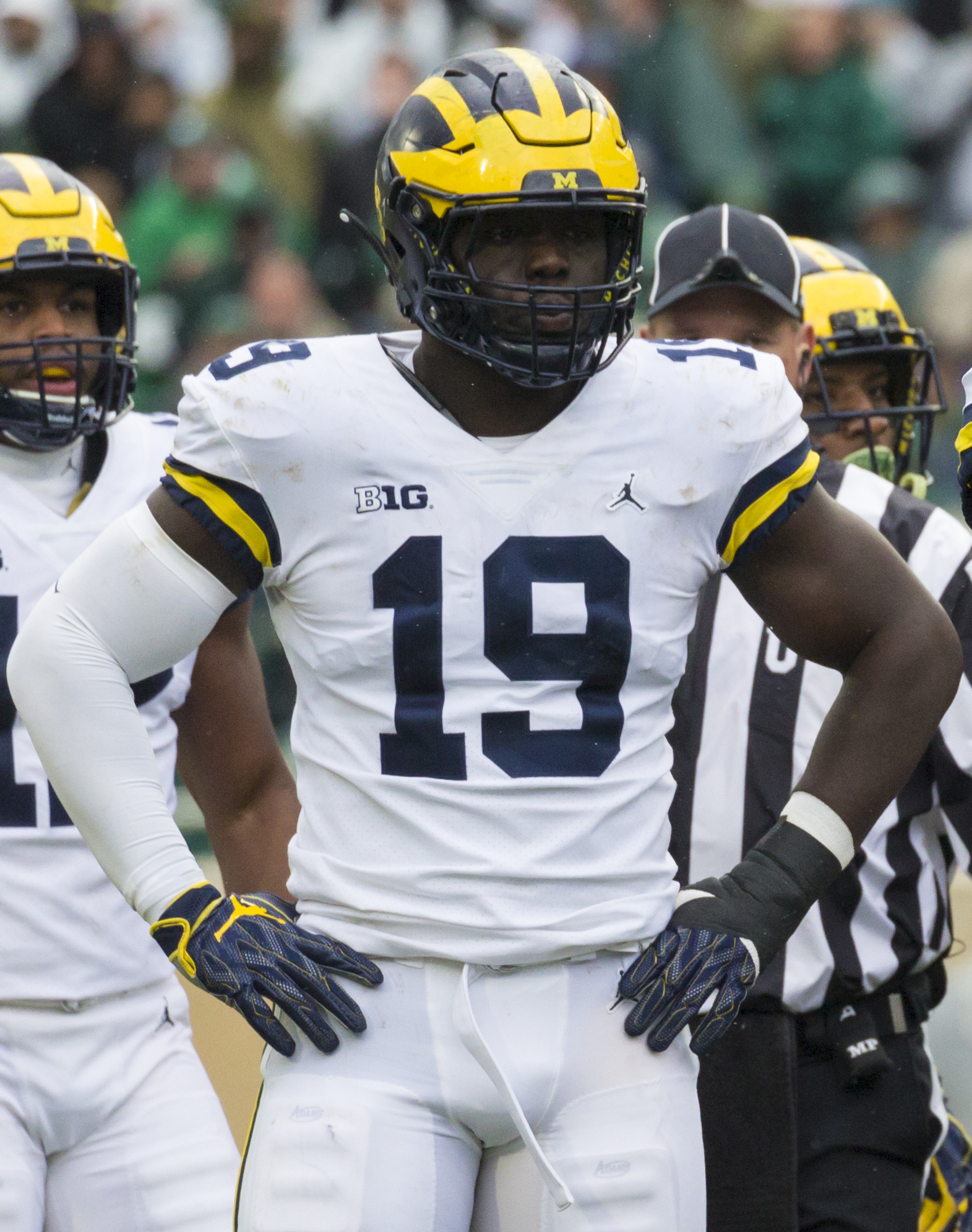
- Paye with the Michigan Wolverines in 2018

No. 95 – Las Vegas Raiders
- Position: Defensive end
- Roster status: Active

Personal information
- Born: 19 November 1998 (age 27); Guinea
- Listed height: 6 ft 3 in (1.91 m)
- Listed weight: 265 lb (120 kg)

Career information
- High school: Bishop Hendricken (Warwick, Rhode Island, U.S.)
- College: Michigan (2017–2020)
- NFL draft: 2021: 1st round, 21st overall pick

Career history
- Indianapolis Colts (2021–2025); Las Vegas Raiders (2026–present)

Awards and highlights
- PFWA All-Rookie Team (2021); 2× Second-team All-Big Ten (2019, 2020)

Career NFL statistics as of Week 10, 2025
- Total tackles: 235
- Sacks: 33.5
- Forced fumbles: 4
- Fumble recoveries: 5
- Pass deflections: 3
- Stats at Pro Football Reference

Kwity Paye (/ˈkwɪti ˈpeɪ/ KWIT-ee PAY; born 19 November 1998) is a Liberian professional American football defensive end for the Las Vegas Raiders of the National Football League (NFL). He was born in Guinea as a refugee of the First Liberian Civil War and immigrated to the United States as a baby. Paye played college football for the Michigan Wolverines and was selected by the Indianapolis Colts in the first round of the 2021 NFL draft.

== Early life ==
Paye was born on 19 November 1998, to a Liberian Krahn mother in a refugee camp in Guinea in the aftermath of the First Liberian Civil War. His mother named him Kwity after his maternal grandfather, who was killed during the war, and brought him and his brother Komotay to Providence, Rhode Island in the United States when he was six months old.

He and his brother found an affinity for American football growing up there, with Kwity later attending Bishop Hendricken High School in Warwick, Rhode Island. Playing running back and defensive end, he was named Rhode Island's Gatorade Football Player of the Year as a senior in 2016. Paye originally committed to play college football at Boston College, but later switched to the University of Michigan.

== College career ==
As a true freshman at Michigan in 2017, Paye played in nine games and had five tackles and one sack. As a sophomore in 2018, he started four games and recorded 29 tackles and two sacks. As a junior he started 11 games and finished with 50 tackles and 6.5 sacks. Paye returned to Michigan for his senior year in 2020 but only played in four games due to the season being affected by the COVID-19 pandemic.

== Professional career ==
Pre-draft measurables
Height	Weight	Arm length	Hand span	Wingspan	40-yard dash	10-yard split	20-yard split	Three-cone drill	Vertical jump	Broad jump	Bench press
6 ft 2 1/2 in (1.89 m)	261 lb (118 kg)	33 in (0.84 m)	10 in (0.25 m)	6 ft 6 1/2 in (1.99 m)	4.52 s	1.66 s	2.59 s	6.37 s	35.5 in (0.90 m)	9 ft 10 in (3.00 m)	36 reps
All values from Michigan's Pro Day

=== Indianapolis Colts ===
Paye was selected by the Indianapolis Colts in the first round (21st overall) of the 2021 NFL draft. He signed his four-year rookie contract on 6 May 2021. In his rookie season, he finished with four sacks, 32 total tackles (16 solo), one pass defended, and one forced fumble. He was named to the PFWA All-Rookie Team.

In the 2022 season, Paye appeared in 13 games. He finished with six sacks and 45 total tackles (32 solo).

In 2023, Paye started 16 games, recording 52 tackles and finished second on the team with 8.5 sacks.

In 2024, the Colts exercised the fifth-year option on Paye's rookie contract, extending him through the 2025 season.

=== Las Vegas Raiders ===
On March 12, 2026, the Las Vegas Raiders signed Paye to a three-year $48 million contract with $31.28 million guaranteed including a $10 million signing bonus.

== Career statistics ==
=== NFL ===
Legend
**Bold**	Career high

Year	Team	Games		Tackles					Interceptions						Fumbles				
Year	Team	GP	GS	Cmb	Solo	Ast	Sck	TFL	Int	Yds	Avg	Lng	TD	PD	FF	Fmb	FR	Yds	TD
2021	IND	15	15	32	16	16	4.0	3	0	0	0.0	0	0	**1**	1	0	**2**	**0**	0
2022	IND	12	12	**45**	**32**	13	6.0	**10**	0	0	0.0	0	0	0	0	0	1	**0**	0
2023	IND	16	16	52	31	21	**8.5**	8	0	0	0.0	0	0	0	**2**	0	**2**	-5	0
2024	IND	15	15	41	29	12	8.0	**10**	0	0	0.0	0	0	**1**	1	0	0	0	0
2025	IND	17	16	39	15	**24**	4.0	6	0	0	0.0	0	0	**1**	0	0	0	0	0
2026	LVR	10	8	26	8	18	3.0	3	0	0	0.0	0	0	0	0	0	0	0	0
Career		85	82	235	131	104	33.5	40	0	0	0.0	0	0	3	4	0	5	-5	0

=== College ===
Year	GP	Tackles					Fumbles	
Year	GP	Solo	Ast	Total	Loss	Sack	FR	FF
2017	2	0	4	4	1.5	1	0	0
2018	10	21	6	27	5.5	2	0	1
2019	12	26	24	50	12.5	6.5	0	0
2020	4	12	4	16	4	2	0	0
Career	28	59	38	97	23.5	11.5	0	1
