= Aidan Hutchinson =

American football player (born 2000)

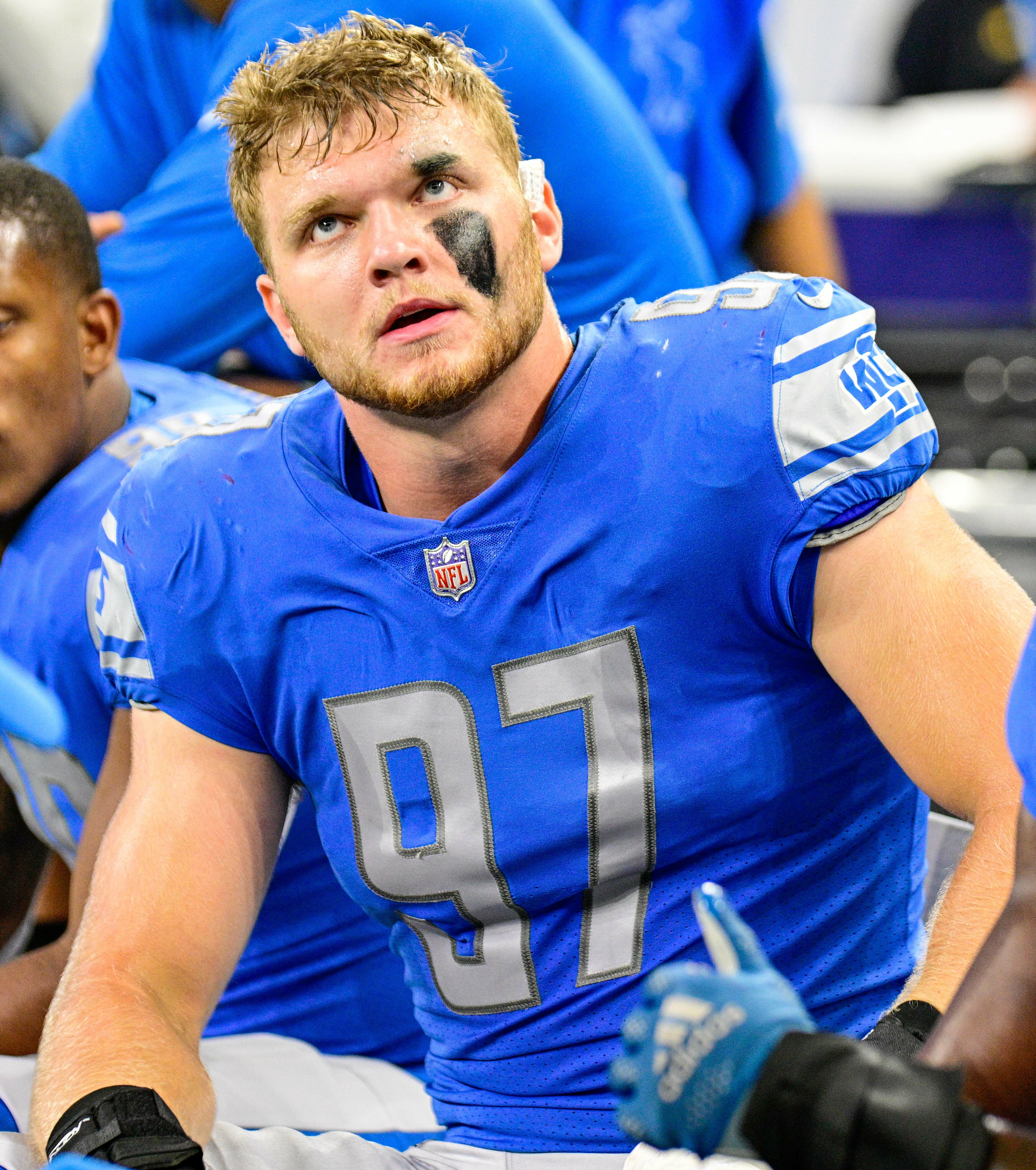
- Hutchinson with the Detroit Lions in 2022

No. 97 – Detroit Lions
- Position: Defensive end
- Roster status: Injured reserve

Personal information
- Born: August 9, 2000 (age 26); Plymouth, Michigan, U.S.
- Listed height: 6 ft 7 in (2.01 m)
- Listed weight: 268 lb (122 kg)

Career information
- High school: Divine Child (Dearborn, Michigan)
- College: Michigan (2018–2021)
- NFL draft: 2022: 1st round, 2nd overall pick

Career history
- Detroit Lions (2022–present)

Awards and highlights
- Second-team All-Pro (2025); 2× Pro Bowl (2023, 2025); PFWA All-Rookie Team (2022); Ted Hendricks Award (2021); Lombardi Award (2021); Lott Trophy (2021); Unanimous All-American (2021); Big Ten Most Valuable Player (2021); Big Ten Defensive Player of the Year (2021); Big Ten Defensive Lineman of the Year (2021); First-team All-Big Ten (2021); Third-team All-Big Ten (2019); Big Ten Championship Game MVP (2021)

Career NFL statistics as of 2026
- Total tackles: 200
- Sacks: 49
- Forced fumbles: 9
- Fumble recoveries: 5
- Pass deflections: 14
- Interceptions: 5
- Stats at Pro Football Reference

Aidan Joseph Bernardi Hutchinson (born August 9, 2000) is an American professional football defensive end for the Detroit Lions of the National Football League (NFL). He was a unanimous All-American playing college football for the Michigan Wolverines, and the runner-up for the Heisman Trophy in 2021. Hutchinson was selected with the second overall pick by the Lions in the first round of the 2022 NFL draft, and named to the All-Rookie Team. He was selected to the Pro Bowl in 2023 and 2025, and made his first All-Pro with a second-team selection in 2025.

== Early life ==
Hutchinson was born on August 9, 2000, in Plymouth, Michigan. He attended Divine Child High School in Dearborn, Michigan, where he played defensive end, tight end, offensive line, and long snapper. He played in the 2018 U.S. Army All-American Game and had two sacks. Hutchinson committed to play college football at the University of Michigan.

== College career ==
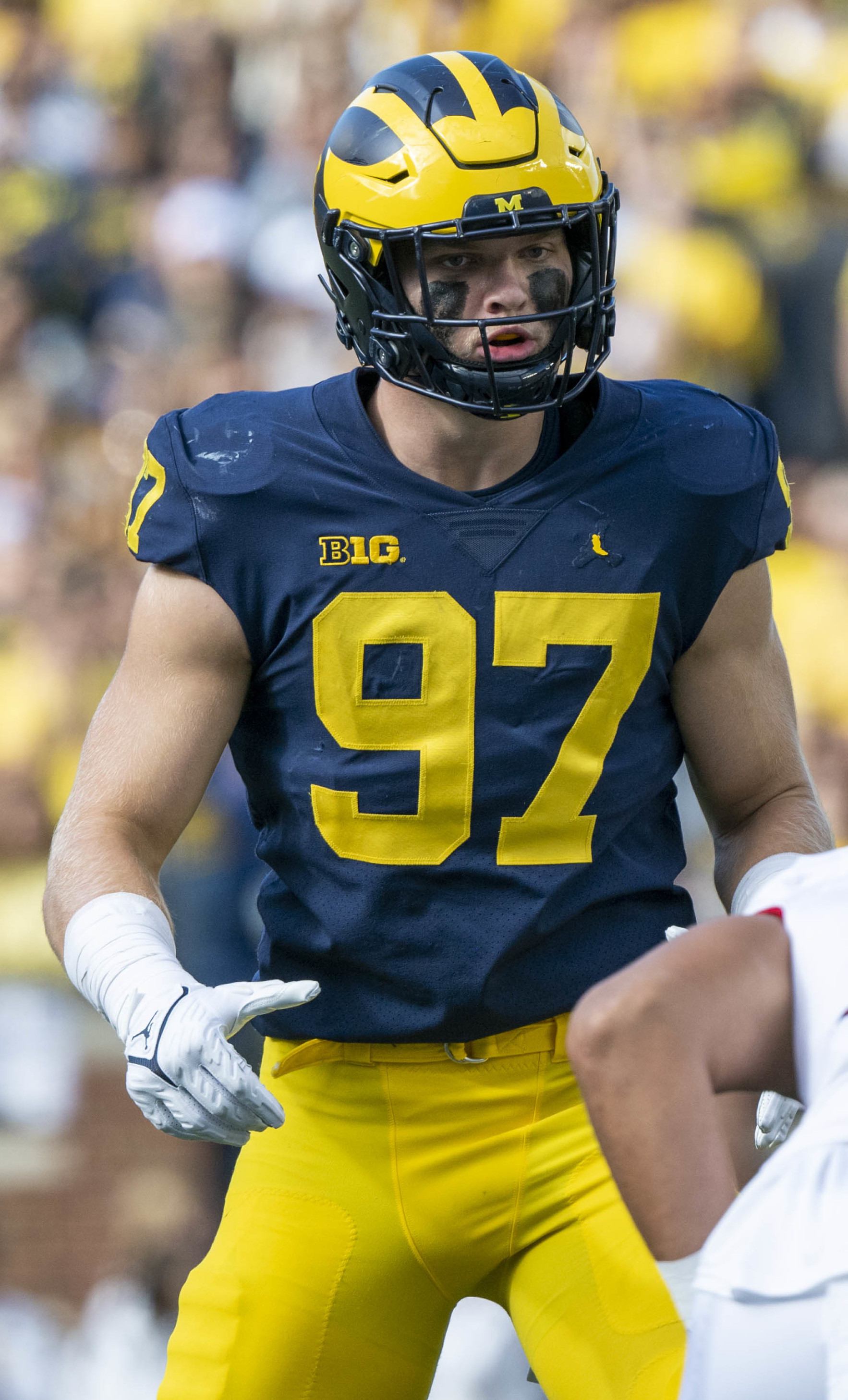
Hutchinson with the Michigan Wolverines in 2021

As a true freshman at Michigan in 2018, Hutchinson played in all 13 games and had 15 tackles. As a sophomore in 2019, he started all 13 games, recording 68 tackles and 4.5 sacks. As a junior in 2020, he started the first three games until he had a season-ending injury.

As a senior in 2021, Hutchinson set the team's single-season sack record at 14. He won several awards for his efforts, including the Ted Hendricks Award, Lombardi Award, Lott IMPACT Trophy, and the Chicago Tribune Silver Football. He was also the runner-up for the Heisman Trophy, the only defensive player among three quarterbacks to be named a finalist. Following the season, Hutchinson declared for the 2022 NFL draft.

== Professional career ==
Pre-draft measurables
| Height | Weight | Arm length | Hand span | Wingspan | 40-yard dash | 10-yard split | 20-yard split | 20-yard shuttle | Three-cone drill | Vertical jump | Broad jump | Bench press | Wonderlic |
|---|---|---|---|---|---|---|---|---|---|---|---|---|---|
| 6 ft 6 5/8 in (2.00 m) | 260 lb (118 kg) | 32 1/8 in (0.82 m) | 10 1/4 in (0.26 m) | 6 ft 6 1/8 in (1.98 m) | 4.74 s | 1.62 s | 2.74 s | 4.15 s | 6.73 s | 36.0 in (0.91 m) | 9 ft 9 in (2.97 m) | 28 reps | 23 |
All values from NFL Combine/Pro Day

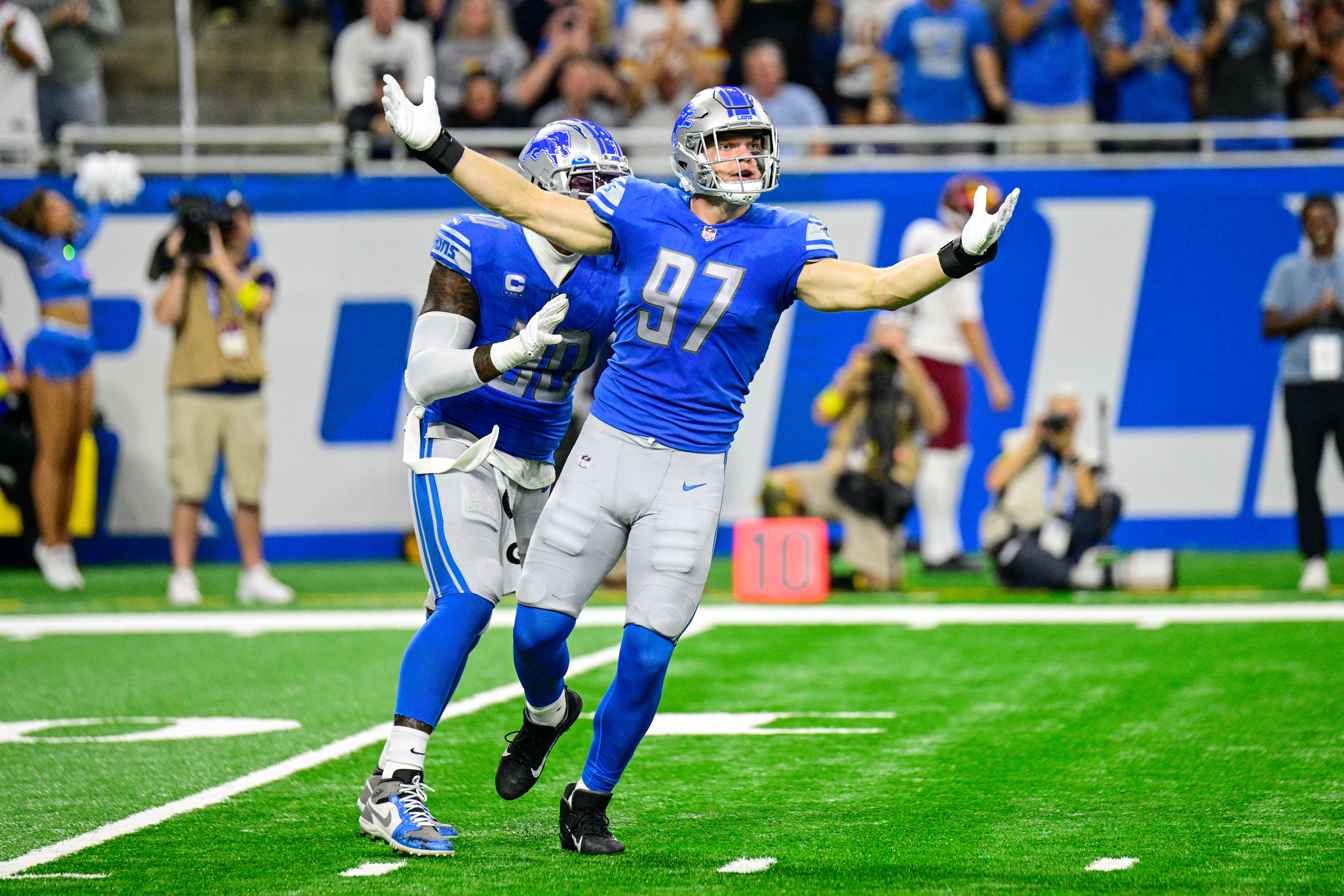
Hutchinson in 2022

=== 2022 ===
Hutchinson was selected in the first round with the second overall pick by the Detroit Lions in the 2022 NFL draft. He signed his four-year contract, worth $35.7 million fully guaranteed, on May 9, 2022.

Hutchinson recorded three sacks, a Lions rookie record, in week 2 against the Washington Commanders. He recorded his first career interception against Aaron Rodgers in a 15–9 victory over the Green Bay Packers on November 6, 2022, with a second interception against Daniel Jones in a win over the New York Giants two weeks later. He finished his rookie season with 9.5 sacks, 52 total tackles (34 solo), three interceptions, three passes defensed, and two fumble recoveries. He was named to the Pro Football Writers of America All-Rookie Team.

=== 2023 ===
In week 3, Hutchinson recorded four tackles, two sacks, two passes defensed, a forced fumble and a recovery in a 20–6 win over the Atlanta Falcons, earning National Football Conference (NFC) Defensive Player of the Week. In week 17, Hutchinson recorded three sacks against the Dallas Cowboys, marking his second consecutive season with a three-sack game. Hutchinson finished the season with 11.5 sacks, 51 total tackles, an interception, three forced fumbles, and two fumble recoveries. He was selected to his first Pro Bowl. He was ranked 47th by his fellow players on the NFL Top 100 Players of 2024.

=== 2024 ===
Hutchinson was named NFC Defensive Player of the Month for September. On October 13, 2024, against the Dallas Cowboys in week 6, Hutchinson suffered a severe leg injury in the third quarter, fracturing both his tibia and fibula. He underwent immediate surgery, with head coach Dan Campbell estimating a recovery timetable of "four to six months." Prior to the injury, Hutchinson had recorded a league-leading 7.5 sacks and 19 total tackles in five games. He was ranked 55th by his fellow players on the NFL Top 100 Players of 2025.

=== 2025 ===
The Lions picked up the fifth-year option on Hutchinson's contract; Hutchinson was set to earn nearly $20 million for the 2025 season. On October 29, 2025, the Lions and Hutchinson agreed to a four-year contract extension for $180 million over four years, with $141 million in total guaranteed money. The contract set a new record for highest guaranteed money among non-quarterback players. He finished the 2025 season with 14.5 sacks, 54 total tackles (36 solo), one interception, three passes defended, four forced fumbles, and one fumble recovery. He earned Pro Bowl honors for the second time in his career.

=== 2026 ===
Hutchinson opened the season strong with a two-sack performance in the 31–30 overtime victory against the New Orleans Saints. He also recorded five combined tackles and four quarterback hits in that game. The next week, he had a strip sack on Josh Allen during the 41–31 loss against the Buffalo Bills. In that game, he set a franchise record by producing a sack in six consecutive games.

During a Week 10 game against the New England Patriots in Munich, Hutchinson suffered a knee injury while celebrating a sack on Drake Maye in the first quarter. Two days later, it was announced he would be out for the rest of the season with a torn ACL in his right knee. He finished the season with 24 combined tackles, 6.0 sacks, a forced fumble, and a pass defensed.

== Career statistics ==
Legend
| | Led the league |
| **Bold** | Career high |

=== NFL ===
==== Regular season ====
| Year | Team | Games | | Tackles | | | | | | Interceptions | | | | | Fumbles | | | |
| Year | Team | GP | GS | Cmb | Solo | Ast | TFL | QBH | Sck | PD | Int | Yds | Lng | TD | FF | FR | Yds | TD |
|---|---|---|---|---|---|---|---|---|---|---|---|---|---|---|---|---|---|---|
| 2022 | DET | 17 | 17 | 52 | 34 | **18** | 9 | 15 | 9.5 | 3 | **3** | 25 | 20 | 0 | 0 | **2** | 0 | 0 |
| 2023 | DET | 17 | 17 | 51 | **36** | 15 | **14** | 33 | 11.5 | **7** | 1 | 6 | 6 | 0 | 3 | **2** | 0 | 0 |
| 2024 | DET | 5 | 5 | 19 | 12 | 7 | 7 | 17 | 7.5 | 0 | 0 | 0 | 0 | 0 | 1 | 0 | 0 | 0 |
| 2025 | DET | 17 | 17 | **54** | **36** | **18** | **14** | **35** | **14.5** | 3 | 1 | **58** | **58** | 0 | **4** | 1 | 0 | 0 |
| 2026 | DET | 9 | 9 | 24 | 15 | 9 | 6 | 19 | 6.0 | 1 | 0 | 0 | 0 | 0 | 1 | 0 | 0 | 0 |
| Career | | 65 | 65 | 200 | 133 | 67 | 50 | 119 | 49.0 | 14 | 5 | 89 | 58 | 0 | 9 | 5 | 0 | 0 |

==== Postseason ====
| Year | Team | Games | | Tackles | | | | | | Interceptions | | | | | Fumbles | | | |
| Year | Team | GP | GS | Cmb | Solo | Ast | TFL | QBH | Sck | PD | Int | Yds | Lng | TD | FF | FR | Yds | TD |
|---|---|---|---|---|---|---|---|---|---|---|---|---|---|---|---|---|---|---|
| 2023 | DET | 3 | 3 | 10 | 8 | 2 | 3 | 8 | 3.0 | 2 | 0 | 0 | 0 | 0 | 0 | 0 | 0 | 0 |
| Career | | 3 | 3 | 10 | 8 | 2 | 3 | 8 | 3.0 | 2 | 0 | 0 | 0 | 0 | 0 | 0 | 0 | 0 |

=== College ===
College statistics
| Season | Team | GP | Tackles | | | | | Interceptions | | | | | Fumbles | | | |
| Season | Team | GP | Solo | Ast | Cmb | TfL | Sck | Int | Yds | Avg | TD | PD | FR | Yds | TD | FF |
|---|---|---|---|---|---|---|---|---|---|---|---|---|---|---|---|---|
| 2018 | Michigan | 13 | 5 | 10 | 15 | 1.5 | 0.0 | 0 | 0 | 0.0 | 0 | 0 | 0 | 0 | 0 | 0 |
| 2019 | Michigan | 13 | **34** | **34** | **68** | 10 | 4.5 | 0 | 0 | 0.0 | 0 | **6** | 0 | 0 | 0 | **2** |
| 2020 | Michigan | 3 | 9 | 6 | 13 | 0 | 0.0 | 0 | 0 | 0.0 | 0 | 1 | 0 | 0 | 0 | 0 |
| 2021 | Michigan | 14 | 33 | 22 | 55 | **15** | **14.0** | 0 | 0 | 0.0 | 0 | 3 | 0 | 0 | 0 | **2** |
| Career | | 43 | 81 | 72 | 153 | 26.5 | 18.5 | 0 | 0 | 0.0 | 0 | 10 | 0 | 0 | 0 | 4 |

== Awards ==
- 2× Pro Bowl (2023, 2025)
- Pepsi NFL Rookie of the Year (2022)
- 2× NFC Defensive Player of the Week – 2022 (week 11), 2023 (week 3)
- 2× NFC Defensive Rookie of the Month – November 2022, December 2022–January 2023
- Ranked No. 88 in the Top 100 Players of 2023
- Ranked No. 47 in the Top 100 Players of 2024
- Ranked No. 55 in the Top 100 Players of 2025
- Ranked No. 30 in the Top 100 Players of 2026

== Personal life ==
His father, Chris Hutchinson, also played college football at Michigan. His mother, Melissa Sinkevics, won the 1988 Miss Michigan Teen USA event while his older sister, Aria, won Miss Michigan USA 2022.

Hutchinson's great-grandfather, Giuseppe "Joseph" Bernardi, came from the town of Medeglia in Switzerland. Hutchinson wears a Swiss flag on his helmet, immediately to the left of the American flag.
