= Red Joseph =

American football player (1905–1983)

Profile
- Position: End

Personal information
- Born: November 7, 1905; Hemlock, Ohio, U.S.
- Died: September 17, 1983 (aged 77); Harlingen, Texas, U.S.
- Listed height: 6 ft 3 in (1.91 m)
- Listed weight: 190 lb (86 kg)

Career information
- High school: East (OH)
- College: Ohio State

Career history
- Ashland Armcos (1926); Dayton Triangles (1927); Portsmouth Shoe-Steels (1927); Portsmouth Spartans (1929–1930); Cleveland Indians (1931)
- Stats at Pro Football Reference

Chalmer Edward "Red" Joseph (November 7, 1905 – September 17, 1983) was an American football player.

Joseph was born in 1904 in Hemlock, Ohio, and attended East High School in Columbus, Ohio. His older brother Zern Joseph played football for Miami (Ohio) and the Dayton Triangles.

Red Joseph attended Ohio State University where he won a freshman letter in football in 1924. He also played football for Ohio State in 1925.

Joseph began playing professional football in 1926 as an end for the Ashland Armcos. The press credited Joseph with performing "in excellent style" and being "one of the stars" for Ashland.

In 1927, he played for the Dayton Triangles of the National Football League (NFL). He started all eight games at right end for the Triangles during their 1927 season. Joseph also played for the Portsmouth Shoe-Steels during the 1927 season, where he was credited with being on his toes every minute, with vicious tackling, and with speed to run down the field with such speed that he was there when opposing players could catch punts.

In 1929 he played at right end for the Portsmouth Spartans. He remained with the Spartans in 1930 when the club joined the NFL. He appeared in 12 games, seven as a starter, for the 1930 Portsmouth club.

In 1931, Joseph joined the Cleveland Indians of the NFL. He appeared in only one game for the Indians. In three seasons, Joseph appeared in 21 NFL games, 15 as a starter.

Joseph died in 1983 in Harlingen, Texas.
