= Don Jackson (American football, born 1913) =

No. 10
- Position: Halfback

Personal information
- Born: November 14, 1913
- Died: August 25, 1946 (aged 32); Dallas, Texas, U.S.
- Listed height: 5 ft 11 in (1.80 m)
- Listed weight: 178 lb (81 kg)

Career information
- High school: Seminole (Seminole County, Florida)
- College: North Carolina (1932–1935)
- NFL draft: 1936: undrafted

Career history
- Philadelphia Eagles (1936)

Donald Fletcher Jackson (November 14, 1913 – August 25, 1946) was an American professional football halfback. He played college football for the North Carolina Tar Heels. After college, he played one season in the National Football League (NFL) for the Philadelphia Eagles.
