= Hoss Johnson =

American football player (born 1963)

No. 73
- Position: Offensive tackle

Personal information
- Born: June 8, 1963 (age 63); Huntsville, Alabama, U.S.
- Listed height: 6 ft 4 in (1.93 m)
- Listed weight: 295 lb (134 kg)

Career information
- High school: S. R. Butler (Huntsville)
- College: Alabama (1982–1986)
- NFL draft: 1987: undrafted

Career history
- St. Louis Cardinals (1987)*; Tampa Bay Buccaneers (1987)
- * Offseason or practice squad member only
- Stats at Pro Football Reference

David G. "Hoss" Johnson (born June 8, 1963) is an American former professional football offensive tackle who played for the Tampa Bay Buccaneers of the National Football League (NFL). He played college football for the Alabama Crimson Tide.

== Early life ==
David G. Johnson was born on June 8, 1963, in Huntsville, Alabama. He played high school football and basketball at S. R. Butler High School in Huntsville.

== College career ==
Johnson was highly recruited out of school. He narrowed his choices down to the University of Alabama and Liberty Baptist College, which he considered attending due to his religious background. In March 1982, he chose to play college football for the Alabama Crimson Tide. Johnson redshirted the 1982 season on the scout team and was a non-lettering special teams player in 1983. He was a three-year letterman from 1984 to 1986 and started 28 games. In early August 1986, he had 19 stitches after cutting his foot in a swimming pool.

== Professional career ==
Johnson signed with the St. Louis Cardinals in 1987. He was released on August 17 after the first game of the 1987 preseason.

On September 22, Johnson signed with the Tampa Bay Buccaneers during the 1987 NFL players strike. He played in one game for the Buccaneers as a reserve offensive tackle. He was released on October 19, 1987, after the strike ended.

== Personal life ==
Johnson was inducted into the Huntsville-Madison County Athletic Hall of Fame in 1997. He worked for the Huntsville Parks & Recreation Department from 1988 to 2013. He has done football mission trips in Costa Rica, Israel, Panama, and Turkey.
