= Zern Joseph =

American football player and automobile executive (1903–1977)

- Zern Joseph, 1924

Profile
- Positions: End, guard, center

Personal information
- Born: May 31, 1903; Hemlock, Ohio, U.S.
- Died: November 24, 1977 (aged 74); San Diego County, California, U.S.
- Listed height: 6 ft 2 in (1.88 m)
- Listed weight: 170 lb (77 kg)

Career information
- High school: East (OH)
- College: Miami (OH)

Career history
- Dayton Triangles (1925, 1927)
- Stats at Pro Football Reference

Zern Carlton "Zip" Joseph (May 31, 1903 – November 24, 1977) was an American football player and automobile executive.

Joseph was born in 1903 in Hemlock, Ohio, and attended East High School in Columbus, Ohio. He played college football as an end for the Miami (OH) Redskins football team from 1922 to 1924.

He played semi-professional football for the Armco team in Ashland, Ohio. He also played professional football in the National Football League (NFL) for the Dayton Triangles in 1925 and 1927. He appeared in 11 NFL games. His brother Red Joseph also played in the NFL.

In 1943, Joseph joined General Motors as a clerk with the Fisher Body plant in Cleveland. He later became a labor relations investigator and representative at the plant. In 1945, he was transferred to the Fisher Body plant in Janesville, Wisconsin, where he became supervisor of labor relations. He was transferred in 1948 to Chevrolet as a labor relations supervisor in Cleveland. He became the personnel director at Chevrolet's Norwood Assembly plant in 1952. In 1965, he was transferred to California as the personnel director at Chevrolet's Van Nuys Assembly plant. In 1966, he became president of a General Motors division in Rancho Bernardo, California; he held that position until 1971.

Joseph died in 1977 in San Diego County, California.
