= Cornelius Johnson (wide receiver) =

American football player (born 2000)

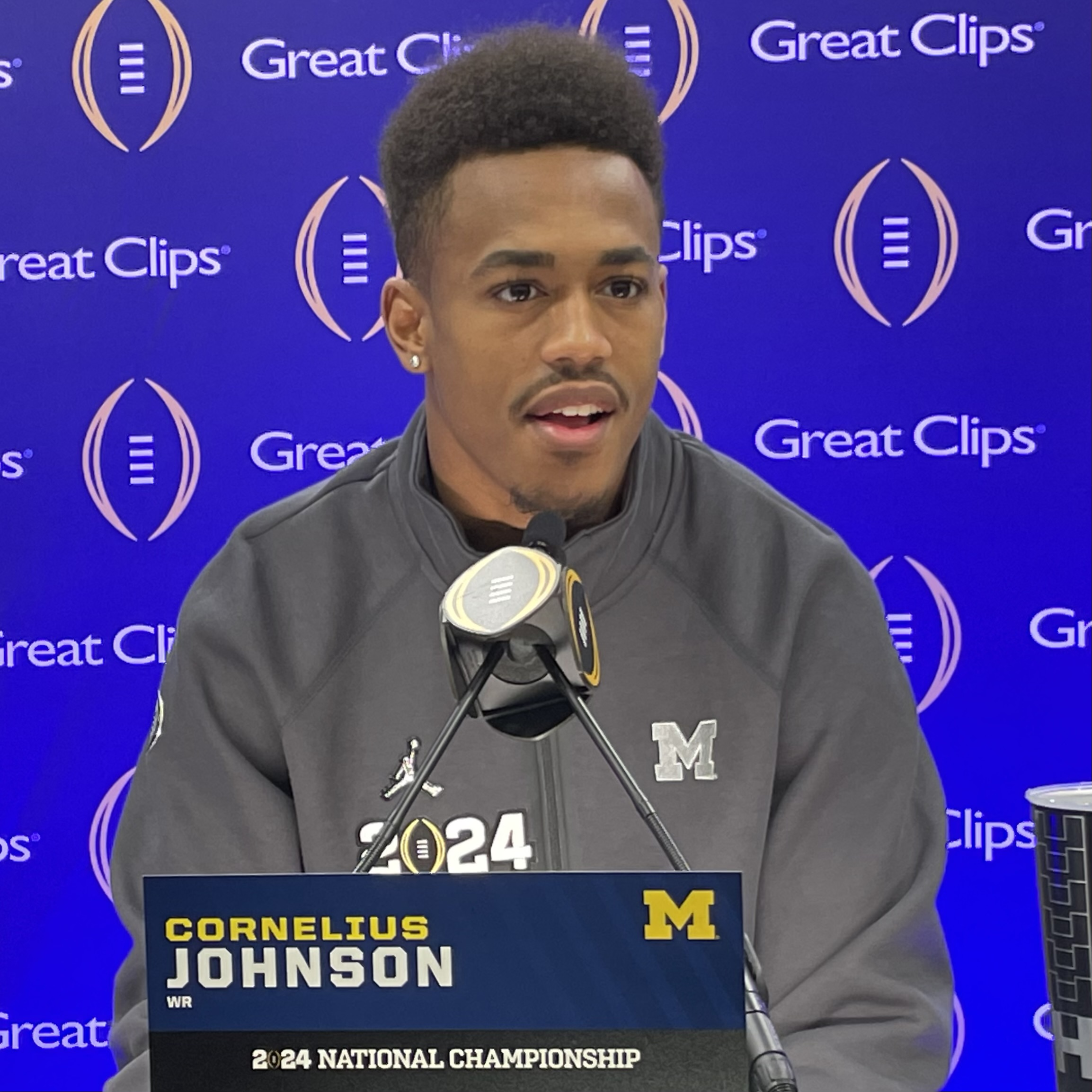
- Johnson with the Michigan Wolverines in 2024

Rhode Island Breakers
- Position: Wide receiver
- Roster status: Unsigned draft pick

Personal information
- Born: November 29, 2000 (age 25); Greenwich, Connecticut, U.S.
- Listed height: 6 ft 3 in (1.91 m)
- Listed weight: 208 lb (94 kg)

Career information
- High school: Brunswick (Greenwich)
- College: Michigan (2019–2023)
- NFL draft: 2024: 7th round, 253rd overall pick

Career history
- Los Angeles Chargers (2024)*; Green Bay Packers (2024)*; Baltimore Ravens (2025–2026)*; Rhode Island Breakers (2027-present)
- * Offseason or practice squad member only

Awards and highlights
- CFP national champion (2023)
- Stats at Pro Football Reference

Cornelius Alexius Theodore Johnson (born November 29, 2000) is an American professional football wide receiver. He played college football for the Michigan Wolverines, winning three consecutive Big Ten Conference titles and a national championship in 2023. He was selected by the Los Angeles Chargers in the 2024 NFL draft.

== Early life ==
Johnson attended Brunswick School, in Greenwich, Connecticut. As a senior, he was selected as the 2018 Gatorade Player of the Year in Connecticut.

In 2018, he caught 50 passes for 826 yards and 12 touchdowns, leading the Bruins (8–2) to the New England Prep School Athletic Council Mike Silipo Bowl Game. Selected to play in the U.S. Army All-American Bowl, Johnson ran for a score and returned a kickoff for a touchdown. A two-time All-New England honoree, he concluded his high school football career with 2,167 receiving yards and 33 touchdowns.

Johnson's mother is a graduate of the University of Michigan Medical School. In December 2018, Johnson announced his commitment to play college football at the University of Michigan.

== College career ==
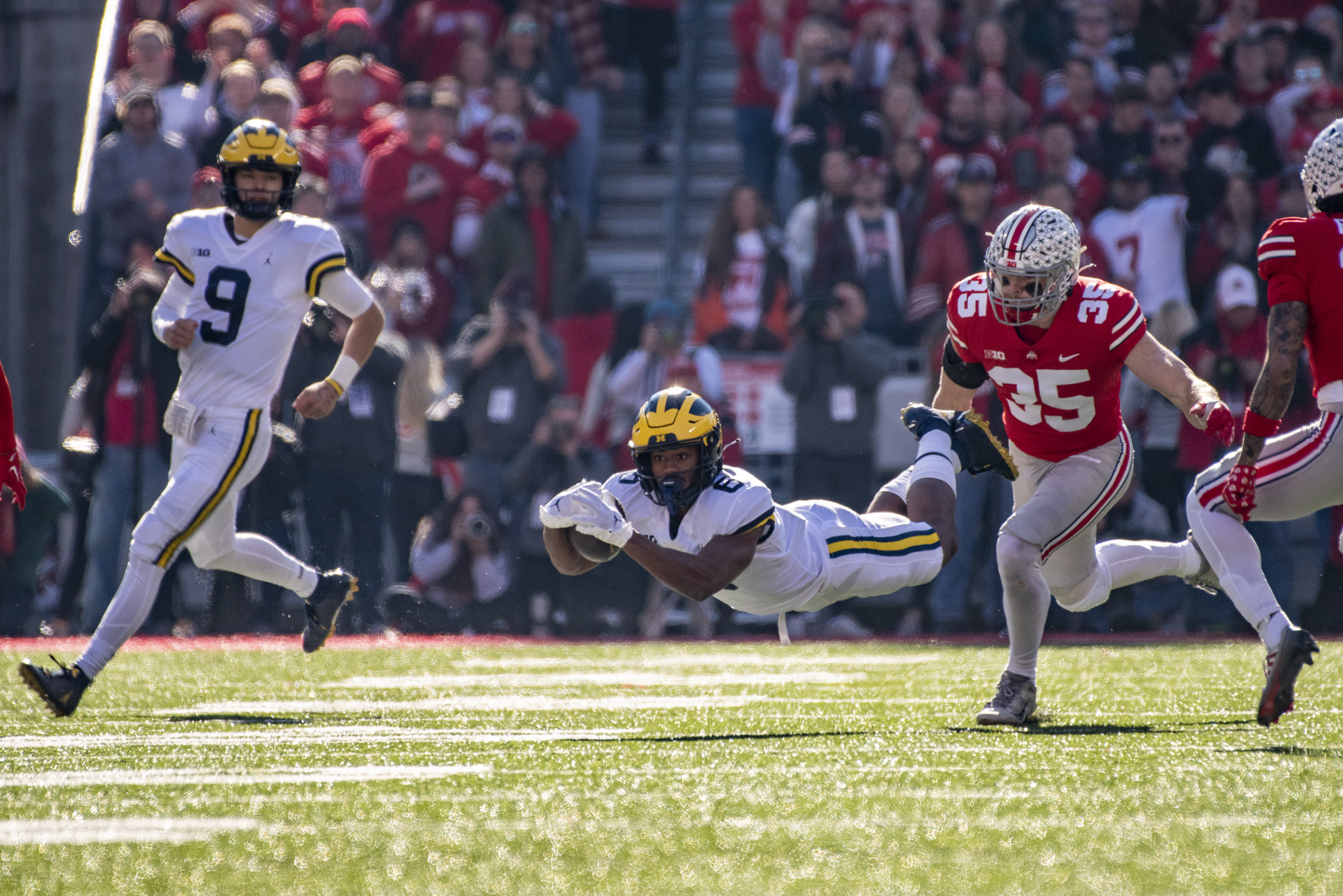
Johnson versus Ohio State in a 45–23 victory in 2022

Johnson enrolled at the University of Michigan in 2019. As a freshman, he caught four passes for 61 yards and his first career touchdown, a 39-yard pass thrown by Shea Patterson against Michigan State on November 16.

As a sophomore, in 2020, he appeared in all six games (three as a starter) in Michigan's COVID-shortened season, catching 16 passes for 254 yards, including 82 yards against Indiana, and 105 yards against Rutgers.

In 2021, as a junior, Johnson led Michigan with 39 receptions for 620 yards and three touchdowns. On September 18, he connected with Cade McNamara for an 87-yard touchdown reception, the third longest catch in Michigan football history. Against Wisconsin on October 2, he had two touchdown receptions.

As a senior, in 2022, Johnson caught 32 passes for 499 yards and 6 touchdowns. On November 26, 2022, against Ohio State, Johnson caught four passes for 160 yards, including receiving touchdowns of 69 and 75 yards, both in the second quarter, helping to lead the Wolverines to a victory over the Buckeyes.

In 2023, Johnson returned for a 5th season and won a national championship with Michigan. He was named All-Big Ten honorable mention, finishing the season with 47 receptions for 604 yards and a touchdown. He also rushed for 40 yards.

=== Statistics ===
College statistics
| Year | Team | Games | | Receiving | | | | Rushing | | | |
| Year | Team | GP | GS | Rec | Yards | Avg | TD | Att | Yards | Avg | TD |
|---|---|---|---|---|---|---|---|---|---|---|---|
| 2019 | Michigan | 12 | 0 | 4 | 61 | 15.3 | 1 | 0 | 0 | 0.0 | 0 |
| 2020 | Michigan | 6 | 3 | 16 | 254 | 15.9 | 3 | 0 | 0 | 0.0 | 0 |
| 2021 | Michigan | 14 | 14 | 39 | 620 | 15.9 | 3 | 3 | 30 | 10.0 | 0 |
| 2022 | Michigan | 14 | 14 | 32 | 499 | 15.6 | 6 | 0 | 0 | 0.0 | 0 |
| 2023 | Michigan | 15 | 14 | 47 | 604 | 12.9 | 1 | 3 | 40 | 13.3 | 0 |
| Career | | 61 | 45 | 138 | 2,038 | 14.8 | 14 | 6 | 70 | 11.7 | 0 |

== Professional career ==
Pre-draft measurables
| Height | Weight | Arm length | Hand span | Wingspan | 40-yard dash | 10-yard split | 20-yard split | 20-yard shuttle | Three-cone drill | Vertical jump | Broad jump | Bench press |
|---|---|---|---|---|---|---|---|---|---|---|---|---|
| 6 ft 2 3/4 in (1.90 m) | 212 lb (96 kg) | 31 7/8 in (0.81 m) | 8 5/8 in (0.22 m) | 6 ft 5 1/4 in (1.96 m) | 4.44 s | 1.55 s | 2.60 s | 4.37 s | 6.93 s | 37.5 in (0.95 m) | 10 ft 7 in (3.23 m) | 13 reps |
All values from NFL Combine/Pro Day

=== Los Angeles Chargers ===
Johnson was selected in the seventh round, 253rd overall, by the Los Angeles Chargers in the 2024 NFL draft. He was waived on August 27, and re-signed to the practice squad, but released a few days later.

=== Green Bay Packers ===
On September 18, 2024, Johnson signed with the Green Bay Packers practice squad. He signed a reserve/future contract with Green Bay on January 13, 2025. On August 26, Johnson was released by the Packers as part of final roster cuts.

=== Baltimore Ravens ===
On September 9, 2025, Johnson was signed to the Baltimore Ravens' practice squad. He signed a reserve/future contract with Baltimore on January 5, 2026.

On August 30, 2026, Johnson was waived by the Ravens as a part of final roster cuts.
