= Donovan Jeter =

American football player (born 1998)

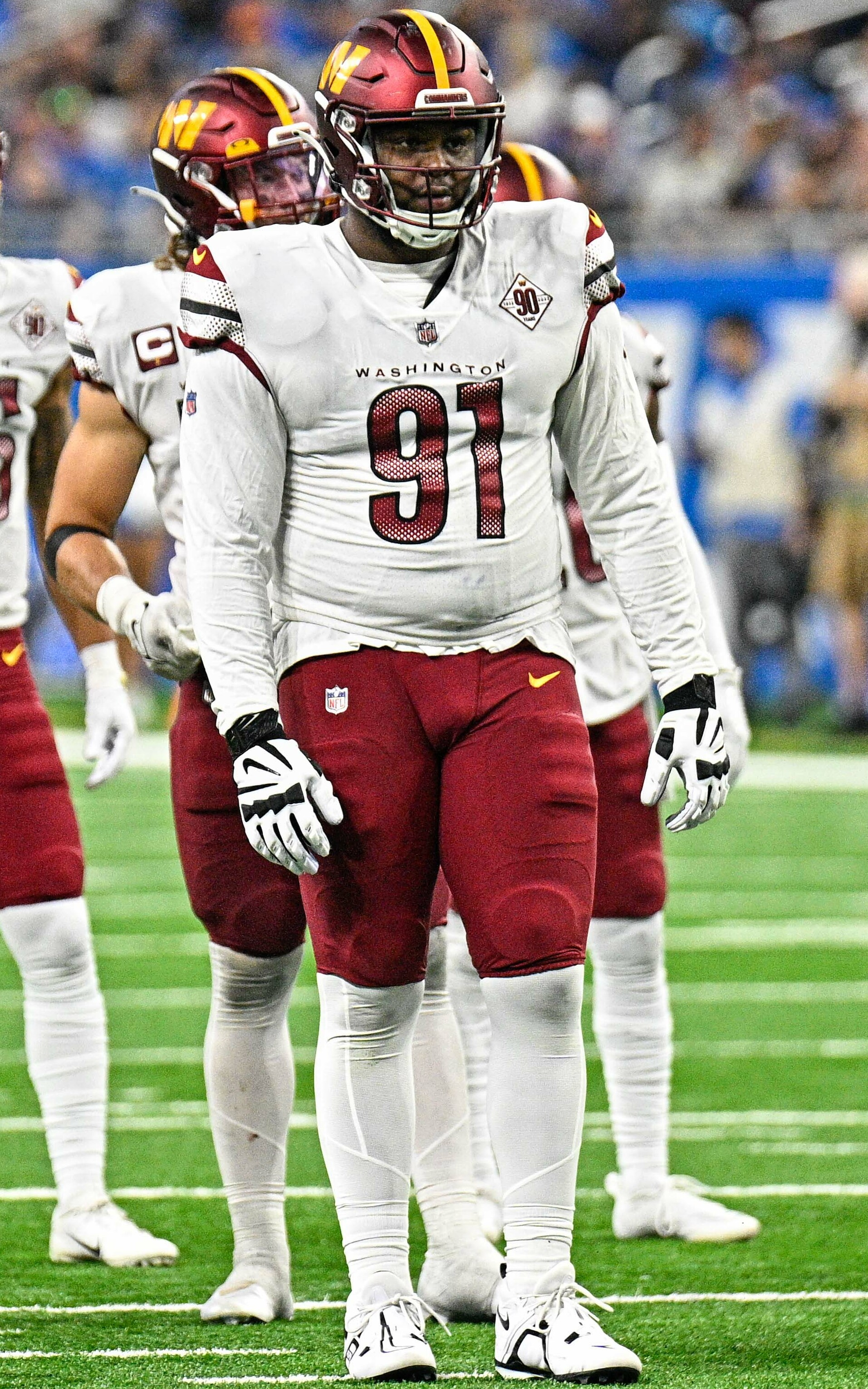
- Jeter with the Washington Commanders in 2022

Profile
- Position: Nose tackle

Personal information
- Born: December 7, 1998 (age 27); Beaver Falls, Pennsylvania, U.S.
- Listed height: 6 ft 3 in (1.91 m)
- Listed weight: 325 lb (147 kg)

Career information
- High school: Beaver Falls
- College: Michigan (2017–2021)
- NFL draft: 2022: undrafted

Career history
- Pittsburgh Steelers (2022)*; Washington Commanders (2022); Chicago Bears (2023)*; New York Giants (2023)*; Houston Roughnecks (2024)*; DC Defenders (2024)*
- * Offseason or practice squad member only

Career NFL statistics
- Total tackles: 1
- Stats at Pro Football Reference

Donovan Jeter (born December 7, 1998) is an American football nose tackle. He played college football for the Michigan Wolverines. Jeter signed with the Pittsburgh Steelers as an undrafted free agent in 2022 and has also been a member of the Washington Commanders, Chicago Bears, New York Giants, and Houston Roughnecks.

== Professional career ==
Pre-draft measurables
| Height | Weight | Arm length | Hand span | 40-yard dash | 10-yard split | 20-yard split | 20-yard shuttle | Three-cone drill | Vertical jump | Broad jump | Bench press |
|---|---|---|---|---|---|---|---|---|---|---|---|
| 6 ft 3 1/8 in (1.91 m) | 310 lb (141 kg) | 33 3/8 in (0.85 m) | 10 1/2 in (0.27 m) | 5.15 s | 1.80 s | 2.88 s | 4.88 s | 7.80 s | 31.0 in (0.79 m) | 8 ft 8 in (2.64 m) | 26 reps |
All values from Pro Day

=== Pittsburgh Steelers ===
After going unselected in the 2022 NFL draft, Jeter signed with the Pittsburgh Steelers on April 30, 2022. He was waived on August 30 as part of final roster cuts before the start of the 2022 season.

=== Washington Commanders ===
Jeter signed with the Washington Commanders on September 12, 2022. He appeared in one game before being released a week later. He was re-signed to the practice squad on September 21. Jeter was released on October 18, 2022.

=== Chicago Bears ===
On January 10, 2023, Jeter signed a reserve/futures contract with the Chicago Bears. He was waived by the Bears on August 1, 2023.

=== New York Giants ===
On August 4, 2023, Jeter signed with the New York Giants. He was waived on August 27.

=== Houston Roughnecks ===
On December 11, 2023, Jeter signed with the Houston Roughnecks of the XFL. The Roughnecks brand was transferred to the Houston Gamblers when the XFL and United States Football League (USFL) merged to create the United Football League (UFL).

=== DC Defenders ===
On January 5, 2024, Jeter was selected by the DC Defenders during the 2024 UFL dispersal draft. He was released on March 10, 2024.
