= 2020 Michigan State Spartans football team =

American college football season

2020 Michigan State Spartans football
- Conference: Big Ten Conference
- East Division
- Record: 2–5 (2–5 Big Ten)
- Head coach: Mel Tucker (1st season)
- Offensive coordinator: Jay Johnson (1st season)
- Offensive scheme: Multiple
- Defensive coordinator: Scottie Hazelton (1st season)
- Base defense: 4–3
- Home stadium: Spartan Stadium

Uniform
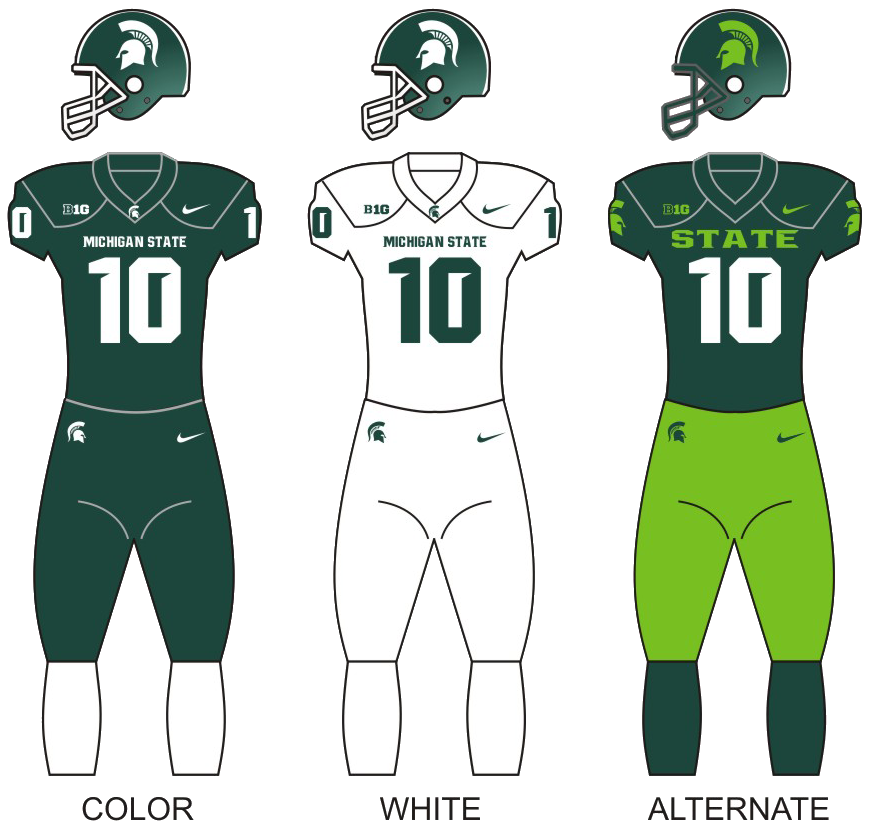

2020 Big Ten Conference football standings
	Conf.			Overall
Team	W		L	W		L
East Division
No. 2 Ohio State xy$^	5	–	0	7	–	1
No. 12 Indiana	6	–	1	6	–	2
Penn State	4	–	5	4	–	5
Maryland	2	–	3	2	–	3
Rutgers	3	–	6	3	–	6
Michigan	2	–	4	2	–	4
Michigan State	2	–	5	2	–	5
West Division
No. 10 Northwestern xy	6	–	1	7	–	2
No. 16 Iowa	6	–	2	6	–	2
Wisconsin	3	–	3	4	–	3
Minnesota	3	–	4	3	–	4
Nebraska	3	–	5	3	–	5
Purdue	2	–	4	2	–	4
Illinois	2	–	6	2	–	6
Championship: Ohio State 22, Northwestern 10
^ – College Football Playoff participant; $ – Conference champion; x – Division champion/co-champions; y – Championship game participant; Note: Due to COVID-19, the Big Ten suspended the season on August 11, but later decided to begin play on October 24. In addition to the title game that was played on December 19, the conference seeded all remaining teams for "championship week" games.; Rankings from AP Poll.

The 2020 Michigan State Spartans football team represented Michigan State University during the 2020 NCAA Division I FBS football season. The Spartans competed as members of the East Division of the Big Ten Conference and played their home games at Spartan Stadium in East Lansing, Michigan. This was the program's first season under head coach Mel Tucker.

In a limited season, which was initially canceled due to the COVID-19 pandemic before being reinstated, the Spartans compiled a 2–5 record, all in conference games. On December 20, the program announced that it would not participate in any bowl game.

== Offseason ==
=== 2020 NFL draft ===
MSU kept its streak of 80 years of having at least one player drafted in the NFL Draft when cornerback Josiah Scott was selected in the fourth round of the 2020 NFL Draft.

Round	Pick	Team	Player	Position
4	31	Jacksonville Jaguars	Josiah Scott	Cornerback
7	11	Minnesota Vikings	Kenny Willekes	Defensive End

Several other undrafted players signed free agent contracts with NFL teams:

- Cody White, Wide Receiver, Kansas City Chiefs
- Brian Lewerke, Quarterback, New England Patriots
- Raequan Williams, Defensive tackle, Philadelphia Eagles
- Joe Bachie, Linebacker New Orleans Saints
- Mike Panasiuk, Defensive tackle, Las Vegas Raiders
- Darrell Stewart Jr., Wide Receiver, Green Bay Packers
- Tyler Higby, Offensive Line, Minnesota Vikings

=== Coaching changes ===
On February 4, 2020, the Michigan State announced that head coach Mark Dantonio had retired and Mike Tressel would be taking over as interim head coach for the Spartans. Tressel was previously the team's defensive coordinator. On February 12, the school announced the hiring of Colorado head coach Mel Tucker as the university's 25th head football coach.

Tucker took approximately 10 days to assemble his assistants for the season. He brought with him from his Colorado staff offensive coordinator Jay Johnson, offensive line coach Chris Kapilovic, running backs coach William Peagler, and special teams coordinator Ross Els. Former Spartan wide receiver Courtney Hawkins was named the wide receivers coach, Ted Gilmore the tight ends coach, and Scottie Hazelton the defensive coordinator. Former MSU defensive coach Harlon Barnett returned to coach the secondary after spending two seasons as the defensive coordinator at Florida State. Ron Burton (defensive line) and Mike Tressel (safeties) were the only holdovers from Dantonio's staff.

=== Recruiting ===
College recruiting (2020)
Name	Hometown	School	Height	Weight	Commit date
Ricky White; WR	Marietta, GA	Marietta	6 ft 1 in (1.85 m)	165 lb (75 kg)	
Ricky White; WR	Recruit ratings: Scout: Rivals: 247Sports: ESPN:				
Dallas Fincher; OG	Grand Rapids, MI	East Kentwood	6 ft 4 in (1.93 m)	274 lb (124 kg)	
Dallas Fincher; OG	Recruit ratings: Scout: Rivals: 247Sports: ESPN:				
Terry Lockett; WR	Minneapolis, MN	Minnehaha Academy	6 ft 0 in (1.83 m)	165 lb (75 kg)	
Terry Lockett; WR	Recruit ratings: Scout: Rivals: 247Sports: ESPN:				
Ian Stewart; WR	Rockwood, MI	Oscar A. Carlson	6 ft 3 in (1.91 m)	200 lb (91 kg)	
Ian Stewart; WR	Recruit ratings: Scout: Rivals: 247Sports: ESPN:				
Tommy Guajardo; TE	Dearborn, MI	Dearborn	6 ft 3 in (1.91 m)	230 lb (100 kg)	
Tommy Guajardo; TE	Recruit ratings: Scout: Rivals: 247Sports: ESPN:				
Simeon Barrow Jr. WDE	Grovetown, GA	Grovetown	6 ft 2 in (1.88 m)	252 lb (114 kg)	
Simeon Barrow Jr. WDE	Recruit ratings: Scout: Rivals: 247Sports: ESPN:				
Avery Dunn; WDE	Cleveland, OH	Shaker Heights	6 ft 4 in (1.93 m)	216 lb (98 kg)	
Avery Dunn; WDE	Recruit ratings: Scout: Rivals: 247Sports: ESPN:				
Montorie Foster; WR	Lakewood, OH	St. Edward	6 ft 2 in (1.88 m)	175 lb (79 kg)	
Montorie Foster; WR	Recruit ratings: Scout: Rivals: 247Sports: ESPN:				
Chris Mayfield; SDE	Hilliard, OH	Hilliard Bradley	6 ft 2 in (1.88 m)	250 lb (110 kg)	
Chris Mayfield; SDE	Recruit ratings: Scout: Rivals: 247Sports: ESPN:				
Noah Kim; PRO	Chantilly, VA	Westfield	6 ft 2 in (1.88 m)	180 lb (82 kg)	
Noah Kim; PRO	Recruit ratings: Scout: Rivals: 247Sports: ESPN:				
Jeff Pietrowski; WDE	Lakewood, OH	St. Edward	6 ft 1 in (1.85 m)	235 lb (107 kg)	
Jeff Pietrowski; WDE	Recruit ratings: Scout: Rivals: 247Sports: ESPN:				
Cole DeMarzo; OLB	Hilton Head Island, SC	Hilton Head	6 ft 2 in (1.88 m)	200 lb (91 kg)	
Cole DeMarzo; OLB	Recruit ratings: Scout: Rivals: 247Sports: ESPN:				
Jasiyah Robinson; SDE	Groveport, OH	Groveport Madison	6 ft 3 in (1.91 m)	222 lb (101 kg)	Jan 22, 2020
Jasiyah Robinson; SDE	Recruit ratings: Scout: Rivals: 247Sports: ESPN:				
Donovan Eaglin; SDE	Manvel, TX	Manvel HS	5 ft 11 in (1.80 m)	215 lb (98 kg)	Jan 29, 2020
Donovan Eaglin; SDE	Recruit ratings: Scout: Rivals: 247Sports: ESPN:				
Nolan Rossback (Transfer Illinois); LS	Hudsonville, MI	{{{highschool}}}	6 ft 1 in (1.85 m)	215 lb (98 kg)	
Nolan Rossback (Transfer Illinois); LS	Recruit ratings: No ratings found				
Overall recruit ranking:
Note: In many cases, Scout, Rivals, 247Sports, On3, and ESPN may conflict in their listings of height and weight.; In these cases, the average was taken. ESPN grades are on a 100-point scale.; Sources: "Scout". Scout.; "Scout.com Team Recruiting Rankings". Scout.; "2020 Team Ranking". Rivals.com.

== Preseason ==
=== Preseason Big Ten poll ===
Although the Big Ten Conference has not held an official preseason poll since 2010, Cleveland.com has polled sports journalists representing all member schools as a de facto preseason media poll since 2011. For the 2020 poll, Michigan State was projected to finish in fifth in the East Division.

== COVID-19 effects on season ==
On July 9, 2020, the Big Ten announced that member teams will only play conference games in effort to reduce issues related to the ongoing COVID-19 pandemic. On July 24, the school announced that the entire team, which had returned to campus for voluntary workouts, was being placed on a 14-day quarantine after two staff members and one player tested positive for COVID-19.

On August 11, 2020, the Big Ten canceled the college football season for the fall of 2020 due to the continuing COVID-19 pandemic. On September 16, the conference reversed course and announced that a season would be played. Teams would begin play on October 24. On September 19, the conference announced an eight-game schedule.

One game, against Maryland, was canceled due to the school's COVID-19 outbreak. A scheduled rematch on December 19 as part of the Big Ten Champions Week was also canceled due to continued COVID-19 issues at Maryland.

== Personnel ==
=== Roster ===
2020 Michigan State Spartans football team roster
Players
Coaches
Offense

Pos.	#	Name	Class
WR	2	Julian Barnett	So
WR	4	C. J. Hayes	Jr
WR	5	Jayden Reed	Jr
QB	6	Theo Day	So
WR	7	Ricky White	Fr
WR	8	Jalen Nailor	Jr
QB	10	Payton Thorne	So
QB	12	Rocky Lombardi	Jr
WR	13	Laress Nelson	Sr
QB	14	Noah Kim	Fr
WR	17	Tre Mosley	So
WR	18	Tre'Von Morgan	So
WR	20	Emmanuel Flowers	Jr
QB	23	Eli McLean	So
RB	24	Elijah Collins	So
RB	26	Brandon Wright	So
RB	34	Anthony Williams Jr.	So
RB	36	Noah Sargent	Sr
RB	39	Alante Thomas	Sr
TE	40	Jonathan Brys	Jr
FB	41	Reid Burton	Sr
FB	49	Max Rosenthal	Jr
OT	55	Jordan Reid	Sr
G	56	Matt Carrick	Jr
OL	58	Spencer Brown	So
OL	59	Nick Samac	So
OT	62	Luke Campbell	Sr
OL	64	Matt Allen	Sr
OL	66	Blake Bueter	Jr
OL	67	J.D. Duplain	So
OT	68	Dan Vanopstall	So
OL	69	Tommy Liesveld	Sr
OL	71	James Ohonba	So
OL	72	Damon Kaylor	So
OL	73	Jacob Isaia	So
OL	74	Jack Henrichs	Jr
G	75	Kevin Jarvis	Sr
OT	76	A. J. Arcuri	Sr
OL	77	Dimitri Douglas	So
OT	79	Mustafa Khaleefah	Jr
WR	80	Jalen Allen	So
WR	82	Javez Alexander	So
WR	83	Montorie Foster Jr.	Fr
WR	85	Cade McDonald	So
TE	86	Parks Gissinger	So
WR	87	Jahz Watts	Jr
TE	88	Trenton Gillison	So
TE	89	Matt Dotson	Sr

Defense

Pos.	#	Name	Class
S	3	Xavier Henderson	Jr
DE	5	Michael Fletcher	So
S	7	Michael Dowell	So
CB	8	Chris Jackson	So
S	9	Dominique Long	Sr
LB	13	Marcel Lewis	So
CB	14	Davion Williams	So
CB	18	Kalon Gervin	So
LB	21	Chase Kline	So
DB	23	Andre Welch	Sr
CB	24	Tre Person	Sr
S	28	Tate Hallock	So
CB	29	Shakur Brown	Jr
LB	30	Tanner Hallock	Jr
LB	31	Edward Warinner	So
DB	32	Corey Pryor	Sr
LB	33	Jeslord Boateng	So
LB	34	Antjuan Simmons	Sr
LB	37	Dante Razzano	Sr
LB	38	Luke Fulton	So
LB	41	Charles Willekes	So
DE	42	Brent Mossburg	Jr
S	43	Jack Mandryk	Jr
DE	44	Adam Berghorst	So
LB	45	Noah Harvey	Jr
S	49	David Kruse	So
LB	53	Peter Fisk	Sr
DE	55	Zach Slade	So
DL	57	Evan Brunning	So
LB	58	Terry O'Connor	So
DT	64	Jacob Slade	So
DL	86	Drew Beesley	Sr
DL	89	Jalen Hunt	So
DE	91	Jack Camper	Jr
DE	92	DeAri Todd	Jr
DT	93	Naquan Jones	Sr
DT	94	Dashaun Mallory	So
DE	96	Jacub Panasiuk	Sr

Special teams

Pos.	#	Name	Class
K	4	Matt Coghlin	Sr
LS	51	Jude Pedrozo	So
K, P	92	Evan Morris	So
K	97	Tyler Hunt	Jr
K	98	Cole Hahn	Jr
P	99	Bryce Baringer	Jr

Head coach

- Mel Tucker

Coordinators/assistant coaches

- Scottie Hazelton (assistant head coach / defensive coordinator / linebackers)
- Jay Johnson (offensive coordinator / quarterbacks)
- Chris Kapilovic (offensive line)
- Ron Burton (defensive line)
- Harlon Barnett (defensive backs)
- Ted Gilmore (Tight Ends / special teams coordinator)
- Courtney Hawkins (wide receivers)
- William Pegler (running backs)

Legend

- (C) Team captain
- (S) Suspended
- (I) Ineligible
- Injured
- Redshirt

Roster
Last update: February 14, 2020

=== Coaching staff ===
Name	Position	Season
Mel Tucker	Head coach	1st
Jay Johnson	Offensive coordinator/quarterbacks	1st
Chris Kapilovic	Offensive Line/run game coordinator	1st
Ted Gilmore	Tight ends	1st
Courtney Hawkins	Wide receivers	1st
William Pegler	Running backs	1st
Scottie Hazelton	Defensive coordinator	1st
Ron Burton	Defensive line	7th
Harlon Barnett	Defensive backs	12th
Ross Els	Special Teams	1st
Mike Tressel	Linebackers	14th

== Schedule ==
Michigan State's 2020 schedule originally was planned to begin with a conference home game against Northwestern, followed by three non-conference opponents: the independent BYU Cougars, Toledo of the Mid-American Conference, and finally Miami of the ACC. The non-conference slate was canceled on July 9 due to the Big Ten Conference's decision to play a conference-only schedule due to the COVID-19 pandemic.

On August 4, the Big Ten Conference announced the schedule for all Big Ten teams. In conference play, the Spartans were play all members of the East Division, as well as Northwestern, Iowa, and Minnesota from the West Division. The season was canceled by the conference on August 11, 2020.

On September 19, the conference changed course and announced a new, revised, eight-game schedule. A ninth game will be played the week of December 19 where the first place teams in each division will play for the Big Ten Championship, while the remaining teams will play the same-seeded team in the opposite division.

On November 19, it was announced that the November 21 game against Maryland had been canceled as all team-related activities were paused because of an elevated number of coronavirus cases within the Terrapins' program. A rescheduled game against Maryland as part of Big Ten Champions Week was also canceled due to COVID-19 issues at Maryland.

Date	Time	Opponent	Site	TV	Result	Attendance
October 24	12:00 p.m.	Rutgers	Spartan Stadium; East Lansing, MI	BTN	L 27–38	0
October 31	12:00 p.m.	at No. 13 Michigan	Michigan Stadium; Ann Arbor, MI (Paul Bunyan Trophy)	FOX	W 27–24	615
November 7	12:00 p.m.	at Iowa	Kinnick Stadium; Iowa City, IA	ESPN	L 7–49	1,441
November 14	12:00 p.m.	No. 10 Indiana	Spartan Stadium; East Lansing, MI (Old Brass Spittoon)	ABC	L 0–24	340
~~November 21~~	~~12:00 p.m.~~	at ~~Maryland~~	~~Maryland Stadium~~; ~~College Park, MD~~	~~BTN~~	No Contest	_
November 28	3:30 p.m.	No. 8 Northwestern	Spartan Stadium; East Lansing, MI	ESPN2	W 29–20	0
December 5	12:00 p.m.	No. 4 Ohio State	Spartan Stadium; East Lansing, MI	ABC	L 12–52	0
December 12	12:00 p.m.	at Penn State	Beaver Stadium; University Park, PA (Land Grant Trophy)	ABC	L 24–39	0
~~December 19~~	~~7:30 p.m.~~	at ~~Maryland~~	~~Maryland Stadium~~; ~~College Park, MD~~ (~~Champions Week~~)	~~BTN~~	No Contest	_
Rankings from AP Poll released prior to the game; All times are in Eastern time

== Rankings ==
Ranking movements Legend: ██ Increase in ranking ██ Decrease in ranking — = Not ranked RV = Received votes
	Week																	
Poll	Pre	1	2	3	4	5	6	7	8	9	10	11	12	13	14	15	16	Final
AP	—	—	—	—	—	—	—	—	—	RV	—	—	—	—	—	—	—	
Coaches	—	—	—	—	—	—	—	—	—	RV	—	—	—	—	—	—	—	
CFP	Not released												—	—	—	—	—	Not released

== Radio ==
Radio coverage for all games will be broadcast statewide on the Spartans Sports Network

== Game summaries ==
=== Rutgers ===
Week One: Rutgers at Michigan State – Game summary

Quarter	1	2	3	4	Total
Rutgers	14	14	0	10	38
Michigan State	7	6	7	7	27

at Spartan Stadium

- Date: October 24, 2020
- Game time: 12:00 p.m.
- Game weather: 44°F, Wind: 5 mph NNW, Crisp fall afternoon
- Referee: J. Servinski
- TV announcers (BTN): Lisa Byington, Matt Millen

Game information

First Quarter

- (11:41) RU TD: Pacheco, Isiah 12 yd run (Fava, Guy kick)
  Rutgers 7–0; 10 plays, 75 yards, 3:41
- (06:57) RU TD: Langan, Johnny 1 yd run (Fava, Guy kick)
  Rutgers 140; 4 plays, 1 yards, 1:23
- (00:23) MSU TD: Reed, Jayden 50 yd pass from Lombardi, Rocky (Coghlin, Matt kick)
  Rutgers 14–7; 9 plays, 86 yards, 2:59

Second Quarter

- (11:32 RU TD: Vedral, Noah 24 yd run (Fava, Guy kick)
  Rutgers 21–7; 2 plays, 23 yards, 0:46
- (03:13) MSU FG: Coghlin, Matt 45 yd field goal
  Rutgers 21–10; 4 plays, 3 yards, 2:52
- (00:36) RU TD:- Pacheco, Isiah 3 yd run (Fava, Guy kick)
  Rutgers 28–10; 6 plays, 53 yards, 2:26
- (00:00) MSU FG: Coghlin, Matt 48 yd field goal
  Rutgers 28–13; 6 plays, 33 yards, 0:36

Third Quarter

- (06:30) MSU TD: Nailor, Jalen 30 yd pass from Lombardi, Rocky (Coghlin, Matt kick)
  Rutgers 28–20; 1 plays, 30 yards,0:08

Fourth Quarter

- 912:20) RU FG: Fava, Guy 44 yd field goal
  Rutgers 31–20; 14 plays, 54 yards, 6:11
- (04:38) RU TD: Jones, Shameen 14 yd pass from Vedral, Noah (Fava, Guy kick)
  Rutgers 38–20; 4 plays, 26 yards, 2:19
- (01:53) MSU TD: Reed, Jayden 4 yd pass from Lombardi, Rocky (Coghlin, Matt kick)
  Rutgers 38–27; 9 plays, 65 yards, TOP 2:45

Passing

- Rutgers – Noah Vedral: 18/29, 169 yards, 1 TD, 1 INT
- MSU – Rocky Lombardi: 31/43, 319 yards, 3 TD, 2 INT

Rushing

- Rutgers – Isiah Pacheco: 19 carries, 73 yards, 2 TD
- MSU – Jordan Simmons: 14 carries, 48 yards

Receiving

- Rutgers – Bo Melton: 4 receptions, 50 yards
- MSU – Jayden Reed: 11 receptions, 128 yards, 2 TD

MSU opened the 2020 season at home against Rutgers. Rutgers scored on their first possession, moving 75 yards before Isiah Pacheco rushed for a 12-yard touchdown to give the Scarlet Knights the early 7–0 lead. MSU quickly turned the ball over to Rutgers on their first offensive play as Jayden Reed fumbled and the Knights took over at MSU's 44. The Spartan defense forced a three-and-out, but the offense again turned the ball over as Rocky Lombardi fumbled the ball and Rutgers took over at the MSU four-yard line. A one-yard touchdown run a few plays later put the Knights up 14–0 with just under seven minutes remaining in the quarter. MSU's offense took the ensuing kickoff at mid-field and moved to the Rutgers' 42-yard line. However, MSU turned the ball over again, this time on downs, failing to get the first down on a fourth and three play. After a Rutgers' punt, Lombardi hit Reed on a 50-yard pass to bring MSU within seven points. Another Knights' punt gave MSU the ball with 14 minutes remaining in the second quarter. However, once again, the MSU offense turned the ball over as Lombardi was intercepted and Rutgers took over inside the MSU 30-yard line. Two plays later, a Rutgers' 24-yard touchdown run moved the Knights' lead to 21–7. MSU answered with an 11-play drive that moved into Rutgers territory, but another Jayden Reed fumble gave the ball back to Rutgers with less than eight minutes remaining in the half. MSU took the ball back on an interception by Shakur Brown and MSU notched a field goal to draw within 21–10. With just over three minutes remaining in the half, Rutgers pushed the lead to 28–10 with a three-yard touchdown run. Matt Coghlin hit his second field goal of the game as time expired to make the score 28–13 at the half.

On the first possession of the second half, MSU again turned the ball over on a Jordan Simmons fumble. Rutgers could not capitalize and punted the ball back to MSU. MSU was forced to punt, but a Rutgers fumble on the punt gave MSU the ball at the Rutgers 30. Jalen Nailor scored on the next play, a 30-yard touchdown catch to narrow the lead to 28–20. A Rutgers' fumble on their ensuing possession set MSU up at the 29-yard line. However, the Spartans were again stopped on a fourth down run, turning the ball over on downs. A Rutgers' field goal to start the fourth quarter pushed the Knights' lead to 31–20. The teams exchanged punts before Rutgers put the game out of reach with a 14-yard touchdown pass with just under five minutes remaining in the game. Another Jayden Reed touchdown catch brought the Spartans within 11. A Rutgers' punt preceded another turnover, the seventh in the game, as Lombardi was intercepted with under 40 seconds remaining. The Knights were able to run out the clock as the Spartans fell 38–27.

=== Michigan ===
Week Two: Michigan State at Michigan – Game summary

Quarter	1	2	3	4	Total
Michigan State	7	7	6	7	27
No. 13 Michigan	7	3	7	7	24

at Michigan Stadium

- Date: Oct 31, 2020
- Game time: 12:00 p.m.
- Game weather: 45°F, Wind: 10–15 mph S, Sunny
- Game attendance: 615
- Referee: T. Stapleton
- TV announcers (FOX): Gus Johnson, Joel Klatt

Game information

First Quarter

- (10:57) MSU TD: White, Ricky 30 yd pass from Lombardi, Rocky (Coghlin, Matt kick)
  Michigan State 7–0; 4 plays, 71 yards, 1:14
- (07:01) UM TD: Corum, Blake 8 yd run (Nordin, Quinn kick)
  Tied 7–7; 8 plays, 60 yards, 3:56

Second Quarter

- (09:40) MSU TD: Heyward, Connor 2 yd pass from Lombardi, Rocky (Coghlin, Matt kick)
  Michigan State 14–7; 6 plays, 68 yards, 2:01
- (02:49) UM FG: Nordin, Quinn 23 yd field goal
  Michigan State 14–10; 9 plays, 70 yards, 3:37

Third Quarter

- (12:26) MSU FG: Coghlin, Matt 27 yd field goal
  Michigan State 17–10; 5 plays, 52 yards, 1:03
- (08:00) UM TD: Corum, Blake 1 yd run (Nordin, Quinn kick)
  Tied 17–17; 11 plays, 75 yards, 4:26
- (04:23) MSU FG: Coghlin, Matt 51 yd field goal
  Michigan State 20–17; 9 plays, 45 yards, 3:37

Fourth Quarter

- (05:11) MSU TD: Heyward, Connor 13 yd pass from Lombardi, Rocky (Coghlin, Matt kick)
  Michigan State 27–17; 11 plays, 92 yards, 4:37
- (00:37) UM TD: Haskins, Hassan 2 yd run (Nordin, Quinn kick)
  Michigan State 27–24; 18 plays, 93 yards, 4:34

Passing

- Michigan – Joe Milton: 32/51, 300 yards
- MSU – Rocky Lombardi: 17/32, 323 yards, 3 TD

Rushing

- Michigan – Joe Milton: 12 carries, 63 yards
- MSU – Jordan Simmons: 14 carries, 59 yards

Receiving

- Michigan – Roman Wilson: 5 receptions, 71 yards
- MSU – Ricky White: 8 receptions, 196 yards, 1 TD

In their first road game of the season, the Spartans traveled to face their rival, Michigan, for the Paul Bunyan Trophy. Despite being a multiple touchdown underdog, the Spartans took the early lead after each team traded punts when Rocky Lombardi hit Ricky White for a 30-yard touchdown pass. However, Michigan quickly responded by scoring on an 11-yard touchdown run following an eight-play drive to tie the game at seven. Each team again was forced to punt on their next two possessions as the game moved to the second quarter. Lombardi put the Spartans up again on a two-yard touchdown pass to Connor Heyward moving the Spartan lead to 14–7. Again, each team traded punts before the Wolverines settled for a field goal with 2:49 remaining in the half. Another exchange of punts left MSU with the ball with less than a minute remaining in the half as they ran out the clock to go to halftime with the three-point lead.

In the second half, Michigan punted on their first possession and the Spartans moved the ball into Wolverine territory on the ensuing possession, but settled for another Matt Coghlin field goal to extend the lead to 17–10. Michigan tied it on their next possession with a one-yard touchdown run to put the score at 17–17. MSU retook the lead on their next possession as Coghlin connected on a 51-yard field goal to move MSU into the lead at 20–17. Following a Michigan punt, MSU moved to the Wolverine 23, but Coghlin missed a 40-yard field goal that would have moved the Spartan lead to six points. Michigan again failed to move the ball and was forced to punt on their next possession. Following the punt, MSU took over at their own eight-yard line with just under 10 minutes remaining in the game. The Spartans, helped by a Ricky White 31 yard reception, moved to the Michigan 13 with just over five minutes remaining. Lombardi then hit Heyward again for a 13-yard touchdown catch and run to push the Spartan lead to 10 at 27–17. The Wolverines scored on their next possession, but the 18-play drive took over four and a half minutes and left less than 40 seconds remaining on the clock while the Spartans held a 27–24 lead. The onside kick was recovered by Heyward and Lombardi gave the Spartans on a fourth down sneak to run out the clock as the Spartans defeated their rivals 27–24. The win moved MSU to 1–1 on the season.

=== Iowa ===
Week Three: Michigan State at Iowa – Game summary

Quarter	1	2	3	4	Total
Michigan State	0	0	7	0	7
Iowa	14	21	7	7	49

at Kinnick Stadium

- Date: Nov 7, 2020
- Game time: 12:00 p.m.
- Game weather: 6°F, Wind: 12 mph S, Sunny
- Game attendance: 1,441
- Referee: Ron Snodgrass
- TV announcers (ESPN): Bob Wischusen, Dan Orlovsky

Game information

First Quarter

- (11:07) Iowa TD: Goodson, Tyler 3 yd run (Duncan, Keith kick)
  Iowa 7–0; 8 plays, 75 yards, 3:53
- (04:31) Iowa TD: Smith, Brandon 14 yd pass from Petras, Spencer (Duncan, Keith kick)
  Iowa 14–0; 10 plays, 74 yards, 3:57

Second Quarter

- (11:16) Iowa TD: Goodson, Tyler 9 yd run (Duncan, Keith kick)
  Iowa 21–0; 7 plays, 47 yards, 3:00
- (01:57) Iowa TD: Jones, Charlie 54 yd punt return (Duncan, Keith kick)
  Iowa 28–0
- (01:30) Iowa TD: Moss, Riley 54 yd interception (Duncan, Keith kick)
  Iowa 35–0

Third Quarter

- (10:06) MSU TD: Hunt, Tyler 1 yd run (Coghlin, Matt kick)
  Iowa 35–7; 12 plays, 75 yards, 4:54
- (08:47) Iowa TD: Sargent, Mekhi 2 yd run (Duncan, Keith kick)
  Iowa 42–7; 4 plays, 75 yards, 1:19

Fourth Quarter

- (11:57) Iowa TD: Sargent, Mekhi 6 yd run (Duncan, Keith kick)
  Iowa 49–7; 3 plays, 45 yards, 1:30

Passing

- Iowa – Spencer Petras: 15/27, 167 yards, 1 TD
- MSU – Rocky Lombardi: 17/37, 227 yards, 3 INT

Rushing

- Iowa – Tyler Goodson: 14 carries, 113 yards, 2 TD
- MSU – Jordan Simmons: 9 carries, 34 yards

Receiving

- Iowa – Tyrone Tracy: 4 receptions, 38 yards
- MSU – Jalen Nailor: 4 receptions, 119 yards

=== At Indiana ===
Week Four: Michigan State at Indiana – Game summary

Quarter	1	2	3	4	Total
Michigan State	0	0	0	0	0
No. 10 Indiana	14	10	0	0	24

at Spartan Stadium

- Date: Nov 14, 2020
- Game time: 12:00 p.m.
- Game weather: 38°F, Wind: 6 mph SSE, Sunny
- Game attendance: 340
- Referee: J. O'Neill
- TV announcers (ABC): Dave Pasch, Greg McElroy

Game information

First Quarter

- (02:11) IND TD: Scott, Stevie 8 yd run (Campbell, C. kick)
  Indiana 7–0; 7 plays, 50 yards, 3:15
- (01:14) IND TD: Fryfogle, Ty 16 yd pass from Penix, Michael (Campbell, C. kick)
  Indiana 14–0; 2 plays, 16 yards, 0:15

Second Quarter

- (09:22) IND FG: Campbell, C. 21 yd field goal
  Indiana 17–0; 7 plays, 22 yards, 2:23
- (04:56) IND TD: Fryfogle, Ty 65 yd pass from Penix, Michael (Campbell, C. kick)
  Indiana 24–0; 5 plays, 79 yards, 2:40

Passing

- Indiana – Michael Penix Jr.: 25/38, 320 yards, 2 TD, 2 INT
- MSU – Payton Thorne: 10/20, 110 yards, 1 INT

Rushing

- Indiana – Stevie Scott: 23 carries, 84 yards, 1 TD
- MSU – Connor Heyward: 5 carries, 27 yards

Receiving

- Indiana – Ty Fryfogle: 11 receptions, 200 yards, 2 TD
- MSU – Jayden Reed: 7 receptions, 63 yards

=== Northwestern ===
Week Six: Northwestern at Michigan State – Game summary

Quarter	1	2	3	4	Total
No. 8 Northwestern	0	6	7	7	20
Michigan State	10	7	0	12	29

at Spartan Stadium

- Date: Nov 28, 2020
- Game time: 3:30 p.m.
- Game weather: 45 °F, Wind: 7 mph SW, Sunny, light clouds
- Game attendance: 0
- Referee: M. Kluczynski
- TV announcers (ESPN): Clay Matvick, Rocky Boiman

Game information

First Quarter

- MSU – Jalen Nailor 75-yard pass from Rocky Lombardi (Matt Coghlin kick), 10:34. Michigan State 7–0. Drive: 2 plays, 81 yards, 0:41.
- MSU – Matt Coghlin 22-yard field goal, 7:06. Michigan State 10–0. Drive: 4 plays, 6 yards, 1:18.

Second Quarter

- MSU – Jayden Reed 15-yard pass from Rocky Lombardi (Matt Coghlin kick), 14:55. Michigan State 17–0. Drive: 13 plays, 85 yards, 5:44.
- NU – Charlie Kuhbander 42-yard field goal, 11:02. Michigan State 17–3. Drive: 13 plays, 51 yards, 3:53.
- NU – Charlie Kuhbander 32-yard field goal, 6:35. Michigan State 17–6. Drive: 9 plays, 42 yards, 1:45.

Third Quarter

- NU – Peyton Ramsey 1-yard run (Charlie Kuhbander kick), 10:39. Michigan State 17–13. Drive: 10 plays, 75 yards, 4:21.

Fourth Quarter

- NU – Cam Porter 3-yard run (Charlie Kuhbander kick), 13:54. Northwestern 20–17. Drive: 8 plays, 37 yards, 3:34.
- MSU – Matt Coghlin 44-yard field goal, 10:11. Tied 20–20. Drive: 7 plays, 27 yards, 3:04.
- MSU – Matt Coghlin 48-yard field goal, 3:35. Michigan State 23–20. Drive: 7 plays, 19 yards, 2:47.
- MSU – Kalon Gervin 0-yard fumble recovery, 0:00. Michigan State 29–20.

Top Passers

- NU – Peyton Ramsey – 21/43, 210 yards, 2 INT
- MSU – Rocky Lombardi – 11/27, 167 yards, 2 TD, INT

Top Rushers

- NU – Drake Anderson – 10 rushes, 41 yards
- MSU – Connor Heyward – 24 rushes, 96 yards

Top Receivers

- NU – Riley Lees – 4 receptions, 59 yards
- MSU – Jalen Nailor – 3 receptions, 99 yards, TD

=== Ohio State ===
Week Seven: Ohio State at Michigan State – Game summary

Quarter	1	2	3	4	Total
No. 3 Ohio State	14	14	10	14	52
Michigan State	0	0	7	5	12

at Spartan Stadium

- Date: Dec 5, 2020
- Game time: 12:06 p.m.
- Game weather: 34 °F, Wind: 4 mph NNW, Cloudy
- Game attendance: 0
- Referee: Larry Smith
- TV announcers (ABC): Chris Fowler, Kirk Herbstreit, Maria Taylor

Game information

First Quarter
Second Quarter
Third Quarter
Fourth Quarter

Top passers

- OSU – Justin Fields – 17/24, 199 yards, 2 TD
- MSU – Payton Thorne – 16/25, 147 yards, INT

Top rushers

- OSU – Trey Sermon – 10 carries, 112 yards, TD
- MSU – Payton Thorne – 9 carries, 42 yards, TD

Top receivers

- OSU – Chris Olave – 10 receptions, 139 yards, TD
- MSU – Jayden Reed – 5 receptions, 79 yards

=== Penn State ===
Week Eight: Michigan State at Penn State – Game summary

Quarter	1	2	3	4	Total
Michigan State	0	21	3	0	24
Penn State	3	7	15	14	39

at Beaver Stadium

- Date: Dec 12, 2020
- Game time: 12:00 p.m.
- Game weather: 45 °F, Wind: 3 mph SSW, Partly Cloudy
- Game attendance: 0
- Referee: R. Snodgrass
- TV announcers (ABC): Dave Flemming, Rod Gilmore
- ESPN box score

Game information

First quarter

- PSU – Jake Pinegar, 24-yard field goal, 6:06 (PSU 3–0)

Second quarter

- MSU – Jalen Nailor, 45-yard TD pass from Payton Thorne, Matt Coghlin kick good, 13:50 (MSU 7–3)
- PSU – Sean Clifford, 31-yard TD run, Pinegar kick good, 10:00 (PSU 10–7)
- MSU – Tre'Von Morgan, 26-yard TD pass from Thorne, Coghlin kick good, 6:24 (MSU 14–10)
- MSU – Nailor, 7-yard TD pass from Thorne, Coghlin kick good, 1:26 (MSU 21–10)

Third quarter

- PSU – Parker Washington, 8-yard TD pass from Clifford, Jahan Dotson 2-point conversion pass from Clifford, 10:07 (MSU 21–18)
- MSU – Coghlin, 23-yard field goal, 1:59 (MSU 24–18)
- PSU – Will Levis, 1-yard TD run, Pinegar kick good, 0:02 (PSU 25–24)

Fourth quarter

- PSU – Washington, 49-yard TD pass from Clifford, Pinegar kick good, 12:18 (PSU 32–24)
- PSU – Dotson, 81-yard punt return for TD, Pinegar kick good, 11:24 (PSU 39–24)

Top passers

- MSU – Payton Thorne – 22/39, 325 yards, 3 TD, INT
- PSU – Sean Clifford – 17/27, 232 yards, 2 TD

Top rushers

- MSU – Jordon Simmons – 14 carries, 72 yards
- PSU – Sean Clifford – 9 carries, 48 yards, TD

Top receivers

- MSU – Jalen Nailor – 6 receptions, 100 yards, 2 TD
- PSU – Jahan Dotson – 8 receptions, 106 yards

Top defenders

- MSU – Antjuan Simmons – 10 tackles, 0.5 tackles-for-loss (TFL)
- PSU – Jaquan Brisker – 9 tackles, 1.5 tackles-for-loss (TFL), INT
