= 2022 Michigan State Spartans football team =

American college football season

2022 Michigan State Spartans football
- Conference: Big Ten Conference
- East Division
- Record: 0–7, 5 wins vacated (0–6, 3 wins vacated Big Ten)
- Head coach: Mel Tucker (3rd season)
- Offensive coordinator: Jay Johnson (3rd season)
- Offensive scheme: Multiple
- Defensive coordinator: Scottie Hazelton (3rd season)
- Base defense: 4–3
- Home stadium: Spartan Stadium

2022 Big Ten Conference football standings
| | Conf. | | | Overall |
| Team | W | | L | W | | L |
|---|---|---|---|---|---|---|
East Division
| No. 3 Michigan xy$^ | 9 | – | 0 | 13 | – | 1 |
| No. 4 Ohio State ^ | 8 | – | 1 | 11 | – | 2 |
| No. 7 Penn State | 7 | – | 2 | 11 | – | 2 |
| Maryland | 4 | – | 5 | 8 | – | 5 |
| Indiana | 2 | – | 7 | 4 | – | 8 |
| Rutgers | 1 | – | 8 | 4 | – | 8 |
| Michigan State† | 0 | – | 6 | 0 | – | 7 |
West Division
| Purdue xy | 6 | – | 3 | 8 | – | 6 |
| Illinois | 5 | – | 4 | 8 | – | 5 |
| Iowa | 5 | – | 4 | 8 | – | 5 |
| Minnesota | 5 | – | 4 | 9 | – | 4 |
| Wisconsin | 4 | – | 5 | 7 | – | 6 |
| Nebraska | 3 | – | 6 | 4 | – | 8 |
| Northwestern | 1 | – | 8 | 1 | – | 11 |
Championship: Michigan 43, Purdue 22
^ – College Football Playoff participant; $ – Conference champion; x – Division champion/co-champions; y – Championship game participant; † — NCAA vacated all wins for Michigan State (5–7, 3–6); Rankings from AP Poll

The 2022 Michigan State Spartans football team was an American football team that represented Michigan State University in the East Division of the Big Ten Conference during the 2022 NCAA Division I FBS football season. The Spartans were led by third-year head coach Mel Tucker. The Spartans played their home games at Spartan Stadium in East Lansing, Michigan.

The Spartans opened the season ranked No. 15 in the AP poll. After winning the first two games of the season, the Spartans lost four consecutive games against Washington, Minnesota, Maryland, and Ohio State. They rebounded with a double-overtime victory over Wisconsin. However, the Spartans lost three of their final five games, including to rival Michigan, to end the season. They finished the season 5–7, 3–6 in Big Ten play to finish in fifth place in the East division. They failed to qualify for a bowl game for the second time in three years. On November 12, 2025, the 5 wins were vacated as a result of an NCAA settlement over recruiting violations during Mel Tucker's tenure.

== Offseason ==
=== 2022 NFL draft ===
Consensus All-American running back Kenneth Walker III, offensive lineman Kevin Jarvis, and wide receiver Jalen Nailor declared for the NFL draft. After breaking its 80-year streak of having players taken in the NFL draft the previous year, four MSU players were drafted in the 2022 NFL draft.

| Round | Pick | Team | Player | Position |
|---|---|---|---|---|
| 2 | 41 | Seattle Seahawks | Kenneth Walker III | RB |
| 6 | 191 | Minnesota Vikings | Jalen Nailor | WR |
| 6 | 208 | Pittsburgh Steelers | Connor Heyward | TE |
| 7 | 261 | Los Angeles Rams | AJ Arcuri | OT |

Several other undrafted players signed free agent contracts with NFL teams:

- Jacub Panasiuk, defensive end, Washington Commanders
- Kevin Jarvis, offensive lineman, Detroit Lions

=== Coaching changes ===
On December 4, 2021, cornerbacks coach Travares Tillman took the defensive backs coaching position at his alma mater, Georgia Tech. On December 24, running backs coach William Peagler left MSU to become the tight ends coach at Florida. On January 13, 2022, the school named Effrem Reed. who had previously served as an offensive analyst with the Spartans, the new running backs coach. On January 15, the school officially named Brandon Jordan as a pass rush specialist coach. On January 16, it was announced that defensive line coach Ron Burton was leaving the school after eight years with the Spartans. On February 8, the school named Georgia Tech assistant Marco Coleman the new defensive line coach.

=== Returning players ===
Leading receiver Jayden Reed announced he would return for another season at MSU. MSU captain and leading tackler, safety Xavier Henderson, also announced he would return for the 2022 season.

=== Transfers ===
==== Outgoing ====
| Name | Pos. | New School |
|---|---|---|
| Kyle King | DT | Ball State |
| Tyson Watson | DE | UMass |
| Cole De Marzo | LB | Wyoming |
| Ian Stewart | WR | Temple |
| Kameron Allen | TE | SMU |
| Jack Camper | DE | Virginia |
| Trenton Gillison | TE | Youngstown State |
| James Ohnoba | G | Louisiana |
| Ricky White | WR | UNLV |
| C.J. Hayes | S | Syracuse |
| Michael Gravely Jr. | CB | |
| Nick Chudler | LS | |
| Evan Johnson | K | |
| Emmanuel Flowers | CB | Samford |
| Michael Dowell | S | Miami (OH) |
| Alex Okelo | DE | |
| Chase Kline | LB | Eastern Michigan |
| Kalon Gervin | CB | Kansas |
| Jack Bouwmeester | P | Utah |

==== Incoming ====
| Name | Pos. | Former School |
|---|---|---|
| Khris Bogle | LB | Florida |
| Aaron Brule | LB | Mississippi State |
| Jacoby Windmon | LB | UNLV |
| Jalen Berger | RB | Wisconsin |
| Ameer Speed | DB | Georgia |
| Jarek Broussard | RB | Colorado |
| Daniel Barker | TE | Illinois |
| Brian Greene | OL | Washington State |
| Ben Patton | K | Auburn |

=== Recruiting ===
College recruiting (2022)
| Name | Hometown | School | Height | Weight | Commit date |
|---|---|---|---|---|---|
| Katin Houser; QB | Bellflower, CA | St. John Bosco | 6 ft 3 in (1.91 m) | 200 lb (91 kg) | |
| Katin Houser; QB | Recruit ratings: Rivals: 247Sports: ESPN: | | | | |
| Germie Bernard; WR | Henderson, NV | Liberty | 6 ft 2 in (1.88 m) | 195 lb (88 kg) | |
| Germie Bernard; WR | Recruit ratings: Rivals: 247Sports: ESPN: | | | | |
| Dillon Tatum; ATH | West Bloomfield, MI | West Bloomfield | 5 ft 11 in (1.80 m) | 190 lb (86 kg) | |
| Dillon Tatum; ATH | Recruit ratings: Rivals: 247Sports: ESPN: | | | | |
| Jack Nickel; TE | Alpharetta, GA | Milton | 6 ft 4 in (1.93 m) | 235 lb (107 kg) | |
| Jack Nickel; TE | Recruit ratings: Rivals: 247Sports: ESPN: | | | | |
| Chase Carter; DE | Minneapolis MN | Minnehaha Academy | 6 ft 6 in (1.98 m) | 225 lb (102 kg) | |
| Chase Carter; DE | Recruit ratings: Rivals: 247Sports: ESPN: | | | | |
| Alex VanSumeren; DL | Essexville, MI | Garber | 6 ft 3 in (1.91 m) | 300 lb (140 kg) | |
| Alex VanSumeren; DL | Recruit ratings: Rivals: 247Sports: ESPN: | | | | |
| Jaden Mangham; ATH | Franklin, MI | Wylie E. Groves | 6 ft 3 in (1.91 m) | 185 lb (84 kg) | |
| Jaden Mangham; ATH | Recruit ratings: Rivals: 247Sports: ESPN: | | | | |
| Antonio Gates Jr. WR | Dearborn, MI | Fordson | 6 ft 1 in (1.85 m) | 185 lb (84 kg) | |
| Antonio Gates Jr. WR | Recruit ratings: Rivals: 247Sports: ESPN: | | | | |
| Caleb Coley; CB | Warner Robins, GA | Houston County | 5 ft 11 in (1.80 m) | 166 lb (75 kg) | |
| Caleb Coley; CB | Recruit ratings: Rivals: 247Sports: ESPN: | | | | |
| Malik Spencer; S | Buford, GA | Buford | 6 ft 2 in (1.88 m) | 193 lb (88 kg) | |
| Malik Spencer; S | Recruit ratings: Rivals: 247Sports: ESPN: | | | | |
| Quavian Carter; S | Leesburg, GA | Lee County | 6 ft 4 in (1.93 m) | 200 lb (91 kg) | |
| Quavian Carter; S | Recruit ratings: Rivals: 247Sports: ESPN: | | | | |
| Gavin Broscious; OL | Goodyear, AZ | Desert Edge | 6 ft 5 in (1.96 m) | 305 lb (138 kg) | |
| Gavin Broscious; OL | Recruit ratings: Rivals: 247Sports: ESPN: | | | | |
| Tyrell Henry; WR | Roseville, MI | Roseville | 6 ft 1 in (1.85 m) | 170 lb (77 kg) | |
| Tyrell Henry; WR | Recruit ratings: Rivals: 247Sports: ESPN: | | | | |
| Jaron Glover; WR | Sarasota, FL | Riverview | 6 ft 3 in (1.91 m) | 95 lb (43 kg) | |
| Jaron Glover; WR | Recruit ratings: Rivals: 247Sports: ESPN: | | | | |
| Ade Willie; CB | Bradenton, FL | IMG Academy | 6 ft 2 in (1.88 m) | 185 lb (84 kg) | |
| Ade Willie; CB | Recruit ratings: Rivals: 247Sports: ESPN: | | | | |
| Malcolm Jones; S | Leesburg, GA | Lee County | 6 ft 1 in (1.85 m) | 185 lb (84 kg) | |
| Malcolm Jones; S | Recruit ratings: Rivals: 247Sports: ESPN: | | | | |
| James Schott; DE | Greenwood, IN | Center Grove | 6 ft 4 in (1.93 m) | 215 lb (98 kg) | |
| James Schott; DE | Recruit ratings: Rivals: 247Sports: ESPN: | | | | |
| Ashton Lepo; OT | Grand Haven, MI | Grand Haven | 6 ft 8 in (2.03 m) | 280 lb (130 kg) | |
| Ashton Lepo; OT | Recruit ratings: Rivals: 247Sports: ESPN: | | | | |
| Braden Miller; OT | Aurora, CO | Eaglecrest | 6 ft 7 in (2.01 m) | 290 lb (130 kg) | |
| Braden Miller; OT | Recruit ratings: Rivals: 247Sports: ESPN: | | | | |
| Michael Masunas; TE | Chandler, AZ | Hamilton | 6 ft 5 in (1.96 m) | 235 lb (107 kg) | |
| Michael Masunas; TE | Recruit ratings: Rivals: 247Sports: ESPN: | | | | |
| Kristian Phillips; OL | Conyers, GA | Salem | 6 ft 6 in (1.98 m) | 340 lb (150 kg) | |
| Kristian Phillips; OL | Recruit ratings: Rivals: 247Sports: ESPN: | | | | |
| Zion Young; DL | Atlanta, GA | Westlake | 6 ft 5 in (1.96 m) | 230 lb (100 kg) | |
| Zion Young; DL | Recruit ratings: Rivals: 247Sports: ESPN: | | | | |
| Jack Stone; K | Dallas, TX | Highland Park | 6 ft 0 in (1.83 m) | 186 lb (84 kg) | |
| Jack Stone; K | Recruit ratings: Rivals: 247Sports: ESPN: | | | | |
Overall recruit ranking:
Note: In many cases, Scout, Rivals, 247Sports, On3, and ESPN may conflict in their listings of height and weight.; In these cases, the average was taken. ESPN grades are on a 100-point scale.; Sources: "Scout". Scout.; "Scout.com Team Recruiting Rankings". Scout.; "2022 Team Ranking". Rivals.com.

== Personnel ==
=== Players ===
2022 Michigan State Spartans football team roster
Players
Coaches
Offense

| Pos. | # | Name | Class |
|---|---|---|---|
| WR | 0 | Keon Coleman | So |
| WR | 1 | Jayden Reed | Sr |
| RB | 2 | Harold Joiner | Sr |
| RB | 3 | Jarek Broussard | Sr |
| WR | 3 | Terry Lockett Jr | Jr |
| WR | 4 | Germie Bernard | Fr |
| QB | 5 | Hamp Fay | Fr |
| TE | 6 | Maliq Carr | So |
| WR | 7 | Antonio Gates | Fr |
| RB | 8 | Jalen Berger | So |
| TE | 9 | Daniel Barker | 5th |
| QB | 10 | Payton Thorne | Jr |
| WR | 11 | Tyrell Henry | Fr |
| QB | 12 | Katin Houser | Fr |
| WR | 13 | Sebastian Brown | So |
| QB | 14 | Noah Kim | So |
| WR | 15 | Jaron Glover | Fr |
| WR | 16 | Christian Fitzpatrick | So |
| WR | 17 | Tre Mosley | Jr |
| QB | 18 | Andrew Schorfhaar | So |
| RB | 21 | Davion Primm | Fr |
| RB | 22 | Jordon Simmons | Jr |
| RB | 24 | Elijah Collins | Sr |
| WR | 25 | Isiah Henderson | So |
| TE | 40 | Powers Warren | Sr |
| TE | 47 | Jackson Morse | Jr |
| OL | 50 | Brian Greene | Sr |
| OT | 53 | Brandon Baldwin | So |
| G | 56 | Matt Carrick | Sr |
| OL | 58 | Spencer Brown | Jr |
| C | 59 | Nick Samac | Sr |
| OL | 63 | Jacob Lafave | So |
| OT | 64 | Braden Miller | Fr |
| OT | 66 | Ashton Lepo | Fr |
| OL | 67 | JD Duplain | Sr |
| G | 68 | Gavin Broscious | Fr |
| OT | 69 | Jacob Merritt | Fr |
| OL | 70 | Kevin Wigenton | Fr |
| G | 71 | Kristian Phillips | Fr |
| G | 72 | Dallas Fincher | So |
| OL | 74 | Geno VanDeMark | Fr |
| OT | 75 | Ben Nelson | Fr |
| OT | 76 | Andy Hartman | Fr |
| OL | 77 | Ethan Boyd | Fr |
| OT | 79 | Jarrett Horst | Sr |
| WR | 80 | Zach Gillespie | So |
| TE | 81 | Michael Masunas | Fr |
| WR | 82 | Nick Hunter | Jr |
| WR | 83 | Montorie Foster | Jr |
| WR | 84 | Tyler Vroman | Fr |
| WR | 85 | Cade McDonald | Jr |
| WR | 86 | Aubrey Dawkins | So |
| TE | 87 | Jack Nickel | Fr |
| WR | 89 | Alex Waters | Fr |
| TE/K | 92 | Evan Morris | Jr |
| TE | 97 | Tyler Hunt |

Defense

| Pos. | # | Name | Class |
|---|---|---|---|
| CB | 0 | Charles Brantley | So |
| S | 1 | Jaden Mangham | Fr |
| EDGE | 2 | Khris Bogle | Sr |
| S | 3 | Xavier Henderson | Sr |
| LB | 4 | Jacoby Windmon (S) | Sr |
| DE | 5 | Michael Fletcher | Jr |
| CB | 6 | Ameer Speed | Sr |
| LB | 7 | Aaron Brule | Sr |
| DT | 8 | Simeon Barrow | So |
| CB | 9 | Ronald Williams | Sr |
| LB | 10 | Ma'a Gaotetote | So |
| LB | 11 | Quavian Carter | Fr |
| CB | 12 | Chester Kimbrough | Sr |
| LB | 13 | Ben VanSumeren | Sr |
| CB | 14 | Khary Crump (S) | So |
| S | 15 | Angelo Grose (S) | Jr |
| DE | 17 | Chase Carter | Fr |
| DE | 18 | Zion Young (S) | Fr |
| LB | 19 | Itayvion Brown (S) | So |
| CB | 20 | Ade Willie | Fr |
| DB | 21 | Dillon Tatum | Fr |
| LB | 23 | Darius Snow (injured) | Jr |
| CB | 24 | Malcolm Jones (S) | Fr |
| DE | 26 | Brandon Wright (S) | Sr |
| LB | 27 | Cal Haladay | So |
| S | 28 | Tate Hallock | Jr |
| CB | 29 | Marquis Lowery | So |
| CB | 30 | Justin White (S) | Jr |
| LB | 31 | Kobe Myers | So |
| DE | 32 | James Schott | Fr |
| CB | 33 | Kendell Brooks | Sr |
| S | 34 | Khalil Majeed | Fr |
| LB | 35 | Sam Edwards | So |
| CB | 37 | Caleb Coley | Fr |
| DB | 39 | Joey Silveri | Fr |
| S | 40 | AJ Kirk | Fr |
| DT | 41 | Derrick Harmon | Fr |
| LB | 42 | Carson Casteel | Fr |
| S | 43 | Malik Spencer | Fr |
| DE | 47 | Jeff Pietroski | Jr |
| LB | 56 | Jay Coyne | Fr |
| DT | 57 | Evan Brunning | Jr |
| DT | 64 | Jacob Slade | Sr |
| DT | 91 | Alex VanSumeren | Fr |
| DT | 94 | Dashaun Mallory | Sr |
| DR | 97 | Maverick Hansen | Jr |
| DE | 98 | Avery Dunn | So |
| DT | 99 | Jalen Hunt | Jr |

Special teams

| Pos. | # | Name | Class |
|---|---|---|---|
| K | 19 | Jack Stone | Fr |
| LS | 31 | Hank Pepper | So |
| LS | 92 | Michael Donovan | Fr |
| P | 96 | Ryan Eckley | Fr |
| K | 98 | Stephen Rusnak | So |
| P | 99 | Bryce Baringer | Sr |

Head coach

- Mel Tucker

Coordinators/assistant coaches

- Chris Kapilovic (assistant head coach/offensive line/run game coordinator)
- Scottie Hazelton (defensive coordinator)
- Jay Johnson (offensive coordinator/quarterbacks)
- Harlon Barnett (Secondary)
- Marco Coleman (defensive line/run game coordinator)
- Ross Els (special teams coordinator)
- Ted Gilmore (tight ends)
- Courtney Hawkins (wide receivers)
- Efrem Reed (running backs)
- Brandon Jordan (Pass Rush Specialist)

Legend

- (C) Team captain
- (S) Suspended
- (I) Ineligible
- Injured
- Redshirt

Roster
Last update: November 28, 2022

=== Coaching staff ===
| Name | Position | Season |
|---|---|---|
| Mel Tucker | Head coach | 3rd |
| Chris Kapilovic | Assistant head coach/offensive line/run game coordinator | 3rd |
| Jay Johnson | Offensive coordinator/quarterbacks | 3rd |
| Scottie Hazelton | Defensive coordinator | 3rd |
| Ted Gilmore | Tight ends | 3rd |
| Courtney Hawkins | Wide receivers | 3rd |
| Harlon Barnett | Secondary | 14th |
| Ross Els | Special Teams/linebackers | 3rd |
| Effrem Reed | Running backs | 1st |
| Marco Coleman | Defensive line | 1st |
| Brandon Jordan | Pass rush specialist | 1st |

== Schedule ==
On January 12, the Big Ten released the full, revised schedules for the conference.

| Date | Time | Opponent | Rank | Site | TV | Result | Attendance |
|---|---|---|---|---|---|---|---|
| September 2 | 7:00 p.m. | Western Michigan* | No. 15 | Spartan Stadium; East Lansing, MI | ESPN2 | W 35–13 (vacated) | 73,928 |
| September 10 | 4:00 p.m. | Akron* | No. 14 | Spartan Stadium; East Lansing, MI | BTN | W 52–0 (vacated) | 70,079 |
| September 17 | 7:30 p.m. | at Washington* | No. 11 | Husky Stadium; Seattle, WA | ABC | L 28–39 | 68,161 |
| September 24 | 3:30 p.m. | Minnesota | | Spartan Stadium; East Lansing, MI | BTN | L 7–34 | 74,587 |
| October 1 | 3:30 p.m. | at Maryland | | Maryland Stadium; College Park, MD | FS1 | L 13–27 | 30,559 |
| October 8 | 4:00 p.m. | No. 3 Ohio State | | Spartan Stadium; East Lansing, MI | ABC | L 20–49 | 72,809 |
| October 15 | 4:00 p.m. | Wisconsin^{†} | | Spartan Stadium; East Lansing, MI | FOX | W 34–28 ^{2OT} (vacated) | 72,526 |
| October 29 | 7:30 p.m. | at No. 4 Michigan | | Michigan Stadium; Ann Arbor, MI (rivalry) | ABC | L 7–29 | 111,083 |
| November 5 | 3:30 p.m. | at No. 16 Illinois | | Memorial Stadium; Champaign, IL | BTN | W 23–15 (vacated) | 56,092 |
| November 12 | 12:00 p.m. | Rutgers | | Spartan Stadium; East Lansing, MI | BTN | W 27–21 (vacated) | 63,267 |
| November 19 | 12:00 p.m. | Indiana | | Spartan Stadium; East Lansing, MI (rivalry) | BTN | L 31–39 ^{2OT} | 56,136 |
| November 26 | 4:00 p.m. | at No. 11 Penn State | | Beaver Stadium; University Park, PA (rivalry) | FS1 | L 16–35 | 105,154 |
*Non-conference game; ^{†}Homecoming; Rankings from AP Poll (and CFP Rankings, after November 1) - Released prior to game; All times are in Eastern time

== Rankings ==
Ranking movements Legend: ██ Increase in ranking ██ Decrease in ranking — = Not ranked RV = Received votes
| | Week | | | | | | | | | | | | | | | |
| Poll | Pre | 1 | 2 | 3 | 4 | 5 | 6 | 7 | 8 | 9 | 10 | 11 | 12 | 13 | 14 | Final |
|---|---|---|---|---|---|---|---|---|---|---|---|---|---|---|---|---|
| AP | 15 | 14 | 11 | RV | — | — | — | — | — | — | — | — | — | — | — | — |
| Coaches | 14 | 11 | 9 | 21 | RV | — | — | — | — | — | — | — | — | — | — | — |
| CFP | Not released | | | | | | | | | — | — | — | — | — | — | Not released |

== Game summaries ==
=== Western Michigan ===
Week One: Western Michigan at No. 15 Michigan State – Game summary

| Quarter | 1 | 2 | 3 | 4 | Total |
|---|---|---|---|---|---|
| Western Michigan | 3 | 0 | 10 | 0 | 13 |
| No. 15 Michigan State | 7 | 14 | 0 | 14 | 35 |

at Spartan Stadium • East Lansing, MI

- Date: September 2, 2022
- Game time: 7:04 p.m.
- Game weather: 82 °F (28 °C), Sunny
- Game attendance: 73,928
- Referee: Kole Knueppel
- TV announcers (ESPN2): Roy Philpott (play-by-play), Andre Ware (analyst), and Paul Carcaterra (sideline reporter)

Game information

First Quarter

- (06:31) WMU FG: Palmer Domschke 27-yard field goal
  WMU 3–0; 10 plays, 66 yards, 4:57
- (04:37) MSU TD: Germie Bernard 44-yard pass from Payton Thorne (Jack Stone kick)
  MSU 7–3; 6 plays, 75 yards, 01:54

Second Quarter

- (14:55) MSU TD: Daniel Barker 13-yard pass from Payton Thorne (Jack Stone kick)
  MSU 14–3; 7 plays 45 yards, 2:21
- (12:26) MSU TD: Keon Coleman 41-yard pass from Payton Thorne (Jack Stone kick)
  MSU 21–3; 2 plays, 50 yards, 0:44

Third Quarter

- (08:20) WMU TD: Sean Tyler 4-yard run (Palmer Doschke kick)
  MSU 21–10; 7 plays, 67 yards, 3:43
- (00:49) WMU FG: Palmer Domschke 42-yard field goal
  MSU 21–13; 10 plays, 48 yards, 4:40

Fourth Quarter

- (06:28) MSU TD: Jalen Berger 1-yard run (Jack Stone kick)
  MSU 28–13; 8 plays, 91 yards, 3:48
- (04:07) MSU TD: Tre Mosley 43-yard pass from Payton Thorne (Jack Stone kick)
  MSU 35–13; 1 play, 43 yards, 0:06

Passing

- WMU – Jack Salopek: 21/36, 193 yards
- MSU – Payton Thorne: 12/24, 233 yards, 4 TD, 1 INT

Rushing

- WMU – Sean Taylor: 13 carries, 80 yards, 1 TD
- MSU – Jalen Berger: 16 carries, 120 yards, 1 TD

Receiving

- WMU – Jehlani Galloway: 4 receptions, 70 yards
- MSU – Keon Coleman: 4 receptions, 84 yards, 1 TD

In the first game of the season, the Spartans, ranked No. 15 (AP) in the country, faced Western Michigan at Spartan Stadium. The game marked the first time that MSU starting quarterback Payton Thorne would face his father, Jeff Thorne, the new offensive coordinator for the Broncos.

Michigan State got the ball first, but went three-and-out and WMU also followed with a punt. The Spartans were forced to punt again on the ensuing possession. The Broncos moved into MSU territory on their next possession before stalling at the Spartans 10 yard line and settling for a field goal to give WMU the early 3–0 lead. MSU answered quickly, moving into Bronco territory in four plays before freshman wide receiver Germie Bernard caught a 44-yard touchdown pass from Payton Thorne to give the Spartans the 7–3 lead. The MSU defensed forced a three-and-out on the next possession and the Spartans again moved into WMU territory. Early in the second quarter, Thorne threw his second touchdown pass of the game, a one-handed grab by Illinois tight end transfer Daniel Barker to move the MSU lead to 14–3. Following another punt by Western Michigan, the Spartans scored on a two-play drive that ended with Thorne's third touchdown pass of the season, this one to Keon Coleman. Trailing 21–3, The Broncos moved deep into MSU territory, but a sack and forced fumble by Jacoby Windmon was recovered by MSU cornerback Charles Kimbrough to end the WMU drive. Following a punt by the Spartans, the Broncos again moved into MSU territory, but a fumble by WMU running back Sean Tyler was recovered by Simeon Barrow to again end the drive. After moving to the 26 yard line, Thorne was intercepted and WMU took over with 44 seconds left in the half. Western Michigan chose to run out the clock and the game went to halftime with MSU up 21–3.

Following a WMU punt to start the third quarter, the Spartans moved to midfield before running Jalen Berger fumbled the ball and the Broncos recovered to end the drive. A 45-yard run by WMU's Tyler set the Broncos up at the MSU four and Tyler capped the drive with a rushing touchdown to narrow MSU's lead to 21–10. The Spartans responded by moving to the WMU 27, but the drive stalled and the Spartans were forced to attempt a field goal. The 44-yard attempt was no good and the Broncos took over at the 27. They again moved into Spartan territory, but were forced to settle for a 42-yard field goal to narrow the lead to eight points. As the fourth quarter began, MSU was forced to punt again. Following a WMU punt, the Spartans turned to the run game, led by Berger. Four straight rushes by Berger left MSU at WMU's one yard line and a fifth rush by Berger on fourth down put MSU in the end zone for the first in the second half. Trailing 28–12, WMU went for it on fourth down with under five minutes remaining, but were unsuccessful, setting the Spartans up at the Bronco 43. On the first play of the drive, Thorne threw his fourth touchdown on the day, this to Tre Mosley, to push MSU's lead to 35–13 with just over four minutes left in the game. The Broncos could not get out of their own end on the ensuing drive and were forced to punt which allowed MSU to runout the clock. The 35–13 win moved MSU to 1–0 on the season.

Payton Thorne threw four touchdowns in the win, but only completed 50% of his passes. Jalen Berger rushed for 120 of MSU's 197 yards on the ground in the win. MSU defensive end Jacoby Windmon had four sacks in the game and was named the Big Ten Conference Defensive Player of the Week. He was named the Walter Camp National Defensive Played of the Week. He was also named national defensive player of the week by Reese's Senior Bowl.

=== Akron ===
Week Two: Akron at No. 14 Michigan State – Game summary

| Quarter | 1 | 2 | 3 | 4 | Total |
|---|---|---|---|---|---|
| Akron | 0 | 0 | 0 | 0 | 0 |
| No. 14 Michigan State | 14 | 10 | 28 | 0 | 52 |

at Spartan Stadium • East Lansing, MI

- Date: September 10, 2022
- Game time: 4:05 p.m.
- Game weather: 85 °F (29 °C), Cloudy, Wind: SW 7 mph (11 km/h)
- Game attendance: 70,079
- Referee: Brian Banks
- TV announcers (BTN): Chris Vosters (play-by-play), Matt Millen (analyst), and Audrey Dahlgren (sideline reporter)

Game information

First Quarter

- (08:29) MSU TD: Jarek Broussard 1-yard run (Jack Stone kick)
  MSU 7–0; 6 plays, 59 yards, 2:13
- (02:26) MSU TD: Jalen Berger 1-yard run (Jack Stone kick)
  MSU 14–0; 8 plays, 45 yards, 2:37

Second Quarter

- (02:16) MSU TD: Jalen Berger 1-yard run (Jack Stone kick)
  MSU 21–0; 8 plays, 56 yards, 2:58
- (00:01) MSU FG: Jack Stone 43-yard field goal
  MSU 24–0; 8 plays, 68 yards 00:56

Third Quarter

- (13:26) MSU TD: Tre Mosley 16-yard pass from Noah Kim (Jack Stone kick)
  MSU 31–0; 2 plays, 20 yards, 0:37
- (07:58) MSU TD: Jarek Broussard 2-yard run (Jack Stone kick)
  MSU 38–0; 9 plays, 69 yards, 3:52
- (03:59) MSU TD Jalen Berger 2-yard run (Jack Stone kick)
  MSU 45–0; 7 plays, 60 yards, 3;01
- (00:21) MSU TD: Elijah Collins 10-yard run (Jack Stone kick)
  MSU 52–0; 6 plays, 37 yard, 2:28

Passing

- AKR – DJ Irons: 9/13, 123 yards
- MSU – Payton Thorne: 18/28, 212 yards, 2 INT

Rushing

- AKR – DJ Irons: 7 carries, 30 yards
- MSU – Jalen Berger: 17 carries, 107 yards, 3 TD

Receiving

- AKR – George Daniel: 4 receptions, 44 yards
- MSU – Jayden Reed: 6 receptions, 76 yards

In game two of the season, the Spartans, now ranked No. 14 (AP), welcomed Akron to Spartan Stadium, marking the teams' first game against each other since 1914. The Spartans were without top defenders linebacker Darius Snow, who was injured in the prior game and will miss the rest of the season, and safety Xavier Henderson.

The Spartans won the toss and deferred to the second half, so Akron received the ball first. The Zips were able to move into MSU territory fairly easily as mobile quarterback DJ Irons moved through the Spartan defense. However, Irons's pass to TJ Banks was fumbled by Banks at the MSU 20 and Cal Haladay picked up the ball and returned it 21 yards to the MSU 41. Jalen Berger gouged the Zips defense and Payton Thorne hit Jayden Reed to put the ball at the Akron seven. Jarek Broussard took over at running back and moved the ball to the on and then into the end zone to give MSU the early 7–0 lead. The teams exchanged punts on their next possessions before the Zips turned it over again on forced fumble by Jacoby Windmon. Maverick Hansen recovered the ball at the Akron 45. Broussard took over the majority of the possession, but Berger came in with the ball at the and scored his first touchdown of the day as the Spartans went ahead 14–0. Following an Akron punt early in the second quarter, Thorne was intercepted after being hit while throwing the ball and the Spartans turned the ball over to the Zips at the Akron 45. The MSU defense was able to keep the Zips from scoring and forced a punt. On the ensuing possession, the Spartans moved to midfield, but came up short on a fourth down try turning the ball over on downs. With Akron quarterback Irons injured and out of the game, the Zips still took over in MSU territory. However, another fumble, the third on the day was recovered at the MSU 40 giving the ball back to the Spartans. The Spartans again moved the Akron one and Berger scored his second touchdown of the game to move the lead to 21–0. Following a punt by the Zips, the Spartans took over with 57 second left in the half. As time ran out, Jack Stone kicked his first field goal from 43 yards to give MSU the 24–0 halftime lead.

With the Spartans starting the half with the ball, Thorne was intercepted on the first play from scrimmage on a deep pass that resulted with Akron taking over at their own 30. Two plays later, Haladay sacked Zips' backup quarterback Jeff Undercuffer and forced a fumble that was recovered by MSU at the Akron 20. It was the fourth turnover of the game, all fumbles, by Akron. Thorne, who was shaken up when hit while throwing the interception on the previous drive, was replaced by Noah Kim. On the second play of the drive, Kim threw a 16-yard touchdown pass to Tre Mosely to give MSU a 31–0 lead. Following a punt by Akron, Thorne returned to the game and MSU turned to the running game as Berger and Broussard moved MSU to the Akron two before Broussard scored his second touchdown of the game further extending the Spartan lead. Following another Akron punt, the MSU run game again moved the ball into Zips' territory and Berger scored his third touchdown of the game and giving MSU a 45–0. An Elijah Collins rushing touchdown on the next drive for the Spartans finished the scoring. With backups in for the fourth quarter, no team could score as MSU won 52–0. The win moved MSU to 2–0 on the season.

Payton Thorne struggled in the game, throwing two interceptions, but did complete 64% of his passes. Jalen Berger again rushed for over 100 yards while Jarek Broussard added 81 yards as the Spartans scored from the ground on six of their seven touchdowns. For the second consecutive week, Jacoby Windmon was named Big Ten Defensive Player of the Week after notching 1.5 sacks and three forced fumbles.

=== Washington ===
Week Three: No. 11 Michigan State at Washington – Game summary

| Quarter | 1 | 2 | 3 | 4 | Total |
|---|---|---|---|---|---|
| No. 11 Michigan State | 0 | 8 | 6 | 14 | 28 |
| Washington | 9 | 20 | 7 | 3 | 39 |

at Husky Stadium • Seattle, WA

- Date: September 17, 2022
- Game time: 7:44 p.m.
- Game weather: 62 °F (17 °C), Sunny, Wind: N 9 mph (14 km/h)
- Game attendance: 68,161
- Referee: Jerry McGinn
- TV announcers (ABC): Mark Jones (play-by-play), Robert Griffin III (analyst), and Quint Kessenich (sideline reporter)

Game information

First Quarter

- (11:12) WASH TD: Ja'Lynn Polk 8-yard pass from Michael Penix Jr. (Peyton Henry kick)
  WASH 7–0; 7 plays, 77 yards, 3:43
- (01:07) WASH Safety
  WASH 9–0

Second Quarter

- (13:49) WASH TD: Cameron Davis 1-yard run (Peyton Henry kick)
  WASH 16–0;6 plays, 50 yards, 2:18
- (08:32) WASH TD: Wayne Taulapapa 19-yard pass from Michael Penix Jr. (kick failed)
  WASH 22–0; 4 plays, 60 yards, 1:09
- (01:30) MSU TD: Keon Coleman 7-yard pass from Payton Thorne (Keon Coleman pass from Payton Thorne)
  WASH 22–8; 15 plays, 75 yards, 7:02
- (00:04) WASH TD: Ja'Lynn Polk 17-yard pass from Michael Penix Jr. (Peyton Henry kick)
  WASH 29–8; 8 plays, 65 yards, 1:18

Third Quarter

- (11:59) MSU TD: Tre Mosley 26-yard pass from Payton Thorne (two-point conversion failed)
  WASH 29–14; 8 plays, 75 yards, 3:01
- (11:02) WASH TD: Ja'Lynn Polk 53-yard pass from Michael Penix Jr. (Peyton Henry kick)
  WASH 36–14; 4 plays, 73 yards, 0:57

Fourth Quarter

- (09:19) WASH FG: Peyton Henry 26-yard field goal
  WASH 39–14; 4 plays, 2 yards, 0:56
- (06:51) MSU TD: Elijah Collins 1-yard run (two-point conversion failed)
  WASH 39–20; 8 plays, 70 yards, 2:28
- (05:17) MSU TD: Keon Coleman 33-yard pass from Payton Thorne (Keon Coleman pass from Payton Thorne)
  WASH 39–28; 4 plays 75 yards, 1:07

Passing

- MSU – Payton Thorne: 30/42, 323 yards, 3 TD, 1 INT
- WASH – Michael Penix Jr.: 24/40, 397 yards, 4 TD

Rushing

- MSU – Jalen Berger: 13 carries, 27 yards
- WASH – Cameron Davis: 17 carries, 69 yards, 1 TD

Receiving

- MSU – Keon Coleman: 9 receptions, 116 yards, 2 TD
- WASH – Ja'Lynn Polk: 6 receptions, 153yard, 3 TD

The newly ranked No. 11 (AP) Spartans traveled to face Washington for the team's first road game of the season. Washington's quarterback Michael Penix Jr., a former player for Indiana, had faced the Spartans twice previously.

Washington immediately took control of the game driving quickly into Spartan territory and scored an eight-yard touchdown pass by Penix to give the Huskies the early 7–0 lead. MSU managed one first down on the next possession before punting. The Huskies again moved quickly into MSU territory, but were stuffed on fourth down from the one giving MSU the ball back at their own two. However, on the first play from scrimmage, Jarek Broussard slipped coming out of the backfield and did not make it out of the end zone resulting in a safety and a 9–0 Washington lead. The ensuing free kick went out of bounds and the Huskies quickly scored again to move the lead 16–0 early in the second quarter. Following another punt by the Spartans, the Huskies continued to gash the Spartan secondary and Penix threw his second touchdown pass of the game to balloon the lead to 22–0. The Spartans embarked on a 15-play, 75-yard drive including two fourth down conversions and capped off by Payton Thorne's touchdown pass to Keon Coleman. The two-point conversion, also from Thorne to Coleman drew the Spartans within 14. Needing a stop to keep the game in question with 1:22 left in the half, the Spartans defense continued its poor play and Penix quickly threw his third touchdown of the game as the lead moved to 29–8 at the half.

Getting the ball first in the third quarter, Thorne hit Tre Mosley for a 26-yard touchdown pass. With a failed two-point conversion, the lead was reduced to 29–14. The MSU defense was exploited again by Penix on the ensuing possession and he threw his fourth touchdown pass of the game as the lead moved to 36–14 with just under 11 minutes left in the third quarter. MSU was forced to punt following a sack of Thorne on a third-and-20 play and the Huskies took over with 4:27 left in the quarter. For the first time in the game, the Spartans forced a Washington punt albeit with the Huskies choosing to take time off the clock more than in their previous possessions. As the game moved to the fourth quarter, the Spartans chose to go for it on fourth down from their own 24 and failed. The Huskies moved to the MSU one, but turned the ball over on downs. Payton Thorne was intercepted on the next play and the Huskies added a field goal to pus the lead to 25. An Elijah Collins rushing touchdown narrowed the lead to 39–20 when the two-point conversion failed. A failed onside kick resulted in a Huskies' punt. Thorne threw his third touchdown pass of the game, his second to Keon Coleman, but the two-point conversion failed. With 5:17 remaining in the game and trailing 39–28, the Spartans again attempted an onside kick, but the Huskies recovered. Following a Washington punt, the Spartans were able to move to midfield, but turned the ball over on downs with less than three minutes left in the game. The Huskies were successfully able to run out the clock to win the game 39–28.

The Spartan pass defense, the worst in FBS the prior season, allowed 397 yards in the game as they were gashed time and again by Michael Penix Jr. Payton Thorne played well in the defeat, throwing for 323 yards and three touchdowns. The Spartan rush game was a disaster, only gaining 42 yards in the game. The loss dropped the Spartans to 2–1 on the season.

=== Minnesota ===
Week Four: Minnesota at Michigan State – Game summary

| Quarter | 1 | 2 | 3 | 4 | Total |
|---|---|---|---|---|---|
| Minnesota | 14 | 3 | 7 | 10 | 34 |
| Michigan State | 0 | 0 | 0 | 7 | 7 |

at Spartan Stadium • East Lansing, MI

- Date: September 24, 2022
- Game time: 3:40 p.m.
- Game weather: 61 °F (16 °C), Cloudy, Wind: S 3 mph (4.8 km/h)
- Game attendance: 74,587
- Referee: Jeffrey Servinski
- TV announcers (BTN): Brandon Gaudin (play-by-play), Joshua Perry (analyst), and Rick Pizzo (sideline reporter)

Game information

First Quarter

- (09:50) MINN TD: Mohamed Ibrahim 2-yard run (Matthew Trickett kick)
  MINN 7–0; 10 plays, 75 yards, 5:10
- (02:57) MINN TD: Daniel Jackson 23-yard pass from Tanner Morgan (Matthew Trickett kick)
  NINN 14–0; 9 plays, 77 yards, 5:01

Second Quarter

- (10:14) MINN FG: Matthew Trickett 26-yard field goal
  MINN 17–0; 12 plays, 66 yards, 6:15

Third Quarter

- (03:26) MINN TD: Nick Kallerup 6-yard pass from Tanner Mortgan
  MINN 24–0; 12 plays, 90 yards, 6:53

Fourth Quarter

- (14L08) MINN TD: Daniel Jackson 4-yard pass from Tanner Morgan (Matthew Trickett kick)
  MINN 31–0; 6 plays, 28 yards, 3:44
- (01:48) MINN FG: Matthew Trickett 22-yard field goal
  MINN 34–0; 15 plays, 76 yards, 10:37
- (00:17) MSU TD: Germie Bernard 27-yard pass from Noah Kim (Jack Stone kick)
  MINN 34–7; 8 plays 75 yards, 1:31

Passing

- MINN – Tanner Morgan: 23/26, 268 yards, 3 TD
- MSU – Payton Thorne: 17/24, 132 yards, 2 INT

Rushing

- MINN – Mohamed Ibrahim: 22 carries, 110 yards, 1 TD
- MSU – Jarek Broussard: 6 carries, 23 yards

Receiving

- MINN – Michael Brown-Stephens: 6 receptions, 73 yards
- MSU – Cade McDonald: 3 receptions, 31yards,

Following the humbling loss to the Huskies, the Spartans dropped out of the AP poll while remaining ranked at No. 21 in the coaches poll. They returned home to face Minnesota in the first conference game of the season.

Once again, the Spartan defense was decimated by the opponent as the Gophers scored on their first possession, easily moving down the field to take a 7–0 lead. Following a three-and-out for MSU, the Gophers embarked on a nine-play drive as they again moved downfield easily and pushed the lead to 14–0. Following another three-and-out for the Spartan offense, the Gophers into MSU territory, but the drive stalled at the eight. A field goal by Minnesota moved the lead to 17–0 early in the second quarter. The Spartans got two first downs on their next drive, but Payton Thorne was intercepted on fourth down setting Minnesota up at their own 33. After moving to the Spartan 24, a fumble gave the Spartans the ball again with 4:41 left in the half. MSU was only able to move to midfield before being forced to punt again. Minnesota moved to midfield on the ensuing possession, but the clock ran out as they went to halftime with a 17-point lead.

Looking to get back into the game to start the third quarter, the Spartans moved into Gopher territory before Thorne fumbled the ball at the Minnesota six, ending the drive. Minnesota answered with a 12-play, 90-yard drive to move the lead to 24–0. On the next possession for the Spartans, Thorne was intercepted again setting Minnesota up at the MSU 28. As the game moved to the fourth quarter, the Gophers scored their fourth touchdown of the game moving their lead to 31 points with 14:08 left in the game. Following yet another punt by MSU, the Gophers went on a 15 play, 76-yard drive that took over 10 minutes before settling for a field goal to push the lead to 34–0 with 1:48 left in the game. MSU went to backups and the Spartans moved quickly downfield before Noah Kim hit Germie Bernard for a 27-yard touchdown to notch the first Spartan points of the game with 17 seconds left in the game. The Gophers ran out the clock to earn the 34–7 win.

MSU's defense was thrashed once again, allowing 268 yards through the air and 240 yards rushing. MSU's offense struggled mightily only gaining 240 yards compared to Minnesota's 508 yards. Minnesota dominated the game, running 74 plays to MSU's 45. The loss dropped the Spartans to 2–2 on the season and 0–1 in Big Ten play.

=== Maryland ===
Week Five: Michigan State at Maryland – Game summary

| Quarter | 1 | 2 | 3 | 4 | Total |
|---|---|---|---|---|---|
| Michigan State | 7 | 6 | 0 | 0 | 13 |
| Maryland | 14 | 7 | 3 | 3 | 27 |

at Maryland Stadium • College Park, MD

- Date: October 1, 2022
- Game time: 3:35 p.m.
- Game weather: 61 °F (16 °C), Cloudy, Wind: NE 8 mph (13 km/h)
- Game attendance: 30,559
- Referee: Larry Smith
- TV announcers (FS1): Noah Eagle (play-by-play) and Mark Helfrich (analyst)

Game information

First Quarter

- (09:15) MD TD: Antwain Littleton II 15-yard run (Chad Ryland kick)
  MD 7–0; 12 plays, 93 yards, 5:45
- (05:45) MSU TD: Elijah Collins 12-yard run (Ben Patton kick)
  Tied 7–7; 8 plays, 77 yards, 3:25
- (03:41) MD TD: Colby McDonald 2-yard run (Chad Ryland kick)
  MD 14–7; 5 plays, 85 yards, 2;01

Second Quarter

- (04:24) MSU TD: Jayden Reed 8-yard pass from Payton Thorne (conversion failed)
  MD 14–13; 12 plays, 85 yards, 5:53
- (00:42) MD TD: Rakim Jarrett 5-yard pass from Taulia Tagovailoa (Chad Ryland kick)
  MD 21–13; 13 plays 80 yards, 3:37

Third Quarter

- (08:26) MD FG: Chad Ryland 43-yard field goal
  MD 24–13; 11 plays 43 yards, 5:42

Fourth Quarter

- (07;54) MD FG: Chad Ryland 51-yard field goal
  MD 27–13; 6 plays, 19 yards, 3:00

Passing

- MD – Taulia Tagovailoa: 32/41, 314 yards, 1 TD
- MSU – Payton Thorne: 27/44, 221 yards, 1 TD

Rushing

- MD – Antwain Littleton II: 19 carries, 120 yards, 1 TD
- MSU – Elijah Collins: 5 carries, 36 yards

Receiving

- MSU – Jayden Reed: 7 receptions, 61 yards, 1 TD
- MD – Jeshaun Jones; 6 receptions, 60 yards

=== No. 3 Ohio State ===
Week Six: No. 3 Ohio State at Michigan State – Game summary

| Quarter | 1 | 2 | 3 | 4 | Total |
|---|---|---|---|---|---|
| No. 3 Ohio State | 14 | 21 | 14 | 0 | 49 |
| Michigan State | 7 | 6 | 0 | 7 | 20 |

at Spartan Stadium • East Lansing, MI

- Date: October 8, 2022
- Game time: 4:06 p.m.
- Game weather: 52 °F (11 °C), Cloudy, Wind: W 23 mph (37 km/h)
- Game attendance: 72,809
- Referee: Michael Cannon
- TV announcers (ABC): Chris Fowler (play-by-play), Kirk Herbstreit (analyst), and Holly Rowe (sideline reporter)

Game information

First Quarter

- (10:50) OSU TD: Marvin Harrison Jr. 19-yard pass from C. J. Stroud (Noah Ruggles kick)
  OSU 7–0; 7 plays, 80 yards, 2:20
- (08:32) MSU TD: Chuck Brantley 32-yard interception return (Jack Stone kick)
  Tied 7–7
- (07:11) OSU TD: Emeka Egbuka 69-yard pass from C. J. Stroud (Noah Ruggles kick)
  OSU 14–7; 3 plays, 75 yards, 1:21

Second Quarter

- (14:29) OSU TD: Julian Fleming 51-yard pass from C. J. Stroud (Noah Ruggles kick)
  OSU 21–7; 8 plays, 98 yards, 2:44
- (10:43) MSU TD: Jayden Reed 18-yard pass from Payton Thorne (conversion failed)
  OSU 21–13; 7 plays, 76 yards, 3:40
- (07:05) OSU TD: TreVeyon Henderson 1-yard run (Noah Ruggles kick)
  OSU 28–13;8 plays, 75 yards, 3:38
- (01:30) OSU TD: Marvin Harrison Jr. 28-yard from C. J. Stroud (Noah Ruggles kick)
  OSU 35–13; 9 plays, 91 yards, 4:36

Third Quarter

- (09:46) OSU TD: Marvin Harrison Jr. 19-yard from C. J. Stroud (Noah Ruggles kick)
  OSU 42–13; 9 plays, 96 yards, 5:03
- (03:04) OSU TD: Gee Scott Jr. 2-yard pass from C. J. Stroud (Noah Ruggles kick)
  OSU 49–13; 10 plays, 50 yards, 4:38

Fourth Quarter

- (5:40) MSU TD: Montorie Foster Jr. 25-yard pass from Noah Kim (Jack Stone kick)
  OSU 49–20; 8 plays, 80 yards, 3:10

Passing

- OSU – C. J. Stroud: 21/26, 361 yards, 6 TD, 1 INT
- MSU – Payton Thorne: 11/18, 113 yards, 1 TD, 1 INT

Rushing

- OSU – TreVeyon Henderson: 19 carries, 118 yards, 1 TD
- MSU – Elijah Collins: 2 carries, 9 yards

Receiving

- OSU – Emeka Egbuka: 5 receptions, 143 yards, 1 TD
- MSU – Jayden Reed: 4 receptions, 67 yards, 1 TD

=== Wisconsin ===
Week Seven: Wisconsin at Michigan State – Game summary

| Quarter | 1 | 2 | 3 | 4 | OT | 2OT | Total |
|---|---|---|---|---|---|---|---|
| Wisconsin | 7 | 7 | 0 | 7 | 7 | 0 | 28 |
| Michigan State | 7 | 0 | 7 | 7 | 7 | 6 | 34 |

at Spartan Stadium • East Lansing, MI

- Date: October 15, 2022
- Game time: 4:04 p.m.
- Game weather: 50 °F (10 °C), Partly cloudy, Wind: W 17 mph (27 km/h)
- Game attendance: 72,526
- Referee: Mark Kluczynski
- TV announcers (FOX): Tim Brando (play-by-play) and Spencer Tillman (analyst)

Game information

First Quarter

- (08:01) WIS TD: Braelon Allen 1-yard run (Nate Van Zelst kick)
  WIS 7–0; 11 plays, 63 yards, 5:27
- (00:20) MSU TD: Jalen Berger 12-yard run (Ben Patton kick)
  Tied 7–7; 2 plays, 12 yards, 0:12

Second Quarter

- (10:21) WIS TD: Braelon Allen 1-yard run (Nate Van Zelst kick)
  WIS 14–7; 9 plays, 85 yards, 4:59

Third Quarter

- (00:54) MSU TD: Elijah Collins 1-yard run (Ben Patton kick)
  Tied 14–14; 8 plays, 97 yards, 4:00

Fourth Quarter

- (07:23) MSU TD: Keon Coleman 27-yard pass from Payton Thorne (Ben Patton kick)
  MSU 21–14; 5 plays, 65 yards, 2:31
- (02:04) WIS TD: Keontez Lewis 3-yard from Graham Mertz (Nate Van Zelst kick)
  Tied 21–21; 9 plays, 52 yards, 5:11

Overtime

- (00:00) MSU TD: Keon Coleman 25-yard pass from Jayden Reed (Ben Patton kick)
  MSU 28–21; 1 play, 25 yards, 0:00
- (00:00) WIS TD: Chimere Dike 25-yard pass from Graham Mertz (Nate Van Zelst kick)
  28–28; 3 plays, 25 yards, 0:00

Second Overtime

- (0:00) MSU TD: Jayden Reed 27-yard pass from Payton Thorne
  MSU 34–28; 3 plays, 25 yards, 0:00

Passing

- WIS – Graham Mertz: 14/24, 131 yards, 2 TD, 1 INT
- MSU – Payton Thorne: 21/28, 265 yards, 2 TD

Rushing

- WIS – Braelon Allen: 29 carries, 123 yards, 2 TD
- MSU – Jalen Burger: 16 carries, 59 yards, 1 TD

Receiving

- WIS – Chimere Dike: 4 receptions, 45 yards, 1 TD
- MSU – Jayden Reed: 9 receptions, 117 yards, 1 TD

=== No. 4 Michigan ===
Week Eight: Michigan State at No. 4 Michigan – Game summary

| Quarter | 1 | 2 | 3 | 4 | Total |
|---|---|---|---|---|---|
| Michigan State | 7 | 0 | 0 | 0 | 7 |
| No. 4 Michigan | 3 | 10 | 6 | 10 | 29 |

at Michigan Stadium • Ann Arbor, MI

- Date: October 29, 2022
- Game time: 7:44 p.m.
- Game weather: 50 °F (10 °C), clear, Wind: E 5 mph (8.0 km/h)
- Game attendance: 111,083
- Referee: Reggie Smith
- TV announcers (ABC): Sean McDonough (play-by-play), Todd Blackledge (analyst), and Molly McGrath (sideline reporter)

Game information

First Quarter

- (02:20) MICH FG: Jake Moody 22-yard field goal
  MICH 3–0; 8 plays, 41 yards, 4:41
- (00:23) MSU TD: Keon Coleman 26-yard pass from Payton Thorne (Ben Patton kick)
  MSU 7–3; 6 plays, 75 yards, 1:57

Second Quarter

- (11:58) MICH TD: Blake Corum 2-yard pass from J. J. McCarthy (Jake Moody kick)
  MICH 10–7; 8 plays, 80 yards, 3:20
- (01:08) MICH FG: Jake Moody 25-yard field goal
  MICH 13–7; 15 plays, 86 yards, 6:23

Third Quarter

- (09:15) MICH FG: Jake Moody 39-yard field goal
  MICH 16–7; 11 plays, 57 yards, 5;39
- (03:58) MICH FG: Jake Moody 33-yard field goal
  MICH 19–7; 9 plays, 54 yards, 4:35

Fourth Quarter

- (14:45) MICH FG: Jake Moody 54-yard field goal
  MICH 22–7; 8 plays, 27 yards, 2:45
- (12:47) MICH TD: Blake Corum 4-yard run (Jake Moody kick)
  MICH 29–7; 2 plays, 8 yards, 0:39

Passing

- MSU – Payton Thorne: 17/30, 215 yards, 1 TD, 1 INT
- MICH – J. J. McCarthy: 15/25, 167 yards, 1 TD

Rushing

- MSU – Elijah Collins: 7 carries, 22 yards
- MICH – Blake Corum: 33 carries, 177 yards, 1 TD

Receiving

- MSU – Keon Coleman: 5 receptions, 155 yards, 1 TD
- MICH – Luke Schoonmaker: 5 receptions, 70 yards

=== No. 16 Illinois ===
Week Nine: Michigan State at No. 16 Illinois– Game summary

| Quarter | 1 | 2 | 3 | 4 | Total |
|---|---|---|---|---|---|
| Michigan State | 3 | 6 | 14 | 0 | 23 |
| No. 16 Illinois | 7 | 0 | 0 | 8 | 15 |

at Memorial Stadium • Champaign, IL

- Date: November 5, 2022
- Game time: 3:40 p.m.
- Game weather: 58 °F (14 °C), Cloudy, Wind: SW 30 mph (48 km/h)
- Game attendance: 56,092
- Referee: Larry Smith
- TV announcers (BTN): Cory Provus (play-by-play), Matt Millen (analyst), and Elise Menaker (sideline reporter)

Game information

First Quarter

- (08:03) ILL TD: Isaiah Williams 60-yard pass from Tommy Devito (Caleb Griffin kick)
  ILL 7–0; 2 plays, 59 yards, 0:42
- (01:36) MSU FG: Ben Patton 21-yard field goal
  ILL 7–3; 15 plays, 72 yards, 6:27

Second Quarter

- (10:21) MSU TD: Tre Mosley 1-yard pass from Payton Thorne (kick failed)
  MSU 9–7; 7 plays 61 yards, 3:48

Third Quarter

- (05:45) MSU TD: Jarek Broussard 11-yard run (Ben Patton kick)
  MSU 16–7; 6 plays, 29 yards, 3:48
- (05:27) MSU TD: Jayden Reed 16-yard pass from Payton Thorne (Ben Patton kick)
  MSU 23–7; 3 plays 41 yards, 1:22

Fourth Quarter

- (14:27) ILL TD: Isaiah Williams 7-yard pass from Tommy DeVito (Tip Redmon pass from Tommy DeVito)
  MSU 23–15; 8 plays, 56 yards, 3:25

Passing

- MSU – Payton Thorne: 19/29, 182 yards, 2 TD, 1 INT
- ILL – Tommy DeVito: 25/37, 288 yards, 2 TD

Rushing

- MSU – Jalen Berger: 15 carries, 84 yards
- ILL – Chase Brown: 33 carries, 140 yards

Receiving

- MSU – Jayden Reed: 5 receptions, 68 yards, 1 TD
- ILL – Isaiah Williams: 5 receptions, 98 yards, 2 TD

=== Rutgers ===
Week Ten: Rutgers at Michigan State – Game summary

| Quarter | 1 | 2 | 3 | 4 | Total |
|---|---|---|---|---|---|
| Rutgers | 0 | 7 | 7 | 7 | 21 |
| Michigan State | 7 | 7 | 7 | 6 | 27 |

at Spartan Stadium • East Lansing, MI

- Date: November 12, 2022
- Game time: 12:00 p.m.
- Game weather: 38 °F (3 °C), Cloudy, Wind: NW 6 mph (9.7 km/h)
- Game attendance: 63,267
- Referee: Ron Snodgrass
- TV announcers (BTN): Brandon Gaudin (play-by-play), Jake Butt (analyst), and Rick Pizzo (sideline reporter)

Game information

First Quarter

- (01:10) MSU TD: Daniel Barker 26-yard pass from Payton Thorne (Ben Patton kick)
  MSU 7–0; 9 plays, 72 yards, 3:03

Second Quarter

- (05:52) RUT TD: Aaron Young 18-yard pass from Gavin Wimsatt (Jude McAttamney kick)
  Tie 7–7; 9 plays, 96 yards, 3:50
- (02:05) MSU TD: Jalen Berger 2-yard run (Ben Patton kick)
  MSU 14–7; 10 plays, 73 yards, 3:43

Third Quarter

- (10:34) MSU TD: Jayden Reed 25-yard pass from Payton Thorne (Ben Patton kick)
  MSU 21–7; 5 plays, 73 yards, 2:14
- (01:30) RUT TD: Jonhnny Langan 1-yard run (Jude McAtamney kick)
  MSU 21–14; 9 plays, 69 yards, 3:23

Fourth Quarter

- (06:28) MSU FG: Ben Patton 34-yard field goal
  MSU 24–14; 7 plays, 39 yards, 2:49
- (03:22) MSU FG: Ben Patton 48-yard field goal
  MSU 27–14; 5 plays, -5 yards, 1:32
- (00:47) RUT TD: Shameen Jones 31-yard pass from Gavin Wimsatt (Jude McAtamney kick)
  MSU 27–21; 11 plays, 75 yards, 2:35

Passing

- RUT – Gavin Wimsatt: 20/34, 236 yards, 2 TD
- MSU – Payton Thorne: 19/35, 256 yards, 2 TD

Rushing

- RUT – Kyle Monangai: 24 carries, 164 yards
- MSU – Jalen Berger: 16 carries, 85 yards, 1 TD

Receiving

- RUT – Johnny Langan: 5 receptions, 73 yards
- MSU – Jayden Reed: 4 receptions, 90 yards, 1 TD

=== Indiana ===
Week Eleven: Indiana at Michigan State – Game summary

| Quarter | 1 | 2 | 3 | 4 | OT | 2OT | Total |
|---|---|---|---|---|---|---|---|
| Indiana | 7 | 0 | 17 | 7 | 0 | 8 | 39 |
| Michigan State | 3 | 21 | 7 | 0 | 0 | 0 | 31 |

at Spartan Stadium • East Lansing, MI

- Date: November 19, 2022
- Game time: 12:00 p.m.
- Game weather: 23 °F (−5 °C), Cloudy, Wind: SW 14 mph (23 km/h)
- Game attendance: 56,136
- Referee: Jerry McGinn
- TV announcers (BTN): Cory Provus (play-by-play), Matt Millen (analyst), and Elise Menaker (sideline reporter)

Game information

First Quarter

- (12:13) IND TD: Dexter Williams II 34-yard run (Charles Campbell kick)
  IND 7–0; 4 plays, 50 yards, 1:38
- (09:02) MSU FG: Ben Patton 19-yard field goal
  IND 7–3; 10 plays, 73 yards, 4:10

Second Quarter

- (11:50) MSU TD: Maliq Carr 5-yard pass from Payton Thorne (Ben Patton kick)
  MSU 10–7; 7 plays, 54 yards, 3:18
- (06:22) MSU TD: Elijah Collins 1-yard run (Ben Patton kick)
  MSU 17–7; 8 plays 69 yards, 3:19
- (00:51) MSU TD: Keon Coleman 2-yard pass from Payton Thorne (Ben Patton kick)
  MSU 24–7, 9 plays, 34 yards, 3:19

Third Quarter

- (13:40) IND TD: Shaun Shivers 79-yard run (Charles Campbell kick)
  MSU 24–14; 1 play, 79 yards, 0:13
- (06:17) MSU TD: Elijah Collins 31-yard run (Ben Patton kick)
  MSU 31–14; 6 plays, 69, yards, 3:26
- (06:04) IND TD: Shan Shivers 88-yard kickoff return (Charles Campbell kick)
  MSU 31–21
- (04:14) IND FG: Charles Campbell 40-yard field goal
  MSU 31–24; 4 plays 6 yards, 1:35

Fourth Quarter

- (12:59) IND TD: Josh Henderson 1-yard run (Charles Campbell kick)
  Tied 31–31; 9 plays 70 yards, 3:51

Second Overtime

- (00:00) IND TD: Shaun Shivers 1-yard run (A. J. Barner pass)
  IND 39–31; 2 plays, 25 yards, 0:00

Passing

- IND – Dexter Williams II: 2/7, 31 yards
- MSU – Payton Thorne: 27/42, 298 yards, 2 TD, 1 INT

Rushing

- IND – Shaun Shivers: 13 carries, 115 yards, 2 TD
- MSU – Jalen Berger: 21 carries, 125 yards

Receiving

- IND – A. J. Barner: 1 reception, 24 yards
- MSU – Keon Coleman: 8 receptions, 104 yards, 1 TD

=== No. 11 Penn State ===
Week Twelve: Michigan State at No. 11 Penn State – Game summary

| Quarter | 1 | 2 | 3 | 4 | Total |
|---|---|---|---|---|---|
| Michigan State | 0 | 3 | 7 | 6 | 16 |
| No. 11 Penn State | 7 | 7 | 7 | 14 | 35 |

at Beaver Stadium • University Park, PA

- Date: November 26, 2022
- Game time: 4:00 p.m.
- Game weather: 55 °F (13 °C), Cloudy, Wind: SW
- Game attendance: 105,154
- Referee: Larry Smith
- TV announcers (FS1): Noah Eagle (play-by-play) and Mark Helfrich (analyst)

Game information

First Quarter

- (00:40) PSU TD: Theo Johnson 11-yard pass from Sean Clifford (Jake Pinegar kick)
  PSU 7–0; 11 plays, 90 yards, 4:51

Second Quarter

- (11:22) PSU TD: Theo Johnson 48-yard pass from KeAndre Lambert-Smith (Jake Pinegar kick)
  PSU 14–0; 5 plays, 80 yards, 2:08
- (00:00) MSU FG: Jack Stone 51-yard field goal
  PSU 14–3; 11 plays, 46 yards, 1:27

Third Quarter

- (05:42) PSU TD: Tyler Warren 14-yard pass from Sean Clifford (Jake Pinegar kick)
  PSU 21–3; 2 plays, 17 yards, 0:45
- (01:37) MSU TD: Maliq Carr 9-yard pass from Payton Thorne (Stephen Rusnak kick)
  PSU 21–10; 10 plays, 75 yards, 4:05

Fourth Quarter

- (10:52) MSU TD: Payton Thorne 2-yard run (2 point conversion failed)
  PSU 21–16; 11 plays 70 yards, 3:56
- (04:31) PSU TD: Nicholas Singleton 12-yard pass from Sean Clifford (Jake Pinegar kick)
  PSU 28–16; 11 plays, 75 yards, 6:21
- (03:56) PSU TD: KeAndre Lambert-Smith 35-yard pass from Sean Clifford (Jake Pinegar kick)
  PSU 35–16; 1 play, 35 yards, 0:08

Passing

- MSU – Payton Thorne: 24/43, 229 yards, 1 TD, 1 INT
- PSU – Sean Clifford: 19/24, 202 yards, 4 TD

Rushing

- MSU – Elijah Collins: 10 carries, 33 yards
- PSU – Kaytron Allen: 21 carries, 82 yards

Receiving

- MSU – Keon Coleman: 8 receptions, 91 yards
- PSU – KeAndre Lambert-Smith: 5 receptions, 83 yards, 1 TD
