= Cade McDonald =

American football player (born 2001)

No. 85 – Ottawa Redblacks
- Position: Wide receiver
- Roster status: Active
- CFL status: American

Personal information
- Born: May 7, 2001 (age 25); Naperville, Illinois, U.S.
- Listed height: 5 ft 10 in (1.78 m)
- Listed weight: 196 lb (89 kg)

Career information
- High school: Naperville Central
- College: Michigan State (2019–2022); Miami (OH) (2023–2024)
- NFL draft: 2025: undrafted

Career history
- Cleveland Browns (2025)*; Ottawa Redblacks (2026–present)
- * Offseason or practice squad member only

Awards and highlights
- Second-team All-MAC (2023)
- Stats at Pro Football Reference
- Stats at CFL.ca

Cade McDonald (born May 7, 2001) is an American professional football wide receiver for the Ottawa Redblacks of the Canadian Football League (CFL). He played college football for the Michigan State Spartans and the Miami Redhawks.

== College career ==
McDonald played college football for the Michigan State Spartans from 2019 to 2022 and the Miami Redhawks from 2023 to 2024. He walked-on to the team at Michigan State and played in three snaps against Rutgers in his redshirt year. McDonald saw limited action the following two years before his junior year where he played in 11 games as punt returner and wide receiver. On May 8, 2023, he transferred to Miami University.

In McDonald's first season at Miami, he recorded 28 catches for 353 yards and three touchdowns. He also returned punts for the RedHawks, leading the conference in average yards per return (12.7), garnering second-team All-MAC honors. In his final year, McDonald had a career season, registering 52 catches for 631 yards and three touchdowns.

== Professional career ==
Pre-draft measurables
Height	Weight	Arm length	Hand span	Wingspan	40-yard dash	10-yard split	20-yard split	20-yard shuttle	Three-cone drill	Vertical jump	Broad jump	Bench press
5 ft 10 in (1.78 m)	196 lb (89 kg)	29 1/8 in (0.74 m)	9 1/4 in (0.23 m)	5 ft 10 5/8 in (1.79 m)	4.58 s	1.64 s	2.62 s	4.13 s	6.75 s	33 in (0.84 m)	10 ft 0 in (3.05 m)	22 reps
All values from Pro Day

=== Cleveland Browns ===
After going undrafted in the 2025 NFL draft, McDonald signed with the Cleveland Browns of the National Football League (NFL) as an undrafted free agent. He was waived by the team on August 26 before reverting to the injured reserve the following day. On October 21, 2025, McDonald was released from the injured reserve.

=== Ottawa Redblacks ===
On February 5, 2026, McDonald signed with the Ottawa Redblacks.

== Career statistics ==
Legend
**Bold**	Career high

=== College ===
Year	Team	Games		Receiving				Rushing				Punt returns			
Year	Team	GP	GS	Rec	Yds	Avg	TD	Att	Yds	Avg	TD	Att	Yds	Avg	TD
2019	Michigan State	1	0	0	0	—	0	0	0	—	0	0	0	—	0
2020	Michigan State	3	0	2	15	7.5	0	0	0	—	0	0	0	—	0
2021	Michigan State	5	0	0	0	—	0	0	0	—	0	1	-1	-1.0	0
2022	Michigan State	11	0	3	31	10.3	0	0	0	—	0	4	44	11.0	0
2023	Miami (OH)	**13**	5	28	355	**12.7**	**3**	**2**	**8**	4.0	0	**18**	**229**	**12.7**	0
2024	Miami (OH)	12	**11**	**52**	**631**	12.1	**3**	1	7	**7.0**	0	14	82	5.9	0
Career		45	16	85	1,032	12.1	6	3	15	5.0	0	37	354	9.6	0
