= Scottie Hazelton =

American football player and coach (born 1973)

Current position
- Title: Defensive coordinator & linebackers coach
- Team: Wake Forest
- Conference: ACC

Biographical details
- Born: December 19, 1973 (age 52); Brighton, Colorado, U.S.

Playing career
- 1992–1995: Fort Lewis
- Position: Linebacker

Coaching career (HC unless noted)
- 1996–1999: Fort Lewis (DB)
- 1999: Fort Lewis (interim DC/DB)
- 2000–2001: North Dakota State (GA)
- 2002–2003: St. Olaf (DB)
- 2004–2005: Missouri Southern (DC)
- 2006: Michigan Tech (LB)
- 2007–2009: North Dakota State (DL)
- 2010–2011: North Dakota State (DC/LB)
- 2012: USC (LB)
- 2013: Nevada (DC)
- 2014–2016: Jacksonville Jaguars (assistant LB)
- 2017–2018: Wyoming (DC/LB)
- 2019: Kansas State (DC/LB)
- 2020–2023: Michigan State (DC)
- 2024: Texas (spec. assistant to the HC)
- 2025–present: Wake Forest (DC/LB)

Scott Gregory Hazelton (born December 19, 1973) is an American college football coach. He is the defensive coordinator and linebackers coach for Wake Forest University, positions he has held since 2025. He also coached for Fort Lewis, North Dakota State, St. Olaf, Missouri Southern, Michigan Tech, USC, Nevada, Wyoming, Kansas State, Michigan State, Texas, and the Jacksonville Jaguars of the National Football League (NFL). He played college football for Fort Lewis as a linebacker.

== Playing career and education ==
Hazelton prepped at Horizon High School in Thornton, Colorado, from 1989 to 1991.

After high school, Hazelton played linebacker at Fort Lewis College where he lettered from 1992 to 1994. He earned a degree in exercise science.

== Coaching career ==
Hazelton began his coaching career with his alma mater, Fort Lewis, as the team's defensive backs coach. In 1999, he was promoted to interim defensive coordinator. In 2000, he became a graduate assistant for North Dakota State under defensive coordinator Gus Bradley.

After finishing his graduate program, Hazelton was hired by St. Olaf as the defensive backs coach, a position he held for two years. He left St. Olaf in 2004 to become the defensive coordinator for Missouri Southern under head coach John Ware. After Ware died and interim head coach Keeth Matheny was not retained he was hired as the linebackers coach for Michigan Tech in 2006.

=== North Dakota State (second stint) ===
In 2007, Hazelton returned to North Dakota State as the defensive line coach. In his first year back with the Bison he helped the defense rank 18th nationally in third down efficiency (33.3%) and 22nd nationally in rushing defense (126.5 ypg). This was all highlighted with wins over FBS opponents Central Michigan 44–14 and Minnesota 27–21.

A year later the defense led the FCS in pass defense (116.82 ypg), 5th in total defense (254 ypg) and 19th in scoring defense (19.18 ppg). In regards to his position his players ranked 3rd nationally in sacks (3.36 sacks per game) and 5th in tackles for a loss (8.55 TFL per game).

2009 was not a good year for the Bison and Hazelton. The defense forced just three interceptions while ranking 90th in scoring defense and finished 3–8 (2–6).

In 2010, Hazelton was promoted to defensive coordinator. His defensive unit greatly improved from 2009 as the Bison ranked 7th nationally in scoring defense (18.21 ppg) and turnover margin (+1.07 avg). As well the defense ranked 15th in pass efficiency and 19th in sacks.

The Bison advanced to the NCAA Football Championship Subdivision (FCS) playoffs in 2010 for the first time in school history during Hazelton's inaugural season as defensive coordinator which included a win over Big 12 member Kansas 6–3. In their game against the Jayhawks Hazelton's defense forced 3 turnovers and held them to under 300 yards.

2011 was a banner year for Hazelton and the Bison as they went on to win the FCS National Championship 17–6 over Sam Houston along with finishing the year with a 14–1 (7–1) record. During the playoffs the Bison rode their defense as they gave up just 27 points in four games. The Bison ranked in the top 20 in six different categories including 1st nationally in points allowed (12.73 ppg) and tied for seventh in takeaways with 31 in 15 games. For the second time in four years Hazelton and the Bison beat Big 10 member Minnesota 37–24.

=== Post-North Dakota State ===
On February 12, 2012, Hazelton was hired as the linebackers coach for USC under head coach Lane Kiffin. Hazelton replaced Joe Barry who left for the NFL.

On January 18, 2013, after just one season with USC, Hazelton was hired by Nevada to be the defensive coordinator under head coach Brian Polian.

On February 10, 2014, Hazelton was hired as the assistant linebackers coach for the Jacksonville Jaguars of the National Football League (NFL); reuniting with head coach Gus Bradley.

On January 10, 2017, Hazelton was reunited with another former colleague this time being Craig Bohl, as Hazelton was hired as the defensive coordinator for Wyoming. In his first season, the Wyoming defense was first in the nation in takeaways, ninth in the nation in scoring defense, and first in the Mountain West Conference (MW) in sacks. In 2019, the Cowboys again finished in the top-30 in the nation in scoring defense and total defense. 13 defenders earned all-conference honors while Hazelton was coordinator.

Hazelton was hired by Kansas State under head coach Chris Klieman to be the defensive coordinator. In his one season at Kansas State, his defense ranked second in the Big 12 Conference in scoring defense and fourth in the Big 12 Conference, a marked improvement for the Wildcat defense over 2019.

On February 28, 2020, Hazelton was announced as Michigan State's defensive coordinator in the team's first season under head coach Mel Tucker.

On June 27, 2024, Hazelton was hired by Texas as a special assistant to the head coach.

In December 2024, Hazelton was hired as the defensive coordinator and linebackers coach by Wake Forest under first-year head coach Jake Dickert.
