= Mel Tucker =

American football player and coach (born 1972)

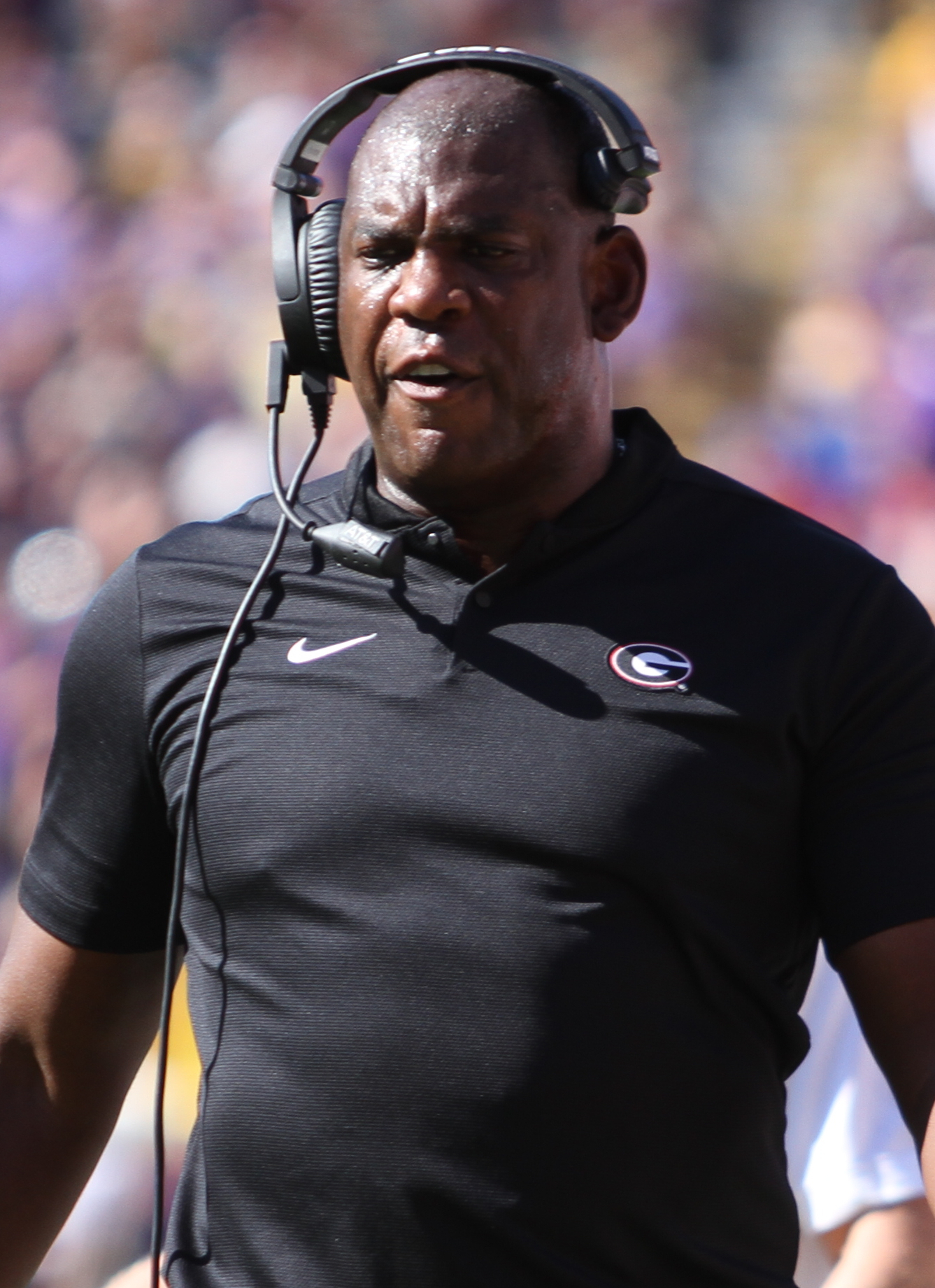
- Tucker with Georgia in 2018

Biographical details
- Born: January 4, 1972 (age 54); Cleveland, Ohio, U.S.

Playing career
- 1990–1992: Wisconsin
- 1994: Wisconsin
- Position: Defensive back

Coaching career (HC unless noted)
- 1997–1998: Michigan State (GA)
- 1999: Miami (OH) (DB)
- 2000: LSU (DB)
- 2001–2003: Ohio State (DB)
- 2004: Ohio State (co-DC)
- 2005–2007: Cleveland Browns (DB)
- 2008: Cleveland Browns (DC)
- 2009–2011: Jacksonville Jaguars (DC)
- 2011: Jacksonville Jaguars (interim)
- 2012: Jacksonville Jaguars (AHC/DC)
- 2013–2014: Chicago Bears (DC)
- 2015: Alabama (AHC/DB)
- 2016–2018: Georgia (DC/DB)
- 2019: Colorado
- 2020–2023: Michigan State

Head coaching record
- Overall: 18–21 (college); 2–3 (NFL)
- Bowls: 1–0

Accomplishments and honors

Awards
- Big Ten Coach of the Year (2021)

Melvin Gene Tucker II (born January 4, 1972) is an American football coach and former player. He was the head football coach at Michigan State University from 2020 to 2023.

Tucker was the interim head coach for the Jacksonville Jaguars of the National Football League (NFL) for the final five games of the 2011 season. He has worked as the defensive backs coach at Ohio State and Alabama and as the defensive coordinator for both the Chicago Bears of the NFL and the University of Georgia.

In November 2021, Mel Tucker became one of the highest-paid coaches in college football history, receiving a guaranteed 10-year, $95 million contract from Michigan State, the third-largest contract ever given to a football coach at a public university. In September 2023, following allegations of sexual harassment, Tucker was fired by Michigan State.

== Early life and player career ==
Tucker was born in Cleveland. He attended Cleveland Heights High School where he was a football standout. He then attended the University of Wisconsin–Madison, where he played defensive back for the Wisconsin Badgers football team. He graduated in 1995 with a degree in agricultural business management. He signed a contract with the Hamilton Tiger-Cats of the Canadian Football League after graduation but fell ill during training camp due to chickenpox and was cut from the team.

== Coaching career ==
=== NCAA ===
Tucker began his coaching career in 1997 as a graduate assistant for Michigan State under head coach Nick Saban. In 1999, he served as a defensive backs coach for the Miami University Redhawks and then in 2000 followed Saban to Louisiana State University to fill the same position with the LSU Tigers. In 2001, he became defensive backs coach for Ohio State under coach Jim Tressel. In 2002, Tucker was the defensive backs coach as Ohio State won a national championship, and in 2004 he was made co-defensive coordinator.

=== NFL ===
In 2005, Tucker entered the National Football League (NFL) with the Cleveland Browns. He coached defensive backs from 2005 to 2007 and was promoted to defensive coordinator in the 2008 season following the firing of Todd Grantham. Under Tucker, Cleveland ranked fifth in the league, with the defense making 23 interceptions. After the firing of Browns' head coach Romeo Crennel, Tucker was replaced by Rob Ryan.

In 2009, Tucker was hired by the Jacksonville Jaguars as their defensive coordinator, replacing Gregg Williams. In the 2011 season, head coach Jack Del Rio put Tucker in charge of defensive play-calling, and the team quickly became the fourth highest rated in the NFL. On November 29, 2011, Tucker was named Jacksonville's interim head coach following the firing of Del Rio. He coached the final five games of the season, posting a 2–3 record. His first win as a head coach on week 14, a 41–14 victory over the Tampa Bay Buccaneers. Jacksonville hired Atlanta Falcons' offensive coordinator Mike Mularkey as the new permanent head coach; Mularkey retained Tucker as defensive coordinator with the additional title of assistant head coach.

On January 18, 2013, Tucker was named defensive coordinator of the Chicago Bears. Following one of the worst defensive seasons in Bears' history in 2013, Tucker was criticized by the media. As a result, the team fired two of Tucker's assistant coaches, linebackers coach Tim Tibesar and defensive line coach Mike Phair. The Bears replaced them with Paul Pasqualoni as defensive line coach and Reggie Herring as linebackers coach.

On January 20, 2015, following another record-setting low defensive season for the Bears in 2014, Tucker was replaced by former San Francisco 49ers defensive coordinator Vic Fangio, under new head coach John Fox.

=== Return to NCAA ===
Tucker spent the 2015 season with the Alabama Crimson Tide as assistant head coach and defensive backs coach, during which the team won the 2016 College Football Playoff National Championship.

In 2016, Tucker moved to Georgia as the defensive coordinator, where he remained through 2018.

=== Colorado ===
On December 5, 2018, Tucker signed an agreement to become the Colorado Buffaloes' head coach starting in 2019. In his lone season at the helm, Tucker's Buffaloes posted a 5–7 record (3–6 in the Pac-12).

=== Michigan State ===
On February 12, 2020, Tucker resigned as Colorado's head coach to accept the same position at Michigan State. Tucker's contract at Michigan State was worth $5.5 million annually for six years; more than double his contract at Colorado (five years, $14.8 million) and more than $1 million annually over previous head coach Mark Dantonio ($4.3 million per annum). At the time of signing, Tucker became the 12th-highest paid head coach in the FBS and fourth in the Big Ten.

With the COVID-19 pandemic forcing a late start for Big Ten teams in the 2020 season, Tucker's Spartans made their debut on October 24, 2020. MSU turned the ball over seven times in Tucker's head coaching debut and lost to Rutgers, 38–27. MSU rebounded the following week to defeat in-state rival Michigan, 27–24, for Tucker's first win as a Spartan. After lopsided losses to Iowa and Indiana, Michigan State upset No. 8-ranked Northwestern, 29–20, handing the Wildcats their first loss of the season. Tucker would finish the abbreviated 2020 season with a 2–5 record.

==== 2021 season ====
Unranked to begin the 2021 season, Tucker's Spartans jumped out to a 8–0 start, including a come-from-behind win over in-state rival and No. 6-ranked Michigan, causing the Spartans to move up to No. 5 in the AP poll and No. 6 in the Coaches poll. In the process, Tucker became the first MSU head coach to beat Michigan in his first two career meetings. Tucker's Spartans were ranked No. 3 in the initial CFP rankings released Nov. 2.

Following MSU's first loss at Purdue in Week 9, the Spartans dropped to No. 8 in the AP poll and No. 9 in the Coaches' poll. The loss also dropped MSU to No. 7 in the CFP rankings. MSU's 40–21 victory over Maryland on November 13, coupled with Oklahoma's first loss of the season, moved the Spartans up to No. 7 in the AP poll and No. 8 in the Coaches' poll. Following a crushing 56–7 defeat at the hands of Ohio State, the 9–2 Spartans dropped to No. 12 in the AP poll and No. 13 in the Coaches' poll. MSU closed out the regular season with a 30–27 victory over Penn State, moving them up to No. 11 in the AP poll while remaining at No. 13 in the Coaches' poll. Michigan State reached 10 wins for the first time since 2017, and went undefeated at home (6–0) for the first time since 2015. The Spartans went on to defeat Pittsburgh in the Peach Bowl 31–21, marking MSU's first 11-win season since their Big 10 winning 2015 campaign. MSU finished the season ranked No. 8 in the Coaches Poll and No. 9 in the AP poll, the team's highest rankings since 2015.

On November 24, MSU and Tucker agreed to a 10-year, $95 million contract extension. This decision caused considerable surprise among college football observers, as Tucker had a career record of 16–14 at the time.

On November 30, Tucker won the Big Ten Coach of the Year awards, being named both the Hayes-Schembechler Coach of the Year (coaches' vote) and the Dave McClain Coach of the Year (media vote).

==== 2022 season ====
MSU began the 2022 season ranked in both the AP and Coaches' polls. But after opening the season with wins over Western Michigan and Akron, the Spartans lost their next four games, against Washington, Minnesota, Maryland and Ohio State, all by double-digit margins. After ending the losing streak with a double-overtime home win against Wisconsin, the Spartans again lost by double-digits, this time to Michigan. The season concluded with another double digit loss to Penn State and no bowl game for the second time in three years.

==== 2023 season ====
MSU won their first two games under Tucker, defeating Central Michigan 31–7 and Richmond 45–14. Michigan State suspended Tucker after two games and he was officially fired on September 27, 2023.

==== Sexual harassment accusation and firing ====
On September 10, 2023, USA Today published a story detailing alleged sexual harassment by Tucker of Brenda Tracy. Tracy, a rape survivor and anti-sexual violence advocate, had visited Michigan State's campus several times to speak with the team. Tracy alleged a pattern of inappropriate behavior, culminating in Tucker masturbating during a phone call. The incident is alleged to have occurred in April 2022. Tucker characterized his behavior as consensual. Michigan State suspended Tucker without pay later that day, with Harlon Barnett taking over as interim head coach. On September 18, the university announced it had begun the process of terminating Tucker for cause as a result of the allegations, while allowing an ongoing university investigation to continue. In a letter from his attorneys, Tucker disputed the allegations. Tucker was officially fired by Michigan State on September 27, 2023. On July 31, 2024, he filed a wrongful termination and defamation lawsuit against the university.

== Head coaching record ==
=== NFL ===
Team	Year	Regular season					Postseason			
Team	Year	Won	Lost	Ties	Win %	Finish	Won	Lost	Win %	Result
JAX*	2011	2	3	0	.400	4th in AFC South	–	–	–	–

* – Interim head coach

=== College ===
Year	Team	Overall	Conference	Standing	Bowl/playoffs	Coaches^{#}	AP^{°}
Colorado Buffaloes (Pac-12 Conference) (2019)
2019	Colorado	5–7	3–6	5th (South)			
Colorado:		5–7	3–6				
Michigan State Spartans (Big Ten Conference) (2020–2023)
2020	Michigan State	2–5	2–5	7th (East)			
2021	Michigan State	11–2	7–2	3rd (East)	W Peach^{†}	8	9
2022	Michigan State	0–7 (Note: 5 wins (3 conference wins) were vacated in 2022 and 2 wins were vacated in 2023 as a result of an NCAA settlement over recruiting violations during Mel Tucker's tenure.)	0–6	5th (East)			
2023	Michigan State	0–0 (Note: Michigan State suspended Tucker after two games.)	0–0	(East)			
Michigan State:		13–14	9–13				
Total:		18–21					
^{†}Indicates CFP / New Years' Six bowl.; ^{#}Rankings from final Coaches Poll.; ^{°}Rankings from final AP Poll.
