= Tre Mosley =

American football player (born 2001)

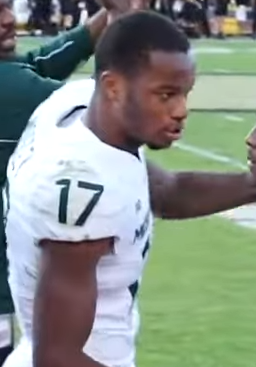
- Mosley with Michigan State in 2021

Profile
- Position: Wide receiver

Personal information
- Born: September 25, 2001 (age 25); Pontiac, Michigan, U.S.
- Listed height: 6 ft 2 in (1.88 m)
- Listed weight: 200 lb (91 kg)

Career information
- High school: West Bloomfield
- College: Michigan State (2019–2023)
- NFL draft: 2024: undrafted

Career history
- Cincinnati Bengals (2024)*; Saskatchewan Roughriders (2024)*
- * Offseason or practice squad member only

Tre Mosley (born September 25, 2001) is an American professional football wide receiver. He played college football for the Michigan State Spartans.

== Early life ==
Mosley attended high school at West Bloomfield. In Mosely's junior season he brought in 55 receptions for 1,030 yards and ten touchdowns. Coming out of high school, Mosley was rated as a three star recruit, the 21st ranked prospect in Michigan, and the top overall receiver in Michigan in the class of 2019. Mosley also held offers from schools such as Michigan State, Michigan, Minnesota, Missouri, Oregon, Purdue and Cincinnati. Mosley ultimately decided to commit to play college football for the Michigan State Spartans.

== College career ==
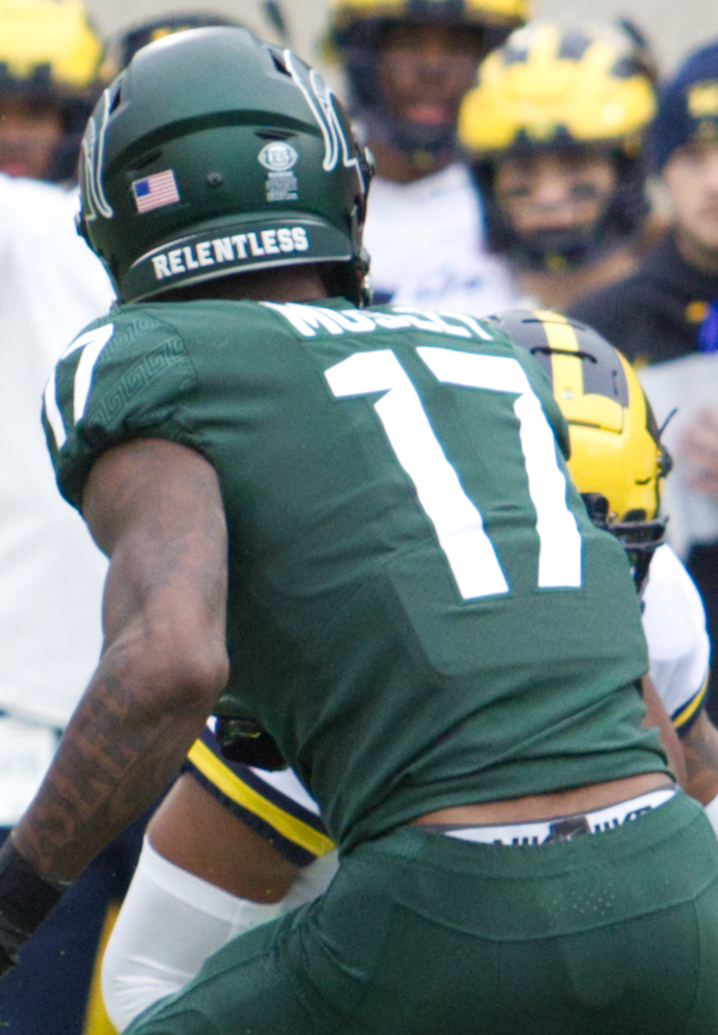
Mosley with Michigan State in 2021

In the 2019 regular season finale, Mosley tallied eight receptions for 73 yards, as he helped the Spartans beat Maryland. Mosley finished his freshman season playing in six games where he caught 21 passes for 216 yards and a touchdown. During the COVID shorted 2020 season, Mosley caught just seven passes for 71 yards. In the 2021 season, Mosley would have a breakout season notching 35 receptions for 530 yards and three touchdowns. During the 2022 season, Mosley hauled in 35 receptions for 359 yards and four touchdowns. In Mosley's final career season in 2023 he notched 28 receptions for 288 yards and two touchdowns. After the conclusion of the 2023 season, Mosley decided to declare for the 2024 NFL draft.

== Professional career ==
Pre-draft measurables
Height	Weight	Arm length	Hand span	40-yard dash	10-yard split	20-yard split	Vertical jump	Broad jump
6 ft 1 in (1.85 m)	196 lb (89 kg)	32 3/8 in (0.82 m)	9 in (0.23 m)	4.59 s	1.60 s	2.44 s	32.0 in (0.81 m)	9 ft 11 in (3.02 m)
All values from Pro Day

After not being selected in the 2024 NFL draft, Mosley signed with the Cincinnati Bengals as an undrafted free agent. He was waived on August 7.

He was signed to the practice roster of the Saskatchewan Roughriders of the Canadian Football League on September 15, 2024. He was released on October 13, 2024.
