= Ted Gilmore =

American football player and coach (born 1967)

Biographical details
- Born: March 21, 1967 (age 59); Wichita, Kansas

Playing career
- 1986–1987: Butler Community College
- 1988–1989: Wyoming
- Position: Wide receiver

Coaching career (HC unless noted)
- 1994–1996: Wyoming (GA/WR/TE)
- 1997–1998: Wyoming (WR)
- 1999: Kansas (TE)
- 2000: Houston (WR)
- 2001–2002: Purdue (WR)
- 2003–2004: Colorado (WR)
- 2005–2006: Nebraska (WR)
- 2007: Nebraska (WR/RC)
- 2008–2010: Nebraska (assistant HC / WR / RC)
- 2011: USC (WR)
- 2012–2014: Oakland Raiders (WR)
- 2015–2016: Wisconsin (WR)
- 2017–2019: Wisconsin (PGC/WR)
- 2020–2023: Michigan State (TE)

Theodore I. Gilmore (born March 21, 1967) is an American football coach and former player. He was most recently the tight ends coach at Michigan State University. While Gilmore has coached tight ends previously at the University of Kansas in 2000, most of his coaching experience has been as a wide receivers coach, coaching the position at seven different schools and with the Oakland Raiders of the NFL.

== Early life ==
Gilmore was born in Wichita, Kansas on March 21, 1967, and graduated from Wichita South High School, where he lettered in football, basketball and track.

== Playing career ==
Gilmore's college playing career began in 1986 at the Butler Community College, where he played Wide receiver, after the conclusion of his high school career at Wichita South. He transferred to the University of Wyoming after two years, earning second-team All-Western Athletic Conference honors in his senior year. Two years later, in 1991, he completed his bachelor's degree in Sociology at Wyoming.

== Coaching career ==
Gilmore began his coaching career in 1994 at his alma mater, Wyoming, as a graduate assistant under Joe Tiller. He worked with the tight ends and wide receivers, including two-time All-American and Biletnikoff Award winner Marcus Harris. In 1997, Gilmore was promoted to wide receivers coach, and served another two years at Wyoming.

Gilmore spent 1999 as the tight ends coach at the University of Kansas, and the following year served as tight ends coach at the University of Houston, before rejoining Tiller at Purdue University as wide receivers coach in 2001. Gilmore coached all-time NCAA reception leader Taylor Stubblefield as well as Big Ten Conference all-time career receptions leader John Standeford.

In 2003, Gilmore was hired by the University of Colorado at Boulder, again as wide receivers coach, and worked alongside Shawn Watson, with whom he would later work with at the University of Nebraska–Lincoln. While at Colorado, Gilmore coached all-Big 12 Conference and future Seattle Seahawks receiver D. J. Hackett to a school record 78 receptions as a senior.

Gilmore was hired at the University of Nebraska–Lincoln in 2005 by head coach Bill Callahan. He served as the wide receivers coach, while also serving as the staff's recruiting coordinator. Under Gilmore's tutelage, receivers Terrance Nunn and Maurice Purify finished ranked as the No. 2 and No. 5 career receivers at Nebraska, with Nunn finishing just seven yards short of the all-time school record held by Johnny Rodgers and Purify finishing just short of the school's all-time receptions record. In 2007, the Nebraska receivers helped the team to a No. 8 national ranking in passing offense and a No. 11 ranking in total offense. At the conclusion of the 2007 season, Gilmore was retained in his previous duties by new Nebraska head coach Bo Pelini while also being promoted to assistant head coach.

After the 2010 season Pellini did not renew his Gilmore's contract. On February 24, 2011, Gilmore was named wide receivers coach at the University of Southern California (USC). In 2011, Gilmore was named Wide Receivers Coach of the Year by FootballScoop.

In February 2012, Gilmore was hired by new Oakland Raiders coach Dennis Allen as wide receivers coach.
