= Jay Johnson (American football coach) =

American football player and coach (born 1969)

Current position
- Title: Assistant quarterbacks coach / interim offensive coordinator
- Team: Oregon
- Conference: Big Ten

Biographical details
- Born: September 18, 1969 (age 57); Austin, Minnesota, U.S.
- Education: Northern Iowa (1992)

Playing career
- 1989–1992: Northern Iowa
- Position: Quarterback

Coaching career (HC unless noted)
- 1993: Hickman HS (MO) (QB/WR/DB)
- 1994: Missouri (GA)
- 1994: Augsburg (OC/RC)
- 1995–1996: Truman State (OC)
- 1997–1998: Kansas (GA)
- 1999–2000: Kansas (QB)
- 2001: Kansas (RB)
- 2003: Southern Miss (RB)
- 2004: Southern Miss (TE)
- 2005–2007: Southern Miss (OC/QB)
- 2008: Louisville (OQC)
- 2009: Louisville (TE)
- 2010: Central Michigan (QB)
- 2011–2015: Louisiana (OC/QB)
- 2016: Minnesota (OC/QB)
- 2017–2018: Georgia (OQC)
- 2019: Colorado (OC/QB)
- 2020–2023: Michigan State (OC/QB)
- 2024–2025: Wyoming (OC/QB)
- 2026: Oregon (OC / assistant QB)

Jay Johnson (born September 18, 1969) is an American college football coach and former player. He is an assistant quarterbacks coach and current interim offensive coordinator for the University of Oregon, a position he has held since 2026.

== Playing career ==
=== University of Northern Iowa ===
Johnson played quarterback for the UNI Panthers from 1989 to 1992. In 1992, he was second-team all-conference. In his final three seasons, he was the starting quarterback, leading UNI to three straight playoff appearances. One of his backups for these three seasons was future NFL Hall of Fame quarterback, Kurt Warner.

== Coaching career ==
=== Minnesota ===
In December 2015, Minnesota hired Johnson from Louisana-Lafayette, where he served as associate head coach, offensive coordinator, and quarterbacks coach for the previous five seasons. Johnson spent one season with the Gophers, where they improved their scoring by a touchdown, from 22.5 to 29.3 points per game. The Gophers recorded a 9–4 record and beat Washington State in the Holiday Bowl.

=== Colorado ===
On December 15, 2018, Johnson was hired as offensive coordinator and quarterbacks coach for Colorado.

=== Michigan State ===
On February 20, 2020, Johnson was hired as offensive coordinator and quarterbacks coach for Michigan State.

In 2021, Michigan State averaged nearly 32 points per game and finished ranked #9 in the AP poll. The Spartans offense featured Kenneth Walker III, who won the Doak Walker and Walter Camp Player of the Year Award and finished 6th in the Heisman for the 2021 NCAA season.

=== Wyoming ===
On January 10, 2024, Johnson was announced as the new offensive coordinator and quarterbacks coach for the University of Wyoming. On October 20, 2025, Johnson was fired mid season by head coach Jay Sawvel after a season of offensive struggles.

=== Oregon ===
Johnson was hired as an assistant quarterbacks coach for the University of Oregon in 2026. Johnson was named the Ducks' interim offensive coordinator on October 26, 2026 following the firing of Drew Mehringer. Johnson's offensive play calling was spotlighted after the Ducks notched a 41-28 upset win over #12 Ohio State on November 8, 2026.
