= Chris Kapilovic =

American football player and coach (born 1968)

Current position
- Title: Offensive assistant
- Team: Auburn
- Conference: SEC

Biographical details
- Born: November 11, 1968 (age 57); Cleveland, Ohio
- Education: Missouri State (1992)

Playing career
- 1987–1988: Scottsdale CC
- 1989–1990: Missouri State
- Position: Offensive tackle

Coaching career (HC unless noted)
- 1992–1997: Deer Valley HS (AZ) (OC)
- 1998: Phoenix College (OL)
- 1999–2000: Kansas (GA)
- 2001–2002: Alabama State (OL)
- 2003–2005: Alabama State (OC/OL)
- 2006–2007: Missouri State (OL/RGC)
- 2008–2009: Southern Miss (OL)
- 2010–2011: Southern Miss (OL/RGC)
- 2012–2013: North Carolina (OL/RGC)
- 2014: North Carolina (co-OC/OL)
- 2015–2018: North Carolina (AHC/OC/OL)
- 2019: Colorado (OL/RGC)
- 2020–2023: Michigan State (AHC/OL/RGC)
- 2024–2025: Alabama (OL)
- 2026-present: Auburn (OA)

Chris Kapilovic (born November 11, 1968) is an American college football coach and former player. He is Currently an Offensive assistant for the Auburn Tigers. He was previously the offensive line coach for the University of Alabama, a position he held from 2024 to 2025.

== Playing career ==
Chris Kapilovic was born on November 11, 1968, in Cleveland, Ohio. He attended and played football at Gerard Catholic High School in Phoenix, Arizona. He initially attended nearby Scottsdale Community College before transferring to Missouri State University in Springfield, Missouri.

== Coaching career ==
=== Colorado ===
On December 20, 2018, Kapilovic was hired as offensive line coach and run game coordinator for Colorado.

=== Michigan State ===
On February 17, 2020, Kapilovic was hired as offensive line coach and run game coordinator for Michigan State.

=== Alabama ===
On February 19, 2024, Alabama hired Kapilovic as their Offensive Line coach to replace Scott Huff who left Alabama for the same job at the Seattle Seahawks.
