= William Peagler =

American football player and coach (born 1985)

James Madison Dukes
- Title: Running backs coach

Personal information
- Born: April 27, 1985 (age 41); Camp Lejeune, North Carolina, U.S.

Career information
- College: Clemson

Career history
- Clemson (2006–2009) Student assistant; Valdosta State (2010) Tight ends coach; Louisiana (2011) Offensive quality control assistant; Louisiana (2012–2013) Graduate assistant; Coffeyville Community College (2014) Run game coordinator/recruiting coordinator; Olive Branch HS (MS) (2015) Offensive coordinator/offensive line coach; Minnesota (2016) Offensive quality control; Georgia (2017) Graduate assistant; Louisiana (2018) Director of player personnel/quality control coordinator; Colorado (2019) Director of quality control; Michigan State (2020–2021) Running backs coach; Florida (2022) Tight ends coach; Arizona Cardinals (2023–2024) Assistant defensive line coach; Florida (2025) Offensive analyst; James Madison (2026–present) Running backs coach

William Peagler (born April 27, 1985) is an American football coach and former player who is currently the running backs coach for the James Madison Dukes.

== Coaching career ==
=== Michigan State ===
On February 24, 2020, Peagler was hired as running backs coach for Michigan State.

=== Arizona Cardinals ===
On February 22, 2023, Peagler was hired by the Arizona Cardinals to serve as the team's assistant defensive line coach.
