= Simeon Barrow =

American football player (born 2002)

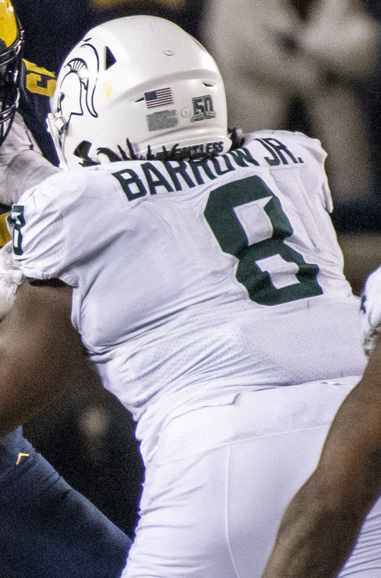
- Barrow with Michigan State in 2022

Profile
- Position: Defensive lineman

Personal information
- Born: July 6, 2002 (age 24); Brooklyn, NY, U.S.
- Listed height: 6 ft 1 in (1.85 m)
- Listed weight: 283 lb (128 kg)

Career information
- High school: Grovetown
- College: Michigan State (2020–2023); Miami (FL) (2024)
- NFL draft: 2025: undrafted

Career history
- Atlanta Falcons (2025)*; Cleveland Browns (2025)*; Miami Dolphins (2025)*
- * Offseason or practice squad member only

Awards and highlights
- First-team All-ACC (2024)

Simeon Barrow Jr. (born July 6, 2002) is an American professional football defensive lineman. He played college football for the Michigan State Spartans and Miami Hurricanes.

== Early life ==
Coming out of high school, Barrow was rated as a three-star recruit and committed to play college football for the Michigan State Spartans over offers from schools such as Georgia Tech, Tennessee, Virginia Tech, West Virginia, and Missouri.

== College career ==
=== Michigan State ===
Barrow opted out of the 2020 season due to the COVID-19 pandemic. In week 5 of the 2021 season, he totaled seven tackles and half a sack in a win over Nebraska. In 2021, Barrow totaled 34 tackles with four being for a loss, three sacks, a pass deflection, and a forced fumble. He finished the 2022 season with 40 tackles with nine being for a loss, four sacks, and a fumble recovery. In 2023, Barrow notched 36 tackles with five and a half being for a loss, three and a half sacks, a forced fumble, and two blocked kicks. After the season, he entered his name into the NCAA transfer portal.

=== Miami ===
Barrow transferred to play for the Miami Hurricanes.

== Professional career ==
Pre-draft measurables
Height	Weight	Arm length	Hand span	40-yard dash	10-yard split	20-yard split	20-yard shuttle	Three-cone drill	Bench press
6 ft 1 3/8 in (1.86 m)	283 lb (128 kg)	32 3/8 in (0.82 m)	9 1/8 in (0.23 m)	4.90 s	1.69 s	2.72 s	4.30 s	7.56 s	32 reps
All values from Pro Day

=== Atlanta Falcons ===
On April 28, 2025, after going unselected in the 2025 NFL draft, Barrow signed with the Atlanta Falcons as an undrafted free agent. He was waived on August 26 as part of final roster cuts and re-signed to the practice squad a week later. Barrow was released from the practice squad on September 6.

=== Cleveland Browns ===
On October 14, 2025, Barrow signed with the Cleveland Browns' practice squad. He was released on November 11. On December 2, Barrow was re-signed to the team's practice squad. Barrow was released again on December 10.

=== Miami Dolphins ===
On December 30, 2025, Barrow was signed to the Miami Dolphins' practice squad.
