= Michael Fletcher (defensive tackle) =

American gridiron football player (born 2001)

- Fletcher with the Winnipeg Blue Bombers in 2026

No. 93 – Winnipeg Blue Bombers
- Position: Defensive tackle
- Roster status: Active
- CFL status: American

Personal information
- Born: February 19, 2001 (age 25)
- Listed height: 6 ft 5 in (1.96 m)
- Listed weight: 271 lb (123 kg)

Career information
- High school: Carman-Ainsworth (Flint Township, Michigan)
- College: Michigan State (2019–2022); Appalachian State (2023–2024)
- NFL draft: 2025: undrafted

Career history
- New York Jets (2025)*; Winnipeg Blue Bombers (2026–present)
- * Offseason or practice squad member only
- Stats at CFL.ca

Michael Fletcher (born February 19, 2001) is an American professional football defensive tackle for the Winnipeg Blue Bombers of the Canadian Football League (CFL). He played college football for the Michigan State Spartans and Appalachian State Mountaineers.

== Early life ==
Fletcher was born on February 19, 2001. He attended Carman-Ainsworth High School in Flint Township, Michigan.

== College career ==
Fletcher played college football for the Michigan State Spartans from 2019 to 2022 and Appalachian State Mountaineers and 2023 to 2024. At Michigan State, he had 31 tackles, including four for loss, three sacks, two pass deflections and a blocked kick in 22 games.

On December 19, 2022, Fletcher transferred to Appalachian State University. In 23 games, he recorded 40 tackles, nine for loss, 8.5 sacks, one pass break up, one forced fumble and two fumble recoveries.

== Professional career ==
Pre-draft measurables
Height	Weight	Arm length	Hand span	Wingspan	40-yard dash	10-yard split	20-yard split	20-yard shuttle	Three-cone drill	Vertical jump	Broad jump	Bench press
6 ft 5 in (1.96 m)	288 lb (131 kg)	35 7/8 in (0.91 m)	9 in (0.23 m)	6 ft 11 3/4 in (2.13 m)	4.93 s	1.61 s	2.82 s	4.73 s	7.69 s	33.5 in (0.85 m)	9 ft 9 in (2.97 m)	25 reps
All values from Pro day

=== New York Jets ===
After going undrafted in the 2025 NFL draft, Fletcher signed with the New York Jets as an undrafted free agent. On August 24, he was waived by the team.

=== Winnipeg Blue Bombers ===
On February 6, 2026, Fletcher was signed by the Winnipeg Blue Bombers of the Canadian Football League (CFL). On May 19, he was released but re-signed with the team on May 25. On May 31, Fletcher was signed to the practice roster. On June 8, he was elevated to the active roster and made his CFL debut on June 11 against the Hamilton Tiger-Cats, where he made one tackle.
