= Dashaun Mallory =

American football player (born 1999)

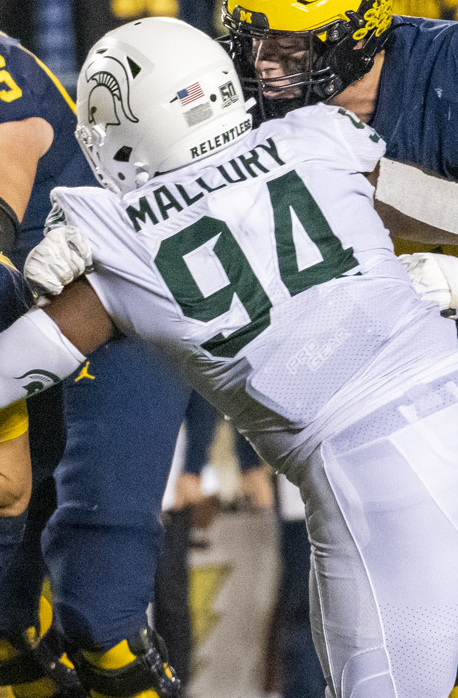
- Mallory with Michigan State in 2022

Profile
- Position: Defensive tackle

Personal information
- Born: October 10, 1999 (age 27); Bolingbrook, Illinois, U.S.
- Listed height: 6 ft 1 in (1.85 m)
- Listed weight: 275 lb (125 kg)

Career information
- High school: Bolingbrook
- College: Michigan State (2018–2022); Arizona State (2023)
- NFL draft: 2024: undrafted

Career history
- Chicago Bears (2024)*; Calgary Stampeders (2025)*
- * Offseason or practice squad member only
- Stats at Pro Football Reference

Dashaun Mallory (born October 10, 1999) is an American professional football defensive tackle. He played college football for the Arizona State Sun Devils and Michigan State Spartans.

== Early life ==
During Mallory's senior season he totaled 20 tackles for a loss, 12 sacks, six forced fumbles, and two total touchdowns en route to helping his team to a 7-4 record. Coming out of high school, Mallory was rated as a three star recruit, where he decided to commit to play college football for the Michigan State Spartans.

== College career ==
=== Michigan State ===
In Mallory's first two seasons in 2020 and 2021, he combined for 27 tackles with three and a half being for a loss, two sacks, and a pass deflection. During the 2022 season, Mallory played in eight games with two starts where he notched 16 tackles with one and a half being for a loss, half a sack, and two fumble recoveries. After the conclusion of the 2022 season, Mallory decided to enter his name into the NCAA transfer portal.

=== Arizona State ===
Mallory decided to transfer to play for the Arizona State Sun Devils. During Mallory's final collegiate season in 2023 he tallied 48 tackles with ten being for a loss, two sacks, and four pass deflections.

== Professional career ==
Pre-draft measurables
Height	Weight	Arm length	Hand span	40-yard dash	10-yard split	20-yard split	20-yard shuttle	Three-cone drill	Vertical jump	Broad jump	Bench press
6 ft 0 7/8 in (1.85 m)	265 lb (120 kg)	31 in (0.79 m)	9 1/8 in (0.23 m)	5.12 s	1.76 s	2.91 s	4.92 s	7.59 s	30 in (0.76 m)	8 ft 6 in (2.59 m)	19 reps
All values from Pro Day

=== Chicago Bears ===
After not being selected in the 2024 NFL draft, Mallory decided to sign with the Chicago Bears as an undrafted free agent. He was waived on August 27, and re-signed to the practice squad.

=== Calgary Stampeders ===
Mallory signed with the Calgary Stampeders of the CFL on May 15, 2025. He was released on June 1, 2025.
