= 2024 Michigan State Spartans football team =

American college football season

2024 Michigan State Spartans football
- Conference: Big Ten Conference
- Record: 0–7, 5 wins vacated (0–6, 3 wins vacated Big Ten)
- Head coach: Jonathan Smith (1st season)
- Offensive coordinator: Brian Lindgren (1st season)
- Offensive scheme: Multiple
- Defensive coordinator: Joe Rossi (1st season)
- Base defense: Multiple 4–2–5
- Captains: Aidan Chiles; Nate Carter; Maverick Hansen; Tanner Miller; Jordan Turner
- Home stadium: Spartan Stadium

Uniform
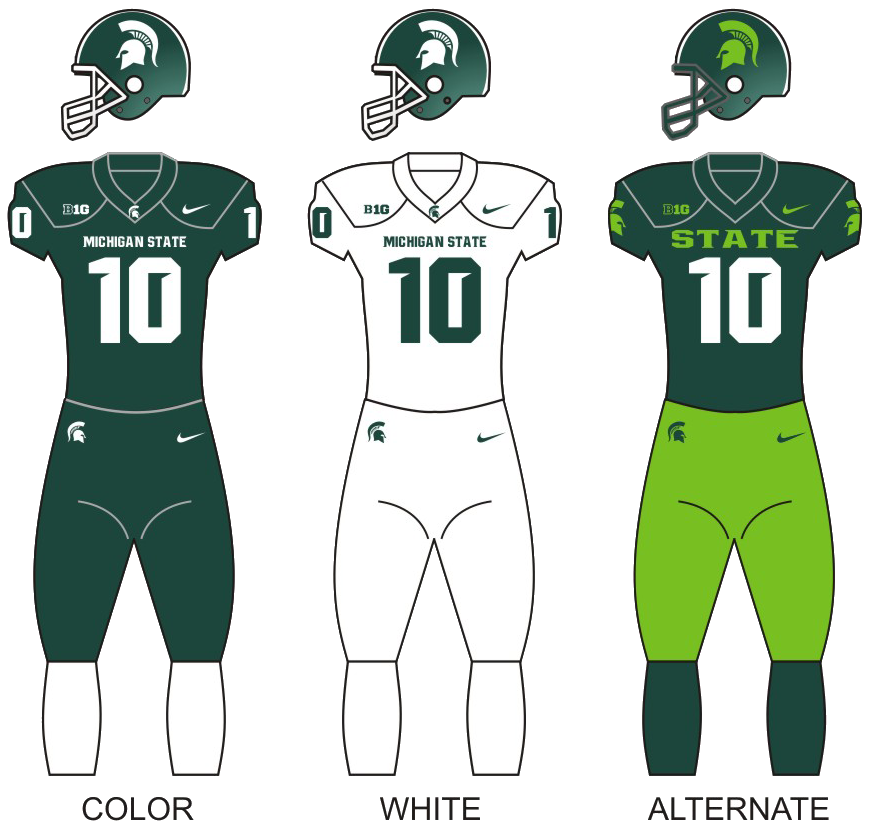

2024 Big Ten Conference football standings
	Conf.			Overall
Team	W		L	W		L
No. 3 Oregon y$^	9	–	0	13	–	1
No. 10 Indiana ^	8	–	1	11	–	2
No. 5 Penn State y^	8	–	1	13	–	3
No. 1 Ohio State #^	7	–	2	14	–	2
No. 16 Illinois	6	–	3	10	–	3
Iowa	6	–	3	8	–	5
Michigan	5	–	4	8	–	5
Minnesota	5	–	4	8	–	5
USC	4	–	5	7	–	6
Rutgers	4	–	5	7	–	6
Washington	4	–	5	6	–	7
Nebraska	3	–	6	7	–	6
UCLA	3	–	6	5	–	7
Wisconsin	3	–	6	5	–	7
Northwestern	2	–	7	4	–	8
Maryland	1	–	8	4	–	8
Michigan State†	0	–	6	0	–	7
Purdue	0	–	9	1	–	11
Championship: Oregon 45, Penn State 37
# – College Football Playoff champion; ^ – College Football Playoff participant; $ – Conference champion; y – Championship game participant; † — NCAA vacated all wins for Michigan State (5–7, 3–6); Rankings from AP Poll

The 2024 Michigan State Spartans football team represented Michigan State University as a member of the Big Ten Conference during the 2024 NCAA Division I FBS football season. The Spartans played their home games at Spartan Stadium located in East Lansing, Michigan, and were led by first-year head coach Jonathan Smith. The Spartans finished the season 5–7, 3–6 in Big Ten play to finish in a tie for 12th place. On November 12, 2025, the 5 wins were vacated as a result of an NCAA settlement over recruiting violations during Mel Tucker's tenure.

Following the removal and eventual firing of head coach Mel Tucker after the first two games of the 2023 season following disclosures relating to alleged sexual harassment, defensive backs coach Harlon Barnett was named the interim coach and former head coach Mark Dantonio agreed to return as the team's associate head coach for the remainder of the season. On November 26, the school named Oregon State head coach Jonathan Smith the team's new head coach for the 2024 season.

After beating Prairie View A&M on September 14, the Spartans moved to 3–0 on the season. Smith became the first MSU head coach to start 3–0 in his debut season with the team since Mark Dantonio in 2007. However, the Spartans finished the season by losing seven of the remaining nine games and failing to be eligible for a bowl game for the third consecutive season. This had not occurred since the 2004 through 2006 seasons. The Spartans also lost to a first-year Michigan head coach for the first time since 1948.

== Schedule ==
Date	Time	Opponent	Site	TV	Result	Attendance
August 30	7:00 p.m.	Florida Atlantic*	Spartan Stadium; East Lansing, MI	BTN	W 16–10 (vacated)	70,271
September 7	3:30 p.m.	at Maryland	SECU Stadium; College Park, MD	BTN	W 27–24 (vacated)	34,819
September 14	3:30 p.m.	Prairie View A&M*	Spartan Stadium; East Lansing, MI	BTN	W 40–0 (vacated)	70,066
September 21	8:00 p.m.	at Boston College*	Alumni Stadium; Chestnut Hill, MA	ACCN	L 19–23	44,500
September 28	7:30 p.m.	No. 3 Ohio State	Spartan Stadium; East Lansing, MI	Peacock	L 7–38	71,114
October 4	9:00 p.m.	at No. 6 Oregon	Autzen Stadium; Eugene, OR	FOX	L 10–31	59,802
October 19	7:30 p.m.	Iowa^{†}	Spartan Stadium; East Lansing, MI	NBC	W 32–20 (vacated)	69,682
October 26	7:30 p.m.	at Michigan	Michigan Stadium; Ann Arbor, MI (rivalry)	BTN	L 17–24	110,849
November 2	3:30 p.m.	No. 13 Indiana	Spartan Stadium; East Lansing, MI (rivalry)	Peacock	L 10–47	68,423
November 16	2:30 p.m.	at Illinois	Memorial Stadium; Champaign, IL	FS1	L 16–38	52,660
November 22	8:00 p.m.	Purdue	Spartan Stadium; East Lansing, MI	FOX	W 24–17 (vacated)	57,558
November 30	3:30 p.m.	Rutgers	Spartan Stadium; East Lansing, MI	FS1	L 14–41	50,038
*Non-conference game; ^{†}Homecoming; Rankings from AP Poll - Released prior to game; All times are in Eastern time; Source:

== Rankings ==
Ranking movements Legend: ██ Increase in ranking ██ Decrease in ranking — = Not ranked RV = Received votes
	Week																
Poll	Pre	1	2	3	4	5	6	7	8	9	10	11	12	13	14	15	Final
AP	—	—	—	—	—	—	—	—	—	—	—	—	—	—	—	—	—
Coaches	—	—	RV	RV	—	—	—	—	—	—	—	—	—	—	—	—	—
CFP	Not released										—	—	—	—	—	—	Not released

== Game summaries ==
=== vs Florida Atlantic ===
Florida Atlantic Owls (0–0) vs Michigan State Spartans (0–0) – Game summary

Quarter	1	2	3	4	Total
Owls	0	3	7	0	10
Spartans	2	14	0	0	16

at Spartan Stadium • East Lansing, Michigan

- Date: August 30
- Game time: 7:00 p.m. EDT
- Game weather: 84 °F (29 °C), Wind: 6 mph W, Cloudy
- Game attendance: 70,271
- Referee: Bryan Banks
- TV announcers (BTN): Jason Ross Jr. (play-by-play) and Brock Vereen (analyst)

Game information

First quarter

- (7:49) MSU – Cam Fancher sacked in end zone for a safety (Michigan State 2–0)

Second quarter

- (11:15) MSU – Aidan Chiles 11-yard run, Jonathan Kim kick (Drive: 3 plays, 18 yards, 0:48; Michigan State 9–0)
- (9:07) MSU – Kay'Ron Lynch-Adams 63-yard run, Jonathan Kim kick (Drive: 1 play, 63 yards, 0:10; Michigan State 16–0)
- (4:43) FAU – Morgan Suarez 43-yard field goal (Drive: 8 plays, 52 yards, 4:20; Michigan State 16–3)

Third quarter

- (0:07) FAU – Jayshon Platt 10-yard pass from Cam Fancher, Morgan Suarez kick (Drive: 7 plays, 40 yards, 2:52; Michigan State 16–10)

Fourth quarter

- No scoring plays

Statistics	FAU	MSU
First downs	19	15
Plays–yards	72–248	61–293
Rushes–yards	47–132	35–179
Passing yards	116	114
Passing: comp–att–int	12–25–2	10–24–2
Time of possession	29:19	30:41

Team	Category	Player	Statistics
Florida Atlantic	Passing	Cam Fancher	12/25, 116 yards, 1 TD, 2 INT
Florida Atlantic	Rushing	Cam Fancher	25 carries, 67 yards
Florida Atlantic	Receiving	Omari Hayes	5 receptions, 74 yards
Michigan State	Passing	Aidan Chiles	10/24, 114 yards, 2 INT
Michigan State	Rushing	Kay'Ron Lynch-Adams	9 carries, 101 yards, 1 TD
Michigan State	Receiving	Michael Masunas	2 receptions, 29 yards

=== at Maryland ===
Michigan State Spartans (1–0) at Maryland Terrapins (1–0) – Game summary

Quarter	1	2	3	4	Total
Spartans	7	10	0	10	27
Terrapins	14	0	3	7	24

at SECU Stadium • College Park, Maryland

- Date: September 7
- Game time: 3:30 p.m. EDT/12:30 p.m. PDT
- Game weather: 72 °F (22 °C), Wind: 8 mph NW, Cloudy
- Game attendance: 34,819
- Referee: Jerry McGinn
- TV announcers (BTN): Jason Ross Jr. (play-by-play), Anthony Herron (analyst), and Kylen Mills (sideline)

Game information

First quarter

- (08:30) UMD TD: Tai Felton 15-yard pass from Billy Edwards Jr. (Jack Howes kick) UMD 7–0; 14 plays, 75 yards, 6:30
- (05:17) MSU TD: Montorie Foster Jr. 9-yard pass from Aidan Chiles (Jonathan Kim kick) Tied 7–7; 8 plays, 84 yards, 3:07
- (00:47) UMD TD: Billy Edwards Jr. 7-yard run (Jack Howes kick) UMD 14–7; 2 plays, 17 yards, 00:47

Second quarter

- (10:07) MSU TD: Jaron Glover 34-yard pass from Aidan Chiles (Jonathan Kim kick) Tied 14–14; 11 plays, 75 yards, 5:40
- (00:00) MSU FG: Jonathan Kim 50-yard field goal MSU 17–14; 11 plays, 75 yards, 5:40

Third quarter

- (08:18) UMD FG: Jack Howes 28-yard field goal Tied 17–17; 7 plays, 53 yards, 2:44

Fourth quarter

- (14:54) UMD TD: Dylan Wade 28-yard pass from Billy Edwards Jr. (Jack Howes kick) UMD 24–17; 10 plays, 80 yards, 4:18
- (04:11) MSU TD: Nick Marsh 77-yard pass from Aidan Chiles (Jonathan Kim kick) Tied 24–24; 1 plays, 77 yards, 00:11
- (00:01) MSU FG: Jonathan Kim 37-yard field goal MSU 27–24; 13 plays, 65 yards, 2:11

Statistics	MSU	MD
First downs	26	21
Plays–yards	67–493	65–339
Rushes–yards	30–129	31–86
Passing yards	357	264
Passing: comp–att–int	24–39–3	26–34–1
Time of possession	27:31	32:29

Team	Category	Player	Statistics
Michigan State	Passing	Aidan Chiles	24/39, 363 yards, 3 TD, 3 INT
Michigan State	Rushing	Nate Carter	11 carries, 59 yards
Michigan State	Receiving	Nick Marsh	8 receptions, 194 yards, 1 TD
Maryland	Passing	Billy Edwards Jr.	26/34, 253 yards, 2 TD, 1 INT
Maryland	Rushing	Roman Hemby	12 carries, 35 yards
Maryland	Receiving	Tai Felton	11 receptions, 152 yards, 1 TD

=== vs Prairie View A&M ===
Prairie View A&M Panthers (FCS) (1–1) at Michigan State Spartans (2–0) – Game summary

Quarter	1	2	3	4	Total
Panthers (FCS)	0	0	0	0	0
Spartans	14	13	3	10	40

at Spartan Stadium • East Lansing, Michigan

- Date: September 14
- Game time: 3:30 p.m. EDT/12:30 p.m. PDT
- Game weather: 84 °F (29 °C), Wind: 8 mph W, Sunny
- Game attendance: 70,066
- Referee: Jason Nickleby
- TV announcers (BTN): Mark Followill (play-by-play), Anthony Herron (analyst), and Dannie Rogers (sideline)

Game information

First quarter

- (06:13) MSU TD: Aidan Chiles 6-yard run (Jonathan Kim kick) MSU 7–0; 11 plays, 60 yards, 6:11
- (00:07) MSU TD: Aziah Johnson 17-yard pass from Aidan Chiles (Jonathan Kim kick) MSU 14–0; 9 plays, 69 yards, 4:16

Second quarter

- (04:45) MSU TD: Nate Carter 60-yard run (Jonathan Kim kick) MSU 21–0; 5 plays, 80 yards, 2:58
- (00:42) MSU TD: Charles Brantley 100-yard interception return (Jonathan Kim miss) MSU 27–0

Third quarter

- (08:24) MSU FG: Jonathan Kim 33-yard field goal MSU 30–0; 14 plays, 60 yards, 6:36

Fourth quarter

- (11:46) MSU FG: Jonathan Kim 23-yard field goal MSU 33–0; 12 plays, 84 yards, 7:04
- (03:49) MSU TD: Tommy Schuster 1-yard run (Tarik Ahmetbasic kick) MSU 40–0; 10 plays, 56 yards, 5:35

Statistics	PV	MSU
First downs	10	22
Plays–yards	44–140	63–458
Rushes–yards	27–17	34–188
Passing yards	123	270
Passing: comp–att–int	9–17–1	20–29–0
Time of possession	26:03	33:57

Team	Category	Player	Statistics
Prairie View A&M	Passing	Scooter Adams	9/17, 123 yards, 1 INT
Prairie View A&M	Rushing	Scooter Adams	5 carries, 24 yards
Prairie View A&M	Receiving	Tre'Jon Spiller	7 receptions, 91 yards
Michigan State	Passing	Aidan Chiles	12/19, 173 yards, 1 TD
Michigan State	Rushing	Nate Carter	8 carries, 91 yards, 1 TD
Michigan State	Receiving	Aziah Johnson	2 receptions, 50 yards, 1 TD

=== at Boston College ===
Michigan State Spartans (3–0) at Boston College Eagles (2–1) – Game summary

Quarter	1	2	3	4	Total
Spartans	3	10	3	3	19
Eagles	0	6	10	7	23

at Alumni Stadium • Chestnut Hill, Massachusetts

- Date: September 21
- Game time: 8:00 p.m. EDT/5:00 p.m. PDT
- Game weather: 58 °F (14 °C), Rainy
- Game attendance: 44,500
- Referee: Mark Kluczynski
- TV announcers (ACCN): Wes Durham (play-by-play), Tom Luginbill (analyst), and Dana Boyle (sideline)

Game information

First quarter

- (09:11) MSU FG: Jonathan Kim 41-yard field goal MSU 3–0; 9 plays, 26 yards, 3:48

Second quarter

- (12:22) BC TD: Turbo Richard 11-yard run (Luca Lombardo miss) BC 6–3; 11 plays, 64 yards, 6:08
- (08:10) MSU TD: Aidan Chiles 1-yard run (Jonathan Kim kick) MSU 10–6; 9 plays, 75 yards, 4:12
- (00:20) MSU FG: Jonathan Kim 26-yard field goal MSU 13–6; 8 plays, 51 yards, 1:23

Third quarter

- (12:35) BC FG: Luca Lombardo 39-yard field goal MSU 13–9; 4 plays, 16 yards, 2:04
- (12:22) BC TD: Treshaun Ward 36-yard run (Luca Lombardo kick) BC 16–13; 1 plays, 36 yards, 00:08
- (09:06) MSU FG: Jonathan Kim 51-yard field goal Tied 16–16; 8 plays, 42 yards, 3:14

Fourth quarter

- (04:12) MSU FG: Jonathan Kim 27-yard field goal MSU 19–16; 18 plays, 89 yards, 9:24
- (01:28) BC TD: Lewis Bond 42-yard pass from Thomas Castellanos (Luca Lombardo kick) BC 23–19; 6 plays, 75 yards, 2:44

Statistics	MSU	BC
First downs	21	16
Plays–yards	68–368	60–292
Rushes–yards	33–127	44–152
Passing yards	241	140
Passing: comp–att–int	17–35–3	10–16–0
Time of possession	32:30	27:30

Team	Category	Player	Statistics
Michigan State	Passing	Aidan Chiles	17/35, 241 yards, 3 INT
Michigan State	Rushing	Kay'Ron Lynch-Adams	15 carries, 61 yards
Michigan State	Receiving	Montorie Foster	4 receptions, 87 yards
Boston College	Passing	Thomas Castellanos	10/16, 140 yards, 1 TD
Boston College	Rushing	Treshaun Ward	14 carries, 102 yards, 1 TD
Boston College	Receiving	Lewis Bond	6 receptions, 102 yards, 1 TD

=== vs No. 3 Ohio State ===
No. 3 Ohio State Buckeyes (3–0) vs Michigan State Spartans (3–1) – Game summary

Quarter	1	2	3	4	Total
No. 3 Buckeyes	3	21	14	0	38
Spartans	0	7	0	0	7

at Spartan Stadium • East Lansing, Michigan

- Date: September 28
- Game time: 7:30 p.m. EDT/4:30 p.m. PDT
- Game weather: 67 °F (19 °C), Wind: 9 mph NE, Cloudy
- Game attendance: 71,114
- Referee: Kole Knueppel
- TV announcers (Peacock): Andrew Siciliano (play-by-play), Colt McCoy (analyst), and Lewis Johnson (sideline)

Game information

First quarter

- (09:15) OSU FG: Jayden Fielding 30-yard field goal OSU 3–0; 11 plays, 63 yards, 5:45

Second quarter

- (14:04) OSU TD: Gee Scott Jr. 3-yard pass from Will Howard (Jayden Fielding kick) OSU 10–0; 14 plays, 80 yards, 6:08
- (09:41) MSU TD: Jaron Glover 12-yard pass from Aidan Chiles (Jonathan Kim kick) OSU 10–7; 1 plays, 12 yards, 00:07
- (07:22) OSU TD: Jeremiah Smith 19-yard run (Jayden Fielding kick) OSU 17–7; 4 plays, 75 yards, 2:19
- (00:29) OSU TD: Jeremiah Smith 17-yard pass from Devin Brown (Jayden Fielding kick) OSU 24–7; 6 plays, 60 yards, 00:44

Third quarter

- (04:57) OSU TD: Emeka Egbuka 33-yard pass from Will Howard (Jayden Fielding kick) OSU 31–7; 13 plays, 76 yards, 7:11
- (02:05) OSU TD: Will Howard 6-yard run (Jayden Fielding kick) OSU 38–7; 3 plays, 12 yards, 1:19

Fourth quarter

- No scoring

Statistics	OSU	MSU
First downs	23	13
Plays–yards	75–483	51–246
Rushes–yards	35–185	26–47
Passing yards	289	199
Passing: comp–att–int	26–40–1	16–25–1
Time of possession	35:43	24:17

Team	Category	Player	Statistics
Ohio State	Passing	Will Howard	21/31, 244 yards, 2 TD, 1 INT
Ohio State	Rushing	TreVeyon Henderson	7 carries, 69 yards
Ohio State	Receiving	Emeka Egbuka	7 receptions, 96 yards, 1 TD
Michigan State	Passing	Aidan Chiles	13/19, 167 yards, 1 TD, 1 INT
Michigan State	Rushing	Kay'Ron Lynch-Adams	9 carries, 35 yards
Michigan State	Receiving	Jaron Glover	4 receptions, 53 yards, 1 TD

=== at No. 6 Oregon ===
Michigan State Spartans (3–2) at No. 6 Oregon Ducks (4–0) – Game summary

Quarter	1	2	3	4	Total
Spartans	0	0	0	10	10
No. 6 Ducks	7	14	3	7	31

at Autzen Stadium • Eugene, Oregon

- Date: October 4
- Game time: 9:00 p.m. EDT/6:00 p.m. PDT
- Game weather: 60 °F (16 °C), Wind: 6 mph NE, Sunny
- Game attendance: 59,802
- Referee: Bryan Banks
- TV announcers (FOX): Jason Benetti (play-by-play), Brock Huard (analyst), and Allison Williams (sideline)

Game information

First quarter

- (0:22) ORE TD: Dillon Gabriel 9-yard run (Atticus Sappington kick) ORE 7–0; 7 plays, 75 yards, 3:30

Second quarter

- (5:26) ORE TD: Jordan James 3-yard run (Andrew Boyle kick) ORE 14–0; 7 plays, 55 yards, 3:45
- (0:05) ORE TD: Evan Stewart 9-yard pass from Dillon Gabriel (Atticus Sappington kick) ORE 21–0; 12 plays, 73 yards, 1:48

Third quarter

- (6:47) ORE FG: Andrew Boyle 50-yard field goal ORE 24–0; 9 plays, 48 yards, 3:48

Fourth quarter

- (11:18) ORE TD: Tez Johnson 2-yard pass from Dillon Gabriel (Atticus Sappington kick) ORE 31–0; 15 plays, 64 yards, 8:07
- (8:27) MSU TD: Kay'Ron Adams-Lynch 1-yard run (Jonathan Kim kick) ORE 31–7; 7 plays, 75 yards, 2:51
- (0:25) MSU FG: Jonathan Kim 42-yard field goal ORE 31–10; 11 plays, 45 yards, 6:12

Statistics	MSU	ORE
First downs	16	25
Plays–yards	52–250	71–477
Rushes–yards	30–59	37–213
Passing yards	191	264
Passing: comp–att–int	15–22–0	21–34–2
Time of possession	29:02	30:58

Team	Category	Player	Statistics
Michigan State	Passing	Aidan Chiles	10/17, 154 yards
Michigan State	Rushing	Kay'Ron Lynch-Adams	9 carries, 32 yards, TD
Michigan State	Receiving	Nick Marsh	3 receptions, 58 yards
Oregon	Passing	Dillon Gabriel	20/32, 257 yards, 2 TD, 2 INT
Oregon	Rushing	Jordan James	24 carries, 166 yards, TD
Oregon	Receiving	Tez Johnson	10 receptions, 84 yards, TD

=== vs Iowa ===
Iowa Hawkeyes (4–2) vs Michigan State Spartans (3–3) – Game summary

Quarter	1	2	3	4	Total
Hawkeyes	0	0	14	6	20
Spartans	6	6	7	13	32

at Spartan Stadium • East Lansing, Michigan

- Date: October 19
- Game time: 7:30 p.m. EDT/4:30 p.m. PDT
- Game weather: 60 °F (16 °C), Wind: 4 mph SW, Clear
- Game attendance: 69,682
- Referee: Ron Snodgrass
- TV announcers (NBC): Noah Eagle (play-by-play), Todd Blackledge (analyst), and Kathryn Tappen (sideline)

Game information

First quarter

- (11:02) MSU FG: Jonathan Kim 42-yard field goal MSU 3–0; 8 plays, 52 yards, 3:58
- (05:58) MSU FG: Jonathan Kim 43-yard field goal MSU 6–0; 9 plays, 64 yards, 3:37

Second quarter

- (11:48) MSU FG: Jonathan Kim 36-yard field goal MSU 9–0; 7 plays, 42 yards, 5:58
- (02:28) MSU FG: Jonathan Kim 29-yard field goal MSU 12–0; 9 plays, 69 yards, 5:58
- (09:52) IOW TD: Reece Vander Zee 18-yard pass from Cade McNamara (Drew Stevens kick) MSU 12–7; 8 plays, 58 yards, 5:00

Third quarter

- (04:34) MSU TD: Montorie Foster Jr. 18-yard pass from Aidan Chiles (Jonathan Kim kick) MSU 19–7; 9 plays, 75 yards, 5:18
- (00:49) IOW TD: Brendan Sullivan 2-yard run (Drew Stevens kick) MSU 19–14; 8 plays, 69 yards, 3:39

Four quarter

- (11:52) MSU FG: Jonathan Kim 55-yard field goal MSU 22–14; 7 plays, 38 yards, 3:57
- (07:34) MSU FG: Jonathan Kim 46-yard field goal MSU 25–14; 6 plays, 2 yards, 3:18
- (07:22) IOW TD: Kaleb Johnson 75-yard run (two-point conversion pass failed) MSU 25–20; 1 plays, 75 yards, 00:12
- (02:03) MSU TD: Nate Carter 1-yard run (Jonathan Kim kick) MSU 32–20; 9 plays, 75 yards, 5:19

Statistics	IOWA	MSU
First downs	12	27
Plays–yards	46–283	70–468
Rushes–yards	23–133	40–212
Passing yards	150	256
Passing: comp–att–int	11–23–1	22–30–1
Time of possession	20:16	39:44

Team	Category	Player	Statistics
Iowa	Passing	Cade McNamara	11/23, 150 yards, 1 TD, 1 INT
Iowa	Rushing	Kaleb Johnson	14 carries, 98 yards, 1 TD
Iowa	Receiving	Kaleb Johnson	4 receptions, 49 yards
Michigan State	Passing	Aidan Chiles	22/30, 256 yards, 1 TD, 1 INT
Michigan State	Rushing	Kay'Ron Lynch-Adams	15 carries, 86 yards
Michigan State	Receiving	Nick Marsh	8 receptions, 113 yards

=== at Michigan (rivalry) ===
Michigan State Spartans (4–3) at Michigan Wolverines (4–3) – Game summary

Quarter	1	2	3	4	Total
Spartans	7	0	3	7	17
Wolverines	0	9	7	8	24

at Michigan Stadium • Ann Arbor, Michigan

- Date: October 26
- Game time: 7:30 p.m. EDT/4:30 p.m. PDT
- Game weather: 46 °F (8 °C), Wind: 5 mph N, Clear
- Game attendance: 110,849
- Referee: Larry Smith
- TV announcers (BTN): Jeff Levering (play-by-play), Jake Butt (analyst), and Brooke Fletcher (sideline)

Game information

First quarter

- (00:10) MSU TD: Nate Carter 2-yard run (Jonathan Kim kick) MSU 7–0; 9 plays, 62 yards, 5:13

Second quarter

- (00:29) UM TD: Colston Loveland 10-yard pass from Davis Warren (two-point conversion pass failed) MSU 7–6; 10 plays, 64 yards, 2:29
- (00:02) UM FG: Dominic Zvada 37-yard field goal UM 9–7; 2 plays, 15 yards, 00:12

Third quarter

- (09:49) UM TD: Alex Orji 2-yard run (Dominic Zvada kick) UM 16–7; 11 plays, 75 yards, 5:11
- (03:45) MSU FG: Jonathan Kim 46-yard field goal UM 16–10; 10 plays, 67 yards, 6:04

Fourth quarter

- (13:20) UM TD: Colston Loveland 23-yard pass from Donovan Edwards (two-point conversion pass Colston Loveland from Donovan Edwards) UM 24–10; 10 plays, 64 yards, 2:29
- (06:12) MSU TD: Nick Marsh 20-yard pass from Aidan Chiles (Jonathan Kim kick) UM 24–17; 13 plays, 75 yards, 7:08

Statistics	MSU	MICH
First downs	18	17
Plays–yards	65–352	51–265
Rushes–yards	42–163	31–119
Passing yards	189	265
Passing: comp–att–int	17–23–0	14–20–0
Time of possession	37:05	22:55

Team	Category	Player	Statistics
Michigan State	Passing	Aidan Chiles	17/23, 189 yards, 1 TD
Michigan State	Rushing	Nate Carter	19 carries, 118 yards, 1 TD
Michigan State	Receiving	Nate Carter	2 receptions, 56 yards
Michigan	Passing	Davis Warren	13/19, 123 yards, 1 TD
Michigan	Rushing	Alex Orji	6 carries, 64 yards, 1 TD
Michigan	Receiving	Colston Loveland	6 receptions, 67 yards, 2 TD

=== vs No. 13 Indiana (rivalry) ===
No. 13 Indiana Hoosiers (8–0) vs Michigan State Spartans (4–4) – Game summary

Quarter	1	2	3	4	Total
No. 13 Hoosiers	0	21	12	14	47
Spartans	10	0	0	0	10

at Spartan Stadium • East Lansing, Michigan

- Date: November 2
- Game time: 3:30 p.m. EDT/12:30 p.m. PDT.
- Game weather: 52 °F (11 °C), Sunny
- Game attendance: 68,423
- Referee: Mark Kluczynski
- TV announcers (Peacock): Paul Burmeister (play-by-play), Colt McCoy (analyst), and Zora Stephenson (sideline)

Game information

First quarter

- (09:58) MSU FG: Jonathan Kim 47-yard field goal MSU 3–0; 8 plays, 52 yards, 3:36
- (02:39) MSU TD: Nick Marsh 18-yard pass from Aidan Chiles (Jonathan Kim kick) MSU 10–0; 13 plays, 71 yards, 6:18

Second quarter

- (14:13) IND TD: Zach Horton 17-yard pass from Kurtis Rourke (Nicolas Radicic kick) MSU 10–7; 7 plays, 75 yards, 3:26
- (06:22) IND TD: Ty Lawton 1-yard run (Nicolas Radicic kick) IND 14–10; 4 plays, 64 yards, 2:13
- (02:10) IND TD: Elijah Sarratt 4-yard pass from Kurtis Rourke (Nicolas Radicic kick) IND 21–10; 7 plays, 75 yards, 3:26

Third quarter

- (13:28) IND SF: D'Angelo Ponds blocked punt Ryan Eckley bat ball back of the end zone for safety IND 23–10
- (11:39) IND TD: Myles Price 18-yard pass from Kurtis Rourke (Nicolas Radicic kick) IND 30–10; 6 plays, 65 yards, 1:43
- (02:43) IND FG: Nicolas Radicic 29-yard field goal IND 33–10; 6 plays, 65 yards, 1:43

Fourth quarter

- (14:05) IND TD: Omar Cooper Jr. 16-yard run (Nicolas Radicic kick) IND 40–10; 2 plays, 21 yards, 00:49
- (10:52) IND TD: Elijah Sarratt 11-yard pass from Kurtis Rourke (Nicolas Radicic kick) MSU 47–10; 5 plays, 37 yards, 1:37

Statistics	IU	MSU
First downs	20	15
Plays–yards	61–385	63–193
Rushes–yards	32–122	31– -36
Passing yards	263	229
Passing: comp–att–int	19–29–0	20–32–2
Time of possession	29:34	30:26

Team	Category	Player	Statistics
Indiana	Passing	Kurtis Rourke	19/29, 263 yards, 4 TD
Indiana	Rushing	Justice Ellison	9 carries, 32 yards
Indiana	Receiving	Ke'Shawn Williams	6 receptions, 86 yards
Michigan State	Passing	Aidan Chiles	16/24, 193 yards, 1 TD, 2 INT
Michigan State	Rushing	Alante Brown	2 carries, 16 yards
Michigan State	Receiving	Nick Marsh	5 receptions, 78 yards, 1 TD

=== at Illinois ===
Michigan State Spartans (4–5) at Illinois Fighting Illini (6–3) – Game summary

Quarter	1	2	3	4	Total
Spartans	6	3	7	0	16
Fighting Illini	14	7	3	14	38

at Memorial Stadium • Champaign, Illinois

- Date: November 16
- Game time: 2:30 p.m. EST/11:30 a.m. PST
- Game weather: 51 °F (11 °C), Wind: 13 mph SE, Cloudy
- Game attendance: 52,660
- Referee: Chris Coyte
- TV announcers (FS1): Alex Faust (play-by-play) and Robert Smith (analyst)

Game information

First quarter

- (09:52) ILL TD: Pat Bryant 57-yard pass from Luke Altmyer (David Olano kick) ILL 7–0; 2 plays, 74 yards, 1:04
- (07:53) MSU TD: Aziah Johnson 52-yard pass from Aidan Chiles (Jonathan Kim miss) ILL 7–6; 4 plays, 75 yards, 1:59
- (01:06) ILL TD: Josh McCray 11-yard run (David Olano kick) ILL 14–6; 13 plays, 75 yards, 6:47

Second quarter

- (02:01) ILL TD: Zakhari Franklin 4-yard pass from Luke Altmyer (David Olano kick) ILL 21–6; 12 plays, 64 yards, 6:09
- (01:02) MSU FG: Jonathan Kim 38-yard field goal ILL 21–9; 9 plays, 55 yards, 00:59

Third quarter

- (09:35) MSU TD: Nate Carter 5-yard pass from Aidan Chiles (Jonathan Kim kick) ILL 21–16; 10 plays, 75 yards, 5:25
- (05:45) ILL FG: David Olano 37-yard field goal ILL 24–16; 8 plays, 56 yards, 3:50

Four quarter

- (07:30) ILL TD: Josh McCray 1-yard run (David Olano kick) ILL 31–16; 8 plays, 49 yards, 5:16
- (01:56) ILL TD: Josh McCray 1-yard run (David Olano kick) ILL 38–16; 4 plays, 38 yards, 2:10

Statistics	MSU	ILL
First downs	18	18
Plays–yards	68–343	63–369
Rushes–yards	28–87	31–138
Passing yards	256	231
Passing: comp–att–int	23–40–0	19–32–0
Time of possession	28:32	31:28

Team	Category	Player	Statistics
Michigan State	Passing	Aidan Chiles	23/40, 256 yards, 2 TD
Michigan State	Rushing	Aidan Chiles	12 carries, 40 yards
Michigan State	Receiving	Montorie Foster Jr.	6 receptions, 76 yards
Illinois	Passing	Luke Altmyer	19/32, 231 yards, 2 TD
Illinois	Rushing	Josh McCray	9 carries, 61 yards, 3 TD
Illinois	Receiving	Pat Bryant	4 receptions, 135 yards, 1 TD

=== vs Purdue ===
Purdue Boilermakers (1–9) vs Michigan State Spartans (4–6) – Game summary

Quarter	1	2	3	4	Total
Boilermakers	3	0	7	7	17
Spartans	7	17	0	0	24

at Spartan Stadium • East Lansing, Michigan

- Date: November 22
- Game time: 8:00 p.m. EST/5:00 p.m. PST
- Game weather: 43 °F (6 °C), Wind: 15 mph NW, Cloudy
- Game attendance: 57,558
- Referee: Kole Knueppel
- TV announcers (FOX): Connor Onion (play-by-play) and Mark Helfrich (analyst)

Game information

First quarter

- (09:17) PUR FG: Ben Freehill 40-yard field goal PUR 3–0; 11 plays, 53 yards, 5:43
- (04:24) MSU TD: Montorie Foster Jr. 7-yard pass from Aidan Chiles (Jonathan Kim kick) MSU 7–3; 11 plays, 75 yards, 4:53

Second quarter

- (12:07) MSU FG: Jonathan Kim 43-yard field goal MSU 10–3; 8 plays, 33 yards, 3:45
- (07:45) MSU TD: Nate Carter 2-yard run (Jonathan Kim kick) MSU 17–3; 8 plays, 33 yards, 3:45

Third quarter

- (00:41) MSU TD: Nate Carter 20-yard pass from Aidan Chiles (Jonathan Kim kick) MSU 24–3; 10 plays, 84 yards, 1:55

Four quarter

- (05:49) PUR TD: Devin Mockobee 2-yard run (Ben Freehill kick) MSU 24–10; 10 plays, 73 yards, 5:24
- (13:54) PUR TD: Max Klare 7-yard pass from Hudson Card (Ben Freehill kick) MSU 24–17; 10 plays, 85 yards, 3:40

Statistics	PUR	MSU
First downs	19	22
Plays–yards	66–338	69–293
Rushes–yards	19– -4	38–134
Passing yards	342	159
Passing: comp–att–int	26–47–1	15–31–0
Time of possession	27:41	32:19

Team	Category	Player	Statistics
Purdue	Passing	Hudson Card	26/47, 342 yards, 1 TD, 1 INT
Purdue	Rushing	Devin Mockobee	9 carries, 14 yards, 1 TD
Purdue	Receiving	Jahmal Edrine	5 receptions, 87 yards
Michigan State	Passing	Aidan Chiles	15/31, 159 yards, 2 TD
Michigan State	Rushing	Kay'Ron Lynch-Adams	18 carries, 85 yards
Michigan State	Receiving	Montorie Foster Jr.	4 receptions, 59 yards, 1 TD

=== vs Rutgers ===
Rutgers Scarlet Knights (6–5) vs Michigan State Spartans (5–6) – Game summary

Quarter	1	2	3	4	Total
Scarlet Knights	10	13	8	10	41
Spartans	7	0	0	7	14

at Spartan Stadium • East Lansing, Michigan

- Date: November 30
- Game time: 3:30 p.m. EST/12:30 p.m. PST
- Game weather: 24 °F (−4 °C), Wind: 11 mph W, Snow
- Game attendance: 50,038
- Referee: Tim O'Dey
- TV announcers (FS1): Dan Hellie and Petros Papadakis

Game information

First quarter

- (12:26) MSU TD: Nate Carter 26-yard run (Jonathan Kim kick) MSU 7–0; 5 plays, 75 yards, 2:34
- (09:45) RUT TD: Kyle Monangai 7-yard run (Jai Patel kick) Tied 7–7; 5 plays, 50 yards, 2:41
- (07:29) RUT FG: Jai Patel 25-yard field goal RUT 10–7; 4 plays, -4 yards, 00:52

Second quarter

- (06:02) RUT TD: Antwan Raymond 13-yard run (Jai Patel kick) RUT 17–7; 8 plays, 94 yards, 3:59
- (01:17) RUT FG: Jai Patel 42-yard field goal RUT 20–7; 10 plays, 46 yards, 3:42
- (00:00) RUT FG: Jai Patel 30-yard field goal RUT 23–7; 9 plays, 41 yards, 00:49

Third quarter

- (07:26) RUT TD: Ian Strong 9-yard pass from Athan Kaliakmanis (two-point conversion pass KJ Duff from Athan Kaliakmanis) RUT 31–7; 14 plays, 75 yards, 7:34

Fourth quarter

- (10:55) RUT FG: Jai Patel 29-yard field goal RUT 34–7; 12 plays, 46 yards, 7:04
- (07:21) MSU TD: Jack Velling 5-yard pass from Aidan Chiles (Jonathan Kim kick) RUT 34–14; 7 plays, 75 yards, 3:34
- (01:57) RUT TD: Antwan Raymond 5-yard run (Jai Patel kick) RUT 41–14; 7 plays, 56 yards, 5:21

Statistics	RUTG	MSU
First downs	24	13
Plays–yards	70–365	48–253
Rushes–yards	48–208	24–103
Passing yards	157	150
Passing: comp–att–int	13–22–0	13–24–1
Time of possession	35:08	24:52

Team	Category	Player	Statistics
Rutgers	Passing	Athan Kaliakmanis	13/22, 157 yards, TD
Rutgers	Rushing	Kyle Monangai	31 carries, 129 yards, TD
Rutgers	Receiving	Ian Strong	5 receptions, 63 yards, TD
Michigan State	Passing	Aidan Chiles	13/23, 150 yards, TD
Michigan State	Rushing	Kay'Ron Lynch-Adams	9 carries, 69 yards
Michigan State	Receiving	Jack Velling	5 receptions, 77 yards, TD

== Personnel ==
=== Roster ===
2024 Michigan State Spartans football team roster
Players
Coaches
Offense

Pos.	#	Name	Class
WR	0	Alante Brown	RSr
WR	1	Antonio Gates Jr.	RSo
QB	2	Aidan Chiles	So
WR	3	Montorie Foster Jr.	RSr
WR	4	Jaron Glover	RSo
RB	5	Nate Carter	RJr
WR	6	Nick Marsh	Fr
WR	9	Jaelen Smith	RFr
QB	10	Tommy Schuster	GS
WR	11	Aziah Johnson	RFr
TE	12	Jack Velling	Jr
TE	13	Ademola Faleye	RJr
QB	14	Alessio Milivojevic	Fr
RB	15	Kay'Ron Lynch-Adams	GS
QB	16	Ryland Jessee	Fr
QB	18	Atticus Carridine	Fr
RB	20	Shawn Foster	So
WR	22	Jack Yanachik	RFr
RB	25	Joseph Martinez	RSr
RB	26	Brandon Tullis	Fr
RB	26	Chris Williams	RSo
RB	27	Makhi Frazier	Fr
RB	33	Jaxon McCaig	Fr
RB	44	Jay Coyne	RSo
TE	48	Charlie Baker	Fr
TE	49	Reeves Taylor	Fr
OL	53	Brandon Baldwin	RSr
OL	54	Cooper Terpstra	RFr
OL	55	Rakeem Johnson	Fr
OL	56	Cole Dellinger	RFr
OL	59	Kyler Brunan	Fr
OL	61	Tanner Miller	GS
OL	63	Payton Stewart	Fr
OL	65	Stanton Ramil	RFr
OL	66	Ashton Lepo	RSo
OL	67	Hayden Lorius	Fr
OL	68	Gavin Broscious	RSo
OL	69	Jacob Merritt	RSo
OL	70	Luke Newman	RSo
OL	71	Kristian Phillips	RSo
OL	72	Dallas Fincher	RSr
OL	73	Rustin Young	Fr
OL	75	Charlton Luniewski	Fr
OL	77	Andrew Dennis	Fr
OL	79	Mercer Luniewski	Fr
WR	80	Zach Gillespie	RSr
TE	81	Michael Masunas	RSo
TE	82	Brennan Paracheck	So
TE	84	Wyatt Hook	Fr
WR	85	Grant Calcagno	RFr
WR	86	Jaylan Brown	Fr
WR	87	Dyson Sims	Fr
WR	89	Austin Clay	Fr

Defense

Pos.	#	Name	Class
DB	0	Charles Brantley	RJr
DB	1	Nikai Martinez	Jr
DL	2	Khris Bogle	RSr
DB	3	Jeremiah Hughes	So
DB	4	Ed Woods	RSr
LB	5	Jordan Hall	So
DB	6	Ade Willie	Jr
LB	7	Jordan Turner	RSr
DL	8	Anthony Jones	RSo
DL	9	Jalen Thompson	So
LB	10	Wayne Matthews III	RJr
DL	11	Ken Talley	RSo
DB	12	Justin Denson Jr.	Fr
DB	13	Caleb Coley	RSo
DB	14	Lejond Cavazos	RJr
DB	15	Angelo Grose	RSr
DB	16	Jaylen Thompson	Fr
LB	17	Semaj Bridgeman	RFr
DB	18	Andrew Brinson IV	Fr
DB	19	Armorion Smith	RJr
DB	20	Keshawn Williams	Fr
DB	21	Dillon Tatum	Jr
DB	22	Tyler Gillison	RSo
LB	23	Darius Snow	RJr
DB	24	Shawn Smith	RSo
DB	25	Chase Rucker	So
DL	26	Stone Chaney	Fr
LB	27	Cal Haladay	RSr
DB	28	Philipp Davis	RFr
DB	30	Aveon Grose	RSo
DB	31	DJ Kennard	Fr
DL	32	James Schott	RSo
LB	33	Aaron Alexander	RSo
DB	34	Khalil Majeed	RJr
LB	35	Sam Edwards	RSr
DB	36	Brandon Lewis	RFr
DB	38	Dorian Davis	RSo
DB	39	Caleb Gash	RFr
LB	42	David Millikin	RSo
DB	43	Malik Spencer	Jr
LB	44	Marcellius Pulliam	So
LB	45	Brady Pretzlaf	Fr
DL	47	Jaxson Wilson	RFr
LB	49	Carter Enyard	Fr
DL	52	Mikeshun Beeler	Fr
DL	55	Ben Roberts	RSo
LB	56	Chris Piwowarczyk	Fr
DL	57	Mason Nickel	Fr
DL	75	Ben Nelson	RSo
DL	87	Luke DeJager	Fr
DL	88	Ru'Quan Buckley	RJr
DL	91	Alex VanSumeren	RSo
DL	92	Kekai Burnett	Fr
DL	93	Jalen Satchell	RJr
DL	94	D'Quan Douse	RSr
DL	97	Maverick Hansen	RSr
DL	98	Avery Dunn	RSo
DL	99	Quindarius Dunnigan	RSr

Special teams

Pos.	#	Name	Class
K	29	Martin Connington	Fr
K	40	Tarik Ahmetbasic	RFr
LS	47	Kaden Schickel	RJr
P	48	Carson Voss	RJr
LS	83	Jack Carson Wentz	So
P	96	Ryan Eckley	RSo
K	97	Jonathan Kim	RSr

Head coach

Jonathan Smith

Coordinators/assistant coaches

- Keith Bhonapha (Assistant Head Coach/Co-Special Teams Coordinator/Running Backs)
- Brian Lindgren (Offensive Coordinator/Quarterbacks Coach)
- Joe Rossi (Defensive Coordinator/Linebackers Coach)
- Jim Michalczik (Offensive Line Coach/Run Game Coordinator)
- Blue Adams (Secondary Coach)
- Courtney Hawkins (Wide Receivers Coach)
- Demetrice Martin (Cornerbacks Coach)
- Legi Suiaunoa (Defensive Line Coach)
- Chad Wilt (Co-Special Teams Coordinator/Rush Ends Coach)
- Brian Wozniak (Tight Ends Coach/Recruiting Coordinator)

Legend

- (C) Team captain
- (S) Suspended
- (I) Ineligible
- Injured
- Redshirt

Roster
Last update: August 13, 2024

=== Coaching staff ===
Name	Position	Season
Jonathan Smith	Head Coach	1st
Keith Bhonapha	Assistant Head Coach/Co-Special Teams Coordinator/Running Backs	1st
Brian Lindgren	Offensive Coordinator/Quarterbacks Coach	1st
Joe Rossi	Defensive Coordinator/Linebackers Coach	1st
Jim Michalczik	Offensive Line Coach/Run Game Coordinator	1st
Blue Adams	Secondary Coach	1st
Courtney Hawkins	Wide Receivers Coach	5th
Demetrice Martin	Cornerbacks Coach	1st
Legi Suiaunoa	Defensive Line Coach	1st
Chad Wilt	Co-Special Teams Coordinator/Rush Ends Coach	1st
Brian Wozniak	Tight Ends Coach/Recruiting Coordinator	1st
