= 2023 Michigan State Spartans football team =

American college football season

2023 Michigan State Spartans football
- Conference: Big Ten Conference
- East Division
- Record: 0–8, 4 wins vacated (0–7, 2 wins vacated Big Ten)
- Head coach: Mel Tucker (4th season; first 2 games); Harlon Barnett (interim)
- Offensive coordinator: Jay Johnson (4th season)
- Offensive scheme: Multiple
- Defensive coordinator: Scottie Hazelton (4th season)
- Base defense: 4–3
- Home stadium: Spartan Stadium

Uniform
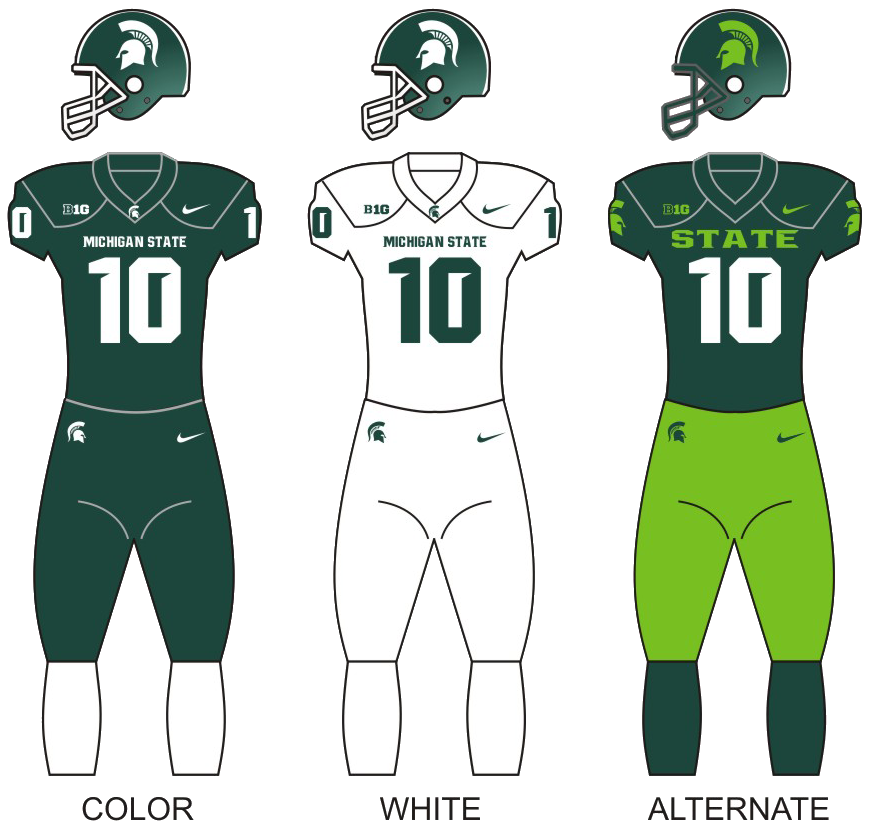

2023 Big Ten Conference football standings
	Conf.			Overall
Team	W		L	W		L
East Division
No. 1 Michigan xy$#^	9	–	0	15	–	0
No. 10 Ohio State	8	–	1	11	–	2
No. 13 Penn State	7	–	2	10	–	3
Maryland	4	–	5	8	–	5
Rutgers	3	–	6	7	–	6
Indiana	1	–	8	3	–	9
Michigan State†	0	–	7	0	–	8
West Division
No. 24 Iowa xy	7	–	2	10	–	4
Northwestern	5	–	4	8	–	5
Wisconsin	5	–	4	7	–	6
Minnesota	3	–	6	6	–	7
Illinois	3	–	6	5	–	7
Nebraska	3	–	6	5	–	7
Purdue	3	–	6	4	–	8
Championship: Michigan 26, Iowa 0
# – College Football Playoff champion; ^ – College Football Playoff participant; $ – Conference champion; x – Division champion/co-champions; y – Championship game participant; † — NCAA vacated all wins for Michigan State (4–8, 2–7); Rankings from AP Poll

The 2023 Michigan State Spartans football team represented Michigan State University in the East Division of the Big Ten Conference during the 2023 NCAA Division I FBS football season. The Spartans played their home games at Spartan Stadium in East Lansing, Michigan.

The Spartans were led by Mel Tucker through the first two games of the season; Tucker was suspended without pay on September 10 and was fired for cause on September 27 following disclosures relating to alleged sexual harassment. Defensive backs coach Harlon Barnett was appointed interim head coach, and former head coach Mark Dantonio agreed to return as the team's associate head coach.

The Spartans finished the season 4–8, 2–7 in Big Ten play to finish in sixth place in the East division. They failed to qualify for a bowl game for the third time in four years. In a 49-0 defeat, the Spartans would also suffer their worst home loss in program history to rival Michigan. On November 12, 2025, the 4 wins were vacated as a result of an NCAA settlement over recruiting violations during Mel Tucker's tenure.

On November 26, the school named Oregon State head coach Jonathan Smith the team's new head coach.

== Schedule ==
Date	Time	Opponent	Site	TV	Result	Attendance
September 1	7:00 p.m.	Central Michigan*	Spartan Stadium; East Lansing, MI	FS1	W 31–7 (vacated)	73,216
September 9	3:30 p.m.	Richmond*	Spartan Stadium; East Lansing, MI	BTN	W 45–14 (vacated)	70,049
September 16	5:00 p.m.	No. 8 Washington*	Spartan Stadium; East Lansing, MI	Peacock	L 7–41	70,528
September 23	3:30 p.m.	Maryland^{†}	Spartan Stadium; East Lansing, MI	NBC	L 9–31	70,131
September 30	7:30 p.m.	at Iowa	Kinnick Stadium; Iowa City, IA	NBC	L 16–26	69,250
October 14	12:00 p.m.	at Rutgers	SHI Stadium; Piscataway, NJ	BTN	L 24–27	52,879
October 21	7:30 p.m.	No. 2 Michigan	Spartan Stadium; East Lansing, MI (rivalry)	NBC	L 0–49	74,206
October 28	3:30 p.m.	at Minnesota	Huntington Bank Stadium; Minneapolis, MN	BTN	L 12–27	47,392
November 4	12:00 p.m.	Nebraska	Spartan Stadium; East Lansing, MI	FS1	W 20–17 (vacated)	63,134
November 11	7:30 p.m.	at No. 1 Ohio State	Ohio Stadium; Columbus, OH	NBC	L 3–38	105,137
November 18	12:00 p.m.	at Indiana	Memorial Stadium; Bloomington, IN (rivalry)	BTN	W 24–21 (vacated)	40,666
November 24	7:30 p.m.	vs. No. 11 Penn State	Ford Field; Detroit, MI (rivalry)	NBC	L 0–42	51,927
*Non-conference game; ^{†}Homecoming; Rankings from AP Poll (and CFP Rankings, after October 31); All times are in Eastern time; Source:

== Game summaries ==
=== vs Central Michigan ===
Central Michigan Chippewas (0–0) at Michigan State Spartans (0–0) – Game summary

Quarter	1	2	3	4	Total
Chippewas	0	7	0	0	7
Spartans	0	10	7	14	31

at Spartan Stadium • East Lansing, Michigan

- Date: September 1st
- Game time: 7:00 p.m. EST/4:00 p.m. PST
- Game weather: 76 °F (24 °C), Wind: 4 mph S, Sunny
- Game attendance: 73,216
- Referee: Gregory Blum
- TV announcers (FS1): Tim Brando (play-by-play), Spencer Tillman (analyst)
- Sources

Game information

Second quarter

- (06:55) MSU FG: Jonathan Kim 47-yard field goal MSU 3–0; 5 plays, 16 yards, 1:22
- (01:51) CMU TD: Chris Parker 12-yard pass from Bert Emanuel Jr. (Tristan Mattson kick) CMU 7–3; 3 plays, 70 yards, 1:20
- (00:48) MSU TD: Nate Carter 2-yard run (Jonathan Kim kick ) MSU 10–7; 7 plays, 84 yards, 0:57

Third quarter

- (02:41) MSU TD: Jalen Berger 12-yard run (Jonathan Kim kick) MSU 17–7 MSU; 5 plays, 45 yards, 2:50

Fourth quarter

- (13:26) MSU TD: Tyrell Henry 10-yard pass from Noah Kim (Jonathan Kim kick) MSU 24–7; 3 plays, 82 yards, 1:24
- (09:05) MSU TD: Maliq Carr 8-yard pass from Noah Kim (Stephen Rusnak kick) MSU 31–7; 5 plays, 55 yards, 2:22

Statistics	Central Michigan	Michigan State
First downs	19	20
Plays–yards	67–219	64–406
Rushes–yards	41–123	25–127
Passing yards	96	279
Passing: comp–att–int	12–24–1	18–32–0
Turnovers		
Time of possession	34:26	25:34

Team	Category	Player	Statistics
Central Michigan	Passing	Bert Emanuel Jr.	11/17, 87 yards, 1 TD, 1 INT
Central Michigan	Rushing	Bert Emanuel Jr.	17 carries, 41 yards
Central Michigan	Receiving	Mitchel Collier	3 receptions, 30 yards
Michigan State	Passing	Noah Kim	18/31, 279 yards, 2 TD
Michigan State	Rushing	Nate Carter	18 carries, 113 yards, 1 TD
Michigan State	Receiving	Jaron Glover	3 receptions, 75 yards

=== vs Richmond ===
Richmond Spiders (FCS) (0–1) at Michigan State Spartans (1–0) – Game summary

Quarter	1	2	3	4	Total
Spiders (FCS)	0	0	0	14	14
Spartans	7	10	21	7	45

at Spartan Stadium • East Lansing, Michigan

- Date: September 9th
- Game time: 3:30 p.m. EST/12:30 p.m. PST
- Game weather: 67 °F (19 °C), Wind: 3 mph NE, Cloudy
- Game attendance: 70,049
- Referee: Tim O'Dey
- TV announcers (BTN): Chris Vosters (play-by-play), Matt Millen (analyst), and Dannie Rogers (sideline)

Game information

First quarter

- (7:26) MSU TD: Tre Mosley 11-yard pass from Noah Kim (Jonathan Kim kick) MSU 7–0; 5 plays, 19 yards, 2:31

Second quarter

- (13:44) MSU TD: Tyneil Hopper 13-yard pass from Noah Kim (Jonathan Kim kick) MSU 14–0; 8 plays, 69 yards, 2:41
- (05:17) MSU FG: Jonathan Kim 52-yard field goal MSU 17–0; 9 plays, 58 yards, 5:03

Third quarter

- (12:28) MSU TD: Nate Carter 2-yard run (Jonathan Kim kick) MSU 24–0; 5 plays, 65 yards, 2:26
- (8:25) MSU TD: Nate Carter 44-yard run (Jonathan Kim kick) MSU 31–0; 4 plays, 63 yards, 2:31
- (8:25) MSU TD: Nate Carter 6-yard run (Stephen Rusnak kick) MSU 38–0; 9 plays, 70 yards, 4:57

Fourth quarter

- (14:36) UR TD: Aaron Banks 47-yard fumble return (Jayden Alsheskie kick) MSU 38–7
- (11:33) MSU TD: Antonio Gates Jr. 45-yard pass from Noah Kim (Jonathan Kim kick) MSU 45–7; 6 plays, 69 yards, 2:55
- (5:16) UR TD: Sean Clarke 5-yard pass from Jackson Hardy (Jayden Alsheskie kick) MSU 45–14; 4 plays, 25 yards, 2:06

Statistics	Richmond (FCS)	Michigan State
First downs	11	21
Plays–yards	54–193	61–465
Rushes–yards	29–75	38–162
Passing yards	118	303
Passing: comp–att–int	18–25–0	19–23–0
Turnovers		
Time of possession	29:49	30:11

Team	Category	Player	Statistics
Richmond (FCS)	Passing	Kyle Wickersham	16/22, 102 yards
Richmond (FCS)	Rushing	Owen Laughlin	1 carries, 20 yards
Richmond (FCS)	Receiving	Jerry Garcia JR.	4 receptions, 34 yards
Michigan State	Passing	Noah Kim	18/22, 292 yards, 3 TD
Michigan State	Rushing	Nate Carter	19 carries, 111 yards, 3 TD
Michigan State	Receiving	Tre Mosley	5 receptions, 84 yards, 1 TD

=== vs No. 8 Washington ===
No. 8 Washington Huskies (2–0) at Michigan State Spartans (2–0) – Game summary

Quarter	1	2	3	4	Total
No. 8 Huskies	14	21	6	0	41
Spartans	0	0	0	7	7

at Spartan Stadium • East Lansing, Michigan

- Date: September 16th
- Game time: 5:00 p.m. EST/2:00 p.m. PST
- Game weather: 71 °F (22 °C) Wind: 3 mph SW, Sunny
- Game attendance: 70,528
- Referee: Matthew Richards
- TV announcers (Peacock): Brendan Burke (play-by-play), Chris Simms (analyst), and Caroline Pineda (sideline)

Game information

First quarter

- (09:51) UW TD: Germie Bernard 1-yard run (Grady Gross kick) UW 7–0; 4 plays, 55 yards, 2:12
- (01:14) UW TD: Jack Westover 5-yard pass from Michael Penix Jr. (Grady Gross kick) UW 14–0; 3 plays, 44 yards, 1:07

Second quarter

- (10:44) UW TD: Ja'Lynn Polk 30-yard pass from Michael Penix Jr. (Grady Gross kick) UW 21–0; 3 plays, 95 yards, 1:39
- (06:49) UW TD: Jack Westover 13-yard pass from Michael Penix Jr. (Grady Gross kick) UW 28–0; 4 plays, 48 yards, 1:41
- (00:06) UW TD: Jack Westover 7-yard pass from Michael Penix Jr. (Grady Gross kick) UW 35–0; 5 plays, 66 yards, 00:35

Third quarter

- (10:43) UW FG: Grady Gross 22-yard field goal UW 38–0; 8 plays, 66 yards, 4:10
- (03:45) UW FG: Grady Gross 29-yard field goal UW 41–0; 11 plays, 72 yards, 4:48

Fourth quarter

- (05:48) MSU TD: Katin Houser 4-yard run (Jonathan Kim kick) UW 41–7; 11 plays, 99 yards, 5:25

Statistics	Washington	Michigan State
First downs	26	15
Plays–yards	72–713	62–261
Rushes–yards	33–177	27–53
Passing yards	536	208
Passing: comp–att–int	29–39–1	14–35–1
Turnovers		
Time of possession	35:32	24:28

Team	Category	Player	Statistics
Washington	Passing	Michael Penix Jr.	27/35, 473 yards, 4 TD
Washington	Rushing	Tybo Rogers	15 carries, 74 yards
Washington	Receiving	Rome Odunze	8 receptions, 180 yards
Michigan State	Passing	Noah Kim	12/31, 136 yards, 1 INT
Michigan State	Rushing	Nate Carter	17 carries, 48 yards
Michigan State	Receiving	Christian Fitzpatrick	1 reception, 61 yards

=== vs Maryland ===
Maryland Terrapins (3–0) at Michigan State Spartans (2–1) – Game summary

Quarter	1	2	3	4	Total
Terrapins	7	14	0	10	31
Spartans	0	3	6	0	9

at Spartan Stadium • East Lansing, Michigan

- Date: September 23rd
- Game time: 3:30 p.m. EST/12:30 p.m. PST
- Game weather: 74 °F (23 °C) Wind: 10 mph W, Sunny
- Game attendance: 70,131
- Referee: Ron Snodgrass
- TV announcers (NBC): Jac Collinsworth (play-by-play), Jason Garrett (analyst), and Zora Stephenson (analyst)

Game information

First quarter

- (07:52) UMD TD: Sean Greeley 1-yard pass from Taulia Tagovailoa (Jack Howes kick) UMD 7–0; 9 plays, 45 yards, 4:24

Second quarter

- (11:28) UMD TD: Tyrese Chambers 12-yard pass from Taulia Tagovailoa (Jack Howes kick) UMD 14–0; 11 plays, 95 yards, 3:40
- (09:51) UMD TD: Taulia Tagovailoa 1-yard run (Jack Howes kick) UMD 21–0; 5 plays, 32 yards, 1:48
- (03:39) MSU FG: Jonathan Kim 37-yard field goal UMD 21–3; 10 plays, 56 yards, 5:00

Third quarter

- (03:44) MSU TD: Tyrell Henry 9-yard pass from Noah Kim, two-point conversion failed UMD 21–9; 9 plays, 80 yards, 3:46

Fourth quarter

- (03:18) UMD FG: Jack Howes 48-yard field goal UMD 24–9; 4 plays, 2 yards, 1:33
- (3:18) UMD TD: Octavian Smith Jr. 31-yard pass from Taulia Tagovailoa (Jack Howes kick) UMD 31–9; 7 plays, 81 yards, 2:30

Statistics	Maryland	Michigan State
First downs	19	25
Plays–yards	67–362	76–376
Rushes–yards	31–139	31–102
Passing yards	223	274
Passing: comp–att–int	21–36–1	26–45–3
Turnovers		
Time of possession	28:30	31:29

Team	Category	Player	Statistics
Maryland	Passing	Taulia Tagovailoa	21/36, 223 yards, 3 TD, 1 INT
Maryland	Rushing	Colby McDonald	5 carries, 38 yards
Maryland	Receiving	Tai Felton	3 receptions, 67 yards
Michigan State	Passing	Noah Kim	18/32, 190 yards, 1 TD, 2 INT
Michigan State	Rushing	Nate Carter	19 carries, 97 yards
Michigan State	Receiving	Montorie Foster Jr.	6 receptions, 67 yards

=== at Iowa ===
Michigan State Spartans (2–2) at Iowa Hawkeyes (3–1) – Game summary

Quarter	1	2	3	4	Total
Spartans	3	6	7	0	16
Hawkeyes	3	7	3	13	26

at Kinnick Stadium • Iowa City, Iowa

- Date: September 30th
- Game time: 7:30 p.m. EST/4:30 p.m. PST
- Game weather: 88 °F (31 °C), Wind: 10 mph SE, Sunny
- Game attendance: 69,250
- Referee: Mark Kluczynski
- TV announcers (NBC): Noah Eagle (play-by-play), Todd Blackledge (analyst), and Kathryn Tappen (sideline)

Game information

First quarter

- (11:25) UI FG: Drew Stevens 40-yard field goal UI 3–0; 8 plays, 53 yards, 3:35
- (03:48) MSU FG: Jonathan Kim 31-yard field goal Tied 3–3; 6 plays, 43 yards, 3:22

Second quarter

- (11:04) MSU FG: Jonathan Kim 32-yard field goal MSU 6–3; 14 plays, 61 yards, 6:09
- (03:48) UI TD: Erick All 13-yard pass from Deacon Hill (Drew Stevens kick) UI 10–6; 5 plays, 80 yards, 2:16
- (00:00) MSU FG: Jonathan Kim 58-yard field goal UI 10–9; 6 plays, 35 yards, 0:35

Third quarter

- (13:08) MSU TD: Cal Haladay 42-yard fumble recovery MSU 16–10
- (07:38) UI FG: Drew Stevens 53-yard field goal MSU 16–13; 4 plays, -5 yards, 2:02

Fourth quarter

- (05:19) UI FG: Drew Stevens 36-yard field goal Tied 16–16; 7 plays, 20 yards, 2:28
- (03:45) UI TD: Cooper DeJean 70-yard punt return (Drew Stevens kick) UI 23–16
- (00:59) UI FG: Drew Stevens 34-yard field goal UI 26–16; 6 plays, 14 yards, 2:30

Statistics	Michigan State	Iowa
First downs	20	14
Plays–yards	76–349	59–222
Rushes–yards	32–156	27–61
Passing yards	193	161
Passing: comp–att–int	25–44–3	14–32–1
Turnovers		
Time of possession	33:40	26:02

Team	Category	Player	Statistics
Michigan State	Passing	Noah Kim	25/44, 193 yards, 3 INT
Michigan State	Rushing	Nate Carter	20 carries, 108 yards
Michigan State	Receiving	Montorie Foster Jr.	8 receptions, 79 yards
Iowa	Passing	Deacon Hill	11/27, 115 yards, 1 TD, 1 INT
Iowa	Rushing	Leshon Williams	12 carries, 38 yards
Iowa	Receiving	Erick All	4 receptions, 67 yards, 1 TD

=== at Rutgers ===
Michigan State Spartans (2–3) at Rutgers Scarlet Knights (4–2) – Game summary

Quarter	1	2	3	4	Total
Spartans	7	10	7	0	24
Scarlet Knights	3	3	0	21	27

at SHI Stadium • Piscataway, New Jersey

- Date: October 14th
- Game time: 12:00 p.m. EST/9:00 a.m. PST
- Game weather: 52 °F (11 °C), Wind: 4 mph NE, Sunny
- Game attendance: 52,879
- Referee: Larry Smith
- TV announcers (BTN): Cory Provus (play-by-play), Matt Millen (analyst)

Game information

First quarter

- (07:32) MSU TD: Montorie Foster Jr. 13-yard pass from Katin Houser (Jonathan Kim kick) MSU 7–0; 14 plays, 75 yards, 7:28
- (02:52) RU FG: Jai Patel 22-yard field goal MSU 7–3; 10 plays, 61 yards, 4:40

Second quarter

- (13:21) RU FG: Jai Patel 47-yard field goal MSU 7–6; 7 plays, 46 yards, 3:15
- (01:46) MSU TD: Katin Houser 12-yard run (Jonathan Kim kick) MSU 14–6; 1 plays, 12 yards, 0:04
- (00:02) MSU FG: Jonathan Kim 37-yard field goal MSU 17–6; 10 plays, 44 yards, 1:31

Third quarter

- (03:41) MSU TD: Tre Mosley 4-yard pass from Katin Houser (Jonathan Kim kick) MSU 24–6; 14 plays, 80 yards, 6:28

Fourth quarter

- (13:09) RU TD: Aaron Young 0-yard bumble recovery (Jai Patel kick) MSU 24–13
- (08:30) RU TD: Isaiah Washington 4-yard pass from Gavin Wimsatt two-point conversion pass Christian Dremel from Gavin Wimsatt MSU 24–21; 12 plays, 73 yards, 3:45
- 08:41) RU TD: Kyle Monangai 21-yard run two-point conversion failed RU 27–24; 1 plays, 21 yards, 0:07

Statistics	Michigan State	Rutgers
First downs	22	20
Plays–yards	68–247	65–306
Rushes–yards	40–113	37–125
Passing yards	134	181
Passing: comp–att–int	18–29–0	13–28–2
Turnovers		
Time of possession	29:16	45:44

Team	Category	Player	Statistics
Michigan State	Passing	Katin Houser	18/29, 133 yards, 2 TD
Michigan State	Rushing	Nate Carter	20 carries, 52 yards
Michigan State	Receiving	Montorie Foster Jr.	5 receptions, 48 yards, 1 TD
Rutgers	Passing	Gavin Wimsatt	13/28, 181 yards, 1 TD, 2 INT
Rutgers	Rushing	Kyle Monangai	24 carries, 148 yards, 1 TD
Rutgers	Receiving	Christian Dremel	6 receptions, 80 yards

=== vs No. 2 Michigan ===
No. 2 Michigan Wolverines (7–0) at Michigan State Spartans (2–4) – Game summary

Quarter	1	2	3	4	Total
No. 2 Wolverines	14	14	14	7	49
Spartans	0	0	0	0	0

at Spartan Stadium • East Lansing, Michigan

- Date: October 21st
- Game time: 7:30 p.m. EST/4:30 p.m. PST
- Game weather: 46 °F (8 °C), Wind: 3 mph NW, Cloudy
- Game attendance: 74,206
- Referee: Ron Snodgrass
- TV announcers (NBC): Noah Eagle (play-by-play), Todd Blackledge (analyst), and Kathryn Tappen (sideline)

Game information

First quarter

- (08:50) UM TD: Blake Corum 1-yard run (James Turner kick) UM 7–0; 12 plays, 84 yards, 6:05
- (01:55) UM TD: Roman Wilson 25-yard pass from J. J. McCarthy (James Turner kick) UM 14–0; 5 plays, 51 yards, 2:52

Second quarter

- (10:44) UM TD: Colston Loveland 22-yard pass from J. J. McCarthy (James Turner kick) UM 21–0; 11 plays, 66 yards, 5:10
- (02:54) UM TD: Colston Loveland 22-yard pass from J. J. McCarthy (James Turner kick) UM 28–0; 7 plays, 48 yards, 3:59

Third quarter

- (09:49) UM TD: Mike Sainristil 72-yard interception (James Turner kick) UM 35–0
- (06:44) UM TD: Aj Barner 11-yard pass from J. J. McCarthy (James Turner kick) UM 42–0; 3 plays, 65 yards, 1:06

Fourth quarter

- (00:08) UM TD: Alex Orji 6-yard run (James Turner kick) UM 49–0; 5 plays, 33 yards, 3:02

Statistics	Michigan	Michigan State
First downs	28	10
Plays–yards	69–477	58–190
Rushes–yards	34-120	29-49
Passing yards	357	133
Passing: comp–att–int	28-35-0	16-29-2
Turnovers		
Time of possession	32:52	20:18

Team	Category	Player	Statistics
Michigan	Passing	J. J. McCarthy	21/27, 287 yards, 4 TD
Michigan	Rushing	Blake Corum	15 carries, 59 yards, 1 TD
Michigan	Receiving	A. J. Barner	8 receptions, 99 yards, 1 TD
Michigan State	Passing	Katin Houser	12/22, 101 yards, 1 INT
Michigan State	Rushing	Nate Carter	17 carries, 36 yards
Michigan State	Receiving	Maliq Carr	2 receptions, 32 yards

=== at Minnesota ===
Michigan State Spartans (2–5) at Minnesota Golden Gophers (4–3) – Game summary

Quarter	1	2	3	4	Total
Spartans	6	0	0	6	12
Golden Gophers	0	10	0	17	27

at Huntington Bank Stadium • Minneapolis, Minnesota

- Date: October 28th
- Game time: 3:30 p.m. EST/12:30 p.m. PST
- Game weather: 33 °F (1 °C), Wind: 8 mph W, Cloudy
- Game attendance: 47,392
- Referee: Chris Coyte
- TV announcers (BTN): Cory Provus (play-by-play), Jake Butt (analyst), and Brooke Fletcher (sideline)

Game information

First quarter

- (13:19) MSU FG: Jonathan Kim 38-yard field goal MSU 3–0; 4 plays, 5 yards, 1:22
- (09:49) MSU FG: Jonathan Kim 42-yard field goal MSU 6–0; 4 plays, 9 yards, 0:50

Second quarter

- (04:54) UMN FG: Dragan Kesich 22-yard field goal MSU 6–3; 8 plays, 94 yards, 2:55
- (00:19) UMN TD: Daniel Jackson 22-yard pass from Athan Kaliakmanis (Dragan Kesich kick) UMN 10–6; 8 plays, 94 yards, 2:55

Third quarter

- No scoring

Fourth quarter

- (12:07) UMN TD: Jordan Nubin 18-yard run (Dragan Kesich kick) UMN 17–6; 9 plays, 87 yards, 5:25
- (8:37) MSU TD: Tyell Henry 9-yard pass from Sam Leavitt two-point conversion failed UMN 17–12; 8 plays, 75 yards, 3:30
- (04:11) UMN TD: Jordan Nubin 2-yard run (Dragan Kesich kick) UMN 24–12; 7 plays, 46 yards, 4:25
- (03:25) UMN FG: Dragan Kesich 31-yard field goal UMN 27–12; 4 plays, 9 yards, 0:30

Statistics	Michigan State	Minnesota
First downs	15	23
Plays–yards	55–299	72–400
Rushes–yards	21–109	50–200
Passing yards	190	200
Passing: comp–att–int	20–34–1	14–22–1
Turnovers		
Time of possession	23:45	36:15

Team	Category	Player	Statistics
Michigan State	Passing	Katin Houser	12/22, 117 yards
Michigan State	Rushing	Sam Leavitt	6 carries, 52 yards
Michigan State	Receiving	Montorie Foster Jr.	4 receptions, 55 yards
Minnesota	Passing	Athan Kaliakmanis	14/22, 200 yards, 1 TD, 1 INT
Minnesota	Rushing	Jordan Nubin	40 carries, 204 yards, 2 TD
Minnesota	Receiving	Daniel Jackson	7 receptions, 120 yards, 1 TD

=== vs Nebraska ===
Nebraska Cornhuskers (5–3) at Michigan State Spartans (2–6) – Game summary

Quarter	1	2	3	4	Total
Cornhuskers	0	10	0	7	17
Spartans	3	7	3	7	20

at Spartan Stadium • East Lansing, Michigan

- Date: November 4th
- Game time: 12:00 p.m. EST/9:00 p.m. PST
- Game weather: 50 °F (10 °C), Wind: 2 mph W, Sunny
- Game attendance: 63,134
- Referee: Jerry McGinn
- TV announcers (FS1): Tim Brando (play-by-play), Spencer Tillman (analyst)

Game information

First quarter

- (11:51) MSU FG: Jonathan Kim 35-yard field goal MSU 3–0; 8 plays, 71 yards, 3:04

Second quarter

- (12:40) NEB TD: Heinrich Haarberg 5-yard run (Tristan Alvano kick) NEB 7–3; 10 plays, 59 yards, 4:31
- (09:14) MSU TD: Christian Fitzpatrick 11-yard pass from Katin Houser (Jonathan Kim kick) MSU 10–7; 6 plays, 75 yards, 3:26
- (00:06) NEB FG: Tristan Alvano 24-yard field goal Tied 10–10; 12 plays, 74 yards, 4:56

Third quarter

- (05:11) MSU FG: Jonathan Kim 50-yard field goal MSU 13–10; 12 plays, 53 yards, 6:24

Fourth quarter

- (12:13) MSU TD: Montorie Foster Jr. 25-yard pass from Sam Leavitt (Jonathan Kim kick) MSU 20–10; 4 plays, 38 yards, 1:15
- (03:35) NEB TD: Emmett Johnson 4-yard run (Tristan Alvano kick) MSU 20–17; 4 plays, 65 yards, 0:56

Statistics	Nebraska	Michigan State
First downs	18	11
Plays–yards	69–283	55–295
Rushes–yards	41–154	31–63
Passing yards	129	232
Passing: comp–att–int	12–28–2	15–23–0
Turnovers		
Time of possession	31:31	28:29

Team	Category	Player	Statistics
Nebraska	Passing	Heinrich Haarberg	12/28, 129 yards, 2 INT
Nebraska	Rushing	Emmett Johnson	13 carries, 57 yards, 1 TD
Nebraska	Receiving	Thomas Fidone II	3 receptions, 43 yards
Michigan State	Passing	Katin Houser	13/20, 165 yards, 1 TD
Michigan State	Rushing	Nate Carter	15 carries, 50 yards
Michigan State	Receiving	Montorie Foster Jr.	4 receptions, 94 yards, 1 TD

=== at No. 1 Ohio State ===
Michigan State Spartans (3–6) at No. 1 Ohio State Buckeyes (9–0) – Game summary

Quarter	1	2	3	4	Total
Spartans	0	3	0	0	3
No. 1 Buckeyes	14	21	3	0	38

at Ohio Stadium • Columbus, Ohio

- Date: November 11th
- Game time: 7:30 p.m. EST/4:30 p.m. PST
- Game weather: 45 °F (7 °C), Wind: 7 mph N, Cloudy
- Game attendance: 105,137
- Referee: Mark Kluczynski
- TV announcers (NBC): Noah Eagle (play-by-play), Todd Blackledge (analyst), and Kathryn Tappen (sideline)

Game information

First quarter

- (11:20) OSU TD: Marvin Harrison Jr. 19-yard run (Jayden Fielding kick) OSU 7–0; 8 plays, 75 yards, 3:40
- (6:56) OSU TD: Marvin Harrison Jr. 26-yard pass from Kyle McCord (Jayden Fielding kick) OSU 14–0; 4 plays, 61 yards, 1:30

Second quarter

- (14:58) OSU TD: Marvin Harrison Jr. 9-yard pass from Kyle McCord (Jayden Fielding kick) OSU 21–0; 13 plays, 84 yards, 5:37
- (5:38) MSU FG: Jonathan Kim 53-yard field goal OSU 21–3; 6 plays, 19 yards, 2:32
- (3:30) OSU TD: TreVeyon Henderson 9-yard run (Jayden Fielding kick) OSU 28–3; 6 plays, 70 yards, 2:08
- (0:15) OSU TD: Cade Stover 18-yard pass from Kyle McCord (Jayden Fielding kick) OSU 35-3; 8 plays, 74 yards, 1:26

Third quarter

- (11:56) OSU FG: Jayden Fielding 36-yard field goal OSU 38–3; 5 plays, 59 yards, 1:34

Statistics	Michigan State	Ohio State
First downs	11	25
Plays–yards	54–182	66–530
Rushes–yards	29–94	32–177
Passing yards	88	353
Passing: comp–att–int	13–25–0	26–34–0
Turnovers		
Time of possession	28:48	31:12

Team	Category	Player	Statistics
Michigan State	Passing	Katin Houser	12/24, 92 yards
Michigan State	Rushing	Nate Carter	11 carries, 52 yards
Michigan State	Receiving	Christian Fitzpatrick	2 receptions, 23 yards
Ohio State	Passing	Kyle McCord	24/31, 335 yards, 3 TD
Ohio State	Rushing	TreVeyon Henderson	13 carries, 63 yards, 1 TD
Ohio State	Receiving	Marvin Harrison Jr.	7 receptions, 149 yards, 2 TD

=== at Indiana ===
Michigan State Spartans (3–7) at Indiana Hoosiers (3–7) – Game summary

Quarter	1	2	3	4	Total
Spartans	7	7	0	10	24
Hoosiers	0	7	7	7	21

at Memorial Stadium • Bloomington, Indiana

- Date: November 18th
- Game time: 12:00 p.m. EST/9:00 a.m. PST
- Game weather: 45 °F (7 °C), Wind: 2 mph NE, Sunny
- Game attendance: 40,666
- Referee: Jeffrey Servinski
- TV announcers (BTN): Jason Ross Jr. (play-by-play), Anthony Herron (analyst), Meghan McKeown (sideline)

Game information

First quarter

- (11:09) MSU TD: Maliq Carr 17-yard pass from Katin Houser (Jonathan Kim kick) MSU 7–0; 9 plays, 62 yards, 3:44

Second quarter

- (09:29) IND TD: Trent Howland 4-yard run (Chris Freeman kick) Tied 7–7; 11 plays, 88 yards, 4:16
- (01:10) MSU TD: Montorie Foster Jr. 29-yard pass from Katin Houser (Jonathan Kim kick) MSU 14–7; 8 plays, 78 yards, 1:13

Third quarter

- (10:54) IND TD: James Bomba 3-yard pass from Brendan Sorsby (Chris Freeman kick) Tied 14–14; 8 plays, 75 yards, 4:06

Fourth quarter

- (09:26) MSU FG: Jonathan Kim 36-yard field goal MSU 17–14; 7 plays, 32 yards, 3:09
- (04:06) IND TD: Trey Walker 8-yard pass from Brendan Sorsby (Chris Freeman kick) IND 21–17; 11 plays, 75 yards, 5:20
- (01:19) MSU TD: Maliq Carr 36-yard pass from Katin Houser (Jonathan Kim kick) MSU 24–21; 8 plays, 75 yards, 2:47

Statistics	Michigan State	Indiana
First downs	21	23
Plays–yards	72–351	79–412
Rushes–yards	31–60	45–220
Passing yards	291	192
Passing: comp–att–int	26–41–2	19–34–0
Turnovers		
Time of possession	30:20	29:18

Team	Category	Player	Statistics
Michigan State	Passing	Katin Houser	26/41, 245 yards, 3 TD, 2 INT
Michigan State	Rushing	Nate Carter	11 carries, 42 yards
Michigan State	Receiving	Maliq Carr	9 receptions, 100 yards, 2 TD
Indiana	Passing	Brendan Sorsby	19/34, 192 yards, 2 TD
Indiana	Rushing	Trent Howland	19 carries, 77 yards, 1 TD
Indiana	Receiving	Donaven Mcculley	3 receptions, 72 yards

=== vs No. 11 Penn State ===
No. 11 Penn State Nittany Lions (9–2) at Michigan State Spartans (4–7) – Game summary

Quarter	1	2	3	4	Total
No. 11 Nittany Lions	3	10	15	14	42
Spartans	0	0	0	0	0

at Ford Field • Detroit, Michigan

- Date: November 24th
- Game time: 7:30 p.m. EST/4:30 p.m. PST
- Game weather: n/a (game played indoors)
- Game attendance: 51,927
- Referee: Chris Coyte
- TV announcers (NBC): Noah Eagle (play-by-play), Todd Blackledge (analyst), Kathryn Tappen (sideline)

Game information

First quarter

- (09:50) PSU FG: Alex Felkins 49-yard field goal PSU 3–0; 10 plays, 43 yards, 5:10

Second quarter

- (12:11) PSU FG: Alex Felkins 30-yard field goal PSU 6–0; 8 plays, 71 yards, 4:24
- (04:51) PSU TD: Kaytron Allen 2-yard pass from Drew Allar (Alex Felkins kick) PSU 13–0; 10 plays, 64 yards, 5:25

Third quarter

- (10:13) PSU TD: Tyler Warren 8-yard pass from Beau Pribula two-point conversion pass KeAndre Lambert-Smith from Drew Allar PSU 21–0; 7 plays, 51 yards, 3:06
- (04:13) PSU TD: Beau Pribula 2-yard run (Alex Felkins kick) PSU 28–0; 6 plays, 74 yards, 3:01

Fourth quarter

- (12:29) PSU TD: Theo Johnson 8-yard pass from Drew Allar (Alex Felkins kick) PSU 35–0; 3 plays, 28 yards, 1:43
- (07:58) PSU TD: Nicholas Singleton 14-yard run (Sander Sahaydak kick) PSU 42–0; 4 plays, 58 yards, 2:11

Statistics	Penn State	Michigan State
First downs	23	5
Plays–yards	67–586	48–53
Rushes–yards	39–283	27– -35
Passing yards	303	88
Passing: comp–att–int	19–28–0	12–21–1
Turnovers		
Time of possession	36:01	23:59

Team	Category	Player	Statistics
Penn State	Passing	Drew Allar	17/26, 292 yards, 2 TD
Penn State	Rushing	Kaytron Allen	15 carries, 137 yards
Penn State	Receiving	Nicholas Singleton	2 receptions, 68 yards
Michigan State	Passing	Katin Houser	11/19, 87 yards, 1 INT
Michigan State	Rushing	Nate Carter	8 carries, 39 yards
Michigan State	Receiving	Montorie Foster Jr.	2 receptions, 35 yards

== Rankings ==
Ranking movements Legend: ██ Increase in ranking ██ Decrease in ranking — = Not ranked RV = Received votes
	Week															
Poll	Pre	1	2	3	4	5	6	7	8	9	10	11	12	13	14	Final
AP	—	—	—	—	—	—	—	—	—	—	—					
Coaches	—	RV	RV	—	—	—	—	—	—	—	—					
CFP	Not released									—	—					Not released

== Personnel ==
=== Roster ===
2023 Michigan State Spartans football team roster
Players
Coaches
Offense

Pos.	#	Name	Class
WR	0	Alante Brown	Sr
RB	1	Jaren Mangham	Sr
WR	2	Tyrell Henry	So
RB	3	Jaelon Barbarin	Fr
QB	4	Sam Leavitt	Fr
RB	5	Nate Carter	So
TE	6	Maliq Carr	Jr
WR	7	Antonio Gates	Fr
RB	8	Jalen Berger	Jr
WR	9	Jaelen Smith	Fr
QB	10	Noah Kim	Jr
WR	11	Aziah Johnson	Fr
QB	12	Katin Houser	Fr
WR	13	Sebastian Brown	Jr
WR	15	Jaron Glover	Fr
WR	16	Christian Fitzpatrick	Jr
WR	17	Tre Mosley	Sr
QB	18	Andrew Schorfhaar	Jr
TE	19	Jaylan Franklin
WR	20	Aubrey Dawkins	Jr
RB	22	Jordon Simmons	Sr
TE	23	Tyneil Hopper
RB	24	Davion Primm	So
RB	25	Joseph Martinez	Jr
WR	31	Jack Yanachik	Fr
TE	47	Jackson Morse	Sr
OL	53	Brandon Baldwin	Jr
OL	54	Keyshawn Blackstock	Jr
OL	55	Cooper Terpstra	Fr
OL	56	Cole Dellinger	Fr
OL	57	Evan Brunning	Sr
OL	58	Spencer Brown	Sr
C	59	Nick Samac	Sr
OL	64	Braden Miller	Fr
OL	65	Stanton Ramil	Fr
OL	66	Ashton Lepo	Fr
OL	67	J.D. Duplain	Sr
OL	68	Gavin Broscious	Fr
OL	69	Jacob Merritt	Fr
OL	70	Kevin Wigenton II	So
OL	71	Kristian Phillips	Fr
OL	72	Dallas Fincher	Jr
OL	74	Geno VanDeMark	So
OL	75	Ben Nelson	Fr
OT	76	Andy Hartman	Fr
OL	77	Ethan Boyd	So
WR	80	Zach Gillespie	Jr
TE	81	Michael Masunas	Fr
TE	82	Brennan Parachek	Fr
WR	83	Montorie Foster Jr.	Sr
WR	85	Grant Calcagno	Fr
WR	86	Nick Hunter	Sr
TE	87	Jack Nickel	Fr
TE	88	Ademola Faleye	Jr
TE	92	Evan Morris	Sr

Defense

Pos.	#	Name	Class
DB	0	Charles Brantley	Jr
DB	1	Jaden Mangham	So
DL	2	Khris Bogle	Sr
DB	3	Caleb Coley	Fr
LB	4	Jacoby Windmon	Sr
LB	5	Jordan Hall	Fr
DB	6	Semar Melvin	Sr
LB	7	Aaron Brule
DL	8	Simeon Barrow	Jr
DL	9	Zion Young (S)	So
LB	10	Ma'a Gaotetote	Jr
LB	11	Quavian Carter	Fr
DB	12	Chester Kimbrough	Sr
DL	13	Jarrett Jackson
DB	14	Sean Brown	Fr
DB	15	Angelo Grose (S)	Sr
DB	16	Harold Joiner III
DB	17	Eddie Pleasant III	Fr
DB	18	Shawn Smith	Fr
DB	19	Armorion Smith	So
DB	20	Ade Willie	So
DB	21	Dillon Tatum	So
DL	22	Bai Jobe	Fr
LB	23	Darius Snow (injured)	Jr
DB	24	Malcolm Jones (S)	Fr
DB	25	Chance Rucker	Fr
DL	26	Brandon Wright	Sr
LB	27	Cal Haladay	Jr
DB	28	Philipp Davis	Fr
DB	29	Marquis Lowery	Jr
DB	30	Justin White (S)	Sr
DL	32	James Schott	Fr
LB	33	Aaron Alexander	Fr
DB	34	Khalil Majeed	So
LB	35	Sam Edwards	Jr
DB	36	Brandon Lewis	Fr
DB	37	Khary Crump (S)	Jr
DB	38	Terry Roberts
DB	39	Caleb Gash	Fr
DL	41	Derrick Harmon	So
LB	42	David Millikin	Fr
DB	43	Malik Spencer	So
DL	44	Ken Talley	Fr
DL	45	Dre Butler	Sr
DL	47	Jaxson Wilson	Fr
DL	50	Andrew Depaepe	Fr
DL	52	Tunmise Adeleye	So
DL	55	Jalen Thompson	Fr
LB	56	Jay Coyne	Fr
DL	91	Alex VanSumeren	Fr
LB	92	James Burbar	Jr
DL	97	Maverick Hansen	Sr
DL	98	Avery Dunn	Jr
DL	99	Jalen Sami

Special teams

Pos.	#	Name	Class
LS	31	Hank Pepper	Jr
K	39	Yousef Obeid	Fr
K	40	Tarik Ahmetbasic	Fr
LS	41	Drew Wilson	Jr
P	42	Michael O'Shaughnessy	Sr
P	96	Ryan Eckley	Fr
K	97	Jonathan Kim	Sr
K	98	Stephen Rusnak	So

Head coach

Harlon Barnett (interim)

Coordinators/assistant coaches

- Mark Dantonio (associate head coach)
- Chris Kapilovic (assistant head coach/offensive line/run game coordinator)
- Scottie Hazelton (defensive coordinator/linebackers)
- Jay Johnson (offensive coordinator/quarterbacks)
- Harlon Barnett (Secondary)
- Ross Els (special teams coordinator)
- Ted Gilmore (tight ends)
- Courtney Hawkins (wide receivers)
- Effrem Reed (running backs)
- Diron Reynolds (defensive line)
- Jim Salgado (cornerbacks)

Legend

- (C) Team captain
- (S) Suspended
- (I) Ineligible
- Injured
- Redshirt

Roster
Last update: August 7, 2023

=== Coaching staff ===
Name	Position	Season
Mel Tucker	Head coach – removed after 2 games	4th
Chris Kapilovic	Assistant head coach/offensive line/run game coordinator	4th
Jay Johnson	Offensive coordinator/quarterbacks	4th
Scottie Hazelton	Defensive coordinator	4th
Ted Gilmore	Tight ends	4th
Courtney Hawkins	Wide receivers	4th
Harlon Barnett	Secondary/interim head coach week 2 through end of season	15th
Ross Els	Special Teams/linebackers	4th
Effrem Reed	Running backs	2nd
Diron Reynolds	Defensive line	1st
Jim Salgado	Cornerbacks	1st

=== Coaching changes ===
On January 4, defensive line coach Marco Coleman left MSU to join his alma mater, Georgia Tech, as their defensive line coach. On January 25, the school named Stanford defensive line coach Diron Reynolds the team's new defensive line coach. On March 4, pass rush specialist coach Brandon Jordan left to take a job with the Seattle Seahawks. On March 16, the school named former Buffalo Bills safeties coach Jim Salgado as the new cornerbacks coach.

=== Transfers ===
==== Outgoing ====
On April 30, the final day to declare for the transfer portal, two-year starting quarterback Payton Thorne announced he was entering the portal. Wide receiver Keon Coleman also announced he would transfer.

Name	Pos.	New School
Payton Thorne	QB	Auburn
Keon Coleman	WR	Florida State
Jack Stone	K	Baylor
Michael Fletcher	DE	Appalachian State
Jalen Hunt	DT	Houston
Dashaun Mallory	DT	Arizona State
Chase Carter	DE	Incarnate Word
Kobe Myers	LB	
Elijah Collins	RB	Oklahoma State
Carson Casteel	LB	Vanderbilt
Jeff Pietrowski	DE	Wisconsin
Tate Hallock	DB	Western Michigan
Germie Bernard	WR	Washington
Terry Lockett	WR	Eastern Michigan
Cade McDonald	WR	Miami (OH)
Hamp Fay	TE/QB	Oklahoma
AJ Kirk	DB	Jones College (MS)
Itayvion 'Tank' Brown	DE	

==== Incoming ====
Name	Pos.	Former School
Ademola Faleye	TE	Norfolk State
Jaylan Franklin	TE	Wisconsin
Semar Melvin	CB	Wisconsin
Jonathan Kim	K	North Carolina
Nate Carter	RB	UConn
Jarrett Jackson	DL	Florida State
Aaron Alexander	LB	UMass
Jaren Mangham	RB	South Florida
Dre Butler	DE	Liberty
Tunmise Adeleye	DL	Texas A&M
Tyneil Hopper	TE	Boise State
Mason Arnold	LS	Ohio State
Michael O'Shaughnessy	P	Ohio State
Armorion Smith	S	Cincinnati
Jalen Sami	DT	Colorado
Alante Brown	WR	Nebraska
Terry Roberts	CB	Iowa

=== 2023 NFL draft ===
Following the conclusion of the season, several players declared for the NFL draft. Three players were selected in the draft.

Round	Pick	Team	Player	Position
2	50	Green Bay Packers	Jayden Reed	WR
6	192	New England Patriots	Bryce Baringer	P
6	214	New England Patriots	Ameer Speed	CB

Several other undrafted players signed free agent contracts with NFL teams:

- Jarrett Horst, offensive lineman, Miami Dolphins
- Jacob Slade, defensive lineman, Arizona Cardinals
- Kendell Brooks, safety, Arizona Cardinals
- Xavier Henderson, safety, Washington Commanders
- Ben VanSumeren, linebacker, Philadelphia Eagles
