= Noah Kim =

American football player (born 2001)

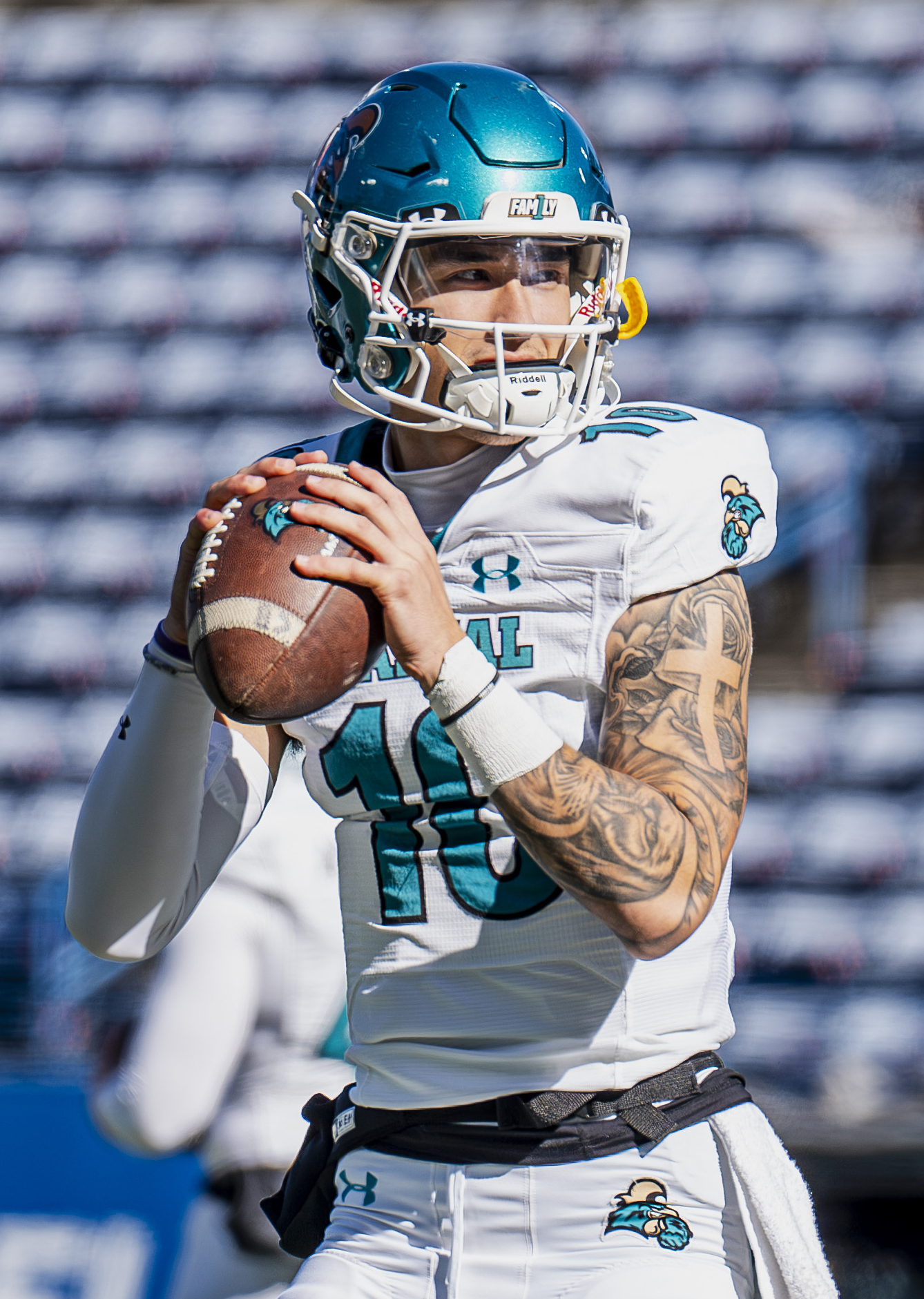

No. 1 – Eastern Michigan Eagles
- Position: Quarterback
- Class: Graduate Student

Personal information
- Born: December 3, 2001 (age 24)
- Listed height: 6 ft 2 in (1.88 m)
- Listed weight: 186 lb (84 kg)

Career information
- High school: Westfield (Centreville, Virginia)
- College: Michigan State (2020–2023); Coastal Carolina (2024); Eastern Michigan (2025–present)
- Stats at ESPN

Noah Kim (born December 3, 2001) is an American college football quarterback for the Eastern Michigan Eagles. He previously played for the Michigan State Spartans and the Coastal Carolina Chanticleers.

== Early life ==
Kim attended Westfield High School in Centreville, Virginia. He became the starting quarterback on the football team as a sophomore, leading them to a 15-0 record and the 2017 state championship. As a junior in 2018, he broke his femur in the state semifinals. Kim led his team to a 41–2 record in his three years as a starter, passing for 6,756 yards and 87 touchdowns and rushing for 1,056 yards and 23 touchdowns. Kim committed to play college football for the Virginia Tech Hokies. However Kim flipped his commitment to Michigan State University.

== College career ==
=== Michigan State ===
Kim enrolled at Michigan State University on June 21, 2020, and subsequently redshirted the 2020 season without appearing in a game. In 2021, Kim served as the backup quarterback to Payton Thorne and Anthony Russo and did not appear in a game. In 2022, as a redshirt sophomore, Kim was the primary backup to Thorne, ahead of Katin Houser. He made his collegiate debut in the 2022 season opener against Western Michigan, but did not record any statistics in the victory. The following week against Akron, Kim threw his first career touchdown in a victory. On the season, he appeared in four games and completed 14 of 19 passes for 174 yards and three touchdowns.

Following Thorne's transfer to Auburn, Kim competed with Houser and Sam Leavitt for the starting quarterback job. Kim won the starting quarterback competition ahead of the Spartans' season-opening matchup against Central Michigan. He completed 18 of 31 passes for 279 yards and two touchdowns in a 31–7 victory. The following week against Richmond, Kim completed 18 of 22 passes for 292 yards and three touchdowns in a 45–14 victory. However, Kim and the Spartans subsequently lost three consecutive games to No. 8 Washington, Maryland, and Iowa. Kim threw one touchdown and six interceptions in those losses. Following the loss to Iowa, it was announced that Houser would start the team's next game against Rutgers following the bye week. Kim was later demoted to third string behind Leavitt. He did not appear in another game for the remainder of the season. Kim started five games on the season, completing 91 of 160 passes for 1,090 yards, six touchdowns, and six interceptions, as Michigan State finished 4–8. On November 28, 2023, following the conclusion of the season, Kim entered the NCAA transfer portal.

=== Coastal Carolina ===
On December 12, 2023, Kim transferred to Coastal Carolina. Kim began the 2024 season as the primary backup to Ethan Vasko. In the season opener against Jacksonville State, he threw a touchdown on his only pass attempt in a 55–27 victory. In Week 7 against Louisiana, Kim replaced Vasko and played the most of any game that season, completing 16 of 25 passes for 182 yards and two touchdowns in a 34–24 loss. On the season, he appeared in seven games and completed 30 of 56 passes for 333 yards, four touchdowns, and one interception. On December 2, 2024, following the conclusion of the regular season, Kim entered the transfer portal for the second time, opting out of the 2024 Myrtle Beach Bowl.

=== Eastern Michigan ===
On January 5, 2025, Kim transferred to Eastern Michigan. He was voted team captain and named the starting quarterback. He made his Eagles debut in the 2025 season opener against Texas State, completing 23 of 34 passes for 248 yards and a touchdown in the loss. Following a disappointing upset loss to LIU, an FCS opponent, in which he threw for 189 yards and two touchdowns, Kim threw for a career-high 330 yards on 25 of 42 passing with a touchdown and an interception while adding a rushing touchdown in a 48–23 loss to Kentucky. It was the first of four consecutive games in which he scored a rushing touchdown. The following week, the Eagles rebounded with their first win of the season in their final non-conference game against Louisiana. Kim completed 21 of 31 passes for 226 yards, a touchdown, and an interception, while also scoring a rushing touchdown. He engineered a game-winning drive that was capped by a 42-yard game-winning field goal. Eastern Michigan finished the season with a 4–8 record. Despite the losing record, Kim and the Eagles ranked third nationally and first in the Mid-American Conference in red zone efficiency, converting 94.6 percent of their opportunities. Kim started all 12 games, leading the MAC in completions (247), attempts (402), passing yards (2,817), and passing yards per game (234.8), while throwing 18 touchdowns and 11 interceptions and rushing for 186 yards and six touchdowns.

In January 2026, Kim was granted an eligibility waiver by the NCAA, allowing him to return to Eastern Michigan for the 2026 season. Kim said, "It is a tremendous blessing to return for another year and compete alongside my brothers and the coaching staff as we continue elevating Eastern Michigan football." Kim returned for his seventh season of college football, along side Nick Kinsey and Neil Herman his second at Eastern Michigan, as the starting quarterback and a team captain.

=== Statistics ===
Year	Team	Games			Passing								Rushing			
Year	Team	GP	GS	Record	Cmp	Att	Pct	Yds	Y/A	TD	Int	Rtg	Att	Yds	Avg	TD
2020	Michigan State	0	0	—	Redshirted (redshirt)											
2021	Michigan State	0	0	—	DNP											
2022	Michigan State	5	0	—	14	19	73.7	174	9.2	3	0	202.7	1	5	5.0	0
2023	Michigan State	5	5	2–3	91	160	56.9	1,090	6.8	6	6	119.0	27	53	2.0	0
2024	Coastal Carolina	7	0	—	30	56	53.6	333	5.9	4	1	123.5	13	0	0.0	0
2025	Eastern Michigan	12	12	4–8	247	402	61.4	2,817	7.0	18	11	129.6	79	186	2.4	6
2026	Eastern Michigan	8	8	4–4	169	285	59.3	1,678	5.9	11	4	118.7	29	−23	−0.8	3
Career		37	25	10−15	551	922	59.8	6,092	6.6	42	22	125.5	149	221	1.5	9

== Personal life ==
Kim is of Korean descent on his father's side.
