= Sam Leavitt (American football) =

American football player (born 2004)

No. 10 – LSU Tigers
- Position: Quarterback
- Class: (redshirt) Junior

Personal information
- Born: December 20, 2004 (age 21)
- Listed height: 6 ft 2 in (1.88 m)
- Listed weight: 207 lb (94 kg)

Career information
- High school: West Linn (West Linn, Oregon)
- College: Michigan State (2023); Arizona State (2024–2025); LSU (2026–present)

Awards and highlights
- Big 12 Offensive Freshman of the Year (2024); Second-team All-Big 12 (2024)
- Stats at ESPN

Sam Leavitt (born December 20, 2004) is an American college football quarterback for the LSU Tigers. He previously played for the Michigan State Spartans and Arizona State Sun Devils.

== Early life ==
Leavitt attended Westview High School in Washington County, Oregon, as a freshman and junior, Pleasant Grove High School in Pleasant Grove, Utah, as a sophomore and West Linn High School in West Linn, Oregon, his senior year. He was the Gatorade Football Player of the Year for Oregon his senior year in 2022 after passing for 3,184 yards and 36 touchdowns. Leavitt committed to Michigan State University to play college football.

== College career ==
=== Michigan State ===
On June 24, 2023, Leavitt enrolled at Michigan State. As a true freshman, Leavitt competed with Noah Kim and Katin Houser for the starting quarterback job before entering the season as the third-string quarterback behind Kim and Houser. Leavitt made his collegiate debut in Week 4 against Maryland, completing both of his pass attempts for nine yards in a loss. After Michigan State opened the season 2–3, Kim was benched in favor of Houser, and Leavitt became the primary backup. In Week 8 against Minnesota, Leavitt threw his first collegiate touchdown in a loss. He appeared in four games during the season, completing 15 of 23 passes for 139 yards and two touchdowns with two interceptions, allowing him to preserve his redshirt. Following the season, Leavitt entered the NCAA transfer portal on December 4, 2023.

=== Arizona State ===
On December 11, 2023, Leavitt announced he was transferring to Arizona State University. Leavitt won the starting quarterback competition over Jeff Sims and Trenton Bourguet. In the 2024 season opener against Wyoming, Leavitt led the Sun Devils to a 48–7 victory, completing 14 of 22 passes for 258 yards and two touchdowns. The following week against Mississippi State, he rushed for 68 yards and two touchdowns in a 30–23 victory. Following a win over No. 16 Utah, Arizona State improved to 5–1. However, Leavitt sustained an injury during the victory that sidelined him for the following game against Cincinnati, which the Sun Devils lost. He returned the following week against Oklahoma State, throwing for 304 yards and three touchdowns in a 42–21 victory. The win began a five-game winning streak during which Leavitt threw 13 touchdowns with one interception, including victories over No. 16 Kansas State and No. 14 BYU. Arizona State finished the regular season 10–2 and earned a berth in the Big 12 Championship Game against No. 16 Iowa State. Leavitt completed 12 of 17 passes for 219 yards and three touchdowns while adding a rushing touchdown in the victory. The win earned Arizona State a berth in the College Football Playoff against Texas. Leavitt completed 24 of 46 passes for 222 yards and an interception while rushing for 60 yards in the double-overtime loss. On the season, he appeared in and started 13 games, completing 216 of 350 passes for 2,885 yards, 24 touchdowns, and six interceptions. He also rushed for 443 yards on 110 attempts and five touchdowns, ranking second on the team in rushing yards and rushing touchdowns behind Cameron Skattebo. For his performance, he was named Big 12 Offensive Freshman of the Year and a second-team All-Big 12 selection.

Leavitt returned as the starting quarterback to begin the 2025 season, with the Sun Devils ranked No. 11 entering the season. In the season-opening win against Northern Arizona, Leavitt accounted for four touchdowns. Leavitt and the Sun Devils were upset by Mississippi State the following week and dropped out of the rankings. Arizona State rebounded with three consecutive wins, with the final win coming against No. 24 TCU. Leavitt continued to deal with a lingering foot injury he had initially sustained against Baylor two weeks prior, forcing him to miss the following game against No. 21 Utah, a game the Sun Devils lost. After Arizona State dropped out of the rankings for the second time that season, Leavitt returned the following week against No. 7 Texas Tech, throwing for a season-high 317 yards and a touchdown in a 26–22 victory that moved the Sun Devils back into the rankings at No. 24. Leavitt suffered a season-ending injury when he re-aggravated his foot the following week in a loss to Houston. On October 31, it was announced that he would undergo season-ending surgery to repair it. On the season, he appeared in and started seven games, completing 145 of 239 passes for 1,628 yards, 10 touchdowns, and three interceptions while rushing for 306 yards and five touchdowns. On January 2, 2026, Leavitt entered the transfer portal for the second time.

=== LSU ===
On January 12, 2026, Leavitt transferred to Louisiana State University (LSU) to play for the Tigers.

=== Statistics ===
Legend
	Led FBS
**Bold**	Career High

Year	Team	Games			Passing								Rushing			
Year	Team	GP	GS	Record	Cmp	Att	Pct	Yds	Y/A	TD	Int	Rtg	Att	Yds	Avg	TD
2023	Michigan State	4	0	—	15	23	65.2	139	6.0	2	2	127.3	13	67	**5.2**	0
2024	Arizona State	**13**	**13**	**11–2**	216	**350**	61.7	**2,885**	**8.2**	**24**	6	150.2	**110**	**443**	4.0	5
2025	Arizona State	7	7	5–2	145	239	60.7	1,628	6.8	10	3	129.2	73	306	4.2	5
2026	LSU	10	10	6–4	**242**	340	**71.2**	2,797	**8.2**	19	**12**	**151.5**	98	337	3.4	**8**
Career		34	30	22–8	618	952	64.9	7,449	7.8	55	23	144.9	294	1,153	3.9	18

== Personal life ==
His brother, Dallin Leavitt, played in the NFL.
