= Katin Houser =

American football player (born 2004)

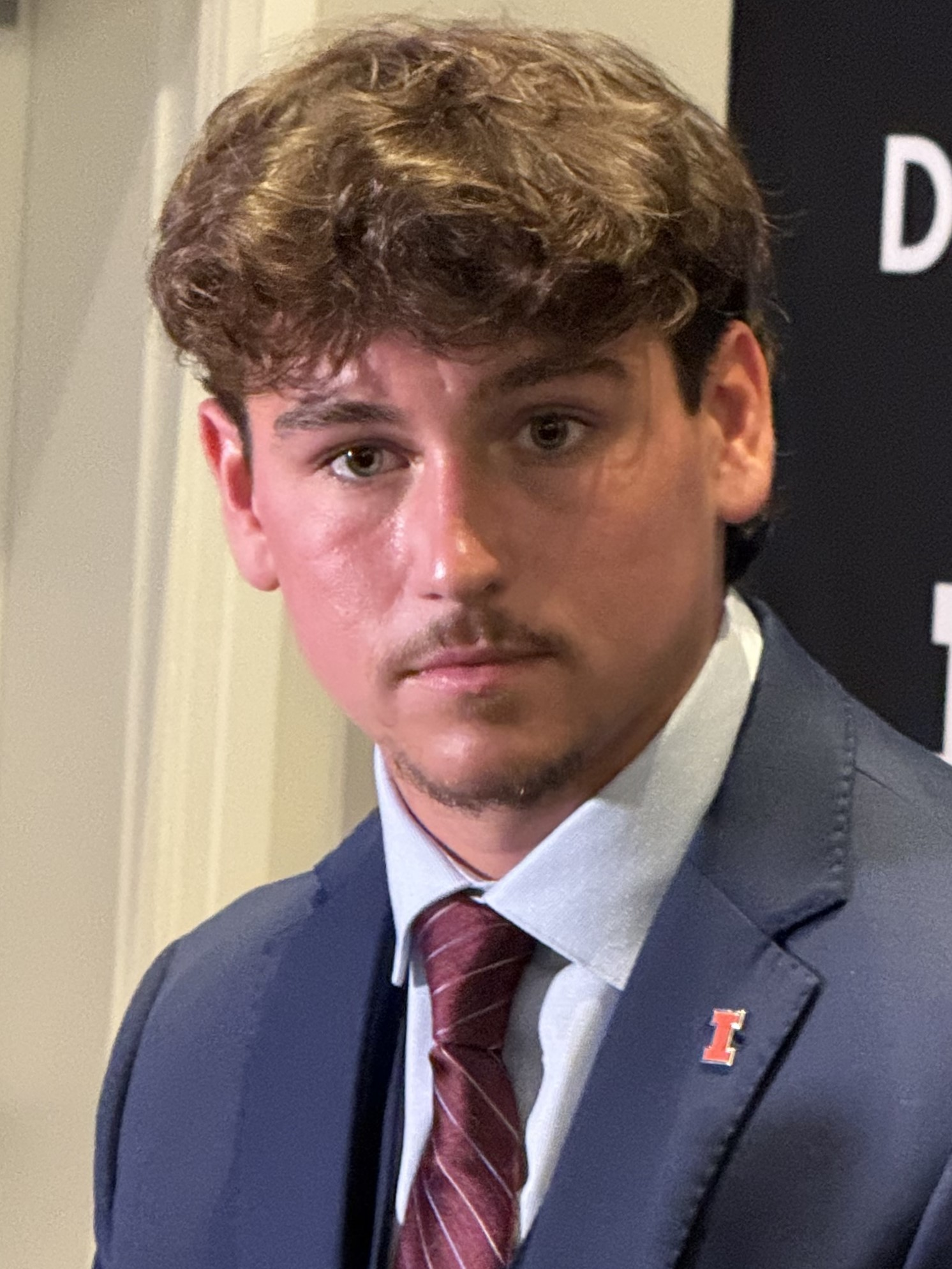
- Houser at 2026 Big Ten Media Day

No. 4 – Illinois Fighting Illini
- Position: Quarterback
- Class: (redshirt) Senior

Personal information
- Born: February 23, 2004 (age 22); Anaheim, California, U.S.
- Listed height: 6 ft 3 in (1.91 m)
- Listed weight: 225 lb (102 kg)

Career information
- High school: St. John Bosco (Bellflower, California)
- College: Michigan State (2022–2023); East Carolina (2024–2025); Illinois (2026–present)
- Stats at ESPN

Katin Houser (born February 23, 2004) is an American college football quarterback for the Illinois Fighting Illini. He previously played for the Michigan State Spartans and East Carolina Pirates.

== Early life ==
Houser originally attended Liberty High School in Henderson, Nevada before transferring to St. John Bosco High School in Bellflower, California for his final two years. As a senior, he split time at quarterback and passed for 1,408 yards with 12 touchdowns and two interceptions. Houser originally committed to Boise State University to play college football but later switched to Michigan State University.

== College career ==
=== Michigan State ===
Houser spent the 2022 season at Michigan State as a third-string quarterback behind Payton Thorne and Noah Kim. He made his collegiate debut in the season opener against Akron, completing his only appearance of the season in a victory and preserving his redshirt.

In 2023, Houser competed with Kim for the starting quarterback position and entered the season as the primary backup, ahead of fellow quarterback Sam Leavitt. After Michigan State opened the season 2–3, Houser was named the starter in Week 6 against Rutgers. In his first start, he threw his first two collegiate touchdown passes, completing 18 of 29 attempts for 133 yards, and added a rushing touchdown in a 27–24 loss. In Week 11 against Indiana, Houser completed 25 of 39 passes for 277 yards, three touchdowns, and two interceptions, including a game-winning 36-yard touchdown pass to Maliq Carr in the final two minutes of a 24–21 victory. For his performance, he was named Big Ten Freshman of the Week. Houser appeared in 11 games on the season and started the final seven as Michigan State finished 4–8. He completed 112 of 191 passes for 1,130 yards, six touchdowns, and five interceptions, while adding two rushing touchdowns. On November 27, 2023, following the conclusion of the season, Houser announced that he would enter the transfer portal.

=== East Carolina ===
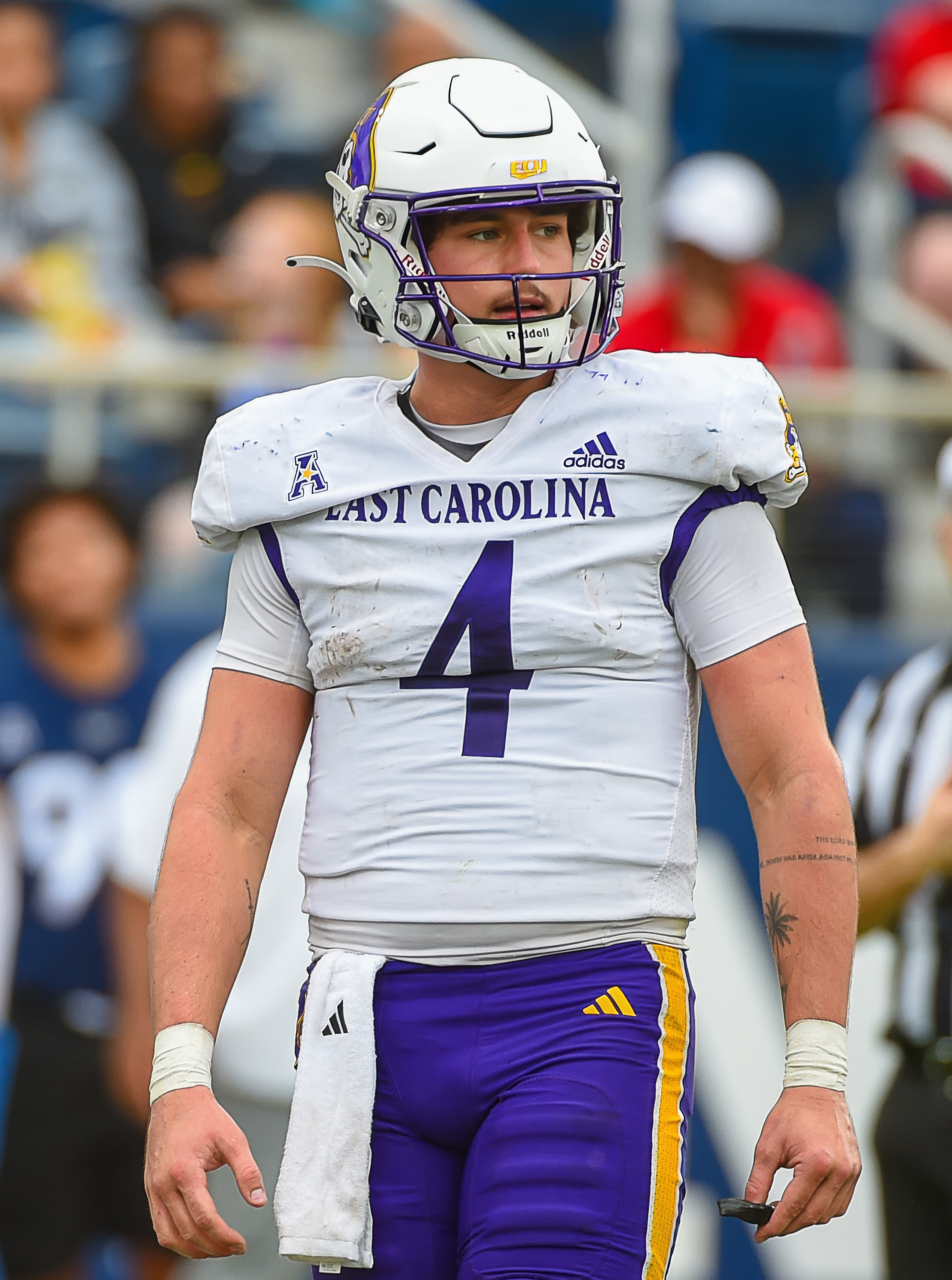
Houser with ECU in 2025

On December 16, 2023, Houser announced that he would transfer to East Carolina. He lost the starting quarterback competition to fellow transfer Jake Garcia. Houser made his Pirates debut in the season-opening victory over Norfolk State. His next appearance came in Week 6, when he relieved Garcia in a loss to Charlotte. Following a 3–3 start, Houser was named the starting quarterback for the following week's game against No. 23 Army. He completed 24 of 38 passes for 282 yards, three touchdowns, and one interception, while adding a rushing touchdown in a 45–28 loss. The following week against Temple, Houser threw for 269 yards and five touchdowns with two interceptions in a 56–34 victory. He followed that performance by completing 17 of 22 passes for 343 yards and five touchdowns, while adding 52 rushing yards and a touchdown, in a 49–14 victory over Florida Atlantic. For his performance against Florida Atlantic, Houser was named the American Athletic Conference Offensive Player of the Week. In the 2024 Military Bowl, Houser led the Pirates to a 26–21 victory over NC State, completing 18 of 29 passes for 147 yards and two interceptions while adding 84 rushing yards and two touchdowns. On the season, he appeared in nine games and made seven starts, completing 149 of 245 passes for 2,006 yards, 18 touchdowns, and 11 interceptions, while adding 170 rushing yards and four touchdowns.

Entering the 2025 season, Houser returned as East Carolina's starting quarterback, marking the first time in his collegiate career that he entered a season as a full-time starter. Garcia transferred to Michigan, while Chaston Ditta and Mike Wright joined East Carolina and competed with Houser for the starting job. Houser won the competition and started all 12 regular season games, leading East Carolina to an 8–4 record. He recorded multiple touchdown passes in eight games and at least 300 passing yards in four. He completed 269 of 408 passes for 3,300 yards, 19 touchdowns, and six interceptions, while adding 193 rushing yards and nine rushing touchdowns. On December 15, 2025, Houser announced that he would enter the transfer portal for the second time and opted out of the 2025 Military Bowl against Pittsburgh. He finished his East Carolina career ranked among the program's top 10 statistical leaders in multiple categories.

=== Illinois ===
On January 4, 2026, Houser announced he was transferring to the Illinois Fighting Illini. In July, head coach Bret Bielema named Houser the starting quarterback for the 2026 season. In his debut against UAB, Houser completed 13 of 17 passes for 182 yards and three touchdowns, while rushing for 29 yards and a touchdown in a 42–23 victory. He finished the game with a 224.6 passer efficiency rating, the highest ever by an Illinois quarterback in his debut and the eighth-highest single-game mark in program history. On the final play before halftime, Houser completed a Hail Mary to Ty Robinson for a 54-yard score. In Week 6 against his former team, Michigan State, Houser fractured his right throwing hand after being intercepted late in the third quarter, with Illinois leading 23–10. Before leaving the game due to injury, he completed 20 of 29 passes for 194 yards and a touchdown, threw an interception, and recorded a rushing touchdown. Illinois went on to win 38–37 in overtime. Houser initially was expected to miss most of the season but underwent hand surgery during the team's ensuing bye week. He missed Illinois' game against Oregon before returning to start the following week against Maryland. In the fourth quarter, Houser led a game-winning drive that resulted in a 26-yard field goal, securing a 20–17 victory.

=== Statistics ===
Year	Team	Games			Passing								Rushing			
Year	Team	GP	GS	Record	Cmp	Att	Pct	Yds	Y/A	TD	Int	Rtg	Att	Yds	Avg	TD
2022	Michigan State	1	0	—	1	2	50.0	2	1.0	0	0	58.4	1	13	13.0	0
2023	Michigan State	11	7	2–5	112	191	58.6	1,130	5.9	6	5	113.5	48	−12	−0.3	2
2024	East Carolina	9	7	5–2	149	245	60.8	2,006	8.2	18	11	144.9	49	170	3.5	4
2025	East Carolina	12	12	8–4	269	408	65.9	3,300	8.1	19	6	146.3	85	181	2.1	9
2026	Illinois	9	9	5−4	178	286	62.2	2,131	7.5	18	8	140.0	4437	128	2.9	2
Career		42	35	20–15	709	1,132	62.6	8,569	7.6	61	30	140.0	227	492	2.2	17
