= Kay'Ron Lynch-Adams =

American football player (born 2000)

Profile
- Position: Running back

Personal information
- Born: December 30, 2000 (age 25); Warren, Ohio, U.S.
- Listed height: 5 ft 10 in (1.78 m)
- Listed weight: 215 lb (98 kg)

Career information
- High school: Warren G. Harding (Warren, Ohio)
- College: Rutgers (2019–2020); UMass (2021–2023); Michigan State (2024)
- NFL draft: 2025: undrafted

Career history
- Carolina Panthers (2025)*
- * Offseason or practice squad member only

Kay'Ron Lynch-Adams (born December 30, 2000) is an American professional football running back. He played college football for the Rutgers Scarlet Knights, UMass Minutemen, and Michigan State Spartans.

== Early life ==
Lynch-Adams attended Warren G. Harding High School in Warren, Ohio. He was rated as a three-star recruit and committed to play college football for the Rutgers Scarlet Knights.

== College career ==
=== Rutgers ===
In two years with the Scarlet Knights in 2019 and 2020, Lynch-Adams totaled 320 yards and two touchdowns on 83 carries and brought in six receptions for 120 yards and a touchdown. After the 2020 season, he entered his name into the NCAA transfer portal.

=== UMass ===
Lynch-Adams transferred to play for the UMass Minutemen. In his first two seasons with UMass in 2021 and 2022, he rushed 123 times for 411 yards and two touchdowns in 18 games. In 2023, Lynch-Adams rushed 236 attempts for 1,157 yards and 12 touchdowns. After the season, he entered his name into the NCAA transfer portal once again.

=== Michigan State ===
Lynch-Adams transferred to play for the Michigan State Spartans. In his team debut he rushed for 101 yards and a touchdown on nine carries in a season-opening win over FAU.

== Professional career ==
Pre-draft measurables
Height	Weight	Arm length	Hand span	40-yard dash	10-yard split	20-yard split	20-yard shuttle	Three-cone drill	Vertical jump	Broad jump	Bench press
5 ft 9 1/4 in (1.76 m)	205 lb (93 kg)	30 in (0.76 m)	8 1/4 in (0.21 m)	4.60 s	1.61 s	2.69 s	4.55 s	7.43 s	32 in (0.81 m)	9 ft 5 in (2.87 m)	17 reps
All values from Pro Day

On May 8, 2025, Lynch-Adams signed with the Carolina Panthers as an undrafted free agent after going unselected in the 2025 NFL draft. He was waived on August 25.
