= Bai Jobe =

Senegalese gridiron football player (born 2004)

No. 22 – Miami RedHawks
- Position: Defensive end
- Class: Redshirt Sophomore

Personal information
- Born: December 22, 2004 (age 21); Senegal
- Listed height: 6 ft 4 in (1.93 m)
- Listed weight: 249 lb (113 kg)

Career information
- High school: Community Christian School (Norman, Oklahoma, U.S.)
- College: Michigan State (2023); Kansas (2024); Miami (OH) (2025–present)
- Stats at ESPN

Bai Jobe (born December 22, 2004) is a Senegalese American football defensive end for the Miami RedHawks. He previously played for the Michigan State Spartans and the Kansas Jayhawks.

== Early life ==
Jobe was born and raised in Senegal before he moved to the US in eighth grade. He attended the Community Christian School in Norman, Oklahoma, where he played football and basketball. Jobe was rated as a four-star recruit and the 55th overall prospect in the class of 2023. Jobe committed to play college football for the Michigan State Spartans over offers from schools such as Alabama, Georgia, Michigan, Oklahoma, Oklahoma State, Texas, Texas A&M, and Miami.

== College career ==
As a freshman in 2023, Jobe appeared in one game against Washington, where he notched two tackles. After the season, he entered his name into the NCAA transfer portal.

Jobe transferred to play for the Kansas Jayhawks. On April 20, 2025, he announced that he would enter the transfer portal for the second time.

On May 6, 2025, Jobe announced that he would transfer to Miami (OH).
