= Tanner Miller =

American football player

Profile
- Position: Offensive guard

Personal information
- Listed height: 6 ft 2 in (1.88 m)
- Listed weight: 296 lb (134 kg)

Career information
- High school: Valencia (Santa Clarita, California)
- College: Oregon State (2019–2023); Michigan State (2024)
- NFL draft: 2025: undrafted

Awards and highlights
- Second-team All-Pac-12 (2023)

Tanner Miller is an American football offensive guard. He played college football for the Oregon State Beavers and the Michigan State Spartans.

== Early life ==
Miller attended Valencia High School in Santa Clarita, California. Coming out of high school, he decided to walk-on to play for the Oregon State Beavers.

== College career ==
=== Oregon State ===
In Miller's first two seasons in 2019 and 2020, he redshirted and played in two combined games. In the 2021 season, he was awarded a scholarship by the Beavers. Miller played in all 12 games for the Beavers in 2021. In 2022, he appeared in 13 games where he made his first career start against Arizona State. During the 2023 season, Miller was named a second-team mid-season all-American. In 2023, Miller started all 13 games for the Beavers. For his performance on the season, Miller was named first-team all Pac-12 by the AP News and second team all-American by ESPN.

=== Michigan State ===
Miller transferred to play for the Michigan State Spartans.

== Professional career ==
Pre-draft measurables
Height	Weight	Arm length	Hand span	40-yard dash	10-yard split	20-yard split	20-yard shuttle	Three-cone drill	Vertical jump	Broad jump	Bench press
6 ft 1 in (1.85 m)	283 lb (128 kg)	30 7/8 in (0.78 m)	8 7/8 in (0.23 m)	5.13 s	1.75 s	3.01 s	4.74 s	7.82 s	26.5 in (0.67 m)	8 ft 8 in (2.64 m)	25 reps
All values from Pro Day

On April 28, 2025, Miller received a rookie minicamp invite by the Las Vegas Raiders.
