= Charles Brantley (American football) =

American football player

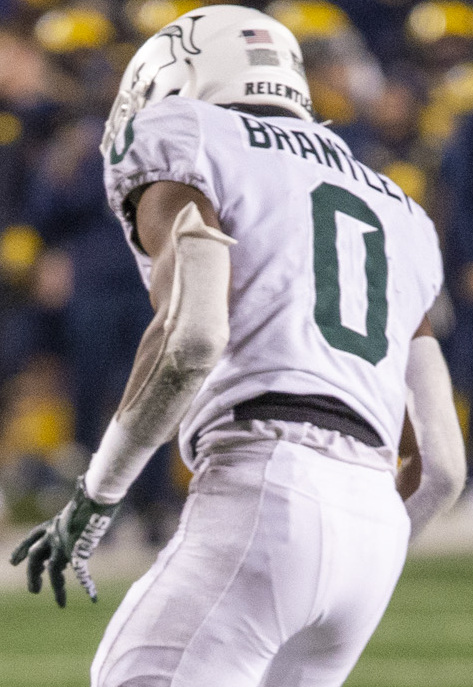
- Brantley with Michigan State in 2022

No. 4 – Michigan State Spartans
- Position: Cornerback
- Class: Redshirt Senior

Personal information
- Listed height: 6 ft 0 in (1.83 m)
- Listed weight: 170 lb (77 kg)

Career information
- High school: Venice (Venice, Florida)
- College: Michigan State (2021–2024, 2026–present); Miami (FL) (2025)
- Stats at ESPN

Charles Brantley is an American college football cornerback for the Michigan State Spartans. He previously played for the Miami Hurricanes.

== Early life ==
Brantley attended Venice High School in Venice, Florida. He was rated as a three-star recruit and committed to play college football for the Michigan State Spartans.

== College career ==
In week 8 of the 2021 season, Brantley had four tackles and the game-winning interception in a 37-33 win over rival Michigan. In his freshman season in 2021, he played in eight games notching 18 tackles, four pass deflections, and an interception. In week 6 of the 2022 season, Brantley picked off C. J. Stroud and returned it 32 yards for a touchdown versus Ohio State. In the 2022 season, he started 11 games for the Spartans, where he totaled 48 tackles, a sack, six pass deflections, an interception, and a touchdown. During the 2023 season, Brantley played in just three games before suffering a season-ending injury, where he had ten tackles, and a pass deflection. In week 3 of the 2024 season, he returned an interception 100 yards for a touchdown in a 40-0 win over Prairie View A&M.

On December 10, 2024, Brantley announced he was entering into the NCAA Transfer portal. On December 21, 2024, he announced on 'X' his intention to transfer to the University of Miami.

== Personal life ==
Brantley is the cousin of former Michigan State and NFL wide receiver, Herb Haygood.
