= Jalen Thompson (defensive end) =

American football player

No. 9 – Arizona State Sun Devils
- Position: Defensive end
- Class: Senior

Personal information
- Listed height: 6 ft 3 in (1.91 m)
- Listed weight: 265 lb (120 kg)

Career information
- High school: Cass Technical (Detroit, Michigan)
- College: Michigan State (2023–2025); Arizona State (2026–present)
- Stats at ESPN

Jalen Thompson is an American college football defensive end for the Arizona State Sun Devils. He previously played for the Michigan State Spartans.

== Early life ==
Thompson attended Cass Technical High School in Detroit, Michigan. Between his sophomore and senior seasons he racked up a combined 30 sacks. A four-star recruit, Thompson committed to Michigan State University to play college football.

== College career ==
Thompson played in eight games and started the final four his freshman year at Michigan State in 2023 and recorded 19 tackles with two sacks. As a sophomore in 2024, he started all 12 game and had 17 tackles. As a junior in 2025, he started 10 of 11 games and recorded 30 tackles with 2.5 sacks. After the season, Thompson entered the transfer portal and committed to Arizona State University. He entered the 2026 season with Arizona State as a starter.
