= Montorie Foster =

American football player (born 2001)

Montorie Foster Jr.
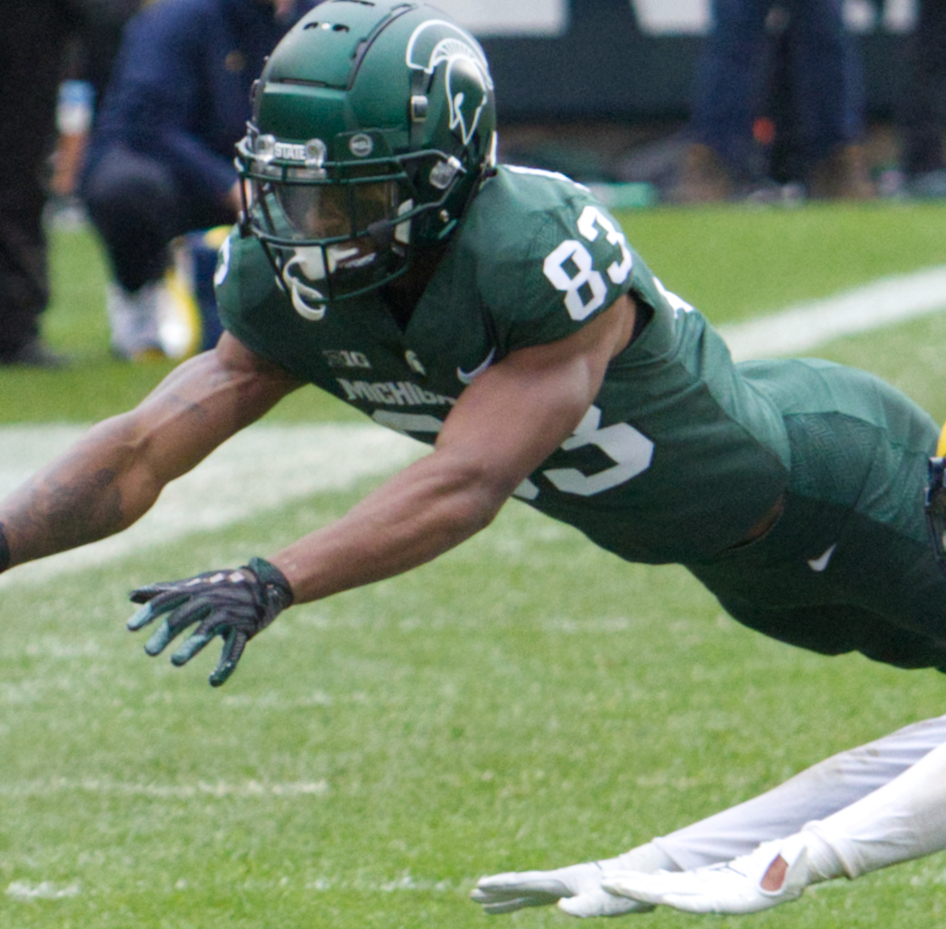
- Foster with Michigan State in 2021

No. 87 – Seattle Seahawks
- Position: Wide receiver
- Roster status: Practice squad

Personal information
- Born: August 3, 2001 (age 25); Cleveland, Ohio, U.S.
- Listed height: 6 ft 0 in (1.83 m)
- Listed weight: 188 lb (85 kg)

Career information
- High school: St. Edward (Lakewood, Ohio)
- College: Michigan State (2020–2024)
- NFL draft: 2025: undrafted

Career history
- Seattle Seahawks (2025–present)

Awards and highlights
- Super Bowl champion (LX)

Career NFL statistics as of Week 9, 2026
- Total tackles: 1
- Stats at Pro Football Reference

Montorie Foster Jr. (born August 3, 2001) is an American professional football wide receiver for the Seattle Seahawks of the National Football League (NFL). He played college football for the Michigan State Spartans.

== Early life ==
Foster attended St. Edward High School in Lakewood, Ohio, and had offers to play college basketball from Akron and Eastern Kentucky. He was also rated as a three-star football recruit despite not playing the sport until his senior year of high school and committed to play college football for the Michigan State Spartans.

== College career ==
As a freshman in 2020, Foster played in seven games where he made two tackles, while making no receptions. In week 10 of the 2021 season, he made his first career start bringing in three catches for 33 yards versus Purdue. During the 2021 season, Foster notched 12 receptions for 164 yards and a touchdown in three starts for the Spartans. In 2022, Foster notched seven receptions for 98 yards and a touchdown. In week 10 of the 2023 season, he tallied four receptions for 94 yards and a touchdown in a win over Nebraska. In week 12, Foster brought in seven receptions for 94 yards and a touchdown in a win over Indiana. During the 2023 season, he started in all 12 games for the Spartans, hauling in 43 receptions for 576 yards and three touchdowns.

== Professional career ==
Pre-draft measurables
Height	Weight	Arm length	Hand span	Wingspan	40-yard dash	10-yard split	20-yard split	20-yard shuttle	Three-cone drill	Vertical jump	Broad jump	Bench press
5 ft 11 5/8 in (1.82 m)	188 lb (85 kg)	29 1/4 in (0.74 m)	9 1/4 in (0.23 m)	5 ft 11 5/8 in (1.82 m)	4.63 s	1.57 s	2.68 s	4.47 s	7.01 s	35.0 in (0.89 m)	9 ft 8 in (2.95 m)	14 reps
All values from Pro Day

Foster signed with the Seattle Seahawks as an undrafted free agent on May 12, 2025. He was waived with an injury designation on August 7. Foster was re-signed to the team's practice squad on December 30. On February 12, 2026, he signed a reserve/futures contract with Seattle.

Foster made the Seahawks initial 53-man roster in 2026, playing in one game before being waived on October 24, 2026. He re-signed to the practice squad on October 27.
