= Jordan Hall (linebacker) =

American football player

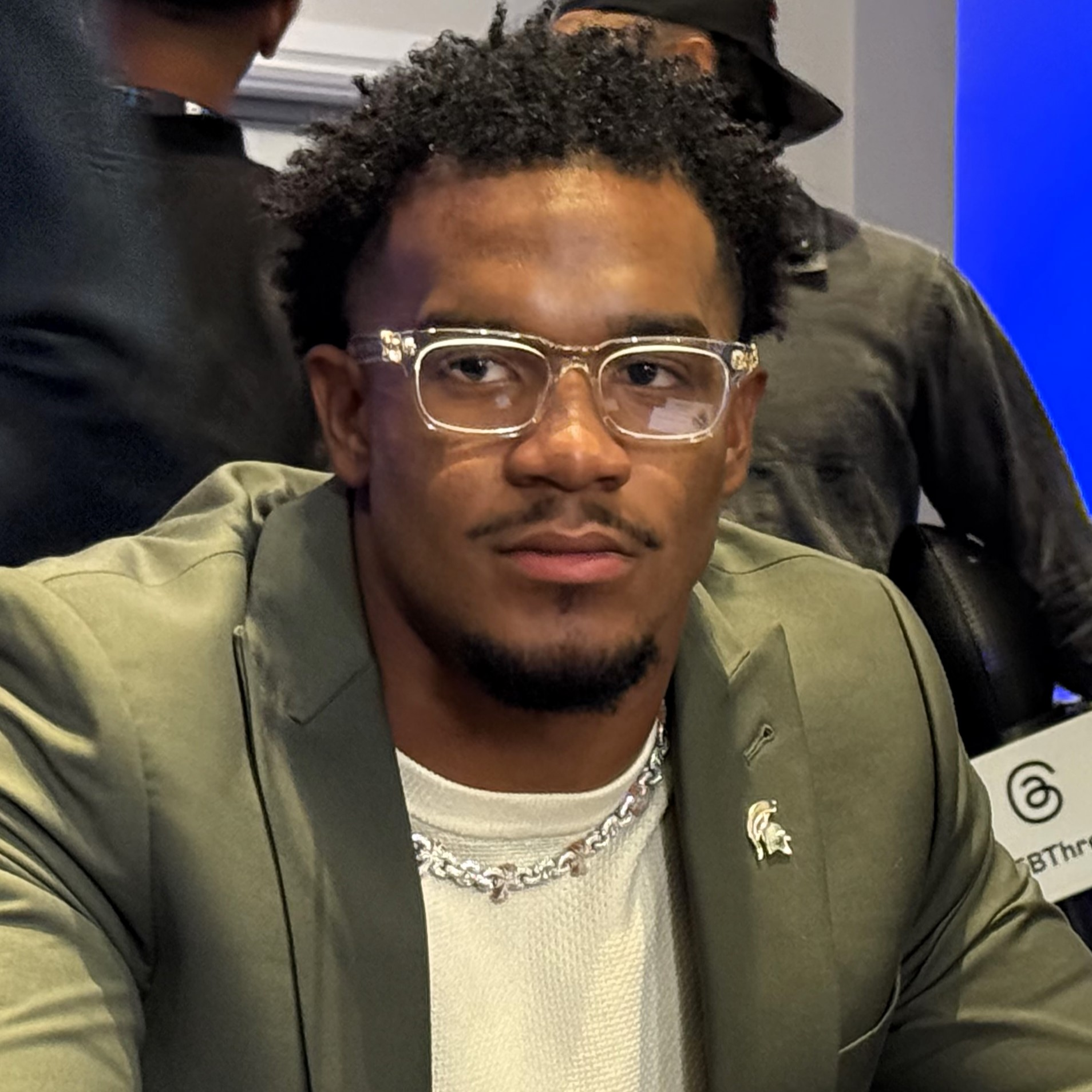
- Hall at 2026 Big Ten Media Days

No. 5 – Michigan State Spartans
- Position: Linebacker
- Class: Senior

Personal information
- Listed height: 6 ft 3 in (1.91 m)
- Listed weight: 235 lb (107 kg)

Career information
- High school: IMG Academy
- College: Michigan State (2023–present)
- Stats at ESPN

Jordan Hall is an American college football linebacker for the Michigan State Spartans.

== Early life ==
Hall grew up in Fredericksburg, Virginia and attended IMG Academy. He was rated as a four-star recruit, the 14th best linebacker, and the 194th overall player in the 2023 recruiting class. Hall committed to play college football for the Michigan State Spartans over offers from schools such as Florida, Michigan, Notre Dame, and North Carolina.

== College career ==
Hall made his first career start in week 4 of the 2023 season versus Maryland after starter Jacoby Windmon went down with a season ending injury. During the 2023 season, Hall played in twelve games where he made six starts, notching 67 tackles with seven and a half being for a loss, and four and a half sacks. After the conclusion of the 2023 season, Hall decided to enter his name into the NCAA transfer portal. However, Hall later removed his name from the portal and returned to play for the Spartans in 2024.
