= Nate Carter =

American football player (born 2002)

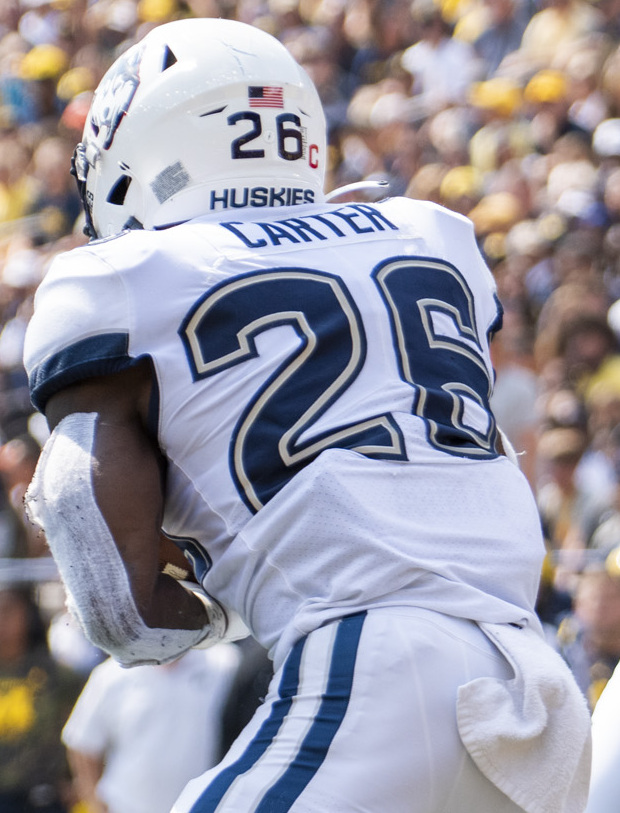
- Carter with UConn in 2022

No. 35 – Kansas City Chiefs
- Position: Running back
- Roster status: Practice squad

Personal information
- Born: May 22, 2002 (age 24); Rochester, New York, U.S.
- Listed height: 5 ft 9 in (1.75 m)
- Listed weight: 200 lb (91 kg)

Career information
- High school: Bishop Kearney (Irondequoit, New York)
- College: UConn (2020–2022); Michigan State (2023–2024)
- NFL draft: 2025: undrafted

Career history
- Atlanta Falcons (2025); Kansas City Chiefs (2026–present)

Career NFL statistics as of Week 10, 2026
- Rushing yards: 66
- Rushing average: 6.0
- Stats at Pro Football Reference

Nathan Carter (born May 22, 2002) is an American professional football running back for the Kansas City Chiefs of the National Football League (NFL). He played college football for the UConn Huskies and Michigan State Spartans, and went undrafted in the 2025 NFL draft.

== Early life ==
Carter attended Bishop Kearney High School in Irondequoit, New York. He committed to the University of Connecticut to play college football.

== College career ==
Carter played at UConn from 2020 to 2022. After redshirting his first year in 2020, he started four of 12 games, rushing for 578 yards on 125 carries with two touchdowns. He played in five games in 2022 as the starter, rushing for 405 yards on 65 carries with one touchdown.

Carter transferred to Michigan State University in 2023. In his first game with Michigan State, he rushed for 113 yards on 18 carries with a touchdown.

On December 6, 2024, Carter declared for the 2025 NFL draft.

== Professional career ==
Pre-draft measurables
Height	Weight	Arm length	Hand span	Wingspan	40-yard dash	10-yard split	20-yard split	20-yard shuttle	Three-cone drill	Vertical jump	Broad jump	Bench press
5 ft 9 1/4 in (1.76 m)	200 lb (91 kg)	31 1/4 in (0.79 m)	9 in (0.23 m)	6 ft 2 7/8 in (1.90 m)	4.40 s	1.58 s	2.59 s	4.20 s	7.15 s	40.0 in (1.02 m)	10 ft 8 in (3.25 m)	23 reps
All values from Pro Day

=== Atlanta Falcons ===
After going unselected in the 2025 NFL draft, Carter signed with the Atlanta Falcons as an undrafted free agent on April 28, 2025.

On August 30, 2026, Carter was waived by the Falcons as a part of final roster cuts.

=== Kansas City Chiefs ===
On September 1, 2026, Carter was signed to the Kansas City Chiefs' practice squad.

== NFL career statistics ==
Year	Team	Games		Rushing					Receiving					Fumbles	
Year	Team	GP	GS	Att	Yds	Avg	Lng	TD	Rec	Yds	Avg	Lng	TD	Fum	Lost
2025	ATL	7	0	9	60	6.7	12	0	—	—	—	—	—	1	1
2026	KC	1	0	2	6	3.0	5	0	—	—	—	—	—	—	—
Career		8	0	11	66	6.0	12	0	—	—	—	—	—	1	1

== Personal life ==
Carter is a Christian.
