= Khris Bogle =

American football player (born 2000)

Profile
- Position: Defensive end

Personal information
- Born: October 9, 2000 (age 26); Fort Lauderdale, Florida, U.S.
- Listed height: 6 ft 4 in (1.93 m)
- Listed weight: 245 lb (111 kg)

Career information
- High school: Cardinal Gibbons (Fort Lauderdale)
- College: Florida (2019–2021); Michigan State (2022–2024)
- NFL draft: 2025: undrafted

Career history
- Columbus Aviators (2026)*; Winnipeg Blue Bombers (2026)*
- * Offseason or practice squad member only

Khris Bogle (born October 9, 2000) is an American professional football defensive end.

== Early life ==
Bogle attended Cardinal Gibbons High School. As a senior, he played in just nine games due to injury but totaled 54 total tackles with 18.5 tackles going for a loss, eight sacks, two fumble recoveries, two passes defended, and a block kicked. Coming out of high school, Bogle initially committed to play college football for the Alabama Crimson Tide. However, he later flipped his commitment to play for the Florida Gators.

== College career ==
=== Florida ===
As a freshman in 2019, Bogle notched 18 tackles with two and a half being for a loss, two sacks, and a pass deflection. In 2020, he made 28 tackles with four being for a loss, three and a half sacks, and a forced fumble. In 2021, Bogle tallied 23 tackles with three and a half being for a loss, and a sack and a half. After the season, he entered his name into the NCAA transfer portal.

=== Michigan State ===
Bogle transferred to play for the Michigan State Spartans. In 2022, he notched 11 tackles with three being for a loss, and a sack. During the 2023 season, Bogle played in ten games with five starts totaling 14 tackles with two being for a loss, and a sack and a half. After the season, Bogle once again entered his name into the NCAA transfer portal. However just under a month later, Bogle withdrew from the transfer portal.

== Professional career ==
On April 28, 2025, Blackshear received a minicamp invite from the New York Giants.

=== Columbus Aviators ===
On January 14, 2026, Blackshear was selected by the Columbus Aviators of the United Football League (UFL). He was released on February 20.

=== Winnipeg Blue Bombers ===
On January 22, 2026, Bogle signed with the Winnipeg Blue Bombers of the Canadian Football League (CFL). He was released on May 10, 2026.
