= 2018 Michigan State Spartans football team =

American college football season

2018 Michigan State Spartans football

Redbox Bowl, L 6–7 vs. Oregon
- Conference: Big Ten Conference
- East Division
- Record: 7–6 (5–4 Big Ten)
- Head coach: Mark Dantonio (12th season)
- Co-offensive coordinators: Dave Warner (6th season); Jim Bollman (6th season)
- Offensive scheme: Pro-style
- Defensive coordinator: Mike Tressel (4th season)
- Base defense: Multiple
- Home stadium: Spartan Stadium

2018 Big Ten Conference football standings
	Conf.			Overall
Team	W		L	W		L
East Division
No. 3 Ohio State xy$	8	–	1	13	–	1
No. 14 Michigan x	8	–	1	10	–	3
No. 17 Penn State	6	–	3	9	–	4
Michigan State	5	–	4	7	–	6
Maryland	3	–	6	5	–	7
Indiana	2	–	7	5	–	7
Rutgers	0	–	9	1	–	11
West Division
No. 21 Northwestern xy	8	–	1	9	–	5
Wisconsin	5	–	4	8	–	5
No. 25 Iowa	5	–	4	9	–	4
Purdue	5	–	4	6	–	7
Minnesota	3	–	6	7	–	6
Nebraska	3	–	6	4	–	8
Illinois	2	–	7	4	–	8
Championship: Ohio State 45, Northwestern 24
$ – Conference champion; x – Division champion/co-champions; y – Championship game participant; Rankings from AP Poll

The 2018 Michigan State Spartans football team represented Michigan State University in the 2018 NCAA Division I FBS football season. The Spartans played their home games at Spartan Stadium in East Lansing, Michigan, and competed in the East Division of the Big Ten Conference. They were led by 12th-year head coach Mark Dantonio.

The Spartans returned 19 starters from their Holiday Bowl-winning 2017 team, and began the year at 11th in the AP Poll. In the second game of the year, the team was upset on the road by unranked Arizona State. The team fell out of the top 25 after falling to Northwestern on homecoming, but bounced back with a road win against then-No. 8 Penn State. The Spartan offense struggled mightily in the second half of the season, and the team failed to score more than 7 points in losses to Michigan, Ohio State, and Nebraska. They finished the regular season in fourth in the East Division with a conference record of 5–4. Michigan State was invited to the Redbox Bowl, where they lost to Oregon by a score of 7–6, which matched their final record.

The team was characterized by a stark dichotomy in performance between offense and defense; the defense finished in the top ten nationally in six categories, while the offense finished in the bottom 20 nationally in six categories. Junior quarterback Brian Lewerke led the team in passing, finishing the year with 2,040 passing yards, 8 touchdowns and 11 interceptions. He was replaced by redshirt freshman Rocky Lombardi in several games as Lewerke struggled with injuries and poor performance. Connor Heyward, replacing the injured LJ Scott, led the team in rushing. On defense, Kenny Willekes led the Big Ten in tackles for a loss (21), and was named the conference's Defensive Lineman of the Year. Linebacker Joe Bachie was also an impact player, being named first team all-conference by the coaches.

== Offseason ==
=== 2018 NFL draft ===
MSU kept its streak of 78 years of having at least one player drafted in the NFL Draft alive when Brian Allen was drafted in the fourth round.

Round	Pick	Team	Player	Position
4	111	Los Angeles Rams	Brian Allen	Offensive lineman

Additionally, one player, Chris Frey Jr., was signed by the Carolina Panthers as an undrafted free agent.

=== Recruiting ===
College recruiting (2019)
Name	Hometown	School	Height	Weight	Commit date
Xavier Henderson; DB	Pickerington, Ohio	Pickerington High School Central	6 ft 0 in (1.83 m)	189 lb (86 kg)	Sep 9, 2016
Xavier Henderson; DB	Recruit ratings: Scout: Rivals: 247Sports: ESPN:				
Trenton Gillison; TE	Pickerington, Ohio	Pickerington High School Central	6 ft 5 in (1.96 m)	220 lb (100 kg)	Jan 29, 2017
Trenton Gillison; TE	Recruit ratings: Scout: Rivals: 247Sports: ESPN:				
Theo Day; QB	Dearborn, Michigan	Divine Child High School	6 ft 5 in (1.96 m)	197 lb (89 kg)	Feb 26, 2017
Theo Day; QB	Recruit ratings: Scout: Rivals: 247Sports: ESPN:				
Christian Jackson; CB	Marietta, Georgia	Lassiter High School	6 ft 1 in (1.85 m)	185 lb (84 kg)	Mar 1, 2017
Christian Jackson; CB	Recruit ratings: Scout: Rivals: 247Sports: ESPN:				
Edward Warinner; LB	Powell, Ohio	Olentangy Liberty High School	6 ft 2 in (1.88 m)	222 lb (101 kg)	Apr 12, 2017
Edward Warinner; LB	Recruit ratings: Scout: Rivals: 247Sports: ESPN:				
Michael Dowell; DB	North Ridgeville, Ohio	St. Edward High School (Lakewood)	6 ft 0 in (1.83 m)	195 lb (88 kg)	May 29, 2017
Michael Dowell; DB	Recruit ratings: Scout: Rivals: 247Sports: ESPN:				
Jeslord Boateng; LB	Dublin, Ohio	Dublin Coffman High School	6 ft 2 in (1.88 m)	210 lb (95 kg)	Jun 12, 2017
Jeslord Boateng; LB	Recruit ratings: Scout: Rivals: 247Sports: ESPN:				
Davion Williams; CB	Belleville, Michigan	Belleville High School	6 ft 2 in (1.88 m)	185 lb (84 kg)	Jun 17, 2017
Davion Williams; CB	Recruit ratings: Scout: Rivals: 247Sports: ESPN:				
Dimitri Douglas; OT	Saline, Michigan	Saline High School	6 ft 4 in (1.93 m)	282 lb (128 kg)	Jun 19, 2017
Dimitri Douglas; OT	Recruit ratings: Scout: Rivals: 247Sports: ESPN:				
Jacob Slade; DE	Lewis Center, Ohio	Olentangy High School	6 ft 4 in (1.93 m)	255 lb (116 kg)	Jun 25, 2017
Jacob Slade; DE	Recruit ratings: Scout: Rivals: 247Sports: ESPN:				
Zachary Slade; DE	Lewis Center, Ohio	Olentangy High School	6 ft 4 in (1.93 m)	240 lb (110 kg)	Jun 25, 2017
Zachary Slade; DE	Recruit ratings: Scout: Rivals: 247Sports: ESPN:				
Javez Alexander; WR	Sandusky, Ohio	Sandusky High School	6 ft 2 in (1.88 m)	195 lb (88 kg)	Jun 28, 2017
Javez Alexander; WR	Recruit ratings: Scout: Rivals: 247Sports: ESPN:				
Parks Gissinger; DE	West Hills, California	Chaminade College Preparatory School	6 ft 4 in (1.93 m)	227 lb (103 kg)	Jul 20, 2017
Parks Gissinger; DE	Recruit ratings: Scout: Rivals: 247Sports: ESPN:				
Chase Kline; LB	Chardon, Ohio	Chardon High School	6 ft 3 in (1.91 m)	225 lb (102 kg)	Jul 25, 2017
Chase Kline; LB	Recruit ratings: Scout: Rivals: 247Sports: ESPN:				
Julian Major; WR	Pittsburgh, Pennsylvania	Penn Hills High School	6 ft 1 in (1.85 m)	185 lb (84 kg)	Jul 29, 2017
Julian Major; WR	Recruit ratings: Scout: Rivals: 247Sports: ESPN:				
James Ohonba; OT	Stockbridge, Georgia	Woodland High School	6 ft 4 in (1.93 m)	345 lb (156 kg)	Sep 29, 2017
James Ohonba; OT	Recruit ratings: Scout: Rivals: 247Sports: ESPN:				
Elijah Collins; RB	Detroit, Michigan	University of Detroit Jesuit High School	6 ft 0 in (1.83 m)	194 lb (88 kg)	Sep 29, 2017
Elijah Collins; RB	Recruit ratings: Scout: Rivals: 247Sports: ESPN:				
Jacob Isaia; OG	Las Vegas, Nevada	Bishop Gorman High School	6 ft 3 in (1.91 m)	280 lb (130 kg)	Oct 1, 2017
Jacob Isaia; OG	Recruit ratings: Scout: Rivals: 247Sports: ESPN:				
Kalon Gervin; CB	Detroit, Michigan	Cass Technical High School	5 ft 11 in (1.80 m)	180 lb (82 kg)	Dec 2, 2017
Kalon Gervin; CB	Recruit ratings: Scout: Rivals: 247Sports: ESPN:				
La'Darius Jefferson; QB	Muskegon, Michigan	Muskegon High School	6 ft 2 in (1.88 m)	209 lb (95 kg)	Dec 9, 2017
La'Darius Jefferson; QB	Recruit ratings: Scout: Rivals: 247Sports: ESPN:				
Jalen Nailor; WR	Las Vegas, Nevada	Bishop Gorman High School	5 ft 11 in (1.80 m)	170 lb (77 kg)	Feb 3, 2018
Jalen Nailor; WR	Recruit ratings: Scout: Rivals: 247Sports: ESPN:				
Overall recruit ranking:
Note: In many cases, Scout, Rivals, 247Sports, On3, and ESPN may conflict in their listings of height and weight.; In these cases, the average was taken. ESPN grades are on a 100-point scale.; Sources: "2018 Team Ranking". Rivals.com.

== Preseason ==
=== Award watch lists ===
Award	Player	Position	Year
Chuck Bednarik Award	Joe Bachie	LB	JR
Maxwell Award	Brian Lewerke	QB	JR
Maxwell Award	LJ Scott	RB	SR
Davey O'Brien Award	Brian Lewerke	QB	JR
Doak Walker Award	LJ Scott	RB	SR
Butkus Award	Joe Bachie	LB	JR
Jim Thorpe Award	David Dowell	S	JR
Bronko Nagurski Trophy	Joe Bachle	LB	JR
Outland Trophy	David Beedle	G	SR
Ray Guy Award	Jake Hartbarger	P	SR
Wuerffel Trophy	Khari Willis	DB	SR
Walter Camp Award	Brian Lewerke	QB	JR
Ted Hendricks Award	Kenny Willekes	DE	JR
Johnny Unitas Golden Arm Award	Brian Lewerke	QB	JR
Manning Award	Brian Lewerke	QB	JR

== Schedule ==
Date	Time	Opponent	Rank	Site	TV	Result	Attendance
August 31	7:00 p.m.	Utah State*	No. 11	Spartan Stadium; East Lansing, MI	BTN	W 38–31	73,114
September 8	10:45 p.m.	at Arizona State*	No. 15	Sun Devil Stadium; Tempe, AZ	ESPN	L 13–16	53,599
September 22	7:30 p.m.	at Indiana	No. 24	Memorial Stadium; Bloomington, IN (rivalry)	BTN	W 35–21	45,445
September 29	12:00 p.m.	Central Michigan*	No. 21	Spartan Stadium; East Lansing, MI	FS1	W 31–20	73,752
October 6	12:00 p.m.	Northwestern^{†}	No. 20	Spartan Stadium; East Lansing, MI	FS1	L 19–29	72,850
October 13	3:30 p.m.	at No. 8 Penn State		Beaver Stadium; University Park, PA (rivalry)	BTN	W 21–17	106,685
October 20	12:00 p.m.	No. 6 Michigan	No. 24	Spartan Stadium; East Lansing, MI (rivalry)	FOX	L 7–21	76,131
October 27	12:00 p.m.	Purdue		Spartan Stadium; East Lansing, MI	ESPN	W 23–13	72,657
November 3	12:00 p.m.	at Maryland		Maryland Stadium; College Park, MD	ESPN2	W 24–3	31,735
November 10	12:00 p.m.	No. 8 Ohio State	No. 24	Spartan Stadium; East Lansing, MI	FOX	L 6–26	74,633
November 17	12:00 p.m.	at Nebraska		Memorial Stadium; Lincoln, NE	FOX	L 6–9	88,793
November 24	4:00 p.m.	Rutgers		Spartan Stadium; East Lansing, MI	FOX	W 14–10	64,951
December 31	3:00 p.m.	vs. Oregon*		Levi's Stadium; Santa Clara, CA (Redbox Bowl)	FOX	L 6–7	30,212
*Non-conference game; ^{†}Homecoming; Rankings from AP Poll released prior to the game; All times are in Eastern time

== Personnel ==
=== Roster ===
2018 Michigan State Spartans football team roster
Players
Coaches
Offense

Pos.	#	Name	Class
RB	3	LJ Scott	Sr
WR	4	C. J. Hayes	Fr
QB	6	Theo Day	Fr
WR	7	Cody White	So
WR	9	Jalen Nailor	Fr
RB	11	Connor Heyward	So
WR	12	Nick Krumm	Jr
QB	12	Rocky Lombardi	Fr
QB	13	Mickey Macius	Sr
WR	13	Laress Nelson	So
WR	14	Emmanuel Flowers	Fr
QB	14	Brian Lewerke (C)	Jr
RB	15	La'Darius Jefferson	Fr
RB	16	Austin Andrews	So
WR	16	Brandon Sowards	Sr
WR	18	Felton Davis III	Sr
WR	19	Julian Major	Fr
WR	20	David Lewandowski	Jr
WR	21	Cam Chambers	So
RB	24	Elijah Collins	Fr
WR	25	Darrell Stewart Jr.	Jr
RB	27	Weston Bridges	Fr
RB	36	Noah Sargent	So
RB	39	Alante Thomas	So
FB	40	Collin Lucas	Sr
FB	41	Reid Burton	So
FB	44	Max Rosenthal	Fr
FB	45	Ben Line	Sr
OT	55	Jordan Reid	So
G	56	Matt Carrick	Fr
G	59	David Beedle	Sr
OT	61	Cole Chewins	Jr
OT	62	Luke Campbell	So
OT	63	Noah Listermann	Jr
OL	64	Matt Allen	So
OL	66	Blake Bueter	Fr
OL	67	Bryce Wilker	Jr
OT	68	Dan Vanopstall	Fr
OL	69	Tommy Liesveld	So
OL	70	Tyler Higby	Jr
OL	71	James Ohonba	Fr
OL	73	Jacob Isaia	Fr
OL	74	Jack Henrichs	Fr
G	75	Kevin Jarvis	So
OT	76	A. J. Arcuri	So
OL	77	Dimitri Douglas	Fr
OT	79	Mustafa Khaleefah	Fr
TE	80	Matt Seybert	Jr
TE	81	Matt Sokol	Sr
WR	82	Javez Alexander	Fr
TE	84	Noah Davis	So
WR	85	Khylin Barton	So
TE	86	Jonathan Brys (I)	So
WR	87	Jahz Watts	Fr
TE	88	Trenton Gillison	Fr
WR	88	Andre Welch	So
TE	89	Matt Dotson	So
TE	94	Chase Gianacakos	Sr

Defense

Pos.	#	Name	Class
CB	2	Justin Layne	Jr
S	3	Xavier Henderson	Fr
LB	5	Andrew Dowell	Sr
S	6	David Dowell	Jr
S	7	Michael Dowell	Fr
CB	8	Chris Jackson	Fr
S	9	Dominique Long	So
S	10	Matt Morrissey	Sr
CB	11	Davion Williams	Fr
LB	17	Tyriq Thompson	Jr
CB	18	Kalon Gervin	Fr
CB	19	Josh Butler	Jr
LB	21	Chase Kline	Fr
CB	22	Josiah Scott	So
S	24	Tre Person	So
LB	26	Brandon Bouyer-Randle	So
S	27	Khari Willis (C)	Sr
LB	28	Jon Reschke	Sr
DB	29	Shakur Brown	Fr
LB	30	Tanner Hallock	Fr
LB	31	Edward Warinner	Fr
DB	32	Corey Pryor	So
LB	33	Jesslord Boateng	Fr
LB	34	Antjuan Simmons	So
LB	35	Joe Bachie (C)	Jr
CB	36	Jiah Norman	Fr
LB	37	Dante Razzano	So
LB	38	Byron Bullough	Sr
DL	41	Gerald Owens	Sr
DE	42	Brent Mossburg	Fr
S	43	Jack Mandryk	Fr
LB	44	Grayson Miller	Sr
LB	47	Noah Harvey	Fr
DE	48	Kenny Willekes	Jr
S	49	David Kruse	Fr
DE	52	Dillon Alexander	Sr
LB	53	Peter Fisk	So
LB	54	Mitchell Sokol	Fr
DE	55	Zach Slade	Fr
LB	58	Terry O'Connor	Fr
DT	64	Jacob Slade	Fr
DT	72	Mike Panasiuk	Jr
DT	83	Mufi Hill-Hunt	So
DL	86	Drew Beesley	So
DE	91	Jack Camper	Fr
DE	92	DeAri Todd	Fr
DT	93	Naquan Jones	So
DT	94	Dashaun Mallory	Fr
DE	96	Jacub Panasiuk	So
DE	97	Justice Alexander	Jr
DE	98	Parks Gissinger	Fr
DT	99	Raequan Williams	Jr

Special teams

Pos.	#	Name	Class
K	4	Matt Coghlin	So
P	25	Jake Hartbarger	Sr
LS	47	Ryan Armour	Jr
LS	57	Collin Caflisch	Jr
P	92	William Przystup	Fr
K, P	94	Jack McKenna	Fr
K	97	Tyler Hunt	Fr
K	98	Cole Hahn	Fr

Head coach

- Mark Dantonio

Coordinators/assistant coaches

- Mark Staten (Assistant head coach / Offensive Line)
- Mike Tressel (Co-Defensive coordinator / Linebackers)
- Dave Warner (Co-Offensive Coordinator / Running Backs)
- Jim Bollman (Co-Offensive Coordinator / Tight Ends)
- Chuck Bullough (Defensive Ends)
- Ron Burton (Defensive Tackles)
- Brad Salem (Quarterbacks)
- Paul Haynes (Secondary / Special Teams)
- Terrence Samuel (Wide Receivers)
- Don Treadwell (Asst. Defensive Backs)

Legend

- (C) Team captain
- (S) Suspended
- (I) Ineligible
- Injured
- Redshirt

Roster
Last update: August 29, 2018

=== Coaching staff ===
On January 2, 2018, Harlon Barnett was hired as defensive coordinator for Florida State, leaving the Spartans after spending the previous 14 years with head coach Mark Dantonio. On January 19, the school announced that co-defensive coordinator Mike Tressel was promoted to defensive coordinator with the departure of Barnett.

Also on January 19, former Kent State head coach Paul Haynes was hired as the secondary coach. Haynes, who was fired from Kent State after five seasons as head coach, returned to the Spartans after serving as defensive backs coach from 2003 to 2004. On January 22, the school announced the hiring of former Kent State offensive coordinator Don Treadwell, who had coached with the Spartans on two prior occasions, as a defensive backs and special teams coach. On February 1, the school hired Chuck Bullough as defensive ends coach.

Name	Position	Joined staff
Mark Dantonio	Head coach	2007
Mark Staten	Assistant head coach/offensive line	2007
Dave Warner	Co-Offensive Coordinator/Running Backs	2007
Jim Bollman	Co-Offensive Coordinator/Tight Ends	2013
Mike Tressel	Defensive coordinator/linebackers	2007
Brad Salem	Quarterbacks	2010
Terrence Samuel	Wide receivers	2011
Ron Burton	Defensive Tackles	2013
Chuck Bullough	Defensive Ends	2018
Don Treadwell	Assistant Defensive Backs/Special Teams, Freshmen	2018
Paul Haynes	Secondary	2018

== Game summaries ==
=== Utah State ===
Week One: Utah State at Michigan State – Game summary

Quarter	1	2	3	4	Total
Utah State	7	7	10	7	31
No. 11 Michigan State	6	14	7	11	38

at Spartan Stadium, East Lansing, MI

- Date: August 31, 2018
- Game time: 7:01 pm EDT
- Game weather: 80°F, Wind: 11 mph SSE, Sunny
- Game attendance: 73,114
- Referee: Ron Snodgrass
- TV announcers (BTN): Brandon Gaudin (Play-by-play), Glen Mason (analyst), Elise Menaker (sideline)

Game information

First Quarter

- (12:58) USU TD: Love 1 yard rush, Eberle kick
  Utah State 7–0; 8 plays, 70 yards, 2:02
- (9:34) MSU FG: Coghlin 49 yard field goal
  Utah State 7–3; 5 plays, 43 yards, 3:21
- (2:58) MSU FG: Coghlin 32 yard field goal
  Utah State 7–6; 9 plays, 34 yards, 5:03

Second Quarter

- (10:49) MSU TD: White 7 yard pass from Lewerke, Coghlin kick
  Michigan State 13–7; 4 plays, 42 yards, 1:16
- (6:55) USU TD: Thompson 2 yard rush, Eberle kick good
  Utah State 14–13; 10 plays, 72 yards, 3:48
- (0:28) MSU TD: Davis 10 yard pass from Lewerke, Coghlin kick
  Michigan State 20–14; 13 plays, 75 yards, 6:27

Third Quarter

- (9:06) MSU TD: Heyward 17 yard rush, Coghlin kick
  Michigan State 27–14; 11 plays, 81 yards, 5:43
- (2:00) USU FG: Eberle 40 yard field goal
  Michigan State 27–17; 8 plays, 28 yards, 3:17
- (1:50) USU TD: Ferguson 40 yard interception return, Eberle kick
  Michigan State 27–24

Fourth Quarter

- (10:27) MSU FG: Coghlin 24 yard field goal
  Michigan State 30–24; 14 plays, 38 yards, 1:27
- (5:05) USU TD: Thompson 1 yard rush, Eberle kick
  Utah State 31–30; 17 plays, 63 yards, 5:18
- (2:00) MSU TD: Heyward 13 yard rush, 2-point pass good
  Michigan State 38–31; 10 plays, 75 yards, 3:05

Passing

- USU – Jordan Love: 29/44, 319 yards, 2 INT
- MSU – Brian Lewerke: 23/33, 287 yards, 2 TD, 1 INT

Rushing

- USU – Darwin Thompson: 10 carries, 28 yards, 2 TD
- MSU – LJ Scott: 23 carries, 84 yards

Receiving

- USU – Dax Raymond: 7 receptions, 76 yards
- MSU – Darrell Stewart Jr.: 7 receptions, 55 yards

The Spartans opened the 2018 season under the lights at home against Mountain West opponent Utah State.

Utah State received the opening kickoff and took little time scoring on their opening drive, taking only just over two minutes to score on a Jordan Love one-yard run. The MSU offense stalled at midfield on their first drive, but Matt Coghlin made a 49-yard field goal to put the Spartans on the board, 7–3. After a turnover on downs on the following Utah State possession, Michigan State added another field goal, bringing them within a point. The second quarter featured sloppy play from both teams. As Michigan State was driving into Utah State territory, Brian Lewerke was sacked and attempted to throw the ball away. After review, the officials determined that Lewerke had not completed a forward throwing motion, that he had fumbled the ball, and it was recovered by Utah State. However, the Aggies did not score off of the turnover. Several possessions later, the Aggies committed a turnover of their own when Jordan Love threw an interception that resulted in Michigan State points when Brian Lewerke connected with Cody White on a seven-yard pass for a touchdown. The score gave the Spartans their first lead of the game, 13–7. Utah State answered with a touchdown of their own on the following possession, retaking the lead 14–13. The Spartan offense drove deep into Utah State territory and Felton Davis scored on a 10-yard touchdown pass from Brian Lewerke with 28 seconds left in the half to give MSU a 20–14 lead at halftime.

The Spartans extended their lead after in the second half when a 17-yard Connor Heyward touchdown run increased their lead to 27–14. Late in the third quarter, Utah State added a field goal to narrow the lead to 27–17. The following Michigan State possession ended in disaster when a Brian Lewerke pass intended for Jalen Nailor was intercepted and returned for a touchdown by Gage Ferguson to bring Utah State within three, 27–24. Michigan State increase their lead with a field goal early in the fourth quarter, but Utah State retook the lead with five minutes remaining in the game on a Darwin Thompson one-yard touchdown run. Brian Lewerke led the offense down the field the following possession, completing five straight passes before Connor Heyward scored the go-ahead touchdown on an option pitch from Lewerke to give Michigan State a 36–31 lead with two minutes remaining. Lewerke then connected with Davis on the two-point conversion pass to give MSU a 38–31 lead. With less than two minutes remaining, Utah State drove the ball to the MSU 46-yard line. However, MSU linebacker Joe Bachie leapt to deflect a pass and secured the interception to seal the win for the Spartans, avoiding a major upset. Michigan State extended its home opening winning streak to 20 games with the victory.

=== At Arizona State ===
Week Two: Michigan State at Arizona State – Game summary

Quarter	1	2	3	4	Total
No. 15 Michigan State	0	3	10	0	13
Arizona State	0	0	3	13	16

at Sun Devil Stadium, Tempe, AZ

- Date: September 8, 2018
- Game time: 10:45 pm EDT
- Game weather: Clear skies, 100 °F (38 °C)
- Game attendance: 53,599
- Referee: Mike Cannon
- TV announcers (ESPN): Dave Pasch (Play-by-play), Greg McElroy (analyst), Tom Luginbill (sideline)

Game information

First Quarter

- No scoring plays

Second Quarter

- (13:19) MSU – Matt Coghlin 37-yard field goal (Drive: 13 plays, 80 yards, 7:31; Michigan State 3–0)

Third Quarter

- (9:37) MSU – Matt Coghlin 28-yard field goal (Drive: 12 plays, 65 yards, 5:23; Michigan State 6–0)
- (7:48) ASU – Brandon Ruiz 49-yard field goal (Drive: 7 plays, 44 yards, 1:49; Michigan State 6–3)
- (1:27) MSU – Cody White 31-yard pass from Brian Lewerke, Matt Coghlin kick (Drive: 6 plays, 70 yards, 3:15; Michigan State 13–3)

Fourth Quarter

- (14:19) ASU – Brandon Ruiz 24-yard field goal (Drive: 9 plays, 70 yards, 2:02; Michigan State 13–6)
- (8:45) ASU – N'Keal Harry 27-yard pass from Manny Wilkins, Brandon Ruiz kick (Drive: 2 plays, 65 yards, 0:27; Tied 13–13)
- (0:00) ASU – Brandon Ruiz 28-yard field goal (Drive: 13 plays, 69 yards, 4:55; Arizona State 16–13)

Passing

- MSU – Brian Lewerke – 27/39, 314 yards, TD, INT
- ASU – Manny Wilkins – 30/48, 380 yards, TD, INT

Rushing

- MSU – Connor Heyward – 5 carries, 22 yards
- ASU – Eno Benjamin – 13 carries, 27 yards

Receiving

- MSU – Cody White – 9 receptions, 113 yards, TD
- ASU – Kyle Williams – 7 receptions, 104 yards

=== At Indiana ===
Week Three: Michigan State at Indiana – Game summary

Quarter	1	2	3	4	Total
No. 24 Michigan State	14	7	7	7	35
Indiana	0	7	0	14	21

at Memorial Stadium, Bloomington, IN

- Date: September 22, 2018
- Game time: 7:30 p.m. EDT
- Game weather: Cloudy, 63 °F (17 °C)
- Game attendance: 45,445
- Referee: Mark Kluczynski
- TV announcers (BTN): Brandon Gaudin (Play-by-play), Glen Mason (analyst), Elise Menaker (sideline)

Game information

First Quarter

- (8:11) MSU TD: Jalen Nailor 16-yard pass from Brian Lewerke, Matt Coughlin kick
  Michigan State 7–0; 8 plays, 60 yards, 3:57
- (5:35) MSU TD: Shakur Brown 69-yard interception return, Matt Coughlin kick
  Michigan State 14–0

Second Quarter

- (6:54) IU TD: Stevie Scott 8-yard pass from Peyton Ramsey, Logan Justus kick
  Michigan State 14–7; 10 plays, 51 yards, 3:18
- (0:19) MSU TD: Matt Dotson 11-yard pass from Brian Lewerke, Matt Coughlin kick
  Michigan State 21–7; 7 plays, 74 yards, 1:04

Third Quarter

- (4:47) MSU TD: Matt Coughlin 6-yard run, Matt Coughlin kick
  Michigan State 28–7; 9 plays, 67 yards, 4:49

Fourth Quarter

- (14:43) IU FG: Logan Justus 35-yard field goal
  Michigan State 28–10; 4 plays, -11 yards, 0:56
- (8:19) IU TD: Whop Philyor 65-yard pass from Peyton Ramsey, Ramsey pass to Nick Westbrook for 2 points
  Michigan State 28–18; 7 plays, 90 yards, 1:58
- (3:28) IU FG: Logan Justus 36-yard field goal
  Michigan State 28–21; 10 plays, 57 yards, 2:28
- (3:17) MSU TD: Jalen Nailor 75-yard run, Matt Coughlin kick
  Michigan State 35–21; 1 play, 75 yards, 0:11

Passing

- MSU – Brian Lewerke: 14/25, 213 yards, 2 TD, 2 INT
- IU – Peyton Ramsey: 32/46, 272 yards, 2 TD, INT

Rushing

- MSU – Jalen Nailor: 3 carries, 79 yards, TD
- IU – Stevie Scott: 11 carries, 18 yards

Receiving

- MSU – Felton Davis III: 5 receptions, 79 yards
- IU – Whop Philyor: 13 receptions, 138 yards, TD

=== Central Michigan ===
Week Four: Central Michigan at Michigan State – Game summary

Quarter	1	2	3	4	Total
Central Michigan	3	0	0	17	20
No. 21 Michigan State	0	17	14	0	31

at Spartan Stadium, East Lansing, MI

- Date: September 29, 2018
- Game time: 12:00 p.m. EDT
- Game attendance: 73,752
- TV: FS1

Game information

First Quarter

- (13:09) FG CMU: Ryan Tice 45-yard field goal
  Central Michigan 3–0; 5 plays, 43 yards, 1:51

Second Quarter

- (10:57) TD MSU: Brian Lewerke 3-yard run, Matt Coughlin kick
  Michigan State 7–3; 4 plays, 35 yards, 2:03
- (2:03) TD MSU: Brian Lewerke 5-yard run, Matt Coughlin kick
  Michigan State 14–3; 6 plays, 46 yards, 2:52
- (0:29) FG MSU: Matt Coughlin 33-yard field goal
  Michigan State 17–3; 8 plays, 19 yards, 1:29

Third Quarter

- (10:24) TD MSU: Connor Heyward 2-yard run, Matt Coughlin kick
  Michigan State 24–3; 8 plays, 58 yards, 4:27
- (4:18) TD MSU: La'Darius Jefferson 2-yard run, Matt Coughlin kick
  Michigan State 31–3; 8 plays, 44 yards, 4:42

Fourth Quarter

- (13:29) TD CMU: Julian Hicks 10-yard pass from Tommy Lazzaro, Ryan Tice kick
  Michigan State 31–10; 13 plays, 75 yards, 5:49
- (12:08) FG CMU: Ryan Tice 40-yard field goal
  Michigan State 31–13; 6 plays, 26 yards, 1:19
- (6:44) TD CMU: Tony Poljan 29-yard pass from Jonathan Ward, Ryan Tice kick
  Michigan State 31–20; 8 plays, 69 yards, 3:06

Passing

- CMU – Tommy Lazzaro: 19/34, 153 yards, TD
- MSU – Brian Lewerke: 16/25, 185, INT

Rushing

- CMU – Tommy Lazzaro: 11 carries, 32 yards
- MSU – La'Darius Jefferson: 13 carries, 56 yards, TD

Receiving

- CMU – Brandon Childress: 3 receptions, 46 yards
- MSU – Felton Davis III: 3 receptions, 66 yards

=== Northwestern ===
Week Five: Northwestern at Michigan State – Game summary

Quarter	1	2	3	4	Total
Northwestern	7	7	8	7	29
No. 20 Michigan State	3	3	13	0	19

at Spartan Stadium, East Lansing, MI

- Date: October 6, 2018
- Game time: 12:00 p.m. EDT
- Game attendance: 72,850
- TV: FS1

Game information

First Quarter
Second Quarter
Third Quarter
Fourth Quarter

Passing

- NW –
- MSU –

Rushing

- NW –
- MSU –

Receiving

- NW –
- MSU –

=== At Penn State ===
Week Six: Michigan State at Penn State – Game summary

Quarter	1	2	3	4	Total
Michigan State	0	7	7	7	21
No. 8 Penn State	7	7	0	3	17

at Beaver Stadium, University Park, PA

- Date: October 13, 2018
- Game time: 3:30 p.m. EDT
- Game weather: 50 °F (10 °C); cool, cloudy
- Game attendance: 106,685
- Referee: Michael Cannon
- TV announcers (BTN): Kevin Kugler (Play-by-play), James Laurinaitis (analyst), Lisa Byington (sideline)

Game information

First Quarter

- (5:03) PSU TD: K. J. Hamler 5-yard pass from Trace McSorley, Jake Pinegar kick
  Penn State 7–0; 4 plays, 94 yards, 1:32

Second Quarter

- (13:25) MSU TD: La'Darius Jefferson 1-yard rush, Matt Coughlin kick
  Tie 7–7; 11 plays, 81 yards, 4:03
- (4:33) PSU TD: Miles Sanders 48-yard rush, Jake Pinegar kick
  Penn State 14–0; 5 plays, 64 yards, 2:18

Third Quarter

- (6:10) MSU TD: Felton Davis 20-yard pass from Brian Lewerke, Matt Coughlin kick
  Tie 14–14; 5 plays, 64 yards, 2:16

Fourth Quarter

- (9:21) PSU FG: Jake Pinegar 20-yard field goal
  Penn State 17–14; 11 plays, 55 yards, 5:15
- (0:19) MSU TD: Felton Davis 25-yard pass from Brian Lewerke, Matt Coughlin kick
  Michigan State 21–17; 8 plays, 76 yards, 1:00

Passing

- MSU – Brian Lewerke: 24/52, 258 yards, 2 TD, INT
- PSU – Trace McSorley: 19/32, 192 yards, TD

Rushing

- MSU – La'Darius Jefferson: 15 carries, 60 yards, TD
- PSU – Miles Sanders: 17 carries, 162 yards, 2 TD

Receiving

- MSU – Felton Davis III: 8 receptions, 100 yards, 2 TD
- PSU – K. J. Hamler: 5 receptions, 66 yards, TD

=== Michigan ===
Paul Bunyan Trophy: #6 Michigan Wolverines (6–1) at #24 Michigan State Spartans (4–2)

Quarter	1	2	3	4	Total
Michigan	0	7	7	7	21
Michigan State	0	0	7	0	7

at Spartan Stadium • East Lansing, Michigan

- Date: October 20
- Game time: 12:05 p.m.
- Game weather: Partly cloudy • 52 °F (11 °C) • Wind 13 W
- Game attendance: 76,131
- Referee: Jerry McGinn
- TV announcers (Fox): Gus Johnson, Joel Klatt, and Jenny Taft
- Box Score

Game information

Michigan

- Shea Patterson
  14/25, 212 Yds, 2 TD
- Karan Higdon
  33 Rush, 144 Yds
- Donovan Peoples-Jones
  1 Rec, 79 Yds, TD

Michigan State

- Brian Lewerke
  5/25, 66 Yds
- LJ Scott
  10 Rush, 25 Yds
- Darrell Stewart
  2 Rec, 24 Yds

Scoring summary

Quarter	Time	Drive			Team	Scoring information	Score	
Quarter	Time	Plays	Yards	TOP	Team	Scoring information	MICH	MSU
2	14:55	14	84	7:56	Michigan	Nico Collins 6-yard touchdown reception from Shea Patterson, Quinn Nordin kick good	7	0
3	11:12	2	7	0:48	Michigan State	Brian Lewerke 4-yard touchdown reception from Darrell Stewart, Matt Coghlin kick good	7	7
3	2:24	1	79	0:11	Michigan	Donovan Peoples-Jones 79-yard touchdown reception from Shea Patterson, Quinn Nordin kick good	14	7
4	10:21	13	84	6:41	Michigan	Ben Mason 5-yard touchdown run, Quinn Nordin kick good	21	7
"TOP" = time of possession. For other American football terms, see Glossary of American football.							21	7

=== Purdue ===
Week Eight: Purdue at Michigan State – Game summary

Quarter	1	2	3	4	Total
Purdue	3	3	7	0	13
Michigan State	6	7	3	7	23

at Spartan Stadium, East Lansing, MI

- Date: October 27, 2018
- Game time: 12:02 p.m. EDT
- Game weather: 37°F, Clear, NW 18 MPH
- Game attendance: 72,657
- Referee: Ron Snodgrass
- TV announcers (ESPN): Mark Jones (Play-by-Play), Dusty Dvoracek (Analyst) & Molly McGrath (Sideline)

Game information

First Quarter

- (11:07) MSU FG: Matt Coghlin 43-yard field goal
  Michigan State 3–0; 7 plays, 24 yards, 2:03
- (8:11) PUR FG: Spencer Evans 28-yard field goal
  Tied 3–3; 6 plays, 20 yards, 1:35
- (3:23) MSU FG: Matt Coghlin 48-yard field goal
  Michigan State 6–3; 11 plays, 42 yards, 4:44

Second Quarter

- (6:33) PUR FG: Spencer Evans 35-yard field goal
  Tied 6–6; 11 plays, 48 yards, 4:53
- (0:56) MSU TD: Darrell Stewart 11-yard pass from Rocky Lombardi, Matt Coghlin kick
  Michigan State 13–6; 9 plays, 87 yards, 1:26

Third Quarter

- (3:08) MSU FG: Matt Coghlin 34-yard field goal
  Michigan State 16–6; 10 plays, 34 yards, 4:39
- (0:35) PUR FG: Terry Wright 1-yard run, Spencer Evans kick
  Michigan State 16–13; 7 plays, 74 yards, 2:26

Fourth Quarter

- (1:58) MSU TD: Jalen Nailor 48-yard pass from Rocky Lombardi, Matt Coghlin kick
  Michigan State 23–13; 6 plays, 75 yards, 1:44

Passing

- PUR – David Blough – 29/49, 277 yards, 3 INT
- MSU – Rocky Lombardi – 26/46, 318 yards, 2 TD

Rushing

- PUR – D. J. Knox – 7 carries, 51 yards
- MSU – LJ Scott – 15 carries, 52 yards

Receiving

- PUR – Brycen Hopkins – 4 receptions, 80 yards
- MSU – Jalen Nailor – 3 receptions, 70 yards, TD

=== At Maryland ===
Week Nine: Michigan State at Maryland – Game summary

Quarter	1	2	3	4	Total
Michigan State	10	0	7	7	24
Maryland	0	3	0	0	3

at Maryland Stadium, College Park, MD

- Date: November 3, 2018
- Game time: 12:00 p.m. EDT
- Game attendance: 31,735
- TV: ESPN2

Game information

First Quarter
Second Quarter
Third Quarter
Fourth Quarter

Passing

- MSU –
- UMD –

Rushing

- MSU –
- UMD –

Receiving

- MSU –
- UMD –

=== Ohio State ===
Week Ten: Ohio State at Michigan State – Game summary

Quarter	1	2	3	4	Total
No. 8 Ohio State	0	7	2	17	26
No. 24 Michigan State	0	3	3	0	6

at Spartan Stadium, East Lansing, MI

- Date: November 10, 2018
- Game time: 12:05 p.m. EST
- Game weather: 33 °F (1 °C), Overcast & Flurries, WNW 14 miles per hour (23 km/h)
- Game attendance: 74,633
- Referee: John O'Neill
- TV announcers (FOX): Gus Johnson and Joel Klatt

Game information

First Quarter

No scoring plays

Second Quarter

- (1:29) OSU TD: P. Campbell 1-yard pass from Dwayne Haskins, Blake Haubeil kick
  Ohio State 7–0; 11 plays, 55 yards, 4:26
- (0:30) MSU FG: Matt Coghlin 44-yard field goal
  Ohio State 7–3; 7 plays, 49 yards, 0:59

Third Quarter

- (5:35) MSU FG: Matt Coghlin 38-yard field goal
  Ohio State 7–6; 8 plays, 74 yards, 2:45
- (0:42) OSU: TEAM 1-yard safety
  Ohio State 9–6

Fourth Quarter

- (14:03) OSU TD: Dre'Mont Jones 0-yard fumble recovery, Blake Haubeil kick
  Ohio State 16–6
- (12:22) OSU FG: Blake Haubeil 35-yard field goal
  Ohio State 19–6; 4 plays, -3 yards, 1:34
- (1:12) OSU TD: Mike Weber 2-yard run, Blake Haubeil kick
  Ohio State 26–6; 9 plays, 42 yards, 3:59

Passing

- OSU – Dwayne Haskins – 24/39, 227 yards, TD
- MSU – Brian Lewerke – 11/28, 128 yards, INT

Rushing

- OSU – Mike Weber – 22 carries, 104 yards, TD
- MSU – Rocky Lombardi – 3 carries, 49 yards

Receiving

- OSU – Terry McLaurin – 5 receptions, 63 yards
- MSU – Cody White – 8 receptions, 115 yards

=== At Nebraska ===
Week Eleven: Michigan State at Nebraska – Game summary

Quarter	1	2	3	4	Total
Michigan State	3	0	0	3	6
Nebraska	0	0	0	9	9

at Memorial Stadium, Lincoln, NE

- Date: November 17, 2018
- Game time: 12:00 p.m. EST
- Game weather: Overcast, 27 °F (−3 °C), N/NE 16 miles per hour (26 km/h)
- Game attendance: 88,793
- Referee: Don Capron
- TV announcers (FOX): Brian Custer and Ben Leber

Game information

First Quarter

- (7:46) MSU FG: Matt Coghlin 34-yard field goal
  Michigan State 3–0; 10 plays, 50 yards, 4:45

Second Quarter

No scoring plays

Third Quarter

No scoring plays

Fourth Quarter

- (12:13) MSU FG: Matt Coghlin 26-yard field goal
  Michigan State 6–0; 11 plays, 66 yards, 6:14
- (11:07) NEB FG: Barret Pickering 36-yard field goal
  Michigan State 6–3; 5 plays, 36 yards, 1:00
- (8:07) NEB FG: Barret Pickering 20-yard field goal
  Tied 6–6; 7 plays, 17 yards, 2:02
- (5:13) NEB FG: Barret Pickering 47-yard field goal
  Nebraska 9–6; 6 plays, 23 yards, 1:59

Passing

- MSU – Rocky Lombardi – 15/41, 146 yards, INT
- NEB – Adrian Martinez – 16/37, 145 yards

Rushing

- MSU – Connor Heyward – 21 carries, 80 yards
- NEB – Devine Ozigbo – 18 carries, 74 yards

Receiving

- MSU – Connor Heyward – 5 receptions, 78 yards
- NEB – Stanley Morgan Jr. – 4 receptions, 67 yards

=== Rutgers ===
Week Twelve: Rutgers at Michigan State – Game summary

Quarter	1	2	3	4	Total
Rutgers	0	7	0	3	10
Michigan State	0	7	0	7	14

at Spartan Stadium, East Lansing, MI

- Date: November 24, 2018
- Game time: 4:11 p.m. EST
- Game weather: 46 °F (8 °C), Cloudy, Light Mist, SW 9 miles per hour (14 km/h)
- Game attendance: 64,951
- Referee: Jeff Servinski
- TV: FOX

Game information

First Quarter

- (6:15) RUT TD: Travis Vokolek 27-yard pass from Giovanni Rescigno, Justin Davidovicz kick
  Rutgers 7–0; 5 plays, 33 yards, 2:19

Second Quarter

- (7:04) MSU TD: Matt Sokol 18-yard pass from Rocky Lombardi, Matt Coghlin kick
  Tied 7–7; 7 plays, 81 yards, 3:09

Third Quarter

No scoring plays

Fourth Quarter

- (7:52) RUT FG: Justin Davidovicz 34-yard field goal
  Rutgers 10–7; 4 plays, 9 yards, 1:57
- (3:57) MSU TD: Cody White 22-yard run, Matt Coghlin kick
  Michigan State 14–10; 4 plays, 35 yards, 0:42

Passing

- RUT – Giovanni Rescigno – 9/17, 109 yards, TD, INT
- MSU – Rocky Lombardi – 19/43, 173 yards, TD, INT

Rushing

- RUT – Giovanni Rescigno – 13 carries, 61 yards
- MSU – Connor Heyward – 19 carries, 81 yards

Receiving

- RUT – Travis Vokolek – 4 receptions, 69 yards, TD
- MSU – Darrell Stewart – 7 receptions, 53 yards

=== Vs. Oregon (Redbox Bowl) ===
2018 Redbox Bowl: Michigan State vs Oregon – Game summary

Quarter	1	2	3	4	Total
Michigan State	0	0	6	0	6
Oregon	0	0	0	7	7

at Levi's Stadium, Santa Clara, CA

- Date: December 31, 2018
- Game time: 12:00 p.m. PST
- Game attendance: 30,212
- Referee: Reggie Smith
- TV announcers (FOX): Joe Davis, Brady Quinn and Bruce Feldman

Game information

First Quarter

No scoring plays

Second Quarter

No scoring plays

Third Quarter

- (9:57) MSU FG: Matt Coghlin 34-yard field goal
  Michigan State 3–0; 12 plays, 64 yards, 4:59
- (1:17) MSU FG: Matt Coghlin 34-yard field goal
  Michigan State 6–0; 8 plays, 31 yards, 3:30

Fourth Quarter

- (11:19) ORE TD: Dillon Mitchell 28-yard pass from Justin Herbert, Adam Stack kick
  Oregon 7–6; 6 plays, 77 yards, 1:40

Passing

- MSU – Brian Lewerke – 22/40, 172 yards, INT
- ORE – Justin Herbert – 19/33, 166 yards, TD

Rushing

- MSU – LJ Scott – 24 carries, 84 yards
- ORE – C. J. Verdell – 14 carries, 43 yards

Receiving

- MSU – Cody White – 6 receptions, 64 yards
- ORE – Dillon Mitchell – 6 receptions, 70 yards, TD

== Rankings ==
Ranking movements Legend: ██ Increase in ranking ██ Decrease in ranking — = Not ranked RV = Received votes
	Week																
Poll	Pre	1	2	3	4	5	6	7	8	9	10	11	12	13	14	15	Final
AP	11	15	25	24	21	20	—	24	RV	RV	24	RV	RV	—	—	—	—
Coaches	12	13	24	23	18	19	RV	RV	RV	RV	RV	RV	RV	—	—	—	—
CFP	Not released									—	18	—	—	—	—	—	Not released

== Awards and honors ==
Individual awards
Player	Award	Ref.
Kenny Willekes	Smith–Brown Defensive Lineman of the Year	

All-Big Ten
Player	Position	Coaches	Media
Kenny Willekes	DL	1	1
Joe Bachie	LB	1	2
Matt Coghlin	K	3	1
Justin Layne	DB	2	2
Raequan Williams	DL	3	3
David Dowell	DB	3	Hon.
Khari Willis	DB	Hon.	3
Andrew Dowell	LB	Hon.	Hon.
Mike Panasiuk	DL	Hon.	Hon.
Felton Davis III	WR	Hon.	Hon.
Connor Heyward	KR	–	Hon.
Hon. = Honorable mention. Reference:

== Players drafted into the NFL ==
Round	Pick	Player	Position	NFL club
3	83	Justin Layne	CB	Pittsburgh Steelers
4	109	Khari Willis	S	Indianapolis Colts
