= 2019 Pinstripe Bowl =

Postseason college football bowl game

2019 New Era Pinstripe Bowl
- 10th Pinstripe Bowl
Michigan State Spartans	Wake Forest Demon Deacons
(6–6)	(8–4)
Big Ten	ACC
27	21
Head coach: Mark Dantonio	Head coach: Dave Clawson
	1	2	3	4	Total
Michigan State	10	10	7	0	27
Wake Forest	7	14	0	0	21
- Date: December 27, 2019
- Season: 2019
- Stadium: Yankee Stadium
- Location: The Bronx, New York, New York
- MVP: Brian Lewerke (QB, Michigan State)
- Favorite: Michigan State by 3.5
- Referee: Cooper Castleberry (Big 12)
- Attendance: 36,895
- Payout: US$4,400,000

United States TV coverage
- Network: ESPN & ESPN Radio
- Announcers: ESPN: Adam Amin (play-by-play); Matt Hasselbeck (analyst); Paul Carcaterra (sideline); ESPN Radio: Chris Carlin (play-by-play); Jack Ford (analyst); C.J. Papa (sideline)

The 2019 Pinstripe Bowl was a college football bowl game played on December 27, 2019, with kickoff at 3:20 p.m. EST on ESPN. It was the 10th edition of the Pinstripe Bowl, and one of the 2019–20 bowl games concluding the 2019 FBS football season. Sponsored by the New Era Cap Company, the game was officially known as the New Era Pinstripe Bowl.

== Teams ==
The game was played between the Michigan State Spartans from the Big Ten Conference and the Wake Forest Demon Deacons from the Atlantic Coast Conference (ACC). This was the first time that the two programs played against each other.

=== Michigan State Spartans ===
Michigan State entered the game with a 6–6 record (4–5 in conference). The Spartans finished in fifth place of the East Division of the Big Ten. Michigan State began their regular season 4–1, then lost five in a row (four of the losses were to ranked teams) before finishing with two wins.

=== Wake Forest Demon Deacons ===
Wake Forest entered the game with an 8–4 record (4–4 in conference). The Demon Deacons finished in a three-way tie for third place in the ACC's Atlantic Division. Wake Forest started 7–1, then ended their season with three losses in four games.

== Game summary ==
2019 New Era Pinstripe Bowl

Quarter	1	2	3	4	Total
Michigan State	10	10	7	0	27
Wake Forest	7	14	0	0	21

at Yankee Stadium • The Bronx, New York, New York

- Date: Friday, December 27, 2019
- Game time: 3:20 p.m. EST
- Game weather: Cloudy • Temperature: 53 °F (12 °C) • Wind: SW 9 mph
- Game attendance: 36,895
- Referee: Cooper Castleberry
- TV announcers (ESPN): Adam Amin (play-by-play)
  Matt Hasselbeck (analyst)
  Paul Carcaterra (sideline)
- ESPN game summary

Game information

First Quarter

- (12:44) WAKE – Jamie Newman 29 yard pass to Kendall Hinton, Nick Sciba kick (Drive: 7 plays, 65 yards, 2:16; Wake Forest 7–0)
- (2:44) MSU – Matt Coghlin 23 yard field goal (Drive: 16 plays, 75 yards, 6:21; Wake Forest 7–3)
- (2:01) MSU – Mike Panasiuk 15 yard interception return, Matt Coghlin kick (Michigan State 10–7)

Second Quarter

- (9:14) WAKE – Jamie Newman 16 yard pass to Donavon Greene, Nick Sciba kick (Drive: 6 plays, 36 yards, 2:08; Wake Forest 14–10)
- (8:13) MSU – Brian Lewerke 8 yard rush, Matt Coghlin kick (Drive: 3 plays, 70 yards, 0:51; Michigan State 17–14)
- (6:19) WAKE – Jamie Newman 45 yard pass to Jack Freudenthal, Nick Sciba kick (Drive: 6 plays, 80 yards, 1:47; Wake Forest 21–17)
- (0:49) MSU – Matt Coghlin 44 yard field goal (Drive: 13 plays, 47 yards, 5:22; Wake Forest 21–20)

Third Quarter

- (10:11) MSU – Brian Lewerke 10 yard pass to Cody White, Matt Coghlin kick (Drive: 10 plays, 73 yards, 4:42; Michigan State 27–21)

Fourth Quarter

- No scoring

Wake Forest jumped out to a 7–0 lead, when quarterback Jamie Newman hit Kendall Hinton for a 29-yard touchdown pass. The Spartans scored ten unanswered points, first on a Matt Coghlin field goal and then on a 15-yard interception return by Mike Panasiuk, to take the lead, 10–7. The Demon Deacons regained the lead on a second quarter touchdown pass from Newman to Donovan Greene, making the score 14–10. The Spartans answered again, scoring a touchdown on an 8-yard scramble by quarterback Brian Lewerke to go ahead 17–14. Newman then threw his third TD pass, this time to Jack Freudenthal, putting Wake Forest up 21–17. MSU tightened the gap to 21–20 with another Coghlin field goal just before halftime. In the third quarter, the lead changed for the fifth time, as Lewerke connected with Cody White for a 10-yard touchdown pass to give MSU a 27–21 lead. This proved to be the final score, as the Spartan defense held Wake Forest scoreless in the second half.

Brian Lewerke, who threw for 320 yards and one touchdown while adding a rushing touchdown, was named the game's Most Valuable Player.

=== Statistics ===
Statistics	MSU	WAKE
First downs	26	17
Plays–yards	79–497	70–351
Rushes–yards	41–177	41–176
Passing yards	320	175
Passing: comp–att–int	26–38–1	12–29–1
Time of possession	35:10	24:50

Team	Category	Player	Statistics
Michigan State	Passing	Brian Lewerke	26/37, 320 yards, 1 TD, 1 INT
Michigan State	Rushing	Elijah Collins	21 carries, 96 yards
Michigan State	Receiving	Cody White	8 receptions, 97 yards
Wake Forest	Passing	Jamie Newman	12/27, 175 yards, 3 TD, 1 INT
Wake Forest	Rushing	Jamie Newman	17 carries, 87 yards
Wake Forest	Receiving	Kendall Hinton	3 receptions, 48 yards, 1 TD
