= 2018 Redbox Bowl =

College football bowl game

- 17th Redbox Bowl
| Michigan State Spartans | Oregon Ducks |
| (7–5) | (8–4) |
| Big Ten | Pac-12 |
| 6 | 7 |
| Head coach: Mark Dantonio | Head coach: Mario Cristobal |
| | 1 | 2 | 3 | 4 | Total |
|---|---|---|---|---|---|
| Michigan State | 0 | 0 | 6 | 0 | 6 |
| Oregon | 0 | 0 | 0 | 7 | 7 |
- Date: December 30, 2018
- Season: 2018
- Stadium: Levi's Stadium
- Location: Santa Clara, California
- MVP: Dillon Mitchell (WR, Oregon) & Josiah Scott (CB, Michigan State)
- Favorite: Oregon by 3
- Referee: Reggie Smith (Big XII)
- Attendance: 30,212
- Payout: US$3,600,000

United States TV coverage
- Network: Fox
- Announcers: Joe Davis, Brady Quinn and Bruce Feldman

The 2018 Redbox Bowl was a college football bowl game that was played on December 31, 2018, at Levi's Stadium in Santa Clara, California, with kickoff at noon PST (3:00 p.m. EST). It was one of the 2018–19 bowl games concluding the 2018 FBS football season. This was the 17th annual edition of a game that has gone by different names, and was known as the Foster Farms Bowl for the previous four years. For 2018 the game was renamed for its new sponsor, the DVD and video game rental company Redbox.

== Teams ==
The game was played between Michigan State of the Big Ten Conference and Oregon of the Pac-12 Conference. The two teams have met six times previously, with each winning three times.

=== Oregon Ducks ===
Oregon received and accepted a bid to the Redbox Bowl on December 2. The Ducks entered the bowl with an 8–4 record (5–4 in conference).

=== Michigan State Spartans ===
Michigan State received and accepted a bid to the Redbox Bowl on December 2. The Spartans entered the bowl with a 7–5 record (5–4 in conference).

== Game summary ==
=== Scoring summary ===
Scoring summary

| Quarter | Time | Drive | | | Team | Scoring information | Score | |
| Quarter | Time | Plays | Yards | TOP | Team | Scoring information | MSU | ORE |
|---|---|---|---|---|---|---|---|---|
| 3 | 9:57 | 12 | 64 | 4:59 | MSU | 34-yard field goal by Matt Coghlin | 3 | 0 |
| 3 | 1:17 | 8 | 31 | 3:30 | MSU | 34-yard field goal by Matt Coghlin | 6 | 0 |
| 4 | 11:19 | 6 | 77 | 1:40 | ORE | Dillon Mitchell 28-yard touchdown reception from Justin Herbert, Adam Stack kick good | 6 | 7 |
| "TOP" = time of possession. For other American football terms, see Glossary of American football. | | | | | | | 6 | 7 |

=== Statistics ===
| | 1 | 2 | 3 | 4 | Total |
|---|---|---|---|---|---|
| Spartans | 0 | 0 | 6 | 0 | 6 |
| Ducks | 0 | 0 | 0 | 7 | 7 |

| Statistics | MSU | ORE |
|---|---|---|
| First downs | 19 | 11 |
| Plays–yards | 86–331 | 60–203 |
| Rushes–yards | 46–159 | 27–37 |
| Passing yards | 172 | 166 |
| Passing: comp–att–int | 22–40–1 | 19–33–0 |
| Time of possession | 37:15 | 22:45 |

| Team | Category | Player | Statistics |
|---|---|---|---|
| Michigan State | Passing | Brian Lewerke | 22/40, 172 yds, 1 INT |
| Michigan State | Rushing | LJ Scott | 24 car, 84 yds |
| Michigan State | Receiving | Cody White | 6 rec, 64 yds |
| Oregon | Passing | Justin Herbert | 19/33, 166 yds, 1 TD |
| Oregon | Rushing | C. J. Verdell | 14 car, 43 yds |
| Oregon | Receiving | Dillon Mitchell | 6 rec, 70 yds, 1 TD |
