= Connor Heyward =

American football player (born 1999)

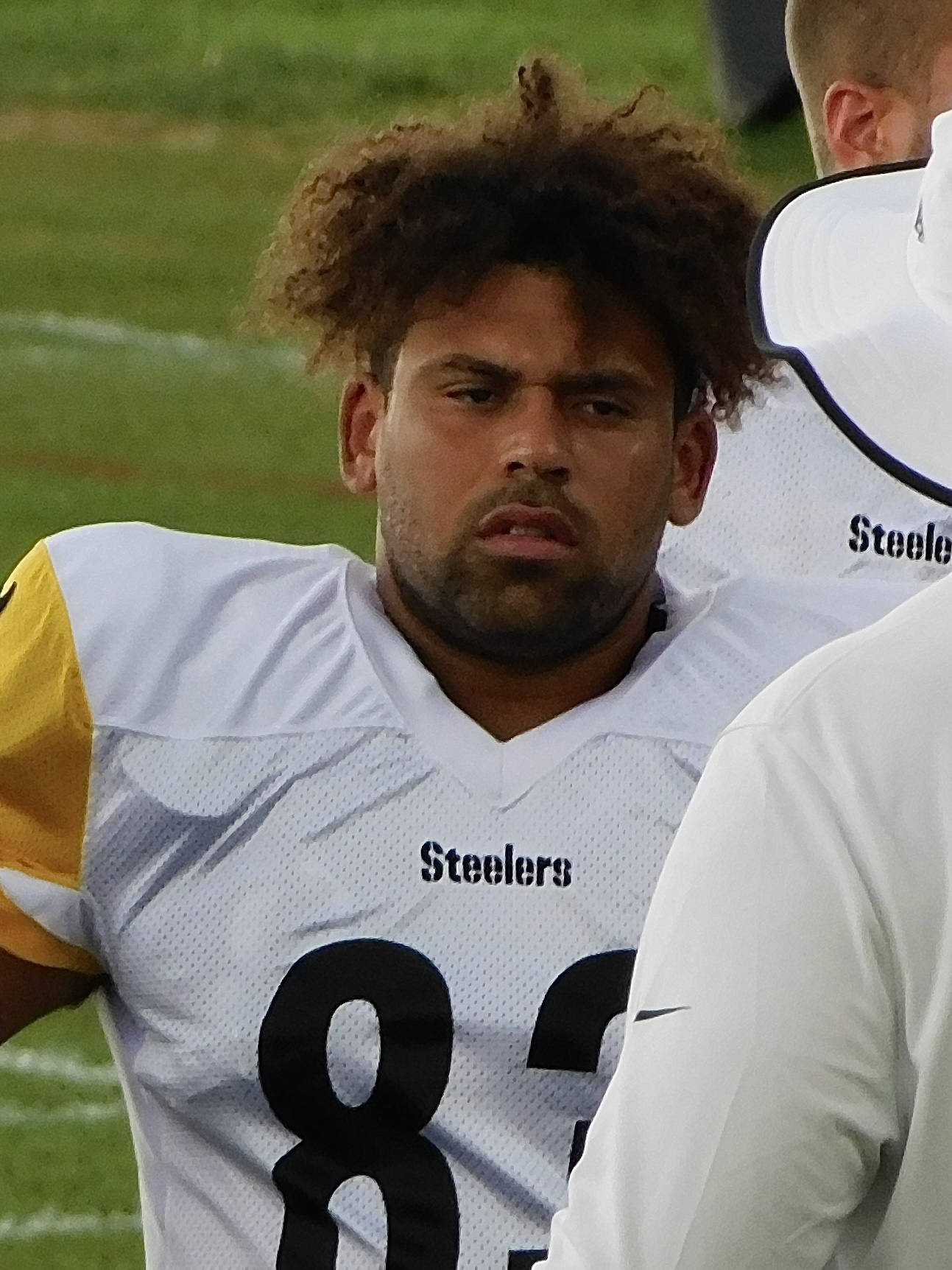
- Heyward with the Pittsburgh Steelers in 2025

No. 34 – Las Vegas Raiders
- Position: Fullback
- Roster status: Active

Personal information
- Born: January 22, 1999 (age 27); Duluth, Georgia, U.S.
- Listed height: 6 ft 0 in (1.83 m)
- Listed weight: 230 lb (104 kg)

Career information
- High school: Peachtree Ridge (Suwanee, Georgia)
- College: Michigan State (2017–2021)
- NFL draft: 2022: 6th round, 208th overall pick

Career history
- Pittsburgh Steelers (2022–2025); Las Vegas Raiders (2026–present)

Career NFL statistics as of Week 7, 2026
- Receptions: 46
- Receiving yards: 401
- Rushing yards: 68
- Total touchdowns: 5
- Stats at Pro Football Reference

Connor Heyward (born January 22, 1999) is an American professional football fullback for the Las Vegas Raiders of the National Football League (NFL). He played college football for the Michigan State Spartans. Heyward is the son of Pro Bowl NFL player Craig Heyward and the younger brother of All-Pro NFL player Cameron Heyward, and the two brothers were teammates during Connor's first four seasons.

== Early life ==
Heyward grew up in Duluth, Georgia and attended Peachtree Ridge High School.

== College career ==
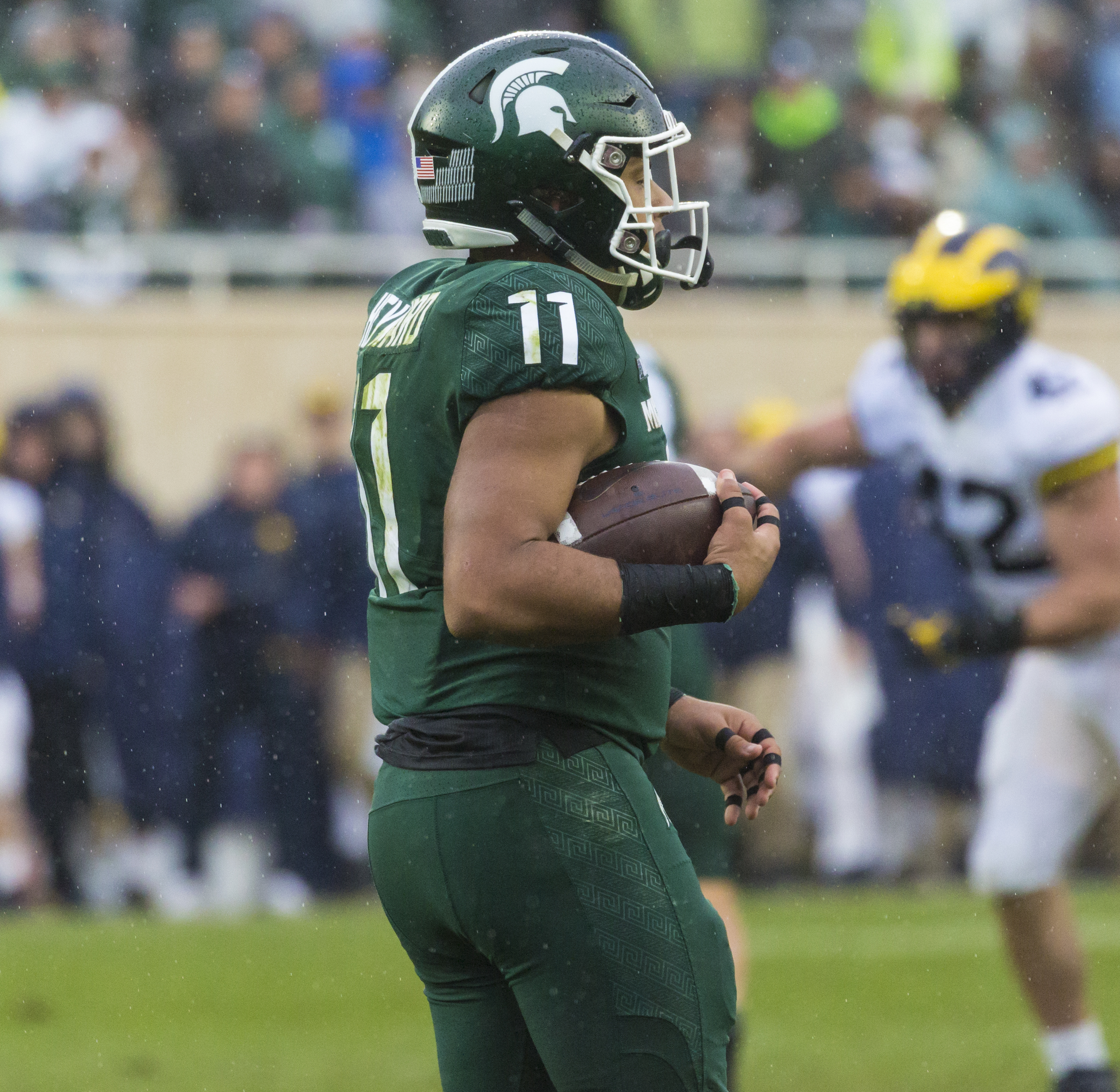
Heyward with Michigan State in 2018

Heyward played college football at Michigan State from 2017 to 2021, beginning his college career as a running back.

On November 25, 2017, Heyward recorded his first collegiate touchdown against Rutgers.

As a sophomore in 2018, he rushed 118 times for 529 yards and five touchdowns and had 32 catches for 249 yards. After losing his starting position after the first game of the 2019 season to Elijah Collins, Heyward later left the team and entered the NCAA transfer portal. He later returned to the team and redshirted the year. Heyward led the Spartans with 65 carries and had 200 rushing yards and two touchdowns with 18 receptions for 71 yards and two touchdowns in the team's COVID-19-shortened 2020 season. Prior to the 2021 season, Heyward moved from running back to H-back. He caught 35 passes for 326 yards and two touchdowns in his final season.

== Professional career ==
Pre-draft measurables
| Height | Weight | Arm length | Hand span | Wingspan | 40-yard dash | 10-yard split | 20-yard split | Vertical jump | Bench press |
|---|---|---|---|---|---|---|---|---|---|
| 5 ft 11 1/8 in (1.81 m) | 233 lb (106 kg) | 31 7/8 in (0.81 m) | 9 1/2 in (0.24 m) | 6 ft 4 1/4 in (1.94 m) | 4.72 s | 1.63 s | 2.74 s | 32.5 in (0.83 m) | 18 reps |
All values from NFL Combine/Pro Day

=== Pittsburgh Steelers ===
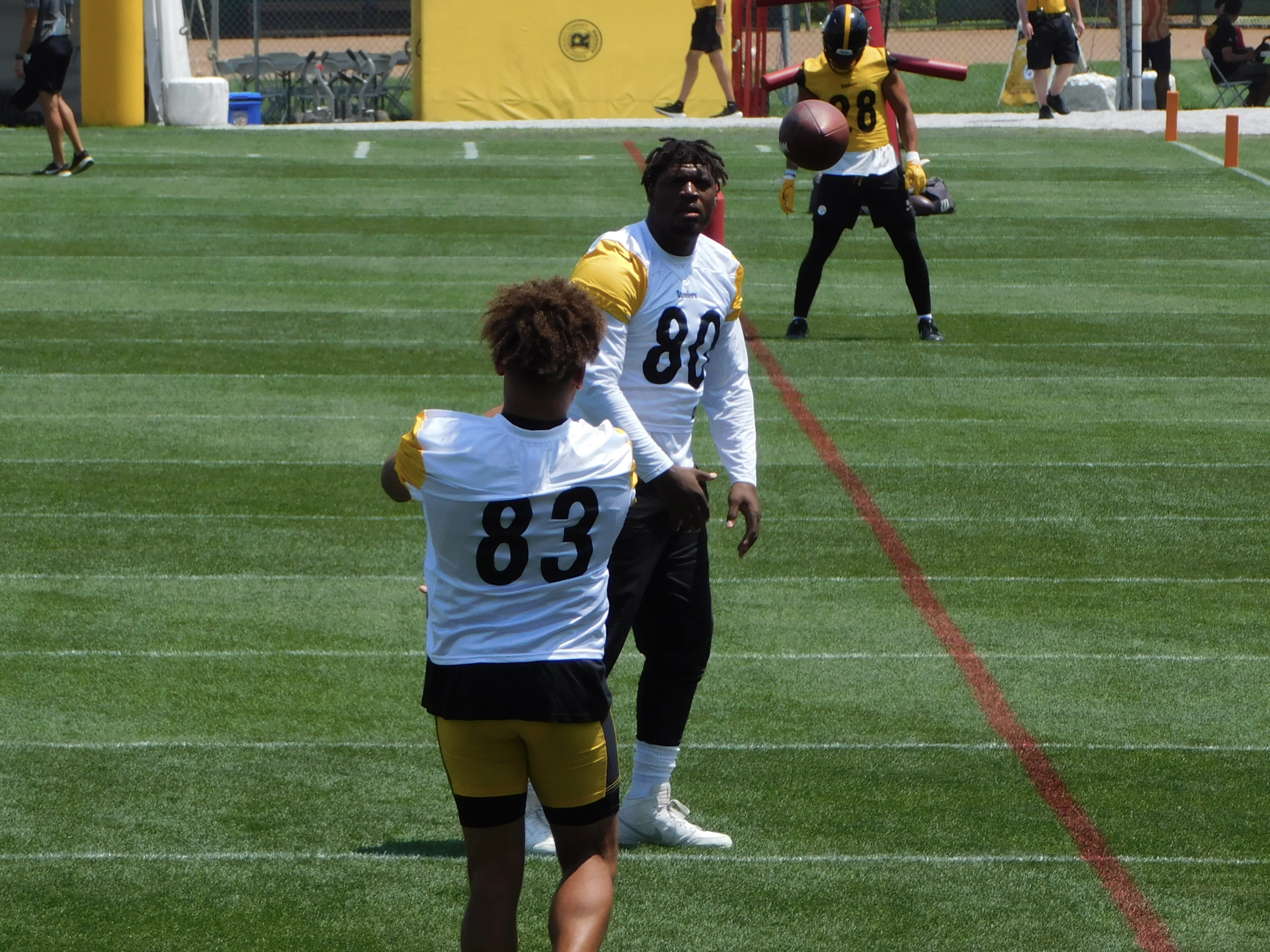
Heyward (83) with the Steelers in 2025

Heyward was selected in the sixth round with the 208th overall pick in the 2022 NFL draft by the Pittsburgh Steelers.

On December 4, 2022, Heyward scored his first professional touchdown during Week 13 at the Atlanta Falcons, a 17-yard catch, getting both feet inbounds at the back of the end zone. In his rookie season, he appeared in 17 games. He finished with 12 receptions for 151 receiving yards and one touchdown. Heyward finished the 2023 season with 23 receptions for 167 yards. Heyward made his first playoff appearance this season in a 31–17 loss to the Buffalo Bills in the AFC Wild card round. He appeared in 17 games and started five in the 2024 season. He had one touchdown, which came in Week 5 against the Dallas Cowboys. He recorded a second postseason appearance in a 28–14 loss to the Baltimore Ravens.

In the 2025 season, Heyward made the Steelers' roster as a hybrid fullback and tight end. Heyward scored a receiving touchdown on a 12 yard reception during Week 6's win over the Cleveland Browns.

Heyward also started playing wildcat quarterback on quarterback designed run plays, including multiple tush push plays. Heyward finished the 2025 season with 15 total carries for 43 yards and two rushing touchdowns and 3 receptions for 21 yards and one receiving touchdown.

=== Las Vegas Raiders ===
On March 13, 2026, the Las Vegas Raiders signed Heyward to a two-year $5.5 million contract with $2 million guaranteed.

== Career statistics ==
Legend
| **Bold** | Career high |

=== NFL ===
==== Regular season ====
| Year | Team | Games | | Receiving | | | | | Rushing | | | | | Fumbles | | | Tackles | | |
| Year | Team | GP | GS | Rec | Yds | Y/R | Lng | TD | Att | Yds | Y/A | Lng | TD | FR | Fum | Lost | Cmb | Solo | Ast |
|---|---|---|---|---|---|---|---|---|---|---|---|---|---|---|---|---|---|---|---|
| 2022 | PIT | 17 | 0 | 12 | 151 | **12.6** | **45** | **1** | 2 | 27 | **13.5** | 21 | 0 | 0 | 0 | 0 | **9** | 3 | **6** |
| 2023 | PIT | 17 | 7 | **23** | **167** | 7.3 | 13 | 0 | 1 | 0 | 0.0 | 0 | 0 | 0 | 0 | 0 | 2 | 1 | 1 |
| 2024 | PIT | 17 | 5 | 6 | 40 | 6.7 | 16 | **1** | 0 | 0 | 0.0 | 0 | 0 | **1** | 0 | 0 | 8 | **6** | 2 |
| 2025 | PIT | 17 | 2 | 3 | 21 | 7.0 | 12 | **1** | **15** | **43** | 2.9 | **29** | **2** | 0 | 0 | 0 | **9** | 3 | **6** |
| Career | | 68 | 14 | 44 | 379 | 8.6 | 45 | 3 | 18 | 70 | 3.9 | 29 | 2 | 1 | 0 | 0 | 28 | 13 | 15 |

==== Postseason ====
| Year | Team | Games | | Receiving | | | | | Rushing | | | | | Fumbles | | |
| Year | Team | GP | GS | Rec | Yds | Y/R | Lng | TD | Att | Yds | Y/A | Lng | TD | FR | Fum | Lost |
|---|---|---|---|---|---|---|---|---|---|---|---|---|---|---|---|---|
| 2023 | PIT | 1 | 0 | **1** | **5** | **5.0** | **5** | 0 | 0 | 0 | 0.0 | 0 | 0 | 0 | 0 | 0 |
| 2024 | PIT | 1 | 0 | 0 | 0 | 0.0 | 0 | 0 | 0 | 0 | 0.0 | 0 | 0 | 0 | 0 | 0 |
| 2025 | PIT | 1 | 0 | 0 | 0 | 0.0 | 0 | 0 | 0 | 0 | 0.0 | 0 | 0 | 0 | 0 | 0 |
| Career | | 3 | 0 | 1 | 5 | 5.0 | 5 | 0 | 0 | 0 | 0.0 | 0 | 0 | 0 | 0 | 0 |

=== College ===
| Year | Team | Games | | Receiving | | | | | Rushing | | | | |
| Year | Team | GP | GS | Rec | Yds | Avg | Lng | TD | Att | Yds | Avg | Lng | TD |
|---|---|---|---|---|---|---|---|---|---|---|---|---|---|
| 2017 | Michigan State | 12 | 0 | 4 | 13 | 3.3 | 7 | 1 | 3 | 10 | 3.3 | 7 | 0 |
| 2018 | Michigan State | 13 | 8 | 32 | 249 | 7.8 | **36** | 0 | **118** | **529** | 4.5 | **80** | **5** |
| 2019 | Michigan State | 4 | 1 | 7 | 52 | 7.4 | 15 | 1 | 24 | 79 | 3.3 | 14 | 0 |
| 2020 | Michigan State | 7 | 6 | 18 | 71 | 3.9 | 13 | **2** | 65 | 200 | 3.1 | 14 | 0 |
| 2021 | Michigan State | 13 | 13 | **35** | **326** | **9.3** | 35 | **2** | 1 | 7 | **7.0** | 7 | 0 |
| Career | | 49 | 28 | 96 | 711 | 7.4 | 36 | 6 | 211 | 825 | 3.9 | 80 | 5 |

== Personal life ==
Heyward is the son of Pro Bowl NFL player Craig Heyward. His older brother, Cameron Heyward, is an All-Pro defensive tackle for the Pittsburgh Steelers. His older brother, Corey Heyward, played college basketball for Georgia Tech.
