= Mike Tressel =

American football player and coach (born 1973)

Current position
- Title: Defensive coordinator
- Team: Wisconsin
- Conference: Big Ten

Biographical details
- Born: September 28, 1973 (age 53)

Playing career
- 1992–1995: Cornell (IA)
- Position: Defensive back

Coaching career (HC unless noted)
- 1996–1997: South Dakota (GA)
- 1998–2000: Wartburg (OL)
- 2001: Wartburg (OC/QB)
- 2002–2003: Ohio State (GA)
- 2004–2006: Cincinnati (LB/ST)
- 2007–2014: Michigan State (LB/ST)
- 2015–2017: Michigan State (co-DC/LB)
- 2018–2019: Michigan State (DC/LB)
- 2020: Michigan State (S)
- 2021–2022: Cincinnati (DC/LB)
- 2023–2025: Wisconsin (DC/ILB)
- 2026–present: Wisconsin (DC)

Mike Tressel (born September 28, 1973) is an American college football coach. He is the defensive coordinator for the University of Wisconsin–Madison. Tressel, the nephew of former Ohio State head coach and Lt. Governor Jim Tressel, joined the University of Cincinnati's football coaching staff under Mark Dantonio in 2004. Tressel followed Dantonio to Michigan State when he was hired there in December 2006. He was named the acting head coach when Dantonio announced his retirement in February 2020. Tressel was one of two Dantonio assistants retained by Dantonio's successor, Mel Tucker.

== Early life and playing career ==
Mike Tressel was born on September 28, 1973. He is the son of Dick Tressel, who served as head football coach at Hamline University from 1978 to 2000. Dick Tressel joined his brother, Jim, on the coaching staff at Ohio State University from 2001 to 2010. Mike's grandfather, Lee Tressel, an NCAA Division III Football Championship-winning coach at Baldwin Wallace University.

Tressel attended Cornell College in Mount Vernon, Iowa, where he was a member of the football and wrestling teams. He was named an Academic All-American in NCAA Division III for five seasons between the two sports. Tressel graduated in 1996 with a degree in mathematics.

== Coaching career ==
=== Early career ===
Tressel began his coaching career as a graduate assistant at the University of South Dakota from 1996 to 1997. He received a master's degree in sports administration from South Dakota in 1998. He then served on the offensive staff at Wartburg College from 1998 to 2001. In 2002, he joined his father and uncle at Ohio State, where he was a graduate assistant assigned to linebackers under defensive coordinator Mark Dantonio. The 2002 Buckeyes team won that season's BCS National Championship Game, the 2003 Fiesta Bowl. In 2004, Tressel followed Dantonio to the University of Cincinnati, serving as linebackers and special teams coach. When Dantonio was hired to be the head coach at Michigan State University in December 2006, Tressel joined him along with seven other Cincinnati assistants.

=== Michigan State ===
Tressel spent his first seven seasons with the Spartans as the linebackers and special teams coach. He was promoted to co-defensive coordinator (with Harlon Barnett) and linebackers coach after the departure of defensive coordinator Pat Narduzzi in 2015. After Barnett was hired at Florida State in 2018, Tressel became the sole defensive coordinator.

In his role as linebackers coach, Tressel oversaw two-time consensus All-American Greg Jones (2009–2010), who was also named the Big Ten Co-Defensive Player of the Year in 2009. Tressel also coached first-team all-conference linebackers Max Bullough (2012–2013) and Joe Bachie (2018).

=== Return to Cincinnati ===
Tressel was hired by Luke Fickell to return to Cincinnati as the defensive coordinator beginning for the 2021 season.
