= Brian Lewerke =

American football player (born 1996)

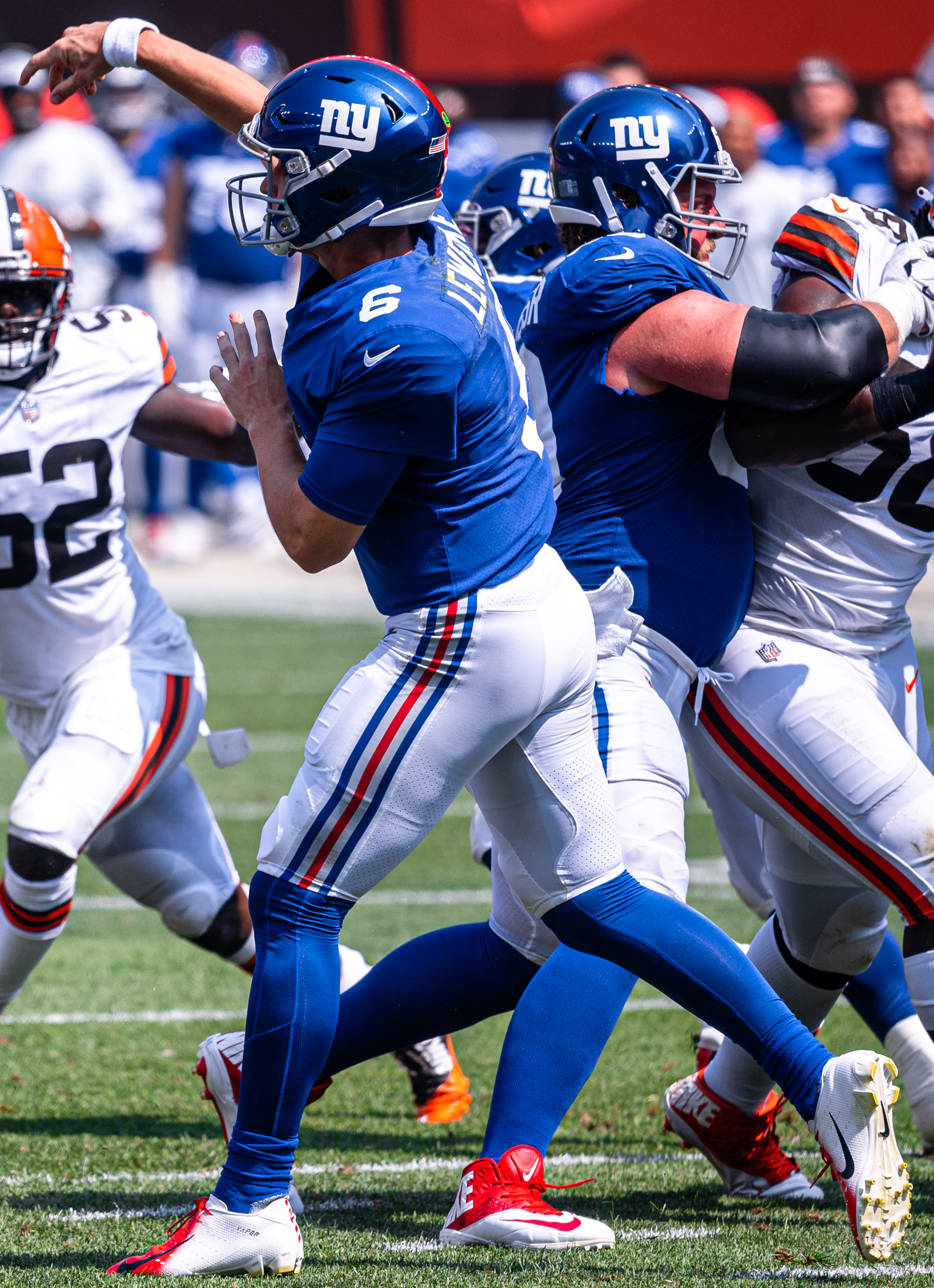
- Lewerke with the New York Giants in 2021

No. 6, 19
- Position: Quarterback

Personal information
- Born: October 24, 1996 (age 30); Tacoma, Washington, U.S.
- Listed height: 6 ft 3 in (1.91 m)
- Listed weight: 216 lb (98 kg)

Career information
- High school: Pinnacle (AZ)
- College: Michigan State (2015–2019)
- NFL draft: 2020: undrafted

Career history
- New England Patriots (2020)*; New York Giants (2021–2022)*; Seattle Sea Dragons (2023)*; Michigan Panthers (2023–2024)
- * Offseason or practice squad member only
- Stats at Pro Football Reference

Brian Lewerke (born October 24, 1996) is an American former professional football quarterback. He played college football for the Michigan State Spartans.

== Early life ==
Lewerke attended Pinnacle High School in Phoenix, Arizona. During his career he had 7,090 yards and 87 touchdowns total. He committed to Michigan State University to play college football.

== College career ==
After redshirting his first year at Michigan State in 2015, Lewerke appeared in four games and made two starts as a redshirt freshman in 2016. His season ended in October after suffering a broken tibia after being tackled by Jabrill Peppers in a game against Michigan. He finished the season completing 31 of his 57 passing attempts for 381 yards, including two touchdowns and an interception.

Lewerke entered the 2017 season as the starting quarterback for the team. He finished his 2017 redshirt sophomore season with 246 completions out of 417 passing attempts, 2793 total yards, 20 touchdowns, and 9 interceptions. Lewerke and the Spartans, who were ranked #19 at the time, also went on to beat Washington State, the #21 ranked team at the time, 42–17 in the 2017 Holiday Bowl, in which Lewerke earned the Offensive MVP award. The Spartans finished the season 10–3, with a final ranking of #15 in the AP poll.

In his junior season in 2018, Lewerke completed 189 out of his 339 passing attempts, threw for 2,040 yards and 8 touchdowns, and threw 11 interceptions. He also ran 90 times for 184 yards and 2 touchdowns, and was sacked 19 times. This gave him a 54.3 completion percentage and a passer rating of 106.1. That season, the Spartans went 7–6 overall, and 5–4 in the Big Ten Conference. The Spartans also made an appearance in the 2018 Redbox Bowl, losing 7–6 to the Oregon Ducks.

In his senior season in 2019, Lewerke completed 234 out of his 399 passing attempts, threw for 2,759 yards and 16 touchdowns, and threw 12 interceptions. He also ran 100 times for 317 yards and 2 touchdowns, and was sacked 17 times. He had a 58.6 completion percentage for the season and a passer rating of 124.0. That season, the Spartans went 7–6 overall, and 4–5 in the Big Ten Conference. The Spartans also made an appearance in the 2019 Pinstripe Bowl, winning 27–21 over the Wake Forest Demon Deacons, in which Lewerke won the MVP award. During this game, Lewerke surpassed former quarterback Connor Cook to become the school's all-time leader in total yards from scrimmage.

== Professional career ==
Pre-draft measurables
Height	Weight	Arm length	Hand span	Wingspan	40-yard dash	10-yard split	20-yard split	20-yard shuttle	Three-cone drill	Vertical jump	Broad jump	Wonderlic
6 ft 2 1/2 in (1.89 m)	213 lb (97 kg)	32 1/8 in (0.82 m)	10 5/8 in (0.27 m)	6 ft 3 1/2 in (1.92 m)	4.95 s	1.65 s	2.80 s	4.40 s	7.14 s	31.0 in (0.79 m)	9 ft 5 in (2.87 m)	30
All values from NFL Combine

=== New England Patriots ===
Lewerke went undrafted in the 2020 NFL draft. On May 5, 2020, Lewerke was signed by the New England Patriots as an undrafted free agent. On July 26, he was waived by New England before training camp opened, but re-signed with the team four days later. Lewerke was waived by the Patriots on September 5.

Lewerke signed with the Alphas of The Spring League on May 2, 2021.

=== New York Giants ===
On August 16, 2021, Lewerke signed with the New York Giants. He was waived by the team on August 31, and was subsequently re-signed to the practice squad. On January 8, 2022, Lewerke was promoted for the team's season finale against the Washington Football Team following injuries to Daniel Jones and Mike Glennon. He signed a reserve/futures contract with the Giants on January 10.

On May 18, 2022, Lewerke was waived by New York.

=== Seattle Sea Dragons ===
On November 15, 2022, Lewerke was assigned to the Seattle Sea Dragons of the XFL. He was released on January 21, 2023.

=== Michigan Panthers ===
Lewerke signed with the Michigan Panthers of the USFL on May 17, 2023. He was released on March 10, 2024. Lewerke was re-signed on March 20.
