= Josiah Scott (American football) =

American football player (born 1999)

Profile
- Position: Cornerback

Personal information
- Born: April 5, 1999 (age 27); Hamilton, Ohio, U.S.
- Listed height: 5 ft 9 in (1.75 m)
- Listed weight: 185 lb (84 kg)

Career information
- High school: Fairfield (OH)
- College: Michigan State (2017–2019)
- NFL draft: 2020: 4th round, 137th overall pick

Career history
- Jacksonville Jaguars (2020); Philadelphia Eagles (2021–2022); Pittsburgh Steelers (2023)*; Philadelphia Eagles (2023); Pittsburgh Steelers (2024)*
- * Offseason or practice squad member only

Awards and highlights
- Second-team All-Big Ten (2019)

Career NFL statistics
- Total tackles: 51
- Sacks: 1
- Interceptions: 2
- Stats at Pro Football Reference

Josiah Scott (born April 5, 1999) is an American professional football cornerback. He played college football for the Michigan State Spartans and was selected by the Jacksonville Jaguars in the fourth round of the 2020 NFL draft.

== College career ==
After playing at Fairfield High School in Fairfield, Ohio, Scott chose Michigan State over scholarship offers from Iowa, West Virginia, Miami of Ohio and others.

As a freshman, Scott was named to ESPN's Freshman All-American team. The award came after he started twelve of thirteen games the Spartans played in, missing one due to injury.

A torn meniscus sidelined Scott for the first eight games of his sophomore season, an injury sustained in a non-contact incident. He was named defensive MVP of the 2018 Redbox Bowl after registering three tackles and four pass breakups in the game.

Scott started all thirteen games his junior season. On October 5 against Ohio State, Scott forced Justin Fields into his first interception of the year, and also garnered 12 tackles during the game.

== Professional career ==
Pre-draft measurables
Height	Weight	Arm length	Hand span	40-yard dash	10-yard split	20-yard split	Bench press
5 ft 9 1/4 in (1.76 m)	185 lb (84 kg)	29 3/8 in (0.75 m)	8 3/4 in (0.22 m)	4.42 s	1.51 s	2.55 s	17 reps
All values from NFL Combine

=== Jacksonville Jaguars ===
Scott was selected by the Jacksonville Jaguars in the fourth round (137th overall) of the 2020 NFL draft. The Jaguars traded cornerback A. J. Bouye to the Denver Broncos to acquire the pick. Scott was placed on the reserve/COVID-19 list by the Jaguars on July 27, 2020, but was activated three days later.

=== Philadelphia Eagles (first stint) ===
Scott was traded to the Philadelphia Eagles in exchange for Jameson Houston and a 2023 sixth-round pick on May 18, 2021. He was placed on injured reserve on September 2. He was activated on October 2.

Scott was waived on August 29, 2023.

=== Pittsburgh Steelers (first stint) ===
On August 31, 2023, Scott was signed to the Pittsburgh Steelers' practice squad. He was placed on the practice squad/injured list on September 14.

=== Philadelphia Eagles (second stint) ===
On October 17, 2023, the Eagles signed Scott to their active roster off of the Steelers' practice squad. He was released on November 28 and re-signed to the practice squad two days later.

He was not signed to a reserve/future contract after the season and became a free agent when his practice squad contract expired.

=== Pittsburgh Steelers (second stint) ===
On January 23, 2024, Scott signed a reserve/futures contract with the Steelers. He was released on July 30, 2024.
