= Mark Dantonio =

American football player and coach (born 1956)

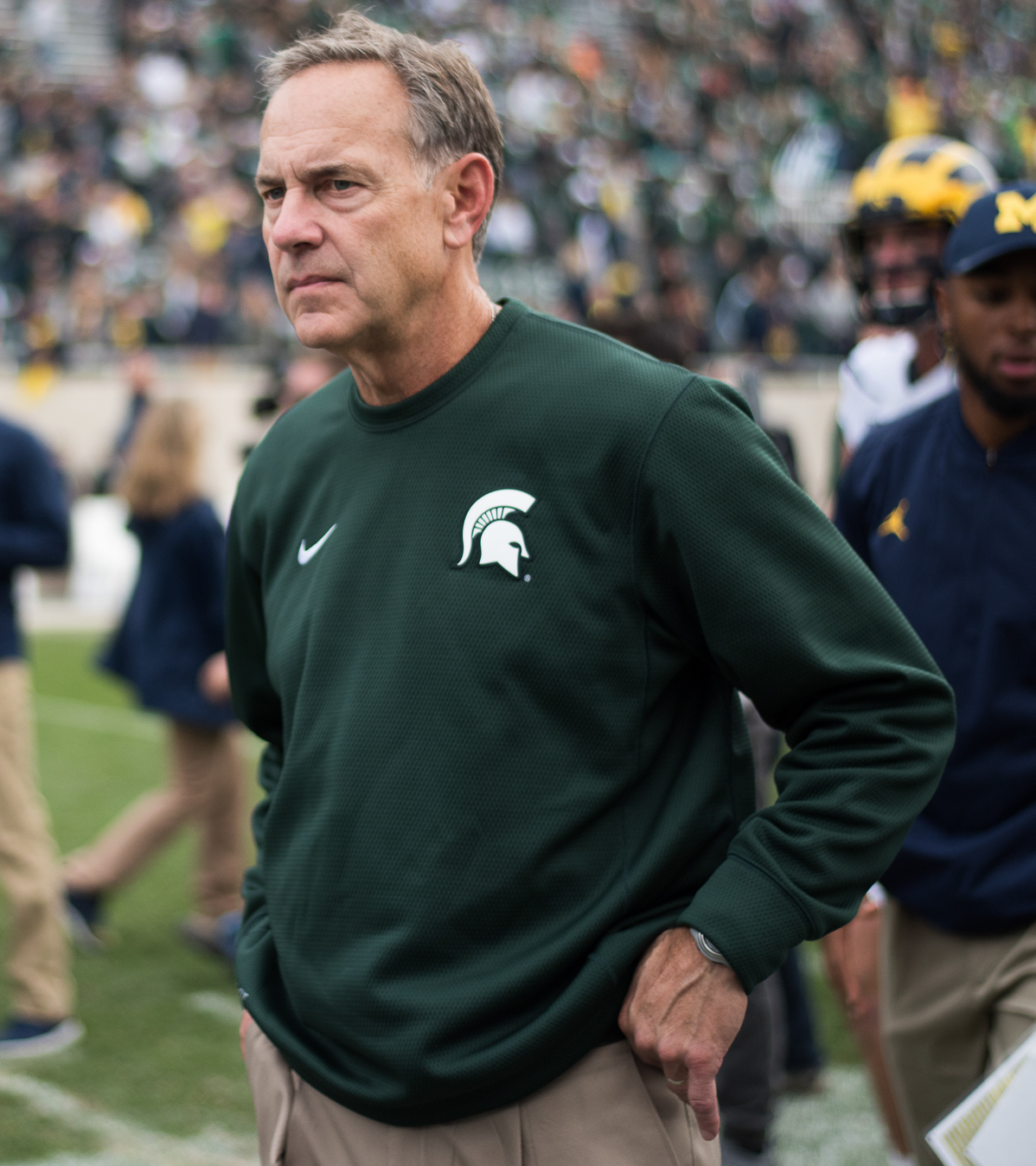
- Dantonio with Michigan State in 2016

Biographical details
- Born: March 9, 1956 (age 70); El Paso, Texas, U.S.

Playing career
- 1976–1978: South Carolina
- Position: Defensive back

Coaching career (HC unless noted)
- 1980: Ohio (GA)
- 1981: Purdue (GA)
- 1982: Butler County (DC)
- 1983–1984: Ohio State (GA)
- 1985: Akron (DB)
- 1986–1990: Youngstown State (DC)
- 1991–1994: Kansas (DB)
- 1995–2000: Michigan State (DB)
- 2001–2003: Ohio State (DC)
- 2004–2006: Cincinnati
- 2007–2019: Michigan State
- 2023: Michigan State (associate HC)

Head coaching record
- Overall: 132–74
- Bowls: 7–6
- Tournaments: 0–1 (CFP)

Accomplishments and honors

Championships
- 3 Big Ten (2010, 2013, 2015); 2 Big Ten Legends Division (2011, 2013); 1 Big Ten East Division (2015)

Awards
- 2× Big Ten Coach of the Year (2010, 2013); Rose Bowl Hall of Fame (2024); Michigan State Athletics Hall of Fame (2025)
- College Football Hall of Fame; Inducted in 2024 (profile)

Mark Justin Dantonio (born March 9, 1956) is an American former college football coach and player. He was the head coach at Michigan State University from 2007 to 2019.

He led the Michigan State Spartans to three Big Ten Conference championships, and eight victories over archrival Michigan in 13 years. In 2013, he coached Michigan State to its first 13-win season and the program's fifth trip to the Rose Bowl, where they defeated Stanford and finished the season ranked No. 3 in the nation. This was the second time a Big Ten team reached the 13-win mark, the previous being Ohio State's national championship season in 2002, where Dantonio was the defensive coordinator. The 2013 season also marked the first time a Big Ten team won nine conference games each by double digits. In 2015, Dantonio became the first head coach in Big Ten history to achieve at least 11 wins in five of six seasons. On December 6, 2015, Dantonio's Spartans qualified for the College Football Playoff for the first time in the program's history.

In 2006, Dantonio was hired as the Spartans' head coach, returning to the school where he served six years as an assistant coach under Nick Saban and Bobby Williams. Known as a defensive-minded coach, Dantonio led the Spartans to the school's first bowl game win since 2001, in the 2012 Outback Bowl, and the school's first Rose Bowl since 1988 in 2014. Dantonio's Spartans hold the active school record with four consecutive bowl wins. On October 8, 2011, Dantonio signed a contract extension that made him a "Spartan for life." In 2014, he earned the second highest salary among college football coaches, due largely to a retention bonus.

On September 21, 2019, with his 110th victory, Dantonio became the winningest head coach in MSU football surpassing Duffy Daugherty. Dantonio had compiled a 110–52 record through this date at Michigan State, giving him a .691 winning percentage, the highest of any Michigan State football coach since Biggie Munn, who coached the Spartans from 1947 to 1953.

Dantonio retired as the head coach of the Michigan State football team in February 2020 after 13 seasons and 114 wins. He briefly rejoined the team in 2023 as an associate head coach in the wake of Mel Tucker's suspension and the elevation of Harlon Barnett to interim head coach.

== Early life ==
Mark Dantonio was born in El Paso, Texas, to Justin Dantonio and Maryan (née Sonsalla) Dantonio. He is of Italian descent (father) and Polish descent (mother). Dantonio's grandfather Frank D'antonio moved from Montenerodomo, Italy, to the United States – losing the apostrophe at Ellis Island – in 1912.

Dantonio's father played basketball at Salem University and met his mother while teaching in El Paso. Mark was the second of four boys. When Mark was one, the family moved to Zanesville, Ohio, where Justin became the vice principal and basketball coach at Zanesville High School. Dantonio was an all-state safety at Zanesville.

== College career ==
Dantonio attended the University of South Carolina and earned three letters as a defensive back for coach Jim Carlen for the Gamecocks from 1976–78. He earned a bachelor's degree in education from South Carolina in 1979. Dantonio later earned a master's degree in education from Ohio University in 1980.

== Coaching career ==
=== Early coaching career ===
Dantonio began his coaching career at Ohio University, where he was a graduate assistant. In 1981, he made his first stop in the Big Ten Conference when he moved on to Purdue University as a graduate assistant. He spent two years, in 1983 and 1984, as a graduate assistant at Ohio State University under head coach Earle Bruce. In 1986, he began a five-year stint on Jim Tressel's staff at Youngstown State University as a defensive secondary coach. In 1990, Dantonio led the Penguins' defense to an 11–0 record and a No. 2 ranking nationally. Glen Mason hired Dantonio in 1991 to be the defensive secondary coach for the Kansas Jayhawks. When Nick Saban was hired at Michigan State in 1995, he hired Dantonio to join his staff in East Lansing where he remained even after Saban left for LSU. After Bobby Williams was named head coach in 1999 following Saban's departure, Dantonio was promoted to associate head coach where he remained through the 2000 season.

At Ohio State in 2001, Dantonio reunited with his former Youngstown State boss and good friend Jim Tressel when he opted out of East Lansing to serve as defensive coordinator at Ohio State University for three seasons. His defense became known as one of the stingiest in the country. During the Buckeyes' 2002 National Championship season, Ohio State ranked second nationally in scoring defense and third in rushing defense. For his efforts, Dantonio was named a 2002 finalist for the Broyles Award, given annually to the nation's top college football assistant coach. In the 2003 season, his defense ranked number one in the country in rushing defense and ninth in total defense, which led the Buckeyes to an 11–2 record and No. 4 national ranking. Six Buckeye defenders were named first team All-Big Ten during Dantonio's tenure. Thirteen were drafted into the NFL, including two first round picks in Chris Gamble and Will Smith.

=== Cincinnati (2004–2006) ===
Dantonio was named head coach at Cincinnati on December 23, 2003. He became the first head coach in 23 years to lead the school to a winning season in his first season at UC. The Bearcats' 7–5 record included a 5–3 record in Conference USA, which was good enough for a second-place finish. The Bearcats finished the season on a winning note with a 32–14 win over Marshall in the Fort Worth Bowl. During Dantonio's time at UC, he led the Bearcats to a bowl game victory and directed the team's transition into the Big East Conference. As head coach, Dantonio had 15 players earn all-conference honors and 25 received conference academic recognition.

=== Michigan State (2007–2020) ===
Mark Dantonio became the 24th head coach at Michigan State on November 27, 2006. Upon his arrival, Dantonio planned to return the Spartans to a more traditional philosophy on offense and defense, eliminating the spread offense and the "bandit" linebacker/safety position used under previous head coach John L. Smith.

==== 2007 season ====
Dantonio began his Michigan State career well at Spartan Stadium when on April 21, 2007, Michigan State drew over 25,000 fans to watch the team's spring scrimmage game. The white team, led by sophomore quarterback Connor Dixon, defeated junior quarterback Brian Hoyer and the green team by a score of 21–8. During the game, Dantonio was seen behind the line of scrimmage watching and coaching the action.

Dantonio won his first game at Michigan State on September 1, 2007, when the Spartans defeated the UAB Blazers, 55–18. His first season at Michigan State was the school's most successful since 2003. Dantonio's Spartans went 7–5, losing all five games by seven points or fewer, and were bowl eligible for the first time in four years. However, the Spartans lost to Boston College in the Champs Sports Bowl in Orlando on December 28.

==== 2008 season ====
Dantonio's second season at MSU began with a loss at Cal, after which the Spartans came home and won six straight games against Eastern Michigan, Florida Atlantic, Notre Dame, Indiana, Iowa, and Northwestern. The victories propelled Michigan State into the top 25. Following a lopsided 45–7 loss to the Ohio State Buckeyes, the Spartans beat Michigan, 35–21, winning in Ann Arbor for the first time since 1990. Michigan State won its final two home games against Wisconsin and Purdue before losing to Penn State in Happy Valley. A win against Penn State would have resulted in Michigan State splitting the Big Ten Conference title with Ohio State. The nine regular season wins were Michigan State's most since 1999. Michigan State finished third in the conference and was invited to play Georgia in the Capital One Bowl. Michigan State lost the game, 24–12, finishing the season 9–4.

==== 2009 season ====
Dantonio's third season, 2009, was disappointing in performance and off-the-field issues. The team lost five games (Central Michigan, at Notre Dame, Iowa, at Minnesota, Texas Tech) in which they held the lead in the fourth quarter, leading to a disappointing 6–7 record.

==== 2010 season ====
On September 19, 2010, just hours after a stunning fake field goal touchdown pass gave MSU a 34–31 overtime victory over Notre Dame, Dantonio checked himself into a hospital after noticing chest pains. He later suffered a heart attack. He had a stent implanted in a blocked artery near his heart. His doctor stated that the damage was minimal and that Dantonio was expected to make a full recovery. Offensive coordinator Don Treadwell became acting head coach while Dantonio recovered.

On September 30, after Dantonio had stated that he would be coaching the next game from the press box and just two days before Michigan State played Wisconsin, Dantonio was admitted back into the hospital as a blood clot was found in his leg. Dantonio had to watch the game from his hospital room. He was reportedly released from Sparrow Hospital around noon on October 4, 2010. On October 9, Dantonio coached his first game since his heart attack against rival Michigan. Michigan State won the game, 34–17, in Ann Arbor.

The Spartans under Dantonio continued to win and on November 20 reached 10–1 on the season, winning all home games for the first time during his tenure. It was just the third time in school history that Michigan State had won 10 or more games in a season, the other two seasons being those of 1965 and 1999. On November 27, 2010, Dantonio's Spartans defeated Penn State 28–22 in Happy Valley to finish the season 11–1 and clinch a share of the Big Ten Championship for the first time since 1990. On December 5, 2010, MSU announced that the Spartans were selected to play in the Capital One Bowl on January 1, 2011, against Alabama (ranked 15th in the BCS standings). The Spartans lost to the Crimson Tide 49–7 and finished 11–2.

==== 2011 season ====
In 2011, Michigan State had another successful year. The Spartans beat the Ohio State Buckeyes on the road for the first time since 1998, defeated arch-rival Michigan, and upset No. 6 Wisconsin on a last-second Hail Mary pass from Kirk Cousins to Keith Nichol. The Spartans finished 10–2 (7–1 in Big Ten play), earning the Legends Division championship and a place in the inaugural Big Ten Championship Game. After coming up just short in a rematch with Wisconsin, MSU was selected to play in the Outback Bowl against the Georgia Bulldogs. Dantonio led his team to a triple-overtime victory, his first bowl win at MSU. The Spartans reached the 11-win mark for the second straight season, finishing 11–3.

==== 2012 season ====
In 2012, Dantonio led the Spartans to a 7–6 record and a Buffalo Wild Wings Bowl win against Texas Christian University. The season started with promise, when preseason No. 13 Michigan State beat No. 24 Boise State; but two games later, the No. 10 Spartans lost to No. 20 Notre Dame, and went on to suffer four home losses in Big Ten play. The defense finished ninth in FBS points allowed, giving up just 16.3 points per game, but the offense struggled to score in several games. MSU lost a 12–10 decision to Michigan, despite the defense keeping the Wolverines out of the end zone the entire game. In May 2013, four months after the end of the 2012 season, Dantonio filmed himself at the Rose Bowl, predicting a successful 2013.

==== 2013 season ====
In 2013, Dantonio's team finished 11–1 in the regular season, including notable victories over Michigan (29–6) and Nebraska (41–28) to secure the third and final Legends Division title. On December 7, 2013, Michigan State, ranked No. 10 at the time of the game, defeated second-ranked Ohio State 34–24 in the Big Ten Championship Game in Indianapolis. The win snapped Ohio State's 24-game winning streak and sent Michigan State to its first Rose Bowl since the 1987–88 season. Michigan State was ranked No. 4 in the final BCS standings, its highest rank since the BCS's inception. The Spartans defeated the fifth-ranked Stanford Cardinal 24–20 in the 100th Rose Bowl Game on January 1, 2014. Dantonio was named Big Ten Football Coach of the Year.

==== 2014 season ====
In 2014, the Spartans finished the regular season 10–2, finishing second in the East division with a 7–1 record and ranked No. 8 in the nation. After losing to third-ranked Oregon in the season's second game, the Spartans reeled off nine wins in their next 10 games. The Spartans earned a bid to the Goodyear Cotton Bowl Classic, part of the New Year's Six bowls, and rallied from 20 points down in the fourth quarter to defeat fifth-ranked Baylor 42–41 and finish the season with an overall record of 11–2. The two losses came against Oregon and Ohio State, the teams that would play in the 2015 College Football Playoff National Championship. After the Cotton Bowl game, Dantonio said "It's a feeling of belief in each other, and that's what we have. We don't give up on each other. Consequently, they don't give up in the game. We just keep playing hard. And that's what we've been able to accomplish."

==== 2015 season ====
The 2015 season included an unlikely 17–14 road win against No. 2 Ohio State, in which the Spartans played without starting quarterback Connor Cook. With the game tied at 14 in the final seconds, Michael Geiger kicked a 41-yard field goal as time expired. This season was also known for its game-changing touchdown following a botched punt on the final play of the Michigan game, giving MSU a shocking 27–23 victory. MSU also defeated Oregon and Penn State to finish the regular season with an 11–1 record, winning the East division with a 7–1 record. Michigan State went on to beat an undefeated Iowa team in the Big Ten Championship Game, and ended the season ranked No. 3 in the nation. The No. 3 ranking earned the Spartans a spot in the NCAA College Football Playoff and the right to play No. 2 ranked Alabama on New Year's Eve for a spot in the Championship game. They lost to eventual National Champion Alabama in the semi-final game (Cotton Bowl), 38–0.

2015 capped a six year stretch in which Michigan State went 65–16, the zenith of Dantonio's tenure.

==== 2016 season ====
In 2016, the Spartans had their worst season under Dantonio, going 1–8 in Big Ten play and finishing the season at 3–9, the program's worst overall record in more than 30 years.

==== 2017 season ====
The 2017 season featured upset wins over No. 7 Penn State at home and No. 7 Michigan on the road. Dantonio moved to 8–3 all-time against in-state rival Michigan, as the Spartans forced five turnovers and defeated the Wolverines 14–10 in Ann Arbor. They finished the regular season at No. 16 in the CFP rankings and second in the B1G East Division (7–2). The Spartans were selected to play the 9–3 Washington State Cougars in the Holiday Bowl on December 28. The Spartans routed the Cougars, 42–17, to finish the season 10–3, giving Dantonio his sixth season of 10+ wins at MSU.

==== 2018 season ====
Michigan State started the season ranked No. 11 in the AP Poll. They avoided an upset by unranked Utah State in the first game of the season, with a late interception from junior linebacker Joe Bachie preserving a 38–31 victory. In the Spartans' second game of the season they lost to Arizona State 16–13. Falling back in the polls, Michigan State then defeated Indiana 35–21. The following week Dantonio's team beat Central Michigan 31–20 in their last non-conference game of the season. Michigan State was then upset at home by Northwestern 29–19 the following week, sending them out of the AP top 25. The following week, the Spartans traveled to play a top 10 team in Penn State. Despite being heavy underdogs, Michigan State stunned Penn State with a last second touchdown pass to win 21–17. On October 20, Michigan State hosted Michigan and lost 21–7. The following week, the Spartans would rebound to beat Purdue by a score of 23–13. MSU then traveled to Maryland and dominated the Terps 27–3. After the win, MSU came home and lost to Ohio State, 26–6, before traveling to Lincoln and losing to Nebraska, 9–6. In the final game of the season, the Spartans narrowly defeated Rutgers by a score of 14–10. MSU finished the regular season 7–5, and went on to lose to Oregon in the Redbox Bowl, 7–6.

The 2018 season featured a number of low-scoring games as MSU's stout defense, ranked in the national top ten in six categories, was offset by an oft-struggling offense that finished in the bottom 20 nationally in six categories.

==== 2019 season ====
Dantonio reshuffled his coaching staff to start the 2019 season. Brad Salem, the quarterbacks coach in 2018 was promoted to offensive coordinator while Dave Warner and Jim Bollman, the co-offensive coordinators in 2018, were reassigned to be the quarterbacks coach and offensive line coach respectively.

After winning its first two games over Tulsa and Western Michigan, Michigan State was ranked No. 18 in the AP Poll. However, in their third game they fell 10–7 at home to Arizona State. The Spartans had appeared to tie the game with a last-second field goal, but they were penalized for having 12 players on the field and forced to attempt the field goal again from five yards further, which they missed. The following week, MSU defeated Northwestern 31–10 to open its B1G schedule. This gave Dantonio his 110th win as Spartans head coach, surpassing Duffy Daugherty for the most football wins in school history.

After defeating Indiana to improve to 4–1, the Spartans' season took a major downturn, losing five games to Ohio State (34–10), Wisconsin (38–0), Penn State (28–7) Illinois (37–34) and Michigan (44–10) consecutively. Against Illinois, the Spartans blew a 28–3 lead in first half and were outscored 27–3 in the fourth quarter at home. The following week at Michigan, the Spartans took an early 7–0 lead in the first quarter but were outscored 44–3 in the final three quarters. In their 12 losses over the 2018–2019 seasons, the Spartans were outscored 139–13 in the fourth quarter.

MSU defeated Rutgers (27–0) and Maryland (19–16) in its final two regular season games to finish at 6–6 and achieve bowl eligibility. The 2019 season concluded on December 27 with a 27–21 win over Wake Forest in the Pinstripe Bowl, giving Dantonio his second consecutive 7–6 season.

On February 4, 2020, Mark Dantonio announced he was retiring as head coach. He left the Michigan State football program as its all-time winningest coach with a record of 114–57 and a .667 winning percentage.

==== 2023 season ====
On September 10, 2023, Dantonio came out of retirement and returned to the Spartans as associate head coach in the wake of Mel Tucker's suspension and the elevation of Harlon Barnett to interim head coach.

== Personal life ==
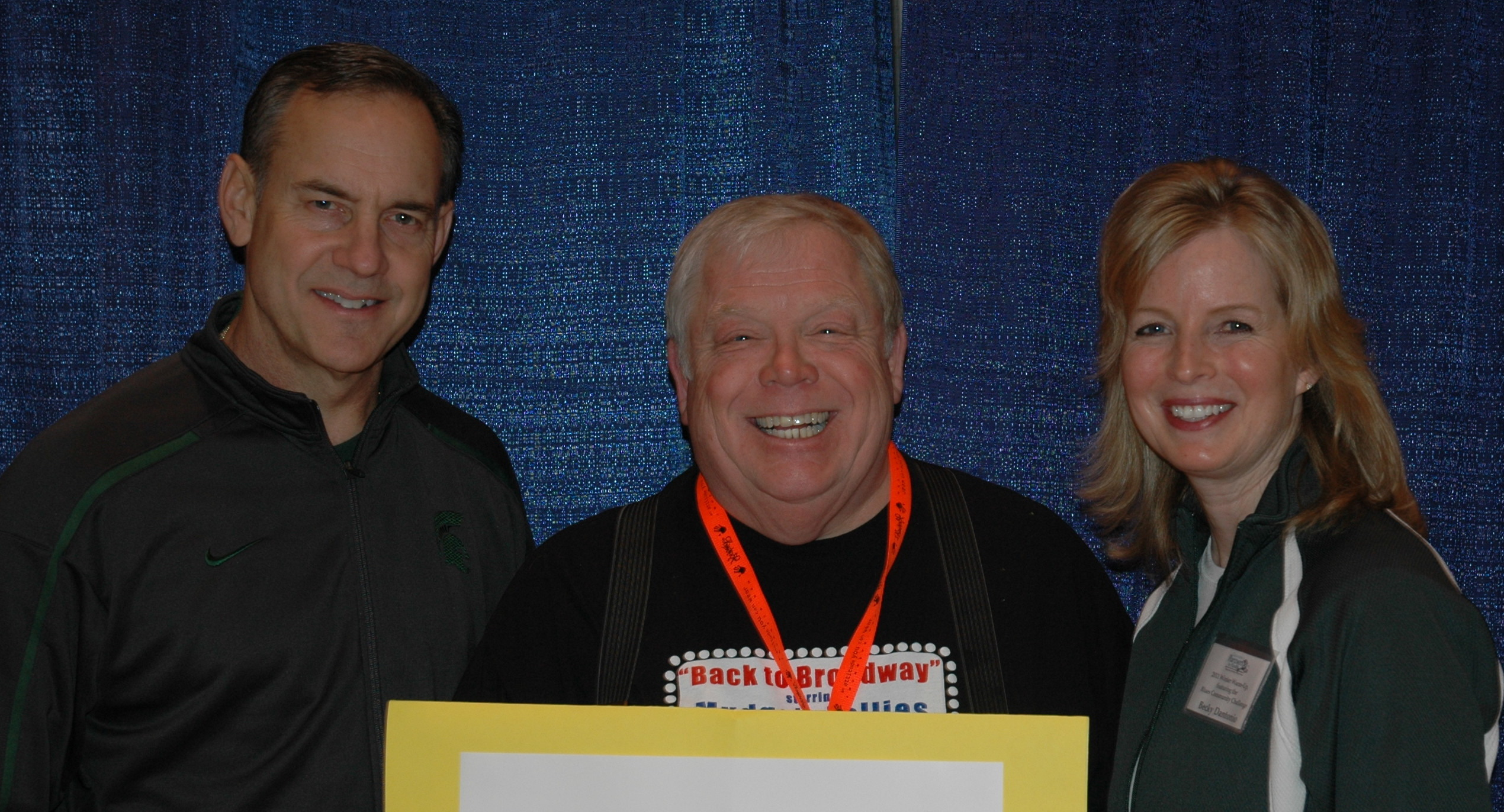
Dantonio (left), with wife, Becky (right), and the mayor of Grand Ledge, Michigan in 2010

Mark Dantonio married his wife, Becky, in 1990. The couple's two daughters, Kristen and Lauren, attended Michigan State. Dantonio is a devout Catholic. The National Polish-American Sports Hall of Fame held its 49th Annual Induction Banquet in June 2022, inducting Dantonio, whose mother was Polish.

== Head coaching record ==
Year	Team	Overall	Conference	Standing	Bowl/playoffs	Coaches^{#}	AP^{°}
Cincinnati Bearcats (Conference USA) (2004)
2004	Cincinnati	7–5	5–3	2nd	W Fort Worth		
Cincinnati Bearcats (Big East Conference) (2005–2006)
2005	Cincinnati	4–7	2–5	6th			
2006	Cincinnati	7–5	4–3	4th	International*		
Cincinnati:		18–17	11–11	*Departed for Michigan State before the Bowl			
Michigan State Spartans (Big Ten Conference) (2007–2019)
2007	Michigan State	7–6	3–5	T–7th	L Champs Sports		
2008	Michigan State	9–4	6–2	3rd	L Capital One	24	24
2009	Michigan State	6–7	4–4	T–6th	L Alamo		
2010	Michigan State	11–2	7–1	T–1st	L Capital One	14	14
2011	Michigan State	11–3	7–1	1st (Legends)	W Outback	10	11
2012	Michigan State	7–6	3–5	4th (Legends)	W Buffalo Wild Wings		
2013	Michigan State	13–1	8–0	1st (Legends)	W Rose^{†}	3	3
2014	Michigan State	11–2	7–1	2nd (East)	W Cotton^{†}	5	5
2015	Michigan State	12–2	7–1	1st (East)	L Cotton^{†}	6	6
2016	Michigan State	3–9	1–8	6th (East)			
2017	Michigan State	10–3	7–2	T–2nd (East)	W Holiday	16	15
2018	Michigan State	7–6	5–4	4th (East)	L Redbox		
2019	Michigan State	7–6	4–5	5th (East)	W Pinstripe		
Michigan State:		114–57	69–39				
Total:		132–74					
National championship Conference title Conference division title or championship game berth
^{†}Indicates BCS or CFP / New Years' Six bowl.; ^{#}Rankings from final Coaches Poll.; ^{°}Rankings from final AP Poll.
