= Dillon Mitchell (gridiron football) =

American gridiron football player (born 1997)

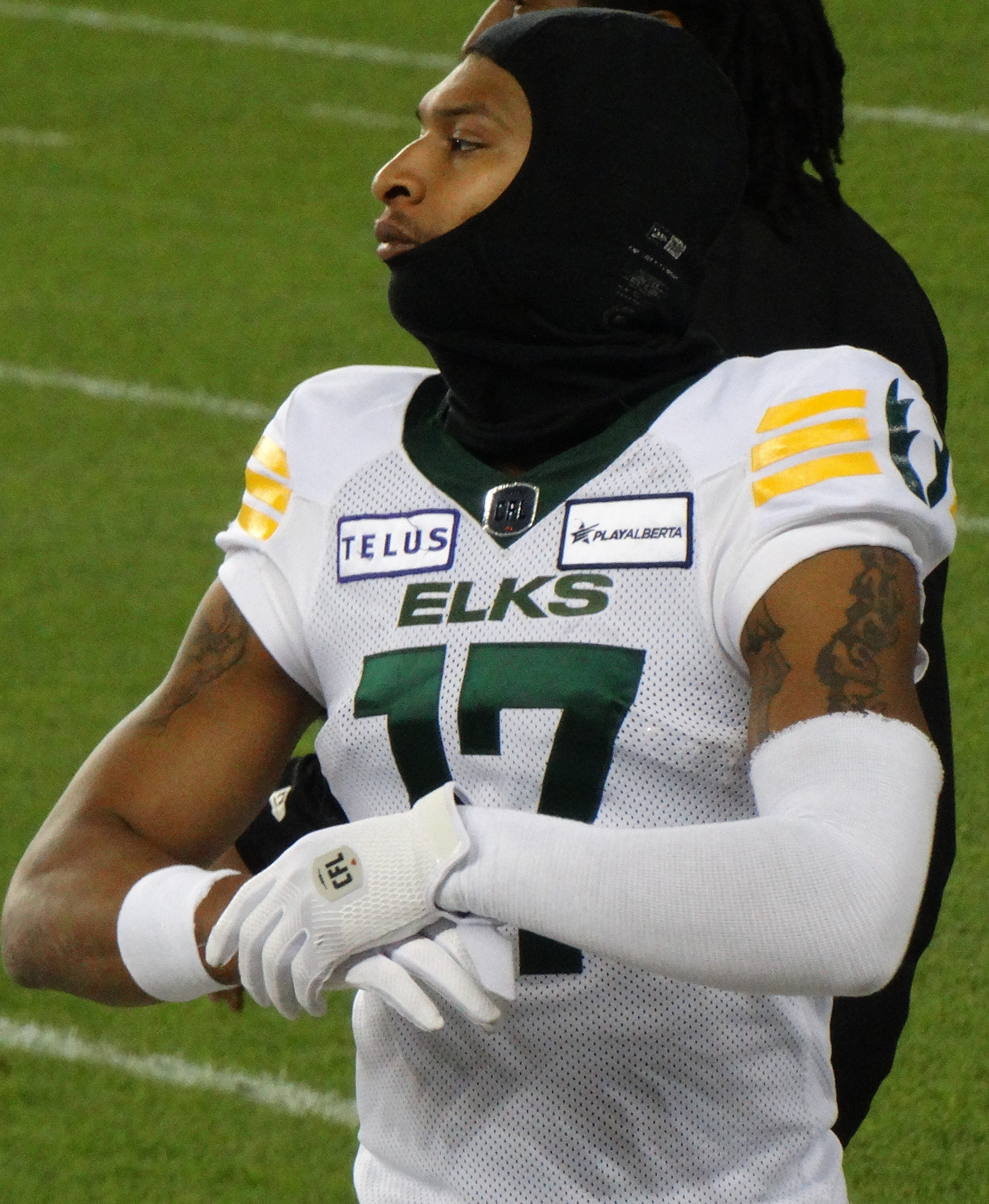
- Mitchell with the Edmonton Elks in 2023

Profile
- Position: Wide receiver

Personal information
- Born: May 16, 1997 (age 29); Memphis, Tennessee, U.S.
- Listed height: 6 ft 1 in (1.85 m)
- Listed weight: 185 lb (84 kg)

Career information
- High school: White Station (Memphis)
- College: Oregon (2016–2018)
- NFL draft: 2019: 7th round, 239th overall pick

Career history
- Minnesota Vikings (2019)*; Edmonton Elks (2022–2024); Winnipeg Blue Bombers (2025)
- * Offseason or practice squad member only

Awards and highlights
- Second-team All-Pac-12 (2018)

Career CFL statistics as of 2025
- Games played: 54
- Receptions: 149
- Receiving yards: 2,089
- Receiving touchdowns: 13
- Stats at CFL.ca
- Stats at Pro Football Reference

Dillon Mitchell (born May 16, 1997) is an American professional football wide receiver. He most recently played for the Winnipeg Blue Bombers of the Canadian Football League (CFL). He played college football at Oregon and was selected by the Minnesota Vikings in the seventh round, 239th overall of the 2019 NFL draft.

== Early life ==
Mitchell attended White Station High School in Memphis, Tennessee. As a junior in 2015, he was named first-team All-State selection and district Offensive Player of the Year and also earned the 2015 Tennessee Titans Mr. Football Class 6A Back of the Year award. In his senior season, he was named Tennessee's Gatorade football player of the year after he caught 81 passes for 1,484 yards and 22 touchdowns, leading the Spartans to a 9–4 record and the Class 6A quarterfinals. He also rushed for 951 yards and 20 more touchdowns on 64 carries. Mitchell also played basketball as a point guard and ran track for the Spartans.

Highly touted as both a basketball and football player, Mitchell committed to the University of Oregon to play college football, picking the Ducks over a list that also included Ole Miss, Mississippi State, Alabama, Auburn, Tennessee and Cincinnati.

== College career ==
As a true freshman at Oregon in 2016, Mitchell played in six games and had two receptions for nine yards. As a sophomore in 2017, he started 12 games and had 42 receptions for 517 yards and four touchdowns. As a junior in 2018, Mitchell set the school record for receiving yards in a season with 1,184 on 75 receptions and 10 touchdowns. He was named the MVP of the 2018 Redbox Bowl. After the season, Mitchell entered the 2019 NFL draft.

== Professional career ==
Pre-draft measurables
| Height | Weight | Arm length | Hand span | Wingspan | 40-yard dash | 10-yard split | 20-yard split | 20-yard shuttle | Three-cone drill | Vertical jump | Broad jump | Bench press |
|---|---|---|---|---|---|---|---|---|---|---|---|---|
| 6 ft 1 1/4 in (1.86 m) | 197 lb (89 kg) | 31 1/2 in (0.80 m) | 9 in (0.23 m) | 6 ft 2 3/8 in (1.89 m) | 4.46 s | 1.53 s | 2.61 s | 4.29 s | 6.93 s | 36.5 in (0.93 m) | 10 ft 2 in (3.10 m) | 12 reps |
All values from NFL Combine/Pro Day

=== Minnesota Vikings ===
Mitchell was drafted in the seventh round (239th overall pick) of the 2019 NFL Draft by the Minnesota Vikings. He was the third Oregon player chosen in the draft and became just the second Ducks receiver drafted in the last 10 years, joining Josh Huff. He was waived on August 31, 2019, and was signed to the practice squad the next day. He signed a reserve/future contract with the Vikings on January 13, 2020, and was waived by the Vikings during final roster cuts on September 5, 2020.

=== Edmonton Elks ===
On July 29, 2022, Mitchell signed with the Edmonton Elks of the Canadian Football League (CFL). Mitchell had a strong rookie season in the CFL, finishing with 35 receptions for 637 yards and four touchdowns. On October 25, 2022, the Elks announced they had agreed on a two-year contract extension with Mitchell through the 2025 season. However, after recording 58 receptions for 727 yards and four touchdowns in 2024, he was released on January 10, 2025.

=== Winnipeg Blue Bombers ===
On January 13, 2025, it was announced that Mitchell had signed with the Winnipeg Blue Bombers. Mitchell became a free agent when his contract expired on February 10, 2026.

== Legal troubles ==
Mitchell was arrested in November 2025 after leading law enforcement on a high-speed chase through Lawrence and Craighead counties in Arkansas.

The incident occurred on November 17, 2025, when Mitchell, driving a black Ford Mustang, was spotted traveling at 80 mph in a 55 mph zone. After a police officer attempted to pull him over, Mitchell fled, sparking a pursuit that reached speeds of up to 130 mph across multiple counties.

The Winnipeg Blue Bombers organization said that, "This morning, we learned of an incident involving Dillon Mitchell that took place last week. The Club is gathering additional information and will not be providing further comment at this time.”
