= Mike Panasiuk =

American football player (born 1997)

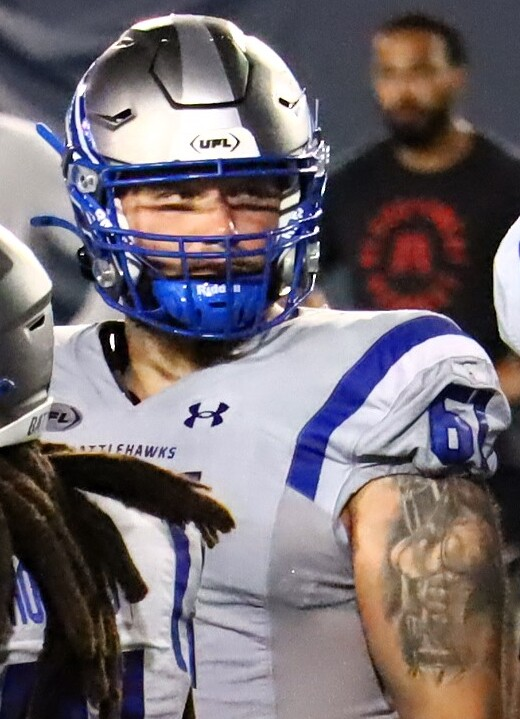
- Panasiuk in 2025

No. 61 – St. Louis Battlehawks
- Position: Center
- Roster status: Active

Personal information
- Born: October 13, 1997 (age 29); Roselle, Illinois, U.S.
- Listed height: 6 ft 4 in (1.93 m)
- Listed weight: 301 lb (137 kg)

Career information
- High school: Lake Park (Roselle, Illinois)
- College: Michigan State (2016–2019)
- NFL draft: 2020: undrafted

Career history
- Las Vegas Raiders (2020)*; Carolina Panthers (2020)*; St. Louis Battlehawks (2023–2024); Indianapolis Colts (2024)*; St. Louis Battlehawks (2025); New Orleans Saints (2025)*; St. Louis Battlehawks (2026–present)
- * Offseason or practice squad member only

Awards and highlights
- 3× All-UFL Team (2024–2026); All-XFL Team (2023); All-Big Ten team (2019); Second-team All-Big Ten (2018); BTN.com All-Freshman Team (2016)
- Stats at Pro Football Reference

Mike Panasiuk (born October 13, 1997) is an American professional football center for the St. Louis Battlehawks of the United Football League (UFL). He played college football for the Michigan State Spartans. Panasiuk has made the transition from defensive to offensive line.

== Early life ==
Panasiuk attended Lake Park High School in Roselle, Illinois.

== College career ==
On June 8, 2015, Panasiuk committed to Michigan State.

Four-year letterwinner finished his career with 100 tackles, including 18 for losses and with four sacks, in 51 games, including 41 starts at defensive tackle. His freshman year in 2016 he played in all 12 games with 14 tackles and was named as an honorable mention selection to the BTN.com All-Freshman Team and also named defensive recipient of MSU's Outstanding Underclass Lineman Award. Sophomore season in 2017, Panasiuk started all 13 games at defensive tackle and finished the season with 25 tackles, including 2.5 for loss. Junior year in 2018, Panasiuk had recorded 6 tackles for loss and 1.5 sacks and had 25 tackles and was named to the Second-team All-Big Ten team and honorable mention All-Big Ten. Senior year in 2019 was named to the All-Big Ten team and got second-team All-Big Ten honors from Pro Football Focus.

== Professional career ==
Pre-draft measurables
Height	Weight
6 ft 3 1/4 in (1.91 m)	300 lb (136 kg)
Values from Pro Day

=== Las Vegas Raiders ===
On April 25, 2020, Panasiuk signed with the Las Vegas Raiders. Panasiuk was released by Las Vegas on September 5.

=== Carolina Panthers ===
On October 21, 2020, Panasiuk signed with the Carolina Panthers practice squad. On November 11, Panasiuk was released from the practice squad. On December 13, 2020, Panasiuk re-signed with the practice squad. On January 14, 2021, Panasiuk signed a reserve/future contract. On August 18, Panasiuk was waived with an injury designation.

=== St. Louis Battlehawks (first stint) ===
For the 2023 season Panasiuk signed with the St. Louis Battlehawks of the XFL. Panasiuk was named to the All-XFL team after the season. On January 26, 2024, Panasiuk signed an agreement to return to the St. Louis Battlehawks. Panasiuk was named to the 2024 All-UFL Team.

=== Indianapolis Colts ===
On August 19, 2024, Panasiuk signed with the Indianapolis Colts. He was waived on August 27.

=== St. Louis Battlehawks (second stint) ===
On December 9, 2024, Panasiuk re-signed with the St. Louis Battlehawks of the United Football League (UFL). He was named to the All-UFL team at the end of the 2025 season. His contract was terminated on August 12, 2025, to sign with an NFL team.

=== New Orleans Saints ===
On August 13, 2025, Panasiuk signed with the New Orleans Saints. He was waived by New Orleans on August 25.

=== St. Louis Battlehawks (third stint) ===
On January 13, 2026, Panasiuk was drafted by the St. Louis Battlehawks.
