= Cody White (wide receiver) =

American football player (born 1998)

No. 82 – Las Vegas Raiders
- Positions: Wide receiver, kickoff returner
- Roster status: Active

Personal information
- Born: November 28, 1998 (age 27); Novi, Michigan, U.S.
- Listed height: 6 ft 3 in (1.91 m)
- Listed weight: 227 lb (103 kg)

Career information
- High school: Walled Lake Western (Walled Lake, Michigan)
- College: Michigan State (2017–2019)
- NFL draft: 2020: undrafted

Career history
- Kansas City Chiefs (2020)*; New York Giants (2020)*; Denver Broncos (2020)*; Pittsburgh Steelers (2020–2022); Seattle Seahawks (2023–2025); Las Vegas Raiders (2026–present)
- * Offseason or practice squad member only

Awards and highlights
- Super Bowl champion (LX)

Career NFL statistics as of Week 10, 2026
- Receptions: 20
- Receiving yards: 303
- Receiving touchdowns: 4
- Stats at Pro Football Reference

Cody White (born November 28, 1998) is an American professional football wide receiver and kickoff returner for the Las Vegas Raiders of the National Football League (NFL). He played college football for the Michigan State Spartans.

== Early life ==
White was born in Oxford, Ohio and grew up in Novi, Michigan and attended Walled Lake Western High School, where he was a member of the baseball, basketball, football, and track teams. As a senior he played the first three games of the season at quarterback due to an injury to the team's starter, passing for 638 yards and nine touchdowns and finished the season with 43 catches for 705 yards and nine touchdowns while also rushing for 576 yards and seven touchdowns and won Michigan's Mr. Football Award. Cody credits his early developmental success to polarizing little league coach, Paul Alati.

== College career ==
White played for the Michigan State Spartans for three seasons. He set a school record for true freshmen with 490 receiving yards on 35 catches and scored four touchdowns. White missed four games due to injury as a sophomore but still led the Spartans with 555 receiving yards on 42 receptions with two touchdown catches. As a junior, White led Michigan State with 66 receptions for 922 yards and six touchdowns. Following the end of the season he announced that he would forgo his senior season to enter the 2020 NFL draft. White finished his collegiate career with 143 catches for 1,967 yards and 12 touchdowns.

== Professional career ==
Pre-draft measurables
Height	Weight	Arm length	Hand span	Wingspan	40-yard dash	10-yard split	20-yard split	20-yard shuttle	Three-cone drill	Vertical jump	Broad jump
6 ft 3 3/8 in (1.91 m)	217 lb (98 kg)	32 1/2 in (0.83 m)	10 in (0.25 m)	6 ft 7 1/4 in (2.01 m)	4.66 s	1.56 s	2.70 s	4.52 s	7.19 s	35.5 in (0.90 m)	10 ft 0 in (3.05 m)
All values from NFL Combine

=== Kansas City Chiefs ===
White signed with the Kansas City Chiefs as an undrafted free agent on April 25, 2020, shortly after the conclusion of the 2020 NFL draft. He was waived by the Chiefs on July 29.

=== New York Giants ===
White was signed by the New York Giants on August 11, 2020. He was waived six days later on August 17.

=== Denver Broncos ===
White was signed by the Denver Broncos on August 23, 2020. He was waived on September 5, during final roster cuts.

=== Pittsburgh Steelers ===
White was signed to the Pittsburgh Steelers' practice squad on September 24, 2020. He remained on the practice squad for the remainder of the 2020 season and signed a reserve/futures contract with the team on January 14, 2021. White was waived on August 31, at the end of training camp but was re-signed to the Steelers' practice squad. He was elevated to the active roster on September 26, for the team's Week 3 game against the Cincinnati Bengals and made his NFL debut in the game, catching two passes for 17 yards in a 24–10 loss. White was signed to the Steelers' active roster on October 9.

On August 30, 2022, White was waived by the Steelers and re-signed to the practice squad the next day. He signed a reserve/future contract with Pittsburgh on January 10, 2023. White was waived/injured on August 21, and then reverted to injured reserve. White was released by Pittsburgh on August 25.

=== Seattle Seahawks ===
On October 18, 2023, the Seattle Seahawks signed White to their practice squad. He was released on October 24, and later re-signed on November 26. White signed a reserve/future contract with Seattle on January 8, 2024.

On August 27, 2024, White was waived by the Seahawks as part of final roster cuts and re-signed to the practice squad the next day. On November 2, White was elevated to the active roster, and played in a Week 9 matchup against the Los Angeles Rams. He recorded two catches for 44 yards, and a blocked punt. White was signed to the active roster on November 16.

On September 11, 2025, White was released by the Seahawks and re-signed to the practice squad. On September 17, White was signed to Seattle's active roster. However, on September 19, White was released by the Seahawks and re-signed to the team's practice squad. White was elevated to Seattle's activate roster ahead of the team's Week 9 matchup against the Washington Commanders. In the game, White scored his first NFL touchdown on a 60-yard reception from Sam Darnold. On November 8, he was signed to the active roster. In 10 total appearances for Seattle, White recorded three receptions for 90 yards and a touchdown. On December 30, White was placed on season-ending injured reserve due to a groin injury suffered in Week 17 against the Carolina Panthers.

On March 18, 2026, White re-signed with the Seahawks. He was released by Seattle on August 30 as a part of final roster cuts.

=== Las Vegas Raiders ===
On September 1, 2026, White was signed to the Las Vegas Raiders' practice squad. He was elevated to the active roster for the season-opening game against the Miami Dolphins, then appeared in a few more games before signing to the active roster on September 29 after scoring three total touchdowns on receptions in games against the Los Angeles Chargers and New Orleans Saints.

=== Regular season statistics ===
Legend
	Won the Super Bowl
**Bold**	Career High

Year	Team	Games		Receiving					Kick returns					Fumbles	
Year	Team	GP	GS	Rec	Yds	Avg	Lng	TD	Ret	Yds	Avg	Lng	TD	Fum	Lost
2022	PIT	**15**	0	5	33	6.6	11	0	0	0	0	0	0	0	0
2023	PIT	1	**1**	1	2	2.0	2	0	0	0	0	0	0	0	0
2024	SEA	4	0	2	44	22.0	28	0	0	0	0	0	0	0	0
2025	SEA	10	0	3	90	**30.0**	**60**	1	**4**	**106**	**26.5**	**36**	0	0	0
2026	LV	10	**1**	**9**	**134**	14.9	28	**3**	0	0	0	0	0	0	0
Career		40	2	20	303	15.2	60	4	4	106	26.5	36	0	0	0

== Personal life ==
White's father, Sheldon White, is a longtime NFL executive and former NFL defensive back who is currently the director of pro scouting for the Pittsburgh Steelers.
