= Elijah Collins =

American gridiron football player (born 2000)

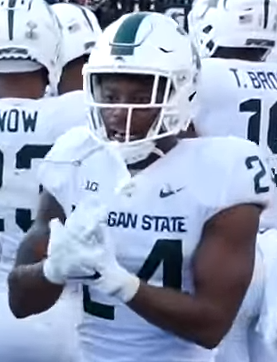
- Collins with Michigan State in 2021

Profile
- Position: Running back

Personal information
- Born: August 1, 2000 (age 26)
- Listed height: 6 ft 0 in (1.83 m)
- Listed weight: 212 lb (96 kg)

Career information
- High school: University of Detroit Jesuit High School and Academy (Detroit, Michigan)
- College: Michigan State (2018–2022); Oklahoma State (2023)
- NFL draft: 2024: undrafted

Career history
- Cincinnati Bengals (2024)*; Ottawa Redblacks (2025–2026)
- * Offseason or practice squad member only

Awards and highlights
- Third-team All-Big Ten (2019)
- Stats at CFL.ca

Elijah Collins (born August 1, 2000) is an American professional football running back. He played college football for the Michigan State Spartans and the Oklahoma State Cowboys.

== Early life ==
Collins attended the University of Detroit Jesuit High School and Academy. As a junior he totaled 19 touchdowns, rushing for 721 yards and hauling in 19 receptions for 306 yards. Coming out of high school, Collins was rated as a three-star recruit and committed to play college football for the Michigan State Spartans.

== College career ==
=== Michigan State ===
As a freshman in 2018, Collins played in three games, rushing twice for eight yards, and took a redshirt. In the 2019 season opener, he rushed eight times for 17 yards in a win over Tulsa. In week 2, Collins got his first career start where he rushed 17 times for 192 yards in a win over Western Michigan. He finished the 2019 season rushing 222 times for 988 yards and five touchdowns. Coming off his strong season in 2019, Collins's role heavily decreased in 2020 with just 41 carries for 90 yards. In 2021, he missed five games due to an injury and rushed just 18 times for 102 yards. In week 5 of the 2022 season, Collins rushed for a team-high 36 yards and a touchdown versus Maryland. He finished the 2022 season rushing for 318 yards and six touchdowns on 70 carries, while also hauling in 14 receptions for 93 yards. After the season, Collins entered his name into the NCAA transfer portal.

=== Oklahoma State ===
Collins transferred to play for the Oklahoma State Cowboys. In his lone season with the Cowboys he rushed just 30 times for 142 yards and two touchdowns.

== Professional career ==
Pre-draft measurables
Height	Weight	Arm length	Hand span	Wingspan	40-yard dash	10-yard split	20-yard split	20-yard shuttle	Three-cone drill	Vertical jump	Broad jump	Bench press
6 ft 0 in (1.83 m)	212 lb (96 kg)	31 3/8 in (0.80 m)	9 7/8 in (0.25 m)	6 ft 3 1/2 in (1.92 m)	4.54 s	1.62 s	2.66 s	4.25 s	7.10 s	38.0 in (0.97 m)	10 ft 5 in (3.18 m)	16 reps
All values from Pro Day

After not being selected in the 2024 NFL draft, Collins signed with the Cincinnati Bengals as an undrafted free agent. He was waived by the Bengals during final roster cuts on August 27, 2024.

=== Ottawa Redblacks ===
On May 9, 2025, it was announced that Collins had signed with the Ottawa Redblacks. At the end of training camp, he was placed on the team's practice roster on May 31, 2025.

On September 24, 2026, Collins was released by the Redblacks.
