= 2021 Michigan State Spartans football team =

American college football season

2021 Michigan State Spartans football

Peach Bowl champion

Peach Bowl, W 31–21 vs. Pittsburgh
- Conference: Big Ten Conference
- East Division

Ranking
- Coaches: No. 8
- AP: No. 9
- Record: 11–2 (7–2 Big Ten)
- Head coach: Mel Tucker (2nd season)
- Offensive coordinator: Jay Johnson (2nd season)
- Offensive scheme: Multiple
- Defensive coordinator: Scottie Hazelton (2nd season)
- Base defense: 4–3
- Home stadium: Spartan Stadium

2021 Big Ten Conference football standings
	Conf.			Overall
Team	W		L	W		L
East Division
No. 3 Michigan xy$^	8	–	1	12	–	2
No. 6 Ohio State x	8	–	1	11	–	2
No. 9 Michigan State	7	–	2	11	–	2
Penn State	4	–	5	7	–	6
Maryland	3	–	6	7	–	6
Rutgers	2	–	7	5	–	8
Indiana	0	–	9	2	–	10
West Division
No. 23 Iowa xy	7	–	2	10	–	4
Minnesota	6	–	3	9	–	4
Wisconsin	6	–	3	9	–	4
Purdue	6	–	3	9	–	4
Illinois	4	–	5	5	–	7
Nebraska	1	–	8	3	–	9
Northwestern	1	–	8	3	–	9
Championship: Michigan 42, Iowa 3
^ – College Football Playoff participant; $ – Conference champion; x – Division champion/co-champions; y – Championship game participant; Rankings from AP Poll

The 2021 Michigan State Spartans football team represented Michigan State University during the 2021 NCAA Division I FBS football season. The Spartans competed as members of the East Division of the Big Ten Conference and played their home games at Spartan Stadium in East Lansing, Michigan. This was the program's second season under head coach Mel Tucker.

The Spartans became bowl-eligible by starting the season 6–0. The team finished the season 11–2, 7–2 in Big Ten play to finish in third place in the East division, and ranked No. 10 in the College Football Playoff rankings. MSU was selected to participate in the Peach Bowl on December 30, the school's first New Year's Six bowl game since 2015. The Spartans defeated Pittsburgh 31–21 in the Peach Bowl.

Running back Kenneth Walker III was a consensus All-American and became the first Spartan to win the Walter Camp and Doak Walker awards. Walker led the Spartans and was second in the country with 1,636 rushing yards. MSU had the nation's worst passing defense, allowing 337.7 yards per game.

On November 24, the school announced that they had signed Tucker to a 10-year, $95 million contract extension, allegedly all through donor money, amid speculations of Tucker being sought after for other college and NFL coaching positions.

== Offseason ==
=== 2021 NFL draft ===
For the first time since 1940, Michigan State failed to have a player drafted in the NFL draft. The 80-year streak was the second longest active streak.

Several players did sign free agent contracts following the draft:

- Shakur Brown, cornerback, Pittsburgh Steelers
- Naquan Jones, defensive tackle, Tennessee Titans

=== Coaching changes ===
On January 27, 2021, safeties coach Mike Tressel, who had been on staff with MSU for 14 years, left the school to take the defensive coordinator position with Cincinnati. On January 28, the school announced that Travares Tillman, who had spent the previous year as a senior defensive assistant, had been promoted to cornerbacks coach.

=== Transfers ===
As a result of the limited season in 2020 due to COVID-19, the NCAA granted a waiver to allow athletes to transfer to another school and be eligible immediately without having to sit out a season. In April 2021, the NCAA further made one-time transfers for all college athletes to be eligible immediately. As a result, transfers were much more common this year than in prior years.

==== Outgoing ====
Name	Pos.	New School
Kalon Gervin	CB	Kansas
Rocky Lombardi	QB	Northern Illinois
Julian Barnett	WR/CB	Memphis
Devontae Dobbs	OL	Memphis
Anthony Williams Jr	RB	Akron
Max Rosenthal	RB/TE	Illinois
Andre Welch	RB/WR	
Jude Pedrozo	LS	
Jeslord Boateng	LB	Akron
Luke Felton	LB	Kentucky
Chris Jackson	CB	Washington State
Tre'Von Morgan	WR	Kentucky
Charles Willekes	LB	
Marcel Lewis	LB	Central Michigan
Davion Williams	CB	Western Kentucky
Javez Alexander	WR	
Domnique Long	S	
Justin Stevens	OL	South Alabama
Jack Olsen	K	Northwestern
Jack Bouwmeester	P	
Damon Kaylor	OL	
Bryce Eimer	LS	
Chris Mayfield	DT	
DeAri Todd	DT	
Tommy Guajardo	TE	
Devin Hightower	LB	Cincinnati
Jasiyah Robinson	LB	

==== Incoming ====
As a result of the change in transfer rules, the Spartans welcomed many new transfers to the program.

Name	Pos.	Former School
Harold Joiner III	RB	Auburn
Jarrett Horst	OL	Arkansas State
Drew Jordan	DE	Duke
Kenneth Walker III	RB	Wake Forest
Kendell Brooks	CB	North Greenville
Chester Kimbrough	CB	Florida
Ben VanSumeran	LB	Michigan
Samih Beydoun	LB	Army
Marqui Lowry Jr.	CB	Louisville
Khary Crump	CB	Arizona
Itayvion Brown	LB	Minnesota
Christian Fitzpatrick	WR	Louisville
Maliq Carr	WR/TE	Purdue
Quavaris Crouch	LB	Tennessee
Ronald Williams	CB	Alabama
Powers Warren	TE	Mississippi State
Cody Waddell	P	Lincoln
Anthony Russo	QB	Temple

=== Recruiting ===
College recruiting (2021)
Name	Hometown	School	Height	Weight	Commit date
Ma'a Gaoteote; LB	Las Vegas, NV	Bishop Gorman	6 ft 2 in (1.88 m)	220 lb (100 kg)	
Ma'a Gaoteote; LB	Recruit ratings: 247Sports:				
Keon Coleman; WR	Opelousas, LA	Opelousas Catholic	6 ft 4 in (1.93 m)	200 lb (91 kg)	
Keon Coleman; WR	Recruit ratings: 247Sports:				
Geno VanDeMark; OL	Montvale, NJ	St. Joseph Regional	6 ft 5 in (1.96 m)	295 lb (134 kg)	
Geno VanDeMark; OL	Recruit ratings: 247Sports:				
Charles Brantley; CB	Venice, FL	Venice	6 ft 0 in (1.83 m)	160 lb (73 kg)	
Charles Brantley; CB	Recruit ratings: 247Sports:				
AJ Kirk; S	Akron, OH	Archbishop Hoban	6 ft 0 in (1.83 m)	200 lb (91 kg)	
AJ Kirk; S	Recruit ratings: 247Sports:				
Ethan Boyd; OT	East Lansing, MI	East Lansing	6 ft 7 in (2.01 m)	285 lb (129 kg)	
Ethan Boyd; OT	Recruit ratings: 247Sports:				
Tyson Watson; DL	Warren, MI	Warren Mott	6 ft 6 in (1.98 m)	270 lb (120 kg)	
Tyson Watson; DL	Recruit ratings: 247Sports:				
Derrick Harmon; DL	Detroit, MI	Loyola	6 ft 4 in (1.93 m)	359 lb (163 kg)	
Derrick Harmon; DL	Recruit ratings: 247Sports:				
Alex Okelo; DL	Nashville, TN	Pearl-Cohn	6 ft 5 in (1.96 m)	217 lb (98 kg)	
Alex Okelo; DL	Recruit ratings: 247Sports:				
Davion Primm; RB	Oak Park, MI	Oak Park	6 ft 0 in (1.83 m)	201 lb (91 kg)	
Davion Primm; RB	Recruit ratings: 247Sports:				
Michael Gravely Jr; S	Euclid, OH	Euclid	6 ft 1 in (1.85 m)	193 lb (88 kg)	
Michael Gravely Jr; S	Recruit ratings: 247Sports:				
Hampton Fry; QB	Fort Worth, TX	All Saints Episcopal	6 ft 5 in (1.96 m)	210 lb (95 kg)	
Hampton Fry; QB	Recruit ratings: 247Sports:				
Antoine Booth; CB	Hyattsville, MD	DeMatha	6 ft 0 in (1.83 m)	185 lb (84 kg)	
Antoine Booth; CB	Recruit ratings: 247Sports:				
Kameron Allen; TE	Forney, TX	North Forney	6 ft 5 in (1.96 m)	220 lb (100 kg)	
Kameron Allen; TE	Recruit ratings: 247Sports:				
Brandon Baldwin; OL	Independence, KS	Independence Community College	6 ft 7 in (2.01 m)	315 lb (143 kg)	
Brandon Baldwin; OL	Recruit ratings: 247Sports:				
Kevin Wigenton; OL	Princeton, NJ	Hun	6 ft 5 in (1.96 m)	290 lb (130 kg)	
Kevin Wigenton; OL	Recruit ratings: 247Sports:				
Carson Casteel; LB	Florence, AL	Florence	6 ft 3 in (1.91 m)	210 lb (95 kg)	
Carson Casteel; LB	Recruit ratings: 247Sports:				
Hank Pepper; LS	Chandler, AZ	Chandler	6 ft 2 in (1.88 m)	200 lb (91 kg)	
Hank Pepper; LS	Recruit ratings: 247Sports:				
Overall recruit ranking:
Note: In many cases, Scout, Rivals, 247Sports, On3, and ESPN may conflict in their listings of height and weight.; In these cases, the average was taken. ESPN grades are on a 100-point scale.; Sources: "Scout". Scout.; "Scout.com Team Recruiting Rankings". Scout.; "2021 Team Ranking". Rivals.com.

== Preseason ==
=== Preseason Big Ten poll ===
Although the Big Ten Conference has not held an official preseason poll since 2010, Cleveland.com has polled sports journalists representing all member schools as a de facto preseason media poll since 2011. For the 2021 poll, Michigan State was projected to finish in last place in the East Division.

== Personnel ==
=== Players ===
2021 Michigan State Spartans football team roster
Players
Coaches
Offense

Pos.	#	Name	Class
WR	0	Keon Coleman	Fr
WR	1	Jayden Reed	Jr
RB	2	Harold Joiner	Jr
WR	3	Terry Lockett Jr	So
QB	5	Hamp Fay	Fr
TE	6	Maliq Carr	Fr
WR	7	Ricky White (injured)	Fr
WR	8	Jalen Nailor	Jr
RB	9	Kenneth Walker III	Jr
QB	10	Payton Thorne	So
RB	11	Connor Heyward	Sr
WR	13	Sebastian Brown	Fr
QB	14	Noah Kim	Fr
QB	15	Anthony Russo (injured)	GS
WR	17	Tre Mosley	So
QB	18	Andrew Schorfhaar	Fr
QB	19	Zach Gillespie	Fr
RB	21	Davion Primm	Fr
RB	22	Jordon Simmons	So
RB	24	Elijah Collins	Jr
WR	25	Joseph Martinez	Fr
TE	40	Powers Warren	Sr
WR	42	Nick Hunter	So
TE	44	Adam Berghorst	Jr
TE	47	Jackson Morse	So
OT	53	Brandon Baldwin	So
G	56	Matt Carrick	Sr
OL	58	Spencer Brown	So
C	59	Nick Samac	Jr
OL	62	Luke Campbell	GS
C	64	Matt Allen	GS
OL	67	JD Duplain	Jr
OT	68	Dan VanOpstall	Jr
OL	69	Blake Bueter	Sr
OL	70	Kevin Wigenton	Fr
G	71	James Ohonba	Jr
OL	72	Dallas Fincher	Fr
OL	73	Jacob Isiaia	Jr
OL	74	Geno VanDeMark	Fr
G	75	Kevin Jarvis	Sr
OT	76	A. J. Arcuri	GS
OL	77	Ethan Boyd	Fr
OT	79	Jarrett Horst	Sr
TE	81	Parks Gissinger	Jr
TE	82	Kameron Allen	Fr
WR	83	Montorie Foster	So
WR	85	Cade McDonald	So
WR	86	Aubrey Dawkins	Fr
WR	87	Jahz Watts	Sr
TE	88	Trenton Gillison	Jr
TE	92	Evan Morris	So
TE	97	Tyler Hunt	Sr

Defense

Pos.	#	Name	Class
CB	0	Charles Brantley	Fr
CB	1	Ronald Williams	Sr
DE	2	Drew Jordan	GS
S	3	Xavier Henderson	Sr
S	4	CJ Hayes	GS
DE	5	Michael Fletcher	So
LB	6	Quavaris Crouch	Jr
S	7	Michael Dowell	Jr
DT	8	Simeon Barrow	Fr
CB	9	Marqui Lowery	Fr
LB	10	Ma'a Gaotetote	Fr
CB	11	Antoine Booth	Fr
CB	12	Chester Kimbrough	Jr
LB	13	Ben VanSumeren	Jr
CB	14	Khary Crump	Fr
S	15	Angelo Grose	So
CB	18	Kalon Gervin	Jr
LB	19	Itayvion Brown	Fr
CB	20	Emmanuel Flowers	GS
LB	21	Chase Kline	Jr
CB	22	Justin White	So
S	23	Darius Snow	So
DB	24	Michael Gravely	Fr
LB	25	Cole DeMarzo	Fr
EDGE	26	Brandon Wright	Jr
LB	27	Cal Haladay	Fr
S	28	Tate Hallock	So
S	29	AJ Kirk	Fr
S	31	Kobe Meyers	Fr
DB	32	Zach Denha	Fr
CB	33	Kendell Brooks	Jr
S	34	Khalil Majeed	Fr
LB	35	Sam Edwards	Fr
DB	36	Torell Williams	So
CB	38	Spencer Rowland	GS
DT	41	Derrick Harmon	Fr
LB	42	Carson Casteel (injured)	Fr
LB	44	Samih Beydoun	So
LB	45	Noah Harvey	Sr
DE	47	Jeff Pietrowski	So
DT	50	Tyson Watson	Fr
DT	54	Kyle King	Fr
DE	55	Zach Slade	Jr
DT	57	Evan Brunning	So
DT	64	Jacob Slade	Jr
DE	86	Drew Beesley	GS
DE	91	Jack Camper	Sr
DE	93	Alex Okelo	Fr
DR	94	Dashaun Mallory	Jr
DE	96	Jacub Panasiuk	Sr
DT	97	Maverick Hansen	So
DE	98	Avery Dunn	Fr
DT	99	Jalen Hunt	So

Special teams

Pos.	#	Name	Class
K	4	Matt Coghlin	GS
LS	31	Hank Pepper	Fr
K	39	Evan Johnson	Jr
P	43	Cody Waddell	GS
LS	92	Michael Donovan	Fr
K	98	Stephan Rusnak	Fr
P	99	Bryce Baringer	Sr

Head coach

- Mel Tucker

Coordinators/assistant coaches

- Chris Kapilovic (assistant head coach/offensive line/run game coordinator)
- Scottie Hazelton (defensive coordinator)
- Jay Johnson (offensive coordinator/quarterbacks)
- Harlon Barnett (Secondary)
- Ron Burton (defensive line)
- Ross Els (special teams coordinator/linebackers)
- Ted Gilmore (tight ends)
- Courtney Hawkins (wide receivers)
- William Peagler (running backs)
- Travares Tillman (cornerbacks)

Legend

- (C) Team captain
- (S) Suspended
- (I) Ineligible
- Injured
- Redshirt

Roster
Last update: November 1, 2021

=== Coaching staff ===
Name	Position	Season
Mel Tucker	Head coach	2nd
Chris Kapilovic	Assistant head coach/offensive line/run game coordinator	2nd
Jay Johnson	Offensive coordinator/quarterbacks	2nd
Scottie Hazelton	Defensive coordinator	2nd
Ted Gilmore	Tight ends	2nd
Courtney Hawkins	Wide receivers	2nd
William Pegler	Running backs	2nd
Ron Burton	Defensive line	8th
Harlon Barnett	Secondary	13th
Ross Els	Special Teams/linebackers coach	2nd
Travares Tillman	Cornerbacks	1st

== Schedule ==
Date	Time	Opponent	Rank	Site	TV	Result	Attendance
September 3	9:00 p.m.	at Northwestern		Ryan Field; Evanston, IL	ESPN	W 38–21	34,248
September 11	12:00 p.m.	Youngstown State*		Spartan Stadium; East Lansing, MI	BTN	W 42–14	70,103
September 18	12:00 p.m.	at No. 24 Miami (FL)*		Hard Rock Stadium; Miami Gardens, FL	ABC	W 38–17	46,427
September 25	7:00 p.m.	Nebraska	No. 20	Spartan Stadium; East Lansing, MI	FS1	W 23–20 ^{OT}	70,332
October 2	7:30 p.m.	Western Kentucky*^{†}	No. 17	Spartan Stadium; East Lansing, MI	BTN	W 48–31	70,075
October 9	12:00 p.m.	at Rutgers	No. 11	SHI Stadium; Piscataway, NJ	BTN	W 31–13	41,117
October 16	12:00 p.m.	at Indiana	No. 10	Memorial Stadium; Bloomington, IN (Old Brass Spittoon)	FS1	W 20–15	50,571
October 30	12:00 p.m.	No. 6 Michigan	No. 8	Spartan Stadium; East Lansing, MI (Paul Bunyan Trophy, College GameDay, Big Noon Kickoff)	FOX	W 37–33	76,549
November 6	3:30 p.m.	at Purdue	No. 3	Ross–Ade Stadium; West Lafayette, IN	ABC	L 29–40	57,748
November 13	4:00 p.m.	Maryland	No. 7	Spartan Stadium; East Lansing, MI	FOX	W 40–21	67,437
November 20	12:00 p.m.	at No. 4 Ohio State	No. 7	Ohio Stadium; Columbus, OH (College GameDay)	ABC	L 7–56	101,858
November 27	3:30 p.m.	Penn State	No. 12	Spartan Stadium; East Lansing, MI (Land Grant Trophy)	ABC	W 30–27	66,312
December 30	7:00 p.m.	vs. No. 12 Pittsburgh*	No. 10	Mercedes-Benz Stadium; Atlanta, GA (Peach Bowl)	ESPN	W 31–21	41,230
*Non-conference game; ^{†}Homecoming; Rankings from AP Poll (and CFP Rankings, after November 2) - Released prior to game; All times are in Eastern time

== Rankings ==
Ranking movements Legend: ██ Increase in ranking ██ Decrease in ranking — = Not ranked RV = Received votes т = Tied with team above or below
	Week															
Poll	Pre	1	2	3	4	5	6	7	8	9	10	11	12	13	14	Final
AP	—	RV	RV	20	17	11	10	9	8	5	8	7	12	11	11	9
Coaches	—	RV	RV	21	16-T	11	9	7	7	6	9	8	13	13	10	8
CFP	Not released									3	7	7	12	11	10	Not released

== Awards and honors ==
=== Mel Tucker ===
Mel Tucker was named the conference's Hayes-Schembechler Coach of the Year (coaches vote) and Dave McClain Coach of the Year (media vote). Tucker was also named Region 3 coach of the year by the American Football Coaches Association.

=== Kenneth Walker III ===
Running back Kenneth Walker III was named the winner Walter Camp Award as the college football player of the year as decided by a group of coaches and sports information directors. He was also named the winner of the Doak Walker Award as the nation's top running back. Walker became the first player to win the Camp Award while not being named a finalist for the Heisman Trophy. Walker is the only player to win either award in Michigan State history.

Walker received the award for Running Back of the Year and All-Big Ten first team (coaches and media).

=== Other awards ===
Wide receiver Jayden Reed was named to the All-Big Ten third team (coaches and media).

Defensive lineman Jacub Panasiuk was named to the All-Big Ten second team (coaches and media). Safety Xavier Henderson was named to the media third team. Punter Bryce Baringer was second team special teams (coaches and media) and Jayden Reed was named to the second team for a return specialist (coaches and media).

== Game summaries ==
=== Northwestern ===
Week One: Michigan State at Northwestern – Game summary

Quarter	1	2	3	4	Total
Michigan State	14	7	7	10	38
Northwestern	0	7	0	14	21

at Ryan Field • Evanston, IL

- Date: September 3, 2021
- Game time: 9:15 p.m.
- Game weather: 70°F, Wind: 13 mph N, Cloudy
- Game attendance: 34,248
- Referee: Michael Cannon
- TV announcers (ESPN): Beth Mowins (play-by-play), Kirk Morrison (analyst), Dawn Davenport (sideline)

Game information

First Quarter

- (14:47) MSU TD: Kenneth Walker III 75-yard run (Matt Coghlin kick)
  MSU 7–0; 1 plays, 75 yards, 0:13
- (07:44) MSU TD: Kenneth Walker III 3-yard run (Matt Coghlin kick)
  MSU 14–0; 10 plays, 74 yards, 4:12

Second Quarter

- (09:45) MSU TD: Jordon Simmons 14-yard pass from Payton Thorne (Matt Coghlin kick)
  MSU 21–0; 4 plays, 66 yards, 1:28
- (00:59) NU TD: Trey Pugh 1-yard pass from Hunter Johnson (Charlie Kuhbander kick)
  MSU 21–7; 15 plays, 62 yards, 6:44

Third Quarter

- (06:30) MSU TD: Kenneth Walker III 5-yard run (Matt Coghlin kick)
  MSU 28–7; 11 plays, 80 yards, 4:20

Fourth Quarter

- (11:17) NU TD: Trey Pugh 5-yard pass from Hunter Johnson (Charlie Kuhbander kick)
  MSU 28–14; 16 plays, 69 yards, 7:52
- (06:04) MSU FG: Matt Coghlan 37-yard field goal
  MSU 31–14; 10 plays, 59 yards, 5:06
- (02:27) NU TD: Stephon Robinson, Jr. 14-yard pass from Hunter Johnson (Charlie Kuhbander kick)
  MSU 31–21; 8 plays, 61 yards, TOP 2:20
- (01:29) MSU TD: Kenneth Walker III 6-yard run (Matt Coghlin kick)
  MSU 38–21; 5 plays, 52 yards, TOP 0:57

Passing

- MSU – Payton Thorne: 15/25, 185 yards, 1 TD
- NU – Hunter Johnson: 30/43, 283 yards, 3 TD

Rushing

- MSU – Kenneth Walker III: 23 carries, 264 yards, 4 TD
- NU – Evan Hull: 9 carries, 87 yards

Receiving

- MSU – Jayden Reed: 5 receptions, 64 yards
- NU – Bryce Kirtz: 7 receptions, 80 yards

In the first game of the season, the Spartans visited Northwestern, one of only two teams MSU beat in the shortened 2020 season. MSU did not name a starting quarterback until shortly before the start of the game when head coach Mel Tucker announced Payton Thorne would start the game.

Transfer running back Kenneth Walker III made a big impact for the Spartans, scoring on the first offensive play, a 75-yard touchdown run to give MSU an early 7–0 lead. Northwestern responded by moving into Spartan territory, but a missed field goal that gave the Spartans the ball on their own 26 yard line. Walker scored his second touchdown of the game 10 plays later from three yards out to push MSU's lead to 14–0 with more than seven minutes remaining in the first quarter. The Wildcats again moved into Spartan territory, but on fourth down and seven, they passed up a field goal opportunity. The fourth down pass was incomplete and MSU again took over possession. Each team then punted twice before MSU took over on their own 34. Five plays later, Thorne hit Jordon Simmons on a short pass that Simmons took 14 yards for the Spartans' third touchdown of the game. The teams exchanged punts again, but the Wildcats got on the board when NU quarterback Hunter Johnson hit Trey Pugh for a one-yard touchdown pass with less than a minute left to play in the half. MSU took the ball down the field, but was forced to attempt a 60-yard field goal which fell well short and teams went to the half with MSU leading 21–7.

In the third quarter, Northwestern again moved into MSU territory, but again missed a field goal. MSU took over and moved the ball to the Wildcat five-yard line where Walker scored his third touchdown of the game extending the Spartans lead to 28–7. Northwestern was able to add a touchdown early in the fourth quarter, but MSU added a Matt Coghlan 37-yard field goal to make the score 31–14. Following a punt by Northwestern, MSU turned the ball over on a Harold Joiner fumble giving Northwestern the ball at their own 37. NU capitalized, scoring a touchdown on a Stephon Robinson Jr. 14-yard catch from Johnson to narrow MSU's lead to 10 with less than three minutes remaining in the game. However, Walker scored his fourth touchdown of the game on a six-yard run to push MSU's lead to 17, 38–21. Northwestern could manage nothing further as MSU won the game easily.

Walker, who scored four touchdowns in the game, eclipsed the total touchdown runs by Spartan running backs the prior season (0) on his first run of the game and ran for more yards in the game (264) than any Spartan did all of the prior season. It was the most rushing touchdowns scored in a game by a player for the Spartans since 2010 and first time since 2012 that a Spartan ran for more than 200 yards in a game. Thorne played well, not turning the ball over and completing 60% of his passes.

The win moved MSU to 1–0 on the season.

=== Youngstown State ===
Week Two: Youngstown State at Michigan State – Game summary

Quarter	1	2	3	4	Total
Youngstown State	0	7	7	0	14
Michigan State	14	21	7	0	42

at Spartan Stadium • East Lansing, MI

- Date: September 11, 2021
- Game time: 12:01 p.m.
- Game weather: 75°F, Wind: 7 mph N, Sunny
- Game attendance: 70,103
- Referee: Kole Kunueppel
- TV announcers (BTN): Lisa Byington (play-by-play), Anthony Herron (analyst), Coley Harvey (sideline)
- Sources

Game information

First Quarter

- (14:50) MSU TD: Jayden Reed 75-yard pass from Payton Thorne (Matt Coghlin kick)
  MSU 7–0; 1 plays, 75 yards, 0:10
- (07:54) MSU TD: Payton Thorne 10-yard run (Matt Coghlin kick)
  MSU 14–0; 6 plays, 58 yard, 2:01

Second Quarter

- (12:52) MSU TD: Jayden Reed 85-yard pass from Payton Thorne (Matt Coghlin kick)
  MSU 21–0; 3 plays, 98 yards, 1:07
- (10:12) MSU TD: Elijah Collins 20-yard pass from Payton Thorne (Matt Coghlin kick)
  MSU 28–-0; 4 plays, 52 yards 1:51
- (04:10) YSU TD: Demeatric Crenshaw 6-yard run (Colt McFadden kick)
  MSU 28–7; 12 plays, 75 yards, 6:02
- (00:17) MSU TD: Kenneth Walker III 6-yard run (Matt Coghlin kick)
  MSU 35–7; 11 plays, 68 yards, 3:47

Third Quarter

- (10:54) YSU TD: Christian Turner 26-yard run (Colt McFadden kick)
  MSU 35–14; 10 plays, 75 yards, 4:06
- (04:32) MSU TD: Jalen Nailor 16-yard pass from Payton Thorne (Matt Coghlin kick)
  MSU 42–14; 6 plays, 45 yards, 2:07

Passing

- YSU – Demeatric Crenshaw: 10/23, 81 yards, 1 INT
- MSU – Payton Thorne: 15/21, 280 yards, 4 TD

Rushing

- YSU – Demeatric Crenshaw: 18 carries, 78 yards, 1 TD
- MSU – Jordon Simmons: 16 carries, 123 yards

Receiving

- YSU – Luke Hensley, 4 receptions, 35 yards
- MSU – Jayden Reed: 4 receptions, 181 yards, 2 TD

MSU returned home to face Youngstown State for their first home game with fans since November 30, 2019.

MSU again started well, scoring on the first play from scrimmage for the second consecutive game as Payton Thorne threw a 75-yard touchdown pass to Jayden Reed on a flea flicker. The Penguins went three-and-out on their first possession and MSU also punted on their next possession. YSU failed to gain a first down again on their next possession and MSU moved down the field quickly scoring on a Thorne 10-yard run to move MSU's lead to 14–0. YSU moved to midfield, but was forced to punt on a third down sack by MSU's Jeff Pietrowski. After two first downs, MSU's next drive stalled and they were forced to punt from their own 47. The Penguins blocked the ensuing punt and took over at the Spartan 46-yard line. YSU moved to MSU's 29 before Xavier Henderson made a spectacular one-handed interception at the MSU two-yard line to give the Spartans the ball back. Three plays later Thorne hit Reed again on an 85-yard touchdown pass to give MSU a 21-point lead. Following a three-and-out for Youngstown State, MSU pushed the lead to 28–0 on an Elijah Collins 10-yard screen pass from Thorne. YSU answered on their next possession, scoring on a quarterback run of six yards to return the lead to 21 points. With just over four minutes remaining in the half, the Spartans moved the ball down the field quickly and scored on a Walker six-yard touchdown run to give MSU a 35–7 lead at the half.

In the second half, YSU took the opening kickoff and moved down the field, scoring on a 26-yard touchdown run to make the score 35–14. MSU missed a 50-yard field goal attempt on the next possession, but YSU went three-and-out on their second possession of the half. The Spartans scored again with less than five minutes remaining in the third quarter when Thorne hit Jalen Nailor for a 16-yard touchdown. With a 42–14 lead, MSU began to substitute heavily and Anthony Russo replaced Thorne at quarterback. MSU threatened to score again early in the fourth quarter, but Russo fumbled the ball on a run at the YSU one-yard line, giving the Penguins the ball with five minutes remaining. YSU would hold the ball for the remainder of the game, but could not score as MSU won easily 42–14.

Thorne threw for four touchdowns in the less than three quarters of action. Walker, who had four touchdowns on 23 carries against Northwestern, shared the load, only carrying the ball seven times, but notched 58 yards and touchdown. Jordon Simmons took the bulk of the rushes for MSU, carrying the ball 16 times for 123 yards. MSU put up 275 yards rushing and over 300 yards through the air in the blowout.

The win moved MSU to 2–0 on the season.

=== Miami ===
Week Three: Michigan State at No. 24 Miami – Game summary

Quarter	1	2	3	4	Total
Michigan State	0	10	7	21	38
No. 24 Miami	0	7	7	3	17

at Hard Rock Stadium • Miami Gardens, FL

- Date: September 18, 2021
- Game time: 12:07 p.m.
- Game weather: 87°F, Wind: 5 mph NW, Cloudy
- Game attendance: 46,427
- Referee: Jerry McGinn
- TV announcers (ABC): Joe Tessitore (play-by-play), Greg McElroy (analyst), Katie George (sideline)
- Sources

Game information

Second Quarter

- (13:58) MSU FG: Matt Coghlin 23-yard field goal
  MSU 3–0; 12 plays, 73 yards, 4:41
- (10:08) MIA TD: Charleston Rambo 3-yard pass from D'Eriq King (Andres Borregales kick)
  MIA 7–3; 10 plays 75 yards, 3:50
- (02:56) MSU TD: Kenneth Walker III 7-yard pass from Payton Thorne (Matt Coghlin kick)
  MSU 10–7; 9 plays, 80 yards, 3:14

Third Quarter

- (06:08) MSU TD: Jalen Nailor 11-yard pass from Payton Thorne (Matt Coghlin kick)
  MSU 17–7; 10 plays, 85 yards, 3:59
- (03:53) MIA TD: Charleston Rambo 14-yard pass from D'Eriq King (Andres Borregales kick)
  MSU 17–14; 10 plays, 75 yards, 02:15

Fourth Quarter

- (13:10) MSU TD: Jayden Reed 10-yard pass from Payton Thorne (Matt Coghlin kick)
  MSU 24–14; 3 plays, 13 yards, 1;27
- (08:11) MIA FG: Andres Borregales 55-yard field goal
  MSU 24–17; 11 plays, 38 yards, 4:59
- (04:12) MSU TD: Jalen Nailor 39-yard pass from Payton Thorne (Matt Coghlin kick)
  MSU 31–17; 8 plays, 75 yards, 3:59
- (02:32) MSU TD: Jayden Reed 8-yard run (Matt Coghlin kick)
  MSU 38–17; 4 plays, 23 yards, 2:33

Passing

- MSU – Payton Thorne: 18/31, 261 yards, 4 TD
- MIA – D'Eriq King: 38/59, 388 yards, 2 TD, 2 INT

Rushing

- MSU – Kenneth Walker III: 27 carries, 182 yards
- MIA – Cam'Ron Harris: 11 carries, 44 yards

Receiving

- MSU – Jalen Nailor: 4 receptions, 82 yards, 2 TD
- MIA – Charleston Rambo: 12 receptions, 156 yards, 2 TD

The Spartans next traveled to face No. 24-ranked Miami at Hard Rock Stadium. The meeting was only the fifth all-time between the schools with MSU failing to win any of the four prior games.

For the first time on the season, the Spartans did not get the ball first and did not score on the first play from scrimmage in the game. Instead, Miami moved the ball well, moving into Spartan territory, before quarterback D'Eriq King was stripped by Pietrowski and MSU recovered at their own 29. It was Pietrowski's second forced fumble on the season. The Spartans got a first down, but nothing more and were forced to punt the ball on the ensuing possession. Pinned inside the one-yard line by the Spartan punt, Miami moved to their own 19 before being forced to punt the ball back to the Spartans. MSU lost yardage on the next possession and went three-and-out. Following a punt by Miami, the Spartans moved into Miami territory to start the second quarter. Walker moved the ball to the Miami six, but the Spartans could get no closer and settled for a Coghlin field goal to take the 3–0 lead. Miami responded, moving the ball to the MSU three-yard line. On fourth down, the Hurricanes chose to go for it and King hit wide receiver Charleston Rambo for a touchdown to give Miami and 7–3 lead. On the ensuing possession, Thorne hit Tre Mosley on a 51-yard pass to move to the Miami 24-yard line. However, the MSU offense sputtered from there and settled for a Coghlin field goal attempt that missed left leaving the score at 7–3. Miami respond again, moving into MSU territory, but they also were forced to attempt field goal that was also no good. Taking over at their own 20, MSU turned to Walker, as he rushed three times for 42 yards to move the ball into Hurricane territory. Thorne then hit Walker o a seven-yard touchdown catch and run to give MSU the 10–7 lead with just under three minutes remaining in the half. MSU intercepted King on the next possession give the Spartans the ball back with 1:29 remaining. MSU could not take advantage of the turnover and was forced to punt. The Hurricanes were unable to muster anything and the half ended with MSU leading 10–7.

In the second half, the teams exchanged punts before MSU was able to move into Miami territory again on the strength of Walker's legs. Thorne then hit Nailor for an 11-yard touchdown pass to put MSU up 17–7. Miami quickly responded as King hit Rambo again for a touchdown pass to narrow the lead to three again. Following a punt by MSU, King was sacked and fumbled the ball on the second play of the fourth quarter. Jacub Panasiuk recovered the fumble forced by Drew Beesly and MSU took over at the Miami 17. Three plays later, Thorne hit Reed for a 10-yard touchdown pass putting MSU up 24–14. The Hurricanes responded with a field goal to narrow the lead to seven at 24–17. Thorne then hit Nailor again, this time from 39 yards out for a touchdown to push MSU's lead to 14. On the first play of the ensuing possession, King was intercepted again, this time by Ronald Williams Jr. MSU took over on the Miami 23 with just over four minutes remaining. Two rushes by Walker put MSU at the Miami three. An end around to Reed from eight yards out put the game out of reach as the lead ballooned to 38–17. Miami failed to score on their next possession as the clock ran out and MSU won 38–17.

Walker again dominated for the Spartans, rushing for 182 yards and scoring on a touchdown reception. Thorne also played well, throwing four touchdown passes for the second consecutive game. The Spartan defense forced four turnovers in the game despite allowing 440 yards in the win. After not scoring more than 30 points in any game in 2020, the Spartans scored more than 30 points for the third consecutive game.

The win moved MSU to 3–0 on season.

=== Nebraska ===
Week Four: Nebraska at No. 20 Michigan State – Game summary

Quarter	1	2	3	4	OT	Total
Nebraska	0	10	3	7	0	20
No. 20 Michigan State	0	13	0	7	3	23

at Spartan Stadium • East Lansing, MI

- Date: September 25, 2021
- Game time: 7:10 p.m.
- Game weather: 60°F, Wind: 6 mph SW, Sunny
- Game attendance: 70,332
- Referee: Jeffrey Servinski
- TV announcers (FS1): Cory Provus (play-by-play), Mark Helfrich (analyst)
- Source

Game information

Second Quarter

- (14:08) MSU TD: Jayden Reed 35-yard pass from Payton Thorne (Matt Coghlin kick)
  MSU 7–0; 3 plays, 55 yards, 0:52
- (11:22) NEB FG: Connor Culp 28-yard field goal
  MSU 7–3; 7 plays, 65 yards, 2:46
- (08:20) MSU FG: Matt Coghlin 26-yard field goal
  MSU 10–3; 6 plays, 49 yards, 2:54
- (04:20) NEB TD: Adrian Martinez 12-yard run (Connor Culp kick)
  Tied 10–10; 9 plays, 75 yards, 4:00
- (01:03) MSU FG: Matt Coghlin 27-yard field goal
  MSU 13–10; 9 plays, 61 yards, 3:11

Third Quarter

- (09:10) NEB FG: Connor Culp 28-yard field goal
  Tied 13–13; 14 plays, 60 yards, 5:50

Fourth Quarter

- (7:29) NEB TD: Adrian Martinez 3-yard run (Connor Culp kick)
  NEB 20–13; 11 plays, 80 yards, 5:05
- (3:47) MSU TD: Jayden Reed 62-yard punt return (Matt Coghlin kick)
  Tied 20–20

Overtime

- (00:00) MSU FG: Matt Coghlin 21-yard field goal
  MSU 23–20; 4 plays 22 yards

Passing

- NEB – Adrian Martinez: 24/34, 244 yards, 1 INT
- MSU – Payton Thorne: 14/23, 183 yards, 1 TD, 1 INT

Rushing

- NEB – Rahmir Johnson: 19 carries, 78 yards
- MSU – Kenneth Walker III: 19 carries, 74 yards

Receiving

- NEB – Zavier Betts: 5 receptions, 62 yards
- MSU – Tre Mosley: 6 receptions, 70 yards

The newly ranked Spartans (No. 20 AP, No. 21 Coaches) returned home to face Nebraska for a night game at Spartan Stadium.

The Spartans took the first possession of the game to their 39 before Thorne threw his first interception of the season on a long throw to the Nebraska 18-yard line. A poor punt following the Cornhuskers first possession gave MSU the ball at their own 44-yard line. The Spartans moved into Nebraska territory and were faced with a fourth and one before Thorne was sacked on the fourth down play to give the ball back to the Cornhuskers. Nebraska moved to midfield on their next possession but were again forced to punt. The teams then exchanged punts to end the first quarter with no score. On the first possession of the second quarter, Thorne hit Reed on a flea flicker for a 35-yard touchdown pass to give the Spartans a 7–0 lead. Nebraska responded by moving deep into Spartan territory, but the MSU defense stopped them at the Spartan 10 forcing a field goal to narrow the lead to 7–3.Aa 41-yard kickoff return from Reed put MSU at the 43 on their next possession. A 35-yard pass completion to Mosley moved MSU into Nebraska territory, but the drive sputtered inside the 10 and the Spartans settled for a field goal to return their lead to 10. Nebraska answered on the ensuing possession, moving into Spartan territory and scoring on a 12-yard Adrian Martinez run to tie the game at 10. With just over four minutes remaining in the half, MSU again moved into Cornhusker territory, but again were stopped inside the 10 and settled for a field goal to take 13–10 lead. With just over a minute remaining in the half, the Spartans forced Nebraska to punt. William Pryzstup, the Cornhuskers' punter, who had issues with earlier punts, shanked a punt that netted only seven yards giving the Spartans the ball at the Nebraska 46 with 16 seconds remaining. The Spartans were able to move to the Nebraska 27 to set up for another field goal. A poor snap led to the field goal being blocked as the half ended with MSU leading 13–10.

On the first drive of the second half, the Cornhuskers moved to the MSU 10, but settled for a field goal to tie the game at 10. Back-to-back punts gave the Huskers the ball at their own 31 and they moved to midfield as the quarter ended. On the second play of the fourth quarter, Martinez fumbled and the Spartans recovered at the Nebraska 45. After having the ball for only one possession in the third quarter, the Spartans quickly gave the ball up as they lost yardage on the drive and were forced to punt. Martinez then scored from three yards out with just over seven minutes remaining to give Nebraska a 20–13 lead. MSU again lost yards on their quick three-and-out possession. The Spartans were able to force Nebraska to punt on their next possession. The Cornhuskers, who had replaced Prystup at punter after his poor first half performance, again made an error on the punt. MSU used two returners and Reed caught the punt as most Nebraska players were focused on the other returner on the left side for the field. As a result, Reed was able to return the punt 62 yards for a touchdown to tie the game at 20 with under four minutes remaining the half. MSU's defense forced another punt, but the offense continued its second-half struggles as it failed to gain any yards. Nebraska took over with 47 seconds remaining, but could not do anything as the half expired.

In overtime, the Spartans won the toss and elected to go on defense. On third down, MSU defensive back Chester Kimbrough jumped a Martinez pass to intercept the ball and return it most of the waydown the field, but was unable to score as he was tackled at the Nebraska two-yard line. On the MSU overtime possession, Walker, who had a fairly quiet game, took the first handoff to the Nebraska three-yard line. Two Walker rushes later and MSU brought out the field goal unit. Coghlin's 21-yard field goal gave the Spartans the 23–20 overtime win.

The Spartan offense struggled mightily in the game, managing only 14 yards in the second half. A major difference in the game was MSU's punter, Bryce Baringer, who averaged over 58 yards per kick while the Nebraska punters averaged under 33 yards. Walker ran for 74 yards in the game while Thorne threw his first interception on the season. MSU only converted one third down in the game, but still managed to pull out the win.

The win moved MSU to 4–0 on the season.

=== Western Kentucky ===
Week Five: Western Kentucky at No. 17 Michigan State – Game summary

Quarter	1	2	3	4	Total
Western Kentucky	10	6	0	15	31
No. 17 Michigan State	21	21	3	3	48

at Spartan Stadium • East Lansing, MI

- Date: October 2, 2021
- Game time: 7:40 p.m.
- Game weather: 66°F, Wind: 6 mph S, Cloudy
- Game attendance: 70,075
- Referee: Mark Kluczynski
- TV announcers (BTN): Joe Beninati (play-by-play), J Leman (analyst)
- Source

Game information

First Quarter

- (13:32) MSU TD: Jayden Reed 88-yard punt return (Matt Coghlin kick)
  MSU 7–0
- (08:26) MSU TD: Kenneth Walker III 6-yard run (Matt Coghlin kick)
  MSU 14–0; 7 plays, 80 yards, 3:59
- (05:04) WKU FG: Brayden Narveson 37-yard field goal
  MSU 14–3; 11 plays, 56 yards, 3:22
- (03:54) MSU TD: Jayden Reed 46-yard pass from Payton Thorne (Matt Coghlin kick)
  MSU 21–3; 4 plays, 75 yards, 3:22
- (02:57) WKU TD: Joey Belgan 4-yard pass from Bailey Zappe (Brayden Narveson kick)
  MSU 21–10; 3 plays, 65 yards, 0:57

Second Quarter

- (11:42) WKU FG: Brayden Narveson 29-yard field goal
  MSU 21–13; 13 plays, 61 yards, 4:53
- (09:10) MSU TD: Kenneth Walker III 5-yard run (Matt Coghlin kick)
  MSU 28–13; 6 plays, 68 yards, 2:27
- (06:51) WKU FG: Brayden Narveson 35-yard field goal
  MSU 28–16; 8 plays 58 yards, 2:19
- (02:39) MSU TD: Kenneth Walker III 3-yard run (Matt Coghlin kick)
  MSU 35–16; 9 plays, 66 yards, 4:36
- (00:41) MSU TD: Payton Thorne 12- yard run (Matt Coghlin kick)
  MSU 42–16; 6 plays, 31 yards, 0:53

Third Quarter

- (00:43) MSU FG: Matt Coghlin 21-yard field goal
  MSU 45–16; 14 plays, 96 yards, 5:49

Fourth Quarter

- (13:13) WKU TD: Jerreth Sterns 28-yard pass from Bailey Zappe (Mitchell Tinsley pass from Bailey Zappe)
  MSU 45–24; 9 plays, 75 yards, 2:30
- (08:24) WKU TD: Joey Belgan 1-yard pass from Bailey Zappe (Brayden Narveson kick),
  MSU 45–31; 8 plays, 50 yards, 2:28
- (04:46) MSU FG: Matt Coghlin 20-yard field goal
  MSU 48–31; 12 plays 72 yards, 3:38

Passing

- WKU – Bailey Zappe: 46/64, 488 yards, 3 TD
- MSU – Payton Thorne: 20/30, 327 yards, 1 TD

Rushing

- WKU – Noah Wittington: 7 carries, 37 yards
- MSU – Kenneth Walker III: 24 carries, 126 yards, 3 TD

Receiving

- WKU – Jerreth Sterns: 17 receptions, 186 yards, 1 TD
- MSU – Jalen Nailor: 8 receptions, 128 yards

MSU, now ranked No. 17 in the AP poll and No. 16 in the Coaches poll, next welcomed Western Kentucky to Spartan Stadium for the first-ever matchup between the schools.

Western Kentucky got the ball first and the MSU defense quickly forced a punt. Reed repeated his heroics from the prior game against Nebraska, returning the punt 88 yards for a touchdown to give MSU the 7–0 lead. The Spartan defense again forced a Hilltopper punt on the next possession and MSU moved quickly down the field as Walker scored on five-yard run to push the lead to 14–0. On the ensuing possession, WKU moved to the Spartan 10, but the defense stiffened and forced a 37-yard field goal to narrow the lead to 14–3. Following a long Thorne pass to Mosely, Thorne hit Reed on a 46-yard touchdown pass to move the Spartan lead to 21–3. WKU answered quickly, scoring on a Bailey Zappe 4-yard touchdown pass to move within 11. Following an MSU punt, WKU again moved into MSU territory, but was forced to settle for a field goal, drawing within eight early in the second quarter. Walker's second touchdown run of the game on the ensuing possession extended the MSU lead to 28–13 with just over nine minutes remaining in the half. Once again, WKU moved into MSU territory, but had to settle for yet another field goal moving the score to 28–16. On the next possession, the Spartans went to Walker, as he rushed on six of the eight plays including a three-yard touchdown run to move the lead to 35–16. WKU quarterback Zappe was stripped on the next possession by MSU linebacker Cal Halladay and Halladay recovered the fumble giving the Spartans the ball at the Hilltopper 31. Six plays later, Thorne ran the ball in from 12 yards out to push the lead to 42–16 shortly before the half. WKU was able to get into MSU territory on the final play of the half, but were stopped at the MSU 29, ending the half.

In the second half, MSU was forced to punt on their first possession. Again, WKU moved into MSU territory, reaching the MSU three-yard line before multiple penalties pushed the Hilltoppers back to the 20. On fourth down, Zappe's pass fell incomplete as the Spartans took over at their own 20. MSU moved into WKU territory helped by an unsportsmanlike penalty on the Hilltoppers. However, MSU was stymied at the WKU three and settled for Coghlin's first field goal of the night, pushing MSU's lead to 45–16. With less than a minute remaining in the quarter, WKU took over and scored on a 23-yard pass. A two-point conversion narrowed the lead to 21. The Spartans turned to run game, but rested Walker on their next drive. After a first down, the run game came up short at the Hilltopper for 46. Walker reentered the game on fourth down, but could get nowhere on the play and MSU turned the ball over on downs. WKU's next drive was helped by a targeting call against Halladay and the Hilltoppers scored on a one-yard pass to bring the game within two touchdowns with under nine minutes remaining. MSU moved well on their next drive helped by an unnecessary roughness call against WKU. At the WKU one-yard line, Thorne was tackled for a two-yard loss forcing a field goal by Coghlin to push the lead to three scores. The Hilltoppers next drive ended at the MSU 40, but the Spartans were forced to punt with just over a minute remaining in the game. The Hilltoppers were able to get a first down on their last drive of the game, but let the clock run out as the Spartans won 48–31.

The Hilltoppers, playing a fast-paced, run-and-gun type offense, threw for 488 yards against the Spartan defense, but MSU forced one turnover and three field goals to keep MSU ahead. Meanwhile, the Spartan offense continued to play well, rushing for 192 yards, 126 by Walker. Thorne threw for 327 yards while Reed had 283 total yards (127 yards receiving, 151 yards on returns, and seven yards rushing).

The win moved MSU to 5–0 on the season for the first time since 2015.

=== Rutgers ===
Week Six: No. 11 Michigan State at Rutgers – Game summary

Quarter	1	2	3	4	Total
No. 11 Michigan State	7	14	7	3	31
Rutgers	7	6	0	0	13

at SHI Stadium • Piscataway, NJ

- Date: October 9, 2021
- Game time: 12:01 p.m.
- Game weather: 67°F, Wind: 11 mph NE, Sunny
- Game attendance: 41,117
- Referee: Larry Smith
- TV announcers (BTN): Brandon Gaudin (play-by-play), James Laurinaitis (analyst), Rick Pizzo (sideline)
- Source

Game information

First Quarter

- (06:51) RUT TD: Aron Cruickshank 4-yard pass from Johnny Langan (Valentino Ambrosio kick)
  RUT 7–0; 9 plays, 72 yards, 3:22
- (06:05) MSU TD: Jalen Nailor 63-yard pass from Payton Thorne (Matt Coghlin kick)
  TIED 7–7; 2 plays, 75 yards, 0:46

Second Quarter

- (12:10) RUT FG: Valentino Ambrosio 26-yard field goal
  RUT 10–7; 10 plays, 72 yards, 3:41
- (10:18) MSU TD: Jalen Nailor 63-yard pass from Payton Thorne (Matt Coghlin kick)
  MSU 14–10; 5 plays, 87 yards, 1:48
- (06:21) RUT FG: Valentino Ambrosio 29-yard field goal
  MSU 14–13; 4 plays, 2 yards, 1:03
- (06:10) MSU TD: Jalen Nailor 65-yard pass from Payton Thorne (Matt Coghlin kick)
  MSU 21–13; 1 play, 65 yards, 0:11

Third Quarter

- (07:13) MSU TD: Kenneth Walker III 94-yard run (Matt Coghlin kick)
  MSU 28–13; 1 play, 94 yards, 0:16

Fourth Quarter

- (02:07) MSU FG: Matt Coghlin 35-yard field goal
  MSU 31–13; 6 plays 23 yards, 2:19

Passing

- MSU – Payton Thorne: 16/27, 339 yards, 3 TD, 1 INT
- RUT – Noah Vedral: 16/31, 208 yards

Rushing

- MSU – Kenneth Walker III: 29 carries, 233 yards, 1 TD
- RUT – Isiah Pacheco: 11 carries, 47 yards

Receiving

- MSU – Jalen Nailor: 5 receptions, 221 yards, 3 TD
- RUT – Shameen Jones: 8 receptions, 109 yards

MSU, now ranked No. 11 in the country (AP and Coaches) traveled to face Rutgers for their third conference game.

The Spartans moved the ball into Scarlet Knight territory on the first drive of the game, but Kenneth Walker III lost three yards on fourth down at the Rutgers 22. MSU settled for a field goal attempt, but instead faked the field goal and punter Bryce Baringer attempted to run for the first down, but was tackled easily for a three-yard loss. Rutgers took advantage of the poor play and moved into MSU territory, converting a third-and-18 early in the drive and scored on shovel pass from four yards out to take a 7–0 lead. MSU, looking to answer quickly, did so as Payton Thorne hit Jalen Nailor on a 63-yard touchdown pass to tie the game at seven. MSU's defense forced a punt on the next Rutgers possession and the offense again moved into Knight territory. However, the drive came up short at the Rutgers 34, forcing MSU to punt. Rutgers moved into MSU territory as the second quarter began and drove to the MSU seven yard-line. However, the defense stiffened preventing any further advance by Rutgers and they settled for a field goal to retake the lead at 10–7. On the ensuing possession, Thorne again hit Nailor for a 63-yard touchdown pass to put MSU up 14–10. Following a punt by the Scarlet Knights, a bad snap led to a Rutgers fumble recovery at the MSU 13 with 7:24 remaining in the half. The Spartan defense prevented the touchdown following the turnover and the Knights settled for a field goal to draw within one. MSU answered on the next play as Thorne hit Nailor for a third time, this time on a flea flicker for a 65-yard touchdown pass to put MSU up 21–13. Following a punt by Rutgers, MSU moved into Knight territory, but poor clock management resulted in MSU attempting a field goal with one second remaining. Matt Coghlin's 35-yard attempt was no good and the Spartans went to the half with an eight-point lead.

In the second half, Rutgers was forced to punt on their first possession and MSU's offense went backwards on penalties and also punted. Following another punt by the Knights, the Spartans again struggled, going backwards again due to penalties and were forced to punt, giving Rutgers the ball at their own 40. However, the Spartan defense continued to hold the Knights and forced another punt that was downed at the MSU six-yard line. Looking to get the offense going, Thorne handed the ball to Walker. Walker made several Rutgers players miss en route to a 94-yard touchdown run that saw Nailor and Walker shaking hands as Walker ran into the end zone. The score, the longest play from scrimmage in Spartan history, moved MSU's lead to 28–13. The teams exchanged punts on their next possessions as the third quarter came to an end. Rutgers finally managed to move into MSU territory on their next possession, getting to the MSU eight yard-line, but the Spartan defense stopped the Knights on fourth down forcing the turnover on downs with 8:17 remaining in the game. The Spartans moved to midfield on their next possession, but Thorne was intercepted, giving Rutgers the ball on their own 44. The Scarlet Knights again moved into MSU territory, but Simeon Barrow sacked Rutgers quarterback Noah Vedral, forcing a fumble that was scooped up by Spartan defensive lineman Jacob Slade who returned it to the Rutgers 41. Following the turnover, the Spartans moved inside the 20, but could not move any further settling for a Coghlin field goal. The field goal, the 72nd of his Spartans career, moved Coghlin ahead of Brett Swenson for the most field goals in school history. With just over two minutes remaining, the Knights went to their second-stringers and turned the ball over on downs. MSU then ran out the clock to secure the 31–13 victory.

In the game, MSU became just the fifth FBS team in history to have a 300-plus yard passer (Thorne, 339), a 200-plus yard rusher (Walker, 233) and 200-plus yard receiver (Nailor, 221) in the same game. The Spartans dominated the Knights in yardage, outgaining Rutgers 588 to 377 in the win.

The win moved MSU to 6–0 on the season, making them bowl-eligible. They moved to 3–0 in Big Ten play.

=== Indiana ===
Week Seven: No. 10 Michigan State at Indiana – Game summary

Quarter	1	2	3	4	Total
No. 10 Michigan State	7	0	10	3	20
Indiana	3	6	0	6	15

at Memorial Stadium • Bloomington, IN

- Date: October 16, 2021
- Game time: 12:03 p.m.
- Game weather: 56°F, Wind: 10 mph NW, Sunny
- Game attendance: 50,571
- Referee: John O'Neill
- TV announcers (FS1): Aaron Goldsmith (play-by-play), Brock Huard (analyst)

Game information

First Quarter

- (08:02) IND FG: Charles Campbell 34-yard field goal
  IND 3–0; 13 plays, 70 yards, 5:01
- (04:33) MSU TD: Cal Haladay 30-yard interception return (Matt Coghlin kick)
  MSU 7–3

Second Quarter

- (14:21) IND FG: Charles Campbell 44-yard field goal
  MSU 7–6; 6 plays, 17 yards, 2;27
- (06:55) IND FG: Charles Campbell 25-yard field goal
  IND 9–7; 12 plays, 71 yards, 5:33

Third Quarter

- (07:54) MSU FG: Matt Coghlin 51-yard field goal
  MSU 10–9; 9 plays, 46 yards, 4:04
- (01:49) MSU TD: Tyler Hunt 12-yard pass from Payton Thorne (Matt Coghlin kick)
  MSU 17–9; 5 plays, 39 yards, 1:35

Fourth Quarter

- (12:56) IND TD: Stephen Carr 1-yard run (two-point conversion failed)
  MSU 17–15; 11 plays, 75 yards, 3:53
- (08:31) MSU FG: Matt Coghlin 49-yard field goal
  MSU 20–15; 13 plays, 60 yards, 4:18

Passing

- MSU – Payton Thorne: 14/26, 126 yards, 1 TD, 2 INT
- IND – Jack Tuttle: 28/52, 188 yards 2 INT

Rushing

- MSU – Kenneth Walker III: 23 carries, 87 yards
- IND – Stephen Carr: 19 carries, 54 yards, 1 TD

Receiving

- MSU – Jayden Reed: 4 receptions, 70 yards
- IND – Ty Fryfogle: 7 receptions, 65 yards

The Spartans, newly ranked No. 10 (AP poll) and No. 9 (Coaches), travelled to face Indiana in the battle for the Old Brass Spittoon. Indiana had three previous losses on the season, all to teams ranked in the top 10 of the AP poll in week six.

Michigan State got the ball first, but could manage very little as Kenneth Walker III was dropped for a two-yard loss on third and one. The Hoosiers first possession went into MSU territory, but the MSU defense, as it has done all year, stiffened inside the red zone. Indiana moved to MSU's two-yard line, but Angelo Gross sacked IU quarterback Jack Tuttle on third down to force a field goal attempt. The 24-yard field goal gave the Hoosiers the early 3–0 lead. The Spartans got their first first down of the game on an eight-yard run by Walker, but could manage no more and were forced to punt for the second consecutive possession. Taking over at their own 24, the Spartans forced the Hoosiers to a third-and-eight from the IU 26. MSU linebacker Cal Haladay intercepted Tuttle's third-down pass and returned it 30 yards for the first touchdown of the game, giving the Spartans a 7–3 lead. After the teams exchanged punts on their next two possessions, IU moved into MSU territory again, but the MSU defense forced another field goal try as the Hoosiers narrowed the lead to 7–6. Taking over early in the second quarter, the Spartans managed their second first down of the half, but were again forced to punt. Indiana once again moved into MSU territory but the Spartan defense continued to bend, but not break. The Hoosiers moved to the MSU seven, but were again forced to settle for a field goal which gave them a 9–7 lead. MSU took over with 6:55 left in the half, but were again forced to punt. Looking to expand their lead, the Hoosiers moved to midfield, but also had to punt giving MSU the ball at the 13 with 1:28 left in the half. MSU was forced to punt again, having to punt on all their first half possessions. With 25 second remaining, Indiana moved into MSU territory to set up a 55-yard field goal attempt which was no good as the half ended. As a result, the Spartans trailed 9–7 at the half.

Indiana got the ball to start the second half and again moved into Spartan territory. However, the MSU defense forced a punt giving MSU the ball at the 20. The MSU offense finally crossed midfield, setting up Matt Coghlin's 52-yard field goal to take the lead at 10–9. Back-to-back punts gave Indiana the ball at their own 27 with 5:25 remaining in the quarter. Defensive back Darius Snow intercepted Tuttle's pass at the Indiana 39 giving the Spartans good field position. Two plays later, following two laterals that left tight end Tyler Hunt with the ball, Hunt threw to Payton Thorne for a 15-yard completion that was initially ruled incomplete. After replay overruled the call on the field, Thorne returned the favor, hitting Hunt for a 12-yard touchdown pass, extending the MSU lead to 17–9. With just under two minutes remaining in the quarter, the Hoosiers moved into MSU territory again as the third quarter ended. Stephen Carr ran the ball in from one-yard out with 13 minutes remaining in the game to narrow the lead to two. The Hoosiers two-point attempt fell incomplete and the lead remained 17–15. Following a 28-yard completion to Jayden Reed, the Spartans reached the Indiana 28, but were forced to settle for a 49-yard field goal to give the Spartans a 20–15 lead with 8:31 remaining in the game. Following punts by both teams on their next possessions, MSU cornerback Chester Kimbrough sacked Tuttle and forced a fumble which he also recovered at the IU 23-yard line. Looking to put the game out of reach, Thorne threw to the end zone on second down, but the ball was intercepted with 3:14 left in the game. Needing a touchdown for the win, IU could not get past their own 26 and their fourth down pass fell incomplete. Taking over on downs, Walker rushed for 12 yards on back-to-back rushes to get the first down and seal the win as MSU was able to run out the clock. The win returned the Old Brass Spittoon to East Lansing.

After an offensive outburst (588 total yards) against Rutgers the previous week, MSU was held to 241 total yards against Indiana, the team's lowest total since 2012. Thorne only threw for 126 yards and two interceptions in the game while Walker rushed the ball 23 times, but only gained 87 yards.

The win moved MSU to 7–0 for the first time since 2015.

=== Michigan ===
Week Nine: No. 6 Michigan at No. 8 Michigan State – Game summary

Quarter	1	2	3	4	Total
No. 6 Michigan	10	13	7	3	33
No. 8 Michigan State	0	14	8	15	37

at Spartan Stadium • East Lansing, MI

- Date: October 30, 2021
- Game time: 12:00 p.m.
- Game weather: 50°F, Wind: 5 mph NE, Cloudy
- Referee: Ron Snodgrass
- TV announcers (Fox): Gus Johnson (play-by-play), Joel Klatt (analyst), Jenny Taft (sideline)
- Source

Game information

First Quarter

- (11:03) MICH TD: Andrel Anthony 93-yard pass from Cade McNamara (Jake Moody kick)
  MICH 7–0; 3 plays, 98 yards, 1:35
- (01:18) MICH FG: Jake Moody 26-yard field goal
  MICH 10–0; 6 plays, 22 yards, 2:51

Second Quarter

- (14:52) MSU TD: Kenneth Walker III 27 yard run (Matt Coghlin kick)
  MICH 10–7; 5 plays, 75 yards, 1:26
- (09:18) MICH FG: Jake Moody 38-yard field goal
  MICH 13–7; 10 plays, 55 yards, 5:34
- (07:16) MSU TD: Kenneth Walker III 8-yard run (Matt Coghlin kick)
  MSU 14–13; 6 plays, 75 yards, 2:02
- (03:45) MICH TD: Andrel Anthony 17-yard pass from J. J. McCarthy (Jake Moody kick)
  MICH 20–14; 8 plays, 78 yards, 3:25
- (00:02) MICH FG: Jake Moody 35-yard field goal
  MICH 23–14; 9 plays 54 yards, 1:11

Third Quarter

- (06:47) MICH TD: Mike Sainristil 19-yard pass from Cade McNamara (Jake Moody kick)
  MICH 30–14; 5 plays 54 yards, 1:46
- (03:58) MSU TD: Kenneth Walker III 1-yard run (Tre Mosley pass)
  MICH 30–22; 8 plays, 75 yards, 2:49

Fourth Quarter

- (12:29) MSU TD: Kenneth Walker III 58-yard run (Jayden Reed pass)
  TIED 30–30; 9 plays, 86 yards, 2:17
- (09:20) MICH FG: Jake Moody 36-yard field goal
  MICH 33–30; 9 plays, 57 yards, 3:09
- (05:08) MSU TD: Kenneth Walker III 23-yard run (Matt Coghlin kick)
  MSU 37–33; 6 plays 41 yards, 2:04

Passing

- MICH – Cade McNamara: 28/44, 383 yards, 2 TD, 1 INT
- MSU – Payton Thorne: 19/30, 196 yards, 2 INT

Rushing

- MICH – Hassan Haskins: 14 carries, 59 yards
- MSU – Kenneth Walker III: 23 carries, 197 yards, 5 TD

Receiving

- MICH – Andrel Anthony: 6 receptions, 155 yards, 2 TD
- MSU – Jayden Reed: 6 receptions, 80 yards

Following their bye week, MSU played the annual in-state rivalry game against Michigan at Spartan Stadium. Both teams entered the game undefeated with identical records of 7–0. This marked the first time since 1964 that the two teams have met while both being ranked in the AP poll's top 10. ESPN's Gameday pre-game show traveled to East Lansing to highlight the game; it was the first trip to East Lansing for the show since 2015. In addition, Fox broadcast the game as part of its Big Noon Kickoff.

Michigan State received the opening kick off and moved into Michigan territory, reaching the Wolverine 41. however, on a third down play, Spartan QB Payton Thorne threw a pass into double coverage that was intercepted at the Michigan two-yard line. Following a penalty on their first play and a short gain on first down, Michigan struck first on a 93-yard pass and run touchdown to give the Wolverines the early 7–0 lead. The Spartans neared midfield on their next possession, but were forced to punt with under 10 minutes left in the quarter. Michigan was also forced to punt on their next possession and the Spartans took over at their own 19. Thorne scrambled 22 yards for a first down to move the ball to midfield, but three plays later, his pass was tipped at the line of scrimmage and intercepted by Michigan. An unsportsmanlike penalty on offensive lineman Jarrett Horst set the Wolverines up at the MSU 30. Michigan was able to move to the MSU eight, but as the Spartan defense had done all year, the defense tightened up and forced Michigan to settle for a field goal extending the lead to 10–0. MSU moved into Wolverine territory on the ensuing possession and Kenneth Walker III scored on a 27-yard run on the first play of the second quarter to narrow the lead to 10–7. Michigan again moved into MSU territory on the next possession, but again were forced to settle for a field goal to increase the lead to six. The Spartans moved to midfield again and faced a fourth and one at the Michigan 48. MSU chose to go for it and offensive coordinator Jay Johnson called a play-action pass from Thorne to Jalen Nailor. Nailor was wide open on the play, but was tripped up at the Wolverine eight. Moving with tempo while Michigan attempted to substitute, Walker scored on the next play, an eight-yard rush to give MSU the 14–13 lead. With 7:10 remaining in the quarter, Michigan quickly answered on a 17-yard pass to retake the lead at 20–14. Looking to retake the lead with less than four minutes remaining in the half, Thorne was sacked and fumbled the ball at the MSU three-yard line. The fumble was recovered and ran into the end zone by a Wolverine. However, the play was reviewed by instant replay and the call was overturned, ruling that the Thorne was down by contact before the fumble occurred. MSU was forced to punt, giving the ball back to Michigan with 1:13 remaining in the half. Michigan moved to the MSU 17, but once again the MSU defense held its ground, forcing the Wolverines to settle for a 35-yard field to extend the lead to 23–14 with two seconds left in the half. MSU knelt out the clock to go into halftime trailing by nine.

Michigan got the ball to start the second half and moved to midfield, but were unable to convert a third and one as the Spartan defense stopped Michigan at the MSU 40. A false start on the next play left Michigan with fourth and five. However, on the ensuing punt, Michigan's punter fumbled the snap and attempted to run for the first down, but was stopped short give MSU the ball at their own 40. Following a holding call, MSU was forced to punt. Taking over at their own 46, Michigan moved quickly into MSU territory and a 19-yard touchdown pass moved the score to 30–14 with less than seven minutes left in the third quarter. Needing to answer to avoid getting blown out, MSU moved into Michigan territory, but were stopped short leaving a fourth and four play from the Michigan 29. Thorne threw the ball to Jayden Reed to the Michigan one yard line to get the first down and put MSU on the doorstep. Walker scored on the ensuing play to and Thorne hit Tre Mosley for the two-point conversion to narrow the score to 30–22. As the fourth quarter began, the Wolverines were forced to punt, giving MSU the ball at their own 14 with 14:46 remaining in the game. MSU was able to move to their own 42 and on third down, Walker slipped through the line for a 58-yard touchdown run, his fourth in the game, to draw MSU within two. Thorne then hit Reed on the two-point conversion to tie the game at 30 with 12:29 remaining. Looking to retake the lead, Michigan again moved into MSU territory, but once again the Spartan defense forced the Wolverines to settle for a field goal to give them the 33–30 lead. MSU was forced to punt on the next possession and Michigan returned it to midfield. Looking to put the game away, Wolverine quarterback J. J. McCarthy fumbled the ball on the first play of the possession and Jacub Panasiuk recovered at the Michigan 41. MSU moved to the Wolverine 23 before Walker scored his fifth touchdown of the game on a 23-yard run to put MSU back in the lead at 37–33. Michigan, needing a touchdown, again moved into MSU territory, but their fourth down pass fell incomplete giving MSU the ball at the MSU 31 with 1:43 remaining. MSU attempted to run out the clock, but could not garner a first down. With Michigan using their timeouts, MSU was forced to punt with 1:15 remaining and Michigan took over at their own 33. A 15-yard roughing the passer penalty on the first play of the possession put the ball at the Michigan 48. However, Charles Brantley intercepted the next pass at the MSU 40 to seal the win. MSU was able to run out the clock for the 37–33 win and retained the Paul Bunyan trophy for a second straight year.

Walker strengthened his Heisman Trophy candidacy by rushing for five touchdowns and 197 yards in the game, the most touchdowns by any player in the rivalry and the most scored by any opposing player in Wolverines history. Thorne threw two interceptions in the loss, but made two key throws on fourth down to extend drives. MSU was out-gained 552 to 395, but MSU's "bend, but don't break" defense forced Michigan to settle for four field goals, keeping the Spartans in the game. The win moved Mel Tucker's record to 2–0 against Michigan, the first MSU coach ever to start their career with a 2–0 record against Michigan.

The win moved MSU to 8–0 on the season, 5–0 in Big Ten play.

=== Purdue ===
Week Ten: No. 3 Michigan State at Purdue – Game summary

Quarter	1	2	3	4	Total
No. 3 Michigan State	7	7	7	8	29
Purdue	7	14	10	9	40

at Ross–Ade Stadium, West Lafayette, IN

- Date: November 6, 2021
- Game time: 3:41 p.m. EDT
- Game weather: Sunny
- Game attendance: 57,748
- Referee: Larry Smith
- TV announcers (ABC): Dave Pasch (play-by-play), Dusty Dvoracek (analyst), Tom Luginbill (sideline)
- Source

Game information

First Quarter

- (09:12) PUR TD: David Bell 5-yard pass from Aidan O'Connell (Mitchell Fineran kick)
  PUR 7–0; 9 plays, 52 yards, 3:37
- (06:23) MSU TD: Tre Mosley 26-yard pass from Payton Thorne (Stephen Rusnak kick)
  TIED 7–7; 6 plays, 75 yards, 2:40

Second Quarter

- (13:23) PUR TD: Broc Thopson 8-yard pass from Aidan O'Connell (Mitchell Fineran kick)
  PUR 14–7; 8 plays 70 yards, 3:28
- (04:50) PUR TD: Jackson Anthrop 39-yard pass from Aidan O'Connell (Mitchell Fineran kick)
  PUR 21–7; 4 plays, 51 yards, 1:13
- (01:04) MSU TD: Kenneth Walker III 14-yard run (Stephen Rusnak kick)
  PUR 21–14; 11 plays, 69 yards, 3:41

Third Quarter

- (12:19) MSU TD: Payton Thorne 32-yard run (Stephen Rusnak kick)
  TIED 21–21; 3 plays, 41 yards, 1:00
- (09:31) PUR TD: King Doerue 1-yard run (Mitchell Fineran kick)
  PUR 28–21; 7 plays, 70 yards, 2:44
- (06:31) PUR FG: Mitchell Fineran 29-yard field goal
  PUR 31–21; 7 plays, 51 yards, 1:32

Fourth Quarter

- (13:02) PUR FG: Mitchell Fineran 24-yard field goal
  PUR 34–21; 14 plays, 60 yards, 7:14
- (06:48) PUR FG: Mitchell Fineran 23-yard field goal
  PUR 37–21; 9 plays, 93 yards, 2:24
- (05:03) MSU TD: Tre Mosley 11-yard pass from Payton Thorne (Maliq Carr pass)
  PUR 37–29; 5 plays, 83 yards, 1:45
- (00:41) PUR FG: Mitchell Fineran 22-yard field goal
  PUR 40–29; 10 plays, 76 yards, 4:17

Passing

- MSU – Payton Thorne: 20/30, 276 yards, 2 TD, 1 INT
- PUR – Aidan O'Connell: 40/54, 536 yards, 3TD

Rushing

- MSU – Kenneth Walker III: 23 carries, 152 yards, 1 TD
- PUR – King Doerue: 13 carries, 33 yards, 1 TD

Receiving

- MSU – Jayden Reed: 4 receptions, 73 yards
- PUR – David Bell: 11 receptions, 217 yards, 1 TD

The Spartans, now ranked No. 5 in the AP poll, No. 6 in the Coaches poll, and ranked No 3 in the initial College Football Playoff rankings traveled to face Purdue on November 6.

MSU got the ball first and moved the ball well, moving to the Boilermakers' 38-yard line before Kenneth Walker III was tackled and fumbled the ball. The ball was recovered by Purdue and replay upheld the close call on the field ending the Spartans' drive. MSU's "bend but don't break" defense continued to bend, but broke on the first Purdue possession as the Boilermakers scored on a five-yard pass to take the 7–0 lead. MSU quickly answered as Payton Thorne hit Tre Mosley for a 26-yard touchdown pass to tie the game at seven with 6:23 left in the first quarter. The Spartan defense was able to fore a punt on the next Purdue possession, but the MSU offense also was forced to punt setting Purdue up at their own 30 with less than two minutes remaining in the quarter. Purdue quickly moved into MSU territory and Boilermaker quarterback Aidan O'Connell notched his second touchdown pass on the day to give Purdue the 14–7 lead early in the second quarter. MSU was able to move to the Purdue 26 on the next possession, but freshman kicker Stephen Rusnak, subbing for injured kicker Matt Coghlin, missed a 43-yard field goal. The teams each exchanged punts before Purdue extend the lead to 21–7 on a 39-yard screen pass for a touchdown. Walker narrowed the lead to seven with 1:04 remaining in the half on a 14-yard touchdown run. Purdue looked to extend the lead before the half, but the drive ended as the half ended at midfield with Purdue leading 21–14.

The Spartan defense forced a punt on the first possession of the third quarter and Payton Thorne tied the game at 21 on 32-yard run on MSU's first possession of the half. Helped by an MSU targeting foul, Purdue moved to the Spartan one before scoring on a one-yard run to retake the lead at 28–21. Following a three-and-out by MSU, the Boilermakers added to their lead on 29-yard field goal with 6:31 left in the half. Another three-and-out by MSU led to a seven-minute and 14 second drive that ended with Purdue ahead 31–21 following another field goal early in the fourth quarter. Trailing by 13, MSU moved into Purdue territory, but on a fourth down from the nine, Thorne's pass into the end zone was intercepted by Purdue. With just over nine minutes left in the game, the Spartans needed a stop by their defense, but Purdue again moved deep into MSU territory. The Spartans were able to keep Purdue out of the end zone, but another field goal move the deficit to 16 points with less than seven minutes left in the game. Facing their first loss on the season, MSU answered quickly, going 83 yards in under two minutes and scoring a touchdown on another Mosley catch from Thorne. The ensuing two-point conversion narrowed the lead to eight with 4:58 remaining. Again, needing a stop from their defense, Purdue again moved deep into MSU territory. Using up clock, the Boilermakers added another field goal with 41 seconds left in the game to push the lead to 11. With the game essentially over, MSU was unable to do much and lost 40–29.

Walker rushed for 152 yards and one touchdown in the loss. Thorne completed 20 of 30 passes and two touchdowns, but the MSU defense, which had been able to give up yards, but prevent touchdowns, struggled. Purdue notched 536 passing yards as O'Connell threw for three touchdowns. The loss moved MSU to 8–1 on the season, dropping them to 5–1 in Big Ten play.

=== Maryland ===
Week Eleven: Maryland at Michigan State – Game summary

Quarter	1	2	3	4	Total
Maryland	7	7	7	0	21
No. 7 Michigan State	13	14	7	6	40

at Spartan Stadium, East Lansing, MI

- Date: November 13, 2020
- Game time: 4:05 p.m.
- Game weather: 40°F, Cloudy
- Game attendance: 67,437
- Referee: Reggie Smith
- TV announcers (Fox): Joe Davis (play-by-play), Brock Huard (analyst)
- Source

Game information

First Quarter

- (13:43) MSU TD: Montorie Foster 48-yard pass from Payton Thorne (Matt Coghlin kick)
  MSU 7–0; 3 plays, 67 yards, 1:17
- (06:51) MSU TD: Jayden Reed 29-yard pass from Payton Thorne
  MSU 13–0; 5 plays, 71 yards, 1:59
- (00:03) MD TD: Peny Boone 4-yard rush (Joseph Petrino kick)
  MSU 13-7; 7 plays, 76 yards, 1:52

Second Quarter

- (08:11) MSU TD: Connor Heyward 2-yard pass from Payton Thorne (Matt Coghlin kick)
  MSU 20–7; 14 plays, 49 yards, 3:52
- (01:42) MSU TD: Kenneth Walker III 1-yard run (Matt Coghlin kick)
  MSU 27–7; 12 plays, 74 yards, 5:44
- (00:56) MD TD: Chig Okonkwo 32-yard pass from Taulia Tagovailoa (Joseph Petrino kick)
  MSU 27-14; 4 plays, 80 yards, 0:46

Third Quarter

- (09:37) MSU TD: Jaden Reed 3-yard pass from Payton Thorne (Matt Coghlin kick)
  MSU 34–14; 8 plays, 74 yards, 3:14
- (08:33) MD TD: Chig Okonkwo 32-yard pass from Taulia Tagovailoa (Joseph Petrino kick)
  MSU 27-21; 3 plays, 64 yards, 1:04

Fourth Quarter

- (10:34) MSU TD: Kenneth Walker III 3-yard rush
  MSU 40–21; 7 plays, 77 yards, 3:36

Passing

- MD – Taulia Tagovailoa: 29/48, 350 yards, 2 TD, 1 INT
- MSU – Payton Thorne: 22/32, 287 yards, 4 TD, 1 INT

Rushing

- MD – Peny Boone: 5 carries, 42 yards, 1 TD
- MSU – Kenneth Walker III: 30 carries, 143 yards, 2 TD

Receiving

- MD – Chig Okonkwo: 8 receptions, 112 yards, 2 TD
- MSU – Jayden Reed: 8 receptions, 114 yards, 2 TD

MSU, ranked No. 8 in the AP poll and No. 9 in the Coaches poll, returned home to face Maryland on November 13. MSU, now ranked No. 7 in the College Football Playoff, was scheduled to play Maryland twice in 2020, but both games were canceled due to COVID-19 issues at Maryland. After a rough game the prior week against Purdue, the MSU defense faced another challenge with Maryland quarterback Taulia Tagovailoa who led the conference in passing yards per game and a Maryland offense that was second in the conference in total yards.

Michigan State got the ball first and moved to midfield quickly. On the third play of the drive, Payton Thorne hit Montorie Foster on a flea flicker for a 52-yard touchdown to give MSU the 7–0 lead. MSU's defense passed its first test, forcing the Terrapins to punt on the ensuing possession. Starting from their own 16, MSU could do nothing on their next possession and were forced to punt. A second Maryland punt gave MSU the ball again, this time at their own 14. MSU moved into Maryland territory before Thorne hit Jayden Reed on a 29-yard pass for the Spartans' second touchdown of the game. The point after was no good leaving MSU with a 13–0 lead. With just under seven minutes remaining in the quarter, the Terrapins moved to midfield, but once again were forced to punt by MSU's defense. A quick three-and-out for MSU gave Maryland the ball with 1:55 left in the first quarter. This time the Maryland offense moved quickly down the field, helped by a 45-yard run by Tagovailoa and a touchdown run on the next play narrowed the lead to 13–7. As MSU took over to start the second quarter, they moved downfield on a 14-play drive that was capped by a two-yard touchdown pass from Thorne to Heyward to push the lead back to 13. Following another Maryland punt, the Spartans again moved into Terrapin territory and Kenneth Walker III scored on a one-yard run to move the MSU lead to 27–7. Maryland, taking over with 1:42 left in the half, answered the score on a 4-play, 80 yard drive to narrow the lead again to 13. MSU took over with 50 second left in the half and moved to midfield, but Thorne's Hail Mary pass was intercepted on the final play of the half as the score remained 27–14.

In the second half, Maryland looked to cut further into MSU's lead and quickly moved to the Spartan 16-yard line. However, MSU linebacker Noah Harvey, who had just committed a pass interference penalty on the prior play, intercepted Tagovailoa at the Spartan one-yard line and returned it to the MSU 36 to keep the lead at 13. Walker took over on the next possession, rushing the ball on four of the eight plays in the next Spartan possession before Thorne hit Reed for his fourth touchdown pass of the game, second to Reed, to push the lead to 34–14 with 9:37 left in the third quarter. Maryland answered quickly on their next drive, going 64 yards on three plays to return the lead to 13. On the ensuing Spartan possession, Thorne hit Hunt for an 11-yard pass completion, but Hunt was stripped of the ball and Maryland recovered at the MSU 33. Maryland quickly moved inside the MSU five-yard line, but the Spartan defense again stiffened and, after a 3-yard loss and an incompletion, sacked Tagovailoa for a 19-yard loss on third down. The 41-yard field goal attempt on the next snap was no good and MSU avoided giving up points after the turnover. With under six minutes left in the quarter, the Spartans moved to the 40, but a sack of Thorne on third down resulted in a punt. The Terrapins moved into MSU territory, reaching the 30 with the help of an unsportsmanlike conduct penalty on Xavier Henderson, but a sack of Tagavailoa moved the Terrapins back to midfield as the third quarter ended. Maryland was able to get close for a fourth and four play at the Spartan 24, but corner Ronald Williams Jr. broke up the fourth-down pass turning the ball over on downs. On the next MSU possession, Thorne hit Reed for a 28-yard pass play and Walker notched a 36-yard gain to put the ball at the Maryland 20. Following an unnecessary roughness call on Maryland, Walker scored his second touchdown of the game on a three-yard run to push the lead to 40–21. The two-point conversion attempt was incomplete, leaving the MSU lead at 19 points with 10:27 left in the game. The Terrapins reached midfield on their next possession, but again turned the ball over on downs. Following a punt by MSU, the Terrapins moved into Spartan territory, but again came up short on downs. The Spartans, taking over with 3:29 left in the game, were able to run out the clock to end the game and ensure the 19-point win.

Thorne threw for four touchdowns in the win while Walker kept up his great season, rushing for 154 yards on 30 carries and notching two touchdowns. The MSU defense, who had been torched for over 525 yards passing against Purdue, allowed 350 yards passing as MSU outgained the Terrapins 481–451. The win moved MSU to 9–1 on the season and 6–1 in conference.

=== Ohio State ===
Week Twelve: No. 7 Michigan State at No. 4 Ohio State – Game summary

Quarter	1	2	3	4	Total
No. 7 Michigan State	0	0	0	7	7
No. 4 Ohio State	21	28	0	7	56

at Ohio Stadium, Columbus, OH

- Date: November 20, 2021
- Game time: 12:10 p.m.
- Game weather: 49 °F (9 °C); Cloudy; Wind: SW 15 mph
- Game attendance: 101,858
- Referee: John O'Neill
- TV announcers (ABC): Chris Fowler (play-by-play), Kirk Herbstreit (analyst)
- Source

Game information

First Quarter

- (10:42) OSU TD: Chris Olave 23-yard pass from C. J. Stroud (Noah Ruggles kick)
  OSU 7–0; 12 plays, 86 yards, 4:12
- (08:03) OSU TD: Garrett Wilson 77-yard pass from C. J. Stroud (Noah Ruggles kick)
  OSU 14–0; 4 plays, 88 yards, 1:16
- (02:31) OSU TD: Chris Olave 43-yard pass from C. J. Stroud (Noah Ruggles kick)
  OSU 21–0; 4 plays, 71 yards, 1:24

Second Quarter

- (14:05) OSU TD: Julian Fleming 4-yard pass for C. J. Stroud (Noah Ruggles kick)
  OSU 28–0; 6 plays, 44 yards, 1:48
- (10:02) OSU TD: Miyan Williams 1-yard run (Noah Ruggles kick)
  OSU 35–0; 6 plays, 70 yards, 2:46
- (07:01) OSU TD Garrett Wilson 12-yard pass from C. J. Stroud (Noah Ruggles kick)
  OSU 42–0; 6 plays 57 yards, 2:15
- (01:37) OSU TD: Jaxon Smith-Njigba 5-yard pass from C. J. Stroud (Noah Ruggles kick)
  OSU 49–0; 10 plays 85 yards, 3:52

Fourth Quarter

- (14:55) MSU TD: Keon Coleman 12-yard pass from Payton Thorne (Stephen Rusnak kick)
  OSU 49–7; 8 plays, 51 yards, 2:32
- (03:30) OSU TD: Master Teague 1-yard run (Noah Ruggles kick)
  OSU 56–7; 16 plays 75 yards, 8:32

Passing

- MSU – Payton Thorne: 14/36, 158 yards, 1 TD
- OSU – C. J. Stroud 32/35, 432 yards, 6 TD

Rushing

- MSU – Elijah Collins: 3 carries, 29 yards
- OSU – Master Teague: 21 carries, 102 yards, 1 TD

Receiving

- MSU – Tre Mosley: 1 reception, 46 yards
- OSU – Chris Olave: 7 receptions, 140 yards, 2 TD

The Spartans returned to the road to face No. 3 Ohio State in Columbus. ESPN's Gameday pre-game show broadcast from Columbus marking the second time on the season an MSU game was part of the show.

With MSU's last ranked passing defense facing OSU's top passing attack, the Spartans won the toss and deferred, giving the Buckeyes the ball to start the game. OSU ran the ball only twice on the initial drive, moving quickly down the field and scoring on a 23-yard touchdown pass to take an early 7–0 lead. The Spartan were able to get a first down on their first drive, but could move no further and were forced to punt. Four plays later, the Buckeyes scored on a 77-yard touchdown pass to further extend the lead to 14–0. The Spartans were able to move into Buckeye territory on the ensuing possession, but Matt Coghlin's 46-yard field goal attempt was wide right leaving the deficit at 14. Four plays into the next possession, the Buckeyes scored again, torching MSU's secondary for a 43-yard touchdown pass and a 21–0 lead with 2:31 left in the quarter. MSU managed a first down on their next drive, but Jordon Simmons fumbled and the Buckeyes recovered at MSU's 44. Moving to the MSU three, OSU notched another passing touchdown to further extend the lead to 28 early in the second quarter. A three-and-out by MSU led to a one-yard touchdown run for OSU putting the score at 35–0 with 10 minutes left in the half. With the game essentially over, the Spartans again went three-and-out and OSU again scored, this time 12-yard pass to put the game well out of reach at 42–0. Following another punt, the Buckeyes scored their seventh touchdown of the half, a five-yard touchdown pass from C. J. Stroud (his sixth in the half) to put the score at 49–0 with 1:30 left in the half. MSU was unable to get anything going on their next possession, punting again and OSU knelt to run out the clock and take the 49-point lead into the half.

In the third quarter, the Spartans moved into OSU territory, but were forced to punt. The Buckeyes, finally content to run the ball, moved to the Spartan 18, but missed a field goal to leave the score at 49–0. A three-and-out gave OSU the ball again with 5:47 left in the quarter. With OSU finally turning to backups, MSU was able to intercept the ball and took over at midfield. MSU moved into Buckeye territory as the game shifted to the fourth quarter. Thorne then hit Keon Coleman for a 12-yard pass to break the shutout at 49–7. Following punts by both teams, the Buckeyes an eight-minute drive to move the Spartan one before another touchdown moved the score to 56–7 with 3:25 remaining. A punt by MSU gave the Buckeyes the ball with 1:20 remaining and they were able to run out the clock to end the game.

The loss ended the Spartans chances at the Big Ten Championship and College Football Playoff as they dropped to 9–2 on the season and 6–2 in conference play. MSU was outgained 655–224 with the Buckeyes throwing six touchdowns and gaining 449 yards in the air.

=== Penn State ===
Week Thirteen: Penn State at No. 12 Michigan State – Game summary

Quarter	1	2	3	4	Total
Penn State	7	7	6	7	27
No. 12 Michigan State	14	3	6	7	30

at Spartan Stadium, East Lansing, MI

- Date: November 27, 2021
- Game time: 3:36 p.m.
- Game weather: 28 °F, Wind: 12 mph SE, Snowy
- Game attendance: 66,312
- Referee: Jeffrey Servinski
- TV announcers (ABC): Sean McDonough (play-by-play), Todd Blackledge (analyst)
- Source

Game information

First Quarter

- (11:22) MSU TD: Kenneth Walker III 2-yard run (Matt Coghlin kick)
  MSU 7–0; 8 plays, 76 yards, 3:33
- (06:09) MSU TD: Tre Mosley 9-yard pass from Payton Thorne (Matt Coghlin kick)
  MSU 14–0; 9 plays, 99 yards, 4:01
- (03:37) PSU TD: Jahan Dotson 27-yard pass from Sean Clifford (Jordan Stout kick)
  MSU 14–7; 6 plays 68 yards, 2:27

Second Quarter

- (12:11) PSU TD: Jahan Dotson 30-yard pass from Sean Clifford (Jordan Sout kick_
  Tied 14–14; 3 plays 46 yards, 0:23
- (05:59) MSU FG: Matt Coghlin 22-yard field goal
  MSU 17–14; 15 plays, 70 yards, 6:12

Third Quarter

- (11:07) PSU TD: Daequan Hardy 17-yard interception return (kick failed)
  PSU 20–17
- (02:14) MSU TD: Peyton Thorne 1-yard run (kick failed)
  MSU 23–20; 15 plays, 75 yards, 8:53

Fourth Quarter

- (05:10) MSU TD: Jayden Reed 20-yard pass from Peyton Thorne (Evan Johnson kick)
  MSU 30–20; 7 plays, 48 yards; 3:19
- (00:43) PSU TD: Parker Washington 15-yard pass from Sean Clifford (Jake Pinegar kick)
  MSU 30–27; 13 plays, 77 yards, 3:19

Passing

- PSU – Sean Clifford: 23/34, 313 yards, 3 TD
- MSU – Payton Thorne: 19/30, 268 yards, 2 TD, 1 INT

Rushing

- PSU – Keyvone Lee: 15 carries, 83 yards
- MSU – Kenneth Walker III: 30 carries, 146 yards, 1 TD

Receiving

- PSU – Jahan Dotson: 8 receptions, 137 yards, 2 TD
- MSU – Jayden Reed: 6 receptions, 89 yards, 1 TD

The Spartans returned home for the final game of the regular season with the Land Grant Trophy at stake against Penn State.

In snowy, windy weather that got progressively worse throughout the game, MSU started well, moving to the Nittany Lion two-yard line before Kenneth Walker III scored to give MSU a 7–0 lead. After forcing Penn State into a three-and-out, the Spartans again quickly moved downfield and scoring on a nine-yard pass from Payton Thorne to Tre Mosley to take a 14–0 lead with just over six minutes remaining in the first quarter. Penn State quickly answered however, scoring on a 27-yard touchdown pass against MSU's beleaguered secondary to pull within seven. MSU came up short on their next possession and were forced to punt. PSU could not get past midfield on the ensuing possession and were forced to punt early in the second quarter. Starting from their own seven, the Spartans could not move the ball on two plays. Thorne was then hit on a third-down scramble that appeared to be a targeting penalty that would have extended the drive, but no call was made and the Spartans were forced to punt from the back of their end zone. Starting at midfield, PSU wasted no time, scoring through the air again on three plays to tie the score at 14. MSU answered by embarking on a 15-play, 70-yard drive, that came up short at the Penn State five. Coghlin hit the 23-yard field goal, despite slipping slightly in the snowy conditions. Coghlin would not return to the game after the kick due to an injury that appeared related to his ongoing hip problem. The Lions took over and methodically moved down the field, but the MSU defense stiffened inside their own 10 and Penn State settled for a field goal attempt that went wide, leaving MSU with the 17–14 lead after running out the clock until halftime.

In the second half, the snowy conditions continued to worsen and PSU's opening drive stalled at midfield. The ensuing punt pinned MSU inside its own 10. On third down, Thorne was intercepted by Daequan Hardy who easily returned the ball for a 17-yard touchdown, giving PSU the 20–17 lead. The extra point kick was no good as the weather conditions continued to deteriorate. Trailing for the first time in the game, the Spartans moved methodically down field on a 15-play, 75-yard drive capped by a Thorne one-yard quarterback sneak for the touchdown. The extra point was no good, but MSU had regained the lead, 23–20. The drive took up just under nine minutes of the third quarter. PSU took over and moved into Spartan territory, but were stopped at the MSU 16 on third down. With weather conditions still making field goal attempts difficult, PSU elected to go for it on fourth-and-one, but were stuffed on the run play, turning the ball over to MSU with 12:43 left in the game. MSU managed two first downs, but were forced to punt. The punt, a bad one due in part to the weather conditions, gave Penn State the ball at their own 40. However, two plays later Haladay forced a fumble that was recovered by Beesly giving MSU the ball at the PSU 48. MSU moved to the Penn State twenty, but an eight-yard loss on an end around and an incomplete pass left MSU at a fourth and 15 from the Lions' 20-yard line. Following a timeout, Thorne hit Reed on a jump ball pass in the end zone for a touchdown to extend MSU's lead. Evan Johnson kicked the extra point for the Spartans and MSU had a 10-point lead with just over five minutes remaining. On the ensuing kickoff, PSU fumbled the ball and Justin White recovered it, giving MSU the ball at the PSU 29. MSU moved to the Lion 22, but on fourth down, Walker was stopped for a loss, giving the Lions the ball back with 4:02 remaining. Trailing by 10, the Lions were able to move into MSU territory and top off the drive with 15-yard touchdown pass to narrow the lead to 30–27. PSU's onside kick was recovered by Jayden Reed, and MSU was able to kneel out the clock to ensure the three-point victory.

Michigan State reclaimed the Land Grant Trophy, held by Penn State for the last two seasons. With the victory, MSU reached 10 wins for the first time since 2017, and went undefeated at home (6–0) for the first time since 2015. Walker rushed for 146 yards in the snow while Thorne accounted for three touchdowns (two passes and one rush) in the win.

=== Peach Bowl vs. Pittsburgh ===
Peach Bowl: No. 12 Pittsburgh vs. No. 10 Michigan State – Game summary

Quarter	1	2	3	4	Total
No. 12 Pittsburgh	7	7	7	0	21
No. 10 Michigan State	10	0	0	21	31

at Mercedes-Benz Stadium, Atlanta, GA

- Date: December 30, 2021
- Game time: 7:00 p.m.
- Game weather: 64 °F, Wind: 5 mph WSW, Indoor (roof open)
- Game attendance: 41,230
- Referee: Steve Marlowe
- TV announcers (ESPN): Mark Jones (play-by-play), Robert Griffin III (analyst), Quint Kessenich (sideline)
- Source

Game information

First Quarter

- (13:11) MSU TD: Jayden Reed 28-yard pass from Payton Thorne (Matt Coghlin kick)
  MSU 7–0; 3 plays, 29 yards, 0:45
- (07:57) PITT TD: Nick Patti 16-yard run (Sam Scarton kick)
  Tied 7–7; 12 plays, 75 yards, 5:14
- (02:39) MSU FG: MSU FG: Matt Coghlin 36-yard field goal
  MSU 10–7; 11 plays, 57 yards, 5:14

Second Quarter

- (01:02) PITT TD: Jared Wayne 4-yard pass from Davis Beville (Sam Scarton kick)
  PITT 14–10; 6 plays, 87 yards, 1:01

Third Quarter

- (14:40) PITT TD: Cam Bright 26-yard fumble recovery (Sam Scarton kick)
  PITT 21–10

Fourth Quarter

- (08:06) MSU TD: Connor Heyward 15-yard pass from Payton Thorne (conversion failed)
  PITT 21–16; 13 plays, 70 yards, 6:47
- (02:51) MSU TD: Jayden Reed 22-yard pass from Payton Thorne (Jalen Nailor pass)
  MSU 24–21; 11 plays, 71 yards, 2:46
- (00:22) MSU TD: Cal Haladay 78-yard interception return (Matt Coghlin kick)
  MSU 31–21

Passing

- PITT – Davis Beville: 14/18, 149yards, 1 TD, 1 INT
- MSU – Payton Thorne: 29/50, 354 yards, 3 TD, 1 INT

Rushing

- PITT – Vincent Davis: 12 carries, 49 yards
- MSU – Jordon Simmons: 16carries, 36 yards

Receiving

- PITT – Jordan Addison: 7 receptions, 114 yards
- MSU – Jalen Nailor: 6 receptions, 108 yards

MSU, now ranked No. 10 in the CFP, played in the Peach Bowl against the ACC champions, No. 12-ranked Pittsburgh, on December 30. Walker and Heisman Trophy finalist Kenny Pickett, quarterback for Pitt, announced that they would not play in the game in order to prepare for the NFL draft.

MSU started the game well, after pinning Pitt inside their five-yard line on the opening drive, MSU took over on the ensuing punt at the Pitt 29. Three plays later, Thorne hit Reed on a 28-yard touchdown pass to give MSU the 7–0 lead. The Panthers answered on the next possession, moving down the field on a 12-play, 75-yard drive capped off by Pickett's backup, Nick Patti, scoring on a 16-yard run to tie the game at seven. However, on the run, Patti dived to the pylon and landed awkwardly, injuring his left shoulder. He was helped off the field and would not return with what was later determined to be a broken left clavicle. The Spartans moved into Pitt territory on their next possession, reaching the Pitt 11-yard line. However, the drive sputtered and MSU had to settle for a 36-yard field goal to take a 10–7 lead. Pitt's next possession moved the game into the second quarter, but the Spartan defense forced a punt. MSU moved once again into Pitt territory as Thorne hit Jalen Nailor, making his return after missing the last four games of the season, on a 50-yard pass to the Pitt four-yard line. However, a penalty and a sack left MSU at the 15 with a field goal attempt that went wide leaving the score 10–7. Following a three-and-out by Pitt, MSU again moved into Pitt territory, but were stymied at midfield and forced to punt. Another three-and-out left MSU with the ball with under six minutes left in the half. Moving again into Panther territory, Thorne was intercepted at the Pitt 13 ending the drive. The Panthers took advantage of the turnover, quickly moving downfield and with a minute remaining, third-string Pitt quarterback Davis Beville hit Jared Wayne for a four-yard touchdown to give Pitt the 14–10 lead. Taking over with 58 seconds left in the half, the Spartans gained a first down, but a sack of Thorne ended any hopes of a late scoring drive and the Spartans ran out the clock.

Getting the ball first in the second half, Thorne threw two incompletions before attempting to scramble and was stripped of the ball. The fumble was picked up by Pitt linebacker Cam Bright and returned 26 yards for a touchdown extending the Panther lead to 21–10. Again, the MSU offense moved into Pitt territory, but with fourth down at the Pitt 28, Thorne's pass was incomplete and the Spartans turned the ball over on downs. The Spartan defense forced yet another three-and-out, but MSU could not get a first down on the next possession and was forced to punt. Yet another three-and-out gave the ball back to the Spartans with less than five minutes remaining in the quarter. MSU moved to midfield and facing a fourth and five at their own 41, Thorne hit Nailor for a first down to keep the drive moving. However, another sack of Thorne resulted in only the third punt of the game for the Spartans. Yet again, the Spartan defense kept Pitt from doing any damage offensively and MSU took over as the fourth quarter began. MSU again moved into Pitt territory and reached the Panther five before a penalty and a sack of Thorne moved the ball back to the Pitt 15. On third down, Thorne hit Heyward on a 15-yard touchdown pass, a terrific catch by Heyward, to draw the Spartans within five at 21–16. However, the ensuing two-point try fell short after a false start penalty. Needing another stop, the Spartan defense again forced a three-and-out and MSU took over at their own 29 with 5:37 left in the game. The Spartans moved to the Pitt 22 before Thorne hit Reed on another touchdown pass to give MSU the 22–21 lead with 2:46 remaining. Thorne's pass to Nailor on the two-point attempt extended the lead to three at 24–21. Needing a field goal to tie and with less than three minutes remaining, Pitt moved steadily down the field, reaching the MSU 26 with 36 seconds remaining. On the next play, Cal Haladay repeated his Indiana heroics, intercepting Beville at the Spartan 22 and returning the ball 78 yards for a touchdown to give MSU an insurmountable 31–21 lead with 22 seconds left. A mistake by Pitt on the ensuing kickoff allowed MSU to recover the ball at the Pitt 23 and MSU was able to kneel on the final play to end the game.

The Spartans greatly missed Walker in the game, rushing for only 56 yards on 36 attempts. Thorne, though he struggled in the second and third quarters, threw for a career-high 354 yards and passed Kirk Cousins for the most passing touchdowns in a single season in Spartan history with 27. The much-maligned Spartan defense limited Pitt to 274 yards in the game, albeit mostly against the Panthers' third-string quarterback. MSU dominated possession in the game, running 86 plays to only 55 for Pitt. The win gave the Spartans their first 11-win season since 2015.
