= Derrick Harmon =

Derrick Harmon may refer to:

- Derrick Harmon (running back) (born 1963), American football running back
- Derrick Harmon (defensive lineman) (born 2003), American football defensive tackle
