= Toombs County High School =

Location
- 500 Bulldog Road; Lyons, Georgia 30436; United States; 32°11′20″N 82°20′14″W

Information
- School type: Public high school
- Motto: “Imagine, Believe, Achieve”
- Denomination: Toombs County School District
- Established: 1987
- School district: Toombs County Schools
- Superintendent: Barry Waller
- Teaching staff: 57.80 (FTE)
- Grades: 9–12
- Gender: Co-ed
- Enrollment: 896 (2024–2025)
- Student to teacher ratio: 15.50
- Hours in school day: 7:40 – 2:45
- Slogan: "Great Schools, Great Futures"
- Fight song: Glory, Glory
- Sports: Football, basketball, baseball, soccer, softball, volleyball (girls'), tennis, cross country, track and field, swimming, golf, wrestling, competition cheer
- Mascot: Bulldogs
- Team name: Toombs county bulldogs
- Rival: Vidalia Comprehensive High School
- Accreditation: Southern Association of Colleges and Schools
- National ranking: 1. 13,056
- Yearbook: The Mastiff
- Feeder schools: Toombs County Middle School
- Website: https://tchs.toombscountyschools.org/o/tchs

Toombs County High School is a public high school located in Lyons, Georgia, United States. The school is part of the Toombs County School District, which serves Toombs County, Georgia.

== Athletics ==
Toombs County High School's sports teams are known as the Bulldogs. This nickname was adopted from Lyons High School, which was combined with Toombs Central School in 1987 to form Toombs County High School. The Lyons High School colors were changed from red, white, and black to red, white, and navy, to represent Toombs Central School, whose colors were yellow and navy.

The Bulldogs compete in the Georgia High School Association's class AA in region 2AA. They are competitive in all sports but have historically been more competitive in football, baseball, and wrestling. Toombs County plays Vidalia High School each year in Toombs-Vidalia Week, a week filled with spirit leading up to the big game. Vidalia is the Bulldogs most competitive rival.

Toombs County has won one state championship in school history, which was in baseball in 1996.

=== Football ===
The Toombs County Bulldogs football team has won five region titles since its inception in 1987. The Bulldogs have an all-time record of 149–115–0. Toombs County has won five regional championships.

=== State Titles ===
- Baseball (1) - 1996(A)
- Football (2) - 1975(B), 2024(A-Div. I)
- Girls' Track (1) - 1977(B)
- Soccer (2) - 2023, 2024

The 1975 football championship was won by Lyons High School and the 1977 track championship was won by Toombs Central High School

== Notable alumni ==
- Travares Tillman (1995), NFL player and coach for the Georgia Tech Yellow Jackets
- Craig Campbell (1997), country music singer
- Nick Eason (1999), NFL player and coach for the Clemson Tigers
- Jeremy Beasley (2014), MLB player
