= Travares Tillman =

American football player and coach (born 1977)

Profile
- Position: Defensive backs coach

Personal information
- Born: October 8, 1977 (age 49); Lyons, Georgia, U.S.
- Listed height: 6 ft 1 in (1.85 m)
- Listed weight: 205 lb (93 kg)

Career information
- High school: Toombs County (GA)
- College: Georgia Tech
- NFL draft: 2000: 2nd round, 58th overall pick

Career history

Playing
- Buffalo Bills (2000–2001); Houston Texans (2003); Carolina Panthers (2003–2004); Miami Dolphins (2005–2007)

Coaching
- Calvary Day School (2012–2015) Defensive backs coach; Georgia (2016–2017) Graduate assistant; Georgia (2018) Defensive quality control assistant; Colorado (2019) Defensive backs coach; Michigan State (2020) Senior defensive assistant; Michigan State (2021) Cornerbacks coach; Georgia Tech (2022) Defensive backs coach

Awards and highlights
- 2× Second-team All-ACC (1998, 1999)

Career NFL statistics
- Total tackles: 187
- Forced fumbles: 2
- Fumble recoveries: 2
- Pass deflections: 15
- Interceptions: 4
- Stats at Pro Football Reference

Travares Arastius Tillman (born October 8, 1977) is an American football coach and former player who is the defensive backs coach for Georgia Tech Yellow Jackets. He played professionally as a safety in the National Football League (NFL).

Tillman played college football for the Georgia Tech Yellow Jackets and was selected by the Buffalo Bills in the second round of the 2000 NFL draft. He also played in the NFL for the Houston Texans, Carolina Panthers, and Miami Dolphins.

Tillman was hired on January 2, 2019, as the defensive backs coach for the University of Colorado, by new CU head coach Mel Tucker. He spent the previous three seasons (2016–18) at the University of Georgia. He was a graduate assistant working with the defensive backs for the first two years before transitioning into a quality control role with the defense for the 2018 season.

== Early life ==
Tillman was born on October 8, 1977, in Lyons, Georgia.

He attended Toombs County High School in Lyons, Georgia, and he was a standout in football, basketball, and golf. In football, he was a standout wide receiver, and as a senior, he was a Class A All-State selection and the Class 3-A Defensive Player of the Year.

== College career ==
Tillman attended Georgia Tech for four years. He was elected one of Tech's permanent team captains for the 1999 season. He was a three-year starter in the secondary who played free safety. He was the first Tech player drafted in 2000 with his selection in the second round (58th pick) by the Buffalo Bills. He finished his career with 236 tackles, ranking fourth in Tech history, among defensive backs.

In 1996, he was a backup and special teams performer. He played in nine of 11 games.

In 1999, he was the school's top defensive player and a second-team all-Atlantic Coast Conference selection for the second straight year. He played free safety and cornerback. He was fifth on the team in tackles, with 56. He was ranked the fifth-best free safety in the nation by The Sporting News preseason magazine. He was ranked among the nation's top ten safeties by Lindy's magazine, which tabbed him to its preseason all-Atlantic Coast Conference first team.

== Professional career ==
=== Transactions ===
He signed a two-year contract with the Miami Dolphins as an unrestricted free on March 4, 2005.

He was selected by Buffalo in the second round in 2000. He was waived by the Bills on September 1, 2000.

He was signed to the Houston Texans on January 14, 2003, and was waived on September 17, 2003.

In 2006, he played in 14 games. He was inactive for Thanksgiving Day game at Detroit with a left hand injury. He underwent surgery on November 21 to reduce and stabilize a fourth metacarpal fracture of his left hand.

In 2005, he played in all 16 games. He underwent surgery on June 14, 2005, in Fort Lauderdale, Florida, to debride a Meniscus tear and articular cartilage damage.

In 2004, he played in six games.

In 2000, he played in 15 games, including four starts, in his rookie season with the Buffalo Bills.

== NFL career statistics ==
Legend
**Bold**	Career high

Year	Team	Games		Tackles					Interceptions					Fumbles			
Year	Team	GP	GS	Cmb	Solo	Ast	Sck	TFL	Int	Yds	TD	Lng	PD	FF	FR	Yds	TD
2000	BUF	15	4	26	22	4	0.0	0	0	0	0	0	1	0	0	0	0
2001	BUF	13	6	33	22	11	0.0	0	1	0	0	0	4	**1**	**1**	**17**	0
2003	CAR	7	0	5	5	0	0.0	0	0	0	0	0	0	0	0	0	0
2004	CAR	6	1	6	5	1	0.0	0	0	0	0	0	0	0	0	0	0
2005	MIA	**16**	**10**	**59**	**37**	**22**	0.0	0	**3**	**38**	0	**22**	**5**	0	**1**	0	0
2006	MIA	14	7	47	30	17	0.0	**1**	0	0	0	0	3	**1**	0	0	0
2007	MIA	3	1	11	6	5	0.0	0	0	0	0	0	2	0	0	0	0
		74	29	187	127	60	0.0	1	4	38	0	22	15	2	2	17	0

== Coaching career ==
=== Georgia ===
After a few years coaching high school, Tillman joined the University of Georgia’s coaching staff. He began as a graduate assistant for the Bulldogs working with the defensive backs in his first two seasons with the program before transitioning into a quality control role with the defense for the 2018 season.

=== Colorado ===
Travares Tillman was hired on January 2, 2019, as the defensive backs coach for the University of Colorado, by new CU head coach Mel Tucker.

=== Michigan State ===
In 2020, he went with Mel to Michigan State, where he worked as a defensive assistant before being promoted to cornerbacks coach for the 2021 season.

=== Georgia Tech ===
On December 7, 2021, it was announced that Tillman would return to his alma mater, Georgia Tech as the team's defensive backs coach. Tillman was released from the Georgia Tech coaching staff after the 2022 season.

== Personal life ==
Travares is the third of four children, born to Vera Pearl Tillman. In 2006 Travares married fashion designer and celebrity wardrobe stylist Kiki Tillman (Kirchner) and together the couple has three children.
