= Kendell Brooks =

American football player (born 2000)

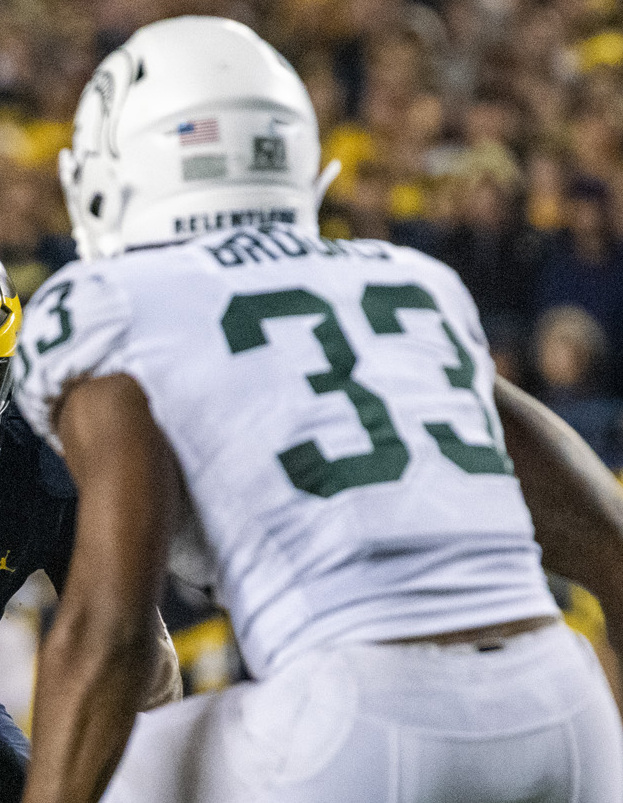
- Brooks with Michigan State in 2022

No. 30 – Tennessee Titans
- Position: Safety
- Roster status: Injured reserve

Personal information
- Born: March 3, 2000 (age 26); Swansea, South Carolina, U.S.
- Listed height: 6 ft 0 in (1.83 m)
- Listed weight: 206 lb (93 kg)

Career information
- High school: Swansea
- College: North Greenville (2018–2020); Michigan State (2021–2022)
- NFL draft: 2023: undrafted

Career history
- Arizona Cardinals (2023)*; Indianapolis Colts (2024)*; Washington Commanders (2024)*; Tennessee Titans (2024–present)
- * Offseason or practice squad member only

Career NFL statistics as of 2025
- Total tackles: 24
- Stats at Pro Football Reference

Kendell Brooks (born March 3, 2000) is an American professional football safety for the Tennessee Titans of the National Football League (NFL). He played college football for the North Greenville Crusaders and Michigan State Spartans and was signed by the Arizona Cardinals as an undrafted free agent in 2023.

== Early life ==
Brooks was born on March 3, 2000, and grew up in Swansea, South Carolina. He attended Swansea High School and was an all-state selection. He began his college football career with the North Greenville Crusaders, posting 78 tackles (including 56 in 2019), two pass breakups and a fumble recovery while playing in 19 games across two seasons (2018–2019).

The 2020 season was canceled due to the COVID-19 pandemic, and during that time Brooks worked for the family logging business, as a deliveryman at Pizza Hut, and as an employee at FedEx. He entered the transfer portal after the 2020 season and thought about joining FCS program Mercer before the FBS Michigan State Spartans called him. He accepted their offer, which included a scholarship.

In his first season with Michigan State, Brooks played mainly on special teams and posted nine tackles. He saw action on a total of 26 defensive snaps on the year. Entering the second game of the 2022 season, he was given a chance to start after an injury to Xavier Henderson and recorded seven tackles and a forced fumble against Akron. He ended up starting a total of 10 games in 2022, leading the team's secondary with 756 defensive snaps while tying for eighth in the FBS with three forced fumbles. He additionally totaled 100 tackles, which placed second on the team and was fifth-best in the conference.

== Professional career ==
Pre-draft measurables
Height	Weight	Arm length	Hand span	Wingspan	40-yard dash	10-yard split	20-yard split	20-yard shuttle	Three-cone drill	Vertical jump	Broad jump	Bench press
5 ft 11 5/8 in (1.82 m)	206 lb (93 kg)	31 1/4 in (0.79 m)	8 3/4 in (0.22 m)	6 ft 2 3/4 in (1.90 m)	4.45 s	1.56 s	2.48 s	4.32 s	7.27 s	35.5 in (0.90 m)	10 ft 5 in (3.18 m)	17 reps
All values from Pro Day

=== Arizona Cardinals ===
After going unselected in the 2023 NFL draft, Brooks was signed by the Arizona Cardinals as an undrafted free agent, being given $80,000 guaranteed in his contract which was the second-most of their undrafted signees. On August 29, 2023, Brooks was released by the Cardinals as part of final roster cuts before the start of the 2023 season.

=== Indianapolis Colts ===
On January 9, 2024, Brooks signed a reserve/future contract with the Indianapolis Colts. He was waived on August 14.

=== Washington Commanders ===
Brooks was signed by the Washington Commanders on August 20, 2024. He was released on August 27.

=== Tennessee Titans ===
On September 2, 2024, Brooks was signed to the Tennessee Titans practice squad. On December 7, he was promoted to the active roster. Brooks made his NFL debut during Week 14's game against the Jacksonville Jaguars on special teams.

On August 26, 2025, Brooks was waived by the Titans as part of final roster cuts and re-signed to the practice squad the next day. He was waived from the practice squad on September 1. On October 2, Brooks was re-signed to the practice squad and promoted to the active roster eight days later.

On August 30, 2026, Brooks was waived/injured and placed on injured reserve the next day after clearing waivers.

== NFL career statistics ==
Legend
**Bold**	Career high

=== Regular season ===
Year	Team	Games		Tackles					Interceptions						Fumbles				
Year	Team	GP	GS	Cmb	Solo	Ast	Sck	TFL	Int	Yds	Avg	Lng	TD	PD	FF	Fum	FR	Yds	TD
2024	TEN	5	0	1	0	1	0.0	0	0	0	0.0	0	0	0	0	0	0	0	0
2025	TEN	11	2	**23**	**12**	**11**	0.0	0	0	0	0.0	0	0	0	0	0	0	0	0
Career		16	2	24	12	12	0.0	0	0	0	0.0	0	0	0	0	0	0	0	0
