= Loyola High School (Detroit) =

- "Men for Others"

Location
- 15325 Pinehurst Street Detroit, Wayne County, Michigan 48238; United States; 42°24′11″N 83°10′0″W

Information
- Former name: Loyola Academy (August 1993 - July, 1996)
- Type: Private Roman Catholic Non-profit All-Boys Secondary (Grades 9 -12) education institution
- Motto: Ad Majorem Dei Gloriam (AMDG) - For the greater glory of God and "Men For Others. Men For Detroit."
- Religious affiliation: Roman Catholic (Jesuit)
- Established: 1993; 33 years ago
- Founders: Jesuits Roman Catholic Archdiocese of Detroit
- President: Fr. Tom McClain, SJ
- Chairperson: Barbara Runyon, Board Chair
- Principal: David Wiggins
- Enrollment: 150
- Campus: Urban
- Colors: Navy blue and White
- Fight song: On, Loyola
- Athletics: Varsity team name: Bulldogs
- Sports: Varsity sports teams Football, Basketball, Baseball, Bowling, Cross country, Track & Field, Swimming and Rugby
- Mascot: Bulldog
- Nickname: Loyola Bulldogs
- Website: loyolahsdetroit.org

Loyola High School is a private Catholic school for boys run by the USA Midwest Province of the Society of Jesus in Detroit, Michigan. It was established by the Jesuits and the Archdiocese of Detroit in 1993. It is one of the 57 Jesuit secondary schools in the United States.

== History ==
In the early 1990s, the Detroit Board of Education proposed starting several all-male academies in an attempt to address the alarmingly high dropout rate of high school boys. However, a U.S. District Court ruled that the plan violated the Michigan Constitution. Cardinal Adam Maida, recognizing that the Board's plan had merit, contacted Joseph Daoust, Provincial superior of the Detroit Province Jesuits, to discuss taking on this project. A year-long feasibility study conducted by Kenneth Styles concluded that a school of this type was needed and could be conducted on a non-public basis. The Archdiocese and the Jesuits decided to jointly sponsor the school, the only such arrangement in the country.

In August 1993 Loyola Academy – as it was called in its early years – opened its doors to 43 ninth graders in a small wing of the former St. Francis Home for Boys at Linwood and Fenkell. Longtime Detroit educator Malcolm Carron served as president, with Styles as principal and Wyatt Jones, Jr. as dean of students.

One year later, the school moved to its present location, two miles west on Fenkell in the former St. Francis de Sales School. Adding one grade at a time, the school reached its full, four-year enrollment in the 1996-97 school year and graduated its first senior class on June 1, 1997. Loyola has maintained a record of having all of its graduates accepted into one or more colleges or universities.

== Extracurricular activities ==
Loyola High School participates at the varsity level in the MHSAA Class C and Catholic High School League AA Division in football, cross-country, bowling, basketball, and track. In addition, there are junior varsity (JV) football and basketball programs, as well as a freshman basketball team. Other extracurricular activities include Student Senate, Kappa League, Publications, National Honor Society, and Debate Team.

In 2014 Loyola won the MHSAA Division 7 football state championship and finished the season with a 14-0 record.

== Notable alumni ==
- Derrick Harmon, college football defensive tackle for the Michigan State Spartans
