= Derrick Harmon (defensive lineman) =

American football player (born 2003)

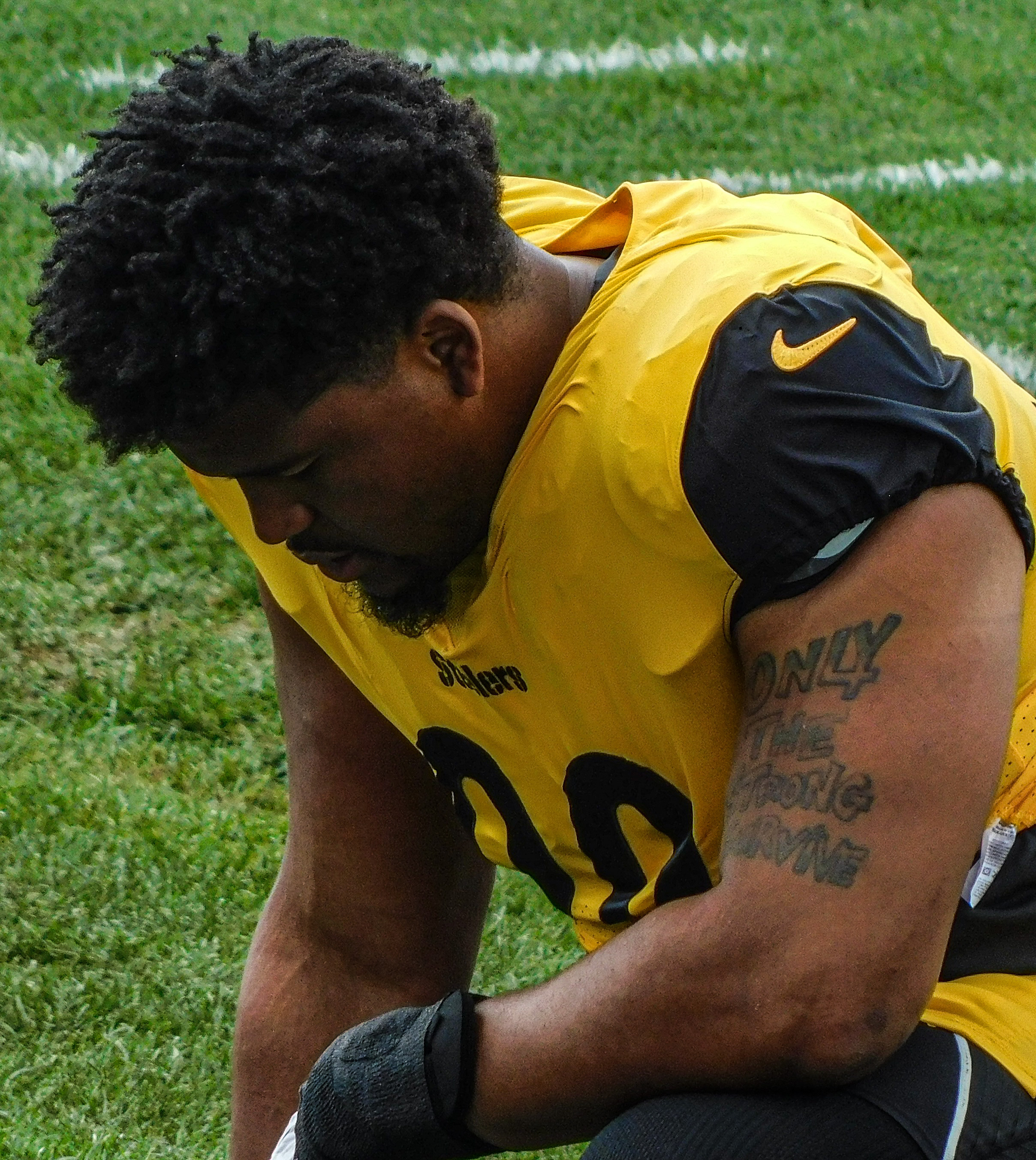
- Harmon with the Pittsburgh Steelers in 2025

No. 99 – Pittsburgh Steelers
- Position: Defensive end
- Roster status: Active

Personal information
- Born: August 3, 2003 (age 23); Detroit, Michigan, U.S.
- Listed height: 6 ft 4 in (1.93 m)
- Listed weight: 313 lb (142 kg)

Career information
- High school: Loyola (Detroit)
- College: Michigan State (2021–2023); Oregon (2024)
- NFL draft: 2025: 1st round, 21st overall pick

Career history
- Pittsburgh Steelers (2025–present)

Awards and highlights
- Second-team All-Big Ten (2024)

Career NFL statistics as of Week 4, 2026
- Tackles: 39
- Sacks: 4.5
- Forced fumbles: 1
- Fumble recoveries: 1
- Pass deflections: 1
- Stats at Pro Football Reference

Derrick Harmon (born August 3, 2003) is an American professional football defensive end for the Pittsburgh Steelers of the National Football League (NFL). He played college football for the Michigan State Spartans and Oregon Ducks. Harmon was selected by the Steelers in the first round of the 2025 NFL draft.

== Early life ==
Harmon was born on August 3, 2003, in Detroit, Michigan. He attended Loyola High School. He was a three-star recruit and committed to play college football for the Michigan State Spartans over offers from schools such as Memphis Tigers, Ole Miss, and Purdue.

College recruiting
| Name | Hometown | School | Height | Weight | Commit date |
|---|---|---|---|---|---|
| Derrick Harmon; Defensive tackle | Detroit, Michigan | Loyola | 6 ft 5 in (1.96 m) | 359 lb (163 kg) | N/A |
| Derrick Harmon; Defensive tackle | Recruit ratings: Rivals: 247Sports: ESPN: (77) | | | | |
Overall recruit ranking:
Note: In many cases, Scout, Rivals, 247Sports, On3, and ESPN may conflict in their listings of height and weight.; In these cases, the average was taken. ESPN grades are on a 100-point scale.; Sources:

== College career ==
=== Michigan State ===
As a freshman at Michigan State in 2021, Harmon played in four games to preserve his redshirt. In 2022 he played in 12 games making five starts, where he tallied 30 tackles with three of which were for a loss, and two sacks. In 2023, Harmon posted 40 tackles with three and a half being for a loss, a sack and a half, a pass deflection, and a forced fumble. After the season, he entered his name into the NCAA transfer portal. However, he withdrew his name a month later.

=== Oregon ===
On May 3, 2024, Harmon transferred to the Oregon Ducks. He started all 14 games that season, and was named to the second-team All-Big Ten team by the media and received second-team Associated Press All-American honors.

== Professional career ==
On January 6, 2025, Harmon declared for the 2025 NFL draft.

Pre-draft measurables
| Height | Weight | Arm length | Hand span | Wingspan | 40-yard dash | 10-yard split | 20-yard split |
|---|---|---|---|---|---|---|---|
| 6 ft 4 1/2 in (1.94 m) | 313 lb (142 kg) | 34 3/8 in (0.87 m) | 10 3/8 in (0.26 m) | 6 ft 11 3/4 in (2.13 m) | 4.95 s | 1.74 s | 2.89 s |
All values from NFL Combine

=== 2025 season ===
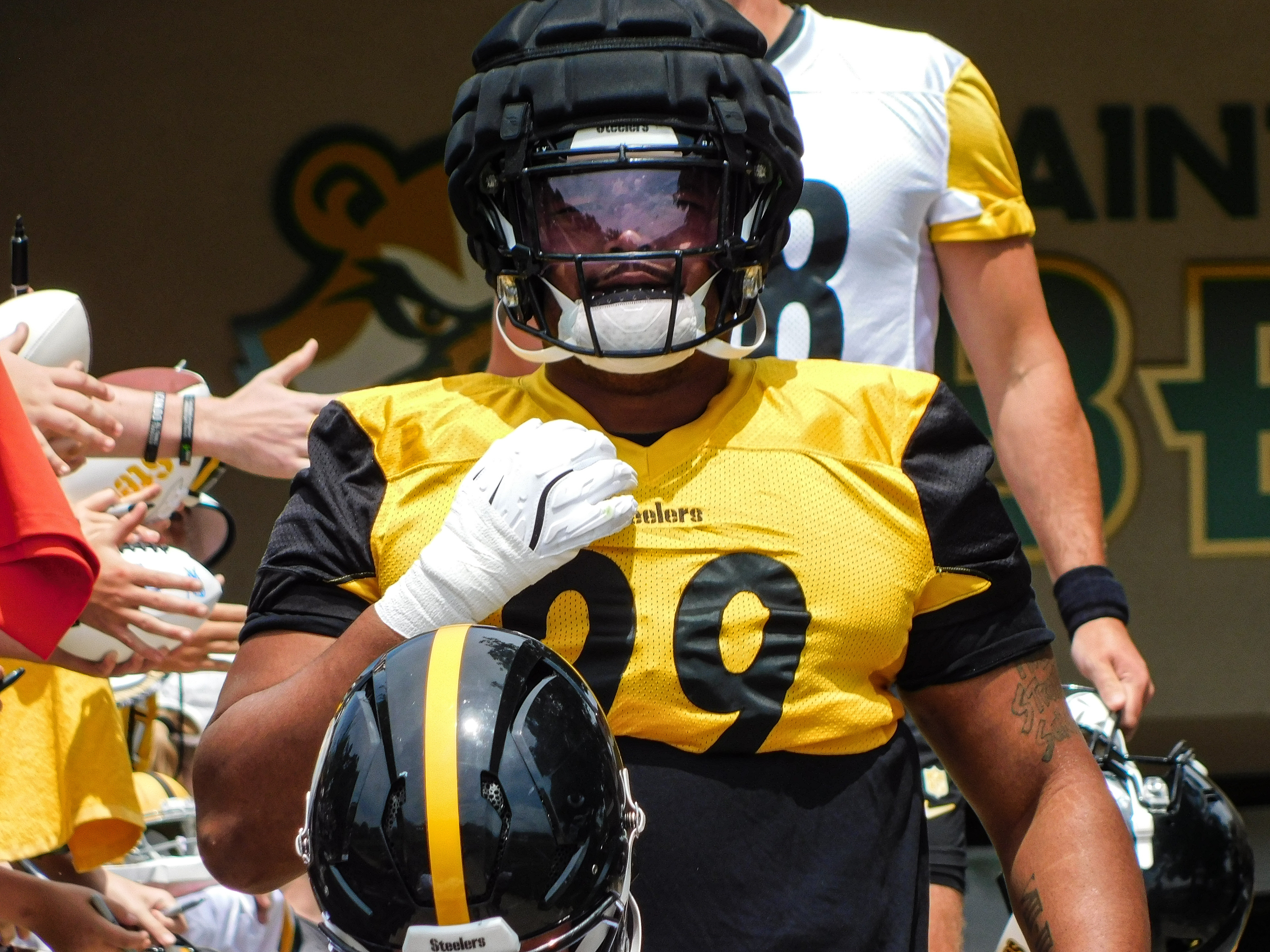
Harmon during his inaugural training camp, 2025

During the 2025 NFL draft, Harmon was selected by the Pittsburgh Steelers in the first round with the 21st overall pick. In the Steelers' preseason finale on August 21, Harmon suffered an MCL sprain. Harmon was the second consecutive first-round pick made by the Steelers who suffered an injury that kept him from playing in Week 1 after Troy Fautanu in 2024.

On September 21, Harmon made his professional debut in a 21–14 win over the New England Patriots. During the win, Harmon got his first sack against Drake Maye. He also recorded two tackles (both solo) and recorded one tackle for loss. Harmon was ruled out of participating in Week 13's matchup with the Buffalo Bills after suffering a knee injury during the previous week's contest against the Chicago Bears. At the end of the season, Harmon was presented with the Joe Greene Great Performance Award, given each year to the Steelers top rookie.

== NFL career statistics ==
Legend
| **Bold** | Career high |

=== Regular season ===
| Year | Team | Games | | Tackles | | | | | Interceptions | | | | | | Fumbles | | | | |
| Year | Team | GP | GS | Cmb | Solo | Ast | Sck | TFL | Int | Yds | Avg | Lng | TD | PD | FF | Fmb | FR | Yds | TD |
|---|---|---|---|---|---|---|---|---|---|---|---|---|---|---|---|---|---|---|---|
| 2025 | PIT | 12 | 8 | 27 | 11 | 16 | 3.0 | 1 | 0 | 0 | 0.0 | 0 | 0 | 1 | 0 | 0 | 1 | 0 | 0 |
| 2026 | PIT | 4 | 1 | 12 | 3 | 9 | 1.5 | 1 | 0 | 0 | 0.0 | 0 | 0 | 0 | 1 | 0 | 0 | 0 | 0 |
| Career | | 16 | 9 | 39 | 14 | 25 | 4.5 | 2 | 0 | 0 | 0.0 | 0 | 0 | 1 | 1 | 0 | 1 | 0 | 0 |

=== Postseason ===
| Year | Team | Games | | Tackles | | | | | Interceptions | | | | | | Fumbles | | | | |
| Year | Team | GP | GS | Cmb | Solo | Ast | Sck | TFL | Int | Yds | Avg | Lng | TD | PD | FF | Fmb | FR | Yds | TD |
|---|---|---|---|---|---|---|---|---|---|---|---|---|---|---|---|---|---|---|---|
| 2025 | PIT | 1 | 1 | 6 | 2 | 4 | 1.0 | 0 | 0 | 0 | 0.0 | 0 | 0 | 0 | 0 | 0 | 0 | 0 | 0 |
| Career | | 1 | 1 | 6 | 2 | 4 | 1.0 | 0 | 0 | 0 | 0.0 | 0 | 0 | 0 | 0 | 0 | 0 | 0 | 0 |

== Personal life ==
Harmon's mother, Tiffany Saine, suffered a stroke during his freshman year at Michigan State. She was on life support when Harmon was drafted by the Steelers, and died shortly after he came to the hospital to tell her about his selection.
