= Omar Khan (American football) =

Pittsburgh Steelers executive (born 1977)

Omar R. Khan
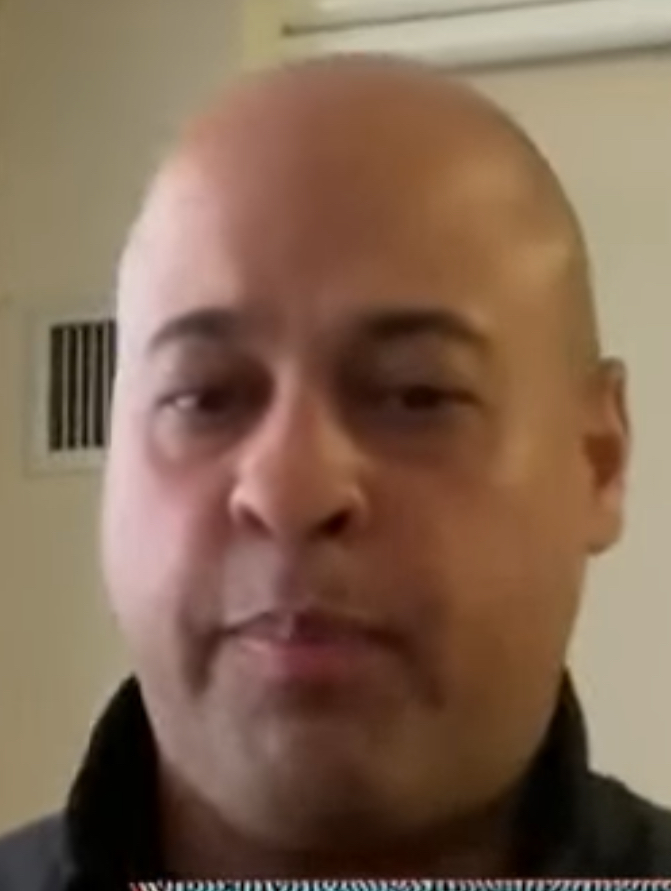
- Khan in 2022

Pittsburgh Steelers
- Title: General manager

Personal information
- Born: February 7, 1977 (age 49); New Orleans, Louisiana, U.S.

Career information
- High school: Archbishop Rummel (Metairie, Louisiana)
- College: Tulane

Career history
- New Orleans Saints (1997–2001) Football operations; Pittsburgh Steelers (2001–present); Football administration coordinator (2001–2011); Director of football administration (2011–2016); Vice president of football & business administration (2016–2021); General manager (2022–present)

Awards and highlights
- 2× Super Bowl champion (XL, XLIII)
- Executive profile at Pro Football Reference

Omar R. Khan (born February 7, 1977) is an American professional football executive who is the general manager of the Pittsburgh Steelers of the National Football League (NFL). Prior to serving with the Steelers, Khan previously served with the New Orleans Saints for four seasons.

== Early life ==
Khan was born and raised in New Orleans, Louisiana. His mother is a native of Honduras and his father is from India. After graduating in 1994 from Archbishop Rummel High School in Metairie, he matriculated to Tulane University from which he earned a degree in Sports Management with a minor in Business Administration in 3 1/2 years.

== Executive career ==
=== Tulane ===
As a student, Khan worked with the Tulane Green Wave football team as an undergraduate assistant.

=== New Orleans Saints ===
In 1997, Khan was hired by the New Orleans Saints to serve in their football operations department. Khan previously served as a scouting and personnel intern with the Saints while he was a student at Tulane.

=== Pittsburgh Steelers ===
In 2001, Khan was hired by the Pittsburgh Steelers to serve as their football operations coordinator in their football operations and player personnel department. In that role he has helped to assemble two Super Bowl winners. Along with general manager Kevin Colbert, in 20 seasons they have drafted and signed/extended over 30 Pro Bowl players. In 2011, Khan was promoted to director of football administration and in 2016, he was promoted to vice president of football and business administration.

==== General manager ====
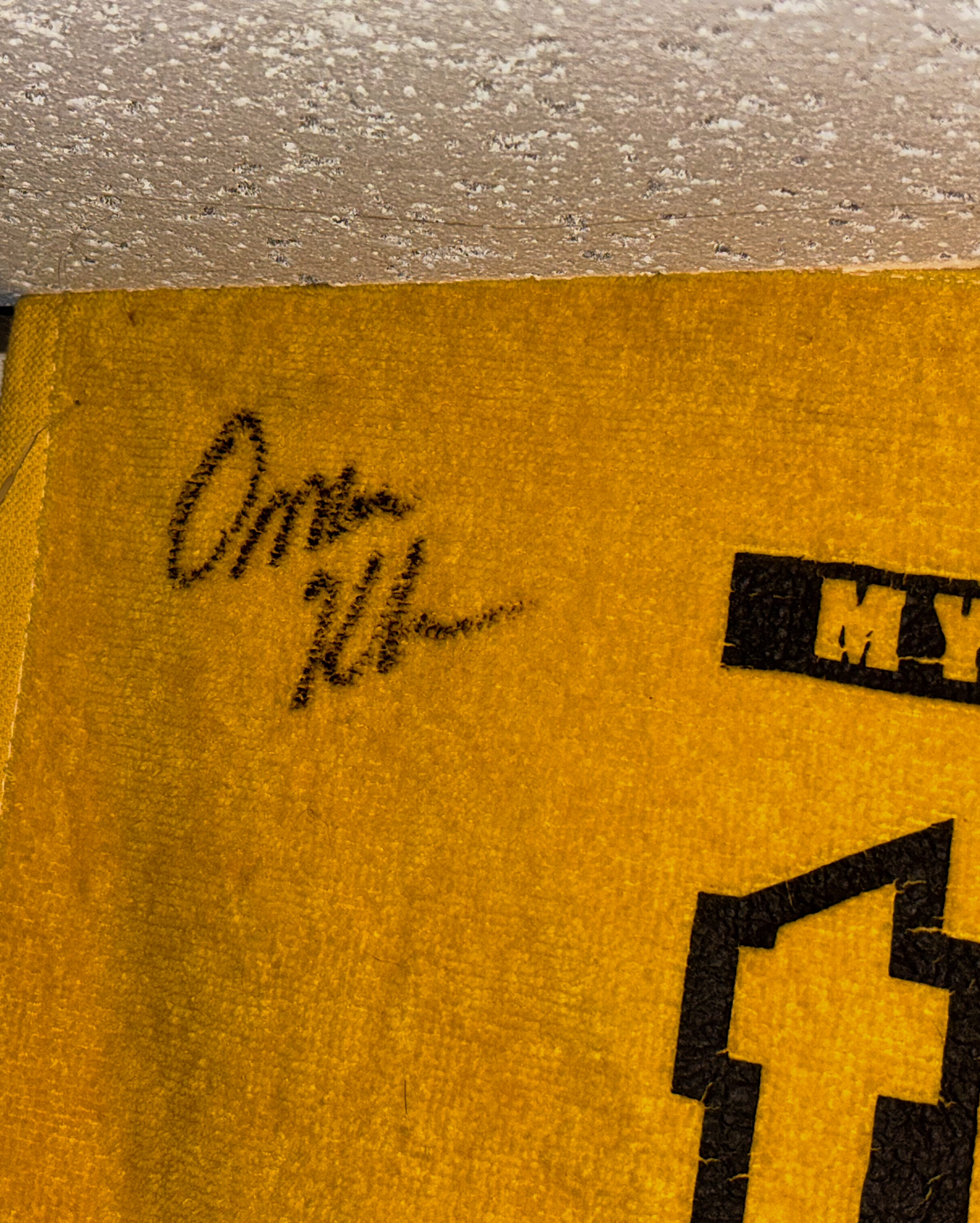
Khan's autograph on a Terrible Towel

Shortly after the 2022 NFL draft, Khan was promoted to general manager as the successor to Colbert. In his first draft for the Steelers, Khan made a draft day trade with the New England Patriots to move up from the 17th overall pick to 14th overall to select offensive tackle Broderick Jones. The trade to acquire Jones proved to be fruitful for the team as he took over the starting right tackle position during the 2023 season, starting in 20 games between both his first and second seasons while being graded by Pro Football Focus (PFF) with an overall grade of 58.5, only allowing 10 sacks while he was on the field. Khan's 2023 draft was graded an "A+" by Yahoo Sports with them regarding it as "the best draft in the NFL" for acquiring Jones as well as cornerback Joey Porter Jr. and defensive tackle Keeanu Benton. Khan began receiving recognition for his ability to scout and draft talent for the Steelers, earning the nickname "the Khan artist" by fans in 2023.

Early in the 2024 offseason, Khan was instrumental in trading quarterback Kenny Pickett to the Philadelphia Eagles as well as acquiring replacements in signing former Seahawks Super Bowl champion Russell Wilson and trading with the Chicago Bears for Justin Fields in exchange for a sixth and conditional fourth round pick.

The 2024 draft saw Khan select two players who only took limited snaps during the season with first round pick Troy Fautanu being placed on the injured reserve list after Week 2 and third round pick Roman Wilson being ruled out prior to the beginning of the season with an ankle injury. Despite these setbacks, Khan was able to select center Zach Frazier with the 51st overall pick. Frazier ended his rookie season being named to the PFWA All-Rookie Team and was named the team Rookie of the Year for the 2024 season. Two of Khan's acquisitions in 2024 became Pro Bowl selections with Russell Wilson and Patrick Queen earning their 10th and 2nd appearances, respectively.

In the 2025 offseason, Khan orchestrated a deal with the Seattle Seahawks that sent Pro Bowl wide receiver DK Metcalf to the Steelers in exchange for a second round pick in the 2025 NFL draft. He led a second productive free agency period for the team that included signings such as former Eagles running back Kenneth Gainwell and All-Pro cornerback Darius Slay, both of whom were a part of the roster that won Super Bowl LIX. This same offseason saw Khan sign former four-time league MVP Aaron Rodgers to a one-year contract worth $13.6 million on June 6, 2025. Khan also traded away wide-receiver George Pickens to the Dallas Cowboys

With the 2025 NFL Draft, Khan and the Steelers front office selected defensive tackle Derrick Harmon out of Oregon with the 21st overall pick. Additionally, he selected Kaleb Johnson, a running back out of Iowa, to replace Najee Harris, who signed with the Los Angeles Chargers in free-agency.

On July 3, 2025, the Steelers extended Khan’s contract, keeping him with the team through 2028.
