= Payton Wilson =

American football player (born 2000)

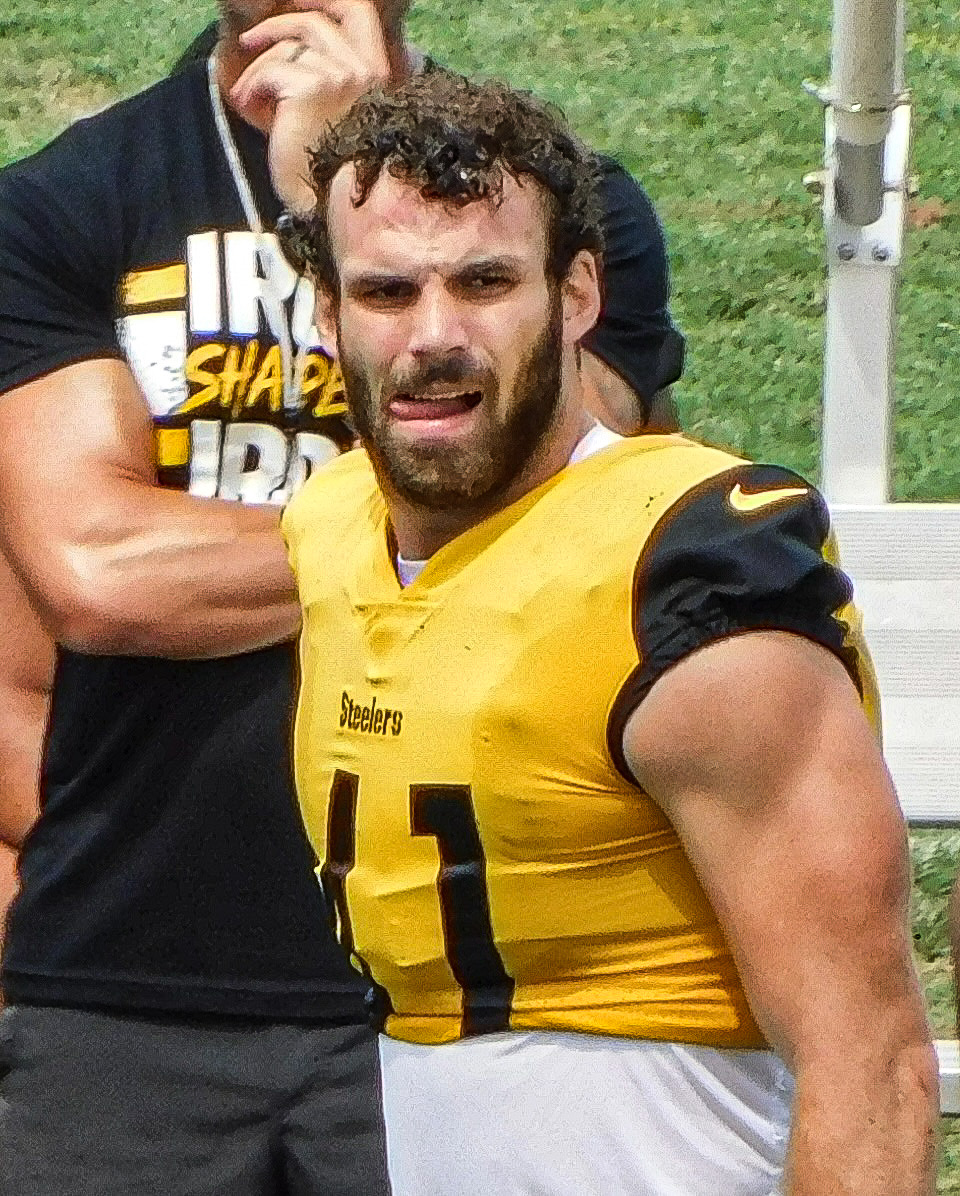
- Wilson with the Pittsburgh Steelers in 2025

No. 41 – Pittsburgh Steelers
- Position: Linebacker
- Roster status: Active

Personal information
- Born: April 21, 2000 (age 26); Hillsborough, North Carolina, U.S.
- Listed height: 6 ft 4 in (1.93 m)
- Listed weight: 242 lb (110 kg)

Career information
- High school: Orange (Hillsborough)
- College: NC State (2018–2023)
- NFL draft: 2024: 3rd round, 98th overall pick

Career history
- Pittsburgh Steelers (2024–present)

Awards and highlights
- Chuck Bednarik Award (2023); Butkus Award (2023); Unanimous All-American (2023); ACC Defensive Player of the Year (2023); 2× first-team All-ACC (2020, 2023)

Career NFL statistics as of Week 5, 2026
- Total tackles: 248
- Sacks: 3
- Forced fumbles: 1
- Fumble recoveries: 4
- Pass deflections: 6
- Interceptions: 2
- Defensive touchdowns: 1
- Stats at Pro Football Reference

Payton Tanner Wilson (born April 21, 2000) is an American professional football linebacker for the Pittsburgh Steelers of the National Football League (NFL). He played college football for the NC State Wolfpack, winning the Chuck Bednarik Award and Butkus Award in 2023. Wilson was selected by the Steelers in the third round, 98th overall in the 2024 NFL draft.

== Early life ==
Wilson grew up in Hillsborough, North Carolina and attended Orange High School. He was a three-sport athlete in football, wrestling, and lacrosse. As a junior, he made 127 tackles with 39 tackles for loss and 13 sacks. Wilson was also the 2017 North Carolina 3A 220-pound wrestling state champion his junior year. His senior year, he had 103 tackles, 21 tackles for loss, and 10 sacks before tearing his ACL. Wilson was rated a four-star recruit and initially committed to play college football at North Carolina (UNC) over offers from Clemson, Ohio State, and Virginia Tech. He later decommitted from UNC and signed to play at NC State.

== College career ==
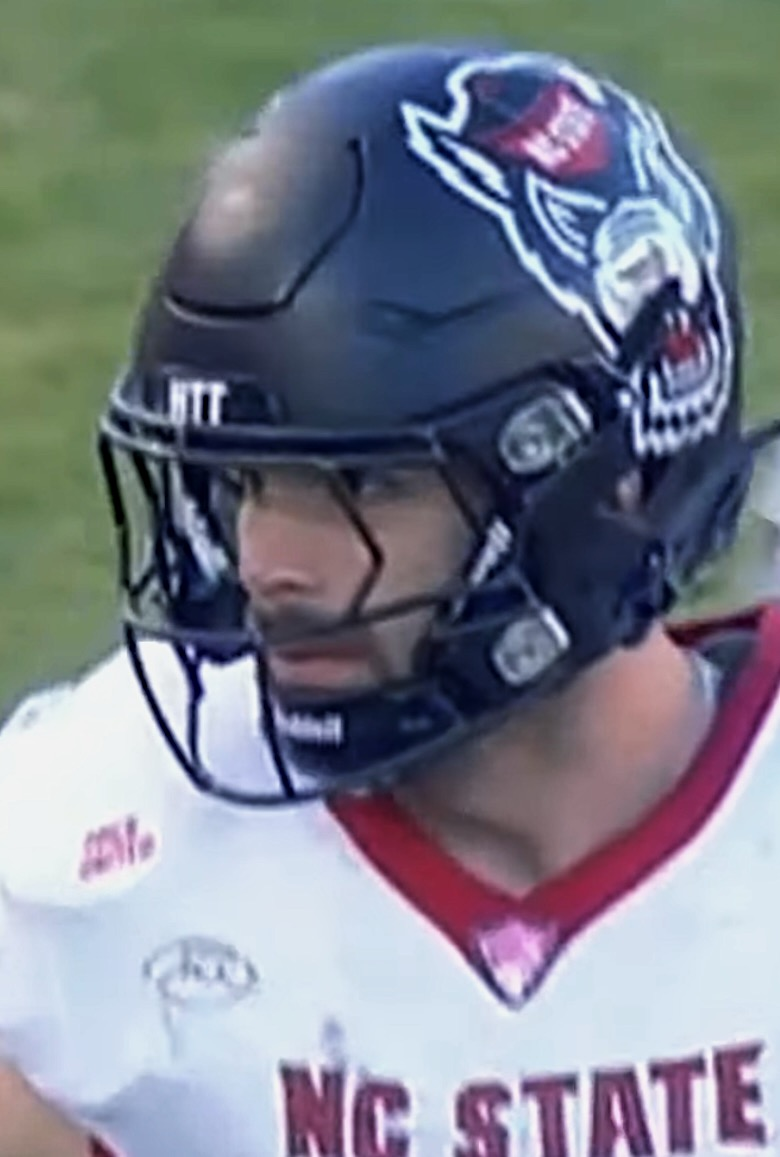
Wilson in 2023

Wilson suffered a second knee injury during summer training camp and redshirted his true freshman season at NC State.

He led the Wolfpack with 69 tackles during his redshirt freshman season. Wilson made 108 tackles with 11.5 tackles for loss, 3.5 sacks, and two interceptions and was named first team All-Atlantic Coast Conference (ACC) in his redshirt sophomore season.

He suffered a season ending shoulder injury in the second game of his junior season. He followed up his junior season with a total of 83 tackles with 39 being solo tackles. He had 4.5 sacks during the season and recorded an interception which he returned for 19 yards.

In 2023, Wilson received the Bednarik Award, given annually to the best defensive player in college football, and the Butkus Award, given annually to college football's best linebacker. He concluded his college career with 138 tackles (69 solo), six passes defended, 6 sacks, a forced fumble and three interceptions, all career highs.

== Professional career ==
Pre-draft measurables
Height	Weight	Arm length	Hand span	Wingspan	40-yard dash	10-yard split	20-yard split	20-yard shuttle	Three-cone drill	Vertical jump	Broad jump
6 ft 3 7/8 in (1.93 m)	233 lb (106 kg)	30 1/2 in (0.77 m)	9 in (0.23 m)	6 ft 3 3/4 in (1.92 m)	4.43 s	1.54 s	2.58 s	4.20 s	6.85 s	34.5 in (0.88 m)	9 ft 11 in (3.02 m)
All values from NFL Combine/Pro Day

=== Pittsburgh Steelers ===
==== 2024 ====
The Pittsburgh Steelers selected Wilson in the third round (98th overall) of the 2024 NFL draft. The Pittsburgh Steelers acquired the third round pick from the Philadelphia Eagles after trading Kenny Pickett and a fourth round pick to the Eagles for the 98th overall selection and two seventh round picks in the 2024 NFL draft.

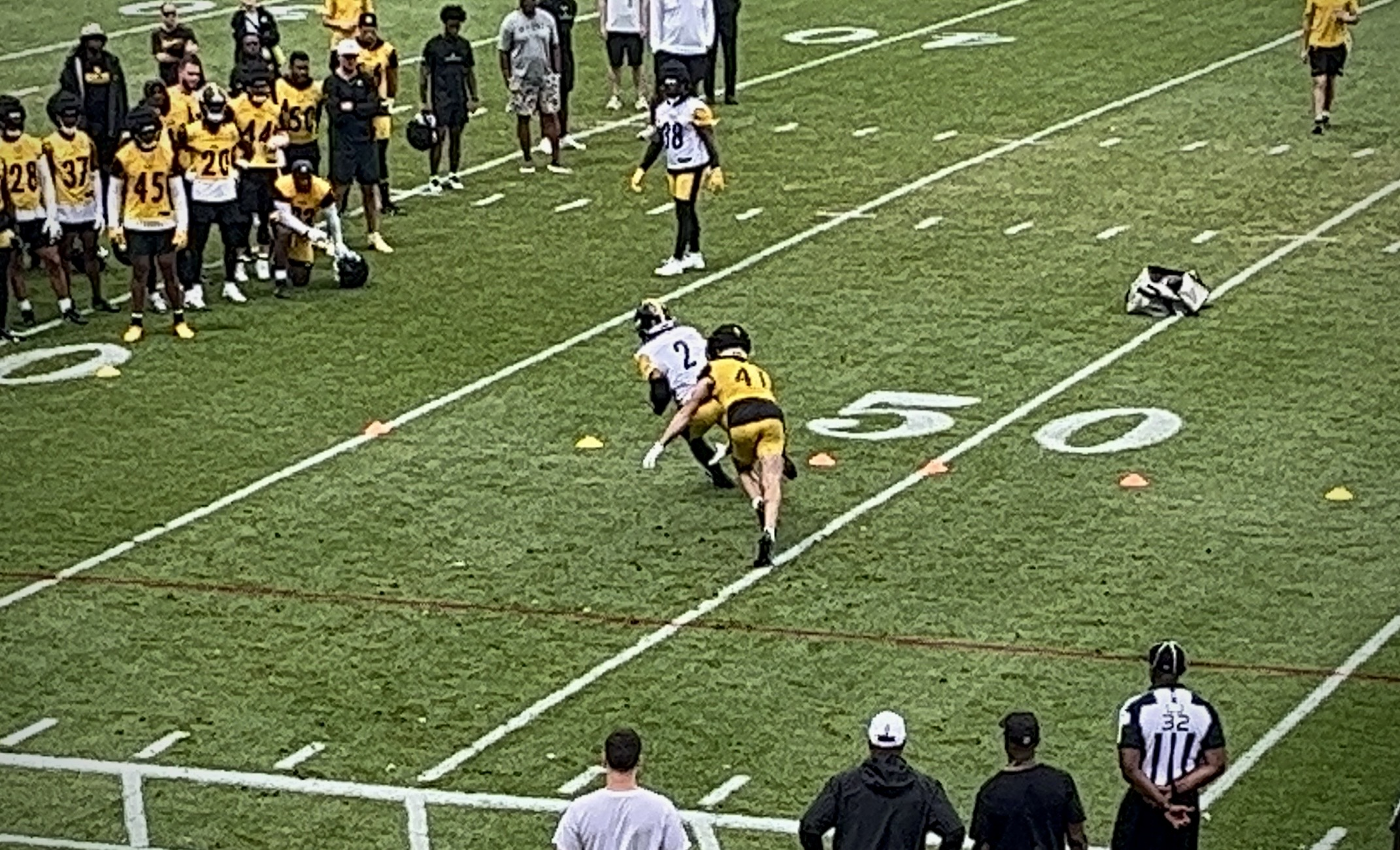
Wilson during a Steelers practice with Justin Fields in 2024

Ahead of the regular season, Wilson was named the team's second string left inside linebacker behind Patrick Queen, beating out Mark Robinson for the backup role.

On August 17, 2024, during a pre-season game against the Buffalo Bills, Wilson was tackled by Ryan Van Demark and his back leg was stepped up on and bent backwards. Despite this injury, he still made his first professional appearance in Week 1 against the Atlanta Falcons where he would make his first tackle on wide receiver Drake London. He would finish the game making three tackles in the 18–10 Steelers victory. By Week 6 of the season, Wilson had accumulated 18 tackles and eight assists, averaging 3.3 tackles a game. On October 13, he recorded his first tackle for loss during the Steelers' 32–13 victory over the Las Vegas Raiders. During the Steelers' 18–16 win over the Baltimore Ravens, Wilson intercepted a pass from Lamar Jackson intended for Justice Hill for his first career interception. He scored his first defensive touchdown in another divisional game, this time against the Bengals, when he returned a Joe Burrow fumble for 21 yards as the Steelers won 44–38. Wilson finished the regular season with 64 total tackles, one fumble recovery, a defensive touchdown, and an interception. The Steelers achieved a 10–7 record and clinched a playoff berth as the sixth seed.

He made his post-season debut in a 28–14 wild card loss to the Baltimore Ravens on January 11, 2025. During the game, Wilson made three solo tackles and three assisted tackles.

==== 2025 ====
Wilson made his first sack of the 2025 season during Week 2's loss to the Seattle Seahawks on quarterback Sam Darnold. He went on to record his second and final sack of the season during a Monday Night Football home victory over the Miami Dolphins, finishing the game with four total tackles (two solo, two assisted). Wilson made his second career interception when he picked off Colts quarterback Daniel Jones and returned it for 17 yards as the Steelers claimed a 27–20 home victory. In his sophomore campaign, Wilson played all 17 regular season games, recording 126 total tackles, two sacks, an interception and deflected two passes. The Steelers finished with a 10–7 record and won the AFC North for the first time in Wilson's professional career.

In Wilson's second postseason appearance, he recorded four tackles as the Steelers lost 30–6 to the Houston Texans in the AFC wild card round.

== NFL career statistics ==
Legend
**Bold**	Career high

=== Regular season ===
Year	Team	Games		Tackles					Interceptions						Fumbles				
Year	Team	GP	GS	Cmb	Solo	Ast	Sck	TFL	Int	Yds	Avg	Lng	TD	PD	FF	Fum	FR	Yds	TD
2024	PIT	17	4	78	49	29	0.0	3	**1**	0	0.0	0	0	**2**	**1**	**1**	**2**	**22**	**1**
2025	PIT	17	4	**126**	**74**	**52**	**2.0**	**6**	**1**	**17**	**17.0**	**17**	0	**2**	0	0	1	0	0
2026	PIT	5	5	44	23	21	1.0	**6**	0	0	0.0	0	0	**2**	0	0	1	0	0
Career		39	13	248	146	102	3.0	15	2	17	8.5	17	0	6	1	1	4	22	1

=== Postseason ===
Year	Team	Games		Tackles					Interceptions						Fumbles				
Year	Team	GP	GS	Cmb	Solo	Ast	Sck	TFL	Int	Yds	Avg	Lng	TD	PD	FF	Fum	FR	Yds	TD
2024	PIT	1	0	**6**	**3**	**3**	0.0	**1**	0	0	0.0	0	0	0	0	0	0	0	0
2025	PIT	1	0	4	2	2	0.0	0	0	0	0.0	0	0	**1**	0	0	0	0	0
Career		2	0	10	5	5	0.0	1	0	0	0.0	0	0	1	0	0	0	0	0

== Personal life ==
Wilson is the younger brother of Major League Baseball pitcher Bryse Wilson.

In December 2019, Wilson was arrested on charges related to consuming alcohol, and fleeing a police officer.

In December 2022, Wilson graduated from NC State with a B.S. degree in Applied Education Studies.

He married his wife, Lilah Ivey, in March 2025.
