= 2024 Pittsburgh Steelers season =

92nd season in franchise history

- Owner: The Rooney family
- General manager: Omar Khan
- Head coach: Mike Tomlin
- Offensive coordinator: Arthur Smith
- Defensive coordinator: Teryl Austin
- Home stadium: Acrisure Stadium

Results
- Record: 10–7
- Division place: 2nd AFC North
- Playoffs: Lost Wild Card Playoffs (at Ravens) 14–28
- All-Pros: DT Cameron Heyward (1st team); K Chris Boswell (1st team); OLB T. J. Watt (2nd team)
- Pro Bowlers: FS Minkah Fitzpatrick; DT Cameron Heyward; OLB T. J. Watt; K Chris Boswell; ST Miles Killebrew; G Isaac Seumalo; QB Russell Wilson; ILB Patrick Queen
- Team MVP: OLB T. J. Watt
- Team ROY: C Zach Frazier

Uniform
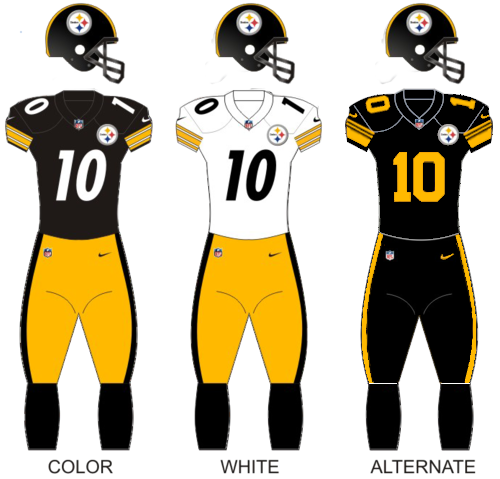

The 2024 season was the Pittsburgh Steelers' 92nd in the National Football League (NFL), their third under general manager Omar Khan and their 18th under head coach Mike Tomlin. After reaching their 10th win in Week 14, they matched their win total from last year. Despite losing to the instate rival Philadelphia Eagles in Week 15, the Steelers made the playoffs for the second consecutive season after losses by the Indianapolis Colts and the Miami Dolphins that same day. However, the Steelers had a late-season collapse by losing their last four games, resulting in them losing their lead in the AFC North and matching their 10–7 record from last year despite a 10–3 start. Their late-season woes continued into the playoffs where they were eliminated in the Wild Card round by the division rival Baltimore Ravens by a score of 28–14, resulting in the Steelers' sixth consecutive postseason appearance where they went one-and-done.

Upon defeating the Denver Broncos in week 2, the Steelers started 2–0 for the first time since 2020, while allowing their fewest points (16) over their first two games since 2007. The team meanwhile scored its fewest points (31) in a 2–0 start since 1936. In earning another win in week 3 over the Los Angeles Chargers and moving to 3–0, the Steelers held each of their first three opponents to 10 points or fewer for the first time since 1973. Following a week 13 victory against the division rival Cincinnati Bengals, the Steelers clinched their 21st consecutive non-losing season, to tie the official NFL record set by the Dallas Cowboys from 1965–85.

Oddly, the Steelers did not face any of their divisional rivals in the 2024 season until Week 11, a rarity for the NFL. The only non-divisional opponents the Steelers faced after Week 11 were the Philadelphia Eagles and Kansas City Chiefs, who later met in Super Bowl LIX.

== Draft ==
2024 Pittsburgh Steelers draft selections
Round	Selection	Player	Position	College	Notes
1	20	Troy Fautanu	OT	Washington	
2	51	Zach Frazier	C	West Virginia	
3	84	Roman Wilson	WR	Michigan	
3	98	Payton Wilson	LB	NC State	From Eagles (Note: The Steelers traded QB Kenny Pickett and a fourth-round selection (120th) to the Philadelphia Eagles in exchange for a third-round selection (98th overall) and two 2025 seventh-round selections.)
4	119	Mason McCormick	G	South Dakota State	
4	120	Traded to the Philadelphia Eagles			From Rams (Note: The Steelers traded a fifth-round selection (155th overall), a 2025 sixth-round selection and G Kevin Dotson to the Los Angeles Rams in exchange for a fourth-round selection (120th overall) and a 2025 fifth-round selection.)
5	155	Traded to the Los Angeles Rams			
6	178	Logan Lee	DE	Iowa	From Cardinals via Panthers (Note: Carolina traded a sixth-round selection (178th) and CB Donte Jackson to Pittsburgh in exchange for a seventh-round selection (240th) and WR Diontae Johnson.)
6	195	Ryan Watts	CB	Texas	
7	240	Traded to the Carolina Panthers			

2024 Pittsburgh Steelers undrafted free agents
Name	Position	College	Ref.
Beanie Bishop	CB	West Virginia	
Daijun Edwards	RB	Georgia	
John Rhys Plumlee	QB	UCF	
Julius Welschof	LB	Charlotte*	
Jacoby Windmon	LB	Michigan State	

* Signed from Germany as part of the International Player Pathway Program

Draft trades

== Staff ==
2024 Pittsburgh Steelers staff
Front office: Owner/president – Art Rooney II; Vice president – Art Rooney Jr.; Vice president of player personnel – Dan Rooney Jr.; General manager – Omar Khan; Assistant general manager – Andy Weidl; Director of player scouting – Mark Sadowski; Assistant director of player scouting – Max Gruder; Director of college scouting – Dan Colbert; Director of pro scouting – Sheldon White; Director of football administration – Cole Marcoux; Director of player development – Darrel Young; Head coaches: Head coach – Mike Tomlin; Offensive coaches: Offensive coordinator – Arthur Smith; Quarterbacks – Tom Arth; Running backs – Eddie Faulkner; Wide receivers – Zach Azzanni; Tight ends – Alfredo Roberts; Offensive line – Pat Meyer; Assistant offensive line – Isaac Williams; Senior offensive assistant – Mike Sullivan; Offensive assistant – Matt Baker; Offensive assistant – Mateo Kambui	Defensive coaches: Defensive coordinator – Teryl Austin; Defensive line – Karl Dunbar; Outside linebackers – Denzel Martin; Inside linebackers – Aaron Curry; Secondary – Grady Brown; Assistant secondary – Anthony Midget; Defensive quality control – Jason Brooks; Special teams coaches: Special teams coordinator – Danny Smith; Strength and conditioning: Head strength and conditioning – Phil Matusz; Assistant strength and conditioning – Justus Galac; Senior conditioning coordinator – Garrett Giemont; Sports science coordinator – Roderick Moore

== Final roster ==
2024 Pittsburgh Steelers roster
Quarterbacks (QB): 4 Kyle Allen; 2 Justin Fields; 3 Russell Wilson; Running backs (RB): 22 Najee Harris; 84 Cordarrelle Patterson; 30 Jaylen Warren; Wide receivers (WR): 19 Calvin Austin; 11 Van Jefferson; 14 George Pickens; 15 Ben Skowronek; 18 Mike Williams; Tight ends (TE): 88 Pat Freiermuth; 83 Connor Heyward; 81 MyCole Pruitt; 80 Darnell Washington	Offensive linemen (OL): 67 Calvin Anderson RT; 74 Spencer Anderson LG; 54 Zach Frazier C; 77 Broderick Jones RT; 62 Ryan McCollum C; 66 Mason McCormick RG; 65 Dan Moore LT; 64 Max Scharping RG; 73 Isaac Seumalo LG; Defensive linemen (DL): 57 Montravius Adams DT; 95 Keeanu Benton NT; 97 Cameron Heyward DT; 92 Isaiahh Loudermilk DT; 94 Dean Lowry DT; 99 Larry Ogunjobi DT	Linebackers (LB): 51 Nick Herbig OLB; 56 Alex Highsmith OLB; 44 Tyler Matakevich ILB; 49 Jeremiah Moon OLB; 6 Patrick Queen ILB; 50 Elandon Roberts ILB; 93 Mark Robinson ILB; 91 Preston Smith OLB; 90 T. J. Watt OLB; 41 Payton Wilson ILB; Defensive backs (DB): 31 Beanie Bishop CB; 25 DeShon Elliott SS; 39 Minkah Fitzpatrick FS; 26 Donte Jackson CB; 23 Damontae Kazee FS; 28 Miles Killebrew FS; 42 James Pierre CB; 24 Joey Porter Jr. CB; 20 Cameron Sutton CB; 27 Cory Trice CB; Special teams (ST): 9 Chris Boswell K; 46 Christian Kuntz LS; 8 Corliss Waitman P	Practice squad: 17 Jamal Agnew WR; 60 Dylan Cook LT; 96 Breiden Fehoko DT; 34 Zyon Gilbert CB (PS/I); 40 Devin Harper ILB; 5 D'Shawn Jamison CB; 89 Brandon Johnson WR; 68 John Leglue G; 53 Eku Leota OLB; 13 Scotty Miller WR; 72 Doug Nester G; 37 Eric Rowe SS; 33 Aaron Shampklin RB; 79 Jacob Slade DT; 85 Matt Sokol TE; 35 Jonathan Ward RB; 16 Quez Watkins WR; 45 Julius Welschof LB; Reserve: 78 James Daniels G (IR); 76 Troy Fautanu LT (IR); 21 C. J. Henderson CB (IR); 71 Nate Herbig G (IR); 55 Cole Holcomb ILB (PUP); -- Cameron Johnston P (IR); 98 DeMarvin Leal DE (IR); 61 Logan Lee DT (IR/DFR); 29 Ryan Watts CB (IR); 10 Roman Wilson WR (IR/DFR); Rookies in italics 53 active, 22 reserve, 13 practice squad (1 exempt)

== Preseason ==
Week	Date	Opponent	Result	Record	Venue	Recap
1	August 9	Houston Texans	L 12–20	0–1	Acrisure Stadium	Recap
2	August 17	Buffalo Bills	L 3–9	0–2	Acrisure Stadium	Recap
3	August 24	at Detroit Lions	L 17–24	0–3	Ford Field	Recap

== Regular season ==
=== Schedule ===
Week	Date	Opponent	Result	Record	Venue	Recap
1	September 8	at Atlanta Falcons	**W** 18–10	1–0	Mercedes-Benz Stadium	Recap
2	September 15	at Denver Broncos	**W** 13–6	2–0	Empower Field at Mile High	Recap
3	September 22	Los Angeles Chargers	**W** 20–10	3–0	Acrisure Stadium	Recap
4	September 29	at Indianapolis Colts	**L** 24–27	3–1	Lucas Oil Stadium	Recap
5	October 6	Dallas Cowboys	**L** 17–20	3–2	Acrisure Stadium	Recap
6	October 13	at Las Vegas Raiders	**W** 32–13	4–2	Allegiant Stadium	Recap
7	October 20	New York Jets	**W** 37–15	5–2	Acrisure Stadium	Recap
8	October 28	New York Giants	**W** 26–18	6–2	Acrisure Stadium	Recap
9	Bye					
10	November 10	at Washington Commanders	**W** 28–27	7–2	Northwest Stadium	Recap
11	November 17	**Baltimore Ravens**	**W** 18–16	8–2	Acrisure Stadium	Recap
12	November 21	at **Cleveland Browns**	**L** 19–24	8–3	Huntington Bank Field	Recap
13	December 1	at **Cincinnati Bengals**	**W** 44–38	9–3	Paycor Stadium	Recap
14	December 8	**Cleveland Browns**	**W** 27–14	10–3	Acrisure Stadium	Recap
15	December 15	at Philadelphia Eagles	**L** 13–27	10–4	Lincoln Financial Field	Recap
16	December 21	at **Baltimore Ravens**	**L** 17–34	10–5	M&T Bank Stadium	Recap
17	December 25	Kansas City Chiefs	**L** 10–29	10–6	Acrisure Stadium	Recap
18	January 4	**Cincinnati Bengals**	**L** 17–19	10–7	Acrisure Stadium	Recap

Note: Intra-division opponents are in bold text.

=== Game summaries ===
==== Week 1: at Atlanta Falcons ====
Week 1: Pittsburgh Steelers at Atlanta Falcons – game summary

Quarter	1	2	3	4	Total
**Steelers**	3	6	6	3	**18**
Falcons	3	7	0	0	**10**

at Mercedes-Benz Stadium, Atlanta, Georgia

- Date: September 8
- Game time: 1:00 p.m. EDT
- Game weather: None (retractable roof closed)
- Game attendance: 72,291
- Referee: Brad Rogers
- TV announcers (Fox): Joe Davis, Greg Olsen and Pam Oliver
- Recap, Game Book

Game information

**First quarter**

- ATL – Younghoe Koo 24-yard field goal, 9:06. Falcons 3–0. **Drive: 12 plays, 64 yards, 5:54.**
- PIT – Chris Boswell 57-yard field goal, 4:37. Tied 3–3. **Drive: 10 plays, 31 yards, 4:29.**

**Second quarter**

- PIT – Chris Boswell 51-yard field goal, 12:54. Steelers 6–3. **Drive: 10 plays, 18 yards, 6:08.**
- ATL – Kyle Pitts 12-yard pass from Kirk Cousins (Younghoe Koo kick), 0:32. Falcons 10–6. **Drive: 9 plays, 90 yards, 3:18.**
- PIT – Chris Boswell 44-yard field goal, 0:00. Falcons 10–9. **Drive: 4 plays, 45 yards, 0:32.**

**Third quarter**

- PIT – Chris Boswell 56-yard field goal, 7:45. Steelers 12–10. **Drive: 9 plays, 24 yards, 2:44.**
- PIT – Chris Boswell 40-yard field goal, 0:25. Steelers 15–10. **Drive: 5 plays, 46 yards, 3:24.**

**Fourth quarter**

- PIT – Chris Boswell 25-yard field goal, 0:28. Steelers 18–10. **Drive: 7 plays, 11 yards, 2:06.**

**Top passers**

- PIT – Justin Fields – 17/23, 156 yards
- ATL – Kirk Cousins – 16/26, 155 yards, TD, 2 INT

**Top rushers**

- PIT – Najee Harris – 20 rushes, 70 yards
- ATL – Bijan Robinson – 18 rushes, 68 yards

**Top receivers**

- PIT – George Pickens – 6 receptions, 85 yards
- ATL – Ray-Ray McCloud – 4 receptions, 52 yards

The Steelers started their regular season on the road against the Falcons. In the first quarter, the Falcons scored first when Younghoe Koo kicked a 24-yard field goal to make it 3–0. The Steelers tied it up at 3–3 when Chris Boswell kicked a 57-yard field goal. In the second quarter, the Steelers took a 6–3 lead when Boswell kicked a 51-yard field goal. The Falcons retook the lead when Kirk Cousins found Kyle Pitts on a 12-yard touchdown pass to make it 10–6. The Steelers then made it 10–9 at halftime when Boswell kicked his third field goal of the game: from 44 yards out. In the second half, it was all Steelers when Boswell kicked 3 more field goals well into the fourth quarter (from 56, 40, and 25 yards out) to make the final score 18–10.

With the upset win, the Steelers started their season 1–0.

==== Week 2: at Denver Broncos ====
Week 2: Pittsburgh Steelers at Denver Broncos – game summary

Quarter	1	2	3	4	Total
**Steelers**	7	3	3	0	**13**
Broncos	0	0	0	6	**6**

at Empower Field at Mile High, Denver, Colorado

- Date: September 15
- Game time: 4:25 p.m. EDT/2:25 p.m. MDT
- Game weather: Partly cloudy, 88 °F (31 °C)
- Game attendance: 74,215
- Referee: Clete Blakeman
- TV announcers (CBS): Spero Dedes, Adam Archuleta and Aditi Kinkhabwala
- Recap, Game Book

Game information

**First quarter**

- PIT – Darnell Washington 5-yard pass from Justin Fields (Chris Boswell kick), 1:56. Steelers 7–0. **Drive: 12 plays, 78 yards, 7:34.**

**Second quarter**

- PIT – Chris Boswell 22-yard field goal, 0:00. Steelers 10–0. **Drive: 7 plays, 57 yards, 2:28.**

**Third quarter**

- PIT – Chris Boswell 53-yard field goal, 4:16. Steelers 13–0. **Drive: 4 plays, 45 yards, 1:54.**

**Fourth quarter**

- DEN – Wil Lutz 35-yard field goal, 10:42. Steelers 13–3. **Drive: 12 plays, 54 yards, 5:33.**
- DEN – Wil Lutz 29-yard field goal, 1:53. Steelers 13–6. **Drive: 9 plays, 69 yards, 2:51.**

**Top passers**

- PIT – Justin Fields – 13/20, 117 yards, TD
- DEN – Bo Nix – 20/35, 246 yards, 2 INT

**Top rushers**

- PIT – Najee Harris – 17 rushes, 69 yards
- DEN – Bo Nix – 4 rushes, 25 yards

**Top receivers**

- PIT – Pat Freiermuth – 4 receptions, 39 yards
- DEN – Josh Reynolds – 4 receptions, 93 yards

After winning on the road, the Steelers traveled northwest to Denver to take on the Broncos. The Steelers took a 13–0 lead after the first three quarters. The Broncos got on the board with Wil Lutz's two field goals (from 35 and 29 yards out) to make it 13–6. Damonte Kazee would come up with the game-winning interception with less than 10 seconds to go, sealing another Steelers victory.

With the win, the Steelers improved to 2–0.

==== Week 3: vs. Los Angeles Chargers ====
Week 3: Los Angeles Chargers at Pittsburgh Steelers – game summary

Quarter	1	2	3	4	Total
Chargers	7	3	0	0	**10**
**Steelers**	0	7	3	10	**20**

at Acrisure Stadium, Pittsburgh, Pennsylvania

- Date: September 22
- Game time: 1:00 p.m. EDT
- Game weather: Partly cloudy, 78 °F (26 °C)
- Game attendance: 66,734
- Referee: Alex Kemp
- TV announcers (CBS): Jim Nantz, Tony Romo and Tracy Wolfson
- Recap, Game Book

Game information

**First quarter**

- LAC – Quentin Johnston 27-yard pass from Justin Herbert (Cameron Dicker kick), 2:46. Chargers 7–0. **Drive: 5 plays, 59 yards, 2:48.**

**Second quarter**

- PIT – Justin Fields 5-yard run (Chris Boswell kick), 10:17. Tied 7–7. **Drive: 13 plays, 70 yards, 7:29.**
- LAC – Cameron Dicker 28-yard field goal, 3:13. Chargers 10–7. **Drive: 12 plays, 60 yards, 7:04.**

**Third quarter**

- PIT – Chris Boswell 38-yard field goal, 9:05. Tied 10–10. **Drive: 12 plays, 50 yards, 5:55.**

**Fourth quarter**

- PIT – Chris Boswell 30-yard field goal, 14:14. Steelers 13–10. **Drive: 12 plays, 73 yards, 6:26.**
- PIT – Calvin Austin 55-yard pass from Justin Fields (Chris Boswell kick), 7:02. Steelers 20–10. **Drive: 5 plays, 84 yards, 2:43.**

**Top passers**

- LAC – Justin Herbert – 12/18, 125 yards, TD
- PIT – Justin Fields – 25/32, 245 yards, TD, INT

**Top rushers**

- LAC – J. K. Dobbins – 15 rushes, 44 yards
- PIT – Najee Harris – 18 rushes, 70 yards

**Top receivers**

- LAC – Quentin Johnston – 2 receptions, 44 yards, TD
- PIT – Calvin Austin – 4 receptions, 95 yards, TD

After another road win, the Steelers went home for their opener against the Chargers. In the first quarter, the Chargers took the lead when Justin Herbert connected with Quentin Johnson on a 27-yard touchdown pass to make it 7–0. The Steelers tied it up 7–7 in the second quarter when Justin Fields ran for a 5-yard touchdown. The Chargers retook the lead 10–7 before halftime when Cameron Dicker kicked a 28-yard field goal. In the second half, the Steelers would score the remaining 13 points to seal another victory, winning 20–10.

With the win, the Steelers improved to 3–0. They started 3–0 for the first time since 2020.

==== Week 4: at Indianapolis Colts ====
Week 4: Pittsburgh Steelers at Indianapolis Colts – game summary

Quarter	1	2	3	4	Total
Steelers	0	3	7	14	**24**
**Colts**	14	3	0	10	**27**

at Lucas Oil Stadium, Indianapolis, Indiana

- Date: September 29
- Game time: 1:00 p.m. EDT
- Game weather: None (retractable roof closed)
- Game attendance: 66,376
- Referee: Land Clark
- TV announcers (CBS): Spero Dedes, Adam Archuleta and Aditi Kinkhabwala
- Recap, Game Book

Game information

**First quarter**

- IND – Jonathan Taylor 2-yard run (Matt Gay kick), 12:02. Colts 7–0. **Drive: 8 plays, 70 yards, 2:59.**
- IND – Josh Downs 4-yard pass from Joe Flacco (Matt Gay kick), 2:34. Colts 14–0. **Drive: 9 plays, 86 yards, 4:45.**

**Second quarter**

- IND – Matt Gay 33-yard field goal, 12:31. Colts 17–0. **Drive: 9 plays, 25 yards, 2:57.**
- PIT – Chris Boswell 50-yard field goal, 0:00. Colts 17–3. **Drive: 8 plays, 44 yards, 1:14.**

**Third quarter**

- PIT – Justin Fields 5-yard run (Chris Boswell kick), 2:53. Colts 17–10. **Drive: 6 plays, 56 yards, 2:56.**

**Fourth quarter**

- IND – Drew Ogletree 15-yard pass from Joe Flacco (Matt Gay kick), 14:43. Colts 24–10. **Drive: 10 plays, 70 yards, 3:10.**
- PIT – Justin Fields 2-yard run (Chris Boswell kick), 11:23. Colts 24–17. **Drive: 8 plays, 70 yards, 3:20.**
- IND – Matt Gay 35-yard field goal, 6:03. Colts 27–17. **Drive: 10 plays, 54 yards, 5:20.**
- PIT – Pat Freiermuth 8-yard pass from Justin Fields (Chris Boswell kick), 3:40. Colts 27–24. **Drive: 7 plays, 70 yards, 2:23.**

**Top passers**

- PIT – Justin Fields – 22/34, 312 yards, TD
- IND – Joe Flacco – 16/26, 168 yards, 2 TD

**Top rushers**

- PIT – Justin Fields – 10 rushes, 55 yards, 2 TD
- IND – Jonathan Taylor – 21 rushes, 88 yards, TD

**Top receivers**

- PIT – George Pickens – 7 receptions, 113 yards
- IND – Michael Pittman Jr. – 6 receptions, 113 yards

The Steelers traveled to Indianapolis to take on the Colts. The Colts took a 17–0 lead well into the second quarter before Chris Boswell got the Steelers on the board before halftime 17–3 by way of a 50-yard field goal. In the third quarter, the Steelers came within a touchdown by way of Justin Fields 5-yard run to make it 17–10 for the only score of the period. The Colts moved up by a couple touchdowns in the fourth when Joe Flacco (in relief of Anthony Richardson) found Drew Ogletree for a 15-yard touchdown to make it 24–10. The lead would be shortened again when Fields ran for another touchdown from 2 yards out to make it 24–17. Matt Gay put the Colts up 27–17 by way of a 35-yard field goal. The Steelers then drew closer when Fields found Pat Freiermuth on an 8-yard touchdown pass to make the final score 27–24. Unfortunately, they couldn't come back and suffered their first loss of the season, and the Steelers could not succeed at avenging their loss to the Colts from the previous season.

With the loss, the Steelers fell to 3–1.

==== Week 5: vs. Dallas Cowboys ====
Week 5: Dallas Cowboys at Pittsburgh Steelers – game summary

Quarter	1	2	3	4	Total
**Cowboys**	3	3	0	14	**20**
Steelers	3	0	7	7	**17**

at Acrisure Stadium, Pittsburgh, Pennsylvania

- Date: October 6
- Game time: 9:45 p.m. EDT (Note: The game was initially scheduled for 8:20 p.m., but was postponed to 9:45 p.m. due to thunderstorms.)
- Game weather: Cloudy, 67 °F (19 °C)
- Game attendance: 67,380
- Referee: Shawn Hochuli
- TV announcers (NBC): Mike Tirico, Cris Collinsworth and Melissa Stark
- Recap, Game Book

Game information

**First quarter**

- DAL – Brandon Aubrey 55-yard field goal, 12:35. Cowboys 3–0. **Drive: 6 plays, 21 yards, 2:25.**
- PIT – Chris Boswell 41-yard field goal, 7:33. Tied 3–3. **Drive: 11 plays, 52 yards, 5:02.**

**Second quarter**

- DAL – Brandon Aubrey 33-yard field goal, 8:51. Cowboys 6–3. **Drive: 8 plays, 51 yards, 3:29.**

**Third quarter**

- PIT – Connor Heyward 16-yard pass from Justin Fields (Chris Boswell kick), 11:50. Steelers 10–6. **Drive: 6 plays, 72 yards, 3:10.**

**Fourth quarter**

- DAL – Rico Dowdle 22-yard pass from Dak Prescott (Brandon Aubrey kick), 13:51. Cowboys 13–10. **Drive: 16 plays, 90 yards, 8:32.**
- PIT – Pat Freiermuth 6-yard pass from Justin Fields (Chris Boswell kick), 4:56. Steelers 17–13. **Drive: 12 plays, 63 yards, 5:32.**
- DAL – Jalen Tolbert 4-yard pass from Dak Prescott (Brandon Aubrey kick), 0:20. Cowboys 20–17. **Drive: 15 plays, 70 yards, 4:36.**

**Top passers**

- DAL – Dak Prescott – 29/42, 352 yards, 2 TD, 2 INT
- PIT – Justin Fields – 14/26, 138 yards, 2 TD

**Top rushers**

- DAL – Rico Dowdle – 20 rushes, 87 yards
- PIT – Najee Harris – 14 rushes, 42 yards

**Top receivers**

- DAL – Jalen Tolbert – 7 receptions, 87 yards, TD
- PIT – Najee Harris – 2 receptions, 35 yards

After a tough road loss, the Steelers headed home for a Sunday Night football game against the Cowboys. In the first quarter, the Cowboys scored first when Brandon Aubrey kicked a 55-yard field goal to make 3–0. The Steelers then tied the game up at 3–3 when Chris Boswell kicked a 41-yard field goal. The Cowboys then moved back into the lead in the second quarter with a 33-yard field goal from Aubrey to make it 6–3 at halftime. In the third quarter, the Steelers took the lead when Justin Fields found Connor Heyward on a 16-yard touchdown pass to make the score 10–6 for the only score of the period. In the fourth, the Cowboys retook the lead 13–10 by way of Dak Prescott connecting with Rico Dowdle on a 22-yard touchdown pass. Fields connected with Pat Freiermuth on a 6-yard touchdown pass to make it 17–13 in favor of the Steelers retaking the lead. However, the Cowboys were able to complete the comeback and win 20–17 by way of Prescott's 4-yard touchdown pass to Jalen Tolbert with 20 seconds left, handing the Steelers their second straight loss.

With the loss, the Steelers fell to 3–2.

==== Week 6: at Las Vegas Raiders ====
Week 6: Pittsburgh Steelers at Las Vegas Raiders – game summary

Quarter	1	2	3	4	Total
**Steelers**	3	9	10	10	**32**
Raiders	7	0	0	6	**13**

at Allegiant Stadium, Paradise, Nevada

- Date: October 13
- Game time: 4:05 p.m. EDT/1:05 p.m. PDT
- Game weather: None (indoor stadium)
- Game attendance: 62,553
- Referee: Alan Eck
- TV announcers (CBS): Ian Eagle, Charles Davis, and Evan Washburn
- Recap, Game Book

Game information

**First quarter**

- PIT – Chris Boswell 52-yard field goal, 10:19. Steelers 3–0. **Drive: 9 plays, 37 yards, 4:41.**
- LV – Alexander Mattison 3-yard run (Daniel Carlson kick), 4:24. Raiders 7–3. **Drive: 10 plays, 70 yards, 5:55.**

**Second quarter**

- PIT – Chris Boswell 49-yard field goal, 12:12. Raiders 7–6. **Drive: 10 plays, 43 yards, 4:00.**
- PIT – Justin Fields 3-yard run (pass failed), 0:34. Steelers 12–7. **Drive: 6 plays, 30 yards, 1:58.**

**Third quarter**

- PIT – Chris Boswell 37-yard field goal, 9:20. Steelers 15–7. **Drive: 4 plays, −10 yards, 1:38.**
- PIT – Najee Harris 36-yard run (Chris Boswell kick), 4:21. Steelers 22–7. **Drive: 7 plays, 80 yards, 3:19.**

**Fourth quarter**

- PIT – Justin Fields 7-yard run (Chris Boswell kick), 8:16. Steelers 29–7. **Drive: 1 play, 7 yards, 0:05.**
- LV – Kristian Wilkerson 9-yard pass from Aidan O'Connell (pass failed), 4:54. Steelers 29–13. **Drive: 10 plays, 70 yards, 3:22.**
- PIT – Chris Boswell 36-yard field goal, 3:55. Steelers 32–13. **Drive: 6 plays, 18 yards, 0:59.**

**Top passers**

- PIT – Justin Fields – 14/24, 145 yards
- LV – Aidan O'Connell – 27/40, 227 yards, TD, INT

**Top rushers**

- PIT – Najee Harris – 14 rushes, 106 yards, TD
- LV – Alexander Mattison – 14 rushes, 33 yards, TD

**Top receivers**

- PIT – George Pickens – 3 receptions, 53 yards
- LV – Brock Bowers – 9 receptions, 71 yards

After a tough loss at home, the Steelers traveled to Las Vegas to take on the Raiders. In the first quarter, the Steelers scored first, making it 3–0 by way of Chris Boswell's 52-yard field goal. Alexander Mattison gave the Raiders the lead with a 3-yard touchdown run to make it 7–3. From the second quarter into the fourth, the Steelers scored 26 consecutive points and lead 29–7. The Raiders then ended the streak when Aiden O'Connell found Kristian Williams (with a failed two-point conversion) to make it 29–13. Boswell then wrapped up the scoring of the game with a 36-yard field goal for the Steelers to win 32–13.

With the win, the Steelers improved to 4–2.

==== Week 7: vs. New York Jets ====
Week 7: New York Jets at Pittsburgh Steelers – game summary

Quarter	1	2	3	4	Total
Jets	7	8	0	0	**15**
**Steelers**	3	10	10	14	**37**

at Acrisure Stadium, Pittsburgh, Pennsylvania

- Date: October 20
- Game time: 8:20 p.m. EDT
- Game weather: Clear, 60 °F (16 °C)
- Game attendance: 66,956
- Referee: Shawn Smith
- TV announcers (NBC): Mike Tirico, Cris Collinsworth and Melissa Stark
- Recap, Game Book

Game information

**First quarter**

- PIT – Chris Boswell 46-yard field goal, 11:33. Steelers 3–0. **Drive: 7 plays, 42 yards, 3:27.**
- NYJ – Breece Hall 13-yard run (Greg Zuerlein kick), 2:27. Jets 7–3. **Drive: 9 plays, 82 yards, 5:41.**

**Second quarter**

- PIT – Chris Boswell 29-yard field goal, 8:20. Jets 7–6. **Drive: 9 plays, 58 yards, 4:25.**
- NYJ – Tyler Conklin 1-yard pass from Aaron Rodgers (Aaron Rodgers–Garrett Wilson pass), 5:29. Jets 15–6. **Drive: 6 plays, 72 yards, 2:51.**
- PIT – George Pickens 11-yard pass from Russell Wilson (Chris Boswell kick), 0:27. Jets 15–13. **Drive: 4 plays, 54 yards, 0:48.**

**Third quarter**

- PIT – Chris Boswell 21-yard field goal, 7:49. Steelers 16–15. **Drive: 11 plays, 76 yards, 4:52.**
- PIT – Russell Wilson 1-yard run (Chris Boswell kick), 7:15. Steelers 23–15. **Drive: 1 play, 1 yard, 0:07.**

**Fourth quarter**

- PIT – Van Jefferson 4-yard pass from Russell Wilson (Chris Boswell kick), 12:09. Steelers 30–15. **Drive: 11 plays, 75 yards, 5:28.**
- PIT – Najee Harris 10-yard run (Chris Boswell kick), 0:26. Steelers 37–15. **Drive: 13 plays, 75 yards, 7:27.**

**Top passers**

- NYJ – Aaron Rodgers – 24/39, 276 yards, TD, 2 INT
- PIT – Russell Wilson – 16/29, 264 yards, 2 TD

**Top rushers**

- NYJ – Breece Hall – 12 rushes, 38 yards, TD
- PIT – Najee Harris – 21 rushes, 102 yards, TD

**Top receivers**

- NYJ – Breece Hall – 6 receptions, 103 yards
- PIT – George Pickens – 5 receptions, 111 yards, TD

After a huge win on the road, the Steelers returned home for a Sunday Night duel against the Jets. This game was notable as being the very first start for Russell Wilson as the Steelers' starting QB. They would score first when Chris Boswell kicked a 46-yard field goal to make it 3–0. Later on, Breece Hall ran for a 13-yard touchdown to give the Jets a 7–3 lead. In the second quarter, the Steelers then shortened their deficit to a point when Boswell kicked a 29-yard field goal to make it 7–6. Aaron Rodgers found Tyler Conklin on a 1-yard touchdown pass (with a successful two-point conversion) to help the Jets retake the lead 15–6. The Steelers started a streak of 31 consecutive points to win the game 37–15.

With the win, the Steelers improved to 5–2 and into a tie for first with the Ravens in the AFC North.

==== Week 8: vs. New York Giants ====
Week 8: New York Giants at Pittsburgh Steelers – game summary

Quarter	1	2	3	4	Total
Giants	3	6	0	9	**18**
**Steelers**	6	3	7	10	**26**

at Acrisure Stadium, Pittsburgh, Pennsylvania

- Date: October 28
- Game time: 8:15 p.m. EDT
- Game weather: Clear, 54 °F (12 °C)
- Game attendance: 66,637
- Referee: Scott Novak
- TV announcers (ESPN/ABC): Joe Buck, Troy Aikman, and Lisa Salters
- Recap, Game Book

Game information

**First quarter**

- PIT – Chris Boswell 31-yard field goal, 10:19. Steelers 3–0. **Drive: 10 plays, 57 yards, 4:41.**
- NYG – Greg Joseph 29-yard field goal, 5:19. Tied 3–3. **Drive: 8 plays, 59 yards, 5:00.**
- PIT – Chris Boswell 25-yard field goal, 3:05. Steelers 6–3. **Drive: 7 plays, 63 yards, 2:14.**

**Second quarter**

- NYG – Greg Joseph 39-yard field goal, 12:39. Tied 6–6. **Drive: 12 plays, 45 yards, 5:26.**
- PIT – Chris Boswell 27-yard field goal, 8:12. Steelers 9–6. **Drive: 12 plays, 61 yards, 4:27.**
- NYG – Greg Joseph 44-yard field goal, 0:21. Tied 9–9. **Drive: 8 plays, 57 yards, 1:32.**

**Third quarter**

- PIT – Calvin Austin 73-yard punt return (Chris Boswell kick), 4:38. Steelers 16–9.

**Fourth quarter**

- PIT – Calvin Austin 29-yard pass from Russell Wilson (Chris Boswell kick), 13:16. Steelers 23–9. **Drive: 9 plays, 80 yards, 4:12.**
- NYG – Tyrone Tracy Jr. 45-yard run (pass failed), 11:07. Steelers 23–15. **Drive: 5 plays, 55 yards, 2:09.**
- PIT – Chris Boswell 27-yard field goal, 7:15. Steelers 26–15. **Drive: 7 plays, 61 yards, 3:52.**
- NYG – Greg Joseph 48-yard field goal, 5:06. Steelers 26–18. **Drive: 8 plays, 40 yards, 2:09.**

**Top passers**

- NYG – Daniel Jones – 24/38, 264 yards, INT
- PIT – Russell Wilson – 20/28, 278 yards, TD

**Top rushers**

- NYG – Tyrone Tracy Jr. – 20 rushes, 145 yards, TD
- PIT – Najee Harris – 19 rushes, 114 yards

**Top receivers**

- NYG – Darius Slayton – 4 receptions, 108 yards
- PIT – George Pickens – 4 receptions, 74 yards

After a huge win at home, the Steelers stayed home for a Monday Night Football duel against the Giants. With both teams failing to find the end zone in the first half, the Steelers scored first when Chris Bosweel kicked a 31-yard field goal to make it 3–0. The Giants then tied it at 3–3 when Greg Joseph kicked a 29-yard field goal. The Steelers responded with Boswell's 25-yard field goal to retake the lead 6–3. In the second quarter, the Giants tied the game back up at 6–6 when Joseph made a field goal from 39 yards out. The Steelers moved back into the lead 9–6 when Boswell kicked a 27-yard field goal. The Giants then tied the game at 9–9 during halftime when Joseph kicked a 44-yard field goal. In the third quarter, the Steelers finally found the end zone when Calvin Austin III returned a punt 73 yards for a touchdown making the score 16–9. In the fourth quarter, Russell Wilson connected with Austin III for a 29-yard touchdown pass to make it 23–9. The Giants then found the end zone when Tyron Tracy Jr. ran for a 45-yard touchdown (with a failed two-point conversion) to make it 23–15. Boswell moved the Steelers up by double digits again 26–15, when he kicked another 27-yard field goal. The Giants then made it 26–18 when Joseph kicked a 48-yard field goal. Getting the ball back later on in the quarter, Daniel Jones would be intercepted by Beanie Bishop Jr. to seal yet another victory for the Steelers.

With the win, the Steelers went into their bye week at 6–2. With the Ravens' loss to the Browns the previous day, they are now back to sole possession of first place in the AFC North.

==== Week 10: at Washington Commanders ====
Week 10: Pittsburgh Steelers at Washington Commanders – game summary

Quarter	1	2	3	4	Total
**Steelers**	7	7	7	7	**28**
Commanders	7	10	10	0	**27**

at Northwest Stadium, Landover, Maryland

- Date: November 10
- Game time: 1:00 p.m. EST
- Game weather: Cloudy, 57 °F (14 °C)
- Game attendance: 66,192
- Referee: Brad Rogers
- TV announcers (CBS): Ian Eagle, Charles Davis and Evan Washburn
- Recap, Game Book

Game information

**First quarter**

- PIT – George Pickens 16-yard pass from Russell Wilson (Chris Boswell kick), 8:33. Steelers 7–0. **Drive: 7 plays, 70 yards, 2:52.**
- WAS – Austin Ekeler 1-yard run (Zane Gonzalez kick), 3:44. Tied 7–7. **Drive: 3 plays, 15 yards, 1:32.**

**Second quarter**

- PIT – Pat Freiermuth 3-yard pass from Russell Wilson (Chris Boswell kick), 10:28. Steelers 14–7. **Drive: 5 plays, 14 yards, 2:23.**
- WAS – Zane Gonzalez 48-yard field goal, 8:11. Steelers 14–10. **Drive: 6 plays, 40 yards, 2:17.**
- WAS – Austin Ekeler 1-yard run (Zane Gonzalez kick), 0:16. Commanders 17–14. **Drive: 15 plays, 94 yards, 5:23.**

**Third quarter**

- WAS – Jeremy McNichols 1-yard run (Zane Gonzalez kick), 12:55. Commanders 24–14. **Drive: 5 plays, 71 yards, 2:05.**
- PIT – Najee Harris 1-yard run (Chris Boswell kick), 8:06. Commanders 24–21. **Drive: 9 plays, 75 yards, 4:49.**
- WAS – Zane Gonzalez 41-yard field goal, 2:51. Commanders 27–21. **Drive: 7 plays, 19 yards, 2:51.**

**Fourth quarter**

- PIT – Mike Williams 32-yard pass from Russell Wilson (Chris Boswell kick), 2:22. Steelers 28–27. **Drive: 6 plays, 46 yards, 3:24.**

**Top passers**

- PIT – Russell Wilson – 14/28, 195 yards, 3 TD, INT
- WAS – Jayden Daniels – 17/34, 202 yards

**Top rushers**

- PIT – Jaylen Warren – 14 rushes, 66 yards
- WAS – Austin Ekeler – 13 rushes, 44 yards, 2 TD

**Top receivers**

- PIT – George Pickens – 5 receptions, 91 yards, TD
- WAS – Terry McLaurin – 5 receptions, 113 yards

Coming off the bye week, the Steelers traveled east to take on the Commanders. In the first quarter, they would score first, making it 7–0 by way of Russell Wilson connecting with George Pickens on a 16-yard touchdown pass. The Commanders then tied it up at 7–7 when Austin Ekeler ran for a 1-yard touchdown. The Steelers retook the lead in the second when Wilson connected with Pat Freiermuth on a 3-yard touchdown pass to make it 14–7. The Commanders however were able to take a 17–14 halftime lead by way of Zane Gonzalez's 48-yard field goal, followed by Ekeler running for another 1-yard touchdown. After the break, the Commanders went back to work in the third when Jeremy McNichols ran for a 1-yard touchdown to make the score 24–14. Though, the Steelers came within single digits again when Najee Harris ran for a 1-yard touchdown to make it 24–21. Gonzalez kicked his second field goal from 41 yards out to put the Commanders up 27–21. In the fourth quarter, the Steelers scored the only points when Wilson found Mike Williams on a 32-yard touchdown pass to make the score 28–27. They were then able to hold off the Commanders and eventually run out the clock to seal the victory.

With the win, the Steelers improved to 7–2 and took the lead in the AFC North by half a game. They also kept their winning streak in Washington alive, not having lost there since 1988 when the Commanders were known as the Washington Redskins.

==== Week 11: vs. Baltimore Ravens ====
Week 11: Baltimore Ravens at Pittsburgh Steelers – game summary

Quarter	1	2	3	4	Total
Ravens	0	7	3	6	**16**
**Steelers**	3	6	6	3	**18**

at Acrisure Stadium, Pittsburgh, Pennsylvania

- Date: November 17
- Game time: 1:00 p.m. EST
- Game weather: Cloudy, 52 °F (11 °C)
- Game attendance: 67,551
- Referee: Clay Martin
- TV announcers (CBS): Ian Eagle, Charles Davis and Evan Washburn
- Recap, Game Book

Game information

**First quarter**

- PIT – Chris Boswell 32-yard field goal, 10:40. Steelers 3–0. **Drive: 8 plays, 28 yards, 3:31.**

**Second quarter**

- PIT – Chris Boswell 52-yard field goal, 7:39. Steelers 6–0. **Drive: 10 plays, 50 yards, 4:52.**
- BAL – Derrick Henry 1-yard run (Justin Tucker kick), 1:16. Ravens 7–6. **Drive: 6 plays, 80 yards, 3:51.**
- PIT – Chris Boswell 32-yard field goal, 0:07. Steelers 9–7. **Drive: 4 plays, 5 yards, 0:22.**

**Third quarter**

- PIT – Chris Boswell 57-yard field goal, 10:46. Steelers 12–7. **Drive: 8 plays, 31 yards, 4:14.**
- BAL – Justin Tucker 54-yard field goal, 6:12. Steelers 12–10. **Drive: 11 plays, 34 yards, 4:34.**
- PIT – Chris Boswell 27-yard field goal, 0:56. Steelers 15–10. **Drive: 10 plays, 61 yards, 5:16.**

**Fourth quarter**

- PIT – Chris Boswell 50-yard field goal, 3:35. Steelers 18–10. **Drive: 9 plays, 32 yards, 4:39.**
- BAL – Zay Flowers 16-yard pass from Lamar Jackson (pass failed), 1:06. Steelers 18–16. **Drive: 9 plays, 69 yards, 2:29.**

**Top passers**

- BAL – Lamar Jackson – 16/33, 207 yards, TD, INT
- PIT – Russell Wilson – 23/36, 205 yards, INT

**Top rushers**

- BAL – Derrick Henry – 13 rushes, 65 yards, TD
- PIT – Najee Harris – 18 rushes, 63 yards

**Top receivers**

- BAL – Isaiah Likely – 4 receptions, 75 yards
- PIT – George Pickens – 8 receptions, 89 yards

After their close win over Washington, they returned home for an AFC North clash with the Baltimore Ravens. The game was a defensive slugfest throughout, with the Steelers being held to six Chris Boswell field goals and no touchdowns. However, the Steelers held on for a narrow 18–16 victory after stopping a game-tying two-point conversion in the waning moments of the fourth quarter.

The win improved the Steelers to 8–2 and moved into first place in the AFC North.

==== Week 12: at Cleveland Browns ====
Week 12: Pittsburgh Steelers at Cleveland Browns – game summary

Quarter	1	2	3	4	Total
Steelers	0	3	3	13	**19**
**Browns**	0	10	0	14	**24**

at Huntington Bank Field, Cleveland, Ohio

- Date: November 21
- Game time: 8:15 p.m. EST
- Game weather: Snow, 36 °F (2 °C)
- Game attendance: 67,431
- Referee: Brad Allen
- TV announcers (WPXI, WEWS): Al Michaels, Kirk Herbstreit, and Kaylee Hartung
  Game exclusive to WPXI and WEWS. Available out of market on Prime Video.
- Recap, Game Book

Game information

**First quarter**

- No scoring plays.

**Second quarter**

- PIT – Chris Boswell 48-yard field goal, 10:53. Steelers 3–0. **Drive: 10 plays, 59 yards, 6:08.**
- CLE – Nick Chubb 2-yard run (Dustin Hopkins kick), 4:00. Browns 7–3. **Drive: 12 plays, 80 yards, 6:53.**
- CLE – Dustin Hopkins 34-yard field goal, 0:40. Browns 10–3. **Drive: 6 plays, 15 yards, 2:31.**

**Third quarter**

- PIT – Chris Boswell 28-yard field goal, 1:56. Browns 10–6. **Drive: 13 plays, 71 yards, 7:13.**

**Fourth quarter**

- CLE – Jameis Winston 2-yard run (Jameis Winston–David Njoku pass), 12:16. Browns 18–6. **Drive: 10 plays, 65 yards, 4:40.**
- PIT – Jaylen Warren 3-yard run (Chris Boswell kick), 7:57. Browns 18–13. **Drive: 7 plays, 69 yards, 4:19.**
- PIT – Calvin Austin 23-yard pass from Russell Wilson (pass failed), 6:15. Steelers 19–18. **Drive: 3 plays, 27 yards, 0:50.**
- CLE – Nick Chubb 2-yard run (pass failed), 0:57. Browns 24–19. **Drive: 9 plays, 45 yards, 2:25.**

**Top passers**

- PIT – Russell Wilson – 21/28, 270 yards, TD
- CLE – Jameis Winston – 18/27, 219 yards, INT

**Top rushers**

- PIT – Jaylen Warren – 11 rushes, 45 yards, TD
- CLE – Nick Chubb – 20 rushes, 59 yards, 2 TD

**Top receivers**

- PIT – Calvin Austin – 3 receptions, 78 yards, TD
- CLE – Jerry Jeudy – 6 receptions, 85 yards

After a tough win at home, the Steelers traveled to Cleveland for Round 1 against the Browns. As neither team scored in the first quarter, the Steelers got off to a 3–0 lead in the second when Chris Boswell kicked a 48-yard field goal. Though, the Browns would go up 10–3 at halftime by way of Nick Chubb's 2-yard rushing touchdown, followed by Dustin Hopkins 34-yard field goal. The Steelers went back to work in the third quarter, making the score 10–6 by way of Boswell kicking a 28-yard field goal. In the fourth quarter, the Browns went up double digits as Jameis Winston with a 2-yard rush touchdown (with a successful two-point conversion) to make it 18–6. The Steelers managed to take the lead when Jaylen Warren ran for a 3-yard touchdown, followed up by Russell Wilson finding Calvin Austin III on a 23-yard touchdown pass to make it 19–18. The Browns retook the lead later on when Chubb ran for another 2-yard touchdown to make it 24–19. The Steelers' comeback attempt came up short, sealing the loss, and extending their losing streak in Cleveland to three games.

With their five-game winning streak snapped, the Steelers fell to 8–3.

==== Week 13: at Cincinnati Bengals ====
Week 13: Pittsburgh Steelers at Cincinnati Bengals – game summary

Quarter	1	2	3	4	Total
**Steelers**	7	20	7	10	**44**
Bengals	14	7	3	14	**38**

at Paycor Stadium, Cincinnati, Ohio

- Date: December 1
- Game time: 1:00 p.m. EST
- Game weather: Partly cloudy, 32 °F (0 °C)
- Game attendance: 66,112
- Referee: Shawn Hochuli
- TV announcers (CBS): Ian Eagle, Charles Davis and Evan Washburn
- Recap, Game Book

Game information

**First quarter**

- CIN – Cam Taylor-Britt 51-yard interception return (Evan McPherson kick), 11:49. Bengals 7–0.
- PIT – George Pickens 17-yard pass from Russell Wilson (Chris Boswell kick), 7:41. Tied 7–7. **Drive: 7 plays, 70 yards, 4:08.**
- CIN – Chase Brown 1-yard run (Evan McPherson kick), 5:01. Bengals 14–7. **Drive: 6 plays, 75 yards, 2:40.**

**Second quarter**

- PIT – Calvin Austin 23-yard pass from Russell Wilson (Chris Boswell kick), 14:56. Tied 14–14. **Drive: 10 plays, 70 yards, 5:05.**
- CIN – Ja'Marr Chase 4-yard pass from Joe Burrow (Evan McPherson kick), 9:52. Bengals 21–14. **Drive: 9 plays, 70 yards, 5:04.**
- PIT – Najee Harris 10-yard run (Chris Boswell kick), 7:19. Tied 21–21. **Drive: 5 plays, 68 yards, 2:33.**
- PIT – Chris Boswell 50-yard field goal, 3:31. Steelers 24–21. **Drive: 5 plays, 29 yards, 1:05.**
- PIT – Chris Boswell 34-yard field goal, 0:00. Steelers 27–21. **Drive: 8 plays, 65 yards, 1:56.**

**Third quarter**

- CIN – Evan McPherson 38-yard field goal, 3:53. Steelers 27–24. **Drive: 12 plays, 48 yards, 7:35.**
- PIT – Pat Freiermuth 25-yard pass from Russell Wilson (Chris Boswell kick), 0:22. Steelers 34–24. **Drive: 6 plays, 80 yards, 3:31.**

**Fourth quarter**

- PIT – Payton Wilson 21-yard fumble return (Chris Boswell kick), 11:06. Steelers 41–24.
- CIN – Tee Higgins 1-yard pass from Joe Burrow (Evan McPherson kick), 8:39. Steelers 41–31. **Drive: 7 plays, 70 yards, 2:27.**
- PIT – Chris Boswell 30-yard field goal, 3:53. Steelers 44–31. **Drive: 11 plays, 72 yards, 4:46.**
- CIN – Andrei Iosivas 3-yard pass from Joe Burrow (Evan McPherson kick), 2:39. Steelers 44–38. **Drive: 5 plays, 64 yards, 1:14.**

**Top passers**

- PIT – Russell Wilson – 29/38, 414 yards, 3 TD, INT
- CIN – Joe Burrow – 28/38, 309 yards, 3 TD, INT

**Top rushers**

- PIT – Najee Harris – 16 rushes, 75 yards, TD
- CIN – Chase Brown – 12 rushes, 70 yards, TD

**Top receivers**

- PIT – George Pickens – 3 receptions, 74 yards, TD
- CIN – Ja'Marr Chase – 6 receptions, 86 yards, TD

On the Steelers' first offensive possession, Russell Wilson threw a pick-six to Bengals safety Cam Taylor-Britt, but they responded swiftly with a touchdown drive capped off by a George Pickens touchdown pass. The teams would go blow for blow, trading touchdowns until the Steelers decided to kick a field goal to take a 24–21 lead. The Bengals drove into Steelers' territory before Joe Burrow was strip stacked by T. J. Watt, leading to a Steelers fumble recovery. The ensuing Steelers drive set up Chris Boswell to make a 34-yard field goal as the half expired with the Steelers taking a 27–21 lead.

The Bengals kicked a field goal to make the score 27–24 before the Steelers would score another touchdown on a pass to Pat Freiermuth near the end of the third quarter. Early in the 4th quarter, Joe Burrow was once again strip stacked by T. J. Watt. This time, Payton Wilson recovered the loose football and ran it back for a touchdown to give the Steelers a 41–24 lead. The Bengals would attempt a comeback effort, scoring two touchdowns later in the fourth quarter, but it fell short. The Steelers held on to win 44–38 and improved to 9–3.

For the first time since October 2018, the Steelers scored 40 or more points in a football game. Russell Wilson also became the first Steelers quarterback to throw for 400 passing yards since Ben Roethlisberger in 2018.

==== Week 14: vs. Cleveland Browns ====
Week 14: Cleveland Browns at Pittsburgh Steelers – Game Summary

Quarter	1	2	3	4	Total
Browns	7	0	0	7	**14**
**Steelers**	3	10	14	0	**27**

at Acrisure Stadium, Pittsburgh, Pennsylvania

- Date: December 8
- Game time: 1:00 p.m. EST
- Game weather: Sunny, 49 °F (9 °C)
- Game attendance: 66,845
- Referee: Land Clark
- TV announcers (CBS): Jim Nantz, Tony Romo and Tracy Wolfson
- Recap, Game Book

Game information

**First quarter**

- PIT – Chris Boswell 30-yard field goal, 9:32. Steelers 3–0. **Drive: 5 plays, 24 yards, 2:30.**
- CLE – Jerry Jeudy 35-yard pass from Jameis Winston (Dustin Hopkins kick), 5:50. Browns 7–3. **Drive: 7 plays, 70 yards, 3:42.**

**Second quarter**

- PIT – Najee Harris 1-yard run (Chris Boswell kick), 11:00. Steelers 10–7. **Drive: 5 plays, 31 yards, 2:18.**
- PIT – Chris Boswell 54-yard field goal, 4:21. Steelers 13–7. **Drive: 11 plays, 45 yards, 5:39.**

**Third quarter**

- PIT – Van Jefferson 10-yard pass from Russell Wilson (Chris Boswell kick), 8:37. Steelers 20–7. **Drive: 8 plays, 67 yards, 4:03.**
- PIT – Pat Freiermuth 20-yard pass from Russell Wilson (Chris Boswell kick), 3:51. Steelers 27–7. **Drive: 5 plays, 46 yards, 1:55.**

**Fourth quarter**

- CLE – David Njoku 15-yard pass from Jameis Winston (Dustin Hopkins kick), 7:19. Steelers 27–14. **Drive: 14 plays, 79 yards, 5:47.**

**Top passers**

- CLE – Jameis Winston – 24/41, 212 yards, 2 TD, 2 INT
- PIT – Russell Wilson – 15/26, 158 yards, 2 TD

**Top rushers**

- CLE – Nick Chubb – 11 rushes, 48 yards
- PIT – Najee Harris – 16 rushes, 53 yards, TD

**Top receivers**

- CLE – Jerry Jeudy – 5 receptions, 64 yards, TD
- PIT – Pat Freiermuth – 3 receptions, 48 yards, TD

After a tough road win, the Steelers went home for Round 2 against the Browns. The Steelers were able to start off scoring in the first quarter, making it 3–0 when Chris Boswell kicked a 30-yard field goal. The Browns took a 7–3 lead later on in when Jameis Winston found Jerry Jeudy on a 30-yard touchdown pass. The Steelers then went on to score 24 consecutive points, leading 27–7 by the end of the third quarter. The Browns were able to score the final points in the fourth when Winston for David Njoku on a 15-yard touchdown pass to make it 27–14. Following a muffed punt, the Steelers were able to recover and seal the victory, improving their record to 10–3 while winning 21 out of 22 at home games against Cleveland. This would be Pittsburgh's last win of the 2024 season.

==== Week 15: at Philadelphia Eagles ====
Week 15: Pittsburgh Steelers at Philadelphia Eagles – Game Summary

Quarter	1	2	3	4	Total
Steelers	3	10	0	0	**13**
**Eagles**	10	7	3	7	**27**

at Lincoln Financial Field, Philadelphia, Pennsylvania

- Date: December 15
- Game time: 4:25 p.m. EST
- Game weather: Partly cloudy, 37 °F (3 °C)
- Game attendance: 69,879
- Referee: Alan Eck
- TV announcers (Fox): Kevin Burkhardt, Tom Brady, Erin Andrews and Tom Rinaldi
- Recap, Game Book

Game information

**First quarter**

- PHI – Jake Elliott 34-yard field goal, 9:56. Eagles 3–0. **Drive: 7 plays, 54 yards, 3:33.**
- PIT – Chris Boswell 37-yard field goal, 3:42. Tied 3–3. **Drive: 4 plays, −8 yards, 0:31.**
- PHI – A. J. Brown 5-yard pass from Jalen Hurts (Jake Elliott kick), 1:13. Eagles 10–3. **Drive: 6 plays, 70 yards, 2:29.**

**Second quarter**

- PHI – DeVonta Smith 2-yard pass from Jalen Hurts (Jake Elliott kick), 9:07. Eagles 17–3. **Drive: 9 plays, 45 yards, 4:33.**
- PIT – Pat Freiermuth 9-yard pass from Russell Wilson (Chris Boswell kick), 2:34. Eagles 17–10. **Drive: 11 plays, 70 yards, 6:33.**
- PIT – Chris Boswell 49-yard field goal, 0:37. Eagles 17–13. **Drive: 5 plays, 14 yards, 0:40.**

**Third quarter**

- PHI – Jake Elliott 41-yard field goal, 7:52. Eagles 20–13. **Drive: 13 plays, 47 yards, 7:08.**

**Fourth quarter**

- PHI – Jalen Hurts 1-yard run (Jake Elliott kick), 14:17. Eagles 27–13. **Drive: 13 plays, 74 yards, 6:33.**

**Top passers**

- PIT – Russell Wilson – 14/22, 128 yards, TD
- PHI – Jalen Hurts – 25/32, 290 yards, 2 TD

**Top rushers**

- PIT – Najee Harris – 6 rushes, 14 yards
- PHI – Saquon Barkley – 19 rushes, 65 yards

**Top receivers**

- PIT – Calvin Austin – 5 receptions, 65 yards
- PHI – A. J. Brown – 8 receptions, 110 yards, TD

The Steelers traveled to east Pennsylvania to take on cross-state rivals Eagles. In the first quarter, the Eagles scored first when Jake Elliot kicked a 34-yard field goal to make it 3–0. The Steelers tied it up at 3–3 when Chris Boswell kicked a 37-yard field goal. The Eagles then moved ahead 10–3 by way of Jalen Hurts connecting with A. J. Brown on a 5-yard touchdown pass. The Eagles increased their lead to 17–3 when Hurts found DeVonta Smith on a 2-yard touchdown pass. The Steelers were able to shorten the lead to 17–13 before halftime by way of Russell Wilson connecting with Pat Freiermuth on a 9-yard touchdown pass, followed up by Boswell kicking a 49-yard field goal. The second half saw only the Eagles score the game's remaining points as they went on to win 27–13, sealing the Steelers' loss and dropping them to 10–4. This also marked their 10th loss in Philadelphia since 1965.

==== Week 16: at Baltimore Ravens ====
Week 16: Pittsburgh Steelers at Baltimore Ravens – Game Summary

Quarter	1	2	3	4	Total
Steelers	0	10	7	0	**17**
**Ravens**	7	10	7	10	**34**

at M&T Bank Stadium, Baltimore, Maryland

- Date: December 21
- Game time: 4:30 p.m. EST
- Game weather: Cloudy, 35 °F (2 °C)
- Game attendance: 71,313
- Referee: Bill Vinovich
- TV announcers (Fox): Kevin Burkhardt, Tom Brady, Erin Andrews and Tom Rinaldi
- Recap, Game Book

Game information

**First quarter**

- BAL – Isaiah Likely 9-yard pass from Lamar Jackson (Justin Tucker kick), 5:52. Ravens 7–0. **Drive: 6 plays, 41 yards, 3:08.**

**Second quarter**

- PIT – MyCole Pruitt 1-yard pass from Russell Wilson (Chris Boswell kick), 14:56. Tied 7–7. **Drive: 10 plays, 73 yards, 5:56.**
- BAL – Rashod Bateman 14-yard pass from Lamar Jackson (Justin Tucker kick), 7:28. Ravens 14–7. **Drive: 8 plays, 96 yards, 3:29.**
- BAL – Justin Tucker 51-yard field goal, 1:43. Ravens 17–7. **Drive: 10 plays, 39 yards, 4:14.**
- PIT – Chris Boswell 51-yard field goal, 0:00. Ravens 17–10. **Drive: 9 plays, 37 yards, 1:43.**

**Third quarter**

- PIT – Cordarrelle Patterson 12-yard pass from Russell Wilson (Chris Boswell kick), 5:14. Tied 17–17. **Drive: 8 plays, 88 yards, 4:38.**
- BAL – Mark Andrews 7-yard pass from Lamar Jackson (Justin Tucker kick), 1:50. Ravens 24–17. **Drive: 6 plays, 60 yards, 3:24.**

**Fourth quarter**

- BAL – Marlon Humphrey 37-yard interception return (Justin Tucker kick), 13:06. Ravens 31–17.
- BAL – Justin Tucker 23-yard field goal, 3:10. Ravens 34–17. **Drive: 11 plays, 86 yards, 6:09.**

**Top passers**

- PIT – Russell Wilson – 22/33, 217 yards, 2 TD, INT
- BAL – Lamar Jackson – 15/23, 207 yards, 3 TD, INT

**Top rushers**

- PIT – Jaylen Warren – 12 rushes, 48 yards
- BAL – Derrick Henry – 24 rushes, 162 yards

**Top receivers**

- PIT – Calvin Austin – 4 receptions, 65 yards
- BAL – Zay Flowers – 5 receptions, 100 yards

After a tough road loss, the Steelers traveled again for Round 2 against the Ravens. In the first quarter, the Ravens scored the only points of the period when Lamar Jackson found Isaiah Likely on a 9-yard touchdown pass for a 7–0 lead. The Steelers tied it up at 7–7 in the second quarter when Russell Wilson found MyCole Pruitt on a 1-yard touchdown pass. The Ravens eventually pushed ahead 17–7 by way of Jackson finding Rashod Bateman on a 14-yard touchdown pass, followed up by Justin Tucker kicking a 51-yard field goal. The Steelers drew closer, making the score 17–10 at halftime with Chris Boswell kicking a 51-yard field goal of his own. The Steelers scored first in the third quarter, tying the game at 17–17 when Wilson found Cordarrelle Patterson on a 12-yard touchdown pass. Though, the Ravens scored the remaining 17 points of the game to win 34–17 and handed the Steelers their second straight loss while also snapping the team's four-game winning streak over them. The Steelers dropped to 10–5.

==== Week 17: vs. Kansas City Chiefs ====
Christmas Day games

Week 17: Kansas City Chiefs at Pittsburgh Steelers – Game Summary

Quarter	1	2	3	4	Total
**Chiefs**	13	0	3	13	**29**
Steelers	0	7	3	0	**10**

at Acrisure Stadium, Pittsburgh, Pennsylvania

- Date: December 25
- Game time: 1:00 p.m. EST
- Game weather: Cloudy, 39 °F (4 °C)
- Game attendance: 67,311
- Referee: Craig Wrolstad
- TV announcers (KDKA, KCTV): Ian Eagle, Nate Burleson, J. J. Watt, Melanie Collins and Stacey Dales
  Game exclusive to KDKA and KCTV through syndication. Out of market on Netflix.
- Recap, Game Book

Game information

**First quarter**

- KC – Xavier Worthy 7-yard pass from Patrick Mahomes (kick failed, wide right), 9:19. Chiefs 6–0. **Drive: 8 plays, 42 yards, 3:56.**
- KC – Justin Watson 11-yard pass from Patrick Mahomes (Harrison Butker kick), 4:00. Chiefs 13–0. **Drive: 7 plays, 79 yards, 2:33.**

**Second quarter**

- PIT – Russell Wilson 1-yard run (Chris Boswell kick), 10:28. Chiefs 13–7. **Drive: 11 plays, 72 yards, 5:08.**

**Third quarter**

- KC – Harrison Butker 32-yard field goal, 12:21. Chiefs 16–7. **Drive: 8 plays, 54 yards, 2:39.**
- PIT – Chris Boswell 36-yard field goal, 5:45. Chiefs 16–10. **Drive: 12 plays, 52 yards, 6:36.**

**Fourth quarter**

- KC – Kareem Hunt 2-yard run (pass failed), 14:56. Chiefs 22–10. **Drive: 11 plays, 77 yards, 5:49.**
- KC – Travis Kelce 12-yard pass from Patrick Mahomes (Harrison Butker kick), 12:38. Chiefs 29–10. **Drive: 4 plays, 34 yards, 1:24.**

**Top passers**

- KC – Patrick Mahomes – 29/38, 320 yards, 3 TD
- PIT – Russell Wilson – 23/37, 205 yards, INT

**Top rushers**

- KC – Kareem Hunt – 9 rushes, 20 yards, TD
- PIT – Najee Harris – 13 rushes, 74 yards

**Top receivers**

- KC – Travis Kelce – 8 receptions, 84 yards, TD
- PIT – Pat Freiermuth – 7 receptions, 60 yards

After another tough loss on the road, the Steelers returned home for game against the Chiefs on Christmas Day, in a game exclusive to KCTV in Kansas City and KDKA in Pittsburgh (and a different out-of-market carrier than normal). The Chiefs would jump out to a 13–0 lead after the first quarter. Not before the Steelers would score the second quarter's only points, by way of Russell Wilson's 1-yard rushing touchdown to make it 13–7 at halftime. In the third quarter, Harrison Butker gave the Chiefs a 16–7 lead, by way of him kicking a 32-yard field goal. Despite that Chris Boswell kicked a 36-yard field goal later on in the quarter to shorten the deficit 16–10 later on in the quarter, the whole fourth quarter would be all Chiefs as they scored the remaining 13 points to win the game 29–10.

With their third straight loss, the Steelers fell to 10–6 and second place in the AFC North after the Ravens' win over the Texans, later on in the day. The Steelers also failed to secure the No. 1 seed in the AFC, as the Chiefs' win automatically secured it for Kansas City.

==== Week 18: vs. Cincinnati Bengals ====
Week 18: Cincinnati Bengals at Pittsburgh Steelers – Game Summary

Quarter	1	2	3	4	Total
**Bengals**	10	3	3	3	**19**
Steelers	0	7	0	10	**17**

at Acrisure Stadium, Pittsburgh, Pennsylvania

- Date: January 4
- Game time: 8:00 p.m. EST
- Game weather: Cloudy, 19 °F (−7 °C)
- Game attendance: 65,631
- Referee: John Hussey
- TV announcers (ESPN/ABC/ESPN+): Joe Buck, Troy Aikman and Lisa Salters
- Recap, Game Book

Game information

**First quarter**

- CIN – Ja'Marr Chase 12-yard pass from Joe Burrow (Cade York kick), 9:49. Bengals 7–0. **Drive: 9 plays, 73 yards, 5:11.**
- CIN – Cade York 48-yard field goal, 1:48. Bengals 10–0. **Drive: 11 plays, 37 yards, 6:23.**

**Second quarter**

- PIT – Najee Harris 1-yard run (Chris Boswell kick), 9:54. Bengals 10–7. **Drive: 13 plays, 73 yards, 6:30.**
- CIN – Cade York 27-yard field goal, 0:16. Bengals 13–7. **Drive: 7 plays, 28 yards, 0:32.**

**Third quarter**

- CIN – Cade York 35-yard field goal, 6:56. Bengals 16–7. **Drive: 11 plays, 47 yards, 6:28.**

**Fourth quarter**

- CIN – Cade York 23-yard field goal, 11:02. Bengals 19–7. **Drive: 15 plays, 82 yards, 8:31.**
- PIT – Pat Freiermuth 19-yard pass from Russell Wilson (Chris Boswell kick), 8:07. Bengals 19–14. **Drive: 9 plays, 65 yards, 2:55.**
- PIT – Chris Boswell 54-yard field goal, 2:39. Bengals 19–17. **Drive: 6 plays, 2 yards, 2:35.**

**Top passers**

- CIN – Joe Burrow – 37/46, 277 yards, TD, INT
- PIT – Russell Wilson – 17/31, 148 yards, TD

**Top rushers**

- CIN – Khalil Herbert – 20 rushes, 69 yards
- PIT – Najee Harris – 12 rushes, 36 yards, TD

**Top receivers**

- CIN – Ja'Marr Chase – 10 receptions, 96 yards, TD
- PIT – Pat Freiermuth – 8 receptions, 85 yards, TD

After a tough loss at home on Christmas Day, the Steelers stayed home for their regular season finale to face the Bengals for the second time this season. The Bengals jumped out to a 10–0 lead in the first quarter, before the Steelers shortened it to 10–7 by way of a 1-yard touchdown run by Najee Harris. The Bengals then made it 13–7 at halftime when Cade York kicked a 27-yard field goal. Well into the fourth quarter, the Bengals jumped out to a 19–7 lead before the Steelers came close with a couple of scores of their own: Russell Wilson connecting with Pat Freiermuth on a 19-yard touchdown pass, followed by Chris Boswell kicking a 54-yard field goal. Unfortunately for the Steelers, the comeback attempt fell short, sealing the 19–17 loss.

With their fourth straight loss, the Steelers finished their regular season at 10–7 for the second year in a row. The team had to settle for the AFC's 6 seed with the Chargers' win over the Raiders the next day.

=== Standings ===
==== Division ====
AFC North
	W	L	T	PCT	DIV	CONF	PF	PA	STK
^{(3)} Baltimore Ravens	12	5	0	.706	4–2	8–4	518	361	W4
^{(6)} Pittsburgh Steelers	10	7	0	.588	3–3	7–5	380	347	L4
Cincinnati Bengals	9	8	0	.529	3–3	6–6	472	434	W5
Cleveland Browns	3	14	0	.176	2–4	3–9	258	435	L6

==== Conference ====
AFC
Seed	Team	Division	W	L	T	PCT	DIV	CONF	SOS	SOV	STK
**Division leaders**
1	Kansas City Chiefs	West	15	2	0	.882	5–1	10–2	.488	.463	L1
2	Buffalo Bills	East	13	4	0	.765	5–1	9–3	.467	.448	L1
3	Baltimore Ravens	North	12	5	0	.706	4–2	8–4	.529	.525	W4
4	Houston Texans	South	10	7	0	.588	5–1	8–4	.481	.376	W1
**Wild cards**
5	Los Angeles Chargers	West	11	6	0	.647	4–2	8–4	.467	.348	W3
6 (Note: Pittsburgh clinched the #6 seed over Denver based on head-to-head victory.)	Pittsburgh Steelers	North	10	7	0	.588	3–3	7–5	.502	.453	L4
7	Denver Broncos	West	10	7	0	.588	3–3	6–6	.502	.394	W1
**Did not qualify for the postseason**
8	Cincinnati Bengals	North	9	8	0	.529	3–3	6–6	.478	.314	W5
9 (Note: Indianapolis finished ahead of Miami based on head-to-head victory.)	Indianapolis Colts	South	8	9	0	.471	3–3	7–5	.457	.309	W1
10	Miami Dolphins	East	8	9	0	.471	3–3	6–6	.419	.294	L1
11	New York Jets	East	5	12	0	.294	2–4	5–7	.495	.341	W1
12 (Note: Jacksonville finished ahead of New England and Las Vegas based on conference record. (Jacksonville 4–8 to New England 3–9 to Las Vegas 3–9))	Jacksonville Jaguars	South	4	13	0	.235	3–3	4–8	.478	.265	L1
13 (Note: New England finished ahead of Las Vegas based on strength of victory. (New England .471 to Las Vegas .353))	New England Patriots	East	4	13	0	.235	2–4	3–9	.471	.471	W1
14	Las Vegas Raiders	West	4	13	0	.235	0–6	3–9	.540	.353	L1
15 (Note: Cleveland finished ahead of Tennessee based on strength of victory. (Cleveland .510 to Tennessee .431))	Cleveland Browns	North	3	14	0	.176	2–4	3–9	.536	.510	L6
16	Tennessee Titans	South	3	14	0	.176	1–5	3–9	.522	.431	L6
**Tiebreakers** (Note: When breaking ties for three or more teams under the NFL's rules, they are first broken within divisions, then comparing only the highest ranked remaining team from each division.)

== Postseason ==
=== Schedule ===
Round	Date	Opponent (seed)	Result	Record	Venue	Recap
Wild card	January 11	at Baltimore Ravens (3)	L 14–28	0–1	M&T Bank Stadium	Recap

=== Game summaries ===
==== AFC wild-card playoffs: at (3) Baltimore Ravens ====
AFC wild-card playoffs: (6) Pittsburgh Steelers at (3) Baltimore Ravens – game summary

Quarter	1	2	3	4	Total
Steelers	0	0	14	0	14
Ravens	7	14	7	0	28

at M&T Bank Stadium, Baltimore, Maryland

- Date: January 11, 2025
- Game time: 8:00 p.m. EST
- Game weather: Clear, 32 °F (0 °C)
- Game attendance: 70,546
- Referee: Alex Kemp
- TV announcers (WPXI, WMAR): Al Michaels, Kirk Herbstreit and Kaylee Hartung
  Game exclusive to WPXI and WMAR. Out of market on Prime Video.
- Recap, Game Book

Game information

First quarter

- BAL – Rashod Bateman 15-yard pass from Lamar Jackson (Justin Tucker kick), 4:45. Ravens 7–0. Drive: 13 plays, 95 yards, 7:13.

Second quarter

- BAL – Derrick Henry 8-yard run (Justin Tucker kick), 4:09. Ravens 14–0. Drive: 13 plays, 85 yards, 7:56.
- BAL – Justice Hill 5-yard pass from Lamar Jackson (Justin Tucker kick), 0:02. Ravens 21–0. Drive: 9 plays, 90 yards, 1:51.

Third quarter

- PIT – Van Jefferson 30-yard pass from Russell Wilson (Chris Boswell kick), 8:05. Ravens 21–7. Drive: 9 plays, 98 yards, 3:24.
- BAL – Derrick Henry 44-yard run (Justin Tucker kick), 5:49. Ravens 28–7. Drive: 4 plays, 70 yards, 2:16.
- PIT – George Pickens 36-yard pass from Russell Wilson (Chris Boswell kick), 3:24. Ravens 28–14. Drive: 5 plays, 70 yards, 2:25.

Fourth quarter

- No scoring plays

Top passers

- PIT – Russell Wilson – 20/29, 270 yards, 2 TD
- BAL – Lamar Jackson – 16/21, 175 yards, 2 TD

Top rushers

- PIT – Najee Harris – 6 rushes, 17 yards
- BAL – Derrick Henry – 26 rushes, 186 yards, 2 TD

Top receivers

- PIT – George Pickens – 5 receptions, 87 yards, TD
- BAL – Isaiah Likely – 3 receptions, 53 yards

With the loss, the Steelers lost two straight games to Baltimore for the first time since 2019 while losing their sixth postseason game since 2016.
