= Zach Frazier =

American football player (born 2001)

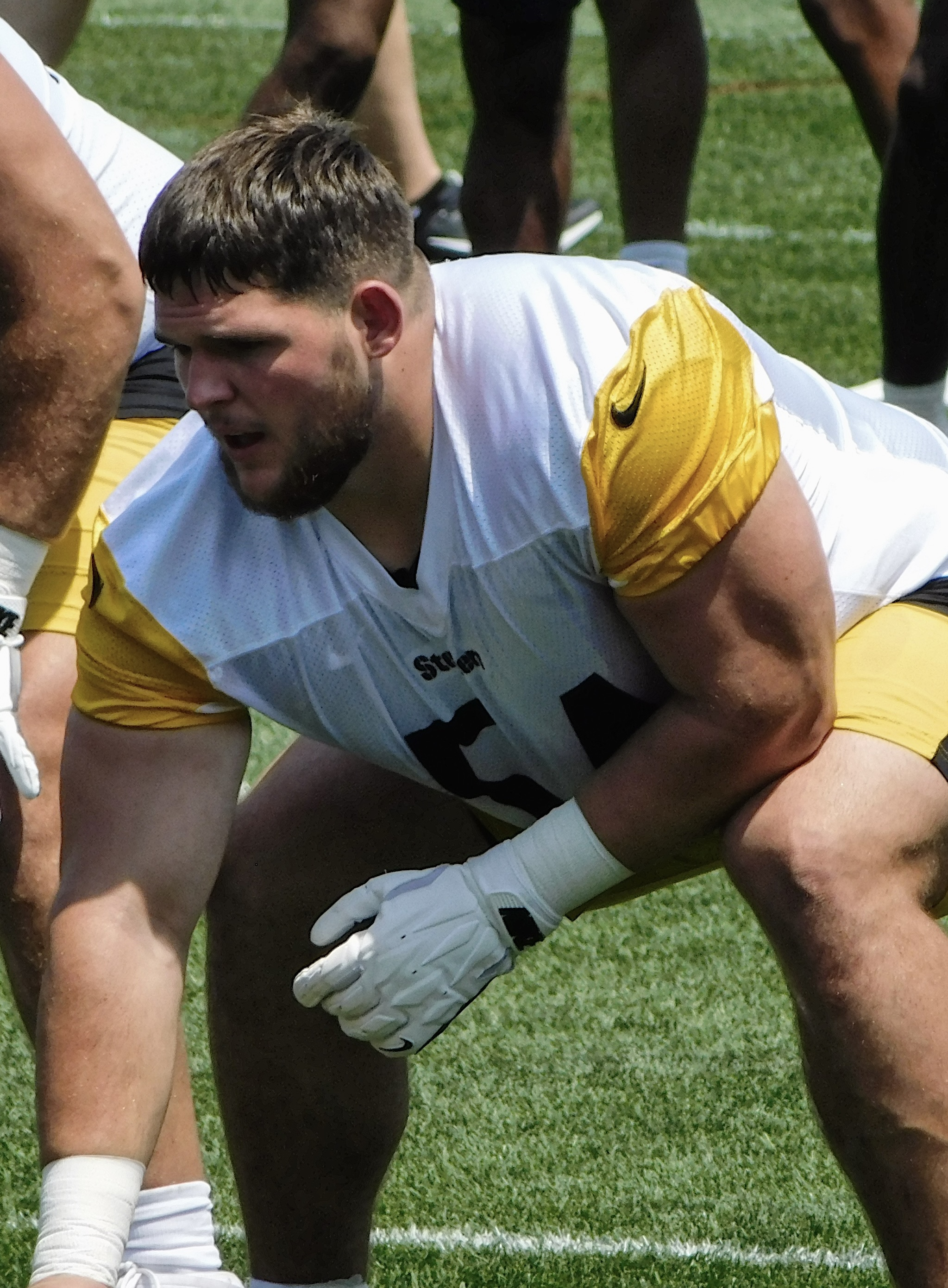
- Frazier with the Pittsburgh Steelers in 2025

No. 54 – Pittsburgh Steelers
- Position: Center
- Roster status: Active

Personal information
- Born: August 29, 2001 (age 25); Fairmont, West Virginia, U.S.
- Listed height: 6 ft 3 in (1.91 m)
- Listed weight: 310 lb (141 kg)

Career information
- High school: Fairmont Senior
- College: West Virginia (2020–2023)
- NFL draft: 2024: 2nd round, 51st overall pick

Career history
- Pittsburgh Steelers (2024–present)

Awards and highlights
- PFWA All-Rookie Team (2024); First-team All-Big 12 (2023); 2× second-team All-Big 12 (2021, 2022)

Career NFL statistics as of Week 7, 2026
- Games played: 39
- Games started: 38
- Stats at Pro Football Reference

Zach Frazier (born August 29, 2001) is an American professional football center for the Pittsburgh Steelers of the National Football League (NFL). He played college football for the West Virginia Mountaineers.

== Early life ==
Frazier was born in Fairmont, West Virginia. He is related to several state champion wrestlers through his mother's side of the family while his father played football for the Fairmont State Fighting Falcons. In addition to playing sports, Frazier excelled academically: he declared on his first day of kindergarten that he would win an award for having perfect grades throughout elementary school, accomplished that goal, and had a 4.5 grade-point average (GPA) with one semester left in high school.

Frazier attended Fairmont Senior High School where he played football and was a wrestler; in football, he played two-ways and was thrice selected first-team All-Class AA while in wrestling, he won four consecutive heavyweight state championships. He was named the 2019–20 Times West Virginian wrestler of the year after being the first in school history to win four wrestling championships and finished his high school career with a 159–2 record, the highest winning percentage in Marion County history. He helped his school's football team reach the class championship three times in four years, winning it once it 2018. He had 54 starts in his football career which set a team record, and was named as a senior the Stydahar Award winner as the best lineman in the state. He committed to play college football for the West Virginia Mountaineers, being ranked the second-best recruit in the state.

== College career ==
After an injury to Chase Behrndt, Frazier became West Virginia's starter at center in the first game of his true freshman season in 2020, being the first person to do so at the school in over 40 years. He then shifted to guard when Behrndt returned and ultimately started all 10 games in the 2020 season. He did not allow a sack in nine games and was named first-team Freshman All-American as well as honorable mention All-Big 12. Off the field, he was named to the Big 12 Academic All-Rookie team.

Frazier became West Virginia's starting center in 2021 and started every game at the position, appearing on every offensive snap in the season. He was the team leader with 60 knockdown blocks and allowed just two sacks while being graded at 90% or higher in all but two games. He was second-team All-Big 12, second-team All-American and first-team Academic All-Big 12. He was also their nominee for Big 12 Athlete of the Year. In 2022, Frazier started all 12 games, allowed only one sack, and was chosen first-team all-conference as he helped the team average 171.5 rushing yards per game while being their leader with 51 knockdown blocks. He also repeated as a first-team Academic All-Big 12 honoree.

Frazier entered the 2023 season as a preseason first-team All-American and member of the Lombardi Award watch list. Midseason, he was selected as one of 16 finalists for the William V. Campbell Trophy.

== Professional career ==
Pre-draft measurables
Height	Weight	Arm length	Hand span	Wingspan	40-yard dash	10-yard split	20-yard split	20-yard shuttle	Three-cone drill	Vertical jump	Broad jump	Bench press
6 ft 2 5/8 in (1.90 m)	313 lb (142 kg)	32 1/4 in (0.82 m)	10 7/8 in (0.28 m)	6 ft 6 1/2 in (1.99 m)	5.26 s	1.81 s	3.00 s	4.69 s	7.85 s	28.5 in (0.72 m)	8 ft 4 in (2.54 m)	30 reps
All values from NFL Combine/Pro Day

=== 2024 season ===
Frazier was selected in the second round with the 51st overall pick in the 2024 NFL draft by the Pittsburgh Steelers. Frazier signed his four-year rookie contract with the Steelers on June 10.

Originally, Frazier was named the backup to Nate Herbig at the center position. However, Herbig would be injured during the preseason and be placed on the injured reserve list, ending his season prematurely and thrusting Frazier into the Week 1 starting position. He made his professional debut in Week 1's Steelers win over the Atlanta Falcons. He would subsequently start the first six games of the season. As a rookie center, Frazier called multiple plays through his first six starts. During Week 6's 32–13 win over the Las Vegas Raiders, Frazier was relieved by Ryan McCollum when a Raiders defender fell on Frazier's ankle during a block. Frazier did not suffer any major injury, but was ruled out ahead of Week 7's 37–15 victory over the New York Jets and was considered "week-to-week" on the Steelers' injury report until after their Week 9 bye. He would return to the field on November 10 during a narrow 28–27 Steelers win over the Washington Commanders.

On New Year's Eve, Frazier was voted the team's offensive rookie of the year, making him just the second center in franchise history to do so with Maurkice Pouncey being the first in 2010. Frazier finished the regular season appearing in 15 games, playing 975 offensive snaps, only allowed one sack and committed just five penalties as the team ended the season with a record of 10–7 to give Frazier his first playoff berth. He appeared in the team's 28–14 loss to the Baltimore Ravens in the AFC Wild Card playoff round.

Frazier was selected to the Pro Football Writers Association (PFWA) NFL All-Rookie Team on January 21, 2025. This made Frazier the second consecutive Steeler to appear on the list after Joey Porter Jr. the season prior. In addition to this, Frazier was the recipient of the Joe Greene Great Performance Award.

=== 2025 season ===
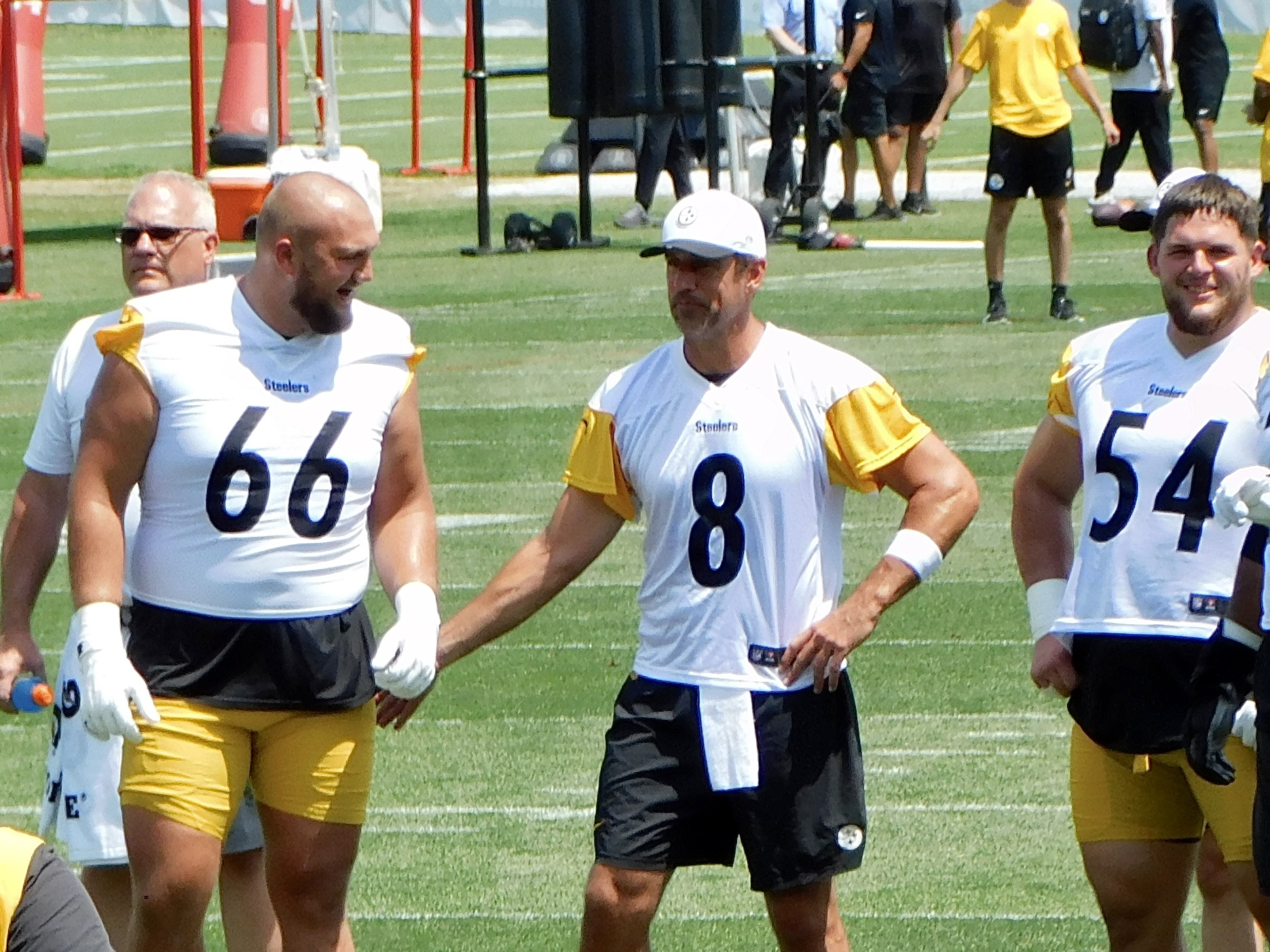
Frazier (54) alongside Aaron Rodgers and Mason McCormick during a Steelers practice in 2025

During his sophomore training camp, Frazier began taking first team reps. He struggled in his initial practices with quarterback Aaron Rodgers. Frazier told Pittsburgh media that he will “fix it” as it was something he “normally” didn't struggle with. Ultimately, Frazier was named the Steelers starting center for a second consecutive season when the team's first depth chart was released on September 2. He made his first start of the year in Week 1's matchup with the New York Jets, which the Steelers won 34–32. He was named one of the best centers in the league for his performance in Week 1 by PFF, placing in third behind Tyler Linderbaum and Creed Humphrey.

Frazier finished the 2025 season appearing in all 17 regular season games. He recorded a second consecutive postseason start when the Steelers won first place in the AFC North, the first time of Frazier's professional career the team did so. Frazier and the Steelers fell in the wildcard round to the Houston Texans, ending the season.

=== 2026 season ===
Frazier during training camp in 2026

To start the 2026 season, Frazier recorded the third best run-blocking grade amongst all starting centers, according to PFF.

== NFL career statistics ==
Legend
**Bold**	Career high

Year	Team	Games		Offense			
Year	Team	GP	GS	Snaps	Holding	False Start	Illegal Shift
2024	PIT	15	15	976	1	0	0
2025	PIT	17	16	**1,026**	**2**	**1**	0
2026	PIT	7	7	474	1	0	0
Career		39	38	2,476	4	1	0
