= Roman Wilson =

American football player (born 2001)

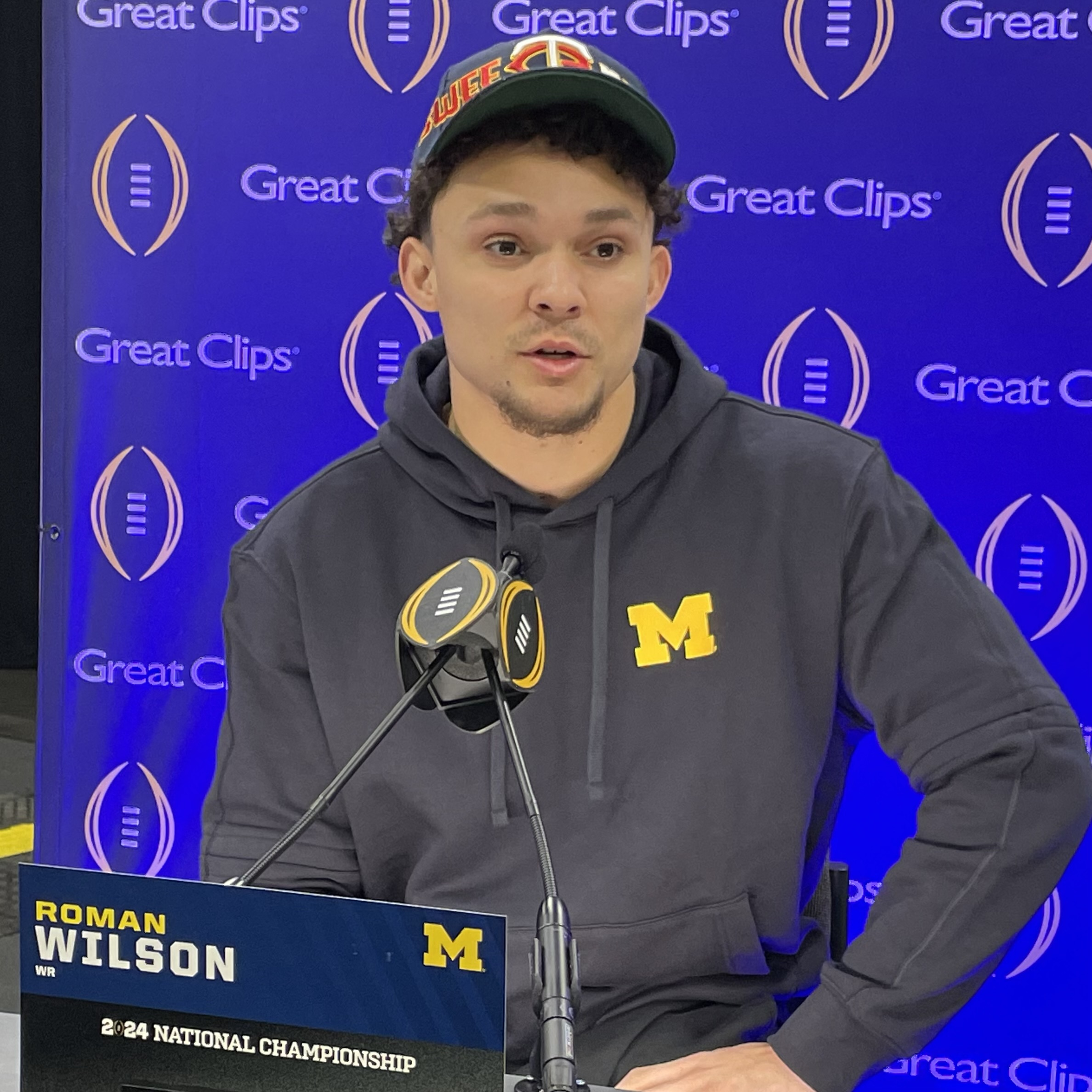
- Wilson in 2024

No. 14 – Pittsburgh Steelers
- Position: Wide receiver
- Roster status: Active

Personal information
- Born: June 19, 2001 (age 25); Kihei, Hawaii, U.S.
- Listed height: 5 ft 10 in (1.78 m)
- Listed weight: 186 lb (84 kg)

Career information
- High school: Saint Louis (Honolulu, Hawaii)
- College: Michigan (2020–2023)
- NFL draft: 2024: 3rd round, 84th overall pick

Career history
- Pittsburgh Steelers (2024–present)

Awards and highlights
- CFP national champion (2023); Second-team All-Big Ten (2023)

Career NFL statistics as of 2026
- Receptions: 26
- Receiving yards: 354
- Touchdowns: 4
- Stats at Pro Football Reference

Roman Jeffrey Wilson (born June 19, 2001) is an American professional football wide receiver for the Pittsburgh Steelers of the National Football League (NFL). He played college football for the Michigan Wolverines, winning three consecutive Big Ten Conference titles and a national championship in 2023. Wilson was named an All-Big Ten selection. He was selected by the Steelers in the third round of the 2024 NFL draft.

== Early life ==
Wilson was born on June 19, 2001, in Kihei, Hawaii, later attending Saint Louis School in Honolulu. During his time at Saint Louis, Wilson helped the football team to a 38-game winning streak, winning four consecutive state championships.

As a senior in 2019, he caught 61 passes for 1,025 yards and 11 touchdowns. In the 2019 state championship game, he caught eight passes for 171 yards, with an 86-yard touchdown.

Wilson attended Nike's The Opening regional camp in 2019, where he won the 'Fastest Man' race, running the 40-yard dash is 4.37 seconds. Wilson was rated as a four star recruit, and the third best player from Hawaii.

== College career ==
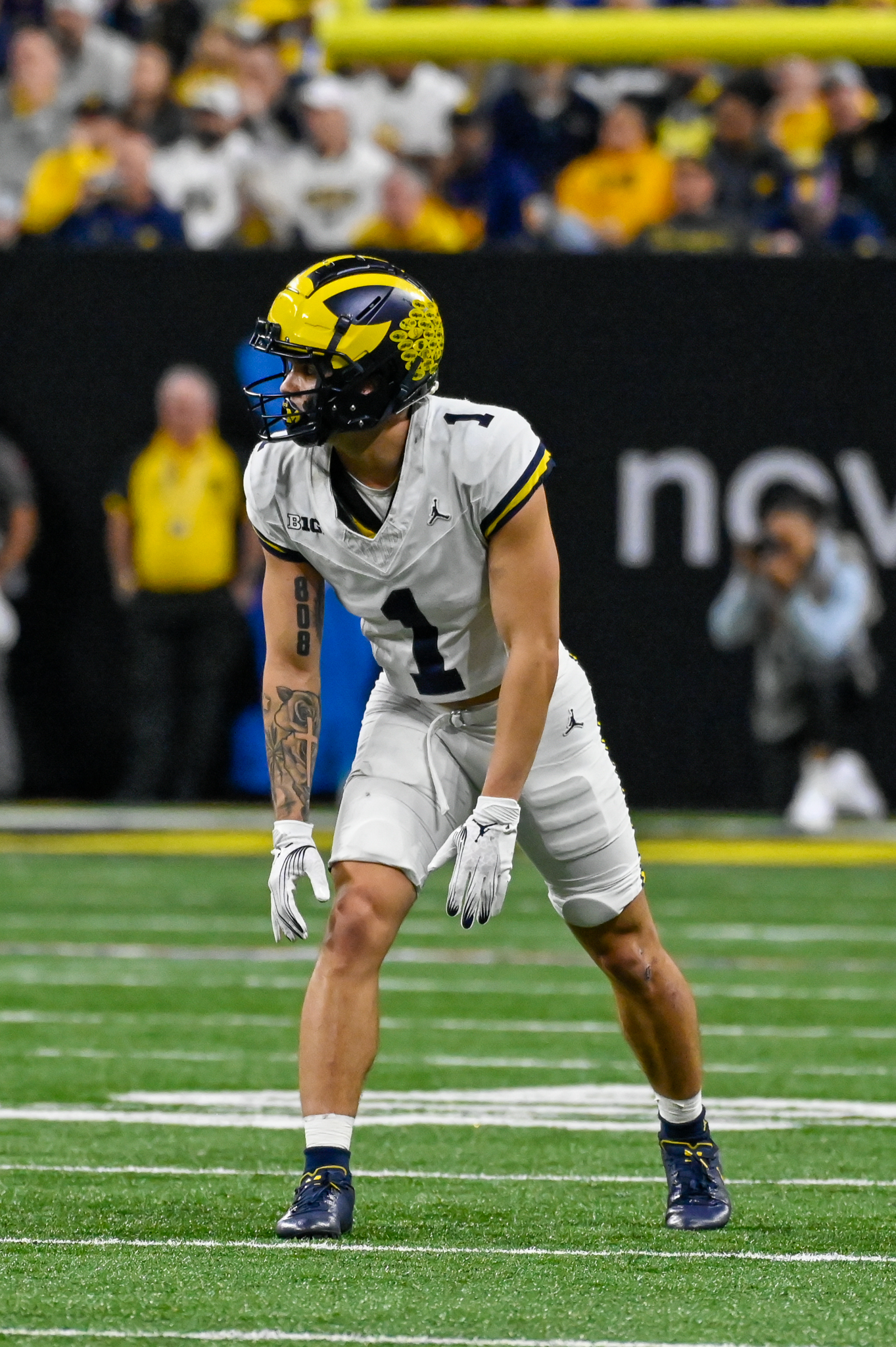
Wilson with Michigan in the 2023 Big Ten Championship.

Wilson committed to play college football for the University of Michigan in July 2019. As a freshman, in the COVID-shortened 2020 season, Wilson appeared in all six games. He caught 9 passes for 122 yards and his first career touchdown, a 13-yard grab from Joe Milton, against Indiana on November 7, 2020.

As a sophomore in 2021, he appeared in all 13 games and caught 25 passes for 420 yards and two touchdowns. He also rushed for 59 yards on three carries.

In the 2022 season opener against Colorado State, Wilson caught a bubble screen pass and ran for a 61-yard touchdown. In week two, the Honolulu native faced his hometown team, Hawaii. In the first quarter, he scored two touchdowns on a 42-yard touchdown pass from J. J. McCarthy and a 21-yard run. As a junior, in 2022, he caught 25 passes for 376 yards and four touchdowns. He also rushed for two touchdowns.

In 2023, Wilson started all 15 games and won a national championship with Michigan as a senior. In the Rose Bowl against Alabama, Wilson scored the touchdown that sent the game into overtime. Wilson was named second-team All-Big Ten by both the coaches and media. He finished the season with 48 receptions for 789 yards and 12 touchdowns.

== Professional career ==
Pre-draft measurables
Height	Weight	Arm length	Hand span	Wingspan	40-yard dash	10-yard split	20-yard split	20-yard shuttle	Three-cone drill	Bench press
5 ft 10 3/4 in (1.80 m)	185 lb (84 kg)	30 3/8 in (0.77 m)	9 3/8 in (0.24 m)	6 ft 0 1/2 in (1.84 m)	4.39 s	1.52 s	2.55 s	4.07 s	6.89 s	12 reps
All values from NFL Combine/Pro Day

=== Pittsburgh Steelers ===
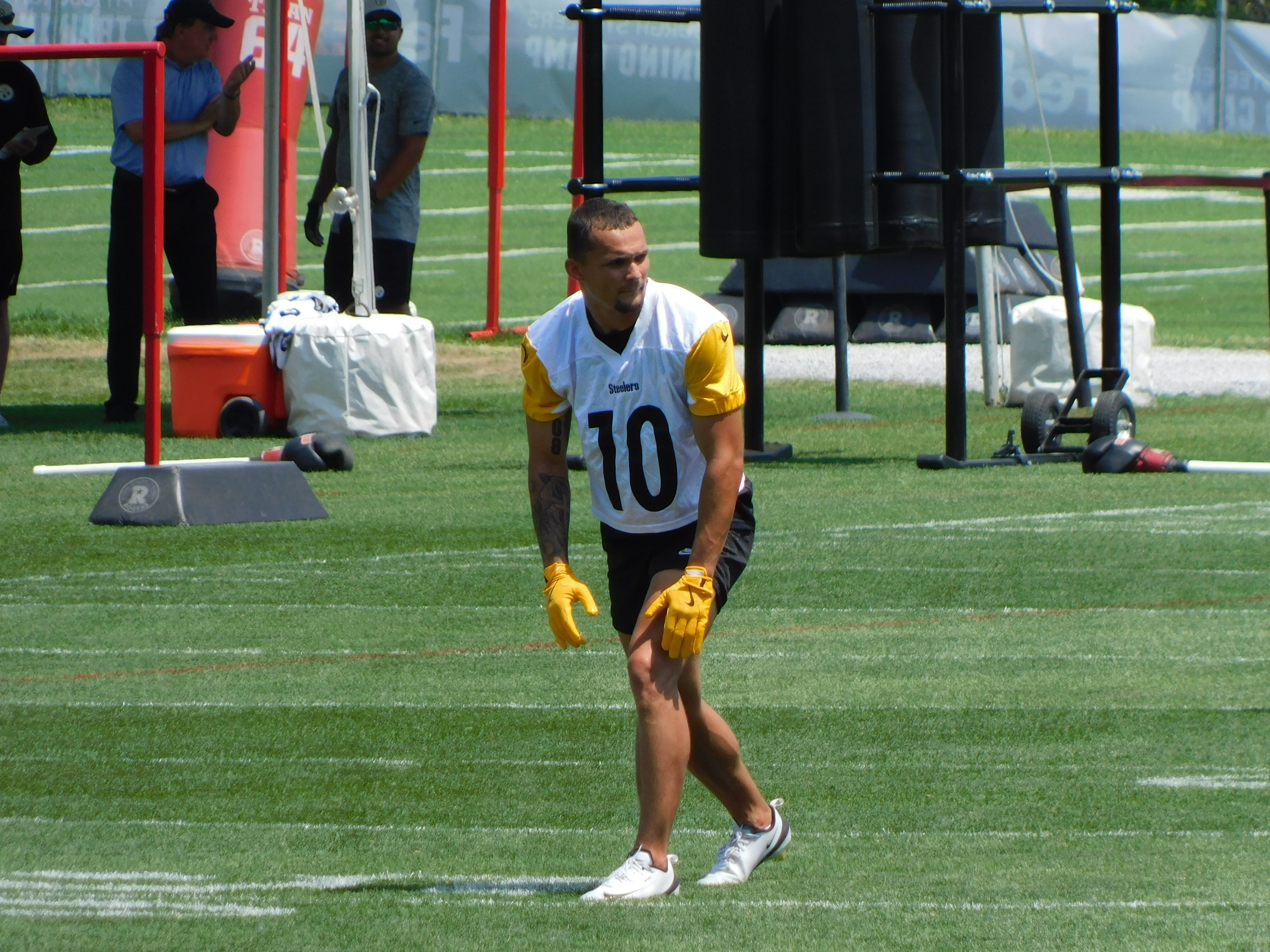
Wilson with the Pittsburgh Steelers in 2025

Wilson was selected 84th overall by the Pittsburgh Steelers in the third round of the 2024 NFL draft. Wilson sustained an ankle injury during the first padded practice of Steelers' training camp, causing him to miss the remainder of camp and the preseason. He returned to action in Week 6 against the Raiders on October 13, appearing for five offensive snaps. On October 28, he was placed on the Reserve/Injured List due to a hamstring injury. Although he was designated for return before the final regular season game, he remained on the injured list for the rest of his rookie season.

On September 14, 2025, Wilson made his first professional catch on a seven-yard pass from Aaron Rodgers. It was the only catch he would make during the 31–17 loss to the Seattle Seahawks.

== Career statistics ==
Legend
**Bold**	Career high

=== NFL ===
==== Regular season ====
Year	Team	Games		Receiving							Rushing					Fumbles	
Year	Team	GP	GS	Tgt	Rec	Yds	Avg	Y/G	Lng	TD	Att	Yds	Avg	Lng	TD	Fum	Lost
2024	PIT	1	0	0	0	0	0.0	0.0	—	0	0	0	0.0	—	0	0	0
2025	PIT	13	4	21	12	166	**13.8**	12.8	45	**2**	0	0	0.0	—	0	**1**	**1**
2026	PIT	5	1	**25**	**14**	**188**	13.4	**37.6**	**49**	**2**	0	0	0.0	—	0	0	0
Career		19	5	46	26	354	13.6	18.6	49	4	0	0	0.0	—	0	1	1

==== Postseason ====
Year	Team	Games		Receiving							Rushing					Fumbles	
Year	Team	GP	GS	Tgt	Rec	Yds	Avg	Y/G	Lng	TD	Att	Yds	Avg	Lng	TD	Fum	Lost
2024	PIT	0	0	Did not play due to injury													
Career		0	0	0	0	0	0.0	0.0	—	0	0	0	0.0	—	0	0	0

=== College ===
Statistics
Season	Team	Games		Receiving				Rushing				Kick returns			
Season	Team	GP	GS	Rec	Yards	Avg	TD	Att	Yards	Avg	TD	Ret	Yards	Avg	TD
2020	Michigan	6	0	9	122	13.6	1	1	9	9.0	0	0	0	0.0	0
2021	Michigan	13	5	25	420	**16.8**	3	**3**	**59**	**19.7**	0	1	20	20.0	0
2022	Michigan	12	4	25	376	15.0	4	2	39	19.5	**2**	**5**	**114**	**22.8**	0
2023	Michigan	15	15	**48**	**789**	16.4	**12**	1	10	10.0	0	0	0	0.0	0
Career		46	24	107	1,707	16.0	20	7	117	16.7	2	6	134	22.3	0
