= Patrick Queen =

American football player (born 1999)

- Queen with the Baltimore Ravens in 2021

No. 6 – Pittsburgh Steelers
- Position: Linebacker
- Roster status: Active

Personal information
- Born: August 13, 1999 (age 27); Ventress, Louisiana, U.S.
- Listed height: 6 ft 0 in (1.83 m)
- Listed weight: 230 lb (104 kg)

Career information
- High school: Livonia (Livonia, Louisiana)
- College: LSU (2017–2019)
- NFL draft: 2020: 1st round, 28th overall pick

Career history
- Baltimore Ravens (2020–2023); Pittsburgh Steelers (2024–present)

Awards and highlights
- Second-team All-Pro (2023); 2× Pro Bowl (2023, 2024); PFWA All-Rookie Team (2020); CFP national champion (2019); CFP National Championship Game Defensive MVP (2019)

Career NFL statistics as of Week 7, 2026
- Total tackles: 751
- Sacks: 16.5
- Forced fumbles: 8
- Fumble recoveries: 8
- Pass deflections: 29
- Interceptions: 5
- Defensive touchdowns: 1
- Stats at Pro Football Reference

Patrick Queen (born August 13, 1999) is an American professional football linebacker for the Pittsburgh Steelers of the National Football League (NFL). He played college football for the LSU Tigers and was selected 28th overall by the Baltimore Ravens in the 2020 NFL draft.

== Early life ==
Born to Dwayne and Mary Sue Queen, Queen grew up in Ventress, Louisiana, as the youngest (and only son) out of four children. He played football in middle school at False River Academy before moving on to high school. He later attended Livonia High School, where he played on the football team as both a linebacker and running back. Queen was a member of Livonia High School's 2014 state championship football team. As a senior in 2016, he rushed for 1,487 yards and 19 touchdowns on offense and had 66 tackles, seven tackles for losses, and six passes broken up on defense. Queen participated in the 2014 National Combine, and received first team honors as a cornerback.

Despite his four-star prospect rating, Queen had relatively few offers from Power Five conference schools, particularly the Southeastern Conference, where he had long been interested in playing. Queen's early offers came from smaller schools Tulane, Louisiana, Louisiana–Monroe, Colorado State, McNeese State, Louisiana Tech, and South Florida before receiving offers from Nebraska, Indiana, and his preferred destination of LSU, where he committed without any additional school visits on February 28, 2016. Queen became the first player from Livonia to receive a scholarship from LSU. Queen's recruiting profile was complex, as each major sports recruiting website listed him at a different position. 247Sports, which listed him as a versatile athlete, (Note: Abbreviated as ATH, this is a recruiting designation used when a player is likely to be recruited at a different position than the one they played in high school.) ranked him as the 17th best ATH in the country, and the 12th best player from Louisiana. Rivals, which listed him as an outside linebacker, ranked him as the 13th best OLB in his class and 8th best recruit from Louisiana. ESPN.com, which listed him as a running back, ranked him the 30th best RB in the country and the 14th best recruit from Louisiana.

College recruiting
Name	Hometown	School	Height	Weight	40^{‡}	Commit date
Patrick Queen; LB	Livonia, LA	Livonia (LA)	6 ft 1 in (1.85 m)	204 lb (93 kg)	4.72	Feb 27, 2016
Patrick Queen; LB	Recruit ratings: Rivals: 247Sports: ESPN: (80)					
Overall recruit ranking: Rivals: 214 247Sports: 298 ESPN: N/A
Note: In many cases, Scout, Rivals, 247Sports, On3, and ESPN may conflict in their listings of height and weight.; In these cases, the average was taken. ESPN grades are on a 100-point scale.; Sources: "Patrick Queen, 2017". Rivals.; "2017 Team Ranking". Rivals.com.; "Patrick Queen". 247Sports.

== College career ==
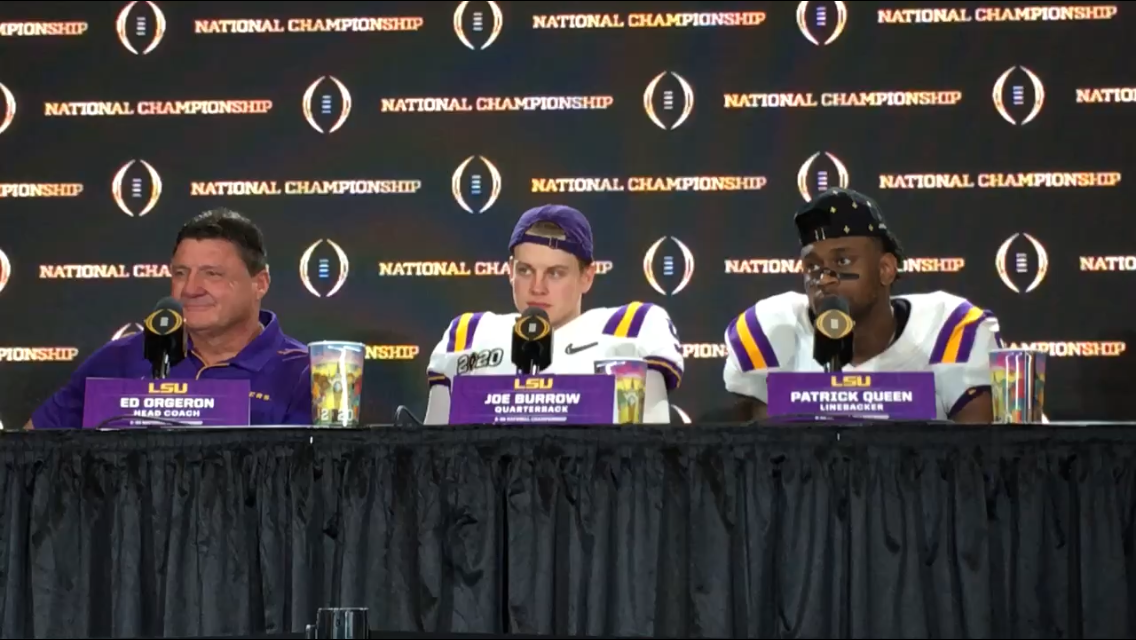
Queen at the post-game presser for the 2020 National Championship game.

Queen made six tackles in 12 games played as a true freshman. He finished his sophomore season with 40 tackles, 5.0 tackles for loss and a sack. Queen entered his junior year on the watchlist for the Butkus Award. Queen finished the regular season with 69 tackles (eight for a loss), 2.5 sacks, three pass deflections, two breakups, an interception and a fumble recovery. Queen was named the Defensive MVP of the 2020 National Championship Game after making eight tackles with 2.5 for a loss and a combined sack against Clemson. Following the end of the season Queen announced that he would forgo his senior season to enter the 2020 NFL draft.

== Professional career ==
Pre-draft measurables
Height	Weight	Arm length	Hand span	Wingspan	40-yard dash	10-yard split	20-yard split	Vertical jump	Broad jump	Bench press
6 ft 0 1/4 in (1.84 m)	229 lb (104 kg)	31 5/8 in (0.80 m)	10 in (0.25 m)	6 ft 4 7/8 in (1.95 m)	4.50 s	1.51 s	2.64 s	35.0 in (0.89 m)	10 ft 5 in (3.18 m)	18 reps
All values from NFL Combine

=== Baltimore Ravens ===
==== 2020 ====
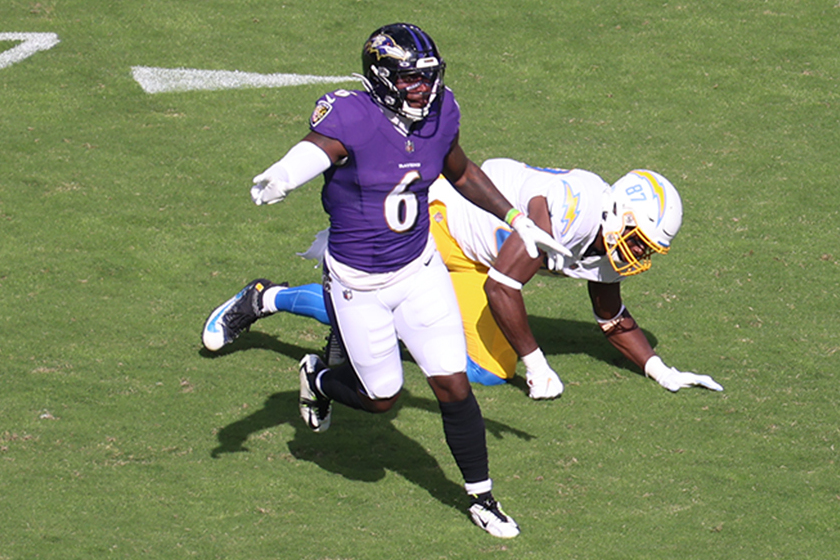
Queen (#6) playing against the Los Angeles Chargers in 2021.

Queen was selected by the Baltimore Ravens with the 28th pick in the first round of the 2020 NFL Draft. He is the first LSU player the Ravens have ever drafted. Queen made his professional debut in a 38–6 win against the Cleveland Browns recording a team high eight tackles, a sack and a forced fumble.

In Week 5 against the Cincinnati Bengals, Queen led the team with nine tackles, recorded a strip sack on former LSU teammate Joe Burrow that he also recovered, and recovered a fumble lost by Mike Thomas which he returned for a 53-yard touchdown during the 27–3 win. On October 14, 2020, Queen was named the AFC Defensive Player of the Week for his performance in Week 5. He was placed on the reserve/COVID-19 list by the team on November 3, 2020, and activated four days later. In Week 13 against the Dallas Cowboys, Queen recorded his first career interception off a pass thrown by Andy Dalton during the 34–17 win. He finished his rookie season starting all 16 games. He recorded 106 total tackles (66 solo), one interception, two passes defended, and two forced fumbles. He was named to the PFWA All-Rookie Team.

==== 2021 ====
In 2021, Queen changed his jersey number from #48 to #6 following the relaxation of the NFL's jersey number rules. In the 2021 season, he started in all 17 games. He finished with two sacks, 98 total tackles (68 solo), one pass defended, and one forced fumble.

==== 2022 ====
In the 2022 season, he started in all 17 games. He recorded five sacks, 117 total tackles (79 solo), two interceptions, six passes defended, and one forced fumble.

==== 2023 ====
Queen had his fifth-year option declined before the season. He would nevertheless set a career-high with 133 total tackles (84 solo) and tied his career-high in pass-breakups. He was named to his first Pro Bowl prior to Week 18.

=== Pittsburgh Steelers ===
==== 2024 ====
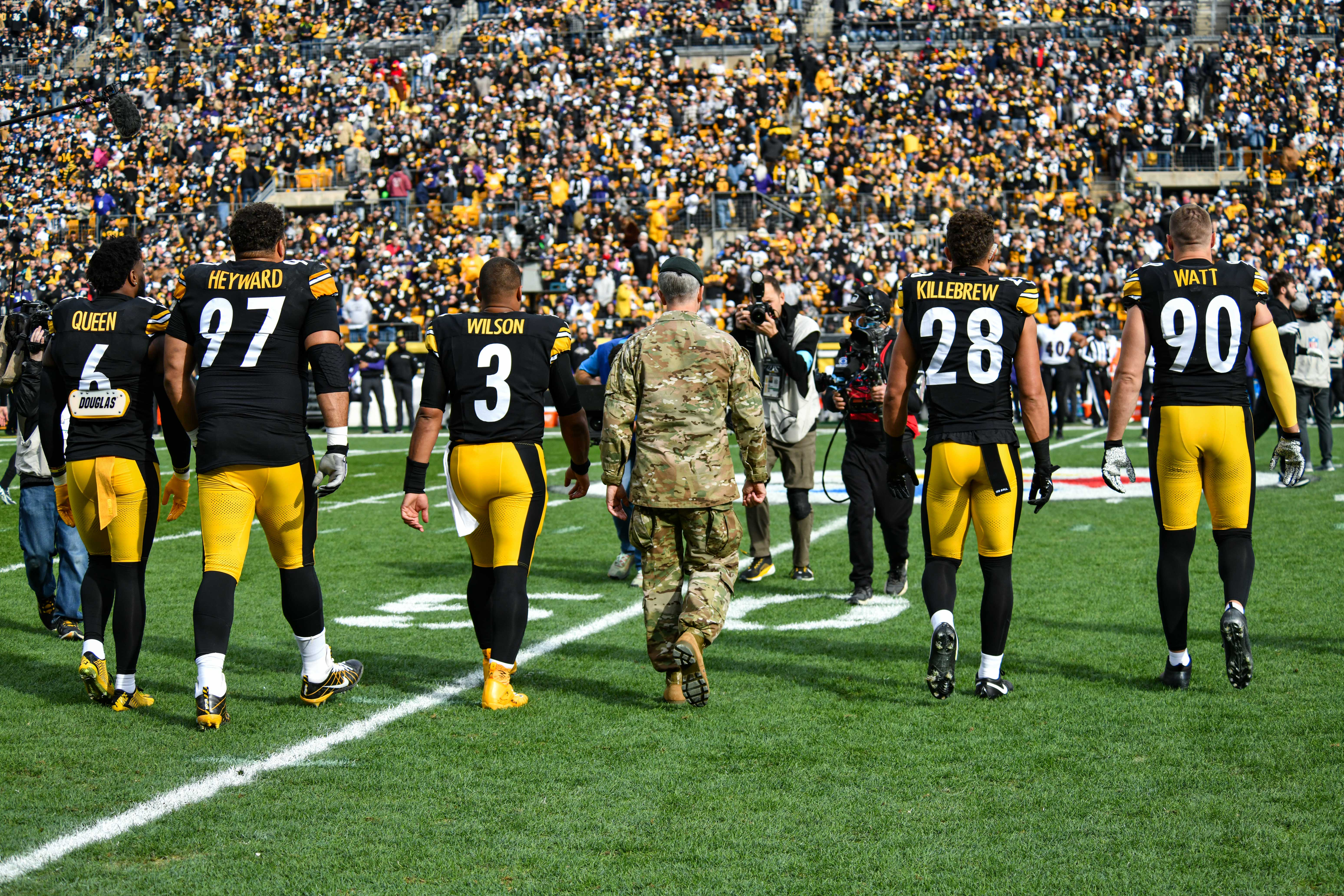
Queen (6) prior to the Week 11 game against the Baltimore Ravens in 2024 with the Steelers

On March 15, 2024, Queen signed a three-year contract with the Pittsburgh Steelers worth $41 million.

Despite a slow start to the season, Queen broke out as a Steeler during the team's 32–13 win over the Raiders when he recorded 13 tackles (six solo, seven assisted), and contributed for 0.5 stuffs. In Week 11, Queen faced off against his former team, the Baltimore Ravens, for the first time since signing with the Steelers. He recorded 10 total tackles, one stuff, and forced a fumble on tight end Isaiah Likely and recovered it for Pittsburgh, to set up a field goal. During a 24–19 loss to divisional opponents Cleveland Browns, Queen was the team's leading tackler. He recorded seven total tackles (two solo and five assisted).

==== 2025 ====
In Week 4's victory over the Minnesota Vikings in Dublin, Queen recorded his first sack of the season on Vikings quarterback Carson Wentz. At the end of the season, Queen received 'The Chief' award, established in honor of Steeler's founder Art Rooney, for best exemplifying the spirit of cooperation with the media.

== Career statistics ==
=== NFL ===
Legend
**Bold**	Career high

==== Regular season ====
Year	Team	Games		Tackles					Interceptions					Fumbles			
Year	Team	G	GS	Comb	Solo	Ast	Sack	TFL	Int	Yds	Lng	TD	PD	FF	FR	Yds	TD
2020	BAL	16	16	106	66	40	3.0	9	1	0	0	0	2	**2**	**2**	**53**	**1**
2021	BAL	17	17	98	68	30	2.0	**10**	0	0	0	0	1	1	1	0	0
2022	BAL	17	17	117	79	38	**5.0**	9	**2**	11	11	0	6	1	**2**	5	0
2023	BAL	17	17	**133**	**84**	49	3.5	9	1	**21**	**21**	0	6	1	1	0	0
2024	PIT	17	17	129	65	**64**	1.0	6	0	0	0	0	**7**	**2**	1	0	0
2025	PIT	17	17	120	56	**64**	1.0	8	0	0	0	0	4	1	1	0	0
2026	PIT	7	7	48	17	31	1.0	2	1	3	3	0	3	0	0	0	0
Career		108	108	751	435	316	16.5	53	5	35	21	0	29	8	8	58	1

==== Postseason ====
Year	Team	Games		Tackles					Interceptions					Fumbles			
Year	Team	G	GS	Comb	Solo	Ast	Sack	TFL	Int	Yds	Lng	TD	PD	FF	FR	Yds	TD
2020	BAL	**2**	1	4	3	1	0.0	0	0	0	0	0	0	0	0	0	0
2022	BAL	1	1	6	4	2	0.0	**1**	0	0	0	0	0	0	0	0	0
2023	BAL	**2**	**2**	**13**	**12**	1	0.0	0	0	0	0	0	0	0	0	0	0
2024	PIT	1	1	10	4	**6**	0.0	**1**	0	0	0	0	0	0	0	0	0
2025	PIT	1	1	10	7	3	0.0	0	0	0	0	0	0	0	0	0	0
Career		7	6	43	30	13	0.0	2	0	0	0	0	0	0	0	0	0

=== College ===
Year	Team	Games		Tackles				Interceptions				Fumbles		
Year	Team	GP	GS	Total	Solo	Ast	Sack	PD	Int	Yds	TD	FF	FR	TD
2017	LSU	12	0	6	2	4	0.0	0	0	0	0	0	0	0
2018	LSU	13	4	40	20	20	1.0	0	0	0	0	0	0	0
2019	LSU	15	11	85	37	48	3.0	2	1	16	0	0	1	0
Career		40	15	131	59	72	4.0	2	1	16	0	0	1	0
