= 2023 Pittsburgh Steelers season =

91st season in franchise history

- Owner: The Rooney Family
- General manager: Omar Khan
- Head coach: Mike Tomlin
- Offensive coordinator: Matt Canada
- Defensive coordinator: Teryl Austin
- Home stadium: Acrisure Stadium

Results
- Record: 10–7
- Division place: 3rd AFC North
- Playoffs: Lost Wild Card Playoffs (at Bills) 17–31
- All-Pros: EDGE T. J. Watt (1st team); ST Miles Killebrew (1st team)
- Pro Bowlers: FS Minkah Fitzpatrick; OLB T. J. Watt; ST Miles Killebrew
- Team MVP: OLB T. J. Watt
- Team ROY: CB Joey Porter Jr.

Uniform
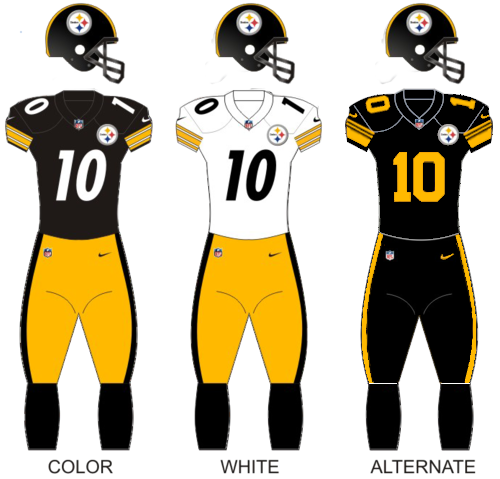

The 2023 season was the Pittsburgh Steelers' 91st in the National Football League (NFL), their 2nd under general manager Omar Khan and their 17th under head coach Mike Tomlin. With their third win of the season against the Ravens in Week 5, the Steelers reached 700 wins in the club's history, joining the Green Bay Packers, Chicago Bears, and New York Giants in reaching 700 franchise victories. With their Week 17 win over the Seattle Seahawks, the Steelers became the first team in AFC history to post 20 consecutive non-losing records. With a Week 18 win over the Baltimore Ravens, the Steelers improved upon their 2022 record, and also qualified for the playoffs after a one-year absence the following day when the Jacksonville Jaguars lost to the Tennessee Titans and the first without Ben Roethlisberger since 2002. The Steelers were defeated in the Wild Card Round by the Buffalo Bills 31–17. For the second time in his career, Kenny Pickett had the lowest number of passing touchdowns among QBs with at least 243 passes. He only threw 6 touchdowns on 324 throws.

The Pittsburgh Steelers drew an average home attendance of 66,977 in 9 home games in the 2023 NFL season.

== Draft ==
2023 Pittsburgh Steelers draft selections
Round	Selection	Player	Position	College	Notes
1	14	Broderick Jones	OT	Georgia	From Patriots (Note: The Steelers traded first- and fourth-round selections (17th and 120th overall) to the New England Patriots in exchange for a first-round selection (14th overall).)
1	17	Traded to the New England Patriots			
2	32	Joey Porter Jr.	CB	Penn State	From Bears (Note: The Steelers traded WR Chase Claypool to the Chicago Bears in exchange for a second-round selection (32nd overall).)
2	49	Keeanu Benton	NT	Wisconsin	
3	80	Traded to the Carolina Panthers (Note: The Steelers traded a third-round selection (80th overall) to the Carolina Panthers in exchange for third- and fourth-round selections (93rd and 132nd overall).)			
3	93	Darnell Washington	TE	Georgia	From 49ers via Panthers
4	120	Traded to the New England Patriots			
4	132	Nick Herbig	ILB	Wisconsin	From 49ers via Panthers
5	151	Traded to the Seattle Seahawks (Note: The Steelers traded a fifth-round selection (151st overall) to the Seattle Seahawks in exchange for CB Ahkello Witherspoon.)			
6	195	Traded to the Denver Broncos (Note: The Steelers traded a sixth-round selection (195th overall) to the Denver Broncos in exchange for a seventh-round selection (241st overall) and LB Malik Reed.)			
7	234	Traded to the Los Angeles Rams (Note: The Steelers traded a seventh-round selection (234th overall) to the Los Angeles Rams in exchange for a seventh-round selection (251st overall) and WR Allen Robinson.)			
7	241	Cory Trice	CB	Purdue	From Vikings via Broncos
7	251	Spencer Anderson	G	Maryland	From Rams

2023 Pittsburgh Steelers undrafted free agents
Position	Player	College
WR	Jordan Byrd	San Diego State
RB	Alfonzo Graham	Morgan State
QB	Tanner Morgan	Minnesota
DT	James Nyamwaya	Merrimack
LB	David Perales	Fresno State
FB	Monte Pottebaum	Iowa
K	B. T. Potter	Clemson

Draft trades

== Staff ==
2023 Pittsburgh Steelers staff
Front office: Owner/president – Art Rooney II; Vice president – Art Rooney Jr.; Vice president of player personnel – Dan Rooney Jr.; General manager – Omar Khan; Assistant general manager – Andy Weidl; Director of player scouting – Mark Sadowski; Director of college scouting – Dan Colbert; Director of pro scouting – Sheldon White; Assistant director of pro scouting – Dave Pettet; Senior scouting assistants – Phil Kreidler, Kelvin Fisher; Director of football administration – Cole Marcoux; Head coaches: Head coach – Mike Tomlin; Offensive coaches: Offensive coordinator – Matt Canada; fired after Week 11; Interim offensive coordinator/running backs – Eddie Faulkner; Quarterbacks – Mike Sullivan; Assistant quarterbacks – David Corley; Wide receivers – Frisman Jackson; Tight ends – Alfredo Roberts; Offensive line – Pat Meyer; Assistant offensive line – Isaac Williams; Offensive assistant – Glenn Thomas	Defensive coaches: Defensive coordinator – Teryl Austin; Defensive line – Karl Dunbar; Outside linebackers – Denzel Martin; Inside linebackers – Aaron Curry; Secondary – Grady Brown; Assistant defensive backs – Gerald Alexander; Defensive quality control – Jason Brooks; Special teams coaches: Special teams coordinator – Danny Smith; Quality control – Matt Tomsho; Strength and conditioning: Senior conditioning coordinator – Garrett Giemont; Head strength and conditioning coach – Marcel Pastoor; Strength and conditioning assistant – Rodain Delus; Director of player development – Darrel Young

== Final roster ==
2023 Pittsburgh Steelers roster
Quarterbacks (QB): 8 Kenny Pickett; 2 Mason Rudolph; 10 Mitchell Trubisky; Running backs (RB): 22 Najee Harris; 48 Godwin Igwebuike; 30 Jaylen Warren; Wide receivers (WR): 19 Calvin Austin; 13 Miles Boykin; 18 Diontae Johnson; 14 George Pickens; 11 Allen Robinson; Tight ends (TE): 88 Pat Freiermuth; 83 Connor Heyward; 80 Darnell Washington; 87 Rodney Williams	Offensive linemen (OL): 74 Spencer Anderson G; 61 Mason Cole C; 60 Dylan Cook T; 78 James Daniels G; 71 Nate Herbig G; 77 Broderick Jones T; 65 Dan Moore T; 76 Chukwuma Okorafor T; 73 Isaac Seumalo G; Defensive linemen (DL): 57 Montravius Adams NT; 95 Keeanu Benton NT; 97 Cameron Heyward DT; 98 DeMarvin Leal DE; 92 Isaiahh Loudermilk DT; 99 Larry Ogunjobi DE; 94 Armon Watts DE	Linebackers (LB): 44 Markus Golden OLB; 51 Nick Herbig OLB; 56 Alex Highsmith OLB; 53 Kyron Johnson ILB; 40 Blake Martinez ILB; 50 Elandon Roberts ILB; 93 Mark Robinson ILB; 38 Mykal Walker ILB; 90 T. J. Watt OLB; Defensive backs (DB): 39 Minkah Fitzpatrick FS; 23 Damontae Kazee SS; 28 Miles Killebrew FS; 20 Patrick Peterson CB; 42 James Pierre CB; 24 Joey Porter Jr. CB; 37 Elijah Riley SS; 21 Darius Rush CB; 34 Chandon Sullivan CB; 29 Levi Wallace CB; Special teams (ST): 9 Chris Boswell K; 6 Pressley Harvin III P; 46 Christian Kuntz LS	Practice squad: 35 Luq Barcoo CB; 45 Jack Colletto FB; 72 Kellen Diesch T; 41 Jalen Elliott SS; 96 Breiden Fehoko NT; 82 Dez Fitzpatrick WR; 16 Myles Jack ILB; 91 Jonathan Marshall DT; 62 Ryan McCollum C; 26 Anthony McFarland Jr. RB; 33 David Perales LB; 15 Denzel Mims WR; 25 Eric Rowe SS; 49 Jaylon Smith ILB; 85 Duece Watts WR; 3 Brad Wing P; Reserve: 54 Kwon Alexander ILB (IR); -- Alfonzo Graham RB (IR); 55 Cole Holcomb ILB (IR); 31 Keanu Neal SS (IR); -- Chapelle Russell OLB (IR); 17 Trenton Thompson FS (IR); 27 Cory Trice CB (IR); -- Renell Wren NT (IR); Rookies in italics

== Preseason ==
The Steelers' preseason opponents and schedule were announced in the spring. All preseason games were televised on KDKA. Their finale against the Falcons was also broadcast nationally on NFL Network.

Week	Date	Opponent	Result	Record	Venue	Recap
1	August 11	at Tampa Bay Buccaneers	W 27–17	1–0	Raymond James Stadium	Recap
2	August 19	Buffalo Bills	W 27–15	2–0	Acrisure Stadium	Recap
3	August 24	at Atlanta Falcons	W 24–0	3–0	Mercedes-Benz Stadium	Recap

== Regular season ==
=== Schedule ===
Week	Date	Opponent	Result	Record	Venue	Recap
1	September 10	San Francisco 49ers	**L** 7–30	0–1	Acrisure Stadium	Recap
2	September 18	**Cleveland Browns**	**W** 26–22	1–1	Acrisure Stadium	Recap
3	September 24	at Las Vegas Raiders	**W** 23–18	2–1	Allegiant Stadium	Recap
4	October 1	at Houston Texans	**L** 6–30	2–2	NRG Stadium	Recap
5	October 8	**Baltimore Ravens**	**W** 17–10	3–2	Acrisure Stadium	Recap
6	Bye					
7	October 22	at Los Angeles Rams	**W** 24–17	4–2	SoFi Stadium	Recap
8	October 29	Jacksonville Jaguars	**L** 10–20	4–3	Acrisure Stadium	Recap
9	November 2	Tennessee Titans	**W** 20–16	5–3	Acrisure Stadium	Recap
10	November 12	Green Bay Packers	**W** 23–19	6–3	Acrisure Stadium	Recap
11	November 19	at **Cleveland Browns**	**L** 10–13	6–4	Cleveland Browns Stadium	Recap
12	November 26	at **Cincinnati Bengals**	**W** 16–10	7–4	Paycor Stadium	Recap
13	December 3	Arizona Cardinals	**L** 10–24	7–5	Acrisure Stadium	Recap
14	December 7	New England Patriots	**L** 18–21	7–6	Acrisure Stadium	Recap
15	December 16	at Indianapolis Colts	**L** 13–30	7–7	Lucas Oil Stadium	Recap
16	December 23	**Cincinnati Bengals**	**W** 34–11	8–7	Acrisure Stadium	Recap
17	December 31	at Seattle Seahawks	**W** 30–23	9–7	Lumen Field	Recap
18	January 6	at **Baltimore Ravens**	**W** 17–10	10–7	M&T Bank Stadium	Recap

Note: Intra-division opponents are in bold text.

=== Game summaries ===
==== Week 1: vs. San Francisco 49ers ====
Week 1: San Francisco 49ers at Pittsburgh Steelers – Game summary

Quarter	1	2	3	4	Total
**49ers**	10	10	7	3	**30**
Steelers	0	7	0	0	**7**

at Acrisure Stadium, Pittsburgh, Pennsylvania

- Date: September 10
- Game time: 1:00 p.m. EDT
- Game weather: Cloudy, 72 °F (22 °C)
- Game attendance: 67,679
- Referee: Alex Kemp
- TV announcers (Fox): Joe Davis, Daryl Johnston and Pam Oliver
- Recap, Game Book

Game information

**First quarter**

- SF – Brandon Aiyuk 8-yard pass from Brock Purdy (Jake Moody kick), 9:29. 49ers 7–0. **Drive: 7 plays, 54 yards, 3:46.**
- SF – Jake Moody 41-yard field goal, 4:38. 49ers 10–0. **Drive: 6 plays, 25 yards, 3:22.**

**Second quarter**

- SF – Brandon Aiyuk 19-yard pass from Brock Purdy (Jake Moody kick), 13:30. 49ers 17–0. **Drive: 9 plays, 68 yards, 4:35.**
- SF – Jake Moody 32-yard field goal, 8:22. 49ers 20–0. **Drive: 7 plays, 37 yards, 3:55.**
- PIT – Pat Freiermuth 3-yard pass from Kenny Pickett (Chris Boswell kick), 0:10. 49ers 20–7. **Drive: 12 plays, 95 yards, 1:25.**

**Third quarter**

- SF – Christian McCaffrey 65-yard run (Jake Moody kick), 14:02. 49ers 27–7. **Drive: 2 plays, 75 yards, 0:58.**

**Fourth quarter**

- SF – Jake Moody 40-yard field goal, 5:30. 49ers 30–7. **Drive: 9 plays, 29 yards, 4:38.**

**Top passers**

- SF – Brock Purdy – 19/29, 220 yards, 2 TD
- PIT – Kenny Pickett – 31/46, 232 yards, TD, 2 INT

**Top rushers**

- SF – Christian McCaffrey – 22 rushes, 151 yards, TD
- PIT – Najee Harris – 6 rushes, 31 yards

**Top receivers**

- SF – Brandon Aiyuk – 8 receptions, 129 yards, 2 TD
- PIT – Allen Robinson – 5 receptions, 64 yards

The Steelers opened their season at home for the first time since 2014. The team was blown out by the 49ers 30–7, and suffered their worst loss at home since 2006. With the loss, the Steelers started 0–1.

==== Week 2: vs. Cleveland Browns ====
Week 2: Cleveland Browns at Pittsburgh Steelers – Game summary

Quarter	1	2	3	4	Total
Browns	3	11	8	0	**22**
**Steelers**	7	9	3	7	**26**

at Acrisure Stadium, Pittsburgh, Pennsylvania

- Date: September 18
- Game time: 8:15 p.m. EDT
- Game weather: Clear, 62 °F (17 °C)
- Game attendance: 67,576
- Referee: Ronald Torbert
- TV announcers (ABC): Joe Buck, Troy Aikman and Lisa Salters
- Recap, Game Book

Game information

**First quarter**

- PIT – Alex Highsmith 30-yard interception return (Chris Boswell kick), 14:51. Steelers 7–0.
- CLE – Dustin Hopkins 43-yard field goal, 8:46. Steelers 7–3. **Drive: 11 plays, 50 yards, 6:05.**

**Second quarter**

- CLE – Jerome Ford 2-yard pass from Deshaun Watson (Jerome Ford 2-point run), 14:02. Browns 11–7. **Drive: 4 plays, 23 yards, 1:06.**
- PIT – Chris Boswell 52-yard field goal, 9:11. Browns 11–10. **Drive: 4 plays, 5 yards, 1:20.**
- PIT – George Pickens 71-yard pass from Kenny Pickett (run failed), 6:05. Steelers 16–11. **Drive: 4 plays, 82 yards, 1:36.**
- CLE – Dustin Hopkins 55-yard field goal, 0:22. Steelers 16–14. **Drive: 7 plays, 38 yards, 2:24.**

**Third quarter**

- PIT – Chris Boswell 50-yard field goal, 11:47. Steelers 19–14. **Drive: 9 plays, 44 yards, 3:13.**
- CLE – Pierre Strong Jr. 1-yard run (Deshaun Watson run), 10:01. Browns 22–19. **Drive: 4 plays, 75 yards, 1:46.**

**Fourth quarter**

- PIT – T. J. Watt 16-yard fumble return (Chris Boswell kick), 6:58. Steelers 26–22.

**Top passers**

- CLE – Deshaun Watson – 22/40, 235 yards, TD, INT
- PIT – Kenny Pickett – 15/30, 222 yards, TD, INT

**Top rushers**

- CLE – Jerome Ford – 16 rushes, 106 yards
- PIT – Najee Harris – 10 rushes, 43 yards

**Top receivers**

- CLE – Amari Cooper – 7 receptions, 90 yards
- PIT – George Pickens – 4 receptions, 127 yards, TD

The Steelers opened their season with two home games for the first time since 1997.

Alex Highsmith opened the scoring 9 seconds in with a 30-yard pick-six. However, just over 6 minutes later, Dustin Hopkins kicked a 43-yard field goal to cut Pittsburgh's lead to 4 points.

In the second quarter, the Steelers trailed for the first time when Browns quarterback Deshaun Watson hit Jerome Ford with a 4-yard touchdown pass followed by a two-point conversion to make the score 11–7 in favor of the Browns. Chris Boswell kicked a 52-yard field goal to bring Pittsburgh within one point. Kenny Pickett then hit George Pickens with a 71-yard touchdown pass to put the Steelers back up, 16–11. The Browns made it a 2-point game when Dustin Hopkins kicked a 55-yard field goal just before halftime.

In the third quarter, Chris Boswell pushed the Steelers' lead back to five points by converting a 50-yard field goal. However, Pierre Strong Jr. ran for a 1-yard touchdown, with a 2-point conversion, to put the Browns up, 22–19, 1 minute and 46 seconds later.

In the fourth quarter, with 6:58 to go, T. J. Watt recorded a 16-yard fumble return for a touchdown, to reach the final score of 26–22 in favor of Pittsburgh.

With the win, the Steelers improved to 1–1. The Steelers' defense sacked Deshaun Watson 6 times for 25 yards.

Despite the win, the Steelers allowed 408 yards of offense and 20 first downs, while only picking up 255 yards of offense and 9 first downs.

==== Week 3: at Las Vegas Raiders ====
Week 3: Pittsburgh Steelers at Las Vegas Raiders – Game summary

Quarter	1	2	3	4	Total
**Steelers**	7	6	10	0	**23**
Raiders	7	0	0	11	**18**

at Allegiant Stadium, Paradise, Nevada

- Date: September 24
- Game time: 8:20 p.m. EDT/5:20 p.m. PDT
- Game weather: None (indoor stadium)
- Game attendance: 62,541
- Referee: Tra Blake
- TV announcers (NBC): Mike Tirico, Cris Collinsworth and Melissa Stark
- Recap, Game Book

Game information

**First quarter**

- LV – Davante Adams 32-yard pass from Jimmy Garoppolo (Daniel Carlson kick), 7:04. Raiders 7–0. **Drive: 7 plays, 74 yards, 3:23.**
- PIT – Calvin Austin 72-yard pass from Kenny Pickett (Chris Boswell kick), 6:12. Tied 7–7. **Drive: 3 plays, 75 yards, 0:52.**

**Second quarter**

- PIT – Chris Boswell 43-yard field goal, 8:33. Steelers 10–7. **Drive: 8 plays, 44 yards, 3:51.**
- PIT – Chris Boswell 42-yard field goal, 1:56. Steelers 13–7. **Drive: 11 plays, 54 yards, 5:08.**

**Third quarter**

- PIT – Chris Boswell 57-yard field goal, 9:28. Steelers 16–7. **Drive: 9 plays, 52 yards, 4:29.**
- PIT – Pat Freiermuth 13-yard pass from Kenny Pickett (Chris Boswell kick), 3:56. Steelers 23–7. **Drive: 6 plays, 81 yards, 3:19.**

**Fourth quarter**

- LV – Davante Adams 1-yard pass from Jimmy Garoppolo (Michael Mayer pass from Jimmy Garoppolo), 5:41. Steelers 23–15. **Drive: 11 plays, 80 yards, 5:51.**
- LV – Daniel Carlson 26-yard field goal, 2:22. Steelers 23–18. **Drive: 9 plays, 44 yards, 2:13.**

**Top passers**

- PIT – Kenny Pickett – 16/28, 235 yards, 2 TD
- LV – Jimmy Garoppolo – 28/44, 324 yards, 2 TD, 3 INT

**Top rushers**

- PIT – Najee Harris – 19 rushes, 65 yards
- LV – Josh Jacobs – 17 rushes, 62 yards

**Top receivers**

- PIT – George Pickens – 4 receptions, 75 yards
- LV – Davante Adams – 13 receptions, 172 yards, 2 TD

The Steelers upset the Raiders, winning in Las Vegas for the first time ever under the new Raiders city moniker. They also beat the Raiders on the road for the first time since 1995 when the Raiders were based in Oakland. With the win, the Steelers improved to 2–1, and moved into a three-way tie for first in the AFC North with the Ravens and Browns. It was Kenny Pickett's first game of the season without throwing an interception, and his first career game with multiple TD passes. Also, with the win, the Steelers have won at least one road game against all other 15 AFC teams since Mike Tomlin's hiring.

==== Week 4: at Houston Texans ====
Week 4: Pittsburgh Steelers at Houston Texans – Game summary

Quarter	1	2	3	4	Total
Steelers	0	0	6	0	**6**
**Texans**	10	6	0	14	**30**

at NRG Stadium, Houston, Texas

- Date: October 1
- Game time: 1:00 p.m. EDT/12:00 p.m. CDT
- Game weather: None (retractable roof closed)
- Game attendance: 71,399
- Referee: Bill Vinovich
- TV announcers (CBS): Spero Dedes, Adam Archuleta and Amanda Renner
- Recap, Game Book

Game information

**First quarter**

- HOU – Nico Collins 2-yard pass from C. J. Stroud (Kaʻimi Fairbairn kick), 8:55. Texans 7–0. **Drive: 12 plays, 69 yards, 6:05.**
- HOU – Kaʻimi Fairbairn 36-yard field goal, 1:20. Texans 10–0. **Drive: 9 plays, 27 yards, 3:26.**

**Second quarter**

- HOU – Kaʻimi Fairbairn 38-yard field goal, 12:09. Texans 13–0. **Drive: 7 plays, 48 yards, 2:43.**
- HOU – Kaʻimi Fairbairn 39-yard field goal, 0:00. Texans 16–0. **Drive: 5 plays, 57 yards, 0:41.**

**Third quarter**

- PIT – Chris Boswell 35-yard field goal, 9:31. Texans 16–3. **Drive: 10 plays, 58 yards, 5:29.**
- PIT – Chris Boswell 23-yard field goal, 5:47. Texans 16–6. **Drive: 7 plays, 41 yards, 2:53.**

**Fourth quarter**

- HOU – Dalton Schultz 6-yard pass from Devin Singletary (Kaʻimi Fairbairn kick), 10:50. Texans 23–6. **Drive: 10 plays, 58 yards, 5:20.**
- HOU – Nico Collins 52-yard pass from C. J. Stroud (Kaʻimi Fairbairn kick), 3:39. Texans 30–6. **Drive: 11 plays, 86 yards, 6:24.**

**Top passers**

- PIT – Kenny Pickett – 15/23, 114 yards, INT
- HOU – C. J. Stroud – 16/30, 306 yards, 2 TD

**Top rushers**

- PIT – Najee Harris – 14 rushes, 71 yards
- HOU – Dameon Pierce – 24 rushes, 81 yards

**Top receivers**

- PIT – Najee Harris – 1 reception, 32 yards
- HOU – Nico Collins – 7 receptions, 168 yards, 2 TD

The Steelers continued their road trip, traveling to take on the Texans in which would be their second loss of the season, being blown out 30–6. With the upset loss, the Steelers fell to 2–2. They lost to the Texans for just the third time ever. On a side note, T. J. Watt was able to witness his brother get inducted into the Houston Texans' Ring of Honor.

==== Week 5: vs. Baltimore Ravens ====
Week 5: Baltimore Ravens at Pittsburgh Steelers – Game summary

Quarter	1	2	3	4	Total
Ravens	7	3	0	0	**10**
**Steelers**	0	3	0	14	**17**

at Acrisure Stadium, Pittsburgh, Pennsylvania

- Date: October 8
- Game time: 1:00 p.m. EDT
- Game weather: Partly cloudy, 53 °F (12 °C)
- Game attendance: 67,272
- Referee: Carl Cheffers
- TV announcers (CBS): Ian Eagle, Charles Davis and Evan Washburn
- Recap, Game Book

Game information

**First quarter**

- BAL – Justice Hill 14-yard run (Justin Tucker kick), 6:15. Ravens 7–0. **Drive: 7 play, 59 yards, 2:57.**

**Second quarter**

- BAL – Justin Tucker 33-yard field goal, 12:23. Ravens 10–0. **Drive: 15 plays, 63 yards, 7:22.**
- PIT – Chris Boswell 43-yard field goal, 3:16. Ravens 10–3. **Drive: 7 plays, 59 yards, 2:57.**

**Third quarter**

- No scoring plays.

**Fourth quarter**

- PIT – Punt blocked by Miles Killebrew out of bounds in end zone for a safety, 11:12. Ravens 10–5.
- PIT – Chris Boswell 25-yard field goal, 7:10. Ravens 10–8. **Drive: 9 plays, 49 yards, 4:02.**
- PIT – George Pickens 41-yard pass from Kenny Pickett (pass failed), 1:17. Steelers 14–10. **Drive: 8 plays, 80 yards, 2:49.**
- PIT – Chris Boswell 42-yard field goal, 0:49. Steelers 17–10. **Drive: 4 plays, 6 yards, 0:13.**

**Top passers**

- BAL – Lamar Jackson – 22/38, 236 yards, INT
- PIT – Kenny Pickett – 18/32, 224 yards, TD

**Top rushers**

- BAL – Gus Edwards – 12 rushes, 48 yards
- PIT – Jaylen Warren – 9 rushes, 40 yards

**Top receivers**

- BAL – Zay Flowers – 5 receptions, 73 yards
- PIT – George Pickens – 6 receptions, 130 yards, TD

The Steelers went home for Round 1 against the Ravens. The Ravens went up 10–0 in the second quarter before the Steelers managed to score the remaining points to win 17–10. The win improved them to 3–2 as they headed into their bye week.

==== Week 7: at Los Angeles Rams ====
Week 7: Pittsburgh Steelers at Los Angeles Rams – Game summary

Quarter	1	2	3	4	Total
**Steelers**	0	3	7	14	**24**
Rams	0	9	8	0	**17**

at SoFi Stadium, Inglewood, California

- Date: October 22
- Game time: 4:05 p.m. EDT/1:05 p.m. PDT
- Game weather: Sunny, 74 °F (23 °C) (retractable roof open)
- Game attendance: 73,471
- Referee: Craig Wrolstad
- TV announcers (Fox): Adam Amin, Daryl Johnston and Pam Oliver
- Recap, Game Book

Game information

**First quarter**

- No scoring plays.

**Second quarter**

- PIT – Chris Boswell 53-yard field goal, 14:51. Steelers 3–0. **Drive: 8 plays, 22 yards, 3:44.**
- LAR – Brett Maher 41-yard field goal 5:56. Tied 3–3. **Drive: 8 plays, 38 yards, 4:11.**
- LAR – Tutu Atwell 31-yard pass from Matthew Stafford (kick failed), 0:17. Rams 9–3. **Drive: 8 plays, 88 yards, 3:29.**

**Third quarter**

- PIT – Kenny Pickett 1-yard run (Chris Boswell kick), 13:19. Steelers 10–9. **Drive: 3 plays, 7 yards, 1:25.**
- LAR – Darrell Henderson 1-yard run (Matthew Stafford–Cooper Kupp pass), 8:57. Rams 17–10. **Drive: 9 plays, 75 yards, 4:22.**

**Fourth quarter**

- PIT – Jaylen Warren 13-yard run (Chris Boswell kick), 13:49. Tied 17–17. **Drive: 5 plays, 59 yards, 2:33.**
- PIT – Najee Harris 3-yard run (Chris Boswell kick), 7:20. Steelers 24–17. **Drive: 10 plays, 80 yards, 5:16.**

**Top passers**

- PIT – Kenny Pickett – 17/25, 230 yards
- LAR – Matthew Stafford – 14/29, 231 yards, TD, INT

**Top rushers**

- PIT – Najee Harris – 14 rushes, 53 yards, TD
- LAR – Darrell Henderson – 18 rushes, 61 yards, TD

**Top receivers**

- PIT – George Pickens – 5 receptions, 107 yards
- LAR – Puka Nacua – 8 receptions, 154 yards

Coming off of their bye week, the Steelers then went on the road to take on the Rams. After a scoreless first quarter, the Steelers scored first when Chris Boswell kicked a 53-yard field goal to make it 3–0. Though, the Rams would take the lead before halftime when their kicker Brett Maher tied the game with a 41-yard field goal, followed by a 31-yard touchdown pass from Matthew Stafford to Tutu Atwell (with a failed PAT) to make it 9–3. In the third quarter, the Steelers retook the lead when Kenny Pickett ran for a 1-yard touchdown to make it 10–9. However, the Rams took the lead back when Darrell Henderson Jr. ran for a 1-yard touchdown (with a successful 2-point conversion) to make it 17–10. In the fourth quarter, it was all Steelers as they would win the game 24–17 with a pair of rushing touchdowns from Jaylen Warren from 13 yards out and Najee Harris from 3 yards out.

With the win, the Steelers improved to 4–2 and had defeated the Rams for the fifth time in a row, not having lost to them since the 2003 season when the Rams were based in St. Louis.

==== Week 8: vs. Jacksonville Jaguars ====
Week 8: Jacksonville Jaguars at Pittsburgh Steelers – Game summary

Quarter	1	2	3	4	Total
**Jaguars**	6	3	8	3	**20**
Steelers	0	3	7	0	**10**

at Acrisure Stadium, Pittsburgh, Pennsylvania

- Date: October 29
- Game time: 1:00 p.m. EDT
- Game weather: Rain, 58 °F (14 °C)
- Game attendance: 67,225
- Referee: Alan Eck
- TV announcers (CBS): Ian Eagle, Charles Davis and Evan Washburn
- Recap, Game Book

Game information

**First quarter**

- JAX – Brandon McManus 50-yard field goal, 10:47. Jaguars 3–0. **Drive: 6 plays, 21 yards, 3:16.**
- JAX – Brandon McManus 51-yard field goal, 5:54. Jaguars 6–0. **Drive: 7 plays, 36 yards, 3:29.**

**Second quarter**

- PIT – Chris Boswell 22-yard field goal, 3:59. Jaguars 6–3. **Drive: 12 plays, 93 yards, 6:16.**
- JAX – Brandon McManus 38-yard field goal, 1:04. Jaguars 9–3. **Drive: 9 plays, 43 yards, 2:55.**

**Third quarter**

- JAX – Travis Etienne 56-yard pass from Trevor Lawrence (Travis Etienne run), 5:05. Jaguars 17–3. **Drive: 2 plays, 56 yards, 0:13.**
- PIT – George Pickens 22-yard pass from Mitch Trubisky (Chris Boswell kick), 0:53. Jaguars 17–10. **Drive: 8 plays, 75 yards, 4:12.**

**Fourth quarter**

- JAX – Brandon McManus 37-yard field goal, 4:35. Jaguars 20–10. **Drive: 7 plays, 40 yards, 4:45.**

**Top passers**

- JAX – Trevor Lawrence – 24/32, 292 yards, TD, INT
- PIT – Mitch Trubisky – 15/27, 138 yards, TD, 2 INT

**Top rushers**

- JAX – Travis Etienne – 24 rushes, 79 yards
- PIT – Jaylen Warren – 5 rushes, 19 yards

**Top receivers**

- JAX – Evan Engram – 10 receptions, 88 yards
- PIT – Diontae Johnson – 8 receptions, 85 yards

After a tough road win, the Steelers returned home for a game against the Jaguars. Brandon McManus got the Jaguars on the board 6–0 with field goals from 50 and 51 yards out. In the second quarter, the Steelers made it 6–3 when Chris Boswell kicked a 22-yard field goal of his own. However, McManus kicked his third field goal of the game from 38 yards out to put his team up 9–3 at halftime. In the third quarter, the Jaguars moved up by double digits when Travis Etienne caught a 56-yard touchdown pass from Trevor Lawrence (with a successful 2-point conversion) to make it 17–3. The Steelers responded later on in the quarter shortening the lead to 17–10 by way of Mitchell Trubisky's 22-yard touchdown pass to George Pickens. The Jaguars were able to seal the victory in the fourth quarter however with McManus kicking his fourth field goal of the day from 37 yards out to make the final score 20–10.

With the loss, the Steelers fell to 4–3.

==== Week 9: vs. Tennessee Titans ====
Week 9: Tennessee Titans at Pittsburgh Steelers – Game summary

Quarter	1	2	3	4	Total
Titans	3	10	3	0	**16**
**Steelers**	7	3	3	7	**20**

at Acrisure Stadium, Pittsburgh, Pennsylvania

- Date: November 2
- Game time: 8:15 p.m. EST
- Game weather: Mostly clear, 40 °F (4 °C)
- Game attendance: 65,969
- Referee: John Hussey
- TV announcers (WPXI/Prime Video): Al Michaels, Kirk Herbstreit and Kaylee Hartung
- Recap, Game Book

Game information

**First quarter**

- PIT – Najee Harris 10-yard run (Chris Boswell kick), 10:11. Steelers 7–0. **Drive: 10 plays, 78 yards, 4:49.**
- TEN — Nick Folk 36-yard field goal, 2:48. Steelers 7–3. **Drive: 14 plays, 72 yards, 7:23.**

**Second quarter**

- TEN — Derrick Henry 2-yard run (Nick Folk kick), 6:35. Titans 10–7. **Drive: 11 plays, 73 yards, 6:26.**
- PIT – Chris Boswell 29-yard field goal, 1:16. Tied 10–10. **Drive: 10 plays, 65 yards, 5:19.**
- TEN – Nick Folk 36-yard field goal, 0:00. Titans 13–10. **Drive: 8 plays, 57 yards, 1:16.**

**Third quarter**

- PIT – Chris Boswell 30-yard field goal, 5:41. Tied 13–13. **Drive: 15 plays, 75 yards, 8:17.**
- TEN – Nick Folk 48-yard field goal, 0:19. Titans 16–13. **Drive: 9 plays, 45 yards, 5:22.**

**Fourth quarter**

- PTT — Diontae Johnson 3-yard pass from Kenny Pickett (Chris Boswell kick), 4:02. Steelers 20–16. **Drive: 11 plays, 92 yards, 5:11.**

**Top passers**

- TEN – Will Levis – 22/39, 262 yards, INT
- PIT – Kenny Pickett – 19/30, 160 yards, TD

**Top rushers**

- TEN – Derrick Henry – 17 rushes, 75 yards, TD
- PIT – Jaylen Warren – 11 rushes, 88 yards

**Top receivers**

- TEN – Kyle Philips – 4 receptions, 68 yards
- PIT – Diontae Johnson – 7 receptions, 90 yards, TD

After a tough loss at home, the Steelers stayed at home for a Thursday Night game against the Titans. The Steelers scored first in the first quarter when Najee Harris ran for a 10-yard touchdown to make it 7–0. The Titans got on the board later on when Nick Folk kicked a 36-yard field goal to make it 7–3. In the second quarter, the Titans moved into the lead 10–7 by way of a 2-yard touchdown run by Derrick Henry. Though, the Steelers tied it at 10–10 when Chris Boswell kicked a 29-yard field goal. The Titans moved back into the lead at halftime Folk kicked another 36-yard field goal to make it 13–10. After the break, the Steelers tied it up in the third quarter 13–13 when Boswell kicked a 30-yard field goal. Later on though, the Titans took the lead back when Nick Folk kicked a 48-yard field goal to make the score 16–13. In the fourth quarter, the Steelers scored the eventual game-winning touchdown to make the final score 20–16. They narrowly escaped with the victory when Kwon Alexander intercepted a pass by Will Levis in the end zone with six seconds left in the game.

With the win, the Steelers improved to 5–3.

==== Week 10: vs. Green Bay Packers ====
Week 10: Green Bay Packers at Pittsburgh Steelers – Game summary

Quarter	1	2	3	4	Total
Packers	7	6	6	0	**19**
**Steelers**	7	10	3	3	**23**

at Acrisure Stadium, Pittsburgh, Pennsylvania

- Date: November 12
- Game time: 1:00 p.m. EST
- Game weather: Partly cloudy, 50 °F (10 °C)
- Game attendance: 67,617
- Referee: Scott Novak
- TV announcers (CBS): Ian Eagle, Charles Davis and Evan Washburn
- Recap, Game Book

Game information

**First quarter**

- PIT – Najee Harris 4-yard run (Chris Boswell kick), 10:01. Steelers 7–0. **Drive: 9 plays, 75 yards, 4:59.**
- GB - Romeo Doubs 8 yard pass from Jordan Love (Anders Carlson kick), 4:42. Tied 7–7. **Drive: 10 plays, 69 yards, 5:19.**

**Second Quarter**

- PIT - Jaylen Warren 16-yard run (Chris Boswell kick), 14:12. Steelers 14–7. **Drive: 11 plays, 60 yards, 5:30.**
- PIT - Chris Boswell 42-yard field goal, 8:08. Steelers 17–7. **Drive: 8 plays, 30 yards, 4:58.**
- GB - Jayden Reed 35-yard pass from Jordan Love (kick blocked), 4:14. Steelers 17–13. **Drive: 7 plays, 87 yards, 3:54.**

**Third Quarter**

- GB - Anders Carlson 31-yard field goal, 9:08. Steelers 17–16. **Drive: 11 plays, 31 yards, 5:52.**
- GB - Anders Carlson 28-yard field goal, 3:04. Packers 19–17. **Drive: 9 plays, 68 yards, 4:06.**
- PIT - Chris Boswell 49-yard field goal, 1:05. Steelers 20–19. **Drive: 5 plays, 35 yards, 1:59.**

**Fourth Quarter**

- PIT - Chris Boswell 35-yard field goal, 5:14. Steelers 23–19. **Drive: 8 plays, 49 yards, 4:10.**

**Top passers**

- GB – Jordan Love – 21/40, 289 yards, 2 TD, 2 INT
- PIT – Kenny Pickett – 14/23, 126 yards

**Top rushers**

- GB – A. J. Dillon – 9 rushes, 70 yards
- PIT – Jaylen Warren – 15 rushes, 101 yards

**Top receivers**

- GB – Jayden Reed – 5 receptions, 84 yards, TD
- PIT – George Pickens – 3 receptions, 45 yards

After yet another tough win, the Steelers stayed home for a game against the Packers. The Steelers scored first in the first quarter when Najee Harris ran for a 4-yard touchdown to take a 7–0 lead. The Packers were able to tie it up later on when Jordan Love found Romeo Doubs on an 8-yard pass to make it 7–7. The Steelers score twice in the second quarter to move up by 10: Jaylen Warren's 16-yard touchdown run, followed up by Chris Boswell's 42-yard field goal to make it 17–7. The Packers were able to come within 4 before halftime when Love connected with Jayden Reed for a 35-yard pass (with a failed PAT) to make it 17–13 at halftime. In the third quarter, the Packers went back to work taking a 2-point lead when Anders Carlson kicked 2 field goals from 31 and 28 yards out to make it 19–17. The Steelers retook the lead later on in the quarter when Boswell kicked a 49-yard field goal to make it 20–19. The Steelers wrapped up scoring of the game when Boswell kicked a 35-yard field goal to make it 23–19. The Packers got the ball back, but in a similar close ending to the Steelers' win over the Tennessee Titans the previous week, Damontae Kazee intercepted a potential game-winning touchdown pass by Love outside the Steelers end zone as time expired, sealing another narrow victory for the Steelers.

With the win, the Steelers improved to 6–3.

==== Week 11: at Cleveland Browns ====
Week 11: Pittsburgh Steelers at Cleveland Browns – Game summary

Quarter	1	2	3	4	Total
Steelers	0	0	7	3	**10**
**Browns**	7	3	0	3	**13**

at Cleveland Browns Stadium, Cleveland, Ohio

- Date: November 19
- Game time: 1:00 p.m. EST
- Game weather: Sunny, 48 °F (9 °C)
- Game attendance: 67,919
- Referee: Shawn Hochuli
- TV announcers (CBS): Ian Eagle, Charles Davis and Evan Washburn
- Recap, Game Book

Game information

**First quarter**

- CLE – Jerome Ford 1-yard run (Dustin Hopkins kick), 4:35. Browns 7–0. **Drive: 7 plays, 50 yards, 3:49.**

**Second quarter**

- CLE – Dustin Hopkins 25-yard field goal, 0:05. Browns 10–0. **Drive: 17 plays, 77 yards, 5:24.**

**Third quarter**

- PIT – Jaylen Warren 74-yard run (Chris Boswell kick), 14:10. Browns 10–7. **Drive: 2 plays, 75 yards, 0:50.**

**Fourth quarter**

- PIT – Chris Boswell 28-yard field goal, 7:40. Tied 10–10. **Drive: 13 plays, 62 yards, 7:10.**
- CLE – Dustin Hopkins 34-yard field goal, 0:02. Browns 13–10. **Drive: 8 plays, 48 yards, 1:16.**

**Top passers**

- CLE – Dorian Thompson-Robinson – 24/43, 165 yards, INT
- PIT – Kenny Pickett – 15/28, 106 yards

**Top rushers**

- CLE – Kareem Hunt – 12 rushes, 36 yards
- PIT – Jaylen Warren – 9 rushes, 129 yards, TD

**Top receivers**

- CLE – Elijah Moore – 6 receptions, 60 yards
- PIT – George Pickens – 4 receptions, 38 yards

The Steelers then traveled to Cleveland for Round 2 against the 6–3 Browns. The first half scoring was all Browns as they led 10–0 at halftime. In the third quarter, the Steelers were able to cut that lead to 3 when Jaylen Warren ran for a 74-yard touchdown to make it 10–7. They tied it up at 10–10 when Chris Boswell kicked a 28-yard field goal. However, getting the ball back later on in the quarter, the Steelers' defense was unable to prevent the Browns' comeback when Dustin Hopkins kicked the game-winning 34-yard field goal to make the final score 13–10.

With the loss, the Steelers fell to 6–4 and third place in the AFC North. This would also be the final game for Matt Canada as the Steelers' offensive coordinator before his firing.

==== Week 12: at Cincinnati Bengals ====
Week 12: Pittsburgh Steelers at Cincinnati Bengals – Game summary

Quarter	1	2	3	4	Total
**Steelers**	0	3	7	6	**16**
Bengals	0	7	0	3	**10**

at Paycor Stadium, Cincinnati, Ohio

- Date: November 26
- Game time: 1:00 p.m. EST
- Game weather: Rain, 48 °F (9 °C)
- Game attendance: 65,090
- Referee: Brad Rogers
- TV announcers (CBS): Ian Eagle, Charles Davis and Evan Washburn
- Recap, Game Book

Game information

**First quarter**

- No scoring plays.

**Second quarter**

- PIT – Chris Boswell 41-yard field goal, 12:39. Steelers 3–0. **Drive: 8 plays, 66 yards, 3:44.**
- CIN – Drew Sample 11-yard pass from Jake Browning (Evan McPherson kick), 10:30. Bengals 7–3. **Drive: 4 plays, 53 yards, 2:09.**

**Third quarter**

- PIT – Najee Harris 5-yard run (Chris Boswell kick), 1:34. Steelers 10–7. **Drive: 14 plays, 79 yards, 7:50.**

**Fourth quarter**

- PIT – Chris Boswell 34-yard field goal, 8:03. Steelers 13–7. **Drive: 10 plays, 62 yards, 5:07.**
- PIT – Chris Boswell 33-yard field goal, 2:51. Steelers 16–7. **Drive: 7 plays, 52 yards, 3:07.**
- CIN – Evan McPherson 47-yard field goal, 2:04. Steelers 16–10. **Drive: 5 plays, 47 yards, 0:47.**

**Top passers**

- PIT – Kenny Pickett – 24/33, 278 yards
- CIN – Jake Browning – 19/26, 227 yards, TD, INT

**Top rushers**

- PIT – Najee Harris – 15 rushes, 99 yards, TD
- CIN – Joe Mixon – 8 rushes, 16 yards

**Top receivers**

- PIT – Pat Freiermuth – 9 receptions, 120 yards
- CIN – Ja'Marr Chase – 4 receptions, 81 yards

After a tough loss on the road, the Steelers headed southwest to Cincinnati for Round 1 against the Bengals. After a scoreless first quarter, the Steelers managed to take the lead in the second with Chris Boswell's 41-yard field goal to make it 3–0. The Bengals made it 7–3 at halftime when Jake Browning found Drew Sample on an 11-yard touchdown pass. The Steelers went back to work in the second half, scoring 3 straight times into the fourth quarter as they made it 16–7. The Bengals wrapped up the scoring of the game late in the quarter as Evan McPherson kicked a 47-yard field goal to make the final score 16–10.

With the win, the Steelers improved to 7–4.

==== Week 13: vs. Arizona Cardinals ====
Week 13: Arizona Cardinals at Pittsburgh Steelers – Game summary

Quarter	1	2	3	4	Total
**Cardinals**	3	7	7	7	**24**
Steelers	3	0	0	7	**10**

at Acrisure Stadium, Pittsburgh, Pennsylvania

- Date: December 3
- Game time: 1:00 p.m. EST
- Game weather: Mostly cloudy, 56 °F (13 °C)
- Game attendance: 66,436
- Referee: Land Clark
- TV announcers (CBS): Kevin Harlan, Trent Green and Melanie Collins
- Recap, Game Book

Game information

**First quarter**

- PIT – Chris Boswell 29-yard field goal, 12:01. Steelers 3–0. **Drive: 7 plays, 65 yards, 2:59.**
- ARI – Matt Prater 51-yard field goal, 5:44. Tied 3–3. **Drive: 7 plays, 32 yards, 3:32.**

**Second quarter**

- ARI – Trey McBride 5-yard pass from Kyler Murray (Matt Prater kick), 0:15. Cardinals 10–3. **Drive: 15 plays, 99 yards, 4:36.**

**Third quarter**

- ARI – James Conner 1-yard run (Matt Prater kick), 7:18. Cardinals 17–3. **Drive: 7 plays, 21 yards, 3:11.**

**Fourth quarter**

- ARI – James Conner 9-yard run (Matt Prater kick), 8:28. Cardinals 24–3. **Drive: 4 plays, 33 yards, 2:08.**
- PIT – Diontae Johnson 2-yard pass from Mitchell Trubisky (Chris Boswell kick), 4:25. Cardinals 24–10. **Drive: 10 plays, 75 yards, 4:03.**

**Top passers**

- ARI – Kyler Murray – 13/23, 145 yards, TD
- PIT – Mitchell Trubisky – 11/17, 117 yards, TD

**Top rushers**

- ARI – James Conner – 25 rushes, 105 yards, 2 TD
- PIT – Najee Harris – 16 rushes, 63 yards

**Top receivers**

- ARI – Terry McBride – 8 receptions, 89 yards, TD
- PIT – George Pickens – 4 receptions, 86 yards

After a tough road win, the Steelers returned home to take on the Cardinals. After the Steelers grabbed an early 3–0 lead by way of Chris Boswell's 29-yard field goal, the Cardinals scored 24 unanswered points well into the fourth quarter. The Steelers however were able to make the final score 24–10 when Mitchell Trubisky found Diontae Johnson on a 2-yard touchdown pass. The game featured 2 delays due to thunderstorms in the area.

With the upset loss, the Steelers fell to 7–5 and recorded their first home loss to the Cardinals since 1969 season, when the team was known as the St. Louis Cardinals.

==== Week 14: vs. New England Patriots ====
Week 14: New England Patriots at Pittsburgh Steelers – Game summary

Quarter	1	2	3	4	Total
**Patriots**	7	14	0	0	**21**
Steelers	3	7	0	8	**18**

at Acrisure Stadium, Pittsburgh, Pennsylvania

- Date: December 7
- Game time: 8:15 p.m. EST
- Game weather: Partly cloudy, 42 °F (6 °C)
- Game attendance: 66,376
- Referee: Clay Martin
- TV announcers (WPXI/Prime Video): Al Michaels, Kirk Herbstreit and Kaylee Hartung
- Recap, Game Book

Game information

**First quarter**

- NE – Ezekiel Elliott 11-yard pass from Bailey Zappe (Chad Ryland kick), 11:12. Patriots 7–0. **Drive: 8 plays, 75 yards, 3:48.**
- PIT – Chris Boswell 56-yard field goal, 6:39. Patriots 7–3. **Drive: 7 plays, 31 yards, 4:33.**

**Second quarter**

- NE – Hunter Henry 7-yard pass from Bailey Zappe (Chad Ryland kick), 14:14. Patriots 14–3. **Drive: 2 plays, 11 yards, 0:33.**
- NE – Hunter Henry 24-yard pass from Bailey Zappe (Chad Ryland kick), 7:38. Patriots 21–3. **Drive: 4 plays, 59 yards, 2:10.**
- PIT – Diontae Johnson 25-yard pass from Mitchell Trubisky (Chris Boswell kick), 2:50. Patriots 21–10. **Drive: 8 plays, 75 yards, 4:48.**

**Third quarter**

- No scoring plays.

**Fourth quarter**

- PIT – Mitchell Trubisky 1-yard run (Mitchell Trubisky–Pat Freiermuth pass), 11:44. Patriots 21–18. **Drive: 4 plays, 26 yards, 1:39.**

**Top passers**

- NE – Bailey Zappe – 19/28, 240 yards, 3 TD, INT
- PIT – Mitchell Trubisky – 22/35, 190 yards, TD, INT

**Top rushers**

- NE – Ezekiel Elliott – 22 rushes, 68 yards
- PIT – Mitchell Trubisky – 8 rushes, 30 yards, TD

**Top receivers**

- NE – Ezekiel Elliott – 7 receptions, 72 yards, TD
- PIT – George Pickens – 5 receptions, 19 yards

After a tough home loss, the Steelers stayed home for a Thursday Night duel against the Patriots. The Pats scored first when Bailey Zappe found Ezekiel Elliott on an 11-yard pass to make it 7–0. The Steelers made it 7–3 by way of Chris Boswell's 56-yard field goal later on in the first quarter. In the second quarter, the Patriots would score their remaining points of the entire game, making the lead 21–3 when Zappe connected with Hunter Henry on 2 touchdown passes from 8 and 24 yards. The Steelers managed to shorten the deficit at halftime when Mitchell Trubisky found Diontae Johnson on a 25-yard pass to make it 21–10. After a scoreless third quarter, the Steelers came within 3 in the fourth when Trubisky ran for 1-yard touchdown (with a successful 2-point conversion) to make it 21–18. However, the Steelers would fail to score again.

With the upset loss, the Steelers fell to 7–6. They also became the first team in NFL history to be above .500, play 2 consecutive games against teams 8 games below .500, and lose both of them.

==== Week 15: at Indianapolis Colts ====
Week 15: Pittsburgh Steelers at Indianapolis Colts – Game summary

Quarter	1	2	3	4	Total
Steelers	6	7	0	0	**13**
**Colts**	0	14	10	6	**30**

at Lucas Oil Stadium, Indianapolis, Indiana

- Date: December 16
- Game time: 4:30 p.m. EST
- Game weather: None (retractable roof closed)
- Game attendance: 64,171
- Referee: Adrian Hill
- TV announcers (KDKA/NFLN): Rich Eisen, Kurt Warner and Jamie Erdahl
- Recap, Game Book

After a couple of home losses, the Steelers traveled to take on the Colts. The Steelers would put up a promising 13–0 lead well into the second quarter. However, the Colts were able to score 30 consecutive points throughout the rest of the first and throughout all the second half, handing the Steelers a 30–13 loss.

With their third straight upset loss, the Steelers fell to 7–7. Combined with the Bengals' win over the Vikings earlier in the day, the Steelers dropped to last place in the AFC North. This became the Steelers' first loss against the Colts since 2008 and first loss against them on the road since 2005. Following the loss, the Steelers playoff chances dropped to 9%.

==== Week 16: vs. Cincinnati Bengals ====
Week 16: Cincinnati Bengals at Pittsburgh Steelers – Game summary

Quarter	1	2	3	4	Total
Bengals	0	0	11	0	**11**
**Steelers**	7	17	7	3	**34**

at Acrisure Stadium, Pittsburgh, Pennsylvania

- Date: December 23
- Game time: 4:30 p.m. EST
- Game weather: Cloudy, 49 °F (9 °C)
- Game attendance: 66,646
- Referee: Craig Wrolstad
- TV announcers (NBC): Noah Eagle, Todd Blackledge, and Kathryn Tappen
- Recap, Game Book

Game information

**First quarter**

- PIT – George Pickens 86-yard pass from Mason Rudolph (Chris Boswell kick), 10:45. Steelers 7–0. **Drive: 2 plays, 92 yards, 0:52.**

**Second quarter**

- PIT – Calvin Austin 7-yard run (Chris Boswell kick), 14:21. Steelers 14–0. **Drive: 10 plays, 80 yards, 5:40.**
- PIT – Najee Harris 3-yard run (Chris Boswell kick), 7:06. Steelers 21–0. **Drive: 4 plays, 14 yards, 1:35.**
- PIT – Chris Boswell 50-yard field goal, 0:00. Steelers 24–0. **Drive: 12 plays, 64 yards, 2:14.**

**Third quarter**

- CIN – Tee Higgins 80-yard pass from Jake Browning (Evan McPherson-Joe Mixon pass), 11:11. Steelers 24–8. **Drive: 1 plays, 80 yards, 0:11.**
- PIT – George Pickens 66-yard pass from Mason Rudolph (Chris Boswell kick), 9:38. Steelers 31–8. **Drive: 3 plays, 75 yards, 1:33.**
- CIN – Evan McPherson 35-yard field goal, 0:00. Steelers 31–11. **Drive: 12 plays, 51 yards, 5:08.**

**Fourth quarter**

- PIT – Chris Boswell 30-yard field goal, 6:57. Steelers 34–11. **Drive: 9 plays, 31 yards, 5:29.**

**Top passers**

- CIN – Jake Browning – 28/42, 335 yards, TD, 3 INT
- PIT – Mason Rudolph – 17/27, 290 yards, 2 TD

**Top rushers**

- CIN – Joe Mixon – 11 rushes, 43 yards
- PIT – Najee Harris – 19 rushes, 78 yards, TD

**Top receivers**

- CIN – Tee Higgins – 5 receptions, 140 yards, TD
- PIT – George Pickens – 4 receptions, 195 yards, 2 TD

After yet another tough loss, the Steelers returned home for game 2 against the Bengals. At halftime, the Steelers were able to build a 24–0 lead. In the third quarter, the Bengals finally scored when Jake Browning found Tee Higgins on an 80-yard touchdown pass (with a successful 2-point conversion) to make it 24–8. The Steelers however pulled away as Mason Rudolph connected with George Pickens on a 66-yard touchdown pass to make it 31–8. The Bengals ended the third quarter when Evan McPherson kicked a 35-yard field goal to make it 31–11. In the fourth quarter, the Steelers scored the only points as Chris Boswell kicked a 30-yard field goal to make the final score 34–11.

With their 3-game losing streak snapped, the Steelers improved to 8–7. They also swept the Bengals for the first time since 2019.

==== Week 17: at Seattle Seahawks ====
Week 17: Pittsburgh Steelers at Seattle Seahawks – Game summary

Quarter	1	2	3	4	Total
**Steelers**	7	10	7	6	**30**
Seahawks	0	14	3	6	**23**

at Lumen Field, Seattle, Washington

- Date: December 31
- Game time: 4:05 p.m. EST/1:05 p.m. PST
- Game weather: Partly cloudy, 47 °F (8 °C)
- Game attendance: 68,735
- Referee: Shawn Hochuli
- TV announcers (Fox): Kenny Albert, Jonathan Vilma and Shannon Spake
- Recap, Game Book

Game information

**First quarter**

- PIT – Jaylen Warren 18-yard run (Chris Boswell kick), 1:47. Steelers 7–0. **Drive: 14 plays, 80 yards, 7:57.**

**Second quarter**

- SEA – Kenneth Walker III 13-yard run (Jason Myers kick), 13:50. Tied 7–7. **Drive: 7 plays, 75 yards, 2:57.**
- PIT – Chris Boswell 39-yard field goal, 10:27. Steelers 10–7. **Drive: 6 plays, 54 yards, 3:23.**
- SEA – Jaxon Smith-Njigba 12-yard pass from Geno Smith (Jason Myers kick), 5:30. Seahawks 14–10. **Drive: 8 plays, 75 yards, 4:57.**
- PIT – Najee Harris 9-yard run (Chris Boswell kick), 1:36. Steelers 17–14. **Drive: 9 plays, 75 yards, 3:54.**

**Third quarter**

- SEA – Jason Myers 43-yard field goal, 10:47. Tied 17–17. **Drive: 9 plays, 41 yards, 4:13.**
- PIT – Najee Harris 4-yard run (Chris Boswell kick), 6:57. Steelers 24–17. **Drive: 6 plays, 71 yards, 3:50.**

**Fourth quarter**

- SEA – Jason Myers 42-yard field goal, 13:30. Steelers 24–20. **Drive: 7 plays, 62 yards, 2:40.**
- PIT – Chris Boswell 26-yard field goal, 7:07. Steelers 27–20. **Drive: 13 plays, 65 yards, 6:23.**
- PIT – Chris Boswell 21-yard field goal, 4:31. Steelers 30–20. **Drive: 6 plays, 13 yards, 2:29.**
- SEA – Jason Myers 24-yard field goal, 2:01. Steelers 30–23. **Drive: 11 plays, 69 yards, 2:30.**

**Top passers**

- PIT – Mason Rudolph – 18/24, 274 yards
- SEA – Geno Smith – 23/33, 290 yards, TD

**Top rushers**

- PIT – Najee Harris – 27 rushes, 122 yards, 2 TD
- SEA – Kenneth Walker III – 10 rushes, 53 yards, TD

**Top receivers**

- PIT – George Pickens – 7 receptions, 131 yards
- SEA – DK Metcalf – 5 receptions, 106 yards

After a huge win at home, the Steelers traveled west to take on the Seahawks. In the first quarter, the Steelers scored the only points, making it 7–0 by way of an 18-yard touchdown run by Jaylen Warren. In the second quarter, the Seahawks tied it up at 7–7 by way of Kenneth Walker III running for a 13-yard touchdown. The Steelers then moved ahead by 3 after Chris Boswell kicked a 39-yard field goal to make it 10–7. The Seahawks however moved into the lead when Geno Smith found Jaxon Smith-Njigba on a 12-yard touchdown pass to make it 14–10. A 9-yard touchdown run by Najee Harris gave the Steelers a 17–14 lead at halftime. In the third quarter, the Seahawks tied the game up at 17–17 when Jason Myers kicked a 43-yard field goal. The Steelers retook the lead when Harris ran for a 4-yard touchdown to make it 24–17. In the fourth quarter, the Seahawks came closer when Myers kicked a 42-yard field goal to make it 24–20. Boswell would make it 30–20 when he kicked 2 field goals from 26 and 21 yards out. Later on, Myers shortened the deficit to 7 with a 24-yard field goal to make it 30–23. The Steelers were then able to run down the Seahawks' defense and seal the victory.

With the win, the Steelers improved to 9–7. They also defeated the Seahawks on the road for the first time since 1983. With the Bengals' loss to the Chiefs, they assured a third-place finish in the AFC North.

==== Week 18: at Baltimore Ravens ====
Week 18: Pittsburgh Steelers at Baltimore Ravens – Game summary

Quarter	1	2	3	4	Total
**Steelers**	7	0	0	10	**17**
Ravens	0	7	0	3	**10**

at M&T Bank Stadium, Baltimore, Maryland

- Date: January 6
- Game time: 4:30 p.m. EST
- Game weather: Rain, 38 °F (3 °C)
- Game attendance: 70,355
- Referee: Brad Allen
- TV announcers (ESPN/ABC/ESPN+): Chris Fowler, Louis Riddick, Dan Orlovsky and Laura Rutledge
- Recap, Game Book

Game information

**First quarter**

- PIT – Najee Harris 6-yard run (Chris Boswell kick), 2:36. Steelers 7–0. **Drive: 12 plays, 76 yards, 7:32.**

**Second quarter**

- BAL – Isaiah Likely 27-yard pass from Tyler Huntley (Justin Tucker kick), 2:19. Tied 7–7. **Drive: 6 plays, 71 yards, 2:48.**

**Third quarter**

- No scoring plays.

**Fourth quarter**

- PIT – Diontae Johnson 71-yard pass from Mason Rudolph (Chris Boswell kick), 14:49. Steelers 14–7. **Drive: 6 plays, 89 yards, 3:01.**
- PIT – Chris Boswell 25-yard field goal, 3:13. Steelers 17–7. **Drive: 9 plays, 25 yards, 4:01.**
- BAL – Justin Tucker 36-yard field goal, 0:16. Steelers 17–10. **Drive: 12 plays, 57 yards, 2:57.**

**Top passers**

- PIT – Mason Rudolph – 18/20, 152 yards, TD
- BAL – Tyler Huntley – 15/28, 146 yards, TD

**Top rushers**

- PIT – Najee Harris – 26 rushes, 112 yards, TD
- BAL – Gus Edwards – 10 rushes, 48 yards

**Top receivers**

- PIT – Diontae Johnson – 4 receptions, 89 yards, TD
- BAL – Nelson Agholor – 5 receptions, 39 yards

After a tough road win, the Steelers then traveled to Baltimore for Round 2 against the Ravens. In a game that meant possibly getting into the postseason for them, the Steelers would score in the first quarter to make it 7–0 by way of a Najee Harris 6-yard touchdown run. The Ravens tied it up in the second quarter for a 7–7 halftime lead when Tyler Huntley found Isaiah Likely on a 27-yard touchdown pass. After a scoreless third quarter, the Steelers made it 17–7 when Mason Rudolph found Diontae Johnson on a 71-yard touchdown pass, followed by Chris Boswell kicking a 25-yard field goal. The Ravens then made it 17–10 when Justin Tucker kicked a 36-yard field goal with 16 seconds left in the game. The Ravens failed to recover an onside kick, sealing the victory for the Steelers.

With this win, the Steelers ended the regular season with a 10–7 record and swept the Ravens for the third time in four years. With the Titans' win over the Jaguars the following day, the Steelers qualified for the postseason.

=== Standings ===
==== Division ====
AFC North
	W	L	T	PCT	DIV	CONF	PF	PA	STK
^{(1)} Baltimore Ravens	13	4	0	.765	3–3	8–4	483	280	L1
^{(5)} Cleveland Browns	11	6	0	.647	3–3	8–4	396	362	L1
^{(7)} Pittsburgh Steelers	10	7	0	.588	5–1	7–5	304	324	W3
Cincinnati Bengals	9	8	0	.529	1–5	4–8	366	384	W1

==== Conference ====
AFC
#	Team	Division	W	L	T	PCT	DIV	CONF	SOS	SOV	STK
**Division leaders**
1	Baltimore Ravens	North	13	4	0	.765	3–3	8–4	.543	.529	L1
2 (Note: Buffalo claimed the No. 2 seed over Kansas City based on head-to-head victory.) (Note: Buffalo finished ahead of Miami in the AFC East based on head-to-head sweep.)	Buffalo Bills	East	11	6	0	.647	4–2	7–5	.471	.471	W5
3	Kansas City Chiefs	West	11	6	0	.647	4–2	9–3	.481	.428	W2
4	Houston Texans	South	10	7	0	.588	4–2	7–5	.474	.465	W2
**Wild cards**
5 (Note: Cleveland claimed the No. 5 seed over Miami based on conference record.)	Cleveland Browns	North	11	6	0	.647	3–3	8–4	.536	.513	L1
6	Miami Dolphins	East	11	6	0	.647	4–2	7–5	.450	.358	L2
7	Pittsburgh Steelers	North	10	7	0	.588	5–1	7–5	.540	.571	W3
**Did not qualify for the postseason**
8 (Note: Cincinnati finished ahead of Jacksonville based on head-to-head victory. Division tie break was initially used to eliminate Indianapolis (see below).)	Cincinnati Bengals	North	9	8	0	.529	1–5	4–8	.574	.536	W1
9 (Note: Jacksonville finished ahead of Indianapolis based on head-to-head sweep.)	Jacksonville Jaguars	South	9	8	0	.529	4–2	6–6	.533	.477	L1
10	Indianapolis Colts	South	9	8	0	.529	3–3	7–5	.491	.444	L1
11 (Note: Las Vegas finished ahead of Denver based on head-to-head sweep.)	Las Vegas Raiders	West	8	9	0	.471	4–2	6–6	.488	.426	W1
12	Denver Broncos	West	8	9	0	.471	3–3	5–7	.488	.485	L1
13	New York Jets	East	7	10	0	.412	2–4	4–8	.502	.454	W1
14	Tennessee Titans	South	6	11	0	.353	1–5	4–8	.522	.422	W1
15	Los Angeles Chargers	West	5	12	0	.294	1–5	3–9	.529	.388	L5
16	New England Patriots	East	4	13	0	.235	2–4	4–8	.522	.529	L2
**Tiebreakers** (Note: When breaking ties for three or more teams under the NFL's rules, they are first broken within divisions, then comparing only the highest ranked remaining team from each division.)

== Postseason ==
The Steelers would make the NFL Playoffs with a record of 10–7 as the 7th seed. The team would be scheduled to face off against the 2nd Seed Buffalo Bills at Highmark Stadium on January 14, 2024. The game would be postponed to the following day due to high amounts of snow collection in the stadium. The Steelers would lose to the Bills within regulation by the score of 31–17.

=== Schedule ===
Round	Date	Opponent (seed)	Result	Record	Venue	Recap
Wild Card	January 15	at Buffalo Bills (2)	L 17–31	0–1	Highmark Stadium	Recap

=== Game summaries ===
==== AFC Wild Card Playoffs: at (2) Buffalo Bills ====
AFC Wild Card Playoffs: (7) Pittsburgh Steelers at (2) Buffalo Bills – Game summary

Quarter	1	2	3	4	Total
Steelers	0	7	3	7	17
Bills	14	7	3	7	31

at Highmark Stadium, Orchard Park, New York

- Date: January 15, 2024
- Game time: 4:30 p.m. EST
- Game weather: Partly cloudy, 17 °F (−8 °C)
- Game attendance: 70,040
- Referee: Carl Cheffers
- TV announcers (CBS): Jim Nantz, Tony Romo, Tracy Wolfson and Jay Feely
- Recap, Game Book

Game information

First quarter

- BUF – Dawson Knox 9-yard pass from Josh Allen (Tyler Bass kick), 7:02. Bills 7–0. Drive: 10 plays, 80 yards, 5:33.
- BUF – Dalton Kincaid 29-yard pass from Josh Allen (Tyler Bass kick), 4:10. Bills 14–0. Drive: 1 play, 29 yards, 0:05.

Second quarter

- BUF – Josh Allen 52-yard run (Tyler Bass kick), 7:01. Bills 21–0. Drive: 8 plays, 80 yards, 3:51.
- PIT – Diontae Johnson 10-yard pass from Mason Rudolph (Chris Boswell kick), 1:39. Bills 21–7. Drive: 5 plays, 33 yards, 0:35.

Third quarter

- PIT – Chris Boswell 40-yard field goal, 8:50. Bills 21–10. Drive: 9 plays, 38 yards, 4:34.
- BUF – Tyler Bass 45-yard field goal, 1:32. Bills 24–10. Drive: 14 plays, 48 yards, 7:18.

Fourth quarter

- PIT – Calvin Austin 7-yard pass from Mason Rudolph (Chris Boswell kick), 10:32. Bills 24–17. Drive: 12 plays, 75 yards, 6:00.
- BUF – Khalil Shakir 17-yard pass from Josh Allen (Tyler Bass kick), 6:27. Bills 31–17. Drive: 7 plays, 70 yards, 4:05.

Top passers

- PIT – Mason Rudolph – 22/39, 229 yards, 2 TD, INT
- BUF – Josh Allen – 21/30, 203 yards, 3 TD

Top rushers

- PIT – Jaylen Warren – 8 rushes, 38 yards
- BUF – James Cook – 18 rushes, 79 yards

Top receivers

- PIT – Pat Freiermuth – 5 receptions, 76 yards
- BUF – Dalton Kincaid – 3 receptions, 59 yards, TD

The 7-seeded Steelers traveled to Orchard Park to take on the 2-seeded Bills. Through the first 2 quarters, the Bills made it 21–0 before the Steelers made it 21–7 at halftime when Mason Rudolph found Diontae Johnson on a 10-yard touchdown pass. The Steelers went back to work in the third quarter when Chris Boswell kicked a 40-yard field goal to make it 21–10. Later on, the Bills made it a 2-touchdown game when Tyler Bass kicked a 45-yard field goal to make it 24–10. The Steelers came within a touchdown when Mason Rudolph found Calvin Austin III on a 7-yard touchdown pass to make it 24–17. But the Bills sealed the game later on when Josh Allen found Khalil Shakir on a 17-yard touchdown pass to make the final score 31–17.

With the loss, the Steelers would go on to lose their fifth straight postseason game and finished the season with a total record of 10–8.
