= Joey Porter Jr. =

American football player (born 2000)

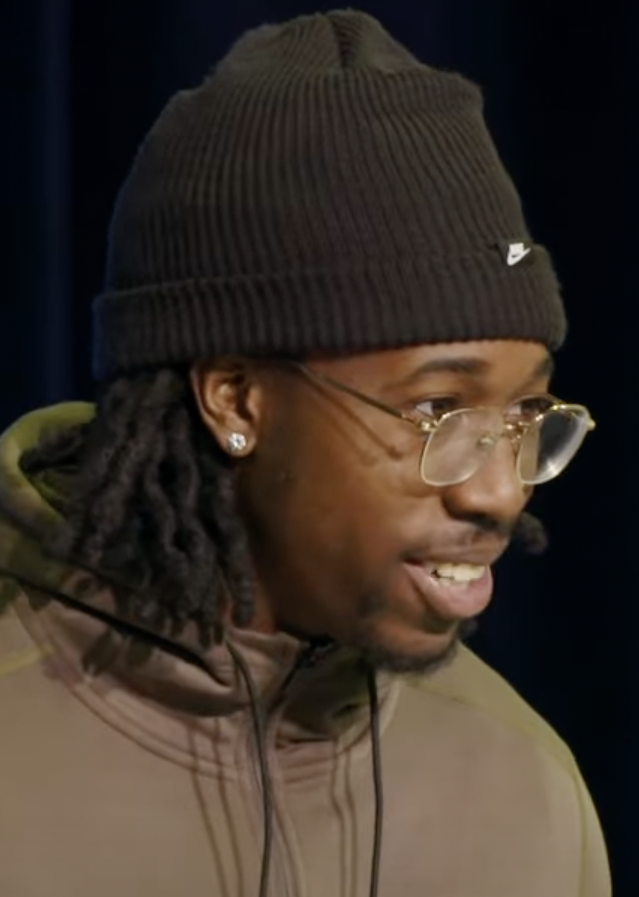
- Porter at the 2023 NFL Combine

No. 25 – Dallas Cowboys
- Position: Cornerback
- Roster status: Active

Personal information
- Born: July 26, 2000 (age 26); Bakersfield, California, U.S.
- Listed height: 6 ft 2 in (1.88 m)
- Listed weight: 193 lb (88 kg)

Career information
- High school: North Allegheny (Wexford, Pennsylvania)
- College: Penn State (2019–2022)
- NFL draft: 2023: 2nd round, 32nd overall pick

Career history
- Pittsburgh Steelers (2023–2026); Dallas Cowboys (2026–present)

Awards and highlights
- PFWA All-Rookie Team (2023); First-team All-Big Ten (2022); 2× Third-team All-Big Ten (2020, 2021)

Career NFL statistics as of Week 10, 2026
- Total tackles: 173
- Pass deflections: 35
- Interceptions: 3
- Sacks: 1.0
- Stats at Pro Football Reference

Joseph Eugene Porter Jr. (born July 26, 2000) is an American professional football cornerback for the Dallas Cowboys of the National Football League (NFL). He played college football for the Penn State Nittany Lions and was selected by the Pittsburgh Steelers in the second round of the 2023 NFL draft. He is the son of the former NFL linebacker Joey Porter, who the Steelers selected in the 1999 NFL draft.

== Early life ==
Porter Jr. attended North Catholic High School in Cranberry Township, Butler County, Pennsylvania, before transferring to North Allegheny Senior High School in Wexford, Pennsylvania. He played cornerback and wide receiver in high school. He committed to Pennsylvania State University to play college football.

== College career ==
In his first year at Penn State in 2019, Porter Jr. played in four games and had three tackles. In 2020, he started all eight games recording 33 tackles and one sack. In 2021, he started all 13 games and had 50 tackles and one interception.

=== College statistics ===
Year	Team	Tackles					Interceptions					Fumbles		
Year	Team	Solo	Ast	Cmb	TfL	Sck	Int	Yds	Avg	TD	PD	FR	FF	TD
2019	Penn State	2	1	1	0	0	0	0	0	0	1	0	0	0
2020	Penn State	24	9	33	2	1	0	0	0	0	4	0	0	0
2021	Penn State	39	11	50	0	0	1	1	1	0	4	0	0	0
2022	Penn State	21	6	27	0	0	0	0	0	0	11	1	0	0
Career		86	27	113	2	1	1	1	1	0	20	1	0	0

== Professional career ==
=== Pre-draft ===
NFL draft analyst Dane Brugler of the Athletic listed him as the second best cornerback available in the draft. Pro Football Focus ranked Porter Jr. as the fourth best cornerback prospect (21st overall) on their big board. NFL media analysts Bucky Brooks and Daniel Jeremiah had Porter Jr. ranked as the third best cornerback in the draft. ESPN analyst Mel Kiper Jr. ranked Porter fifth among all cornerback prospects in the draft. NFL draft analysts had him projected to be a first or early second round pick in the 2023 NFL Draft.

External videos
- Joey Porter Jr. College Highlights
- Joey Porter Jr. runs 4.46s 40-yard dash

Pre-draft measurables
Height	Weight	Arm length	Hand span	Wingspan	40-yard dash	10-yard split	20-yard split	Vertical jump	Broad jump	Bench press
6 ft 2 1/2 in (1.89 m)	193 lb (88 kg)	34 in (0.86 m)	10 in (0.25 m)	6 ft 8 7/8 in (2.05 m)	4.46 s	1.50 s	2.57 s	37.5 in (0.95 m)	10 ft 11 in (3.33 m)	17 reps
All values from NFL Combine/Pro Day

=== Pittsburgh Steelers ===
==== 2023 ====
The Pittsburgh Steelers selected Porter Jr. in the second round (32nd overall) of the 2023 NFL draft. They obtained the 2023 second-round pick they used to draft Porter during a mid-season trade with the Chicago Bears in 2022, in exchange for the Steelers sending wide receiver Chase Claypool to the Bears. He was the fifth cornerback drafted in 2023.

External videos
- Steelers select Joey Porter Jr. No. 32
- 2023 Draft Prospects: Joey Porter Jr.

On July 26, 2023, the Pittsburgh Steelers signed Porter to a four–year, $9.61 million contract that includes $8.99 million guaranteed and a signing bonus of $3.99 million.

Throughout training camp, he competed against Levi Wallace to be the No. 2 starting cornerback following the departure of Ahkello Witherspoon. Head coach Mike Tomlin named him a backup and listed him as the third cornerback on the depth chart to begin the season, behind starting cornerbacks Patrick Peterson and Levi Wallace.

On September 10, 2023, Porter made his professional regular season debut in the Pittsburgh Steelers' home-opener against the San Francisco 49ers, but was limited to one solo tackle in their 7–30 loss. On October 8, 2023, Porter made two tackles, one pass deflection, and had his first career interception that was vital to the Steelers' 17–10 victory against the Baltimore Ravens. With the Steelers down 10–8 with 4:10 left in the fourth quarter, Porter intercepted a pass by Lamar Jackson to wide receiver Odell Beckham. The turnover, led to a 14–yard touchdown pass to George Pickens and a comeback victory. In Week 8, Porter earned his first career start in place of Levi Wallace who was inactive due to a foot injury. He recorded five combined tackles (four solo)bas the Steelers lost 10–20 to the Jacksonville Jaguars. Although Wallace returned from injury the following week, defensive coordinator Teryl Austin chose to remain with Porter as the No. 2 starting cornerback for the rest of the season. In Week 11, he set a season-high with six combined tackles (five solo) and made one pass deflection during a 10–13 loss at the Cleveland Browns. He finished the season 4 a total of 43 combined tackles (32 solo), ten pass deflections, and one interception in 17 games and 11 starts. He was named to the PFWA All-Rookie Team. As a rookie, his performances were marred by several penalties as he was penalized 12 times in total throughout the season, tying him sixth in the NFL for the most penalties on a single player for the 2023 season. These penalties resulted in a total of 75 yards being given to opposing teams in the form of penalty yards. He received an overall grade of 63.4 from Pro Football Focus as a rookie in 2023.

==== 2024 ====
He entered training camp slated as a starting cornerback following the retirement of Patrick Peterson. Head coach Mike Tomlin named him a starting cornerback to begin the season and paired him with Donte Jackson.

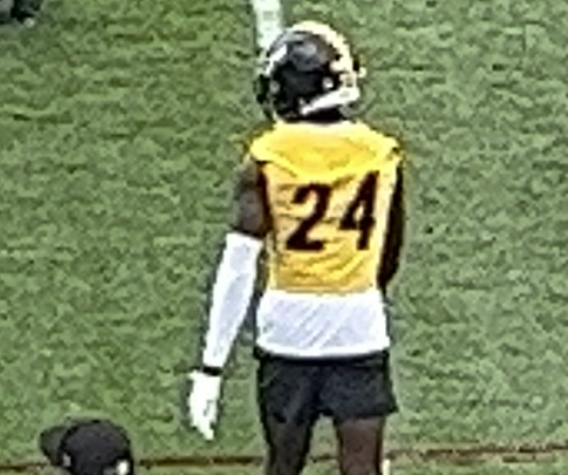
Porter during Steelers training camp in 2024

Through the first three weeks of the 2024 season, Porter only allowed four receptions for 40 yards on six targets, with PFF ranking him third in PFF grading for the Steelers defense. On October 6, 2024, Porter made four combined tackles (three solo), one pass deflection, and had his lone interception of the season on a pass by Dak Prescott to wide receiver CeeDee Lamb during a 17–20 loss against the Dallas Cowboys. In Week 8, he set a season-high with nine combined tackles (five solo) as the Steelers defeated the New York Giants 26–18. In Week 11, he recorded one tackle and set a season-high with two pass deflections during an 18–16 win against the Baltimore Ravens. In Week 16, Porter recorded three solo tackles before exiting during the third quarter of a 17–34 loss at the Baltimore Ravens due to a knee injury. He was subsequently inactive the following week as the Steelers lost 10–29 against the Kansas City Chiefs. He finished the season with 86 targets against 54 completions for a completion percentage of 62.8. He also accounted for 70 combined tackles (53 solo), seven pass deflections, and one interception in 16 games and 16 starts. He received an overall grade of 55.0 from Pro Football Focus, which ranked 161st among 222 qualifying cornerbacks in 2024.

In his second consecutive postseason start, Porter recorded six tackles, only missing one in the entire game and was targeted five times as the Steelers ended their season with a 28-14 loss to the Ravens.

==== 2025 ====
During Week 1 of the 2025 season, Porter recorded a solo tackle, before leaving the game with hamstring tightness. He was inactive for week 2.

==== 2026 ====
During the off-season and Steelers training camp, Porter sat out team drills amid a contract dispute over an extension. He also reported back pain at the start of training camp and was placed on the Physically unable to perform (PUP) list on July 28, 2026. He was activate off the PuP list on August 30, but was noncommittal to playing without a contract extension. Porter was inactive for the first three games of the 2026 regular season, with his continued back pain being listed as the reason.

=== Dallas Cowboys ===
On September 30, 2026, the Steelers traded Porter to the Dallas Cowboys in exchange for a 2028 second-round pick and a conditional 2027 sixth-round pick.

== NFL career statistics ==
Legend
**Bold**	Career high

=== Regular season ===
Year	Team	Games		Tackles					Interceptions						Fumbles				
Year	Team	GP	GS	Cmb	Solo	Ast	Sck	TFL	Int	Yds	Avg	Lng	TD	PD	FF	Fum	FR	Yds	TD
2023	PIT	17	11	43	32	11	0.0	1	**1**	0	0.0	0	0	10	0	0	0	0	0
2024	PIT	16	16	**70**	**53**	**17**	0.0	**2**	**1**	**16**	**16.0**	**16**	0	7	0	0	0	0	0
2025	PIT	14	14	52	35	**17**	**1.0**	0	**1**	0	0.0	0	0	**14**	0	0	0	0	0
2026	DAL	5	5	8	6	2	0.0	1	0	0	0.0	0	0	4	0	0	0	0	0
Career		52	46	173	126	47	1.0	4	3	16	5.3	16	0	35	0	0	0	0	0

=== Postseason ===
Year	Team	Games		Tackles					Interceptions						Fumbles				
Year	Team	GP	GS	Cmb	Solo	Ast	Sck	TFL	Int	Yds	Avg	Lng	TD	PD	FF	Fum	FR	Yds	TD
2023	PIT	1	1	2	2	0	0.0	0	0	0	0.0	0	0	0	0	0	0	0	0
2024	PIT	1	1	**6**	**6**	0	0.0	0	0	0	0.0	0	0	1	0	0	0	0	0
2025	PIT	1	1	2	2	0	0.0	0	0	0	0.0	0	0	**2**	0	0	0	0	0
Career		3	3	10	10	0	0.0	0	0	0	0.0	0	0	3	0	0	0	0	0

== Personal life ==
Porter is the son of Joey Porter, a former NFL linebacker for the Steelers, Miami Dolphins, and Arizona Cardinals.
