= Rodney Williams (tight end) =

American football player (born 1998)

Profile
- Position: Tight end

Personal information
- Born: April 8, 1998 (age 28); Memphis, Tennessee, U.S.
- Listed height: 6 ft 4 in (1.93 m)
- Listed weight: 235 lb (107 kg)

Career information
- High school: Germantown (TN)
- College: UT Martin (2016–2021)
- NFL draft: 2022: undrafted

Career history
- Denver Broncos (2022)*; Pittsburgh Steelers (2022–2024)
- * Offseason or practice squad member only

Career NFL statistics as of Week 2, 2024
- Total tackles: 6
- Stats at Pro Football Reference

Rodney Williams II (born April 8, 1998) is an American professional football tight end. He played college football for the UT Martin Skyhawks and was signed by the Denver Broncos as an undrafted free agent in 2022.

== Early life ==
Williams was born on April 28, 1998, in Memphis, Tennessee. He attended Germantown High School and was a standout athlete in football, basketball and track. He was an all-metro and all-district selection in football and won both the regional and state championship in high jumping. He committed to play college football for the UT Martin Skyhawks.

== College career ==
Williams began his collegiate career as a wide receiver. He appeared in eight games as a true freshman at UT Martin in 2016, recording four receptions for 78 yards. He appeared in 10 games with four catches for 32 yards in 2017 before totaling 23 receptions for 252 yards in 2018 while seeing his first action as a starter. He redshirted due to an injury in 2019 after having appeared in four games with nine catches for 111 yards. Williams switched to tight end in the 2020–21 season and was selected second-team FCS All-American after recording 30 catches for 327 yards and four touchdowns. He was a second-team all-conference selection in his final year, the fall 2021 season, in which he tallied 29 receptions for 417 yards and three touchdowns. He finished ninth in UT Martin history for receptions with 99, also having posted 1,217 receiving yards and seven touchdowns.

== Professional career ==
Pre-draft measurables
| Height | Weight | Arm length | Hand span | 40-yard dash | 10-yard split | 20-yard split | 20-yard shuttle | Three-cone drill | Vertical jump | Broad jump | Bench press |
|---|---|---|---|---|---|---|---|---|---|---|---|
| 6 ft 3 1/4 in (1.91 m) | 235 lb (107 kg) | 33 7/8 in (0.86 m) | 9 in (0.23 m) | 4.55 s | 1.52 s | 2.52 s | 4.16 s | 7.44 s | 40.5 in (1.03 m) | 10 ft 10 in (3.30 m) | 21 reps |
All values from Pro Day

=== Denver Broncos ===
After going unselected in the 2022 NFL draft, Williams was signed by the Denver Broncos as an undrafted free agent. He was waived on August 16, 2022.

=== Pittsburgh Steelers ===
On September 13, 2022, Williams was signed to the practice squad of the Pittsburgh Steelers. He signed a reserve/future contract on January 10, 2023. He was waived on August 29, 2023, and re-signed to the practice squad the next day. He was promoted to the active roster on October 4, after an injury to Pat Freiermuth. During week 5 against the Baltimore Ravens, Williams nearly recovered a punt blocked by teammate Miles Killebrew as it rolled out of the endzone for a safety to help the Steelers win 17–10.

Williams was waived by the Steelers on August 27, 2024, and re-signed to the practice squad. He was promoted to the active roster on September 18. He was waived on November 5.
