= 2027 NFL draft =

2027 American football draft

General information
- Date: April 29 – May 1, 2027
- Location: National Mall (Washington, D.C.)
- Networks: ESPN, ABC, NFL Network, ESPN Deportes, ESPN Radio

Overview
- 256 total selections in 7 rounds
- League: National Football League

The 2027 NFL draft will be the 92nd annual meeting of National Football League (NFL) franchises to select newly eligible players. The event is scheduled to be held on the National Mall in Washington, D.C. from April 29 to May 1, 2027.

== Host city ==
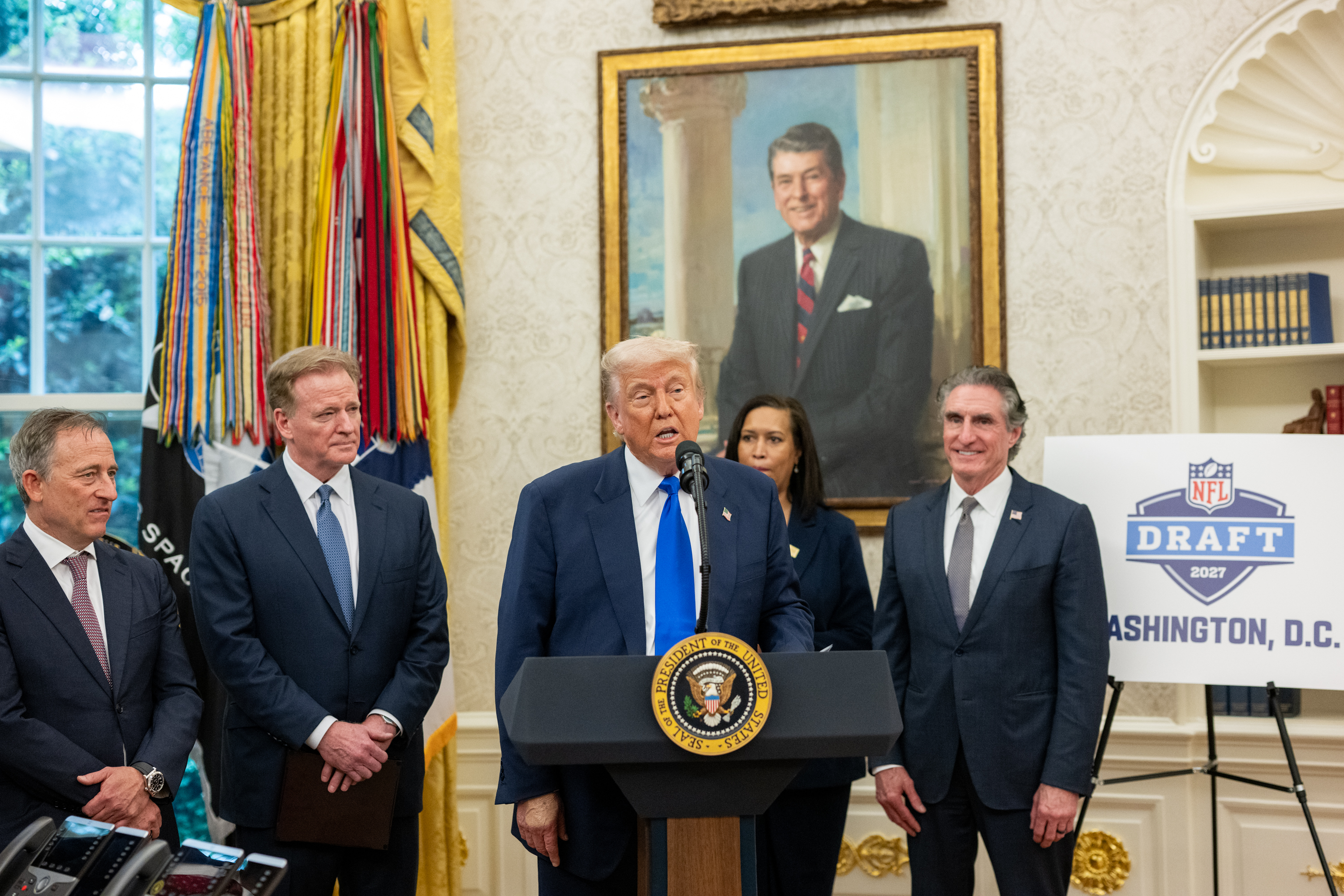
U.S. president Donald Trump announcing Washington, D.C. as the host city of the draft

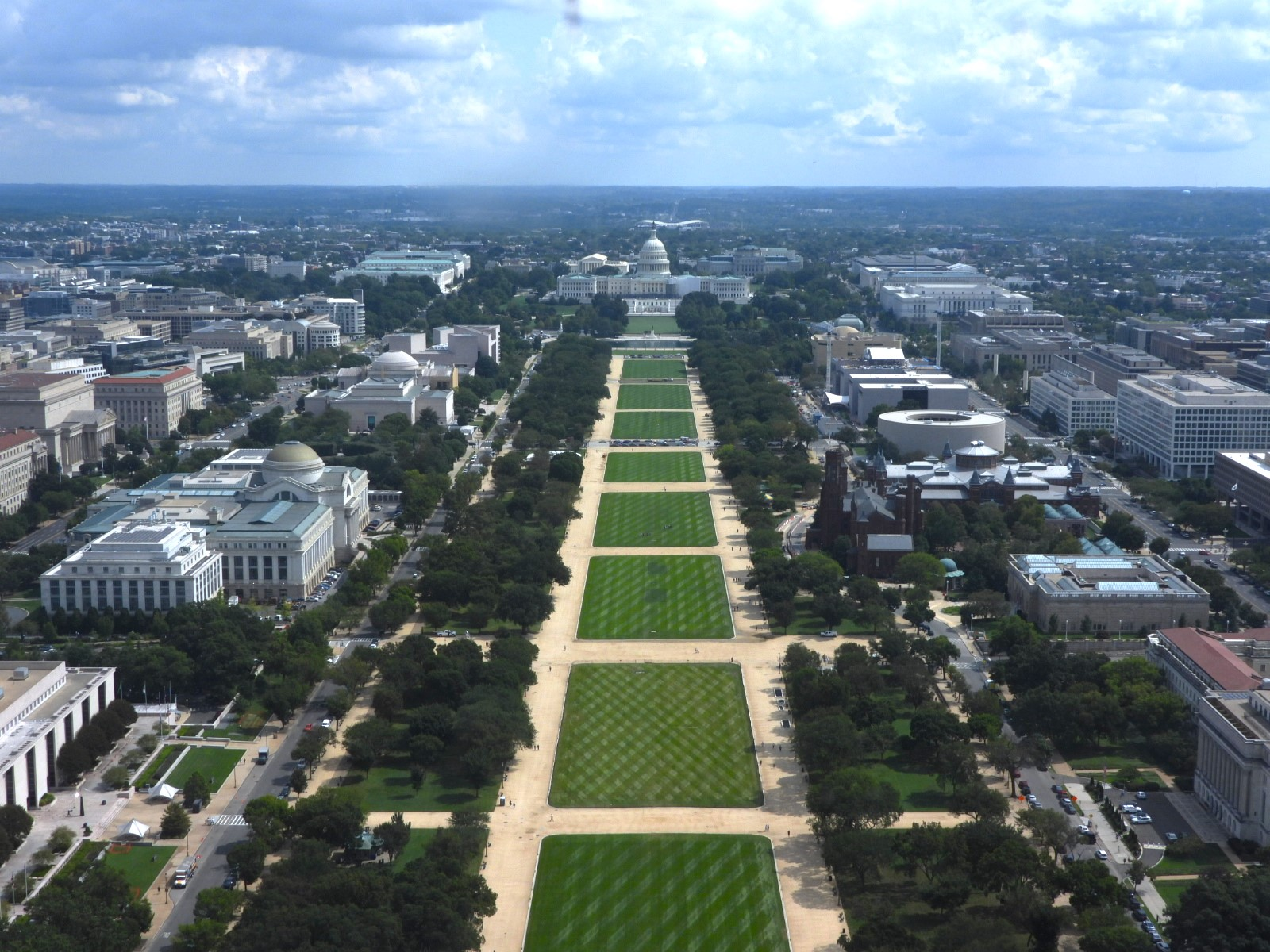
The draft is scheduled to be held on the National Mall

On May 5, 2025, U.S. president Donald Trump, NFL commissioner Roger Goodell, and Washington Commanders owner Josh Harris held a press event in the Oval Office announcing Washington, D.C., as the host city for the NFL draft. The event is scheduled to be held on the National Mall facing the United States Capitol from April 29 to May 1, 2027, with over a million attendees anticipated. The draft will be the first held in D.C. since 1941.

== Trades involving draft picks ==
In the explanations below (PD) indicates trades completed prior to the start of the draft (i.e. Pre–Draft), while (D) denotes trades that take place during the 2027 draft.

=== Round 1 ===
- Green Bay → Dallas (PD). Green Bay traded a first-round selection, a 2026 first-round selection and DT Kenny Clark to Dallas in exchange for DE Micah Parsons.
- Indianapolis → NY Jets (PD). Indianapolis traded a first-round selection, a 2026 first-round selection and WR Adonai Mitchell to the NY Jets in exchange for CB Sauce Gardner.
- Dallas → NY Jets (PD). Dallas traded a first-round selection, a 2026 second-round selection and DT Mazi Smith to the NY Jets in exchange for DT Quinnen Williams. New York will receive whichever is earlier of Dallas' original selection or the selection they acquired from Green Bay.
- LA Rams → Cleveland (PD). LA Rams traded a first-round selection, a 2028 second-round selection, a 2029 third-round selection, and OLB Jared Verse to Cleveland in exchange for DE Myles Garrett.
- Chicago → Tennessee (PD). Chicago traded a first-, fourth-round selection, and a 2028 first-round selection to Tennessee in exchange for a 2028 fifth-round selection and DT Jeffery Simmons.
- Jacksonville → Philadelphia (PD). Jacksonville traded a first-round selection and a 2029 second-round selection to Philadelphia in exchange for DT Jordan Davis.

=== Round 2 ===
- Houston → Arizona (PD). Houston traded a second-round selection and a seventh-round selection to Arizona in exchange for a sixth-round selections and WR Marvin Harrison Jr.
- Jacksonville → Atlanta (PD). Jacksonville traded a second-round selection and a 2028 fifth-round selection to Atlanta in exchange for S Jessie Bates.
- Buffalo → Tennessee (PD). Buffalo traded a second-round selection to Tennessee in exchange for a fifth-round selection and S Amani Hooker.

=== Round 3 ===
- LA Rams → Kansas City (PD). LA Rams traded a third-round selection, and 2026 first-, fifth- and sixth-round selections to Kansas City in exchange for CB Trent McDuffie.
- Philadelphia → Minnesota (PD). Philadelphia traded a third-round selection and a 2026 third-round selection to Minnesota in exchange for a 2026 seventh-round selection and OLB Jonathan Greenard.
- Dallas → Pittsburgh (PD). Dallas traded third- and sixth-round selections to Pittsburgh in exchange for a fourth-round selection and T Broderick Jones.
- Seattle → Indianapolis (PD). Seattle traded a third-round selection and a 2028 fifth-round selection to Indianapolis in exchange for G Quenton Nelson.
- Minnesota → Las Vegas (PD). Minnesota traded a third-round selection to Las Vegas in exchange for QB Kirk Cousins.

=== Round 4 ===
- Minnesota → Carolina (PD). Minnesota traded a fourth-round selection and a 2026 fifth-round selection to Carolina in exchange for a fifth-round selection, a conditional 2026 seventh-round selection and WR Adam Thielen.
- Dallas → Green Bay (PD) Dallas traded a fourth-round selection to Green Bay in exchange for DE Rashan Gary.
- NY Giants → Cleveland (PD). The NY Giants traded a fourth-round selection and 2026 fourth- and fifth- round selections to Cleveland in exchange for a 2026 third-round selection.
- Seattle → Cleveland (PD). Seattle traded a fourth-round selection to Cleveland in exchange for a 2026 fifth-round selection.
- Pittsburgh → Dallas (PD). See Round 3: Dallas → Pittsburgh.
- San Francisco → Indianapolis (PD). San Francisco traded a fourth-round selection to Indianapolis in exchange for DT DeForest Buckner.
- Chicago → Tennessee (PD). See Round 1: Chicago → Tennessee.
- Baltimore → Arizona (PD). Baltimore traded a fourth-round selection and a 2028 seventh-round selection to Arizona in exchange for a fifth-round selection and QB Jacoby Brissett.
- Kansas City → Indianapolis (PD). Kansas City traded a fourth-round selection and a fifth-round selection to Indianapolis in exchange for a seventh-round selection and WR Josh Downs.

=== Round 5 ===
- Houston → Cleveland (PD). Houston traded a fifth-round selection and a 2025 fifth-round selection to Cleveland in exchange for two 2025 sixth-round selections and a 2025 seventh-round selection.
- Dallas → Pittsburgh (PD). Dallas traded a fifth-round selection and a 2026 third-round selection to Pittsburgh in exchange for a sixth-round selection and WR George Pickens.
- Pittsburgh → Miami (PD). Pittsburgh traded a fifth-round selection and S Minkah Fitzpatrick to Miami in exchange for a seventh-round selection, CB Jalen Ramsey and TE Jonnu Smith.
- Carolina → Minnesota (PD). See Round 4: Minnesota → Carolina.
- Chicago → New England (PD). Chicago traded a fifth-round selection to New England in exchange for C Garrett Bradbury.
- New England → Philadelphia (PD). New England traded a fifth-round selection and a 2028 first-round selection to Philadelphia in exchange for WR A. J. Brown.
- NY Giants → Minnesota (PD). The NY Giants traded a fifth-round selection to Minnesota in exchange for QB J. J. McCarthy.
- Baltimore → Philadelphia (PD). Baltimore traded a fifth-round selection and a 2028 second-round selection to Philadelphia in exchange for a seventh-round selection and C Cam Jurgens.
- Arizona → Baltimore (PD). See Round 4: Baltimore → Arizona.
- Atlanta → Chicago (PD). Atlanta traded a fifth-round selection and CB Clark Phillips III to Chicago in exchange for DT Gervon Dexter.
- Tennessee → Buffalo (PD). See Round 2: Buffalo → Tennessee.
- Kansas City → Indianapolis (PD). See Round 4: Kansas City → Indianapolis.

=== Round 6 ===
- Pittsburgh → Dallas (PD). See Round 5: Dallas → Pittsburgh.
- San Francisco → Kansas City (PD). San Francisco traded a sixth-round selection to Kansas City in exchange for a seventh-round selection and WR Skyy Moore.
- NY Jets → Minnesota (PD). The NY Jets traded a sixth-round selection and a 2026 sixth-round selection to Minnesota in exchange for a seventh-round selection and DT Harrison Phillips.
- Green Bay → Philadelphia (PD). Green Bay traded a sixth-round selection to Philadelphia in exchange for T Darian Kinnard.
- New Orleans → New England (PD). New Orleans traded a sixth-round selection to New England in exchange for a 2028 seventh-round selection and WR Ja'Lynn Polk.
- Cleveland → Houston (PD). Cleveland traded a sixth-round selection to Houston in exchange for a seventh-round selection and T Cam Robinson.
- Philadelphia → NY Jets (PD). Philadelphia traded a sixth-round selection and WR John Metchie III to the NY Jets in exchange for a seventh-round selection and CB Michael Carter II.
- LA Chargers → New Orleans (PD). The LA Chargers traded a sixth-round selection to New Orleans in exchange for OT Trevor Penning.
- Kansas City → NY Jets (PD). Kansas City traded a sixth-round selection to the NY Jets in exchange for QB Justin Fields.
- Philadelphia → Green Bay (PD). Philadelphia traded a sixth-round selection and a 2026 fifth-round selection to Green Bay in exchange for WR Dontayvion Wicks.
- Baltimore → San Francisco → Indianapolis. Multiple trades:

Baltimore → San Francisco (PD). Baltimore traded a sixth-round selection and a 2026 fifth-round selection to San Francisco in exchange for a 2026 fourth-round selection.
San Francisco → Indianapolis (PD). San Francisco traded a sixth-round selection to Indianapolis in exchange for WR Keenan Allen.

- Minnesota → New England (PD). Minnesota traded a sixth-round selection and a 2026 seventh-round selection to New England in exchange for a 2026 sixth-round selection.
- Atlanta → Kansas City (PD). Atlanta traded a sixth-round selection to Kansas City in exchange for a seventh-round selection and OT Wanya Morris.
- Jacksonville → NY Giants (PD). Jacksonville traded a sixth-round selection to NY Giants in exchange for G Daniel Faalele.
- Dallas → Pittsburgh (PD). See Round 3: Dallas → Pittsburgh.
- Dallas → Pittsburgh (PD). Dallas traded a conditional sixth-round selection and a 2028 second-round selection to Pittsburgh in exchange for CB Joey Porter Jr.
- Arizona → Houston (PD). See Round 2: Houston → Arizona.
- Indianapolis → Buffalo (PD). Indianapolis traded a sixth-round selection to Buffalo in exchange for a seventh-round selection and C Sedrick Van Pran-Granger.
- Houston → New England (PD). Houston traded a sixth-round selection to New England in exchange for a seventh-round selection and LB Marte Mapu.
- New England → Minnesota (PD). New England traded a sixth-round selection to Minnesota in exchange for a seventh-round selection and G Walter Rouse.
- Seattle → LA Chargers (PD). Seattle traded a sixth-round selection to LA Chargers in exchange for CB Avery Smith.

=== Round 7 ===
- LA Rams → Baltimore → LA Chargers. Multiple trades:

LA Rams → Baltimore (PD). The LA Rams traded a seventh-round selection and CB Tre'Davious White to Baltimore in exchange for a 2026 seventh-round selection.
Baltimore → LA Chargers (PD). Baltimore traded a seventh-round selection and OLB Odafe Oweh to the LA Chargers in exchange for a 2026 fifth-round selection and S Alohi Gilman.

- Miami → Pittsburgh (PD). See Round 5: Pittsburgh → Miami.
- New Orleans → Denver (PD). New Orleans traded a seventh-round selection and a 2026 fourth-round selection to Denver in exchange for WR Devaughn Vele.
- Kansas City → San Francisco (PD). See Round 6: San Francisco → Kansas City.
- Minnesota → NY Jets (PD). See Round 6: NY Jets → Minnesota.
- Philadelphia → Minnesota (PD). Philadelphia traded a seventh-round selection and a 2026 fifth-round selection to Minnesota in exchange for a 2026 sixth-round selection and QB Sam Howell.
- LA Chargers → Houston (PD). The LA Chargers traded a conditional seventh-round selection to Houston in exchange for T Austin Deculus.
- Atlanta → Seattle (PD). Atlanta traded a conditional seventh-round selection to Seattle in exchange for T Michael Jerrell.
- NY Giants → Miami (PD). The NY Giants traded a conditional seventh-round selection and TE Darren Waller to Miami in exchange for a 2026 sixth-round selection.
- Houston → Cleveland (PD). See Round 6: Cleveland → Houston.
- NY Jets → Philadelphia (PD). See Round 6: Philadelphia → NY Jets.
- Baltimore → Philadelphia (PD). Baltimore traded a seventh-round selection and CB Jaire Alexander to Philadelphia in exchange for a 2026 sixth-round selection.
- Houston → Detroit (PD). Houston traded a seventh-round selection, a 2026 fourth-round selection and C Juice Scruggs to Detroit in exchange for RB David Montgomery.
- Philadelphia → Carolina (PD). Philadelphia traded a seventh-round selection to Carolina in exchange for QB Andy Dalton.
- Dallas → Philadelphia (PD). Dallas traded a seventh-round selection and a 2026 first-round selection to Philadelphia in exchange for a 2026 first- and two fourth-round selections.
- Las Vegas → Buffalo (PD). Las Vegas traded a seventh-round selection and a 2026 fourth-round selection to Buffalo in exchange for a 2026 fourth-round selection.
- Kansas City → Atlanta (PD). See Round 6: Atlanta → Kansas City.
- San Francisco → Houston → Arizona. Multiple trades:

San Francisco → Houston (PD). San Francisco traded a seventh-round selection to Houston in exchange for G Jarrett Patterson.
Houston → Arizona (PD). See Round 2: Houston → Arizona.

- Philadelphia → Baltimore (PD). See Round 5: Baltimore → Philadelphia.
- Buffalo → Indianapolis → Kansas City. Multiple trades:

Buffalo → Indianapolis (PD). See Round 6: Indianapolis → Buffalo.
Indianapolis → Kansas City (PD). See Round 4: Kansas City → Indianapolis.

- New England → Houston (PD). See Round 6: Houston → New England.
- Philadelphia → Minnesota (PD). Philadelphia traded a seventh-round selection and a 2026 fifth-round selection to Minnesota in exchange for a 2026 sixth-round selection and QB Sam Howell.
- Minnesota → New England (PD). See Round 6: New England → Minnesota.
- Houston → Dallas (PD). Houston traded a seventh-round selection to Dallas in exchange for OT Nate Thomas.

== Resolution JC-2A picks ==
Resolution JC-2A, enacted by the NFL in November 2020, rewards teams for developing minority candidates for head coach and/or general manager positions. The resolution rewards teams whose minority candidates are hired away for one of those positions by awarding draft picks. These draft picks are at the end of the third round, after standard compensatory picks; if multiple teams qualify, they are awarded by draft order in the first round. These picks are in addition to, and have no impact on, the standard 32 compensatory picks.
