= George Pickens =

American football player (born 2001)

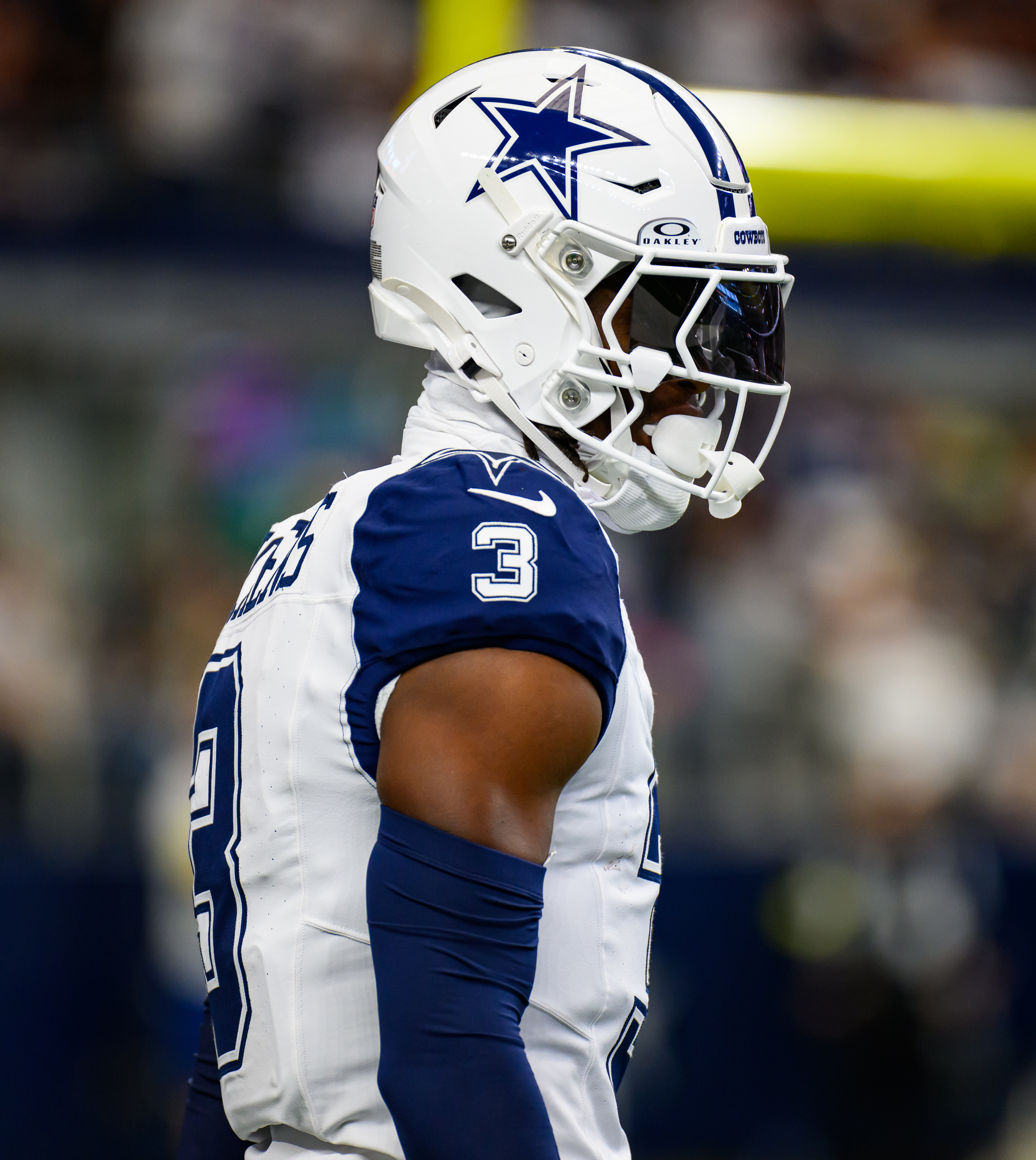
- Pickens with the Dallas Cowboys in 2025

No. 3 – Dallas Cowboys
- Position: Wide receiver
- Roster status: Franchise tag

Personal information
- Born: March 4, 2001 (age 25); Hoover, Alabama, U.S.
- Listed height: 6 ft 3 in (1.91 m)
- Listed weight: 205 lb (93 kg)

Career information
- High school: Hoover
- College: Georgia (2019–2021)
- NFL draft: 2022: 2nd round, 52nd overall pick

Career history
- Pittsburgh Steelers (2022–2024); Dallas Cowboys (2025–present)

Awards and highlights
- Second-team All-Pro (2025); Pro Bowl (2025); CFP national champion (2021)

Career NFL statistics as of Week 5, 2026
- Receptions: 294
- Receiving yards: 4,625
- Receiving touchdowns: 22
- Stats at Pro Football Reference

George Malik Pickens Jr. (born March 4, 2001) is an American professional football wide receiver for the Dallas Cowboys of the National Football League (NFL). He played college football for the Georgia Bulldogs, winning the 2022 College Football Playoff National Championship as a junior. Pickens was selected by the Pittsburgh Steelers in the second round of the 2022 NFL draft.

== Early life ==
George was born in Hoover, Alabama but grew up in nearby Birmingham. He grew up with his older brother, Chris Humes, a former cornerback for the Arkansas State Red Wolves and later the Oakland Raiders of the NFL, who is seven years his senior.

Pickens attended Hoover High School in Hoover, Alabama. As a senior, he had 69 receptions for 1,368 yards and 16 touchdowns. On November 16, 2018, Pickens had five receptions for 202 yards in what was the highest stat line of his tenure at Hoover. He played in the 2019 Under Armour All-American Game. A five star recruit, he originally committed to play college football at Auburn University before flipping his commitment to the University of Georgia. He graduated from Hoover High School in June 2019.

== College career ==
Pickens earned immediate playing time his freshman year at Georgia in 2019, leading the team in receptions (49), receiving yards (727) and receiving touchdowns (8).

In the following season Pickens caught 36 passes for 513 yards and a team-leading six touchdowns in an eight-game season shortened by the COVID-19 pandemic.

In the spring of 2021, Pickens tore his ACL causing him to miss most of his junior season. He returned to play in the final four games of the year, catching just five passes, but made a crucial 52-yard reception during the first quarter in Georgia's win over Alabama in the 2022 College Football Playoff National Championship game. The catch is what put Georgia in Alabama territory for the first time during the game, setting up a short field goal for the Bulldogs. Pickens declared for the 2022 NFL draft following the season.

== Professional career ==
Pre-draft measurables
Height	Weight	Arm length	Hand span	Wingspan	40-yard dash	10-yard split	20-yard split	Vertical jump	Broad jump
6 ft 3 1/4 in (1.91 m)	195 lb (88 kg)	32 3/8 in (0.82 m)	8 3/4 in (0.22 m)	6 ft 5 3/8 in (1.97 m)	4.47 s	1.50 s	2.57 s	34.5 in (0.88 m)	10 ft 5 in (3.18 m)
All values from NFL Combine/Pro Day

=== Pittsburgh Steelers ===
==== 2022 season ====
Pickens was selected by the Pittsburgh Steelers in the second round (52nd overall) of the 2022 NFL draft.

He made his first professional start in the Steelers season opener against the Cincinnati Bengals where he caught one pass on three targets for three yards as the Steelers won 23–20. In Week 3 against the Cleveland Browns, Pickens corralled a one-handed catch while fully extending his body in the air. It was called by some the "Catch of the Year." In Week 4, against the New York Jets, he had six receptions for 102 yards in the 24–20 loss. Pickens scored his first professional touchdown during primetime in Week 7 against the Miami Dolphins when he caught a seven-yard pass from quarterback Kenny Pickett. This was the Steelers' only touchdown in the game, as they lost 16–10. In Week 16, Pickens caught the game-winning touchdown against the Las Vegas Raiders with less than a minute remaining. He finished the 2022 season with 52 receptions for 801 yards and a team-high four receiving touchdowns.

==== 2023 season ====
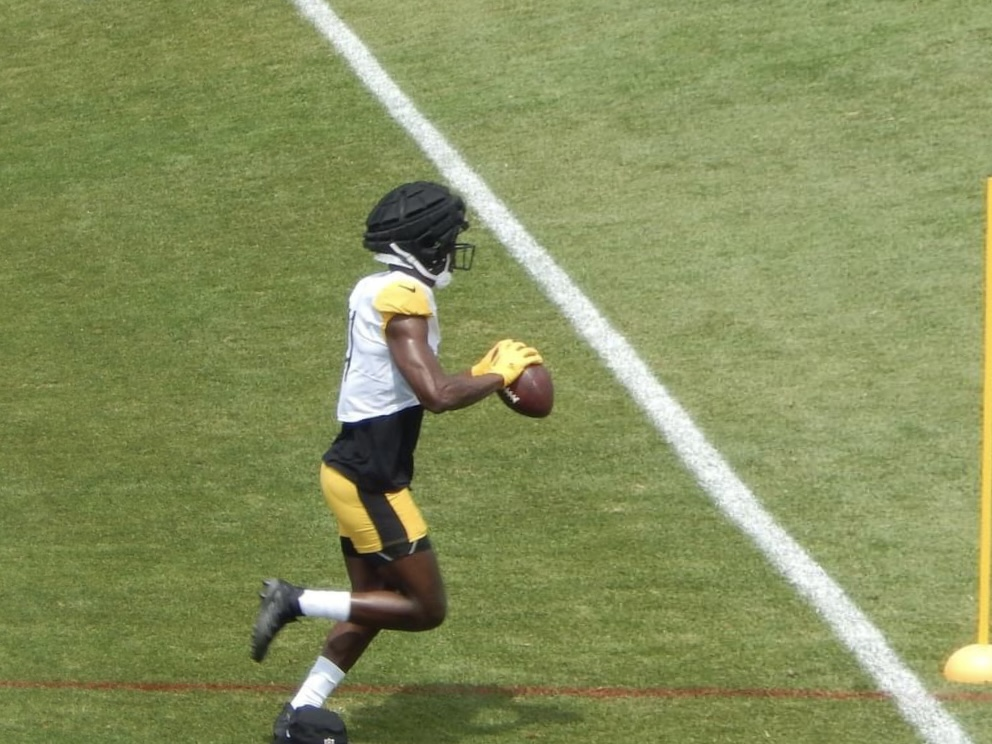
Pickens with the Steelers in 2023

In Week 2 of the 2023 season, Pickens had four receptions for 127 yards and a touchdown in the win over the Browns. In Week 5, against the Ravens, he had six receptions for 130 yards and a touchdown in the 17–10 win. In Week 16 against the Bengals, he had four receptions for 195 yards and two touchdowns, including a 86-yard reception for a score in the first quarter. In the following game, against the Seahawks, he had seven receptions for 131 yards in the win. He finished his second NFL season with 63 receptions for 1,140 yards and five touchdowns in 17 games and 16 starts. He finished the season leading the league in yards per reception with 18.1.

Pickens was on the receiving end of controversy throughout the 2023 season. After the Steelers' 20–16 victory over the Tennessee Titans, Pickens was criticized for lacking effort on the field. Throughout the previous two games, Pickens only completed three of ten receptions for 21 yards. He followed the criticism by posting on his Instagram story the words "free me" and deleted all posts related to the Steelers. Pickens defended his post by making another post on Instagram explaining that the post was not directed at the Steelers, stating it has "[nothing] to do with football."

During Week 15 against the Indianapolis Colts, Pickens was again criticized for a lack of effort, most notably not blocking for running back Jaylen Warren on a potential touchdown drive near the goal line. Following the game, Pickens responded to the criticism stating he was attempting to avoid injury.

==== 2024 season ====
Following the 2024 preseason, Pickens was named wide receiver one on the Steelers' depth chart. In his first start of the season during Week 1, he made six catches on seven targets for 85 yards. During Week 2's 13–6 win over the Denver Broncos, Pickens caught a pass from quarterback Justin Fields to pick up 51 yards and move the ball to the Broncos' six yard line, however it was negated by a holding penalty on right tackle Broderick Jones. He would finish the game with two receptions for 29 yards. Pickens would eclipse his first 100 receiving yard game of the season during the team's Week 4 24–27 loss to the Indianapolis Colts. During the game, he caught seven passes for 113 yards, but failed to score a touchdown. He would also fumble once, causing the Steelers to lose possession of the ball and set up a touchdown drive for the Colts. In the final moments of the Steelers' 17–20 loss to the Dallas Cowboys, Pickens would get his third and final reception of the game. The Steelers needed to gain significant yardage with no timeouts remaining to put themselves in field goal range to tie the score. Pickens caught the ball around the 25 yard line and stood in place momentarily before throwing a backwards pass to Isaac Seumalo leading to multiple lateral passes being thrown before time expired with a failed lateral from Pat Freiermuth to Mason McCormick to end the game. Pickens finished the game with three catches on seven targets for just 26 yards, his worst game statistically of the season through five weeks. Pickens would rebound during the Steelers' 37–15 victory over the New York Jets on October 20. He caught five passes for 111 yards and a touchdown, making him the team's leading receiver for the game.

On November 10 against the Washington Commanders, Pickens caught a 20-yard touchdown pass from Russell Wilson in which he leaped in the air and contorted his body backwards while extending his arms backwards over his head in what was named another "catch of the year" for Pickens in the 28–27 win. During December 1's 44–38 win over the Cincinnati Bengals, Pickens was the team's leading receiver with three catches for 76 yards and a touchdown in the first game the Steelers had put up over 40 points in a single game since November 8, 2018. On December 8, Pickens was ruled out of Week 14's victory over the Cleveland Browns with a hamstring injury he sustained earlier in the week during practice. This was the first game of his career in which he did not play. Pickens returned to the field during the Steelers' 29-10 loss to the Kansas City Chiefs. In the team's season finale against the Bengals, he made one catch on six targets, as well as dropping three passes. His only catch was at the line of scrimmage resulting in him having his only zero yard game of his career thus far as the Steelers were narrowly defeated by the Bengals 19-17. Pickens finished the regular season making 58 receptions for 900 yards and three touchdowns across 13 games.

In the 28–14 Wild Card Round loss to the Baltimore Ravens, he had five catches for 87 yards and a touchdown, in what would be his final game as a Steeler.

=== Dallas Cowboys ===
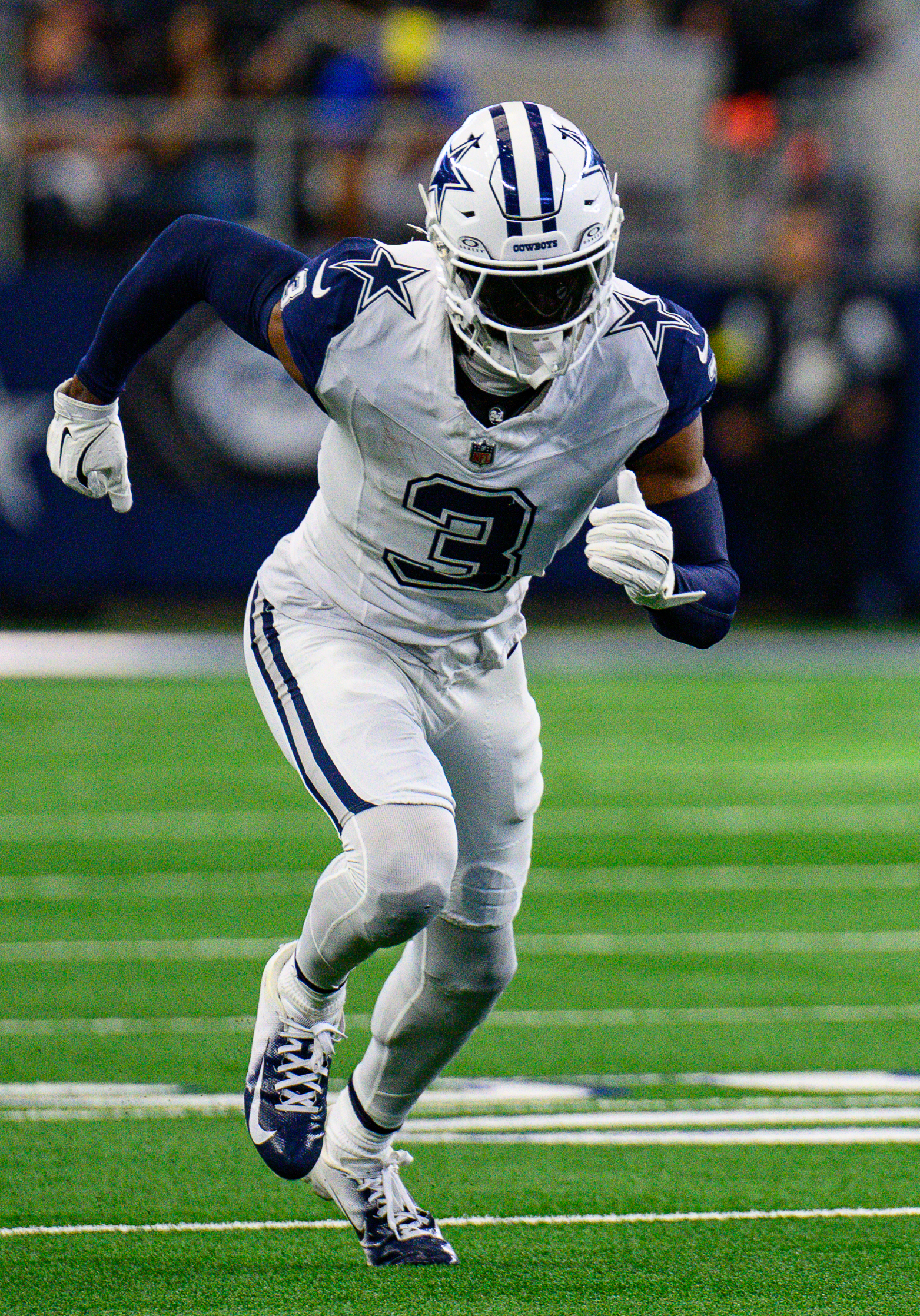
Pickens playing for the Cowboys in 2025

==== 2025 season ====
On May 7, 2025, the Steelers traded Pickens and a 2027 sixth-round pick to the Dallas Cowboys for a 2026 third-round pick (No. 76: Drew Allar) and a 2027 fifth-round pick.

In Week 2 against the New York Giants, Pickens caught nine passes for 68 yards and a touchdown in a 40-37 overtime victory. In Week 4 against the Green Bay Packers, Pickens hauled in eight receptions for 134 yards and two touchdowns in a 40-40 tie. In Week 6 against the Carolina Panthers, he caught nine passes for 168 yards and a touchdown in a 30-27 loss.

In Week 11 against the Las Vegas Raiders, Pickens caught nine passes for 144 yards and one touchdown in a 33-16 victory. In Week 12 against the Philadelphia Eagles, Pickens caught nine passes for 146 yards and one touchdown in a 24-21 comeback victory. In Week 16 against the Los Angeles Chargers, Pickens caught seven passes for 130 yards and a touchdown in a 34-17 loss.

Pickens ended the season with 93 receptions for 1,429 yards and nine touchdowns, all career-highs. He was named to his first career Pro Bowl and earned AP Second-Team All-Pro honors. He would later earn the Offensive MVP for his performance in the Pro Bowl.

==== 2026 season ====
On February 27, 2026, the Cowboys placed the non-exclusive franchise tag on Pickens. He signed the tag on April 29.

In Week 5 against the Tampa Bay Buccaneers on Thursday Night Football, Pickens caught nine passes for 130 yards and a touchdown in a 24-16 loss. In Week 10 against the San Francisco 49ers, Pickens hauled in 11 receptions for 145 yards and three touchdowns in a 46-40 loss, marking the first three touchdown game of his career.

== Career statistics ==
Legend
	Led the league
**Bold**	Career high

=== NFL ===
==== Regular season ====
Year	Team	Games		Receiving					Rushing					Fumbles	
Year	Team	GP	GS	Rec	Yds	Y/R	Lng	TD	Att	Yds	Y/A	Lng	TD	Fum	Lost
2022	PIT	17	12	52	801	15.4	42	4	**3**	**24**	**8.0**	**22**	**1**	0	0
2023	PIT	17	16	63	1,140	**18.1**	**86**	5	**3**	18	6.0	16	0	3	0
2024	PIT	14	12	59	900	15.3	44	3	2	−6	−3.0	4	0	1	**1**
2025	DAL	17	15	**93**	**1,429**	15.4	45	**9**	0	0	0.0	0	0	**4**	0
2026	DAL	5	5	27	355	9.4	19	1	0	0	0.0	0	0	0	0
Career		68	58	283	4,420	15.6	86	21	8	36	4.5	22	1	8	1

==== Postseason ====
Year	Team	Games		Receiving					Rushing					Fumbles	
Year	Team	GP	GS	Rec	Yds	Y/R	Lng	TD	Att	Yds	Y/A	Lng	TD	Fum	Lost
2023	PIT	1	1	**5**	50	10.0	19	0	**1**	**15**	**15.0**	**15**	0	**1**	**1**
2024	PIT	1	1	**5**	**87**	**17.4**	**36**	**1**	0	0	0.0	0	0	0	0
Career		2	2	10	137	13.7	36	1	1	15	15.0	15	0	1	1

=== College ===
Year	Team	GP	Rec	Yards	TDs
2019	Georgia	14	**49**	**727**	**8**
2020	Georgia	8	36	513	6
2021	Georgia	4	5	107	0
Career		26	90	1,347	14

== Personal life ==
After being drafted by the Steelers in 2022, Pickens moved into an apartment in Pittsburgh with his older brother, Chris Humes.

On the second night of the 2022 NFL draft, Pickens was the subject of a viral meme. Dressed in a white T-shirt, blue basketball shorts, and a ski mask, commonly called a "shiesty", Pickens watched as he was selected by the Pittsburgh Steelers in the second round from his family's living room. His outfit, combined with his nonchalant posture, became a meme. Pickens later explained that his look was a mix of humor and frustration after not being chosen in the first round, admitting he was "a little salty". He told CBS Sports he decided to take a more relaxed approach to Day 2, skipping the formal suit he had prepared for the draft's opening night. The ski mask has since continued to be part of Pickens' on- and off-field attire.
