= Alfonzo Graham =

American football player (born 1998)

Profile
- Position: Running back

Personal information
- Born: March 20, 2000 (age 26); Baltimore, Maryland, U.S.
- Listed height: 5 ft 9 in (1.75 m)
- Listed weight: 180 lb (82 kg)

Career information
- High school: Dunbar (Baltimore)
- College: Arizona Western (2018); Fullerton College (2019); Morgan State (2020–2022)
- NFL draft: 2023: undrafted

Career history
- Pittsburgh Steelers (2023)*
- * Offseason or practice squad member only

Awards and highlights
- First Team All-MEAC (2022)

Alfonzo Graham (born March 20, 2000) is an American football running back. He played college football for the Arizona Western Matadors, Fullerton Hornets and Morgan State Bears.

== Early life ==
Warren was born in Baltimore, Maryland, on March 20, 2000. He attended Paul Laurence Dunbar High School in Baltimore.

== College career ==
In 2018, Graham played for Arizona Western College. He ran the ball 13 times for 72 yards.

In 2019, Graham played for Fullerton College in Fullerton, California. As a freshman, he ran the ball 53 times for 278 yards and two touchdowns.

In 2020, Graham transferred to his hometown Morgan State Bears as a priority walk-on. He did not play as a sophomore.

In 2021, Graham got his first opportunity for the Bears, rushing for 506 yards and five touchdowns.

Graham burst onto the scene in 2022. He was one of the MEACs top running backs, running for 1,150 yards and eight touchdowns. He was named First Team All-MEAC.

=== College statistics ===
Year	Team	GP	Rushing					Receiving				
Year	Team	GP	Att	Yds	Avg	Lng	TD	Rec	Yds	Avg	Lng	TD
2018	AZ Western	11	13	72	5.5	27	0	0	0	0	0	0
2019	Fullerton	8	53	278	5.2	55	2	14	175	10.4	44	1
2021	Morgan State	9	54	506	9.4	86	5	17	148	8.7	22	0
2022	Morgan State	11	196	1,150	5.9	55	8	14	85	6.1	27	1
Career		39	326	2,006	6.2	86	15	45	408	8.4	44	2

== Professional career ==
Pre-draft measurables
Height	Weight	Arm length	Hand span	40-yard dash	10-yard split	20-yard split	20-yard shuttle	Three-cone drill	Vertical jump	Broad jump
5 ft 9 in (1.75 m)	185 lb (84 kg)	28 in (0.71 m)	8 1/8 in (0.21 m)	4.56 s	1.58 s	2.63 s	4.22 s	7.29 s	35 in (0.89 m)	9 ft 10 in (3.00 m)
All values from NFL Combine/Pro Day

Graham signed with the Pittsburgh Steelers as an undrafted free agent on May 15, 2023. He tore his labrum in training camp and was placed on injured reserve on August 3, 2023. Graham was waived by the Steelers on April 4, 2024.
