= Pat Freiermuth =

American football player (born 1998)

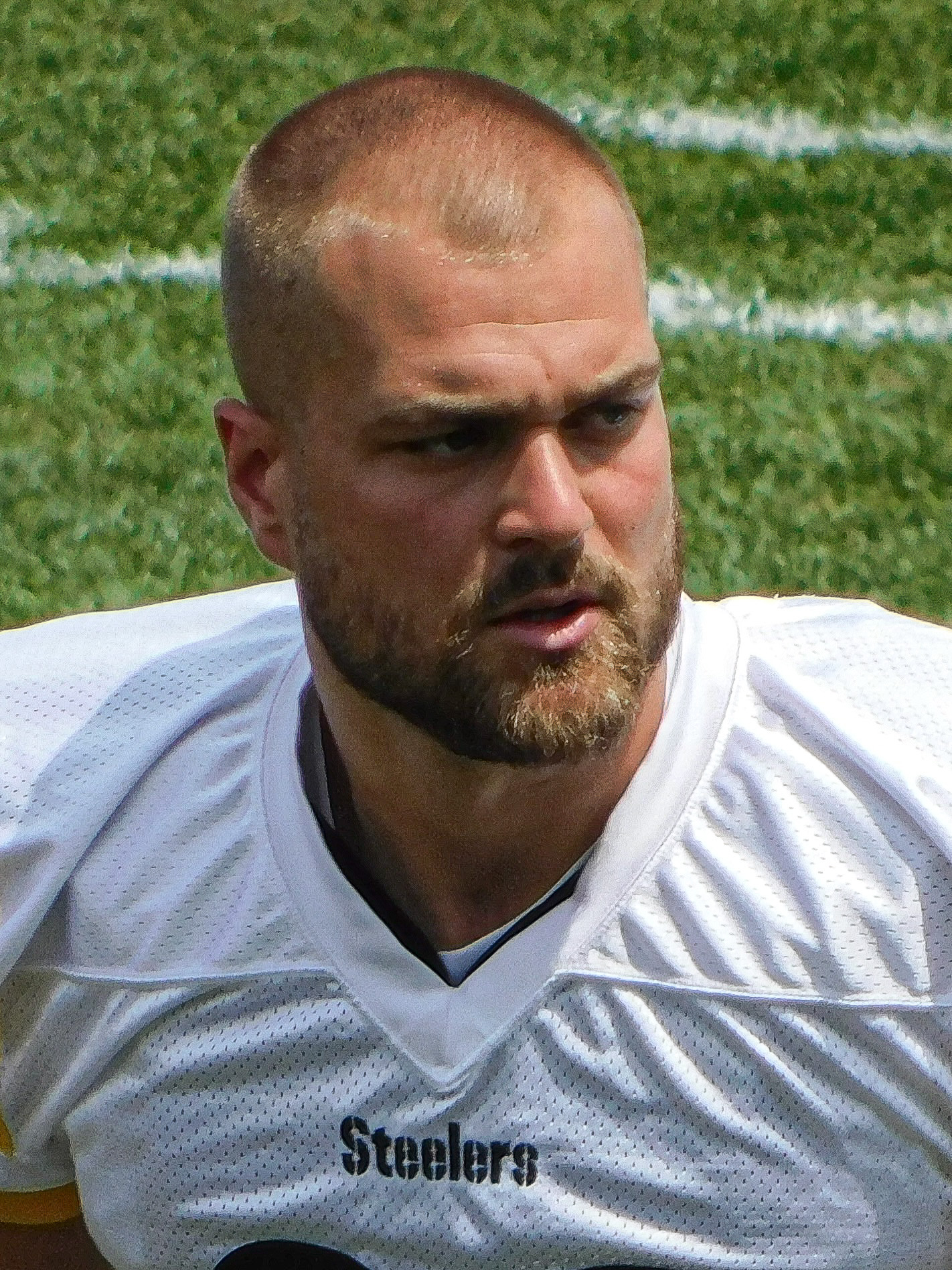
- Freiermuth with the Pittsburgh Steelers in 2025

No. 88 – Pittsburgh Steelers
- Position: Tight end
- Roster status: Active

Personal information
- Born: October 25, 1998 (age 28); Merrimac, Massachusetts, U.S.
- Listed height: 6 ft 5 in (1.96 m)
- Listed weight: 258 lb (117 kg)

Career information
- High school: Brooks School (North Andover, Massachusetts)
- College: Penn State (2018–2020)
- NFL draft: 2021: 2nd round, 55th overall pick

Career history
- Pittsburgh Steelers (2021–present)

Awards and highlights
- Big Ten Tight End of the Year (2020); First-team All-Big Ten (2020); Second-team All-Big Ten (2019)

Career NFL statistics as of Week 10, 2026
- Receptions: 288
- Receiving yards: 2,946
- Receiving touchdowns: 27
- Stats at Pro Football Reference

Patrick John Freiermuth (/ˈfraɪərmuθ/ FRY-ər-mooth; born October 25, 1998) is an American professional football tight end for the Pittsburgh Steelers of the National Football League (NFL). He played college football for the Penn State Nittany Lions and was selected by the Steelers in the second round of the 2021 NFL draft.

== Early life ==
A longtime resident of Merrimac, Massachusetts, Freiermuth attended Pentucket Regional High School in West Newbury, Massachusetts, before transferring to the Brooks School in North Andover, Massachusetts. At Brooks, he played tight end and outside linebacker on the football team, wearing jersey number eight. He also played basketball there as a power forward and a small forward. During his career, he had 1,531 total yards and 24 total touchdowns. A four-star recruit, he committed to Penn State University to play college football.

== College career ==
As a freshman for the Nittany Lions in 2018, Freiermuth made nine starts and recorded 26 receptions for 368 yards and eight touchdowns, breaking the record of most receiving touchdowns by a freshman tight end. He remained the starter for the next two seasons, was voted Penn State Football's Most Valuable Offensive Player in 2019, and was invited to the NFL Scouting Combine a year earlier. Although rumor said he would jump at this, he declined this chance, and in a press conference with Coach James Franklin announced that he had planned to recommit to Penn State for yet another year. He played in a total of 30 games there, and started all but four of them. He scored sixteen career touchdowns, tied for eighth place overall at Penn State for career touchdowns and first place by a tight end. In the end, he had a total of 92 career receptions, 1,185 career receiving yards, and he was named the Big Ten Conference's Kwalick–Clark Tight End of the Year in 2020, making him the first ever Penn State tight end to win this award. He was also voted first-team All-Big Ten by the coaches, and finished the season leading the conference for most receiving yards by a tight end.

== Professional career ==
Pre-draft measurables
Height	Weight	Arm length	Hand span	Wingspan
6 ft 5 in (1.96 m)	251 lb (114 kg)	32 1/2 in (0.83 m)	9 7/8 in (0.25 m)	6 ft 5 3/4 in (1.97 m)
All values from Pro Day

=== 2021 season ===
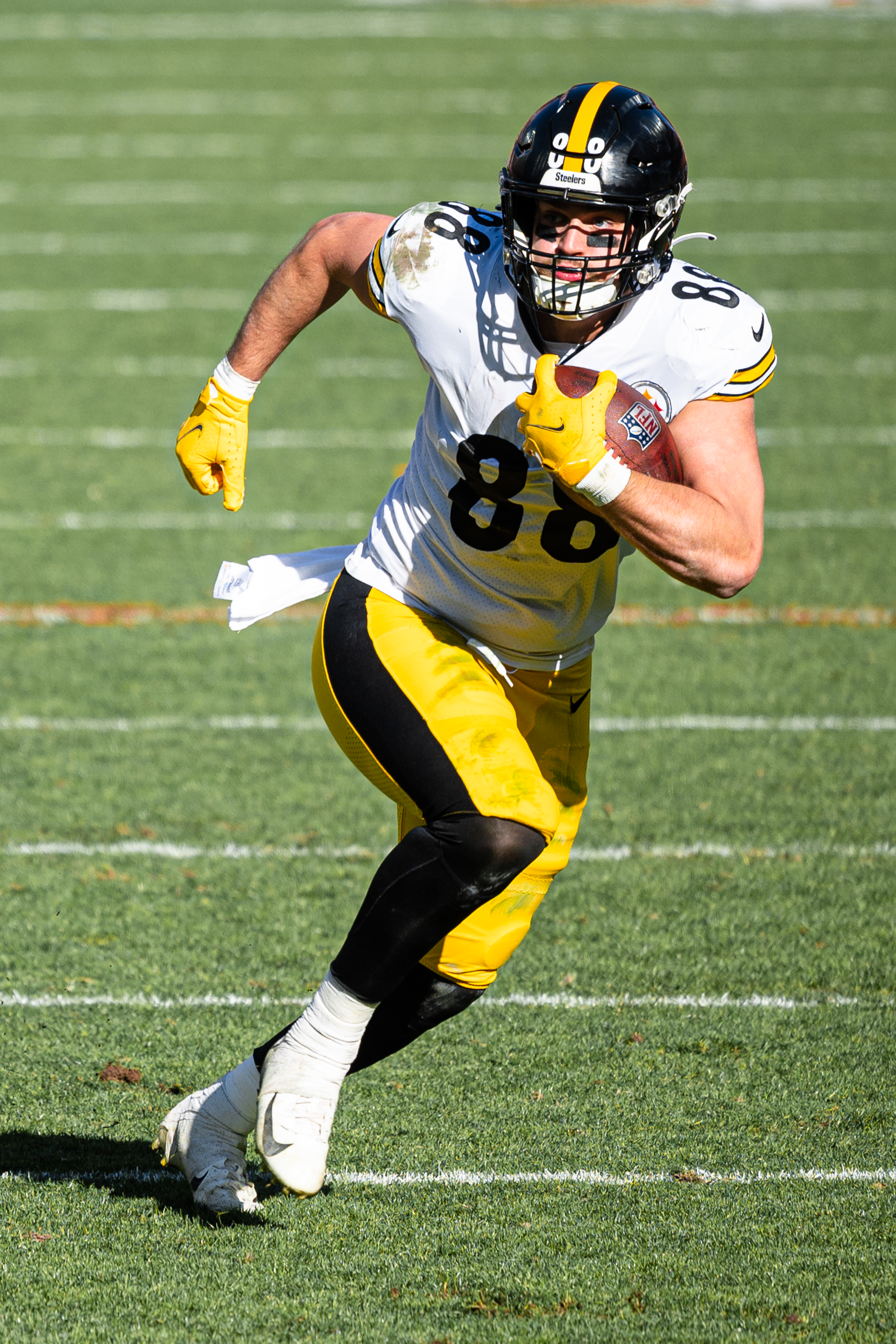
Freiermuth during a game against the Cleveland Browns on October 31, 2021

Freiermuth was selected in the second round (55th overall) of the 2021 NFL draft by the Pittsburgh Steelers to replace tight end Vance McDonald, who retired after the 2020 season. He signed a four-year rookie contract with Pittsburgh on May 25, 2021, and was assigned number 88, most famously worn by Hall of Fame receiver Lynn Swann. Freiermuth started his first NFL game in Week 1 against the Buffalo Bills and recorded his first career reception for 24 yards. He caught his first professional touchdown pass on September 26, 2021, as the Steelers lost to the Cincinnati Bengals when he caught a four yard pass from Ben Roethlisberger. On November 8, Freiermuth had one of his best game of the season, catching five passes on six targets for 43 yards and scoring two touchdowns as the Steelers defeated the Chicago Bears 29–27. The following week against the Detroit Lions, Freiermuth caught five passes for 31 yards in the only tied game of his professional career with a final score of 16–16.

During the season, Freiermuth sustained two concussions. The first happened in Week 12 during a 41–10 loss to the Cincinnati Bengals. The second concussion was sustained in a 19–13 win over the Tennessee Titans in Week 15. He finished the regular season with 60 receptions for 497 yards and seven touchdowns.

On January 16, 2022, Freiermuth played in his first post-season game of his career against the Kansas City Chiefs in the AFC Wild Card Round of the 2021 playoffs. In the game, he caught four passes on five targets for 25 yards.

During his rookie season, similar to former Steelers tight end Heath Miller, home crowds began chanting "Muth", an abbreviation of "Freiermuth", when he would gain yardage or score a touchdown.

=== 2022 season ===
In the 2022 season, Freiermuth played in 16 regular season games, starting eight of them. Freiermuth finished the 2022 season catching 63 passes on 98 targets for 732 yards, the most of his professional career as of August 2024. He scored two touchdowns across all 16 games.

=== 2023 season ===
On October 21, 2023, Freiermuth was placed on injured reserve with a hamstring injury. He was activated on November 18. He would return to the team on November 19 against the Cleveland Browns.

Freiermuth had his statistically best game of the season on November 26 against the Cincinnati Bengals. He caught nine passes on 11 targets for 120 yards, the only game of the season in which he was able to eclipse 100+ receiving yards.

He finished the 2023 regular season making 32 catches on 47 targets for 308 yards and two touchdowns, playing in 12 games and starting nine of them.

In the second post season appearance of his professional career, Freiermuth caught five passes on eight targets for 76 yards in the AFC Wild Card Round against the Buffalo Bills. During the final minutes of the first quarter, Freiermuth caught a pass from quarterback Mason Rudolph before taking off down the sideline. He was tackled by Bills cornerback Christian Benford causing the ball to come loose before being recovered by linebacker Baylon Spector. Replay officials determined the fumble had rolled out of bounds due to the ball making contact with Freiermuth as he exited the field of play, giving possession back to the Steelers. The game ended with the Steelers losing 31–17.

=== 2024 season ===
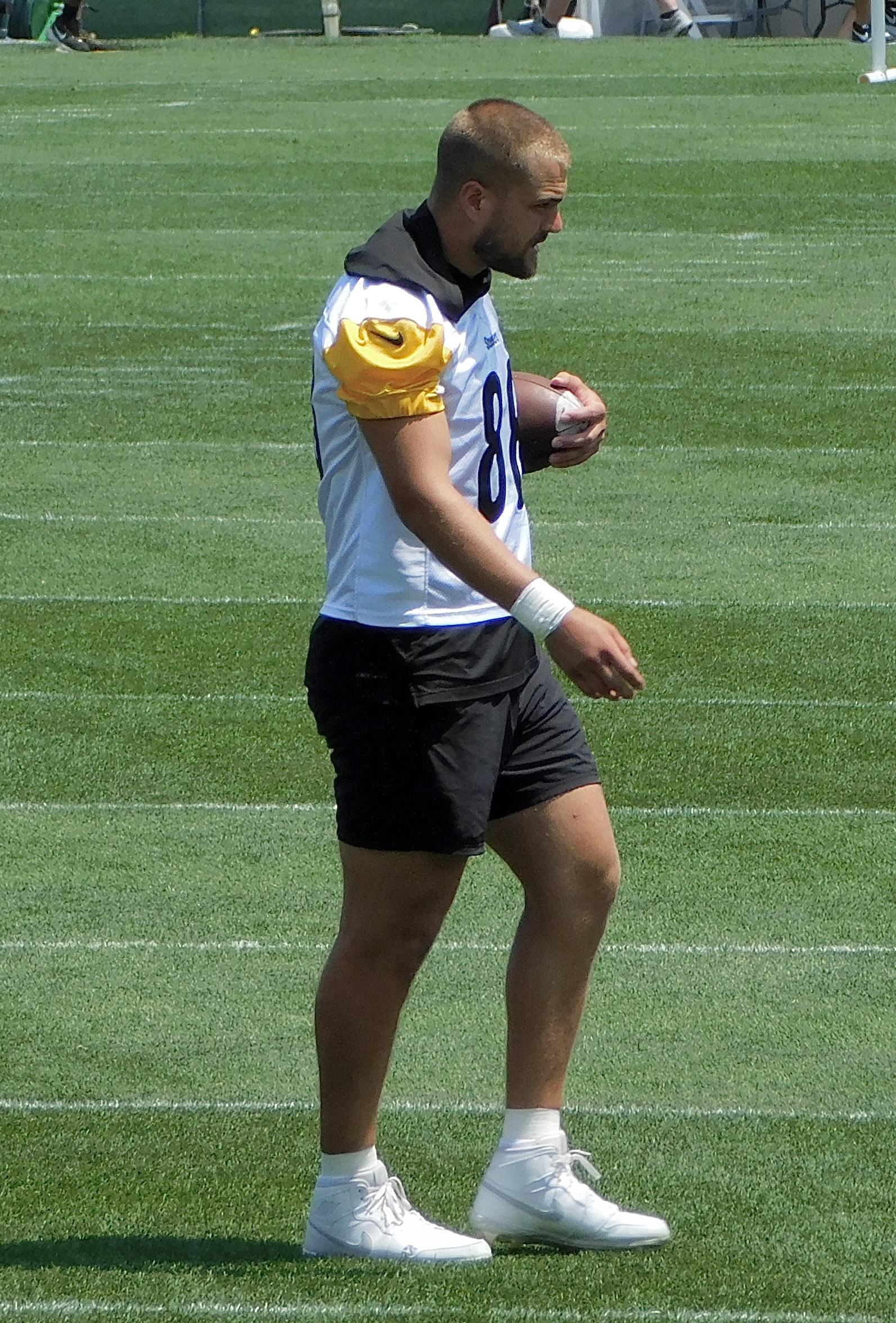
Freiermuth during Steelers training camp

On September 6, 2024, Freiermuth signed a four-year, $48.4 million contract extension with the Steelers, keeping him with the team through the 2028 season. He caught his first touchdown pass of the season on an eight yard pass from Justin Fields during Week 4's 27–24 Steelers loss to the Indianapolis Colts.

In the final moments of Week 5's loss to the Cowboys, the Steelers needed to score a field goal to tie the game with less than ten seconds remaining. Moving downfield to get the ball into field goal range, Steelers receiver George Pickens caught a pass before stopping momentarily and lateraling the ball to Isaac Seumalo. After a series of lateral passes, Freiermuth caught the final pass from Fields before attempting to lateral back to Mason McCormick. The pass fell short of McCormick, being ruled a fumble, which was recovered by the Cowboys as time expired.

Freiermuth ended the regular season having appeared in all 17 games making 65 receptions for 653 yards, seven touchdowns as the Steelers finished with a record of 10–7. This gave Freiermuth the third playoff berth of his career as the Steelers entered as the sixth seeded team in the playoffs. During the AFC wildcard playoff game against the Baltimore Ravens, Freiermuth made three catches for 15 yards as the Steelers lost 28–14, ending their season.

=== 2025 season ===
With the acquisition of Jonnu Smith from the Miami Dolphins in June 2025, Freiermuth and Smith both shared the tight end one spot on the official depth chart released on August 5. He made his first start of the season in Week 1's 34–32 win over the New York Jets. During the game, he made three catches on three targets for 23 yards. On October 16's Thursday Night Football loss to the Cincinnati Bengals at Paycor Stadium, Freiermuth caught his first touchdown pass of the season on a 19 yard reception from quarterback Aaron Rodgers. He finished his first prime time outing of the season as Pittsburgh's leading receiver, catching four passes for 106 yards and two touchdowns. This was also Freiermuth's first game since November 8, 2021 in which he caught multiple touchdown passes in a single game.

== Career statistics ==
=== NFL ===
Legend
**Bold**	Career high

==== Regular season ====
Year	Team	Games		Receiving					Fumbles	
Year	Team	GP	GS	Rec	Yds	Y/R	Lng	TD	Fum	Lost
2021	PIT	16	9	60	497	8.3	24	**7**	1	0
2022	PIT	16	8	63	**732**	**11.6**	57	2	0	0
2023	PIT	12	9	32	308	9.6	29	2	0	0
2024	PIT	17	11	**65**	653	10.0	30	7	**3**	1
2025	PIT	15	6	35	372	10.6	**68**	4	0	0
2026	PIT	7	7	23	200	8.7	22	4	0	0
Career		83	50	284	2,876	10.1	68	26	4	1

==== Postseason ====
Year	Team	Games		Receiving					Fumbles	
Year	Team	GP	GS	Rec	Yds	Y/R	Lng	TD	Fum	Lost
2021	PIT	1	1	4	25	6.3	9	0	0	0
2023	PIT	1	0	**5**	**76**	**15.2**	**33**	0	**1**	0
2024	PIT	1	1	3	15	5.0	9	0	0	0
Career		3	2	12	116	9.7	33	0	1	0

=== College ===
Season	Team	GP	Receiving			
Season	Team	GP	Rec	Yds	Avg	TD
2018	Penn State	12	26	368	14.2	8
2019	Penn State	13	43	507	11.8	7
2020	Penn State	4	23	310	13.5	1
Career		29	92	1,185	12.9	16

== Personal life ==
Freiermuth's uncle, Michael Foley, was a longtime college football coach, most recently as the offensive line coach for UMass. His father, John Freiermuth, played basketball at St. Anselm College in New Hampshire and in 1988 he was named New Hampshire's "Mr. Basketball." His mom is a history teacher and former coach (fifteen seasons) for North Andover High School field hockey. She retired from coaching in 2007 after leading her team to two North sectional titles and a 147–85–66 record. She was also president of the Penn State Football Parents Association. His brother Tim played offensive line for Springfield College and is currently a high school football coach.

He married his wife, Jillian Cataldo, in June 2026.
