= 2022 Pittsburgh Steelers season =

90th season in franchise history

- Owner: The Rooney Family
- General manager: Omar Khan
- Head coach: Mike Tomlin
- Offensive coordinator: Matt Canada
- Defensive coordinator: Teryl Austin
- Home stadium: Acrisure Stadium

Results
- Record: 9–8
- Division place: 3rd AFC North
- Playoffs: Did not qualify
- All-Pros: FS Minkah Fitzpatrick (1st team)
- Pro Bowlers: FS Minkah Fitzpatrick; DT Cameron Heyward; OLB T. J. Watt
- Team MVP: FS Minkah Fitzpatrick
- Team ROY: QB Kenny Pickett

Uniform
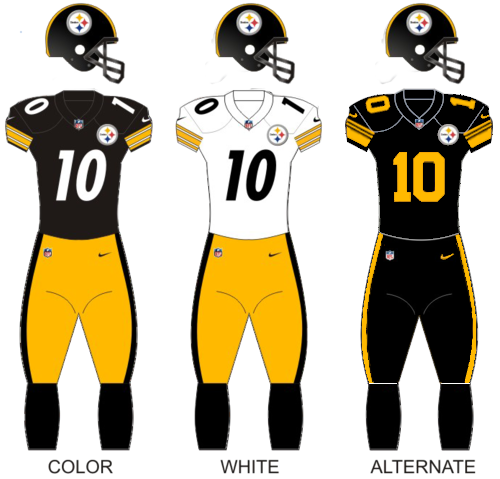

The 2022 season was the Pittsburgh Steelers' 90th in the National Football League (NFL) and their 16th under head coach Mike Tomlin.

This was their first season since 2003 without long-time quarterback Ben Roethlisberger on the roster, as he announced his retirement on January 27, 2022. It was also the first season since 1999 without long-time general manager Kevin Colbert, as he announced on January 28, 2022 that after 22 years with the organization, he would step down following the 2022 NFL draft. He was succeeded by Omar Khan as general manager and Andy Weidl as assistant general manager on May 25, 2022.

The Steelers began their season with a 2–6 record, their worst start since 2013, and failed to improve on their 9–7–1 record from 2021. Despite the initial setback, the Steelers would have a mid-season turnaround and stay in the playoff hunt through Week 18 and finished with a 9–8 record. However, they narrowly missed the playoffs—the Steelers tied with the Miami Dolphins for the last Wild Card spot, but lost the tiebreaker based on the teams' Week 7 head-to-head meeting, won by the Dolphins. They maintained their streak of 19 consecutive non-losing seasons.

In an oddity, the 2022 Steelers played all 17 of their games in the Eastern time zone. The Steelers also traveled by far the fewest miles (6512 miles) of any team in the league in 2022.

== Draft ==
2022 Pittsburgh Steelers draft
Round	Selection	Player	Position	College	Notes
1	20	Kenny Pickett	QB	Pittsburgh	
2	52	George Pickens	WR	Georgia	
3	84	DeMarvin Leal	DT	Texas A&M	
4	125	Traded to Miami (Note: The Steelers traded a fourth-round selection (125th overall) to the Miami Dolphins in exchange for a 2021 fifth-round selection.)			
4	138	Calvin Austin III	WR	Memphis	Compensatory selection (Note: The Steelers received a fourth-round compensatory selection (138th overall) for the loss of LB Bud Dupree the previous offseason.)
5	163	Traded to the New York Jets (Note: The Steelers traded a fifth-round selection (163rd overall) to the New York Jets in exchange for LB Avery Williamson and a seventh-round selection (225th overall).)			
6	198	Traded to Jacksonville (Note: The Steelers traded a sixth-round selection (198th overall) to the Jacksonville Jaguars in exchange for LB Joe Schobert.)			
6	208	Connor Heyward	FB/TE	Michigan State	from Kansas City (Note: The Steelers traded DE Melvin Ingram to the Kansas City Chiefs in exchange for a sixth-round selection (208th overall).)
7	225	Mark Robinson	LB	Ole Miss	from NY Jets
7	241	Chris Oladokun	QB	South Dakota State	

Draft trades

2022 Pittsburgh Steelers undrafted free agents
Name	Position	College	Ref.
Jake Dixon	OT	Duquesne	
Mataeo Durant	RB	Duke	
Donovan Jeter	DT	Michigan	
Tyree Johnson	OLB	Texas A&M	
Trevon Mason	DT	Arizona	
T. D. Moultry	OLB	Auburn	
Chris Owens	G	Alabama	
Carlins Platel	CB	South Carolina	
Nick Sciba	K	Wake Forest	
Tyler Snead	WR	East Carolina	
Chris Steele	CB	USC	
Jordan Tucker	OT	North Carolina	
Jaylen Warren	RB	Oklahoma State	
Bryce Watts	CB	UMass	

== Staff ==
2022 Pittsburgh Steelers staff
Front office: Owner/president – Art Rooney II; Vice president – Art Rooney Jr.; General manager – Omar Khan; Assistant general manager – Andy Weidl; Director of Player Scouting – Mark Sadowski; Player personnel coordinator – Dan Rooney Jr.; Director of college scouting – Dan Colbert; Director of pro scouting – Sheldon White; Assistant director of pro scouting – Dave Pettet; Senior scouting assistants – Phil Kreidler, Kelvin Fisher; Director of football administration – Cole Marcoux; Director of player development – Darrel Young; Head coaches: Head coach – Mike Tomlin; Assistant head coach – John Mitchell; Offensive coaches: Offensive coordinator – Matt Canada; Quarterbacks – Mike Sullivan; Assistant quarterbacks – David Corley Jr.; Running backs – Eddie Faulkner; Wide receivers – Frisman Jackson; Assistant wide receivers – Blaine Stewart; Tight ends – Alfredo Roberts; Offensive line – Pat Meyer; Assistant offensive line – Isaac Williams	Defensive coaches: Defensive coordinator – Teryl Austin; Defensive line – Karl Dunbar; Senior defensive assistant/linebackers – Brian Flores; Inside linebackers – Jerry Olsavsky; Assistant outside linebackers – Denzel Martin; Secondary – Grady Brown; Assistant defensive backs – Gerald Alexander; Special teams coaches: Special teams coordinator – Danny Smith; Quality control – Matt Tomsho; Strength and conditioning: Senior conditioning coordinator – Garrett Giemont; Head strength and conditioning coach – Marcel Pastoor; Strength and conditioning assistant – Rodain Delus

== Final roster ==
2022 Pittsburgh Steelers roster
Quarterbacks (QB): 8 Kenny Pickett; 2 Mason Rudolph; 10 Mitchell Trubisky; Running backs (RB): 22 Najee Harris; 24 Benny Snell; 30 Jaylen Warren; 44 Derek Watt FB; Wide receivers (WR): 13 Miles Boykin; 18 Diontae Johnson; 89 Gunner Olszewski; 14 George Pickens; 82 Steven Sims RS; Tight ends (TE): 88 Pat Freiermuth; 81 Zach Gentry; 83 Connor Heyward	Offensive linemen (OL): 61 Mason Cole C; 78 James Daniels G; 77 Jesse Davis G; 69 Kevin Dotson G; 53 Kendrick Green G; 60 J. C. Hassenauer C; 65 Dan Moore T; 76 Chukwuma Okorafor T; 72 Trent Scott T; Defensive linemen (DL): 57 Montravius Adams NT; 94 Tyson Alualu NT; 97 Cameron Heyward DT; 98 DeMarvin Leal DE; 92 Isaiahh Loudermilk DT; 91 Jonathan Marshall DT; 99 Larry Ogunjobi DE	Linebackers (LB): 55 Devin Bush Jr. ILB; 54 Tae Crowder ILB; 56 Alex Highsmith OLB; 51 Myles Jack ILB; 48 Jamir Jones OLB; 50 Malik Reed OLB; 93 Mark Robinson ILB; 41 Robert Spillane ILB; 90 T. J. Watt OLB; Defensive backs (DB): 34 Terrell Edmunds SS; 39 Minkah Fitzpatrick FS; 23 Damontae Kazee FS; 28 Miles Killebrew SS; 35 Arthur Maulet CB; 21 Tre Norwood FS; 42 James Pierre CB; 37 Elijah Riley SS; 20 Cameron Sutton CB; 29 Levi Wallace CB; Special teams (ST): 9 Chris Boswell K; 6 Pressley Harvin III P; 46 Christian Kuntz LS	Practice squad: 84 Ja'Marcus Bradley WR; 73 Carlos Davis NT; 33 Duke Dawson CB; 68 William Dunkle G; 45 Emeke Egbule OLB; 40 Mark Gilbert CB; 38 Jason Huntley RB; 74 John Leglue G; 62 Ryan McCollum C; 26 Anthony McFarland Jr. RB; 31 Scott Nelson SS; 49 Chapelle Russell ILB; 96 Mika Tafua OLB; 15 Cody White WR; 87 Rodney Williams TE; 79 Renell Wren DT; Reserve: 27 Marcus Allen ILB (IR); 19 Calvin Austin WR (IR); 17 William Jackson III CB (IR); -- Karl Joseph SS (IR); -- Jeremy McNichols RB (IR); -- Anthony Miller WR (IR); -- Carlins Platel CB (IR); 25 Ahkello Witherspoon CB (IR); 95 Chris Wormley DE (IR); Rookies in italics 53 active, 9 reserve, 16 practice squad

== Preseason ==
=== Schedule ===
Week	Date	Opponent	Result	Record	Venue	Recap
1	August 13	Seattle Seahawks	W 32–25	1–0	Acrisure Stadium	Recap
2	August 20	at Jacksonville Jaguars	W 16–15	2–0	TIAA Bank Field	Recap
3	August 28	Detroit Lions	W 19–9	3–0	Acrisure Stadium	Recap

== Regular season ==
=== Schedule ===
Week	Date	Opponent	Result	Record	Venue	Recap
1	September 11	at **Cincinnati Bengals**	**W** 23–20 (OT)	1–0	Paycor Stadium	Recap
2	September 18	New England Patriots	**L** 14–17	1–1	Acrisure Stadium	Recap
3	September 22	at **Cleveland Browns**	**L** 17–29	1–2	FirstEnergy Stadium	Recap
4	October 2	New York Jets	**L** 20–24	1–3	Acrisure Stadium	Recap
5	October 9	at Buffalo Bills	**L** 3–38	1–4	Highmark Stadium	Recap
6	October 16	Tampa Bay Buccaneers	**W** 20–18	2–4	Acrisure Stadium	Recap
7	October 23	at Miami Dolphins	**L** 10–16	2–5	Hard Rock Stadium	Recap
8	October 30	at Philadelphia Eagles	**L** 13–35	2–6	Lincoln Financial Field	Recap
9	Bye					
10	November 13	New Orleans Saints	**W** 20–10	3–6	Acrisure Stadium	Recap
11	November 20	**Cincinnati Bengals**	**L** 30–37	3–7	Acrisure Stadium	Recap
12	November 28	at Indianapolis Colts	**W** 24–17	4–7	Lucas Oil Stadium	Recap
13	December 4	at Atlanta Falcons	**W** 19–16	5–7	Mercedes-Benz Stadium	Recap
14	December 11	**Baltimore Ravens**	**L** 14–16	5–8	Acrisure Stadium	Recap
15	December 18	at Carolina Panthers	**W** 24–16	6–8	Bank of America Stadium	Recap
16	December 24	Las Vegas Raiders	**W** 13–10	7–8	Acrisure Stadium	Recap
17	January 1	at **Baltimore Ravens**	**W** 16–13	8–8	M&T Bank Stadium	Recap
18	January 8	**Cleveland Browns**	**W** 28–14	9–8	Acrisure Stadium	Recap

Due to winning the last 4 games of the season, they were able to achieve 20 consecutive non-losing seasons.

Note: Intra-division opponents are in bold text.

=== Game summaries ===
==== Week 1: at Cincinnati Bengals ====
Week 1: Pittsburgh Steelers at Cincinnati Bengals – Game summary

Quarter	1	2	3	4	OT	Total
**Steelers**	10	7	0	3	3	**23**
Bengals	3	3	8	6	0	**20**

at Paycor Stadium, Cincinnati, Ohio

- Date: September 11
- Game time: 1:00 p.m. EDT
- Game weather: Cloudy, 76 °F (24 °C)
- Game attendance: 65,841
- Referee: Shawn Hochuli
- TV announcers (CBS): Ian Eagle, Charles Davis and Evan Washburn
- Recap, Game Book

Game information

**First quarter**

- PIT – Minkah Fitzpatrick 31-yard interception return, (Chris Boswell kick), 12:43. Steelers 7–0. **Drive: 2 plays, -5 yards, 0:48.**
- CIN – Evan McPherson 59-yard field goal, 7:17. Steelers 7–3. **Drive: 10 plays, 34 yards, 5:26.**
- PIT – Chris Boswell 20-yard field goal, 2:25. Steelers 10–3. **Drive: 5 plays, 32 yards, 1:57.**

**Second quarter**

- PIT – Najee Harris 1-yard pass from Mitch Trubisky (Chris Boswell kick), 8:46. Steelers 17–3. **Drive: 7 plays, 59 yards, 4:22.**
- CIN – Evan McPherson 26-yard field goal, 0:14. Steelers 17–6. **Drive: 9 plays, 57 yards, 3:47.**

**Third quarter**

- CIN – Tyler Boyd 2-yard pass from Joe Burrow (Joe Burrow–Mike Thomas pass), 4:41. Steelers 17–14. **Drive: 9 plays, 46 yards, 5:44.**

**Fourth quarter**

- PIT – Chris Boswell 48-yard field goal, 11:13. Steelers 20–14. **Drive: 7 plays, 16 yards, 2:08.**
- CIN – Ja'Marr Chase 6-yard pass from Joe Burrow (kick blocked), 0:02. Tied 20–20. **Drive: 9 plays, 60 yards, 1:25.**

**Overtime**

- PIT – Chris Boswell 53-yard field goal, 0:00. Steelers 23–20. **Drive: 8 plays, 45 yards, 0:56.**

**Top passers**

- PIT – Mitchell Trubisky – 21/38, 194 yards, TD
- CIN – Joe Burrow – 33/53, 338 yards, 2 TD, 4 INT

**Top rushers**

- PIT – Chase Claypool – 6 rushes, 36 yards
- CIN – Joe Mixon – 27 rushes, 82 yards

**Top receivers**

- PIT – Pat Freiermuth – 5 receptions, 75 yards
- CIN – Jamarr Chase – 10 receptions, 129 yards, TD

The Steelers started the 2022 season against the division rival Bengals in Cincinnati. The Steelers scored first in the first quarter when Minkah Fitzpatrick returned an interception 31 yards for a touchdown to make it 7–0. The Bengals made it 7–3 when Evan McPhearson made a 59-yard field goal. The Steelers then went ahead 10–3 after Chris Boswell kicked a 20-yard field goal. In the second quarter, the Steelers moved ahead 17–3 after Mitchell Trubisky found Najee Harris on a 1-yard touchdown pass. The Bengals drew closer at halftime when McPhearson made a 26-yard field goal to make it 17–6. After the break, the Bengals came within 3 in the third quarter when Joe Burrow found Tyler Boyd on a 2-yard touchdown pass (with a successful 2-point conversion) to make it 17–14. In the fourth quarter, the Steelers moved ahead by 6 when Boswell kicked a 48-yard field goal to make it 20–14. Later on in the quarter, the Bengals tied the game when Burrow found Ja'Marr Chase on a 6-yard touchdown pass (with a blocked PAT) to send the game into overtime tied at 20–20. After going back and forth on possessions, the Steelers managed to win the game when Boswell kicked the game winning 53-yard field goal with seconds left to make the final score 23–20.

With their 3-game losing streak against the Bengals snapped, the Steelers started their season 1–0. Over the course of the game, the Steelers forced 5 turnovers.

==== Week 2: vs. New England Patriots ====
Week 2: New England Patriots at Pittsburgh Steelers – Game Summary

Quarter	1	2	3	4	Total
**Patriots**	3	7	7	0	**17**
Steelers	0	3	3	8	**14**

at Acrisure Stadium, Pittsburgh, Pennsylvania

- Date: September 18
- Game time: 1:00 p.m. EDT
- Game weather: Mostly cloudy, 81 °F (27 °C)
- Game attendance: 67,307
- Referee: Land Clark
- TV announcers (CBS): Ian Eagle, Charles Davis, and Evan Washburn
- Recap, Game Book

Game information

**First quarter**

- NE – Nick Folk 28-yard field goal, 6:42. Patriots 3–0. **Drive: 13 plays, 71 yards, 6:45**

**Second quarter**

- PIT – Chris Boswell 36-yard field goal, 8:35. Tied 3–3. **Drive: 16 plays, 48 yards, 7:07**
- NE – Nelson Agholor 44-yard pass from Mac Jones (Nick Folk kick), 0:22. Patriots 10–3. **Drive: 8 plays, 74 yards, 2:46**

**Third quarter**

- PIT – Chris Boswell 52-yard field goal, 5:44. Patriots 10–6. **Drive: 7 plays, 25 yards, 3:33**
- NE – Damien Harris 2-yard run (Nick Folk kick), 2:47. Patriots 17–6. **Drive: 3 plays, 10 yards, 1:11**

**Fourth quarter**

- PIT – Pat Freiermuth 8-yard pass from Mitchell Trubisky (Mitchell Trubisky–Diontae Johnson pass), 14:58 Patriots 17–14. **Drive: 9 plays, 75 yards, 2:49**

**Top passer**

- NE – Mac Jones – 21/35, 252 yards, TD, INT
- PIT – Mitchell Trubisky – 21/33, 168 yards, TD, INT

**Top rusher**

- NE – Damien Harris – 11 rushes, 71 yards, TD
- PIT – Najee Harris – 15 rushes, 49 yards

**Top receiver**

- NE – Nelson Agholor – 6 receptions, 110 yards, TD
- PIT – Diontae Johnson – 6 receptions, 57 yards

After a tough win in Week 1, the Steelers went home for their opener against the Patriots. The Patriots scored first as Nick Folk kicked a 28-yard field goal 3–0 for the only score of the period. The Steelers tied it up in the second quarter when Chris Boswell kicked a 36-yard field goal to make it 3–3. The Patriots then took the lead when Mac Jones found Nelson Agholor on a 44-yard touchdown pass to make it 10–3 at halftime. In the third quarter, the Steelers came within 4 when Boswell kicked a 52-yard field goal to make it 10–6. Though, the Patriots would move ahead by double digits later on when Damien Harris ran for a 2-yard touchdown to make it 17–6. The Steelers were able to come within 3 after Mitchell Trubisky found Pat Freiermuth on an 8-yard touchdown pass (with a successful 2-point conversion) to make it 17–14. Though, they were unable to complete the comeback as the Patriots held on for the victory and ran out the clock.

With the loss, the Steelers fell to 1–1.

==== Week 3: at Cleveland Browns ====
Week 3: Pittsburgh Steelers at Cleveland Browns – Game Summary

Quarter	1	2	3	4	Total
Steelers	0	14	0	3	**17**
**Browns**	7	6	3	13	**29**

at FirstEnergy Stadium, Cleveland, Ohio

- Date: September 22
- Game time: 8:15 p.m. EDT
- Game weather: Cloudy, 60 °F (16 °C)
- Game attendance: 67,431
- Referee: Clay Martin
- TV announcers (WPXI/Prime Video): Al Michaels, Kirk Herbstreit and Kaylee Hartung
- Recap, Game Book

Game information

**First quarter**

- CLE – Amari Cooper 11-yard pass from Jacoby Brissett (Cade York kick), 2:54. Browns 7–0. **Drive: 3 plays, 60 yards, 3:01**

**Second quarter**

- PIT – Najee Harris 5-yard run (Chris Boswell kick), 14:55. Tied 7–7. **Drive: 7 plays, 75 yards, 2:59**
- CLE – David Njoku 7-yard pass from Jacoby Brissett (kick failed), 8:58. Browns 13–7, **Drive: 12 plays, 79 yards, 5:57**
- PIT – Mitchell Trubisky 1-yard run (Chris Boswell kick), 3:50. Steelers 14–13. **Drive: 10 plays, 75 yards, 5:08**

**Third quarter**

- CLE – Cade York 34-yard field goal, 2:31. Browns 16–14. **Drive: 14 plays, 70 yards, 7:02**

**Fourth quarter**

- CLE – Nick Chubb 1-yard run (Cade York kick), 9:29. Browns 23–14. **Drive: 11 plays, 80 yards, 6:35**
- PIT – Chris Boswell 34-yard field goal, 1:48. Browns 23–17. **Drive: 7 plays, 63 yards, 1:25**
- CLE – Denzel Ward fumble recovery in end zone, 0:00. Browns 29–17.

**Top passers**

- PIT – Mitchell Trubisky – 20/32, 207 yards
- CLE – Jacoby Brissett – 21/31, 220 yards, 2 TD

**Top rushers**

- PIT – Najee Harris – 15 rushes, 56 yards, TD
- CLE – Nick Chubb – 23 rushes, 113 yards, TD

**Top receivers**

- PIT – Diontae Johnson – 8 receptions, 84 yards
- CLE – Amari Cooper – 7 receptions, 101 yards, TD

After a tough loss at home to the Patriots, the Steelers traveled to Cleveland for Round 1 against the Browns. In the first quarter, the Browns scored the only points when Jacoby Brissett found Amari Cooper on an 11-yard touchdown to make it 7–0. The Steelers tied the game up in the second quarter when Najee Harris ran for a 5-yard touchdown to make it 7–7. The Browns retook the lead when Brissett found David Njoku on a 7-yard pass (with a failed PAT) to make it 13–7. The Steelers then took the lead before halftime when Mitchell Trubisky ran for a 1-yard touchdown to make it 14–13. In the third quarter, the Browns retook the lead when Cade York kicked a 34-yard field goal to make it 16–14 for the quarter's only score. They increased their lead in the fourth quarter when Nick Chubb ran for a 1-yard touchdown to make it 23–14. The Steelers came within 6 when Chris Boswell made a 34-yard field goal to make it 23–17. The final play of the game came with no time left when Denzel Ward recovered a fumble in the end zone to make the final score 29–17.

With the loss, the Steelers fell to 1–2.

==== Week 4: vs. New York Jets ====
Week 4: New York Jets at Pittsburgh Steelers – Game Summary

Quarter	1	2	3	4	Total
**Jets**	3	7	0	14	**24**
Steelers	0	6	7	7	**20**

at Acrisure Stadium, Pittsburgh, Pennsylvania

- Date: October 2
- Game time: 1:00 p.m. EDT
- Game weather: Cloudy, 58 °F (14 °C)
- Game attendance: 66,578
- Referee: Brad Rogers
- TV announcers (CBS): Greg Gumbel, Adam Archuleta and AJ Ross
- Recap, Game Book

Game information

**First quarter**

- NYJ – Greg Zuerlein 38-yard field goal, 4:03. Jets 3–0. **Drive: 7 plays, 16 yards, 3:32.**

**Second quarter**

- NYJ – Zach Wilson 2-yard from Braxton Berrios (Greg Zuerlein kick), 12:37. Jets 10–0. **Drive: 9 plays, 70 yards, 4:28.**
- PIT – Chris Boswell 51-yard field goal, 8:30. Jets 10–3. **Drive: 10 plays, 42 yards, 4:07.**
- PIT – Chris Boswell 59-yard pass field goal, 0:00. Jets 10–6. **Drive: 3 plays, 29 yards, 0:20.**

**Third quarter**

- PIT – Kenny Pickett 1-yard run (Chris Boswell kick), 7:18. Steelers 13–10. **Drive: 3 plays, 4 yards, 1:27.**

**Fourth quarter**

- PIT – Kenny Pickett 2-yard run (Chris Boswell kick), 13:36. Steelers 20–10. **Drive: 12 plays, 82 yards, 6:31.**
- NYJ – Corey Davis 5-yard pass from Zach Wilson (Greg Zuerlein kick), 7:31. Steelers 20–17. **Drive: 11 plays, 81 yards, 6:05.**
- NYJ – Breece Hall 2-yard run (Greg Zuerlein kick), 0:16. Jets 24–20. **Drive: 10 plays, 65 yards, 3:18.**

**Top passers**

- NYJ – Zach Wilson – 18/36, 252 yards, TD, 2 INT
- PIT – Kenny Pickett – 10/13, 120 yards, 3 INT

**Top rushers**

- NYJ – Breece Hall – 17 rushes, 66 yards, TD
- PIT – Najee Harris – 18 rushes, 74 yards

**Top receivers**

- NYJ – Corey Davis – 5 receptions, 74 yards, TD
- PIT – Pat Freiermuth – 7 receptions, 85 yards

The Steelers headed home for a game against the Jets. The Jets scored first in the first quarter when Greg Zuerlein kicked a 38-yard field goal to make it 3–0 for the quarter's only score. They made it 10–0 in the second quarter when Zach Wilson connected with Braxton Berrios on a 2-yard touchdown pass. The Steelers were able to get on the board before halftime in spite of 2 field goals from Boswell: From 51 and 59 yards out to make it 10–6. In the third quarter, the Steelers scored the only points when rookie QB Kenny Pickett ran for a 1-yard touchdown to make it 13–10. In the fourth quarter, they increased their lead when Pickett ran for a 2-yard touchdown to make it 20–10. The Jets drew closer when Wilson found Corey Davis on a 5-yard touchdown pass, making the score 20–17. They later took the lead when Breece Hall ran for a 2-yard touchdown to make it 24–20. The Steelers were able to drive down the field in the final seconds. However, Pickett would throw the game-losing interception in the end zone and it sealed yet another loss for the team.

With the loss, the Steelers fell to 1–3.

==== Week 5: at Buffalo Bills ====
Week 5: Pittsburgh Steelers at Buffalo Bills – Game Summary

Quarter	1	2	3	4	Total
Steelers	3	0	0	0	**3**
**Bills**	10	21	0	7	**38**

at Highmark Stadium, Orchard Park, New York

- Date: October 9
- Game time: 1:00 p.m. EDT
- Game weather: Mostly cloudy, 55 °F (13 °C)
- Game attendance: 70,764
- Referee: John Hussey
- TV announcers (CBS): Jim Nantz, Tony Romo and Tracy Wolfson
- Recap, Game Book

Game information

**First quarter**

- BUF – Gabe Davis 98-yard pass from Josh Allen (Tyler Bass kick), 13:56. Bills 7–0. **Drive: 3 plays, 98 yards, 1:04.**
- PIT – Chris Boswell 29-yard field goal, 5:38. Bills 7–3. **Drive: 12 plays, 50 yards, 6:18.**
- BUF – Tyler Bass 35-yard field goal, 2:41. Bills 10–3. **Drive: 7 plays, 48 yards, 2:57.**

**Second quarter**

- BUF – Gabe Davis 62-yard pass from Josh Allen (Tyler Bass kick), 9:29. Bills 17–3. **Drive: 1 plays, 62 yards, 0:10.**
- BUF – Stefon Diggs 15-yard pass from Josh Allen (Tyler Bass kick), 7:20. Bills 24–3. **Drive: 2 plays, 53 yards, 0:33.**
- BUF – Khalil Shakir 24-yard pass from Josh Allen (Tyler Bass kick), 1:02. Bills 31–3. **Drive: 8 plays, 77 yards, 2:37.**

**Third quarter**

- No scoring plays.

**Fourth quarter**

- BUF – James Cook 24-yard run (Tyler Bass kick), 14:03. Bills 38–3. **Drive: 2 plays, 65 yards, 0:57.**

**Top passers**

- PIT – Kenny Pickett – 34/52, 327 yards, INT
- BUF – Josh Allen – 20/31, 424 yards, 4 TD, INT

**Top rushers**

- PIT – Jaylen Warren – 5 rushes, 24 yards
- BUF – Devin Singletary – 11 rushes, 73 yards

**Top receivers**

- PIT – George Pickens – 6 receptions, 83 yards
- BUF – Gabe Davis – 3 receptions, 171 yards, 2 TD

After a tough loss at home, the Steelers then traveled to take on the Bills. The Bills scored first when Josh Allen found Gabe Davis on a 98-yard touchdown pass to make it 7–0. The Steelers got on the board for their only points of the game when Chris Boswell kicked a 29-yard field goal to make it 7–3. For the rest of the game, it was all Bills as they outscored the Steelers 31–0 to make the final score 38–3.

With the loss, the Steelers fell to 1–4. This would be the largest margin of loss in Mike Tomlin's coaching career. This would also be the team's first game without a touchdown since Week 1 of the 2019 season.

==== Week 6: vs. Tampa Bay Buccaneers ====
Week 6: Tampa Bay Buccaneers at Pittsburgh Steelers – Game Summary

Quarter	1	2	3	4	Total
Buccaneers	3	6	3	6	**18**
**Steelers**	7	3	3	7	**20**

at Acrisure Stadium, Pittsburgh, Pennsylvania

- Date: October 16
- Game time: 1:00 p.m. EDT
- Game weather: Cloudy, 62 °F (17 °C)
- Game attendance: 67,307
- Referee: Shawn Smith
- TV announcers (Fox): Brandon Gaudin, Daryl Johnston and Pam Oliver
- Recap, Game Book

Game information

**First quarter**

- PIT – Najee Harris 6-yard pass from Kenny Pickett (Chris Boswell kick), 7:38. Steelers 7–0. **Drive: 11 plays, 66 yards, 6:24.**
- TB – Ryan Succop 30-yard field goal, 2:50. Steelers 7–3. **Drive: 12 plays, 60 yards, 4:48.**

**Second quarter**

- TB – Ryan Succop 27-yard field goal, 11:01. Steelers 7–6. **Drive: 11 plays, 45 yards, 5:24.**
- PIT – Chris Boswell 55-yard field goal, 4:07. Steelers 10–6. **Drive: 12 plays, 44 yards, 6:54.**
- TB – Ryan Succop 54-yard field goal, 0:00. Steelers 10–9. **Drive: 4 plays, 15 yards, 0:23.**

**Third quarter**

- PIT – Chris Boswell 25-yard field goal, 13:55. Steelers 13–9. **Drive: 4 plays, 5 yards, 1:05.**
- TB – Ryan Succop 24-yard field goal, 7:24. Steelers 13–12. **Drive: 14 plays, 69 yards, 6:31.**

**Fourth quarter**

- PIT – Chase Claypool 6-yard pass from Mitchell Trubisky (Chris Boswell kick), 9:55. Steelers 20–12. **Drive: 8 plays, 71 yards, 3:43.**
- TB – Leonard Fournette 8-yard pass from Tom Brady (pass failed), 4:38. Steelers 20–18. **Drive: 14 plays, 73 yards, 5:17.**

**Top passers**

- TB – Tom Brady – 25/40, 253 yards, TD
- PIT – Kenny Pickett – 11/18, 67 yards, TD

**Top rushers**

- TB – Leonard Fournette – 21 rushes, 63 yards
- PIT – Najee Harris – 14 rushes, 42 yards

**Top receivers**

- TB – Chris Godwin – 6 receptions, 95 yards
- PIT – Chase Claypool – 7 receptions, 96 yards, TD

After a huge loss on the road, the Steelers returned home to face off against the Tom Brady-led Buccaneers. In the first quarter, the Steelers scored first when Najee Harris caught a 6-yard touchdown pass from Kenny Pickett to make the lead 7–0. The Bucs made it 7–3 when Ryan Succop kicked a 30-yard field goal. Succop got the Bucs closer in the second quarter when he kicked a 27-yard field goal to make it 7–6. Though, the Steelers pulled away when Chris Boswell kicked a 55-yard field goal to make it 10–6. As halftime approached, Succop got the Bucs within a point when he kicked a 54-yard field goal to make it 10–9. In the third quarter, the Steelers got back to work when Boswell kicked a 25-yard field goal to make it 13–9. Again, the Bucs came within a point when Succop kicked a 24-yard field goal to make it 13–12. Despite losing Pickett for the game, in the fourth quarter, Mitchell Trubisky came out and threw a 6-yard touchdown pass to Chase Claypool to make it 20–12. The Bucs would however score the remaining points of the game when Brady found Leonard Fournette on an 11-yard touchdown pass (with a failed 2-point conversion) to make the final score 20–18.

With the win, the Steelers improved to 2–4. It was the Steelers' first home win against the Buccaneers since 2006.

==== Week 7: at Miami Dolphins ====
Week 7: Pittsburgh Steelers at Miami Dolphins – Game summary

Quarter	1	2	3	4	Total
Steelers	0	10	0	0	**10**
**Dolphins**	13	3	0	0	**16**

at Hard Rock Stadium, Miami Gardens, Florida

- Date: October 23
- Game time: 8:20 p.m. EDT
- Game weather: Partly cloudy, 78 °F (26 °C)
- Game attendance: 66,224
- Referee: Scott Novak
- TV announcers (NBC): Mike Tirico, Cris Collinsworth and Melissa Stark
- Recap, Game Book

Game information

**First quarter**

- MIA – Raheem Mostert 8-yard pass from Tua Tagovailoa (Jason Sanders kick), 10:45. Dolphins 7–0. **Drive: 9 plays, 71 yards, 4:15.**
- MIA – Jason Sanders 24-yard field goal, 5:32. Dolphins 10–0. **Drive: 8 plays, 59 yards, 3:59.**
- MIA – Jason Sanders 42-yard field goal, 2:27. Dolphins 13–0. **Drive: 7 plays, 30 yards, 2:12.**

**Second quarter**

- PIT – Chris Boswell 45-yard field goal, 11:44. Dolphins 13–3. **Drive: 12 plays, 48 yards, 5:43.**
- PIT – George Pickens 7-yard pass from Kenny Pickett (Chris Boswell kick), 1:50. Dolphins 13–10. **Drive: 13 plays, 86 yards, 7:29.**
- MIA – Jason Sanders 47-yard field goal, 0:02. Dolphins 16–10. **Drive: 8 plays, 56 yards, 1:48.**

**Third quarter**

- No scoring plays.

**Fourth quarter**

- No scoring plays.

**Top passers**

- PIT – Kenny Pickett – 32/44, 257 yards, TD, 3 INT
- MIA – Tua Tagovailoa – 21/35, 261 yards, TD

**Top rushers**

- PIT – Najee Harris – 17 rushes, 65 yards
- MIA – Raheem Mostert – 16 rushes, 79 yards

**Top receivers**

- PIT – Pat Freiermuth – 8 receptions, 75 yards
- MIA – Jaylen Waddle – 4 receptions, 88 yards

The Dolphins opened a 13–0 lead in the first quarter. The Steelers were able to shorten the lead to 13–10, but not long before the Dolphins made it 16–10 at halftime. Both teams went scoreless in the second half, resulting in that final score. With the loss, the Steelers fell to 2–5, and 0–4 against the AFC East.

==== Week 8: at Philadelphia Eagles ====
Week 8: Pittsburgh Steelers at Philadelphia Eagles – Game summary

Quarter	1	2	3	4	Total
Steelers	7	3	3	0	**13**
**Eagles**	7	14	7	7	**35**

at Lincoln Financial Field, Philadelphia, Pennsylvania

- Date: October 30
- Game time: 1:00 p.m. EDT
- Game weather: Sunny, 61 °F (16 °C)
- Game attendance: 69,879
- Referee: Clete Blakeman
- TV announcers (CBS): Jim Nantz, Tony Romo and Tracy Wolfson
- Recap, Game Book

Game information

**First quarter**

- PHI – A. J. Brown 39-yard pass from Jalen Hurts (Jake Elliott kick), 9:23. Eagles 7–0. **Drive: 9 plays, 68 yards, 3:46.**
- PIT – Derek Watt 1-yard pass from Chase Claypool (Nick Sciba kick), 1:57. Tied 7–7. **Drive: 13 plays, 75 yards, 7:26.**

**Second quarter**

- PHI – A. J. Brown 27-yard pass from Jalen Hurts (Jake Elliott kick), 12:48. Eagles 14–7. **Drive: 11 plays, 79 yards, 4:09.**
- PHI – A. J. Brown 29-yard pass from Jalen Hurts (Jake Elliott kick), 6:13. Eagles 21–7. **Drive: 3 plays, 60 yards, 1:09.**
- PIT – Nick Sciba 38-yard field goal, 1:02. Eagles 21–10. **Drive: 12 plays, 45 yards, 5:11.**

**Third quarter**

- PHI – Zach Pascal 34-yard pass from Jalen Hurts (Jake Elliott kick), 12:53. Eagles 28–10. **Drive: 5 plays, 75 yards, 2:07.**
- PIT – Nick Sciba 29-yard field goal, 5:55. Eagles 28–13. **Drive: 15 plays, 64 yards, 6:58.**

**Fourth quarter**

- PHI – Miles Sanders 11-yard rush (Jake Elliott kick), 12:35. Eagles 35–13. **Drive: 2 plays, 54 yards, 0:55.**

**Top passers**

- PIT – Kenny Pickett – 25/38, 191 yards, INT
- PHI – Jalen Hurts – 19/28, 285 yards, 4 TD

**Top rushers**

- PIT – Jaylen Warren – 6 rushes, 50 yards
- PHI – Miles Sanders – 9 rushes, 78 yards, TD

**Top receivers**

- PIT – Pat Freiermuth – 4 receptions, 57 yards
- PHI – A. J. Brown – 6 receptions, 156 yards, 3 TD

The Steelers traveled to Philadelphia to take on the Eagles. In the first quarter, the Eagles scored first when Jalen Hurts found A. J. Brown on a 39-yard touchdown pass to make it 7–0. The Steelers tied it at 7–7 later on in the quarter when Derek Watt found Chase Claypool on a 1-yard touchdown pass. In the second quarter, the Eagles were able to go up by double digits when Hurts and Brown connected on 2 touchdowns: from 27 and 29 yards out to make it 21–7. The Steelers shortened their deficit to 11 when Nick Sciba kicked a 38-yard field goal to make it 21–10 at halftime. In the third quarter, the Eagles went back to work when Hurts found Zach Pascal on a 34-yard touchdown pass to make it 28–10. Sciba then got the Steelers closer when he kicked a 29-yard field goal to make it 28–13. In the fourth quarter, the Eagles scored the only points when Miles Sanders ran for an 11-yard touchdown to make the final score 35–13, and the Steelers could not succeed at spoiling the Eagles' perfect record.

With their 9th loss in Philadelphia, the Steelers went into their bye week at 2–6.

==== Week 10: vs. New Orleans Saints ====
Week 10: New Orleans Saints at Pittsburgh Steelers – Game summary

Quarter	1	2	3	4	Total
Saints	0	10	0	0	**10**
**Steelers**	7	3	0	10	**20**

at Acrisure Stadium, Pittsburgh, Pennsylvania

- Date: November 13
- Game time: 1:00 p.m. EST
- Game weather: Cloudy, 41 °F (5 °C)
- Game attendance: 66,544
- Referee: Carl Cheffers
- TV announcers (Fox): Adam Amin, Mark Schlereth and Kristina Pink
- Recap, Game Book

Game information

**First quarter**

- PIT – George Pickens 1-yard rush (Matthew Wright kick), 5:06. Steelers 7–0. **Drive: 12 plays, 57 yards, 5:53.**

**Second quarter**

- PIT – Matthew Wright 33-yard field goal, 14:17. Steelers 10–0. **Drive: 8 plays, 65 yards, 2:54.**
- NO – Wil Lutz 44-yard field goal, 6:40. Steelers 10–3. **Drive: 9 plays, 40 yards, 4:04.**
- NO – Juwan Johnson 15-yard pass from Andy Dalton (Wil Lutz kick), 0:19. Tied 10–10. **Drive: 6 plays, 71 yards, 1:34.**

**Third quarter**

- No scoring plays.

**Fourth quarter**

- PIT – Matthew Wright 33-yard field goal, 13:43. Steelers 13–10. **Drive: 11 plays, 83 yards, 6:22.**
- PIT – Kenny Pickett 1-yard rush (Matthew Wright kick), Steelers 20–10. **Drive: 8 plays, 44 yards, 3:38.**

**Top passers**

- NO – Andy Dalton – 17/27, 174 yards, TD, 2 INT
- PIT – Kenny Pickett – 18/30, 199 yards

**Top rushers**

- NO – Alvin Kamara – 8 rushes, 26 yards
- PIT – Najee Harris – 20 rushes, 99 yards

**Top receivers**

- NO – Juwan Johnson – 5 receptions, 44 yards, TD
- PIT – Diontae Johnson – 4 receptions, 63 yards

After coming off of their bye week, the Steelers returned home for a game against the Saints. The Steelers made it 7–0 in the first quarter when George Pickens ran for a 1-yard touchdown. They made it 10–0 in the second quarter when Matthew Wright kicked a 33-yard field goal. The Saints were able to tie the game up before halftime at 10–10 when Wil Lutz kicked a 44-yard field goal, followed up by Andy Dalton and Juwan Johnson hooking up on a 15-yard touchdown pass. After a scoreless third quarter, the Steelers scored the remaining points in the fourth when Matthew Wright kicked another 33-yard field goal to make it 13–10 and then finally Kenny Pickett ran for a 1-yard touchdown to make the final score 20–10. This game marked the return of T.J. Watt, who missed the previous 7 games.

With the win, the Steelers improved to 3–6. It was the Steelers' first win against the Saints in Pittsburgh, and their first win against the Saints overall, both since 2006.

Also with the win, the Steelers have now won at least one game against all other 31 teams since Mike Tomlin's hiring.

==== Week 11: vs. Cincinnati Bengals ====
Week 11: Cincinnati Bengals at Pittsburgh Steelers – Game summary

Quarter	1	2	3	4	Total
**Bengals**	10	7	10	10	**37**
Steelers	3	17	3	7	**30**

at Acrisure Stadium, Pittsburgh, Pennsylvania

- Date: November 20
- Game time: 4:25 p.m. EST
- Game weather: Mostly sunny, 32 °F (0 °C)
- Game attendance: 66,401
- Referee: Brad Allen
- TV announcers (CBS): Greg Gumbel, Adam Archuleta and AJ Ross
- Recap, Game Book

Game information

**First quarter**

- CIN – Evan McPherson 45-yard field goal, 8:54. Bengals 3–0. **Drive: 5 plays, 30 yards, 2:09.**
- PIT – Matthew Wright 42-yard field goal, 4:37. Tied 3–3. **Drive: 9 plays, 41 yards, 4:17.**
- CIN – Samaje Perine 29-yard pass from Joe Burrow (Evan McPherson kick), 0:39. Bengals 10–3. **Drive: 6 plays, 79 yards, 3:58.**

**Second quarter**

- PIT – Najee Harris 19-yard run (Matthew Wright kick), 12:58. Tied 10–10. **Drive: 8 plays, 56 yards, 2:41.**
- CIN – Samaje Perine 11-yard pass from Joe Burrow (Evan McPherson kick), 6:38. Bengals 17–10. **Drive: 10 plays, 92 yards, 6:20.**
- PIT – George Pickens 24-yard pass from Kenny Pickett (Matthew Wright kick), 1:47. Tied 17–17. **Drive: 10 plays, 65 yards, 4:51.**
- PIT – Matthew Wright 30-yard field goal, 0:00. Steelers 20–17. **Drive: 5 plays, 44 yards, 0:31.**

**Third quarter**

- CIN – Trenton Irwin 1-yard pass from Joe Burrow (Evan McPherson kick), 7:02. Bengals 24–20. **Drive: 7 plays, 59 yards, 3:05.**
- PIT – Matthew Wright 34-yard field goal, 4:28. Bengals 24–23. **Drive: 4 plays, 6 yards, 0:55.**
- CIN – Evan McPherson 54-yard field goal, 0:31. Bengals 27–23. **Drive: 9 plays, 22 yards, 3:57.**

**Fourth quarter**

- CIN – Samaje Perine 6-yard pass from Joe Burrow (Evan McPherson kick), 4:30. Bengals 34–23. **Drive: 8 plays, 93 yards, 5:03.**
- CIN – Evan McPherson 44-yard field goal, 3:18. Bengals 37–23. **Drive: 4 plays, 2 yards, 0:17.**
- PIT – Najee Harris 1-yard run (Matthew Wright kick), 0:45. Bengals 37–30. **Drive: 9 plays, 72 yards, 2:33.**

**Top passers**

- CIN – Joe Burrow – 24/39, 355 yards, 4 TD, 2 INT
- PIT – Kenny Pickett – 25/42, 265 yards, TD

**Top rushers**

- CIN – Samaje Perine – 11 rushes, 30 yards
- PIT – Najee Harris – 20 rushes, 90 yards, 2 TD

**Top receivers**

- CIN – Tee Higgins – 9 receptions, 148 yards
- PIT – George Pickens – 4 receptions, 83 yards

After a tough home win, the Steelers stayed at home for Round 2 against the Bengals. In the first quarter, the Bengals scored first when Evan McPherson kicked a 45-yard field goal to make it 3–0. The Steelers then tied it up when Matthew Wright kicked a 42-yard field goal to make it 3–3. The Bengals then moved back into the lead when Joe Burrow found Samaje Berine on a 29-yard touchdown pass to make it 10–3. In the second quarter, the Steelers tied the game up at 10–10 when Najee Harris ran for a 19-yard touchdown. The Bengals then moved into the lead again when Burrow and Berine connected on a 11-yard touchdown pass to make it 17–10. The Steelers were able to tie it up at 17–17 when Kenny Pickett found George Pickens on a 24-yard touchdown pass. They took the lead at halftime 20–17 when Wright kicked a 30-yard field goal. In the third quarter, the Bengals retook the lead when Burrow found Trent Irwin on a 1-yard touchdown pass to make it 24–20. The Steelers drew closer when Wright kicked a 34-yard field goal to make it 24–23. The Bengals then pulled away when McPherson kicked a 54-yard field goal to make it 27–23. In the fourth quarter, the Bengals scored a couple more times: Burrow and Berine connected for a third time on a 6-yard touchdown pass for a 34–23 lead and then McPherson kicked a 44-yard field goal to make it 37–23. The Steelers concluded the scoring of the game when Harris ran for a 1-yard touchdown to make the final score 37–30.

With the loss, the Steelers fell to 3–7. It would be the team's worst 10-game start since 2003 and in turn the worst 10-game start under head coach Mike Tomlin.

==== Week 12: at Indianapolis Colts ====
Week 12: Pittsburgh Steelers at Indianapolis Colts – Game summary

Quarter	1	2	3	4	Total
**Steelers**	3	13	0	8	**24**
Colts	0	3	14	0	**17**

at Lucas Oil Stadium, Indianapolis, Indiana

- Date: November 28
- Game time: 8:15 p.m. EST
- Game weather: None (retractable roof closed)
- Game attendance: 65,982
- Referee: Bill Vinovich
- TV announcers (WPXI/ESPN): Joe Buck, Troy Aikman and Lisa Salters
- Recap, Game Book

Game information

**First quarter**

- PIT – Matthew Wright 45-yard field goal, 9:27. Steelers 3–0. **Drive: 10 plays, 48 yards, 5:33.**

**Second quarter**

- PIT – Matthew Wright 52-yard field goal, 14:09. Steelers 6–0. **Drive: 8 plays, 27 yards, 3:51.**
- PIT – Najee Harris 6-yard run (Matthew Wright kick), 7:46. Steelers 13–0. **Drive: 10 plays, 79 yards, 5:31.**
- IND – Chase McLaughlin 51-yard field goal, 3:48. Steelers 13–3. **Drive: 10 plays, 42 yards, 3:58.**
- PIT – Matthew Wright 25-yard field goal, 0:56. Steelers 16–3. **Drive: 12 plays, 68 yards, 2:52.**

**Third quarter**

- IND – Jonathan Taylor 2-yard run (Chase McLaughlin kick), 13:04. Steelers 16–10. **Drive: 4 plays, 9 yards, 1:56.**
- IND – Michael Pittman Jr. 6-yard pass from Matt Ryan (Chase McLaughlin kick), 0:16. Colts 17–16. **Drive: 6 plays, 55 yards, 2:41.**

**Fourth quarter**

- PIT – Benny Snell 2-yard run (Kenny Pickett-George Pickens pass), 9:55. Steelers 24–17. **Drive: 11 plays, 75 yards, 5:21.**

**Top passers**

- PIT – Kenny Pickett – 20/28, 174 yards
- IND – Matt Ryan – 22/34, 199 yards, TD, INT

**Top rushers**

- PIT – Benny Snell – 12 rushes, 62 yards, TD
- IND – Jonathan Taylor – 20 rushes, 86 yards, TD

**Top receivers**

- PIT – George Pickens – 3 receptions, 57 yards
- IND – Jelani Woods – 8 receptions, 98 yards

After a tough loss at home, the Steelers traveled for a game against the Colts on Monday Night Football. The Steelers were able to make a 13–0 lead well into the first 2 quarters by way of Matthew Wright's 45 and 52 yard field goals and then a 6-yard touchdown run by Najee Harris. The Colts were able to get on the board in the second when Chase McLaughlin kicked a 51-yard field goal to make it 13–3. The Steelers pulled away as Wright closed the scoring of the first half with another field goal from 25 yards out to make it 16–3 at halftime. In the third quarter, it was all Colts as they found the end zone twice and were able to take a 17–16 lead: Johnathan Taylor's 2-yard run followed up by a 6-yard pass from Matt Ryan to Michael Pittman Jr. The Steelers responded in the fourth quarter by taking the lead back when Benny Snell ran for a 2-yard touchdown pass (with a successful 2-point conversion) to make the final score 24–17.

With the win, the Steelers improved to 4–7.

==== Week 13: at Atlanta Falcons ====
Week 13: Pittsburgh Steelers at Atlanta Falcons – Game summary

Quarter	1	2	3	4	Total
**Steelers**	3	13	3	0	**19**
Falcons	0	6	7	3	**16**

at Mercedes-Benz Stadium, Atlanta, Georgia

- Date: December 4
- Game time: 1:00 p.m. EST
- Game weather: None (retractable roof closed)
- Game attendance: 70,325
- Referee: Ronald Torbert
- TV announcers (CBS): Andrew Catalon and James Lofton
- Recap, Game Book

Game information

**First quarter**

- PIT – Matthew Wright 46-yard field goal, 7:33. Steelers 3–0. **Drive: 16 plays, 47 yards, 7:27.**

**Second quarter**

- PIT – Matthew Wright 46-yard field goal, 13:34. Steelers 6–0. **Drive: 12 plays, 58 yards, 5:23.**
- ATL – Younghoe Koo 50-yard field goal, 9:15. Steelers 6–3. **Drive: 8 plays, 42 yards, 4:19.**
- PIT – Connor Heyward 17-yard pass from Kenny Pickett (Matthew Wright kick), 7:06. Steelers 13–3. **Drive: 4 plays, 75 yards, 2:09.**
- ATL – Younghoe Koo 51-yard field goal, 5:05. Steelers 13–6. **Drive: 5 plays, 42 yards, 2:01.**
- PIT – Matthew Wright 48-yard field goal, 1:29. Steelers 16–6. **Drive: 9 plays, 45 yards, 3:36.**

**Third quarter**

- PIT – Matthew Wright 33-yard field goal, 4:46. Steelers 19–6. **Drive: 14 plays, 75 yards, 7:36.**
- ATL – MyCole Pruitt 7-yard pass from Marcus Mariota (Younghoe Koo kick), 0:43. Steelers 19–13. **Drive: 8 plays, 75 yards, 4:03.**

**Fourth quarter**

- ATL – Younghoe Koo 28-yard field goal, 5:27. Steelers 19–16. **Drive: 16 plays, 64 yards, 9:21.**

**Top passers**

- PIT – Kenny Pickett – 16/28, 197 yards, TD
- ATL – Marcus Mariota – 13/24, 167 yards, TD, INT

**Top rushers**

- PIT – Najee Harris – 17 rushes, 86 yards
- ATL – Cordarrelle Patterson – 11 rushes, 60 yards

**Top receivers**

- PIT – Pat Freiermuth – 3 receptions, 76 yards
- ATL – Drake London – 6 receptions, 95 yards

After a win on Monday Night Football, the Steelers traveled south to face the Falcons. The Steelers scored the first quarter's only points when Matthew Wright kicked a 46-yard field goal to make it 3–0. They made it 6–0 in the second quarter when Wright kicked another 46-yard field goal. The Falcons got on the board when Younghoe Koo kicked a 51-yard field goal to make it 6–3. The Steelers moved ahead by double digits when Kenny Pickett found Connor Heyward on a 17-yard touchdown pass to make it 13–3. The Falcons came closer when Koo kicked a 51-yard field goal to make it 13–6. The Steelers moved ahead by double digits at halftime when Wright kicked a 48-yard field goal to make it 16–6. After the break, the Steelers went right back to work when Wright kicked a 33-yard field goal to make it 19–6. The Falcons shortened the lead later on in the quarter when Marcus Mariota found MyCole Pruitt on a 7-yard touchdown pass to make it 19–13. In the fourth, they would score the only points when Koo kicked a 28-yard field goal to make it 19–16. Getting the ball back with less than a minute left, the Falcons tried to rally. But Mariota threw the game-losing interception, sealing another Steelers victory.

With the win, the Steelers improved to 5–7.

==== Week 14: vs. Baltimore Ravens ====
Week 14: Baltimore Ravens at Pittsburgh Steelers – Game summary

Quarter	1	2	3	4	Total
**Ravens**	10	3	0	3	**16**
Steelers	7	0	0	7	**14**

at Acrisure Stadium, Pittsburgh, Pennsylvania

- Date: December 11
- Game time: 1:00 p.m. EST
- Game weather: Cloudy, 43 °F (6 °C)
- Game attendance: 66,326
- Referee: Adrian Hill
- TV announcers (CBS): Kevin Harlan, Trent Green and Melanie Collins
- Recap, Game Book

Game information

**First quarter**

- BAL – Justin Tucker 42-yard field goal, 4:46. Ravens 3–0. **Drive: 11 plays, 51 yards, 5:38.**
- BAL – J. K. Dobbins 4-yard run (Justin Tucker kick), 2:31. Ravens 10–0. **Drive: 2 plays, 48 yards, 0:45.**
- PIT – Najee Harris 1-yard run (Chris Boswell kick), 0:13. Ravens 10–7. **Drive: 5 plays, 64 yards, 2:18.**

**Second quarter**

- BAL – Justin Tucker 35-yard field goal, 1:03. Ravens 13–7. **Drive: 10 plays, 54 yards, 4:32.**

**Third quarter**

- No scoring plays.

**Fourth quarter**

- BAL – Justin Tucker 30-yard field goal, 3:19. Ravens 16–7. **Drive: 13 plays, 57 yards, 7:55.**
- PIT – Pat Freiermuth 10-yard pass from Mitchell Trubisky (Chris Boswell kick), 2:30. Ravens 16–14. **Drive: 5 plays, 75 yards, 0:49.**

**Top passers**

- BAL – Tyler Huntley –8/12, 88 yards
- PIT – Mitchell Trubisky – 22/30, 276 yards, TD, 3 INT

**Top rushers**

- BAL – J. K. Dobbins – 15 rushes, 120 yards, TD
- PIT – Najee Harris – 12 rushes, 33 yards, TD

**Top receivers**

- BAL – Demarcus Robinson – 5 receptions, 52 yards
- PIT – Diontae Johnson – 6 receptions, 82 yards

After a tough win on the road, the Steelers returned home for Round 1 against the Ravens. The Ravens struck first in the first quarter and made it 3–0 when Justin Tucker kicked a 42-yard field goal. They made it 10–0 with J.K. Dobbins's 4-yard touchdown run. Though, the Steelers were able to get on the board by way of Najee Harris's 1-yard touchdown run, making it 10–7. In the second quarter, the Ravens were able to make it 13–7 before halftime when Tucker kicked a 35-yard field goal. After a scoreless third quarter, they went back to work in the fourth to increase their lead with Tucker's 30-yard field goal, making it 16–7. The Steelers wrapped up the scoring of the game when Mitchell Trubisky found Pat Freiermuth on a 10-yard touchdown pass to make the final score 16–14.

With their 4-game winning streak against the Ravens snapped, the Steelers fell to 5–8.

==== Week 15: at Carolina Panthers ====
Week 15: Pittsburgh Steelers at Carolina Panthers – Game summary

Quarter	1	2	3	4	Total
**Steelers**	7	7	7	3	**24**
Panthers	0	7	0	9	**16**

at Bank of America Stadium, Charlotte, North Carolina

- Date: December 18
- Game time: 1:00 p.m. EST
- Game weather: Sunny, 46 °F (8 °C)
- Game attendance: 73,548
- Referee: Scott Novak
- TV announcers (CBS): Greg Gumbel, Adam Archuleta and AJ Ross
- Recap, Game Book

Game information

**First quarter**

- PIT – Najee Harris 7-yard run (Chris Boswell kick), 5:48. Steelers 7–0. **Drive: 12 plays, 67 yards, 7:06.**

**Second quarter**

- CAR – D. J. Moore 5-yard pass from Sam Darnold (Eddy Piñeiro kick), 14:12. Tied 7–7. **Drive: 11 plays, 85 yards, 6:36.**
- PIT – Jaylen Warren 2-yard run (Chris Boswell kick), 8:20. Steelers 14–7. **Drive: 10 plays, 75 yards, 5:52.**

**Third quarter**

- PIT – Mitchell Trubisky 1-yard run (Chris Boswell kick), 3:17. Steelers 21–7. **Drive: 21 plays, 91 yards, 11:43.**

**Fourth quarter**

- CAR – Eddy Piñeiro 29-yard field goal, 11:52. Steelers 21–10. **Drive: 11 plays, 64 yards, 6:25.**
- CAR – Eddy Piñeiro 32-yard field goal, 6:15. Steelers 21–13. **Drive: 7 plays, 59 yards, 4:06.**
- PIT – Chris Boswell 50-yard field goal, 1:04. Steelers 24–13. **Drive: 13 plays, 43 yards, 5:11.**
- CAR – Eddy Piñeiro 52-yard field goal, 0:19. Steelers 24–16. **Drive: 5 plays, 29 yards, 0:45.**

**Top passers**

- PIT – Mitchell Trubisky – 17/22, 179 yards
- CAR – Sam Darnold – 14/23, 225 yards, TD

**Top rushers**

- PIT – Najee Harris – 24 rushes, 86 yards, TD
- CAR – Chuba Hubbard – 4 rushes, 10 yards

**Top receivers**

- PIT – Diontae Johnson – 10 receptions, 98 yards
- CAR – D. J. Moore – 5 receptions, 73 yards, TD

After a tough loss at home, the Steelers traveled to take on the Panthers. In the first quarter, the Steelers scored the only points when Najee Harris ran for a 7-yard touchdown. In the second quarter, the Panthers managed to tie it at 7–7 when Sam Darnold found D. J. Moore on a 5-yard pass. The Steelers moved ahead 14–7 by way of Jaylen Warren's to 2-yard touchdown run at halftime. In the third quarter, the Steelers scored the only points when Mitchell Trubisky ran for a touchdown from a yard out to make it 21–7. In the fourth quarter, Eddy Piñeiro got the Panthers within 8 as he nailed field goals from 29 and 32 yards out, making the score 21–13. Though, the Steelers moved ahead by double digits again when Chris Boswell kicked a 50-yard field goal to make it 24–13. The Panthers scored the last points of the game when Piñeiro kicked his last field goal from 52-yards out to make the final score 24–16.

With the win, the Steelers improved to 6–8 and kept their postseason hopes alive.

==== Week 16: vs. Las Vegas Raiders ====
Week 16: Las Vegas Raiders at Pittsburgh Steelers – Game summary

Quarter	1	2	3	4	Total
Raiders	7	3	0	0	**10**
**Steelers**	0	3	0	10	**13**

at Acrisure Stadium, Pittsburgh, Pennsylvania

- Date: December 24
- Game time: 8:15 p.m. EST
- Game weather: Cold, 8 °F (−13 °C)
- Game attendance: 64,761
- Referee: Tra Blake
- TV announcers (KDKA/NFLN): Rich Eisen, Kurt Warner, Steve Mariucci, Michael Irvin, Allison Williams, and Steve Wyche
- Recap, Game Book

Game information

**First quarter**

- LV – Hunter Renfrow 14-yard pass from Derek Carr (Daniel Carlson kick), 6:38. Raiders 7–0. **Drive: 14 plays, 72 yards, 8:22.**

**Second quarter**

- PIT – Chris Boswell 44-yard field goal, 1:49. Raiders 7–3. **Drive: 15 plays, 62 yards, 8:22.**
- LV – Daniel Carlson 40-yard field goal, 0:05. Raiders 10–3. **Drive: 9 plays, 53 yards, 1:44.**

**Third quarter**

- No scoring plays.

**Fourth quarter**

- PIT – Chris Boswell 40-yard field goal, 9:47. Raiders 10–6. **Drive: 9 plays, 33 yards, 5:07.**
- PIT – George Pickens 14-yard pass from Kenny Pickett (Chris Boswell kick), 0:46. Steelers 13–10. **Drive: 10 plays, 76 yards, 2:09.**

**Top passers**

- LV – Derek Carr – 16/30, 174 yards, TD, 3 INT
- PIT – Kenny Pickett – 26/39, 244 yards, TD, INT

**Top rushers**

- LV – Josh Jacobs – 15 rushes, 44 yards
- PIT – Najee Harris – 16 rushes, 53 yards

**Top receivers**

- LV – Darren Waller – 4 receptions, 58 yards
- PIT – Pat Freiermuth – 7 receptions, 66 yards

After a decent road win, the Steelers returned home for another game against the Raiders. In the first quarter, the Raiders scored the only points when Derek Carr found Hunter Renfrow on a 14-yard touchdown pass to make it 7–0. In the second quarter, the Steelers got on the board when Chris Boswell kicked a 44-yard field goal to make it 7–3. The Raiders moved up a touchdown at halftime when Daniel Carlson kicked a 40-yard field goal to make it 10–3. After a scoreless third quarter, the Steelers scored the remaining points in the fourth, taking the lead in the process: Boswell's 40-yard field goal, followed by Kenny Pickett's 14-yard touchdown pass to George Pickens to make the eventual final score 13–10.

With the win, the Steelers improved to 7–8. With the Browns' loss to the Saints earlier in the day, they are now third in the AFC North. The Steelers also beat the Raiders for the first time since 2015 when the Raiders were based in Oakland.

Before the game began, the Steelers paid tribute to celebrate the 50th anniversary of "The Immaculate Reception" which was made by Steeler legend Franco Harris, and retired his jersey number to honor Harris, who had died four days prior to the game.

==== Week 17: at Baltimore Ravens ====
Week 17: Pittsburgh Steelers at Baltimore Ravens – Game summary

Quarter	1	2	3	4	Total
**Steelers**	3	0	3	10	**16**
Ravens	0	10	3	0	**13**

at M&T Bank Stadium, Baltimore, Maryland

- Date: January 1
- Game time: 8:20 p.m. EST
- Game weather: Clear, 50 °F (10 °C)
- Game attendance: 71,042
- Referee: Land Clark
- TV announcers (NBC): Mike Tirico, Cris Collinsworth and Melissa Stark
- Recap, Game Book

Game information

**First quarter**

- PIT – Chris Boswell 21-yard field goal, 7:01. Steelers 3–0. **Drive: 15 plays, 73 yards, 7:59.**

**Second quarter**

- BAL – Justin Tucker 30-yard field goal, 14:09. Tied 3–3. **Drive: 15 plays, 61 yards, 7:52.**
- BAL – Isaiah Likely 7-yard pass from Tyler Huntley (Justin Tucker kick), 0:07. Ravens 10–3. **Drive: 11 plays, 62 yards, 3:23.**

**Third quarter**

- BAL – Justin Tucker 51-yard field goal, 9:31. Ravens 13–3. **Drive: 8 plays, 42 yards, 5:29.**
- PIT – Chris Boswell 51-yard field goal, 3:42. Ravens 13–6. **Drive: 12 plays, 43 yards, 5:49.**

**Fourth quarter**

- PIT – Chris Boswell 33-yard field goal, 9:44. Ravens 13–9. **Drive: 13 plays, 80 yards, 6:02.**
- PIT – Najee Harris 10-yard pass from Kenny Pickett (Chris Boswell kick), 0:56. Steelers 16–13. **Drive: 11 plays, 80 yards, 3:20.**

**Top passers**

- PIT – Kenny Pickett – 15/27, 168 yards, TD
- BAL – Tyler Huntley – 14/21, 130 yards, TD, INT

**Top rushers**

- PIT – Najee Harris – 22 rushes, 111 yards
- BAL – J. K. Dobbins – 17 rushes, 93 yards

**Top receivers**

- PIT – Pat Freiermuth – 3 receptions, 36 yards
- BAL – Mark Andrews – 9 receptions, 100 yards

After a tough win at home, the Steelers headed east for Round 2 against the Ravens. The Steelers scored the only points of the first quarter when Chris Boswell kicked a 21-yard field goal to make it 3-0. However, the Ravens responded in the second quarter, taking a 10-3 lead at halftime by way of Justin Tucker's 30-yard field goal and then Tyler Huntley's 7-yard touchdown pass to Isaiah Likely. The Ravens went right back to work in the second half when Tucker kicked a 51-yard field goal to make it 13-3. The Steelers scored well into the fourth quarter by way of Boswell's 51-yard field goal, later on in the third. In the fourth quarter, they followed up with Boswell kicking a 33-yard field goal and Kenny Pickett found Najee Harris on a 10-yard touchdown pass for the Steelers to make the final score 16-13.

With their third straight win, the Steelers improved to 8-8 and kept their postseason hopes alive. This is also the first career win for Kenny Pickett over an AFC North rival. He once again led a game-winning 4th-quarter drive, becoming the first rookie quarterback in NFL history to do so in two consecutive games.

==== Week 18: vs. Cleveland Browns ====
Week 18: Cleveland Browns at Pittsburgh Steelers – Game summary

Quarter	1	2	3	4	Total
Browns	0	7	0	7	**14**
**Steelers**	0	10	10	8	**28**

at Acrisure Stadium, Pittsburgh, Pennsylvania

- Date: January 8
- Game time: 1:00 p.m. EST
- Game weather: Partly cloudy, 39 °F (4 °C)
- Game attendance: 65,019
- Referee: Clete Blakeman
- TV announcers (CBS): Greg Gumbel, Adam Archuleta and AJ Ross
- Recap, Game Book

Game information

**First quarter**

- No scoring plays.

**Second quarter**

- CLE – David Njoku 10-yard pass from Deshaun Watson (Cade York kick), 6:27. Browns 7–0. **Drive: 10 plays, 71 yards, 4:57.**
- PIT – George Pickens 31-yard pass from Kenny Pickett (Chris Boswell kick), 1:47. Tied 7–7. **Drive: 9 plays, 75 yards, 4:40.**
- PIT – Chris Boswell 49-yard field goal, 0:38. Steelers 10–7. **Drive: 6 plays, 25 yards, 0:33.**

**Third quarter**

- PIT – Chris Boswell 34-yard field goal, 9:04. Steelers 13–7. **Drive: 12 plays, 59 yards, 5:56.**
- PIT – Najee Harris 4-yard run (Chris Boswell kick), 3:12. Steelers 20–7. **Drive: 6 plays, 25 yards, 2:30.**

**Fourth quarter**

- CLE – Nick Chubb 2-yard pass from Deshaun Watson (Cade York kick), 10:11. Steelers 20–14. **Drive: 7 plays, 77 yards, 4:38.**
- PIT – Derek Watt 1-yard run (Kenny Pickett-Diontae Johnson pass), 4:37. Steelers 28–14. **Drive: 14 plays, 75 yards, 5:34.**

**Top passers**

- CLE – Deshaun Watson – 19/29, 230 yards, 2 TD, 2 INT
- PIT – Kenny Pickett – 13/29, 195 yards, TD

**Top rushers**

- CLE – Nick Chubb – 12 rushes, 77 yards
- PIT – Najee Harris – 23 rushes, 84 yards, TD

**Top receivers**

- CLE – Amari Cooper – 2 receptions, 51 yards
- PIT – George Pickens – 3 receptions, 72 yards, TD

After a tough win on the road, the Steelers returned home for their last game of the season, which would be Round 2 against the Browns. After a scoreless first quarter, the Browns struck first when Deshaun Watson found David Njoku on a 10-yard touchdown pass to make it 7-0. The Steelers scored well into the third quarter afterwards. It started in the second when they tied the game at 7-7 when Kenny Pickett found George Pickens on a 31-yard touchdown pass. This would be followed by Chris Boswell kicking a 49-yard field goal to make it 10-7 at halftime. Going back to work in the third, they would score again to make it 20-7 by way of Boswell's 34-yard field goal, followed up by Najee Harris's 4-yard touchdown run. The Browns came closer in the fourth quarter when Watson found Nick Chubb on a 2-yard touchdown pass to make it 20-14. However, the Steelers would score the final 8 points of the game when Derek Watt ran for a 1-yard touchdown (with a successful 2-point conversion) to make the final score 28-14.

With their fourth straight win, the Steelers ended their season 9-8. However, they were eliminated from postseason contention with the Jets' loss to the Dolphins.

=== Standings ===
==== Division ====
AFC North
	W	L	T	PCT	DIV	CONF	PF	PA	STK
^{(3)} Cincinnati Bengals	12	4	0	.750	3–3	8–3	418	322	W8
^{(6)} Baltimore Ravens	10	7	0	.588	3–3	6–6	350	315	L2
Pittsburgh Steelers	9	8	0	.529	3–3	5–7	308	346	W4
Cleveland Browns	7	10	0	.412	3–3	4–8	361	381	L1

==== Conference ====
AFC
#	Team	Division	W	L	T	PCT	DIV	CONF	SOS	SOV	STK
**Division leaders**
1	Kansas City Chiefs	West	14	3	0	.824	6–0	9–3	.453	.422	W5
2	Buffalo Bills	East	13	3	0	.813	4–2	9–2	.489	.471	W7
3	Cincinnati Bengals	North	12	4	0	.750	3–3	8–3	.507	.490	W8
4	Jacksonville Jaguars	South	9	8	0	.529	4–2	8–4	.467	.438	W5
**Wild cards**
5 (Note: LA Chargers claimed the No. 5 seed over Baltimore based on conference record (7–5 vs. 6–6).)	Los Angeles Chargers	West	10	7	0	.588	2–4	7–5	.443	.341	L1
6	Baltimore Ravens	North	10	7	0	.588	3–3	6–6	.509	.456	L2
7 (Note: Miami finished ahead of Pittsburgh based on head-to-head victory, claiming the 7th and final playoff spot.)	Miami Dolphins	East	9	8	0	.529	3–3	7–5	.537	.457	W1
**Did not qualify for the postseason**
8	Pittsburgh Steelers	North	9	8	0	.529	3–3	5–7	.519	.451	W4
9	New England Patriots	East	8	9	0	.471	3–3	6–6	.502	.415	L1
10 (Note: NY Jets and Tennessee finished ahead of Cleveland based on conference record (5–7 vs. 4–8).) (Note: NY Jets finished ahead of Tennessee based on common record (3–3 vs. 2–4 against: Buffalo, Cincinnati, Denver, Green Bay, Jacksonville).)	New York Jets	East	7	10	0	.412	2–4	5–7	.538	.458	L6
11	Tennessee Titans	South	7	10	0	.412	3–3	5–7	.509	.336	L7
12	Cleveland Browns	North	7	10	0	.412	3–3	4–8	.524	.492	L1
13	Las Vegas Raiders	West	6	11	0	.353	3–3	5–7	.474	.397	L3
14	Denver Broncos	West	5	12	0	.294	1–5	3–9	.481	.465	W1
15	Indianapolis Colts	South	4	12	1	.265	1–4–1	4–7–1	.512	.500	L7
16	Houston Texans	South	3	13	1	.206	3–2–1	3–8–1	.481	.402	W1
**Tiebreakers** (Note: When breaking ties for three or more teams under the NFL's rules, they are first broken within divisions, then comparing only the highest ranked remaining team from each division.)
