= List of Houston Cougars in the NFL draft =

This is a list of Houston Cougars football players in the NFL draft.

== Key ==
B	Back	K	Kicker	NT	Nose tackle
C	Center	LB	Linebacker	FB	Fullback
DB	Defensive back	P	Punter	HB	Halfback
DE	Defensive end	QB	Quarterback	WR	Wide receiver
DT	Defensive tackle	RB	Running back	G	Guard
E	End	T	Offensive tackle	TE	Tight end

== Selections ==
Year	Round	Pick	Overall	Player	Team	Position
1951	8	12	98	Max Clark	Cleveland Browns	B
1952	3	2	27	Gene Shannon	San Francisco 49ers	B
1952	11	8	129	J. D. Kimmel	San Francisco 49ers	DT
1952	17	7	200	John Carroll	Chicago Bears	T
1953	7	9	82	Paul Carr	San Francisco 49ers	B
1953	14	11	168	Frank James	Los Angeles Rams	G
1953	25	4	293	Vic Hampel	Pittsburgh Steelers	E
1953	27	6	319	Jim McConaughey	Green Bay Packers	E
1954	2	9	22	Buddy Gillioz	Los Angeles Rams	T
1954	16	12	193	Bob Chuoke	Detroit Lions	T
1954	17	9	202	Ed Wilhelm	Los Angeles Rams	C
1954	20	8	237	Tommy Bailes	Philadelphia Eagles	B
1954	27	3	316	Bobby Clatterbuck	New York Giants	B
1954	30	10	359	Don Folks	San Francisco 49ers	E
1955	21	4	245	Lavell Isbell	Green Bay Packers	T
1956	7	10	83	Donnie Caraway	Washington Redskins	B
1956	10	4	113	Tom Dimmick	Philadelphia Eagles	C
1956	17	1	194	Ken Wind	Detroit Lions	E
1957	7	4	77	Curley Johnson	Pittsburgh Steelers	B
1957	12	6	139	Rudy Spitzenberger	Cleveland Browns	G
1957	15	7	176	Earl Kaiser	San Francisco 49ers	B
1957	17	3	196	Don Boudreaux	Green Bay Packers	T
1957	17	9	202	Buddy Terry	Chicago Cardinals	T
1957	21	4	245	Owen Mulholland	Baltimore Colts	B
1957	23	2	267	Dalva Allen	Los Angeles Rams	T
1957	28	10	335	Joe Smith	Detroit Lions	B
1957	29	11	348	Donnie Caraway	Chicago Bears	B
1958	4	10	47	Donnie Caraway	New York Giants	B
1958	11	10	131	Hogan Wharton	San Francisco 49ers	T
1958	29	3	340	Don McDonald	Philadelphia Eagles	B
1958	30	1	350	John Peters	Green Bay Packers	T
1959	2	8	20	Don Brown	Los Angeles Rams	B
1959	7	12	84	Hal Lewis	Baltimore Colts	B
1959	9	7	103	Hal Davis	Pittsburgh Steelers	G
1959	15	8	176	Walt Kelly	Los Angeles Rams	B
1959	23	12	276	Bob Davis	Baltimore Colts	B
1959	25	8	296	Bob Borah	Los Angeles Rams	E
1960	8	11	95	Jim Colvin	Baltimore Colts	T
1960	18	8	212	Claude King	Chicago Bears	B
1961	10	9	135	Errol Linden	Detroit Lions	E
1962	5	10	66	Dan Birdwell	Detroit Lions	C
1962	8	10	108	Murdock Hopper	Detroit Lions	T
1962	10	2	128	Jim Norris	Los Angeles Rams	T
1962	15	3	199	Walter Nikirk	Los Angeles Rams	T
1963	20	14	280	Bobby Brezina	Green Bay Packers	B
1967	2	1	27	Bo Burris	New Orleans Saints	DB
1967	2	6	32	Tom Beer	Denver Broncos	TE
1967	4	5	85	Carl Cunningham	Denver Broncos	DE
1967	4	14	94	Dickie Post	San Diego Chargers	RB
1967	9	9	220	Paul Otis	Pittsburgh Steelers	DT
1967	12	18	308	Charles Fowler	Cleveland Browns	T
1967	13	6	321	Dennis Furjanic	Denver Broncos	DB
1968	3	24	79	Ken Hebert	Pittsburgh Steelers	WR
1968	4	26	109	Warren McVea	Cincinnati Bengals	RB
1968	4	28	111	Gus Hollomon	Denver Broncos	DB
1968	9	21	240	Tom Paciorek	Miami Dolphins	DB
1968	11	2	275	Greg Brezina	Atlanta Falcons	LB
1968	11	23	296	Bill Pickens	Baltimore Colts	G
1968	14	22	376	Rich Stotter	Houston Oilers	G
1968	15	2	383	Don Bean	Atlanta Falcons	WR
1968	17	19	454	George Nordgren	Dallas Cowboys	RB
1969	2	3	29	Paul Gipson	Atlanta Falcons	RB
1969	5	14	118	Johnny Peacock	Houston Oilers	DB
1969	7	5	161	Royce Berry	Cincinnati Bengals	DE
1969	7	26	182	Cliff Larson	New York Jets	DE
1969	13	13	330	Mike Simpson	San Diego Chargers	DB
1969	16	8	398	Ken Spain	Detroit Lions	DE
1970	6	9	139	Rusty Clark	San Francisco 49ers	QB
1970	7	9	165	Jim Strong	San Francisco 49ers	RB
1970	9	5	213	Bill Bridges	Buffalo Bills	G
1971	1	16	16	Elmo Wright	Kansas City Chiefs	WR
1971	2	10	36	Charlie Ford	Chicago Bears	DB
1971	3	16	68	Charlie Hall	Cleveland Browns	LB
1971	4	4	82	Carlos Bell	New Orleans Saints	RB
1971	6	5	135	Earl Thomas	Chicago Bears	TE
1971	10	11	245	Larry Rowden	Chicago Bears	LB
1971	13	24	336	Benny Fry	Minnesota Vikings	C
1971	15	17	381	Ted Heiskell	St. Louis Cardinals	RB
1971	16	2	392	Craig Robinson	New Orleans Saints	T
1971	16	26	416	Rich Harrington	Baltimore Colts	DB
1972	1	5	5	Riley Odoms	Denver Broncos	TE
1972	2	9	35	Robert Newhouse	Dallas Cowboys	RB
1972	3	17	69	Tom Mozisek	New York Giants	RB
1972	9	8	216	Kent Branstetter	New Orleans Saints	DT
1972	13	6	318	Willie Roberts	Houston Oilers	DB
1974	3	8	60	Steve George	St. Louis Cardinals	DT
1975	1	5	5	Mack Mitchell	Cleveland Browns	DE
1975	3	23	75	Gerald Hill	Miami Dolphins	LB
1975	4	1	79	Robert Giblin	New York Giants	DB
1975	4	2	80	Marshall Johnson	Baltimore Colts	RB
1975	4	26	104	Harold Evans	Pittsburgh Steelers	LB
1975	6	25	155	Bubba Broussard	Minnesota Vikings	LB
1975	7	18	174	Reggie Cherry	Buffalo Bills	RB
1975	9	6	214	Larry Keller	San Diego Chargers	LB
1975	16	25	415	Miller Bassler	Pittsburgh Steelers	TE
1976	4	32	124	Everett Little	Tampa Bay Buccaneers	G
1976	13	15	362	Donnie McGraw	Denver Broncos	DB
1977	1	8	8	Wilson Whitley	Cincinnati Bengals	DT
1977	3	25	81	Val Belcher	Dallas Cowboys	G
1977	4	24	108	Guy Brown	Dallas Cowboys	LB
1977	8	10	205	Eddie Foster	Houston Oilers	WR
1978	3	27	83	Don Bass	Cincinnati Bengals	WR
1978	4	26	110	Alois Blackwell	Dallas Cowboys	RB
1979	1	20	20	Willis Adams	Cleveland Browns	WR
1979	7	14	179	Emmett King	New York Jets	RB
1979	8	24	216	Randy Love	New England Patriots	RB
1979	10	25	273	Grady Ebensberger	Los Angeles Rams	DT
1980	4	15	98	David Hodge	San Francisco 49ers	LB
1980	7	22	187	Melvin Jones	Washington Redskins	G
1980	11	5	282	Delrick Brown	St. Louis Cardinals	DB
1981	1	27	27	Leonard Mitchell	Philadelphia Eagles	DE
1981	8	27	220	Hosea Taylor	Baltimore Colts	DT
1982	4	20	103	David Barrett	Tampa Bay Buccaneers	RB
1982	6	24	163	Lonell Phea	New York Jets	WR
1982	7	22	189	Alvin Ruben	Denver Broncos	DE
1983	5	4	116	Weedy Harris	Denver Broncos	LB
1983	8	11	207	James Durham	Buffalo Bills	DB
1983	11	15	294	Calvin Eason	New England Patriots	DB
1984	6	12	152	Eugene Lockhart	Dallas Cowboys	LB
1984	11	21	301	Dwayne Love	Los Angeles Rams	RB
1984	12	7	315	David Robertson	New York Jets	WR
1984	12	22	330	Donald Jordan	Chicago Bears	RB
1984	12	26	334	Carl Lewis	Dallas Cowboys	WR
1985	2	26	54	Simon Fletcher	Denver Broncos	DE
1985	3	28	84	Audray McMillian	New England Patriots	DB
1985	12	23	331	Bryant Winn	Washington Redskins	LB
1986	3	26	81	T. J. Turner	Miami Dolphins	DT
1986	7	13	179	Carl Hilton	Minnesota Vikings	TE
1986	12	25	330	Larry Shepherd	Los Angeles Raiders	WR
1989	5	10	122	Johnnie Jackson	San Francisco 49ers	DB
1989	5	19	131	Glenn Montgomery	Houston Oilers	DT
1989	10	2	253	Jason Phillips	Detroit Lions	WR
1990	1	7	7	Andre Ware	Detroit Lions	QB
1990	1	15	15	Lamar Lathon	Houston Oilers	LB
1990	2	27	52	Alton Montgomery	Denver Broncos	DB
1990	3	13	66	Alfred Oglesby	Miami Dolphins	DT
1990	3	28	81	Craig Veasey	Pittsburgh Steelers	DT
1990	11	2	278	Chris Ellison	Atlanta Falcons	DB
1990	11	19	295	Joey Banes	Houston Oilers	T
1991	7	9	176	Reggie Burnette	Green Bay Packers	LB
1991	9	19	242	Chuck Weatherspoon	Philadelphia Eagles	RB
1992	1	6	6	David Klingler	Cincinnati Bengals	QB
1992	6	14	154	Glenn Cadrez	New York Jets	LB
1992	7	24	192	John Brown	Chicago Bears	WR
1992	9	2	226	Ostell Miles	Cincinnati Bengals	RB
1992	11	23	303	Mike Gisler	New Orleans Saints	G
1994	2	22	51	Allen Aldridge	Denver Broncos	LB
1994	3	8	73	Lamar Smith	Seattle Seahawks	RB
1994	6	13	174	Ryan McCoy	Philadelphia Eagles	LB
1995	1	25	25	Billy Milner	Miami Dolphins	T
1996	2	21	51	Dedric Mathis	Indianapolis Colts	DB
1996	5	14	146	Jimmy Herndon	Jacksonville Jaguars	G
1997	1	23	23	Antowain Smith	Buffalo Bills	RB
1997	4	21	117	Delmonico Montgomery	Indianapolis Colts	DB
1997	6	22	185	Marcus Spriggs	Buffalo Bills	G
1997	6	28	191	Chuck Clements	New York Jets	QB
1998	4	23	115	Leonta Rheams	New England Patriots	DT
1998	7	24	213	Ben Fricke	New York Giants	C
2000	7	7	213	Mike Green	Tennessee Titans	RB
2003	6	15	188	Hanik Milligan	San Diego Chargers	DB
2004	6	9	174	Rex Hadnot	Miami Dolphins	C
2005	2	6	38	Stanford Routt	Oakland Raiders	DB
2007	2	4	36	Kevin Kolb	Philadelphia Eagles	QB
2008	2	2	33	Donnie Avery	St. Louis Rams	WR
2009	2	26	58	Sebastian Vollmer	New England Patriots	T
2010	6	1	170	Fendi Onobun	St. Louis Rams	TE
2013	1	12	12	D. J. Hayden	Oakland Raiders	DB
2016	1	24	24	William Jackson III	Cincinnati Bengals	DB
2016	6	39	214	Elandon Roberts	New England Patriots	LB
2016	7	8	229	Demarcus Ayers	Pittsburgh Steelers	WR
2017	2	15	47	Tyus Bowser	Baltimore Ravens	LB
2017	4	19	126	Howard Wilson	Cleveland Browns	DB
2017	6	23	207	Brandon Wilson	Cincinnati Bengals	DB
2018	7	3	221	Matthew Adams	Indianapolis Colts	LB
2019	1	9	9	Ed Oliver	Buffalo Bills	DT
2019	4	27	129	Isaiah Johnson	Oakland Raiders	DB
2019	6	27	200	Emeke Egbule	Los Angeles Chargers	LB
2020	3	8	72	Josh Jones	Arizona Cardinals	T
2021	1	28	28	Payton Turner	New Orleans Saints	DE
2021	6	19	203	Marquez Stevenson	Buffalo Bills	WR
2021	7	31	259	Grant Stuard	Tampa Bay Buccaneers	LB
2022	2	1	33	Logan Hall	Tampa Bay Buccaneers	DT
2022	3	21	85	Marcus Jones	New England Patriots	DB
2022	4	36	141	Damarion Williams	Baltimore Ravens	DB
2023	3	6	69	Nathaniel Dell	Houston Texans	WR
2023	5	4	139	Clayton Tune	Arizona Cardinals	QB
2023	7	23	240	Derek Parish	Jacksonville Jaguars	FB
2023	7	37	254	Gervarrius Owens	New York Giants	DB
2024	2	23	55	Patrick Paul	Miami Dolphins	T
2026	5	24	164	Tanner Koziol	Jacksonville Jaguars	TE

== Notable undrafted players ==
Note: No drafts held before 1936

Debut year	Player name	Position	Debut NFL/AFL team	Notes
1960	Don Flynn	DB	Dallas Texans	—
1961	Wiley Feagin	G	Baltimore Colts	—
1961	Don Mullins	DB	Chicago Bears	—
1961	Pat Studstill	WR	Detroit Lions	—
1962	Charles Brown	T	Oakland Raiders	—
1962	Charlie Rieves	LB	Oakland Raiders	—
1974	Hal Roberts	P	St. Louis Cardinals	—
1979	Chuck Brown	G/C	St. Louis Cardinals	—
1981	Daryl Wilkerson	DE	Baltimore Colts	—
1983	Billy Kidd	C	Houston Oilers	—
1985	Mike Clendenen	K	Houston Oilers	—
1986	Earl Allen	CB	Atlanta Falcons	—
1990	Kimble Anders	FB	Pittsburgh Steelers	—
1990	Ed Thomas	TE	Tampa Bay Buccaneers	—
1997	Gerome Williams	S	San Diego Chargers	—
1997	Jermaine Williams	RB	Tampa Bay Buccaneers	—
1998	Antoine Simpson	DT	Miami Dolphins	—
1999	Wilbert Brown	G	San Diego Chargers	—
2001	Josh Lovelady	G	Detroit Lions	—
2003	Joffrey Reynolds	RB	St. Louis Rams	—
2004	Brandon Middleton	WR	Detroit Lions	—
2006	Thomas Gafford	LS	Green Bay Packers	—
2007	Jackie Battle	RB	Dallas Cowboys	—
2007	Biren Ealy	WR	Tennessee Titans	—
2007	Willie Gaston	DB	Baltimore Ravens	—
2009	Phillip Hunt	LB	Cleveland Browns	—
2012	Sammy Brown	LB	St. Louis Rams	—
2012	Patrick Edwards	WR	Detroit Lions	—
2012	Case Keenum	QB	Houston Texans	—
2015	Derrick Mathews	LB	Washington Redskins	—
2015	Joey Mbu	DT	Atlanta Falcons	—
2016	Kenneth Farrow	RB	San Diego Chargers	—
2016	Nolan Frese	LS	Seattle Seahawks	—
2017	Cameron Malveaux	DE	Miami Dolphins	—
2017	Greg Ward	WR	Philadelphia Eagles	—
2018	Kyle Allen	QB	Carolina Panthers	—
2018	Steven Dunbar	WR	San Francisco 49ers	—
2018	D'Juan Hines	LB	Los Angeles Chargers	—
2018	Nick Thurman	DT	Houston Texans	—
2019	Alexander Myres	DB	Pittsburgh Steelers	—
2023	Art Green	CB	Denver Broncos	—
2025	Ajani Carter	CB	Kansas City Chiefs	—
2025	Keith Cooper Jr.	DE	Detroit Lions	—
2026	Dean Connors	RB	Los Angeles Rams	—
2026	Latrell McCutchin Sr.	CB	Tennessee Titans	—
2026	Zelmar Vedder	CB	Kansas City Chiefs	—
