= Conerly =

Conerly is a surname. Notable people with the surname include:

- Charlie Conerly (1921–1996), American football player
  - Conerly Trophy, an award given annually by the Mississippi Sports Hall of Fame
- Josh Conerly Jr. (born 2003), American football player
- Matt Conerly (born 1967), American football player
