= Gerald Hill =

Gerald Hill may refer to:

- Gerald Hill (cricketer), (1913–2006), English cricketer
- Gerald Hill (politician) (1919–1997)
- Gerald Hill (American football) on List of Houston Cougars in the NFL draft
- Gerald Hill (attorney) in California Democratic Council

== See also ==
- Gerald Hills (active from 1990), American politician and educator
- Jerry Hill (disambiguation)
- Gerald Rowland Clegg-Hill, 7th Viscount Hill (1904–1974), British peer
- Hill (surname)
