= North Shore Senior High School (Texas) =

Public high school in Harris County, Texas, United States

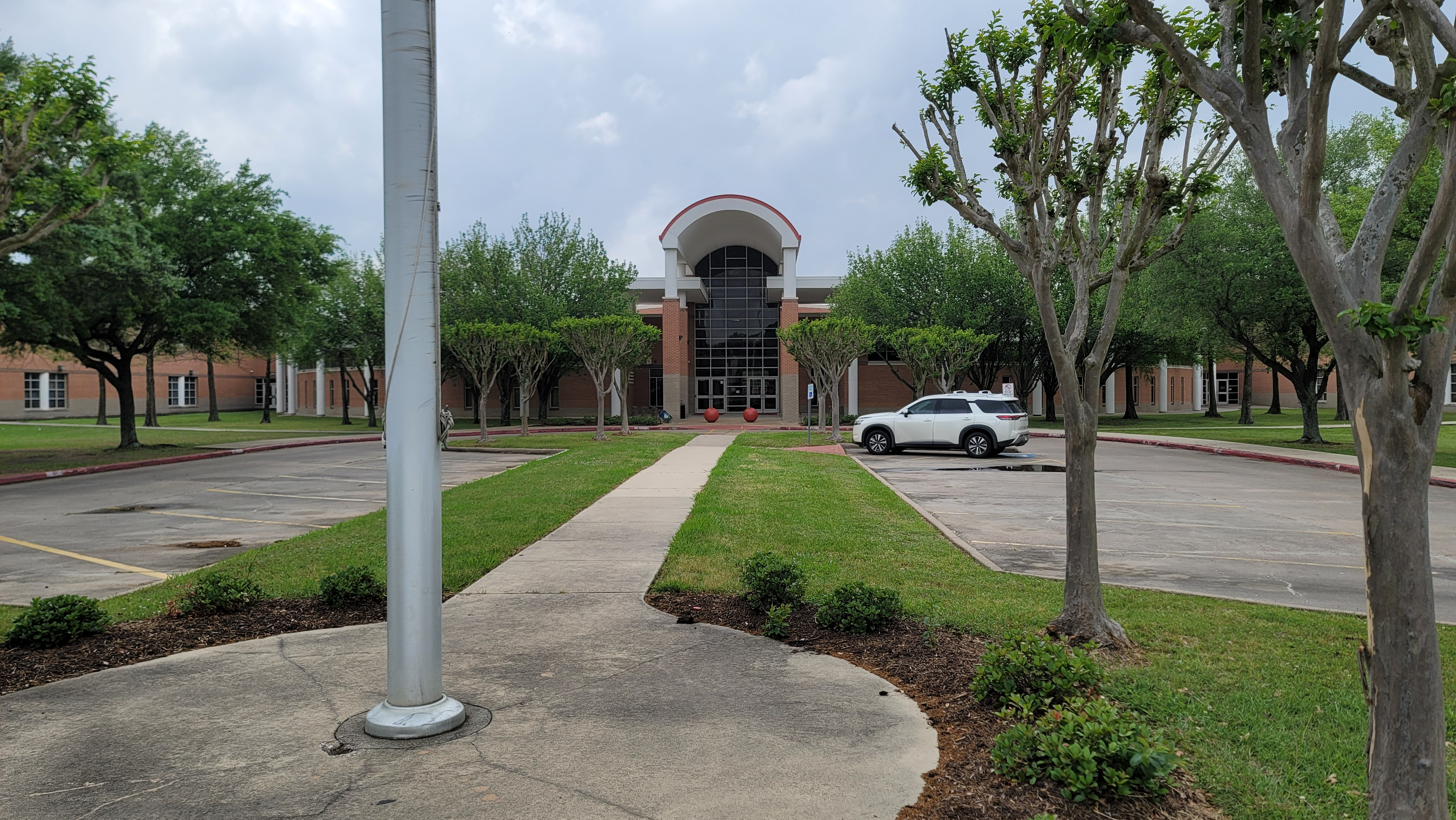
- Main entrance to North Shore High School

Location
- Senior High and 10th Grade: 353 Castlegory Drive, Houston, Texas 77049; 9th Grade: 13501 Holly Park Houston, TX 77015; United States; 29.8092003°N 95.1772661°W

Information
- Type: Public Secondary
- Established: 1962
- School district: Galena Park Independent School District
- Superintendent: Dr. John Moore
- Principal: David Pierson
- Teaching staff: 280.11 (FTE)
- Grades: 9–12
- Enrollment: 4,534 (2023–2024)
- Student to teacher ratio: 16.19
- Colors: Scarlet; White
- Song: North Shore Senior High School Alma Mater
- Athletics conference: UIL Class 6A
- Mascot: Mustangs "Thunder"
- Feeder schools: Cunningham Middle School North Shore Middle School
- Sports District: 21-6A (Region 3)
- Campuses: 2
- Website: Official Website

North Shore Senior High School is a secondary school located in unincorporated Harris County, Texas, United States in Greater Houston. The school includes grades 9 through 12 on three campuses, and is part of the Galena Park Independent School District (GPISD).

In 2022, the school was given an Overall Accountability Rating of 'B' (88) by the Texas Education Agency, with distinctions earned for Mathematics, Science, Social Studies, Comparative Academic Growth, Postsecondary Readiness, and Comparative Closing the Gaps.

The 9th Grade Campus/old campus is in the Cloverleaf CDP.

== History ==
Campuses in Harris County

North Shore opened in fall 1962 with grades 10–11 at a time when 9th grade students were typically located at junior high schools in Texas. In May 1965, the school graduated its first class of seniors that had spent all three years at North Shore. In 1999, a new larger campus was opened approximately 1.5 miles (2.4 km) north of the original. The original campus retained grades 9 and 10, and grades 11 and 12 moved to the new campus. In 2008 grade 10 was moved to the newer campus, and the original location became the North Shore 9th Grade Center. In 2018, the school separated the 10th grade students into the then new North Shore 10th Grade Center.

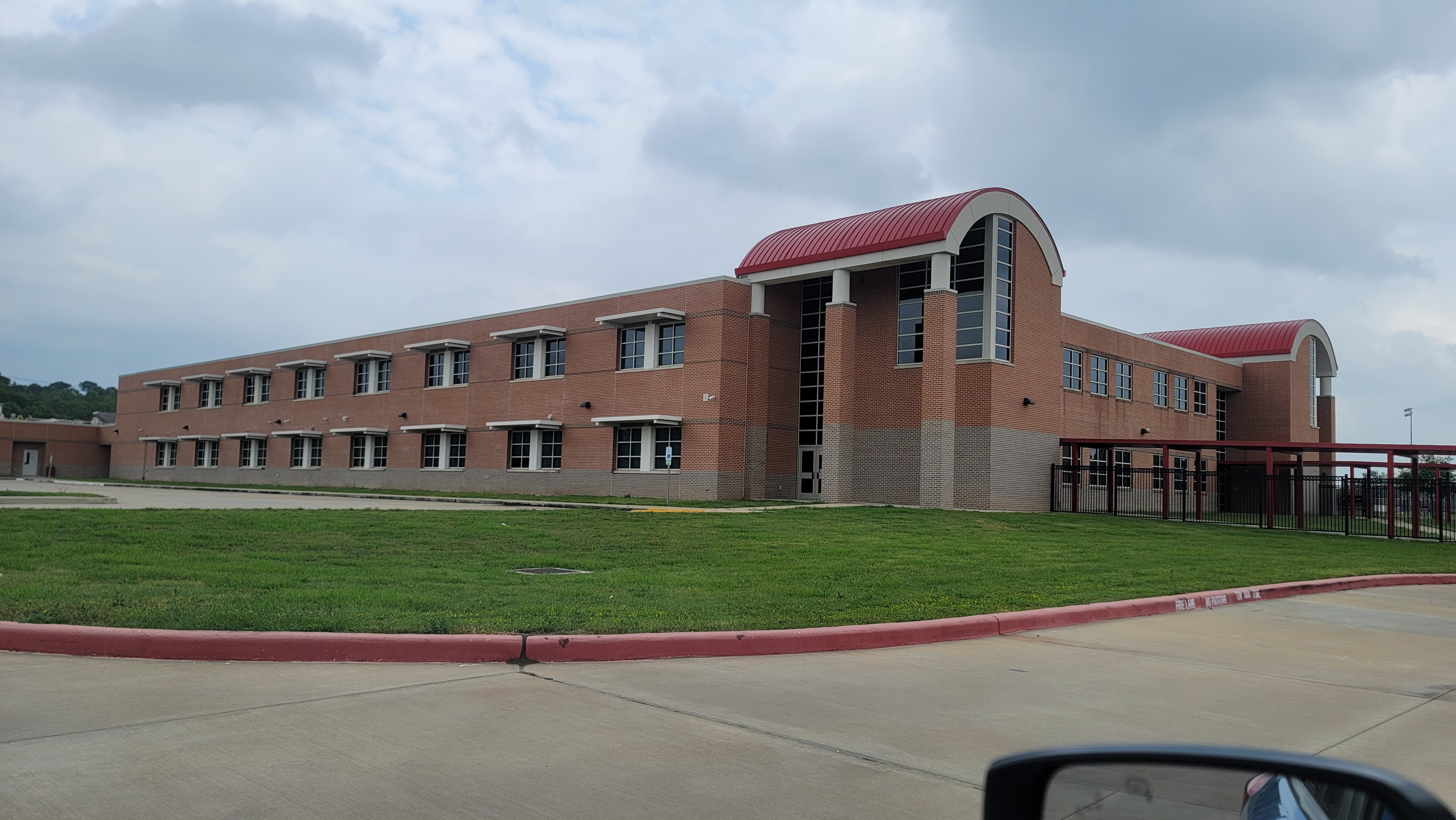
North Shore 10th Grade Center

As of 2019 the two campuses combined had 4,775 students, making it the largest high school by student population in Greater Houston as well as the largest in the Texas Education Agency (TEA) Education Service Center Region 4.

== Athletics ==
North Shore's sports teams are the Mustangs, and they compete in the following UIL sports:

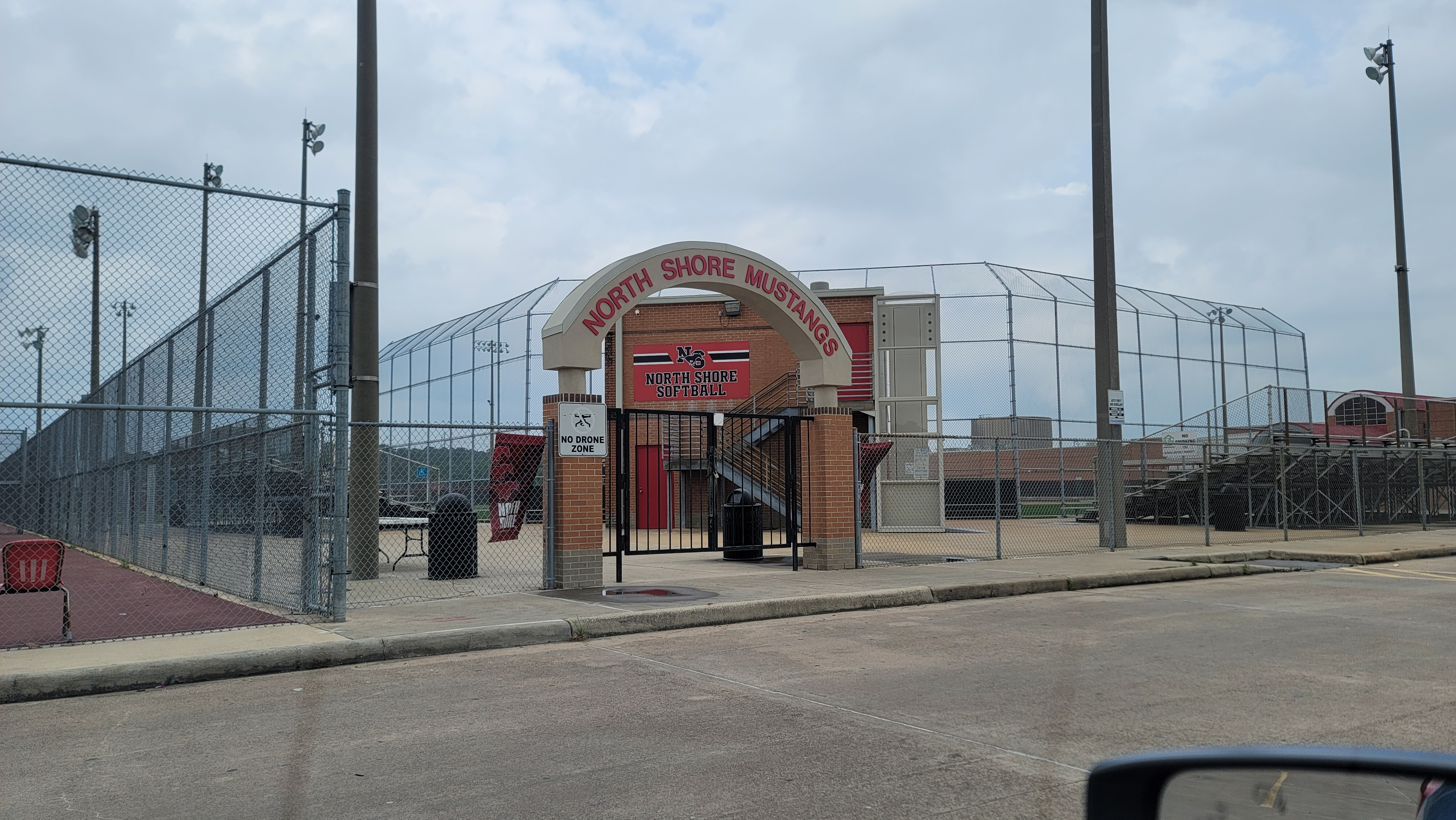
Entryway to softball field

Boys Teams

- Baseball
- Basketball
  - 1990–91 Class 5A State Final Four
  - 1996–97 Class 5A State Runner-Up
  - 2013–14 Class 5A State Champion
  - 2018–19 Class 6A State Final Four
- Cross Country
- Football
  - 1996 Class 5A D1 State Final Four
  - 2003 Class 5A D1 State Champion
  - 2007 Class 5A D1 State Final Four
  - 2012 Class 5A D1 State Quarter Finals
  - 2015 Class 6A D1 State Champion
  - 2016 Class 6A D1 State Quarter Finals
  - 2017 Class 6A D1 State Quarter Finals
  - 2018 Class 6A D1 State Champion
  - 2019 Class 6A D1 State Champion
  - 2020 Class 6A D1 State Final Four
  - 2021 Class 6A D1 State Champion
  - 2022 Class 6A D1 State Runner-Up
  - 2023 Class 6A D1 State Runner-Up
  - 2024 Class 6A D1 State Final Four
  - 2025 Class 6A D1 State Champion
- Golf
- Soccer
- Swimming & Diving
- Tennis
- Track & Field
  - 2008–09 Class 5A State Runner Up
  - 2009–10 Class 5A State Champion
  - 2010–11 Class 5A State Champion
- Water Polo

Girls Teams

- Basketball
  - 2015–16 Class 6A State Final Four
- Cross Country
- Golf
- Soccer
- Softball
- Swimming & Diving
- Tennis
- Track & Field
- Volleyball
- Water Polo

== Fine Arts ==
North Shore Senior High School has several fine arts programs such as band and percussion, choir, theater, dance, cheer, drill team (Scarlets), Colorguard, and art

Band

The North Shore Senior High School Marching Band enrolls over 300 ninth through twelfth grade students every year and is one of the largest organizations on campus. The band has received 40 consecutive UIL Sweepstakes awards, many Best in Class recognitions, and has advanced to the UIL State Marching Band Contest nine times. In 2016, the band was a State Finalist and UIL Area F Champion. In the spring, students perform in one of the five concert bands: Cadet Band, Concert Band, Philharmonic Band, Symphonic Band, and the Wind Ensemble. The North Shore concert bands have all consistently earned sweepstakes awards at the UIL Concert and Sight Reading events. In addition to their involvement in the concert bands, each student must participate in the Texas Music Educators Association's Region, Area, and All-State band and orchestra performances and the GPISD Solo & Ensemble Contest.

In 2017, the North Shore Senior High School Wind Ensemble was invited to perform at The Midwest International Band and Orchestra Conference in Chicago, Illinois.

In 2024, the North Shore Senior High School Wind Ensemble was invited to hold a clinic at the Texas Bandmasters Association Convention in San Antonio, Texas.

Since 1985, 46 students have made a TMEA All-State Band or Orchestra.

Choir

The choral department is a socially active, ethnically diverse group on a 6A campus in a small community outside of Houston, TX. The choir department consists of 12 performing groups that meet over 10 periods and 2 days of afterschool rehearsals. The competing ensembles consistently receive Superior Ratings at the UIL Concert and Sight Reading Evaluation. The Show Choir, Perfect Harmony, regularly tours the Houston Area. In the fall students will audition in the Texas Music Educators Association all-state audition process. The choir also holds a Pop Show, separate from the competition music.

In 2024, the Varsity Mixed Chorale received the award for Performance of Distinction at the Celebration of Excellence in Houston, Texas.

In 2019, the Varsity Tenor Bass Choir performed at the 2019 TMEA Convention in San Antonio, Texas.

Since 1991, 50 students have made a TMEA All State Choir.

Colorguard

The North Shore Colorguard performs with the Marching Band in the fall and does an ensemble in the winter and spring. The Winter Guard is under the direction of Mr. Bucky Flores. The Guard is a consistent top finisher at Texas Color Guard Circuit events and is the 2015 and 2023 TCGC Scholastic silver medalist. They also perform in the GPISD Solo and Ensemble contest at the end of the school year.

Percussion

In addition to being a part of concert ensembles, percussion students are also in the Indoor Drumline. The North Shore Senior High School Drumline is under the direction of Justin Cooperman. The ensemble is a two-time Winter Guard International Scholastic World finalist and seven-time Texas Color Guard Circuit Scholastic World state champion.

Theater

The theater department is a member of International Thespian Society as Troupe 1639. They put on a musical and play in the fall, and compete in U.I.L One Act Play, where students consistently win best actor, lights, stage management, or sound nominations all the way up to the Regional level of competition.

== Notable alumni ==
- Dorance Armstrong Jr. — Professional football player in the NFL.
- Shad Banks Jr. — American football linebacker for the Tennessee Titans
- Brian Bohanon — Former professional baseball pitcher in MLB.
- Tiffany Bolton — Actress, model, and television personality.
- Chykie Brown — Former professional football player in the NFL.
- John Bundrick — Musician and keyboardist for The Who.
- K'Lavon Chaisson — Professional football player in the NFL.
- Matt Conerly — Former professional football player in the NFL, Arena Football and the Norwegian American Football Federation.
- Devante Davis — Former professional football player in the NFL.
- Emeke Egbule — Professional football player in the NFL.
- Zach Evans — Former American football running back for the Los Angeles Rams.
- Willie Gaston — Former professional football player in the NFL.
- Lance Gunn — Former professional football player in the NFL and NFL Europe.
- Andre Gurode — Former professional football player in the NFL.
- Denver Harris — College football player for the UNLV Rebels
- Trey Hopkins — Former professional football player in the NFL.
- Raúl Márquez — Former U.S. Olympic and professional boxer.
- Earl Mitchell — Former professional football player in the NFL.
- Garrett Mock — Former professional baseball pitcher in MLB.
- Johnathan Motley — basketball player for Hapoel Tel Aviv of the Israeli Basketball Premier League
- Jamal Perry — NFL player for the Miami Dolphins
- Lexi Randall — Former child actor in films and television.
- Kirk Jerel Randle — Better known by his stage name Kirko Bangz. Rapper, singer, songwriter and record producer.
- Cory Redding — Former professional football player in the NFL.
- Bobby Reid — Former professional football quarterback.
- Jaeden Roberts — American football offensive guard for the Philadelphia Eagles
- Kevin Rutland — Former professional football player in the NFL and CFL.
- Devin Sanchez — football player
- Joe Stephens — Former professional basketball player in the NBA. Currently a Harris County Justice of the Peace.
- Upton Stout —Professional football player for the San Francisco 49ers.
- Alex Tillman — Former professional football defensive back and punt returner.
- Najee Toran — Former professional football player in the NFL.
- DeAndrew White — Former professional football player in the NFL.
