= Carlins Platel =

American football player (born 1999)

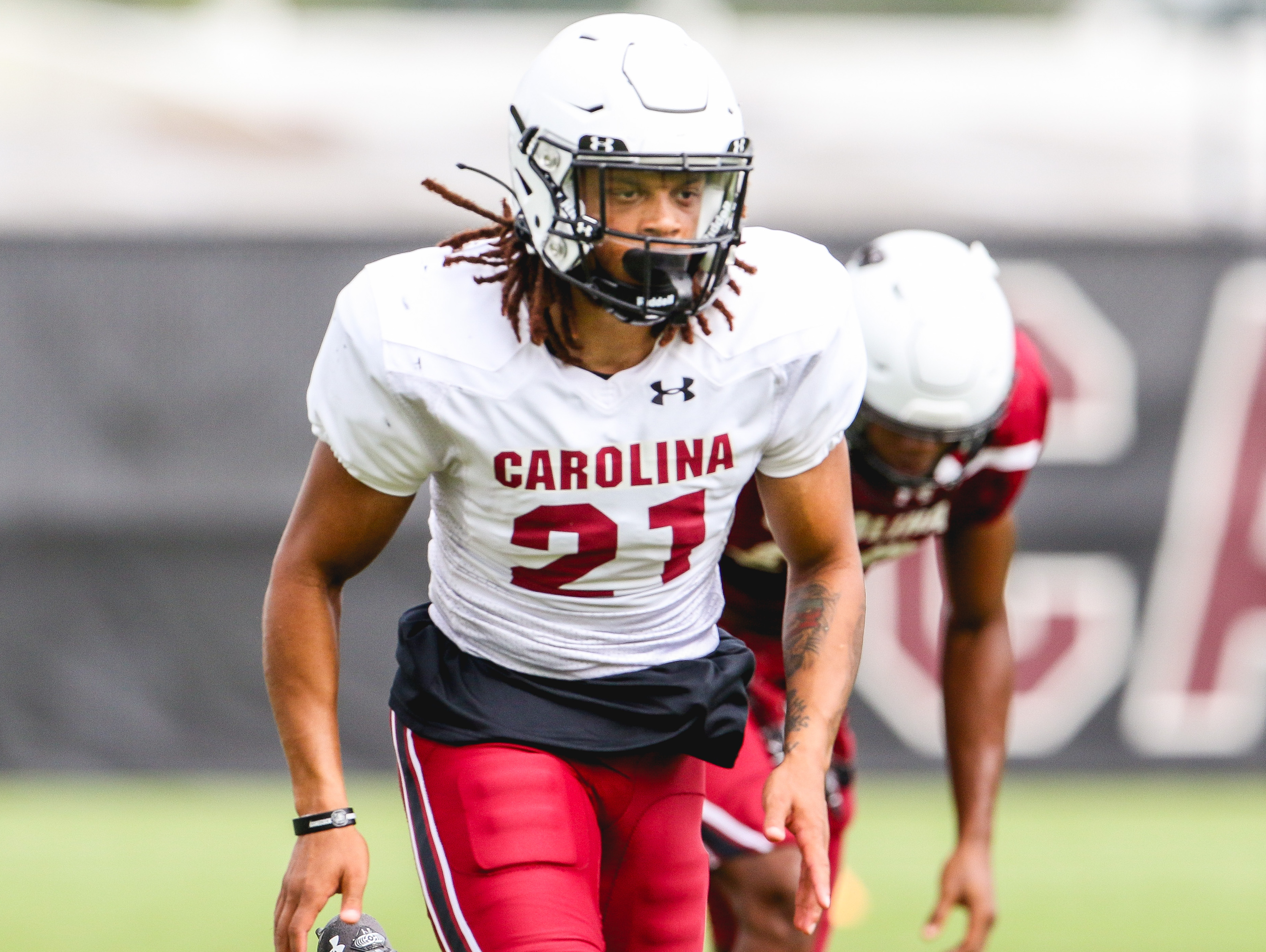
- Platel with the South Carolina Gamecocks in 2021

No. 21
- Position: Cornerback

Personal information
- Born: August 15, 1999 (age 27); Brooklyn, New York, U.S.
- Listed height: 6 ft 1 in (1.85 m)
- Listed weight: 205 lb (93 kg)

Career information
- High school: Everett (Everett, Massachusetts)
- College: Assumption (2017–2020); South Carolina (2021)
- NFL draft: 2022: undrafted

Career history
- Pittsburgh Steelers (2022); Philadelphia Stars (2023)*; Calgary Stampeders (2024)*
- * Offseason or practice squad member only
- Stats at Pro Football Reference

Carlins Platel (born August 15, 1999) is an American former professional football cornerback. He played college football at Assumption and South Carolina. He signed with the Pittsburgh Steelers as an undrafted free agent in 2022.

== College career ==
After being unranked by every major recruiting site, Platel committed to play football at nearby Assumption College to play college football. He would be named to the NE10 All-Rookie Team as a freshman in 2017. He appeared in 10 games for the Greyhounds in 2018 and 2019, making First Team All-NE10 as a junior. After Assumption not being able to have a season in 2020 because of COVID-19, Platel transferred to South Carolina as a graduate transfer in 2021. He made seven starts for the Gamecocks at the nickel position in 2021, making 21 tackles to go along with two forced fumbles, both against Kentucky. Platel entered into the 2022 NFL draft after his lone season with South Carolina.

== Professional career ==
=== Pittsburgh Steelers ===
After going undrafted in the 2022 NFL Draft, Platel signed with the Pittsburgh Steelers as an undrafted free agent. He entered the 2022 season as the team's third nickel corner behind Arthur Maulet and Tre Norwood. In the team's preseason finale against the Detroit Lions, Platel suffered a knee injury which resulted in him being carted off the field. The Steelers him on IR on August 31, ending his season. Pittsburgh released Platel on March 10, 2023, along with William Jackson III.

=== Philadelphia Stars ===
Platel signed with the Philadelphia Stars of the USFL on June 13, 2023. He was placed on the inactive roster on the same day.

=== Calgary Stampeders ===
Platel signed with the Calgary Stampeders of the Canadian Football League (CFL) on February 1, 2024. He was released on May 27, 2024.
