= Alex Tillman =

American gridiron football player (born 1991)

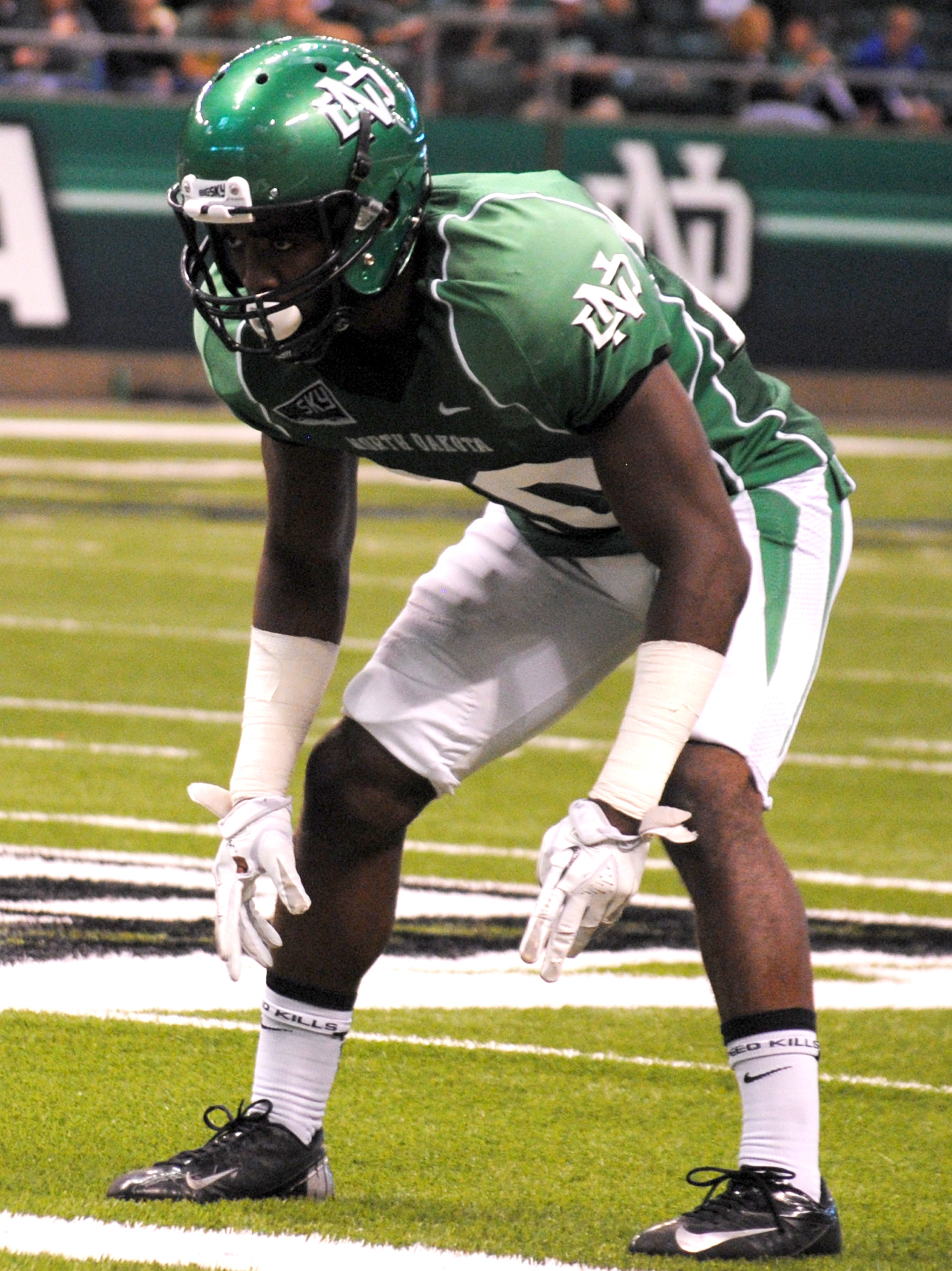
- Tillman at North Dakota in 2014

No. 28
- Position: Defensive back

Personal information
- Born: May 29, 1991 (age 35); Houston, Texas, U.S.
- Listed height: 5 ft 10 in (1.78 m)
- Listed weight: 190 lb (86 kg)

Career information
- High school: Cloverleaf (TX) North Shore Senior
- College: North Dakota

Career history
- 2015: BC Lions

Career CFL statistics
- Return yards: 120
- Tackles: 2
- Stats at CFL.ca

Alex Tillman (born May 29, 1991) is an American former professional football defensive back and punt returner who played for the BC Lions of the Canadian Football League (CFL). He attended the University of North Dakota and the University of Houston.

== Early life ==
Tillman attended North Shore Senior High School, where he played high school football as a quarterback. He earned three district championships at North Shore, and was named the Offensive and Team MVP during his senior year with over 2,000 passing yards and 500 rushing yards.

== College career ==
Tillman first played college football for the Houston Cougars. After redshirting in 2010, he played in 26 games on defense and the special teams from 2011 to 2013. Prior to the 2014 season, Tillman transferred to the University of North Dakota to complete his final year of eligibility. He recorded 31 solo tackles and a 92-yard interception for a touchdown in his final season, playing as a cornerback. He also returned 14 punts for 237 yards, including a school record 95-yard punt return for a touchdown. Tillman was designated an all-conference punt returner in the Big Sky Conference and received an honorable mention as a cornerback.

== Professional career ==
On May 27, 2015, Tillman was signed by the BC Lions as a free agent. He was among several potential candidates to replace Tim Brown as the team's kickoff returner during the preseason, and was also looked at as a potential punt returner. After making the active roster, Tillman made his CFL debut on July 4 against the Ottawa Redblacks, recording a tackle and returning three punts for 22 yards.
