= Jerry Hill =

Jerry Hill may refer to:

- Jerry Hill (American football) (born 1939), American football running back
- Jerry Hill (politician) (born 1947), American politician (California)
- Jerry Hill (racing driver) (born 1961), American racecar driver

== See also ==
- Gerald Hill (disambiguation)
- Gerry Hill (1913–2006), English cricketer
- Jeremy Hill (born 1992), American football player
- Jeremy Hill (baseball) (born 1977), American baseball player
- Hill (surname)
