= Willie Gaston =

American football player (born 1982)

No. 44
- Position: Cornerback

Personal information
- Born: December 15, 1982 (age 43); Houston, Texas, U.S.
- Listed height: 5 ft 10 in (1.78 m)
- Listed weight: 187 lb (85 kg)

Career information
- High school: North Shore (Houston)
- College: Houston
- NFL draft: 2007: undrafted

Career history
- Baltimore Ravens (2007)

Career NFL statistics
- Total tackles: 8
- Pass deflections: 1
- Stats at Pro Football Reference

Willie Lee Gaston (born December 15, 1982) is an American former professional football player who was a cornerback in the National Football League (NFL). He was signed by the Baltimore Ravens as an undrafted free agent in 2007. He played college football for the Houston Cougars.

Gaston attended Northshore High School in Houston, Texas, and was a letterman in football. In football, he was a starter as a quarterback and was twice named his team's Most Valuable Player.

In 2008 he returned to his alma mater as a teacher and coach. On February 28, 2023 he was named the Head Football Coach of North Shore Senior High School.
