= Matt Conerly =

American football player (born 1967)

Gerard Matt Conerly (born November 14, 1967) is an American former professional football player. He was signed as a replacement player in the National Football League (NFL) by the Houston Oilers. He also signed with teams in Norway and in the Arena Football League.

Raised in Houston, Texas, he graduated from North Shore High School. He practiced as a replacement player with the Houston Oilers during the 1987 NFL strike. In 1995 he spent a season in Stavanger, Norway, as a player for the Sandnes Oilers in the Norwegian American Football Federation (NAFF) and has also played in the Arena Football League for the Washington Commandos.
