= Mark Robinson (linebacker) =

American football player (born 1999)

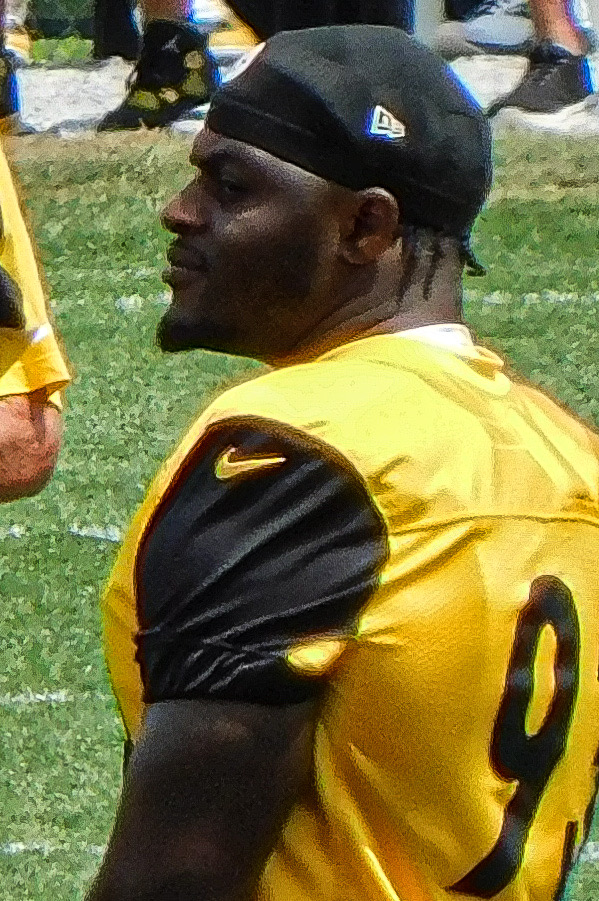
- Robinson with the Pittsburgh Steelers in 2025

Profile
- Position: Linebacker

Personal information
- Born: August 14, 1999 (age 27); Leesburg, Georgia, U.S.
- Listed height: 5 ft 11 in (1.80 m)
- Listed weight: 235 lb (107 kg)

Career information
- High school: Lee County (Leesburg)
- College: Presbyterian (2017); Southeast Missouri State (2018–2019); Ole Miss (2020–2021)
- NFL draft: 2022: 7th round, 225th overall pick

Career history
- Pittsburgh Steelers (2022–2024); New England Patriots (2025); New York Jets (2025); Pittsburgh Steelers (2025); Cleveland Browns (2025)*
- * Offseason or practice squad member only

Career NFL statistics
- Total tackles: 50
- Sacks: 1
- Forced fumbles: 3
- Stats at Pro Football Reference

Mark Isaiah Robinson (born August 14, 1999) is an American professional football linebacker. He played college football at Presbyterian, Southeast Missouri State, and Ole Miss.

== College career ==
Robinson began his college football career as a running back. He played for Presbyterian in 2017, rushing for 332 yards. He then transferred to Southeast Missouri State, where he rushed for 364 yards in 2018, and 546 yards in 2019. He then transferred to Ole Miss as a walk-on. He did not play during the 2020 season. Robinson switched to linebacker in April 2021. He was awarded a scholarship at Ole Miss in June 2021. He recorded 90 tackles for Ole Miss in 2021.

=== Statistics ===
Year	Team	GP	Tackles				Rushing			
Year	Team	GP	Total	Solo	Ast	Sack	Att	Yds	Avg	TD
2017	Presbyterian	11	1	1	0	0.0	75	332	4.4	5
2018	Southeast Missouri State	13	3	1	2	0.0	74	364	4.9	4
2019	Southeast Missouri State	13	0	0	0	0.0	117	546	4.7	7
2020	Ole Miss	0	Did not play							
2021	Ole Miss	13	90	42	48	3.0	0	0	0.0	0
Career		50	94	44	50	3.0	266	1,242	4.7	16

== Professional career ==
Pre-draft measurables
Height	Weight	Arm length	Hand span	40-yard dash	10-yard split	20-yard split	20-yard shuttle	Three-cone drill	Vertical jump	Broad jump	Bench press
5 ft 11 1/2 in (1.82 m)	230 lb (104 kg)	29 1/2 in (0.75 m)	9 1/8 in (0.23 m)	4.69 s	1.61 s	2.70 s	4.38 s	7.35 s	33.5 in (0.85 m)	9 ft 11 in (3.02 m)	34 reps
All values from Pro Day

=== Pittsburgh Steelers (first stint) ===
Robinson was selected in the seventh round, 225th overall, of the 2022 NFL draft by the Pittsburgh Steelers. He made his NFL debut on October 16, 2022, in Pittsburgh's game against the Tampa Bay Buccaneers. As a rookie, he appeared in four games and had nine total tackles.

On January 6, 2024, he recorded his first career sack in a 17–10 win over the Baltimore Ravens.

Robinson was waived by the Steelers on August 25, 2025.

=== New England Patriots ===
On August 28, 2025, Robinson was signed to the New England Patriots' practice squad.

=== New York Jets ===
On September 23, 2025, the New York Jets signed Robinson to their active roster off the Patriots practice squad. He was waived on October 18.

=== Pittsburgh Steelers (second stint) ===
On November 4, 2025, Robinson signed with the Pittsburgh Steelers' practice squad. He was released by the Steelers on November 25.

=== Cleveland Browns ===
On December 2, 2025, Robinson was signed to the Cleveland Browns' practice squad. He was released on December 9.
