= Emeke Egbule =

American football player (born 1996)

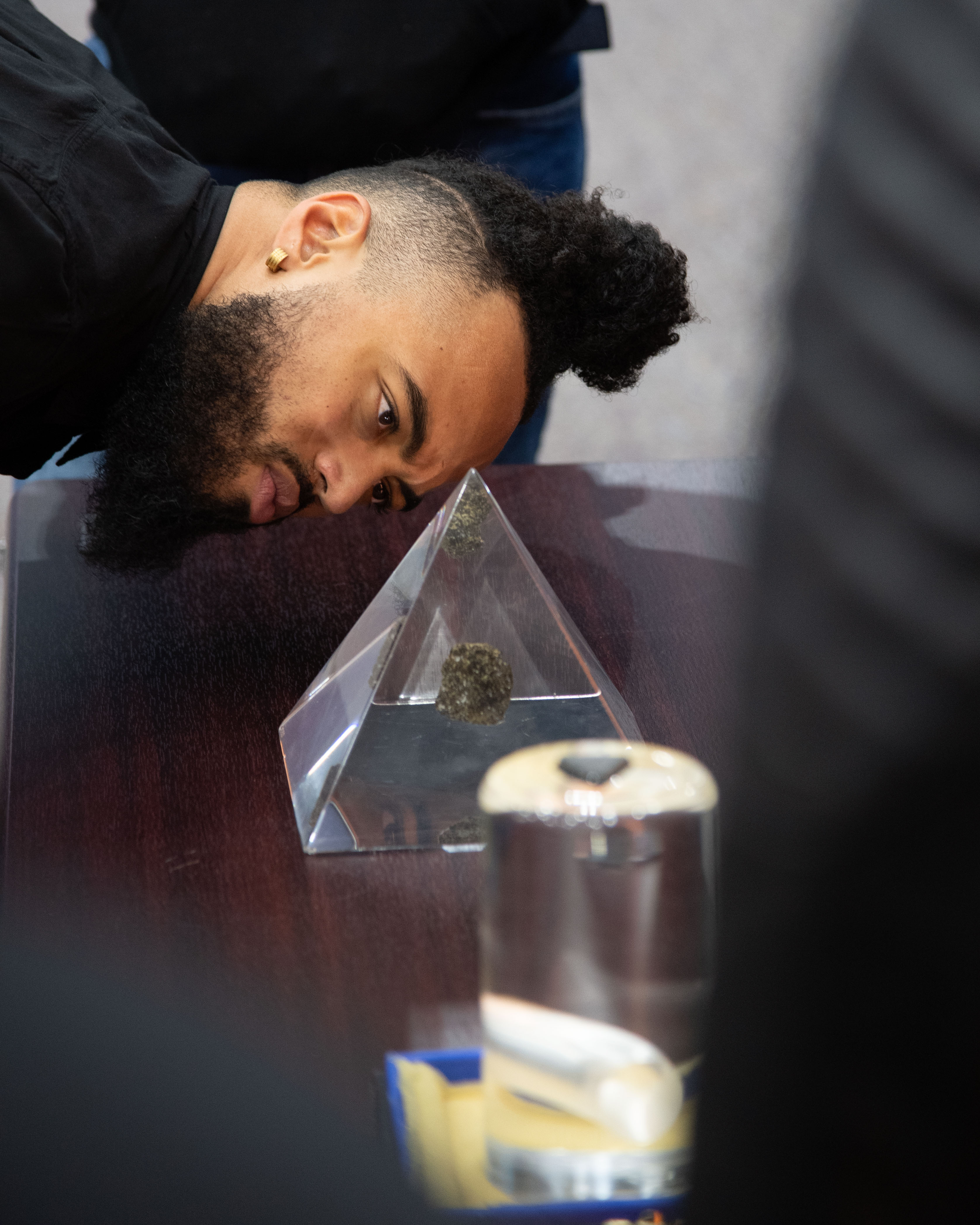
- Egbule at a NASA event in 2020

Profile
- Position: Linebacker

Personal information
- Born: October 13, 1996 (age 30); Galena Park, Texas, U.S.
- Listed height: 6 ft 2 in (1.88 m)
- Listed weight: 245 lb (111 kg)

Career information
- High school: North Shore (Houston, Texas)
- College: Houston (2015–2018)
- NFL draft: 2019: 6th round, 200th overall pick

Career history
- Los Angeles Chargers (2019–2021); Pittsburgh Steelers (2022)*; Edmonton Elks (2023); St. Louis Battlehawks (2024)*; Edmonton Elks (2024)*
- * Offseason or practice squad member only

Career NFL statistics
- Total tackles: 13
- Stats at Pro Football Reference

Chukuemeke MaCauley Egbule (born October 13, 1996) is an American professional football linebacker. He played college football at Houston.

== Early life ==
Emeke Egbule attended North Shore Senior High School. He played both football and basketball for his school. He was named to the 2013 district 21-5A all-district first-team as a tight end.

== College career ==
Egbule played four years of college football at the University of Houston as a linebacker. He finished his four years with a total of 162 tackles.

== Professional career ==
Pre-draft measurables
Height	Weight	Arm length	Hand span	40-yard dash	10-yard split	20-yard split	20-yard shuttle	Three-cone drill	Vertical jump	Broad jump	Bench press
6 ft 2 in (1.88 m)	245 lb (111 kg)	33 in (0.84 m)	9 1/4 in (0.23 m)	4.65 s	1.55 s	2.69 s	4.38 s	7.09 s	33.0 in (0.84 m)	9 ft 11 in (3.02 m)	20 reps
All values from NFL Combine/Pro Day

=== Los Angeles Chargers ===
Egbule was selected by the Los Angeles Chargers in the sixth round (200th overall) of the 2019 NFL draft.

On August 31, 2021, Egbule was waived by the Chargers and re-signed to the practice squad the next day. He signed a reserve/future contract with the Chargers on January 11, 2022.

On August 30, 2022, Egbule was waived by the Chargers.

=== Pittsburgh Steelers ===
On December 7, 2022, Egbule was signed to the Pittsburgh Steelers practice squad. He signed a reserve/future contract on January 10, 2023. He was released on May 22, 2023.

=== Edmonton Elks (first stint) ===
On September 18, 2023, Egbule signed with the Edmonton Elks of the Canadian Football League (CFL). He was released on October 17, 2023.

=== St. Louis Battlehawks ===
On November 16, 2022, Egbule was selected by the St. Louis Battlehawks of the XFL in the 2023 XFL draft, but did not play after signing with the Steelers. He signed a letter of intent with the Battlehawks on December 6, 2023. He was waived on March 22, 2024.

=== Edmonton Elks (second stint) ===
On March 26, 2024, Egbule returned to the Elks. He was released on May 15.
