= William Jackson III =

American football player (born 1992)

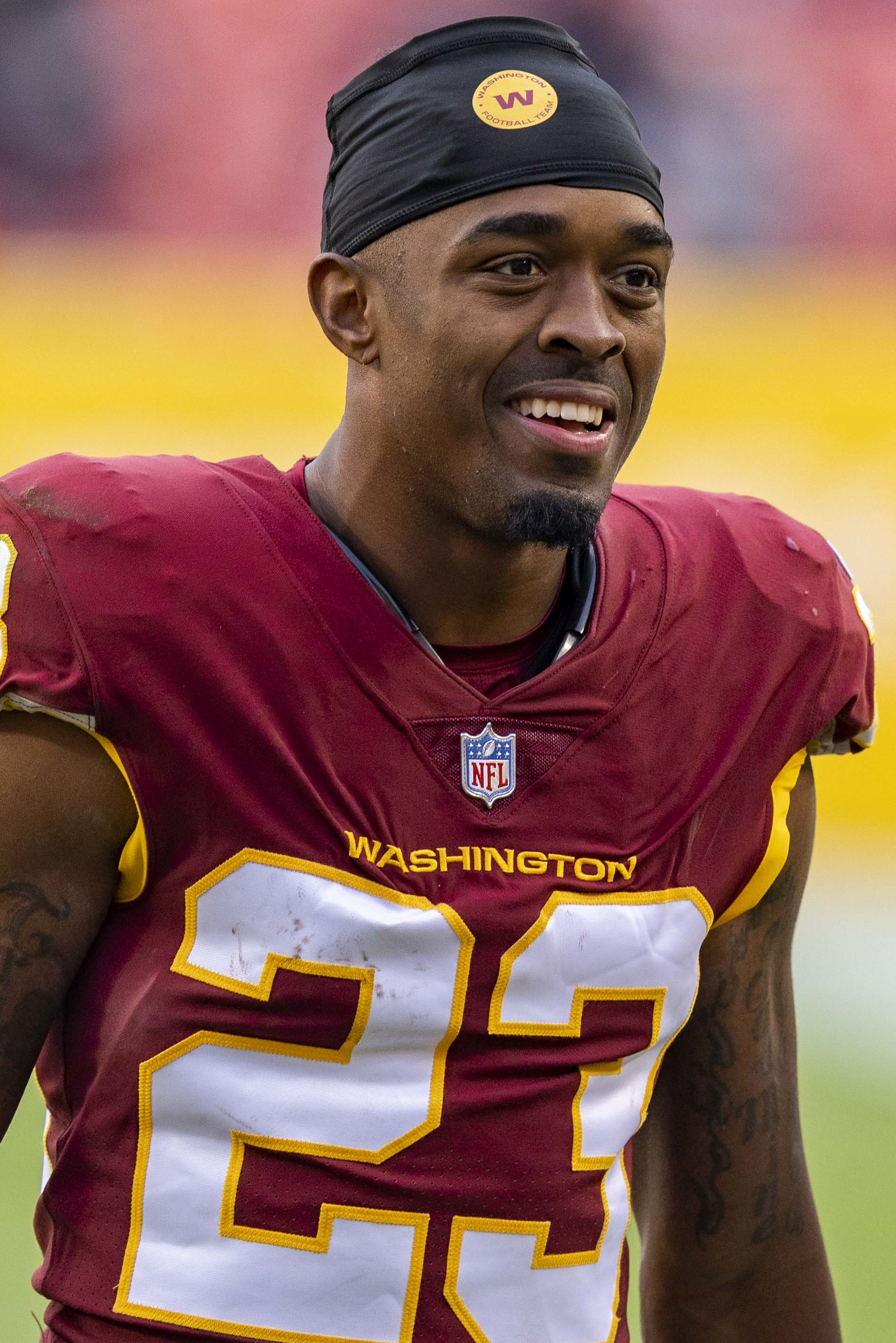
- Jackson with the Washington Football Team in 2021

No. 22, 23, 3
- Position: Cornerback

Personal information
- Born: October 27, 1992 (age 34); Houston, Texas, U.S.
- Listed height: 6 ft 0 in (1.83 m)
- Listed weight: 189 lb (86 kg)

Career information
- High school: Wheatley (Houston)
- College: Trinity Valley CC (2012); Houston (2013–2015)
- NFL draft: 2016: 1st round, 24th overall pick

Career history
- Cincinnati Bengals (2016–2020); Washington Football Team / Commanders (2021–2022); Pittsburgh Steelers (2022)*
- * Offseason or practice squad member only

Awards and highlights
- 2× second-team All-AAC (2014, 2015)

Career NFL statistics
- Total tackles: 205
- Sacks: 1
- Pass deflections: 51
- Interceptions: 5
- Defensive touchdowns: 1
- Stats at Pro Football Reference

William Jackson III (born October 27, 1992) is an American former professional football player who was a cornerback in the National Football League (NFL). He played college football for the Houston Cougars and was selected by the Cincinnati Bengals in the first round of the 2016 NFL draft. Jackson was also a member of the Washington Football Team / Commanders and Pittsburgh Steelers.

== Early life ==
Jackson was born on October 27, 1992, and grew up in the Fifth Ward area of Houston, Texas, alongside a brother and three sisters. He attended and played football at Wheatley High School in the city, where he was teammates with fellow NFL cornerback Xavien Howard. Jackson was considered a three-star prospect by Rivals.com. He accepted a scholarship to play college football at the University of Houston.

== College career ==
Jackson attended Trinity Valley Community College for his freshman year before transferring to the University of Houston for his sophomore year. As a senior in 2015, he broke up 23 passes and had five interceptions.

=== Statistics ===
Season	GP	Defense				
Season	GP	Cmb	TfL	PD	Int	FF
2015	12	43	1.5	23	5	0
Totals	12	43	1.5	23	5	0

== Professional career ==
=== Pre-draft ===
With a deep cornerback class going into the combine, many analysts were more focused on Vernon Hargreaves III, Jalen Ramsey, and Mackensie Alexander, regarding them as the top players at their position and had Jackson as a second round selection. Jackson attended the NFL Combine but was unable to finish all the drills at the combine after suffering cramps. On March 31, 2016, Jackson attended Houston's Pro Day. He was projected to be an early round pick in the draft at the conclusion of the pre-draft.

Pre-draft measurables
Height	Weight	Arm length	Hand span	40-yard dash	10-yard split	20-yard split	20-yard shuttle	Three-cone drill	Broad jump	Bench press
6 ft 0 3/8 in (1.84 m)	189 lb (86 kg)	31 3/4 in (0.81 m)	9 1/4 in (0.23 m)	4.37 s	1.56 s	2.52 s	4.32 s	6.86 s	9 ft 8 in (2.95 m)	10 reps
All values from NFL Combine and Houston Cougars pro day.

=== Cincinnati Bengals ===
The Cincinnati Bengals selected Jackson in the first round (24th overall) of the 2016 NFL draft. On June 10, 2016, Jackson signed his four-year, $9.07 million rookie contract with the team. Throughout training camp, Jackson competed to be the Bengals' third cornerback on the depth chart against Darqueze Dennard. During camp, Jackson had suffered a torn pectoral muscle and would have to undergo surgery, leading him to miss his entire rookie season after he was placed on injured reserve prior to Week 1.

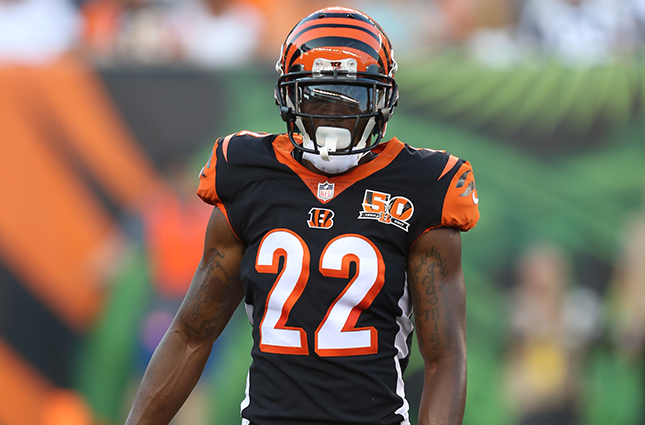
Jackson III in 2017

Returning fully healthy in 2017, he made his debut in the season-opener against the Baltimore Ravens and made two solo tackles and a pass deflection in a loss. In Week 3 against the Green Bay Packers, Jackson recorded four solo tackles, a pass deflection, and returned an interception off a pass by quarterback Aaron Rodgers for a 75-yard touchdown. With the interception, he became just the second player in NFL history to return one thrown by Rodgers for a touchdown. In Week 7, Jackson earned his first career start after Adam Jones was inactive due to a back injury. In Week 10, he recorded two solo tackles and made his first career sack during a 24–20 loss at the Tennessee Titans. He was inactive for the Bengals' Week 11 victory at the Denver Broncos due to a toe injury. Jackson became a starting cornerback again for the Bengals' in Week 14 after Jones was placed on injured reserve due to a groin injury. In Week 15, he collected a season-high five combined tackles during a 34–7 loss at the Minnesota Vikings. Jackson finished the 2017 season with 27 tackles, 14 pass deflections, a sack, an interception, and a touchdown.

Throughout training camp in 2018, Jackson competed against Darqueze Dennard to be a starting cornerback. Head coach Marvin Lewis named Jackson and Dre Kirkpatrick the starting cornerbacks to begin the regular season.

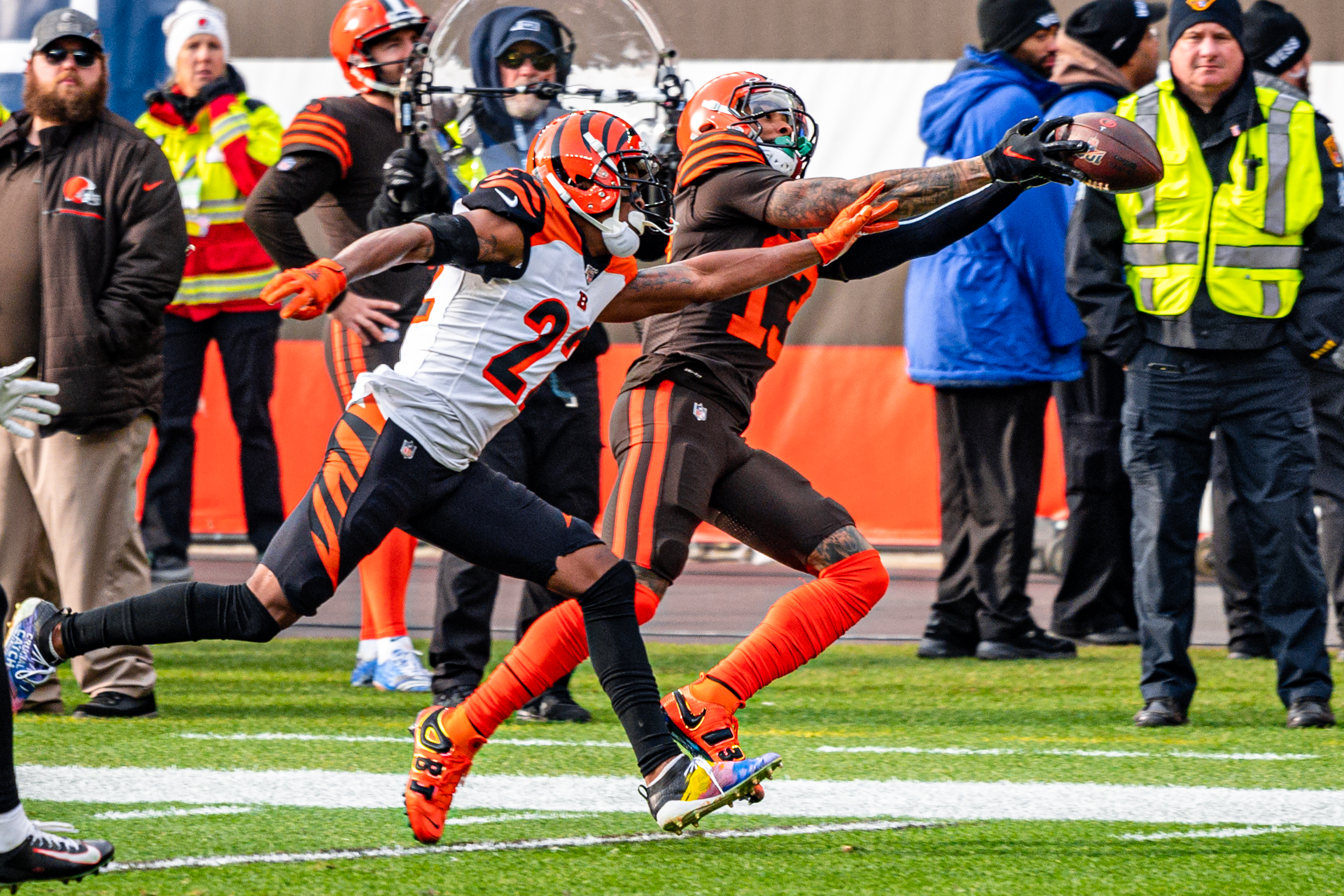
Jackson playing against the Cleveland Browns in 2019.

In April 2019, the Bengals picked up the fifth-year option on Jackson's contract. In Week 2 against the San Francisco 49ers, Jackson recorded his first interception of the season off Jimmy Garoppolo in the 41-17 loss. He was placed on injured reserve due to a shoulder injury in December 2019. He finished the season with 37 tackles, three passes defensed, and an interception.

Jackson recorded an interception off a pass thrown by Baker Mayfield in Week 2 of the 2020 season against the Cleveland Browns.

=== Washington Football Team / Commanders ===
Jackson signed a three-year, $40.5 million contract with the Washington Football Team on March 19, 2021. He recorded his first interception with Washington in the season opener against Los Angeles Chargers quarterback Justin Herbert. In the Week 10 win over the Tampa Bay Buccaneers, Jackson recorded his second interception of the season off a pass thrown by Tom Brady after safety Kamren Curl popped the ball loose from Buccaneers receiver Jaelon Darden. Jackson missed the final two games of the 2021 season due to a calf injury then being placed on the COVID-19 reserve list on January 5, 2022.

In Week 5 of the 2022 season, Jackson was benched in the first quarter against the Titans. Jackson stated he left the game due to a bulging disc in his back, but head coach Ron Rivera stated "We just decided to make a change" when asked by media to confirm Jackson's claim. Jackson was reported to request a trade from the team on October 13, 2022. The Commanders made Jackson inactive for the next three games.

=== Pittsburgh Steelers ===
On November 1, 2022, Jackson was traded to the Pittsburgh Steelers along with a conditional 2025 seventh-round pick for a conditional 2025 sixth-round pick. He was placed on injured reserve on November 12, 2022. The Steelers released Jackson on March 10, 2023, after having never played a down for the team.

== NFL career statistics ==
Year	Team	Games		Tackles				Interceptions						Fumbles	
Year	Team	GP	GS	Cmb	Solo	Ast	Sck	PD	Int	Yds	Avg	Lng	TD	FF	FR
2016	CIN	0	0	Did not play due to injury											
2017	CIN	15	5	27	21	6	1.0	14	1	75	75.0	75	1	0	0
2018	CIN	16	16	41	34	7	0.0	13	0	0	0.0	0	0	0	0
2019	CIN	14	13	37	26	11	0.0	3	1	19	19.0	19	0	0	0
2020	CIN	14	14	45	38	7	0.0	11	1	30	30.0	30	0	0	0
2021	WAS	12	12	39	36	3	0.0	8	2	0	0.0	0	0	0	0
2022	WAS	4	4	16	15	1	0.0	2	0	0	0.0	0	0	0	0
2022	PIT	0	0	Did not play due to injury											
Career		75	64	205	170	35	1.0	51	5	124	24.8	75	1	0	0
