= Jaylen Warren =

American football player (born 1998)

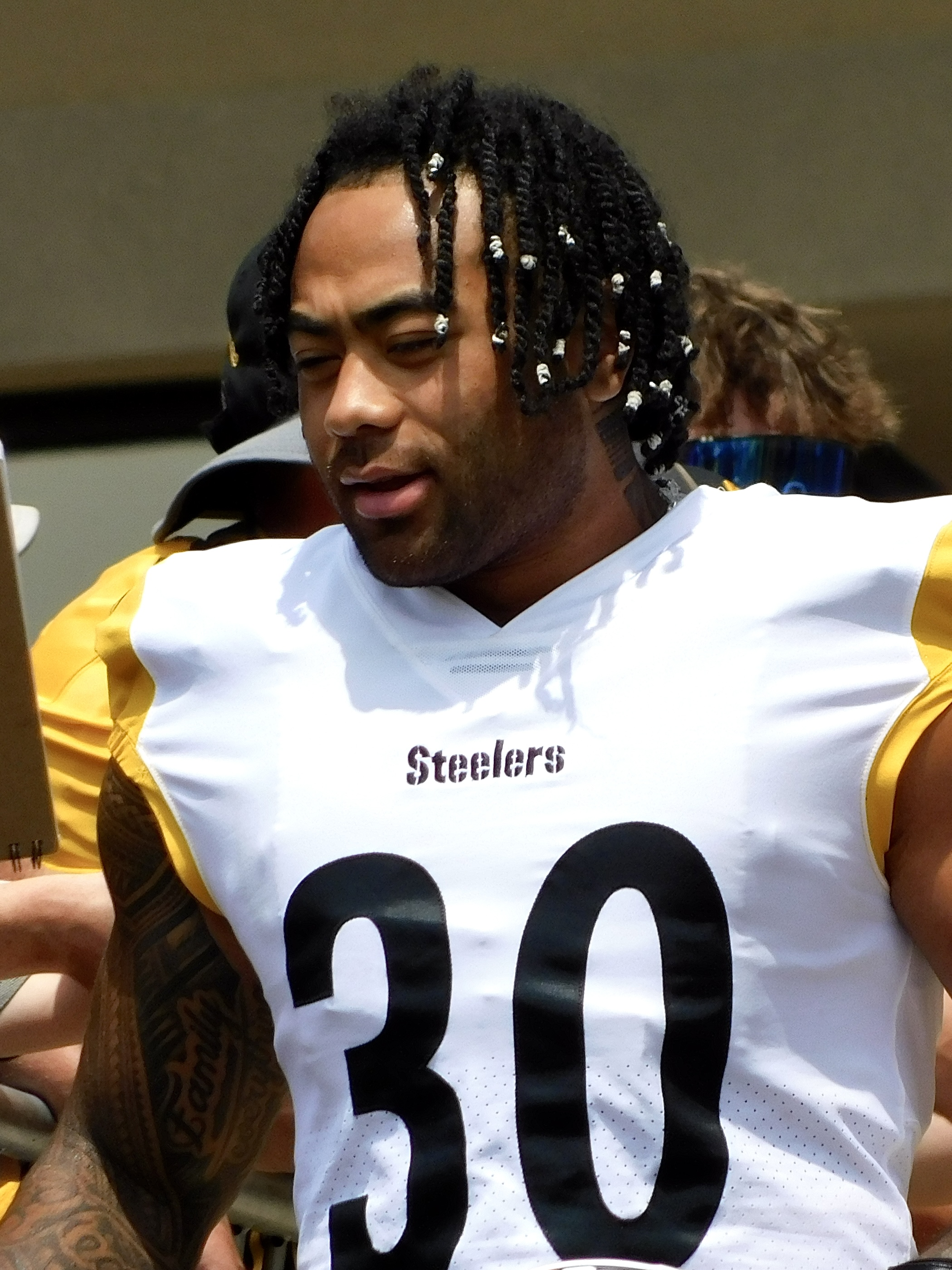
- Warren with the Pittsburgh Steelers in 2025

No. 30 – Pittsburgh Steelers
- Position: Running back
- Roster status: Active

Personal information
- Born: November 1, 1998 (age 28); Clinton, North Carolina, U.S.
- Listed height: 5 ft 8 in (1.73 m)
- Listed weight: 215 lb (98 kg)

Career information
- High school: East (Salt Lake City, Utah)
- College: Snow (2017–2018); Utah State (2019–2020); Oklahoma State (2021)
- NFL draft: 2022: undrafted

Career history
- Pittsburgh Steelers (2022–present)

Awards and highlights
- Big 12 Offensive Newcomer of the Year (2021); NJCAA National Offensive Player of the Year (2018); NJCAA First-team All-American (2018)

Career NFL statistics as of Week 10, 2026
- Rushing yards: 3,351
- Rushing average: 4.9
- Rushing touchdowns: 14
- Receptions: 197
- Receiving yards: 1,547
- Receiving touchdowns: 3
- Stats at Pro Football Reference

Derrell Jaylen Warren (born November 1, 1998) is an American professional football running back for the Pittsburgh Steelers of the National Football League (NFL). He played college football at Snow College, Utah State and Oklahoma State.

== Early life ==
Warren was born in Clinton, North Carolina, on November 1, 1998. He attended East High School in Salt Lake City, Utah where as a senior, he rushed for 3,099 yards to break the 37-year-old single-season state rushing record (previously held by BYU national champion, Kelly Smith), while becoming the first player in Utah history to break the 3,000-yard mark. Warren rushed for 38 rushing touchdowns in 2016 while also rushing for 100 yards in all 14 games, including 200 yards in 12 games. Warren helped lead the Leopards to a 14–0 season and second consecutive Class 4A state championship.

== College career ==
Warren played college football at Snow College, Utah State, and Oklahoma State.

In 2018, Warren was named NJCAA National Offensive Player of the Year and NJCAA First Team All-America. In just nine games, Warren tallied 1,435 yards on the ground with 15 touchdowns averaging 159.4 rushing yards per game.

In 2019, Warren transferred to Utah State. He was second on the team with 569 yards rushing. In his first Division I game with the Aggies he ran for a season high 141 yards against the Wake Forest Demon Deacons.

In 2020, Warren would only play in three games in the COVID-19 shortened season. He led the team with 252 rushing yards and three touchdowns. On November 14, Warren ran for a season high 136 yards and one touchdown against Fresno State Bulldogs. During his two year tenure at Utah State, Warren was named Academic All-Mountain West Conference in both 2019 and 2020.

In 2021, Warren transferred to Oklahoma State University for his Senior season. He rushed for 1,216 yards and 11 touchdowns. Warren played in all 14 contests and started the final 12. On September 18, Warren ran for a season high 218 yards on 32 attempts against the Boise State Broncos and scored two touchdowns including a season long 75 yard touchdown in a 21–20 victory.

=== College statistics ===
Year	Team	GP	Rushing					Receiving				
Year	Team	GP	Att	Yds	Avg	Lng	TD	Rec	Yds	Avg	Lng	TD
2017	Snow	10	132	1,016	7.7	66	11	8	82	10.2	42	0
2018	Snow	9	167	1,435	8.6	80	15	10	78	7.8	21	0
2019	Utah State	12	112	569	5.1	59	5	15	182	12.1	31	0
2020	Utah State	3	39	252	6.5	86	3	5	33	6.6	11	0
2021	Oklahoma State	14	256	1,216	4.8	75	11	25	225	9.0	52	0
Career		47	706	4,488	6.3	86	45	63	600	9.5	52	0

== Professional career ==
Pre-draft measurables
Height	Weight	Arm length	Hand span	Wingspan	40-yard dash	10-yard split	20-yard split	20-yard shuttle	Three-cone drill	Vertical jump	Broad jump
5 ft 8 in (1.73 m)	204 lb (93 kg)	29 7/8 in (0.76 m)	9 1/4 in (0.23 m)	5 ft 10 3/4 in (1.80 m)	4.55 s	1.54 s	2.63 s	4.42 s	7.13 s	34.0 in (0.86 m)	9 ft 11 in (3.02 m)
All values from NFL Combine/Pro Day

=== 2022 season ===
Warren signed with the Pittsburgh Steelers as an undrafted free agent in 2022. Following an impressive training camp and preseason, Warren made the final roster on August 31, 2022. After signing with Pittsburgh, it was revealed that Warren is a cousin of former NFL running back Willie Parker, who also signed with the Steelers after going undrafted.

Warren got his first professional start in Week 1 against the Cincinnati Bengals. In the 23–20 Steelers victory, Warren had three carries for seven yards. He scored his first career touchdown on December 18, 2022 on a two yard rushing touchdown against the Carolina Panthers in a 24–16 win for the Steelers.

On New Years Day, 2023, Warren had 12 carries for 76 yards, he also caught three passes for 22 yards, totaling 98 all purpose yards in the narrow 16–13 road victory. Though he did not score a touchdown, it was statistically Warren's best game during the season.

As a rookie, he finished with 77 carries for 379 rushing yards and one rushing touchdown to go along with 28 receptions for 214 receiving yards.

=== 2023 season ===
Despite a slow start to the season, 2023 would prove to be a breakout year for Warren. On September 10, against the San Francisco 49ers, Warren only had three carries for six yards. He also caught five passes of six targets for 12 yards. In total for the game, Warren was only able to eclipse 18 all purpose yards in the 30–7 loss.

The following week on Monday Night Football, Warren made six carries for 20 yards. However, he caught four passes for 66 yards. This would be the first game of his professional career where he had more receiving yards than rushing and totaled 86 all purpose yards. He wouldn't record his first touchdown of the season until Week 7 against the Los Angeles Rams in which he recorded a 13 yard rushing touchdown.

Ahead of Week 12 against the Green Bay Packers, Warren was named the starting running back over Najee Harris. In the game, Warren had 15 carries for 101 yards and a touchdown. This was the first game of his professional career to surpass 100 rushing yards in the Steelers victory.

Warren was able to clinch another 100+ yard game the following week against the Cleveland Browns. He had nine carries for 129 yards and one rushing touchdown. His single touchdown was a 74 yard run to put the first score on the board for the team. It was also the only touchdown scored by the Steelers in a narrow 13–10 loss. Despite the loss, the game eclipsed any previous performance Warren had statistically with 145 all purpose yards.

In a must-win scenario for the Steelers to keep their playoff hopes alive against the Seattle Seahawks on New Year's Eve, Warren was able to score the first touchdown of the game from either team when he was able to score on an 18 yard touchdown run. Warren finished the road victory with 13 carries for 75 yards and one touchdown. He also caught four passes for 23 yards.

Warren got to see the field during the post-season for the first time of his career in the AFC Wildcard Round against the Buffalo Bills. During the game, Warren had eight carries for 38 yards. He was able to make two receptions on two targets as well for 16 yards. Warren and the Steelers finished their season losing to the Bills 31–17.

He finished his sophomore season having played in all 17 regular season games and one post-season game. He had 149 carries 789 yards, four touchdowns and caught 61 passes for 370 yards. He had amassed 1,229 all purpose yards throughout all 18 games.

=== 2024 season ===
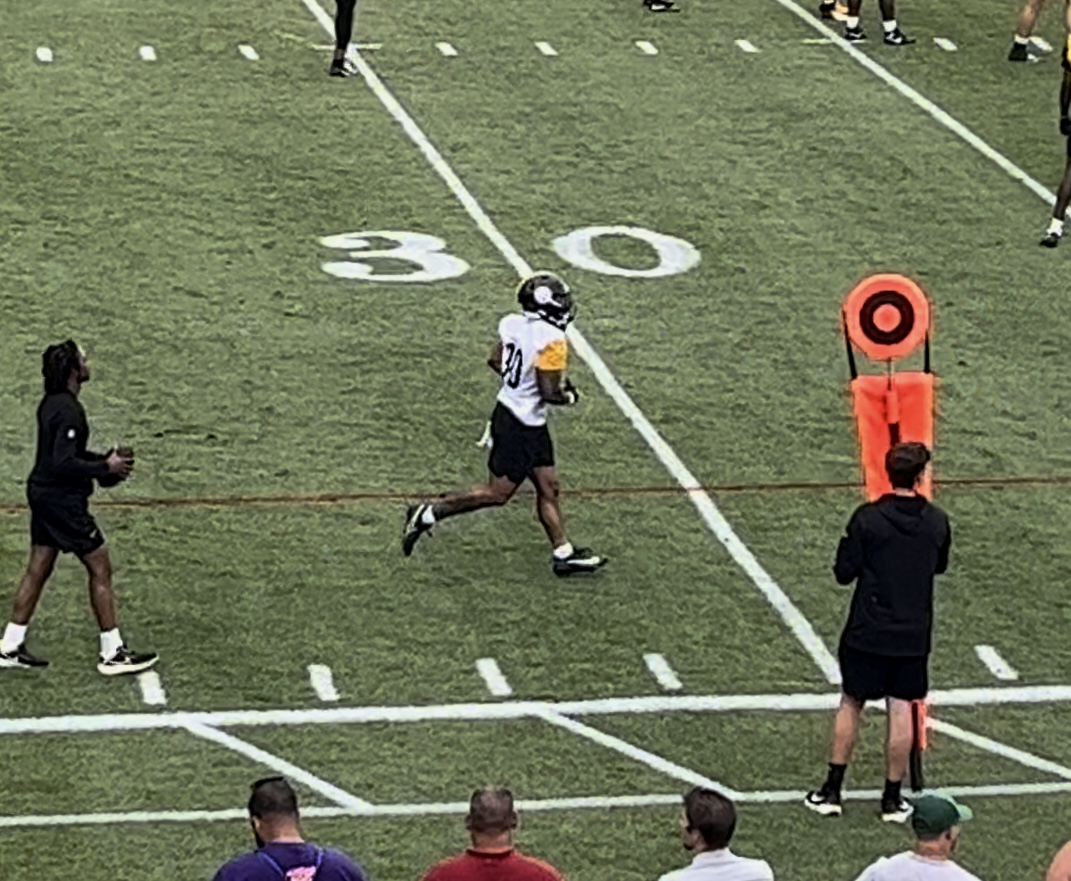
Warren in 2024

Early in the 2024 offseason, Warren and fellow running back Najee Harris were praised by Steelers head coach Mike Tomlin as "strong-minded runners" who "run to the fight".

During a preseason game against the Buffalo Bills, Warren left the field with a hamstring injury, knocking him from the final preseason game and leaving it questionable whether he would play in Week 1 or not. Ultimately, Warren played in Week 1's matchup against the Falcons, getting two carries for seven yards as well as catching two passes for 13 yards. Warren had his best statistical game of the season during the Steelers' 28–27 victory over the Washington Commanders. In the game, he had 14 carries for 66 yards and caught two passes for 29 yards, accumulating 95 all purpose yards, the closest he came to the century mark following his preseason injury. On November 21, 2024, Warren scored his first touchdown of the season on a three yard run for the Steelers' first touchdown of the game in the fourth quarter. Warren and the Steelers finished the game with a 19–24 loss to the Cleveland Browns on Monday Night Football.

He finished the regular season with 120 carries for 511 yards and one touchdown as the team finished with a 10–7 record, giving Warren another playoff appearance. In the AFC Wild Card round against division rivals Baltimore Ravens, Warren had two carries for six yards while also catching four passes for 19 yards as the Steelers lost 28–14, ending their season.

=== 2025 season ===
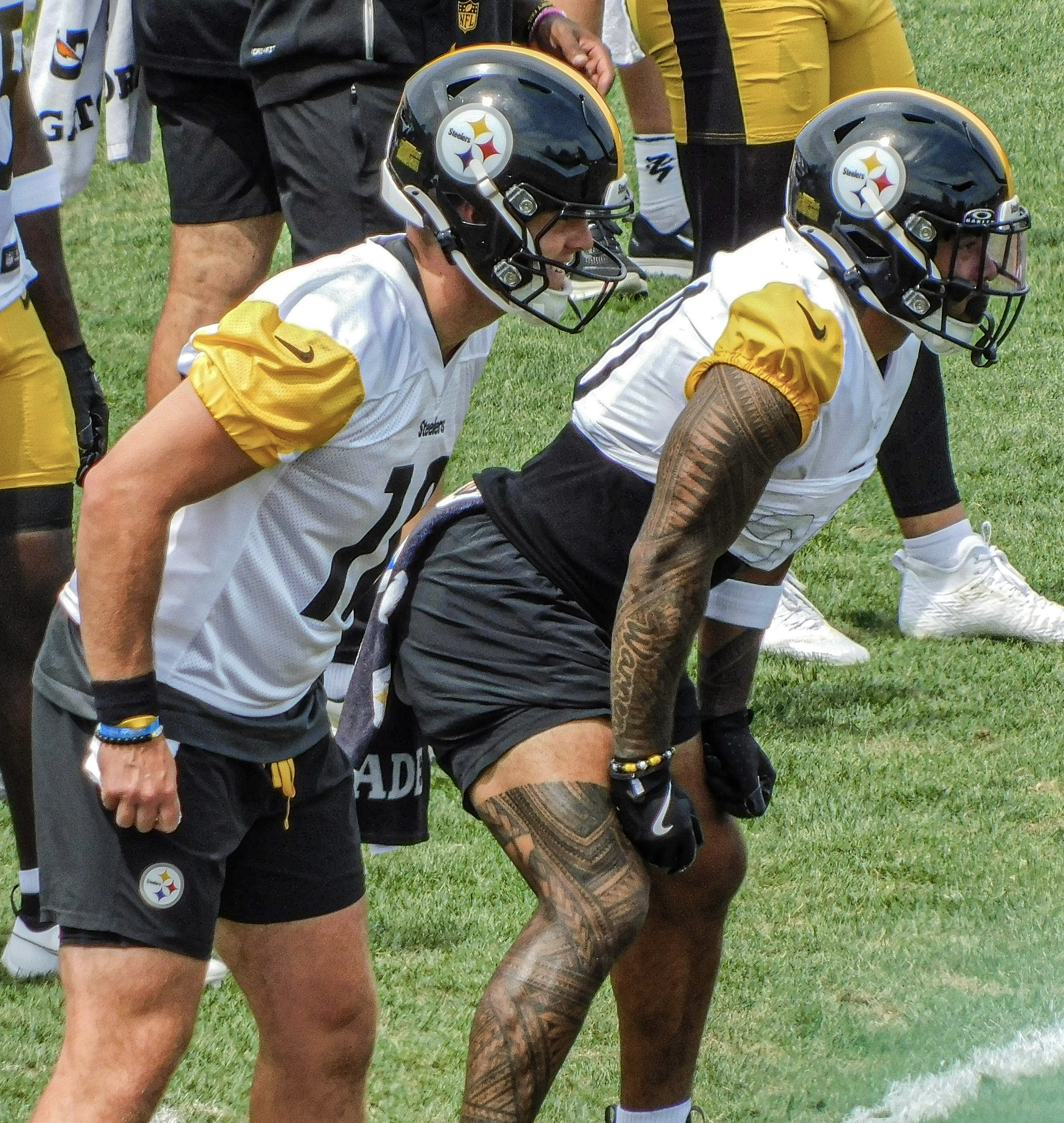
Warren with quarterback Will Howard during training camp in 2025

On April 22, 2025, Warren re-signed with Pittsburgh on a one-year restricted free agent tender worth $5.3 million. Since the team did not re-sign Najee Harris in the 2025 offseason, Warren was anointed the starting running back position ahead of Kenneth Gainwell as well as Kaleb Johnson. On September 1, he signed a two-year contract extension through the 2027 season.

Prior to Week 4's victory over the Minnesota Vikings in Ireland, Warren was ruled out with a knee injury. He returned from his knee injury following Pittsburgh's Week 5 bye to play against the Cleveland Browns. In Week 7, on the road against the Bengals, he had 158 scrimmage yards in the 33–31 loss. In Week 16 against the Lions, he had 14 carries for 143 yards and two touchdowns in the 29–24 win. He finished the 2025 season with 211 carries for 958 rushing yards and six rushing touchdowns to go with 40 receptions for 333 receiving yards and two receiving touchdowns.

=== 2026 season ===
Aaron Rodgers hands the ball off to Warren in 2026

In Week 5 against the Indianapolis Colts, Warren became the first player in Steelers history with a 50-yard rushing TD and an 80-yard scoring catch in the same game and the first in the NFL to pull off the feat since Herschel Walker in 1986, earning him AFC Offensive Player of the Week.

== NFL career statistics ==
Legend
**Bold**	Career high

=== Regular season ===
Year	Team	Games		Rushing					Receiving					Kick returns					Fumbles	
Year	Team	GP	GS	Att	Yds	Y/A	Lng	TD	Rec	Yds	Y/R	Lng	TD	Ret	Yds	Y/Ret	Lng	TD	Fum	Lost
2022	PIT	16	0	77	379	4.9	31	1	28	214	7.6	26	0	0	0	0.0	0	0	1	0
2023	PIT	17	0	149	784	5.3	**74**	4	**61**	**370**	6.1	30	0	0	0	0.0	0	0	4	1
2024	PIT	15	0	120	511	4.3	22	1	38	310	8.2	29	0	**9**	**227**	25.2	**35**	0	2	1
2025	PIT	16	15	**211**	**958**	4.5	45	**6**	40	333	8.3	65	**2**	8	205	**25.6**	31	0	1	0
2026	PIT	9	8	126	719	**5.7**	51	2	30	320	**10.7**	**80**	1	0	0	0.0	0	0	3	1
Career		73	23	683	3,351	4.9	74	14	197	1,547	7.9	80	3	17	432	25.4	35	0	17	2

=== Postseason ===
Year	Team	Games		Rushing					Receiving					Kick returns					Fumbles	
Year	Team	GP	GS	Att	Yds	Y/A	Lng	TD	Rec	Yds	Y/R	Lng	TD	Ret	Yds	Y/Ret	Lng	TD	Fum	Lost
2023	PIT	1	0	8	38	**4.8**	**12**	0	2	16	**8.0**	**16**	0	**1**	**21**	**21.0**	**21**	0	0	0
2024	PIT	1	0	2	6	3.0	4	0	**4**	**19**	4.8	7	0	0	0	0.0	0	0	0	0
2025	PIT	1	1	**12**	**43**	3.6	**12**	0	1	4	4.0	4	0	0	0	0.0	0	0	0	0
Career		3	1	22	87	4.0	12	0	7	39	5.6	16	0	1	21	21.0	21	0	0	0

== Personal life ==
Warren is of partial Samoan descent.
