= 2025 Pittsburgh Steelers season =

93rd season in franchise history

- Owner: The Rooney Family
- General manager: Omar Khan
- Head coach: Mike Tomlin
- Offensive coordinator: Arthur Smith
- Defensive coordinator: Teryl Austin
- Home stadium: Acrisure Stadium

Results
- Record: 10–7
- Division place: 1st AFC North
- Playoffs: Lost Wild Card Playoffs (vs. Texans) 6–30
- All-Pros: DT Cameron Heyward (2nd team)
- Pro Bowlers: FS Jalen Ramsey; ST Ben Skowronek; OLB T. J. Watt
- Team MVP: RB Kenneth Gainwell
- Team ROY: DE Derrick Harmon

Uniform
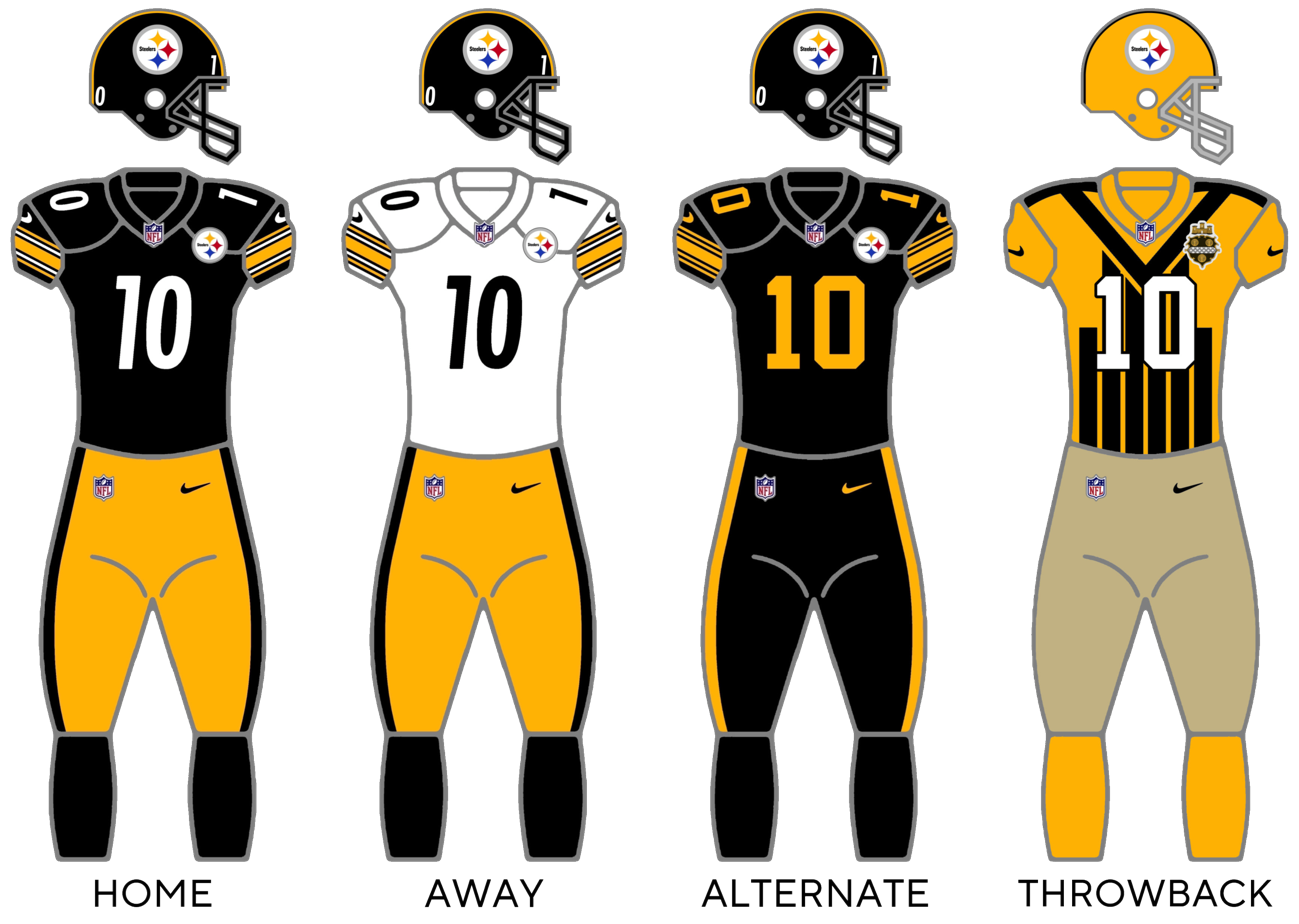

The 2025 season was the Pittsburgh Steelers' 93rd in the National Football League (NFL), their fourth under general manager Omar Khan, their 25th playing their home games at Acrisure Stadium and their 19th and final season under head coach Mike Tomlin. They matched their 10–7 records from both 2023 and 2024 and made the playoffs for the third consecutive season, and ended their four-year AFC North title drought with a win over the Baltimore Ravens during Week 18.

Since quarterbacks Justin Fields and Russell Wilson left, Aaron Rodgers started for Pittsburgh in his 21st season in the league. With a Week 16 win over the Detroit Lions, head coach Mike Tomlin reached his 200th total career win, and the Steelers secured its 22nd consecutive non-losing season, breaking the record set by the 1965–1985 Dallas Cowboys. From Pittsburgh's season tally of 45 touchdowns, 42 were scored by the offense, the most for the team since they scored 47 offensive touchdowns in 2020.

In the playoffs, the Steelers were defeated by Houston Texans in the Wild Card Round by a score of 30–6, marking their seventh consecutive playoff loss dating back to 2016.

On January 13, the day following the loss and the end of Pittsburgh's season, Tomlin decided to step down "after much thought and reflection." Tomlin compiled a 193–114–2 regular season record during his 19-year coaching tenure in Pittsburgh, tying him with Chuck Noll as the winningest head coach in franchise history. Tomlin also led Pittsburgh to 13 playoff appearances, 8 AFC North division titles, and the franchise's sixth Super Bowl title in Super Bowl XLIII. His win-loss record in the playoffs was 8–12.

The Pittsburgh Steelers drew an average home attendance of 67,440, the 18th-highest of all NFL teams.

== Draft ==
2025 Pittsburgh Steelers draft selections
Round	Selection	Player	Position	College	Notes
1	21	Derrick Harmon	DT	Oregon	
2	52	Traded to the Seattle Seahawks (Note: The Steelers traded their second round selection (52nd overall) and their seventh round selection (223rd overall) to the Seattle Seahawks in exchange for WR DK Metcalf and the Chicago Bears' sixth round selection (185th overall) which the Seahawks had previously acquired from the Bears in exchange for LB Darrell Taylor.)			
3	83	Kaleb Johnson	RB	Iowa	
4	123	Jack Sawyer	DE	Ohio State	
5	156	Traded to the Kansas City Chiefs (Note: The Steelers traded their fifth round selection (156th overall) to the Kansas City Chiefs in exchange for the Lions' fifth round selection (164th overall) and the Panthers' seventh round selection (226th overall), which the Chiefs had acquired in previous trades.)			
5	162	Traded to the New York Jets (Note: The Steelers traded a fifth-round selection (162nd overall) to the New York Jets in exchange for WR Mike Williams.)			From Rams (Note: The Steelers traded a sixth-round selection, a 2024 fifth-round selection and G Kevin Dotson to the Los Angeles Rams in exchange for a fifth-round selection and a 2024 fourth-round selection.)
5	164	Yahya Black	DT	Iowa	From Lions via Chiefs via Eagles via Browns
6	185	Will Howard	QB	Ohio State	From Bears via Seahawks
6	195	Traded to the Los Angeles Rams			
6	202	Traded to the Chicago Bears (Note: The Steelers traded a conditional sixth-round selection (202nd overall) to the Chicago Bears in exchange for QB Justin Fields. The condition – which would have converted the selection to a fourth-round selection if Fields played in 51% of the Steelers' snaps in 2024 – was not met.)			From Texans (Note: The Steelers traded G Kendrick Green to the Houston Texans in exchange for a sixth-round selection.)
7	223	Traded to the Seattle Seahawks			From Saints via Eagles (Note: The Steelers traded a 2024 fourth-round selection and QB Kenny Pickett to the Philadelphia Eagles in exchange for two seventh-round selections (223rd and 229th overall) and a 2024 third-round selection.)
7	226	Carson Bruener	LB	Washington	From Panthers via Chiefs
7	229	Donte Kent	CB	Central Michigan	From Falcons via Eagles
7	237	Traded to the Green Bay Packers (Note: The Steelers traded a seventh-round selection (237th overall) to the Green Bay Packers in exchange for LB Preston Smith.)			

2025 Pittsburgh Steelers undrafted free agents
Name	Position	College	Ref.
Sebastian Castro	S	Iowa	
J. J. Galbreath	TE	South Dakota	
Ben Sauls	K	Pittsburgh	
Roc Taylor	WR	Memphis	
DJ Thomas-Jones	FB	South Alabama	
Aiden Williams	OG	Minnesota Duluth	
Ke'Shawn Williams	WR	Indiana	
Max Hurleman	RB	Notre Dame	
Gareth Warren	OT	Lindenwood	
Montana Lemonious-Craig	WR	Arizona	

Draft trades

== Staff ==
2025 Pittsburgh Steelers staff
Front office: Owner/president – Art Rooney II; Vice president – Art Rooney Jr.; Vice president of player personnel – Dan Rooney Jr.; General manager – Omar Khan; Assistant general manager – Andy Weidl; Director of player scouting – Mark Sadowski; Assistant director of player scouting – Max Gruder; Director of college scouting – Dan Colbert; Director of pro scouting – Sheldon White; Director of football administration – Cole Marcoux; Director of player development – Darrel Young; Head coaches: Head coach – Mike Tomlin; Offensive coaches: Offensive coordinator – Arthur Smith; Quarterbacks – Tom Arth; Running backs – Eddie Faulkner; Wide receivers – Zach Azzanni; Tight ends – Alfredo Roberts; Offensive line – Pat Meyer; Assistant offensive line – Isaac Williams; Offensive assistant – Matt Baker; Offensive assistant – Mateo Kambui	Defensive coaches: Defensive coordinator – Teryl Austin; Defensive line – Karl Dunbar; Outside linebackers – Denzel Martin; Inside linebackers – Scott McCurley; Defensive backs – Gerald Alexander; Assistant secondary – Anthony Midget; Defensive quality control – Jason Brooks; Quality control – Luke Smith; Special teams coaches: Special teams coordinator – Danny Smith; Strength and conditioning: Head strength and conditioning – Phil Matusz; Assistant strength and conditioning – Justus Galac; Senior conditioning coordinator – Garrett Giemont; Sports science coordinator – Roderick Moore

== Final roster ==
2025 Pittsburgh Steelers roster
Quarterbacks (QB): 18 Will Howard; 8 Aaron Rodgers; 2 Mason Rudolph; Running backs (RB): 14 Kenneth Gainwell; 20 Kaleb Johnson; 30 Jaylen Warren; Wide receivers (WR): 19 Calvin Austin; 4 DK Metcalf; 13 Scotty Miller; 15 Ben Skowronek; 16 Adam Thielen; 11 Marquez Valdes-Scantling; 10 Roman Wilson; Tight ends (TE): 88 Pat Freiermuth; 83 Connor Heyward FB; 81 Jonnu Smith	Offensive linemen (OL): 74 Spencer Anderson LG; 60 Dylan Cook LT; 68 Jack Driscoll RT; 76 Troy Fautanu RT; 54 Zach Frazier C; 62 Ryan McCollum C; 66 Mason McCormick RG; 71 Andrus Peat LT; 73 Isaac Seumalo LG; Defensive linemen (DL): 95 Keeanu Benton NT; 94 Yahya Black DE; 99 Derrick Harmon DE; 97 Cameron Heyward DT; 91 Logan Lee NT; 93 Esezi Otomewo DT	Linebackers (LB): 44 Carson Bruener ILB; 50 Malik Harrison ILB; 51 Nick Herbig OLB; 56 Alex Highsmith OLB; 55 Cole Holcomb ILB; 53 Jeremiah Moon OLB; 6 Patrick Queen ILB; 33 Jack Sawyer OLB; 90 T. J. Watt OLB; 41 Payton Wilson ILB; Defensive backs (DB): 49 Sebastian Castro FS; 21 Chuck Clark SS; 29 Kyle Dugger SS; 26 Brandin Echols CB; 40 Jabrill Peppers SS; 42 James Pierre CB; 24 Joey Porter Jr. CB; 5 Jalen Ramsey FS; 22 Asante Samuel Jr. CB; Special teams (ST): 9 Chris Boswell K; 46 Christian Kuntz LS; 3 Corliss Waitman P	Practice squad: 48 Cal Adomitis LS; 65 Kyler Baugh DE; 85 Jaheim Bell TE; 23 Tre Flowers CB; 72 Anthony Goodlow DE; 31 Daequan Hardy CB; 84 Max Hurleman WR; 38 D'Shawn Jamison CB; 89 Brandon Johnson WR; 79 Steven Jones LT; 69 Doug Nester LT; 35 Lew Nichols III RB; 82 John Rhys Plumlee WR; 37 Trey Sermon RB; 87 Matt Sokol TE; 45 Julius Welschof OLB (IPP); Reserve: 67 Calvin Anderson LT (IR); 96 Daniel Ekuale NT (IR); 25 DeShon Elliott SS (IR); 77 Broderick Jones LT (IR); 34 Donte Kent CB (IR); 28 Miles Killebrew FS (IR); 92 Isaiahh Loudermilk DT (IR); 94 Dean Lowry DT (IR); 89 Donald Parham TE (IR); 64 Max Scharping RG (IR); 79 Jacob Slade DT (IR); 17 Skylar Thompson QB (IR); 27 Cory Trice CB (IR); 80 Darnell Washington TE (IR); Rookies in italics 53 active, 14 reserve, 16 practice squad

== Preseason ==
Week	Date	Opponent	Result	Record	Venue	Recap
1	August 9	at Jacksonville Jaguars	W 31–25	1–0	EverBank Stadium	Recap
2	August 16	Tampa Bay Buccaneers	L 14–17	1–1	Acrisure Stadium	Recap
3	August 21	at Carolina Panthers	W 19–10	2–1	Bank of America Stadium	Recap

== Regular season ==
=== Schedule ===
The NFL announced the NFL International Series matchups for 2025 prior to the rest of the schedule on May 13. The Steelers played the Minnesota Vikings during Week 4 on September 28 at Croke Park in Dublin, Ireland, with the Steelers serving as the home team. The remainder of the Steelers schedule was announced on May 14, 2025.

Week	Date	Opponent	Result	Record	Venue	Recap
1	September 7	at New York Jets	**W** 34–32	1–0	MetLife Stadium	Recap
2	September 14	Seattle Seahawks	**L** 17–31	1–1	Acrisure Stadium	Recap
3	September 21	at New England Patriots	**W** 21–14	2–1	Gillette Stadium	Recap
4	September 28	Minnesota Vikings	**W** 24–21	3–1	(Republic of Ireland) Croke Park (Dublin)	Recap
5	Bye					
6	October 12	**Cleveland Browns**	**W** 23–9	4–1	Acrisure Stadium	Recap
7	October 16	at **Cincinnati Bengals**	**L** 31–33	4–2	Paycor Stadium	Recap
8	October 26	Green Bay Packers	**L** 25–35	4–3	Acrisure Stadium	Recap
9	November 2	Indianapolis Colts	**W** 27–20	5–3	Acrisure Stadium	Recap
10	November 9	at Los Angeles Chargers	**L** 10–25	5–4	SoFi Stadium	Recap
11	November 16	**Cincinnati Bengals**	**W** 34–12	6–4	Acrisure Stadium	Recap
12	November 23	at Chicago Bears	**L** 28–31	6–5	Soldier Field	Recap
13	November 30	Buffalo Bills	**L** 7–26	6–6	Acrisure Stadium	Recap
14	December 7	at **Baltimore Ravens**	**W** 27–22	7–6	M&T Bank Stadium	Recap
15	December 15	Miami Dolphins	**W** 28–15	8–6	Acrisure Stadium	Recap
16	December 21	at Detroit Lions	**W** 29–24	9–6	Ford Field	Recap
17	December 28	at **Cleveland Browns**	**L** 6–13	9–7	Huntington Bank Field	Recap
18	January 4	**Baltimore Ravens**	**W** 26–24	10–7	Acrisure Stadium	Recap

Note: Intra-division opponents are in bold text.

=== Game summaries ===
==== Week 1: at New York Jets ====
Week 1: Pittsburgh Steelers at New York Jets – Game summary

Quarter	1	2	3	4	Total
**Steelers**	7	10	0	17	**34**
Jets	9	10	7	6	**32**

at MetLife Stadium, East Rutherford, New Jersey

- Date: September 7
- Game time: 1:00 p.m. EDT
- Game weather: Cloudy, 67 °F (19 °C)
- Game attendance: 83,253
- Referee: Bill Vinovich
- TV announcers (CBS): Ian Eagle, J. J. Watt and Evan Washburn
- Recap, Game Book

Game information

**First quarter**

- NYJ – Nick Folk 35-yard field goal, 9:15. Jets 3–0. **Drive: 10 plays, 48 yards, 5:45.**
- PIT – Ben Skowronek 22-yard pass from Aaron Rodgers (Chris Boswell kick), 3:38. Steelers 7–3. **Drive: 10 plays, 71 yards, 5:37.**
- NYJ – Garrett Wilson 33-yard pass from Justin Fields (run failed), 0:25. Jets 9–7. **Drive: 6 plays, 55 yards, 3:13.**

**Second quarter**

- PIT – Chris Boswell 56-yard field goal, 13:26. Steelers 10–9. **Drive: 5 plays, 35 yards, 1:59.**
- NYJ – Braelon Allen 8-yard run (Nick Folk kick), 10:03. Jets 16–10. **Drive: 7 plays, 68 yards, 3:23.**
- NYJ – Nick Folk 51-yard field goal, 2:54. Jets 19–10. **Drive: 8 plays, 41 yards, 4:53.**
- PIT – Jonnu Smith 3-yard pass from Aaron Rodgers (Chris Boswell kick), 0:32. Jets 19–17. **Drive: 9 plays, 65 yards, 2:22.**

**Third quarter**

- NYJ – Justin Fields 2-yard run (Nick Folk kick), 3:46. Jets 26–17. **Drive: 8 plays, 68 yards, 5:11.**

**Fourth quarter**

- PIT – Jaylen Warren 5-yard pass from Aaron Rodgers (Chris Boswell kick), 14:57. Jets 26–24. **Drive: 9 plays, 68 yards, 3:49.**
- PIT – Calvin Austin III 18-yard pass from Aaron Rodgers (Chris Boswell kick), 14:07. Steelers 31–26. **Drive: 2 plays, 22 yards, 0:43.**
- NYJ – Justin Fields 1-yard run (pass failed), 7:01. Jets 32–31. **Drive: 12 plays, 67 yards, 7:06.**
- PIT – Chris Boswell 60-yard field goal, 1:03. Steelers 34–32. **Drive: 6 plays, 39 yards, 2:10.**

**Top passers**

- PIT – Aaron Rodgers – 22/30, 244 yards, 4 TD
- NYJ – Justin Fields – 16/22, 218 yards, TD

**Top rushers**

- PIT – Jaylen Warren – 11 rushes, 37 yards
- NYJ – Breece Hall – 19 rushes, 107 yards

**Top receivers**

- PIT – DK Metcalf – 4 receptions, 83 yards
- NYJ – Garrett Wilson – 7 receptions, 95 yards, TD

This game was Aaron Rodgers, Brandin Echols, and Chuck Clark's return to New York. Justin Fields also faced the Steelers team he had once played for. On one hand, the Jets could not stop Rodgers in his Steelers debut, as he threw for 244 yards, 4 touchdowns, no interceptions, and completed 73.3% of his passes to go with his 136.7 passer rating. On the other hand, the defense could not stop the Jets' rushing attack, as they gave up 182 rushing yards and 3 rushing touchdowns. Rodgers became the first Steelers player to throw 4 touchdowns in a game since Ben Roethlisberger did so on January 10, 2021.

==== Week 2: vs. Seattle Seahawks ====
Week 2: Seattle Seahawks at Pittsburgh Steelers – Game summary

Quarter	1	2	3	4	Total
**Seahawks**	7	0	7	17	**31**
Steelers	6	8	0	3	**17**

at Acrisure Stadium, Pittsburgh, Pennsylvania

- Date: September 14
- Game time: 1:00 p.m. EDT
- Game weather: Sunny, 79 °F (26 °C)
- Game attendance: 66,347
- Referee: Scott Novak
- TV announcers (Fox): Adam Amin, Mark Sanchez and Kristina Pink
- Recap, Game Book

Game information

**First quarter**

- SEA – Tory Horton 21-yard pass from Sam Darnold (Jason Myers kick), 10:29. Seahawks 7–0. **Drive: 8 plays, 65 yards, 4:31.**
- PIT – Chris Boswell 48-yard field goal, 4:47. Seahawks 7–3. **Drive: 10 plays, 46 yards, 5:42.**
- PIT – Chris Boswell 48-yard field goal, 2:13. Seahawks 7–6. **Drive: 6 plays, 14 yards, 2:20.**

**Second quarter**

- PIT – DK Metcalf 2-yard pass from Aaron Rodgers (Aaron Rodgers–Darnell Washington pass), 1:09. Steelers 14–7. **Drive: 6 plays, 21 yards, 2:20.**

**Third quarter**

- SEA – AJ Barner 7-yard pass from Sam Darnold (Jason Myers kick), 6:10. Tied 14–14. **Drive: 9 plays, 80 yards, 5:01.**

**Fourth quarter**

- SEA – Jason Myers 54-yard field goal, 12:46. Seahawks 17–14. **Drive: 10 plays, 55 yards, 3:47.**
- SEA – Jason Myers 65-yard kickoff recovered in the end zone for a touchdown (Jason Myers kick), 12:46. Seahawks 24–14.
- PIT – Chris Boswell 45-yard field goal, 7:49. Seahawks 24–17. **Drive: 9 plays, 45 yards, 4:57.**
- SEA – Kenneth Walker III 19-yard run (Jason Myers kick), 3:41. Seahawks 31–17. **Drive: 7 plays, 73 yards, 4:08.**

**Top passers**

- SEA – Sam Darnold – 22/33, 295 yards, 2 TD, 2 INT
- PIT – Aaron Rodgers – 18/33, 203 yards, TD, 2 INT

**Top rushers**

- SEA – Kenneth Walker III – 13 rushes, 105 yards, TD
- PIT – Jaylen Warren – 14 rushes, 48 yards

**Top receivers**

- SEA – Jaxon Smith-Njigba – 8 receptions, 103 yards
- PIT – Jaylen Warren – 4 receptions, 86 yards

This game was Cody White's return to Pittsburgh, having played for the Steelers from 2021 to 2022. This was also DK Metcalf's first game against his former team. After a win on the road against the Jets, the Steelers lost 31–17 to the Seattle Seahawks, for their first loss to them since 2019. However, Kaleb Johnson gave the Seahawks free points in the fourth quarter when he touched the ball and let the Seahawks pick it up in the end zone.

==== Week 3: at New England Patriots ====
Week 3: Pittsburgh Steelers at New England Patriots – Game summary

Quarter	1	2	3	4	Total
**Steelers**	7	7	0	7	**21**
Patriots	0	7	0	7	**14**

at Gillette Stadium, Foxborough, Massachusetts

- Date: September 21
- Game time: 1:00 p.m. EDT
- Game weather: Cloudy, 66 °F (19 °C)
- Game attendance: 64,628
- Referee: Clete Blakeman
- TV announcers (CBS): Ian Eagle, J. J. Watt and Evan Washburn
- Recap, Game Book

Game information

**First quarter**

- PIT – Kenneth Gainwell 1-yard run (Chris Boswell kick), 8:25. Steelers 7–0. **Drive: 8 plays, 54 yards, 4:53.**

**Second quarter**

- PIT – DK Metcalf 12-yard pass from Aaron Rodgers (Chris Boswell kick), 13:49. Steelers 14–0. **Drive: 12 plays, 90 yards, 6:23.**
- NE – Hunter Henry 5-yard pass from Drake Maye (Andrés Borregales kick), 9:01. Steelers 14–7. **Drive: 9 plays, 77 yards, 4:48.**

**Third quarter**

- No scoring plays

**Fourth quarter**

- NE – Hunter Henry 16-yard pass from Drake Maye (Andrés Borregales kick), 14:56. Tied 14–14. **Drive: 15 plays, 88 yards, 8:44.**
- PIT – Calvin Austin III 17-yard pass from Aaron Rodgers (Chris Boswell kick), 2:16. Steelers 21–14. **Drive: 9 plays, 62 yards, 5:25.**

**Top passers**

- PIT – Aaron Rodgers – 16/23, 139 yards, 2 TD, INT
- NE – Drake Maye – 28/37, 268 yards, 2 TD, INT

**Top rushers**

- PIT – Jaylen Warren – 18 rushes, 47 yards
- NE – Drake Maye – 7 rushes, 45 yards

**Top receivers**

- PIT – Calvin Austin III – 3 receptions, 34 yards, TD
- NE – Hunter Henry – 8 receptions, 90 yards, 2 TD

After a tough loss in their home opener against the Seahawks, the Steelers travelled to Foxborough to face the New England Patriots. The Steelers began to heat up in the first half, going up 14–0 with a Kenneth Gainwell touchdown run, and Aaron Rodgers throwing a score to DK Metcalf. The Patriots then began to pick up steam, with Drake Maye throwing two scores to Hunter Henry, tying the game at 14. The Steelers ended the game when Aaron Rodgers threw a go-ahead touchdown to Calvin Austin III in the game's final minutes. The Steelers defense also forced five turnovers with Brandin Echols ending the first half with an interception and four fumbles in that same game. Aaron Rodgers improved on his performance from the previous game by throwing 139 yards, 2 touchdowns, 1 interception, and completing 69.6% of his passes with a 96.1 passer rating. With their first win over the Patriots since 2018, the Steelers improved to 2–1. It was their first win in New England since their Super Bowl XLIII-winning 2008 season. It was also their first victory against the Patriots after the Brady–Belichick era.

==== Week 4: vs. Minnesota Vikings ====
NFL International Series

Week 4: Minnesota Vikings at Pittsburgh Steelers – Game summary

Quarter	1	2	3	4	Total
Vikings	3	3	0	15	**21**
**Steelers**	7	7	7	3	**24**

at Croke Park, Dublin, Ireland

- Date: September 28
- Game time: 2:30 p.m. IST/9:30 a.m. EDT
- Game weather: Mostly cloudy, 61 °F (16 °C)
- Game attendance: 74,512
- Referee: Brad Allen
- TV announcers (WTAE/NFLN): Joe Davis, Greg Olsen, Pam Oliver and Jamie Erdahl
- Recap, Game Book

Game information

**First quarter**

- MIN – Will Reichard 41-yard field goal, 6:24. Vikings 3–0. **Drive: 11 plays, 51 yards, 6:25.**
- PIT – Kenneth Gainwell 1-yard run (Chris Boswell kick), 0:55. Steelers 7–3. **Drive: 9 plays, 71 yards, 5:29.**

**Second quarter**

- PIT – DK Metcalf 80-yard pass from Aaron Rodgers (Chris Boswell kick), 12:16. Steelers 14–3. **Drive: 1 play, 80 yards, 0:12.**
- MIN – Will Reichard 28-yard field goal, 0:12. Steelers 14–6. **Drive: 9 plays, 81 yards, 1:26.**

**Third quarter**

- PIT – Kenneth Gainwell 4-yard run (Chris Boswell kick), 2:23. Steelers 21–6. **Drive: 5 plays, 35 yards, 2:52.**

**Fourth quarter**

- PIT – Chris Boswell 33-yard field goal, 11:18. Steelers 24–6. **Drive: 8 plays, 31 yards, 4:17.**
- MIN – Zavier Scott 16-yard pass from Carson Wentz (Carson Wentz–Jalen Nailor pass), 7:50. Steelers 24–14. **Drive: 9 plays, 70 yards, 3:28.**
- MIN – Jalen Nailor 2-yard pass from Carson Wentz (Will Reichard kick), 2:08. Steelers 24–21. **Drive: 7 plays, 99 yards, 2:01.**

**Top passers**

- MIN – Carson Wentz – 30/44, 349 yards, 2 TD, 2 INT
- PIT – Aaron Rodgers – 18/22, 200 yards, TD

**Top rushers**

- MIN – Jordan Mason – 16 rushes, 57 yards
- PIT – Kenneth Gainwell – 19 rushes, 99 yards, 2 TD

**Top receivers**

- MIN – Justin Jefferson – 10 receptions, 126 yards
- PIT – DK Metcalf – 5 receptions, 126 yards, TD

After a closely-contested win against the Patriots, the Steelers traveled to Croke Park for a "home" game against the Carson Wentz-led Minnesota Vikings. This was the first NFL game played in Ireland. After the Steelers' first drive ended in a punt, the Vikings drew first blood with a 41-yard field goal from Will Reichard. The Steelers took the lead back with a 9-play, 71-yard drive that ended in a Kenneth Gainwell 1-yard touchdown run to go up 7-3 in the first quarter, and would keep the Vikings from scoring in their next two drives. The Steelers pushed their lead up to 14–3 with a 80-yard touchdown pass from Aaron Rodgers to DK Metcalf in the span of one play. Towards the end of the first half, a 30-yard field goal attempt from the Steelers was a failure, as Isaiah Rodgers blocked it. Then, Will Reichard booted a 28-yard field goal to trim Minnesota's deficit to 14–6, which would be the score at halftime. To start the third quarter, both the Vikings and Steelers traded three-and-outs. Carson Wentz threw an interception to Steelers linebacker TJ Watt, which the Steelers used as a springboard to go up 24–6, with Kenneth Gainwell finding the end zone a second time, and Chris Boswell booting a 33-yard field goal. But then, the Vikings began to heat up, as they scored a touchdown on their next two possessions, and came up with a goal-line stand. But, the game ended for good when DeShon Elliott defended a Carson Wentz pass intended for Jordan Addison with 14 seconds to go at the Vikings' 32-yard line, making the final score 24–21 in favor of the Steelers.

The Steelers improved to 3–1 with the victory. Aaron Rodgers went 18-for-22 with 200 yards and a touchdown, and posted a passer rating of 119.7, his second game with a 3-digit passer rating in four weeks. The Steelers scored 96 points through their first 4 games, their most since they scored 118 in their first 4 games in 2020.

==== Week 6: vs. Cleveland Browns ====
Week 6: Cleveland Browns at Pittsburgh Steelers – Game summary

Quarter	1	2	3	4	Total
Browns	0	3	3	3	**9**
**Steelers**	3	6	7	7	**23**

at Acrisure Stadium, Pittsburgh, Pennsylvania

- Date: October 12
- Game time: 1:00 p.m. EDT
- Game weather: Cloudy, 64 °F (18 °C)
- Game attendance: 66,738
- Referee: Ron Torbert
- TV announcers (CBS): Ian Eagle, J. J. Watt and Evan Washburn
- Recap, Game Book

Game information

**First quarter**

- PIT – Chris Boswell 44-yard field goal, 10:55. Steelers 3–0. **Drive: 8 plays, 46 yards, 4:05.**

**Second quarter**

- PIT – Chris Boswell 50-yard field goal, 11:01. Steelers 6–0. **Drive: 11 plays, 39 yards, 4:05.**
- PIT – Chris Boswell 48-yard field goal, 3:38. Steelers 9–0. **Drive: 10 plays, 49 yards, 5:19.**
- CLE – Andre Szmyt 31-yard field goal, 0:00. Steelers 9–3. **Drive: 16 plays, 72 yards, 3:38.**

**Third quarter**

- PIT – Connor Heyward 12-yard pass from Aaron Rodgers (Chris Boswell kick), 7:46. Steelers 16–3. **Drive: 10 plays, 79 yards, 6:02.**
- CLE – Andre Szmyt 53-yard field goal, 4:08. Steelers 16–6. **Drive: 9 plays, 34 yards, 3:38.**

**Fourth quarter**

- PIT – DK Metcalf 25-yard pass from Aaron Rodgers (Chris Boswell kick), 14:55. Steelers 23–6. **Drive: 7 plays, 73 yards, 4:13.**
- CLE – Andre Szmyt 32-yard field goal, 9:29. Steelers 23–9. **Drive: 18 plays, 54 yards, 5:26.**

**Top passers**

- CLE – Dillon Gabriel – 29/52, 221 yards
- PIT – Aaron Rodgers – 21/30, 235 yards, 2 TD

**Top rushers**

- CLE – Quinshon Judkins – 12 rushes, 36 yards
- PIT – Jaylen Warren – 11 rushes, 52 yards

**Top receivers**

- CLE – Harold Fannin Jr. – 7 receptions, 81 yards
- PIT – DK Metcalf – 4 receptions, 95 yards, TD

After a closely-contested win against the Vikings, the Steelers went back to Acrisure Stadium for their obligatory annual home game against the Browns. In a 23-9 win, the Steeler defense held Browns rookie quarterback Dillon Gabriel down, as he threw for 221 yards, a 55.8 completion percentage, a 66.3 passer rating, and the Browns failed to score a single touchdown. The Steeler defense also sacked Gabriel six times for 38 yards. Aaron Rodgers posted a triple-digit passer rating (115.3) for the second consecutive week, going 21-for-30 with 235 yards, 2 scores, and no picks.

With the win, the Steelers improved to 4–1 and extended their winning streak to three games, and their regular season winning streak against the Browns at home to 22 games.

==== Week 7: at Cincinnati Bengals ====
Week 7: Pittsburgh Steelers at Cincinnati Bengals – Game summary

Quarter	1	2	3	4	Total
Steelers	7	3	7	14	**31**
**Bengals**	0	17	3	13	**33**

at Paycor Stadium, Cincinnati, Ohio

- Date: October 16
- Game time: 8:15 p.m. EDT
- Game weather: Clear, 60 °F (16 °C)
- Game attendance: 66,569
- Referee: Clay Martin
- TV announcers (WTAE/Prime Video): Al Michaels, Kirk Herbstreit and Kaylee Hartung
- Recap, Game Book

Game information

**First quarter**

- PIT – Jonnu Smith 10-yard pass from Aaron Rodgers (Chris Boswell kick), 10:51. Steelers 7–0. **Drive: 8 plays, 69 yards, 4:09.**

**Second quarter**

- PIT – Chris Boswell 41-yard field goal, 10:26. Steelers 10–0. **Drive: 12 plays, 51 yards, 7:19.**
- CIN – Ja'Marr Chase 8-yard pass from Joe Flacco (Evan McPherson kick), 4:38. Steelers 10–7. **Drive: 10 plays, 72 yards, 5:48.**
- CIN – Tee Higgins 29-yard pass from Joe Flacco (Evan McPherson kick), 2:52. Bengals 14–10. **Drive: 3 plays, 76 yards, 1:33.**
- CIN – Evan McPherson 49-yard field goal, 0:00. Bengals 17–10. **Drive: 6 plays, 39 yards, 0:40.**

**Third quarter**

- CIN – Evan McPherson 23-yard field goal, 7:55. Bengals 20–10. **Drive: 14 plays, 63 yards, 7:05.**
- PIT – Pat Freiermuth 19-yard pass from Aaron Rodgers (Chris Boswell kick), 3:55. Bengals 20–17. **Drive: 9 plays, 61 yards, 4:00.**

**Fourth quarter**

- CIN – Noah Fant 5-yard pass from Joe Flacco (Evan McPherson kick), 14:57. Bengals 27–17. **Drive: 8 plays, 67 yards, 3:58.**
- PIT – Darnell Washington 2-yard pass from Aaron Rodgers (Chris Boswell kick), 11:03. Bengals 27–24. **Drive: 7 plays, 73 yards, 3:54.**
- CIN – Evan McPherson 45-yard field goal, 6:58. Bengals 30–24. **Drive: 9 plays, 53 yards, 4:05.**
- PIT – Pat Freiermuth 68-yard pass from Aaron Rodgers (Chris Boswell kick), 2:21. Steelers 31–30. **Drive: 2 plays, 58 yards, 0:25.**
- CIN – Evan McPherson 36-yard field goal, 0:07. Bengals 33–31. **Drive: 8 plays, 52 yards, 2:14.**

**Top passers**

- PIT – Aaron Rodgers – 23/34, 249 yards, 4 TD, 2 INT
- CIN – Joe Flacco – 31/47, 342 yards, 3 TD

**Top rushers**

- PIT – Jaylen Warren – 16 rushes, 127 yards
- CIN – Chase Brown – 11 rushes, 108 yards

**Top receivers**

- PIT – Pat Freiermuth – 5 receptions, 111 yards, 2 TD
- CIN – Ja'Marr Chase – 16 receptions, 161 yards, TD

The Steelers blew a 10–0 lead in the second quarter and lost to Joe Flacco and the Cincinnati Bengals, 33–31, on a 36–yard field goal by Evan McPherson and an incomplete Hail Mary from Aaron Rodgers. The Steelers fell to 4–2. They once again failed to beat an AFC North team on a Thursday, not having done so since they beat the Browns 14–3 at home on Thursday, December 8, 2011. Aaron Rodgers posted a triple-digit passer rating (103.7) for the third consecutive week by throwing 249 yards, 4 touchdowns, 2 interceptions, and completed 67.6 percent of his passes.

==== Week 8: vs. Green Bay Packers ====
Week 8: Green Bay Packers at Pittsburgh Steelers – Game summary

Quarter	1	2	3	4	Total
**Packers**	7	0	7	21	**35**
Steelers	3	13	3	6	**25**

at Acrisure Stadium, Pittsburgh, Pennsylvania

- Date: October 26
- Game time: 8:20 p.m. EDT
- Game weather: Clear, 46 °F (8 °C)
- Game attendance: 67,386
- Referee: Shawn Hochuli
- TV announcers (NBC): Mike Tirico, Cris Collinsworth and Melissa Stark
- Recap, Game Book

Game information

**First quarter**

- PIT – Chris Boswell 56-yard field goal, 8:41. Steelers 3–0. **Drive: 7 plays, 42 yards, 4:45.**
- GB – Tucker Kraft 16-yard pass from Jordan Love (Brandon McManus kick), 5:05. Packers 7–3. **Drive: 6 plays, 67 yards, 3:36.**

**Second quarter**

- PIT – Chris Boswell 50-yard field goal, 12:18. Packers 7–6. **Drive: 6 plays, 21 yards, 2:32.**
- PIT – Chris Boswell 48-yard field goal, 5:52. Steelers 9–7. **Drive: 9 plays, 35 yards, 5:14.**
- PIT – DK Metcalf 2-yard pass from Aaron Rodgers (Chris Boswell kick), 0:34. Steelers 16–7. **Drive: 9 plays, 84 yards, 3:32.**

**Third quarter**

- GB – Savion Williams 8-yard pass from Jordan Love (Brandon McManus kick), 8:48. Steelers 16–14. **Drive: 9 plays, 90 yards, 5:13.**
- PIT – Chris Boswell 56-yard field goal, 5:34. Steelers 19–14. **Drive: 7 plays, 39 yards, 3:14.**

**Fourth quarter**

- GB – Josh Jacobs 3-yard run (Jordan Love–Romeo Doubs pass), 14:55. Packers 22–19. **Drive: 10 plays, 78 yards, 5:39.**
- GB – Tucker Kraft 24-yard pass from Jordan Love (Brandon McManus kick), 10:57. Packers 29–19. **Drive: 4 plays, 45 yards, 2:01.**
- GB – Brandon McManus 28-yard field goal, 5:28. Packers 32–19. **Drive: 8 plays, 47 yards, 3:28.**
- GB – Brandon McManus 25-yard field goal, 3:59. Packers 35–19. **Drive: 5 plays, 19 yards, 1:08.**
- PIT – Roman Wilson 21-yard pass from Aaron Rodgers (pass failed), 2:07. Packers 35–25. **Drive: 9 plays, 70 yards, 1:52.**

**Top passers**

- GB – Jordan Love – 29/37, 360 yards, 3 TD
- PIT – Aaron Rodgers – 24/36, 219 yards, 2 TD

**Top rushers**

- GB – Emanuel Wilson – 11 rushes, 61 yards
- PIT – Jaylen Warren – 13 rushes, 62 yards

**Top receivers**

- GB – Tucker Kraft – 7 receptions, 143 yards, 2 TD
- PIT – Roman Wilson – 4 receptions, 74 yards, TD

Aaron Rodgers faced his former team, the Green Bay Packers, for the first time since he was traded in 2023. Rodgers and the Steelers were unable to keep pace with Packers quarterback Jordan Love, who had spent three seasons as Rodgers’ backup in Green Bay. Love passed for 360 yards and three touchdowns as the Steelers lost at home.

The loss ended the Steelers' six-game home winning streak against the Packers and marked their first home loss to them since the 1970 season. The loss also prevented Rodgers from becoming the fifth quarterback in NFL history to defeat all 32 teams. Despite Aaron Rodgers posting a triple digit passer rating for the fourth consecutive week at 101.5 (219 yards, 2 scores, 66.7 completion percentage), he could not succeed at helping the Steelers win.

==== Week 9: vs. Indianapolis Colts ====
Week 9: Indianapolis Colts at Pittsburgh Steelers – Game summary

Quarter	1	2	3	4	Total
Colts	7	0	0	13	**20**
**Steelers**	0	17	0	10	**27**

at Acrisure Stadium, Pittsburgh, Pennsylvania

- Date: November 2
- Game time: 1:00 p.m. EST
- Game weather: Cloudy, 56 °F (13 °C)
- Game attendance: 66,677
- Referee: Craig Wrolstad
- TV announcers (CBS): Ian Eagle, J. J. Watt and Evan Washburn
- Recap, Game Book

Game information

**First quarter**

- IND – Daniel Jones 1-yard run (Michael Badgley kick), 8:05. Colts 7–0. **Drive: 13 plays, 79 yards, 5:16.**

**Second quarter**

- PIT – Jaylen Warren 1-yard run (Chris Boswell kick), 6:09. Tied 7–7. **Drive: 12 plays, 56 yards, 5:12.**
- PIT – Pat Freiermuth 12-yard pass from Aaron Rodgers (Chris Boswell kick), 4:22. Steelers 14–7. **Drive: 2 plays, 14 yards, 0:50.**
- PIT – Chris Boswell 25-yard field goal, 0:00. Steelers 17–7. **Drive: 12 plays, 75 yards, 3:19.**

**Third quarter**

- No scoring plays

**Fourth quarter**

- PIT – Jaylen Warren 2-yard run (Chris Boswell kick), 14:16. Steelers 24–7. **Drive: 7 plays, 56 yards, 3:53.**
- IND – Michael Badgley 52-yard field goal, 10:45. Steelers 24–10. **Drive: 8 plays, 42 yards, 3:31.**
- PIT – Chris Boswell 46-yard field goal, 6:51. Steelers 27–10. **Drive: 6 plays, 6 yards, 1:07.**
- IND – Josh Downs 4-yard pass from Daniel Jones (Michael Badgley kick), 4:30. Steelers 27–17. **Drive: 9 plays, 76 yards, 2:21.**
- IND – Michael Badgley 53-yard field goal, 0:09. Steelers 27–20. **Drive: 7 plays, 53 yards, 0:52.**

**Top passers**

- IND – Daniel Jones – 31/50, 342 yards, TD, 3 INT
- PIT – Aaron Rodgers – 25/35, 203 yards, TD

**Top rushers**

- IND – Jonathan Taylor – 14 rushes, 45 yards
- PIT – Jaylen Warren – 16 rushes, 31 yards, 2 TD

**Top receivers**

- IND – Michael Pittman Jr. – 9 receptions, 115 yards
- PIT – Calvin Austin III – 5 receptions, 56 yards

The Steelers' defense, the highest-paid unit in the NFL, rebounded after several subpar performances by forcing six turnovers and sacking Indianapolis Colts quarterback Daniel Jones five times. The Steelers limited the league’s top-ranked offense to 20 points and held running back Jonathan Taylor to a season-low 45 yards on 14 carries. With the win, Pittsburgh improved to 5–3 and extended its home winning streak against the Colts to five games, having not lost to them at home since their Super Bowl XLIII-winning 2008 season.

==== Week 10: at Los Angeles Chargers ====
Week 10: Pittsburgh Steelers at Los Angeles Chargers – Game summary

Quarter	1	2	3	4	Total
Steelers	3	0	0	7	**10**
**Chargers**	2	10	3	10	**25**

at SoFi Stadium, Inglewood, California

- Date: November 9
- Game time: 8:20 p.m. EST/5:20 p.m. PST
- Game weather: Clear, 70 °F (21 °C) (fixed roof)
- Game attendance: 72,174
- Referee: Brad Rogers
- TV announcers (NBC): Mike Tirico, Cris Collinsworth and Melissa Stark
- Recap, Game Book

Game information

**First quarter**

- PIT – Chris Boswell 59-yard field goal, 10:25. Steelers 3–0. **Drive: 4 plays, 5 yards, 1:39.**
- LAC – Aaron Rodgers sacked in the end zone for a safety, 5:09. Steelers 3–2.

**Second quarter**

- LAC – Cameron Dicker 32-yard field goal, 7:32. Chargers 5–3. **Drive: 13 plays, 51 yards, 5:38.**
- LAC – Ladd McConkey 15-yard pass from Justin Herbert (Cameron Dicker kick), 0:12. Chargers 12–3. **Drive: 7 plays, 38 yards, 1:57.**

**Third quarter**

- LAC – Cameron Dicker 59-yard field goal, 6:07. Chargers 15–3. **Drive: 6 plays, 36 yards, 2:32.**

**Fourth quarter**

- LAC – Kimani Vidal 2-yard run (Cameron Dicker kick), 9:26. Chargers 22–3. **Drive: 6 plays, 90 yards, 3:15.**
- LAC – Cameron Dicker 42-yard field goal, 4:54. Chargers 25–3. **Drive: 4 plays, -3 yards, 1:31.**
- PIT – Roman Wilson 27-yard pass from Aaron Rodgers (Chris Boswell kick), 2:57. Chargers 25–10. **Drive: 8 plays, 65 yards, 1:57.**

**Top passers**

- PIT – Aaron Rodgers – 16/31, 161 yards, TD, 2 INT
- LAC – Justin Herbert – 20/33, 220 yards, TD

**Top rushers**

- PIT – Jaylen Warren – 14 rushes, 70 yards
- LAC – Kimani Vidal – 25 rushes, 95 yards, TD

**Top receivers**

- PIT – Roman Wilson – 2 receptions, 35 yards, TD
- LAC – Ladd McConkey – 4 receptions, 107 yards, TD

With a horrendous loss, even with the defense playing good, the Steelers fell to 5–4. They once again failed to beat the Chargers on the road, not having done so since 2019. Aaron Rodgers had an extremely poor performance by throwing 161 yards, 1 touchdown, 2 interceptions, and completed just 51.6 percent of his passes to go with his 50.6 passer rating.

==== Week 11: vs. Cincinnati Bengals ====
Week 11: Cincinnati Bengals at Pittsburgh Steelers – Game summary

Quarter	1	2	3	4	Total
Bengals	6	0	3	3	**12**
**Steelers**	7	3	10	14	**34**

at Acrisure Stadium, Pittsburgh, Pennsylvania

- Date: November 16
- Game time: 1:00 p.m. EST
- Game weather: Partly cloudy, 46 °F (8 °C)
- Game attendance: 66,132
- Referee: Bill Vinovich
- TV announcers (CBS): Kevin Harlan, Trent Green and Melanie Collins
- Recap, Game Book

Game information

**First quarter**

- PIT – Kenneth Gainwell 11-yard pass from Aaron Rodgers (Chris Boswell kick), 10:12. Steelers 7–0. **Drive: 8 plays, 78 yards, 4:48.**
- CIN – Tee Higgins 28-yard pass from Joe Flacco (run failed), 5:10. Steelers 7–6. **Drive: 9 plays, 71 yards, 5:02.**

**Second quarter**

- PIT – Chris Boswell 25-yard field goal, 0:25. Steelers 10–6. **Drive: 9 plays, 86 yards, 1:41.**

**Third quarter**

- CIN – Evan McPherson 43-yard field goal, 11:53. Steelers 10–9. **Drive: 7 plays, 51 yards, 3:07.**
- PIT – Chris Boswell 30-yard field goal, 4:16. Steelers 13–9. **Drive: 15 plays, 61 yards, 7:37.**
- PIT – Kyle Dugger 73-yard interception return (Chris Boswell kick), 0:37. Steelers 20–9.

**Fourth quarter**

- CIN – Evan McPherson 48-yard field goal, 9:41. Steelers 20–12. **Drive: 12 plays, 47 yards, 5:56.**
- PIT – Kenneth Gainwell 5-yard pass from Mason Rudolph (Chris Boswell kick), 3:40. Steelers 27–12. **Drive: 12 plays, 65 yards, 6:01.**
- PIT – James Pierre 34-yard fumble recovery (Chris Boswell kick), 3:22. Steelers 34–12.

**Top passers**

- CIN – Joe Flacco – 23/40, 199 yards, TD, INT
- PIT – Mason Rudolph – 12/16, 127 yards, TD

**Top rushers**

- CIN – Chase Brown – 18 rushes, 99 yards
- PIT – Jaylen Warren – 10 rushes, 62 yards

**Top receivers**

- CIN – Tee Higgins – 3 receptions, 63 yards, TD
- PIT – Kenneth Gainwell – 7 receptions, 81 yards, 2 TD

With the win, the Steelers improved to 6–4 and 2–1 against the AFC North. Aaron Rodgers returned to a triple-digit passer rating (106.5) by throwing 116 yards, a touchdown, no interceptions, and completed 60 percent of his passes. He did, however, fracture his left wrist sometime in the second quarter, leaving Mason Rudolph to take his position in the second half. Rudolph was no slouch, either, as he performed a tad better than Rodgers by throwing 127 yards, 1 touchdown, no interceptions, and completed 75 percent of his passes to go with his 118.5 passer rating. Kyle Dugger and James Pierre became the first pair of Steelers to score both a pick-six and a fumble-six in the same game since Alex Highsmith and T.J. Watt did so on September 18, 2023, when they beat the Browns 26–22 at Acrisure Stadium.

During the game, Ja'Marr Chase reportedly spat on Jalen Ramsey, who retaliated by punching Chase and was ejected shortly afterward. Chase denied spitting on Ramsey after the game and was suspended for one game the following day. Chase attempted to appeal his suspension, but the NFL denied his appeal. Ramsey was later fined $14,491 for punching Chase. Chase later apologized after the incident.

==== Week 12: at Chicago Bears ====
Week 12: Pittsburgh Steelers at Chicago Bears – Game summary

Quarter	1	2	3	4	Total
Steelers	7	14	0	7	**28**
**Bears**	7	10	7	7	**31**

at Soldier Field, Chicago, Illinois

- Date: November 23
- Game time: 1:00 p.m. EST/12:00 p.m. CST
- Game weather: Sunny, 51 °F (11 °C)
- Game attendance: 59,658
- Referee: John Hussey
- TV announcers (CBS): Ian Eagle, J. J. Watt and Evan Washburn
- Recap, Game Book

Game information

**First quarter**

- CHI – D. J. Moore 5-yard pass from Caleb Williams (Cairo Santos kick), 8:28. Bears 7–0. **Drive: 8 plays, 56 yards, 4:07.**
- PIT – DK Metcalf 6-yard run (Chris Boswell kick), 0:30. Tied 7–7. **Drive: 13 plays, 95 yards, 7:58.**

**Second quarter**

- PIT – Nick Herbig 0-yard fumble recovery (Chris Boswell kick), 14:44. Steelers 14–7.
- CHI – Colston Loveland 12-yard pass from Caleb Williams (Cairo Santos kick), 3:56. Tied 14–14. **Drive: 11 plays, 70 yards, 4:50.**
- PIT – Jaylen Warren 1-yard run (Chris Boswell kick), 1:19. Steelers 21–14. **Drive: 7 plays, 80 yards, 2:37.**
- CHI – Cairo Santos 47-yard field goal, 0:00. Steelers 21–17. **Drive: 9 plays, 35 yards, 1:19.**

**Third quarter**

- CHI – D. J. Moore 25-yard pass from Caleb Williams (Cairo Santos kick), 8:29. Bears 24–21. **Drive: 5 plays, 60 yards, 2:47.**

**Fourth quarter**

- CHI – Kyle Monangai 2-yard run (Cairo Santos kick), 14:14. Bears 31–21. **Drive: 9 plays, 54 yards, 4:38.**
- PIT – Pat Freiermuth 3-yard pass from Mason Rudolph (Chris Boswell kick), 6:27. Bears 31–28. **Drive: 17 plays, 73 yards, 7:47.**

**Top passers**

- PIT – Mason Rudolph – 24/31, 171 yards, TD, INT
- CHI – Caleb Williams – 19/35, 239 yards, 3 TD

**Top rushers**

- PIT – Kenneth Gainwell – 10 rushes, 92 yards
- CHI – Kyle Monangai – 12 rushes, 48 yards, TD

**Top receivers**

- PIT – Calvin Austin III – 4 receptions, 36 yards
- CHI – D. J. Moore – 5 receptions, 64 yards, 2 TD

Mason Rudolph started this game for the Steelers because of Aaron Rodgers' bad wrist, making this the seventh consecutive season where the Steelers would start multiple quarterbacks. The Steelers had an extremely disappointing game against the Caleb Williams-led Chicago Bears, as they were defeated with a loss of 31–28. With the loss, the Steelers fell to 6–5. They also once again failed to beat the Bears on the road, not having done so since 1995.

A few days after the game, Steelers player Daniel Ekuale was suspended for 5 games for violating the NFL's performance-enhancing substance policy.

Despite the loss, one of the few bright spots for the Steelers was when T.J. Watt recorded the 115th sack of his NFL career, overtaking his brother J. J. Watt at 114.5, with his family in attendance. Coincidentally, J. J. Watt was also one of the TV announcers for this game and reacted accordingly.

==== Week 13: vs. Buffalo Bills ====
Week 13: Buffalo Bills at Pittsburgh Steelers – Game summary

Quarter	1	2	3	4	Total
**Bills**	0	3	13	10	**26**
Steelers	0	7	0	0	**7**

at Acrisure Stadium, Pittsburgh, Pennsylvania

- Date: November 30
- Game time: 4:25 p.m. EST
- Game weather: Cloudy, 34 °F (1 °C)
- Game attendance: 66,068
- Referee: Alex Kemp
- TV announcers (CBS): Jim Nantz, Tony Romo and Tracy Wolfson
- Recap, Game Book

Game information

**First quarter**

- No scoring plays

**Second quarter**

- PIT – Jaylen Warren 1-yard run (Chris Boswell kick), 8:09. Steelers 7–0. **Drive: 6 plays, 39 yards, 2:23.**
- BUF – Matt Prater 27-yard field goal, 0:51. Steelers 7–3. **Drive: 16 plays, 60 yards, 7:18.**

**Third quarter**

- BUF – Christian Benford 17-yard fumble recovery (Matt Prater kick), 14:44. Bills 10–7.
- BUF – Keon Coleman 1-yard pass from Josh Allen (kick failed), 8:49. Bills 16–7. **Drive: 8 plays, 56 yards, 4:27.**

**Fourth quarter**

- BUF – Josh Allen 8-yard run (Matt Prater kick), 14:08. Bills 23–7. **Drive: 15 plays, 83 yards, 8:14.**
- BUF – Matt Prater 37-yard field goal, 1:07. Bills 26–7. **Drive: 14 plays, 72 yards, 9:04.**

**Top passers**

- BUF – Josh Allen – 15/23, 123 yards, TD, INT
- PIT – Aaron Rodgers – 10/21, 117 yards

**Top rushers**

- BUF – James Cook – 32 rushes, 144 yards
- PIT – Jaylen Warren – 10 rushes, 35 yards, TD

**Top receivers**

- BUF – James Cook – 3 receptions, 33 yards
- PIT – Darnell Washington – 2 receptions, 45 yards

The Steelers’ defense was dominated by Buffalo’s run game, as the Bills rushed for 249 yards in a blowout loss for Pittsburgh. The 249 rushing yards are the most ever allowed by an opponent at Acrisure Stadium and mark the Steelers’ worst defensive performance against the run since the 1975 season.

During the game, Steelers fans booed the song Renegade and chanted for Mike Tomlin to be fired.

==== Week 14: at Baltimore Ravens ====
Week 14: Pittsburgh Steelers at Baltimore Ravens – Game summary

Quarter	1	2	3	4	Total
**Steelers**	7	10	10	0	**27**
Ravens	3	6	7	6	**22**

at M&T Bank Stadium, Baltimore, Maryland

- Date: December 7
- Game time: 1:00 p.m. EST
- Game weather: Cloudy, 44 °F (7 °C)
- Game attendance: 70,544
- Referee: Alex Moore
- TV announcers (CBS): Jim Nantz, Tony Romo and Tracy Wolfson
- Recap, Game Book

Game information

**First quarter**

- BAL – Tyler Loop 36-yard field goal, 10:58. Ravens 3–0. **Drive: 9 plays, 55 yards, 4:02.**
- PIT – Aaron Rodgers 1-yard run (Chris Boswell kick), 7:13. Steelers 7–3. **Drive: 8 plays, 65 yards, 3:45.**

**Second quarter**

- PIT – Chris Boswell 23-yard field goal, 10:39. Steelers 10–3. **Drive: 12 plays, 75 yards, 4:46.**
- PIT – Kenneth Gainwell 6-yard run (Chris Boswell kick), 6:05. Steelers 17–3. **Drive: 6 plays, 36 yards, 3:16.**
- BAL – Lamar Jackson 6-yard run (kick failed), 0:16. Steelers 17–9. **Drive: 13 plays, 60 yards, 5:49.**

**Third quarter**

- PIT – Chris Boswell 28-yard field goal, 10:57. Steelers 20–9. **Drive: 8 plays, 50 yards, 4:03.**
- BAL – Isaiah Likely 4-yard pass from Lamar Jackson (Tyler Loop kick), 7:35. Steelers 20–16. **Drive: 6 plays, 71 yards, 3:22.**
- PIT – Jaylen Warren 38-yard pass from Aaron Rodgers (Chris Boswell kick), 3:30. Steelers 27–22. **Drive: 6 plays, 80 yards, 4:05.**

**Fourth quarter**

- BAL – Tyler Loop 28-yard field goal, 13:43. Steelers 27–19. **Drive: 10 plays, 54 yards, 4:47.**
- BAL – Tyler Loop 36-yard field goal, 7:10. Steelers 27–22. **Drive: 9 plays, 50 yards, 4:09.**

**Top passers**

- PIT – Aaron Rodgers – 23/34, 284 yards, TD
- BAL – Lamar Jackson – 19/35, 219 yards, TD, INT

**Top rushers**

- PIT – Kenneth Gainwell – 4 rushes, 15 yards, TD
- BAL – Derrick Henry – 25 rushes, 94 yards

**Top receivers**

- PIT – DK Metcalf – 7 receptions, 148 yards
- BAL – Zay Flowers – 8 receptions, 124 yards

A controversial moment occurred when Ravens tight end Isaiah Likely caught a pass from Ravens quarterback Lamar Jackson with both hands in the end zone, with both feet down. As he was about to take another step with his right foot, Joey Porter Jr. knocked the ball free. The play was initially ruled a touchdown but was later overturned to an incomplete pass. The Ravens eventually turned the ball over on downs.

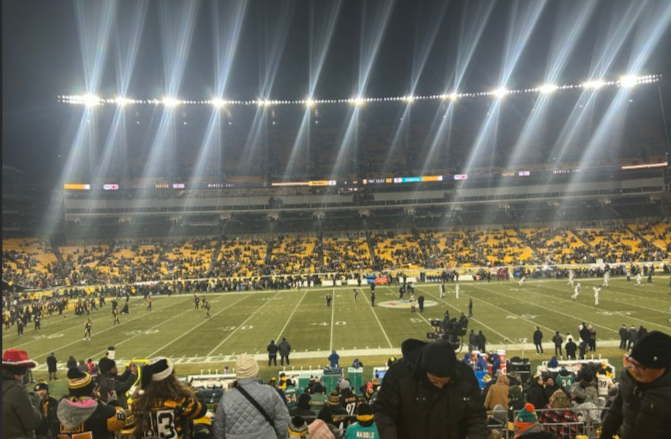
Steelers vs. Dolphins

==== Week 15: vs. Miami Dolphins ====
Week 15: Miami Dolphins at Pittsburgh Steelers – Game summary

Quarter	1	2	3	4	Total
Dolphins	0	3	0	12	**15**
**Steelers**	0	7	14	7	**28**

at Acrisure Stadium, Pittsburgh, Pennsylvania

- Date: December 15
- Game time: 8:15 p.m. EST
- Game weather: Cloudy, 17 °F (−8 °C)
- Game attendance: 65,663
- Referee: Land Clark
- TV announcers (WTAE/ESPN): Joe Buck, Troy Aikman, Lisa Salters and Laura Rutledge
- Recap, Game Book

Game information

**First quarter**

- No scoring plays

**Second quarter**

- MIA – Riley Patterson 54-yard field goal, 5:11. Dolphins 3–0. **Drive: 7 plays, 33 yards, 3:24.**
- PIT – Connor Heyward 1-yard run (Chris Boswell kick), 0:17. Steelers 7–3. **Drive: 12 plays, 60 yards, 4:54.**

**Third quarter**

- PIT – Marquez Valdes-Scantling 19-yard pass from Aaron Rodgers (Chris Boswell kick), 11:20. Steelers 14–3. **Drive: 6 plays, 71 yards, 3:40.**
- PIT – DK Metcalf 28-yard pass from Aaron Rodgers (Chris Boswell kick), 4:58. Steelers 21–3. **Drive: 10 plays, 77 yards, 4:08.**

**Fourth quarter**

- PIT – Jonnu Smith 14-yard run (Chris Boswell kick), 13:01. Steelers 28–3. **Drive: 9 plays, 81 yards, 5:11.**
- MIA – Darren Waller 6-yard pass from Tua Tagovailoa (pass failed), 9:41. Steelers 28–9. **Drive: 6 plays, 65 yards, 3:20.**
- MIA – Darren Waller 13-yard pass from Tua Tagovailoa (pass failed), 2:32. Steelers 28–15. **Drive: 9 plays, 86 yards, 4:51.**

**Top passers**

- MIA – Tua Tagovailoa – 22/28, 253 yards, 2 TD, INT
- PIT – Aaron Rodgers – 23/27, 224 yards, 2 TD

**Top rushers**

- MIA – De'Von Achane – 12 rushes, 60 yards
- PIT – Kenneth Gainwell – 13 rushes, 80 yards

**Top receivers**

- MIA – De'Von Achane – 6 receptions, 67 yards
- PIT – DK Metcalf – 3 receptions, 55 yards, TD

Ben Roethlisberger, Joey Porter Sr., and Maurkice Pouncey were inducted into the 2025 Steelers Hall of Honor at this game. With the win, the Steelers improved to 8–6 and finished 3–1 against the AFC East while knocking the Dolphins out of playoff contention. Pittsburgh also extended their home winning streak on Monday Night Football to 23 games, having not lost a MNF contest at home since October 14, 1991.

==== Week 16: at Detroit Lions ====
Week 16: Pittsburgh Steelers at Detroit Lions – Game summary

Quarter	1	2	3	4	Total
**Steelers**	3	7	2	17	**29**
Lions	0	10	0	14	**24**

at Ford Field, Detroit, Michigan

- Date: December 21
- Game time: 4:25 p.m. EST
- Game weather: None (indoor stadium)
- Game attendance: 63,798
- Referee: Carl Cheffers
- TV announcers (CBS): Jim Nantz, Tony Romo and Tracy Wolfson
- Recap, Game Book

Game information

**First quarter**

- PIT – Chris Boswell 59-yard field goal, 9:21. Steelers 3–0. **Drive: 9 plays, 30 yards, 3:47.**

**Second quarter**

- DET – Jake Bates 36-yard field goal, 10:10. Tied 3–3. **Drive: 8 plays, 44 yards, 3:20.**
- DET – Isaac TeSlaa 20-yard pass from Jared Goff (Jake Bates kick), 1:55. Lions 10–3. **Drive: 6 plays, 62 yards, 2:07.**
- PIT – Kenneth Gainwell 45-yard pass from Aaron Rodgers (Chris Boswell kick), 0:02. Tied 10–10. **Drive: 11 plays, 80 yards, 1:53.**

**Third quarter**

- PIT – Jared Goff sacked by Kyle Dugger for a safety, 9:42. Steelers 12–10.

**Fourth quarter**

- PIT – Chris Boswell 23-yard field goal, 14:58. Steelers 15–10. **Drive: 17 plays, 64 yards, 9:44.**
- PIT – Jaylen Warren 45-yard run (Chris Boswell kick), 12:23. Steelers 22–10. **Drive: 4 plays, 61 yards, 2:02.**
- DET – Kalif Raymond 27-yard pass from Jared Goff (Jake Bates kick), 8:39. Steelers 22–17. **Drive: 10 plays, 74 yards, 3:44.**
- PIT – Jaylen Warren 45-yard run (Chris Boswell kick), 6:41. Steelers 29–17. **Drive: 3 plays, 65 yards, 1:58.**
- DET – Jahmyr Gibbs 4-yard pass from Jared Goff (Jake Bates kick), 4:11. Steelers 29–24. **Drive: 10 plays, 68 yards, 2:30.**

**Top passers**

- PIT – Aaron Rodgers – 27/41, 266 yards, TD
- DET – Jared Goff – 34/54, 364 yards, 3 TD

**Top rushers**

- PIT – Jaylen Warren – 14 rushes, 143 yards, 2 TD
- DET – David Montgomery – 4 rushes, 14 yards

**Top receivers**

- PIT – Kenneth Gainwell – 5 receptions, 78 yards, TD
- DET – Jameson Williams – 5 receptions, 70 yards

The game featured a controversial and memorable moment on its final play. On fourth down, Lions quarterback Jared Goff threw a pass to wide receiver Amon-Ra St. Brown that fell just short of the goal line. St. Brown pushed off Jalen Ramsey to create separation and, before being tackled by Steelers defenders, lateraled the ball back to Goff, who appeared to score a touchdown. However, multiple flags were thrown, and officials huddled for several minutes before announcing that the touchdown was nullified due to an offensive pass interference penalty on St. Brown, resulting in a final score of 29–24 in favor of Pittsburgh.

With the win, the Steelers secured their 22nd consecutive non-losing season, breaking the NFL record they had previously shared with the Dallas Cowboys, who recorded 21 straight non-losing seasons from 1965 to 1985. Head coach Mike Tomlin has finished every one of his 19 seasons with the team at .500 or better and also recorded his 200th total career win.

During the game, Steelers receiver DK Metcalf got into an altercation with a Lions fan. Video footage from the game showed Metcalf grabbing a shirt and engaging in a verbal exchange with the fan before attempting to strike the individual. The incident was not observed by game officials, and no penalty was assessed during the game. Following the game, the National Football League and the Pittsburgh Steelers stated that they were reviewing the incident. After the NFL reviewed the incident, Metcalf was suspended for the last two games of the regular season. Metcalf appealed, but the NFL denied his appeal and upheld his suspension.

==== Week 17: at Cleveland Browns ====
Week 17: Pittsburgh Steelers at Cleveland Browns – Game summary

Quarter	1	2	3	4	Total
Steelers	0	6	0	0	**6**
**Browns**	10	0	0	3	**13**

at Huntington Bank Field, Cleveland, Ohio

- Date: December 28
- Game time: 1:00 p.m. EST
- Game weather: Rain, 45 °F (7 °C)
- Game attendance: 67,194
- Referee: John Hussey
- TV announcers (CBS): Jim Nantz, Tony Romo and Tracy Wolfson
- Recap, Game Book

Game information

**First quarter**

- CLE – Andre Szmyt 50-yard field goal, 10:48. Browns 3–0. **Drive: 9 plays, 41 yards, 4:12.**
- CLE – Harold Fannin Jr. 28-yard pass from Shedeur Sanders (Andre Szmyt kick), 5:11. Browns 10–0. **Drive: 6 plays, 86 yards, 3:21.**

**Second quarter**

- PIT – Chris Boswell 44-yard field goal, 14:54. Browns 10–3. **Drive: 10 plays, 55 yards, 5:17.**
- PIT – Chris Boswell 40-yard field goal, 0:00. Browns 10–6. **Drive: 10 plays, 56 yards, 1:51.**

**Third quarter**

- No scoring plays

**Fourth quarter**

- CLE – Andre Szmyt 33-yard field goal, 1:40. Browns 13–6. **Drive: 4 plays, 5 yards, 0:18.**

**Top passers**

- PIT – Aaron Rodgers – 21/39, 168 yards
- CLE – Shedeur Sanders – 17/23, 186 yards, TD, 2 INT

**Top rushers**

- PIT – Jaylen Warren – 12 rushes, 64 yards
- CLE – Dylan Sampson – 11 rushes, 27 yards

**Top receivers**

- PIT – Pat Freiermuth – 3 receptions, 63 yards
- CLE – Jerry Jeudy – 5 receptions, 54 yards

With the upset loss, the Steelers missed an opportunity to clinch the AFC North title, setting up an AFC North showdown with the Ravens in Week 18 for the division title.

==== Week 18: vs. Baltimore Ravens ====
Week 18: Baltimore Ravens at Pittsburgh Steelers – Game summary

Quarter	1	2	3	4	Total
Ravens	7	3	0	14	**24**
**Steelers**	0	3	10	13	**26**

at Acrisure Stadium, Pittsburgh, Pennsylvania

- Date: January 4
- Game time: 8:20 p.m. EST
- Game weather: Cloudy, 25 °F (−4 °C)
- Game attendance: 65,400
- Referee: Shawn Smith
- TV announcers (NBC): Mike Tirico, Cris Collinsworth, and Melissa Stark
- Recap, Game Book

Game information

**First quarter**

- BAL – Devontez Walker 38-yard pass from Lamar Jackson (Tyler Loop kick), 10:54. Ravens 7–0. **Drive: 8 plays, 85 yards, 4:06.**

**Second quarter**

- BAL – Tyler Loop 40-yard field goal, 13:33. Ravens 10–0. **Drive: 6 plays, 23 yards, 3:09.**
- PIT – Chris Boswell 57-yard field goal, 8:52. Ravens 10–3. **Drive: 8 plays, 36 yards, 4:41.**

**Third quarter**

- PIT – Connor Heyward 1-yard run (Chris Boswell kick), 8:23. Tied 10–10. **Drive: 12 plays, 67 yards, 6:37.**
- PIT – Chris Boswell 25-yard field goal, 4:28. Steelers 13–10. **Drive: 6 plays, 19 yards, 2:57.**

**Fourth quarter**

- BAL – Zay Flowers 50-yard pass from Lamar Jackson (Tyler Loop kick), 8:42. Ravens 17–13. **Drive: 4 plays, 71 yards, 2:10.**
- PIT – Kenneth Gainwell 2-yard run (Chris Boswell kick), 3:49. Steelers 20–17. **Drive: 8 plays, 60 yards, 4:53.**
- BAL – Zay Flowers 64-yard pass from Lamar Jackson (Tyler Loop kick), 2:20. Ravens 24–20. **Drive: 3 plays, 73 yards, 1:29.**
- PIT – Calvin Austin III 26-yard pass from Aaron Rodgers (kick failed), 0:55. Steelers 26–24. **Drive: 6 plays, 65 yards, 1:25.**

**Top passers**

- BAL – Lamar Jackson – 11/18, 238 yards, 3 TD, INT
- PIT – Aaron Rodgers – 31/47, 294 yards, TD

**Top rushers**

- BAL – Derrick Henry – 20 rushes, 126 yards
- PIT – Jaylen Warren – 14 rushes, 66 yards

**Top receivers**

- BAL – Zay Flowers – 4 receptions, 138 yards, 2 TD
- PIT – Kenneth Gainwell – 8 receptions, 64 yards

With the win, the Steelers swept the Ravens for the first time since 2023 and clinched the AFC North for the first time since 2020 and the No. 4 seed. Pittsburgh finished the regular season at 10–7 (4–2 against the AFC North) and 6–3 at home.

=== Standings ===
==== Division ====
AFC North
	W	L	T	PCT	DIV	CONF	PF	PA	STK
^{(4)} Pittsburgh Steelers	10	7	0	.588	4–2	8–4	397	387	W1
Baltimore Ravens	8	9	0	.471	3–3	5–7	424	398	L1
Cincinnati Bengals	6	11	0	.353	3–3	5–7	414	492	L1
Cleveland Browns	5	12	0	.294	2–4	4–8	279	379	W2

==== Conference ====
AFC
Seed	Team	Division	W	L	T	PCT	DIV	CONF	SOS	SOV	STK
**Division leaders**
1 (Note: Denver finished ahead of New England based on common games (Denver 6–0 to New England 5–1 against: Cincinnati, Las Vegas, NY Giants, NY Jets and Tennessee).)	Denver Broncos	West	14	3	0	.824	5–1	9–3	.422	.378	W2
2	New England Patriots	East	14	3	0	.824	5–1	9–3	.391	.370	W3
3	Jacksonville Jaguars	South	13	4	0	.765	5–1	10–2	.478	.425	W8
4	Pittsburgh Steelers	North	10	7	0	.588	4–2	8–4	.503	.453	W1
**Wild cards**
5 (Note: Houston finished ahead of Buffalo based on head-to-head victory.)	Houston Texans	South	12	5	0	.706	5–1	10–2	.522	.441	W9
6	Buffalo Bills	East	12	5	0	.706	4–2	9–3	.471	.412	W1
7	Los Angeles Chargers	West	11	6	0	.647	5–1	8–4	.469	.425	L2
**Did not qualify for the postseason**
8 (Note: Indianapolis finished ahead of Baltimore based on conference record (Indianapolis 6–6 to Baltimore 5–7).)	Indianapolis Colts	South	8	9	0	.471	2–4	6–6	.540	.382	L7
9	Baltimore Ravens	North	8	9	0	.471	3–3	5–7	.507	.408	L1
10	Miami Dolphins	East	7	10	0	.412	3–3	3–9	.488	.378	L1
11 (Note: Cincinnati finished ahead of Kansas City based on conference record (Cincinnati 5–7 to Kansas City 3–9).)	Cincinnati Bengals	North	6	11	0	.353	3–3	5–7	.521	.451	L1
12	Kansas City Chiefs	West	6	11	0	.353	1–5	3–9	.514	.363	L6
13	Cleveland Browns	North	5	12	0	.294	2–4	4–8	.486	.418	W2
14 (Note: Las Vegas finished ahead of NY Jets and Tennessee based on conference record (Las Vegas 3–9 to NY Jets 2–10 and Tennessee 2–10).)	Las Vegas Raiders	West	3	14	0	.176	1–5	3–9	.538	.451	W1
15 (Note: NY Jets finished ahead of Tennessee based on strength of victory (NY Jets .373 to Tennessee .275).)	New York Jets	East	3	14	0	.176	0–6	2–10	.552	.373	L5
16	Tennessee Titans	South	3	14	0	.176	0–6	2–10	.574	.275	L2
**Tiebreakers** (Note: When breaking ties for three or more teams under the NFL's rules, they are first broken within divisions, then comparing only the highest ranked remaining team from each division.)

== Postseason ==
=== Schedule ===
Round	Date	Opponent (seed)	Result	Record	Venue	Recap
Wild Card	January 12	Houston Texans (5)	L 6–30	0–1	Acrisure Stadium	Recap

=== Game summaries ===
==== AFC Wild Card Playoffs: vs. (5) Houston Texans ====
AFC Wild Card Playoffs: (5) Houston Texans at (4) Pittsburgh Steelers – Game Summary

Quarter	1	2	3	4	Total
Texans	0	7	0	23	30
Steelers	3	3	0	0	6

at Acrisure Stadium, Pittsburgh, Pennsylvania

- Date: January 12, 2026
- Game time: 8:15 p.m. EST
- Game weather: Clear, 33 °F (1 °C)
- Referee: Craig Wrolstad
  Brad Rogers (alternate)
- TV announcers (ESPN/ABC): Joe Buck, Troy Aikman, Lisa Salters, and Laura Rutledge
- Recap, Game Book

Game information

First quarter

- PIT – Chris Boswell 32-yard field goal, 6:02. Steelers 3–0. Drive: 7 plays, 58 yards, 2:52.

Second quarter

- HOU – Christian Kirk 6-yard pass from C. J. Stroud (Ka'imi Fairbairn kick), 8:28. Texans 7–3. Drive: 14 plays, 92 yards, 7:01.
- PIT – Chris Boswell 36-yard field goal, 1:57. Texans 7–6. Drive: 8 plays, 4 yards, 4:17.

Third quarter

- No scoring plays

Fourth quarter

- HOU – Ka'imi Fairbairn 51-yard field goal, 13:07. Texans 10–6. Drive: 7 plays, 45 yards, 3:22.
- HOU – Sheldon Rankins 33-yard fumble recovery (Ka'imi Fairbairn kick), 11:23. Texans 17–6.
- HOU – Woody Marks 13-yard run (Ka'imi Fairbairn kick), 3:38. Texans 24–6. Drive: 11 plays, 87 yards, 5:51.
- HOU – Calen Bullock 51-yard interception return (kick failed), 2:39. Texans 30–6.

Top passers

- HOU – C. J. Stroud – 21/32, 250 yards, TD, INT
- PIT – Aaron Rodgers – 17/33, 146 yards, INT

Top rushers

- HOU – Woody Marks – 19 rushes, 112 yards, TD
- PIT – Jaylen Warren – 12 rushes, 43 yards

Top receivers

- HOU – Christian Kirk – 8 receptions, 144 yards, TD
- PIT – DK Metcalf – 2 receptions, 42 yards

The Steelers offense were unable to move the ball effectively as the Texans defense capitalized on a powerful performance, clamping the Steelers offense down to 175 total yards (112 passing, 63 rushing) as well as just two field goals in the first half, before shutting them out in the second half. The Texans scored two defensive touchdowns. One from Rodgers fumbling the ball that was recovered by defensive tackle Sheldon Rankins and returned for 33 yards, while the other defesive touchdown was a pick six to safety Calen Bullock returned for 51 yards. With their first home loss to Houston since 2002, the Steelers secured their seventh postseason loss since 2016 and this would mark their final game under Mike Tomlin, as he would resign from the team and step down as head coach the following day. Houston was also the first team since the 1991 New York Giants to defeat the Steelers in Pittsburgh on Monday night, officially ending a 23-game win streak for the Steelers.
