= Kenneth Gainwell =

American football player (born 1999)

Kenny Gainwell
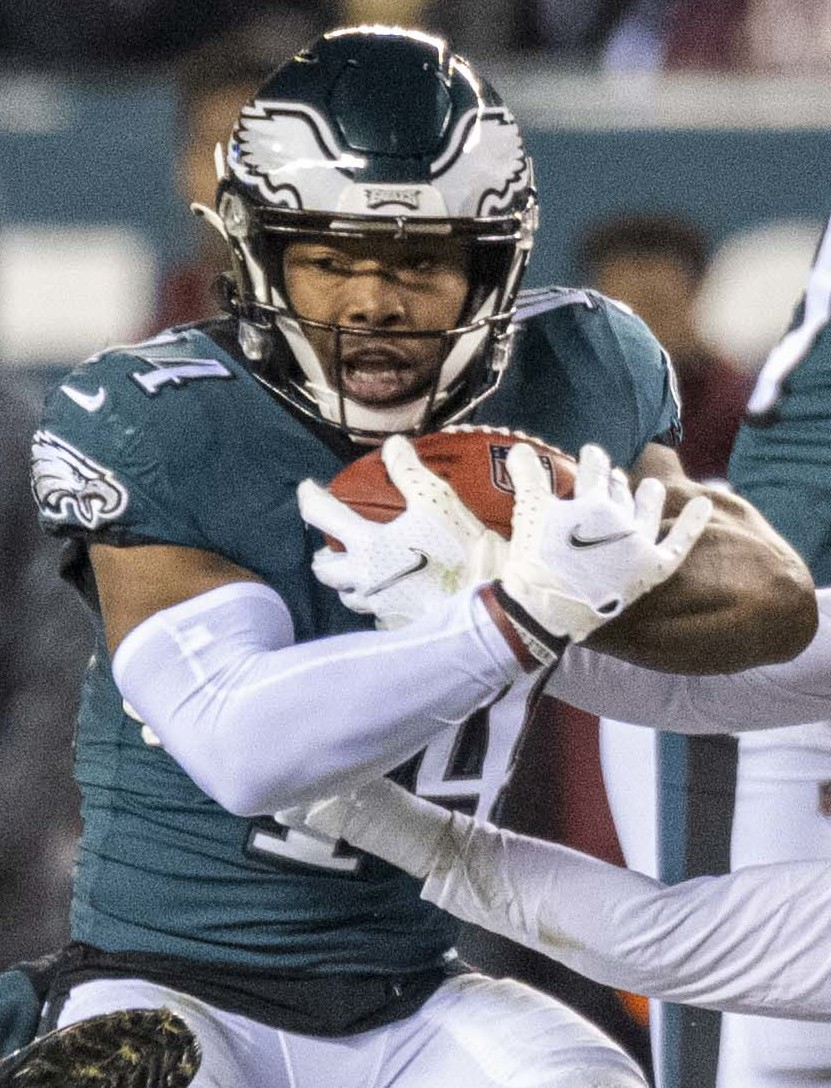
- Gainwell with the Philadelphia Eagles in 2021

No. 1 – Tampa Bay Buccaneers
- Positions: Running back, kick returner
- Roster status: Active

Personal information
- Born: March 14, 1999 (age 27); Yazoo City, Mississippi, U.S.
- Listed height: 5 ft 9 in (1.75 m)
- Listed weight: 200 lb (91 kg)

Career information
- High school: Yazoo County (Yazoo County, Mississippi)
- College: Memphis (2018–2020)
- NFL draft: 2021: 5th round, 150th overall pick

Career history
- Philadelphia Eagles (2021–2024); Pittsburgh Steelers (2025); Tampa Bay Buccaneers (2026–present)

Awards and highlights
- Super Bowl champion (LIX); First-team All-AAC (2019); AAC Rookie of the Year (2019); Shaun Alexander Award (2019)

Career NFL statistics as of Week 9, 2026
- Carries: 457
- Rushing yards: 2,027
- Yards per carry: 4.4
- Receptions: 190
- Receiving yards: 1,328
- Yards per reception: 7
- Total touchdowns: 26
- Kick returns: 66
- Kick return yards: 1,586
- Yards per kick return: 24
- Stats at Pro Football Reference

Kenneth "Kenny" Gainwell (born March 14, 1999) is an American professional football running back and kick returner for the Tampa Bay Buccaneers of the National Football League (NFL). He played college football for the Memphis Tigers.

== Early life ==
Gainwell grew up in Yazoo City, Mississippi and attended Yazoo County High School. He was a three-year starter at quarterback for the Panthers. As a junior, he passed for 1,184 yards and nine touchdowns and rushed for 1,292 yards and 20 touchdowns. During the summer going into his senior season, Gainwell committed to play college football at Memphis over offers from Ole Miss and Tulane. As a senior, he passed for 1,139 yards and 10 touchdowns and ran for 1,834 yards and 32 touchdowns. Gainwell was named Class 3A Mr. Football as he led the Panthers to a 14–1 record and an appearance in the Class 3A state championship game. Gainwell finished his high school career with 3,682 yards passing and 32 passing touchdowns and 4,730 rushing yards and 75 rushing touchdowns with one kickoff returned for a touchdown.

== College career ==
Gainwell moved to running back during summer training camp and played in four games as a true freshman before deciding to redshirt the rest of the season. He finished the season with four carries for 91 yards and a touchdown, a 73-yard run, and six receptions for 52 yards.

As a redshirt freshman, Gainwell was named the Tigers' starting running back following the departure of Tony Pollard. He was named the co-American Athletic Conference (AAC) player of the week after rushing for 104 yards and a touchdown and gaining 204 yards and scoring two touchdowns on nine receptions on October 19, 2019, in a 47–17 win over Tulane. He rushed for 1,459 yards with 13 touchdowns on 231 carries and caught 51 passes for 610 yards and three touchdowns and was named the AAC Freshman of the Year and first-team All-AAC. He was named a second-team All-American by the Sporting News and the American Football Coaches Association, the National Freshman of the Year by the Football Writers Association of America and won the Shaun Alexander Award.

Gainwell opted out of his final college season six days before the season opener after multiple family members died from COVID-19.

== Professional career ==
Pre-draft measurables
Height	Weight	Arm length	Hand span	Wingspan	40-yard dash	10-yard split	20-yard split	20-yard shuttle	Three-cone drill	Vertical jump	Broad jump	Bench press
5 ft 8 3/8 in (1.74 m)	201 lb (91 kg)	30 5/8 in (0.78 m)	9 7/8 in (0.25 m)	5 ft 10 1/4 in (1.78 m)	4.44 s	1.62 s	2.57 s	4.46 s	7.26 s	35.0 in (0.89 m)	10 ft 1 in (3.07 m)	21 reps
All values from Pro Day

=== Philadelphia Eagles ===
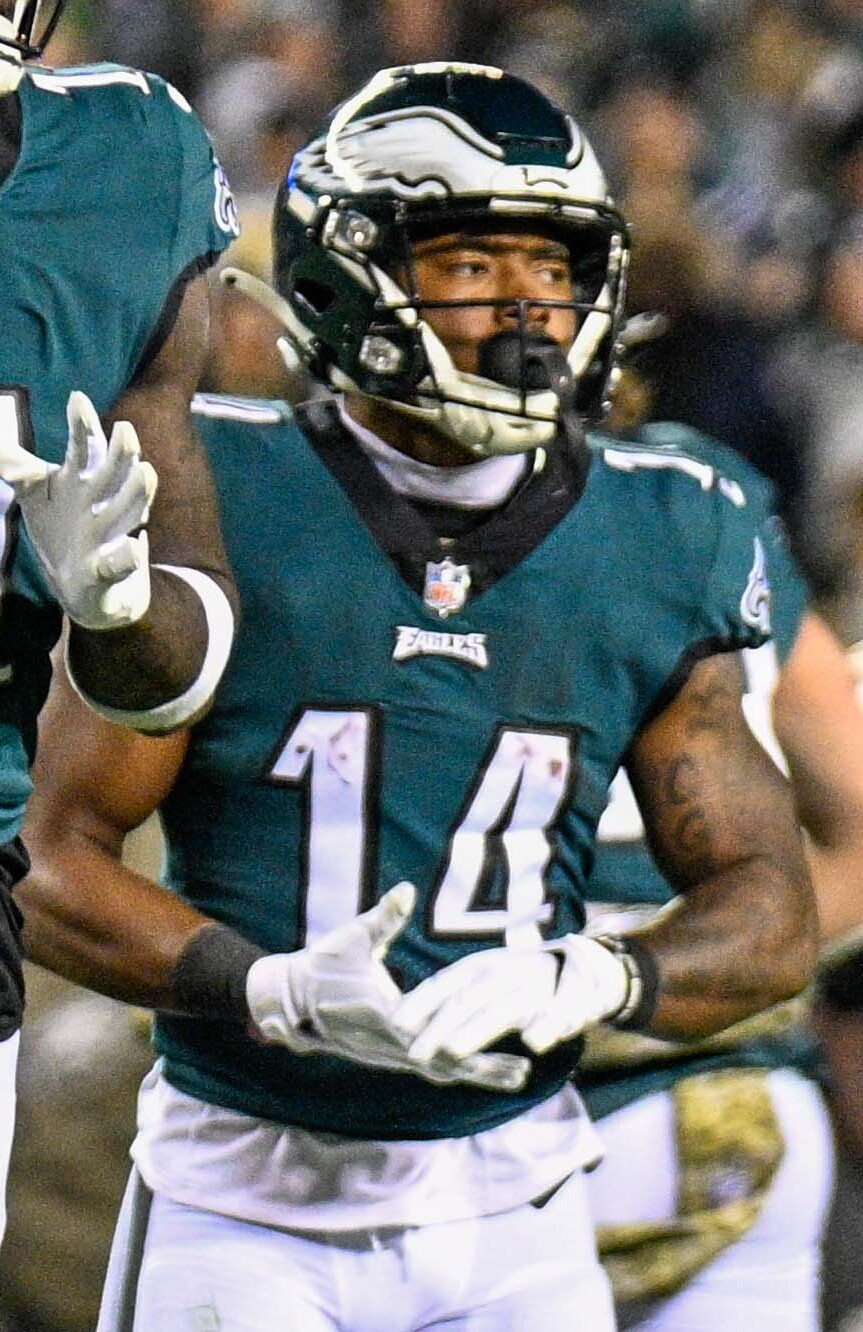
Gainwell during a game against the Washington Commanders in 2022

Gainwell was selected in the fifth round (150th overall) by the Philadelphia Eagles in the 2021 NFL draft. Gainwell was happy to be drafted by Philadelphia, as he grew up an Eagles fan, and his favorite player while growing up, Darren Sproles, works for the team as a consultant. Gainwell also said that he modeled his game after Sproles. He signed his four-year rookie contract with Philadelphia on June 3, 2021. Gainwell found moderate success as a rookie, as he ended the year with 68 carries for 291 yards and five touchdowns, while adding 33 receptions for 253 yards and one touchdown. Gainwell appeared in 16 games as a rookie, as he was a healthy scratch for the Eagles' week 11 showdown with the New Orleans Saints.

In the 2022 season, Gainwell had 53 carries for 240 rushing yards and four rushing touchdowns to go along with 23 receptions for 169 receiving yards. In the team's 38–7 Divisional Round victory over the New York Giants, he had 10 carries for a career high 112 yards and a touchdown, as well as one reception for nine yards. This performance made him just the sixth Eagles player to rush for at least 100 yards in a postseason game. Gainwell helped the Eagles reach Super Bowl LVII where they lost 38–35 to the Kansas City Chiefs. In the Super Bowl, Gainwell had seven carries for 21 rushing yards and four receptions for 20 receiving yards.

Gainwell got off to a slow start during the 2023 season. During a Week 9 game against the Washington Commanders in which he lost a fumble, Gainwell received criticism for responding to a fan's critical Instagram post at halftime. In the 2023 season, he had 84 carries for 364 rushing yards and two rushing touchdowns to go with 30 receptions for 183 receiving yards. In the 2024 season, Gainwell had 75 carries for 290 rushing yards and one rushing touchdown to go with 16 receptions for 116 receiving yards to go with some kick return duties. In Super Bowl LIX, he had six carries for ten yards in the 40–22 win over the Chiefs.

=== Pittsburgh Steelers ===
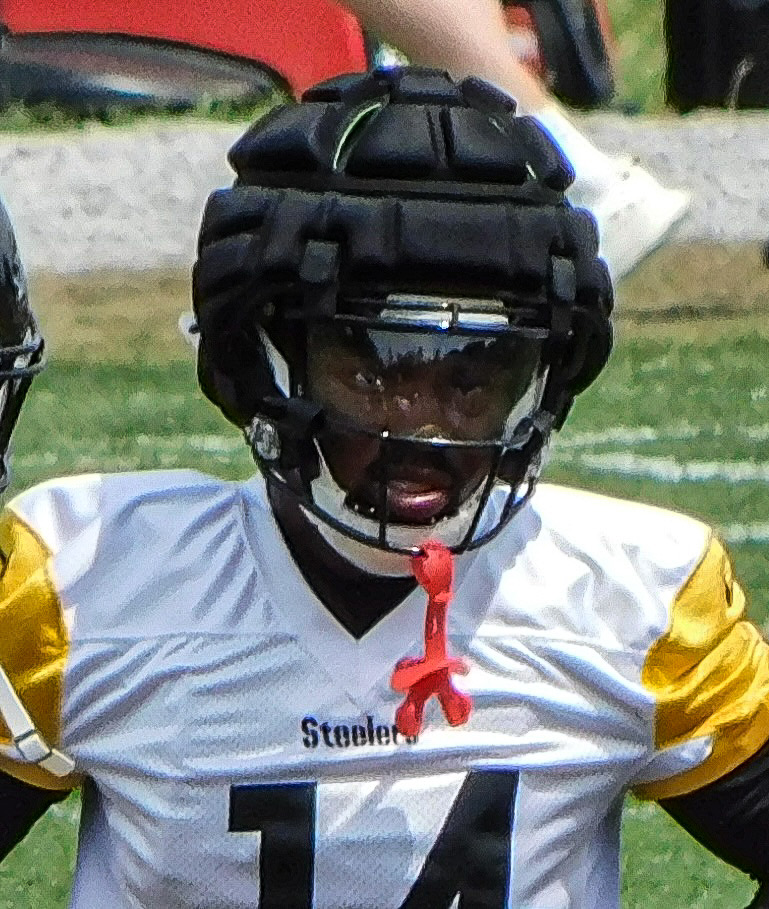
Gainwell with the Steelers in 2025

On March 13, 2025, Gainwell signed a one-year contract with the Pittsburgh Steelers. On September 2, he was named the team's backup running back behind Jaylen Warren and the team's kick return specialist.

Gainwell made his Steelers debut on September 7, recording seven rushes for 19 yards. His longest rush of the game was nine yards, which led the team. Gainwell also made three catches for four yards as the Steelers won 34–32. Against the Detroit Lions, Gainwell also had a notable catch fans were calling “Catch of the Year”. The catch, thrown by Aaron Rodgers, was caught by Gainwell with one hand on the ground after a pass interference penalty committed by Lions linebacker Alex Anzalone.

=== Tampa Bay Buccaneers ===
On March 13, 2026, Gainwell signed a two-year, $14 million contract with the Tampa Bay Buccaneers.

== NFL career statistics ==
Legend
	Won the Super Bowl
	Led the league
**Bold**	Career high

=== Regular season ===
Year	Team	Games		Rushing					Receiving						Kickoff return					Fumbles			
Year	Team	GP	GS	Att	Yds	Avg	Lng	TD	Tgt	Rec	Yds	Avg	Lng	TD	Ret	Yds	Avg	Lng	TD	FF	FR	Fum	Lost
2021	PHI	16	1	68	291	4.3	18	**5**	50	33	253	**7.7**	19	1	8	137	17.1	31	0	0	0	2	**1**
2022	PHI	**17**	0	53	240	4.5	13	4	29	23	169	7.3	20	0	0	0	0.0	0	0	0	0	0	0
2023	PHI	16	**2**	84	364	4.3	32	2	37	30	183	6.1	19	0	1	19	19.0	19	0	0	0	**3**	**1**
2024	PHI	**17**	1	75	290	3.9	20	1	22	16	116	7.3	16	0	18	456	**25.3**	**36**	0	0	0	0	0
2025	PIT	**17**	**2**	**114**	**537**	**4.7**	**55**	**5**	**85**	**73**	**486**	6.7	**45**	**3**	**26**	**633**	24.3	**36**	0	**1**	**1**	2	**1**
2026	TB	9	2	63	305	4.8	29	0	21	15	121	8.1	44	1	13	341	26.2	40	0	0	0	0	0
Career		92	8	457	2,027	4.4	55	16	244	190	1,328	7.0	45	5	66	1,586	24.0	40	0	1	1	7	3

=== Postseason ===
Year	Team	Games		Rushing					Receiving						Kickoff return					Fumbles			
Year	Team	GP	GS	Att	Yds	Avg	Lng	TD	Tgt	Rec	Yds	Avg	Lng	TD	Ret	Yds	Avg	Lng	TD	FF	FR	Fum	Lost
2021	PHI	1	0	1	6	**6.0**	6	0	5	5	49	**9.8**	**20**	**1**	3	57	19.0	24	0	0	1	0	0
2022	PHI	3	0	**33**	**181**	5.5	**35**	**1**	**9**	**7**	**55**	7.9	17	0	1	11	11.0	11	0	0	0	0	0
2023	PHI	1	0	4	3	0.8	4	0	2	2	10	5.0	9	0	0	0	0.0	0	0	0	0	0	0
2024	PHI	**4**	0	13	42	3.2	10	0	3	3	10	8.7	10	0	**4**	**110**	**27.5**	**44**	0	0	**2**	0	0
2025	PIT	1	0	6	20	3.3	14	0	6	4	26	6.5	12	0	**4**	100	25.0	28	0	0	0	0	0
Career		10	0	57	252	4.4	35	1	25	21	166	7.9	20	1	12	278	23.2	44	0	0	3	0	0

== Personal life ==
Gainwell's younger brother, Kory, played defensive back and running back at Yazoo County and is committed to play at Memphis. Gainwell is the cousin of former Eagles player Fletcher Cox, who was his teammate for three seasons.
