= 2018 Ohio State Buckeyes football team =

American college football season

2018 Ohio State Buckeyes football

Big Ten champion Big Ten East Division co-champion Rose Bowl champion

Big Ten Championship Game, W 45–24 vs. Northwestern

Rose Bowl, W 28–23 vs. Washington
- Conference: Big Ten Conference
- East Division

Ranking
- Coaches: No. 3
- AP: No. 3
- Record: 13–1 (8–1 Big Ten)
- Head coach: Urban Meyer (7th season; remainder of season); Ryan Day (first 3 games)
- Offensive coordinator: Ryan Day (2nd season)
- Co-offensive coordinator: Kevin Wilson (2nd season)
- Offensive scheme: Spread
- Defensive coordinator: Greg Schiano (3rd season)
- Co-defensive coordinator: Alex Grinch (1st season)
- Base defense: 4–3
- Home stadium: Ohio Stadium

2018 Big Ten Conference football standings
	Conf.			Overall
Team	W		L	W		L
East Division
No. 3 Ohio State xy$	8	–	1	13	–	1
No. 14 Michigan x	8	–	1	10	–	3
No. 17 Penn State	6	–	3	9	–	4
Michigan State	5	–	4	7	–	6
Maryland	3	–	6	5	–	7
Indiana	2	–	7	5	–	7
Rutgers	0	–	9	1	–	11
West Division
No. 21 Northwestern xy	8	–	1	9	–	5
Wisconsin	5	–	4	8	–	5
No. 25 Iowa	5	–	4	9	–	4
Purdue	5	–	4	6	–	7
Minnesota	3	–	6	7	–	6
Nebraska	3	–	6	4	–	8
Illinois	2	–	7	4	–	8
Championship: Ohio State 45, Northwestern 24
$ – Conference champion; x – Division champion/co-champions; y – Championship game participant; Rankings from AP Poll

The 2018 Ohio State Buckeyes football team represented Ohio State University during the 2018 NCAA Division I FBS football season. The Buckeyes played their home games at Ohio Stadium in Columbus, Ohio. This was the Buckeyes' 129th overall season and 106th as a member of the Big Ten Conference. They were led by head coach Urban Meyer in his seventh and final season at Ohio State.

Shortly before the season, head coach Urban Meyer was placed on administrative leave due to allegations that he was aware of domestic violence incidents involving former wide receivers coach Zach Smith. Ryan Day was named acting head coach. After a lengthy investigation, Meyer was suspended for three games for poor handling of the situation. Day acted as the head coach during Meyer's suspension.

The Buckeyes won each of their three games under Ryan Day to open the season, including a victory over then-No. 15 TCU in AT&T Stadium in Arlington, Texas. After Urban Meyer's return, Ohio State won their following four games, including a close win on the road over then-No. 9 Penn State. Ohio State rose to second in the AP Poll, but suffered a devastating loss on the road to Purdue, 49–20. The Buckeyes won their remaining regular season games, however, and secured a spot in the 2018 Big Ten Football Championship Game after defeating rival No. 4 Michigan 62–39. Ohio State defeated West Division champion Northwestern in that game convincingly, 45–24, but in the final College Football Playoff rankings of the year, the Buckeyes were ranked sixth, leaving them just outside the playoff for the second consecutive year. The team was invited to the Rose Bowl to play Pac-12 Conference champion Washington. In the weeks before the game, Urban Meyer announced that he would retire at the end of the season, and the Rose Bowl would be his final game as head coach. The Buckeyes won the game to finish the year at 13–1, and were ranked third in the final polls.

The team was led offensively by quarterback Dwayne Haskins, who led FBS with 4,831 passing yards and 50 passing touchdowns, both of which set school records by wide margins. Haskins was named Big Ten Offensive Player of the Year and was a finalist for the Heisman Trophy, finishing in third. On the ground, running backs J. K. Dobbins and Mike Weber combined for over 2,000 yards rushing. Wide receiver Parris Campbell led the team with 1,063 receiving yards and a Big Ten-leading 12 receiving touchdowns. Defensive star and pre-season All-American lineman Nick Bosa suffered a groin injury during the game against TCU. He underwent surgery and elected not to return to the team, instead focusing on recovering for the 2019 NFL draft.

== Offseason ==
=== 2018 NFL draft ===
Round	Pick	Team	Player	Position
1	4	Cleveland Browns	Denzel Ward	CB
1	21	Cincinnati Bengals	Billy Price	C
2	64	Indianapolis Colts	Tyquan Lewis	DE
3	73	Miami Dolphins	Jerome Baker	LB
3	77	Cincinnati Bengals	Sam Hubbard	DE
4	102	Minnesota Vikings	Jalyn Holmes	DE
5	168	Seattle Seahawks	Jamarco Jones	OT

== Recruiting ==
=== Recruiting class ===
The Buckeyes signed a total of 26 recruits. The class was rated as the second best in the country behind Georgia by the 247Sports Composite, and the best class in the Big Ten Conference. Headlining the class were consensus five star recruits Nicholas Petit-Frere (offensive tackle), Taron Vincent (defensive tackle), and Tyreke Johnson (safety).

College recruiting (2018)
Name	Hometown	School	Height	Weight	Commit date
Brian Snead; RB	Seffner, Florida	Armwood High School	5 ft 11 in (1.80 m)	200 lb (91 kg)	Jul 22, 2016
Brian Snead; RB	Recruit ratings: Scout: Rivals: 247Sports: ESPN:				
Jaelen Gill; RB	Westerville, Ohio	Westerville South High School	6 ft 1 in (1.85 m)	182 lb (83 kg)	Mar 1, 2017
Jaelen Gill; RB	Recruit ratings: Scout: Rivals: 247Sports: ESPN:				
Taron Vincent; DT	Baltimore, Maryland	IMG Academy (Bradenton, FL)	6 ft 2 in (1.88 m)	285 lb (129 kg)	Apr 2, 2017
Taron Vincent; DT	Recruit ratings: Scout: Rivals: 247Sports: ESPN:				
Josh Proctor; S	Owasso, Oklahoma	Owasso High School	6 ft 2 in (1.88 m)	190 lb (86 kg)	Apr 15, 2017
Josh Proctor; S	Recruit ratings: Scout: Rivals: 247Sports: ESPN:				
Max Wray; OT	Franklin, Tennessee	Franklin High School	6 ft 6 in (1.98 m)	282 lb (128 kg)	Apr 15, 2017
Max Wray; OT	Recruit ratings: Scout: Rivals: 247Sports: ESPN:				
Sevyn Banks; CB	Orlando, Florida	Jones High School	6 ft 1 in (1.85 m)	180 lb (82 kg)	Apr 26, 2017
Sevyn Banks; CB	Recruit ratings: Scout: Rivals: 247Sports: ESPN:				
Dallas Gant; LB	Toledo, Ohio	St. John's Jesuit High School and Academy	6 ft 3 in (1.91 m)	225 lb (102 kg)	May 16, 2017
Dallas Gant; LB	Recruit ratings: Scout: Rivals: 247Sports: ESPN:				
Teradja Mitchell; LB	Virginia Beach, Virginia	Bishop Sullivan Catholic High School	6 ft 2 in (1.88 m)	232 lb (105 kg)	Jun 2, 2017
Teradja Mitchell; LB	Recruit ratings: Scout: Rivals: 247Sports: ESPN:				
Master Teague; RB	Murfreesboro, Tennessee	Blackman High School	5 ft 11 in (1.80 m)	210 lb (95 kg)	Jun 11, 2017
Master Teague; RB	Recruit ratings: Scout: Rivals: 247Sports: ESPN:				
Matthew Jones; C	Brooklyn, New York	Erasmus Hall High School	6 ft 4 in (1.93 m)	300 lb (140 kg)	Jun 17, 2017
Matthew Jones; C	Recruit ratings: Scout: Rivals: 247Sports: ESPN:				
Jeremy Ruckert; TE	Lindenhurst, New York	Lindenhurst High School	6 ft 6 in (1.98 m)	230 lb (100 kg)	Jul 17, 2017
Jeremy Ruckert; TE	Recruit ratings: Scout: Rivals: 247Sports: ESPN:				
Marcus Hooker; CB	New Castle, Pennsylvania	New Castle High School	6 ft 0 in (1.83 m)	185 lb (84 kg)	Jul 27, 2017
Marcus Hooker; CB	Recruit ratings: Scout: Rivals: 247Sports: ESPN:				
K'Vaughan Pope; LB	Dinwiddie, Virginia	Dinwiddie County High School	6 ft 2 in (1.88 m)	210 lb (95 kg)	Aug 4, 2017
K'Vaughan Pope; LB	Recruit ratings: Scout: Rivals: 247Sports: ESPN:				
L'Christian Smith; WR	Huber Heights, Ohio	Wayne High School	6 ft 6 in (1.98 m)	205 lb (93 kg)	Aug 27, 2017
L'Christian Smith; WR	Recruit ratings: Scout: Rivals: 247Sports: ESPN:				
Antwuan Jackson; DT	Ellenwood, Georgia	Blinn College	6 ft 3 in (1.91 m)	305 lb (138 kg)	Sep 12, 2017
Antwuan Jackson; DT	Recruit ratings: Scout: Rivals: 247Sports: ESPN:				
Tyreke Johnson; S	Jacksonville, Florida	Trinity Christian Academy	6 ft 1 in (1.85 m)	191 lb (87 kg)	Dec 5, 2017
Tyreke Johnson; S	Recruit ratings: Scout: Rivals: 247Sports: ESPN:				
Matthew Baldwin; QB	Austin, Texas	Lake Travis High School	6 ft 3 in (1.91 m)	195 lb (88 kg)	Dec 7, 2017
Matthew Baldwin; QB	Recruit ratings: Scout: Rivals: 247Sports: ESPN:				
Tommy Togiai; DT	Pocatello, Idaho	Highland High School	6 ft 3 in (1.91 m)	290 lb (130 kg)	Dec 12, 2017
Tommy Togiai; DT	Recruit ratings: Scout: Rivals: 247Sports: ESPN:				
Kamryn Babb; WR	St. Louis, Missouri	Christian Brothers College High School	6 ft 1 in (1.85 m)	189 lb (86 kg)	Dec 12, 2017
Kamryn Babb; WR	Recruit ratings: Scout: Rivals: 247Sports: ESPN:				
Alex Williams; DE	Pickerington, Ohio	Pickerington High School North	6 ft 7 in (2.01 m)	250 lb (110 kg)	Dec 19, 2017
Alex Williams; DE	Recruit ratings: Scout: Rivals: 247Sports: ESPN:				
Cameron Brown; WR	St. Louis, Missouri	Christian Brothers College High School	6 ft 1 in (1.85 m)	175 lb (79 kg)	Dec 20, 2017
Cameron Brown; WR	Recruit ratings: Scout: Rivals: 247Sports: ESPN:				
Tyreke Smith; DE	Cleveland Heights, Ohio	Cleveland Heights High School	6 ft 3 in (1.91 m)	260 lb (120 kg)	Jan 4, 2018
Tyreke Smith; DE	Recruit ratings: Scout: Rivals: 247Sports: ESPN:				
Tyler Friday; DT	Ramsey, New Jersey	Don Bosco Preparatory High School	6 ft 3 in (1.91 m)	263 lb (119 kg)	Jan 19, 2018
Tyler Friday; DT	Recruit ratings: Scout: Rivals: 247Sports: ESPN:				
Chris Olave; WR	San Marcos, California	Mission Hills High School	6 ft 1 in (1.85 m)	170 lb (77 kg)	Jan 28, 2018
Chris Olave; WR	Recruit ratings: Scout: Rivals: 247Sports: ESPN:				
Nicholas Petit-Frere; OT	Tampa, Florida	Berkeley Preparatory School	6 ft 6 in (1.98 m)	272 lb (123 kg)	Feb 7, 2018
Nicholas Petit-Frere; OT	Recruit ratings: Scout: Rivals: 247Sports: ESPN:				
Javontae Jean-Baptiste; LB	Oradell, New Jersey	Bergen Catholic High School	6 ft 5 in (1.96 m)	215 lb (98 kg)	Feb 7, 2018
Javontae Jean-Baptiste; LB	Recruit ratings: Scout: Rivals: 247Sports: ESPN:				
Overall recruit ranking: Rivals: 2 247Sports: 2 ESPN: 2
Note: In many cases, Scout, Rivals, 247Sports, On3, and ESPN may conflict in their listings of height and weight.; In these cases, the average was taken. ESPN grades are on a 100-point scale.; Sources: "Ohio State Football Commitments". Rivals.; "2018 Team Ranking". Rivals.com.

== Preseason ==
=== Award watch lists ===
Award	Player	Position	Year
Lott Trophy	Nick Bosa	DE	JR
Lott Trophy	Jordan Fuller	S	JR
Chuck Bednarik Award	Nick Bosa	DE	JR
Maxwell Award	Nick Bosa	DE	JR
Maxwell Award	J. K. Dobbins	RB	SO
Doak Walker Award	J. K Dobbins	RB	SO
John Mackey Award	Luke Farrell	TE	SO
Jim Thorpe Award	Jordan Fuller	S	JR
Bronko Nagurski Trophy	Nick Bosa	DE	JR
Bronko Nagurski Trophy	Dre'Mont Jones	DT	JR
Outland Trophy	Dre'Mont Jones	DT	JR
Outland Trophy	Michael Jordan	OL	JR
Outland Trophy	Isaiah Prince	OL	SR
Ray Guy Award	Drue Chrisman	P	SO
Paul Hornung Award	Parris Campbell	WR/KR	SR
Walter Camp Award	Nick Bosa	DE	JR
Walter Camp Award	J. K. Dobbins	RB	SO
Ted Hendricks Award	Nick Bosa	DE	JR
Earl Campbell Tyler Rose Award	J. K Dobbins	RB	SO

== Schedule ==
Date	Time	Opponent	Rank	Site	TV	Result	Attendance
September 1	12:00 p.m.	Oregon State*	No. 5	Ohio Stadium; Columbus, OH	ABC	W 77–31	102,169
September 8	3:30 p.m.	Rutgers	No. 4	Ohio Stadium; Columbus, OH	BTN	W 52–3	93,057
September 15	8:00 p.m.	vs. No. 15 TCU*	No. 4	AT&T Stadium; Arlington, TX (College GameDay)	ABC	W 40–28	64,362
September 22	3:30 p.m.	Tulane*	No. 4	Ohio Stadium; Columbus, OH	BTN	W 49–6	103,336
September 29	7:30 p.m.	at No. 9 Penn State	No. 4	Beaver Stadium; University Park, PA (rivalry / College GameDay)	ABC	W 27–26	110,889
October 6	4:00 p.m.	Indiana ^{†}	No. 3	Ohio Stadium; Columbus, OH	FOX	W 49–26	104,193
October 13	12:00 p.m.	Minnesota	No. 3	Ohio Stadium; Columbus, OH	FS1	W 30–14	100,042
October 20	7:30 p.m.	at Purdue	No. 2	Ross–Ade Stadium; West Lafayette, IN	ABC	L 20–49	60,716
November 3	12:00 p.m.	Nebraska	No. 8	Ohio Stadium; Columbus, OH	FOX	W 36–31	104,245
November 10	12:00 p.m.	at No. 24 Michigan State	No. 10	Spartan Stadium; East Lansing, MI	FOX	W 26–6	74,633
November 17	12:00 p.m.	at Maryland	No. 10	Maryland Stadium; College Park, MD	ABC	W 52–51^{OT}	38,177
November 24	12:00 p.m.	No. 4 Michigan	No. 10	Ohio Stadium; Columbus, OH (The Game / College GameDay)	FOX	W 62–39	106,588
December 1	8:00 p.m.	vs. No. 21 Northwestern	No. 6	Lucas Oil Stadium; Indianapolis, IN (Big Ten Championship)	FOX	W 45–24	66,375
January 1, 2019	5:00 p.m.	vs. No. 9 Washington*	No. 6	Rose Bowl; Pasadena, CA (Rose Bowl / College GameDay)	ESPN	W 28–23	91,853
*Non-conference game; ^{†}Homecoming; Rankings from AP Poll and CFP Rankings (after October 30) released prior to game; All times are in Eastern time

== Rankings ==
Ranking movements Legend: ██ Increase in ranking ██ Decrease in ranking ( ) = First-place votes
	Week															
Poll	Pre	1	2	3	4	5	6	7	8	9	10	11	12	13	14	Final
AP	5	4	4	4	4	3 (1)	3 (1)	2 (1)	11	8	8	9	10	6	5	3
Coaches	3 (1)	4 (1)	4 (1)	4 (1)	4 (1)	3 (1)	3 (1)	2 (1)	9	8	7	8	10	6	5	3
CFP	Not released									10	10	10	10	6	6	Not released

== Personnel ==
=== Roster ===
2018 Ohio State Buckeyes football team roster
Players
Coaches
Offense

Pos.	#	Name	Class
WR	1	Johnnie Dixon (C)	Sr
RB	2	J. K. Dobbins	So
QB	4	Chris Chugunov	Jr
RB	6	Brian Snead	Fr
QB	7	Dwayne Haskins	So
WR	9	Binjimen Victor	Jr
WR	11	Austin Mack	Jr
QB	12	Matthew Baldwin	Fr
TE	13	Rashod Berry	Jr
WR	14	K. J. Hill	Jr
WR	15	Jaylen Harris	So
QB	16	Kory Curtis	So
WR	17	Chris Olave	Fr
QB	18	Tate Martell	Fr
WR	21	Parris Campbell (C)	Sr
WR	23	De'Shawn White	So
WR	24	Sam Wiglusz	Fr
RB	25	Mike Weber	Jr
WR	26	Cameron Brown	Fr
HB	26	Jaelen Gill	Fr
RB	28	Amari McMahon	Jr
RB	30	Demario McCall	So
RB	33	Master Teague	Fr
RB	34	Mitch Rossi	So
TE	37	Derrick Malone	Sr
RB	46	Madu Enoli	So
TE	48	Tate Duarte	Sr
OL	50	Nathan Brock	Jr
OL	52	Wyatt Davis	Fr
OL	54	Matthew Jones	Fr
OL	58	Joshua Alabi	Jr
OL	59	Isaiah Prince (C)	Sr
OL	60	Blake Pfenning	Sr
OL	61	Gavin Cupp	So
OL	62	Pahl Brandon	Sr
OL	63	Kevin Woidke	Sr
OL	66	Malcolm Pridgeon	Sr
OL	71	Josh Myers	Fr
G	73	Michael Jordan	Jr
OL	74	Max Wray	Fr
OL	75	Thayer Munford	So
OL	76	Branden Bowen	Jr
OT	77	Nicholas Petit-Frere	Fr
OL	78	Demetrius Knox	Sr
OL	79	Brady Taylor	Sr
WR	80	C. J. Saunders	Jr
TE	81	Jake Hausmann	So
WR	82	Garyn Prater	So
WR	83	Terry McLaurin (C)	Sr
TE	84	Brock Davin	Jr
WR	85	L'Christian Smith	Fr
WR	87	Elijah Gardiner	Fr
TE	88	Jeremy Ruckert	Fr
TE	89	Luke Farrell	So

Defense

Pos.	#	Name	Class
CB	1	Jeff Okudah	So
DE	2	Chase Young	So
CB	3	Damon Arnette	Jr
S	4	Jordan Fuller (C)	Jr
LB	5	Baron Browning	So
DT	6	Taron Vincent	Fr
LB	7	Teradja Mitchell	Fr
CB	8	Kendall Sheffield	Jr
DE	9	Jashon Cornell	Jr
S	10	Amir Riep	So
DE	11	Tyreke Smith	Fr
CB	12	Sevyn Banks	Fr
CB	13	Tyreke Johnson	Fr
S	14	Isaiah Pryor	So
S	15	Josh Proctor	Fr
LB	16	Keandre Jones	Jr
ATH	17	Alex Williams	Fr
DE	18	Jonathon Cooper	So
LB	19	Dallas Gant	Fr
LB	20	Pete Werner	So
CB	21	Marcus Williamson	So
S	23	Jahsen Wint	So
CB	24	Shaun Wade	Fr
S	25	Brendon White	So
CB	28	Alex Badine	Jr
S	29	Marcus Hooker	Fr
S	30	Kevin Dever	So
LB	32	Tuf Borland (C)	So
LB	33	Dante Booker	Sr
S	34	Owen Fankhauser	Jr
LB	36	K'Vaughn Pope	Fr
DE	38	Javontae Jean-Baptiste	Fr
LB	39	Malik Harrison	Jr
LB	41	Hayden Jester	Jr
CB	42	Lloyd McFarquhar	Fr
LB	47	Justin Hilliard	Jr
LB	48	Logan Hittle	Jr
CB	49	Xavier Johnson	Fr
DT	51	Antwuan Jackson	So
DT	53	DaVon Hamilton	Jr
DE	54	Tyler Friday	Fr
DT	55	Malik Barrow	So
DL	56	Aaron Cox	So
DL	67	Robert Landers	Jr
DT	68	Zaid Hamdan	Fr
DL	70	Noah Donald	Jr
DT	72	Tommy Togiai	Fr
DL	86	Dre'Mont Jones	Jr
DT	92	Haskell Garrett	So
DL	97	Nick Bosa (injured) (C)	Jr
DT	98	Jerron Cage	Fr

Special teams

Pos.	#	Name	Class
P	19	Jake Metzer	Jr
PK	28	Dominic DiMaccio	Fr
PK	29	Zach Hoover (I)	So
LS	42	Bradley Robinson	Jr
LS	49	Liam McCullough	Jr
LS	65	Phillip Thomas	Jr
P	90	Bryan Kristan	Sr
P	91	Drue Chrisman	So
PK	95	Blake Haubeil	So
PK	96	Sean Nuernberger	Sr

Head coach

- Urban Meyer

Coordinators/assistant coaches

- Greg Schiano (Associate head coach / defensive coordinator)
- Tony Alford (assistant head coach / running backs)
- Billy Davis (linebackers)
- Ryan Day (offensive coordinator / quarterbacks)
- Alex Grinch (co-defensive coordinator / safeties)
- Brian Hartline (Interim wide receivers)
- Larry Johnson (assistant head coach / defensive line)
- Taver Johnson (cornerbacks)
- Greg Studrawa (offensive line)
- Kevin Wilson (offensive coordinator / tight ends)
- Corey Dennis (senior quality control – offense)
- Louie Addazio (graduate assistant – offense)
- Kenny Anunike (graduate assistant – defense)
- Keenan Bailey (graduate assistant – defense)
- Parker Fleming (quality control coach – special teams)
- Bob Fraser (quality control coach – defense)
- Matt Thurin (quality control coach – defense)
- Peter Badovinac (graduate assistant – defense)

Legend

- (C) Team captain
- (S) Suspended
- (I) Ineligible
- Injured
- Redshirt

Roster
Last update: August 29, 2018

== Depth chart ==
Starters and backups.

Defense

FS
⋅
⋅

WLB	MLB	SLB
⋅	⋅	⋅
⋅	⋅	⋅

SS
⋅
⋅

CB
⋅
⋅

DE	DT	DT	DE
⋅	⋅	⋅	⋅
⋅	⋅	⋅	⋅

CB
⋅
⋅

Offense

WR
83 Terry McLaurin
1 Johnnie Dixon

H-Back
21 Parris Campbell
14 K. J. Hill

LT	LG	C	RG	RT
75 Thayer Munford	66 Malcolm Pridgeon	73 Michael Jordan	78 Demetris Knox	59 Isaiah Prince
58 Joshua Albai	79 Brady Taylor	71 Josh Myers	52 Wyatt Davis	77 Nicholas Petit-Frere

TE
89 Luke Farrell
13 Rashod Berry

WR
9 Binjimen Victor
11 Austin Mack

QB
7 Dwayne Haskins
18 Tate Martell

Special teams

P ]

RB
2 J. K. Dobbins 25 Mike Weber
33 Master Teague

=== Coaching changes ===
- Wide receiver coach Zach Smith was fired in July 2018 after domestic violence allegations came to light. Brian Hartline was named interim WR coach.
- Head coach Urban Meyer was placed on administrative leave after reports surfaced claiming he knew about Smith's incidents of domestic violence. Ryan Day was named acting head coach.

== Game summaries ==
=== Oregon State ===
No. 5 Ohio State vs Oregon State

Team	1	2	3	4	Total
Oregon State	7	7	17	0	31
• No. 5 Ohio State	21	21	14	21	77

- Date: September 1, 2018
- Location:
  Ohio Stadium
  Columbus, OH
- Game start: 12:00 p.m. EDT
- Elapsed time: 3:06
- Game attendance: 102,169
- Game weather: Cloudy/Rain possible
- Referee: Matt Austin (SEC Crew)
- TV announcers: (ABC): Dave Pasch and Greg McElroy

Scoring summary
Q1	11:17	OHST	McLaurin 2 yard pass from Haskins (Nuernberger kick)	OHST 7–0
Q1	10:35	ORST	Bradford 49 yard pass from Blount (Choukair kick)	Tie 7–7
Q1	8:20	OHST	Weber 16 yard run (Nuernberger kick)	OHST 14–7
Q1	3:41	OHST	Berry 6 yard pass from Haskins (Nuernberger kick)	OHST 21–7
Q2	12:25	OHST	Weber 49 yard run (Nuernberger kick)	OHST 28–7
Q2	7:58	OHST	Weber 3 yard pass from Haskins (Nuernberger kick)	OHST 35–7
Q2	4:30	OHST	Bosa recovered fumble in end zone (Nuernberger kick)	OHST 42–7
Q2	0:19	ORST	Bradford 7 yard pass from Blount (Choukair kick)	OHST 42–14
Q3	14:45	OHST	McLaurin 75 yard pass from Haskins (Nuernberger kick)	OHST 49–14
Q3	14:26	ORST	Pierce 80 yard run (Choukair kick)	OHST 49–21
Q3	11:55	OHST	Campbell 8 yard pass from Haskins (Nuernberger kick)	OHST 56–21
Q3	11:06	ORST	Pierce 78 yard run (Choukair kick)	OHST 56–28
Q3	5:25	ORST	Choukair 23 yard field goal	OHST 49–31
Q4	14:25	OHST	Weber 4 yard run (Nuernberger kick)	OHST 63–31
Q4	9:26	OHST	Snead 2 yard run (Nuernberger kick)	OHST 70–31
Q4	3:50	OHST	Teague 33 yard run (Nuernberger kick)	OHST 77–31

Game Statistics

Statistic	OH St.	OR St.
Total yards	721	392
Passing yards	346	196
Rushing yards	375	196
Penalties	6-50	5-49
Turnovers	2	2
Time of possession	31:16	28:44

Game Leaders

Statistic	Ohio State	Oregon State
Passing	Dwayne Haskins (313)	Conor Blount (169)
Rushing	Mike Weber (186)	Artavis Pierce (168)
Receiving	Terry McLaurin (121)	Trevon Bradford (104)

=== Rutgers ===
No. 4 Ohio State vs Rutgers

Team	1	2	3	4	Total
Rutgers	0	0	3	0	3
• No. 4 Ohio State	14	21	10	7	52

- Date: September 8, 2018
- Location:
  Ohio Stadium
  Columbus, OH
- Game start: 3:30 p.m. EDT
- Game attendance: 93,057
- Game weather: Rain
- Referee: Ron Snodgrass
- TV announcers: (BTN): Kevin Kugler and Matt Millen

Game Statistics

Statistic	OSU	RU
Total yards	579	134
Passing yards	354	65
Rushing yards	225	69
Penalties	11-120	7-72
Turnovers	0	2
Time of possession	31:37	28:23

Game Leaders

Statistic	Ohio State	Rutgers
Passing	Dwayne Haskins (233)	Artur Sitkowski (38)
Rushing	Tate Martell (95)	Raheem Blackshear (31)
Receiving	Johnnie Dixon (89)	Travis Vokolek (13)

=== Vs. TCU ===
Advocare Showdown: #4 Ohio State Buckeyes (2–0) vs. #15 TCU Horned Frogs (2–0)

Quarter	1	2	3	4	Total
Ohio State	10	3	20	7	40
TCU	7	7	14	0	28

at AT&T Stadium • Arlington, Texas

- Date: September 15
- Game time: 7:00 p.m. CDT
- Game weather: Indoors (roof closed)
- Game attendance: 64,362
- Referee: Duane Heydt
- TV announcers (ABC): Chris Fowler, Kirk Herbstreit, and Maria Taylor
- Box Score

Game information

Ohio State

- Dwayne Haskins
  24/38, 344 Yds, 2 TD
- J. K. Dobbins
  18 Rush, 121 Yds
- K. J. Hill
  6 Rec, 95 Yds

TCU

- Shawn Robinson
  24/40, 308 Yds, TD, 2 INT
- Darius Anderson
  12 Rush, 154 Yds, 2 TD
- Jalen Reagor
  7 Rec, 98 Yds

Scoring summary

Quarter	Time	Drive			Team	Scoring information	Score	
Quarter	Time	Plays	Yards	TOP	Team	Scoring information	OSU	TCU
1	13:20	7	62	1:40	Ohio State	20-yard field goal by Sean Nuernberger	3	0
1	7:13				Ohio State	Fumble recovered in end zone for touchdown by Davon Hamilton, Sean Nuernberger kick good	10	0
1	4:28	7	84	2:41	TCU	Sewo Olonilua 6-yard touchdown run, Jonathan Song kick good	10	7
2	9:08	2	93	0:20	TCU	Darius Anderson 93-yard touchdown run, Jonathan Song kick good	10	14
2	5:34	10	48	3:27	Ohio State	30-yard field goal by Sean Nuernberger	13	14
3	10:43	3	52	0:53	TCU	Darius Anderson 16-yard touchdown run, Jonathan Song kick good	13	21
3	6:58	2	63	0:16	Ohio State	Parris Campbell 63-yard touchdown reception from Dwayne Haskins, 2-point pass failed	19	21
3	5:54				Ohio State	Interception returned 28 yards for touchdown by Dre'mont Jones, Sean Nuernberger kick good	26	21
3	2:57	2	25	0:30	Ohio State	K. J. Hill 24-yard touchdown reception from Dwayne Haskins, Sean Nuernberger kick good	33	21
3	1:06	5	75	1:51	TCU	TreVontae Hights 51-yard touchdown reception from Shawn Robinson, Jonathan Song kick good	33	28
4	12:30	8	75	3:36	Ohio State	Dwayne Haskins 5-yard touchdown run, Sean Nuernberger kick good	40	28
"TOP" = time of possession. For other American football terms, see Glossary of American football.							40	28

=== Tulane ===
No. 4 Ohio State vs Tulane

Team	1	2	3	4	Total
Tulane	0	6	0	0	6
• No. 4 Ohio State	21	21	0	7	49

- Date: September 22, 2018
- Location:
  Ohio Stadium
  Columbus, OH
- Game start: 3:40 p.m. EDT
- Elapsed time: 3:11
- Game attendance: 103,336
- Game weather: Sunshine
- Referee: Jeff Servinski
- TV announcers: (BTN) Kevin Kugler and Matt Millen

Game Statistics

Statistic	OSU	TU
Total yards	570	256
Passing yards	419	156
Rushing yards	151	100
Penalties	10-89	6-55
Turnovers	0	0
Time of possession	29:00	31:00

Game Leaders

Statistic	Ohio State	Tulane
Passing	Dwayne Haskins (304)	Jonathan Banks (141)
Rushing	J. K. Dobbins (55)	Corey Dauphine (53)
Receiving	Parris Campbell (147)	Darnell Mooney (77)

=== At Penn State ===
#4 Ohio State Buckeyes (4–0) at #9 Penn State Nittany Lions (4–0)

Quarter	1	2	3	4	Total
Ohio St	0	7	7	13	27
Penn St	3	10	0	13	26

at Beaver Stadium • State College, Pennsylvania

- Date: September 29
- Game time: 7:30 p.m. EDT
- Game weather: Clear • 60 °F (16 °C) • Wind NW 4 miles per hour (6.4 km/h; 3.5 kn)
- Game attendance: 110,889
- Referee: Dan Capron
- TV announcers (ABC): Chris Fowler and Kirk Herbstreit
- Box Score

Game information

Ohio St

- Dwayne Haskins
  22/39, 270 Yds, 3 TD, INT
- J. K. Dobbins
  17 Rush, 57 Yds, TD
- Parris Campbell
  7 Rec, 60 Yds

Penn St

- Trace McSorley
  16/32, 286 Yds, 2 TD
  20 Rush, 175 Tds
- K. J. Hamler
  4 Rec, 138 Yds, TD

Scoring summary

Quarter	Time	Drive			Team	Scoring information	Score	
Quarter	Time	Plays	Yards	TOP	Team	Scoring information	OSU	PSU
1	4:58	8	63	3:37	Penn St	34-yard field goal by Jake Pinegar	0	3
2	11:18	4	7	1:30	Penn St	39-yard field goal by Jake Pinegar	0	6
2	5:59	3	98	1:03	Penn St	K. J. Hamler 93-yard touchdown reception from Trace McSorley, Jake Pinegar kick good	0	13
2	1:50	2	25	0:42	Ohio St	J. K. Dobbins 26-yard touchdown reception from Dwayne Haskins, Sean Nuernberger kick good	7	13
3	10:22	13	75	4:38	Ohio St	J. K. Dobbins 4-yard touchdown run, Sean Nuernberger kick good	14	13
4	12:22	6	73	2:22	Penn St	Pat Freiermuth 2-yard touchdown reception from Trace McSorley, Jake Pinegar kick good	14	20
4	8:00				Penn St	Miles Sanders 1-yard touchdown run, 2-point run failed	14	26
4	6:42	3	75	1:18	Ohio St	Binjimen Victor 47-yard touchdown reception from Dwayne Haskins, Sean Nuernberger kick good	21	26
4	2:03	8	96	2:32	Ohio St	K. J. Hill 24-yard touchdown reception from Dwayne Haskins, 2-point pass failed	27	26
"TOP" = time of possession. For other American football terms, see Glossary of American football.							27	26

=== Indiana ===
No. 3 Ohio State vs Indiana

Team	1	2	3	4	Total
Indiana	3	17	6	0	26
• No. 3 Ohio State	7	21	7	14	49

- Date: October 6, 2018
- Location:
  Ohio Stadium
  Columbus, OH
- Game start: 4:05 p.m. EDT
- Elapsed time: 3:43
- Game attendance: 104,193
- Game weather: Partly cloudy
- Referee: Larry Smith
- TV announcers: (FOX): Aaron Goldsmith and Brady Quinn

Game Statistics

Statistic	OSU	IU
Total yards	609	406
Passing yards	455	322
Rushing yards	154	84
Penalties	9-82	3-35
Turnovers	3	2
Time of possession	36:42	23:18

Game Leaders

Statistic	Ohio State	Indiana
Passing	Dwayne Haskins (455)	Peyton Ramsey (322)
Rushing	J. K. Dobbins (82)	Stevie Scott (64)
Receiving	Parris Campbell (142)	Nick Westbrook-Ikhine (109)

=== Minnesota ===
No. 3 Ohio State vs Minnesota

Team	1	2	3	4	Total
Minnesota	7	7	0	0	14
• No. 3 Ohio State	10	7	3	10	30

- Date: October 13, 2018
- Location:
  Ohio Stadium
  Columbus, Ohio
- Game start: 12:05 p.m. EDT
- Elapsed time: 3:13
- Game attendance: 100,042
- Game weather: Cloudy
- Referee: Jerry McGinn
- TV announcers: (FS1): Gus Johnson and Joel Klatt

Game Statistics

Statistic	OSU	MINN
Total yards	504	396
Passing yards	412	218
Rushing yards	92	178
Penalties	5-36	4-60
Turnovers	0	3
Time of possession	31:45	28:15

Game Leaders

Statistic	Ohio State	Minnesota
Passing	Dwayne Haskins (412)	Zack Annexstad (218)
Rushing	Mike Weber (82)	Mohamed Ibrahim (157)
Receiving	K. J. Hill (187)	Tyler Johnson (119)

=== At Purdue ===
#2 Ohio State Buckeyes (7–0) at Purdue Boilermakers (3–3)

Quarter	1	2	3	4	Total
Ohio State	0	3	3	14	20
Purdue	7	7	7	28	49

at Ross-Ade Stadium • West Lafayette, Indiana

- Date: October 20
- Game time: 7:30 p.m.
- Game weather: Clear • 37 °F (3 °C) • Wind NW 18 miles per hour (29 km/h; 16 kn)
- Game attendance: 60,716
- Referee: Mark Kluczynski
- TV announcers (ABC): Chris Fowler, Kirk Herbstreit, Maria Taylor and Tom Rinaldi
- Box Score

Game information

Ohio State

- Dwayne Haskins
  49/73, 470 Yds, 2 TD, INT
- Mike Weber
  9 Rush, 45 Yds
- K. J. Hill
  9 Rec, 105 Yds

Purdue

- David Blough
  25/43, 378 Yds, 3 TD
- D.J. Knox
  16 Rush, 128 Yds, 3 TD
- Rondale Moore
  12 Rec, 170 Yds, 2 TD

Scoring summary

Quarter	Time	Drive			Team	Scoring information	Score	
Quarter	Time	Plays	Yards	TOP	Team	Scoring information	OSU	PUR
1	1:10	15	98	7:09	Purdue	Isaac Zico 13-yard touchdown reception from David Blough, Spencer Evans kick good	0	7
2	14:14	6	48	1:56	Ohio State	24-yard field goal by Blake Haubell	3	7
2	0:27	8	80	1:24	Purdue	Rondale Moore 9-yard touchdown reception from David Blough, Spencer Evans kick good	3	14
3	12:25	10	69	2:35	Ohio State	23-yard field goal by Blake Haubell	6	14
3	8:36	10	73	3:49	Purdue	D.J. Knox 1-yard touchdown run, Spencer Evans kick good	6	21
4	11:39	8	76	3:14	Purdue	D.J. Knox 42-yard touchdown run, Spencer Evans kick good	6	28
4	9:36	8	71	2:03	Ohio State	Johnnie Dixon 32-yard touchdown reception from Dwayne Haskins, Blake Haubell kick good	13	28
4	6:46	5	75	2:50	Purdue	D.J. Knox 40-yard touchdown run, Spencer Evans kick good	13	35
4	4:40	9	70	2:06	Ohio State	Terry McLaurin 34-yard touchdown reception from Dwayne Haskins, Blake Haubell kick good	20	35
4	3:37	3	46	1:03	Purdue	Rondale Moore 43-yard touchdown reception from David Blough, Spencer Evans kick good	20	42
4	2:08				Purdue	Interception returned 41 yards for touchdown by Markus Bailey, Spencer Evans kick good	20	49
"TOP" = time of possession. For other American football terms, see Glossary of American football.							20	49

=== Nebraska ===
No. 8 Ohio State vs Nebraska

Team	1	2	3	4	Total
Nebraska	7	14	0	10	31
• No. 8 Ohio State	16	0	14	6	36

- Date: November 3, 2018
- Location:
  Ohio Stadium
  Columbus, Ohio
- Game start: 12:05 p.m. EDT
- Elapsed time: 3:40
- Game attendance: 104,245
- Game weather: Mostly sunny
- Referee: Ron Snodgrass
- TV announcers: (FOX): Joe Davis and Brady Quinn

Game Statistics

Statistic	OSU	NEB
Total yards	481	450
Passing yards	252	266
Rushing yards	229	184
Penalties	6-46	5-44
Turnovers	3	1
Time of possession	26:27	33:33

Game Leaders

Statistic	Ohio State	Nebraska
Passing	Dwayne Haskins (252)	Adrian Martinez (266)
Rushing	J. K. Dobbins (163)	Devine Ozigbo (86)
Receiving	Johnnie Dixon (96)	Stanley Morgan Jr. (87)

=== At Michigan State ===
No. 8 Ohio State at No. 24 Michigan State

Team	1	2	3	4	Total
• No. 8 Ohio State	0	7	2	17	26
No. 24 Michigan State	0	3	3	0	6

- Date: November 10, 2018
- Location:
  Spartan Stadium
  East Lansing, Michigan
- Game start: 12:05 p.m. EDT
- Elapsed time: 3:32
- Game attendance: 74,633
- Game weather: 33 °F (1 °C), Overcast & Flurries, WNW 14 miles per hour (23 km/h)
- Referee: John O'Neil
- TV announcers (FOX): Gus Johnson and Joel Klatt

Game Statistics

Statistic	OSU	MSU
Total yards	347	274
Passing yards	227	220
Rushing yards	120	54
Penalties	4-30	7-46
Turnovers	1	3
Time of possession	37:29	22:30

Game Leaders

Statistic	Ohio State	Michigan State
Passing	Dwayne Haskins (227)	Brian Lewerke (128)
Rushing	Mike Weber (104)	Rocky Lombardi (49)
Receiving	Terry McLaurin (63)	Cody White (115)

=== At Maryland ===
#9 Ohio State Buckeyes (9–1) at Maryland Terrapins (5–5)

Quarter	1	2	3	4	OT	Total
Ohio St	3	14	7	21	7	52
Maryland	17	7	7	14	6	51

at Capital One Field at Maryland Stadium • College Park, Maryland

- Date: November 17
- Game time: 12:00 p.m. EDT
- Game weather: Sunny
- Game attendance: 38,177
- Referee: Mark Kluczynski
- TV announcers (ABC): Dave Pasch and Greg McElroy
- Box Score Final

Game information

Ohio State

- Dwayne Haskins
  28/38, 405 Yds, 3 TD, INT
- J. K. Dobbins
  37 Rush, 203 Yds, TD
- Terry McLaurin
  4 Rec, 118 Yds, TD

Maryland

- Tyrell Pigrome
  6/13, 181 Yds, TD
- Anthony McFarland Jr.
  21 Rush, 298 Yds, 2 TD
- Darryl Jones
  2 Rec, 68 Yds

Scoring summary

Quarter	Time	Drive			Team	Scoring information	Score	
Quarter	Time	Plays	Yards	TOP	Team	Scoring information	OSU	MD
1	14:10	2	80	0:50	Maryland	Anthony McFarland 81-yard touchdown run, Joseph Petrino kick good	0	7
1	9:10	10	52	4:45	Ohio State	36-yard field goal by Blake Haubell	3	7
1	9:05	1	75	0:11	Maryland	Anthony McFarland 75-yard touchdown run, Joseph Petrino kick good	3	14
1	2:06	6	57	2:07	Maryland	36-yard field goal by Joseph Petrino	3	17
2	10:21	1	68	0:11	Ohio State	Terry McLaurin 68-yard touchdown reception from Dwayne Haskins, Blake Haubell kick good	10	17
2	6:02	8	60	4:14	Maryland	Javon Leake 14-yard touchdown run, Joseph Petrino kick good	10	24
2	3:13	8	75	2:49	Ohio State	J. K. Dobbins 1-yard touchdown run, Blake Haubell kick good	17	24
3	14:15				Maryland	Interception returned 37 yards for touchdown by RaVon Davie, Joseph Petrino kick good	17	31
3	11:35	8	73	2:36	Ohio State	Dwayne Haskins 2-yard touchdown run, Blake Haubell kick good	24	31
4	12:25	7	44	2:30	Ohio State	K. J. Hill 6-yard touchdown reception from Dwayne Haskins, Blake Haubell kick good	31	31
4	7:50	9	83	4:31	Maryland	Jeshaun Jones 27-yard touchdown reception from Tyrrell Pigrome, Joseph Petrino kick good	31	38
4	3:41	12	75	4:09	Ohio State	Dwayne Haskins 1-yard touchdown run, Blake Haubell kick good	38	38
4	1:41				Maryland	Fumble recovered in end zone for touchdown by Chigoziem Okonkwo, Joseph Petrino kick good	38	45
4	0:40	7	50	0:52	Ohio State	Benjamin Victor 3-yard touchdown reception from Dwayne Haskins, Blake Haubell kick good	45	45
OT		5	25		Ohio State	Dwayne Haskins 5-yard touchdown run, Blake Haubell kick good	52	45
OT		2	25		Maryland	Tayon Fleet-Davis 1-yard touchdown run, 2-point pass failed	52	51
"TOP" = time of possession. For other American football terms, see Glossary of American football.							52	51

=== Michigan ===
#4 Michigan Wolverines (10–1) at #10 Ohio State Buckeyes (10–1)

Quarter	1	2	3	4	Total
Michigan	3	16	0	20	39
Ohio State	7	17	17	21	62

at Ohio Stadium • Columbus, Ohio

- Date: November 24
- Game time: 12:00 p.m. EDT
- Game weather: Cloudy • 48 °F (9 °C) • Wind 11 miles per hour (18 km/h; 9.6 kn)
- Game attendance: 106,588
- Referee: Mike Cannon
- TV announcers (Fox): Gus Johnson, Joel Klatt and Jenny Taft
- Box Score

Game information

Michigan

- Shea Patterson
  20/34, 187 Yds, 3 TD, INT
- Karan Higdon
  15 Rush, 72 Yds
- Nico Collins
  4 Rec, 91 Yds, 2 TD

Ohio State

- Dwayne Haskins
  20/31, 396 Yds, 6 TD
- Mike Weber
  13 Rush, 96 Yds, TD
- Parris Campbell
  6 Rec, 192 Yds, 2 TD

Scoring summary

Quarter	Time	Drive			Team	Scoring information	Score	
Quarter	Time	Plays	Yards	TOP	Team	Scoring information	MICH	OSU
1	11:29	6	57	1:57	Ohio State	Chris Olave 24-yard touchdown reception from Dwayne Haskins, Blake Haubell kick good	0	7
1	6:22	10	44	5:00	Michigan	39-yard field goal by Jake Moody	3	7
2	14:51	12	52	5:41	Michigan	31-yard field goal by Jake Moody	6	7
2	9:08	9	80	2:59	Ohio State	Chris Olave 24-yard touchdown reception from Dwayne Haskins, Blake Haubell kick good	6	14
2	3:18	8	79	2:29	Ohio State	Johnnie Dixon 31-yard touchdown reception from Dwayne Haskins, Blake Haubell kick good	6	21
2	0:47	8	79	2:29	Michigan	Nico Collins 23-yard touchdown reception from Shea Patterson, Jake Moody kick good	13	21
2	0:41	1	9	0:04	Michigan	Chris Evans 9-yard touchdown reception from Shea Patterson, 2-point pass failed	19	21
2	0:00	7	74	0:41	Ohio State	19-yard field goal by Blake Haubell	19	24
3	8:25	9	56	3:45	Ohio State	19-yard field goal by Blake Haubell	19	27
3	4:41				Ohio State	Blocked punt returned 33 yards for touchdown by Sevyn Banks, Blake Haubell kick good	19	34
3	3:10	2	22	0:35	Ohio State	Mike Weber 2-yard touchdown run, Blake Haubell kick good	19	41
4	14:11	8	75	3:59	Michigan	Nico Collins 12-yard touchdown reception from Shea Patterson, 2-point pass failed	25	41
4	13:55	1	78	0:11	Ohio State	Parris Campbell 78-yard touchdown reception from Dwayne Haskins, Blake Haubell kick good	25	48
4	9:35	11	86	4:13	Michigan	Ben Mason 1-yard touchdown run, Jake Moody kick good	32	48
4	6:59	6	75	2:36	Ohio State	K. J. Hill 1-yard touchdown reception from Dwayne Haskins, Blake Haubell kick good	32	55
4	5:26	3	19	1:16	Ohio State	Parris Campbell 16-yard touchdown reception from Dwayne Haskins, Blake Haubell kick good	32	62
4	3:16	6	75	2:10	Michigan	Joe Milton 4-yard touchdown run, Jake Moody kick good	39	62
"TOP" = time of possession. For other American football terms, see Glossary of American football.							39	62

=== Big Ten Championship Game ===
No. 21 Northwestern vs. No. 6 Ohio State
(Big Ten Championship Game)

Team	1	2	3	4	Total
No. 21 Northwestern	7	0	14	3	24
• No. 6 Ohio State	14	10	7	14	45

- Date: December 1, 2018
- Location:
  Lucas Oil Stadium
  Indianapolis, Indiana
- Game start: 8:18 p.m. EDT
- Elapsed time: 3:33
- Game attendance: 66,375
- Game weather: n/a
- Referee: Ron Snodgrass
- TV announcers: (FOX): Gus Johnson and Joel Klatt

Game Statistics

Statistic	OSU	NW
Total yards	607	418
Passing yards	499	267
Rushing yards	108	151
Penalties	9-90	3-15
Turnovers	2	3
Time of possession	35:52	24:08

Game Leaders

Statistic	Ohio State	Northwestern
Passing	Dwayne Haskins (499)	Clayton Thorson (267)
Rushing	J. K. Dobbins (68)	John Moten (76)
Receiving	Johnnie Dixon (129)	Kyric McGowan (50)

=== Rose Bowl ===
Rose Bowl: #5 Ohio State Buckeyes vs. #9 Washington Huskies

Quarter	1	2	3	4	Total
Washington	3	0	0	20	23
Ohio State	7	14	7	0	28

at Rose Bowl • Pasadena, California

- Date: January 1, 2019
- Game time: 5:00 p.m. EDT
- Game weather: Sunny • 60 °F (16 °C) • Wind 6 miles per hour (9.7 km/h; 5.2 kn) N
- Game attendance: 91,853
- Referee: John McDaid
- TV announcers (ESPN): Chris Fowler, Kirk Herbstreit, Maria Taylor and Tom Rinaldi
- Box Score

Game information

Washington

- Jake Browning
  35/54, 313 Yds
- Myles Gaskin
  24 Rush, 121 Yds, 2 TD
- Andre Baccellia
  12 Rec, 109 Yds

Ohio State

- Dwayne Haskins
  25/37, 251 Yds, 3 TD
- Mike Weber
  15 Rush, 96 Yds
- Parris Campbell
  11 Rec, 71 Yds, TD

Scoring summary

Quarter	Time	Drive			Team	Scoring information	Score	
Quarter	Time	Plays	Yards	TOP	Team	Scoring information	WASH	OSU
1	9:04	11	77	2:45	Ohio State	Parris Campbell 12-yard touchdown reception from Dwayne Haskins, Blake Haubell kick good	0	7
1	1:19	11	55	4:57	Washington	38-yard field goal by Peyton Henry	3	7
2	12:23	10	75	3:56	Ohio State	Johnnie Dixon 19-yard touchdown reception from Dwayne Haskins, Blake Haubell kick good	3	14
2	0:14	5	57	0:46	Ohio State	Rashod Berry 1-yard touchdown reception from Dwayne Haskins, Blake Haubell kick good	3	21
3	8:23	7	80	2:02	Ohio State	J. K. Dobbins 3-yard touchdown run, Blake Haubell kick good	3	28
4	12:17	10	66	4:38	Washington	Drew Sample 1-yard touchdown reception from Myles Gaskin, Peyton Henry kick good	10	28
4	6:42	5	66	1:30	Washington	Myles Gaskin 1-yard touchdown run, Peyton Henry kick good	17	28
4	0:42	10	71	2:08	Washington	Myles Gaskin 2-yard touchdown run, 2-point pass failed	23	28
"TOP" = time of possession. For other American football terms, see Glossary of American football.							23	28

== Awards and honors ==
All-Conference Honors
Player	Position	Coaches	Media	AP
Dwayne Haskins	QB	1st Team	1st Team	1st Team
Dre'Mont Jones	DL	1st Team	2nd Team	1st Team
Parris Campbell	WR	1st Team	2nd Team	2nd Team
Isaiah Prince	OT	1st Team	1st Team	1st Team
J. K. Dobbins	RB	2nd Team	HM	
Michael Jordan	C	2nd Team	2nd Team	2nd Team
Chase Young	DL	2nd Team	3rd Team	
Drue Chrisman	P	2nd Team	2nd Team	2nd Team
Jordan Fuller	S	HM	2nd Team	2nd Team
K. J. Hill	WR	HM	3rd Team	
Mike Weber	RB	HM		
Malcolm Pridgeon	OG	HM	HM	
Demetrius Knox	OG	HM	3rd Team	
Kendall Sheffield	CB	HM	HM	
Damon Arnette	CB	HM	HM	
Jeff Okudah	CB	HM		
Jonathon Cooper	DL	HM	HM	
Malik Harrison	LB	HM	HM	
Robert Landers	DL	HM		
Terry McLaurin	WR		HM	
Tuf Borland	LB	HM	HM	
Nick Bosa	DL		HM	
Thayer Munford	OT		HM	
Pete Werner	LB		HM	

Weekly Awards
Player	Award	Date Awarded	Ref.
Dwayne Haskins	Big Ten Offensive Player of the Week	September 3, 2018	
Nick Bosa	Bednarik Award Player of the Week	September 5, 2018	
Tate Martell	Big Ten Co-Freshman of the Week	September 10, 2018	
Dre'Mont Jones	Big Ten Defensive Player of the Week	September 17, 2018	
Dwayne Haskins	Big Ten Co-offensive Player of the Week	September 24, 2018	
Drue Chrisman	Ray Guy Award Punter of the Week	September 30, 2018	
Dwayne Haskins	Big Ten Offensive Player of the Week	October 1, 2018	
Chase Young	Big Ten Co-defensive Player of the Week	October 1, 2018	
Chase Young	Bednarik Award Player of the Week	October 2, 2018	
Dwayne Haskins	Big Ten Offensive Player of the Week	October 8, 2018	
Dwayne Haskins	Big Ten Offensive Player of the Week	November 19, 2018	
Dwayne Haskins	Big Ten Offensive Player of the Week	November 26, 2018	
Chris Olave	247Sports True Freshman of the Week	November 26, 2018	

Annual Awards
Player	Award	Date Awarded	Ref.
Dwayne Haskins	Graham-George Offensive Player of the Year	November 28, 2018	
Dwayne Haskins	Griese-Brees Quarterback of the Year	November 28, 2018	
Dwayne Haskins	Chicago Tribune Silver Football	November 30, 2018	
Dwayne Haskins	AP Big Ten Offensive Player of the Year	December 5, 2018	
Dwayne Haskins	Sammy Baugh Top Passer Award	December 2018	
Dwayne Haskins	Chic Harley Player of the Year Award	December 2018	
Dwayne Haskins	Kellen Moore Quarterback of the Year Award	December 2018	
Johnnie Dixon	Big Ten Sportsmanship Award	November 27, 2018	

NCAA Recognized All-American Honors
Player	Position	AFCA	AP	FWAA	Sporting News	WCFF	Designation
Dwayne Haskins	QB		3rd Team				
Michael Jordan	C		3rd Team			2nd Team	

*The NCAA and Ohio State only recognize the AP, AFCA, FWAA, Sporting News and WCFF All-American teams to determine if a player is a Consensus or Unanimous All-American. To be named a Consensus All-American, a player must be named first team in three polls and to be Unanimous, they must be named first team in all five.

Other All-American Honors
Player	Position	Athletic	Athlon	Bleacher Report	CBS Sports	CFN	ESPN	FOX Sports	Phil Steele	Scout	SI	USA Today
Michael Jordan	C				1st Team	HM					1st Team	
Dre'Mont Jones	DT					1st Team						
Dwayne Haskins	QB					HM						
Isaiah Prince	OG					HM						

== Players drafted into the NFL ==
Round	Pick	Player	Position	NFL Club
1	2	Nick Bosa	DE	San Francisco 49ers
1	15	Dwayne Haskins	QB	Washington Redskins
2	59	Parris Campbell	WR	Indianapolis Colts
3	71	Dre'Mont Jones	DT	Denver Broncos
3	76	Terry McLaurin	WR	Washington Redskins
4	111	Kendall Sheffield	CB	Atlanta Falcons
4	136	Michael Jordan	C	Cincinnati Bengals
6	202	Isaiah Prince	OT	Miami Dolphins
7	218	Mike Weber	RB	Dallas Cowboys
