= 2017 All-Big Ten Conference football team =

American college football all-star team

The 2017 All-Big Ten Conference football team consists of American football players chosen as All-Big Ten Conference players for the 2017 Big Ten Conference football season. The conference recognizes two official All-Big Ten selectors: (1) the Big Ten conference coaches selected separate offensive and defensive units and named first-, second- and third-team players (the "Coaches" team); and (2) a panel of sports writers and broadcasters covering the Big Ten also selected offensive and defensive units and named first-, second- and third-team players (the "Media" team).

== Offensive selections ==
=== Quarterbacks ===
- J. T. Barrett, Ohio State (Coaches-1; Media-1)
- Trace McSorley, Penn State (Coaches-2; Media-2)
- Clayton Thorson, Northwestern (Coaches-3; Media-3)

=== Running backs ===
- Saquon Barkley, Penn State (Coaches-1; Media-1)
- Jonathan Taylor, Wisconsin (Coaches-1; Media-1)
- Justin Jackson, Northwestern (Coaches-2; Media-2)
- J. K. Dobbins, Ohio State (Coaches-2; Media-2)
- Akrum Wadley, Iowa (Coaches-3; Media-3)
- Karan Higdon, Michigan (Coaches-3; Media-3)

=== Wide receivers ===
- Simmie Cobbs, Indiana (Coaches-1; Media-1)
- D. J. Moore, Maryland (Coaches-1; Media-1)
- Stanley Morgan Jr., Nebraska (Coaches-2; Media-2)
- DaeSean Hamilton, Penn State (Coaches-2; Media-3)
- Felton Davis III, Michigan State (Coaches-3; Media-2)
- Parris Campbell, Ohio State (Coaches-3)
- JD Spielman, Nebraska (Media-3)

=== Centers ===
- Billy Price, Ohio State (Coaches-1; Media-1)
- Brian Allen, Michigan State (Coaches-2; Media-2)
- Tyler Biadasz, Wisconsin (Coaches-3; Media-3)

=== Guards ===
- Beau Benzschawel, Wisconsin (Coaches-1; Media-1)
- Michael Jordan, Ohio State (Coaches-1; Media-2)
- Sean Welsh, Iowa (Coaches-2; Media-1)
- Ben Bredeson, Michigan (Coaches-2; Media-2)
- David Beedle, Michigan State (Coaches-3; Media-3)
- Tommy Doles, Northwestern (Coaches-3; Media-3)

=== Tackles ===
- Jamarco Jones, Ohio State (Coaches-1; Media-1)
- Michael Deiter, Wisconsin (Coaches-1; Media-1)
- Mason Cole, Michigan (Coaches-2; Media-2)
- David Edwards, Wisconsin (Coaches-2; Media-2)
- Isaiah Prince, Ohio State (Coaches-3; Media-3)
- Ryan Bates, Penn State (Coaches-3; Media-3)

=== Tight ends ===
- Troy Fumagalli, Wisconsin (Coaches-1; Media-2)
- Mike Gesicki, Penn State (Coaches-2; Media-1)
- Noah Fant, Iowa (Coaches-3; Media-3)

== Defensive selections ==
=== Defensive linemen ===
- Nick Bosa, Ohio State (Coaches-1; Media-1)
- Tyquan Lewis, Ohio State (Coaches-1; Media-1)
- Maurice Hurst, Michigan (Coaches-1; Media-1)
- Rashan Gary, Michigan (Coaches-1; Media-2)
- Chase Winovich, Michigan (Coaches-2; Media-1)
- Sam Hubbard, Ohio State (Coaches-2; Media-2)
- Alec James, Wisconsin (Coaches-2; Media-2)
- Conor Sheehy, Wisconsin (Coaches-2; Media-3)
- Joe Gaziano, Northwestern (Coaches-3; Media-2)
- Kenny Willekes, Michigan State (Coaches-3; Media-3)
- Dre'Mont Jones, Ohio State (Coaches-3)
- Gelen Robinson, Purdue (Coaches-3)
- Anthony Nelson, Iowa (Media-3)
- Shareef Miller, Penn State (Media-3)

=== Linebackers ===
- Josey Jewell, Iowa (Coaches-1; Media-1)
- T. J. Edwards, Wisconsin (Coaches-1; Media-1)
- Devin Bush, Michigan (Coaches-1; Media-2)
- Tegray Scales, Indiana (Coaches-2; Media-1)
- Garret Dooley, Wisconsin (Coaches-2; Media-3)
- Jason Cabinda, Penn State (Coaches-2)
- Khaleke Hudson, Michigan (Coaches-3; Media-2)
- Paddy Fisher, Northwestern (Coaches-3; Media-2)
- Joe Bachie, Michigan State (Coaches-3; Media-3)
- Thomas Barber, Minnesota (Media-3)

=== Defensive backs ===
- Josh Jackson, Iowa (Coaches-1; Media-1)
- Nick Nelson, Wisconsin (Coaches-1; Media-1)
- Marcus Allen, Penn State (Coaches-1; Media-2)
- D'Cota Dixon, Wisconsin (Coaches-1; Media-3)
- Denzel Ward, Ohio State (Coaches-2; Media-1)
- David Dowell, Michigan State (Media-1)
- Rashard Fant, Indiana (Coaches-3; Media-2)
- Godwin Igwebuike, Northwestern (Coaches-2; Media-2)
- Amani Oruwariye, Penn State (Coaches-2; Media-2)
- Kyle Queiro, Northwestern (Coaches-3; Media-3)
- Lavert Hill, Michigan (Coaches-2)
- Jordan Fuller, Ohio State (Coaches-3)
- Derrick Tindal, Wisconsin (Coaches-3)
- Josiah Scott, Michigan State (Media-3)
- Damon Webb, Ohio State (Media-3)

== Special teams ==
=== Kickers ===
- Griffin Oakes, Indiana (Coaches-1; Media-1)
- Rafael Gaglianone, Wisconsin (Coaches-2; Media-2)
- Sean Nuernberger, Ohio State (Coaches-3; Media-3)

=== Punters ===
- Ryan Anderson, Rutgers (Coaches-1; Media-1)
- Blake Gillikin, Penn State (Coaches-2; Media-2)
- Drue Chrisman, Ohio State (Coaches-3; Media-3)

=== Return specialist ===
- Saquon Barkley, Penn State (Coaches-1; Media-1)
- DeAndre Thompkins, Penn State (Coaches-2; Media-3)
- Parris Campbell, Ohio State (Coaches-3; Media-2)

== Key ==
Bold = Consensus first-team selection by both the coaches and media

Coaches = Selected by the Big Ten Conference coaches

Media = Selected by the conference media

== See also ==
- 2017 College Football All-America Team
