= Jake Browning =

American football player (born 1996)

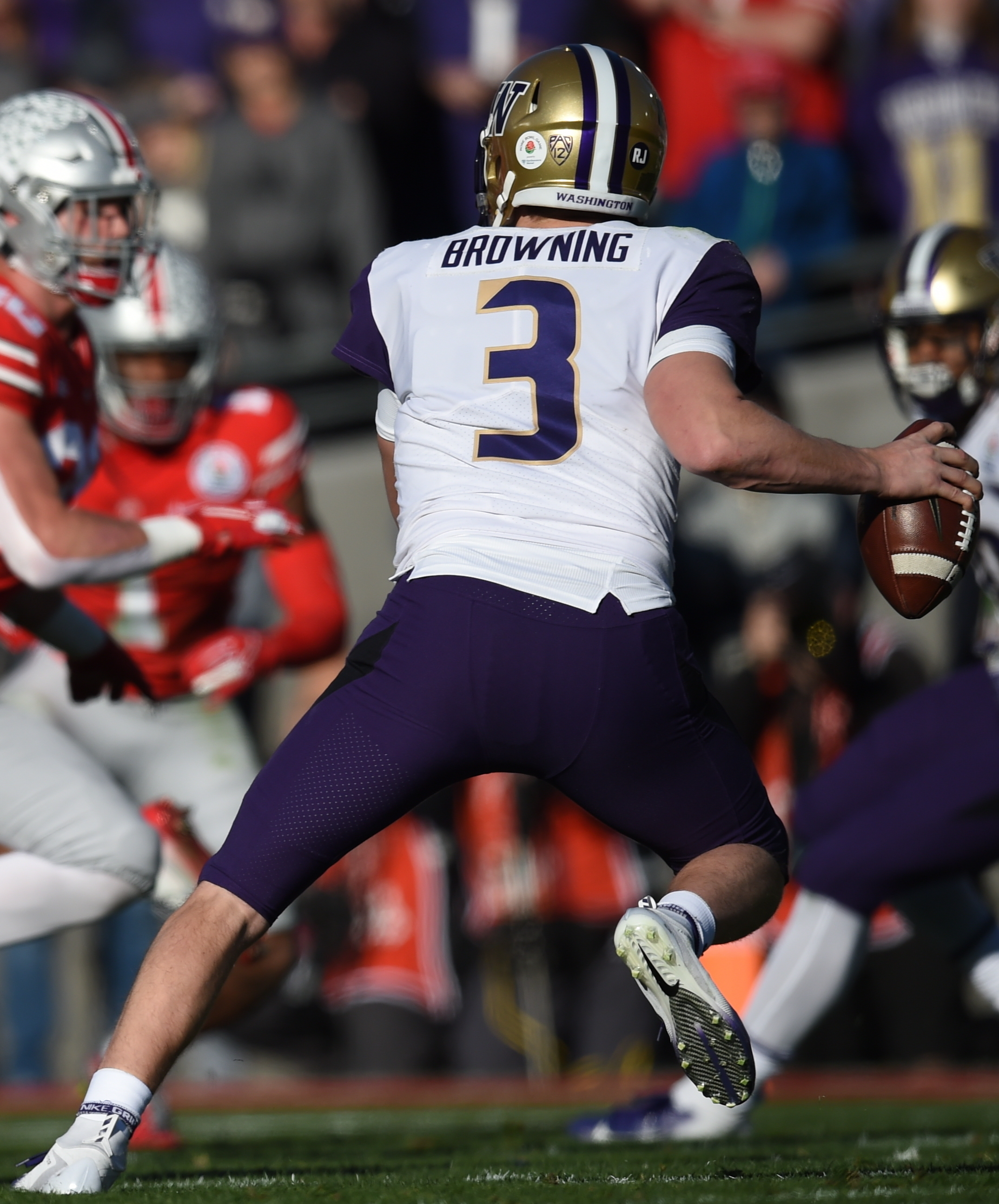
- Browning with the Washington Huskies in 2019

No. 13 – Los Angeles Chargers
- Position: Quarterback
- Roster status: Practice squad

Personal information
- Born: April 11, 1996 (age 30); Folsom, California, U.S.
- Listed height: 6 ft 2 in (1.88 m)
- Listed weight: 210 lb (95 kg)

Career information
- High school: Folsom
- College: Washington (2015–2018)
- NFL draft: 2019: undrafted

Career history
- Minnesota Vikings (2019–2021)*; Cincinnati Bengals (2021–2025); Tampa Bay Buccaneers (2026)*; Los Angeles Chargers (2026–present)*
- * Offseason or practice squad member only

Awards and highlights
- NFL completion percentage leader (2023); Pac-12 Offensive Player of the Year (2016); First-team All-Pac-12 (2016)

Career NFL statistics as of 2025
- Passing attempts: 368
- Passing completions: 252
- Completion percentage: 68.5%
- TD–INT: 18–15
- Passing yards: 2,707
- Passer rating: 89.1
- Stats at Pro Football Reference

Jacob Christopher Browning (born April 11, 1996) is an American professional football quarterback for the Los Angeles Chargers of the National Football League (NFL). He played college football for the Washington Huskies and signed with the Minnesota Vikings as an undrafted free agent in 2019.

== Early life ==
Browning attended Folsom High School in Folsom, California. At Folsom, he had a 4.0 grade point average and set national and state high school records. In 46 games, Browning completed 1,191 of 1,708 attempts for 16,775 yards and 229 touchdowns, all California records. The 229 touchdowns also broke the national record held by Maty Mauk. As a senior, Browning threw for a national-record 91 touchdown passes. He also passed for a California record of 5,790 yards, which broke his record from his junior year. Browning was the Gatorade Football Player of the Year during his junior and senior years.

Browning was rated as a four-star recruit by Rivals.com and was ranked as the third-best pro-style recruit in his class. He committed to the University of Washington to play college football. Browning studied at the university's Foster School of Business, as a direct admit into their Business Administration program his freshman year.

== College career ==
=== Freshman ===
In his first year at Washington, Browning became the second ever (in any game) true freshman to start at the quarterback position at UW (the other was Marques Tuiasosopo against Oregon in 1997) and the first true freshman to start a season opener for the Huskies. In his first career start, Browning completed 20-of-34 passes for 150 yards and an interception.

=== Sophomore ===
As a sophomore, Browning performed on a much higher level, guiding UW to a 12–2 record, and the Huskies' first conference championship since 2000. He set a new record for touchdowns per attempt at 12.2%. On November 29, Browning was named Pac-12 Offensive Player of the Year and first-team all-Pac-12. He came in sixth in the 2016 Heisman Trophy voting, narrowly missing an invitation to attend the award ceremony in New York City. Browning's sixth-place finish is the third-best Heisman voting finish in school history, behind Michael Penix Jr. who finished second and Steve Emtman who finished fourth.

Browning underwent shoulder surgery on his throwing arm two weeks after facing Alabama in the College Football Playoff. His injury was kept secret for nearly two months, and some commentators have speculated as to a connection between the injury and Browning's reduced performance in the later portion of the season.

=== Junior ===
Browning started all 13 games of the 2017 season at quarterback, was named to the Academic All-Pac-12 second-team, was an honorable mention All-Pac-12, and broke the UW career touchdown passes record this year. Browning completed 230 of his attempted 336 throws, which was his highest throwing percentage. He threw for 2,719 yards, 19 touchdowns, and five interceptions.

=== Senior ===
On September 29, 2018, Browning became the school's all-time passing leader, against BYU. With the Pac-12 North Division title on the line, he led Washington against in-state rival and seventh-ranked Washington State on the road in the 111th Apple Cup. The Huskies won their second Pac-12 title in three years by defeating Utah in the 2018 Pac-12 Football Championship Game. The team was invited to the Rose Bowl, where they were defeated by Ohio State to end the year at 10–4, 7–2 in conference play. Browning finished the season with 3,192 passing yards, 16 touchdowns, and 10 interceptions.

== Professional career ==
Pre-draft measurables
Height	Weight	Arm length	Hand span	Wingspan	40-yard dash	10-yard split	20-yard split	20-yard shuttle	Three-cone drill	Vertical jump	Broad jump
6 ft 1 7/8 in (1.88 m)	211 lb (96 kg)	32 1/2 in (0.83 m)	9 in (0.23 m)	6 ft 4 1/2 in (1.94 m)	4.74 s	1.60 s	2.76 s	4.44 s	7.19 s	29 in (0.74 m)	9 ft 4 in (2.84 m)
All values from NFL Combine

=== Minnesota Vikings ===
==== 2019 ====
On April 29, 2019, Browning signed with the Minnesota Vikings as an undrafted free agent. He was waived on August 31, but was signed to the practice squad the next day. After the Vikings lost to the San Francisco 49ers in the Divisional Round, Browning signed a reserve/future contract with the Vikings on January 12, 2020.

==== 2020 ====
Browning was waived by the Vikings during final roster cuts on September 5, 2020, but was re-signed to the Vikings practice squad the next day. He signed a reserve/future contract with the Vikings on January 4, 2021.

==== 2021 ====
On August 31, 2021, Browning was waived by the Vikings during final roster cuts.

=== Cincinnati Bengals ===
==== 2021 ====
On September 7, 2021, Browning was signed to the Cincinnati Bengals practice squad. After the team lost Super Bowl LVI to the Los Angeles Rams, he signed a reserve/future contract on February 15, 2022.

==== 2022 ====
Browning competed for the backup quarterback job during the preseason, but was beat out by Brandon Allen. Browning was waived on August 30, 2022, but was signed to the practice squad the next day. After the Bengals lost to the Kansas City Chiefs in the AFC Championship Game, Browning signed a reserve/future contract on January 31, 2023.

==== 2023 ====
Browning competed with Trevor Siemian to be the Bengals' backup quarterback throughout training camp and eventually won the job after the third preseason game.

During the season-opening 24–3 road loss to the Cleveland Browns, Browning had his first regular-season snap in the final minutes of the fourth quarter, throwing an incomplete pass. During Week 11 against the Baltimore Ravens on Thursday Night Football, Browning came in to relieve an injured Joe Burrow, throwing for 68 yards and a touchdown while also rushing for 40 yards in the 34–20 road loss. The next day, it was revealed that Burrow suffered a season-ending injury to his throwing wrist, elevating Browning to the starting role.

During Week 12 against the Pittsburgh Steelers, Browning made his first career start and finished the 16–10 loss completing 19-of-26 passes for 227 yards, a touchdown, and an interception. In the next game against the Jacksonville Jaguars on Monday Night Football, Browning completed 32-of-37 passes for 354 yards and a touchdown while also rushing twice for 22 yards and a touchdown during the 34–31 overtime road victory. His 86.5 percent completion rate is the highest all-time in a quarterback's first or second career start. Browning was named AFC Offensive Player of the Week for his performance. The following week against the Indianapolis Colts, Browning had 275 passing yards, two touchdowns, and an interception to go along with seven rushing yards and a touchdown during the 34–14 victory.

During Week 15 against his former team, the Minnesota Vikings, Browning led a 14-point comeback that included two fourth quarter touchdown passes to Tee Higgins. Browning finished the 27–24 overtime victory throwing for 324 yards, the two aforementioned touchdowns, and an interception. With this win, Browning became the first Bengals quarterback since Boomer Esiason to win three of his first four starts. In the next game against the Steelers, Browning struggled as he threw for 335 yards, a touchdown, and three interceptions during the 34–11 road loss. The following week against the Chiefs, Browning had 197 passing yards and a touchdown to go along with 32 rushing yards and a touchdown in the 25–17 road loss. During the regular-season finale against the Browns, he completed 18-of-24 passes for 156 yards, three touchdowns, and an interception in the 31–14 victory.

Browning finished the 2023 season with 1,936 passing yards, 12 touchdowns, and seven interceptions to go along with 27 carries for 127 yards and three touchdowns in nine games and seven starts.

==== 2024 ====
Browning re-signed with the Bengals on a two-year contract on April 23, 2024. He was once again named the backup quarterback to start the season.

==== 2025 ====
During a Week 2 31–27 comeback victory over the Jaguars, starting quarterback Joe Burrow went down with a turf toe injury in the second quarter. Browning played the rest of the game and completed 21-of-32 passes for 241 yards, two touchdowns, and three interceptions while also rushing for the game-winning touchdown. Following the victory, Browning was announced as the Bengals' starting quarterback in Burrow's absence, and head coach Zac Taylor said that the team had full confidence in him.

Browning made his first start of the season in Week 3 against his former team, the Vikings, and finished the 48–10 road loss with 140 passing yards, a touchdown, and two interceptions.

After back-to-back blowout losses to the Denver Broncos and Detroit Lions where Browning threw for four touchdowns and eight interceptions, the Bengals traded a 2026 fifth round pick to the division rival Cleveland Browns for Joe Flacco and a 2026 sixth round pick on October 7. Flacco was announced as the new starting quarterback for the Bengals the next day, and Browning returned to the bench.

=== Tampa Bay Buccaneers ===
On March 13, 2026, Browning signed a one-year, $1.3 million contract with the Tampa Bay Buccaneers. He was released by the Buccaneers on August 30, after Jalon Daniels won the backup quarterback job.

=== Los Angeles Chargers ===
On October 13, 2026, Browning signed with the Los Angeles Chargers practice squad.

== Career statistics ==
=== NFL ===
Legend
	Led the league
**Bold**	Career high

Year	Team	Games			Passing									Rushing					Sacks		Fumbles	
Year	Team	GP	GS	Record	Cmp	Att	Pct	Yds	Y/A	Lng	TD	Int	Rtg	Att	Yds	Y/A	Lng	TD	Sck	SckY	Fum	Lost
2019	MIN	0	0	—	DNP																	
2020	MIN	0	0	—	DNP																	
2021	CIN	0	0	—	DNP																	
2022	CIN	0	0	—	DNP																	
2023	CIN	9	7	**4−3**	**171**	**243**	**70.4**	**1,936**	**8.0**	**80**	**12**	**7**	**98.4**	**27**	**127**	**4.7**	**21**	**3**	**24**	**169**	**3**	0
2024	CIN	3	0	—	0	0	0.0	0	0.0	0	0	0	0.0	2	-2	-1.0	-1	0	0	0	0	0
2025	CIN	5	3	0−3	81	125	68.5	771	6.2	64	6	8	70.5	9	39	4.3	13	1	9	60	1	0
Career		17	10	4−6	252	368	68.5	2,707	7.4	80	18	15	89.1	38	164	4.3	21	4	33	229	4	0

=== College ===
Year	Team	Games			Passing								Rushing			
Year	Team	GP	GS	Record	Cmp	Att	Pct	Yds	Avg	TD	Int	Rtg	Att	Yds	Avg	TD
2015	Washington	12	12	7–5	233	369	63.1	2,955	8.0	16	**10**	139.7	65	35	0.5	1
2016	Washington	**14**	**14**	**12–2**	243	**391**	62.1	**3,430**	**8.8**	**43**	9	**167.5**	65	45	0.7	4
2017	Washington	13	13	10–3	230	336	**68.5**	2,719	8.1	19	5	152.1	56	25	0.4	**7**
2018	Washington	**14**	**14**	10–4	**252**	388	64.9	3,192	8.2	16	**10**	142.5	**85**	**139**	**1.6**	4
Career		53	53	39–14	958	1,484	64.6	12,296	8.3	94	34	150.5	271	244	0.9	16

=== High school ===
Year	Team	Games		Passing						
Year	Team	GP	Record	Cmp	Att	Pct	Yds	TD	Int	Rtg
2012	Folsom	15	14–1	391	605	64.6	5,248	63	16	116.0
2013	Folsom	15	14–1	**440**	**579**	**76.0**	5,737	75	**17**	134.0
2014	Folsom	**16**	**16–0**	360	524	68.7	**5,790**	**91**	7	**139.4**
Career		46	44–2	1,191	1,708	69.7	16,775	229	40	130.9

== See also ==
- Washington Huskies football statistical leaders
