= Dre'Mont Jones =

American football player (born 1997)

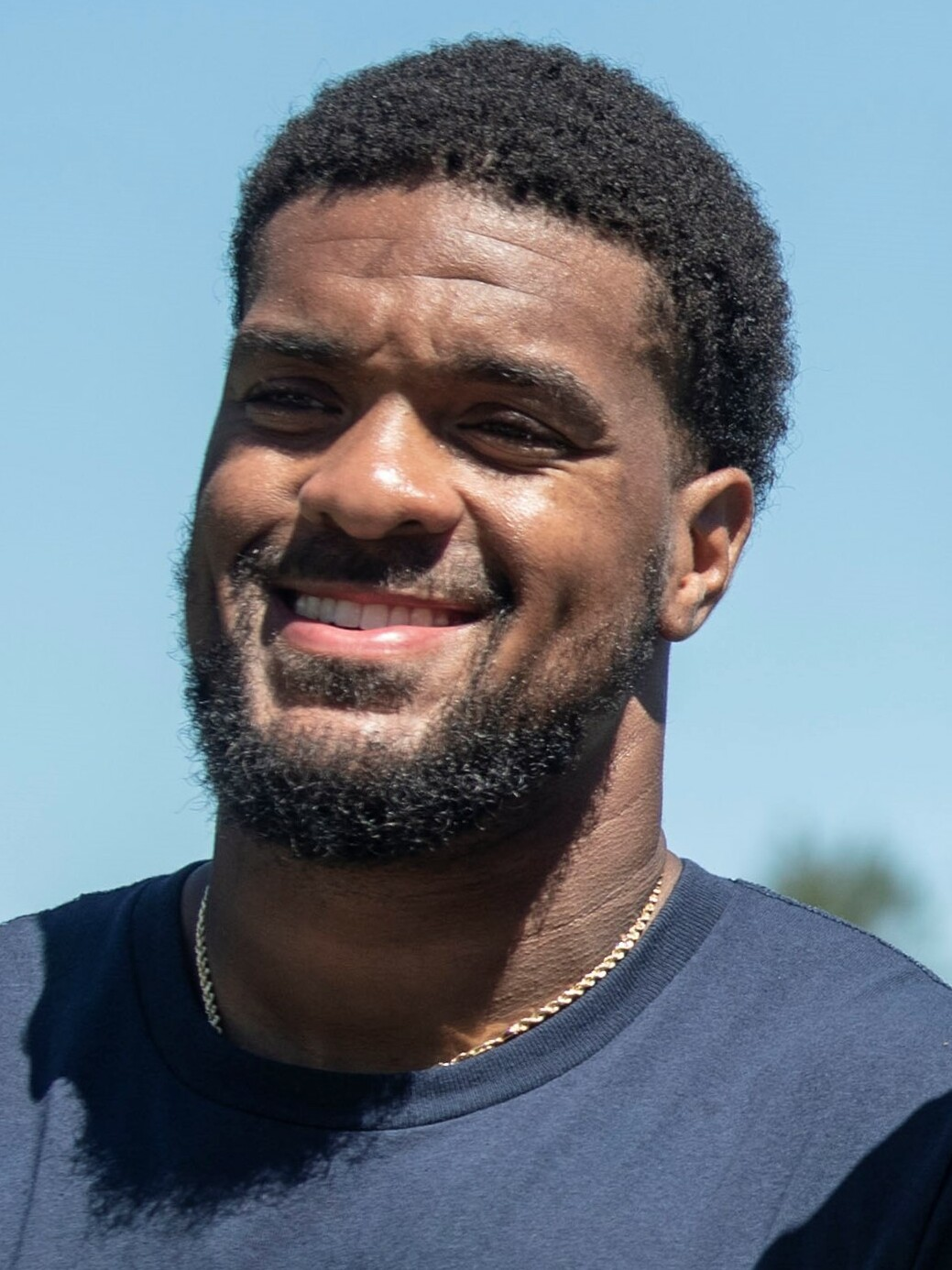
- Jones in 2023

No. 5 – New England Patriots
- Position: Outside linebacker
- Roster status: Active

Personal information
- Born: January 5, 1997 (age 29); Cleveland, Ohio, U.S.
- Listed height: 6 ft 3 in (1.91 m)
- Listed weight: 268 lb (122 kg)

Career information
- High school: Saint Ignatius (Cleveland)
- College: Ohio State (2015–2018)
- NFL draft: 2019: 3rd round, 71st overall pick

Career history
- Denver Broncos (2019–2022); Seattle Seahawks (2023–2024); Tennessee Titans (2025); Baltimore Ravens (2025); New England Patriots (2026–present)

Awards and highlights
- Freshman All-American (2016); First-team All-Big Ten (2018); Third-team All-Big Ten (2017)

Career NFL statistics as of Week 10, 2026
- Tackles: 272
- Sacks: 39.0
- Forced fumbles: 3
- Fumble recoveries: 3
- Pass deflections: 8
- Interceptions: 1
- Stats at Pro Football Reference

Dre'Mont Jones (born January 5, 1997) is an American professional football outside linebacker for the New England Patriots of the National Football League (NFL). He played college football for the Ohio State Buckeyes.

== Early life ==
Jones was named first-team Division-I All-Ohio and U.S. Army All-American as a senior, and graduated from Saint Ignatius High School (Cleveland) in 2015. He was a four star recruit, ranked #7 in the state of Ohio and #170 in the nation. On June 18, 2014, he committed to Ohio State University to continue his football career.

== College career ==
For his first year of eligibility in 2015, Jones redshirted as a true freshman. During his redshirt freshman season in 2016, Jones joined Dan Wilkinson and Luke Fickell as the only freshmen defensive linemen to start 10 or more games in a season. By the end of the season, Jones racked up 52 total tackles, including 4 tackles for a loss. He earned Freshman All-American honors from the Football Writers Association of America.

Jones slightly regressed during his sophomore season in 2017, but still, put up strong numbers. He finished the season with 20 total tackles, including 5 tackles for a loss and one sack. He was selected to the third-team All-Big Ten Conference. After his sophomore season, there was speculation that Jones would declare for the 2018 NFL draft, with draft analyst Mel Kiper Jr. listing him as the 8th best draft-eligible defensive tackle. Despite this speculation, Jones decided to return to school for his junior season.

Projected first round pick Nick Bosa went down with an injury against TCU on September 15, leading Jones to take on a larger role on the defensive line. Jones started all 14 games as a redshirt junior for Ohio State, and was selected to the first-team All-Big Ten Conference after breaking out with 8.5 sacks and 43 tackles. Jones became the first defensive lineman in OSU history to score two defensive touchdowns in a single season in 2018. After the season, Jones decided to forgo his senior year and enter the 2019 NFL draft.

=== College statistics ===
Season	Team	GP	Tackles					Interceptions				Fumbles	
Season	Team	GP	Solo	Ast	Cmb	TfL	Sck	Int	Yds	TD	PD	FR	FF
2015	Ohio State	0	Redshirted										
2016	Ohio State	12	22	30	52	4	0.0	0	0	0	0	0	0
2017	Ohio State	11	10	10	20	5	1.0	0	0	0	2	0	0
2018	Ohio State	14	26	17	43	13	8.5	1	28	1	2	2	1
Career		37	58	57	115	22	9.5	1	28	1	4	2	1

== Professional career ==
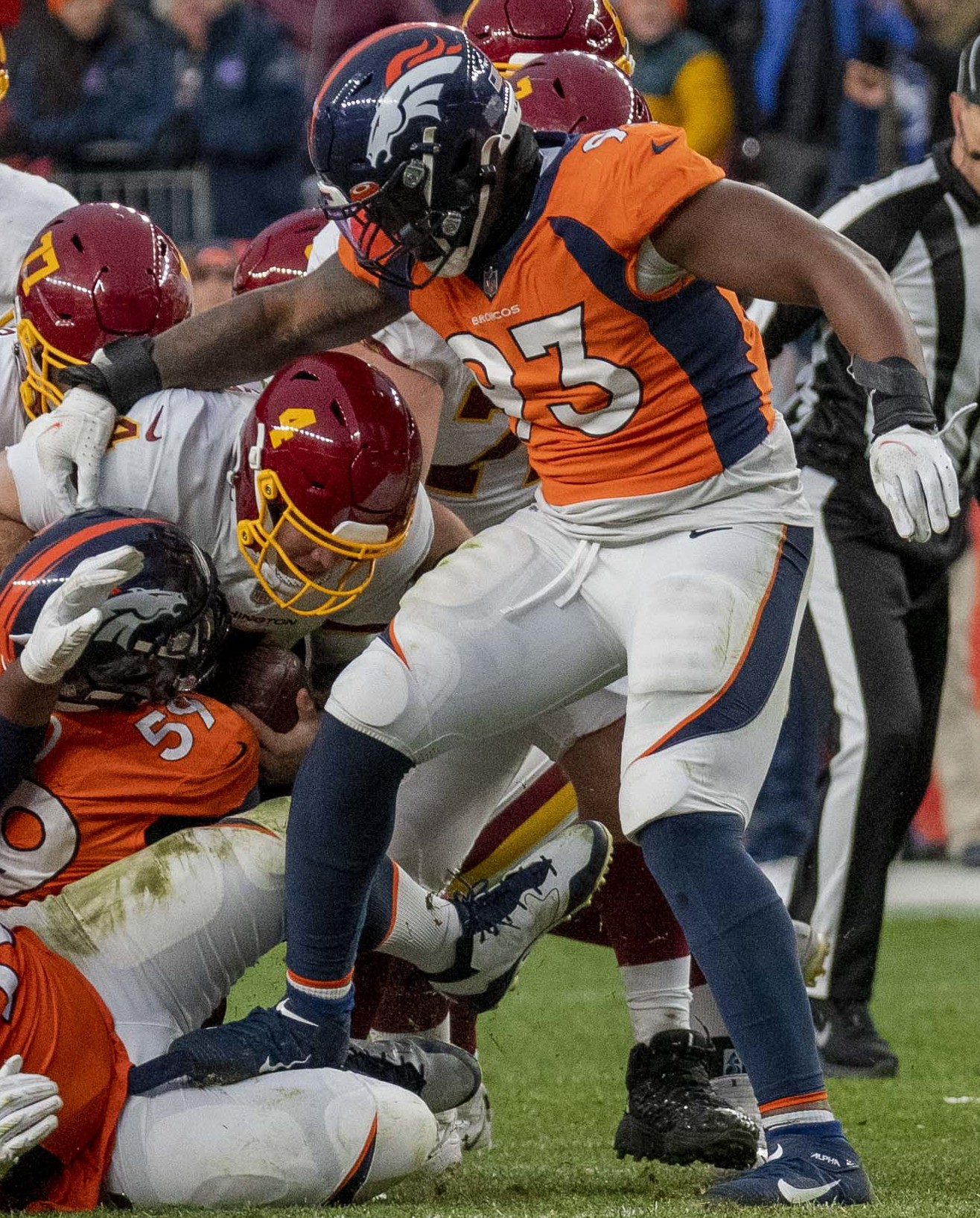
Jones with the Denver Broncos in 2021

Pre-draft measurables
Height	Weight	Arm length	Hand span	Wingspan	40-yard dash	10-yard split	20-yard split	20-yard shuttle	Three-cone drill	Vertical jump	Broad jump	Bench press	Wonderlic
6 ft 2 3/4 in (1.90 m)	281 lb (127 kg)	33 3/4 in (0.86 m)	9 5/8 in (0.24 m)	6 ft 8 5/8 in (2.05 m)	5.12 s	1.77 s	2.94 s	4.53 s	7.71 s	31.5 in (0.80 m)	9 ft 2 in (2.79 m)	18 reps	20
All values from NFL Combine/Pro Day

=== Denver Broncos ===
Jones was selected by the Denver Broncos in the third round (71st overall) of the 2019 NFL Draft. In week 11 against the Minnesota Vikings, Jones recorded his first career sack on Kirk Cousins in the 27–23 loss. In week 13 against the Los Angeles Chargers, Jones recorded an interception off Philip Rivers and returned it for 7 yards in the 23–20 win. This was Jones' first interception in the NFL. In week 16 against the Detroit Lions, Jones sacked fellow rookie David Blough 2.5 times during the 27–17 win. As a result of his performance, Jones won the American Football Conference (AFC) Defensive Player of the Week, the third Broncos player ever to win the award as a rookie.

On September 22, 2020, Jones was placed on injured reserve with a knee injury. He was activated on October 24. In Week 7 against the Kansas City Chiefs, Jones recorded his first sack of the season on Patrick Mahomes during the 43–16 loss.

In Week 8 of the 2022 season, Jones had seven tackles, three for a loss, and a sack in a 21–17 win over the Jacksonville Jaguars, earning AFC Defensive Player of the Week. On December 17, 2022, Jones was placed on season–ending injured reserve after suffering a hip injury in Week 14 against the Chiefs.

=== Seattle Seahawks ===
On March 13, 2023, the Seattle Seahawks signed Jones to a three-year, $51.53 million contract.

On March 4, 2025, Jones was released by the Seahawks.

=== Tennessee Titans ===
On March 14, 2025, Jones signed with the Tennessee Titans on a one-year, $10 million contract. He started all nine of his appearances for Tennessee, recording one fumble recovery, 4.5 sacks, and 26 combined tackles.

=== Baltimore Ravens ===
On November 3, 2025, the Baltimore Ravens acquired Jones from the Tennessee Titans in exchange for a conditional fifth-round pick. He finished the season with an additional fumble recovery, 2.5 sacks, and 17 combined tackles.

=== New England Patriots ===
On March 12, 2026, the New England Patriots signed Jones to a three-year, $39.5 million contract.

Jones switched his number to 5 after joining the Patriots, saying, "My birthday is Jan. 5, I saw 5 was open, and 5 is one of my favorite numbers." Jones previously wore #41 in Baltimore, #45 in Tennessee, #55 in Seattle, and #93 in Denver.

== NFL career statistics ==
Legend
	Led the league
**Bold**	Career high

=== Regular season ===
Year	Team	Games		Tackles						Interceptions						Fumbles				
Year	Team	GP	GS	Cmb	Solo	Ast	Sck	TFL	Sfty	Int	Yds	Avg	Lng	TD	PD	FF	Fum	FR	Yds	TD
2019	DEN	14	1	14	8	6	3.5	3	0	**1**	**7**	**7.0**	**7**	0	**2**	0	0	0	0	0
2020	DEN	13	8	41	**26**	15	6.5	7	0	0	0	0.0	0	0	**2**	0	0	0	0	0
2021	DEN	16	7	31	18	13	5.5	**9**	0	0	0	0.0	0	0	**2**	**1**	0	1	0	0
2022	DEN	13	13	47	24	23	6.5	**9**	0	0	0	0.0	0	0	0	**1**	0	0	0	0
2023	SEA	17	16	**49**	**26**	23	4.5	5	0	0	0	0.0	0	0	0	0	0	0	0	0
2024	SEA	17	7	28	14	14	4.0	7	**1**	0	0	0.0	0	0	1	**1**	0	0	0	0
2025	TEN	**9**	**9**	26	13	**13**	**4.5**	5	0	0	0	0.0	0	0	0	0	0	**1**	**2**	0
2025	BAL	**9**	**8**	17	6	**11**	**2.5**	2	0	0	0	0.0	0	0	1	0	0	**1**	0	0
2026	NE	9	9	19	8	11	1.5	2	0	0	0	0.0	0	0	0	0	0	0	0	0
Career		117	78	272	143	129	39.0	49	1	1	7	7.0	7	0	8	3	0	3	2	0
