= 2019 Rose Bowl =

College football bowl game

2019 Rose Bowl presented by Northwestern Mutual
- CFP New Year's Six; 105th Rose Bowl Game
Washington Huskies	Ohio State Buckeyes
(10–3)	(12–1)
Pac-12	Big Ten
23	28
Head coach: Chris Petersen	Head coach: Urban Meyer
AP / Coaches / CFP; 9 / 9 / 9	AP / Coaches / CFP; 5 / 5 / 6
	1	2	3	4	Total
Washington	3	0	0	20	23
Ohio State	7	14	7	0	28
- Date: January 1, 2019
- Season: 2018
- Stadium: Rose Bowl
- Location: Pasadena, California
- Players of the Game: Dwayne Haskins (QB, Ohio State) and Brendon White (S, Ohio State)
- Favorite: Ohio State by 6.5
- National anthem: Ohio State University Marching Band
- Referee: John McDaid (SEC)
- Halftime show: Ohio State University Marching Band; University of Washington Husky Marching Band
- Attendance: 91,853
- Payout: US$40 million to each team

United States TV coverage
- Network: ESPN and ESPN Radio
- Announcers: ESPN: Chris Fowler (play-by-play); Kirk Herbstreit (analyst); Maria Taylor and Tom Rinaldi (sideline); ESPN Radio: Dave Pasch, Greg McElroy, Tom Luginbill
- Nielsen ratings: 9.7 (16.78 million viewers)

International TV coverage
- Network: ESPN Deportes
- Announcers: Lalo Varela and Pablo Viruega

The 2019 Rose Bowl was a college football bowl game played on January 1, 2019, at the Rose Bowl Stadium in Pasadena, California. It was the 105th edition of the Rose Bowl Game, and one of the 2018–19 bowl games concluding the 2018 FBS football season. The game matched the Big Ten champion Ohio State Buckeyes against the Pac-12 champion Washington Huskies. Despite Washington leading in every major offensive statistical category (including over ten more minutes of time of possession along with producing 22 more offensive plays during the contest), Ohio State won the game, 28–23, to capture its eighth Rose Bowl championship in program history. Ohio State head coach Urban Meyer announced his retirement from coaching the month before, making the 2019 Rose Bowl his final game. Sponsored by the Northwestern Mutual financial services organization, the game was officially known as the Rose Bowl Game presented by Northwestern Mutual.

== Pre-game activities ==
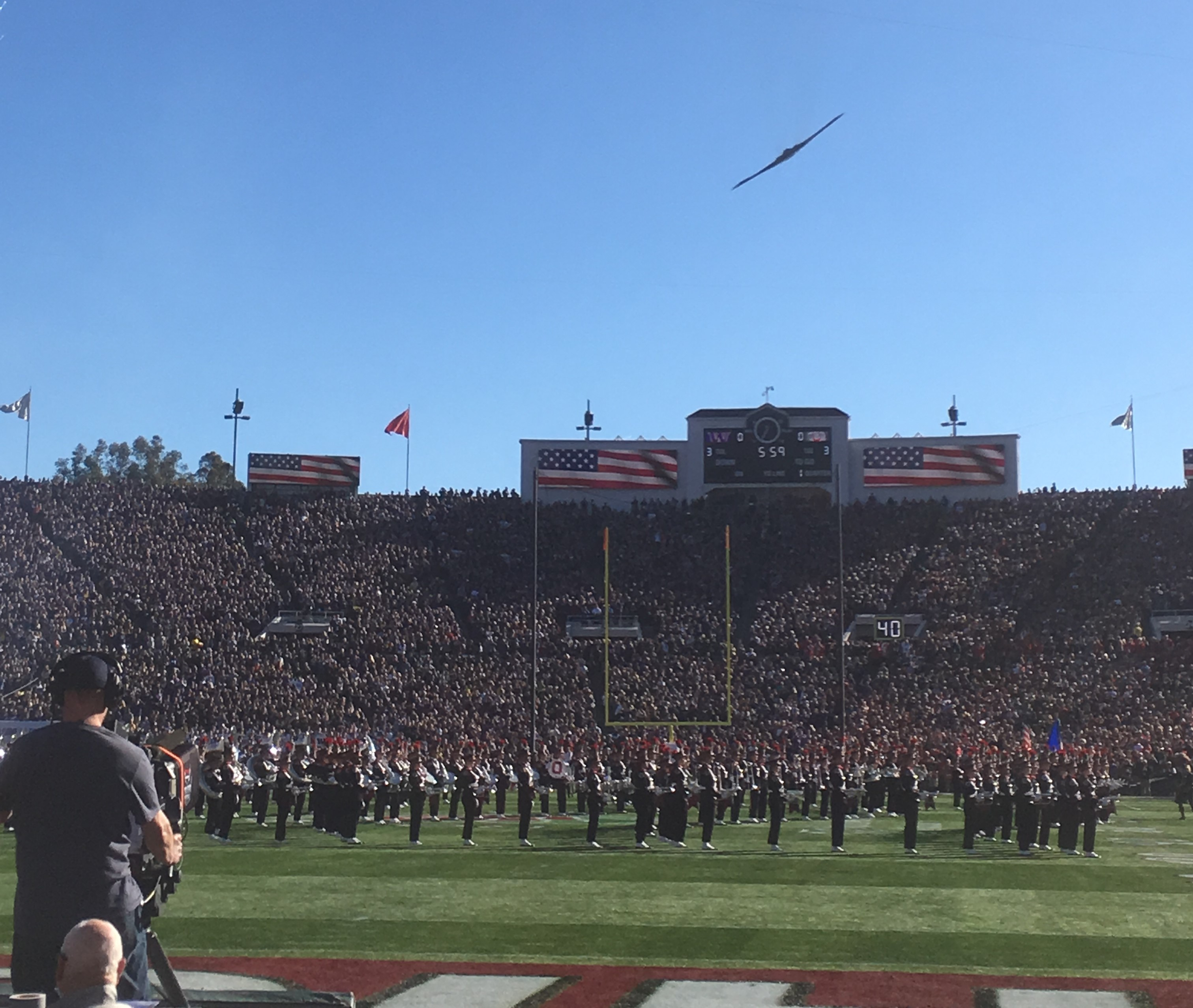
B-2 Spirit flyover before the game

"The Melody of Life" was the theme chosen by Pasadena Tournament of Roses president Gerald Freeny. The game was presided over by Grand Marshal Chaka Khan, the "Queen of Funk.".

George Halas (Great Lakes Navy), Randall McDaniel (Arizona State), Pop Warner (Stanford), and Vince Young (Texas) were inducted into the Rose Bowl Hall of Fame prior to the game.

The 130th Rose Parade was held in downtown Pasadena the morning of the game, with floats from both conferences. The bands and cheerleaders from both schools also participated.

== Teams ==
The teams playing in the Rose Bowl Game were the highest ranking teams from the Pac-12 Conference and Big Ten Conference that were not selected to play in a College Football Playoff (CFP) semifinal game; Washington and Ohio State, respectively. This game marks the first time those two programs met in a bowl game. This was the schools' 12th meeting; Ohio State led the all-time series, 8–3. Both teams arrived in Los Angeles by December 26 and participated in the Disneyland welcome at Disney California Adventure. Their practices were held at the Dignity Health Sports Park (formerly the StubHub Center) in nearby Carson.

=== Washington Huskies ===
Washington secured its berth in the Rose Bowl with a victory over Utah in the Pac-12 Football Championship Game on November 30. The Huskies entered the Rose Bowl with a 10–3 record (7–2 in conference). This was Washington's 15th appearance in the Rose Bowl Game, with a record of 7–6–1 entering the game.

=== Ohio State Buckeyes ===
Ohio State, winner of the Big Ten Football Championship Game, became the Big Ten representative in the Rose Bowl when the team was not selected for the College Football Playoff. The Buckeyes entered the Rose Bowl with a 12–1 record (8–1 in conference). This was Ohio State's last game under head coach Urban Meyer, who announced his intent to retire on December 4. This was Ohio State's 15th appearance in the Rose Bowl Game, with a record of 7–7 entering the game.

== Game summary ==
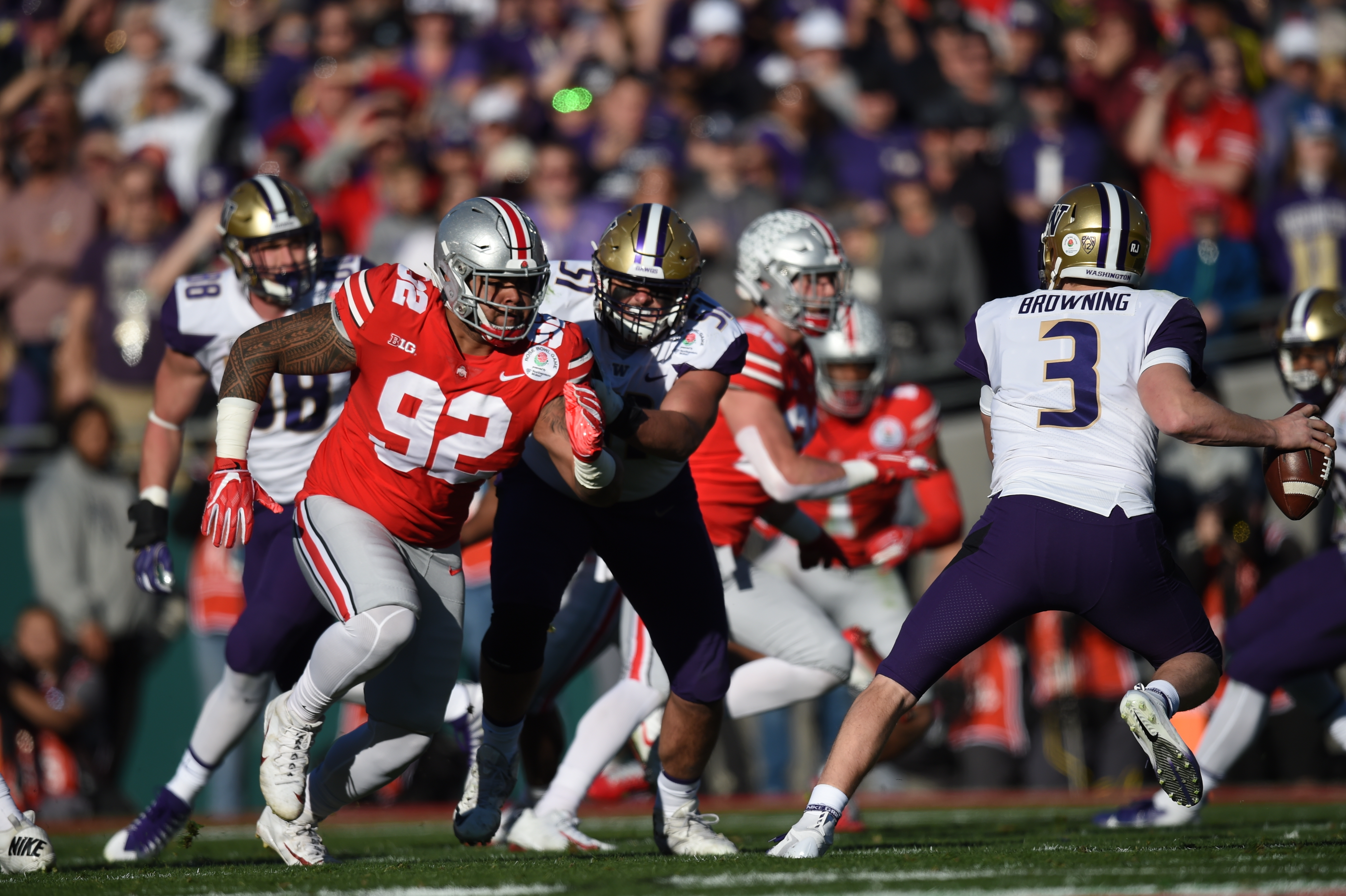
Jake Browning (right) scrambles to escape Ohio State's defensive pressure during the first half of the game

Game Time	Weather
Kickoff: 2:12 p.m. PST; End of game: 5:41 p.m. PST; Duration: 3 hours, 29 minutes	Temperature: 60 °F (16 °C); Wind: N 6 mph Weather: Sunny
Game officials
John McDaid (referee), Tom Quick (umpire), Chad Green (linesman); Michael Shirley (line judge), Jimmy Russell (back judge), Phil Davenport (field judge); Alex Moore (side judge), Brian Davis (center judge)

Scoring summary

Quarter	Time	Drive			Team	Scoring information	Score	
Quarter	Time	Plays	Yards	TOP	Team	Scoring information	WASH	OSU
1	9:04	11	77	2:45	OSU	Parris Campbell 12-yard touchdown reception from Dwayne Haskins, Blake Haubeil kick good	0	7
1	1:19	11	55	4:57	WASH	38-yard field goal by Peyton Henry	3	7
2	12:23	10	75	3:56	OSU	Johnnie Dixon 19-yard touchdown reception from Dwayne Haskins, Blake Haubeil kick good	3	14
2	0:14	5	57	0:46	OSU	Rashod Berry 1-yard touchdown reception from Dwayne Haskins, Blake Haubeil kick good	3	21
3	8:23	7	80	2:02	OSU	J. K. Dobbins 3-yard touchdown run, Blake Haubeil kick good	3	28
4	12:17	10	66	4:38	WASH	Drew Sample 2-yard touchdown reception from Myles Gaskin, Peyton Henry kick good	10	28
4	6:42	5	66	1:30	WASH	Myles Gaskin 1-yard touchdown run, Peyton Henry kick good	17	28
4	0:42	10	71	2:08	WASH	Myles Gaskin 2-yard touchdown run, 2-point pass failed	23	28
"TOP" = time of possession. For other American football terms, see Glossary of American football.							23	28

=== Statistics ===
	1	2	3	4	Total
No. 9 Huskies	3	0	0	20	23
No. 6 Buckeyes	7	14	7	0	28

Statistics	WASH	OSU
First downs	27	22
Plays–yards	91–444	69–364
Rushes–yards	36–129	32–113
Passing yards	315	251
Passing: comp–att–int	36–55–0	25–37–0
Turnovers		
Time of possession	35:02	24:58

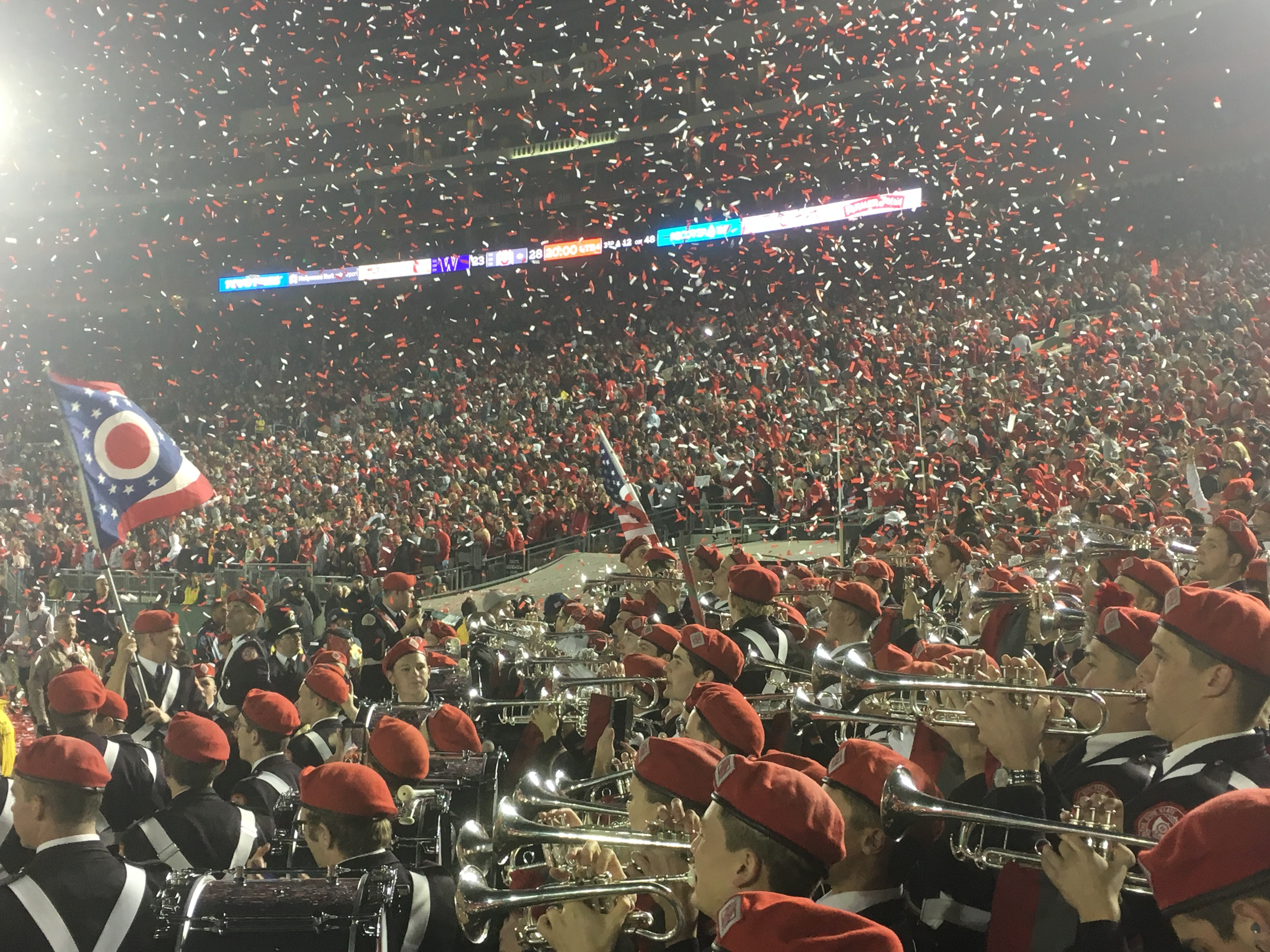
Ohio State Marching Band and stadium immediately after the game

Team	Category	Player	Statistics
Washington	Passing	Jake Browning	35/54, 313 yds
Washington	Rushing	Myles Gaskin	24 car, 121 yds, 2 TD
Washington	Receiving	Andre Baccellia	12 rec, 109 yds
Ohio State	Passing	Dwayne Haskins	25/37, 251 yds, 3 TD
Ohio State	Rushing	Mike Weber	15 car, 96 yds
Ohio State	Receiving	Parris Campbell	11 rec, 71 yds, 1 TD
