= Michael Jordan (offensive lineman) =

American football player (born 1998)

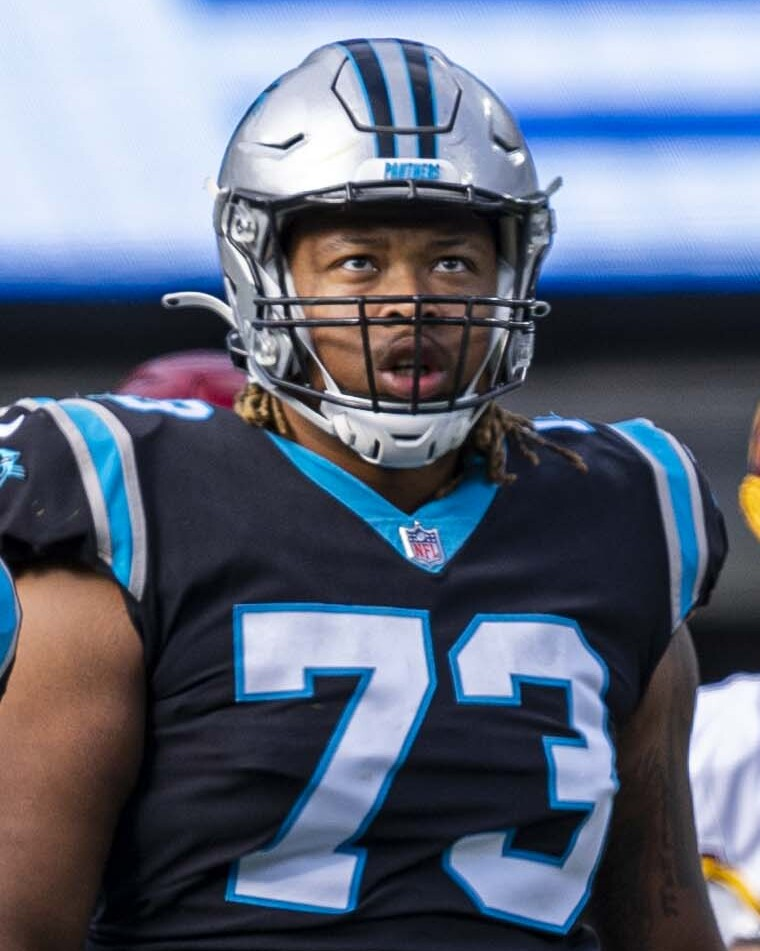
- Jordan with the Carolina Panthers in 2021

Baltimore Ravens
- Position: Guard
- Roster status: Practice squad

Personal information
- Born: January 25, 1998 (age 28); Cincinnati, Ohio, U.S.
- Listed height: 6 ft 6 in (1.98 m)
- Listed weight: 315 lb (143 kg)

Career information
- High school: Plymouth (Canton, Michigan)
- College: Ohio State (2016–2018)
- NFL draft: 2019: 4th round, 136th overall pick

Career history
- Cincinnati Bengals (2019–2020); Carolina Panthers (2021–2022); Green Bay Packers (2023)*; New England Patriots (2024); Green Bay Packers (2024)*; Tampa Bay Buccaneers (2025); Philadelphia Eagles (2026)*; Baltimore Ravens (2026–present)*
- * Offseason or practice squad member only

Awards and highlights
- Second-team All-American (2018); First-team All-Big Ten (2017); Second-team All-Big Ten (2018)

Career NFL statistics as of Week 15, 2025
- Games played: 75
- Games started: 46
- Touchdowns: 1
- Stats at Pro Football Reference

Michael Jordan (born January 25, 1998) is an American professional football guard for the Baltimore Ravens of the National Football League (NFL). He played college football for the Ohio State Buckeyes and was selected by the Cincinnati Bengals in the fourth round of the 2019 NFL draft.

== College career ==
He played college football for the Ohio State Buckeyes.

== Professional career ==
Pre-draft measurables
Height	Weight	Arm length	Hand span	Wingspan	40-yard dash	10-yard split	20-yard split	20-yard shuttle	Three-cone drill	Vertical jump	Broad jump	Bench press
6 ft 5 7/8 in (1.98 m)	312 lb (142 kg)	34 1/4 in (0.87 m)	10 in (0.25 m)	6 ft 11 in (2.11 m)	5.27 s	1.86 s	3.07 s	4.71 s	7.71 s	32.5 in (0.83 m)	9 ft 8 in (2.95 m)	19 reps
All values from NFL Combine

=== Cincinnati Bengals ===
Jordan was selected by the Cincinnati Bengals in the fourth round, 136th overall, of the 2019 NFL draft. He started nine games at left guard as a rookie in the 2019 season. He started ten games in 2020.

On August 31, 2021, Jordan was waived by the Bengals.

=== Carolina Panthers ===
On September 1, 2021, Jordan was claimed off waivers by the Carolina Panthers. On October 4, 2021, Jordan was waived by the Panthers and re-signed to the practice squad. He was promoted to the active roster on October 16, 2021.

In the final game of the 2022 season, Jordan recovered a fumble by Sam Darnold in the end zone for a game-tying touchdown against the New Orleans Saints. The Panthers would go on to win the game, 10–7.

On May 11, 2023, Jordan re-signed with the Panthers. He was released on August 29, 2023.

=== Green Bay Packers (first stint) ===
On September 12, 2023, Jordan was signed to the Green Bay Packers's practice squad. On January 20, 2024, Jordan was released from the practice squad.

=== New England Patriots ===
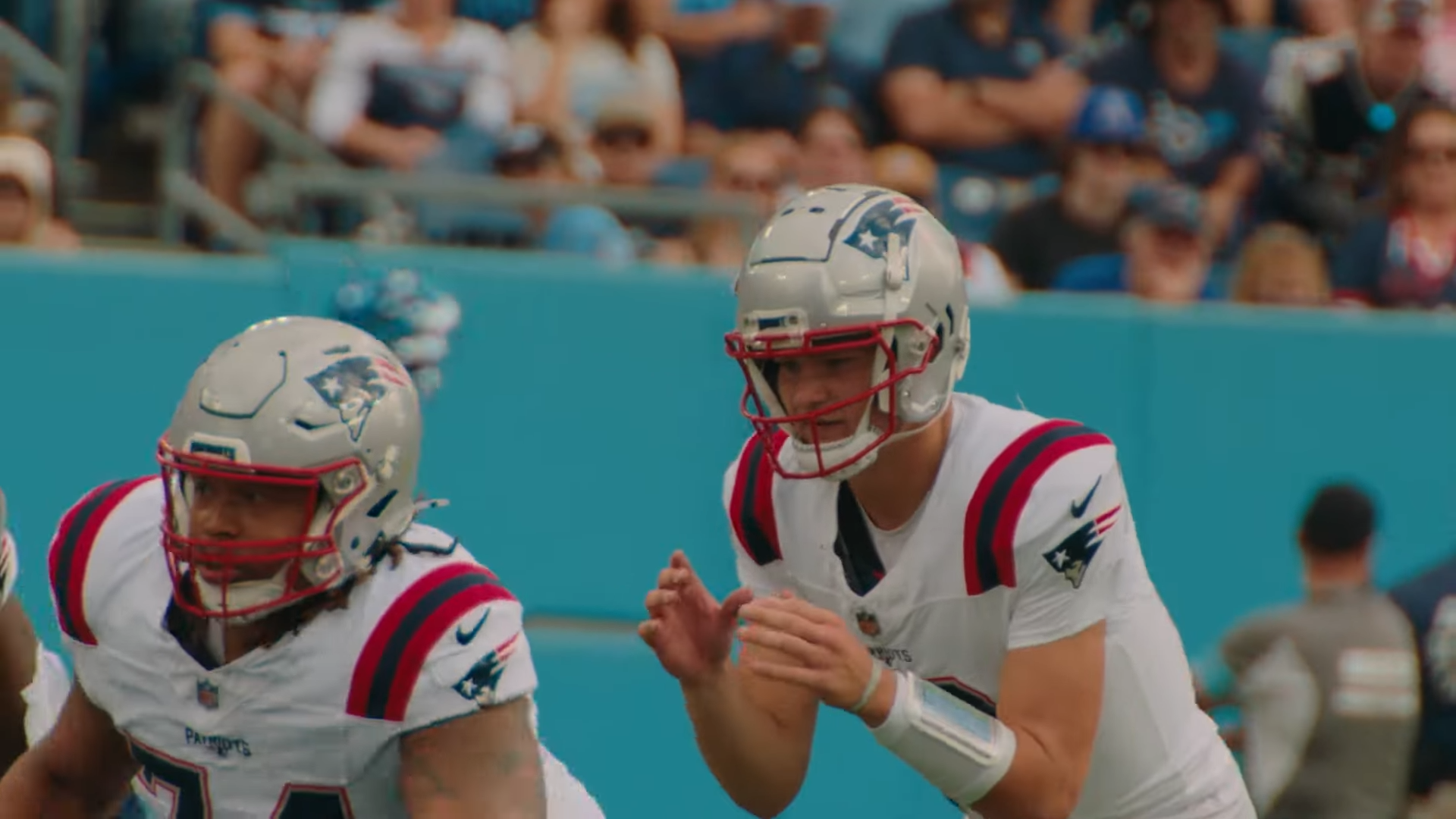
Jordan (left) playing for the New England Patriots in 2024.

Jordan signed with the New England Patriots on January 24, 2024. He was released on August 28, 2024, and re-signed to the practice squad. On September 16, he was promoted to the active roster. He started 11 games at left guard before being released on November 26, and re-signed to the practice squad on November 29. Jordan was released by the Patriots on December 3.

=== Green Bay Packers (second stint) ===
On December 9, 2024, Jordan signed with the Green Bay Packers' practice squad.

=== Tampa Bay Buccaneers ===
On July 24, 2025, Jordan signed with the Tampa Bay Buccaneers. He was released on August 26 as part of final roster cuts and re-signed to the practice squad the next day. After being elevated and starting three games, Jordan was signed to the active roster on October 22.

=== Philadelphia Eagles ===
On June 10, 2026, Jordan signed with the Philadelphia Eagles. On August 30, he was released by Philadelphia as a part of final roster cuts.

=== Baltimore Ravens ===
On October 27, 2026, Jordan signed with the Baltimore Ravens practice squad. On November 10, he was released. On November 18, he was re-signed to the practice squad.
