= Dallas Gant =

American football linebacker (born 2000)

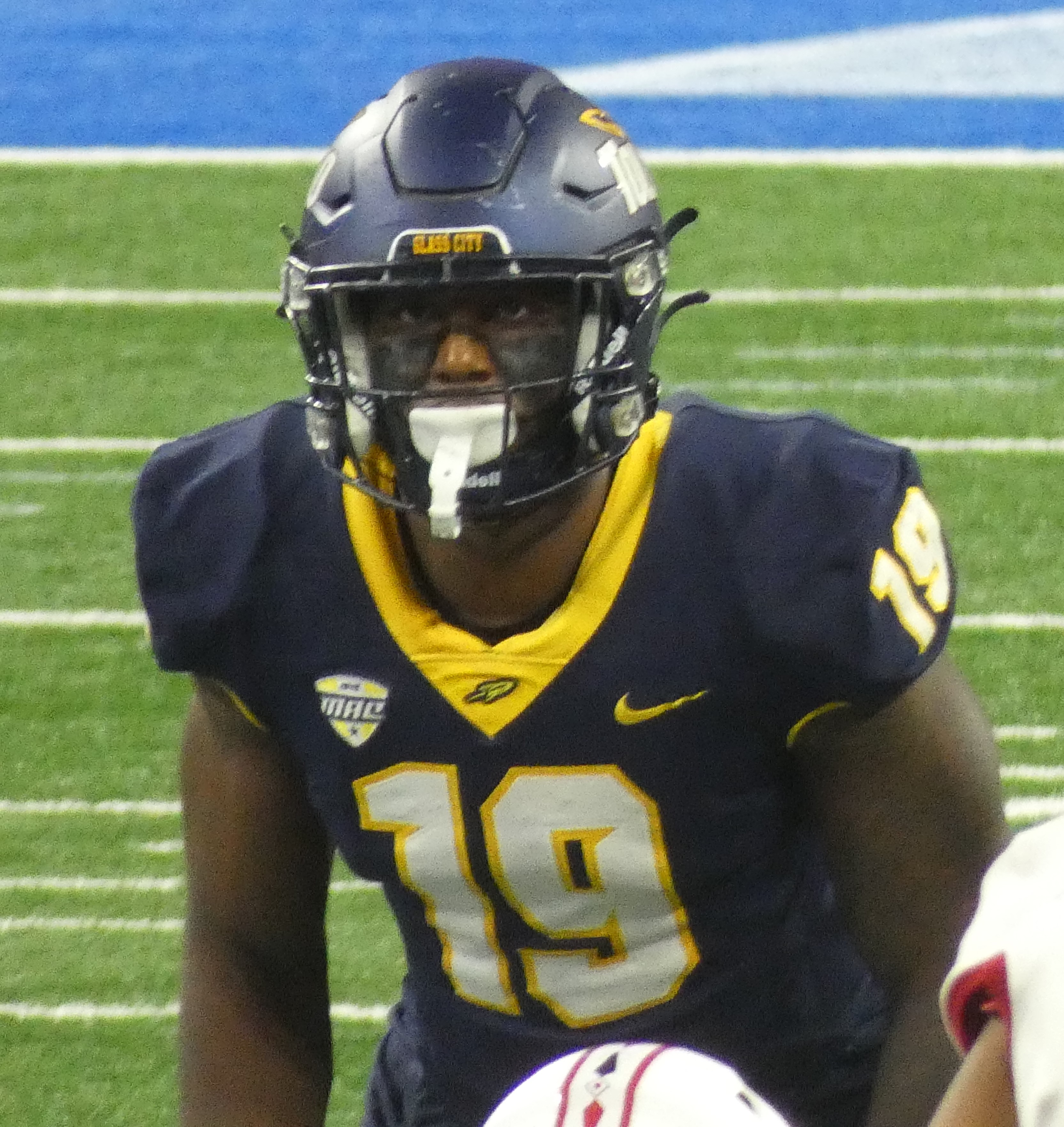
- Gant with the Toledo Rockets in 2023

Profile
- Position: Linebacker

Personal information
- Born: May 16, 2000 (age 26); Toledo, Ohio, U.S.
- Listed height: 6 ft 2 in (1.88 m)
- Listed weight: 224 lb (102 kg)

Career information
- High school: St. John's Jesuit (Toledo, Ohio)
- College: Ohio State (2018–2021); Toledo (2022–2023)
- NFL draft: 2024: undrafted

Career history
- Minnesota Vikings (2024)*; Philadelphia Eagles (2024)
- * Offseason or practice squad member only

Awards and highlights
- Super Bowl champion (LIX); 2× First-team All-MAC (2022, 2023)

Career NFL statistics as of Week 18, 2024
- Total tackles: 1
- Stats at Pro Football Reference

Dallas Gant (born May 16, 2000) is an American professional football linebacker. He played college football for the Ohio State Buckeyes and Toledo Rockets. He was signed by the Vikings as an undrafted free agent after the 2024 NFL draft.

== Early life ==
Gant attended St. John's Jesuit High School in Toledo, Ohio. As a senior, he hauled in 27 passes for 456 yards and a touchdown on offense, along with 96 tackles, seven tackles fr loss, and one interception on defense. Gant committed to play college football at the Ohio State University over other schools such as Michigan State, Notre Dame, and Penn State.

== College career ==
=== Ohio State ===
As a freshman in 2018, Gant recorded six tackles in three games. In week two of the 2019 season, he forced a fumble in a 42–0 win over Cincinnati. Gant finished the 2019 season with 21 tackles with three being for a loss, 1.5 sacks, and a forced fumble. In week one of the 2020 season, he forced a fumble on quarterback Luke McCaffrey, as he helped Ohio State beat Nebraska. Gant finished the 2020 season with 17 tackles with 0.5 tackle going for a loss, a pass deflection, a forced fumble, and a fumble recovery. However, Gant entered the transfer portal just over three weeks into the 2021 season.

=== Toledo ===
Gant decided to transfer to Toledo to continue his college career. In his Toledo debut, he notched 11 tackles, 0.5 tackle for loss, a pass deflection, and a forced fumble, as he helped the Rockets beat LIU 37–0. Gant finished his breakout 2022 season with 116 tackles with 5.5 being for a loss, five pass deflections, and two forced fumbles. For his performance, he was named first-team all-MAC. Gant was named to multiple award watch lists ahead of the 2023 season, such as the Wuerffel Trophy watch list, the Butkus Award watch list, and the Lombardi Award watch list.

== Professional career ==
Pre-draft measurables
Height	Weight	Arm length	Hand span	40-yard dash	10-yard split	20-yard split	20-yard shuttle	Three-cone drill	Vertical jump	Broad jump	Bench press
6 ft 2 1/2 in (1.89 m)	228 lb (103 kg)	33 3/8 in (0.85 m)	10 1/8 in (0.26 m)	4.69 s	1.63 s	2.69 s	4.50 s	7.43 s	35.0 in (0.89 m)	10 ft 6 in (3.20 m)	17 reps
All values from Pro Day

=== Minnesota Vikings ===
Gant was signed by the Minnesota Vikings as an undrafted free agent after the 2024 NFL draft. He was also selected by the DC Defenders in the seventh round of the 2024 UFL draft on July 17. He was waived on August 27, and re-signed to the practice squad. He was released on October 29.

=== Philadelphia Eagles ===
On November 4, 2024, Gant was signed to the Philadelphia Eagles practice squad. On December 28, he was elevated to the team's active roster for their Week 17 matchup against the Dallas Cowboys. He won a Super Bowl championship when the Eagles defeated the Kansas City Chiefs 40–22 in Super Bowl LIX. He signed a reserve/future contract on February 14, 2025.

On August 26, 2025, Gant was waived by the Eagles as part of final roster cuts.

=== Louisville Kings ===
On January 14, 2026, Gant was selected by the Louisville Kings of the United Football League (UFL).
