= Taron Vincent =

American football player (born 2000)

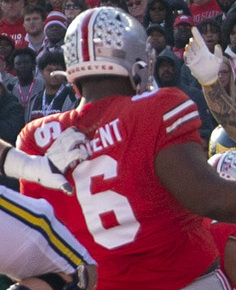
- Vincent with the Ohio State Buckeyes in 2022

Profile
- Position: Defensive tackle

Personal information
- Born: February 5, 2000 (age 26); Baltimore, Maryland, U.S.
- Listed height: 6 ft 1 in (1.85 m)
- Listed weight: 305 lb (138 kg)

Career information
- High school: IMG Academy (Bradenton, Florida)
- College: Ohio State (2018–2022)
- NFL draft: 2023: undrafted

Career history
- Los Angeles Rams (2023)*; Houston Roughnecks (2024)*; San Antonio Brahmas (2024)
- * Offseason or practice squad member only
- Stats at Pro Football Reference

Taron Vincent (born February 5, 2000) is an American professional football defensive tackle. He played college football at Ohio State.

== College career ==
Vincent was ranked as a five-star prospect in the 247Sports composite rankings out of high school. He committed to Ohio State on April 2, 2017, over offers from Alabama, Florida State, and Georgia. Prior to the 2023 NFL draft, Vincent played in the 2023 East-West Shrine Bowl.

== Professional career ==
Pre-draft measurables
Height	Weight	Arm length	Hand span	Wingspan	40-yard dash	10-yard split	20-yard split	20-yard shuttle	Three-cone drill	Vertical jump	Broad jump	Bench press
6 ft 1 3/8 in (1.86 m)	304 lb (138 kg)	32 1/4 in (0.82 m)	9 in (0.23 m)	6 ft 5 5/8 in (1.97 m)	5.15 s	1.84 s	3.01 s	4.80 s	8.00 s	26.5 in (0.67 m)	8 ft 0 in (2.44 m)	26 reps
All values from Pro Day

=== Los Angeles Rams ===
After he went undrafted in the 2023 NFL draft, Vincent was invited by the Buffalo Bills to their rookie camp. He later signed with the Los Angeles Rams. He was waived on August 29, 2023.

=== Houston Roughnecks ===
On December 12, 2023, Vincent signed with the Houston Roughnecks of the XFL. The Roughnecks brand was transferred to the Houston Gamblers when the XFL and United States Football League merged to create the United Football League (UFL).

=== San Antonio Brahmas ===
On January 5, 2024, Vincent was drafted by the San Antonio Brahmas during the 2024 UFL dispersal draft. He was placed on injured reserve on May 16. He re-signed with the team on August 26, 2024. He was released on March 10, 2025.

== Personal life ==
Vincent is the son of former NFL cornerback and current NFL employee Troy Vincent.
