= Isaiah Prince =

American football player (born 1997)

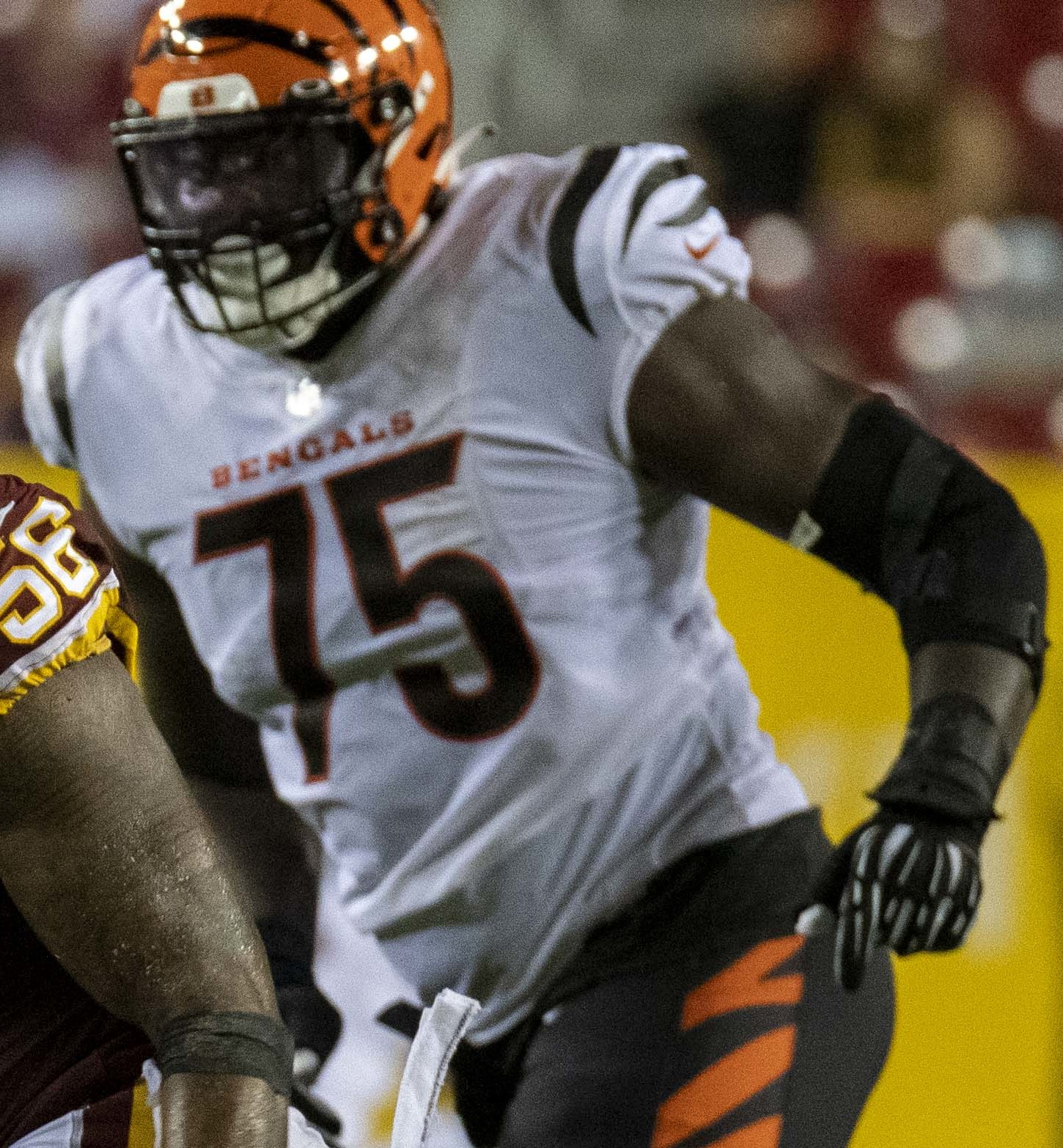
- Prince with the Cincinnati Bengals in 2021

Profile
- Position: Offensive tackle

Personal information
- Born: July 29, 1997 (age 29); Greenbelt, Maryland, U.S.
- Listed height: 6 ft 7 in (2.01 m)
- Listed weight: 305 lb (138 kg)

Career information
- High school: Eleanor Roosevelt (Greenbelt)
- College: Ohio State (2015–2018)
- NFL draft: 2019: 6th round, 202nd overall pick

Career history
- Miami Dolphins (2019); Cincinnati Bengals (2019–2022); Denver Broncos (2023)*; Atlanta Falcons (2023); Tennessee Titans (2024)*; San Francisco 49ers (2025)*
- * Offseason or practice squad member only

Awards and highlights
- First-team All-Big Ten (2018); Third-team All-Big-Ten (2017)

Career NFL statistics as of 2024
- Games played: 22
- Games started: 6
- Stats at Pro Football Reference

Isaiah Prince (born July 29, 1997) is an American professional football offensive tackle. He played college football for the Ohio State Buckeyes. He was selected by the Miami Dolphins in the sixth round of the 2019 NFL draft.

== College career ==
Coming to Ohio State, Prince was one of only four true freshmen to play for the Buckeyes in 2015 earning his first varsity letter. He became a starter at right tackle during his sophomore year, starting all 13 games. After his sophomore year, he was the only member of the 2015 Ohio State recruits to play every game over the past 2 seasons. Going into his junior year, Prince was temporarily moved to left tackle switching spots with lineman Thayer Munford. They switched back before the start of the season.

== Professional career ==
Pre-draft measurables
| Height | Weight | Arm length | Hand span | 40-yard dash | 10-yard split | 20-yard split | 20-yard shuttle | Three-cone drill | Vertical jump | Broad jump | Bench press |
|---|---|---|---|---|---|---|---|---|---|---|---|
| 6 ft 6 1/2 in (1.99 m) | 305 lb (138 kg) | 35 1/2 in (0.90 m) | 10 1/8 in (0.26 m) | 5.09 s | 1.83 s | 2.94 s | 5.02 s | 7.90 s | 27.0 in (0.69 m) | 9 ft 7 in (2.92 m) | 23 reps |
All values from NFL Combine

=== Miami Dolphins ===
Prince was selected by the Miami Dolphins in the sixth round, 202nd overall, of the 2019 NFL draft. He played in four games with two starts before being waived on December 5, 2019.

=== Cincinnati Bengals ===
On December 6, 2019, Prince was claimed off waivers by the Cincinnati Bengals. On July 31, 2020, Prince announced he would opt out of the 2020 season due to the COVID-19 pandemic.

Prince was named backup right tackle for the 2021 season, behind veteran Riley Reiff on the depth chart, playing in 15 regular season games with four starts. During Week 12 against the Pittsburgh Steelers, Prince took over for Reiff, who had gone down with an ankle injury, and would go on to start for all playoff games and Super Bowl LVI at right tackle.

On September 2, 2022, Prince was placed on injured reserve with an elbow injury. He was activated on November 21, then waived and re-signed to the practice squad.

=== Denver Broncos ===
On February 1, 2023, Prince signed a reserve/future contract with the Denver Broncos. On August 27, Prince was released.

=== Atlanta Falcons ===
On August 30, 2023, Prince signed with the Atlanta Falcons. On September 27, Prince was released by the Falcons.

=== Arlington Renegades ===
On July 29, 2024, Prince signed with the Arlington Renegades of the United Football League (UFL).

=== Tennessee Titans ===
On October 22, 2024, Prince signed with the Tennessee Titans practice squad. Following an injury to Leroy Watson on Week 11, Prince was elevated for his first game as a Titan against the Minnesota Vikings, playing half the snaps as a right tackle. He signed a reserve/future contract with Tennessee on January 6, 2025. On April 29, Prince was waived by the Titans.

=== San Francisco 49ers ===
On August 4, 2025, Prince signed with the San Francisco 49ers. He was placed on injured reserve on August 25, and later released.
