= Parris Campbell =

American football player (born 1997)

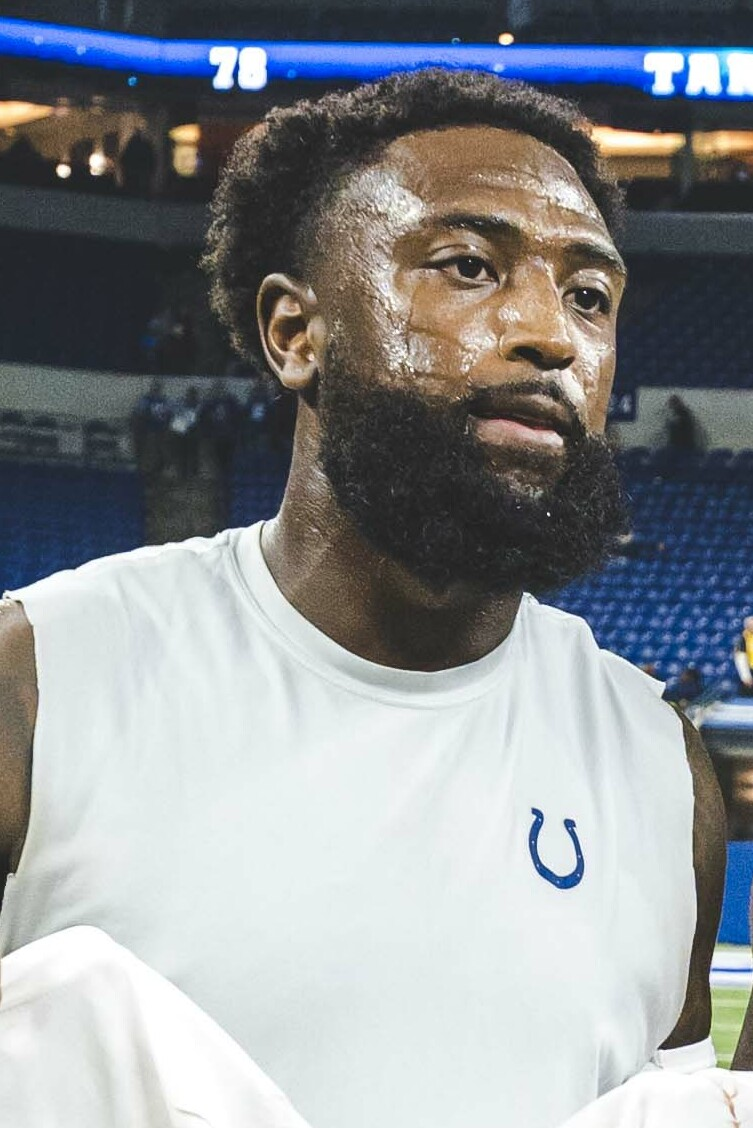
- Campbell with the Indianapolis Colts in 2022

No. 15, 1, 0, 80, 11
- Position: Wide receiver

Personal information
- Born: July 16, 1997 (age 29); Akron, Ohio, U.S.
- Listed height: 6 ft 0 in (1.83 m)
- Listed weight: 210 lb (95 kg)

Career information
- High school: St. Vincent–St. Mary (Akron)
- College: Ohio State (2014–2018)
- NFL draft: 2019: 2nd round, 59th overall pick

Career history
- Indianapolis Colts (2019–2022); New York Giants (2023); Philadelphia Eagles (2024); Dallas Cowboys (2025)

Awards and highlights
- Super Bowl champion (LIX); CFP national champion (2015); First-team All-Big Ten (2018); Second-team All-Big Ten (2017); Third-team All-Big Ten (2016)

Career NFL statistics
- Receptions: 123
- Receiving yards: 1,117
- Receiving touchdowns: 6
- Return yards: 366
- Stats at Pro Football Reference

Parris John Campbell Jr. (born July 16, 1997) is an American former professional football player who was a wide receiver for seven seasons in the National Football League (NFL). He played college football for the Ohio State Buckeyes and was selected by the Indianapolis Colts in the second round of the 2019 NFL draft. He also played for the New York Giants, Philadelphia Eagles, and Dallas Cowboys.

== Early life ==
Campbell attended St. Vincent–St. Mary High School in Akron, Ohio. He played wide receiver and running back in high school. As a senior, he ran for 1,584 yards and 22 touchdowns. Campbell also led St. Vincent-St. Mary to win back-to-back state championships (2012 and 2013) his junior and senior year. He committed to Ohio State University to play college football. Campbell also ran track in high school.

== College career ==
After redshirting his first year at Ohio State in 2014, Campbell played in four games as a freshman in 2015, but did not record any receptions. As a sophomore in 2016, he had 13 receptions for 121 yards and added 21 kick returns for 584 yards. As a junior in 2017, Campbell had 40 receptions for 584 yards and three touchdowns. He returned to Ohio State his senior season in 2018. In the 2018 season, Campbell had three games where he went over 100 yards receiving and scored two touchdowns, Tulane, Indiana, and Michigan. He totaled 90 receptions for 1,063 receiving yards and 12 receiving touchdowns in his last season in Columbus.

== Professional career ==
Pre-draft measurables
Height	Weight	Arm length	Hand span	Wingspan	40-yard dash	10-yard split	20-yard split	20-yard shuttle	Vertical jump	Broad jump	Bench press
5 ft 11 7/8 in (1.83 m)	205 lb (93 kg)	32 1/4 in (0.82 m)	9 1/2 in (0.24 m)	6 ft 3 5/8 in (1.92 m)	4.31 s	1.45 s	2.51 s	4.03 s	40.0 in (1.02 m)	11 ft 3 in (3.43 m)	11 reps
All values from NFL Combine

=== Indianapolis Colts ===
Campbell was drafted by the Indianapolis Colts in the second round (59th overall) of the 2019 NFL draft. He caught his first NFL touchdown in Week 2 against the Tennessee Titans on September 15, 2019. He was placed on injured reserve on December 9, 2019, after suffering a broken foot in Week 14. He finished the season with 18 catches for 127 yards and one touchdown through seven games and three starts. He dealt with several injuries throughout his rookie year, including a sports hernia costing him two games and a broken hand causing him to miss four more games.

In Week 1 of the 2020 season, Campbell caught six passes for a career-high 71 yards against the Jacksonville Jaguars. In Week 2, he suffered a PCL and MCL injury in his left knee and was placed on injured reserve on September 22, 2020.

On October 19, 2021, Campbell was placed on injured reserve. He was activated off of the list on January 8, 2022. He finished the 2021 season with ten receptions for 162 yards and a touchdown in six games and three starts.

In the 2022 season, Campbell appeared in all 17 games and started 16. He finished with 63 receptions for 623 receiving yards and three receiving touchdowns.

=== New York Giants ===
On March 17, 2023, Campbell signed a one-year contract with the New York Giants. He played in 12 games with three starts, recording 20 catches for 104 yards.

=== Philadelphia Eagles ===
On March 21, 2024, Campbell signed with the Philadelphia Eagles. He was released on August 27, and re-signed to the practice squad. He was promoted to the active roster on October 12. He won a Super Bowl championship when the Eagles defeated the Kansas City Chiefs 40–22 in Super Bowl LIX.

=== Dallas Cowboys ===
On March 15, 2025, Campbell signed a one-year contract with the Dallas Cowboys. Campbell was released from the Cowboys on August 5, after being placed on injured reserve three days prior. He was re-signed to the practice squad on September 30. Campbell signed a reserve/future contract with Dallas on January 5, 2026. During his tenure with the Cowboys, he was elevated from the practice squad once, playing in one game in 2025.

On May 27, 2026, Campbell announced his retirement from the NFL.

== Career statistics ==
College statistics
Year	Team	GP	Receiving				Rushing				Scrimmage			
Year	Team	GP	Rec	Yds	Avg	TD	Att	Yds	Avg	TD	Plays	Yds	Avg	TD
2014	Ohio State	0	(redshirt) Redshirted											
2015	Ohio State	4	0	0	0.0	0	0	0	0.0	0	0	0	0.0	0
2016	Ohio State	12	13	121	9.3	0	4	54	13.5	1	17	175	10.3	1
2017	Ohio State	13	40	584	14.6	3	10	132	13.2	1	50	716	14.3	4
2018	Ohio State	14	90	1,063	11.8	12	9	24	2.7	0	99	1,087	11.0	12
Career		43	143	1,768	12.4	15	23	210	9.1	2	166	1,978	11.9	17
