= Drue Chrisman =

American football player (born 1997)

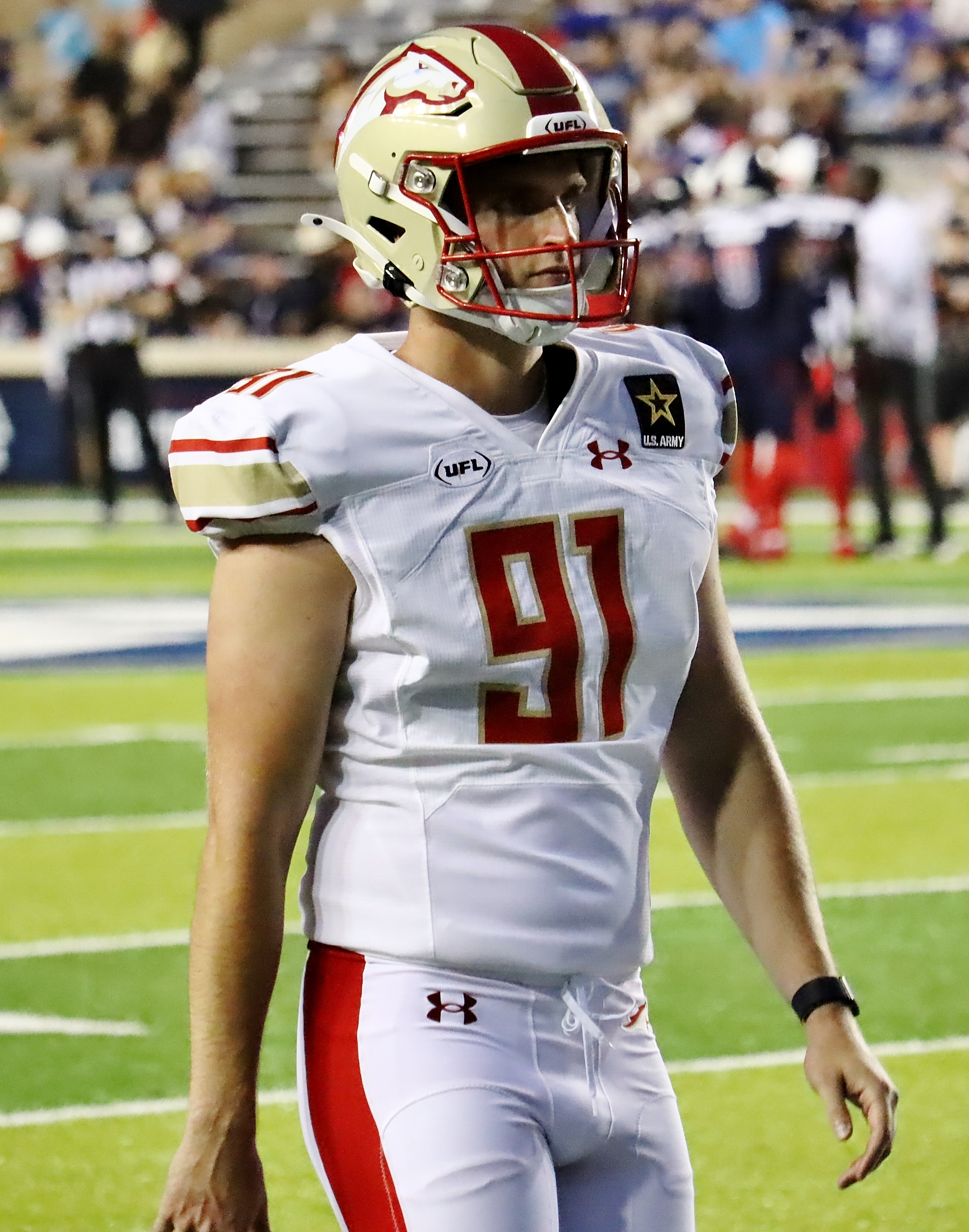
- Chrisman with the Birmingham Stallions in 2024

Profile
- Position: Punter

Personal information
- Born: July 7, 1997 (age 29); Lawrenceburg, Indiana, U.S.
- Listed height: 6 ft 3 in (1.91 m)
- Listed weight: 211 lb (96 kg)

Career information
- High school: La Salle (Cincinnati, Ohio)
- College: Ohio State (2017–2020)
- NFL draft: 2021: undrafted

Career history
- Cincinnati Bengals (2021)*; Pittsburgh Steelers (2021)*; Cincinnati Bengals (2021–2022); Birmingham Stallions (2024)
- * Offseason or practice squad member only

Awards and highlights
- Second-team All-Big Ten (2020); Third-team All-Big Ten (2018)

Career NFL statistics
- Punts: 28
- Punting yards: 1,338
- Punting average: 47.8
- Longest punt: 65
- Inside 20: 13
- Touchbacks: 2
- Stats at Pro Football Reference

Drue Chrisman (born July 7, 1997) is an American professional football punter. He played college football for the Ohio State Buckeyes and was signed as an undrafted free agent by the Cincinnati Bengals after the 2021 NFL draft.

== College career ==
Chrisman was ranked as a three–star recruit by 247Sports.com coming out of high school. He committed to Ohio State on May 5, 2015.

Chrisman helped the Buckeyes win four Big 10 Titles in a row (2017–2020), on their way to capturing the 2017 Cotton Bowl, the 2019 Rose Bowl, and the 2021 Sugar Bowl/CFP Semi-Final.

Chrisman capped off his college football career helping lead the Buckeyes to the 2021 CFP National Championship Game.

== Professional career ==
Pre-draft measurables
Height	Weight	Arm length	Hand span
9 ft 4 3/4 in (2.86 m)	150 lb (68 kg)	33 1/8 in (0.84 m)	9 1/2 in (0.24 m)
All values from NFL Combine

=== Cincinnati Bengals (first stint) ===
Chrisman was signed as an undrafted free agent by the Cincinnati Bengals on May 2, 2021. He was waived on August 31, 2021, and re-signed to the practice squad the next day. He was released on September 7, 2021. He was re-signed to the practice squad on October 5, 2021. He was released on October 12, 2021.

=== Pittsburgh Steelers ===
On December 8, 2021, Chrisman was signed to the Pittsburgh Steelers practice squad, but released two days later.

=== Cincinnati Bengals (second stint) ===
On December 14, 2021, Chrisman was signed to the Bengals practice squad. He was released on January 18, 2022. He signed a reserve/future contract with the Bengals on February 7, 2022.

On August 30, 2022, Chrisman was waived by the Bengals and signed to the practice squad the next day. He was signed to the active roster on December 6, 2022, following the release of veteran Kevin Huber. Chrisman's longest punt on the season came in his first start in Week 11 against the Pittsburgh Steelers, at 65 yards. Chrisman helped the team go 4–0 down the stretch, helping the Bengals finish the regular season with a 12–4 record, on their way to winning the AFC North Division Title. He was also the team's starting punter during their 2022 playoff run, including the AFC Championship Game.

Chrisman was released on August 29, 2023, after losing the Bengals starting job to sixth-round draft pick Brad Robbins.

=== Birmingham Stallions ===
On April 23, 2024, Chrisman signed with the Birmingham Stallions of the United Football League (UFL). He was released on May 20.
