= 2018 Big Ten Conference football season =

- League: NCAA Division I Football Bowl Subdivision
- Sport: Football
- Duration: August 30, 2018 through January 2019
- Teams: 14
- TV partner(s): ABC, ESPN2, ESPN Inc., Big Ten Network, FOX, FS1

2019 NFL Draft
- Top draft pick: Nick Bosa (Ohio State)
- Picked by: San Francisco 49ers, 2nd overall

Regular season
- Season MVP: Dwayne Haskins, OSU
- East Division champions: Ohio State & Michigan (co-champions)
- West Division champions: Northwestern

Championship Game
- Champions: Ohio State
- Runners-up: Northwestern
- Finals MVP: Dwayne Haskins

Football seasons
- 2017 2019

2018 Big Ten Conference football standings
	Conf.			Overall
Team	W		L	W		L
East Division
No. 3 Ohio State xy$	8	–	1	13	–	1
No. 14 Michigan x	8	–	1	10	–	3
No. 17 Penn State	6	–	3	9	–	4
Michigan State	5	–	4	7	–	6
Maryland	3	–	6	5	–	7
Indiana	2	–	7	5	–	7
Rutgers	0	–	9	1	–	11
West Division
No. 21 Northwestern xy	8	–	1	9	–	5
Wisconsin	5	–	4	8	–	5
No. 25 Iowa	5	–	4	9	–	4
Purdue	5	–	4	6	–	7
Minnesota	3	–	6	7	–	6
Nebraska	3	–	6	4	–	8
Illinois	2	–	7	4	–	8
Championship: Ohio State 45, Northwestern 24
$ – Conference champion; x – Division champion/co-champions; y – Championship game participant; Rankings from AP Poll

The 2018 Big Ten conference football season was the 123rd season of college football play for the Big Ten Conference and was part of the 2018 NCAA Division I FBS football season.

This was the Big Ten's fifth season with 14 teams. The defending league champion was Ohio State. The 2018 season consisted of a nine–game conference schedule for the third year in a row.

The Big Ten had one new coach for the 2018 season, with Nebraska hiring alumnus Scott Frost. Frost came to Nebraska after having coached UCF to an undefeated 13–0 season in 2017.

Ohio State head coach Urban Meyer was suspended for the first three games of the 2018 season by Ohio State for the mishandling of a situation involving domestic abuse charges against former assistant coach Zach Smith. Ohio State offensive coordinator Ryan Day served as acting head coach for the first three games of the 2018 season.

Maryland head coach D.J. Durkin was placed on administrative leave on August 11, 2018 due to the death of a player on his team, Jordan McNair, during summer workouts. On October 30, the school reinstated Durkin to his role as head coach, and was set to rejoin the team in Week #10. However, after a lot of negative reaction, a day later the University of Maryland decided to fire DJ Durkin.

Ohio State and Michigan shared the East Division title, but Ohio State advances to the championship game by virtue of its head-to-head win in the regular season finale. Northwestern clinched the West Division title on November 10. The Buckeyes went on to defeat the Wildcats in the conference championship game in Indianapolis by a score of 45-24 to win their second consecutive Big Ten championship and 37th conference crown in program history.

Nine Big Ten programs advanced to bowl games, with Ohio State and Michigan earning New Year's Six bowl bids in the Rose and Peach Bowls, respectively.

On December 4, 2018, Ohio State announced that head coach Urban Meyer would be stepping down following the Buckeyes' appearance in the Rose Bowl and that offensive coordinator Ryan Day, who served as interim head coach for the first three games of the season, would become the next head coach at Ohio State.

== Preseason ==
2018 Big Ten Spring Football and number of signees on signing day:

=== Recruiting classes ===
Rankings
Team	ESPN	Rivals	Scout & 24/7	Signees
Illinois	54	50	54	26
Indiana	48	45	50	27
Iowa	43	40	39	23
Maryland	31	29	28	24
Michigan	20	24	22	21
Michigan State	34	26	31	22
Minnesota	30	43	38	25
Nebraska	21	21	23	24
Northwestern	49	60	58	18
Ohio State	2	2	2	26
Penn State	4	5	6	23
Purdue	46	49	53	25
Rutgers	59	58	56	22
Wisconsin	39	40	46	20

=== Big Ten Media Days ===
The Big Ten conducted its annual media days at the Chicago Marriott Downtown Chicago Magnificent Mile in Chicago, IL on July 23–24. The event commenced with a speech by Big Ten commissioner Jim Delany, and all 14 teams sent their head coaches and two selected players to speak with members of the media. The event along with all speakers and interviews were broadcast live on the Big Ten Network. The teams and representatives in respective order were as follows:

=== Preseason media polls ===
The Big Ten Media Days concluded with its annual preseason media polls in early August. Since 1992, the credentialed media has gotten the preseason champion correct just five times. Only eight times has the preseason pick even made it to the Big Ten title game. Below are the results of the media poll with total points received next to each school and first-place votes in parentheses.

Big Ten Champion Voting
Ohio State def. Wisconsin - 14
Wisconsin def. Ohio State - 9
Wisconsin def. Michigan - 2
Wisconsin def. Penn State - 1
Wisconsin def. Michigan State - 1
Michigan State def. Wisconsin - 1

East Division
1. Ohio State (23.5) - 191.5 pts
2. Michigan State (2) - 142
3. Penn State (1) - 141.5
4. Michigan (1.5) - 140.5
5. Maryland - 75.5
6. Indiana - 60
7. Rutgers - 33

West Division
1. Wisconsin (28) - 196 pts
2. Iowa - 155
3. Northwestern - 138
4. Nebraska - 104
5. Purdue - 98.5
6. Minnesota - 64.5
7. Illinois - 28

== Rankings ==
		Pre	Wk 2	Wk 3	Wk 4	Wk 5	Wk 6	Wk 7	Wk 8	Wk 9	Wk 10	Wk 11	Wk 12	Wk 13	Wk 14	Wk 15	Final
Illinois	AP																
Illinois	C																
Illinois	CFP	Not released															
Indiana	AP																
Indiana	C																
Indiana	CFP	Not released															
Iowa	AP	RV	RV	RV	RV	RV	RV	RV	19	18	19	RV	RV	RV	RV	RV	25
Iowa	C	RV	RV	RV	RV	RV	RV	RV	22	18	18	RV		RV	RV	RV	RV
Iowa	CFP	Not released									16	21					
Maryland	AP		RV	RV		RV	RV		RV								
Maryland	C		RV	RV		RV	RV										
Maryland	CFP	Not released															
Michigan	AP	14	21	19	19	14	15	12	6	5	5	4	4	4	8	8	14
Michigan	C	14	22	22	21	15	16	13	7	5	5t	4	4	4	8	8	14
Michigan	CFP	Not released									5	4	4	4	7	7	
Michigan State	AP	11	15	25	24	21	20		24	RV	RV	24	RV				
Michigan State	C	12	13	24	23	18	19	RV	RV	RV	RV	RV	RV				
Michigan State	CFP	Not released										18					
Minnesota	AP																
Minnesota	C				RV												
Minnesota	CFP	Not released															
Nebraska	AP																
Nebraska	C																
Nebraska	CFP	Not released															
Northwestern	AP	RV	RV								RV	RV	24	20	21	RV	21
Northwestern	C	RV	RV								RV	RV	RV	21	21	22	19
Northwestern	CFP	Not released											22	19	21	22	
Ohio State	AP	5	4	4	4	4	3(1)	3 (1)	2 (1)	11	8	8	9	10	6	5	3
Ohio State	C	3(1)	4(1)	4(1)	4	4 (1)	3 (1)	3 (1)	2 (1)	9	8	7	8	10	6	5	3
Ohio State	CFP	Not released									10	10	10	10	6	6	
Penn State	AP	10	13	11	10t	9	11	8	18	17	14	21	16	15	14	13	17
Penn State	C	9	10	10	9	9	11	8	16	16	13	20	15	14	12	12	17
Penn State	CFP	Not released									14	20	14	12	12	12	
Purdue	AP									RV		RV					
Purdue	C									RV		RV					
Purdue	CFP	Not released															
Rutgers	AP																
Rutgers	C																
Rutgers	CFP	Not released															
Wisconsin	AP	4 (1)	5 (1)	6 (1)	18	15	16	15	23	20	RV	RV		RV			RV
Wisconsin	C	7	6	6	16	13	12	10	19	19	RV	RV	RV	RV	RV		RV
Wisconsin	CFP	Not released															

Legend
	Improvement in ranking
	Drop in ranking
	Not ranked previous week
	No change in ranking from previous week
RV	Received votes but were not ranked in Top 25 of poll
т	Tied with team above or below also with this symbol

== Schedule ==
Index to colors and formatting
Big Ten member won
Big Ten member lost
Big Ten teams in **bold**

All times Eastern time.

† denotes Homecoming game

=== Regular season ===
==== Week one ====
Date	Time	Visiting team	Home team	Site	TV	Result	Attendance	Ref.
August 30	7:00 p.m.	New Mexico State	**Minnesota**	TCF Bank Stadium • Minneapolis, MN	BTN	**W** 48–10	41,291	
August 30	8:00 p.m.	**Northwestern**	**Purdue**	Ross-Ade Stadium • West Lafayette, IN	ESPN	**NU** 31–27	47,410	
August 31	7:00 p.m.	Utah State	No. 11 **Michigan State**	Spartan Stadium • East Lansing, MI	BTN	**W** 38–31	73,114	
August 31	9:00 p.m.	Western Kentucky	No. 4 **Wisconsin**	Camp Randall Stadium • Madison, WI	ESPN	**W** 34–3	74,145	
September 1	12:00 p.m.	Kent State	**Illinois**	Memorial Stadium • Champaign, IL	BTN	**W** 31–24	31,898	
September 1	12:00 p.m.	Texas State	**Rutgers**	HighPoint.com Stadium • Piscataway, NJ	BTN	**W** 35–7	40,124	
September 1	12:00 p.m.	Oregon State	No. 5 **Ohio State**	Ohio Stadium • Columbus, OH	ABC	**W** 77–31	102,169	
September 1	12:00 p.m.	No. 23 Texas	**Maryland**	FedExField • Landover, MD	FS1	**W** 34–29	47,641	
September 1	3:30 p.m.	Northern Illinois	**Iowa**	Kinnick Stadium • Iowa City, IA	BTN	**W** 33–7	67,510	
September 1	3:30 p.m.	Appalachian State	No. 10 **Penn State**	Beaver Stadium • University Park, PA	BTN	**W** 45–38 ^{OT}	105,232	
September 1	7:00 p.m.	**Indiana**	FIU	Riccardo Silva Stadium • Miami, FL	CBSSN	**W** 38–28	17,082	
September 1	7:30 p.m.	No. 14 **Michigan**	No. 12 Notre Dame	Notre Dame Stadium • South Bend, IN (Michigan–Notre Dame football rivalry)	NBC	**L** 17–24	80,795	
~~September 1~~	~~8:00 p.m.~~	~~Akron~~	~~**Nebraska**~~	~~Memorial Stadium~~ • ~~Lincoln, NE~~	~~FOX~~	**Canceled**		
^{#}Rankings from AP Poll released prior to game. All times are in Eastern Time.

Date	Bye Week
September 1	Nebraska

==== Week two ====
Date	Time	Visiting team	Home team	Site	TV	Result	Attendance	Ref.
September 8	12:00 p.m.	Western Michigan	No. 21 **Michigan**	Michigan Stadium • Ann Arbor, MI	FS1	**W** 49–3	110,814	
September 8	12:00 p.m.	Duke	**Northwestern**	Ryan Field • Evanston, IL	ESPNU	**L** 7–21	40,654	
September 8	12:00 p.m.	New Mexico	No. 5 **Wisconsin**	Camp Randall Stadium • Madison, WI	BTN	**W** 45–14	77,003	
September 8	12:00 p.m.	Eastern Michigan	**Purdue**	Ross-Ade Stadium • West Lafayette, IN	BTN	**L** 19–20	47,661	
September 8	3:30 p.m.	Colorado	**Nebraska**	Memorial Stadium • Lincoln, NE (CU-NU Rivalry)	ABC	**L** 28–33	89,853	
September 8	3:30 p.m.	**Rutgers**	No. 4 **Ohio State**	Ohio Stadium • Columbus, OH	BTN	**OSU** 52–3	93,057	
September 8	5:00 p.m.	Iowa State	**Iowa**	Kinnick Stadium • Iowa City, IA (Cy-Hawk Series)	FOX	**W** 13–3	69,250	
September 8	6:00 p.m.	**Maryland**	Bowling Green	Doyt Perry Stadium • Bowling Green, OH	ESPN+	**W** 45–14	16,142	
September 8	7:30 p.m.	Fresno State	**Minnesota**	TCF Bank Stadium • Minneapolis, MN	FS1	**W** 21–14	38,280	
September 8	7:30 p.m.	Virginia	**Indiana**	Memorial Stadium • Bloomington, IN	BTN	**W** 20–16	35,492	
September 8	7:30 p.m.	Western Illinois	**Illinois**	Memorial Stadium • Champaign, IL	BTN	**W** 34–14	39,252	
September 8	8:00 p.m.	No. 13 **Penn State**	Pittsburgh	Heinz Field • Pittsburgh, PA (Keystone Classic)	ABC	**W** 51–6	68,400	
September 8	10:45 p.m.	No. 15 **Michigan State**	Arizona State	Sun Devil Stadium • Tempe, AZ	ESPN	**L** 13–16	53,599	
^{#}Rankings from AP Poll released prior to game. All times are in Eastern Time.

==== Week three ====
Date	Time	Visiting team	Home team	Site	TV	Result	Attendance	Ref.
September 15	12:00 p.m.	Kent State	No. 11 **Penn State**	Beaver Stadium • University Park, PA	FS1	**W** 63–10	106,528	
September 15	12:00 p.m.	Troy	**Nebraska**	Memorial Stadium • Lincoln, NE	BTN	**L** 19–24	89,360	
September 15	12:00 p.m.	Temple	**Maryland**	Maryland Stadium • College Park, MD	BTN	**L** 14–35	32,057	
September 15	12:00 p.m.	Ball State	**Indiana**	Memorial Stadium • Bloomington, IN	BTN	**W** 38–10	40,240	
September 15	12:00 p.m.	**Rutgers**	Kansas	Memorial Stadium • Lawrence, KS	FSN	**L** 14–55	28,044	
September 15	3:30 p.m.	BYU	No. 6 **Wisconsin**	Camp Randall Stadium • Madison, WI	ABC	**L** 21–24	80,720	
September 15	3:30 p.m.	SMU	No. 19 **Michigan**	Michigan Stadium • Ann Arbor, MI	BTN	**W** 45–20	110,549	
September 15	3:30 p.m.	South Florida	**Illinois**	Soldier Field • Chicago, IL	BTN	**L** 19–25	21,725	
September 15	3:30 p.m.	Miami (OH)	**Minnesota**	TCF Bank Stadium • Minneapolis, MN	BTN	**W** 26–3	41,162	
September 15	7:30 p.m.	Missouri	**Purdue**	Ross-Ade Stadium • West Lafayette, IN	BTN	**L** 37–40	48,103	
September 15	7:30 p.m.	Northern Iowa	**Iowa**	Kinnick Stadium • Iowa City, IA	BTN	**W** 38–14	69,250	
September 15	7:30 p.m.	Akron	**Northwestern**	Ryan Field • Evanston, IL	BTN	**L** 34–39	40,014	
September 15	8:00 p.m.	No. 4 **Ohio State**	No. 15 TCU	AT&T Stadium • Arlington, TX	ABC	**W** 40–28	64,362	
^{#}Rankings from AP Poll released prior to game. All times are in Eastern Time.

Date	Bye Week
September 15	No. 25 Michigan State

==== Week four ====
Date	Time	Visiting team	Home team	Site	TV	Result	Attendance	Ref.
September 21	9:00 p.m.	No. 10t **Penn State**	**Illinois**	Memorial Stadium • Champaign, IL	FS1	**PSU** 63–24	34,704	
September 22†	12:00 p.m.	No. 23 Boston College	**Purdue**	Ross-Ade Stadium • West Lafayette, IN	ESPN2	**W** 30–13	47,119	
September 22	12:00 p.m.	**Nebraska**	No. 19 **Michigan**	Michigan Stadium • Ann Arbor, MI	FS1	**MICH** 56–10	111,037	
September 22	12:00 p.m.	**Minnesota**	**Maryland**	Maryland Stadium • College Park, MD	BTN	**MD** 42–13	36,211	
September 22	12:00 p.m.	Buffalo	**Rutgers**	HighPoint.com Stadium • Piscataway, NJ	BTN	**L** 13–42	34,574	
September 22	3:30 p.m.	Tulane	No. 4 **Ohio State**	Ohio Stadium • Columbus, OH	BTN	**W** 49–6	103,336	
September 22	7:30 p.m.	No. 24 **Michigan State**	**Indiana**	Memorial Stadium • Bloomington, IN (Old Brass Spittoon)	BTN	**MSU** 35–21	45,445	
September 22	8:30 p.m.	No. 18 **Wisconsin**	**Iowa**	Kinnick Stadium • Iowa City, IA (Heartland Trophy)	FOX	**WIS** 28–17	69,250	
^{#}Rankings from AP Poll released prior to game. All times are in Eastern Time.

Date	Bye Week
September 22	Northwestern

==== Week five ====
Date	Time	Visiting team	Home team	Site	TV	Result	Attendance	Ref.
September 29	12:00 p.m.	**Indiana**	**Rutgers**	HighPoint.com Stadium • Piscataway, NJ	BTN	**IND** 24–17	32,056	
September 29	12:00 p.m.	Central Michigan	No. 21 **Michigan State**	Spartan Stadium • East Lansing, MI	FS1	**W** 31–20	73,752	
September 29	3:30 p.m.	No. 14 **Michigan**	**Northwestern**	Ryan Field • Evanston, IL	FOX	**MICH** 20–17	47,330	
September 29	3:30 p.m.	**Purdue**	**Nebraska**	Memorial Stadium • Lincoln, NE	BTN	**PUR** 42–28	88,911	
September 29	7:30 p.m.	No. 4 **Ohio State**	No. 9 **Penn State**	Beaver Stadium • University Park, PA (rivalry)	ABC	**OSU** 27–26	110,889	
^{#}Rankings from AP Poll released prior to game. All times are in Eastern Time.

Date	Bye Week				
September 29	Illinois	Iowa	Maryland	Minnesota	No. 15 Wisconsin

==== Week six ====
Date	Time	Visiting team	Home team	Site	TV	Result	Attendance	Ref.
October 6†	12:00 p.m.	Maryland	No. 15 **Michigan**	Michigan Stadium • Ann Arbor, MI	ABC	**MICH** 42–21	109,531	
October 6†	12:00 p.m.	Northwestern	No. 20 **Michigan State**	Spartan Stadium • East Lansing, MI	FS1	**NU** 29–19	72,850	
October 6	12:00 p.m.	Illinois	**Rutgers**	HighPoint.com Stadium • Piscataway, NJ	BTN	**ILL** 38–17	36,702	
October 6†	3:30 p.m.	Iowa	**Minnesota**	TCF Bank Stadium • Minneapolis, MN (Floyd of Rosedale)	BTN	**IA** 48–31	48,199	
October 6	4:00 p.m.	Indiana	No. 3 **Ohio State**	Ohio Stadium • Columbus, OH	FOX	**OSU** 49–26	104,193	
October 6	7:30 p.m.	Nebraska	No. 16 **Wisconsin**	Camp Randall Stadium • Madison, WI (Freedom Trophy)	BTN	**WIS** 41–24	80,051	
^{#}Rankings from AP Poll released prior to game. All times are in Eastern Time.

Date	Bye Week	
October 6	#11 Penn State	Purdue

==== Week seven ====
Date	Time	Visiting team	Home team	Site	TV	Result	Attendance	Ref.
October 13	12:00 p.m.	**Minnesota**	No. 3 **Ohio State**	Ohio Stadium • Columbus, OH	FS1	**OSU** 30–14	100,042	
October 13	12:00 p.m.	**Iowa**	**Indiana**	Memorial Stadium • Bloomington, IN	ESPN2	**IA** 42–16	40,512	
October 13†	12:00 p.m.	**Rutgers**	**Maryland**	Maryland Stadium • College Park, MD	BTN	**MD** 34–7	32,995	
October 13†	12:00 p.m.	**Nebraska**	**Northwestern**	Ryan Field • Evanston, IL	ABC	**NU** 34–31 ^{OT}	47,330	
October 13†	3:30 p.m.	**Purdue**	**Illinois**	Memorial Stadium • Champaign, IL (Purdue Cannon)	BTN	**PUR** 46–7	41,966	
October 13†	3:30 p.m.	**Michigan State**	No. 8 **Penn State**	Beaver Stadium • University Park, PA (Land Grant Trophy)	BTN	**MSU** 21–17	106,685	
October 13	7:30 p.m.	No. 15 **Wisconsin**	No. 12 **Michigan**	Michigan Stadium • Ann Arbor, MI	ABC	**MICH** 38–13	111,360	
^{#}Rankings from AP Poll released prior to game. All times are in Eastern Time.

==== Week eight ====
Date	Time	Visiting team	Home team	Site	TV	Result	Attendance	Ref.
October 20†	12:00 p.m.	**Maryland**	No. 19 **Iowa**	Kinnick Stadium • Iowa City, IA	ESPN2	**IA** 23–0	69,250	
October 20	12:00 p.m.	**Northwestern**	**Rutgers**	HighPoint.com Stadium • Piscataway, NJ	BTN	**NU** 18–15	32,514	
October 20	12:00 p.m.	**Illinois**	No. 23 **Wisconsin**	Camp Randall Stadium • Madison, WI	FS1	**WIS** 49–20	79,736	
October 20	12:00 p.m.	No. 6 **Michigan**	No. 24 **Michigan State**	Spartan Stadium • East Lansing, MI (Paul Bunyon Trophy)	FOX	**MICH** 21–7	76,131	
October 20	3:30 p.m.	No. 18 **Penn State**	**Indiana**	Memorial Stadium • Bloomington, IN	ABC	**PSU** 33–28	41,553	
October 20	3:30 p.m.	**Minnesota**	**Nebraska**	Memorial Stadium • Lincoln, NE ($5 Bits of Broken Chair Trophy)	BTN	**NEB** 53–28	89,272	
October 20	7:30 p.m.	No. 2 **Ohio State**	**Purdue**	Ross-Ade Stadium • West Lafayette, IN	ABC	**PUR** 49–20	60,716	
^{#}Rankings from AP Poll released prior to game. All times are in Eastern Time.

==== Week nine ====
Date	Time	Visiting team	Home team	Site	TV	Result	Attendance	Ref.
October 26	8:00 p.m.	**Indiana**	**Minnesota**	TCF Bank Stadium • Minneapolis, MN	FS1	**MIN** 38–31	33,273	
October 27	12:00 p.m.	**Purdue**	**Michigan State**	Spartan Stadium • East Lansing, MI	ESPN	**MSU** 23–13	72,657	
October 27	12:00 p.m.	Bethune–Cookman	**Nebraska**	Memorial Stadium • Lincoln, NE	BTN	**W** 45–9	88,735	
October 27	12:00 p.m.	No. 20 **Wisconsin**	**Northwestern**	Ryan Field • Evanston, IL	FOX	**NU** 31–17	47,330	
October 27	3:30 p.m.	**Illinois**	**Maryland**	Maryland Stadium • College Park, MD	BTN	**MD** 63–33	30,387	
October 27	3:30 p.m.	No. 18 **Iowa**	No. 17 **Penn State**	Beaver Stadium • University Park, PA	ESPN	**PSU** 30–24	105,244	
^{#}Rankings from AP Poll released prior to game. All times are in Eastern Time.

Date	Bye Week		
October 27	#5 Michigan	#11 Ohio State	Rutgers

Nebraska adds Bethune-Cookman to 2018 schedule in place of previously scheduled bye week to make up for Akron game that was canceled in Week 1 due to weather.

==== Week ten ====
Date	Time	Visiting team	Home team	Site	TV	Result	Attendance	Ref.
November 3	12:00 p.m.	**Nebraska**	No. 8 **Ohio State**	Ohio Stadium • Columbus, OH	FOX	**OSU** 36–31	104,245	
November 3	12:00 p.m.	**Michigan State**	**Maryland**	Maryland Stadium • College Park, MD	ESPN2	**MSU** 24–3	31,735	
November 3	12:00 p.m.	**Rutgers**	**Wisconsin**	Camp Randall Stadium • Madison, WI	BTN	**WIS** 31–17	74,379	
November 3	3:30 p.m.	**Minnesota**	**Illinois**	Memorial Stadium • Champaign, IL	BTN	**ILL** 55–31	35,774	
November 3	3:30 p.m.	No. 19 **Iowa**	**Purdue**	Ross-Ade Stadium • West Lafayette, IN	ESPN2	**PUR** 38–36	60,716	
November 3	3:45 p.m.	No. 14 **Penn State**	No. 5 **Michigan**	Michigan Stadium • Ann Arbor, MI	ESPN	**MICH** 42–7	111,747	
November 3	7:15 p.m.	No. 3 Notre Dame	**Northwestern**	Ryan Field • Evanston, IL (ND-NU Rivalry)	ESPN	**L** 21–31	47,330	
^{#}Rankings from AP Poll released prior to game. All times are in Eastern Time.

Date	Bye Week
November 3	Indiana

==== Week eleven ====
Date	Time	Visiting team	Home team	Site	TV	Result	Attendance	Ref.
November 10	12:00 p.m.	**Illinois**	**Nebraska**	Memorial Stadium • Lincoln, NE	BTN	**NEB** 54–35	88,316	
November 10	12:00 p.m.	**Maryland**	**Indiana**	Memorial Stadium • Bloomington, IN	BTN	**IND** 34–32	35,264	
November 10	12:00 p.m.	No. 8 **Ohio State**	No. 24 **Michigan State**	Spartan Stadium • East Lansing, MI	FOX	**OSU** 26–6	74,633	
November 10	12:00 p.m.	**Wisconsin**	No. 21 **Penn State**	Beaver Stadium • University Park, PA	ABC	**PSU** 22–10	105,396	
November 10	3:30 p.m.	**Northwestern**	**Iowa**	Kinnick Stadium • Iowa City, IA	FOX	**NU** 14–10	66,493	
November 10	3:30 p.m.	No. 4 **Michigan**	**Rutgers**	HighPoint.com Stadium • Piscataway, NJ	BTN	**MICH** 42–7	43,786	
November 10	3:30 p.m.	**Purdue**	**Minnesota**	TCF Bank Stadium • Minneapolis, MN	ESPN2	**MIN** 41–10	31,068	
^{#}Rankings from AP Poll released prior to game. All times are in Eastern Time.

==== Week twelve ====
Date	Time	Visiting team	Home team	Site	TV	Result	Attendance	Ref.
November 17	12:00 p.m.	**Michigan State**	**Nebraska**	Memorial Stadium • Lincoln, NE	FOX	**NEB** 9–6	88,793	
November 17	12:00 p.m.	No. 9 **Ohio State**	**Maryland**	Maryland Stadium • College Park, MD	ABC	**OSU** 52–51 ^{OT}	38,177	
November 17	12:00 p.m.	No. 24 **Northwestern**	**Minnesota**	TCF Bank Stadium • Minneapolis, MN	BTN	**NU** 24–14	32,134	
November 17	12:00 p.m.	No. 16 **Penn State**	**Rutgers**	HighPoint.com Stadium • Piscataway, NJ	BTN	**PSU** 20–7	44,840	
November 17	3:30 p.m.	**Iowa**	**Illinois**	Memorial Stadium • Champaign, IL	BTN	**IA** 63–0	33,313	
November 17	3:30 p.m.	**Wisconsin**	**Purdue**	Ross-Ade Stadium • West Lafayette, IN	BTN	**WIS** 47–44 ^{3OT}	46,114	
November 17	4:00 p.m.	**Indiana**	No. 4 **Michigan**	Michigan Stadium • Ann Arbor, MI	FS1	**MICH** 31–20	110,118	
^{#}Rankings from AP Poll released prior to game. All times are in Eastern Time.

==== Week thirteen ====
Date	Time	Visiting team	Home team	Site	TV	Result	Attendance	Ref.
November 23	12:00 p.m.	**Nebraska**	**Iowa**	Kinnick Stadium • Iowa City, IA (Heroes Game)	FOX	**IA** 31–28	65,299	
November 24	12:00 p.m.	No. 4 **Michigan**	No. 10 **Ohio State**	Ohio Stadium • Columbus, OH (The Game)	FOX	**OSU** 62–39	106,588	
November 24	12:00 p.m.	**Purdue**	**Indiana**	Memorial Stadium • Bloomington, IN (Old Oaken Bucket)	ESPN2	**PUR** 28–21	48,247	
November 24	3:30 p.m.	**Illinois**	No. 20 **Northwestern**	Ryan Field • Evanston, IL (Land of Lincoln Trophy)	BTN	**NU** 24–16	37,124	
November 24	3:30 p.m.	**Maryland**	No. 15 **Penn State**	Beaver Stadium • University Park, PA (MD-PSU Rivalry)	ABC	**PSU** 38–3	98,422	
November 24	3:30 p.m.	**Minnesota**	**Wisconsin**	Camp Randall Stadium • Madison, WI (Paul Bunyan's Axe)	ESPN2	**MIN** 37–15	74,038	
November 24	4:00 p.m.	**Rutgers**	**Michigan State**	Spartan Stadium • East Lansing, MI	FOX	**MSU** 14–10	64,951	
^{#}Rankings from AP Poll released prior to game. All times are in Eastern Time.

=== Championship game ===
==== Week 14 (Big Ten Championship Game) ====
Date	Time	Visiting team	Home team	Site	TV	Result	Attendance	Ref.
December 1	8:00 p.m.	No. 21 Northwestern	No. 6 Ohio State	Lucas Oil Stadium • Indianapolis, IN	FOX	**OSU** 45–24	66,375	
^{#}Rankings from AP Poll released prior to game. All times are in Eastern Time.

== Bowl games ==
Legend
Big Ten win
Big Ten loss

Bowl game	Date	Site	Television	Time (EST)	Big Ten team	Opponent	Score	Attendance
Quick Lane Bowl	December 26	Ford Field • Detroit, MI	ESPN	5:15 p.m.	Minnesota	Georgia Tech	34–10	27,228
Pinstripe Bowl	December 27	Yankee Stadium • New York, NY	ESPN	5:15 p.m.	Wisconsin	Miami (FL)	35–3	37,821
Music City Bowl	December 28	Nissan Stadium • Nashville, TN	ESPN	1:30 p.m.	Purdue	Auburn	14–63	59,024
Redbox Bowl	December 31	Levi's Stadium • Santa Clara, CA	FOX	3:00 p.m.	Michigan State	Oregon	6–7	30,212
Holiday Bowl	December 31	SDCCU Stadium • San Diego, CA	FS1	7:00 p.m.	Northwestern	No. 20 Utah	31–20	47,007
Outback Bowl	January 1	Raymond James Stadium • Tampa, FL	ESPN2	12:00 p.m.	Iowa	No. 18 Mississippi State	27–22	40,518
Citrus Bowl	January 1	Camping World Stadium • Orlando, FL	ABC	1:00 p.m.	No. 13 Penn State	No. 16 Kentucky	24–27	59,167
New Year's Six Bowls
Peach Bowl	December 29	Mercedes-Benz Stadium • Atlanta, GA	ESPN	12:00 p.m.	No. 8 Michigan	No. 10 Florida	15–41	74,006
Rose Bowl	January 1	Rose Bowl • Pasadena, CA	ESPN	5:00 p.m.	No. 5 Ohio State	No. 9 Washington	28–23	91,853

Rankings are from AP Poll. All times Eastern Time Zone.

== Big Ten records vs other conferences ==
2018–2019 records against non-conference foes:

(Through games of January 1, 2019)

Regular season

Power 5 conferences	Record
ACC	3–1
Big 12	3–1
Pac-12	1–2
BYU/Notre Dame	0–2
SEC	0–1
Power 5 total	7–8
Other FBS conferences	Record
American	2-2
C-USA	2–0
Independents (Excluding BYU and Notre Dame)	1–0
MAC	8–3
Mountain West	3–0
Sun Belt	2–1
Other FBS total	18–6
FCS ppponents	Record
Football Championship Subdivision	3–0
Total non-conference record	28–14

Postseason

Power Conferences 5	Record
ACC	2–0
Big 12	0–0
Pac-12	2–1
BYU/Notre Dame	0-0
SEC	1–3
Power 5 total	5–4
Other FBS Conferences	Record
American	0–0
C–USA	0–0
Independents (Excluding Notre Dame)	0–0
MAC	0–0
Mountain West	0–0
Sun Belt	0-0
Other FBS total	0–0
Total bowl record	5–4

== Awards and honors ==
=== Player of the week honors ===
Week	Offensive			Defensive			Special Teams			Freshman		
Week	Player	Position	Team	Player	Position	Team	Player	Position	Team	Player	Position	Team
Week 1	Dwayne Haskins	QB	OSU	Jake Hansen	LB	ILL	Ambry Thomas	KR	MICH	Jeshaun Jones	WR	MD
Week 1	Dwayne Haskins	QB	OSU	Antoine Brooks	DB	MD	Antoine Winfield Jr.	PR	MIN	Rondale Moore	WR	PUR
Week 2	Jonathan Taylor	RB	WIS	A. J. Epenesa	DE	IA	Emmit Carpenter	K	MIN	Stevie Scott	RB	IND
Week 2	Jonathan Taylor	RB	WIS	Antoine Winfield Jr.	DB	MIN	Emmit Carpenter	K	MIN	Tate Martell	QB	OSU
Week 3	David Blough	QB	PUR	Dre'Mont Jones	DT	OSU	J-Shun Harris II	WR	IND	Stevie Scott	RB	IND
Week 4	Dwayne Haskins	QB	OSU	Tre Watson	LB	MD	Donovan Peoples-Jones	WR	MICH	Anthony McFarland	RB	MD
Week 4	Miles Sanders	RB	PSU	Tre Watson	LB	MD	Matt Coghlin	K	MSU	Rondale Moore	WR	PUR
Week 5	Dwayne Haskins	QB	OSU	Chase Winovich	DL	MICH	Joe Schopper	P	PUR	K. J. Hamler	WR	PSU
Week 5	Dwayne Haskins	QB	OSU	Chase Young	DE	OSU	Joe Schopper	P	PUR	K. J. Hamler	WR	PSU
Week 6	Dwayne Haskins	QB	OSU	Anthony Nelson	DE	IA	Ty Johnson	KR	MD	Riley Moss	DB	IA
Week 7	Nate Stanley	QB	IA	Khari Willis	S	MSU	Drew Luckenbaugh	K	NU	Mohamed Ibrahim	RB	MIN
Week 7	Flynn Nagel	WR	NU	Khari Willis	S	MSU	Drew Luckenbaugh	K	NU	Mohamed Ibrahim	RB	MIN
Week 8	David Blough	QB	PUR	Markus Bailey	LB	PUR	Joe Schopper	P	PUR	Adrian Martinez	QB	NEB
Week 8	David Blough	QB	PUR	Markus Bailey	LB	PUR	Joe Schopper	P	PUR	Rondale Moore	WR	PUR
Week 9	Javon Leake	RB	MD	Yetur Gross-Matos	DE	PSU	Javon Leake	RB	MD	Rocky Lombardi	QB	MSU
Week 9	Javon Leake	RB	MD	Yetur Gross-Matos	DE	PSU	Javon Leake	RB	MD	Tanner Morgan	QB	MIN
Week 10	Reggie Corbin	RB	ILL	Joe Bachie	LB	MSU	Spencer Evans	K	PUR	Rashod Bateman	WR	MIN
Week 10	Terry Wright	WR	PUR	Joe Bachie	LB	MSU	Spencer Evans	K	PUR	Adrian Martinez	QB	NEB
Week 11	Devine Ozigbo	RB	NEB	Robert Windsor	DT	PSU	Logan Justus	K	IND	Adrian Martinez	QB	NEB
Week 12	Dwayne Haskins	QB	OSU	A. J. Epenesa	DE	IA	Jake Moody	K	MICH	Anthony McFarland	RB	MD
Week 12	Jonathan Taylor	RB	WIS	Antonio Reed	S	NEB	Barret Pickering	K	NEB	Anthony McFarland	RB	MD
Week 13	Dwayne Haskins	QB	OSU	Anthony Nelson	DE	IA	Demetrius Douglas	PR	MIN	Rondale Moore	WR	PUR
Week 13	Dwayne Haskins	QB	OSU	Josiah Scott	CB	MSU	Demetrius Douglas	PR	MIN	Rondale Moore	WR	PUR

=== Big Ten individual awards ===
The following individuals won the conference's annual player and coach awards:

Award	Player	School
Graham-George Offensive Player of the Year	Dwayne Haskins	Ohio State
Nagurski-Woodson Defensive Player of the Year	Devin Bush Jr.	Michigan
Thompson-Randle El Freshman of the Year	Rondale Moore	Purdue
Griese-Brees Quarterback of the Year	Dwayne Haskins	Ohio State
Richter-Howard Receiver of the Year	Rondale Moore	Purdue
Ameche-Dayne Running Back of the Year	Jonathan Taylor	Wisconsin
Kwalick-Clark Tight End of the Year	T. J. Hockenson	Iowa
Rimington-Pace Offensive Lineman of the Year	Michael Deiter	Wisconsin
Smith-Brown Defensive Lineman of the Year	Kenny Willekes	Michigan State
Butkus-Fitzgerald Linebacker of the Year	Devin Bush	Michigan
Tatum-Woodson Defensive Back of the Year	Amani Hooker	Iowa
Bakken-Andersen Kicker of the Year	Chase McLaughlin	Illinois
Eddleman-Fields Punter of the Year	Will Hart	Michigan
Rodgers-Dwight Return Specialist of the Year	Ihmir Smith-Marsette	Iowa
Hayes-Schembechler Coach of the Year (coaches vote)	Pat Fitzgerald	Northwestern
Dave McClain Coach of the Year (media vote)	Pat Fitzgerald	Northwestern
Dungy-Thompson Humanitarian Award	Jake Wood	Wisconsin
Ford-Kinnick Leadership Award	Antwaan Randle El	Indiana

=== All-Conference Teams ===
2018 Big Ten All-Conference Teams and Awards

Position	Player	Team
First Team Offense (Coaches)
QB	Dwayne Haskins	Ohio State
RB	Jonathan Taylor	Wisconsin
RB	Karan Higdon	Michigan
WR	Rondale Moore	Purdue
WR	Parris Campbell	Ohio State
TE	Noah Fant	Iowa
C	Tyler Biadasz	Wisconsin
OG	Michael Deiter	Wisconsin
OG	Beau Benzschawel	Wisconsin
OT	Jon Runyan	Michigan
OT	Isaiah Prince	Ohio State
First Team Defense (Coaches)
DL	Chase Winovich	Michigan
DL	Rashan Gary	Michigan
DL	Kenny Willekes	Michigan State
DL	Dre'mont Jones	Ohio State
LB	Devin Bush Jr.	Michigan
LB	Joe Bachie	Michigan State
LB	Paddy Fisher	Northwestern
DB	Amani Hooker	Iowa
DB	Lavert Hill	Michigan
DB	David Long	Michigan
DB	Amani Oruwariye	Penn State
First Team Special Teams (Coaches)
K	Chase McLaughlin	Illinois
P	Will Hart	Michigan
RS	Rondale Moore	Purdue

Position	Player	Team
Second Team Offense (Coaches)
QB	Trace McSorley	Penn State
RB	J. K. Dobbins	Ohio State
RB	Miles Sanders	Penn State
WR	Stanley Morgan Jr.	Nebraska
WR	Tyler Johnson	Minnesota
TE	T. J. Hockenson	Iowa
C	Michael Jordan	Ohio State
OG	Ross Reynolds	Iowa
OG	Ben Bredeson	Michigan
OT	Alaric Jackson	Iowa
OT	David Edwards	Wisconsin
Second Team Defense (Coaches)
DL	A. J. Epenesa	Iowa
DL	Carter Coughlin	Minnesota
DL	Joe Gaziano	Northwestern
DL	Chase Young	Ohio State
LB	Tre Watson	Maryland
LB	Markus Bailey	Purdue
LB	T. J. Edwards	Wisconsin
DB	Antoine Brooks	Maryland
DB	Darnell Savage	Maryland
DB	Josh Metellus	Michigan
DB	Justin Layne	Michigan State
Second Team Special Teams (Coaches)
K	Logan Justus	Indiana
P	Drue Chrisman	Ohio State
RS	Ihmir Smith-Marsette	Iowa

Position	Player	Team
Third Team Offense (Coaches)
QB	Shea Patterson	Michigan
RB	Reggie Corbin	Illinois
RB	Anthony McFarland Jr.	Maryland
WR	JD Spielman	Nebraska
WR	Donovan Peoples-Jones	Michigan
TE	Zach Gentry	Michigan
C	Cesar Ruiz	Michigan
OG	Michael Onwenu	Michigan
OG	Connor McGovern	Penn State
OT	Rashawn Slater	Northwestern
OT	Ryan Bates	Penn State
Third Team Defense (Coaches)
DL	Anthony Nelson	Iowa
DL	Raequan Williams	Michigan State
DL	Yetur Gross-Matos	Penn State
DL	Shareef Miller	Penn State
LB	Blake Cashman	Minnesota
LB	Ryan Connelly	Wisconsin
LB	Andrew Van Ginkel	Wisconsin
DB	David Dowell	Michigan State
DB	Dicaprio Bootle	Nebraska
DB	Montre Hartage	Northwestern
DB	D'Cota Dixon	Wisconsin
Third Team Special Teams (Coaches)
K	Matt Coghlin	Michigan State
P	Joe Schopper	Purdue
RS	Donovan Peoples-Jones	Michigan

Coaches Honorable Mention: ILLINOIS: Nick Allegretti, Blake Hayes; INDIANA: Marcelino Ball, Jonathan Crawford, Donovan Hale, J-Shun Harris II, Brandon Knight, Wes Martin, Stevie Scott; IOWA: Jake Gervase, Matt Nelson, Miguel Recinos, Keegan Render, Tristan Wirfs; MARYLAND: Byron Cowart, Tino Ellis, Derwin Gray, Ty Johnson, Wade Lees, Brendan Moore, Joseph Petrino; MICHIGAN: Juwann Bushell-Beatty, Nico Collins, Bryan Mone, Josh Ross, Josh Uche, Khaleke Hudson, Tyree Kinnel; MICHIGAN STATE: Felton Davis III, Andrew Dowell, Khari Willis, Mike Panasiuk; MINNESOTA: Emmit Carpenter, Donnell Greene, Jacob Huff, Jacob Herbers; NEBRASKA: Isaac Armstrong, Mohamed Barry, Carlos Davis, Luke Gifford, Brenden Jaimes, Adrian Martinez, Devine Ozigbo; NORTHWESTERN: Blake Gallagher, Cameron Green, Flynn Nagel, J.R. Pace, Nate Hall, Clayton Thorson; OHIO STATE: Damon Arnette, Tuf Borland, Jonathon Cooper, Jordan Fuller, Malik Harrison, K. J. Hill, Demetrius Knox, Robert Landers, Thayer Munford, Jeffrey Okudah, Malcolm Pridgeon, Kendall Sheffield, Mike Weber; PENN STATE: Pat Freiermuth, Steven Gonzalez, K. J. Hamler, Garrett Taylor, John Reid, Robert Windsor; PURDUE: Derrick Barnes, Kirk Barron, Antonio Blackmon, David Blough, Spencer Evans, Brycen Hopkins, D.J. Knox, Matt McCann, Jacob Thineneman; RUTGERS: Rahmeem Blackshear, Justin Davidovicz, Saquan Hampton, Jonah Jackson, Adam Korsack; WISCONSIN: Jake Ferguson, Rafael Gaglianone.

Position	Player	Team
First Team Offense (Media)
QB	Dwayne Haskins	Ohio State
RB	Karan Higdon	Michigan
RB	Jonathan Taylor	Wisconsin
WR	Tyler Johnson	Minnesota
WR	Rondale Moore	Purdue
TE	T. J. Hockenson	Iowa
C	Tyler Biadasz	Wisconsin
OG	Beau Benzschawel	Wisconsin
OG	Michael Deiter	Wisconsin
OT	Isaiah Prince	Ohio State
OT	David Edwards	Wisconsin
First Team Defense (Media)
DL	A. J. Epenesa	Iowa
DL	Chase Winovich	Michigan
DL	Kenny Willekes	Michigan State
DL	Yetur Gross-Matos	Penn State
LB	Tre Watson	Maryland
LB	Devin Bush Jr.	Michigan
LB	T. J. Edwards	Wisconsin
DB	Amani Hooker	Iowa
DB	Lavert Hill	Michigan
DB	Montre Hartage	Northwestern
DB	Amani Oruwariye	Penn State
First Team Special Teams (Media)
K	Matt Coghlin	Michigan State
P	Will Hart	Michigan
RS	Ihmir Smith-Marsette	Iowa

Position	Player	Team
Second Team Offense (Media)
QB	Trace McSorley	Penn State
RB	Anthony McFarland Jr.	Maryland
RB	Miles Sanders	Penn State
WR	Stanley Morgan Jr.	Nebraska
WR	Parris Campbell	Ohio State
TE	Noah Fant	Iowa
C	Michael Jordan	Ohio State
OG	Nick Allegretti	Illinois
OG	Ben Bredeson	Michigan
OT	Alaric Jackson	Iowa
OT	Jon Runyan Jr.	Michigan
Second Team Defense (Media)
DL	Anthony Nelson	Iowa
DL	Rashan Gary	Michigan
DL	Carter Coughlin	Minnesota
DL	Dre'Mont Jones	Ohio State
LB	Joe Bachie	Michigan State
LB	Blake Cashman	Minnesota
LB	Paddy Fisher	Northwestern
DB	Darnell Savage	Maryland
DB	Josh Metellus	Michigan
DB	Justin Layne	Michigan State
DB	Jordan Fuller	Ohio State
Second Team Special Teams (Media)
K	Chase McLaughlin	Illinois
P	Drue Chrisman	Ohio State
RS	Rondale Moore	Purdue

Position	Player	Team
Third Team Offense (Media)
QB	David Blough	Purdue
RB	Reggie Corbin	Illinois
RB	Devine Ozigbo	Nebraska
WR	JD Spielman	Nebraska
WR	K. J. Hill	Ohio State
TE	Brycen Hopkins	Purdue
C	Keegan Render	Iowa
OG	Ross Reynolds	Iowa
OG	Demetrius Knox	Ohio State
OG	Connor McGovern	Penn State
OT	Damian Prince	Maryland
OT	Ryan Bates	Penn State
Third Team Defense (Media)
DL	Raequan Williams	Michigan State
DL	Joe Gaziano	Northwestern
DL	Chase Young	Ohio State
DL	Shareef Miller	Penn State
LB	Mohamed Barry	Nebraska
LB	Blake Gallagher	Northwestern
LB	Markus Bailey	Purdue
DB	David Long	Michigan
DB	Khari Willis	Michigan State
DB	Dicaprio Bootle	Nebraska
DB	D'Cota Dixon	Wisconsin
Third Team Special Teams (Media)
K	Logan Justus	Indiana
P	Blake Hayes	Illinois
RS	Donovan Peoples-Jones	Michigan

Media Honorable Mention: ILLINOIS: Del'Shawn Phillips, Alex Palczewski, Bobby Roundtree; INDIANA: Marcelino Ball, Jonathan Crawford, J-Shun Harris II, Brandon Knight, Wes Martin, Stevie Scott; IOWA: Jake Gervase, Parker Hesse, Matt Nelson, Miguel Recinos, Ihmir Smith-Marsette, Geno Stone, Tristan Wirfs; MARYLAND: Antoine Brooks, Byron Cowart, Tino Ellis, Derwin Gray, Ty Johnson, Wade Lees, Brendan Moore, Joseph Petrino; MICHIGAN: Juwann Bushell-Beatty, Zach Gentry, Khaleke Hudson, Tyree Kinnel, Sean McKeon, Michael Onwenu, Shea Patterson, Kwity Paye, Donovan Peoples-Jones, Cesar Ruiz, Josh Uche; MICHIGAN STATE: Felton Davis III, Andrew Dowell, David Dowell, Connor Heyward, Mike Panasiuk; MINNESOTA: Blaise Andries, Emmit Carpenter, Demetrius Douglas, Daniel Faalele, Donnell Greene, Jacob Herbers, Jacob Huff, Mohamed Ibrahim, Conner Olson, Jared Weyler; NEBRASKA: Isaac Armstrong, Khalil Davis, Luke Gifford, Brenden Jaimes, Adrian Martinez, Boe Wilson; NORTHWESTERN: Cameron Green, Nate Hall, Flynn Nagel, J.R. Pace, Rashawn Slater, Clayton Thorson; OHIO STATE: Damon Arnette, Tuf Borland, Nick Bosa, Jonathon Cooper, J. K. Dobbins, Malik Harrison, Terry McLaurin, Thayer Munford, Malcolm Pridgeon, Kendall Sheffield, Pete Werner; PENN STATE: Pat Freiermuth, Steven Gonzalez, K. J. Hamler, Micah Parsons, John Reid, Nick Scott, Garrett Taylor, Robert Windsor; PURDUE: Kirk Barron, Antonio Blackmon, Spencer Evans, Kenneth Major, Matt McCann, Lorenzo Neal, Joe Schopper, Jacob Thineneman, Isaac Zico; RUTGERS: Saquan Hampton, Jonah Jackson, Adam Korsack, Trevor Morris; WISCONSIN: Ryan Connelly, Jake Ferguson, Andrew Van Ginkel.

=== All-Americans ===
The 2018 College Football All-America Team is composed of the following College Football All-American first teams chosen by the following selector organizations: Associated Press (AP), Football Writers Association of America (FWAA), American Football Coaches Association (AFCA), Walter Camp Foundation (WCFF), The Sporting News (TSN), Sports Illustrated (SI), USA Today (USAT) ESPN, CBS Sports (CBS), FOX Sports (FOX) College Football News (CFN), Bleacher Report (BR), Scout.com, Phil Steele (PS), SB Nation (SB), Athlon Sports, Pro Football Focus (PFF) and Yahoo! Sports (Yahoo!).

Currently, the NCAA compiles consensus all-America teams in the sports of Division I-FBS football and Division I men's basketball using a point system computed from All-America teams named by coaches associations or media sources. The system consists of three points for a first-team honor, two points for second-team honor, and one point for third-team honor. Honorable mention and fourth team or lower recognitions are not accorded any points. Football consensus teams are compiled by position and the player accumulating the most points at each position is named first team consensus all-American. Currently, the NCAA recognizes All-Americans selected by the AP, AFCA, FWAA, TSN, and the WCFF to determine Consensus and Unanimous All-Americans. Any player named to the First Team by all five of the NCAA-recognized selectors is deemed a Unanimous All-American.

Position	Player	School	Selector	Unanimous	Consensus
First Team All-Americans
RB	Jonathan Taylor	Wisconsin	AFCA, AP, FWAA, TSN, WCFF, SI, BR, CFN, CBS, Athlon	*	*
WR	Rondale Moore	Purdue	CFN		
TE	T. J. Hockenson	Iowa	AFCA, BR		
OG	Beau Benzschawel	Wisconsin	AFCA, AP, WCFF, SI, BR, CFN, ESPN, CBS, Athlon		*
OG	Michael Deiter	Wisconsin	FWAA, BR		
C	Michael Jordan	Ohio State	CBS, SI, BR		
DT	Dre'Mont Jones	Ohio State	CFN		
LB	Devin Bush Jr.	Michigan	AFCA, FWAA, TSN, WCFF, SI, BR, CFN, CBS		*
AP	Rondale Moore	Purdue	AP, FWAA, SI, ESPN, CBS, Athlon		*

Position	Player	School	Selector
Second Team All-Americans
TE	T.J. Hockenson	Iowa	AP, FWAA, WCFF, Athlon
OG	Michael Deiter	Wisconsin	AFCA, AP, TSN, WCFF, CFN
OG	Beau Benzschawel	Wisconsin	TSN
C	Michael Jordan	Ohio State	WCFF
DE	Chase Winovich	Michigan	AFCA, WCFF, CFN, Athlon
DE	Kenny Willekes	Michigan State	FWAA, TSN, WCFF
LB	Devin Bush	Michigan	AP, Athlon
LB	Tre Watson	Maryland	FWAA
S	Amani Hooker	Iowa	AP, CFN
P	Will Hart	Michigan	SI
AP	Rondale Moore	Purdue	TSN

Position	Player	School	Selector
Third Team All-Americans
QB	Dwayne Haskins	Ohio State	AP, Athlon
TE	Noah Fant	Iowa	AP
C	Michael Jordan	Ohio State	AP
C	Tyler Biadasz	Wisconsin	Athlon
OL	Michael Deiter	Wisconsin	Athlon
DE	Chase Winovich	Michigan	AP
LB	Paddy Fisher	Northwestern	AP
CB	Lavert Hill	Michigan	AP
S	Amani Hooker	Iowa	Athlon
KR	Ihmir Smith-Marsette	Iowa	Athlon

Position	Player	School	Selector
Fourth Team All-Americans
DE	Kenny Willekes	Michigan State	Athlon
DT	Dre'Mont Jones	Ohio State	Athlon
CB	David Long	Michigan	Athlon
P	Drue Chrisman	Ohio State	Athlon

*AFCA All-America Team (AFCA)
*Walter Camp Football Foundation All-America Team (WCFF)
*Associated Press All-America Team (AP)
*The Sporting News All-America Team (TSN)
*Football Writers Association of America All-America Team (FWAA)
*Sports Illustrated All-America Team (SI)
*Bleacher Report All-America Team (BR)
*College Football News All-America Team (CFN)
*ESPN All-America Team (ESPN)
*CBS Sports All-America Team (CBS)
*Athlon Sports All-America Team (Athlon)

=== National award winners ===
2018 College Football Award Winners

Doak Walker Award (Nation's Top Running Back)
Jonathan Taylor, Wisconsin

John Mackey Award (Outstanding Tight End)
T. J. Hockenson, Iowa

Paul Hornung Award (Most Versatile Player)
Rondale Moore, Purdue

=== Academic All-Americans ===
2018 CoSIDA Academic-All Americans

Player	School	Team
CoSIDA Academic All-Americans
Payton Jordahl	Minnesota	First Team
Gary Moore	Minnesota	First Team
Jordan Fuller	Ohio State	First Team
Blake Gillikin	Penn State	First Team
Anthony Nelson	Iowa	Second Team
Cole Chewins	Michigan State	Second Team
Sam Renner	Minnesota	Second Team
Joe Schopper	Purdue	Second Team

== Home attendance ==
Team	Stadium	Capacity	Game 1	Game 2	Game 3	Game 4	Game 5	Game 6	Game 7	Total	Average	% of Capacity
Illinois	Memorial Stadium	60,670	31,898	39,252	21,725‡	34,704	41,966	35,774	33,313	238,632	34,090	56.2%
Indiana	Memorial Stadium	52,656	35,492	40,240	45,445	40,512	41,553	35,264	48,247	286,753	40,965	77.8%
Iowa	Kinnick Stadium	69,250	67,510	69,250	69,250	69,250	69,250	66,493	65,299	476,302	68,043	98.3%
Maryland	Maryland Stadium	51,802	32,057	36,211	32,995	30,387	31,735	38,177		201,562	33,594	64.9%
Michigan	Michigan Stadium	107,601	**110,814**	**110,549**	**111,037**	**109,531**	**111,360**	**111,747**	**110,118**	775,156	110,737	102.9%
Michigan State	Spartan Stadium	75,005	73,114	73,752	72,850	**76,131**	72,657	74,633	64,951	508,088	72,584	96.8%
Minnesota	TCF Bank Stadium	50,805	41,291	38,280	41,162	48,199	33,273	31,068	32,134	265,407	37,915	74.6%
Nebraska	Memorial Stadium	85,458	**89,853**	**89,360**	**88,911**	**89,272**	**88,735**	**88,316**	**88,793**	623,240	89,034	104.2%
Northwestern	Ryan Field	47,130	40,654	40,014	**47,330**	**47,330**	**47,330**	**47,330**	37,124	307,112	43,873	93.1%
Ohio State	Ohio Stadium	102,082	**102,169**	93,057	**103,336**	**104,193**	100,042	**104,245**	**106,588**	713,630	101,947	99.9%
Penn State	Beaver Stadium	106,572	105,232	106,528	**110,889**	**106,685**	105,244	105,396	98,422	738,396	105,485	99.0%
Purdue	Ross–Ade Stadium	57,236	47,410	47,661	48,103	47,119	**60,716**	**60,716**	46,114	357,839	51,120	89.3%
Rutgers	HighPoint.com Stadium	52,454	40,124	34,574	32,056	36,702	32,514	43,786	44,840	264,596	37,799	72.1%
Wisconsin	Camp Randall Stadium	80,321	74,145	77,003	**80,720**	80,051	79,736	74,379	74,038	540,072	77,153	96.1%

Bold – Exceed capacity
†Season High
‡Played at Soldier Field

== 2019 NFL draft ==
Team	Round 1	Round 2	Round 3	Round 4	Round 5	Round 6	Round 7	Total
Illinois	–	–	–	–	–	–	1	1
Indiana	–	–	–	1	–	–	–	1
Iowa	2	–	–	2	–	–	–	4
Maryland	1	–	–	–	1	1	1	4
Michigan	2	–	1	–	1	–	–	4
Michigan State	–	–	1	1	–	–	–	2
Minnesota	–	–	–	–	1	–	–	1
Nebraska	–	–	–	–	–	–	–	0
Northwestern	–	–	–	–	1	–	–	1
Ohio State	2	1	2	2	–	1	1	9
Penn State	–	1	1	1	1	1	1	6
Purdue	–	–	–	–	–	–	–	0
Rutgers	–	–	–	–	–	2	–	2
Wisconsin	–	–	1	–	3	–	–	4

*	= Compensatory Selections

Rnd.	Pick	Team	Player	Pos.	College	Notes
1	2	San Francisco 49ers	Nick Bosa	DE	Ohio State	
1	8	Detroit Lions	T. J. Hockenson	TE	Iowa	
1	10	Pittsburgh Steelers	Devin Bush	LB	Michigan	from Denver (Note: Round 1 — No. 10: Denver → Pittsburgh (D). Denver traded a first-round selection (10th) to Pittsburgh in exchange for Pittsburgh's first- and second-round selections (20th, and 52nd) as well as their third-round selection in 2020.)
1	12	Green Bay Packers	Rashan Gary	DE	Michigan	
1	15	Washington Redskins	Dwayne Haskins	QB	Ohio State	
1	20	Denver Broncos	Noah Fant	TE	Iowa	from Pittsburgh (Note: Round 1 — No. 20: Pittsburgh → Denver (D). see No. 10: Denver → Pittsburgh.)
1	21	Green Bay Packers	Darnell Savage Jr.	S	Maryland	from Seattle (Note: Round 1 — No. 21: Seattle → Green Bay (D). Seattle traded a first-round selection (21st) to Green Bay in exchange for Green Bay's first- and two fourth-round selections (30th, 114th and 118th).)
2	53	Philadelphia Eagles	Miles Sanders	RB	Penn State	from Baltimore (Note: Round 2 — No. 53: Baltimore → Philadelphia (PD). Baltimore traded a second-round selection (53rd) as well as 2018 second- and fourth-round selections (52nd and 125th) to Philadelphia in exchange for Philadelphia's 2018 first- and fourth-round selections (32nd and 132nd).)
2	59	Indianapolis Colts	Parris Campbell	WR	Ohio State	
3	71	Denver Broncos	Dre'mont Jones	DT	Ohio State	
3	76	Washington Redskins	Terry McLaurin	WR	Ohio State	
3	77	New England Patriots	Chase Winovich	DE	Michigan	from Carolina via Seattle (Note: Round 3 — No. 77: multiple trades: –Carolina → Seattle (D). see No. 37: Seattle → Carolina. –Seattle → New England (D). see No. 64: New England → Seattle.)
3	78	Miami Dolphins	Michael Deiter	G	Wisconsin	
3	79	Los Angeles Rams	David Long	CB	Michigan	from Atlanta (Note: Round 3 — No. 79: Atlanta → LA Rams (D). see No. 31: LA Rams → Atlanta.)
3	83	Pittsburgh Steelers	Justin Layne	CB	Michigan State	
3	90	Dallas Cowboys	Connor McGovern	G	Penn State	
4	107	Tampa Bay Buccaneers	Anthony Nelson	DE	Iowa	
4	109	Oakland Raiders	Khari Willis	S	Michigan State	from Jacksonville (Note: Round 4 — No. 109: Jacksonville → Oakland (D). see No. 35: Oakland → Jacksonville.)
4	111	Detroit Lions	Kendall Sheffield	CB	Ohio State	
4	116	Tennessee Titans	Amani Hooker	S	Iowa	from Miami
4	131	Washington Redskins	Wes Martin	G	Indiana	from Kansas City via Buffalo (Note: Round 4 — No. 131: multiple trades: –Kansas City → Buffalo (PD). Kansas City traded a conditional fourth-round selection to Buffalo in exchange for linebacker Reggie Ragland. –Buffalo → Washington (D). see No. 96: Washington → Buffalo.)
4*	136	Cincinnati Bengals	Michael Jordan	G	Ohio State	from Dallas
4*	138	Philadelphia Eagles	Shareef Miller	DE	Penn State	
5	141	Pittsburgh Steelers	Zach Gentry	TE	Michigan	from Oakland (Note: Round 5 — No. 141: Oakland → Pittsburgh (PD). See No. 66: Oakland → Pittsburgh.)
5	143	New York Giants	Ryan Connelly	LB	Wisconsin	
5	146	Detroit Lions	Amani Oruwariye	CB	Penn State	
5	151	Miami Dolphins	Andrew Van Ginkel	LB	Wisconsin	
5	157	New York Jets	Blake Cashman	LB	Minnesota	from Tennessee
5	159	New England Patriots	Byron Cowart	DT	Maryland	from Minnesota via Seattle (Note: Round 5 — No. 159: Seattle → Minnesota (D). see No. 88: Minnesota → Seattle.)
5	167	Philadelphia Eagles	Clayton Thorson	QB	Northwestern	from LA Rams via Kansas City (Note: Round 5 — No. 167: Kansas City → LA Rams (D). see No. 56: LA Rams → Kansas City.)
5	169	Los Angeles Rams	David Edwards	T	Wisconsin	
6	177	New Orleans Saints	Saquan Hampton	S	Rutgers	from NY Jets (Note: Round 6 — No. 177: NY Jets → New Orleans (PD). See No. 93: New Orleans → NY Jets.)
6	186	Detroit Lions	Ty Johnson	RB	Maryland	from Atlanta
6	196	New York Jets	Blessuan Austin	CB	Rutgers	from Chicago via Oakland (Note: Round 6 — No. 196: multiple trades: –Chicago → Oakland (PD). See No. 24: Chicago → Oakland. –Oakland → NY Jets (PD). See No. 140: Oakland → NY Jets.)
6	197	Baltimore Ravens	Trace McSorley	QB	Penn State	from Philadelphia (Note: Round 6 — No. 197: Philadelphia → Baltimore (D). see No. 22: Baltimore → Philadelphia.)
6	202	Miami Dolphins	Isaiah Prince	T	Ohio State	from New Orleans (Note: Round 6 — No. 202: New Orleans → Miami (D). see No. 48: Miami → New Orleans.)
7	216	Kansas City Chiefs	Nick Allegretti	G	Illinois	from San Francisco (Note: Round 7 — No. 216: San Francisco → Kansas City (PD). San Francisco traded a conditional seventh-round selection to Kansas City in exchange for wide receiver Rod Streater and a conditional seventh-round selection.)
7	218	Dallas Cowboys	Mike Weber	RB	Ohio State	
7	219	Pittsburgh Steelers	Derwin Gray	T	Maryland	from Tampa Bay (Note: Round 7 — No. 219: Tampa Bay → Pittsburgh (PD). Tampa Bay traded a seventh-round selection and free safety J. J. Wilcox to Pittsburgh in exchange for their 2018 sixth-round selection (202nd).)
7	243	Los Angeles Rams	Nick Scott	S	Penn State	from Kansas City via San Francisco and Cleveland (Note: Round 7 — No. 243: multiple trades: –Kansas City → San Francisco (PD). See No. 216: San Francisco → Kansas City. –San Francisco → Cleveland (PD). San Francisco traded this conditional seventh-round selection to Cleveland in exchange for offensive tackle Shon Coleman. –Cleveland → New England (PD). See No. 170: New England → Cleveland.)

== Head coaches ==
Current through games of January 1, 2019

Team	Head coach	Years at school	Overall record	Record at school	B1G record
Illinois	Lovie Smith	3	9–27 (.250)	9–27 (.250)	4–23 (.148)
Indiana	Tom Allen*	2	10–15 (.400)	10–15 (.400)	4–14 (.222)
Iowa	Kirk Ferentz	20	164–122 (.573)	152–101 (.601)	91–72 (.558)
Maryland	D.J. Durkin	3	10–15 (.400)	10–15 (.400)	5–13 (.278)
Maryland	Matt Canada*	1	5–7 (.417)	5–7 (.417)	3–6 (.333)
Michigan	Jim Harbaugh	4	96–41 (.701)	38–14 (.731)	26–9 (.743)
Michigan State	Mark Dantonio	12	125–68 (.648)	107–51 (.677)	66–33 (.667)
Minnesota	P. J. Fleck	2	42–35 (.545)	12–13 (.480)	5–13 (.278)
Nebraska	Scott Frost	1	23–15 (.605)	4–8 (.333)	3–6 (.333)
Northwestern	Pat Fitzgerald	13	96–70 (.578)	96–70 (.578)	56–51 (.523)
Ohio State	Urban Meyer	7	187–32 (.854)	83–9 (.902)	54–4 (.931)
Ohio State	Ryan Day*	2	3–0 (1.000)	3–0 (1.000)	1–0 (1.000)
Penn State	James Franklin	5	69–36 (.657)	45–21 (.682)	27–16 (.628)
Purdue	Jeff Brohm	2	43–23 (.652)	13–13 (.500)	9–9 (.500)
Rutgers	Chris Ash	3	7–29 (.194)	7–29 (.194)	3–25 (.107)
Wisconsin	Paul Chryst	4	61–31 (.663)	42–12 (.778)	27–8 (.771)

* Tom Allen was hired to replace Kevin Wilson in December 2016 at Indiana and coached the Hoosiers in their 2016 bowl game.

* Matt Canada was named interim coach at Maryland after D.J. Durkin was placed on administrative leave by the school. D.J. Durkin was reinstated as head coach at Maryland on October 30, 2018, in time for Maryland's ninth game of the season. A day after his reinstatement, after much negative reaction from multiple stakeholders, Maryland ultimately decided to fire D.J. Durkin.

* Urban Meyer was suspended by Ohio State University for the first three games of the 2018 season due to the mishandling of domestic abuse allegations against one of his former assistant coaches. Ryan Day was named interim head coach in Meyer's absence.
