= 2018 All-Big Ten Conference football team =

American college football all-star team

The 2018 All-Big Ten Conference football team consists of American football players chosen as All-Big Ten Conference players for the 2018 Big Ten Conference football season. The conference recognizes two official All-Big Ten selectors: (1) the Big Ten conference coaches selected separate offensive and defensive units and named first-, second- and third-team players (the "Coaches" team); and (2) a panel of sports writers and broadcasters covering the Big Ten also selected offensive and defensive units and named first-, second- and third-team players (the "Media" team).

== Offensive selections ==
=== Quarterbacks ===
- Dwayne Haskins, Ohio State (Coaches-1; Media-1)
- Trace McSorley, Penn State (Coaches-2; Media-2)
- Shea Patterson, Michigan (Coaches-3)
- David Blough, Purdue (Media-3)

=== Running backs ===
- Karan Higdon, Michigan (Coaches-1; Media-1)
- Jonathan Taylor, Wisconsin (Coaches-1; Media-1)
- Miles Sanders, Penn State (Coaches-2; Media-2)
- Anthony McFarland Jr., Maryland (Coaches-3; Media-2)
- J. K. Dobbins, Ohio State (Coaches-2)
- Reggie Corbin, Illinois (Coaches-3; Media-3)

=== Wide receivers ===
- Rondale Moore, Purdue (Coaches-1; Media-1)
- Parris Campbell, Ohio State (Coaches-1; Media-2)
- Tyler Johnson, Minnesota (Coaches-2; Media-1)
- Stanley Morgan Jr., Nebraska (Coaches-2; Media-2)
- J. D. Spielman, Nebraska (Coaches-3; Media-3)
- K. J. Hill, Ohio State (Media-3)
- Donovan Peoples-Jones, Michigan (Coaches-3)

=== Centers ===
- Tyler Biadasz, Wisconsin (Coaches-1; Media-1)
- Michael Jordan, Ohio State (Coaches-2; Media-2)
- Cesar Ruiz, Michigan (Coaches-3)
- Keegan Render, Iowa (Media-3)

=== Guards ===
- Beau Benzschawel, Wisconsin (Coaches-1; Media-1)
- Michael Deiter, Wisconsin (Coaches-1; Media-1)
- Ben Bredeson, Michigan (Coaches-2; Media-2)
- Ross Reynolds, Iowa (Coaches-2; Media-3)
- Connor McGovern, Penn State (Coaches-3; Media-3)
- Nick Allegretti, Illinois (Media-2)
- Demetrius Knox, Ohio State (Media-3)
- Michael Onwenu, Michigan (Coaches-3)

=== Tackles ===
- Isaiah Prince, Ohio State (Coaches-1; Media-1)
- David Edwards, Wisconsin (Coaches-2; Media-1)
- Jon Runyan Jr., Michigan (Coaches-1; Media-2)
- Alaric Jackson, Iowa (Coaches-2; Media-2)
- Ryan Bates, Penn State (Coaches-3; Media-3)
- Damian Prince, Maryland (Media-3)
- Rashawn Slater, Northwestern (Coaches-3)

=== Tight ends ===
- Noah Fant, Iowa (Coaches-1; Media-2)
- T. J. Hockenson, Iowa (Coaches-2; Media-1)
- Zach Gentry, Michigan (Coaches-3)
- Brycen Hopkins, Purdue (Media-3)

== Defensive selections ==
=== Defensive linemen ===
- Chase Winovich, Michigan (Coaches-1; Media-1)
- Kenny Willekes, Michigan State (Coaches-1; Media-1)
- Rashan Gary, Michigan (Coaches-1; Media-2)
- Dre'Mont Jones, Ohio State (Coaches-1; Media-2)
- A. J. Epenesa, Iowa (Coaches-2; Media-1)
- Yetur Gross-Matos, Penn State (Coaches-3; Media-1)
- Carter Coughlin, Minnesota (Coaches-2; Media-2)
- Joe Gaziano, Northwestern (Coaches-2; Media-3)
- Anthony Nelson, Iowa (Coaches-3; Media-2)
- Chase Young, Ohio State (Coaches-2; Media-3)
- Shareef Miller, Penn State (Coaches-3; Media-3)
- Raequan Williams, Michigan State (Coaches-3; Media-3)

=== Linebackers ===
- Devin Bush, Michigan (Coaches-1; Media-1)
- Joe Bachie, Michigan State (Coaches-1; Media-2)
- T. J. Edwards, Wisconsin (Coaches-2; Media-1)
- Paddy Fisher, Northwestern (Coaches-1; Media-2)
- Tre Watson, Maryland (Coaches-2; Media-1)
- Markus Bailey, Purdue (Coaches-2; Media-3)
- Blake Cashman, Minnesota (Coaches-3; Media-2)
- Mohamed Barry, Nebraska (Media-3)
- Ryan Connelly, Wisconsin (Coaches-3)
- Blake Gallagher, Northwestern (Media-3)
- Andrew Van Ginkel, Wisconsin (Coaches-3)

=== Defensive backs ===
- Amani Hooker, Iowa (Coaches-1; Media-1)
- Lavert Hill, Michigan (Coaches-1; Media-1)
- Amani Oruwariye, Penn State (Coaches-1; Media-1)
- Montre Hartage, Northwestern (Coaches-3; Media-1)
- David Long, Michigan (Coaches-1; Media-3)
- Justin Layne, Michigan State (Coaches-2; Media-2)
- Josh Metellus, Michigan (Coaches-2; Media-2)
- Darnell Savage, Maryland (Coaches-2; Media-2)
- Antoine Brooks, Maryland (Coaches-2)
- Jordan Fuller, Ohio State (Media-2)
- Dicaprio Bootle, Nebraska (Coaches-3; Media-3)
- D'Cota Dixon, Wisconsin (Coaches-3; Media-3)
- David Dowell, Michigan State (Coaches-3)
- Khari Willis, Michigan State (Media-3)

== Special teams ==
=== Kickers ===
- Matt Coghlin, Michigan State (Coaches-3; Media-1)
- Chase McLaughlin, Illinois (Coaches-1; Media-2)
- Logan Justus, Indiana (Coaches-2; Media-3)

=== Punters ===
- Will Hart, Michigan (Coaches-1; Media-1)
- Drue Chrisman, Ohio State (Coaches-2; Media-2)
- Blake Hayes, Illinois (Media-3)
- Joe Schopper, Purdue (Coaches-3)

=== Return specialist ===
- Rondale Moore, Purdue (Coaches-1; Media-2)
- Ihmir Smith-Marsette, Iowa (Coaches-2; Media-1)
- Donovan Peoples-Jones, Michigan (Coaches-3; Media-3)

== Key ==
Bold = Consensus first-team selection by both the coaches and media

Coaches = Selected by the Big Ten Conference coaches

Media = Selected by the conference media

== See also ==
- 2018 College Football All-America Team
