= Derwin Gray =

Derwin Gray may refer to:

- Derwin Gray (defensive back) (born 1971), American football safety who went on to become a pastor and author
- Derwin Gray (offensive lineman) (born 1995), American football offensive tackle
