= David Long (defensive back) =

American football player (born 1998)

David Long Jr.
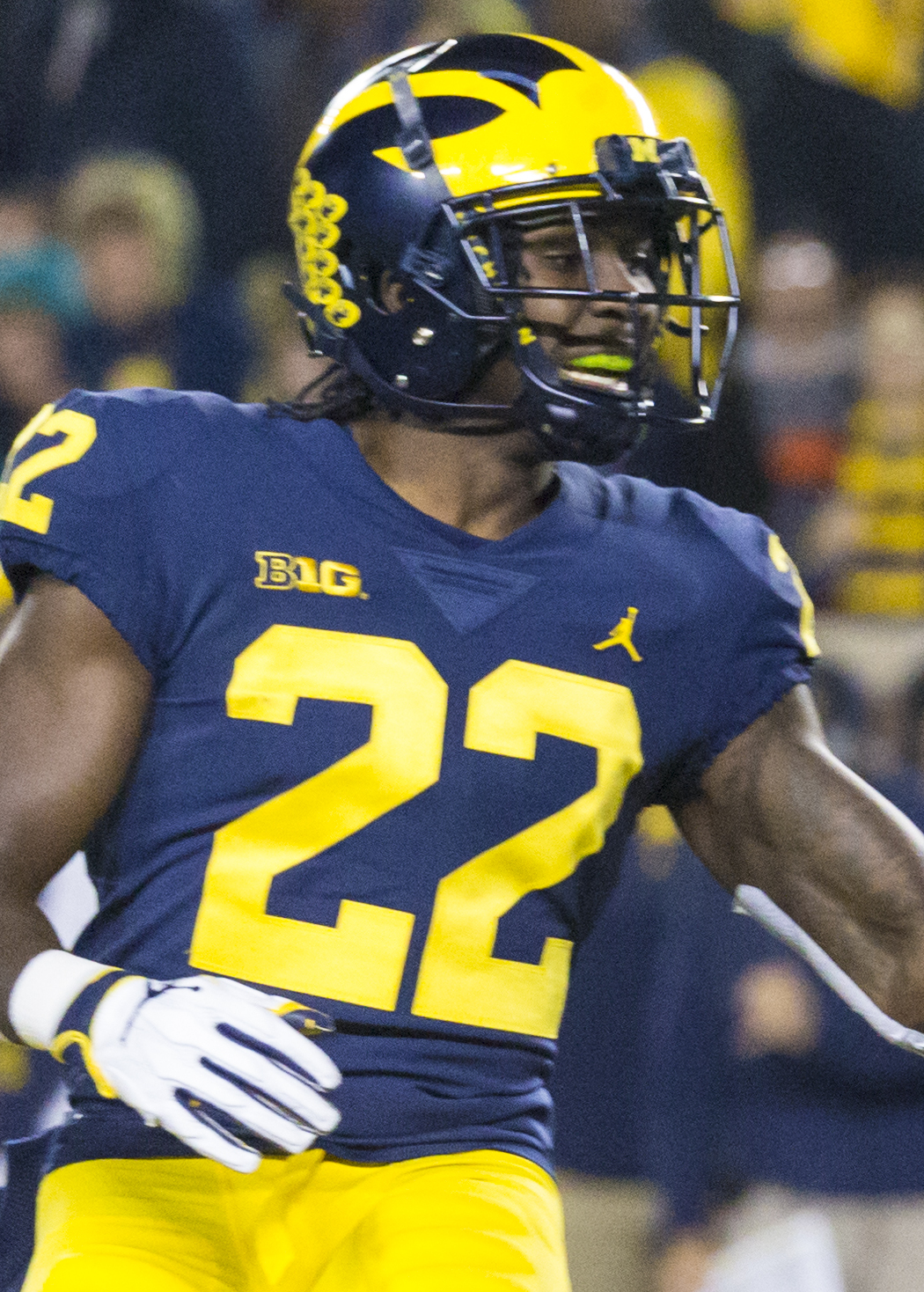
- Long with the Michigan Wolverines in 2018

No. 27 – Los Angeles Rams
- Position: Cornerback
- Roster status: Practice squad

Personal information
- Born: February 6, 1998 (age 28); Los Angeles, California, U.S.
- Listed height: 5 ft 11 in (1.80 m)
- Listed weight: 196 lb (89 kg)

Career information
- High school: Loyola (Los Angeles, California)
- College: Michigan (2016–2018)
- NFL draft: 2019: 3rd round, 79th overall pick

Career history
- Los Angeles Rams (2019–2022); Las Vegas Raiders (2023); Carolina Panthers (2023); Green Bay Packers (2023); New York Giants (2024)*; Indianapolis Colts (2024–2025); Carolina Panthers (2025)*; New York Giants (2026)*; New Orleans Saints (2026); Los Angeles Rams (2026–present)*
- * Offseason or practice squad member only

Awards and highlights
- Super Bowl champion (LVI); First-team All-Big Ten (2018)

Career NFL statistics
- Total tackles: 96
- Pass deflections: 8
- Interceptions: 1
- Stats at Pro Football Reference

David Long Jr. (born February 6, 1998) is an American professional football cornerback for the Los Angeles Rams of the National Football League (NFL). He played college football for the Michigan Wolverines and was selected by the Los Angeles Rams in the third round of the 2019 NFL draft. As a junior he was an All-Big Ten Conference selection. He is known for his nickname as "the Hawk".

== Early life ==
A native of Pasadena, Long attended Bishop Alemany High School his freshman year, before transferring to Loyola High School for the remainder of his high school career.

In July 2015, the Chicago Tribune reported that Long was considering local schools USC and UCLA as well as Michigan, Notre Dame, Wisconsin, Washington, Oregon, Stanford, Duke and Oklahoma for his collegiate football career. On August 2, 2015, Long was described as wavering between Stanford and Washington, but committed to Stanford on August 6.

Long, a 4.0 grade point average (GPA) student, became the first player to receive his jersey for the 2016 U.S. Army All-American Bowl on September 22, 2015. He decommitted from Stanford on December 18, and announced he was considering Washington and Michigan. He played in the U.S. Army All-American Bowl and was described as starting to lean toward Michigan by that time. Michigan head coach Jim Harbaugh flew with four assistant coaches on January 18 and climbed a tree as part of his effort to recruit Long. Long committed to Michigan on January 21, 2016.

== College career ==
Long graduated from high school with a 3.9 GPA and arrived at Michigan to be mentored by Jourdan Lewis. As a junior for the 2018 Michigan Wolverines, he was a 2018 All-Big Ten Conference first-team (coaches) and third-team (media) selection. Following the season, he was considered to be a possible 2019 NFL draft prospect.

== Professional career ==
Pre-draft measurables
Height	Weight	Arm length	Hand span	Wingspan	40-yard dash	10-yard split	20-yard split	20-yard shuttle	Three-cone drill	Vertical jump	Broad jump	Bench press
5 ft 10 5/8 in (1.79 m)	196 lb (89 kg)	30 7/8 in (0.78 m)	9 5/8 in (0.24 m)	6 ft 4 1/8 in (1.93 m)	4.45 s	1.57 s	2.62 s	3.97 s	6.45 s	39.5 in (1.00 m)	10 ft 0 in (3.05 m)	15 reps
All values from NFL Combine

=== Los Angeles Rams (first stint) ===
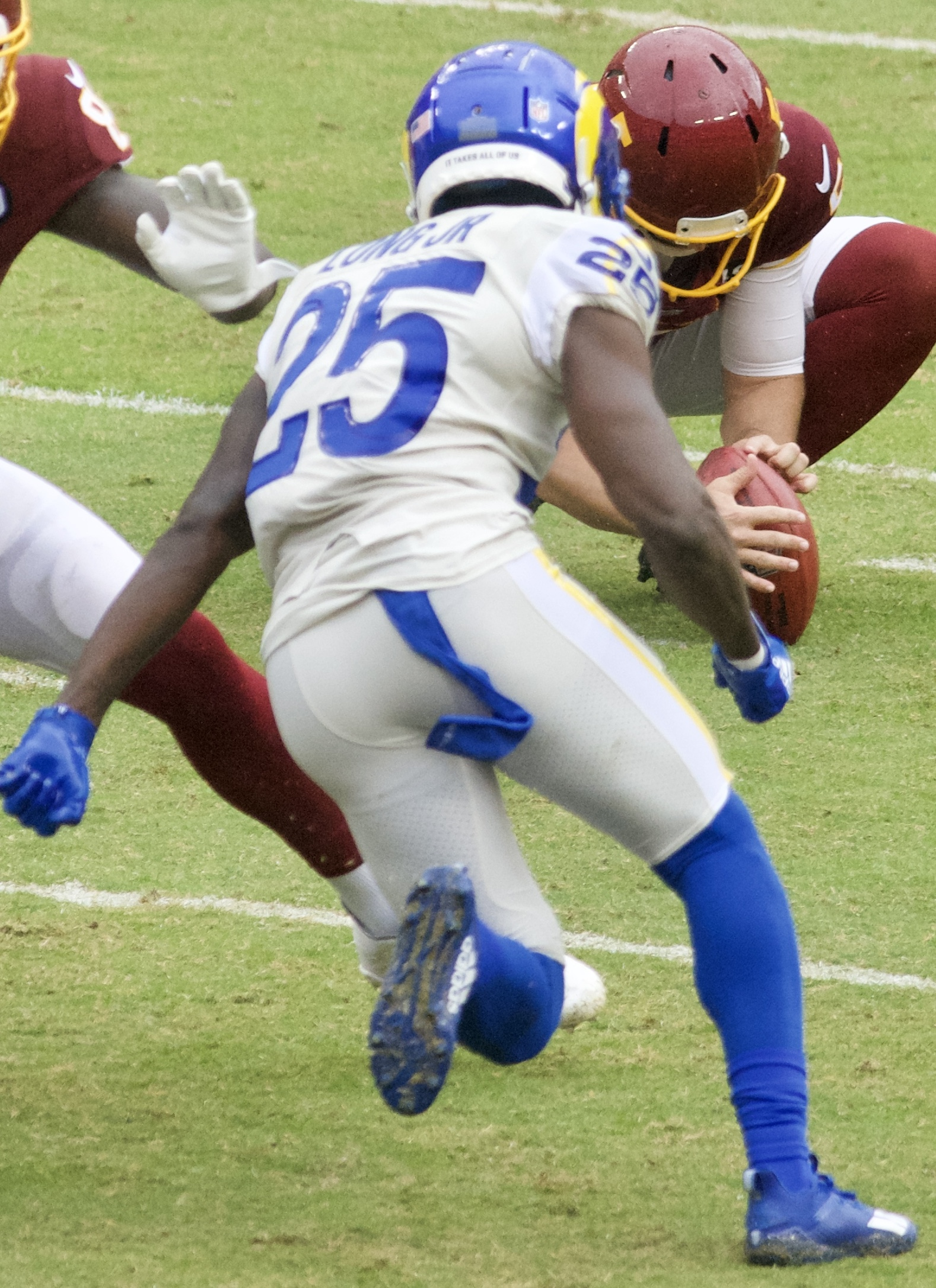
Long with the Los Angeles Rams in 2020

The Los Angeles Rams selected Long in the third round (79th overall) in the 2019 NFL Draft. In Super Bowl LVI, Long recorded four tackles in the 23–20 win against the Cincinnati Bengals.

=== Las Vegas Raiders ===
On March 22, 2023, Long signed with the Las Vegas Raiders. Long was released by the Raiders on November 2.

=== Carolina Panthers ===
On November 3, 2023, Long was claimed off waivers by the Carolina Panthers. He was released on December 1.

=== Green Bay Packers ===
On December 5, 2023, Long was claimed off waivers by the Green Bay Packers. He was released on January 6, 2024. On January 12, he was signed to the practice squad and elevated for the first round game of the 2023–24 NFL playoffs a day later. He was not signed to a reserve/future contract after the season and thus became a free agent when his practice squad contract expired.

=== New York Giants ===
On May 1, 2024, Long signed with the New York Giants. He was released on August 27.

=== Indianapolis Colts ===
On September 2, 2024, Long was signed to the Indianapolis Colts practice squad. The Colts signed him to the active roster on October 8.

On July 31, 2025, the Colts placed Long on injured reserve. He was released on August 3. He was re-signed to the practice squad on October 20. The Colts released Long on November 4.

=== Carolina Panthers (second stint) ===
On November 26, 2025, the Carolina Panthers signed Long to their practice squad.

=== New York Giants (second stint) ===
On August 5, 2026, the New York Giants signed Long. He was released by the Giants on August 13.

=== New Orleans Saints ===
On August 26, 2026, the New Orleans Saints signed Long. On August 30, Long was placed on season ending injured-reserve. On October 29, he was released with an injury settlement.

=== Los Angeles Rams (second stint) ===
On November 5, 2026, Long signed with the Los Angeles Rams practice squad.

== NFL career statistics ==
=== Regular season ===
Year	Team	Games		Tackles				Interceptions						Fumbles	
Year	Team	GP	GS	Comb	Total	Ast	Sck	PD	Int	Yds	Avg	Lng	TDs	FF	FR
2019	LAR	8	0	9	8	1	0.0	2	0	0	0	0	0	0	0
2020	LAR	16	1	7	6	1	0.0	0	0	0	0	0	0	0	0
2021	LAR	16	5	40	35	5	0.0	4	1	0	0	0	0	0	0
2022	LAR	12	4	21	18	3	0.0	1	0	0	0	0	0	0	0
2023	CAR	3	1	7	5	2	0.0	0	0	0	0.0	0	0	0	0
2023	GB	3	0	0	0	0	0.0	0	0	0	0.0	0	0	0	0
2023	LVR	8	1	12	10	2	0.0	1	0	0	0.0	0	0	0	0
2024	IND	13	0	0	0	0	0.0	0	0	0	0.0	0	0	0	0
Career		79	12	96	82	14	0.0	8	1	0	0.0	0	0	0	0
Source: pro-football-referencecom

=== Postseason ===
Year	Team	Games		Tackles				Interceptions						Fumbles	
Year	Team	GP	GS	Comb	Total	Ast	Sck	PD	Int	Yds	Avg	Lng	TDs	FF	FR
2020	LAR	2	0	0	0	0	0.0	0	0	0	0.0	0	0	0	0
2021	LAR	4	1	12	11	1	0.0	1	1	3	3.0	3	1	0	0
Career		6	0	12	11	1	0.0	1	1	3	3.0	3	1	0	0
Source: pro-football-referencecom
