= T. J. Hockenson =

American football player (born 1997)

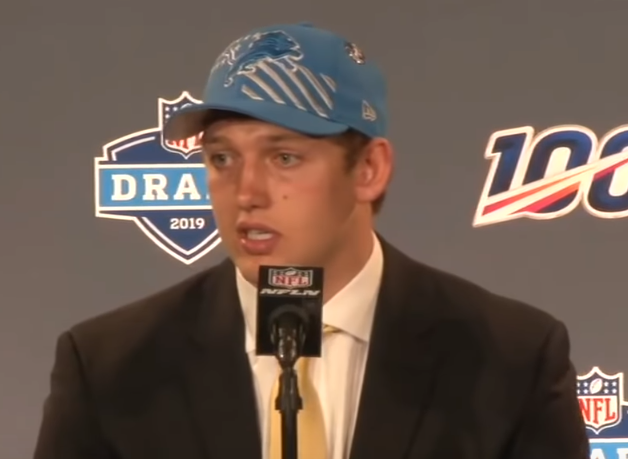
- Hockenson in 2019

No. 87 – Minnesota Vikings
- Position: Tight end
- Roster status: Active

Personal information
- Born: July 3, 1997 (age 29); Des Moines, Iowa, U.S.
- Listed height: 6 ft 5 in (1.96 m)
- Listed weight: 248 lb (112 kg)

Career information
- High school: Chariton (Chariton, Iowa)
- College: Iowa (2016–2018)
- NFL draft: 2019: 1st round, 8th overall pick

Career history
- Detroit Lions (2019–2022); Minnesota Vikings (2022–present)

Awards and highlights
- 2× Pro Bowl (2020, 2022); John Mackey Award (2018); Ozzie Newsome Award (2018); First-team All-American (2018); Big Ten Tight End of the Year (2018); First-team All-Big Ten (2018)

Career NFL statistics as of Week 10, 2026
- Receptions: 468
- Receiving yards: 4,768
- Receiving touchdowns: 29
- Stats at Pro Football Reference

Thomas James Hockenson (born July 3, 1997) is an American professional football tight end for the Minnesota Vikings of the National Football League (NFL). He played college football for the Iowa Hawkeyes, where he earned the John Mackey Award, as the nation's top tight end in college football. Hockenson was selected in the first round (eighth overall) of the 2019 NFL draft by the Detroit Lions.

== Early life ==
Hockenson grew up in Cherokee, Iowa and moved to Chariton, Iowa in his teenage years, where he attended Chariton High School and played football and basketball. Hockenson was a four-year letter winner as a tight end and defensive back and set school records for receiving yards in a game, season, and career. He led his team to the state playoffs as a senior and was named all-state first team that year. Hockenson was rated as a three-star recruit and the seventh-highest rated recruit in the state of Iowa in the class of 2016 by the 247Sports.com Composite, which aggregates the ratings of the major football recruiting services. He committed to the Iowa Hawkeyes on June 20, 2015.

== College career ==
Hockenson redshirted his true freshman year in 2016. He was one of two tight ends in the starting lineup in Iowa's 2017 opener against Wyoming, along with Noah Fant. Hockenson recorded his first career receptions the next week against Iowa State, finishing with two catches for 41 yards in the game. He had his best game of the year in Iowa's upset victory over then-No. 3 Ohio State, where Hockenson led the team with five receptions for 71 yards and two touchdowns. He ultimately finished fifth on the team on the year with 24 receptions for 320 yards and three receiving touchdowns.

Hockenson was listed on the preseason watch list for the John Mackey Award going into the 2018 season, as was teammate Noah Fant. In an early season loss to rival Wisconsin, Hockenson set a career high with 125 receiving yards, including a 46-yard connection from quarterback Nate Stanley. He again eclipsed the 100-yard mark in an October 13 game against Indiana, where Hockenson recorded four receptions for 107 yards and two touchdowns. He ultimately finished the season with 46 receptions for 717 yards and six touchdowns, leading the Hawkeyes in the first two categories and finishing one receiving touchdown behind Fant for the team lead. Hockenson was named first-team All-Big Ten Conference at tight end by the media voters, and second-team behind Fant by the coaches. Hockenson also won the Big Ten's tight end of the year award, the Kwalick–Clark Award. Hockenson was awarded the John Mackey Award, honoring him as the top tight end in college football in 2018. Hockenson is the second Hawkeye to receive the award, after Dallas Clark in 2002, and the first sophomore.

On January 14, 2019, Hockenson announced via Twitter that he would be leaving school early to declare for the 2019 NFL draft.

== Professional career ==
Pre-draft measurables
Height	Weight	Arm length	Hand span	Wingspan	40-yard dash	10-yard split	20-yard split	20-yard shuttle	Three-cone drill	Vertical jump	Broad jump	Bench press
6 ft 4 3/4 in (1.95 m)	251 lb (114 kg)	32 1/4 in (0.82 m)	9 1/2 in (0.24 m)	6 ft 5 7/8 in (1.98 m)	4.70 s	1.64 s	2.75 s	4.18 s	7.02 s	37.5 in (0.95 m)	10 ft 3 in (3.12 m)	17 reps
All values from NFL Combine

=== Detroit Lions ===
==== 2019 season ====
Hockenson was selected by the Detroit Lions in the first round as the eighth overall pick in the 2019 NFL draft. On May 9, 2019, he signed a four-year deal with the Lions worth $19.8 million.

Hockenson made his regular season debut on September 8, 2019, against the Arizona Cardinals. He finished the game with six receptions for 131 yards and a touchdown as the game ended in a 27–27 tie. Hockenson's 131 yards set an NFL record for the most by a tight end in a debut. Three weeks later against the Kansas City Chiefs, he caught three passes for 27 yards and a touchdown before exiting the game with a concussion. Without Hockenson, the Lions lost 34–30. He was placed on injured reserve on December 2, 2019.

Hockenson finished his rookie year with 32 receptions for 367 yards and two touchdowns in 12 games and seven starts.

==== 2020 season ====
Hockenson was placed on the reserve/COVID-19 list by the Lions on July 29, 2020, and was activated 10 days later. He made his return from injury in Week 1 against the Chicago Bears. Hockenson caught five passes for 56 yards and his first touchdown of the season as the Lions lost 27–23. During a Week 7 matchup against the Atlanta Falcons, Hockenson caught the game-winning touchdown pass from Matthew Stafford as time expired, giving the Lions their third victory of the season. On December 21, 2020, Hockenson was named to the 2021 Pro Bowl.

Hockenson finished his second season with 67 receptions for 723 yards and six touchdowns in 16 games and starts. He was ranked 93rd by his fellow players on the NFL Top 100 Players of 2021.

==== 2021 season ====
Hockenson entered the 2021 season as the Lions starting tight end. He was placed on injured reserve on December 17, 2021, after undergoing thumb surgery. Hockenson finished the 2021 season with 61 catches for 583 yards and four touchdowns in 12 games and starts.

==== 2022 season ====
The Lions picked up the fifth-year option on Hockenson's contract on April 26, 2022. During Week 4 against the Seattle Seahawks, Hockenson set the all-time Lions record for receiving yards in a game by a tight end, gaining 179 yards on eight receptions in the 48–45 loss. This broke the record of 161 yards set by Jim Gibbons (Another former Iowa Hawkeye) on December 13, 1964.

=== Minnesota Vikings ===
==== 2022 season ====
On November 1, 2022, the Lions traded Hockenson along with a 2023 fourth-round draft pick and a conditional 2024 fourth-round draft pick (fifth if the Vikings had won a playoff game in 2022; but they lost to the New York Giants in the Wild Card) to the Minnesota Vikings in exchange for a 2023 second-round pick and a 2024 third-round draft pick. Hockenson finished the 2022 season with 86 receptions for 914 yards and six touchdowns over his time with the Lions and Vikings. He earned Pro Bowl honors for the second time.

==== 2023 season ====
On August 31, 2023, Hockenson signed a four-year, $63.5 million contract extension with the Vikings.

On December 27, 2023, Hockenson was placed on the injured reserve list after suffering a torn ACL and MCL in a Week 16 game against the Lions the previous Sunday. He finished the 2023 season with 95 receptions for 960 yards and five touchdowns in 15 games and 11 starts.

==== 2024 season ====
Hockenson was placed on the reserve/physically unable to perform (PUP) list to begin the 2024 season, sidelining him for the first four games. Hockenson was activated on October 25. He finished the 2024 season with 41 receptions for 455 yards. He scored a receiving touchdown in the Vikings' Wild Card Round loss to the Rams.

==== 2025 season ====
Hockenson finished the 2025 season with 51 receptions for 438 yards and three touchdowns.

== Career statistics ==
=== NFL ===
==== Regular season ====
Year	Team	Games		Receiving					Fumbles	
Year	Team	GP	GS	Rec	Yds	Avg	Lng	TD	Fum	Lost
2019	DET	12	7	32	367	11.5	39	2	0	0
2020	DET	16	16	67	723	10.8	51	6	1	1
2021	DET	12	12	61	583	9.6	33	4	0	0
2022	DET	7	7	26	395	15.2	81	3	0	0
2022	MIN	10	7	60	519	8.7	21	3	1	1
2023	MIN	15	11	95	960	10.1	29	5	1	1
2024	MIN	10	9	41	455	11.1	34	0	0	0
2025	MIN	15	15	51	438	8.6	29	3	0	0
2026	MIN	8	7	35	328	9.4	22	3	0	0
Career		105	91	468	4,768	10.2	81	29	3	3

==== Postseason ====
Year	Team	Games		Receiving					Fumbles	
Year	Team	GP	GS	Rec	Yds	Avg	Lng	TD	Fum	Lost
2022	MIN	1	1	10	129	12.9	28	0	0	0
2024	MIN	1	0	5	64	12.8	26	1	0	0
Career		2	1	15	193	12.9	28	1	0	0

=== College ===
Season	Team	Receiving				Rushing			
Season	Team	Rec	Yds	Avg	TD	Att	Yds	Avg	TD
2016	Iowa	Redshirt							
2017	Iowa	24	320	13.3	3	0	0	0.0	0
2018	Iowa	46	717	15.6	6	1	4	4.0	1
Totals		70	1,037	14.8	9	1	4	4.0	1
