= David Edwards (offensive lineman) =

American football player (born 1997)

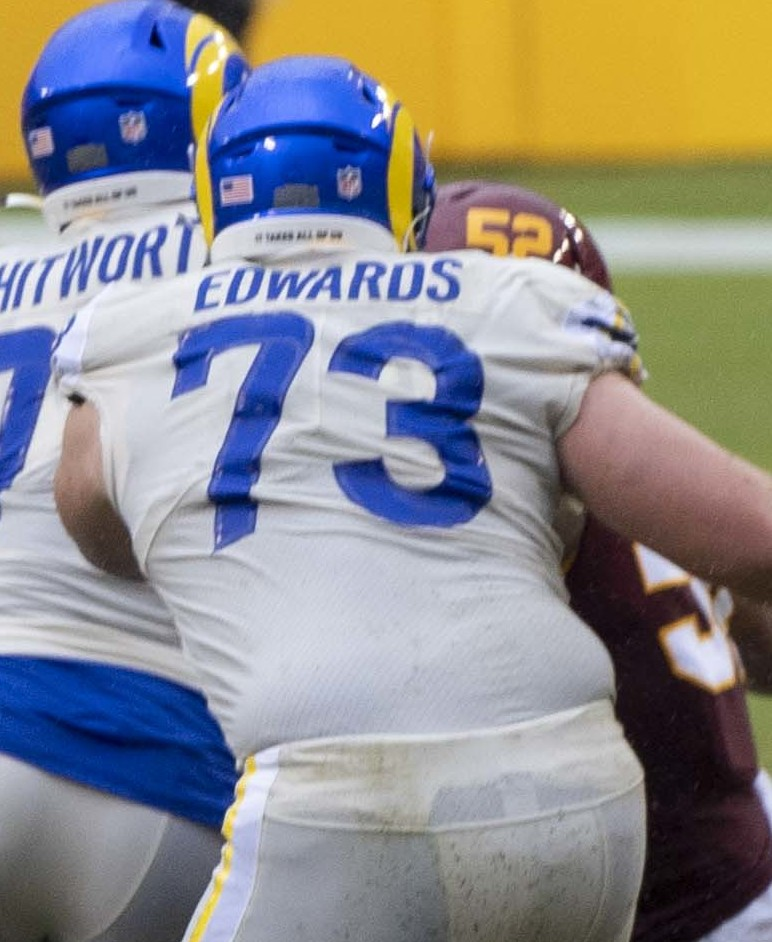
- Edwards with the Los Angeles Rams in 2020

No. 76 – New Orleans Saints
- Position: Guard
- Roster status: Active

Personal information
- Born: March 20, 1997 (age 29); Downers Grove, Illinois, U.S.
- Listed height: 6 ft 6 in (1.98 m)
- Listed weight: 308 lb (140 kg)

Career information
- High school: Downers Grove North
- College: Wisconsin (2015–2018)
- NFL draft: 2019: 5th round, 169th overall pick

Career history
- Los Angeles Rams (2019–2022); Buffalo Bills (2023–2025); New Orleans Saints (2026–present)

Awards and highlights
- Super Bowl champion (LVI); First-team All-American (2017); 2× Second-team All-Big Ten (2017, 2018)

Career NFL statistics as of Week 10, 2026
- Games played: 112
- Games started: 86
- Stats at Pro Football Reference

David Edwards (born March 20, 1997) is an American professional football guard for the New Orleans Saints of the National Football League (NFL). He has previously played in the NFL for the Los Angeles Rams, with whom he won Super Bowl LVI, and the Buffalo Bills. He played college football for the Wisconsin Badgers.

== Early life ==
During high school, Edwards played quarterback for the Downers Grove North High School Trojans. While in high school, he weighed 215 pounds, didn't lift weights, and didn't eat breakfast.

Edwards was also a standout basketball player for the Trojans, starting at center for three years on the varsity level. Edwards gained the attention of numerous collegiate scouts, most notably from the University of Illinois and various Ivy League schools.

== College career ==
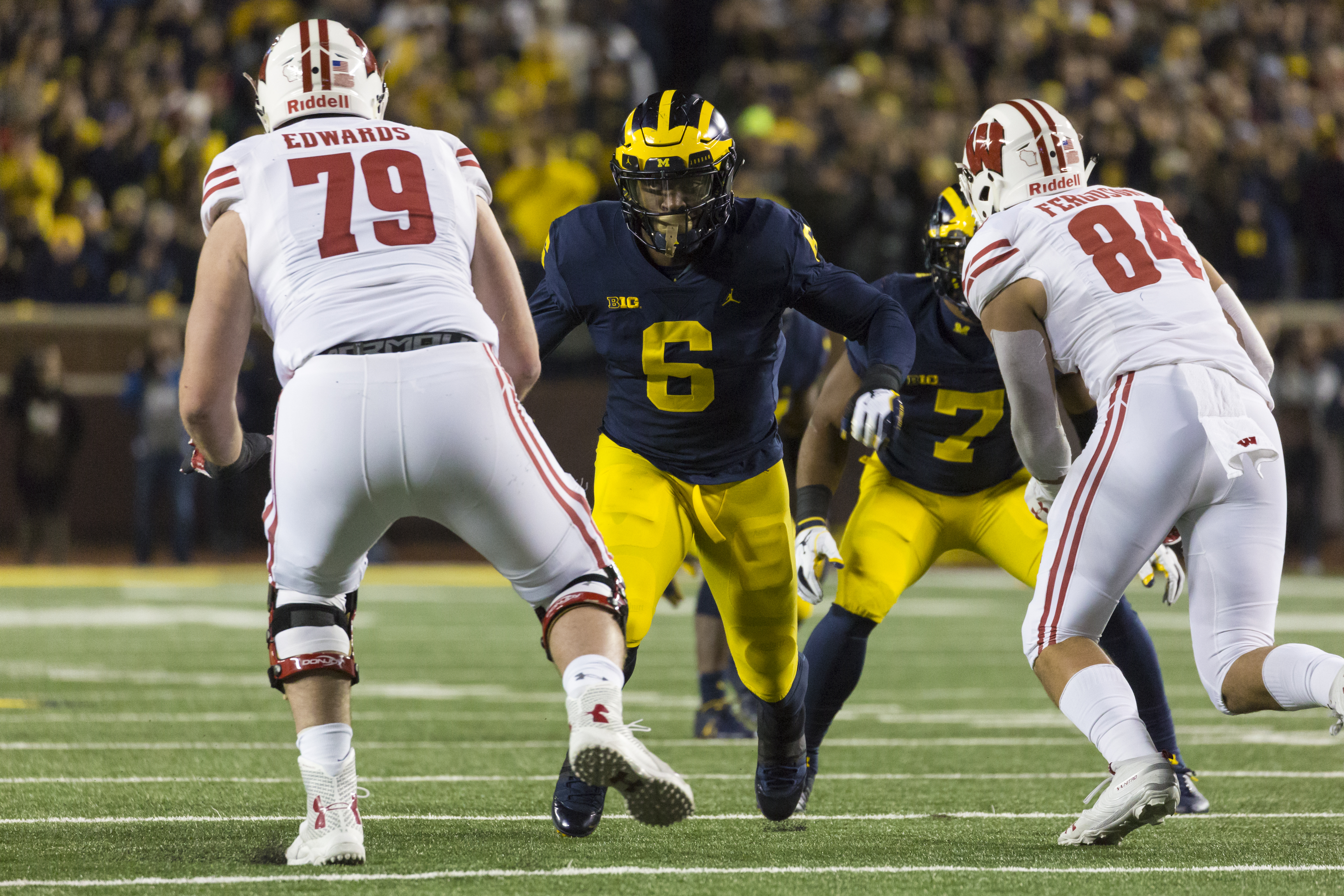
Edwards with the Wisconsin in 2018 playing against Michigan on October 13

Edwards committed to the Wisconsin Badgers in June 2014 and was initially considered to be a tight end. He was red-shirted for the 2015 season and made his first start in October of the 2016 season, playing right tackle for the Badgers.

During college, Edwards started eating breakfast and gained 20 pounds in his first six months. By August 2016, Edwards had grown to 275 pounds. He gained 60 pounds between high school and his first game for the Badgers.

After his Sophomore season, Edwards was named an American Football Coaches Association First-team All-American. Edwards considered declaring for the 2018 NFL draft, but eventually decided against it. One factor that swayed Edwards was a talk with Wisconsin alumnus and Cleveland Browns player Joe Thomas, who told Edwards that he would remember his final year at Wisconsin more than his rookie season in the NFL.

Prior to the 2018 season, Edwards was named pre-season second-team All-American by Sporting News, Sports Illustrated, and the Associated Press. Edwards was also named a first-team All-American by Athlon Sports.

On January 1, 2019, Edwards announced that he would forgo his final year of eligibility and declare for the 2019 NFL draft.

== Professional career ==
Pre-draft measurables
Height	Weight	Arm length	Hand span	Wingspan	40-yard dash	10-yard split	20-yard split	20-yard shuttle	Three-cone drill	Vertical jump	Broad jump	Bench press
6 ft 6 1/4 in (1.99 m)	308 lb (140 kg)	33 3/8 in (0.85 m)	9 3/4 in (0.25 m)	6 ft 8 1/8 in (2.04 m)	5.28 s	1.80 s	3.05 s	4.77 s	7.69 s	25.5 in (0.65 m)	8 ft 3 in (2.51 m)	16 reps
All values from NFL Combine/Pro Day

=== Los Angeles Rams ===
Edwards was selected by the Los Angeles Rams in the fifth round (169th overall) of the 2019 NFL Draft. Edwards started in Super Bowl LVI and the Rams went on to defeat the Cincinnati Bengals 23–20.

Edwards returned as the starting left guard to start the 2022 season. On October 11, 2022, Edwards was placed on injured reserve with a concussion. He was designated to return from injured reserve on November 16.

=== Buffalo Bills ===
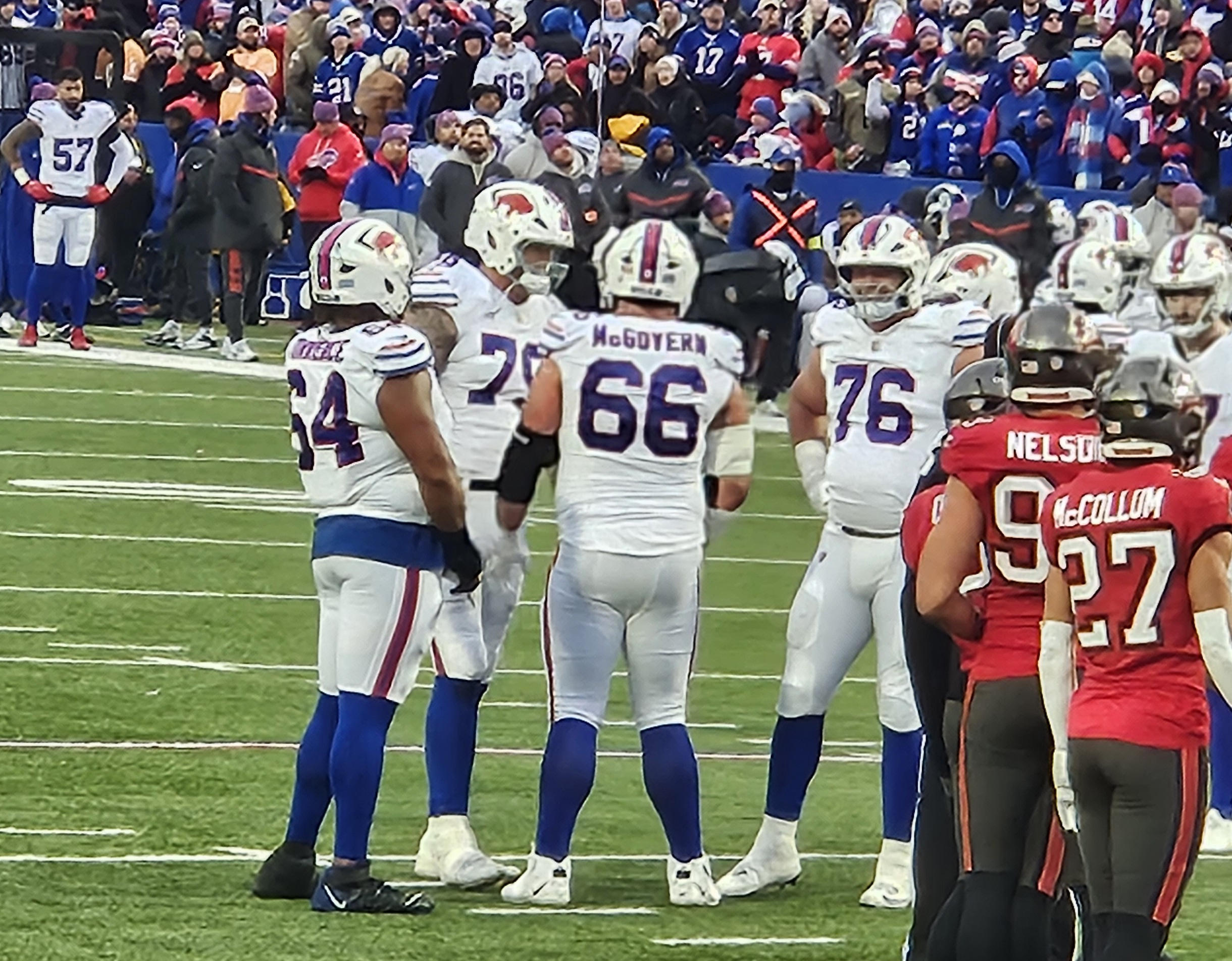
Edwards (#76) and his Bills teammates against the Tampa Bay Buccaneers in 2025

On March 23, 2023, Edwards signed a one-year contract with the Buffalo Bills.

Edwards signed a two-year, $6 million extension with the Bills on March 6, 2024.

=== New Orleans Saints ===
On March 11, 2026, Edwards signed a four-year, $61 million contract with the New Orleans Saints.
