= Amani Oruwariye =

American football player (born 1996)

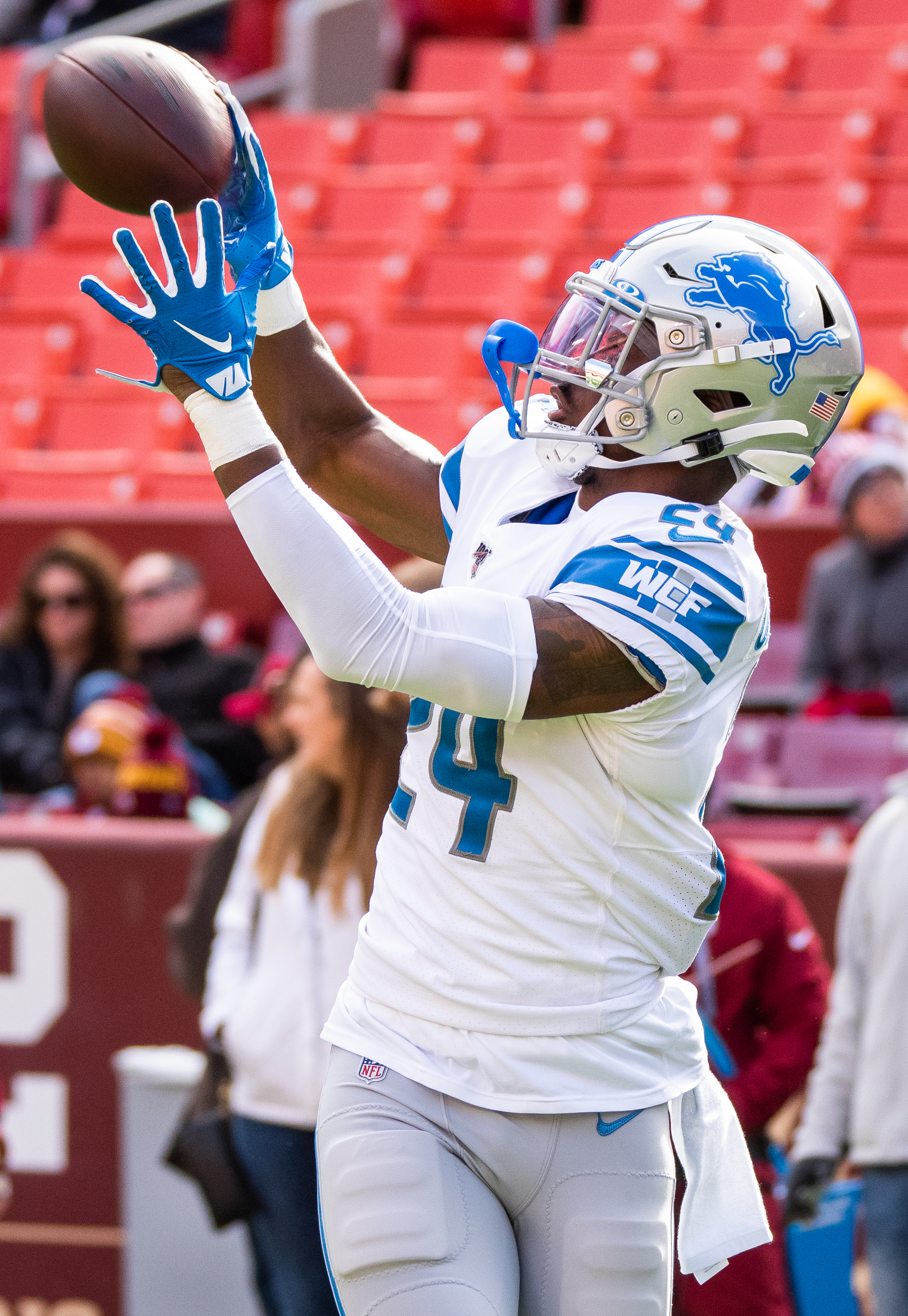
- Oruwariye in 2019

No. 28 – Baltimore Ravens
- Position: Cornerback
- Roster status: Practice squad

Personal information
- Born: February 9, 1996 (age 30); St. Petersburg, Florida, U.S.
- Listed height: 6 ft 2 in (1.88 m)
- Listed weight: 198 lb (90 kg)

Career information
- High school: Gaither (Tampa, Florida)
- College: Penn State (2014–2018)
- NFL draft: 2019: 5th round, 146th overall pick

Career history
- Detroit Lions (2019–2022); New York Giants (2023)*; Jacksonville Jaguars (2023); Dallas Cowboys (2024); Tennessee Titans (2025)*; Baltimore Ravens (2025–present)
- * Offseason or practice squad member only

Awards and highlights
- First-team All-Big Ten (2018); Second-team All-Big Ten (2017)

Career NFL statistics as of 2025
- Total tackles: 203
- Pass deflections: 27
- Interceptions: 10
- Fumble recoveries: 2
- Stats at Pro Football Reference

Amani Horatio Oruwariye (/ɔːruˈwɑːriˌjeɪ/ or-oo-WAR-ee-YAY; born February 9, 1996) is an American professional football cornerback for the Baltimore Ravens of the National Football League (NFL). He played college football at Penn State.

== Early life ==
Oruwariye lettered for three years at Gaither High School in Tampa, Florida. As a senior, he was voted team MVP and invited to the Hillsborough County All-Star Game. He was ranked a three star recruit by all four major recruiting services, and 247Sports and Rivals rated him a top 100 prospect in the state of Florida. Oruwariye committed to Vanderbilt University early in his senior year before decommitting and following Head Coach James Franklin to Penn State.

College recruiting
Name	Hometown	School	Height	Weight	Commit date
Amani Oruwariye; CB	Tampa, FL	Tampa (FL) Gaither	6 ft 1 in (1.85 m)	180 lb (82 kg)	Jan 30, 2014
Amani Oruwariye; CB	Recruit ratings: Scout: Rivals: 247Sports: (73)				
Overall recruit ranking:
Note: In many cases, Scout, Rivals, 247Sports, On3, and ESPN may conflict in their listings of height and weight.; In these cases, the average was taken. ESPN grades are on a 100-point scale.; Sources: "2014 Team Ranking". Rivals.com.

== College career ==
Oruwariye redshirted his true freshman season at Penn State, then appeared in mostly special teams action during his redshirt freshman year.

In 2016, Oruwariye saw more time en route to Penn State's first Big Ten Championship Game victory. He logged his first interception against Kent State, which he proceeded to return for a touchdown. He finished the season with 23 total tackles.

Oruwariye burst onto the national scene in 2017 due to his personal-best four interceptions, good for fourth in the Big Ten. He earned recognition from both coaches and the media, who elected him second all-B1G. He appeared in all but one game as Penn State clinched its first Fiesta Bowl victory since 1997.

Oruwariye carried his junior year momentum into his redshirt senior year, starting in each of Penn State's 12 games, picking off three passes, and tallying a career highs in tackles, pass defenses, and forced fumbles. His excellence was recognized by coaches, media, the Associated Press, and ESPN, all of whom named him to their All-B1G teams. He received an invite to the Reese's Senior Bowl amidst discussions that he could potentially be a first round pick.

== Professional career ==
Pre-draft measurables
Height	Weight	Arm length	Hand span	Wingspan	40-yard dash	10-yard split	20-yard split	20-yard shuttle	Three-cone drill	Vertical jump	Broad jump	Bench press
6 ft 1 5/8 in (1.87 m)	205 lb (93 kg)	31 3/8 in (0.80 m)	9 in (0.23 m)	6 ft 3 1/4 in (1.91 m)	4.47 s	1.56 s	2.66 s	4.16 s	6.82 s	36.5 in (0.93 m)	10 ft 0 in (3.05 m)	17 reps
All values from NFL Combine

=== Detroit Lions ===
Oruwariye was drafted by the Detroit Lions in the fifth round (146th overall) of the 2019 NFL draft. He finished the season with two interceptions and third on the Lions' depth chart.

Oruwariye was placed on the reserve/COVID-19 list by the Lions on July 29, 2020, and was activated 10 days later. In Week 11 against the Carolina Panthers, Oruwariye recorded his first interception of the season off a pass thrown by P. J. Walker during the 20–0 loss. In the 2020 season, he appeared in 16 games and started 15. He finished with 53 total tackles (45 solo), one interception, and seven passes defended.

Oruwariye entered the 2021 season as a starting cornerback for the Lions. He started the first 14 games before suffering a thumb injury in Week 15. He was placed on injured reserve on December 25, ending his season. He finished the season with 57 tackles, and a team-leading 11 passes defensed and six interceptions. He was third in the NFL in interceptions at the time of his injury.

In the 2022 season, Oruwariye finished with 44 total tackles (36 solo), three passes defended, and one fumble recovery in 14 games and five starts.

=== New York Giants ===
On March 23, 2023, Oruwariye signed a one-year, $1.2 million contract with the New York Giants. He was released on August 29, and re-signed to the practice squad. Oruwariye was released on October 10.

=== Jacksonville Jaguars ===
On October 16, 2023, Oruwariye was signed to the Jacksonville Jaguars' practice squad. He was active in one game during the regular season, in Week 17 against the Carolina Panthers. Oruwariye signed a reserve/future contract with Jacksonville on January 8, 2024. He was released by the Jaguars as a part of final roster cuts on August 27.

=== Dallas Cowboys ===
On August 29, 2024, Oruwariye was signed to the Dallas Cowboys' practice squad. He was promoted to the active roster on October 26. In the Week 14 Monday Night Football game against the Cincinnati Bengals, with two minutes to go in a 20–20 game, Oruwariye muffed a blocked punt, which was eventually recovered by the Bengals for a first down. The Bengals would score the winning touchdown soon after. Oruwariye refused to speak to the media after the game concluded, and wore a towel on his head while walking to the locker room. He appeared in 7 games with 4 starts, recording 29 tackles (one for loss), one interception and 3 passes defensed.

=== Tennessee Titans ===
On May 13, 2025, Oruwariye signed with the Tennessee Titans. He was released on August 26 as part of final roster cuts and re-signed to the practice squad the next day. Oruwariye was released by the Titans on August 29.

=== Baltimore Ravens ===
On October 1, 2025, Oruwariye signed with the Baltimore Ravens' practice squad. He signed a reserve/future contract with Baltimore on January 5, 2026.

On August 30, 2026, Oruwariye was waived by the Ravens as a part of final roster cuts; he was re-signed to the team's practice squad the following day. On September 3, Oruwariye was released from the practice squad. On September 16, Oruwariye was re-signed to the practice squad.
