= Raequan Williams =

American football player (born 1997)

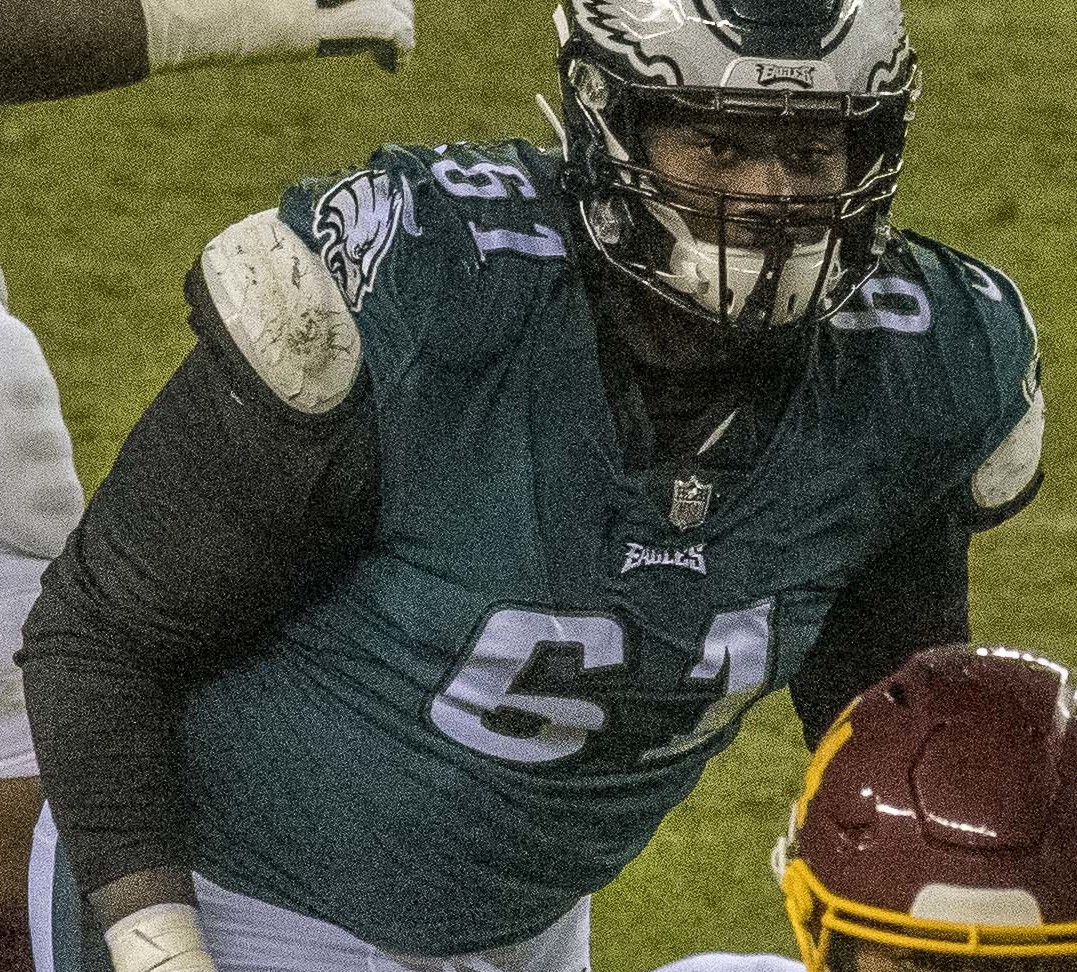
- Williams with the Philadelphia Eagles in 2021

Profile
- Position: Defensive end

Personal information
- Born: February 14, 1997 (age 29); Chicago, Illinois, U.S.
- Listed height: 6 ft 4 in (1.93 m)
- Listed weight: 312 lb (142 kg)

Career information
- High school: DePaul College Prep (Chicago)
- College: Michigan State (2015–2019)
- NFL draft: 2020: undrafted

Career history
- Philadelphia Eagles (2020–2021); Jacksonville Jaguars (2022)*; Carolina Panthers (2022–2023)*; Detroit Lions (2025)*
- * Offseason or practice squad member only

Awards and highlights
- 2× First-team All-Big Ten (2018, 2019)

Career NFL statistics as of 2025
- Total tackles: 7
- Sacks: 1
- Stats at Pro Football Reference

Raequan Williams (born February 14, 1997) is an American professional football defensive end. He played college football at Michigan State.

== Early life ==
Williams grew up in Lawndale and East Garfield Park, two of the most crime-ridden neighborhoods in Chicago. In sixth grade, he joined the Garfield Gators youth football team. Williams became a national all-star in eighth grade. Williams attended DePaul College Prep, formerly known as Gordon Tech, where he played basketball and football. He was named captain of the basketball team as a sophomore, coached by Tom Kleinschmidt. As a senior on the football team, he was named first-team all-state after recording 74 tackles, eight sacks, nine pass breakups and three forced fumbles. Williams was a four-star recruit ranked the No. 19 tackle in the nation according to 247Sports.com, and he signed with Michigan State in December 2014 after considering offers from Oregon, Arizona, Missouri, and Penn State, among others. Williams chose the Spartans after hearing fond memories from trusted adults who attended the university.

== College career ==
At Michigan State, Williams redshirted his freshman season. He started two games at nose tackle as a redshirt freshman. As a sophomore in 2017, Williams was named honorable mention All-Big Ten Conference and earned Michigan State's Iron Man award for strength and conditioning. He finished with 31 tackles, six tackles for loss and 2.5 sacks. As a junior, he was a first-team All-Big Ten honoree after tallying 53 tackles, 10.5 tackles for loss and two sacks. Despite being considered a potential NFL draft early entrant, Williams told coach Mark Dantonio he was returning for his senior season to improve as a pass rusher and earn his degree. Coming into his senior season, Williams was on the watchlist for the Outland Trophy. He earned second-team All-Big Ten honors as a senior in 2019. Williams recorded 48 tackles including 7.5 for loss, 5.0 sacks and one forced fumble. He participated in the East-West Shrine Bowl following the season. Williams made 42 consecutive starts at defensive tackle, which he considers one of his favorite achievements. He finished his career with 160 tackles, 29 for loss, and 11.5 sacks in his career.

== Professional career ==
Pre-draft measurables
Height	Weight	Arm length	Hand span	40-yard dash	10-yard split	20-yard split	20-yard shuttle	Three-cone drill	Vertical jump	Broad jump	Bench press
6 ft 4 in (1.93 m)	308 lb (140 kg)	33 3/8 in (0.85 m)	9 3/8 in (0.24 m)	5.04 s	1.78 s	2.96 s	4.78 s	7.72 s	25.5 in (0.65 m)	8 ft 5 in (2.57 m)	17 reps
All values from NFL Combine

=== Philadelphia Eagles ===
After going undrafted in the 2020 NFL draft, Williams signed an undrafted free agent deal with the Philadelphia Eagles. He was waived on September 5, 2020, and re-signed to the team's practice squad the next day. He was elevated to the active roster on October 31 and December 5 for the team's weeks 8 and 13 games against the Dallas Cowboys and Green Bay Packers, and reverted to the practice squad after each game. He made his NFL debut in the Cowboys game. On December 9, 2020, Williams was promoted to the active roster. In Week 17 against the Washington Football Team on Sunday Night Football, Williams recorded his first career sack on Alex Smith during the 20–14 loss.

On August 31, 2021, Williams was waived by the Eagles and re-signed to the practice squad the next day.

=== Jacksonville Jaguars ===
On February 2, 2022, Williams signed a reserve/future contract with the Jacksonville Jaguars. He was waived on August 30, 2022.

=== Carolina Panthers ===
On October 18, 2022, Williams was signed to the Carolina Panthers practice squad. He signed a reserve/future contract on January 9, 2023. On August 29, 2023, he was waived for final roster cuts, but signed to the Panthers' practice squad the following day. He signed a reserve/future contract on January 8, 2024. On May 10, 2024, Williams was waived for offseason roster cuts.

=== Detroit Lions ===
On May 12, 2025, Williams signed with the Detroit Lions. He was waived by Detroit on August 2.

== Personal life ==
Williams's mother Latasha Williams gave birth to him at the age of 14. He was also raised by Mackenzie Hyde, his third grade teacher whom he considers a godmother. On January 13, 2016, his cousin Antonio Pollards was murdered in a drive-by shooting on the way to school. Williams's brother Corey Hill was killed in a similar drive-by shooting on June 7, 2017. Neither murder has been solved.
