= Blake Hayes (Canadian football) =

Australian gridiron football player (born 1998)

No. 41
- Position: Punter

Personal information
- Born: August 13, 1998 (age 28); East St Kilda, Victoria, Australia
- Listed height: 6 ft 5 in (1.96 m)
- Listed weight: 225 lb (102 kg)

Career information
- High school: Brighton Grammar School (Brighton, Victoria)
- College: Illinois (2017–2021)
- NFL draft: 2022: undrafted
- CFL draft: 2022G: 2nd round, 10th overall pick

Career history
- Hamilton Tiger-Cats (2022–2023)

Awards and highlights
- Big Ten Punter of the Year (2019); First-team All-Big Ten (2019); 3× Third-team All-Big Ten (2018, 2020, 2021)

Career CFL statistics
- Games played: 2
- Punts: 12
- Punting yards: 563
- Average punt: 46.9
- Longest punt: 55
- Stats at CFL.ca
- Stats at Pro Football Reference

Blake Hayes (born August 13, 1998) is an Australian former professional football punter who played in the Canadian Football League (CFL) for the Hamilton Tiger-Cats. He played college football for the Illinois Fighting Illini.

== Early life ==
Hayes was born on August 13, 1998, in East St Kilda, Victoria, Australia. He attended Brighton Grammar School in Brighton, Victoria, where he played Australian rules football for three years. Hayes was a product of Prokick Australia.

== College career ==
Hayes played college football for the Illinois Fighting Illini from 2017 to 2021. As a freshman, he averaged 42.0 yards per kick with 22 punts inside the 20-yard line. The following year, Hayes averaged 43.6 yards per punt and earned third-team All-Big Ten honors.

In 2019, Hayes kicked 44.6 yards per punt, which was the second-most in school history and had 32 punts inside the 20-yard line. He was named to the first-team All-Big Ten team and was the Big Ten Punter of the Year. Hayes earned two further third-team All-Big Ten honors in his last two seasons, averaging 43.8 and 45.1 per kick respectively.

Hayes graduated holding Illinois records in single-season punts inside the 20, single-season percentage of punts inside the 20, single-season 50-plus yard punts, career punting average, career punt yards, career punts inside the 20 and career 50-plus yard punts.

== Professional career ==
Hayes was selected in the second round, with the tenth overall selection, by the Hamilton Tiger-Cats in the 2022 CFL global draft. He officially signed with the team on May 25. On June 5, Hayes was signed to the practice roster. On October 28, he was elevated to the active roster. Hayes played in two games and averaged 46.9 yards per punt with a long of 55 yards against the Montreal Alouettes in the East Semi-Final. On June 4, 2023, Hayes was signed to the practice roster. On June 27, he was released by the team.
