= Justin Layne =

American football player (born 1998)

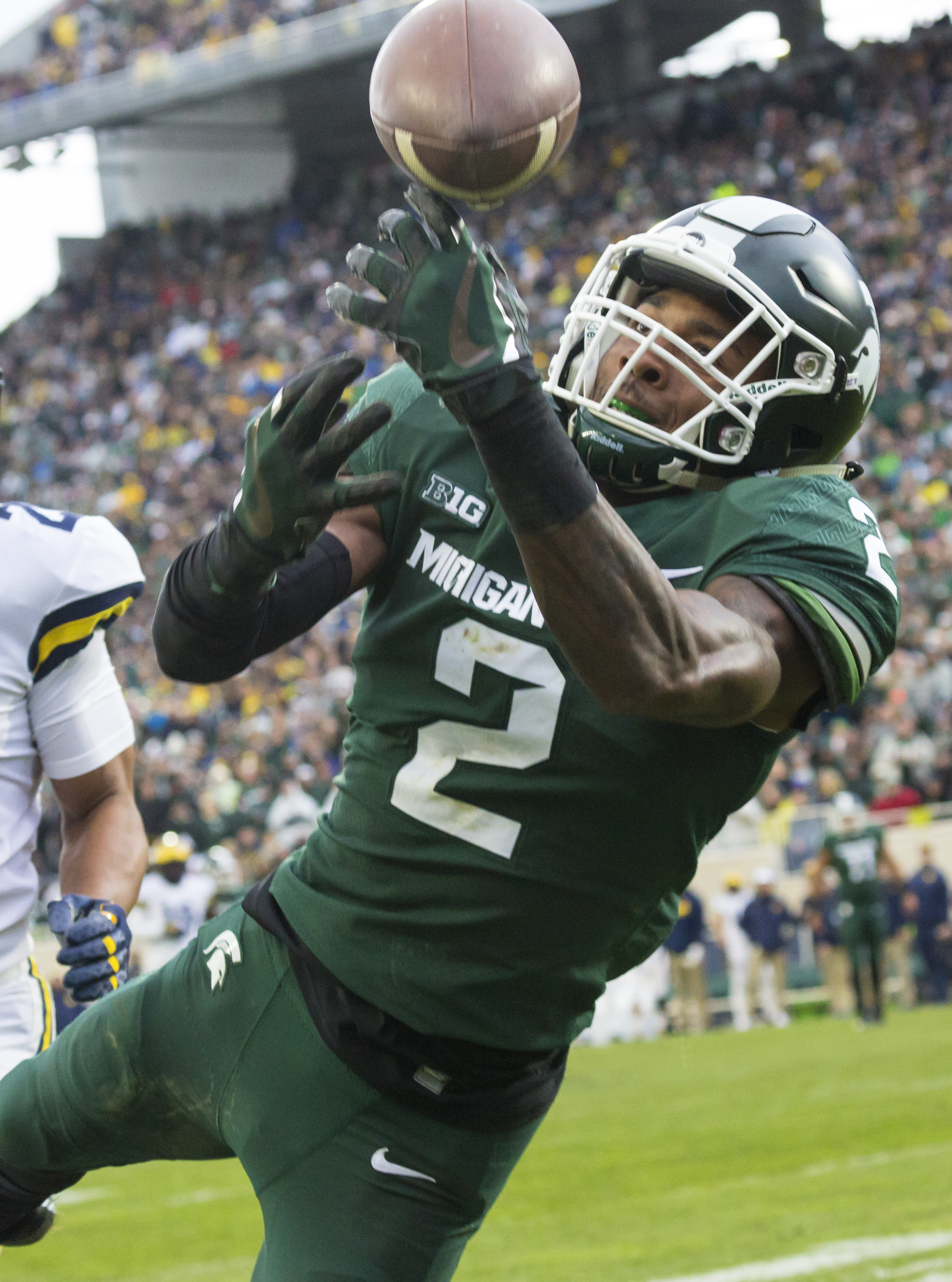
- Layne with Michigan State in 2018

No. 31, 35, 26
- Position: Cornerback

Personal information
- Born: January 12, 1998 (age 28); Cleveland, Ohio, U.S.
- Listed height: 6 ft 2 in (1.88 m)
- Listed weight: 192 lb (87 kg)

Career information
- High school: Benedictine (Cleveland)
- College: Michigan State (2016–2018)
- NFL draft: 2019: 3rd round, 83rd overall pick

Career history
- Pittsburgh Steelers (2019–2021); New York Giants (2022); Chicago Bears (2022); Carolina Panthers (2022)*
- * Offseason or practice squad member only

Awards and highlights
- Second-team All-Big Ten (2018)

Career NFL statistics
- Total tackles: 45
- Pass deflections: 1
- Fumble recoveries: 1
- Stats at Pro Football Reference

Justin Layne (born January 12, 1998) is an American former professional football player who was a cornerback in the National Football League (NFL). He played college football for the Michigan State Spartans.

== Early life ==
Layne attended Benedictine High School in Cleveland, Ohio. While there Layne was teammates with current NFL linebacker Jerome Baker. He played cornerback and wide receiver in high school. He committed to the Michigan State University to play college football.

== College career ==
Layne entered his freshman season with the Spartans in 2016 as a wide receiver but was converted into a cornerback prior to the fifth game of the season. During his career, he played in 34 games and had 130 tackles, three interceptions, 0.5 sacks and one touchdown. After his junior season, Layne entered the 2019 NFL draft.

== Professional career ==
Pre-draft measurables
Height	Weight	Arm length	Hand span	40-yard dash	10-yard split	20-yard split	20-yard shuttle	Three-cone drill	Vertical jump	Broad jump
6 ft 1 3/4 in (1.87 m)	192 lb (87 kg)	33 in (0.84 m)	9 1/4 in (0.23 m)	4.50 s	1.59 s	2.65 s	4.09 s	6.90 s	37.5 in (0.95 m)	11 ft 2 in (3.40 m)
All values from NFL Combine

=== Pittsburgh Steelers ===
Layne was selected by the Pittsburgh Steelers in the third round (83rd overall) of the 2019 NFL draft. He briefly appeared in ten games in 2019, getting only three tackles on the season.

Layne was placed on the reserve/COVID-19 list by the Steelers on July 29, 2020. He was activated on August 11, 2020. He appeared in all 16 games for the Steelers, and collected 22 tackles on the year. On August 30, 2022, he was released by the Steelers.

=== New York Giants ===
On August 31, 2022, Layne was claimed off waivers by the New York Giants. On November 14, 2022, he was waived.

=== Chicago Bears ===
On November 15, 2022, the Chicago Bears claimed Layne off waivers. He was waived on December 20.

=== Carolina Panthers ===
On December 21, 2022, Layne was claimed off waivers by the Carolina Panthers, but did not report to the team. He was released on March 8, 2023.
