= Montre Hartage =

American football player (born 1997)

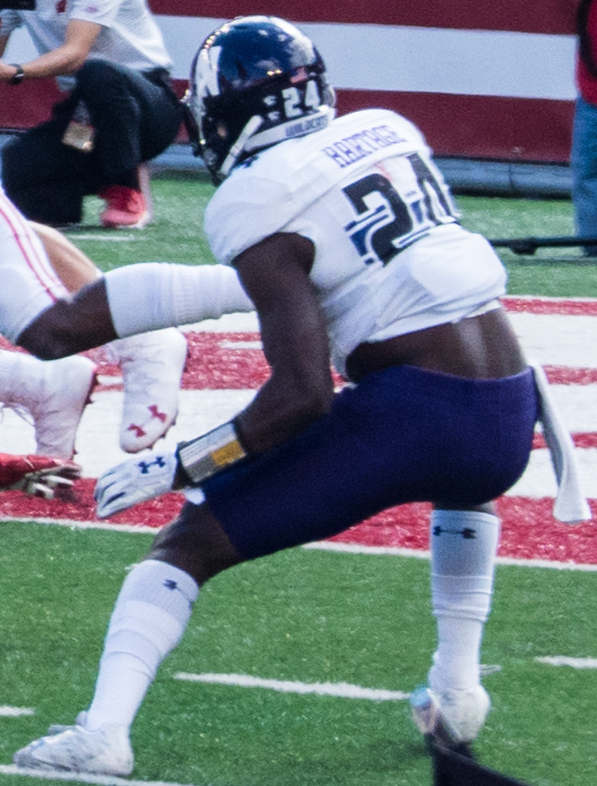
- Hartage with Northwestern in 2017

No. 41, 36
- Position: Safety

Personal information
- Born: June 16, 1997 (age 29); Cordele, Georgia, U.S.
- Listed height: 6 ft 0 in (1.83 m)
- Listed weight: 190 lb (86 kg)

Career information
- High school: Crisp County (Cordele)
- College: Northwestern
- NFL draft: 2019: undrafted

Career history
- Miami Dolphins (2019); New York Giants (2020)

Awards and highlights
- First-team All-Big Ten (2018)

Career NFL statistics
- Total tackles: 8
- Pass deflections: 1
- Stats at Pro Football Reference

Montre Hartage (born June 16, 1997) is an American former professional football player who was a safety in the National Football League (NFL). He played college football for the Northwestern Wildcats.

== College career ==
Hartage was a member of the Northwestern Wildcats for four seasons. As a senior, he was named first-team All-Big Ten Conference by the media and to the third-team by the league's coaches after recording 51 tackles, 13 pass breakups, two interceptions and a fumble recovery. He finished his collegiate career with 172 total tackles, ten interceptions, and 39 passes defended.

== Professional career ==
=== Miami Dolphins ===
Hartage was signed by the Miami Dolphins as an undrafted free agent on April 27, 2019. He was waived on August 31, 2019 as part of final roster cuts, but was re-signed to the team's practice squad. Hartage was promoted to the Dolphins' active roster on December 1 and made his NFL debut the same day against the Philadelphia Eagles. He was waived on December 3 and re-signed to the practice squad. He was promoted back to the active roster on December 14, 2019. Hartage was waived by the Dolphins on April 26, 2020.

=== New York Giants ===
Hartage was claimed off waivers by the New York Giants on April 28, 2020. He was waived/injured on September 5, 2020, and subsequently reverted to the team's injured reserve list the next day. He was waived with an injury settlement on September 10. He was re-signed to the Giants practice squad on October 27. He was elevated to the active roster on November 2 and November 7 for the team's weeks 8 and 9 games against the Tampa Bay Buccaneers and Washington Football Team, and reverted to the practice squad after each game. Hartage was promoted to the active roster on November 13. Hartage was waived on December 1, 2020, and re-signed to the practice squad two days later. On December 11, 2020, Hartage was signed to the active roster. On December 19, 2020, Hartage was waived by the Giants and re-signed to the practice squad three days later. He signed a reserve/future contract on January 4, 2021. He was waived/injured on August 24, 2021 and placed on injured reserve. He was released on September 2.
