= D'Cota Dixon =

American football player (born 1994)

Profile
- Position: Safety

Personal information
- Born: November 20, 1994 (age 31); New Smyrna Beach, Florida, U.S.
- Listed height: 5 ft 10 in (1.78 m)
- Listed weight: 204 lb (93 kg)

Career information
- High school: New Smyrna Beach
- College: Wisconsin
- NFL draft: 2019: undrafted

Career history
- Tampa Bay Buccaneers (2019–2020)

Awards and highlights
- First-team All-Big Ten (2017)
- Stats at Pro Football Reference

D'Cota Dixon (born November 20, 1994) is an American former professional football player who was a safety and rugby union player. He played college football for the Wisconsin Badgers before signing with the Tampa Bay Buccaneers. After being released by the Buccaneers, Dixon signed with rugby squad the American Raptors.

== Early life ==
Dixon was raised by a single mother who was sometimes beaten by her boyfriend; he and a brother were eventually placed into foster care. His father was a drug addict for much of Dixon's young life until he died of a heart attack when Dixon was in high school. After struggling with anger issues early in life, Dixon eventually became more mild-mannered, citing his Christian faith.

Dixon was a three-star recruit out of New Smyrna Beach High School in New Smyrna Beach, Florida. He committed to play for Wisconsin over offers from Michigan State, Illinois, West Virginia, and more.

== Football career ==
=== College career ===
Dixon started his sophomore, junior, and senior seasons on the Wisconsin Badgers football team, earning first-team All-Big Ten honors his junior year. Injuries hampered his senior campaign, but he was still invited to the 2019 NFL Scouting Combine.

After his senior season, Dixon was named the Jason Witten Collegiate Man of the Year award for exceptional character.

=== Professional career ===
Pre-draft measurables
Height	Weight	Arm length	Hand span	40-yard dash	10-yard split	Vertical jump	Broad jump	Bench press
5 ft 9.63 in (1.77 m)	204 lb (93 kg)	29.25 in (0.74 m)	9.13 in (0.23 m)	4.81 s	1.66 s	33.5 in (0.85 m)	10 ft 11 in (3.33 m)	20 reps
All values from NFL Combine

On May 13, 2019, Dixon signed with the Tampa Bay Buccaneers as an undrafted free agent. On August 8, 2019, Dixon was placed on injured reserve. Dixon was waived by the Buccaneers during final roster cuts on September 5, 2020, and was signed to the practice squad the following day. He was released on October 20.

== Rugby career ==
In 2021, Dixon signed with the independent rugby union team American Raptors in Glendale, Colorado as a wing. Dixon was recruited by his roommate and Raptors player Justin Barlow, who was recruited at a regional NFL combine. The Raptors competed independently, having left Major League Rugby in 2020. Dixon played the fall 2021 and spring 2022 campaigns with the Raptors.
