= Derwin Gray (offensive lineman) =

American football player (born 1995)

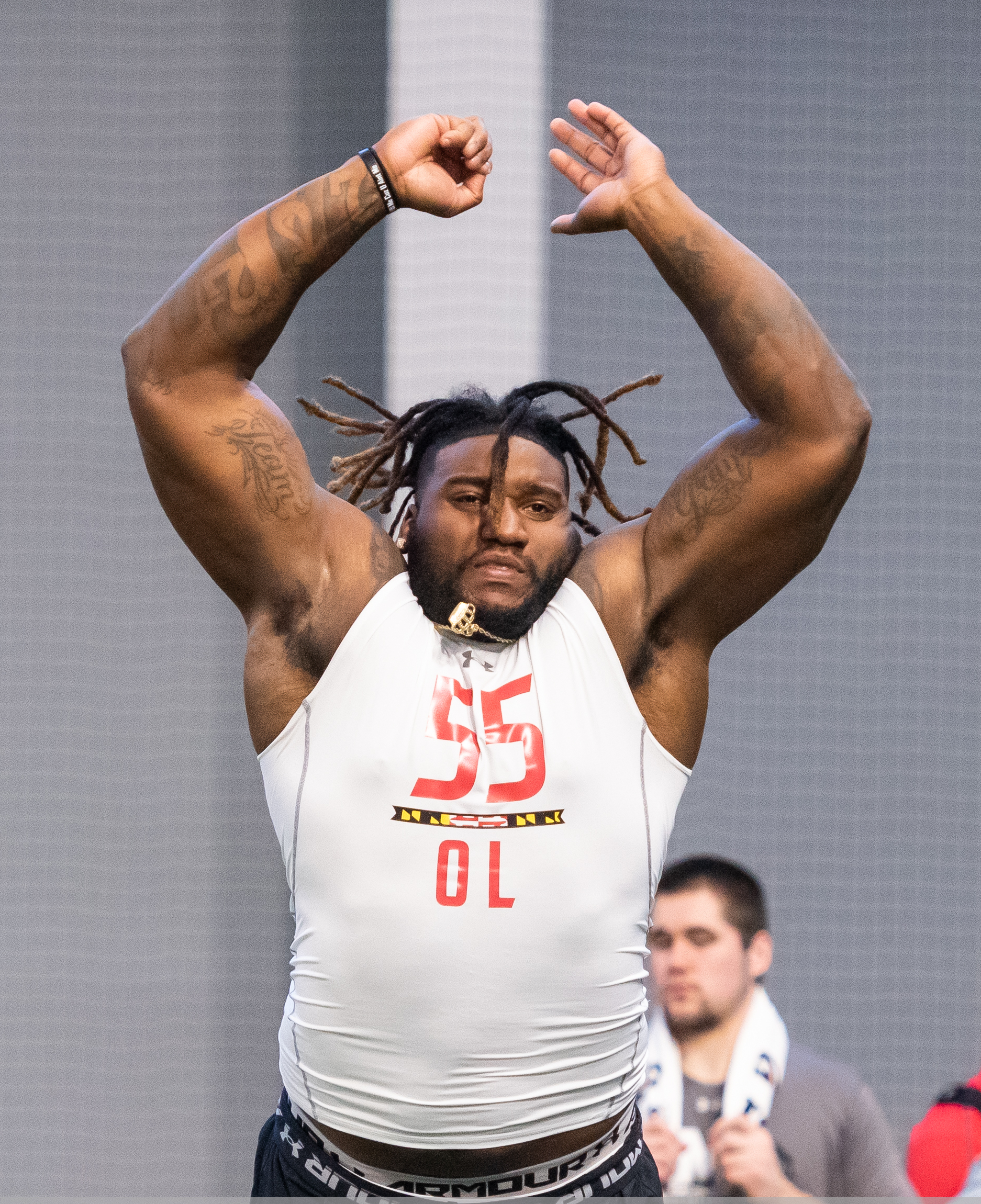
- Gray with the Maryland Terrapins at their pro day

BC Lions
- Position: Offensive lineman
- Roster status: Suspended

Personal information
- Born: May 10, 1995 (age 31); Washington, D.C., U.S.
- Listed height: 6 ft 4 in (1.93 m)
- Listed weight: 320 lb (145 kg)

Career information
- High school: Friendship Collegiate (Washington, D.C.)
- College: Maryland (2014–2018)
- NFL draft: 2019: 7th round, 219th overall pick

Career history
- Pittsburgh Steelers (2019–2020); Jacksonville Jaguars (2020); Tennessee Titans (2021–2022)*; Birmingham Stallions (2023–2024); BC Lions (2025–present)
- * Offseason or practice squad member only

Awards and highlights
- UFL champion (2024); USFL champion (2023)

Career NFL statistics
- Games played: 5
- Stats at Pro Football Reference

Derwin Devon Gray (born May 10, 1995) is an American professional football offensive lineman for the BC Lions of the Canadian Football League (CFL). He played college football at Maryland.

== Professional career ==
Pre-draft measurables
Height	Weight	Arm length	Hand span	Wingspan	40-yard dash	10-yard split	20-yard split	20-yard shuttle	Three-cone drill	Vertical jump	Broad jump	Bench press
6 ft 4 1/2 in (1.94 m)	320 lb (145 kg)	34 3/8 in (0.87 m)	9 5/8 in (0.24 m)	6 ft 9 5/8 in (2.07 m)	5.26 s	1.85 s	3.07 s	4.94 s	8.15 s	26.0 in (0.66 m)	8 ft 4 in (2.54 m)	26 reps
All values from NFL Combine/Pro Day

=== Pittsburgh Steelers ===
Gray was drafted by the Pittsburgh Steelers in the seventh round, 219th overall, of the 2019 NFL draft. He was waived on August 31, 2019, and was signed to the practice squad the next day. On December 30, he was signed by the Steelers to a reserve/future contract.

On September 5, 2020, Gray was waived by the Steelers and was signed to the practice squad the next day. He was promoted to the active roster on September 18, 2020. He was waived on December 26, 2020.

=== Jacksonville Jaguars ===
On December 28, 2020, Gray was claimed off waivers by the Jacksonville Jaguars. He signed a one-year exclusive-rights free agent tender with the Jaguars on March 26, 2021. He was waived on August 24, 2021.

=== Tennessee Titans ===
On August 25, 2021, Gray was claimed off waivers by the Tennessee Titans. He was waived on August 31, 2021, and re-signed to the practice squad. He was released on September 7. He was re-signed to the practice squad on October 12. After the Titans were eliminated in the Divisional Round of the 2021 playoffs, he signed a reserve/future contract on January 24, 2022. He was waived on June 6, 2022.

=== Birmingham Stallions ===
Gray signed with the Birmingham Stallions of the United States Football League on December 21, 2022.

=== BC Lions ===
On February 19, 2025, Gray left the Stallions and signed with the BC Lions of the Canadian Football League (CFL). On May 11, 2025, Gray was suspended by the CFL for the entire 2025 and 2026 CFL seasons.
