= 2016 Ohio State Buckeyes football team =

American college football season

2016 Ohio State Buckeyes football

Big Ten East Division co-champion

Fiesta Bowl (CFP Semifinal), L 0–31 vs. Clemson
- Conference: Big Ten Conference
- East Division

Ranking
- Coaches: No. 6
- AP: No. 6
- Record: 11–2 (8–1 Big Ten)
- Head coach: Urban Meyer (5th season)
- Offensive coordinator: Ed Warinner (5th season)
- Co-offensive coordinator: Tim Beck (2nd season)
- Offensive scheme: Spread
- Defensive coordinator: Luke Fickell (11th season)
- Co-defensive coordinator: Greg Schiano (1st season)
- Base defense: Multiple
- Captains: J. T. Barrett; Pat Elflein; Raekwon McMillan; Curtis Samuel; Joe Burger
- Home stadium: Ohio Stadium

2016 Big Ten Conference football standings
	Conf.			Overall
Team	W		L	W		L
East Division
No. 7 Penn State xy$	8	–	1	11	–	3
No. 6 Ohio State x^	8	–	1	11	–	2
No. 10 Michigan	7	–	2	10	–	3
Indiana	4	–	5	6	–	7
Maryland	3	–	6	6	–	7
Michigan State	1	–	8	3	–	9
Rutgers	0	–	9	2	–	10
West Division
No. 9 Wisconsin xy	7	–	2	11	–	3
Iowa	6	–	3	8	–	5
Nebraska	6	–	3	9	–	4
Minnesota	5	–	4	9	–	4
Northwestern	5	–	4	7	–	6
Illinois	2	–	7	3	–	9
Purdue	1	–	8	3	–	9
Championship: Penn State 38, Wisconsin 31
^ – College Football Playoff participant; $ – Conference champion; x – Division champion/co-champions; y – Championship game participant; Rankings from AP Poll

The 2016 Ohio State Buckeyes football team represented Ohio State University in the 2016 NCAA Division I FBS football season. It was the Buckeyes' 127th overall, the 104th as a member of the Big Ten Conference, and third as a member of the Eastern Division. The team was led by Urban Meyer, in his fifth year as head coach, and played its home games at Ohio Stadium in Columbus, Ohio.

Ohio State was the preseason favorite to win the Big Ten, and were ranked sixth in the preseason AP Poll. They began the year with six straight victories, including on the road against then-No. 14 Oklahoma and in double overtime against then-No. 8 Wisconsin, and rose to second in the AP Poll. However, the next week they suffered their first loss at Penn State in a White Out game at Beaver Stadium. The team won its remaining regular season games, and finished conference play with an overtime victory against third-ranked Michigan. Penn State and Ohio State both finished with conference records of 8–1, and Penn State advanced to the 2016 Big Ten Football Championship Game due to the head-to-head victory. Despite this, and Penn State's victory over Wisconsin in that game, Ohio State was ranked ahead of Penn State at third in the final College Football Playoff rankings, earning them a spot in the national semi-final Fiesta Bowl against second-ranked Clemson. The Buckeyes were shutout in that game 31–0 and ended the year at 11–2.

The Buckeyes were led on offense by quarterback J. T. Barrett, who finished with 2,555 passing yards and 24 touchdowns. Running back Mike Weber led the team with 1,096 rushing yards and nine touchdowns. Center Pat Elflein was named a unanimous first-team All-American and was the recipient of the Rimington Trophy as the nation's top center. On defense, cornerback Malik Hooker led the Big Ten with seven interceptions (three returned for a touchdown) and was also a unanimous first-team All-American.

== Offseason ==
=== Players lost ===
- QB Cardale Jones – drafted by the Buffalo Bills in Round 4 of the 2016 NFL draft with the 139th overall pick
- RB Ezekiel Elliott – drafted by the Dallas Cowboys in Round 1 of the 2016 NFL draft with the 4th overall pick
- WR Jalin Marshall – undrafted, signed with the New York Jets
- WR Michael Thomas – drafted by the New Orleans Saints in Round 2 of the 2016 NFL draft with the 47th overall pick
- WR Braxton Miller – drafted by the Houston Texans in Round 3 of the 2016 NFL draft with the 85th overall pick
- TE Nick Vannett – drafted by the Seattle Seahawks in Round 3 of the 2016 NFL draft with the 94th overall pick
- OT Taylor Decker – drafted by the Detroit Lions in Round 1 of the 2016 NFL draft with the 16th overall pick
- OL Chase Farris – undrafted, signed with the Detroit Lions
- DE Joey Bosa – drafted by the San Diego Chargers in Round 1 of the 2016 NFL draft with the 3rd overall pick
- DT Adolphus Washington – drafted by the Buffalo Bills in Round 3 of the 2016 NFL draft with the 80th overall pick
- LB Darron Lee – drafted by the New York Jets in Round 1 of the 2016 NFL draft with the 20th overall pick
- LB Joshua Perry – drafted by the San Diego Chargers in Round 4 of the 2016 NFL draft with the 102nd overall pick
- CB Eli Apple – drafted by the New York Giants in Round 1 of the 2016 NFL draft with the 10th overall pick
- S Tyvis Powell – undrafted, signed with the Seattle Seahawks
- S Vonn Bell – drafted by the New Orleans Saints in Round 2 of the 2016 NFL draft with the 61st overall pick

== Schedule ==
Date	Time	Opponent	Rank	Site	TV	Result	Attendance
September 3	12:00 p.m.	Bowling Green*	No. 6	Ohio Stadium; Columbus, OH	BTN	W 77–10	107,193
September 10	3:30 p.m.	Tulsa*	No. 4	Ohio Stadium; Columbus, OH	ABC	W 48–3	104,410
September 17	9:00 p.m.	at No. 14 Oklahoma*	No. 3	Gaylord Family Oklahoma Memorial Stadium; Norman, OK	FOX	W 45–24	87,979
October 1	12:00 p.m.	Rutgers^{†}	No. 2	Ohio Stadium; Columbus, OH	BTN	W 58–0	105,830
October 8	3:30 p.m.	Indiana	No. 2	Ohio Stadium; Columbus, OH	ESPN	W 38–17	107,420
October 15	8:00 p.m.	at No. 8 Wisconsin	No. 2	Camp Randall Stadium; Madison, WI (College GameDay)	ABC	W 30–23 ^{OT}	81,541
October 22	8:00 p.m.	at Penn State	No. 2	Beaver Stadium; University Park, PA (rivalry)	ABC	L 21–24	107,280
October 29	3:30 p.m.	Northwestern	No. 6	Ohio Stadium; Columbus, OH	ESPN	W 24–20	107,296
November 5	8:00 p.m.	No. 10 Nebraska	No. 6	Ohio Stadium; Columbus, OH	ABC	W 62–3	108,750
November 12	3:30 p.m.	at Maryland	No. 5	Maryland Stadium; College Park, MD	ESPN	W 62–3	48,090
November 19	12:00 p.m.	at Michigan State	No. 2	Spartan Stadium; East Lansing, MI	ESPN	W 17–16	73,303
November 26	12:00 p.m.	No. 3 Michigan	No. 2	Ohio Stadium; Columbus, OH (rivalry, College GameDay)	ABC	W 30–27 ^{2OT}	110,045^{‡}
December 31	7:00 p.m.	vs. No. 2 Clemson*	No. 3	University of Phoenix Stadium; Glendale, AZ (Fiesta Bowl–CFP Semifinal, College GameDay)	ESPN	L 0–31	71,279
*Non-conference game; ^{†}Homecoming; Rankings from AP Poll and CFP Rankings (after November 1) released prior to game; All times are in Eastern time

^{‡}Ohio Stadium attendance record

== Roster ==
2016 Ohio State Buckeyes football team roster
Players
Coaches
Offense

Pos.	#	Name	Class
WR	1	Johnnie Dixon	So
HB	2	Dontre Wilson	Sr
RB	4	Curtis Samuel (C)	Jr
WR	5	Corey Smith	Sr
WR, QB	6	Torrance Gibson	Fr
QB	7	Dwayne Haskins	Fr
WR	9	Binjimen Victor	Fr
QB	10	Joe Burrow	Fr
QB	11	Justin Cook	Jr
QB	13	Stephen Collier	Jr
WR	14	K. J. Hill	Fr
QB	16	J. T. Barrett (C)	Jr
TE	18	Chase Hounshell	Sr
WR	19	Joe Ramstetter	Sr
RB	20	Mike Weber	So
WR	21	Parris Campbell	So
WR	23	Devlin McDaniel	Sr
TE	24	Kierre Hawkins	Fr
RB	25	Bri'onte Dunn	Jr
RB	26	Antonio Williams	Fr
RB	30	Demario McCall	Fr
WR	33	Austin Clutter	So
RB	35	Alex Backenstoe	Jr
TE	37	Derrick Malone	So
TE	44	Guy Ferrelli	Sr
RB	46	Ke'Von Huguely	So
OL	54	Billy Price	Jr
G	56	Matthew Burrell	Jr
OL	59	Isaiah Prince	So
OL	60	Blake Pfenning	So
OL	61	Gavin Cupp	Fr
OL	62	Aaron Parry	Sr
OL	63	Kevin Woidke	So
OL	64	Jack Wohlabaugh	Fr
OC	65	Pat Elflein (C)	Sr
OL	66	Malcolm Pridgeon	Jr
OL	69	Brandon Pahl	So
OL	71	Kyle Trout	So
OL	72	Tyler Gerald	Fr
G	73	Michael Jordan	Fr
OT	74	Jamarco Jones	Jr
G	75	Evan Lisle	Jr
OT	76	Branden Bowen	Fr
OT	77	Kevin Feder	Fr
OL	78	Demetrius Knox	So
OL	79	Brady Taylor	So
WR	80	Noah Brown	So
TE	81	Jake Hausmann	Fr
WR	82	James Clark	Jr
WR	83	Terry McLaurin	So
TE	85	Marcus Baugh	Jr
WR	87	Alex Stump	Fr
TE	88	A. J. Alexander	Fr
TE	89	Luke Farrell	Fr

Defense

Pos.	#	Name	Class
CB	2	Marshon Lattimore	So
CB	3	Damon Arnette	Fr
CB	4	Jordan Fuller	Fr
LB	5	Raekwon McMillan (C)	Jr
DE	6	Sam Hubbard	So
CB	7	Damon Webb	Jr
CB	8	Gareon Conley	Jr
DL	9	Jashon Cornell	Fr
DE	11	Jalyn Holmes	Jr
CB	12	Denzel Ward	So
DE	13	Rashod Berry	So
LB	14	Keandre Jones	Fr
DB	15	Cameron Howard	Sr
DB	15	Wayne Davis	Fr
S	16	Cam Burrows	Sr
LB	17	Jerome Baker	So
CB	17	C. J. Saunders	So
DE	18	Jonathon Cooper	Fr
S	19	Eric Glover-Williams	So
S	20	Khaleed Franklin	Sr
CB	21	Trevon Forte	Jr
S	23	Jahsen Wint	Fr
S	24	Malik Hooker	So
CB	25	Logan Kelleher	Jr
S	26	Jarrod Barnes	Sr
S	28	Michael Cibene	Sr
CB	28	Joshua Norwood	Fr
DB	29	Rodjay Burns	Fr
LB	30	Jared Drake	So
CB	32	Elijaah Goins	Jr
LB	33	Dante Booker	Jr
S	34	Erick Smith	Jr
LB	35	Chris Worley	Jr
LB	36	Zach Turnure	Sr
S	37	Michael Lawless	Sr
LB	38	Craig Fada	Sr
LB	39	Malik Harrison	Fr
DE	42	Darius Slade	So
LB	43	Nick Conner	Fr
S	46	Cin'Quan Haney	Sr
LB	47	Justin Hilliard	Fr
LB	48	Joe Burger (C)	Sr
DT	53	Davon Hamilton	Fr
DT	55	Malik Barrow	Fr
DT	57	Robert Landers	Fr
DT	58	Joshua Alabi	Fr
DE	59	Tyquan Lewis	Jr
DE	70	Curtis Henry	Jr
DT	77	Michael Hill	Jr
DT	86	Dre'Mont Jones	Fr
DL	93	Tracy Sprinkle	Jr
DL	94	Dylan Thompson	So
DL	52	Noah Donald	Fr
DL	97	Nick Bosa	Fr

Special teams

Pos.	#	Name	Class
K	29	Alex Craft	So
LS	44	Aaron Mawhirter	Sr
LS	49	Liam McCullough	Fr
P	91	Drue Chrisman	Fr
K	92	Tyler Durbin	Sr
P	95	Cameron Johnston	Sr
K	96	Sean Nuernberger	Jr

Head coach

- Urban Meyer

Coordinators/assistant coaches

- Ed Warinner (offensive coordinator / offensive line)
- Tim Beck (Co-offensive Coordinator / quarterbacks)
- Tony Alford (assistant head coach / running backs)
- Greg Studrawa (offensive line)
- Zack Smith (wide receivers)
- Luke Fickell (Co-defensive Coordinator / Linebackers)
- Greg Schiano (Co-defensive Coordinator / Associate head coach)
- Larry Johnson (assistant head coach / defensive line)
- Kerry Coombs (special teams coordinator / cornerbacks)
- Matt Thurin (quality control coach – defense)
- Jim Cordle (graduate assistant)
- Brian Mason (graduate assistant)
- Matt Merritt (graduate assistant – offense)
- Mickey Marotti (assistant athletic director for football sports performance)
- Brady Collins (assistant strength & conditioning)
- Phil Matusz (assistant strength & conditioning)
- Kenny Parker (assistant strength & conditioning)
- Jeff Uhlenhake (assistant strength & conditioning)
- Quinn Barham (assistant strength & conditioning)
- Brian Voltolini (director of football operations)
- Mark Pantoni (director of player personnel)
- Tim Hinton (Executive Director for Football Operations)

Legend

- (C) Team captain
- (S) Suspended
- (I) Ineligible
- Injured
- Redshirt

Roster
Last update: November 26, 2016

== Depth chart ==
Defense

FS
24 Malik Hooker
34 Erick Smith

WLB	MLB	SLB
17 Jerome Baker	5 Raekwon McMillan	35 Chris Worley
48 Joe Burger	38 Craig Fada	39 Malik Harrison

SS
7 Damon Webb
4 Jordan Fuller

CB
2 Marshon Lattimore
12 Denzel Ward

DE	DT	DT	DE
6 Sam Hubbard	86 Dre'Mont Jones	77 Michael Hill	59 Tyquan Lewis
97 Nick Bosa	53 Davon Hamilton	67 Robert Landers	10 Jalyn Holmes

CB
8 Gareon Conley
3 Damon Arnette

Offense

WR
14 K.J. Hill
83 Terry McLaurin

H-Back
4 Curtis Samuel
2 Dontre Wilson

LT	LG	C	RG	RT
74 Jamarco Jones	73 Michael Jordan	65 Pat Elflein	54 Billy Price	59 Isaiah Prince
75 Evan Lisle	69 Matthew Burrell	79 Brady Taylor	78 Demetris Knox	76 Branden Bowen

TE
85 Marcus Baugh
88 A.J Alexander

WR
81 Noah Brown
21 Parris Campbell

QB
16 J. T. Barrett
10 Joe Burrow

Special teams

RB
25 Mike Weber
4 Curtis Samuel 30 Demario McCall

== Rankings ==
Ranking movements Legend: ██ Increase in ranking ██ Decrease in ranking ( ) = First-place votes
	Week															
Poll	Pre	1	2	3	4	5	6	7	8	9	10	11	12	13	14	Final
AP	6 (1)	4	3	2 (4)	2 (4)	2 (6)	2 (2)	2	6	6	6	2	2	2	2	6
Coaches	5	4	4	2 (3)	2 (2)	2 (3)	2 (4)	2 (2)	8	6	5	2	2	2	2	6
CFP	Not released									6	5	2	2	2	3	Not released

== Game summaries ==
=== Bowling Green ===
Team	1	2	3	4	Total
Bowling Green	7	3	0	0	10
• #6 Ohio State	21	14	21	21	77

- Location:
  Ohio Stadium
  Columbus, OH
- Game start: 12:00 p.m.
- Elapsed time: 3:30
- Game attendance: 107,193
- Game weather: Sunny
- Referee: Ron Snodgrass
- TV announcers (BTN): Kevin Kugler (Play-By-Play), Matt Millen (Analyst), Lisa Byington (Sideline)

Scoring summary
1	12:19	Bowling Green	Brandon Harris 63 yd interception return (Jake Suder kick)	Bowling Green 7–0
1	10:40	Ohio State	K. J. Hill 47 yd pass from J. T. Barrett (Tyler Durbin kick)	Tied 7–7
1	4:49	Ohio State	Dontre Wilson 25 yd pass from J. T. Barrett (Tyler Durbin kick)	Ohio State 14–7
1	3:05	Ohio State	Curtis Samuel 79 yd pass from J. T. Barrett (Tyler Durbin kick)	Ohio State 21–7
2	9:37	Bowling Green	Jake Suder 33 yd field goal	Ohio State 21–10
2	6:57	Ohio State	Noah Brown 25 yd pass from J. T. Barrett (Tyler Durbin kick)	Ohio State 28–10
2	0:26	Ohio State	J. T. Barrett 9 yd run (Tyler Durbin kick)	Ohio State 35–10
3	13:45	Ohio State	Curtis Samuel 21 yd pass from J. T. Barrett (Tyler Durbin kick)	Ohio State 42–10
3	9:03	Ohio State	Curtis Samuel 12 yd run (Tyler Durbin kick)	Ohio State 49–10
3	7:35	Ohio State	Dontre Wilson 11 yd pass from J. T. Barrett (Tyler Durbin kick)	Ohio State 56–10
4	14:50	Ohio State	Demario McCall 36 yd pass from Joe Burrow (Tyler Durbin kick)	Ohio State 63–10
4	6:10	Ohio State	Demario McCall 16 yd run (Tyler Durbin kick)	Ohio State 70–10
4	3:23	Ohio State	Rodjay Burns 75 yd interception return (Tyler Durbin kick)	Ohio State 77–10

The Ohio State Buckeyes defeated the Bowling Green Falcons by a score of 77–10 at Ohio Stadium in Columbus, Ohio. Ohio State's offense started off slow by QB, J. T. Barrett throwing an interception returned for a touchdown to Brandon Harris. Ohio State then went on to score 21 unanswered points before BGSU made a field goal midway through the second quarter. Ohio State scored two more times and led at halftime 35–10. The Buckeyes went on to score six more touchdowns in the second half and allowing no scoring.

Ohio State's offense gained 776 yards, which broke the record of most yards in a game held since 1930, and scored ten touchdowns. The Ohio State defense, commonly known as the Silver Bullets, allowed 244 yards and scored a defensive touchdown. Ohio State's J. T. Barrett set a record for the most touchdowns in a game with seven and tied the single-game record of six passing touchdowns. For his performance Barrett was named Big Ten Offensive Player of the Week.

Game Statistics

Statistic	OSU	BGSU
Total yards	776	244
Passing yards	417	175
Rushing yards	359	69
Penalties	9–66	5–45
Turnovers	1	3
Time of Possession	38:25	21:25

Game Leaders

Statistic	OSU	BGSU
Passing	J. T. Barrett (349)	James Knapke (110)
Rushing	Mike Weber (136)	Fred Coppet (38)
Receiving	Curtis Samuel (177)	Ronnie Moore (45)

=== Tulsa ===
Team	1	2	3	4	Total
Tulsa	3	0	0	0	3
• #4 Ohio State	3	17	14	14	48

- Location:
  Ohio Stadium
  Columbus, OH
- Game start: 3:30 p.m.
- Elapsed time: 3:45
- Game attendance: 104,410
- Game weather: Overcast/Rain
- Referee: Jeffrey Servinski
- TV announcers (ABC/ESPN): Dave Pasch (Play-by-Play), Greg McElroy (Analyst), Tom Luginbill (Sideline)

Ohio State (1–0) took on the Tulsa Golden Hurricane (1–0) and won by a final of 48–3 in Columbus, Ohio. Following the kickoff by Ohio State, Dane Evans' pass was intercepted by Ohio State's Marshon Lattimore during the first offensive possession of the game. Ohio State was unable to find their way into the endzone and settled for a 29-yard Tyler Durbin field goal to make the score 3–0. Tulsa and Ohio State went on to trade field goals to make it 6–3, Ohio State. The OSU defense then forced turnovers on the next three Tulsa possessions, scoring two defensive touchdowns, to end the half up 20–3.

There was a weather delay of 50 minutes at halftime due to lightning strikes in the general vicinity of the stadium.

The Buckeyes scored to open the second half on a 9-play, 72-yard drive, capped by an 11-yard touchdown run by J. T. Barrett. The OSU offense went on to add three more touchdowns. The Silver Bullet defense of Ohio State forced two second-half turnovers and allowed no offensive points from the Golden Hurricane.

Game Statistics

Statistic	OSU	Tulsa
Total yards	417	188
Passing yards	149	127
Rushing yards	268	61
Penalties	9–67	5–46
Turnovers	1	6
Time of Possession	33:53	26:07

Game Leaders

Statistic	OSU	Tulsa
Passing	J. T. Barrett (149)	Dane Evans (127)
Rushing	Mike Weber (92)	D'Angelo Brewer (58)
Receiving	Curtis Samuel (62)	Keevan Lucas (53)

=== At Oklahoma ===
Team	1	2	3	4	Total
• #3 Ohio State	14	21	7	3	45
#14 Oklahoma	7	10	7	0	24

- Location:
  Gaylord Family Oklahoma Memorial Stadium
  Norman, OK
- Game start: 9:00 p.m.
- Elapsed time: 3:30
- Game attendance: 87,979
- Game weather: Partly Cloudy
- Referee: John O'Neill
- TV announcers (FSN): Gus Johnson (Play-by-Play), Joel Klatt (Color), Shannon Spake (Sideline)

After kickoff was delayed from the original start time of 7:30 p.m. due to lightning and thunderstorms in the vicinity of the University of Oklahoma, the Buckeyes (2–0) and Sooners (1–1) began play at 9:00 p.m. in Norman, Oklahoma. Ohio State struck first, midway through the first quarter on a Curtis Samuel 36-yard touchdown run. On Oklahoma's next possession, Ohio State's Jerome Baker intercepted Baker Mayfield's pass to score a touchdown on a 68-yard interception return. This was Ohio State's fourth defensive score in their first three games. During the ensuing kickoff, Oklahoma's Joe Mixon returned the kick for a 97-yard touchdown, to make the score 14–7, Ohio State. Though not caught, Mixon dropped the ball before he crossed the goal line and fumbled into the end zone. Ohio State scored another two touchdowns and Oklahoma made a field goal to make the score 28–10. With six minutes to go in the half, Oklahoma scored on a 35-yard Mayfield pass to A.D. Miller to give the OSU defense their first allowed offensive touchdown of the year and brought the Sooners within 11. The Buckeye offense drove 75 yards to end the first half on a behind-the-back grab by Noah Brown to give the Buckeyes a 35–17 halftime advantage.

Ohio State scored on their opening possession of the half with Noah Brown's school record tying fourth touchdown reception. Oklahoma scored again with four minutes to go in the third quarter to make the score 42–24, Ohio State. The final score of the game was a 31-yard Tyler Durbin field goal with 10:33 to go making the final 45–24.

Noah Brown was named Big Ten Offensive Player of the Week and Jerome Baker was named conference co-Defensive Player of the Week for their performances.

Baker Mayfield (the Sooners starting QB) claimed that the Ohio State team and fans who traveled to Norman sang their fight song after their win. Baker Mayfield cites this as his reasoning for spiking the flag on the Ohio State symbol at the 50 yard line in the 2017 rematch in Columbus.

Game Statistics

Statistic	OSU	Okla
Total yards	443	403
Passing yards	152	226
Rushing yards	291	177
Penalties	11–75	4–28
Turnovers	0	2
Time of Possession	35:49	24:11

Game Leaders

Statistic	OSU	Okla
Passing	J. T. Barrett (152)	Baker Mayfield (226)
Rushing	Mike Weber (123)	Joe Mixon (78)
Receiving	Noah Brown (72)	A.D. Miller (72)

=== Rutgers ===
Team	1	2	3	4	Total
Rutgers	0	0	0	0	0
• #2 Ohio State	6	24	21	7	58

- Location:
  Ohio Stadium
  Columbus, OH
- Game start: 12:00 p.m.
- Elapsed time: 3:45
- Game attendance: 105,830
- Game weather: Sunny
- Referee: J. Servinski
- TV announcers (BTN): Kevin Kugler (Play-By-Play), Matt Millen (Analyst), Lisa Byington (Sideline)

The Ohio State Buckeyes (4–0, 1–0) played the Rutgers Scarlet Knights (2–3, 0–2) in Columbus, Ohio on Oct. 1, 2016. The Buckeyes won by a score of 58–0. Ohio State allowed only 121 total yards (33 passing, 83 rushing) and gained 669 (259 passing, 410 rushing.) This was their largest regular season conference shut out since 1981 and their first since 2013. Ohio State's J. T. Barrett, set the Ohio State record for most career passing touchdowns with 59.

Mike Weber was named the conference's Freshman player of the week for his performance in the game. He rushed for 144 yards and one touchdown on 14 carries and caught one pass for three yards.

Former head coach Earle Bruce dotted the "i" in Script Ohio prior to the game.

Game Statistics

Statistic	OSU	RUT
Total yards	669	116
Passing yards	259	33
Rushing yards	410	83
Penalties	6–64	4–21
Turnovers	1	0
Time of Possession	38:48	21:12

Game Leaders

Statistic	OSU	RUT
Passing	J. T. Barrett (238)	Chris Laviano (33)
Rushing	Mike Weber (144)	Robert Martin (40)
Receiving	Curtis Samuel (86)	Jawuan Harris (33)

=== Indiana ===
Team	1	2	3	4	Total
Indiana	3	7	7	0	17
• #2 Ohio State	3	21	7	7	38

- Location:
  Ohio Stadium
  Columbus, OH
- Game start: 3:30 p.m.
- Elapsed time: 3:20
- Game attendance: 107,420
- Game weather: Sunny
- Referee: Ron Snodgrass
- TV announcers (ESPN): Bob Wischusen (Play-by-play), Brock Huard (Analyst), Allison Williams (Sidelines)

Ohio State (5–0, 2–0) defeated Indiana (3–2, 2–1) by a score of 38–17. This Buckeye victory extended the longest current Big Ten win streak against a single opponent to 21, with the Hoosiers' last win over the Buckeyes coming in 1988.

The Indiana secondary held the Buckeye pass offense to only 93 yards passing, but allowed 290 yards and four touchdowns on the ground. This included a career-high of 26 careers for J. T. Barrett. The Buckeye defense forced two turnovers and allowed only 99 yards rushing on 40 attempts.

Game Statistics

Statistic	OSU	IND
Total yards	383	281
Passing yards	93	182
Rushing yards	290	99
Penalties	9–83	5–40
Turnovers	2	2
Time of Possession	32:58	27:02

Game Leaders

Statistic	OSU	IND
Passing	J. T. Barrett (93)	Richard Lagow (182)
Rushing	J. T. Barrett (137)	Devine Redding (78)
Receiving	Dontre Wilson (42)	Nick Westbrook-Ikhine (67)

=== At Wisconsin ===
Team	1	2	3	4	OT	Total
• #2 Ohio State	3	3	7	10	7	30
#8 Wisconsin	10	6	0	7	0	23

- Location:
  Camp Randall Stadium
  Madison, WI
- Game start: 8:00 p.m.
- Elapsed time: 4:03
- Game attendance: 81,541
- Game weather: Cloudy
- Referee: D. Willard
- TV announcers (ABC): Chris Fowler (Play-by-play), Kirk Herbstreit (Analyst), Samantha Ponder (Sidelines)

Scoring summary
Q1	9:03	WIS	Andrew Endicott 46-yard field goal	WIS 0–3
Q1	6:17	WIS	Jazz Peavy 24-yard pass from Alex Hornibrook (Andrew Endicott kick)	WIS 0–10
Q1	2:46	OSU	Tyler Durbin 25-yard field goal	WIS 3–10
Q2	8:43	OSU	Tyler Durbin 40-yard field goal	WIS 6–10
Q2	2:47	WIS	Andrew Endicott 32-yard field goal	WIS 6–13
Q2	:14	WIS	Andrew Endicott 22-yard field goal	WIS 6–16
Q3	2:52	OSU	J. T. Barrett 1-yard run (Tyler Durbin kick)	WIS 13–16
Q4	14:09	OSU	J. T. Barrett 8-yard run (Tyler Durbin kick)	OSU 20–16
Q4	7:54	WIS	Austin Ramesh 4-yard run (Andrew Endicott kick)	WIS 20–23
Q4	3:57	OSU	Tyler Durbin 31-yard field goal	TIE 23–23
OT		OSU	Noah Brown 7-yard pass from J. T. Barrett (Tyler Durbin kick)	OSU 30–23

The #2 Ohio State Buckeyes (6–0, 3–0) defeated the #8 Wisconsin Badgers (4–2, 1–2) in overtime, in a cross-divisional Big Ten match up on Oct. 15, at Camp Randall Stadium, by a score of 30–23. With both teams ranked in the top ten of both major college football polls, ESPN had chosen Madison, Wisconsin as the host of College GameDay. This was Wisconsin's second appearance on GameDay for 2016 and Ohio State's first. Ohio State extended their current win streak over the Badgers to five, dating back to 2011. Ohio State coach Urban Meyer is 4–0 versus Wisconsin and this was Badgers' coach Paul Chryst's first game against the Buckeyes.

The Buckeyes started the game off slow by gaining only 23 yards on their first two drives, both resulting in punts, while allowing 147 yards for the Badger's offense on their first two drives that resulted in a ten-point lead for #8 Wisconsin. Neither team could find the endzone for the remainder of the first half and both settled for two additional field goals apiece for a halftime score of 16–6 favoring the Badgers.

The Silver Bullet Buckeye defense came out strong in the second half forcing two Wisconsin turnovers and a three-and-out, on Wisconsin's first three possessions. Though the Buckeyes threw an interception on their first possession, they followed it up with two consecutive touchdowns, both J. T. Barrett runs. On Barrett's second touchdown, Ohio State took their first lead of the night at the 14:09 mark of the fourth quarter, and the Buckeyes led 20–16. The next drive, Wisconsin drove 81 yards to take back the lead with 7:54 left in the game. The Buckeyes followed that score with a field goal to tie the game at 23 with 3:57 to go. The Badger offense drove 25 yards on their last possession, but come up short of field goal range and had to punt to the Buckeyes with 0:14 left. The Buckeyes with the ball on their 17-yard line decided to run out the clock and force overtime.

Ohio State would get the ball first in overtime and would score a touchdown on a J. T. Barrett pass to Noah Brown on third and two from the Wisconsin 7, which gave them a 30–23 lead. On Wisconsin's attempt, quarterback Alex Hornibrook would throw a 21-yard pass on Wisconsin's second play which got the Badgers to the Ohio State 4. After two Corey Clement runs for no gain and an incomplete pass, the game came down to a fourth and goal from the Ohio State four. Wisconsin opted for a pass and Hornibrook was sacked by Tyquan Lewis to preserve Ohio State's unbeaten status.

The Buckeyes were led by Barrett who had 226 yards passing and 92 yards rushing and three total touchdowns (two rushing, one passing). Barrett was named Big Ten Co-offensive Player of the Week for his 318 total yard performance. He was also named Davey O’Brien National Quarterback of the Week. Wisconsin's quarterback Alex Hornibrook had 214 yards passing and one touchdown and running back Corey Clement gained 164 yards on 25 carries against the Buckeyes. Wisconsin Junior Linebacker Jack Cichy, who had 15 tackles, one sack and a forced fumble, was named Big Ten Defensive Player of the Week for his performance.

Ohio State stayed at #2 in both the AP and Coaches Polls and Wisconsin dropped two spots to #10 in the AP Poll and remained unchanged at #10 in the Coaches Poll. The Badgers would be the highest rated two-loss team.

Game Statistics

Statistic	OSU	WIS
Total yards	411	450
Passing yards	226	214
Rushing yards	185	236
Penalties	4–40	4–35
Turnovers	1	1
Time of Possession	28:32	31:28

Game Leaders

Statistic	OSU	WIS
Passing	J. T. Barrett (226)	Alex Hornibrook (214)
Rushing	J. T. Barrett (92)	Corey Clement (164)
Receiving	Curtis Samuel (58)	Troy Fumagalli (84)

=== At Penn State ===
Rivalry

Team	1	2	3	4	Total
#2 Ohio State	0	12	9	0	21
• Penn State	0	7	0	17	24

- Location:
  Beaver Stadium
  University Park, PA
- Game start: 8:00 p.m.
- Elapsed time: 3:25
- Game attendance: 107,280
- Game weather: Cold, windy, brisk
- Referee: Michael Cannon
- TV announcers (ABC): Chris Fowler, Kirk Herbstreit, Sam Ponder

Scoring summary
Q2	14:55	OSU	Tyler Durbin 33-yard field goal	OSU 3–0
Q2	4:53	OSU	Marcus Baugh 26-yard pass from J. T. Barrett (XP failed)	OSU 9–0
Q2	1:14	OSU	Tyler Durbin 30-yard field goal	OSU 12–0
Q2	0:09	PSU	Chris Godwin 20-yard pass from Trace McSorley (Tyler Davis kick)	OSU 12–7
Q3	10:10	OSU	Curtis Samuel 74-yard run (Tyler Durbin kick)	OSU 19–7
Q3	8:31	OSU	Team safety (PSU fumble recovered in end zone)	OSU 21–7
Q4	13:32	PSU	Trace McSorley 2-yard run (Tyler Davis kick)	OSU 21–14
Q4	9:33	PSU	Tyler Davis 34-yard field goal	OSU 21–17
Q4	4:27	PSU	Grant Haley 60-yard run from blocked OSU field goal (Tyler Davis kick)	PSU 24–21

Despite being 20-point favorites, the #2 Ohio State Buckeyes (6–1, 3–1) lost to their inter-divisional rival, the Penn State Nittany Lions (5–2, 3–1), at Beaver Stadium in University Park, Pennsylvania on October 22, at 8 p.m. on ABC. After the Ohio State special teams blocked a field goal on Penn State's opening drive, the Buckeyes score 12 unanswered points through two field goals and a J. T. Barrett to Marcus Baugh touchdown. Penn State finished the first half on a 20-yard touchdown pass with only nine seconds remaining in the first half, to give the Buckeyes a 12–7 lead at the half.

Ohio State scored a 74-yard Curtis Samuel Rushing touchdown on their second possession of the third quarter and followed it up with a safety when Penn State's punt team fumbled the ball into the endzone. Ohio State would not score anymore following that touchdown. Penn State went on to score a touchdown and also a field goal following a blocked punt. Making the score 21–17, Ohio State. With 4:27 left in the game, Ohio State ran out their field goal team to attempt a 43-yard field goal to go up by seven, but the kick was blocked and returned 60 yards to give Penn State a 24–21 lead which was also the final score.

This was Urban Meyer's first loss to Penn State, making him 4–1 versus the Nittany Lions.

Game Statistics

Statistic	OSU	PSU
Total yards	413	276
Passing yards	245	154
Rushing yards	168	122
Penalties	8–45	1–5
Turnovers	0	1
Time of Possession	37:19	22:41

Game Leaders

Statistic	OSU	PSU
Passing	J. T. Barrett (245)	Trace McSorley (154)
Rushing	Curtis Samuel (71) Mike Weber (71)	Saquon Barkley (99)
Receiving	Curtis Samuel (68)	Mike Gesicki (46)

=== Northwestern ===
Team	1	2	3	4	Total
Northwestern	0	10	7	3	20
• #6 Ohio State	10	7	0	7	24

- Location:
  Ohio Stadium
  Columbus, OH
- Game start: 3:37 p.m.
- Elapsed time: 3:23
- Game attendance: 107,296
- Game weather: Mostly sunny
- Referee: Jerry McGinn
- TV announcers (ESPN): Dave Pasch (play-by-play), Greg McElroy (color analyst), Tom Luginbill (sidelines)

Scoring summary
Q1	10:34	OSU	Mike Weber 1 Yd Run (Tyler Durbin Kick)	OSU 7–0
Q1	6:36	OSU	Tyler Durbin 35 Yd Field Goal	OSU 10–0
Q2	14:51	NW	Clayton Thorson 1 Yd Run (Jack Mitchell Kick)	OSU 10–7
Q2	6:17	OSU	Mike Weber 23 Yd Run (Tyler Durbin Kick)	OSU 17–7
Q2	1:43	NW	Jack Mitchell 23 Yd Field Goal	OSU 17–10
Q3	3:49	NW	Garrett Dickerson 2 Yd pass from Clayton Thorson (Jack Mitchell Kick)	Tie 17–17
Q4	9:43	OSU	Curtis Samuel 3 Yd Run (Tyler Durbin Kick)	OSU 24–17
Q4	3:31	NW	Jack Mitchell 33 Yd Field Goal	OSU 24–20

The #6 Ohio State Buckeyes (7–1, 4–1) defeated the Northwestern Wildcats (4–4, 3–2) on October 29, in a cross-divisional match up by a score of 24–20. This was the first meeting for the teams since 2013 and the first meeting in Columbus since 2007. Ohio State extended their win streak over Northwestern to six, dating back to 2004.

The Buckeyes started off the game quickly by scoring ten unanswered points in the first quarter with a Mike Weber touchdown run and a 35-yard Tyler Durbin field goal following an Ohio State interception. The Wildcats inched closer by scoring at the 14:51 mark of the second quarter, but it was followed by another Weber touchdown run of 23 yards. With 1:23 left in the half, Northwestern made a 23-yard field goal to make the halftime score 17–10, Ohio State.

Northwestern kept the Buckeye offense in check during the third quarter allowing no scoring and their offense tied the game at 17 with 3:49 to go in the third quarter. Ohio State found the endzone once more with 9:43 to go on a Curtis Samuel 3-yard run giving the Buckeyes a 24–17 lead. The final score came on a 33-yard Northwestern field goal with 3:31 to go in the game.

Game Statistics

Statistic	OSU	NW
Total yards	431	406
Passing yards	223	258
Rushing yards	208	148
Penalties	2–10	2–20
Turnovers	0	1
Time of Possession	32:40	27:20

Game Leaders

Statistic	OSU	NW
Passing	J. T. Barrett (223)	Clayton Thorson (256)
Rushing	Mike Weber (87)	Justin Jackson (76)
Receiving	Curtis Samuel (68)	Austin Carr (158)

=== Nebraska ===
Team	1	2	3	4	Total
#10 Nebraska	3	0	0	0	3
• #6 Ohio State	14	17	24	7	62

- Location:
  Ohio Stadium
  Columbus, OH
- Game start: 8:00 p.m.
- Elapsed time: 3:30
- Game attendance: 108,750
- Game weather: Clear
- Referee: John O'Neill
- TV announcers (ABC): Chris Fowler, Kirk Herbstreit, Samantha Ponder

Scoring summary
Q1	13:26	OSU	Damon Webb 36-yard interception return (Tyler Durbin kick)	OSU 7–0
Q1	7:45	NEB	Drew Brown 20-yard field goal	OSU 7–3
Q1	3:16	OSU	Terry McLaurin 7-yard pass from J. T. Barrett (Tyler Durbin kick)	OSU 14–3
Q2	12:21	OSU	Mike Weber 23-yard run (Tyler Durbin kick)	OSU 21–3
Q2	8:22	OSU	Tyler Durbin 28-yard field goal	OSU 24–3
Q2	0:03	OSU	Curtis Samuel 1-yard pass from J. T. Barrett (Tyler Durbin kick)	OSU 31–3
Q3	14:48	OSU	Curtis Samuel 75-yard pass from J. T. Barrett (Tyler Durbin kick)	OSU 38–3
Q3	10:00	OSU	Noah Brown 6-yard pass from J. T. Barrett (Tyler Durbin kick)	OSU 45–3
Q3	1:35	OSU	Tyler Durbin 28-yard field goal	OSU 48–3
Q3	0:34	OSU	Malik Hooker 48-yard interception return (Tyler Durbin kick)	OSU 55–3
Q4	7:19	OSU	Joe Burrow 12-yard run (Tyler Durbin kick)	OSU 62–3

The #6 Ohio State Buckeyes (8–1, 5–1) defeated #9 Nebraska Cornhuskers (7–2, 4–2) at Ohio Stadium in front of the second largest crowd in Ohio Stadium history. This was the first match-up since 2012 and only the second since Nebraska joined the Big Ten Conference in 2011. Urban Meyer is 2–0 versus the Cornhuskers, winning the 2012 clash by a score of 63–38. Ohio State opened as 18-point favorites.

On Nebraska's first drive quarterback Tommy Armstrong Jr. threw an interception to Damon Webb, who returned the interception for a touchdown to give the Buckeyes an early 7–0 lead. The ensuing possession for the Cornhuskers would be a 15-play, 72-yard drive that would result in a 20-yard field goal, Nebraska's only points of the game. Ohio State would score three more touchdowns and a field goal in the first half to give the Buckeyes a 31–3 lead. With 6:03 left in the second quarter, Tommy Armstrong Jr. ran for 11-yards but was hit while going out-of-bounds causing him to hit his head and briefly knocked unconscious. He was carried off of the field on a stretcher and transported to Ohio State University Wexner Medical Center for evaluation. He was quickly released and made an appearance back in the stadium in the third quarter to chants of "Tommy! Tommy!" from the Ohio State student section.

Ohio State would receive the ball in the third quarter and would score on the opening play with a 75-yard pass from J. T. Barrett to Curtis Samuel. Ohio State's offense would score 17 more points in the game and defensive back Malik Hooker would record his second interception returned for a touchdown and fifth overall for the season. The Cornhuskers failed to stop the Buckeyes from scoring on all of their drives.

Curtis Samuel was named Big Ten Conference Co-offensive Player of the Week for his performance by gaining 173 all-purpose yards and two touchdowns.

Statistic	OSU	NEB
Total yards	590	204
Passing yards	352	126
Rushing yards	238	78
Penalties	4–35	4–43
Turnovers	1	2
Time of Possession	37:18	22:42

Statistic	OSU	NEB
Passing	J. T. Barrett (290)	Tommy Armstrong Jr. (74)
Rushing	Demario McCall (73)	Terrell Newby (54)
Receiving	Curtis Samuel (137)	Stanley Morgan Jr. (56)

=== At Maryland ===
Team	1	2	3	4	Total
• #6 Ohio State	21	24	10	7	62
Maryland	3	0	0	0	3

- Location:
  Maryland Stadium
  College Park, MD
- Game start: 3:30 p.m.
- Elapsed time: 3:45
- Game attendance: 48,090
- Game weather: Clear
- Referee: Dan Capron
- TV announcers (ESPN): Beth Mowins (play-by-play), Anthony Becht (color), Rocky Boiman (sideline)

Scoring summary
Q1	11:28	OSU	Curtis Samuel 2-yard run (Tyler Durbin kick)	OSU 7–0
Q1	9:29	OSU	J. T. Barrett 4-yard run (Tyler Durbin kick)	OSU 14–0
Q1	2:03	MD	Adam Greene 23-yard field goal	OSU 14–3
Q1	0:21	OSU	Curtis Samuel 36-yard pass from J. T. Barrett (Tyler Durbin kick)	OSU 21–3
Q2	11:08	OSU	J. T. Barrett 1-yard run (Tyler Durbin kick)	OSU 28–3
Q2	4:08	OSU	Curtis Samuel 5-yard run (Tyler Durbin kick)	OSU 35–3
Q2	2:10	OSU	Dontre Wilson 8-yard pass from J. T. Barrett (Tyler Durbin kick)	OSU 42–3
Q2	0:49	OSU	Tyler Durbin 45-yard field goal	OSU 45–3
Q3	12:22	OSU	Tyler Durbin 34-yard field goal	OSU 48–3
Q3	5:43	OSU	Demario McCall 3-yard run (Tyler Durbin kick)	OSU 55–3
Q4	9:30	OSU	Binjimen Victor 25-yard pass from Joe Burrow (Tyler Durbin kick)	OSU 62–3

The #6 Ohio State Buckeyes (9–1, 6–1) defeated the Maryland Terrapins (5–5, 2–5) 62–3 in a Big Ten East match-up. The game was played on Nov. 12, at 3:30 pm, in College Park, Maryland and was aired on ESPN. It was the third meeting between the teams with the Buckeyes being victorious in both previous games. The Buckeyes came in as 28-point favorites.

Ohio State came out of the gates quickly by scoring touchdowns on their first two offensive possessions while holding the Terrapins to −4 yards. Maryland mustered up a 23-yard field goal at the 2:03 mark of the first quarter and would not score the rest of the game. The Buckeyes would go on to score on five of their last six possessions of the first half and forcing two Maryland turnovers to close the half up 45–3.

The Buckeyes scored two more touchdowns and a field goal in the second half, while Maryland would not reach the Buckeye-side of the field.

Following a chaotic week in football, the Buckeyes would jump to #2 in both the AP and Coaches Polls following their second straight 59-point victory.

Statistics

Statistic	OSU	MD
Total yards	581	176
Passing yards	328	133
Rushing yards	253	43
Penalties	6–55	7–74
Turnovers	0	2
Time of Possession	31:45	28:15

Statistic	OSU	MD
Passing	J. T. Barrett (253)	Caleb Rowe (93)
Rushing	Mike Weber (93)	Ty Johnson (21)
Receiving	Curtis Samuel (74)	Teldrick Morgan (56)

=== At Michigan State ===
Team	1	2	3	4	Total
• No. 2 Ohio State	7	3	7	0	17
Michigan State	7	3	0	6	16

- Location:
  Spartan Stadium
  East Lansing, MI
- Game start: 12:00 p.m.
- Elapsed time: 3:35
- Game attendance: 73,303
- Game weather: Cold, snow showers
- Referee: Ron Snodgrass
- TV announcers (ESPN): Joe Tessitore (play-by-play), Todd Blackledge (color), Holly Rowe (sideline)

Scoring summary
Q1	14:14	MSU	L. J. Scott 64-yard pass from Tyler O'Connor (Michael Geiger kick)	MSU 7–0
Q1	7:56	OSU	Curtis Samuel 24-yard pass from J. T. Barrett (Tyler Durbin kick)	TIE 7–7
Q2	13:42	MSU	Michael Geiger 28-yard field goal	MSU 10–7
Q2	10:03	OSU	Tyler Durbin 39-yard field goal	TIE 10–10
Q3	5:33	OSU	Mike Weber 4-yard run (Tyler Durbin kick)	OSU 17–10
Q4	4:41	MSU	L. J. Scott 1-yard run (two-point pass conversion failed)	OSU 17–16

The No. 2 Ohio State Buckeyes (10–1, 7–1) defeated the Michigan State Spartans (3–8, 1–7), 17–16, in East Lansing, Michigan.

Michigan State received the opening kickoff and in two plays scored a 64-yard touchdown screen pass from Tyler O'Connor to L. J. Scott to give the Spartans a 7–0 advantage 46 seconds into the game. Following Ohio State and Michigan State trading punts, Ohio State evened the score on a 5-play, 50-yard drive, capped by a 24-yard J. T. Barrett pass to Curtis Samuel.

The Spartans opened the second quarter with a 28-yard field goal to give them a 3-point lead, but were tied once again by the Buckeyes on the following drive with a 39-yard field goal. Ohio State intercepted an O'Connor pass two plays later and drove the ball into the redzone. On third and three at the MSU 16, Mike Weber fumbled the ball giving Ohio State no chance to attempt a field goal. Ohio State and Michigan State went into halftime tied at ten.

Both teams punted twice to start the second half until Ohio State formed a four-play 69-yard drive that resulted in another touchdown, giving them a 17–10 advantage. The next score came from Michigan State on a 1-yard L. J. Scott run. The Spartans opted to go for a two-point conversion with only 4:41 left in the game to attempt to take the lead. Tyler O'Connor's pass was intercepted in the end zone and the Buckeyes maintained the lead, 17–16. Ohio State got the ball back and ran 2:37 off the clock on six plays, but punted with 2:04 left in the game. Tyler O'Connor was sacked on the first play by Tyquan Lewis for a loss of ten yards, the following play, Gareon Conley intercepted O'Connor's pass to seal the Buckeyes' 17–16 victory.

Mike Weber was named Big Ten Freshman of the Week for his performance and for the second time this season.

Statistics

Statistic	OSU	MSU
Total yards	310	334
Passing yards	86	127
Rushing yards	224	207
Penalties	4–40	6–60
Turnovers	1	2
Time of possession	30:53	29:07

Statistic	OSU	MSU
Passing	J. T. Barrett (86)	Tyler O'Connor (105)
Rushing	Mike Weber (111)	L. J. Scott (160)
Receiving	Curtis Samuel (40)	L. J. Scott (76)

=== Michigan ===
The Game

Team	1	2	3	4	OT	2OT	Total
#3 Michigan	0	10	7	0	7	3	27
• #2 Ohio State	0	7	7	3	7	6	30

- Location:
  Ohio Stadium
  Columbus, OH
- Game start: 12:00 p.m.
- Elapsed time: 3:51
- Game attendance: 110,045 (Ohio Stadium attendance record)
- Game weather: Partly cloudy, cold
- Referee: Dan Capron
- TV announcers (ABC): Chris Fowler (play-by-play), Kirk Herbstreit (color), Samantha Ponder (sideline), Tom Rinaldi (sideline)

Scoring summary
2	13:31	MICH	Kenny Allen 28-yard field goal	MICH 3–0
2	4:03	OSU	Malik Hooker 16-yard interception return (Durbin Tyler kick)	OSU 7–3
2	0:06	MICH	Khalid Hill 1-yard run (Kenny Allen kick)	MICH 10–7
3	6:37	MICH	Khalid Hill 8-yard pass from Wilton Speight (Kenny Allen kick)	MICH 17–7
4	0:01	OSU	Durbin Tyler 23-yard field goal	Tie 17–17
OT	0:00	OSU	J. T. Barrett 7-yard run (Tyler Durbin kick)	OSU 24–17
OT	0:00	MICH	Amara Darboh 5-yard pass from Wilton Speight (Kenny Allen kick)	Tie 24–24
2OT	0:00	MICH	Kenny Allen 37-yard field goal	MICH 27–24
2OT	0:00	OSU	Curtis Samuel 15-yard run	OSU 30–27

Overall record	Previous meeting	Previous winner
47–58–6	November 28, 2015	Ohio State, 42–13

Following its road game against Michigan State, Ohio State faced its arch-rivals, the Michigan Wolverines, in the 113th meeting of "The Game". In the previous meeting, Ohio State defeated Michigan for the fourth consecutive year, winning 42–13.

In this year's game, the #2 Ohio State Buckeyes (11–1, 8–1) defeated the #3 Michigan Wolverines (10–2, 7–2) by a score of 30–27 in double overtime. After neither team scored in the first quarter, Michigan opened the scoring in the second quarter via a 28-yard field goal from Kenny Allen. Ohio State responded with a 16-yard interception return from Malik Hooker. Michigan closed the scoring in the first half via a one-yard touchdown run from Khalid Hill, which made the score 10–7 in favor of Michigan at halftime. Michigan extended their lead in the third quarter via an eight-yard touchdown pass from Wilton Speight to Hill. Ohio State reduced Michigan's lead to three points via a one-yard touchdown run from Mike Weber, before Tyler Durbin recorded a 23-yard field goal as time expired in the fourth quarter to tie the game and force overtime. In overtime, Ohio State scored via a seven-yard touchdown run from J. T. Barrett. Michigan responded with a five-yard touchdown pass from Speight to Amara Darboh to force double overtime. In double overtime, Michigan scored via a 37-yard field goal from Allen. On a controversial 4th and 1 play, J.T Barrett ran up the middle and was tackled in such a way that the forward progress made it difficult to determine where the ball would be spotted. The result was ultimately that the officials gave Ohio State the first down. The next play, Curtis Samuel recorded a 15-yard touchdown run to win the game.

Dave Adolph served as honorary captain for both Michigan and Ohio State. The game marked the 11th time that Michigan and Ohio State took the field both in the nation's top-five rankings; and is just the second time that both programs were ranked in the nation's top three. The other was the No. 1 vs. No. 2 matchup in 2006 at Ohio Stadium. The game also marked the first overtime in the Michigan-Ohio State rivalry. Michigan's defense recorded a season-best eight sacks against Ohio State. It is the program's most since posting nine against Notre Dame on September 15, 2007. The Wolverines have recorded at least three sacks in each of the last four games. Wide receiver Amara Darboh surpassed the 2,000-yard receiving milestone in the contest. Darboh caught eight passes for 68 receiving yards, upping his career total to 2,026. Darboh has recorded a reception in 32 consecutive games, earning a share of the fourth spot among Michigan's all-time leaders in the category. He is tied with Marquise Walker (1998–2001).

Raekwon McMillan was named the conference Defensive Player of the Week for his performance. He recorded a career-tying 16 tackles, including seven solo stops.

Oddly, this game did not air on Pittsburgh ABC affiliate WTAE-TV's main signal, but rather, on ESPN2 and on the This TV digital subchannel the station had at the time. The main channel aired a game between the Pitt Panthers and Syracuse Orange instead.

Statistics

Statistic	OSU	MICH
Total yards	330	310
Passing yards	124	219
Rushing yards	206	91
Penalties	2–6	7–59
Turnovers	1	3
Time of Possession	28:47	31:13

Statistic	OSU	MICH
Passing	J. T. Barrett (124)	Wilton Speight (219)
Rushing	J. T. Barrett (125)	De'Veon Smith (60)
Receiving	Noah Brown (40)	Amara Darboh (68)

== CFP Playoff ==
=== Clemson (Fiesta Bowl – CFP Semifinal) ===
Fiesta Bowl (CFP Semifinal)

Team	1	2	3	4	Total
#3 Ohio State	0	0	0	0	0
• #2 Clemson	10	7	7	7	31

- Location:
  University of Phoenix Stadium
  Glendale, AZ
- Game start: 7:00 p.m.
- Elapsed time: 3:23
- Game attendance: 71,279
- Game weather: Indoors (dome)
- Referee: Land Clark
- TV announcers (ESPN): – Chris Fowler (play-by-play), Kirk Herbstreit (color), Samantha Ponder & Tom Rinaldi (sideline)

Overall record	Previous meeting	Previous winner
0–3	January 3, 2014	Clemson, 40–35

== Awards and honors ==
Weekly Awards
Player	Award	Date Awarded	Ref.
J. T. Barrett	Big Ten Offensive Player of the Week	September 5, 2016	
Marshon Lattimore	Walter Camp Defensive Player of the Week	September 11, 2016	
Noah Brown	Big Ten Offensive Player of the Week	September 19, 2016	
Jerome Baker	Big Ten Co-defensive Player of the Week	September 19, 2016	
Mike Weber	Big Ten Freshman of the Week	October 3, 2016	
J. T. Barrett	Big Ten Co-offensive Player of the Week	October 17, 2016	
Curtis Samuel	Co-Big Ten Offensive Player of the Week	November 7, 2016	
Mike Weber	Big Ten Freshman of the Week	November 21, 2016	
Raekwon McMillan	Big Ten Defensive Player of the Week	November 28, 2016	

Individual Yearly Awards
Player	Award/Honors
J. T. Barrett	Griese-Brees Quarterback of the Year (Big Ten); Chicago Tribune Silver Football Award Winner
Mike Weber	Thompson-Randle El Freshman of the Year (Big Ten); AP Big Ten Newcomer of the Year
Pat Elflein	Rimington-Pace Offensive Lineman of the Year (Big Ten); Rimington Trophy Winner; Outland Trophy Finalist
Tyquan Lewis	Smith-Brown Defensive Lineman of the Year (Big Ten)
Cameron Johnston	Eddleman-Fields Punter of the Year (Big Ten); Ray Guy Award Finalist
Joe Burger	Big Ten Sportsmanship Award
Sam Hubbard	Academic All-American (first team)
Curtis Samuel	Chicago Tribune Silver Football Finalist

All-Conference Honors
Player	Position	Media Vote	Coaches Vote	AP
J. T. Barrett	QB	1st Team	1st Team	1st Team
Curtis Samuel	WR	1st Team	1st Team	1st Team (WR); 2nd Team (A-P)
Pat Elflein	C	1st Team	1st Team	1st Team
Billy Price	G	1st Team	1st Team	1st Team
Tyquan Lewis	DL	1st Team	1st Team	1st Team
Raekwon McMillan	LB	1st Team	1st Team	1st Team
Malik Hooker	DB	1st Team	1st Team	1st Team
Cameron Johnston	P	1st Team	1st Team	1st Team
Marshon Lattimore	DB	2nd Team	1st Team	2nd Team
Mike Weber	RB	2nd Team	2nd Team	2nd Team
Jamarco Jones	OT	2nd Team	2nd Team	2nd Team
Gareon Conley	DB	2nd Team	3rd Team	–
Tyler Durbin	K	3rd Team	3rd Team	–
Parris Campbell	RS	3rd Team	HM	–
Jerome Baker	LB	HM	HM	–
Michael Hill	DL	HM	HM	–
Jalyn Holmes	DL	HM	HM	–
Sam Hubbard	DL	HM	HM	–
Marcus Baugh	TE	HM	HM	–
Damon Webb	DB	HM	–	–
Denzel Ward	DB	–	HM	–
Chris Worley	LB	–	HM	–

NCAA Recognized All-American Honors
Player	Position	AFCA	AP	FWAA	Sporting News	WCFF	Designation
Pat Elflein	C	1st Team	1st Team	1st Team	1st Team	1st Team	Unanimous
Malik Hooker	S	1st Team	1st Team	1st Team	1st Team	1st Team	Unanimous
Curtis Samuel	ATH	–	1st Team	2nd Team	1st Team	–	None
Billy Price	G	1st Team	2nd Team	-	2nd Team	2nd Team	None
Raekwon McMillan	LB	2nd Team	2nd Team	–	2nd Team	2nd Team	None
Cameron Johnston	P	–	2nd Team	–	–	2nd Team	None

*The NCAA and Ohio State only recognize the AP, AFCA, FWAA, Sporting News and WCFF All-American teams to determine if a player is a Consensus or Unanimous All-American. To be named a Consensus All-American, a player must be named first team in three polls and to be Unanimous, they must be named first team in all five.

Other All-American Honors
Player	Position	Athlon	CBS Sports	ESPN	FOX Sports	Phil Steele	SI	USA Today
Pat Elflein	C	1st Team	1st Team	1st Team	1st Team	1st Team	1st Team	1st Team
Malik Hooker	S	1st Team	1st Team	1st Team	1st Team	1st Team	1st Team	1st Team
Raekwon McMillan	LB	2nd Team	–	–	2nd Team	2nd Team	2nd Team	2nd Team
Billy Price	G	3rd Team	–	–	–	3rd Team	2nd Team	–
Cameron Johnston	P	3rd Team	–	–	3rd Team		–	2nd Team
Curtis Samuel	HB	1st Team	–	–	2nd Team	2nd Team	–	–
Nick Bosa	DE		–	1st Team (FR)	–		–	–
Mike Weber	RB		–	–	–		–	1st Team (FR)
