= Tyquan =

Tyquan is a masculine given name. Notable people with the name include:

- Tyquan Lewis (born 1995), American football defensive end
- Tyquan Thornton (born 2000), American football wide receiver
