= Cameron Johnston =

Australian-born American football player (born 1992)

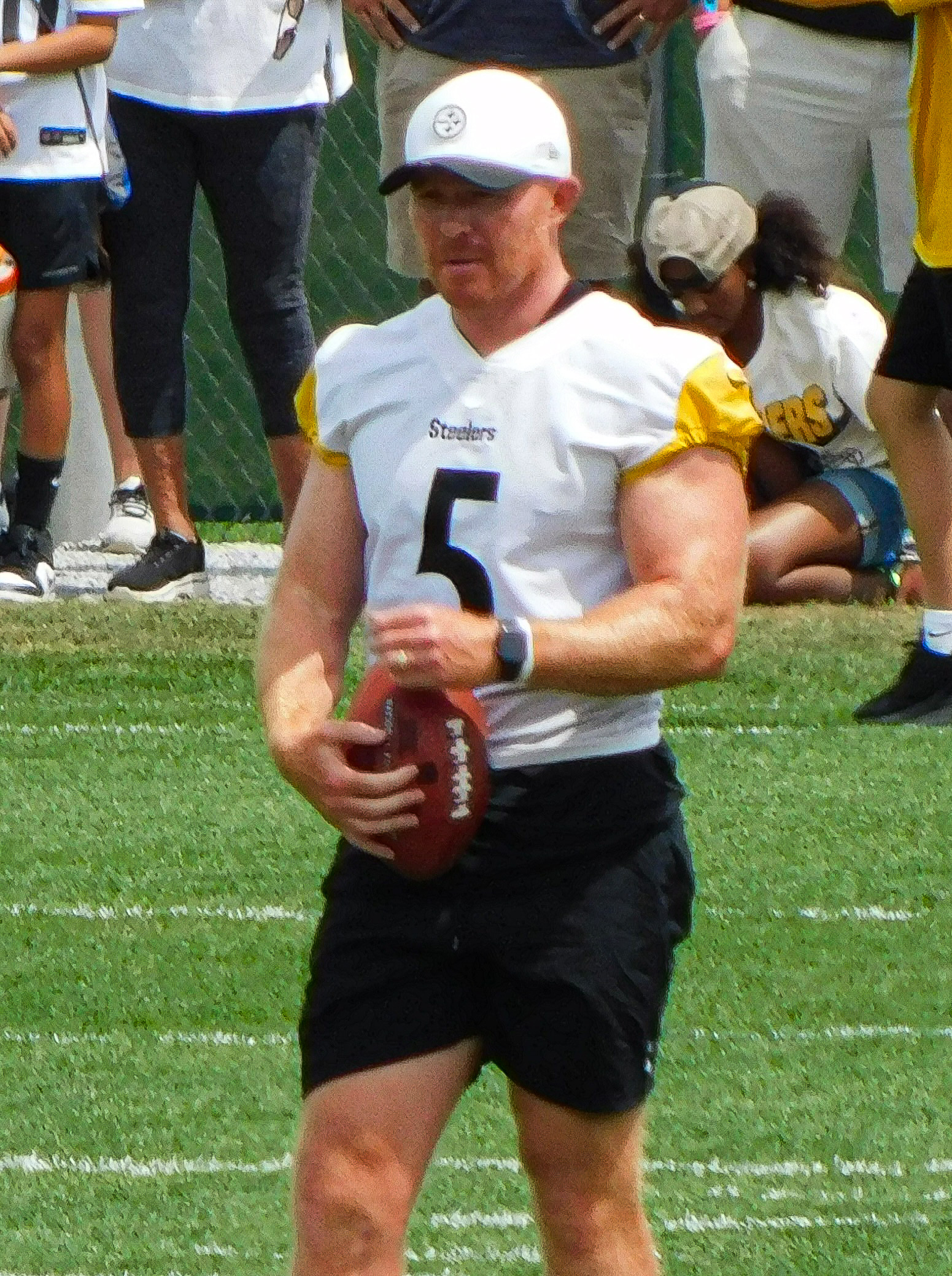
- Johnston with the Pittsburgh Steelers in 2025

No. 19 – Pittsburgh Steelers
- Position: Punter
- Roster status: Active

Personal information
- Born: 24 February 1992 (age 34); Geelong, Victoria, Australia
- Listed height: 5 ft 11 in (1.80 m)
- Listed weight: 194 lb (88 kg)

Career information
- High school: St Joseph's College (Newtown, Victoria)
- College: Ohio State (2013–2016)
- NFL draft: 2017: undrafted

Career history
- Philadelphia Eagles (2017–2020); Houston Texans (2021–2023); Pittsburgh Steelers (2024); Buffalo Bills (2025); New York Giants (2025); Pittsburgh Steelers (2026–present)

Awards and highlights
- NFL punting yards leader (2021); CFB national champion (2014); Big Ten Punter of the Year (2016); First-team All-Big Ten (2016); Second-team All-Big Ten (2015)

Career NFL statistics as of Week 10, 2026
- Punts: 495
- Punting yards: 23,398
- Punting average: 47.3
- Longest punt: 74
- Inside 20: 202
- Stats at Pro Football Reference

Cameron Johnston (born 24 February 1992) is an Australian professional American football punter for the Pittsburgh Steelers of the National Football League (NFL). He played college football for the Ohio State Buckeyes. He formerly played Australian rules football and was a member of the Melbourne Football Club in 2011. He has also played in the NFL for the Philadelphia Eagles, Houston Texans, and New York Giants.

== Early life and Australian rules career ==
Johnston is from Geelong, Victoria, Australia, and attended high school at St Joseph's College. He played for the Geelong Falcons in the under-18 TAC Cup before being drafted to the Melbourne Football Club with the 63rd selection in the 2011 AFL rookie draft. A midfielder, Johnston spent the 2011 season playing for the Casey Scorpions, Melbourne's affiliate team in the Victorian Football League (VFL). However, he managed only six games for Casey's senior team, instead spending most of the season in the VFL reserves (a third-tier competition). Johnston was delisted by Melbourne at the season's end.

== College career ==
After failing at his AFL ambitions, Johnston signed up with ProKick Australia in 2012, an academy headed by Nathan Chapman for Australian players looking to pursue a career in the United States. In 2013, he secured a full scholarship with Ohio State. As a freshman, Johnston led all Big Ten Conference punters with a 44.0 per punt average and ranked 16th-best nationally. He was named a second-team Freshman All-American by College Football News later that year. In his final three years at OSU, he was part of the 2014 national championship team, earned second and first-team honors in his junior and senior years respectively, and was named Eddleman-Fields Big Ten Punter of the Year. He also ranked academically in the Big Ten his final two years.

== NFL career ==
Pre-draft measurables
Height	Weight	Arm length	Hand span	Wingspan	40-yard dash	10-yard split	20-yard split
5 ft 11 in (1.80 m)	194 lb (88 kg)	31 in (0.79 m)	9 in (0.23 m)	6 ft 1 5/8 in (1.87 m)	4.92 s	1.74 s	2.85 s
All values from NFL Combine

=== Philadelphia Eagles ===
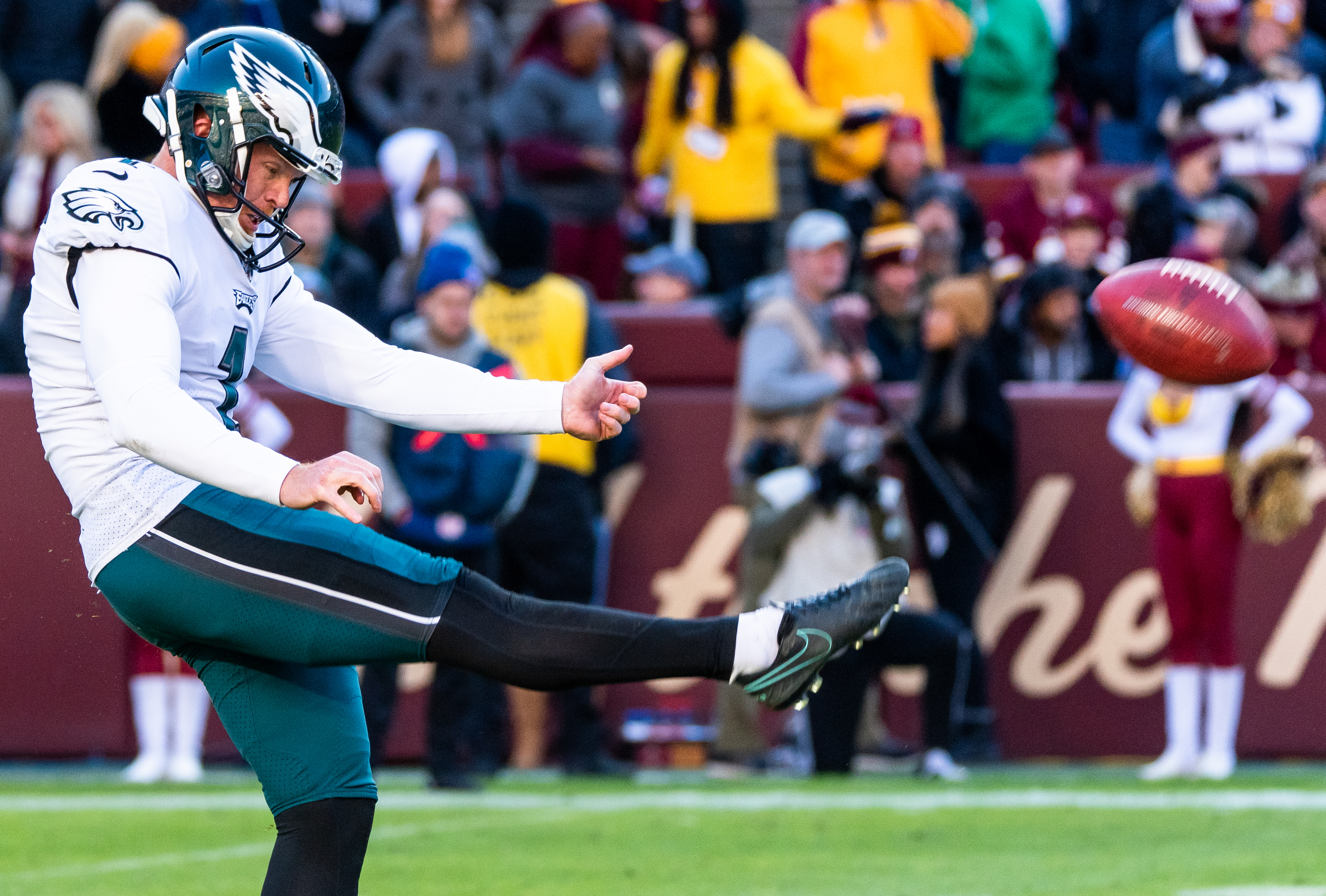
Johnston in a game against the Washington Redskins in 2019

Johnston signed with the Philadelphia Eagles as an undrafted free agent on 11 May 2017. He was waived on 2 September. Johnston signed a reserve/future contract with the Eagles on 3 January 2018.

On 1 September 2018, Johnston made the Eagles 53-man roster for the 2018 season. He made his NFL debut in the 2018 season opener against the Atlanta Falcons and had six punts for 313 net yards in the 18–12 victory. His first season as the team's starting punter ended with Johnston recording 61 total punts for 2,937 yards. His longest kick of the season was 68 yards and he punted within the 20 yard line 24 (39.34%).

The following season, Johnston punted 71 times for 3,292 yards.

On 24 March 2020, Johnston was re-signed to a one-year, $660,000 contract by the Eagles. In 2020, he punted for 3,318 yards, his highest with Philadelphia. He was not re-signed following the season.

=== Houston Texans ===
Johnston signed with the Houston Texans on 30 March 2021. He led the league in punting yards (4,108) and total punts (88) during the 2021 season.

On 25 August 2023, Johnston pulled a calf muscle. The Texans signed undrafted rookie Ty Zentner to handle punting duties while Johnston recovered. On 31 August, Johnston was placed on injured reserve. He was activated on 7 October.

=== Pittsburgh Steelers (first stint) ===
On 19 March 2024, Johnston signed a three-year, $9 million contract with the Pittsburgh Steelers. He suffered a season-ending knee injury in Week 1 and was placed on injured reserve on 10 September.

Johnston was released by the Steelers on 25 August 2025 after losing the starting punter job to Corliss Waitman.

=== Buffalo Bills ===
On 9 September 2025, Johnston signed with the Buffalo Bills, replacing Brad Robbins, who was released after week 1. Johnston notably drew two crucial "roughing the kicker" penalties that proved pivotal in the Bills' wins over the Miami Dolphins and New Orleans Saints in weeks 3 and 4, respectively, suffering an injury to his planting foot in the latter game. He was placed on injured reserve following the Saints game, with the Bills signing fellow Australian punter Mitch Wishnowsky to replace him. On 12 November, Johnston was released from injured reserve with an injury settlement.

=== New York Giants ===
On 10 December 2025, Johnston signed with the New York Giants' practice squad, amid an injury to Jamie Gillan. He was released by the Giants on December 22.

=== Pittsburgh Steelers (second stint) ===
Johnston (19) with kicker Chris Boswell (9) and long snapper Christian Kuntz (46) in 2026

On March 10, 2026, Johnston signed a one-year contract with the Pittsburgh Steelers.

== Career statistics ==
=== NFL ===
Legend
	Led the league
**Bold**	Career high

==== Regular season ====
Year	Team	GP	Punting						
Year	Team	GP	Punts	Yds	Lng	Avg	Blk	Ins20	RetY
2018	PHI	16	61	2,937	68	48.1	0	24	194
2019	PHI	16	71	3,292	61	46.4	0	28	207
2020	PHI	16	71	3,318	66	46.7	**1**	26	274
2021	HOU	**17**	**88**	4,108	69	46.7	0	**37**	355
2022	HOU	**17**	**88**	**4,229**	67	48.1	0	**37**	**405**
2023	HOU	13	66	3,145	**74**	47.7	0	30	189
2024	PIT	1	2	103	58	**51.5**	0	1	28
2025	BUF	3	7	308	48	44.0	0	2	43
2025	NYG	1	4	182	49	45.5	0	0	91
2026	PIT	9	37	1,776	62	48.0	0	17	137
Career		109	495	23,398	74	47.3	1	202	1,923

==== Postseason ====
Year	Team	GP	Punting						
Year	Team	GP	Punts	Yds	Lng	Avg	Blk	Ins20	RetY
2018	PHI	**2**	**10**	**467**	**54**	**46.7**	0	0	0
2019	PHI	1	3	136	46	45.3	0	0	0
2023	HOU	**2**	9	401	**54**	44.6	0	**5**	**13**
Career		4	22	1,004	54	45.6	0	5	13

=== College ===
Year	Team	GP	Punting				
Year	Team	GP	Pnt	Yds	Y/P	Lng	Blck
2013	Ohio State	13	49	2,156	44.0	71	0
2014	Ohio State	15	48	2,164	45.1	73	0
2015	Ohio State	13	58	2,549	43.9	67	1
2016	Ohio State	13	56	2,614	46.7	70	0
Career		54	211	9,483	44.9	73	1

== See also ==
- List of players who have converted from one football code to another
