= 2016 All-Big Ten Conference football team =

American college football all-star team

The 2016 All-Big Ten Conference football team consists of American football players chosen as All-Big Ten Conference players for the 2016 Big Ten Conference football season. The conference recognizes two official All-Big Ten selectors: (1) the Big Ten conference coaches selected separate offensive and defensive units and named first-, second- and third-team players (the "Coaches" team); and (2) a panel of sports writers and broadcasters covering the Big Ten also selected offensive and defensive units and named first-, second- and third-team players (the "Media" team).

== Offensive selections ==
=== Quarterbacks ===
- J. T. Barrett, Ohio State (Coaches-1; Media-1)
- Trace McSorley, Penn State (Coaches-2; Media-2)
- Wilton Speight, Michigan (Coaches-3; Media-3)

=== Running backs ===
- Saquon Barkley, Penn State (Coaches-1; Media-1)
- Corey Clement, Wisconsin (Coaches-1; Media-2)
- Justin Jackson, Northwestern (Coaches-2; Media-1)
- Mike Weber, Ohio State (Coaches-2; Media-2)
- Akrum Wadley, Iowa (Coaches-3)
- Rodney Smith, Minnesota (Coaches-3; Media-3)
- L. J. Scott, Michigan State (Media-3)

=== Wide receivers ===
- Austin Carr, Northwestern (Coaches-1; Media-1)
- Curtis Samuel, Ohio State (Coaches-1; Media-1)
- Amara Darboh, Michigan (Coaches-2; Media-2)
- R. J. Shelton, Michigan State (Coaches-2)
- DeAngelo Yancey, Purdue (Coaches-3; Media-2)
- Jordan Westerkamp, Nebraska (Coaches-3; Media-3)
- Drew Wolitarsky, Minnesota (Media-3)
- Chris Godwin, Penn State (Media-3)

=== Centers ===
- Pat Elflein, Ohio State (Coaches-1, Media-1)
- Mason Cole, Michigan (Coaches-2, Media-2)
- Sean Welsh, Iowa (Coaches-3; Media-3)

=== Guards ===
- Dan Feeney, Indiana (Coaches-1; Media-1)
- Billy Price, Ohio State (Coaches-1; Media-1)
- Kyle Kalis, Michigan (Coaches-2; Media-2)
- Beau Benzschawel, Wisconsin (Coaches-2; Media-3)
- Brian Allen, Michigan State (Coaches-3; Media-2)
- James Daniels, Iowa (Coaches-3; Media-3)

=== Tackles ===
- Erik Magnuson, Michigan (Coaches-1; Media-1)
- Ryan Ramczyk, Wisconsin (Coaches-1; Media-1)
- Ben Braden, Michigan (Coaches-2; Media-2)
- Jamarco Jones, Ohio State (Coaches-2; Media-2)
- Cole Croston, Iowa (Coaches-3)
- Jonah Pirsig, Minnesota (Coaches-3; Media-3)
- Nick Gates, Nebraska (Media-3)

=== Tight ends ===
- Jake Butt, Michigan (Coaches-1; Media-1)
- Troy Fumagalli, Wisconsin (Coaches-2; Media-3)
- Mike Gesicki, Penn State (Coaches-2)
- Josiah Price, Michigan State (Media-3)

== Defensive selections ==
=== Defensive linemen ===
- Taco Charlton, Michigan (Coaches-1; Media-1)
- Tyquan Lewis, Ohio State (Coaches-1; Media-1)
- Jaleel Johnson, Iowa (Coaches-1; Media-2)
- Chris Wormley, Michigan (Coaches-1; Media-2)
- Carroll Phillips, Illinois (Media-1)
- Ifeadi Odenigbo, Northwestern (Coaches-2; Media-1)
- Ryan Glasgow, Michigan (Coaches-2; Media-2)
- Malik McDowell, Michigan State (Coaches-2; Media-2)
- Garrett Sickels, Penn State (Coaches-2; Media-3)
- Dawuane Smoot, Illinois (Coaches-3; Media-3)
- Steven Richardson, Minnesota (Coaches-3; Media-3)
- Evan Schwan, Penn State (Coaches-3; Media-3)
- Conor Sheehy, Wisconsin (Media-3)

=== Linebackers ===
- Jabrill Peppers, Michigan (Coaches-1; Media-1)
- T. J. Watt, Wisconsin (Coaches-1; Media-1)
- Raekwon McMillan, Ohio State (Coaches-1; Media-1)
- Josey Jewell, Iowa (Coaches-2; Media-2)
- Anthony Walker, Jr., Northwestern (Coaches-2; Media-3)
- Vince Biegel, Wisconsin (Coaches-2; Media-3)
- Tegray Scales, Indiana (Coaches-3; Media-2)
- Ben Gedeon, Michigan (Coaches-3; Media-2)
- Riley Bullough, Michigan State (Coaches-3; Media-3)
- Jason Cabinda, Penn State (Coaches-3)

=== Defensive backs ===
- Desmond King, Iowa (Coaches-1; Media-1)
- Jourdan Lewis, Michigan (Coaches-1; Media-1)
- Malik Hooker, Ohio State (Coaches-1; Media-1)
- Marshon Lattimore, Ohio State (Coaches-1; Media-2)
- Sojourn Shelton, Wisconsin (Coaches-2; Media-1)
- Lano Hill, Michigan (Coaches-2)
- Channing Stribling, Michigan (Coaches-2; Media-2)
- Godwin Igwebuike, Northwestern (Coaches-2; Media-3)
- Gareon Conley, Ohio State (Coaches-2; Media-3)
- Rashard Fant, Indiana (Coaches-3; Media-2)
- Nathan Gerry, Nebraska (Coaches-3; Media-2)
- Marcus Allen, Penn State (Coaches-3)
- D'Cota Dixon, Wisconsin (Media-3)
- Leo Musso, Wisconsin (Media-3)

== Special teams ==
=== Kickers ===
- Tyler Davis, Penn State (Coaches-1; Media-2)
- Emmit Carpenter, Minnesota (Coaches-2; Media-1)
- Tyler Durbin, Ohio State (Coaches-3; Media-3)

=== Punters ===
- Cameron Johnston, Ohio State (Coaches-1; Media-1)
- Kenny Allen, Michigan (Coaches-2; Media-2)
- Ron Coluzzi, Iowa (Coaches-3; Media-3)

=== Return specialist ===
- Jabrill Peppers, Michigan (Coaches-1; Media-1)
- Desmond King, Iowa (Coaches-2; Media-2)
- Parris Campbell, Ohio State (Coaches-3)
- Solomon Vault, Northwestern (Media-3)

== Key ==
Bold = Consensus first-team selection by both the coaches and media

Coaches = Selected by the Big Ten Conference coaches

Media = Selected by the conference media

== See also ==
- 2016 College Football All-America Team
