= Corey Clement =

American football player (born 1994)

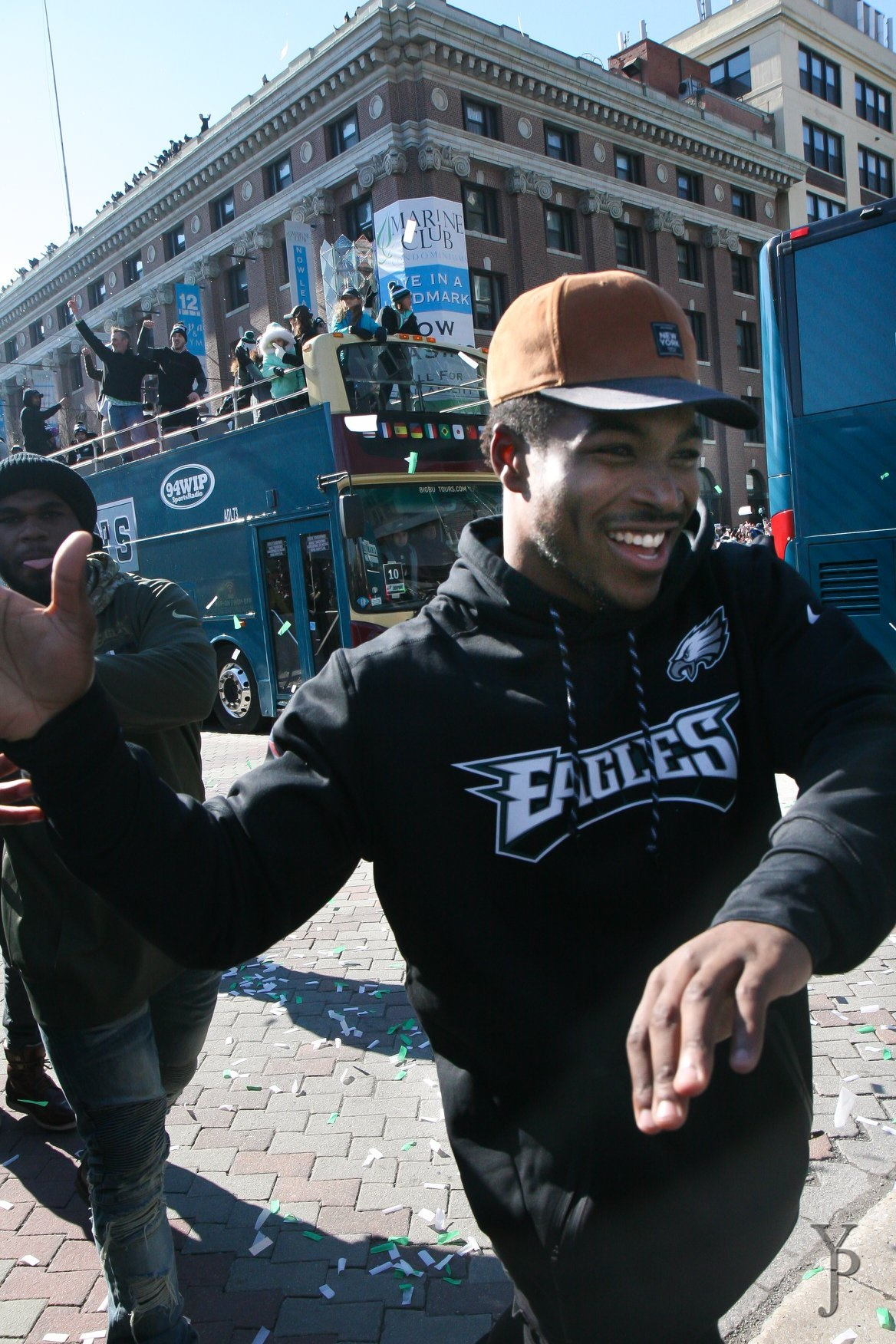
- Clement at the Philadelphia Eagles Super Bowl parade in 2018

No. 30, 32, 23, 24
- Position: Running back

Personal information
- Born: November 2, 1994 (age 32); Glassboro, New Jersey, U.S.
- Listed height: 5 ft 10 in (1.78 m)
- Listed weight: 220 lb (100 kg)

Career information
- High school: Glassboro
- College: Wisconsin (2013–2016)
- NFL draft: 2017: undrafted

Career history
- Philadelphia Eagles (2017–2020); New York Giants (2021)*; Dallas Cowboys (2021); Baltimore Ravens (2022)*; Arizona Cardinals (2022–2023)
- * Offseason or practice squad member only

Awards and highlights
- Super Bowl champion (LII); Second-team All-Big Ten (2016)

Career NFL statistics
- Rushing yards: 850
- Rushing average: 4.0
- Receptions: 48
- Receiving yards: 423
- Return yards: 692
- Total touchdowns: 11
- Stats at Pro Football Reference

Corey Joel Clement (born November 2, 1994) is an American former professional football player who was a running back in the National Football League (NFL). He played college football for the Wisconsin Badgers, and was signed by the Philadelphia Eagles as an undrafted free agent in 2017. He won Super Bowl LII with the team his rookie season, catching a touchdown in the game and helping execute the Philly Special.

== Early life ==
Clement attended Glassboro High School in Glassboro, New Jersey. During his career, he rushed for 6,245 yards, 34 rushing touchdowns and 90 total touchdowns for the Bulldogs. In track & field, Clement posted a time of 11.76 seconds in the 100-meter dash as a senior. He was ranked by Rivals.com as a four star recruit and the 17th best running back in his class. He originally committed to the University of Pittsburgh to play college football but changed to the University of Wisconsin–Madison.

== College career ==
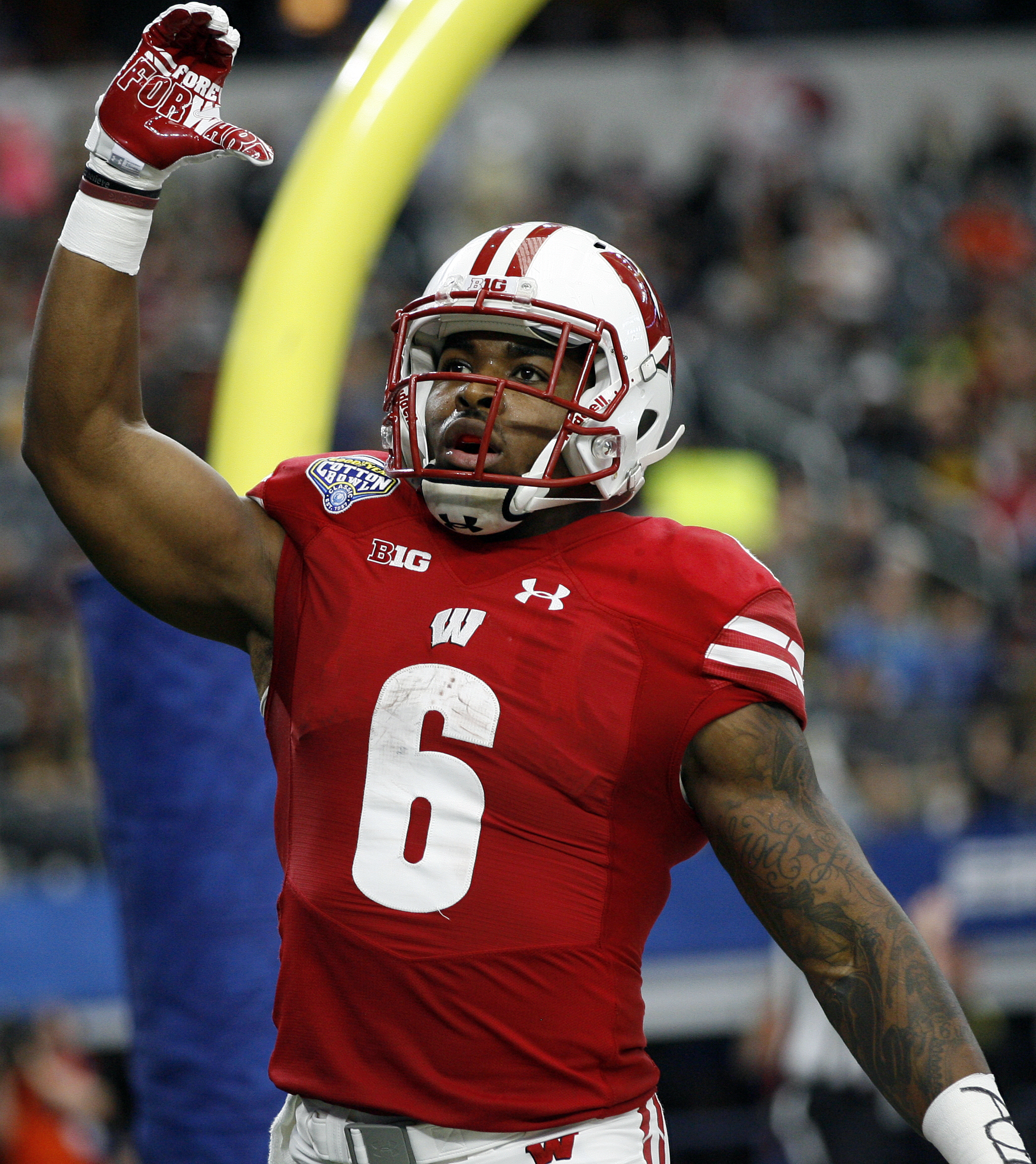
Clement with the Wisconsin Badgers in 2017

Clement attended and played college football at the University of Wisconsin from 2013–2016.

Clement played in 12 games as a true freshman. As a backup to James White and Melvin Gordon during the 2013 season, he rushed for 547 yards on 67 carries with seven touchdowns. As a sophomore in 2014, he again was the backup to Gordon. Behind Gordon in 2014, Clement had 147 carries for 949 rushing yards and nine touchdowns; 14 receptions for 119 receiving yards and two touchdowns.

The 2015 season was the first year where Clement was Wisconsin's featured running back after Gordon elected to declare for the 2015 NFL draft following his redshirt junior season. Just prior to the first game of the season against Alabama in Dallas, Clement injured his groin. Throughout the game against Alabama, Clement was sparingly used, with 8 carries for 16 yards and 2 receptions for 19 yards. He missed the next two games, against Miami (OH) and Troy, with the groin injury before it was announced that he would miss a further four to six weeks after he would receive a sports hernia surgery. He was projected to be able to play in the last three games of the regular season with his first game back being November 7 against Maryland. In late September, Clement traveled to Munich, Germany, for his sports hernia surgery, which would be performed by renowned specialist Ulrike Muschaweck. In limited action, he had 221 rushing yards and five rushing touchdowns in four games in the 2015 season.

The 2016 season was the best of Clement's collegiate career statistically. In the first three games, against LSU, Akron, and Michigan State, he totaled 251 rushing yards and five rushing touchdowns. On October 15, against Ohio State, he had 164 rushing yards, and one week later, he had 134 rushing yards and a touchdown against Iowa. On November 12, against Illinois, he had 123 rushing yards and three rushing touchdowns. In the Big Ten Conference Championship game against Penn State, he had 164 rushing yards and a touchdown in the 38–31 loss. Overall, he finished his final collegiate season with 1,375 rushing yards, 15 rushing touchdowns, 12 receptions, and 132 receiving yards. At the end of the season Clement was awarded first-team All-Big Ten honors by the coaches, and a second-team All-Big Ten honor by the media.

=== College statistics ===
Year	Team	GP	Rushing					Receiving		
Year	Team	GP	Att	Yards	Avg	TDs	Avg/G	Rec	Yards	TDs
2013	Wisconsin	11	67	547	8.2	7	50.0	1	9	0
2014	Wisconsin	14	147	949	6.5	9	67.8	14	119	2
2015	Wisconsin	4	48	221	4.6	5	55.3	2	19	0
2016	Wisconsin	13	314	1,375	4.4	15	105.8	12	132	0
Total		42	576	3,092	5.4	36	73.6	29	279	2

=== College awards/honors ===
2016 season

- First-team All-Big Ten (coaches)
- Second-team All-Big Ten (media)

2014 season

- 1× Big Ten Offensive Player of the Week (Week 10 - 2014)

2013 season

- 2nd Team All-Big Ten consensus (2013)
- 2× Big Ten Freshman Player of the Week (Weeks 2, 12 - 2013)

== Professional career ==
Pre-draft measurables
Height	Weight	Arm length	Hand span	Wingspan	40-yard dash	10-yard split	20-yard split	20-yard shuttle	Three-cone drill	Vertical jump	Broad jump	Bench press	Wonderlic
5 ft 10 1/8 in (1.78 m)	220 lb (100 kg)	30 1/2 in (0.77 m)	9 3/4 in (0.25 m)	6 ft 0 3/4 in (1.85 m)	4.59 s	1.64 s	2.66 s	4.17 s	6.71 s	32.0 in (0.81 m)	10 ft 0 in (3.05 m)	19 reps	20
All values from NFL Combine/Pro Day

=== Philadelphia Eagles ===
==== 2017 season: Super Bowl LII ====
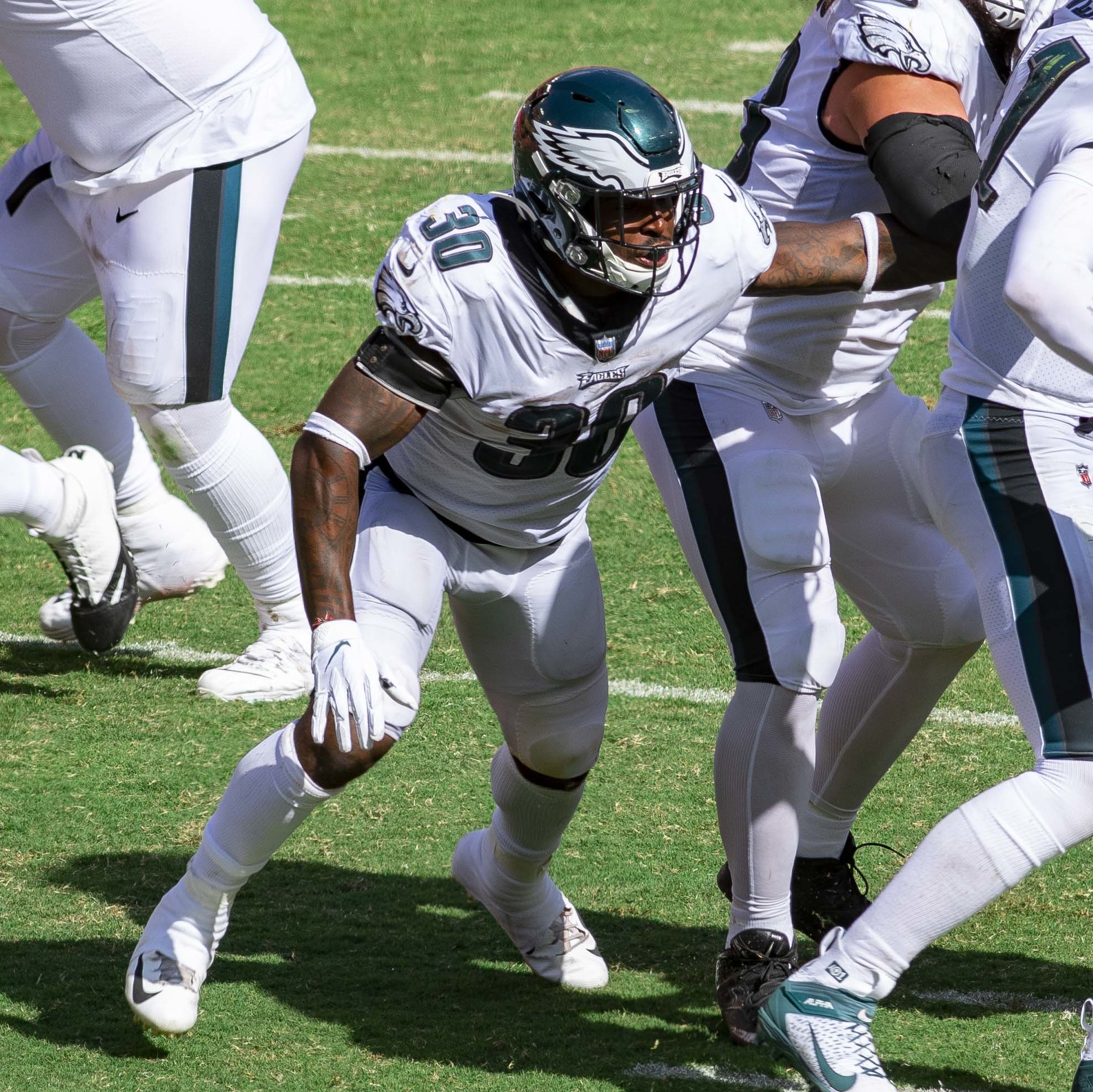
Clement, signed by the Eagles in 2017 as an undrafted free agent, spent his first four seasons in Philadelphia.

On May 11, 2017, Clement signed with the Philadelphia Eagles as an undrafted free agent. He was active in his first NFL game against the Washington Redskins on September 10, 2017. On September 24, 2017, Clement scored his first NFL touchdown against the New York Giants on a 15-yard run. In Week 9, against the Denver Broncos, Clement had a breakout day with 12 rushes for 51 yards, two rushing touchdowns, and a 15-yard touchdown reception. Overall, he finished his rookie season with 321 rushing yards, four rushing touchdowns, 10 receptions, 123 receiving yards, and two receiving touchdowns.

The Philadelphia Eagles finished with a 13–3 record and earned a first-round bye. In the Divisional Round against the Atlanta Falcons, he had 31 receiving yards in the 15–10 victory. In the National Football Conference Championship against the Minnesota Vikings, he had 20 rushing yards in the 38–7 victory. During Super Bowl LII against the New England Patriots, Clement finished with three carries for eight rushing yards and four receptions for 100 receiving yards and one receiving touchdown as the Eagles won 41–33, giving them their first Super Bowl win in franchise history. He took the snap of the Philly Special which he pitched to Trey Burton, who in turn threw a touchdown pass to quarterback Nick Foles.

==== 2018 season ====
Clement returned to the Eagles in the 2018 season to a very crowded backfield. He scored his first touchdown of the 2018 season in Week 2 against the Tampa Bay Buccaneers. He was placed on injured reserve on December 11, 2018, after suffering a knee injury in Week 14. He finished the 2018 season with 259 rushing yards and two rushing touchdowns.

==== 2019 season ====
Clement played mostly on special teams in the first four games of the 2019 season before he was placed on injured reserve with a shoulder injury on October 11, 2019. The Eagles chose not to place a restricted free agent tender on Clement following the 2019 season, and he became a free agent on March 18, 2020.

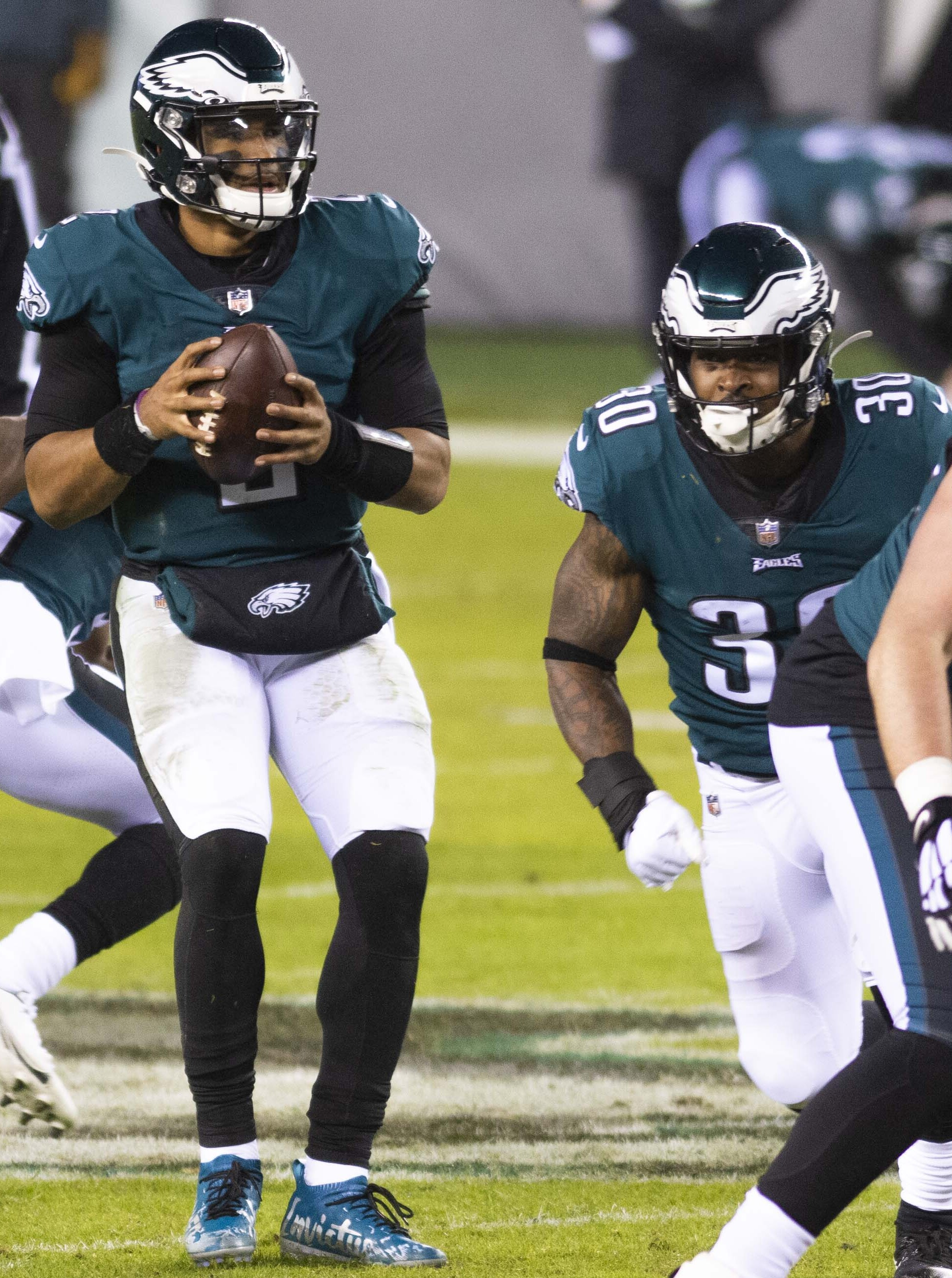
Clement (right) with Jalen Hurts in January 2021

==== 2020 season ====
Despite not being tendered by the Eagles as a restricted free agent, on April 29, 2020, he re-signed with the team on a one-year deal. He was placed on the reserve/COVID-19 list by the team on November 19, 2020, and activated on November 27.

=== New York Giants ===
On May 16, 2021, Clement signed with the Giants. He was released on August 31, 2021.

=== Dallas Cowboys ===
On September 1, 2021, Clement signed with the Dallas Cowboys. He appeared in all 17 games for the Cowboys. He played a majority of his time on special teams. He recorded 33 carries for 140 rushing yards, 6 receptions for 29 receiving yards, one receiving touchdown, 4 special teams tackles and one blocked punt.

=== Baltimore Ravens ===
On July 26, 2022, Clement signed with the Baltimore Ravens. He was released on August 15, 2022.

=== Arizona Cardinals ===
On October 12, 2022, Clement signed to the practice squad of the Arizona Cardinals practice squad. He was promoted to the active roster on November 19. Clement was the Cardinals' starting running back in Week 18 against the San Francisco 49ers, relieving the injured James Conner. In the contest, he rushed 8 times for 23 yards and a touchdown, as well as recording 3 catches for 25 receiving yards.

Clement agreed to a one-year contract extension on March 14, 2023. He was released on August 29, 2023, and re-signed to the practice squad. His contract expired when the team's season ended January 7, 2024.

== NFL career statistics ==
Legend
**Bold**	Career high

Year	Team	Games		Rushing					Receiving						Returning					Fumbles	
Year	Team	GP	GS	Att	Yds	Avg	Lng	TD	Tgt	Rec	Yds	Avg	Lng	TD	Ret	Yds	Avg	Lng	TD	Fum	Lost
2017	PHI	16	0	**74**	**321**	**4.3**	28	**4**	15	10	123	**12.3**	**28**	**2**	2	49	24.5	35	0	0	0
2018	PHI	11	0	68	259	3.8	32	2	**25**	**22**	**192**	8.7	23	0	**13**	**333**	**25.6**	**48**	0	**4**	0
2019	PHI	4	0	—	—	—	—	—	—	—	—	—	—	—	3	73	24.3	26	0	2	**2**
2020	PHI	15	0	21	75	3.6	7	1	6	5	25	5	12	0	1	22	22	22	0	0	0
2021	DAL	17	0	33	140	4.2	**38**	0	7	6	29	4.8	8	1	11	215	19.5	29	0	0	0
2022	ARI	9	1	15	55	3.7	12	1	7	5	54	10.8	21	0	—	—	—	—	—	0	0
2023	ARI	3	0	—	—	—	—	0	—	—	—	—	—	0	—	—	—	—	—	0	0
Career		75	1	211	850	4	38	8	60	48	423	8.8	28	3	30	692	23.1	48	0	6	2

=== Postseason ===
Year	Team	Games		Rushing					Receiving						Returning					Fumbles	
Year	Team	GP	GS	Att	Yds	Avg	Lng	TD	Tgt	Rec	Yds	Avg	Lng	TD	Ret	Yds	Avg	Lng	TD	Fum	Lost
2017	PHI	3	0	6	33	5.5	14	0	11	10	139	13.9	55	1	2	47	23.5	25	0	0	0
2021	DAL	1	0	—	—	—	—	—	—	—	—	—	—	—	—	—	—	—	—	—	—
Career		4	0	6	33	5.5	14	0	11	10	139	13.9	55	1	2	47	23.5	25	0	0	0
