= Pat Elflein =

American football player (born 1994)

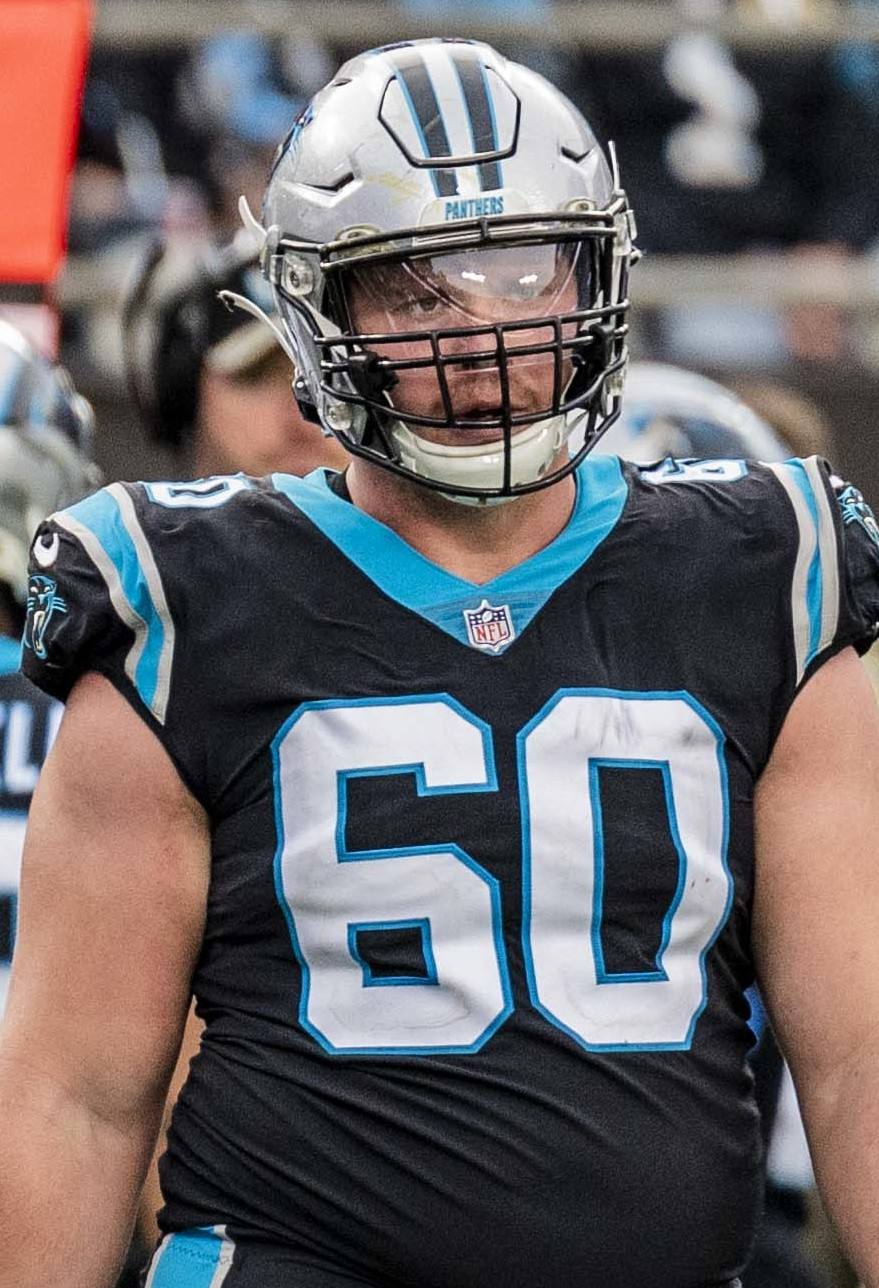
- Elflein with the Carolina Panthers in 2021

Profile
- Position: Center

Personal information
- Born: July 6, 1994 (age 32); Pickerington, Ohio, U.S.
- Listed height: 6 ft 2 in (1.88 m)
- Listed weight: 303 lb (137 kg)

Career information
- High school: Pickerington North
- College: Ohio State (2012–2016)
- NFL draft: 2017: 3rd round, 70th overall pick

Career history
- Minnesota Vikings (2017–2020); New York Jets (2020); Carolina Panthers (2021–2022); Arizona Cardinals (2023); San Francisco 49ers (2024)*
- * Offseason or practice squad member only

Awards and highlights
- PFWA All-Rookie Team (2017); CFP national champion (2014); Rimington Trophy (2016); Jim Parker Trophy (2016); Unanimous All-American (2016); Second-team All-American (2015); Big Ten Offensive Lineman of the Year (2016); 3× First-team All-Big Ten (2014–2016)

Career NFL statistics
- Games played: 65
- Games started: 64
- Fumble recoveries: 1
- Stats at Pro Football Reference

Patrick Elflein (born July 6, 1994) is an American professional football center. He played college football for the Ohio State Buckeyes, winning the Rimington Trophy in 2016. Elflein was selected by the Minnesota Vikings in the third round of the 2017 NFL draft.

== Early life ==
Born in Pickerington, a suburb of Columbus, Ohio, Elflein attended Pickerington High School North. A four-year football letterman and a two-time football team captain, Elflein earned 12 letters in his high school career, four each in the sports of football, wrestling and track and field. He was named in football to All-Ohio Capital Conference, All-Central District and to the Dispatch's All-Metro teams. He was the 2011 wrestler of the year in the OCC as he qualified for both the state and national tournament. Elflein also excelled on the track and field team; as an eighth grader, he won a division title in the shot put, and his best throw was 50 ft 11 in (15.52 m).

Ranked as the No. 22 guard prospect in the nation by ESPN and No. 31 by Scout.com, Elflein didn't wrestle with his decision about which school to attend once he received a scholarship offer from the Ohio State University, committing on July 14, 2011. As a result, the Buckeyes' recruiting class secured two of the 2011 Associated Press (AP) first-team Division I all-state offensive linemen in Elflein and Jacoby Boren (from cross-town school Pickerington High School Central).

== College career ==
Elflein redshirted his first year at Ohio State in 2012 due to a foot injury. Elflein was one of only two starters returning in 2015 and served as a captain for the 2016 season, his senior season in which he won the Rimington Trophy and was a finalist for the Outland Trophy. He graduated with a communications degree and finished his career as a graduate student, and prior to receiving his degree, he earned three OSU Scholar-Athlete awards and one Academic All-Big Ten Conference honor. He was a first-team All-Big Ten in each of his final three seasons.

=== Freshman season (2013) ===
As a redshirt freshman in 2013, Elflein earned his first varsity letter playing in all 14 games as a reserve offensive lineman when Corey Linsley was the Buckeyes' senior center. On September 21, he played 57 snaps on offense in the Buckeyes' overwhelming win over Florida A&M and then had several series worth of offensive snaps against Penn State and Purdue before being called in to play three quarters against Michigan in week 12. His play against the Wolverines in the one-point win earned him the start in the Big Ten championship game against Michigan State.

=== Sophomore season (2014) ===
Elflein earned the first of his three first-team All-Big Ten seasons as a sophomore, starting all 15 games including the 2015 College Football Playoff National Championship. He opened the season at left guard and started the first three games there, but moved to right guard for the final 12 games, helping lead the Buckeyes to a Top 10 national ranking in rushing with just over 264 yards per game as he and his offensive line teammates paved the way for Ezekiel Elliott to become the first running back in school history to rush for 200 yards in consecutive games. The offense was outstanding all around, with school records for touchdowns (90), points scored (637), passing yards (3,707) and passing touchdowns (42) as well.

=== Junior season (2015) ===
In his junior campaign, Elflein started all 13 games at the right guard spot for a Buckeye squad that finished 12-1 and capped their season with a 44–28 win over Notre Dame in the Fiesta Bowl. He received second-team All-American status by the Associated Press (AP) and Sports Illustrated for his dominant play. He was also named first-team All-Big Ten Conference for the second consecutive year by the league's head coaches and also by the media as he helped pave the way for Ohio State to lead the Big Ten in rushing at 245.2 yards per game and finish second in the conference in scoring and third in total offense.

=== Senior season (2016) ===
Prior to his senior year in 2016, Elflein handled a position switch, moving from guard to the center position as a fifth-year senior, with aplomb, starting all 13 games for the Buckeyes. He ended up garnering the Rimington Trophy as the nation's top center and helping Ohio State make the College Football Playoff semifinals. Elflein also was one of three finalists for the Outland Trophy and won the Pace Big Ten Offensive Linemen of the Year. Elflein was named the Rimington–Pace Offensive Lineman of the Year and was a First Team All-Big Ten selection in 2016. Along with Malik Hooker, they became the first pair of Buckeye teammates to be named unanimous All-Americans in the same year since Orlando Pace and Eddie George back in 1995.

== Professional career ==
=== Pre-draft ===
Prior to his senior season, Elflein was regarded as one of the best guards in the country and a likely first-round selection. Following his senior season, in which he had transitioned to center, an NFC West scout declared to NFL.com: "In Elflein, you are getting a guy who will be great for your locker room and will get the rest of the offensive line on board. I think he could have the same fast impact on a team's running game that Zach Martin had with the Dallas Cowboys. Safe draft pick to me." During the pre-draft evaluations, Elflein was widely viewed as the best center in the class and was often compared to Corey Linsley, who was Elflein's teammate at Ohio State, and Cowboys' Pro Bowl center Travis Frederick.

External videos
- Elflein performing at the NFL Combine
- Elflein gets drafted by Minnesota

Pre-draft measurables
| Height | Weight | Arm length | Hand span | 40-yard dash | 10-yard split | 20-yard split | 20-yard shuttle | Three-cone drill | Vertical jump | Broad jump | Bench press | Wonderlic |
|---|---|---|---|---|---|---|---|---|---|---|---|---|
| 6 ft 2 5/8 in (1.90 m) | 303 lb (137 kg) | 33 1/4 in (0.84 m) | 9 3/4 in (0.25 m) | 5.32 s | 1.88 s | 3.08 s | 4.71 s | 7.94 s | 23.5 in (0.60 m) | 8 ft 3 in (2.51 m) | 22 reps | 21 |
All values are from NFL Combine

=== Minnesota Vikings ===
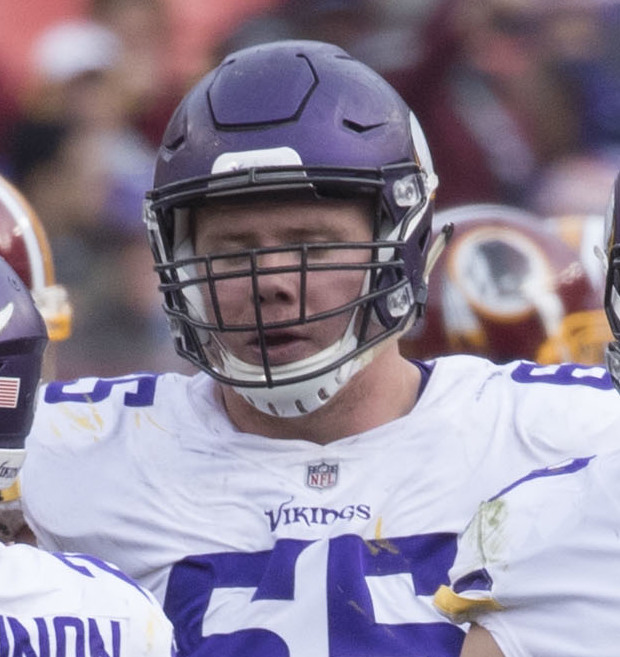
Elflein with the Vikings in 2017

Elflein was drafted by the Minnesota Vikings with the 70th overall pick in the third round of the 2017 NFL Draft. The Vikings traded up for the second time on Friday night, sending No. 79 and a fifth-round pick to the New York Jets in order to acquire the 70th overall selection. The day after the Draft, the Vikings announced Elflein would wear No. 65, the same number he wore at Ohio State.

"A doozy of a find in Round 3, and well worth trading up from No. 79 to get him. Elflein was the best center in this draft, and I think he can be Minnesota's man in the middle for years to come."

— Chris Burke, Sports Illustrated draft analyst

Elflein entered his rookie season as the Vikings starting center, starting 14 games and missing two due to a shoulder injury. Following an impressive rookie season, he was named to the PFWA All-Rookie Team.

After undergoing shoulder and ankle surgeries, Elflein missed the first three games of the 2018 season. He returned to the starting lineup in Week 4 at center, and remained there the rest of the season.

In 2019, Elflein was moved to left guard after the Vikings drafted Garrett Bradbury in the first round of the 2019 draft to play center.

In 2020, Elflein was moved over to right guard. He played one game for the Vikings before he suffered a thumb injury in practice and was placed on injured reserve on September 17, 2020. He was activated on November 13, but was waived the next day.

=== New York Jets ===
Elflein was claimed off waivers by the New York Jets on November 16, 2020. Elflein started the final six games of the season for the Jets at left guard after Alex Lewis was injured.

=== Carolina Panthers ===
On March 17, 2021, Elflein signed a three-year contract with the Carolina Panthers. He was named the Panthers starting left guard to start the season. He was placed on injured reserve on September 21, 2021, after suffering a hamstring injury in Week 2. He was activated on November 3, 2021.

Elflein was named the Panthers starting center for the 2022 season. He was placed on injured reserve on October 22, 2022, with a hip injury.

On March 14, 2023, Elflein was released by the Panthers.

=== Arizona Cardinals ===
On July 25, 2023, Elflein signed with the Arizona Cardinals. He was placed on injured reserve on August 28.

=== San Francisco 49ers ===
On August 2, 2024, the San Francisco 49ers signed Elfein to a one-year deal. However, Elflein suffered a calf injury in his first practice with the team and was placed on injured reserve on August 5. He was then released with an injury settlement four days later.
