= Tyquan Lewis =

American football player (born 1995)

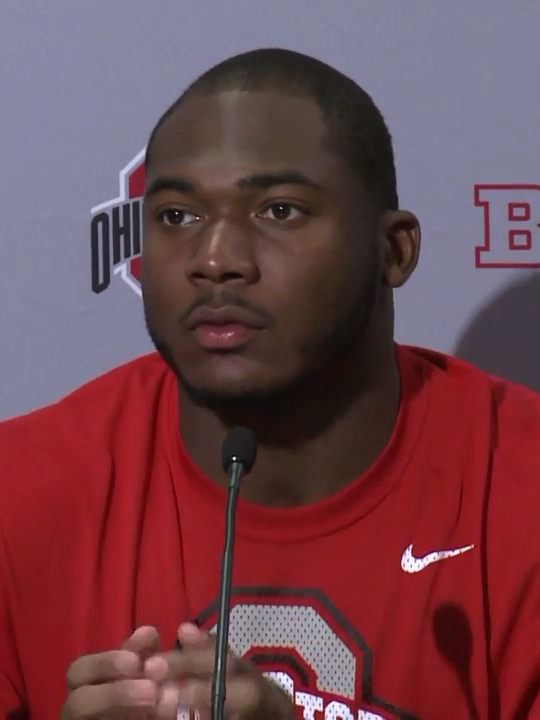
- Lewis in 2015

Profile
- Position: Defensive end

Personal information
- Born: January 30, 1995 (age 31); Tarboro, North Carolina, U.S.
- Listed height: 6 ft 3 in (1.91 m)
- Listed weight: 267 lb (121 kg)

Career information
- High school: Tarboro
- College: Ohio State (2013–2017)
- NFL draft: 2018: 2nd round, 64th overall pick

Career history
- Indianapolis Colts (2018–2025)

Awards and highlights
- CFP national champion (2014); Big Ten Defensive Lineman of the Year (2016); 2× First-team All-Big Ten (2016, 2017)

Career NFL statistics as of 2025
- Total tackles: 130
- Sacks: 18
- Forced fumbles: 2
- Pass deflections: 11
- Interceptions: 1
- Stats at Pro Football Reference

Tyquan Lewis (born January 30, 1995) is an American professional football defensive end. He played college football for the Ohio State Buckeyes, and was selected by the Colts in the second round of the 2018 NFL draft.

== Early life ==
Lewis played high school football for Tarboro High School in Tarboro, North Carolina, where he was part of multiple state championship teams. As a senior, he was named to the Associated Press' North Carolina all-football team. Coming out of high school, Lewis was rate a four-star prospect by major recruiting services. A member of the class of 2013, Lewis committed to Ohio State University on September 20, 2012. Lewis also had scholarship offers from schools such as Louisiana State University, the University of North Carolina, Virginia Tech, and Clemson University. He had to convince his mother of the merits of going to Ohio State; she was worried because of the far distance from North Carolina.

== College career ==
His redshirt freshman year at Ohio State, Lewis appeared in every game whether on defense or playing a small role on special teams. He recorded nine tackles on the season.

For his sophomore season, Lewis broke into the regular rotation and led the team in quarterback sacks with eight and finished second to teammate Joey Bosa in tackles for loss with fourteen. Lewis received a national championship ring as the Buckeyes won their eighth National Championship in the first College Football Playoff in January 2015. For his efforts, Lewis was named Honorable Mention on the 2015 All-Big Ten Conference football team. He played through the season with an injured labrum, which he had injured the previous spring, and had a surgical procedure to repair the muscle the following January.

Lewis continued his award-winning ways in 2016, as he racked up 7.5 sacks, sealed a win against Wisconsin, was named a captain, and won multiple accolades while developing into a leader off the field. He was named first-team 2016 All-Big Ten Conference football team and was the Big Ten Conference Defensive Lineman of the Year. In January 2017, Lewis announced that he would skip the 2017 NFL draft and return to OSU for his senior season.

Along with teammate J. T. Barrett, Lewis was named a Big Ten Preseason Honoree before his senior season. He later earned a spot on the first team of the 2017 All-Big Ten Conference football team. He also recorded 6.5 tackles for loss and five quarterback sacks. Lewis also tied the Ohio State football record for games played with 55. In the Senior Bowl, Lewis had one and a half sacks, including working with Ogbonnia Okoronkwo for a strip-sack.

== Professional career ==
On December 18, 2017, it was announced that Lewis had accepted his invitation to play in the 2018 Senior Bowl. On January 27, 2018, Lewis recorded four combined tackles and a sack as part of Denver Broncos' head coach Vance Joseph's North team that lost 45–16 to the South. Lewis attended the NFL Scouting Combine in Indianapolis, but was limited to the vertical jump and broad jump due to a bout with the flu. On March 22, 2018, Lewis participated at Ohio State's pro day and performed the majority of combine drills, but chose to skip the vertical jump. At the conclusion of the pre-draft process, Lewis was projected to be a third or fourth round pick by the majority of NFL draft experts and scouts. He was ranked the ninth best defensive end prospect in the draft by Scouts Inc. and was ranked the 12th best defensive end by DraftScout.com.

Pre-draft measurables
Height	Weight	Arm length	Hand span	40-yard dash	10-yard split	20-yard split	20-yard shuttle	Three-cone drill	Vertical jump	Broad jump	Bench press
6 ft 3 1/4 in (1.91 m)	269 lb (122 kg)	33 3/4 in (0.86 m)	10 3/8 in (0.26 m)	4.69 s	1.57 s	2.71 s	4.34 s	7.20 s	35.5 in (0.90 m)	10 ft 7 in (3.23 m)	24 reps
All values from NFL Combine/Ohio State's Pro Day

The Indianapolis Colts selected Lewis in the second round (64th overall) of the 2018 NFL draft. The Colts traded their third (67th overall) and sixth round (178th overall) picks to the Cleveland Browns and drafted Lewis with the second round pick they received in exchange.

On May 11, 2018, the Indianapolis Colts signed Lewis to a four-year, $4.36 million contract that includes a signing bonus of $1.25 million. He was placed on injured reserve on September 3, 2018, with a toe injury. He was activated off injured reserve on November 9, 2018.

In Week 8 of the 2020 season against the Detroit Lions, Lewis recorded two sacks on Matthew Stafford during the 41–21 win.

On November 1, 2021, Lewis was placed on injured reserve after suffering a season-ending knee injury in Week 8.

On March 16, 2022, Lewis signed a one-year, $3 million contract extension with the Colts. He suffered a ruptured patellar tendon in Week 8 and was placed on injured reserve on October 31, 2022.

On March 13, 2023, Lewis re-signed with the Colts. He played in all 17 games in 2023, recording 25 tackles and four sacks; he was also the team's 2023 recipient of the Ed Block Courage Award.

On March 11, 2024, the Colts signed Lewis to a two-year contract extension.

== Personal life ==
Lewis has four brothers and a sister.
