= J. T. Barrett =

American football player and coach (born 1995)

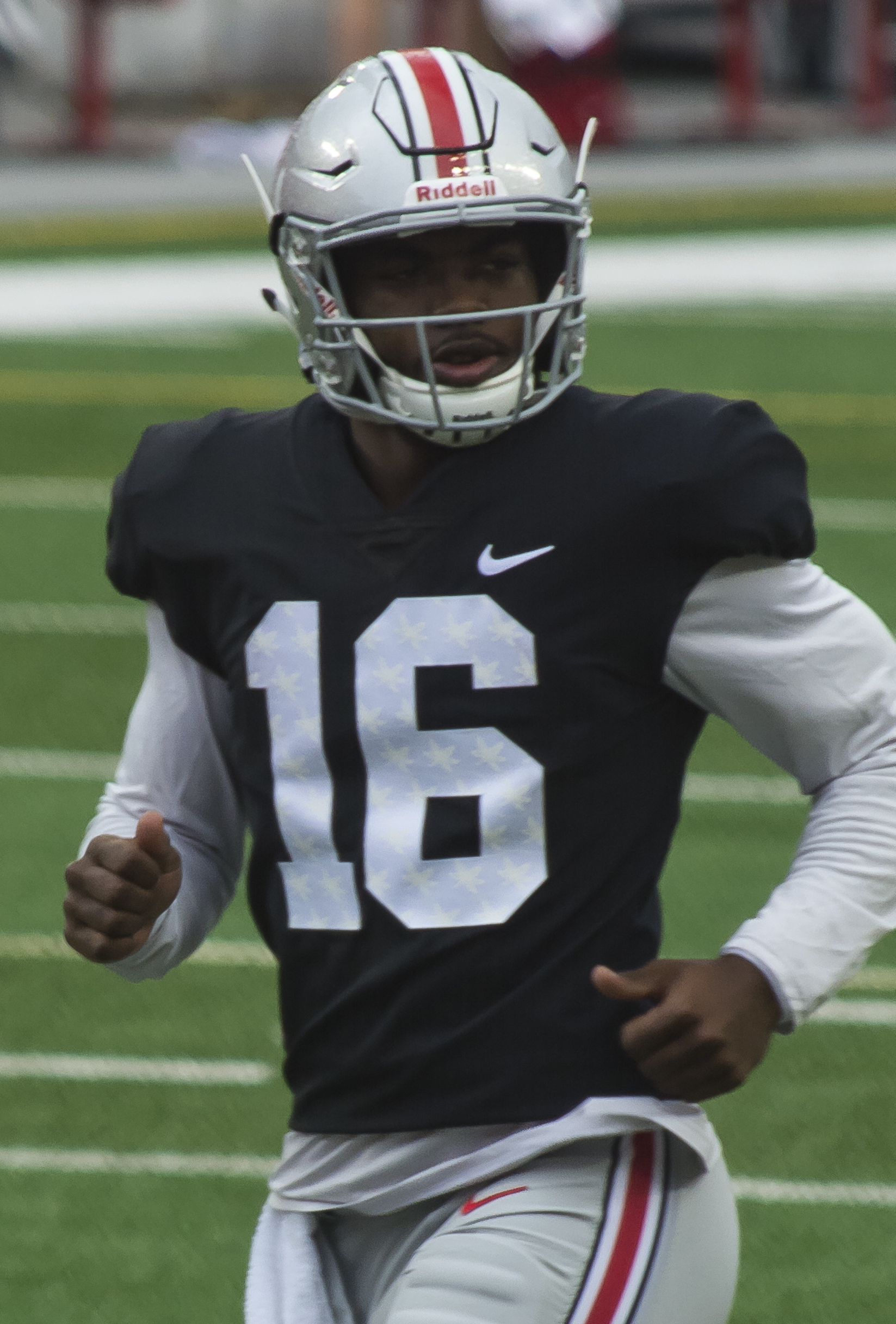
- Barrett with Ohio State in 2017

Chicago Bears
- Title: Quarterbacks coach

Personal information
- Born: January 23, 1995 (age 31); Fort Sill, Oklahoma, U.S.
- Listed height: 6 ft 1 in (1.85 m)
- Listed weight: 225 lb (102 kg)

Career information
- Position: Quarterback
- High school: S. H. Rider (Wichita Falls, Texas)
- College: Ohio State (2013–2017)
- NFL draft: 2018: undrafted

Career history

Playing
- New Orleans Saints (2018)*; Seattle Seahawks (2019)*; New Orleans Saints (2019)*; Pittsburgh Steelers (2019)*; Edmonton Elks (2022)*
- * Offseason or practice squad member only

Coaching
- Detroit Lions (2022–2024); Offensive assistant (2022); Assistant quarterbacks coach (2023–2024); Chicago Bears (2025–present) Quarterbacks coach

Awards and highlights
- CFP national champion (2014); Kellen Moore Award (2017); Third-team All-American (2014); Big Ten Most Valuable Player (2016); 3× Big Ten Quarterback of the Year (2014, 2016, 2017); Big Ten Freshman of the Year (2014); 3× First-team All-Big Ten (2014, 2016, 2017)
- Stats at Pro Football Reference

Joseph Thomas Barrett IV (born January 23, 1995) is an American football coach and former quarterback who is the quarterbacks coach for the Chicago Bears of the National Football League (NFL). He played college football for the Ohio State Buckeyes, earning third-team All-American honors in 2014. Barrett was signed as an undrafted free agent by the NFL's New Orleans Saints in 2018. He also played for the Seattle Seahawks, Pittsburgh Steelers, and Edmonton Elks.

After retiring as a player, Barrett pursued a coaching career and was an assistant coach for the Detroit Lions from 2022 to 2024.

== Early life ==
Barrett attended S. H. Rider High School in Wichita Falls, Texas, where he was a three-sport athlete in football, basketball, and track. He played as a dual-threat quarterback for the Raiders football team. As a junior, he rushed for over 1,500 yards and passed for over 1,600 yards, totaling 23 touchdowns. In his senior season, he rushed for 569 yards with seven touchdowns and passed for 784 yards and five touchdowns before tearing his ACL in October, which ended his high school career prematurely. In spring 2011, Barrett joined the school's track & field team, recording a personal-best time of 11.10 seconds in the 100-meter dash at the Iowa Park Relays, winning the event, while also running the second leg in the 4 x 400-meter relay, helping them earn a second-place finish with a time of 3:46.05 minutes.

Barrett was ranked by the Rivals.com recruiting network as a four-star recruit and the seventh best dual-threat quarterback in his class. He committed to Ohio State University in April 2012.

== College career ==
Barrett redshirted as a freshman at Ohio State in 2013. Barrett was expected to be the backup quarterback to senior Braxton Miller in 2014. However, he became the starter after Miller was forced to miss the season due to injury. On November 29, during the Ohio State-Michigan matchup, Barrett went down with what was later determined to be a broken ankle early in the fourth quarter. The injury happened on a run play, with Ohio State leading 28–21, after Barrett had thrown for 176 yards and a touchdown while also rushing for 89 yards and two touchdowns. Ohio State went on to win the game with Cardale Jones at quarterback. Barrett was cited in the weeks before the injury as a potential Heisman Trophy contender but ended up finishing fifth in the voting. His injury prevented him from returning during the 2014 season, but he had a successful surgery and was expected to be available in a limited capacity for spring practice. Ohio State went on to win their next game against Wisconsin, the 2015 Sugar Bowl against Alabama, and the 2015 CFP National Championship, behind the play of third-string quarterback Cardale Jones.

As a redshirt sophomore in 2015, Barrett passed for 992 yards, 11 touchdowns, and four interceptions, splitting time with Jones. As a redshirt junior in 2016, he passed for 2,555 yards, 24 touchdowns, and seven interceptions. Barrett returned to Ohio State for his final season of eligibility in 2017. As a redshirt senior in 2017, he passed for 3,053 yards, 35 touchdowns, and nine interceptions.

=== Awards and honors ===
Barrett was named Conference Freshman of the Week seven times and received the Big Ten's Thompson–Randle El Freshman of the Year award. He received the Big Ten's Griese–Brees Quarterback of the Year award in 2014, 2016 and 2017. Barrett was named First-team All-Big Ten in 2014, 2016 and 2017 by both conference coaches and media. Barrett earned Big Ten Offensive Player of the Week honors nine times.

Barrett is the only quarterback on either side of the Michigan-Ohio State rivalry to go 4–0 as a starter.

Barrett was the first three-time captain in the history of the Buckeyes football team, preceding Tuf Borland as the second.

=== School and conference records ===
Barrett accumulated more than 25 Ohio State records including most total yards in a season (3,851) and the second most touchdowns in a season (47) as well as most career passing yards (9,434) and completions (769). Additionally, he has several Big Ten Conference records including most career passing touchdowns (104) and total touchdowns (147). He also passed Drew Brees for most career offensive yards, with 12,697.

=== College statistics ===
| Year | Teams | Games | | | Passing | | | | | | | | Rushing | | | |
| Year | Teams | GP | GS | Record | Cmp | Att | Pct | Yds | Avg | TD | Int | Rtg | Att | Yds | Avg | TD |
|---|---|---|---|---|---|---|---|---|---|---|---|---|---|---|---|---|
| 2013 | Ohio State | Redshirt | | | | | | | | | | | | | | |
| 2014 | Ohio State | 12 | 12 | 11–1 | 203 | 314 | 64.6 | 2,834 | 9.0 | 34 | 10 | 169.8 | 171 | 938 | 5.5 | 11 |
| 2015 | Ohio State | 11 | 5 | 4–1 | 93 | 147 | 63.3 | 992 | 6.7 | 11 | 4 | 139.2 | 115 | 682 | 5.9 | 11 |
| 2016 | Ohio State | 13 | 13 | 11–2 | 233 | 379 | 61.5 | 2,555 | 6.7 | 24 | 7 | 135.3 | 205 | 845 | 4.1 | 9 |
| 2017 | Ohio State | 14 | 14 | 12–2 | 240 | 371 | 64.7 | 3,053 | 8.2 | 35 | 9 | 160.1 | 165 | 798 | 4.8 | 12 |
| Career | | 50 | 44 | 38–6 | 769 | 1,211 | 63.5 | 9,434 | 7.8 | 104 | 30 | 152.7 | 656 | 3,263 | 4.9 | 43 |

== Professional career ==
Pre-draft measurables
| Height | Weight | Arm length | Hand span | Wingspan | 40-yard dash | 10-yard split | 20-yard split | 20-yard shuttle | Three-cone drill | Vertical jump | Broad jump | Wonderlic |
|---|---|---|---|---|---|---|---|---|---|---|---|---|
| 6 ft 1 1/4 in (1.86 m) | 224 lb (102 kg) | 32 in (0.81 m) | 9 7/8 in (0.25 m) | 6 ft 4 in (1.93 m) | 4.70 s | 1.63 s | 2.76 s | 4.44 s | 7.38 s | 30 in (0.76 m) | 9 ft 0 in (2.74 m) | 19 |
All values from NFL Scouting Combine

=== New Orleans Saints ===
Barrett went undrafted in the 2018 NFL draft, and was offered to participate in the Indianapolis Colts and the New Orleans Saints rookie minicamps. Originally, Barrett planned on attending the Colts' camp but later decided he would attend the Saints' camp instead. On May 3, 2018, Barrett signed a three-year deal with the Saints as an undrafted free agent. He was waived by the Saints on September 1, 2018, and was signed to the practice squad the next day. He spent time on and off the Saints practice squad, a total of 23 transactions, before signing a reserve/future contract on January 21, 2019.

On August 1, 2019, Barrett was waived by the Saints.

=== Seattle Seahawks ===
On August 10, 2019, Barrett was signed by the Seattle Seahawks. He was waived on August 31, 2019.

=== New Orleans Saints (second stint) ===
On September 17, 2019, Barrett was signed to the New Orleans Saints practice squad following an injury to starter Drew Brees. He was released on October 22.

=== Pittsburgh Steelers ===
On December 24, 2019, Barrett was signed to the Pittsburgh Steelers practice squad. On December 30, he was signed by the Steelers to a reserve/future contract. He was waived on August 2, 2020.

Barrett was selected by the Alphas of The Spring League during its player selection draft on October 30, 2020.

=== Edmonton Elks ===
On January 28, 2022, it was announced that Barrett had signed with the Edmonton Elks. Barrett suffered an injury in late March 2022, and after further medical evaluation it was determined he would miss the entire 2022 season. On May 6, 2022, the Elks announced they had moved Barrett to the retired list.

== Coaching career ==
=== Detroit Lions ===
On July 23, 2022, Barrett was hired by the Detroit Lions as an offensive assistant under head coach Dan Campbell. On February 8, 2023, Barrett was promoted to the role of assistant quarterbacks coach.

=== Chicago Bears ===
On January 24, 2025, the Chicago Bears hired Barrett as their quarterbacks coach under head coach Ben Johnson.

== Personal life ==
On December 10, 2014, police were called to Barrett's apartment after he allegedly choked his pregnant girlfriend and threw her across the room. According to reports, Barrett did so after she refused to leave following an argument. He also took her phone during the altercation. No charges were filed in the incident, and Barrett was not suspended for any length of time.

On October 31, 2015, Barrett was arrested and charged with avoiding a DUI checkpoint and operating a vehicle under the influence. He was fined $400 and had his license suspended. Ohio State suspended Barrett for one game.
