= Mike Weber (American football) =

American football player (born 1997)

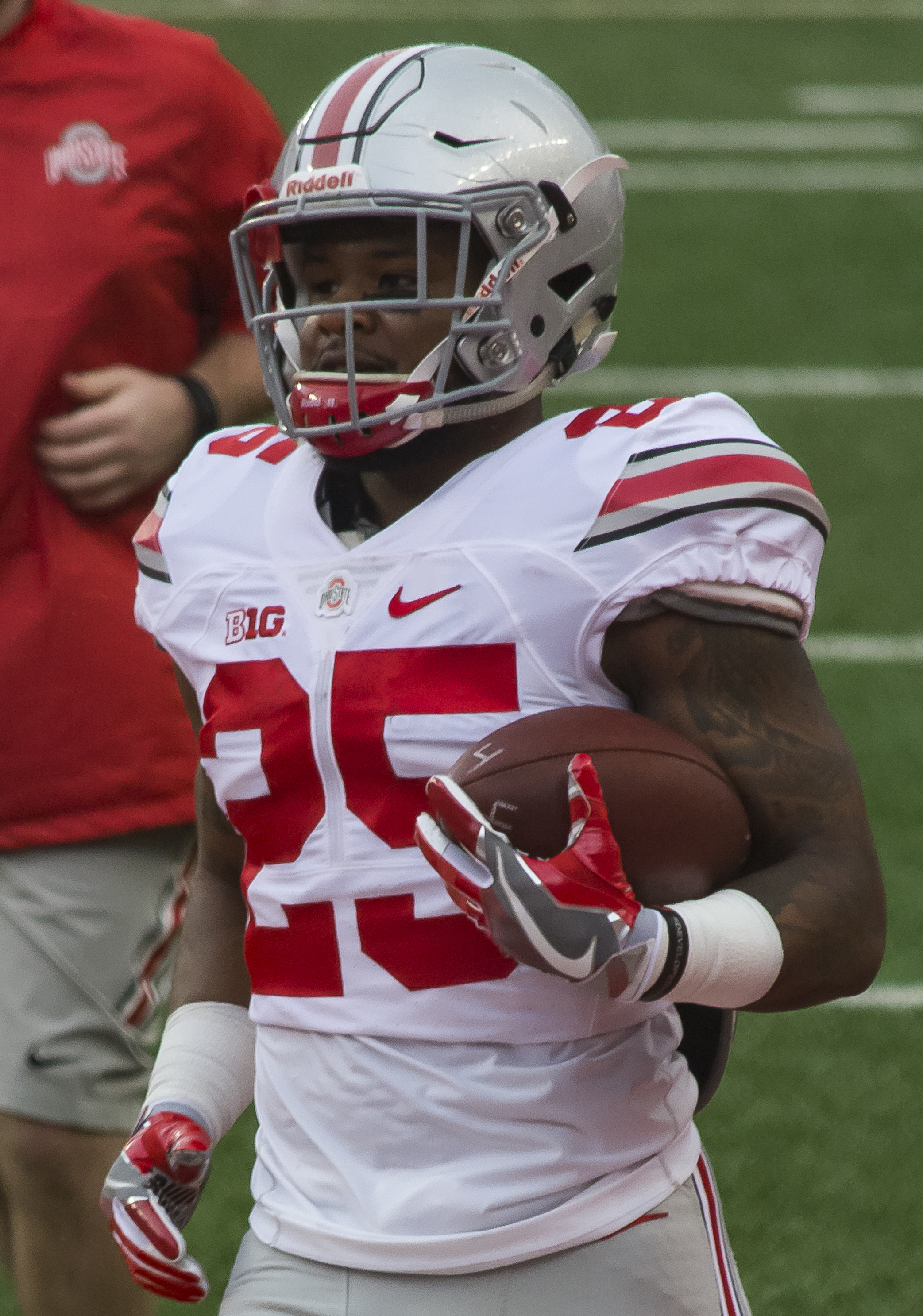
- Weber with the Ohio State Buckeyes in 2017

Profile
- Position: Running back

Personal information
- Born: August 25, 1997 (age 29); Detroit, Michigan U.S.
- Listed height: 5 ft 10 in (1.78 m)
- Listed weight: 211 lb (96 kg)

Career information
- High school: Cass Tech (Detroit, Michigan)
- College: Ohio State (2015–2018)
- NFL draft: 2019: 7th round, 218th overall pick

Career history
- Dallas Cowboys (2019)*; Kansas City Chiefs (2019)*; Green Bay Packers (2020); New York Giants (2021)*; New Jersey Generals (2022)*; Orlando Guardians (2024)*; Montreal Alouettes (2024)*
- * Offseason or practice squad member only

Awards and highlights
- Super Bowl champion (LIV); Big Ten Freshman of the Year (2016); Second-team All-Big Ten (2016)
- Stats at Pro Football Reference

Mike Weber (born August 25, 1997) is an American professional football running back. He played college football at Ohio State. He has been a member of the Dallas Cowboys, Kansas City Chiefs, Green Bay Packers, and New York Giants of the National Football League (NFL), the New Jersey Generals of the United States Football League (USFL), the Orlando Guardians of the XFL, and the Montreal Alouettes of the Canadian Football League (CFL).

== Early life ==
Weber attended Cass Technical High School in Detroit, Michigan. As a senior, he rushed for 2,268 yards with 26 touchdowns, despite missing three games to injury.

He averaged 10.1-yards per carry, while helping his team reach the state's semi-finals. He rushed for a state record 404 yards and five touchdowns in the regional championship win over Chippewa Valley High School. He was named All-state, U.S. Army All-American and was a co-recipient of the Detroit player of the year award.

== College career ==
Weber originally accepted a football scholarship from the University of Michigan, but changed his decision to enroll at Ohio State University instead.

After redshirting his first year in 2015, Weber took over as the starting running back role in 2016, replacing Ezekiel Elliott who had graduated. In his first career game he rushed for 136 yards on 19 carries against Bowling Green State University. He led the team with 1,096 rushing yards on 182 carries (6.5-yard average) and 9 rushing touchdowns in 13 starts. At the end of the season, he was named the Thompson–Randle El Freshman of the Year and second-team All-Big Ten.

As a sophomore, he suffered a left hamstring injury during summer workouts that kept him out most of training camp and most of the season . He got healthy in the latter part of the season, finishing with 101 carries for 626 yards (6.2-yard average) and still led the team with 10 touchdowns.

As a junior, he rotated with J. K. Dobbins while appearing in 13 games. He registered 172 carries for 954 yards (6.0 yard average) and 8 touchdowns. He switched his jersey number from 25 to 5 (the number he wore when he played little league football in Detroit) for the contest against the University of Michigan, returning to his former number for the team's final two games.

On December 16, 2018, Weber announced that he would forgo his final year of eligibility and declared for the 2019 NFL draft.

=== Statistics ===
Ohio State Buckeyes
| Season | Rushing | | | | Receiving | | | |
| Season | Att | Yards | Avg | TD | Rec | Yards | Avg | TD |
| 2015 | Redshirt | | | | | | | |
| 2016 | 182 | 1,096 | 6.0 | 9 | 23 | 91 | 4.0 | 0 |
| 2017 | 101 | 626 | 6.2 | 10 | 10 | 94 | 9.4 | 0 |
| 2018 | 172 | 1,050 | 6.1 | 5 | 21 | 112 | 5.3 | 1 |
| Career | 455 | 2,772 | 6.1 | 24 | 54 | 297 | 5.5 | 1 |

== Professional career ==
Pre-draft measurables
| Height | Weight | Arm length | Hand span | 40-yard dash | Vertical jump | Bench press |
|---|---|---|---|---|---|---|
| 5 ft 9 5/8 in (1.77 m) | 211 lb (96 kg) | 29 3/4 in (0.76 m) | 9 3/8 in (0.24 m) | 4.47 s | 33.5 in (0.85 m) | 22 reps |
All values from NFL Combine

=== Dallas Cowboys ===
Weber was selected by the Dallas Cowboys in the seventh round (218th overall) of the 2019 NFL Draft. He was waived on August 31, 2019, and was re-signed to the practice squad. His practice squad contract with the team expired on January 6, 2020.

=== Kansas City Chiefs ===
On January 8, 2020, Weber was signed to the Kansas City Chiefs practice squad. Weber won Super Bowl LIV with the Chiefs after they defeated the San Francisco 49ers 31–20. He re-signed with the Chiefs on February 5, 2020. On May 4, 2020, Weber was waived by the Chiefs, after the team drafted Clyde Edwards-Helaire in the first round and signed free agent DeAndre Washington.

=== Green Bay Packers ===
On November 11, 2020, Weber was signed to the Green Bay Packers' practice squad. He was elevated to the active roster on November 21 and 28 for the team's weeks 11 and 12 games against the Indianapolis Colts and Chicago Bears, and reverted to the practice squad after each game. On January 25, 2021, Weber signed a reserve/futures contract with the Packers. On June 9, 2021, Weber was waived by the Packers.

=== New York Giants ===
On July 21, 2021, Weber signed with the New York Giants. He was placed on injured reserve on August 4, 2021, with a hip flexor. He was released on August 13.

=== New Jersey Generals ===
Weber was drafted by the New Jersey Generals of the United States Football League (USFL) in the 27th round of the 2022 USFL draft in February 2022. He suffered a knee injury before the start of the season, and was transferred to the team's practice squad on April 14, 2022. He was released on April 19, 2022.

=== Orlando Guardians ===
On November 2, 2023, Weber signed with the Orlando Guardians of the XFL. The Guardians folded when the XFL and USFL merged to create the United Football League (UFL).

=== Montreal Alouettes ===
Weber signed with the Montreal Alouettes of the Canadian Football League on January 12, 2024. He was released on May 28, 2024.
