= Jamarco Jones =

American football player (born 1996)

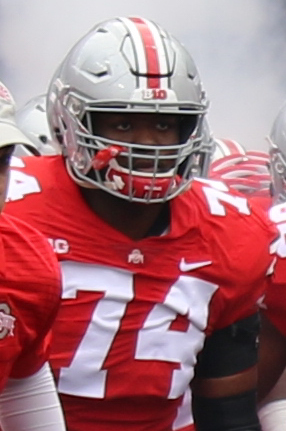
- Jones with Ohio State in 2017

Detroit Lions
- Title: Offensive tackle Personnel Advisor

Personal information
- Born: June 4, 1996 (age 30); Chicago, Illinois, U.S.
- Listed height: 6 ft 4 in (1.93 m)
- Listed weight: 315 lb (143 kg)

Career information
- High school: De La Salle Institute (Chicago)
- College: Ohio State (2014–2017)
- NFL draft: 2018: 5th round, 168th overall pick

Career history

Playing
- Seattle Seahawks (2018–2021); Tennessee Titans (2022–2023); Detroit Lions (2024–2025)

Operations
- Detroit Lions (2026-present); Personnel Advisor (2026-present)

Awards and highlights
- CFP national champion (2014); First-team All-Big Ten (2017); Second-team All-Big Ten (2016)

Career NFL statistics as of 2025
- Games played: 38
- Games started: 7
- Stats at Pro Football Reference

Jamarco “Juice” Jones (born June 4, 1996) is an American former professional football player who was an offensive tackle in the National Football League (NFL). He played college football for the Ohio State Buckeyes. He started his final 27 games at Ohio State at left tackle.

== Professional career ==
Pre-draft measurables
Height	Weight	Arm length	Hand span	40-yard dash	10-yard split	20-yard split	20-yard shuttle	Three-cone drill	Vertical jump	Broad jump	Bench press
6 ft 4 in (1.93 m)	299 lb (136 kg)	35 1/8 in (0.89 m)	9 1/2 in (0.24 m)	5.50 s	1.90 s	3.02 s	4.99 s	8.32 s	24.0 in (0.61 m)	8 ft 6 in (2.59 m)	18 reps
All values from NFL Combine/Pro Day

=== Seattle Seahawks ===
Jones was selected by the Seattle Seahawks in the fifth round, 168th overall, of the 2018 NFL draft. He was placed on injured reserve on September 1, 2018.

On October 3, 2019, Jones replaced right guard D.J. Fluker who was injured during a Thursday Night Football game against the Los Angeles Rams. Prior to this point Jones had never played the guard position before. The Seahawks defeated the Rams 30–29. On December 19, 2020, Jones was placed on injured reserve.

On November 27, 2021, Jones was placed on injured reserve. He was activated on January 1, 2022.

=== Tennessee Titans ===
On March 17, 2022, Jones signed a two-year contract with the Tennessee Titans. He was placed on injured reserve on September 22.

After being involved in multiple fights during training camp, the Titans released Jones on August 3, 2023.

=== Detroit Lions ===
On August 11, 2024, Jones signed with the Detroit Lions. He was released on August 27, and re-signed to the practice squad. Jones signed a reserve/future contract with Detroit on January 20, 2025. On September 8, the Lions announced that Jones, who was placed on injured reserve prior to the season, would miss the entire year due to an ankle injury.

== Post-playing career ==
On August 12, 2026, Jones was hired by the Detroit Lions as a Nunn-Wooten scouting fellow.
