= 2017 Ohio State Buckeyes football team =

American college football season

2017 Ohio State Buckeyes football

Big Ten champion Big Ten East Division champion Cotton Bowl Classic champion

Big Ten Championship Game, W 27–21 vs. Wisconsin

Cotton Bowl Classic, W 24–7 vs. USC
- Conference: Big Ten Conference
- East Division

Ranking
- Coaches: No. 5
- AP: No. 5
- Record: 12–2 (8–1 Big Ten)
- Head coach: Urban Meyer (6th season)
- Offensive coordinator: Kevin Wilson (1st season)
- Co-offensive coordinator: Ryan Day (1st season)
- Offensive scheme: Spread
- Defensive coordinator: Greg Schiano (2nd season)
- Base defense: 4–3
- Captain: J. T. Barrett; Parris Campbell; Jalyn Holmes; Sam Hubbard; Tyquan Lewis; Terry McLaurin; Billy Price; Tracy Sprinkle; Chris Worley
- Home stadium: Ohio Stadium

2017 Big Ten Conference football standings
	Conf.			Overall
Team	W		L	W		L
East Division
No. 5 Ohio State xy$	8	–	1	12	–	2
No. 15 Michigan State	7	–	2	10	–	3
No. 8 Penn State	7	–	2	11	–	2
Michigan	5	–	4	8	–	5
Rutgers	3	–	6	4	–	8
Indiana	2	–	7	5	–	7
Maryland	2	–	7	4	–	8
West Division
No. 7 Wisconsin xy	9	–	0	13	–	1
No. 17 Northwestern	7	–	2	10	–	3
Iowa	4	–	5	8	–	5
Purdue	4	–	5	7	–	6
Nebraska	3	–	6	4	–	8
Minnesota	2	–	7	5	–	7
Illinois	0	–	9	2	–	10
Championship: Ohio State 27, Wisconsin 21
$ – Conference champion; x – Division champion/co-champions; y – Championship game participant; Rankings from AP Poll

The 2017 Ohio State Buckeyes football team represented Ohio State University during the 2017 NCAA Division I FBS football season. The Buckeyes played their home games at Ohio Stadium in Columbus, Ohio. It was the Buckeyes' 128th overall, the 105th as a member of the Big Ten Conference, and fourth as a member of the Eastern Division. They were led by Urban Meyer, who was in his 6th season as head coach at the school.

Coming off a College Football Playoff appearance in 2016, the Buckeyes began the year ranked second in the preseason AP Poll and were the overwhelming favorites to win the Big Ten. In the second game of the year, they suffered their first loss at the hands of No. 5 Oklahoma in Columbus, whom Ohio State had beaten on the road the previous year. Ohio State won their following six games, including a 39–38 victory over No. 2 Penn State, but lost in a blowout on the road to Iowa the following week. The Buckeyes won their remaining regular season games and earned a spot in the 2017 Big Ten Championship Game by winning the East Division with an 8–1 conference record.

Ohio State would play then-undefeated No. 4 Wisconsin as a heavy favorite. The Buckeyes would win in Indianapolis, causing the last-undefeated FBS team to incur a loss. There was huge controversy over the College Football Playoff committee as to who would get into the final four; Alabama, which didn't play in the SEC Championship, was given a spot over both the Buckeyes and Badgers, both of whom just missed out on a playoff spot. Ohio State instead received an invitation to the Cotton Bowl. They defeated USC in that bowl to end the season at 12–2 and ranked fifth in the final polls.

Ohio State was led on offense by quarterback J. T. Barrett, who was named first-team All-Big Ten. Barrett was both a passing and a running threat, finishing with 3,053 yards and a Big Ten-leading 35 touchdowns through the air, and 798 yards and 12 touchdowns on the ground. His 47 total touchdowns were second in FBS behind Baker Mayfield. Freshman running back J. K. Dobbins finished second in the Big Ten with 1,403 rushing yards. Center Billy Price was a consensus first-team All-American, as was cornerback Denzel Ward. Both players were selected in the first round of the 2018 NFL draft; Price was awarded the Rimington Trophy as the nation's top center.

== Spring Game ==
The 2017 LiFE Sports Spring Game took place in Columbus Ohio at 12:30 pm on April 15, 2017.

Date	Time	Spring Game	Site	TV	Result	Attendance
April 15	12:30 pm	Scarlet vs. Gray	Ohio Stadium • Columbus, OH	BTN	Scarlet 38–31	80,000

== Recruiting ==
=== Recruits ===
The Buckeyes signed a total of 21 recruits.

College recruiting (2017)
Name	Hometown	School	Height	Weight	Commit date
Shaun Wade; CB	Jacksonville, Florida	Trinity Christian Academy	6 ft 1 in (1.85 m)	177 lb (80 kg)	Jan 12, 2015
Shaun Wade; CB	Recruit ratings: Scout: Rivals: 247Sports: ESPN:				
Josh Myers; OG	Miamisburg, Ohio	Miamisburg HS	6 ft 6 in (1.98 m)	306 lb (139 kg)	Jan 25, 2015
Josh Myers; OG	Recruit ratings: Scout: Rivals: 247Sports: ESPN:				
Marcus Williamson; CB	Westerville, Ohio	IMG Academy	5 ft 9 in (1.75 m)	180 lb (82 kg)	Apr 18, 2015
Marcus Williamson; CB	Recruit ratings: Scout: Rivals: 247Sports: ESPN:				
Jerron Cage; DT	Cincinnati, Ohio	Winton Woods HS	6 ft 2 in (1.88 m)	282 lb (128 kg)	Jul 21, 2015
Jerron Cage; DT	Recruit ratings: Scout: Rivals: 247Sports: ESPN:				
Blake Haubeil; K	Buffalo, New York	Canisius HS	6 ft 3 in (1.91 m)	200 lb (91 kg)	Jul 25, 2015
Blake Haubeil; K	Recruit ratings: Scout: Rivals: 247Sports: ESPN:				
Isaiah Pryor; S	Lawrenceville, Georgia	IMG Academy	6 ft 2 in (1.88 m)	195 lb (88 kg)	Jul 27, 2015
Isaiah Pryor; S	Recruit ratings: Scout: Rivals: 247Sports: ESPN:				
Brendon White; WR	Powell, Ohio	Olentangy Liberty HS	6 ft 2 in (1.88 m)	200 lb (91 kg)	Oct 2, 2015
Brendon White; WR	Recruit ratings: Scout: Rivals: 247Sports: ESPN:				
Haskell Garrett; DT	Las Vegas, Nevada	Bishop Gorman HS	6 ft 2 in (1.88 m)	288 lb (131 kg)	Feb 9, 2016
Haskell Garrett; DT	Recruit ratings: Scout: Rivals: 247Sports: ESPN:				
J. K. Dobbins; RB	La Grange, Texas	La Grange HS	5 ft 10 in (1.78 m)	201 lb (91 kg)	Mar 6, 2016
J. K. Dobbins; RB	Recruit ratings: Scout: Rivals: 247Sports: ESPN:				
Tate Martell; QB	Las Vegas, Nevada	Bishop Gorman HS	5 ft 11 in (1.80 m)	203 lb (92 kg)	Jun 12, 2016
Tate Martell; QB	Recruit ratings: Scout: Rivals: 247Sports: ESPN:				
Wyatt Davis; OG	Bellflower, California	St. John Bosco HS	6 ft 5 in (1.96 m)	310 lb (140 kg)	Jun 24, 2016
Wyatt Davis; OG	Recruit ratings: Scout: Rivals: 247Sports: ESPN:				
Chase Young; DE	Hyattsville, Maryland	DeMatha Catholic HS	6 ft 5 in (1.96 m)	251 lb (114 kg)	Jul 22, 2016
Chase Young; DE	Recruit ratings: Scout: Rivals: 247Sports: ESPN:				
Amir Riep; CB	Cincinnati, Ohio	Colerain HS	5 ft 11 in (1.80 m)	185 lb (84 kg)	Jul 23, 2016
Amir Riep; CB	Recruit ratings: Scout: Rivals: 247Sports: ESPN:				
Trevon Grimes; WR	Fort Lauderdale, Florida	St. Thomas Aquinas HS	6 ft 3 in (1.91 m)	202 lb (92 kg)	Aug 22, 2016
Trevon Grimes; WR	Recruit ratings: Scout: Rivals: 247Sports: ESPN:				
Baron Browning; LB	Kennedale, Texas	Kennedale HS	6 ft 2 in (1.88 m)	229 lb (104 kg)	Dec 1, 2016
Baron Browning; LB	Recruit ratings: Scout: Rivals: 247Sports: ESPN:				
Pete Werner; LB	Indianapolis, Indiana	Cathedral HS	6 ft 3 in (1.91 m)	220 lb (100 kg)	Dec 11, 2016
Pete Werner; LB	Recruit ratings: Scout: Rivals: 247Sports: ESPN:				
Jeff Okudah; S	Grand Prairie, Texas	South Grand Prairie HS	6 ft 1 in (1.85 m)	190 lb (86 kg)	Jan 7, 2017
Jeff Okudah; S	Recruit ratings: Scout: Rivals: 247Sports: ESPN:				
Kendall Sheffield; CB	Missouri City, Texas	Blinn College	6 ft 0 in (1.83 m)	185 lb (84 kg)	Jan 10, 2017
Kendall Sheffield; CB	Recruit ratings: Scout: Rivals: 247Sports: ESPN:				
Jaylen Harris; WR	Cleveland, Ohio	Cleveland Heights HS	6 ft 5 in (1.96 m)	210 lb (95 kg)	Jan 13, 2017
Jaylen Harris; WR	Recruit ratings: Scout: Rivals: 247Sports: ESPN:				
Elijah Gardiner; WR	Kemp, Texas	Kemp HS	6 ft 5 in (1.96 m)	185 lb (84 kg)	Jan 30, 2017
Elijah Gardiner; WR	Recruit ratings: Scout: Rivals: 247Sports: ESPN:				
Thayer Munford; OT	Massillon, Ohio	Washington HS (Massillon, OH)	6 ft 6 in (1.98 m)	325 lb (147 kg)	Feb 1, 2017
Thayer Munford; OT	Recruit ratings: Scout: Rivals: 247Sports: ESPN:				
Overall recruit ranking:
Note: In many cases, Scout, Rivals, 247Sports, On3, and ESPN may conflict in their listings of height and weight.; In these cases, the average was taken. ESPN grades are on a 100-point scale.; Sources: "Ohio State Football Commitments". Rivals.; "2017 Ohio State Football Commits". Scout.; "ESPN". ESPN.; "Scout.com Team Recruiting Rankings". Scout.; "2017 Team Ranking". Rivals.com.

== Schedule ==
The Buckeyes' 2017 schedule consisted of seven home games and 5 away games. Ohio State hosted all three of its non-conference games; against Oklahoma of the Big 12, against independent Army, and against UNLV of the Mountain West.

The Buckeyes played nine conference games; they hosted Maryland, Penn State, Michigan State, and Illinois. They traveled to Indiana, Rutgers, Nebraska, Iowa, and rival Michigan.

Date	Time	Opponent	Rank	Site	TV	Result	Attendance
August 31	8:00 p.m.	at Indiana	No. 2	Memorial Stadium; Bloomington, IN (College GameDay)	ESPN^{1}	W 49–21	52,929
September 9	7:30 p.m.	No. 5 Oklahoma*	No. 2	Ohio Stadium; Columbus, OH (College GameDay)	ABC	L 16–31	109,088
September 16	4:30 p.m.	Army*	No. 8	Ohio Stadium; Columbus, OH	FOX	W 38–7	108,414
September 23	12:00 p.m.	UNLV*	No. 10	Ohio Stadium; Columbus, OH	BTN	W 54–21	106,187
September 30	7:30 p.m.	at Rutgers	No. 11	High Point Solutions Stadium; Piscataway, NJ	BTN	W 56–0	46,328
October 7	4:00 p.m.	Maryland^{†}	No. 10	Ohio Stadium; Columbus, OH	FOX	W 62–14	107,180
October 14	7:30 p.m.	at Nebraska	No. 9	Memorial Stadium; Lincoln, NE	FS1	W 56–14	89,346
October 28	3:30 p.m.	No. 2 Penn State	No. 6	Ohio Stadium; Columbus, OH (rivalry, College GameDay)	FOX	W 39–38	109,302
November 4	3:30 p.m.	at Iowa	No. 6	Kinnick Stadium; Iowa City, IA	ESPN	L 24–55	67,669
November 11	12:00 p.m.	No. 12 Michigan State	No. 13	Ohio Stadium; Columbus, OH	FOX	W 48–3	107,011
November 18	3:30 p.m.	Illinois	No. 9	Ohio Stadium; Columbus, OH (Illibuck)	ABC	W 52–14	105,282
November 25	12:00 p.m.	at Michigan	No. 9	Michigan Stadium; Ann Arbor, MI (rivalry)	FOX	W 31–20	112,028
December 2	8:00 p.m.	vs. No. 4 Wisconsin	No. 8	Lucas Oil Stadium; Indianapolis, IN (Big Ten Championship)	FOX	W 27–21	65,886
December 29	8:30 p.m.	vs. No. 8 USC*	No. 5	AT&T Stadium; Arlington, TX (Cotton Bowl Classic)	ESPN	W 24–7	67,510
*Non-conference game; ^{†}Homecoming; Rankings from AP Poll and CFP Rankings (after October 31) released prior to game; All times are in Eastern time

- 1 – ESPN's College GameDay was held in Bloomington for the first time in the show's broadcast history.

== Rankings ==
Ranking movements Legend: ██ Increase in ranking ██ Decrease in ranking ( ) = First-place votes
	Week															
Poll	Pre	1	2	3	4	5	6	7	8	9	10	11	12	13	14	Final
AP	2 (4)	2 (1)	8	10	11	10	9	6	6	3	11	8	8	8	5	5
Coaches	2 (5)	2 (2)	9	9	9	9	8	6	6	3	11	8	8	7	5	5
CFP	Not released									6	13	9	9	8	5	Not released

== Game summaries ==
=== At Indiana ===
No. 2 Ohio State at Indiana

Team	1	2	3	4	Total
• No. 2 Ohio State	3	10	22	14	49
Indiana	7	7	7	0	21

- Date: August 31, 2017
- Location:
  Memorial Stadium
  Bloomington, IN
- Game start: 8:00 p.m. EDT
- Elapsed time: 3:34
- Game attendance: 52,929
- Game weather: Partly Cloudy
- Referee: Daniel Capron
- TV announcers (ESPN): Dave Flemming (Play-By-Play), Kirk Herbstreit (Color), Laura Rutledge (Sideline)

The No. 2 Ohio State Buckeyes went on the road for their first game of the season, a conference game against the Indiana Hoosiers at Memorial Stadium in Bloomington, Indiana. This marked the first time that the Buckeyes opened a season on the road since their 42–24 victory over Virginia Tech in 2015 and their first time opening with a Big Ten opponent since 1976 when they defeated Michigan State 49–21.

Ohio State began the game well, driving the ball 66 yards on 11 plays, but were stalled in the redzone, settling for a Sean Nuernberger field goal to take an early 3–0 lead. The Hoosiers answered with an 87-yard drive that was capped with an 18-yard touchdown pass from Richard Lagow to tight end Ian Thomas to take a four-point lead. The teams continued to trade punts until the second quarter when the Buckeyes' Jordan Fuller intercepted an Indiana pass in the endzone. Ohio State mounted a 58-yard drive that ended came up short at Indiana two-yard line that resulted in another Nuernberger field goal to bring the score to 7–6. Each team would score on touchdown drives of more than 75 yards on the next two possessions to give the Hoosiers a 14–13 lead at halftime.

The third quarter started off looking like it would continue to be a back-and-forth game as the teams again traded touchdowns, but the Buckeye passing offense, led by J. T. Barrett, threw touchdown passes to Parris Campbell for 74 yards and to Johnnie Dixon for 54 yard to give the Buckeyes a 35–21 lead. The Buckeye defense took over from there turning the Hoosiers over two times, each resulting in an Ohio State touchdown. The Buckeyes held on for the win, 49–21.

Two Buckeye records were set during the game: J. K. Dobbins broke Maurice Clarett's 2002 debut rushing performance of 175 yards by amassing 181 yards on the ground, and J. T. Barrett also moved onto the list of the most career offensive yards by a Buckeye with his 365-yard performance. Barrett was named co-Offensive Big Ten Player of the Week for the seventh time in his career and Dobbins was named Big Ten Freshman of the Week for their performances in week one.

Game Statistics

Statistic	OSU	IU
Total yards	596	437
Passing yards	304	420
Rushing yards	292	17
Penalties	5–50	5–33
Turnovers	0	3
Time of Possession	31:50	28:10

Game Leaders

Statistic	OSU	IU
Passing	J. T. Barrett (304)	Richard Lagow (410)
Rushing	J. K. Dobbins (181)	Morgan Ellison (24)
Receiving	Parris Campbell (136)	Simmie Cobbs (149)

=== No. 5 Oklahoma ===
No. 5 Oklahoma at No. 2 Ohio State

Team	1	2	3	4	Total
• No. 5 Oklahoma	0	3	14	14	31
No. 2 Ohio State	0	3	10	3	16

- Date: September 9, 2017
- Location:
  Ohio Stadium
  Columbus, OH
- Game start: 7:30 p.m. EDT
- Elapsed time: 3:31
- Game attendance: 109,088
- Game weather: Partly Cloudy
- Referee: Mike Defee
- TV announcers (ABC): Chris Fowler (Play-By-Play), Kirk Herbstreit (Color), Maria Taylor (Sideline)

The No. 2 Ohio State Buckeyes hosted the No. 5 Oklahoma Sooners at Ohio Stadium in Columbus, Ohio, in a top-five matchup. College GameDay made its record 16th visit to Ohio State's campus and the program's 39th appearance overall, including its fourth in a row. It was the fourth meeting between the two programs.

In the first quarter, Oklahoma moved into Buckeye territory on each of its first three drives, but came away without points because of two fumbles and a failed fourth-down conversion. Ohio State opened with two consecutive punts, and the game remained scoreless at the end of the quarter. The first points came with 11:11 remaining in the second quarter, when Sean Nuernberger made a 24-yard field goal after the Buckeyes failed to convert in the red zone. Eight plays later, Oklahoma again came up empty in Ohio State territory, missing a 37-yard field-goal attempt. After an Ohio State punt, the Sooners put together a 55-yard drive and tied the game at 3–3 on a 35-yard field goal before halftime.

Ohio State opened the second half with a 56-yard kickoff return by Parris Campbell, followed by a 6-yard touchdown run by J. K. Dobbins, to take a 10–3 lead. Oklahoma answered 1:47 later, as Baker Mayfield threw a 36-yard touchdown pass to Dimitri Flowers to tie the game. Ohio State did not score another touchdown and added only two more field goals by Nuernberger. Mayfield finished with 386 passing yards and three touchdowns as Oklahoma pulled away in the second half. A touchdown run by Jordan Smallwood completed the scoring in the Sooners' 31–16 victory. After the game, Mayfield planted Oklahoma's flag at midfield while teammates celebrated on the Ohio State logo. He later apologized for the incident.

Ohio State (1–1, 1–0) fell to No. 8 in the AP Poll, while Oklahoma (2–0) rose to No. 2.

Game statistics

Statistic	OSU	OU
Total yards	350	490
Passing yards	183	386
Rushing yards	167	104
Penalties	9–87	3–26
Turnovers	1	2
Time of possession	24:43	35:17

Game leaders

Statistic	OSU	OU
Passing	J. T. Barrett (183)	Baker Mayfield (386)
Rushing	J. K. Dobbins (72)	Trey Sermon (62)
Receiving	K. J. Hill (44)	Dimitri Flowers (98)

=== Army ===
Army at No. 8 Ohio State

Team	1	2	3	4	Total
Army	0	7	0	0	7
• No. 8 Ohio State	14	3	14	7	38

- Date: September 16, 2017
- Location:
  Ohio Stadium
  Columbus, OH
- Game start: 4:30 p.m. EDT
- Elapsed time: 3:04
- Game attendance: 108,414
- Game weather: Partly Cloudy
- Referee: Mark Kluczynski
- TV announcers (FOX): Joe Davis (Play-By-Play), Brady Quinn (Color), Bruce Feldman (Sideline)

The No. 8 Ohio State Buckeyes (1–1, 1–0) took on the Army Black Knights (2–0) at Ohio Stadium in Columbus, Ohio. This was the Buckeyes first-ever match-up against the Black Knights and the seventh match-up against a military academy. Ohio State is 5–1 all-time against the other two major military academies with the most recent win coming in 2014 against Navy and the only loss coming in 1990 against Air Force. A week after seemingly nothing went right in a prime-time loss to Oklahoma, Ohio State couldn't have scripted a better start in its bounce-back attempt against Army. The Buckeyes purred on their first two drives, covering 75 and then 94 yards, to race to a 14–0 lead. Army limited the Buckeyes to one possession in the second quarter and outscored OSU to draw to 17–7. Army started the quarter with an 11-play drive that ended when Blake Wilson missed a 43-yard field-goal attempt. Finally getting the ball back in the second half, the Buckeyes wasted little time taking it to the end zone. J. K. Dobbins ripped off a 22-yard run on first down from the 26, then went 52 yards on a run around left end, a play in which the freshman juked Army cornerback Mike Reynolds almost into the ground. That made the score 24–7, and after Kendall Sheffield recovered a fumbled snap on Army's next drive, OSU went to the air to increase its lead. J. T. Barrett completed all three of his passes on the next drive, including a 31-yarder across the middle to tight end Marcus Baugh to move the ball to the 22. Two plays later, Barrett threw a fastball strike to Terry McLaurin, who headed downfield until he found an open spot in the end zone. With a 31–7 lead, the Buckeyes forced a three-and-out but couldn't put the game away and punted from inside Army territory late in the quarter. The Buckeyes were winning big on the scoreboard, and that continued to the end. Barrett's 9-yard touchdown pass to Austin Mack, which gave the senior quarterback the Big Ten record by accounting for his 107th career touchdown. Another three-and-out gave OSU the ball back with 4:36 remaining, and backup QB Dwayne Haskins guided the offense 72 yards before the time arrived for victory formation.

Game Statistics

Statistic	OSU	Army
Total yards	586	278
Passing yards	316	19
Rushing yards	270	259
Penalties	5–55	2–22
Turnovers	0	1
Time of Possession	23:03	36:57

Game Leaders

Statistic	OSU	Army
Passing	J. T. Barrett (270)	Ahmad Bradshaw (19)
Rushing	J. K. Dobbins (172)	Darnell Woolfolk (74)
Receiving	K. J. Hill (74)	Kell Walker (10)

=== UNLV ===
UNLV at No. 10 Ohio State

Team	1	2	3	4	Total
UNLV	0	7	7	7	21
• No. 10 Ohio State	16	28	10	0	54

- Date: September 23, 2017
- Location:
  Ohio Stadium
  Columbus, OH
- Game start: 12:00 p.m. EDT
- Elapsed time: 3:17
- Game attendance: 106,187
- Game weather: Clear
- Referee: Ron Snodgrass
- TV announcers (BTN): Kevin Kugler (Play-By-Play), Matt Millen (Color), and Lisa Byington (Sideline)

The No. 10 Ohio State Buckeyes improved to 3–1 with a 54–21 win at Ohio Stadium over the UNLV Rebels, who fell to 1–2. The Buckeyes were led by quarterback J. T. Barrett, who threw 12 completions for 209 yards for 5 touchdowns in just one half before being replaced by Dwayne Haskins who threw for 228 yards and two touchdowns, but tarnished by one interception that was thrown for a Rebel touchdown. The Buckeye receivers accumulated seven touchdowns by seven different receivers, which is a Big Ten record. The Rebels' highlights came on an 11-play, 83 yard drive at the end of the second quarter, a 55-yard Lexington Thomas run in the third quarter and a 65-yard interception return for a touchdown by Javin White in the fourth.

Game statistics

Statistic	OSU	UNLV
Total yards	664	264
Passing yards	474	88
Rushing yards	190	176
Penalties	8–85	4–30
Turnovers	3	2
Time of possession	26:48	33:12

Game leaders

Statistic	OSU	UNLV
Passing	Dwayne Haskins (228)	Armani Rogers (88)
Rushing	J. K. Dobbins (95)	Lexington Thomas (84)
Receiving	Parris Campbell (105)	Devonte Boyd (48)

=== At Rutgers ===
No. 11 Ohio State at Rutgers

Team	1	2	3	4	Total
• No. 11 Ohio State	7	28	7	14	56
Rutgers	0	0	0	0	0

- Date: September 30, 2017
- Location:
  High Point Solutions Stadium
  Piscataway, NJ
- Game start: 7:30 p.m. EDT
- Elapsed time: 3:28
- Game attendance: 46,328
- Game weather: Mostly Cloudy
- Referee: Don Willard
- TV announcers (BTN): Kevin Kugler (Play-By-Play), Matt Millen (Color), and Lisa Byington (Sideline)

The No. 11 Ohio State Buckeyes (4–1, 2–0) shut out divisional foe the Rutgers Scarlet Knights (1–4, 0–2) by a score of 56–0. This was the second consecutive year that the Buckeye's shut out the Scarlet Knights. In their four match-ups, the Buckeyes have outscored Rutgers by a score of 219–24. Ohio State was once again led by J. T. Barrett who became Ohio State's all-time leading passer by throwing for 275 yards and 3 touchdowns. Mike Weber, who had been injured, scored his first three touchdowns of the year, capping off three 60+ yard drives. Additionally, Johnnie Dixon was on the receiving end of two of Barrett's passes and ended the day with 115 yards. Demario McCall had 138 all-purpose yards including a 48-yard touchdown run and a 35-yard touchdown pass from backup quarterback Dwayne Haskins. All but one of Rutgers' possessions ended in a punt or a turnover with the exception of a missed 32-yard field goal with 43 seconds left in the game.

Game Statistics

Statistic	OSU	RU
Total yards	628	209
Passing yards	342	92
Rushing yards	286	117
Penalties	10–106	10–80
Turnovers	0	2
Time of Possession	24:34	35:26

Game Leaders

Statistic	OSU	RU
Passing	J. T. Barrett (275)	Kyle Bolin (56)
Rushing	Demario McCall (103)	Gus Edwards (43)
Receiving	Johnnie Dixon (115)	Robert Martin (36)

=== Maryland ===
Maryland at No. 10 Ohio State

Team	1	2	3	4	Total
Maryland	7	0	0	7	14
• No. 10 Ohio State	20	21	14	7	62

- Date: October 7, 2017
- Location:
  Ohio Stadium
  Columbus, OH
- Game start: 4:00 p.m. EDT
- Elapsed time: 3:29
- Game attendance: 107,180
- Game weather: Partly Cloudy
- Referee: Jerry McGinn
- TV announcers (FOX): Gus Johnson (Play-By-Play), Joel Klatt (Color) and Jenny Taft (Sideline)

The No. 10 Ohio State Buckeyes (5–1, 3–0) defeated the Maryland Terrapins (3–2, 1–1) in a Big Ten East match-up. This was Ohio State's Homecoming game. The Buckeyes have continued their undefeated streak over the Terrapins by winning by an average of 39 points.

The heavily favored Buckeyes began the game with a 9-play, 70-yard drive, capped by a 1-yard J. T. Barrett touchdown run. On the Terrapins first drive, Quarterback Max Bortenschlager, was hit from behind by DE Nick Bosa and fumbled the ball which was returned by LB Jerome Baker for a 20-yard touchdown to give the Buckeyes an early 14–0 lead. The Buckeyes' special teams woes began on the ensuing kickoff which was returned for a 100-yard touchdown by Ty Johnson to cut the Ohio State lead to 7. But, the Ohio State offense answered again by scoring an 8-yard touchdown pass from Barrett to Binjimen Victor. Following a botched PAT snap, the Buckeyes lead 20–7 at the end of the first quarter.

The Buckeyes' miscues began adding up at the beginning of the second quarter. Sean Nuernberger's 47-yard field goal was blocked, J. K. Dobbins fumbled and punter Drue Chrisman had a 22-yard punt giving Maryland great field position. Though the mistakes on special teams and offense added up, the defense kept the Maryland offense scoreless. In the final five minutes of the second half, Ohio State scored three consecutive touchdowns giving them a 41–7 halftime lead.

Maryland began the second half with a −14 yard drive that was followed by an Ohio State drive that ended with a missed 29-yard field goal attempt. The Ohio State offense recovered and scored touchdowns on three of their next four drives. Maryland's only offensive score of the day came after a Dwayne Haskins fumble at the Ohio State 27, which allowed for a four play drive, capped by a 20-yard Javon Leake run, making the final 62–14.

Ohio State finished the day with 584 total yards and held the Terrapins to only 66.

Game Statistics

Statistic	OSU	MD
Total yards	584	66
Passing yards	303	16
Rushing yards	281	50
Penalties	8–85	6–66
Turnovers	2	2
Time of Possession	32:24	27:36

Game Leaders

Statistic	OSU	MD
Passing	J. T. Barrett (261)	Max Bortenschlager (16)
Rushing	J. K. Dobbins (96)	Ty Johnson (57)
Receiving	Binjimen Victor (55)	D. J. Moore (11)

=== At Nebraska ===
No. 9 Ohio State at Nebraska

Team	1	2	3	4	Total
• No. 9 Ohio State	14	21	14	7	56
Nebraska	0	0	14	0	14

- Date: October 14, 2017
- Location:
  Memorial Stadium
  Lincoln, NE
- Game start: 7:30 p.m. EDT
- Elapsed time: 3:21
- Game attendance: 89,346
- Game weather: Overcast
- Referee: Don Capron
- TV announcers (FS1): Gus Johnson (Play-By-Play), Joel Klatt (Color) and Jenny Taft (Sideline)

The No. 9 Ohio State Buckeyes (6–1, 4–0) defeated the Nebraska Cornhuskers (3–4, 2–2) at Memorial Stadium in Lincoln, Nebraska, by a score of 56–14. This is the third consecutive defeat of their cross-divisional foe, with the last and only loss coming in 2011. Additionally, the win marked the Buckeye's 500th Big Ten Conference victory and moved them into a tie with the Cornhuskers for the third-most NCAA Division I Football Bowl Subdivision wins at 892.

The Buckeyes began the game on defense which forced a three-and-out. Following a 57-yard punt which pinned the Ohio State offense at their own 4-yard line, the Buckeye's drove 96 yards to score the game's first score that was capped by a 52-yard, J. K. Dobbins, touchdown. After another three-and-out by the Silver Bullet defense, the offense again scored on another drive that ended with a J. T. Barrett touchdown run, giving the Buckeyes a 14–0 lead at the end of the opening quarter. Ohio State scored less than 90 seconds into the second quarter, increasing their lead to 21. The Nebraska offense showed very little in the first half, gaining only five first downs on their six possessions, and the defense struggled even more by failing to stop the Buckeyes from reaching the endzone on all five of their possessions. This gave Ohio State a 35–0 halftime lead.

Ohio State once again lead a 75-yard drive to open the second half but were quickly matched by a 77-yard Tanner Lee touchdown pass to J.D. Spielman, making the score 42–7 Ohio State. The Cornhuskers would once again score on their following possession, on another Tanner Lee pass, but the score was again matched on a 15-play, 66-yard, Ohio State scoring drive. Nebraska would fail to score again while Ohio State would score once more, making the final score 56–14. Ohio State would score on eight of their nine drives and never having to punt.

J. T. Barrett scored five passing touchdowns and two rushing touchdowns, which tied his record for most touchdowns responsible for that he set in 2016. For his performance, he was named the Big Ten Offensive Player of the Week for the eighth time in his career, the Davey O'Brien national quarterback of the week and the Earl Campbell Tyler Rose Award National Player of the Week.

The Buckeyes moved up to the No. 6 spot in both the AP Poll and Coaches Poll.

Game Statistics

Statistic	OSU	NEB
Total yards	633	393
Passing yards	354	349
Rushing yards	279	44
Penalties	7–53	12–104
Turnovers	0	1
Time of Possession	35:15	24:45

Game Leaders

Statistic	OSU	NEB
Passing	J. T. Barrett (325)	Tanner Lee (303)
Rushing	J. K. Dobbins (106)	Devine Ozigbo (24)
Receiving	K. J. Hill (80)	J.D. Spielman (200)

=== Penn State ===
#2 Penn State Nittany Lions (7–0) at #6 Ohio State Buckeyes (6–1)

Quarter	1	2	3	4	Total
Penn State	14	14	7	3	38
Ohio State	3	14	3	19	39

at Ohio Stadium • Columbus, Ohio

- Date: October 28
- Game time: 3:30 p.m. EDT
- Game weather: Cloudy • 43 °F (6 °C) • Wind W 8 miles per hour (13 km/h; 7.0 kn)
- Game attendance: 109,302
- Referee: John O'Neill
- TV announcers (Fox): Gus Johnson, Joel Klatt, and Jenny Taft
- Box Score

Game information

Penn State

- Trace McSorley
  17/29, 192 Yds, 2 TD, 2 INT
  13 Rush, 49 Yds, TD
- Mike Gesicki
  6 Rec, 57 Yds

Ohio State

- J. T. Barrett
  33/39, 328 Yds, 4 TD
  17 Rush, 95 Yds
- K. J. Hill
  12 Rec, 102 Yds

The No. 6 Ohio State Buckeyes (7–1, 5–0) defeated the No. 2 Penn State Nittany Lions (7–1, 4–1) at Ohio Stadium by a score of 39–38. The Buckeyes avenged last year's loss to Penn State that gave them their only regular season loss and allowed the Nittany Lions to earn a berth over the Buckeyes in the 2016 Big Ten Football Championship Game. OSU Coach Urban Meyer is now 5–1 versus Penn State and PSU's James Franklin is 1–3 versus the Buckeyes. In all but three of the 32 match-ups, including 13 straight, at least one of the teams was ranked in the AP Top 25 poll. This game served as host to ESPN's College GameDay, and was Ohio State's third appearance this year and Penn State's second.

Special teams woes began immediately for the Buckeyes when Penn State won the opening coin toss and elected to receive the ball on the opening kickoff which resulted in a 97-yard Saquon Barkley kickoff return for a touchdown. On Ohio State's following possession, after only three plays, wide receiver Parris Campbell fumbled the ball after he was once again injured. This gave the Nittany Lion possession on their 23-yard line which led to an eventual 13-yard touchdown pass from Trace McSorley to DaeSean Hamilton. The Buckeyes found themselves in a 14-point hole at the 11:34 mark of the first quarter. After trading punts, Ohio State finally got on the scoreboard following a 38-yard Sean Nuernberger field goal to make the score 3–14. The remainder of the first quarter remained fairly quiet.

The second quarter of the game began with an 81-yard Penn State drive that resulted in a 36-yard touchdown Barkley run to give Penn State an 18-point lead with a score of 3–21. J. T. Barrett and the Ohio State offense was able to match that score with their first touchdown of the game by driving 63 yards and scoring on a 14-yard pass from Barrett to Terry McLaurin. The Buckeyes once again faced a special teams disaster on the following kickoff which was returned for 59 yards by Koa Farmer to the Ohio State 23 yard line. Two plays later McSorley ran for a 6-yard touchdown to give the Nittany Lions a 28–10 lead. Fortunately for the Buckeyes, the offense was able to travel 75 yards and a 2-yard Mike Weber touchdown with less than five minutes in the half to cut the PSU lead to 17–28. Punts were traded by both teams to end the half and Penn State went to the locker room with an impressive 11-point lead.

The Buckeyes were able to amount a 57-yard drive following the intermission that resulted in a 36-yard Nuernberger field goal to get the lead to eight, but it was quickly negated ten plays later when McSorley found the endzone again on a 37-yard touchdown pass to DeAndre Thompkins. The third quarter had no more scoring and the Nittany Lions were able to secure a 20–35 lead going into the fourth and final quarter.

On the opening drive of the fourth quarter, Barrett fumbled the ball in a botched hand off attempt to J. K. Dobbins which gave the ball to the Nittany Lions on Ohio State's 42 yard line. The Buckeye defense stepped up and forced a three-and-out which was followed by a blocked punt by Denzel Ward. Two plays later Ohio State found the endzone on a 38-yard pass from Barrett to Johnnie Dixon, which would bring the Buckeyes within eight. Unfortunately for the Buckeyes, Penn State was able to pull back ahead by 11 on a 5:23 drive that ended in a 24-yard Tyler Davis field goal. Following the Penn State score, the Buckeye offense came alive and resulted in two 55+ yard drives that ended in Barrett touchdown passes. One to Dixon and the go-ahead touchdown to Marcus Baugh. Penn State on the other hand faced two consecutive possessions of negative yards, sealing the one-point Ohio State victory.

J. T. Barrett gained a school record 423 total offensive yards during the game earning him his ninth Big Ten Offensive Player of the Week honors, while wide receiver K. J. Hill caught 12 passes, which is the fourth most in program history. The Buckeye defense was able to hold Heisman Trophy hopeful Barkley to a season low of only 44 yards rushing on 21 attempts, but his performance on special teams earned him honors for Big Ten Special Team Player of the Week.

Ohio State moved up to No. 3 in both the AP and Coaches Polls while Penn State fell to No. 7 in both. The Buckeyes took over the sole lead of the Big Ten East division following the victory and a Michigan State loss to Northwestern.

Scoring summary

Quarter	Time	Drive			Team	Scoring information	Score	
Quarter	Time	Plays	Yards	TOP	Team	Scoring information	PSU	OSU
1	14:45				Penn State	Kickoff returned 97 yards for touchdown by Saquon Barkley, Tyler Davis kick good	7	0
1	11:36	5	23	1:56	Penn State	DaeSean Hamilton 13-yard touchdown reception from Trace McSorley, Tyler Davis kick good	14	0
1	4:38	9	37	2:58	Ohio State	38-yard field goal by Sean Nuernberger	14	3
2	11:40	7	81	3:20	Penn State	Saquon Barkley 36-yard touchdown run, Tyler Davis kick good	21	3
2	9:32	5	63	2:01	Ohio State	Terry McLaurin 14-yard touchdown reception from J. T. Barrett, Sean Nuernberger kick good	21	10
2	8:06	2	23	1:08	Penn State	Trace McSorley 6-yard touchdown run, Tyler Davis kick good	28	10
2	4:56	10	75	3:10	Ohio State	Mike Weber 2-yard touchdown run, Sean Nuernberger kick good	28	17
3	11:37	10	57	3:23	Ohio State	36-yard field goal by Sean Nuernberger	28	20
3	7:25	10	70	4:09	Penn State	DeAndre Tompkins 37-yard touchdown reception from Trace McSorley, Tyler Davis kick good	35	20
4	11:05	2	47	0:34	Ohio State	Johnnie Dixon 38-yard touchdown reception from J. T. Barrett, Sean Nuernberger kick good	35	27
4	5:42	10	64	5:18	Penn State	24-yard field goal by Tyler Davis	38	27
4	4:20	5	76	1:17	Ohio State	Johnnie Dixon 10-yard touchdown reception from J. T. Barrett, 2-point run failed	38	33
4	1:48	5	58	1:19	Ohio State	Marcus Baugh 16-yard touchdown reception from J. T. Barrett, 2-point run failed	38	39
"TOP" = time of possession. For other American football terms, see Glossary of American football.							38	39

=== At Iowa ===
No. 6 Ohio State at Iowa

Team	1	2	3	4	Total
No. 6 Ohio State	10	7	0	7	24
• Iowa	10	21	7	17	55

- Date: November 4, 2017
- Location:
  Kinnick Stadium
  Iowa City, IA
- Game start: 3:30 p.m. EDT
- Elapsed time: 3:33
- Game attendance: 67,669
- Game weather: Overcast
- Referee: Ron Snodgrass
- TV announcers (ESPN): Steve Levy (Play-By-Play), Brian Griese (Color) and Todd McShay (Sideline)

The No. 6 Ohio State Buckeyes (7–2, 5–1) lost to the Iowa Hawkeyes (5–3, 2–3) in Iowa City, Iowa at Kinnick Stadium by a score of 55–24. This was the Buckeyes' first trip to Iowa since 2010 and the first time playing the Hawkeyes since 2013.

The first play of the game began a tough day for the Buckeyes when quarterback J. T. Barrett threw his first of four interceptions that was returned for an Iowa touchdown by Amani Hooker. The Buckeye offense looked to rebound by scoring two touchdowns and a field goal on their next three possessions. The Hawkeyes matched them by also scoring touchdowns on all but one of their first half drives. This gave Iowa a 31–17 lead at the half. The second half proved to be no easier on the Buckeyes as they allowed three more Iowa touchdowns and a field goal, while the Buckeyes offense only managed three first downs and one touchdown.

Ohio State fell to No. 11 in both the AP and the coaches' polls while falling to 13th in the CFP Poll. Iowa found themselves ranked for the first time in 2017 as they debuted at No. 25 in the AP Poll and No. 20 in the CFP Poll. The loss put the Buckeyes in a two-way tie at the top of the Big Ten East with their next opponent, Michigan State. Iowa quarterback, Nate Stanley, was named the Big Ten Offensive Player of the Week for his performance.

Game Statistics

Statistic	OSU	Iowa
Total yards	371	487
Passing yards	208	244
Rushing yards	163	243
Penalties	9–95	5–34
Turnovers	4	0
Time of Possession	25:09	34:51

Game Leaders

Statistic	OSU	Iowa
Passing	J. T. Barrett (208)	Nate Stanley (226)
Rushing	J. T. Barrett (63)	Akrum Wadley (118)
Receiving	Johnnie Dixon (81)	T. J. Hockenson (71)

=== No. 12 Michigan State ===
No. 12 Michigan State at No. 13 Ohio State

Team	1	2	3	4	Total
No. 12 Michigan State	0	3	0	0	3
• No. 13 Ohio State	14	21	13	0	48

- Date: November 11, 2017
- Location:
  Ohio Stadium
  Columbus, OH
- Game start: 12:00 p.m. EST
- Elapsed time: 3:20
- Game attendance: 107,011
- Game weather: Mostly cloudy
- Referee: Mike Cannon
- TV announcers (FOX): Joe Davis (Play-By-Play), Brady Quinn (Color) and Bruce Feldman (Sideline)

The No. 13 Ohio State Buckeyes (8–2, 6–1) defeated the No. 12 Michigan State Spartans (7–3, 5–2) at Ohio Stadium by a score of 48–3. OSU coach Urban Meyer moved to 4–2 versus the Spartans, while MSU coach Mark Dantonio fell to 3–6 against the Buckeyes. With the victory, Ohio State became the sole possessors of first place in the Big Ten East.

While Michigan State started on a nine-play drive that took more than five minutes off of the clock, the Buckeyes were able to force a punt, a large part due to Nick Bosa's 12-yard sack on third down. The Buckeye offense was able to form an 86-yard drive that resulted in 79 rushing yards, including a 47-yard touchdown run by Mike Weber. J. T. Barrett was able to rush for two more touchdowns as well as pass for another to give them a 28–0 lead. The Buckeye's final score of the first half came on a Weber 82-yard run on their next to-last possession, while Michigan State was able to kick a field goal as time expired following a Barrett interception. The Buckeyes would lead 35–3 at halftime. Ohio State was able to find the endzone on the third play of the second half with a 48-yard pass from Barrett to Binjimen Victor, this would be the last touchdown of the game. Ohio State would kick two Sean Nuernberger field goals on their next two possessions to increase their lead to 45.

Before this game, the largest Dantonio-Meyer match-up spread had been a 12-point OSU victory. This result was the largest defeat in the series history.

The Buckeyes moved up three spots to No. 8 in both the AP and Coaches' polls and four spots to No. 9 in the CFP poll while Michigan State fell to No. 24 in the AP poll, No. 22 in the Coaches' poll and No. 17 in the CFP poll. Weber was named Big Ten co-Offensive Player of the Week for his 162-yard and two touchdown rushing performance.

Game Statistics

Statistic	OSU	MSU
Total yards	524	195
Passing yards	189	131
Rushing yards	335	64
Penalties	2–27	5–58
Turnovers	2	3
Time of Possession	25:16	34:44

Game Leaders

Statistic	OSU	MSU
Passing	J. T. Barrett (183)	Brian Lewerke (131)
Rushing	Mike Weber (162)	L. J. Scott (30)
Receiving	Binjimen Victor (65)	Cody White (42)

=== Illinois ===
Illinois at No. 9 Ohio State

Team	1	2	3	4	Total
Illinois	0	0	7	7	14
• No. 9 Ohio State	28	10	7	7	52

- Date: November 18, 2017
- Location:
  Ohio Stadium
  Columbus, OH
- Game start: 3:30 p.m. EST
- Elapsed time: 3:16
- Game attendance: 105,282
- Game weather: Cloudy/Heavy Rain
- Referee: Daniel Capron
- TV announcers (ABC): Steve Levy (Play-By-Play), Brian Griese (Color) and Todd McShay (Sideline)

The No. 9 Ohio State Buckeyes (9–2, 7–1) defeated the Illinois Fighting Illini (2–9, 0–8) by a score of 52–14 to end their Big Ten West match ups for the 2017 regular season and clinch the Big Ten East title as well as a berth in the Big Ten Football Championship Game. Ohio State was awarded the Illibuck for the ninth consecutive time, which has been given out since 1925, making it the second oldest trophy between Big Ten football programs. Urban Meyer is now 5–0 against the Illini, while this was Illinois coach Lovie Smith's first game against the Buckeyes.

The Buckeye offense came out and struck quickly by scoring on their first drive by a 25-yard Mike Weber touchdown run. Ohio State's defense, matched the effort by forcing what would be the first of many three-and-outs. The following drive also resulted in a touchdown following a 6 play, 71-yard drive, capped by J. T. Barrett's ninth rushing touchdown of the season. Ohio State would go on to score two more touchdowns in the first quarter, one by a pass from Barrett to Binjimen Victor and the other by a 43-yard Weber run. Illinois would fail to convert a first down, giving the Buckeyes a 28–0 lead at the end of the first quarter.

Ohio State was able to add a 33-year Sean Nuernberger field goal at the beginning of the second period, followed soon after by another OSU drive that ended with a J. K. Dobbins touchdown run, which would be the last time the primary starters would see the game in the first half. Ohio State would fail to score on a drive for the first time during their last possession, while Illinois would gain their only first down of the opening half. Ohio State would go into halftime with a 38–0 lead as heavy rain began to fall.

Ohio State's defense mounted another three-and-out to start the second half, but the offense was apparently effected by the rain when back-up quarterback Dwayne Haskins fumbled the ball and it was returned 54-yards by Ahmari Hayes for Illinois' first score. Ohio State's offensive starters went back into the game but were forced to punt. Luckily for the Buckeyes, the punt was muffed and recovered by Ohio State that led to a Barrett touchdown pass to tight end Marcus Baugh. Ohio State led 45–7 at this point and would be the last time the offensive starters saw the field. The teams traded punts to close out the third quarter.

After a short performance by back-up quarterback, Joe Burrow, Haskins went back in the game which resulted in a 21-yard touchdown pass to Victor. The Illini would match the result with their only offensive touchdown on a 65-yard drive to make the score 52–14. Neither team would score again to make that the final.

Ohio State would only allow three first downs and it was the sixth game of the season that they allowed less than 100 rushing yards and the fifth game they allowed less than 100 passing yards.

Game Statistics

Statistic	OSU	ILL
Total yards	543	105
Passing yards	218	16
Rushing yards	325	89
Penalties	7–68	7–55
Turnovers	1	1
Time of Possession	37:16	22:44

Game Leaders

Statistic	OSU	ILL
Passing	J. T. Barrett (141)	Chayce Crouch (16)
Rushing	Mike Weber (108)	Dre Brown (76)
Receiving	Parris Campbell (59)	Reggie Corbin (8)

=== At Michigan ===
No. 9 Ohio State at Michigan

Team	1	2	3	4	Total
• No. 9 Ohio State	0	14	7	10	31
Michigan	7	7	6	0	20

- Date: November 25, 2017
- Location:
  Michigan Stadium
  Ann Arbor, MI
- Game start: 12:00 p.m. EST
- Elapsed time: 3:42
- Game attendance: 112,028
- Game weather: Cloudy/Light Snow Flurries
- Referee: Ron Snodgrass
- TV announcers (FOX): Gus Johnson (Play-By-Play), Joel Klatt (Color), Jenny Taft (Sideline)

The 114th edition of the Michigan–Ohio State football rivalry, colloquially known as "The Game", took place at Michigan Stadium between the No. 9 Ohio State Buckeyes (10–2, 8–1) and the Michigan Wolverines (8–4, 5–4). The No. 9 Ohio State Buckeyes defeated the Michigan Wolverines by a score of 31–20.

Ohio State and Michigan both started off slowly by forcing three-and-outs on each team's opening drive before the Wolverines mounted a nearly six minute, 13-play, 77-yard drive that resulted in a touchdown. Ohio State was again forced with another three-and-out that was followed by a Michigan drive that ended in a punt that pinned the Buckeye's deep. Ohio State was forced to punt and was returned 42-yards by Michigan wide receiver Donovan Peoples-Jones, additionally, Ohio State committed a block in the back which gave the Wolverines the ball at the five-yard line. Michigan was able to take a 14–0 lead when quarterback John O'Korn completed a three-yard pass to Sean McKeon. Ohio State was held to −6 yard in the first quarter and was the first time since 2010 that Ohio State had been held to negative yardage in a quarter. The Ohio State offense and the rushing attack of J. T. Barrett and J. K. Dobbins came alive on the following drive when the two gained 71 yards on the ground that ended with a 21-yard Barrett touchdown run. Following a Michigan punt, Ohio State was able to move the ball again behind Barrett when he ran for 26 yards and threw a 25-yard touchdown pass to tight end Marcus Baugh, tying the game at 14. Neither team would score again in the first half.

Ohio State again started off slow by being forced to consecutive three-and-outs, while Michigan was able to score on a 2-yard Karan Higdon touchdown run. Ohio State linebacker, Chris Worley, was able to block the PAT and Michigan led 20–14. The Buckeyes answered back when Ohio State mounted a 78-yard touchdown drive capped by a 1-yard Dobbins touchdown run. Unfortunately for the Buckeyes, Barrett was injured during the drive and was forced out for the remainder of the game. RS Freshman, Dwayne Haskins gained 24 yards on the ground and 31 in the air on the drive that gave the Buckeyes a one-point, 21–20 lead. The Wolverines were unable to capitalize on the following possession and Ohio State was able to tack on a 44-yard Sean Nuernberger field goal, increasing the lead to four. Michigan drove the ball 36-yards on their next possession, but turned the ball over on downs following an O'Korn sack and two additional incomplete passes. The Buckeyes drove again and Nuernberger missed only his third field goal of the season on a 43-yard attempt. The following play, O'Korn committed the only turnover of the game when he threw an interception to Jordan Fuller. On Ohio State's next possession, Dobbins ran for 41 yards and Mike Weber was able to seal the game by scoring a 25-yard touchdown run with 1:44 remaining in the game, to make what would be the final score, 31–20.

Michigan coach Jim Harbaugh dropped to 0–3 versus the Buckeyes, while Urban Meyer moved to 6–0 against the Wolverines. The current winning streak is tied for the second-longest in the series and tied for the longest for Ohio State with the 2004–2009 games. J. T. Barrett became the only quarterback in the series history to have four wins versus the other and moved Ohio State into first place in the number of all-time Big Ten wins. Ohio State clinched their first outright divisional title since 2014 and faced Wisconsin in the Big Ten Championship Game. Ohio State's ranking would remain unchanged in the AP Poll at No. 8 and they would move up one spot to No. 7 in the Coaches Poll.

Game Statistics

Statistic	OSU	MICH
Total yards	350	295
Passing yards	124	195
Rushing yards	226	100
Penalties	9–75	6–50
Turnovers	0	1
Time of Possession	31:17	28:43

Game Leaders

Statistic	OSU	MICH
Passing	Dwayne Haskins (94)	John O'Korn (195)
Rushing	J. K. Dobbins (101)	Chris Evans (67)
Receiving	K. J. Hill (53)	Kekoa Crawford (57)

=== Vs. No. 3 Wisconsin (Big Ten Championship) ===
No. 8 Ohio State vs. No. 3 Wisconsin

Team	1	2	3	4	Total
• No. 8 Ohio State	14	7	3	3	27
No. 3 Wisconsin	7	3	3	8	21

- Date: December 2, 2017
- Location:
  Lucas Oil Stadium
  Indianapolis, IN
- Game start: 8:20 p.m. EST
- Elapsed time: 3:43
- Game attendance: 65,886
- Game weather: N/A (Game indoors with retractable roof closed)
- Referee: Don Willard
- TV announcers (FOX): Gus Johnson (Play-By-Play), Joel Klatt (Analyst) and Jenny Taft (Sidelines)

The No. 8 Ohio State Buckeyes (11–2, 8–1) defeated the No. 3 Wisconsin Badgers (12–1, 9–0) 27–21 at Lucas Oil Stadium in the Big Ten Championship. Urban Meyer is now 5–0 versus the Badgers, with two of the victories coming in overtime. Paul Chryst fell to 0–2 versus the Buckeyes. This was Ohio State's third appearance in the Championship game and Wisconsin's fifth, including their second straight.

The Badgers began the game with the ball and were forced to punt after a three-and-out with the reverse result happening on the Buckeyes' first possession as well. Wisconsin would then follow with a 55-yard drive that ended with an interception in Wisconsin's redzone thrown by Alex Hornibrook to Denzel Ward at OSU's 4-yard line. J. T. Barrett would rush for a total of 12 yards before hitting Terry McLaurin for an 84-yard touchdown pass giving the Buckeyes an early 7–0 lead. The pass from Barrett to McLaurin was the longest play committed against the Badgers' defense all season. The following Wisconsin drive lasted for 7 plays and 44 yards and a punt trapped the Buckeyes on their own two-yard line. Barrett would go on to throw an interception to Wisconsin linebacker Andrew Van Ginkel that was returned for a touchdown, tying the game at 7–7. Ohio State would bounce back quickly and score on a Barrett to Parris Campbell, 57-yard touchdown pass, once again regaining the lead 14–7 and bringing an end to the first quarter.

Ohio State wand Wisconsin traded punts to open the second quarter, but the Buckeyes would strike again with a Barrett 1-yard touchdown run that was set up by a 77-yard rush by J. K. Dobbins. On Ohio State's second possession of the second quarter, Mike Weber would commit his first fumble of the year that was recovered by Van Ginkel that would lead to a 28-yard field goal, making the score 21–10 in favor of the Buckeyes. Ohio State would attempt to add to their lead, but Sean Nuernberger's 43-yard field goal was blocked as time expired.

While Ohio State couldn't amount a drive to open the second half, Wisconsin was able to convert a 46-yard field goal to narrow the lead to 8, which was quickly matched by the Buckeyes thanks to a 53-yard Dobbins run and a 27-yard Nuernberger field goal. Punts were traded after several three-and-outs both teams until Wisconsin began an 11-play, 52-yard drive that started with a Barrett interception that ended with a 1-yard touchdown run by Chris James and a successful 2-point conversion. The score narrowed to 24–21 favoring Ohio State. The Buckeyes followed with a 15-play drive that took 5:20 off the clock and tacked on a 20-yard Ohio State field goal to increase the lead back to 6. The Buckeyes and the Badgers again traded punts and with 1:50 left in the game, Wisconsin would begin their final offensive drive. Wisconsin would secure two first downs bringing them to mid-field. A holding penalty on Wisconsin on first down would force a first and 20. Hornibrook would throw three incomplete passes until he threw an interception to Damon Webb. Ohio State was able to run out the clock and secure their 36th Big Ten Title.

J. K. Dobbins would be named the MVP of the game which was the first time a Freshman earned the award. He would also become the all-time leading Freshman rusher in Ohio State history, passing Maurice Clarett. Ohio State would go on to be ranked No. 5 in the final CFP poll and miss the playoffs while Wisconsin would fall to No. 6. It was announced on December 3, that No. 5 Ohio State would face No. 8 USC in the Cotton Bowl Classic.

Game Statistics

Statistic	OSU	WISC
Total yards	449	298
Passing yards	211	238
Rushing yards	238	60
Penalties	5–48	6–55
Turnovers	3	2
Time of Possession	25:65	34:06

Game Leaders

Statistic	OSU	WISC
Passing	J. T. Barrett (211)	Alex Hornibrook (229)
Rushing	J. K. Dobbins (174)	Jonathan Taylor (42)
Receiving	Terry McLaurin (92)	Troy Fumagalli (45); Austin Ramesh (45)

=== Vs. No. 8 USC (Cotton Bowl Classic) ===
No. 8 USC vs. No. 5 Ohio State

Team	1	2	3	4	Total
No. 8 USC	0	7	0	0	7
• No. 5 Ohio State	7	17	0	0	24

- Date: December 29, 2017
- Location:
  AT&T Stadium
  Arlington, Texas
- Game start: 8:30 p.m. EST
- Elapsed time: 3:45
- Game attendance: 67,510
- Game weather: N/A (Game indoors with retractable roof closed)
- Referee: David Smith
- TV announcers (ESPN): Bob Wischusen (Play-By-Play), Brock Huard (Analyst) and Allison Williams (sideline)

The No. 5 Ohio State Buckeyes (12–2) defeated the No. 8 USC Trojans (11–3) 24–7 at AT&T Stadium in Arlington, Texas in the Cotton Bowl Classic. This was the first time that the Buckeyes defeated the Trojans since 1974, which broke a seven-game USC win-streak.

Ohio State and their Silver Bullet defense proved to be a tough match for USC. On the third play of the game, Ohio State's Kendall Sheffield was able to strip the ball from USC wide receiver Deontay Burnett which was recovered and advanced 20 yards by Ohio State's Damon Webb. This set up a short five-play drive that resulted in a J. T. Barrett 1-yard touchdown run. Punts were traded a few times by both teams until the Buckeyes produced an 83-yard drive that tacked on a 26-yard Sean Nuernberger field goal at the beginning of the second quarter to five OSU a 10–0 lead. The following play, Sam Darnold threw an interception to Ohio State's Damon Webb which was returned for a 23-yard touchdown giving the Buckeyes a 17–0 lead. Again, both teams traded punts and USC fumbled the ball which set up a 59-yard Buckeye drive that ended with a 28-yard Barrett touchdown run giving the Buckeyes a 24-point lead. USC was able to find the scoreboard in the second quarter when K. J. Hill fumbled a punt return which set up a 15-yard drive, capped by a one-yard Ronald Jones II touchdown run. The score at half would be 24–7 favoring Ohio State.

Offensively, the Buckeyes remained quiet the second half by having all but one drive ending in a punt. USC was able to drive deep into Buckeye territory three times, but a missed field goal, a fumble and a failed fourth-down conversion didn't allow the Trojans to score any points. The final score would end as 24–7.

Barrett and Webb were named the Offensive and Defensive MVPs respectively. Barrett also passed Drew Brees for the Big Ten record of most offensive yards in a career.

Game Statistics

Statistic	OSU	USC
Total yards	277	413
Passing yards	114	356
Rushing yards	163	57
Penalties	3–30	3–35
Turnovers	1	4
Time of Possession	25:04	34:56

Game Leaders

Statistic	OSU	USC
Passing	J. T. Barrett (114)	Sam Darnold (356)
Rushing	J. T. Barrett (66)	Ronald Jones II (64)
Receiving	Austin Mack (56)	Deontay Burnett (139)

== Early departures ==
- WR Noah Brown – Declared for the NFL Draft
- CB Gareon Conley – Declared for the NFL Draft
- FS Malik Hooker – Declared for the NFL Draft
- CB Marshon Lattimore – Declared for the NFL Draft
- LB Raekwon McMillan – Declared for the NFL Draft
- RB Curtis Samuel – Declared for the NFL Draft

== Roster ==
2017 Ohio State Buckeyes football team roster
Players
Coaches
Offense

Pos.	#	Name	Class
WR	1	Johnnie Dixon	Jr
RB	2	J. K. Dobbins	Fr
QB	7	Dwayne Haskins	Fr
WR	8	Trevon Grimes	Fr
WR	9	Binjimen Victor	So
QB	10	Joe Burrow	So
WR	11	Austin Mack	So
WR	12	Brendan Skalitzky	So
WR	14	K. J. Hill	So
WR	15	Jaylen Harris	Fr
QB	16	J. T. Barrett (C)	Sr
QB	18	Tate Martell	Fr
WR	21	Parris Campbell (C)	Jr
TE	24	Kierre Hawkins	Fr
RB	25	Mike Weber	So
RB	26	Antonio Williams	So
RB	28	Jordan Leasure	So
RB	30	Demario McCall	Fr
RB	35	Alex Backenstoe	Jr
TE	37	Derrick Malone	Jr
RB	46	Ke'Von Huguely	Jr
OL	50	Nathan Brock	So
OL	52	Wyatt Davis	Fr
OL	54	Billy Price (C)	Sr
OL	59	Isaiah Prince	Jr
OL	60	Blake Pfenning	Jr
OL	61	Gavin Cupp	Fr
OL	62	Pahl Brandon	Jr
OL	63	Kevin Woidke	Jr
OL	64	Jack Wohlabaugh	Fr
OL	66	Malcolm Pridgeon	Jr
G	69	Matthew Burrell	So
OL	71	Josh Myers	Fr
G	73	Michael Jordan	So
OT	74	Jamarco Jones	Sr
OL	75	Thayer Munford	Fr
OT	76	Branden Bowen	So
OT	77	Kevin Feder	So
OL	78	Demetrius Knox	Jr
OL	79	Brady Taylor	Jr
WR	80	Brendon White	Fr
TE	81	Jake Hausmann	Fr
WR	83	Terry McLaurin (C)	Jr
TE	84	Brock Davin	So
TE	85	Marcus Baugh	Sr
WR	87	Elijah Gardiner	Fr
TE	88	A. J. Alexander	So
TE	89	Luke Farrell	Fr

Defense

Pos.	#	Name	Class
CB	1	Jeff Okudah	Fr
DE	2	Chase Young	Fr
CB	3	Damon Arnette	So
S	4	Jordan Fuller	So
LB	5	Baron Browning	Fr
DE	6	Sam Hubbard (C)	Jr
S	7	Damon Webb	Sr
DT	9	Jashon Cornell	So
CB	8	Kendall Sheffield	So
CB	10	Amir Riep	Fr
DE	11	Jalyn Holmes (C)	Sr
CB	12	Denzel Ward	Jr
DE	13	Rashod Berry	So
S	14	Isaiah Pryor	Fr
DB	15	Wayne Davis	Fr
LB	16	Keandre Jones	So
LB	17	Jerome Baker	Jr
CB	17	C. J. Saunders	Jr
DE	18	Jonathon Cooper	Fr
S	19	Eric Glover-Williams	Jr
LB	20	Pete Werner	Fr
CB	21	Marcus Williamson	Fr
S	23	Jahsen Wint	Fr
CB	24	Shaun Wade	Fr
CB	25	Trevon Forte	Sr
LB	30	Jared Drake	Jr
LB	33	Dante Booker	Sr
LB	32	Tuf Borland	Fr
S	34	Erick Smith	Sr
LB	35	Chris Worley (C)	Sr
LB	36	Zach Turnure	GS
S	37	Elijaah Goins	Sr
D	38	Logan Kelleher	Sr
LB	39	Malik Harrison	So
LB	41	Hayden Jester	So
DL	42	Darius Slade	Jr
LB	43	Nick Conner	So
CB	46	Cin'Quan Haney	Sr
LB	47	Justin Hilliard	So
DL	52	Noah Donald	So
DT	53	DaVon Hamilton	So
DT	55	Malik Barrow	Fr
DT	58	Joshua Alabi	So
DL	59	Tyquan Lewis (C)	Sr
DL	67	Robert Landers	So
DT	77	Michael Hill	Sr
DL	86	Dre'Mont Jones	So
DL	93	Tracy Sprinkle (C)	Sr
DL	94	Dylan Thompson	Jr
DL	97	Nick Bosa	So
DT	98	Jerron Cage	Fr

Special teams

Pos.	#	Name	Class
LS	49	Liam McCullough	So
K	90	Bryan Kristan	Jr
P	91	Drue Chrisman	So
K	95	Blake Haubeil	Fr
K	96	Sean Nuernberger	Jr

Head coach

- Urban Meyer

Coordinators/assistant coaches

Offense

- Kevin Wilson (offensive coordinator / tight ends coach)
- Tony Alford (assistant head coach / running backs)
- Ryan Day (Co-offensive Coordinator / quarterbacks)
- Zack Smith (wide receivers)
- Greg Studrawa (offensive line)

Defense

- Greg Schiano (defensive coordinator / associate head coach)
- Kerry Coombs (assistant defensive coordinator / special teams coordinator / cornerbacks)
- Bill Davis (linebackers)
- Larry Johnson (assistant head coach / defensive line)

Staff

- Louie Addazio (graduate assistant – offense)
- Sean Buckley (quality control coach – offense)
- Ryan Crow (graduate assistant – defense)
- Corey Dennis (graduate assistant – offense)
- Tim Hinton (executive director for football relations/special assistant to HC)
- Randall Joyner (graduate assistant – defense)
- Mickey Marotti (assistant athletic director for football sports performance)
- Mark Pantoni (director of player personnel)
- Adam Scheier (quality control coach – kicking)
- Ryan Stamper (director of player development)
- Matt Thurin (quality control coach – defense)
- Brian Voltolini (director of football operations)

Legend

- (C) Team captain
- (S) Suspended
- (I) Ineligible
- Injured
- Redshirt

Roster
Last update: May 20, 2017

=== Depth chart ===
Defense

FS
7 Damon Webb
14 Isaiah Pryor

LB	MLB	LB
32 Tuf Borland	35 Chris Worley	17 Jerome Baker
33 Dante Booker	5 Baron Browning	39 Malik Harrison

SS
4 Jordan Fuller
34 Erick Smith

CB
12 Denzel Ward
29 Jeff Okudah

DE	DT	DT	DE
97 Nick Bosa 59 Tyquan Lewis	93 Tracy Sprinkle	86 Dre'Mont Jones	6 Sam Hubbard
2 Chase Young	53 DaVon Hamilton	9 Jashon Cornell	11 Jalyn Holmes

CB
3 Damon Arnette
8 Kendall Sheffield

Offense

WR
83 Terry McLaurin
1 Johnnie Dixon

H-Back
21 Parris Campbell
14 K. J. Hill

LT	LG	C	RG	RT
74 Jamarco Jones	73 Michael Jordan	54 Billy Price	78 Demetris Knox	59 Isaiah Prince
58 Joshua Albai	66 Malcolm Pridgeon	79 Brady Tayor	69 Mathew Burrell	75 Thayer Munford

TE
85 Marcus Baugh
13 Rashod Berry

WR
9 Binjimen Victor
11 Austin Mack

QB
16 J. T. Barrett
7 Dwayne Haskins

Special teams

RB
2 J. K. Dobbins
25 Mike Weber

== Coaching changes ==
- OC/OL Ed Warriner left to become offensive line coach at Minnesota
- Co-OC/QB Tim Beck left to become the offensive coordinator at Texas under coach Tom Herman, a previous offensive coordinator at Ohio State
- Co-DC/LB Luke Fickell left to become the head coach at Cincinnati; Co-DC Greg Schiano then became the sole defensive coordinator
- Kevin Wilson, former Indiana head coach, hired as offensive coordinator and tight ends coach
- Ryan Day hired as quarterbacks coach and co-offensive coordinator
- Bill Davis hired as linebackers coach

== Awards and honors ==
Weekly Awards
Player	Award	Date Awarded	Ref.
J. T. Barrett	Big Ten Co-offensive Player of the Week	September 4, 2017	
J. K. Dobbins	Big Ten Freshman of the Week	September 4, 2017	
J. K. Dobbins	The Earl Campbell Tyler Rose Award National Player of the Week	September 4, 2017	
J. K. Dobbins	Big Ten Co-Freshman of the Week	September 18, 2017	
J. T. Barrett	Athlon Sports Offensive Player of the Week	October 15, 2017	
J. T. Barrett	Big Ten Offensive Player of the Week	October 16, 2017	
J. T. Barrett	Rose Bowl Big Ten Player of the Week	October 16, 2017	
J. T. Barrett	The Earl Campbell Tyler Rose Award National Player of the Week	October 17, 2017	
J. T. Barrett	Davey O'Brien Quarterback of the Week	October 17, 2017	
J. T. Barrett	CBS Sports National Player of the Week	October 29, 2017	
J. T. Barrett	Athlon Sports Offensive Player of the Week	October 29, 2017	
J. T. Barrett	Big Ten Offensive Player of the Week	October 30, 2017	
J. T. Barrett	Rose Bowl Big Ten Player of the Week	October 30, 2017	
J. T. Barrett	The Earl Campbell Tyler Rose Award National Player of the Week	October 31, 2017	
J. T. Barrett	Davey O'Brien Quarterback of the Week	October 31, 2017	
Mike Weber	Big Ten Co-offensive Player of the Week	November 13, 2017	
Mike Weber	Rose Bowl Big Ten Player of the Week	November 13, 2017	
Sam Hubbard	Big Ten Defensive Player of the Week	November 27, 2017	
J. K. Dobbins	Grange-Griffin Championship Game MVP	December 2, 2018	

Individual Yearly Awards
Player	Award/Honors
J. T. Barrett	Griese-Brees Big Ten Quarterback of the Year
J. T. Barrett	Maxwell Award Semifinalist
J. T. Barrett	Johnny Unitas Golden Arm Award Finalist
J. T. Barrett	Davey O'Brien Award Finalist
J. T. Barrett	Manning Award Finalist
J. T. Barrett	Earl Campbell Tyler Rose Award Finalist
Jerome Baker	Butkus Award Semifinalist
Nick Bosa	Smith-Brown Big Ten Defensive Lineman of the Year
Nick Bosa	Bednarik Award Semifinalist
Tyquan Lewis	Lott Impact Trophy Quarter-Finalist
Billy Price	Rimington-Pace Big Ten Offensive Lineman of the Year
Billy Price	Rimington Trophy
Billy Price	Outland Trophy Semifinalist
Tracy Sprinkle	Big Ten Sportsmanship Honoree
Denzel Ward	Thorpe Award Semifinalist

All-Conference Honors
Player	Position	Media Vote	Coaches Vote	AP	Athlon
Damon Arnette	CB	HM	–	-	–
Jerome Baker	LB	HM	HM	-	–
J. T. Barrett	QB	1st Team	1st Team	1st Team	1st Team
Marcus Baugh	TE	HM	HM	-	–
Nick Bosa	DE	1st Team	1st Team	1st Team	1st Team
Parris Campbell	KR/PR; WR	2nd Team –	3rd Team; 3rd Team	- -	2nd Team; 3rd Team
Drue Chrisman	P	3rd Team	3rd Team	-	3rd Team
Johnnie Dixon	WR	HM	–	-	–
J. K. Dobbins	RB	2nd Team	2nd Team	2nd Team	1st Team
Jordan Fuller	S	HM	3rd Team	-	–
K. J. Hill	WR	HM	HM	-	–
Jalyn Holmes	DE	HM	HM	-	–
Sam Hubbard	DE	2nd Team	2nd Team	-	2nd Team
Dre'Mont Jones	DT	HM	3rd Team	1st Team	2nd Team
Jamarco Jones	OT	1st Team	1st Team	1st Team	1st Team
Michael Jordan	OG	2nd Team	1st Team	1st Team	2nd Team
Tyquan Lewis	DT	1st Team	1st Team	1st Team	1st Team
Sean Nuernberger	K	3rd Team	3rd Team	-	–
Billy Price	C	1st Team	1st Team	1st Team	1st Team
Isaiah Prince	OT	3rd Team	3rd Team	-	3rd Team
Denzel Ward	CB	1st Team	2nd Team	2nd Team	1st Team
Damon Webb	S	3rd Team	HM	-	–
Mike Weber	RB	HM	HM	-	–
Chris Worley	LB	HM	HM	-	–

NCAA Recognized All-American Honors
Player	Position	AFCA	AP	FWAA	Sporting News	WCFF	Designation
Nick Bosa	DE	1st Team	2nd Team	–	–	2nd Team	–
Billy Price	C	1st Team	1st Team	1st Team	1st Team	1st Team	Unanimous
Denzel Ward	CB	1st Team	1st Team	2nd Team	1st Team	–	Consensus

*The NCAA and Ohio State only recognize the AP, AFCA, FWAA, Sporting News and WCFF All-American teams to determine if a player is a Consensus or Unanimous All-American. To be named a Consensus All-American, a player must be named first team in three polls and to be Unanimous, they must be named first team in all five.

Other All-American Honors
Player	Position	Athletic	Athlon	Bleacher Report	CBS Sports	CFN	ESPN	FOX Sports	Phil Steele	Scout	SI	USA Today
J. T. Barrett	QB	–	–	–	–	HM	–				–	–
Nick Bosa	DE	–	2nd Team	–	2nd Team	–	–				–	–
Drue Chrisman	P	–	–	–	–	HM	–				–	–
J. K. Dobbins	All-purpose	–	–	–	–	–	Freshman				–	–
Jamarco Jones	OL	–	3rd Team	–	–	–	–	–	–	–	–	–
Billy Price	C	–	1st Team	1st Team	2nd Team	1st Team	1st Team				1st Team	1st Team
Denzel Ward	CB	1st Team	1st Team	1st Team	1st Team	–	1st Team				–	1st Team

== Players in the 2018 NFL draft ==
Player	Position	Round	Pick	NFL club
Denzel Ward	CB	1	4	Cleveland Browns
Billy Price	C	1	21	Cincinnati Bengals
Tyquan Lewis	DE	2	64	Indianapolis Colts
Jerome Baker	LB	3	73	Miami Dolphins
Sam Hubbard	DE	3	77	Cincinnati Bengals
Jalyn Holmes	DE	4	102	Minnesota Vikings
Jamarco Jones	OT	5	168	Seattle Seahawks
