= K. J. Hill =

American football player (born 1997)

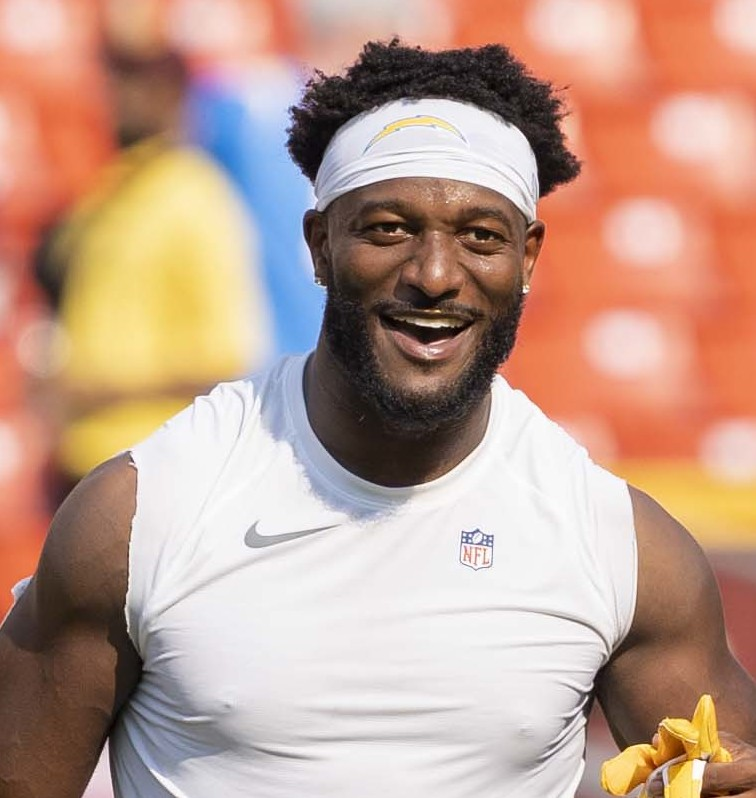
- Hill with the Los Angeles Chargers in 2021

South Florida Bulls
- Title: Offensive analyst
- CFL status: American

Personal information
- Born: September 15, 1997 (age 29); Little Rock, Arkansas, U.S.
- Listed height: 6 ft 0 in (1.83 m)
- Listed weight: 195 lb (88 kg)

Career information
- High school: North Little Rock (North Little Rock, Arkansas)
- College: Ohio State (2015–2019)
- NFL draft: 2020: 7th round, 220th overall pick

Career history

Playing
- Los Angeles Chargers (2020–2021); Winnipeg Blue Bombers (2024)*
- * Offseason or practice squad member only

Coaching
- South Florida Bulls (2026–present) Offensive analyst

Awards and highlights
- Third-team All-Big Ten (2018)

Career NFL statistics
- Receptions: 10
- Receiving yards: 103
- Return yards: 181
- Stats at Pro Football Reference

Reanard O’Keith "K. J." Hill Jr. (born September 15, 1997) is an American football coach and former player who is an offensive analyst for the South Florida Bulls. He played professionally as a wide receiver in the National Football League (NFL).

Hill played high school football at North Little Rock High School in North Little Rock, Arkansas. He played college football for the Ohio State Buckeyes. He is the second all-time leading receiver for the Buckeyes with 201 career receptions.

== Early life ==
Playing at North Little Rock High School, Hill committed to Ohio State on February 4, 2015, choosing the Buckeyes over Alabama and Arkansas, among others. He received approximately 20 scholarship offers from Division I colleges before ultimately signing with Ohio State. Hill had verbally committed to Arkansas in August 2014, but changed his commitment following the departure of Arkansas’ offensive coordinator Jim Chaney.

Coming out of high school, Hill was a consensus 4-star receiver who was named a U.S. Army All-American. Hill was the No. 1 player in the state of Arkansas, and received a No. 16 rating by ESPN and 247Sports and a No. 18 rating by Rivals for receivers. Additionally, Hill was a highly regarded basketball player.

== College career ==
In his first year at Ohio State, Hill redshirted, making him eligible for a fifth-year. After redshirting the 2015 season, Hill had 18 catches for more than 250 yards and one touchdown in 2016. Hill led Ohio State receivers (10 or more catches) with a 14.6 yards-per-reception average. He played in 11 of 13 games in 2016, missing two with an ankle injury.

During his sophomore season in 2017, he led the team in receptions with 56 and was second in yards with 549. During the game against Penn State, Hill had a career-best 12 receptions, which was the fourth-highest total in school history. Throughout the season, Hill also served as the team's primary punt returner with 26 returns for 144 yards (5.5 average).

The 2018 season was award-winning for Hill, where he was named as an all-Big Ten Conference Honorable Mention for his 70-catch, 885-yard, six-touchdown season. In a win over Minnesota, Hill set a career high with 187 receiving yards, the eighth-highest total in school history, and two touchdowns, off nine receptions. Hill had played in 39 games and caught passes in 34 consecutive games.

Following his junior year, there was speculation that Hill would declare for the NFL draft. On January 8, 2019, Hill announced on Twitter that he would return saying, “With the guidance and mentorship of Cris Carter and my family, I have decided to take one last ride with my brothers, my coaches, and you, Buckeye Nation!”

== Professional career ==
Pre-draft measurables
Height	Weight	Arm length	Hand span	Wingspan	40-yard dash	10-yard split	20-yard split	Vertical jump	Broad jump	Bench press
5 ft 11 7/8 in (1.83 m)	196 lb (89 kg)	29 1/8 in (0.74 m)	9 1/4 in (0.23 m)	6 ft 0 1/2 in (1.84 m)	4.60 s	1.59 s	2.68 s	32.5 in (0.83 m)	9 ft 6 in (2.90 m)	17 reps
All values from NFL Combine

=== Los Angeles Chargers ===
Hill was selected by the Los Angeles Chargers in the seventh round with the 220th overall pick of the 2020 NFL draft. In Week 3 of the 2020 season, against the Carolina Panthers, he made his first professional reception in the 21–16 loss.

On October 21, 2021, Hill was waived by the Chargers and re-signed to the practice squad. His practice squad contract expired upon the end of the 2021 regular season.

=== Winnipeg Blue Bombers ===
On February 27, 2024, Hill signed with the Winnipeg Blue Bombers of the Canadian Football League (CFL). On May 17, Hill was released in early round of cuts at Blue Bombers training camp.

== Career statistics ==
College statistics
Year	Team	Receiving				
Year	Team	Rec	Yards	Avg	TD	Long
2015	Ohio State	Redshirt				
2016	Ohio State	18	262	14.6	1	47
2017	Ohio State	56	549	9.8	3	29
2018	Ohio State	70	885	12.6	6	42
2019	Ohio State	57	636	11.2	10	53
Totals		201	2,332	11.6	20	53
