= 2017 All-America college football team =

Official list of the best college football players of 2017

The 2017 All-America college football team includes the players of American college football who have been honored by various selector organizations as the best players at their respective positions. The selector organizations award the "All-America" honor annually following the conclusion of the fall college football season. The original All-America team was the 1889 All-America college football team selected by Caspar Whitney. In 1950, The National Collegiate Athletic Bureau, which is the National Collegiate Athletic Association's (NCAA) service bureau, compiled the first list of All-Americans. This list included the first-team selections on teams created for a national audience. These teams received national circulation with the intent of recognizing selections made from viewpoints that were nationwide. Since 1957, College Sports Information Directors of America (CoSIDA) has bestowed Academic All-American recognition on male and female athletes in Divisions I, II, and III of the NCAA as well as National Association of Intercollegiate Athletics athletes, including all NCAA championship sports.

The 2017 All-America college football team is composed of the following All-America first teams chosen by the following selector organizations: Associated Press (AP), Football Writers Association of America (FWAA), American Football Coaches Association (AFCA), Walter Camp Foundation (WCFF), The Sporting News (TSN), Sports Illustrated (SI), USA Today (USAT) ESPN, CBS Sports (CBS), College Football News (CFN), Scout.com, Athlon Sports, and Fox Sports (FOX).

Currently, the NCAA compiles consensus all-America teams in the sports of Division I-FBS football and Division I men's basketball using a point system computed from All-America teams named by coaches associations or media sources. Players are chosen against other players playing at their position only. To be selected a consensus All-American, players must be chosen to the first team on at least two of the five official selectors as recognized by the NCAA. Second- and third-team honors are used to break ties. Players named first-team by all five selectors are deemed unanimous All-Americans. Currently, the NCAA recognizes All-Americans selected by the AP, AFCA, FWAA, TSN, and the WCFF to determine consensus and unanimous All-Americans.

Twenty-seven players were recognized as consensus All-Americans for 2017, 14 of them being unanimous. Unanimous selections are followed by an asterisk (*).

2017 Consensus All-Americans
Name	Position	Year	University
Baker Mayfield*	Quarterback	Senior	Oklahoma
Bryce Love*	Running back	Junior	Stanford
Rashaad Penny	Running back	Senior	San Diego State
Michael Gallup	Wide receiver	Senior	Colorado State
Anthony Miller	Wide receiver	Senior	Memphis
James Washington*	Wide receiver	Senior	Oklahoma State
Mark Andrews*	Tight end	Junior	Oklahoma
Orlando Brown Jr.*	Offensive line	Junior	Oklahoma
Mike McGlinchey	Offensive line	Senior	Notre Dame
Quenton Nelson*	Offensive line	Senior	Notre Dame
Cody O'Connell	Offensive line	Senior	Washington State
Billy Price*	Center	Senior	Ohio State
Bradley Chubb*	Defensive line	Senior	North Carolina State
Sutton Smith	Defensive line	Sophomore	Northern Illinois
Maurice Hurst Jr.	Defensive line	Senior	Michigan
Hercules Mata'afa	Defensive line	Junior	Washington State
Ed Oliver	Defensive tackle	Sophomore	Houston
Josey Jewell*	Linebacker	Senior	Iowa
Roquan Smith*	Linebacker	Junior	Georgia
Josh Jackson*	Defensive back	Junior	Iowa
Denzel Ward	Defensive back	Junior	Ohio State
DeShon Elliott*	Defensive back	Junior	Texas
Minkah Fitzpatrick*	Defensive back	Junior	Alabama
Michael Dickson*	Punter	Junior	Texas
Matt Gay	Kicker	Junior	Utah
Saquon Barkley	All-purpose	Junior	Penn State
Dante Pettis	All-purpose	Senior	Washington

== Offense ==
=== Quarterback ===
- Baker Mayfield, Oklahoma (AP, AFCA, FWAA, WCFF, TSN, SI, USAT, ESPN, CBS, CFN, Athlon)

=== Running back ===
- Saquon Barkley, Penn State (AFCA, WCFF)
- Bryce Love, Stanford (AP, AFCA, FWAA, WCFF, TSN, SI, USAT, ESPN, CBS, CFN, Athlon)
- Rashaad Penny, San Diego State (AP, FWAA, TSN, SI, USAT, ESPN, CBS, CFN, Athlon)

=== Wide receiver ===
- Michael Gallup, Colorado State (FWAA, WCFF, Athlon)
- David Sills V, West Virginia (TSN, SI, CBS)
- James Washington, Oklahoma State (AP, AFCA, FWAA, WCFF, TSN, SI, USAT, ESPN, CBS, CFN, Athlon)
- Anthony Miller, Memphis (AP, AFCA, USAT, ESPN, CFN, Athlon)

=== Tight end ===
- Mark Andrews, Oklahoma (AP, AFCA, FWAA, WCFF, TSN, SI, USAT, ESPN, CBS, CFN, Athlon)

=== Offensive line ===
- Beau Benzschawel, Wisconsin (SI, CFN)
- Orlando Brown Jr., Oklahoma (AP, AFCA, FWAA, WCFF, TSN, SI, USAT, ESPN, CBS, CFN, Athlon)
- David Edwards, Wisconsin (AFCA)
- Will Hernandez, UTEP (USAT)
- Mitch Hyatt, Clemson (TSN, ESPN)
- Mike McGlinchey, Notre Dame (AP, AFCA, FWAA, WCFF, SI, USAT, CBS, CFN, Athlon)
- Quenton Nelson, Notre Dame (AP, AFCA, FWAA, WCFF, TSN, SI, USAT, ESPN, CBS, CFN, Athlon)
- Cody O'Connell, Washington State (WCFF, TSN)
- Chukwuma Okorafor, Western Michigan (FWAA)
- Billy Price, Ohio State (AP, AFCA, FWAA, WCFF, TSN, SI, USAT, ESPN, CFN, Athlon)
- Frank Ragnow, Arkansas (CBS)
- Braden Smith, Auburn (AP, ESPN, CBS, Athlon)

== Defense ==
=== Defensive line ===
- Mat Boesen, TCU (SI)
- Nick Bosa, Ohio State (AFCA)
- Austin Bryant, Clemson (FWAA)
- Bradley Chubb, North Carolina State (AP, AFCA, FWAA, WCFF, TSN, SI, USAT, ESPN, CBS, CFN, Athlon)
- Clelin Ferrell, Clemson (AP, Athlon)
- Maurice Hurst Jr., Michigan (AP, TSN, USAT, ESPN, CBS, Athlon)
- Hercules Mata'afa, Washington State (AP, WCFF, TSN, SI, ESPN, CBS, CFN, Athlon)
- Ed Oliver, Houston (AFCA, FWAA, WCFF, USAT, ESPN, CBS)
- Sutton Smith, Northern Illinois (FWAA, WCFF, USAT, CFN)
- Christian Wilkins, Clemson (AFCA, TSN, CFN)

=== Linebacker ===
- T. J. Edwards, Wisconsin (AP, USAT, ESPN, Athlon)
- Rashaan Evans, Alabama, (AFCA)
- Jeff Holland, Auburn (SI)
- Josey Jewell, Iowa (AP, AFCA, FWAA, WCFF, TSN, SI, USAT, ESPN, CBS, CFN, Athlon)
- Micah Kiser, Virginia (TSN)
- Joel Lanning, Iowa State (FWAA)
- Dorian O'Daniel, Clemson (SI)
- Ogbonnia Okoronkwo, Oklahoma (WCFF, CBS)
- Roquan Smith, Georgia (AP, AFCA, FWAA, WCFF, TSN, SI, USAT, ESPN, CBS, CFN, Athlon)

=== Defensive back ===
- Quin Blanding, Virginia (CFN)
- Carlton Davis, Auburn (SI)
- Jalen Davis, Utah State (WCFF)
- DeShon Elliott, Texas (AP, AFCA, FWAA, WCFF, TSN, SI, ESPN, Athlon)
- Minkah Fitzpatrick, Alabama (AP, AFCA, FWAA, WCFF, TSN, SI, USAT, ESPN, CBS, CFN, Athlon)
- Josh Jackson, Iowa (AP, AFCA, FWAA, WCFF, TSN, SI, USAT, ESPN, CBS, CFN, Athlon)
- Derwin James, Florida State (FWAA, USAT, CBS)
- Julian Love, Notre Dame (CFN)
- Denzel Ward, Ohio State (AP, AFCA, TSN, USAT, ESPN, CBS, Athlon)

== Special teams ==
=== Kicker ===
- Daniel Carlson, Auburn (AFCA, WCFF, CBS)
- Matt Gay, Utah (AP, FWAA, TSN, SI, USAT, ESPN, CFN, Athlon)

=== Punter ===
- Michael Dickson, Texas (AP, AFCA, FWAA, WCFF, TSN, USAT, ESPN, CBS, Athlon)
- J. K. Scott, Alabama (CFN)
- Johnny Townsend, Florida (SI)

=== All-purpose / return specialist ===
- Saquon Barkley, Penn State (AP, FWAA, TSN, SI, ESPN, CBS, Athlon)
- Dante Pettis, Washington (AFCA, FWAA, WCFF, TSN, SI, USAT, CFN, Athlon)
- Tony Pollard, Memphis (FWAA, WCFF, CFN, Athlon)

== See also ==
- 2017 All-ACC football team
- 2017 All-SEC football team
- 2017 All-Big Ten Conference football team
- 2017 All-Big 12 Conference football team
- 2017 All-Pac-12 Conference football team
