= Billy Price (American football) =

American football player (born 1994)

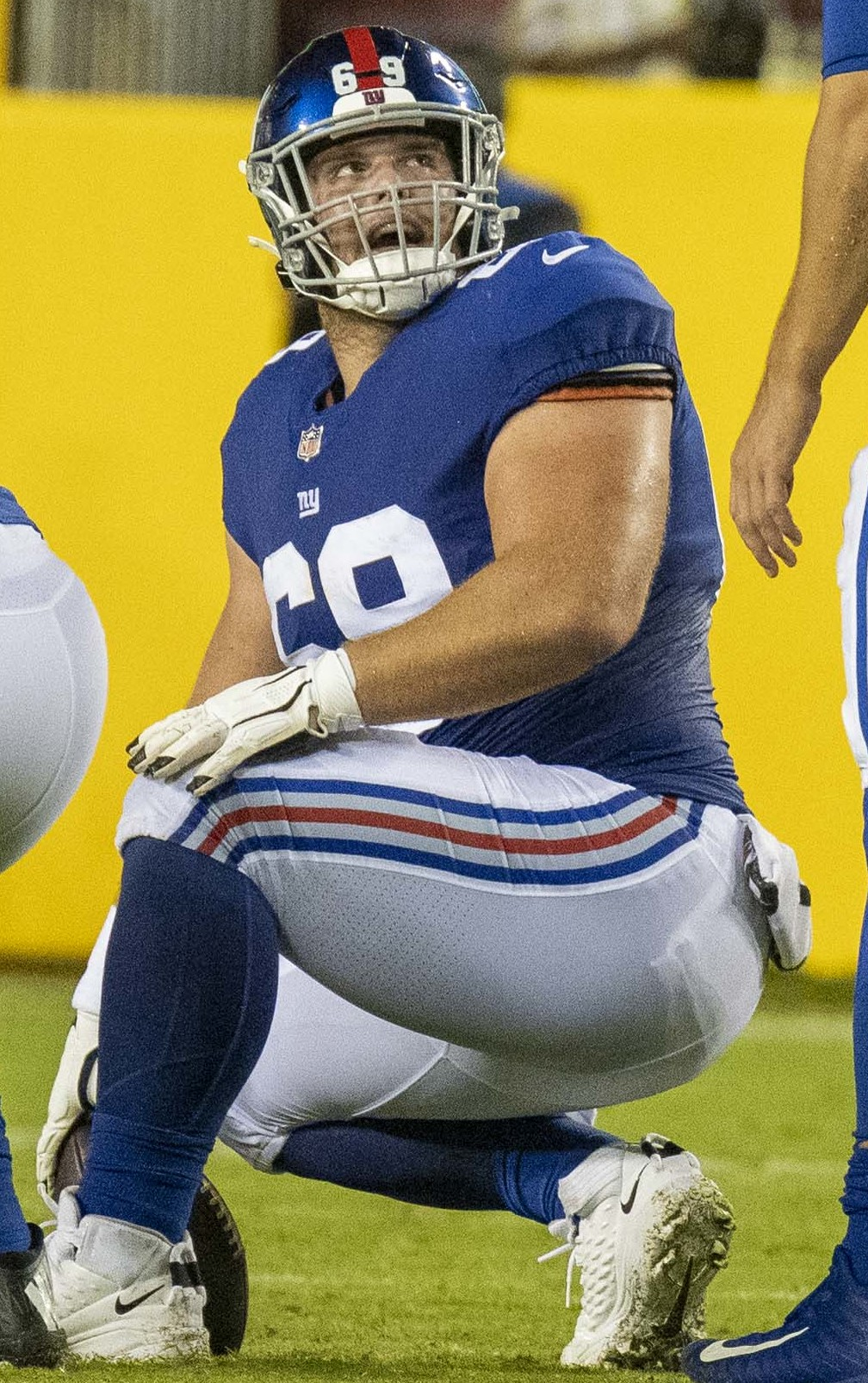
- Price with the New York Giants in 2021

No. 53, 69
- Position: Center

Personal information
- Born: October 11, 1994 (age 32); Austintown, Ohio, U.S.
- Listed height: 6 ft 4 in (1.93 m)
- Listed weight: 310 lb (141 kg)

Career information
- High school: Austintown Fitch
- College: Ohio State (2013–2017)
- NFL draft: 2018: 1st round, 21st overall pick

Career history
- Cincinnati Bengals (2018–2020); New York Giants (2021); Las Vegas Raiders (2022)*; Arizona Cardinals (2022); New Orleans Saints (2023)*; Dallas Cowboys (2023)*
- * Offseason or practice squad member only

Awards and highlights
- PFWA All-Rookie Team (2018); CFP national champion (2014); Rimington Trophy (2017); Jim Parker Trophy (2017); Unanimous All-American (2017); Second-team All-American (2016); Big Ten Offensive Lineman of the Year (2017); 2× First-team All-Big Ten (2016, 2017); Third-team All-Big Ten (2015)

Career NFL statistics
- Games played: 69
- Games started: 45
- Fumble recoveries: 1
- Stats at Pro Football Reference

William Price (born October 11, 1994) is an American former professional football player who was a center for six seasons in the National Football League (NFL) with the Cincinnati Bengals, New York Giants and Arizona Cardinals. He played college football for the Ohio State Buckeyes, earning unanimous All-American honors in 2017. He was selected by the Bengals in the first round of the 2018 NFL draft.

== Early life ==
Price attended Austintown Fitch High School in Austintown, Ohio, where he played defensive line. In 2012, as a senior, Price earned First-team All-State and Division I Co-Defensive Player of the Year in Ohio (AP). In his sophomore and senior seasons, Price helped his Fitch team earn playoff berths.

In high school, Price also competed in the discus and shotput on Fitch's track and field team.

== College career ==
A 4-star recruit, Price committed to Ohio State over offers from Michigan, Nebraska, Notre Dame, Tennessee, and UCLA, among others. In 2013, Price redshirted his freshman season before going on to start all 55 games from 2014 to 2017, breaking the previous OSU school records for starts and consecutive starts of 50.

As a redshirt freshman starting at guard, Price helped Ohio State to the national championship.

Price played his first three seasons at offensive guard before moving to center for his senior season.

As a senior with the Ohio State Buckeyes in 2017, Price won the Rimington Trophy as the best collegiate center, earned First-team All-Big Ten honors, and was also named a unanimous All-American.

In 2016 and 2017, Price was elected team captain.

== Professional career ==
Pre-draft measurables
Height	Weight	Arm length	Hand span
6 ft 3 3/4 in (1.92 m)	305 lb (138 kg)	32 in (0.81 m)	9 3/4 in (0.25 m)
All values from NFL Combine

=== Cincinnati Bengals ===
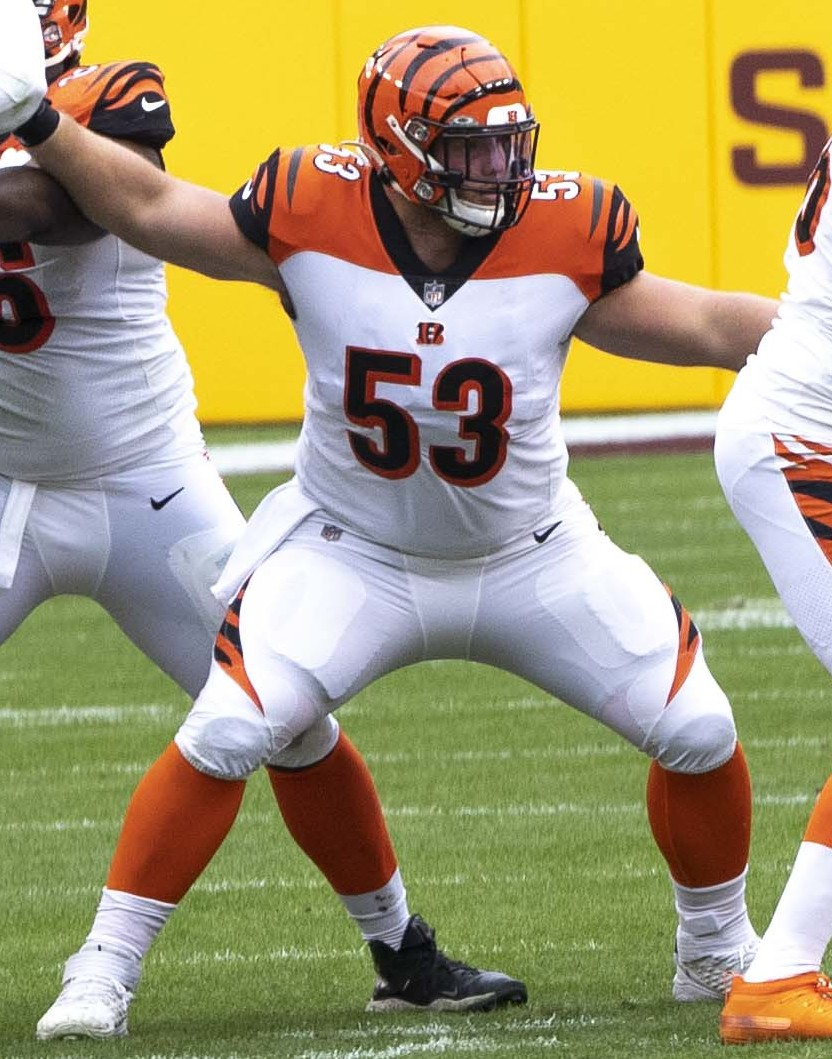
Price with the Cincinnati Bengals in 2020

Price was selected by the Cincinnati Bengals with the 21st overall pick in the first round of the 2018 NFL draft. The Bengals acquired the pick from the Buffalo Bills along with Cordy Glenn in an offseason trade. He started the first two games at center before missing the next six games with a foot injury. He returned in Week 10 and remained the starter the rest of the season. He was named to the PFWA All-Rookie Team.

On April 28, 2021, the Bengals declined the option on Price's contract, making him a free agent in 2022.

=== New York Giants ===
On August 30, 2021, Price was traded to the New York Giants in exchange for defensive tackle B. J. Hill. Price started in 15 games in 2021 allowing 24 quarterback pressures and two sacks. Those 24 pressures were the fourth most by a Giants offensive lineman.

=== Las Vegas Raiders ===
On September 14, 2022, Price signed with the Las Vegas Raiders to the practice squad.

=== Arizona Cardinals ===
On October 4, 2022, the Arizona Cardinals signed Price off the Raiders practice squad. Price was named the starting center for Week 7 after Rodney Hudson injured his knee.

=== New Orleans Saints ===
On June 15, 2023, Price signed with the New Orleans Saints. He was released by the team on July 20.

=== Dallas Cowboys ===
On September 27, 2023, Price was signed to the Dallas Cowboys practice squad. His contract expired when the team's season ended January 14, 2024.

=== Retirement ===
On May 25, 2024, Price announced his retirement, citing recovery from a non-sports-related pulmonary embolism he suffered about a month earlier.

== Personal life ==
At Ohio State, Price majored in Business Administration with a specialization in Operations Management. In college, Price earned Academic All-Big Ten Conference honors (2014 and 2017) and OSU Scholar-Athlete honors (2013 and 2014) twice each.
