= Jerome Baker (American football) =

American football player (born 1996)

Profile
- Position: Linebacker

Personal information
- Born: December 25, 1996 (age 29); Cleveland, Ohio, U.S.
- Listed height: 6 ft 2 in (1.88 m)
- Listed weight: 232 lb (105 kg)

Career information
- High school: Benedictine (Cleveland)
- College: Ohio State (2015–2017)
- NFL draft: 2018: 3rd round, 73rd overall pick

Career history
- Miami Dolphins (2018–2023); Seattle Seahawks (2024); Tennessee Titans (2024); Cleveland Browns (2025)

Career NFL statistics as of 2025
- Total tackles: 688
- Sacks: 26
- Forced fumbles: 9
- Fumble recoveries: 1
- Pass deflections: 25
- Interceptions: 5
- Defensive touchdowns: 2
- Stats at Pro Football Reference

Jerome Baker (born December 25, 1996) is an American professional football linebacker. He played college football for the Ohio State Buckeyes and was selected by the Miami Dolphins in the third round of the 2018 NFL draft.

== Early life ==
Baker attended Benedictine High School in Cleveland, Ohio. He was a member of the 2014 State Championship football team while at Benedictine and was considered the #2 recruit in the state of Ohio for the class of 2015. He originally committed to the University of Florida to play college football, but changed his commitment to Ohio State University.

== College career ==
Baker played at Ohio State from 2015 to 2017. After his junior season in 2017, he decided to forgo his senior year to enter the 2018 NFL draft. During his career, he had 159 tackles, seven sacks, and two interceptions. Baker played in 33 games with 25 starts in his career at Ohio State, and was named Honorable Mention All-Big 10 in 2016 and 2017, both seasons in which he was a full-time starter.

== Professional career ==
=== Pre-draft ===
On January 8, 2018, Baker released a statement on his Twitter account announcing his decision to forgo his remaining eligibility and enter the 2018 NFL draft. Baker attended the NFL Scouting Combine and completed the majority of combine drills, but opted to skip the short shuttle and three-cone drill. On March 22, he participated at Ohio State's pro day and performed the short shuttle, three-cone drill, and positional drills. Baker attended pre-draft visits with the Denver Broncos, San Francisco 49ers, and Jacksonville Jaguars. After the pre-draft process, Baker was projected to be a third or fourth-round pick by NFL draft experts and scouts. He was ranked the seventh-best linebacker in the draft by Sports Illustrated, was ranked the seventh-best outside linebacker by Scouts Inc., and was ranked the 12th best outside linebacker by DraftScout.com.

External videos
- Jerome Baker's NFL Combine Workout
- Jerome Baker's 40-yard dash

Pre-draft measurables
Height	Weight	Arm length	Hand span	Wingspan	40-yard dash	10-yard split	20-yard split	20-yard shuttle	Three-cone drill	Vertical jump	Broad jump	Bench press
6 ft 1 1/8 in (1.86 m)	229 lb (104 kg)	31 1/2 in (0.80 m)	10 3/8 in (0.26 m)	6 ft 4 1/8 in (1.93 m)	4.53 s	1.60 s	2.68 s	4.15 s	6.93 s	36 1/2 in (0.93 m)	10 ft 6 in (3.20 m)	22 reps
All values from NFL Combine/Ohio State's Pro Day

External videos
- Dolphins draft Jerome Baker 73rd overall

=== Miami Dolphins ===
==== 2018 ====
The Miami Dolphins selected Baker in the third round with the 73rd overall pick in the 2018 NFL draft. Baker was the tenth linebacker selected. He was reunited with former Ohio State teammate Raekwon McMillan.

On June 2, 2018, the Dolphins signed Baker to a four-year, $3.80 million contract that includes a signing bonus of $975,200. Throughout training camp, Baker competed to be the starting strongside linebacker after the role was left vacant by the departure of Lawrence Timmons. Baker competed against Mike Hull, Stephone Anthony, Chase Allen, and Quentin Poling. Head coach Adam Gase named Baker and Kiko Alonso the starting outside linebackers to begin the regular season. They started alongside middle linebacker Raekwon McMillan.

He made his professional regular-season debut and first career start in the Dolphins' season-opener against the Tennessee Titans, and made six combined tackles during their 27–20 victory. In Week 4, he collected a season-high ten combined tackles (six solos) as the Dolphins lost 38–7 at the New England Patriots. The following week, he recorded seven combined tackles and made two sacks during a 27–17 loss at the Cincinnati Bengals in Week 5. On November 4, Baker made five combined tackles, a pass deflection, and caught his first career interception during the Dolphins' 13–6 win against the New York Jets in Week 9. He finished his rookie season with 79 combined tackles (57 solos), three pass deflections, three sacks, one interception, and one touchdown in 16 games with 11 starts. Baker earned an overall grade of 70.3 from Pro Football Focus, which ranked as the 29th best among all qualified linebackers in 2018.

==== 2019 ====
In Week 2 against the Patriots, Baker recorded a team-high 12 tackles as the Dolphins lost 43–0. In Week 10 against the Indianapolis Colts, Baker recorded a team-high eight tackles and one sack on quarterback Brian Hoyer in the 16–12 win. In Week 15 against the New York Giants, Baker recorded a team-high 12 tackles and intercepted a pass thrown by Eli Manning during the 36–20 loss. He finished the 2019 season with 126 tackles, four passes defensed, two forced fumbles, 1.5 sacks, and one interception.

==== 2020 ====
Baker was placed on the reserve/COVID-19 list by the Dolphins on July 31, 2020, and activated from the list three days later.

In Week 1 against the Patriots, Baker recorded a team-high 16 tackles (12 solo), sacked quarterback Cam Newton once, and forced wide receiver N'Keal Harry to fumble the football in the endzone for a touchback during the 21–11 loss. In Week 14 against the Kansas City Chiefs, Baker led the team with 9 tackles and sacked Patrick Mahomes 2.5 times during the 33–27 loss. One of Baker's sacks on Mahomes resulted in a loss of 30 yards.

==== 2021 ====
Baker signed a three-year, $39 million contract extension with the Dolphins on June 13, 2021.

==== 2023 ====
On January 9, 2024, the Dolphins placed Baker on injured reserve. On March 5, Baker was released. Contract negotiations between Miami and Baker had been proposed at the NFL Combine, but they fell through.

=== Seattle Seahawks ===
On March 16, 2024, Baker signed with the Seattle Seahawks.

On July 18, 2024, Baker was placed on the Active/Physically Unable to Perform (PUP) list. On July 23, he was activated from the PUP list after passing his physical. He appeared in 5 games with the Seahawks, making 37 tackles, one sack, two pass deflections, and a fumble recovery.

=== Tennessee Titans ===
On October 23, 2024, Baker and a 2025 fourth-round draft pick was sent to the Tennessee Titans in a trade with the Seattle Seahawks for Ernest Jones. He appeared in 5 games with the Titans, making 24 tackles, one sack, and two pass deflections.

=== Cleveland Browns ===
On March 24, 2025, Baker signed a one-year contract with the Cleveland Browns. He finished the 2025 season with 1.5 sacks and 40 total tackles (11 solo).

== NFL career statistics ==
Legend
**Bold**	Career high

=== Regular season ===
Year	Team	Games		Tackles					Interceptions						Fumbles				
Year	Team	GP	GS	Cmb	Solo	Ast	Sck	TFL	Int	Yds	Avg	Lng	TD	PD	FF	Fum	FR	Yds	TD
2018	MIA	16	11	79	57	22	3.0	4	1	25	25.0	25	**1**	3	0	**1**	0	0	0
2019	MIA	16	15	**126**	**76**	**50**	1.5	3	1	**34**	**34.0**	**34**	0	**4**	**2**	0	0	0	0
2020	MIA	16	11	112	70	42	**7.0**	7	0	0	0.0	0	0	3	**2**	0	0	0	0
2021	MIA	16	16	92	62	30	5.5	**9**	1	0	0.0	0	0	**4**	1	0	0	0	0
2022	MIA	**17**	**17**	100	66	34	4.0	6	0	0	0.0	0	0	**4**	1	0	0	0	0
2023	MIA	13	12	78	51	27	1.5	2	**2**	24	12.0	23	**1**	3	0	0	0	0	0
2024	SEA	5	5	37	21	16	1.0	2	0	0	0.0	0	0	2	1	0	**1**	0	0
2024	TEN	5	3	24	13	11	1.0	0	0	0	0.0	0	0	2	0	0	0	0	0
2025	CLE	17	4	40	11	29	1.5	3	0	0	0.0	0	0	0	**2**	0	0	0	0
Career		121	94	688	427	261	26.0	36	5	83	16.6	34	2	25	9	1	1	0	0

=== Postseason ===
Year	Team	Games		Tackles					Interceptions						Fumbles				
Year	Team	GP	GS	Cmb	Solo	Ast	Sck	TFL	Int	Yds	Avg	Lng	TD	PD	FF	Fum	FR	Yds	TD
2022	MIA	1	1	7	4	3	1.0	1	0	0	0.0	0	0	0	0	0	0	0	0
Career		1	1	7	4	3	1.0	1	0	0	0.0	0	0	0	0	0	0	0	0
