= Raekwon McMillan =

American football player (born 1995)

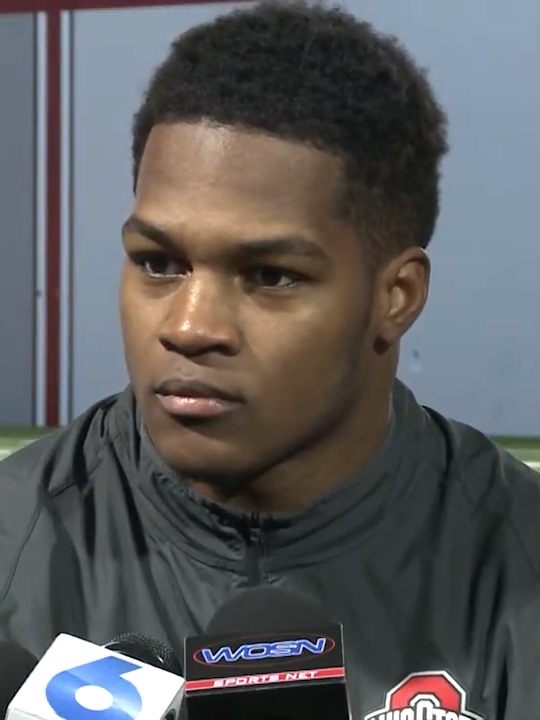
- McMillan in 2015

Profile
- Position: Linebacker

Personal information
- Born: November 17, 1995 (age 30); Midway, Georgia, U.S.
- Listed height: 6 ft 2 in (1.88 m)
- Listed weight: 250 lb (113 kg)

Career information
- High school: Liberty County (Hinesville, Georgia)
- College: Ohio State (2014–2016)
- NFL draft: 2017: 2nd round, 54th overall pick

Career history
- Miami Dolphins (2017–2019); Las Vegas Raiders (2020); New England Patriots (2021–2024); Tennessee Titans (2024)

Awards and highlights
- CFP national champion (2014); Second-team All-American (2015); 2× First-team All-Big Ten (2015, 2016)

Career NFL statistics
- Total tackles: 285
- Sacks: 1
- Forced fumbles: 3
- Fumble recoveries: 2
- Pass deflections: 4
- Defensive touchdowns: 1
- Stats at Pro Football Reference

Raekwon McMillan (born November 17, 1995) is an American former professional football linebacker. He played college football for the Ohio State Buckeyes and was selected by the Miami Dolphins in the second round of the 2017 NFL draft. He has also played for the Las Vegas Raiders, New England Patriots, and Tennessee Titans.

== Early life ==
McMillan was born in Midway, Georgia. He was named after rapper Raekwon of the Wu-Tang Clan. He attended Liberty County High School in Hinesville, Georgia. He won the High School Butkus Award in 2013. McMillan was a five-star recruit by Rivals.com and was the top-ranked inside linebacker in his class.

== College career ==
McMillan played college football at Ohio State. As a freshman in 2014, he appeared in 13 games making 54 tackles, 2.5 sacks, an interception returned for 24 yards, and a pass defended. As a sophomore in 2015, he played 13 games with 119 tackles, 1.5 sacks, four passes defended, and a fumble recovery. As a junior in 2016, he played 13 games with 102 tackles, two sacks, five passes defended, and two forced fumbles. After his junior year, McMillan declared his intentions to enter the 2017 NFL draft.

== Professional career ==
=== Pre-draft ===
McMillan received an invitation to the NFL Combine and completed all of the combine and positional drills. He also participated at Ohio State's highly anticipated pro day, but opted to only run positional drills. Seven general managers and nine head coaches attended Ohio State's pro day to scout McMillan and ten other prospects. McMillan had private workouts and visits with 11 teams that included the Cincinnati Bengals, New England Patriots, Miami Dolphins, Pittsburgh Steelers, Kansas City Chiefs, Washington Redskins, Baltimore Ravens, Detroit Lions, New York Jets, Oakland Raiders, and New Orleans Saints. The majority of NFL draft experts and analysts projected McMillan to be selected in the second or third round. He was ranked the second best inside linebacker in the draft by NFL analyst Bucky Brooks, the third best inside linebacker by NFLDraftScout.com, the fifth best linebacker by Sports Illustrated, and was ranked the tenth best linebacker in the draft by ESPN.

External videos
- Raekwon McMillan’s NFL Combine Workout
- Raekwon McMillan runs a 4.61 40-yard dash

Pre-draft measurables
Height	Weight	Arm length	Hand span	40-yard dash	10-yard split	20-yard split	20-yard shuttle	Three-cone drill	Vertical jump	Broad jump	Bench press
6 ft 1 7/8 in (1.88 m)	240 lb (109 kg)	33 in (0.84 m)	9 3/4 in (0.25 m)	4.61 s	1.61 s	2.69 s	4.39 s	7.15 s	33 in (0.84 m)	10 ft 1 in (3.07 m)	23 reps
All values from NFL Combine

=== Miami Dolphins ===
==== 2017 ====
The Dolphins selected McMillan in the second round (54th overall) of the 2017 NFL draft. He was the seventh linebacker selected in 2017. On May 5, 2017, the Dolphins signed McMillan to a four-year, $4.69 million contract with $3.16 million guaranteed and a signing bonus of $1.55 million.

External videos
- Dolphins draft Raekwon McMillan 54th overall

McMillan entered training camp slated as the starting strongside linebacker after Koa Misi retired due to a neck injury. He impressed coaching staff and learned all three linebacker positions. McMillan remained the apparent front-runner throughout camp, but saw minor competition from Mike Hull and Neville Hewitt.

On August 10, 2017, McMillan made his professional debut in the Miami Dolphins’ first preseason game against the Atlanta Falcons, but left the game after suffering an apparent knee injury. The following day, it was confirmed that he had a torn an ACL and had abruptly ended his rookie season. On September 2, 2017, the Miami Dolphins officially placed McMillan on injured reserve.

==== 2018 ====
McMillan entered training camp slated as the de facto starting middle linebacker. Head coach Adam Gase named McMillan the starting middle linebacker to begin the regular season, along with outside linebackers Kiko Alonso and rookie Jerome Baker. He made his professional regular season debut and first career start in the Dolphins’ season-opener against the Tennessee Titans and recorded six combined tackles during their 27–20 victory. On December 23, 2018, McMillan collected a season-high ten combined tackles (six solo) during the Dolphins’ 17–7 loss against the Jacksonville Jaguars in Week 16. He started in all 16 games in 2018 and recorded 105 combined tackles (69 solo), two forced fumbles, and one pass deflection.

==== 2019 ====
McMillan entered the 2019 season as the Dolphins starting middle linebacker. He played in 13 games before suffering a hamstring injury in Week 15. He was placed on injured reserve on December 17, 2019.

=== Las Vegas Raiders ===
On August 29, 2020, McMillan was traded to the Las Vegas Raiders, along with a 2021 fifth-round draft pick, for a 2021 fourth-round draft pick, which they eventually re-acquired in a trade for Lynn Bowden He played 16 games during the 2020 season, primarily on special teams, making 27 total tackles.

=== New England Patriots ===
On March 19, 2021, McMillan signed with the Patriots. He suffered a torn ACL in practice and was placed on injured reserve on August 7, 2021, missing the 2021 season.

He signed a one-year contract extension through 2022 on September 27, 2021. McMillan entered the 2022 season as a starting linebacker alongside Ja'Whaun Bentley, but was relegated to special teams and a backup player as the season progressed. He finished the season with 35 tackles, one sack, and a fumble recovery touchdown.

On March 10, 2023, McMillan signed a contract extension with the Patriots. On May 25, it was announced that McMillan had suffered a partially torn Achilles tendon at organized team activities and would be placed on season-ending injured reserve, missing the entirety of his 2023 season once again.

Despite the injury, McMillan signed a one–year, $2.25 million contract extension with the Patriots on August 14, 2023. He played nine games for the Patriots during the 2024 season, making 45 total tackles. He was waived on November 8, 2024.

=== Tennessee Titans ===
On December 24, 2024, McMillan was signed to the Tennessee Titans practice squad, and promoted to the active roster four days later. He contributed to the final two games of the Titans' 2024 season, recording one tackle.
