= Binjimen Victor =

American gridiron football player (born 1997)

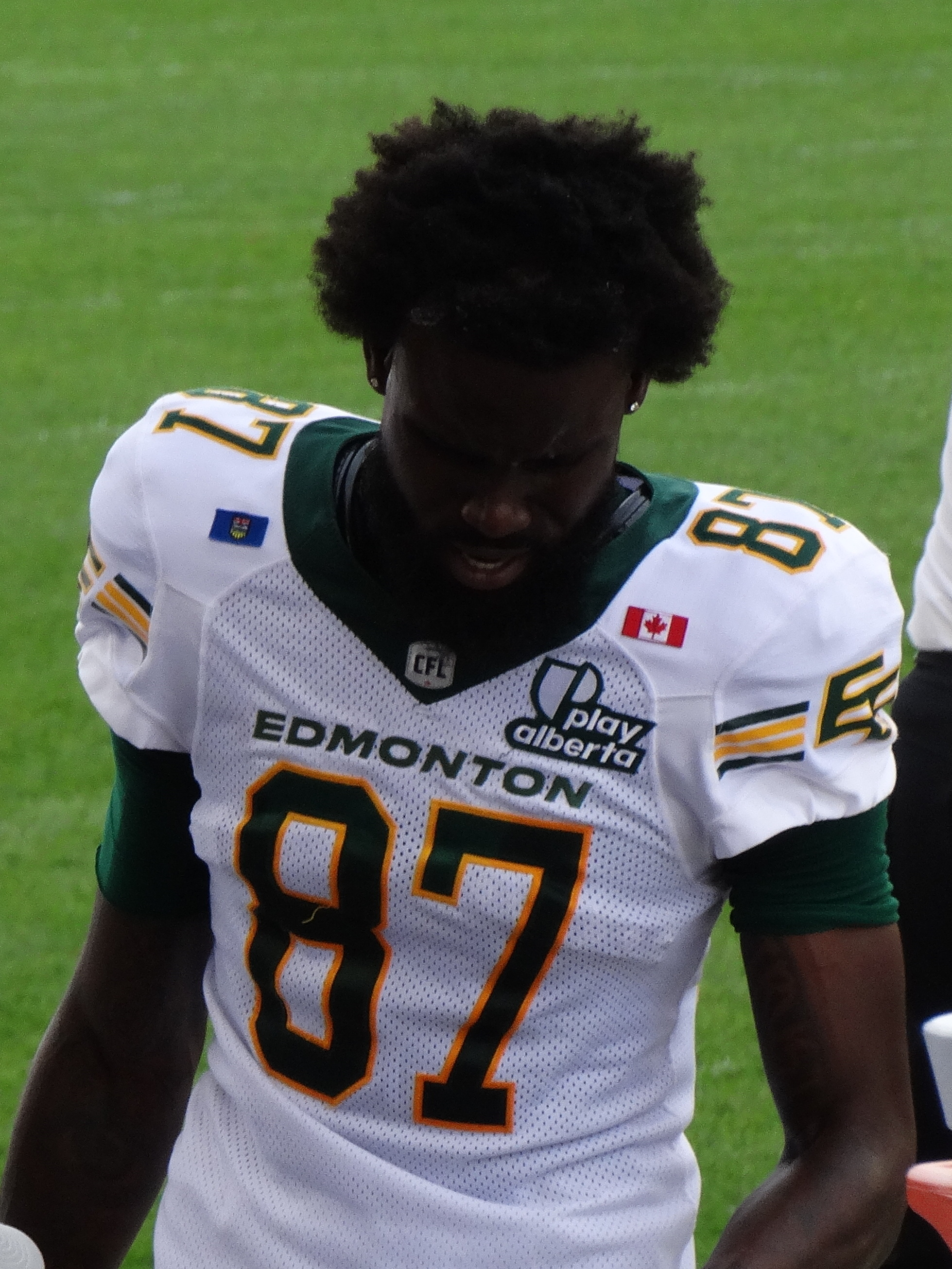
- Victor with the Edmonton Elks in 2025

Profile
- Position: Wide receiver

Personal information
- Born: January 15, 1997 (age 29); Pompano Beach, Florida, U.S.
- Listed height: 6 ft 4 in (1.93 m)
- Listed weight: 200 lb (91 kg)

Career information
- High school: Coconut Creek (Coconut Creek, Florida)
- College: Ohio State
- NFL draft: 2020: undrafted

Career history
- New York Giants (2020)*; Baltimore Ravens (2021–2022); Birmingham Stallions (2024); Edmonton Elks (2025); Ottawa Redblacks (2026)
- * Offseason or practice squad member only

Awards and highlights
- UFL champion (2024)
- Stats at Pro Football Reference
- Stats at CFL.ca

Binjimen Victor (born January 15, 1997) is an American professional football wide receiver. He played college football at Ohio State.

== Early life ==
Victor grew up in Pompano Beach, Florida, and attended Coconut Creek High School. As a senior, Victor caught 42 passes for 846 yards and 15 touchdowns and played in the 2016 All-American Bowl. Victor was rated a four-star recruit and committed to play college football at Ohio State over offers from Tennessee and West Virginia.

== College career ==
Victor was a member of the Ohio State Buckeyes for four seasons. As a true freshman, he played in five games with four reception for 64 yards and one touchdown. He caught 23 passes for 349 yards and was second on the team with seven touchdown receptions in his sophomore season. Victor caught 21 passes for 354 yards and four touchdowns as a junior. He scored a touchdown on a three yard reception with 40 seconds left to force overtime in a 52–51 win over Maryland. As a senior, he had 35 receptions for 573 yards and six touchdowns. Victor finished his collegiate career with 83 receptions for 1,340 yards and 18 touchdowns, tied for the tenth-most in Buckeyes history.

== Professional career ==
Pre-draft measurables
Height	Weight	Arm length	Hand span	Wingspan	40-yard dash	10-yard split	20-yard split	Three-cone drill	Vertical jump	Broad jump	Bench press
6 ft 3 3/4 in (1.92 m)	198 lb (90 kg)	34 1/8 in (0.87 m)	9 5/8 in (0.24 m)	6 ft 9 1/2 in (2.07 m)	4.60 s	1.51 s	2.67 s	7.10 s	35.0 in (0.89 m)	10 ft 8 in (3.25 m)	9 reps
All values from NFL Combine

=== New York Giants ===
Victor signed with the New York Giants as an undrafted free agent on April 25, 2020, shortly after the conclusion of the 2020 NFL draft. He was waived on September 5, and was re-signed to the team's practice squad the following day. Victor's practice squad contract with the team expired after the season on January 11, 2021.

=== Baltimore Ravens ===
On January 15, 2021, Victor signed a reserve/futures contract with the Baltimore Ravens. He was waived by Baltimore on August 31, and was re-signed to the team's practice squad the next day.

Victor signed a reserve/future contract with the Ravens on January 10, 2022. On August 30, Victor was waived by the Ravens; he was subsequently re-signed to the practice squad the following day. On December 3, Victor was signed to Baltimore's active roster after Tylan Wallace was placed on injured reserve. Two days later, he was waived by the Ravens. Victor was re–signed to the Ravens' practice squad on December 7. On January 14, 2023, Victor was promoted to Baltimore's active roster for their playoff game against the Cincinnati Bengals.

=== Birmingham Stallions ===
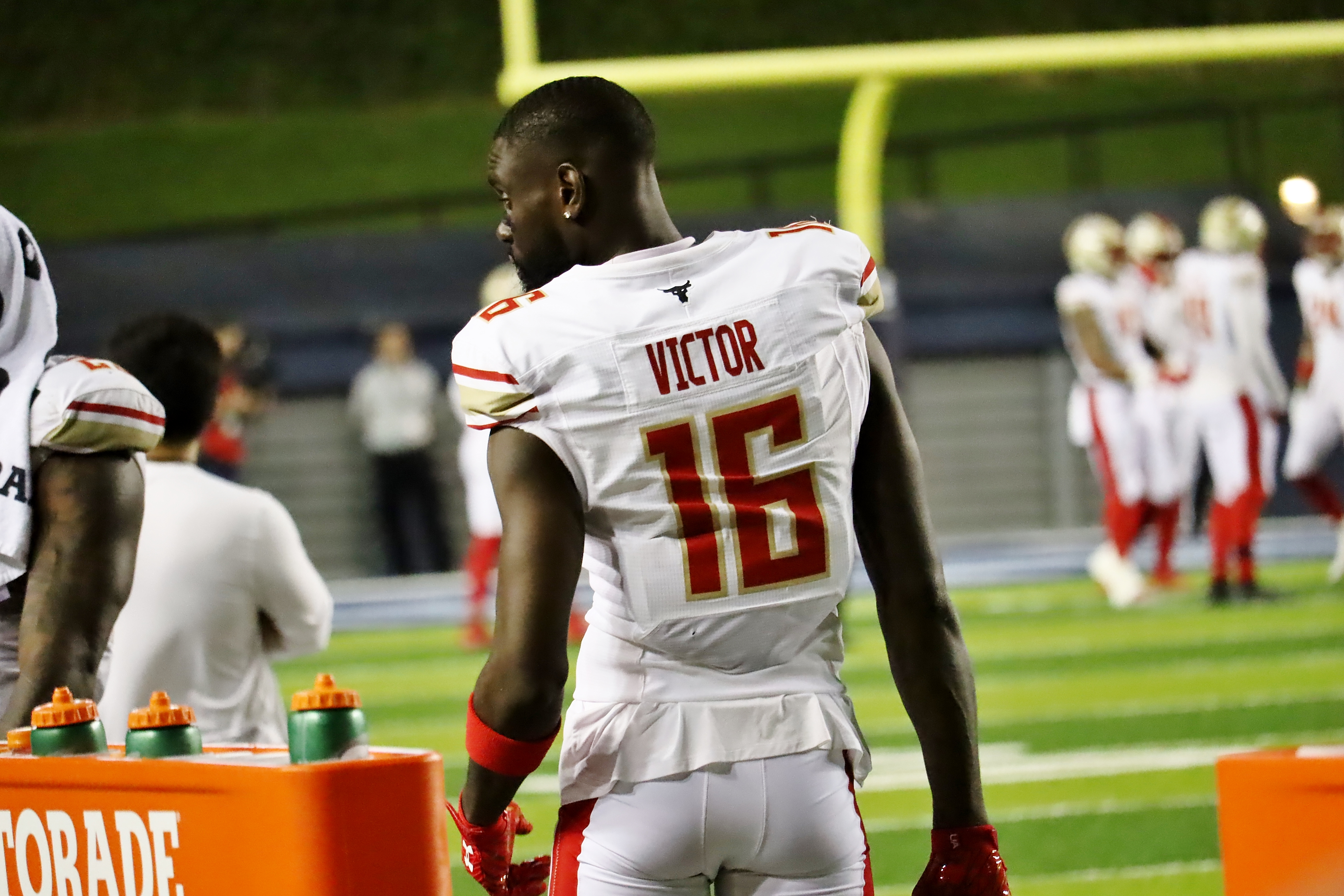
Victor with the Birmingham Stallions in 2024

On December 26, 2023, Victor signed with the Birmingham Stallions of the United States Football League (USFL). He re-signed with the team on August 15, 2024. Victor was released by the Stallions on February 5, 2025.

=== Edmonton Elks ===
Victor signed with the Edmonton Elks of the Canadian Football League on March 21, 2025.

On May 31, 2026, Victor was released by the Elks as part of final roster cuts.

=== Ottawa Redblacks ===
On June 1, 2026, Victor signed with the Ottawa Redblacks. On October 15, he was released.
