= Jalyn Holmes =

American football player (born 1996)

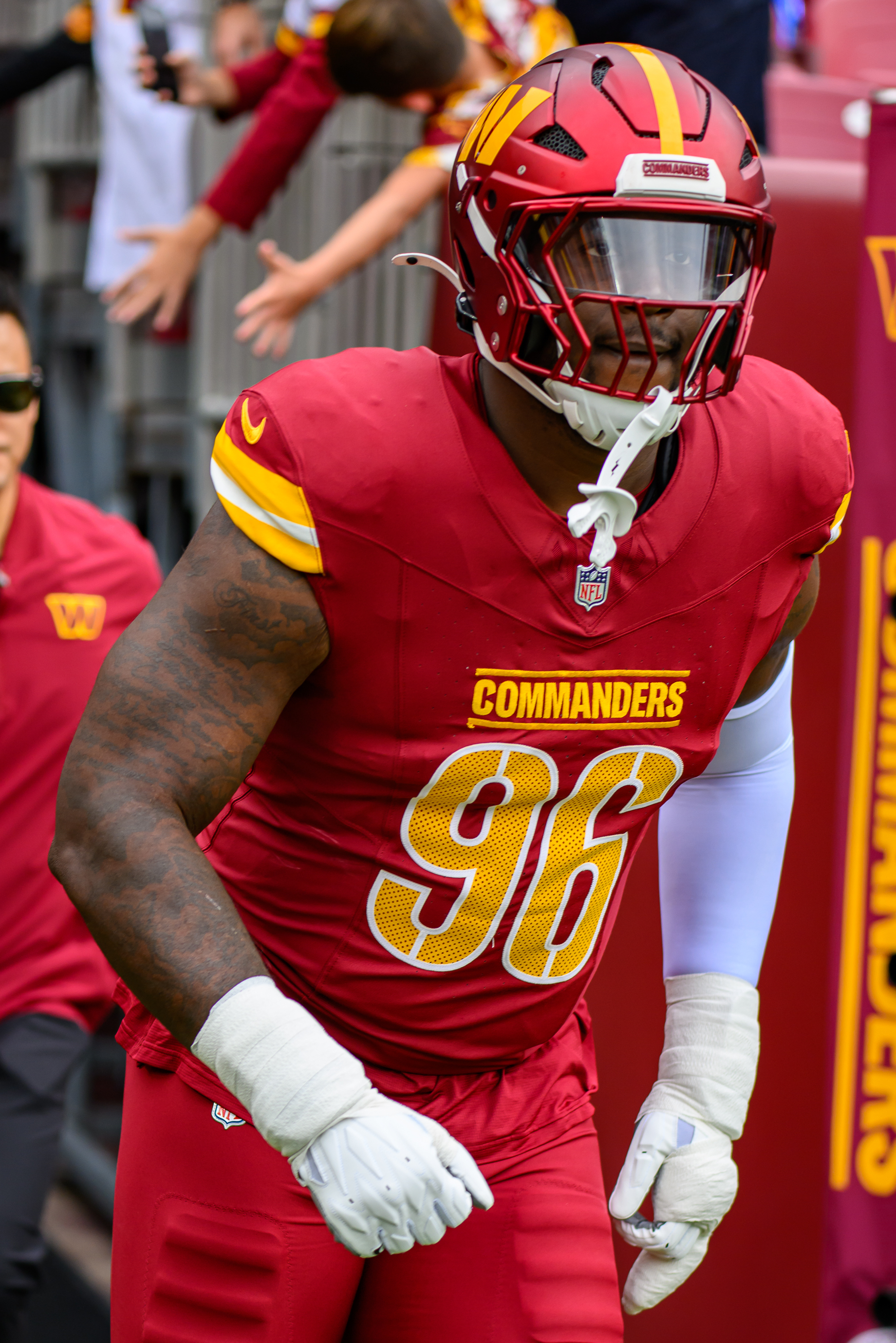
- Holmes with the Washington Commanders in 2025

No. 97 – Tennessee Titans
- Position: Defensive end
- Roster status: Practice squad

Personal information
- Born: January 25, 1996 (age 30); Norfolk, Virginia, U.S.
- Listed height: 6 ft 5 in (1.96 m)
- Listed weight: 283 lb (128 kg)

Career information
- High school: Lake Taylor (Norfolk)
- College: Ohio State (2014–2017)
- NFL draft: 2018: 4th round, 102nd overall pick

Career history
- Minnesota Vikings (2018–2020); New Orleans Saints (2021); New York Giants (2022)*; Chicago Bears (2022); New York Jets (2023–2024); Washington Commanders (2024–2025); Tennessee Titans (2026–present)*
- * Offseason or practice squad member only

Awards and highlights
- CFP national champion (2015)

Career NFL statistics as of 2025
- Tackles: 104
- Sacks: 4
- Pass deflections: 3
- Stats at Pro Football Reference

Jalyn Holmes (born January 25, 1996) is an American professional football defensive end for the Tennessee Titans of the National Football League (NFL). He played college football for the Ohio State Buckeyes and was selected by the Minnesota Vikings in the fourth round of the 2018 NFL draft. Holmes has also played for several other NFL teams.

== College career ==
Holmes played defensive end for the Ohio State Buckeyes from 2014 to 2017. Redshirting his freshman year, Holmes played in every Ohio State game from 2015 to 2017, appearing in 40 total contests. He was a two-time Honorable Mention all-Big Ten Conference honoree, racking up 85 career tackles, 15 tackles-for-loss, and 5 sacks. During his time with the Buckeyes, he participated in two Big Ten Championships, including the 2015 College Football Playoff National Championship, and five bowl games, helping the Buckeyes go 4–1 in that stretch.

== Professional career ==
Pre-draft measurables
Height	Weight	Arm length	Hand span	Wingspan	40-yard dash	10-yard split	20-yard split	20-yard shuttle	Three-cone drill	Vertical jump	Broad jump	Bench press
6 ft 4 7/8 in (1.95 m)	283 lb (128 kg)	34 in (0.86 m)	10 in (0.25 m)	6 ft 9 7/8 in (2.08 m)	4.82 s	1.67 s	2.79 s	4.59 s	7.62 s	32.0 in (0.81 m)	9 ft 4 in (2.84 m)	25 reps
All values from NFL Combine/Pro Day

=== Minnesota Vikings ===
Holmes was drafted by the Minnesota Vikings in the fourth round (102nd overall) of the 2018 NFL draft. On May 5, 2018, Holmes signed a four-year, $3.191 million contract with the Vikings, including a signing bonus of $731,396. In Week 7 of his rookie season, he recorded his first career sack, coming against Sam Darnold in a 37–17 win over the Jets in New York.

On September 1, 2021, Holmes was waived by the Vikings.

=== New Orleans Saints ===
On September 6, 2021, Holmes was signed to the practice squad of the New Orleans Saints. He was promoted to the active roster on October 6.

=== New York Giants ===
On May 18, 2022, Holmes signed with the New York Giants. He was waived by New York on August 30.

=== Chicago Bears ===
On October 4, 2022, Holmes was signed to the Chicago Bears practice squad. On January 4, 2023, the Bears signed him to the active roster. He was released by the Bears on August 4.

=== New York Jets ===
On August 14, 2023, Holmes signed with the New York Jets. He was waived on August 29, and re-signed to the practice squad. He was released on October 11. Holmes was then re-signed to the Jets practice squad on October 31. He was promoted to the active roster on December 19. On August 27, 2024, Holmes was released by the Jets and re-signed to the practice squad. He was promoted to the active roster on September 19. He was released on October 14.

=== Washington Commanders ===
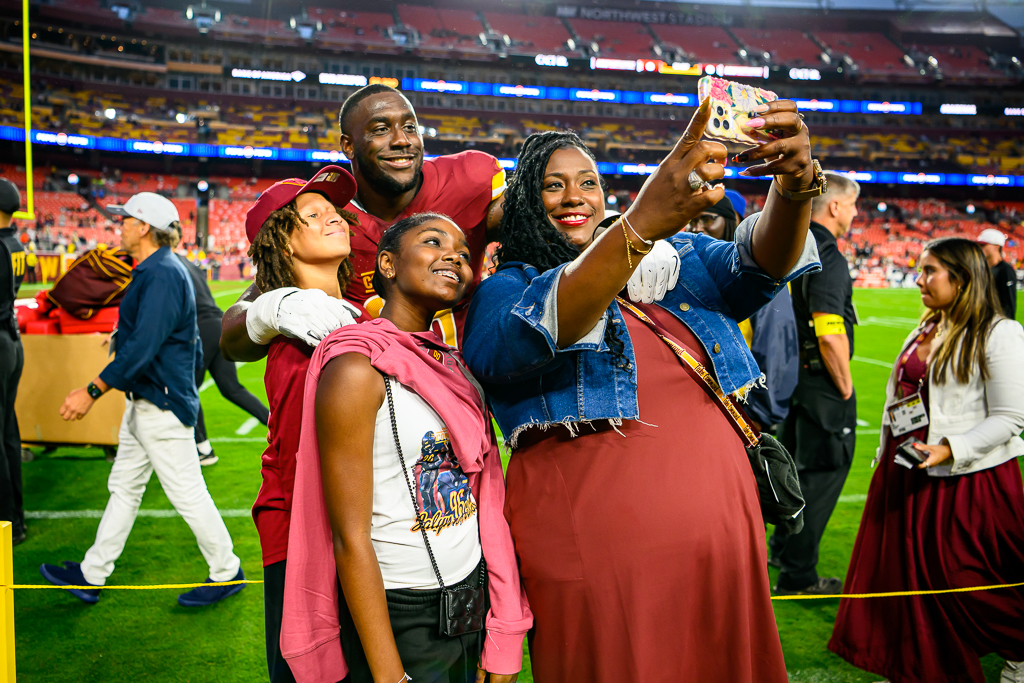
Holmes with the Washington Commanders in 2025

Holmes signed with the Washington Commanders on October 16, 2024. He recorded his first sack with the team in Week 8 against the Chicago Bears.

On March 19, 2025, Holmes re-signed with the Commanders. He was waived on August 26, and re-signed with their practice squad the following day. Holmes was promoted to the active roster after Deatrich Wise Jr. was placed on injured reserve on September 15. He was released on October 18, but re-signed three days later.

=== Tennessee Titans ===
On June 16, 2026, Holmes signed with the Tennessee Titans. He was waived by the Titans as a part of final roster cuts on August 30, but re–signed with the team's practice squad the next day.
