= Kendall Sheffield =

American football player (born 1996)

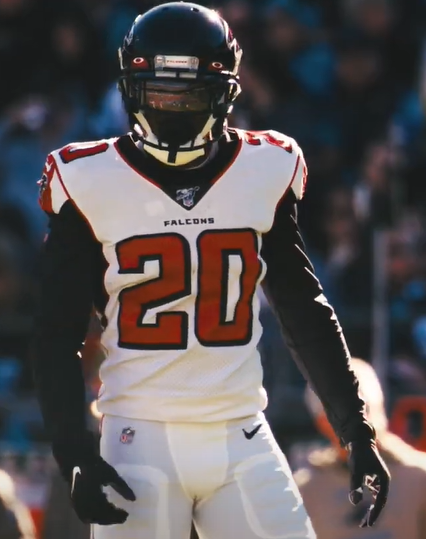
- Sheffield with the Atlanta Falcons in 2019

Profile
- Position: Cornerback

Personal information
- Born: May 30, 1996 (age 30); Missouri City, Texas, U.S.
- Listed height: 5 ft 11 in (1.80 m)
- Listed weight: 200 lb (91 kg)

Career information
- High school: Thurgood Marshall (Missouri City)
- College: Alabama (2015); Blinn (2016); Ohio State (2017–2018)
- NFL draft: 2019: 4th round, 111th overall pick

Career history
- Atlanta Falcons (2019–2021); Houston Texans (2022); Dallas Cowboys (2022)*; Houston Texans (2023)*; San Francisco 49ers (2023); Tennessee Titans (2023); New York Jets (2024); Miami Dolphins (2025)*
- * Offseason or practice squad member only

Career NFL statistics as of 2025
- Total tackles: 115
- Pass deflections: 6
- Forced fumbles: 2
- Stats at Pro Football Reference

Kendall Sheffield (born May 30, 1996) is an American professional football cornerback. He played college football for the Ohio State Buckeyes, and was selected by the Atlanta Falcons in the fourth round in the 2019 NFL draft.

== Early life ==
Sheffield attended Thurgood Marshall High School in Missouri City, Texas, where he played football and was a high-caliber track athlete. A first-team all-state pick, Sheffield had 39 tackles, three blocked field goals, seven pass break-ups, two interception, three fumble recoveries, two forced fumbles and one touchdown during his senior season for the Buffs.

Also a track athlete, Sheffield finished second in the 110 metres hurdle at the 2013 University Interscholastic League Class 4A state championship, behind only Beaumont Ozen's Tony Brown. In 2014, he won the 110-meter high hurdles and the 300-meter intermediate hurdles at the Class 4A state meet, and was named the Gatorade Texas Boys Track & Field Athlete of the Year.

Considered a five-star recruit by ESPN.com, Sheffield was listed as the No. 3 cornerback in the nation in 2015, behind only Iman Marshall and Kevin Toliver. Sheffield committed to Alabama at the 2015 Under Armour All-America Game. Sheffield arrived at Alabama as a five-star recruit but transferred after his freshman season.

== College career ==
Sheffield redshirted his initial year at Alabama. He decided to transfer to Blinn College, where he spent the 2016 season. In January 2017, Sheffield committed to Ohio State.

== Professional career ==
Pre-draft measurables
Height	Weight	Arm length	Hand span	20-yard shuttle	Three-cone drill	Vertical jump	Broad jump
5 ft 11 3/8 in (1.81 m)	193 lb (88 kg)	31 1/2 in (0.80 m)	9 1/4 in (0.23 m)	4.06 s	6.69 s	39.0 in (0.99 m)	10 ft 8 in (3.25 m)
All values from NFL Combine/Pro Day

=== Atlanta Falcons ===
Sheffield was selected by the Atlanta Falcons with the 111th overall pick in the fourth round of the 2019 NFL draft. In Week 2 against the Philadelphia Eagles, Sheffield recorded his first professional tackle and forced a fumble in the 24–20 win.

On September 8, 2021, Sheffield was placed on injured reserve to start the season. He was activated on October 9.

On May 13, 2022, Sheffield was released by the Falcons.

=== Houston Texans (first stint) ===
On May 17, 2022, Sheffield was claimed off waivers by the Houston Texans. On August 30, he was waived/injured and placed on injured reserve. He was released on October 11.

=== Dallas Cowboys ===
On October 25, 2022, the Dallas Cowboys signed Sheffield to their practice squad. His practice squad contract with the team expired after the season on January 22, 2023.

=== Houston Texans (second stint) ===
On March 3, 2023, the Texans signed Sheffield. On July 30, he was activated from the physically unable to perform list, and released from the Texans on August 13.

=== San Francisco 49ers ===
On September 27, 2023, Sheffield was signed to the San Francisco 49ers practice squad. He was released by the 49ers on October 31.

=== Tennessee Titans ===
On December 26, 2023, Sheffield was signed to the Tennessee Titans practice squad. His contract expired when the team's season ended January 7, 2024.

=== New York Jets ===
On July 27, 2024, Sheffield signed with the New York Jets. On August 27, he was released by the Jets as part of final roster cuts and re-signed to the practice squad the following day. He was promoted to the active roster on December 14.

=== Miami Dolphins ===
On May 12, 2025, Sheffield signed with the Miami Dolphins. He was released on August 26 as part of final roster cuts. On October 8, Sheffield re-signed with the team's practice squad.

=== Statistics ===
Year	Team	Games		Tackles				Interceptions				Fumbles	
Year	Team	G	GS	Comb	Solo	Ast	Sack	Int	Yds	TDs	PD	FF	FR
2019	ATL	16	11	46	33	13	0.0	0	0	0	3	1	0
2020	ATL	13	9	51	37	14	0.0	0	0	0	3	1	0
2021	ATL	9	0	4	2	2	0.0	0	0	0	0	0	0
2023	SF	3	0	4	4	0	0.0	0	0	0	0	0	0
2023	TEN	2	0	0	0	0	0.0	0	0	0	0	0	0
2024	NYJ	6	0	9	5	4	0.0	0	0	0	0	0	0
2025	MIA	2	0	1	1	0	0.0	0	0	0	0	0	0
Total		51	20	115	82	33	0.0	0	0	0	6	2	0
