= Chris Worley =

American football player (born 1995)

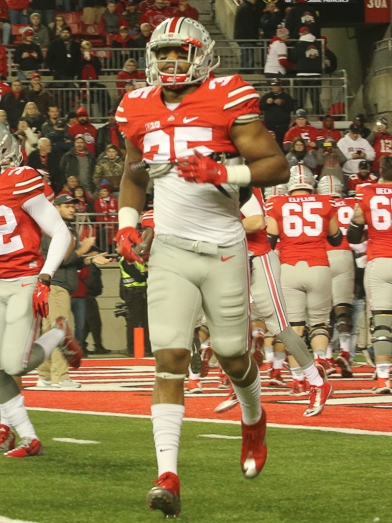
- Worley with Ohio State in 2015

No. 47, 48, 52
- Position: Linebacker

Personal information
- Born: September 15, 1995 (age 31); Cleveland, Ohio, U.S.
- Listed height: 6 ft 1 in (1.85 m)
- Listed weight: 242 lb (110 kg)

Career information
- High school: Glenville (Cleveland)
- College: Ohio State (2013–2017)
- NFL draft: 2018: undrafted

Career history
- Cincinnati Bengals (2018); Seattle Seahawks (2019)*; Philadelphia Eagles (2019)*
- * Offseason or practice squad member only

Awards and highlights
- CFP national champion (2014)

Career NFL statistics
- Total tackles: 2
- Stats at Pro Football Reference

Chris Worley (born September 15, 1995) is an American former professional football player who was a linebacker in the National Football League (NFL). He played college football for the Ohio State Buckeyes.

== Early life ==
Worley was born and raised in Cleveland, Ohio and attended Glenville High School. He played safety for the Tarblooders under coach Ted Ginn Sr. and registered 161 total tackles, 13 sacks, eight interceptions and seven forced fumbles over four years. As a senior, Worley was named first-team All-State after recording 89 tackles with nine sacks, five interceptions returned for touchdowns and five forced fumbles. Ranked the 20th overall prospect in Ohio by 247Sports.com and 25th overall by ESPN, Worley committed to Ohio State over offers from Arkansas, Georgia Tech, West Virginia, Pittsburgh, Michigan State, Illinois and Cincinnati.

== College career ==
Worley played four seasons for the Buckeyes, appearing in 50 games and starting 24 at three different linebacker positions. As a freshman, Worley played in 14 games (one start) as the Buckeyes went on to win the 2015 College Football Playoff National Championship. As a junior, he recorded 70 tackles, with 4.5 tackles for loss, a forced fumble and an interception and was named honorable mention All-Big Ten. Worley missed three games of his senior season due to a foot injury but still accumulated 56 tackles. Over the course of his collegiate career, Worley made 154 tackles (11 for loss), two sacks, and six pass breakups.

== Professional career ==
=== Cincinnati Bengals ===
Worley signed with the Cincinnati Bengals as an undrafted free agent on April 28, 2018. Worley was among the final cuts at the end of training camp and was subsequently re-signed by the Bengals to their practice squad on September 3, 2018. Worley was promoted to the Bengals' active roster on December 18, 2018 for the final two games of the season. Worley made his NFL debut on December 23, 2018 in a 26–18 loss to the Cleveland Browns. Worley appeared in two games with two tackles in his rookie season.

On July 30, 2019, Worley was waived by the Bengals.

=== Seattle Seahawks ===
On August 6, 2019, Worley was signed by the Seattle Seahawks, but was waived four days later.

=== Philadelphia Eagles ===
On August 19, 2019, Worley signed with the Philadelphia Eagles. He was waived during final roster cuts on August 30, 2019.
