= 2017 Big Ten Conference football season =

- League: NCAA Division I Football Bowl Subdivision
- Sport: Football
- Duration: August 31, 2017 through January 2018
- Teams: 14
- TV partner(s): ABC, ESPN2, ESPN Inc., Big Ten Network, FOX, FS1

2018 NFL Draft
- Top draft pick: Saquon Barkley (Penn State)
- Picked by: New York Giants, 2nd overall

Regular season
- Season MVP: Saquon Barkley, PSU
- East Division champions: Ohio State
- West Division champions: Wisconsin

Championship Game
- Champions: Ohio State
- Runners-up: Wisconsin
- Finals MVP: J.K. Dobbins, Ohio State (RB)

Football seasons
- 2016 2018

2017 Big Ten Conference football standings
	Conf.			Overall
Team	W		L	W		L
East Division
No. 5 Ohio State xy$	8	–	1	12	–	2
No. 15 Michigan State	7	–	2	10	–	3
No. 8 Penn State	7	–	2	11	–	2
Michigan	5	–	4	8	–	5
Rutgers	3	–	6	4	–	8
Indiana	2	–	7	5	–	7
Maryland	2	–	7	4	–	8
West Division
No. 7 Wisconsin xy	9	–	0	13	–	1
No. 17 Northwestern	7	–	2	10	–	3
Iowa	4	–	5	8	–	5
Purdue	4	–	5	7	–	6
Nebraska	3	–	6	4	–	8
Minnesota	2	–	7	5	–	7
Illinois	0	–	9	2	–	10
Championship: Ohio State 27, Wisconsin 21
$ – Conference champion; x – Division champion/co-champions; y – Championship game participant; Rankings from AP Poll

The 2017 Big Ten conference football season is the 122nd season of college football play for the Big Ten Conference and is part of the 2017 NCAA Division I FBS football season.

This was the Big Ten's fourth season with 14 teams. The defending league champion was the 2016 Penn State Nittany Lions football team. The 2017 season consisted of a nine–game conference schedule for the second year in a row.

Nebraska football coach Mike Riley was relieved from his position following the conclusion of Nebraska's 2017 season.

Ohio State defeated Wisconsin, 27–21, in the 2017 Big Ten Football Championship Game. No Big Ten teams were selected for the 2017 College Football Playoff.

== Rankings ==
		Pre	Wk 2	Wk 3	Wk 4	Wk 5	Wk 6	Wk 7	Wk 8	Wk 9	Wk 10	Wk 11	Wk 12	Wk 13	Wk 14	Wk 15	Final
Illinois	AP																
Illinois	C																
Illinois	CFP	Not released															
Indiana	AP																
Indiana	C																
Indiana	CFP	Not released															
Iowa	AP		RV	RV	RV	RV			RV			25	RV				RV
Iowa	C	RV	RV	RV	RV	RV		RV			RV	RV	RV				RV
Iowa	CFP	Not released										20					
Maryland	AP		RV	RV	RV		RV										
Maryland	C	RV	RV	RV	RV	RV	RV										
Maryland	CFP	Not released															
Michigan	AP	11	8	7	8	8	7	17	19	RV	RV	21	19	RV	RV	RV	
Michigan	C	9	8	7	8	7	7	16	15	25	24	22	18	RV		RV	
Michigan	CFP	Not released											24				
Michigan State	AP	RV	RV	RV	RV			21	18	16	24	13	22	21	19	18	15
Michigan State	C	RV		RV	RV		RV	22	19	18		16	24	22	19	19	16
Michigan State	CFP	Not released									24	12	17	16	16	16	
Minnesota	AP					RV											
Minnesota	C	RV	RV	RV	RV	RV											
Minnesota	CFP	Not released															
Nebraska	AP	RV	RV														
Nebraska	C	RV	RV														
Nebraska	CFP	Not released															
Northwestern	AP	RV	RV									RV	RV	23	20	20	17
Northwestern	C	RV	RV									RV	RV	23	20	20	17
Northwestern	CFP	Not released										25	23	22	21	21	
Ohio State	AP	2 (3)	2 (1)	8	10	11	10	9	6	6	3	11	8	8	8	5	5
Ohio State	C	2 (5)	2 (2)	9	9	9	9	8	6	6	3	11	8	8	7	5	5
Ohio State	CFP	Not released									6	13	9	9	8	5	
Penn State	AP	6	4	5	4	4	4	3	2	2	7	16	13	12	9	9	8
Penn State	C	6	4	5	4	4	4	3	2	2	7	13	11	11	10	9	8
Penn State	CFP	Not released									7	14	10	10	9	9	
Purdue	AP																
Purdue	C																
Purdue	CFP	Not released															
Rutgers	AP																
Rutgers	C																
Rutgers	CFP	Not released															
Wisconsin	AP	9	9	10	9	10	9	7	5	5	4	6	5	5	3 (10)	6	7
Wisconsin	C	10	11	12	10	10	8	6	5	5	4	3	4	4	3 (21)	6	6
Wisconsin	CFP	Not released									9	8	5	5	4	6	

Legend
	Improvement in ranking
	Drop in ranking
	Not ranked previous week
	No change in ranking from previous week
RV	Received votes but were not ranked in Top 25 of poll
т	Tied with team above or below also with this symbol

== Schedule ==
Index to colors and formatting
Big Ten member won
Big Ten member lost
Big Ten teams in **bold**

All times Eastern time.

† denotes Homecoming game

=== Regular season ===
==== Week 1 ====
Date	Time	Visiting team	Home team	Site	TV	Result	Attendance	Ref.
August 31	7:00 p.m.	Buffalo	**Minnesota**	TCF Bank Stadium • Minneapolis, MN	BTN	**W** 17–7	43,224	
August 31	8:00 p.m.	No. 2 **Ohio State**	**Indiana**	Memorial Stadium • Bloomington, IN	ESPN	**OSU** 49–21	52,929	
September 1	8:00 p.m.	No. 8 Washington	**Rutgers**	High Point Solutions Stadium • Piscataway, NJ	FS1	**L** 14–30	46,093	
September 1	9:00 p.m.	Utah State	No. 9 **Wisconsin**	Camp Randall Stadium • Madison, WI	ESPN	**W** 59–10	75,324	
September 2	12:00 p.m.	Akron	No. 6 **Penn State**	Beaver Stadium • University Park, PA	ABC	**W** 52–0	101,684	
September 2	12:00 p.m.	**Maryland**	No. 23 Texas	Darrell K. Royal Stadium • Austin, TX	FS1	**W** 51–41	88,396	
September 2	12:00 p.m.	Bowling Green	**Michigan State**	Spartan Stadium • East Lansing, MI	ESPNU	**W** 35–10	71,202	
September 2	12:00 p.m.	Wyoming	**Iowa**	Kinnick Stadium • Iowa City, IA	BTN	**W** 24–3	68,075	
September 2	12:00 p.m.	Ball State	**Illinois**	Memorial Stadium • Champaign, IL	BTN	**W** 24–21	42,505	
September 2	3:30 p.m.	No. 17 Florida	No. 11 **Michigan**	AT&T Stadium • Arlington, TX	ABC	**W** 33–17	75,802	
September 2	3:30 p.m.	Nevada	**Northwestern**	Ryan Field • Evanston, IL	BTN	**W** 31–20	33,018	
September 2	7:30 p.m.	No. 16 Louisville	**Purdue**	Lucas Oil Stadium • Indianapolis, IN	FOX	**L** 28–35	37,394	
September 2	8:00 p.m.	Arkansas State	**Nebraska**	Memorial Stadium • Lincoln, NE	BTN	**W** 43–36	90,171	
^{#}Rankings from AP Poll released prior to game. All times are in Eastern Time.

==== Week 2 ====
Date	Time	Visiting team	Home team	Site	TV	Result	Attendance	Ref.
September 8	8:00 p.m.	Ohio	**Purdue**	Ross–Ade Stadium • West Lafayette, IN	FS1	**W** 44–21	45,633	
September 9	12:00 p.m.	**Iowa**	Iowa State	Jack Trice Stadium • Ames, IA (Cy-Hawk Trophy)	ESPN2	**W** 44–41 ^{OT}	61,500	
September 9	12:00 p.m.	Towson	**Maryland**	Maryland Stadium • College Park, MD	BTN	**W** 63–17	37,105	
September 9	12:00 p.m.	Cincinnati	No. 8 **Michigan**	Michigan Stadium • Ann Arbor, MI	ABC	**W** 36–14	111,384	
September 9	12:00 p.m.	Florida Atlantic	No. 9 **Wisconsin**	Camp Randall Stadium • Madison, WI	BTN	**W** 31–14	77,542	
September 9	12:00 p.m.	**Northwestern**	Duke	Wallace Wade Stadium • Durham, NC	ESPNU	**L** 17–41	20,241	
September 9	3:30 p.m.	Western Michigan	**Michigan State**	Spartan Stadium • East Lansing, MI	BTN	**W** 28–14	72,910	
September 9	3:30 p.m.	Pittsburgh	No. 4 **Penn State**	Beaver Stadium • University Park, PA (PSU-Pitt Rivalry)	ABC	**W** 33–14	109,898	
September 9	3:30 p.m.	Eastern Michigan	**Rutgers**	High Point Solutions Stadium • Piscataway, NJ	BTN	**L** 13–16	37,661	
September 9	3:30 p.m.	**Indiana**	Virginia	Scott Stadium • Charlottesville, VA	ACCN	**W** 34–17	38,993	
September 9	4:30 p.m.	**Nebraska**	Oregon	Autzen Stadium • Eugene, OR	FOX	**L** 35–42	58,389	
September 9	7:30 p.m.	No. 5 Oklahoma	No. 2 **Ohio State**	Ohio Stadium • Columbus, OH	ABC	**L** 16–31	109,088	
September 9	8:00 p.m.	Western Kentucky	**Illinois**	Memorial Stadium • Champaign, IL	BTN	**W** 20–7	41,923	
September 9	10:00 p.m.	**Minnesota**	Oregon State	Reser Stadium • Corvallis, OR	FS1	**W** 48–14	35,206	
^{#}Rankings from AP Poll released prior to game. All times are in Eastern Time.

==== Week 3 ====
Date	Time	Visiting team	Home team	Site	TV	Result	Attendance	Ref.
September 15	7:00 p.m.	**Illinois**	No. 22 South Florida	Raymond James Stadium • Tampa, FL	ESPN	**L** 23–47	35,404	
September 16	12:00 p.m.	Air Force	No. 7 **Michigan**	Michigan Stadium • Ann Arbor, MI	BTN	**W** 29–13	111,387	
September 16	12:00 p.m.	Northern Illinois	**Nebraska**	Memorial Stadium • Lincoln, NE	FS1	**L** 17–21	89,664	
September 16	3:30 p.m.	Middle Tennessee	**Minnesota**	TCF Bank Stadium • Minneapolis, MN	BTN	**W** 34–3	43,727	
September 16	3:30 p.m.	Morgan State	**Rutgers**	High Point Solutions Stadium • Piscataway, NJ	BTN	**W** 65–0	39,892	
September 16	3:30 p.m.	No. 10 **Wisconsin**	BYU	LaVell Edwards Stadium • Provo, UT	ABC	**W** 40–6	61,143	
September 16	4:00 p.m.	**Purdue**	Missouri	Faurot Field • Columbia, MO	SEC Network	**W** 35–3	53,262	
September 16	4:30 p.m.	Army	No. 8 **Ohio State**	Ohio Stadium • Columbus, OH	FOX	**W** 38–7	108,414	
September 16	3:30 p.m.	North Texas	**Iowa**	Kinnick Stadium • Iowa City, IA	ESPN2	**W** 31–14	65,668	
September 16	7:30 p.m.	Georgia State	No. 5 **Penn State**	Beaver Stadium • University Park, PA	BTN	**W** 56–0	102,746	
September 16	7:30 p.m.	Bowling Green	**Northwestern**	Ryan Field • Evanston, IL	BTN	**W** 49–7	33,706	
^{#}Rankings from AP Poll released prior to game. All times are in Eastern Time.

Date	Bye Week		
September 16	Indiana*	Maryland	Michigan State

*The Florida International at Indiana game scheduled for this week was canceled due to Hurricane Irma

==== Week 4 ====
Date	Time	Visiting team	Home team	Site	TV	Result	Attendance	Ref.
September 23	12:00 p.m.	UNLV	No. 10 **Ohio State**	Ohio Stadium • Columbus, OH	BTN	**W** 54–21	106,187	
September 23	3:00 p.m.	Central Florida	**Maryland**	Maryland Stadium • College Park, MD	FS1	**L** 10–38	33,280	
September 23	3:30 p.m.	Georgia Southern	**Indiana**	Memorial Stadium • Bloomington, IN	BTN	**W** 52–17	42,886	
September 23†	3:30 p.m.	**Rutgers**	**Nebraska**	Memorial Stadium • Lincoln, NE	BTN	**NEB** 27–17	89,775	
September 23†	4:00 p.m.	No. 8 **Michigan**	**Purdue**	Ross–Ade Stadium • West Lafayette, IN	FOX	**MICH** 28–10	60,042	
September 23	7:30 p.m.	No. 4 **Penn State**	**Iowa**	Kinnick Stadium • Iowa City, IA	ABC	**PSU** 21–19	66,205	
September 23	8:00 p.m.	Notre Dame	**Michigan State**	Spartan Stadium • East Lansing, MI (Megaphone Trophy)	FOX	**L** 18–38	74,023	
^{#}Rankings from AP Poll released prior to game. All times are in Eastern Time.

Date	Bye Week			
September 23	Illinois	Minnesota	Northwestern	#9 Wisconsin

==== Week 5 ====
Date	Time	Visiting team	Home team	Site	TV	Result	Attendance	Ref.
September 29	8:00 p.m.	**Nebraska**	**Illinois**	Memorial Stadium • Champaign, IL	FS1	**NEB** 28–6	43,058	
September 30	12:00 p.m.	**Northwestern**	No. 10 **Wisconsin**	Camp Randall Stadium • Madison, WI	ABC	**WIS** 33–24	80,584	
September 30	12:00 p.m.	**Maryland**	**Minnesota**	TCF Bank Stadium • Minneapolis, MN	FS1	**MD** 31–24	43,511	
September 30	3:30 p.m.	**Indiana**	No. 4 **Penn State**	Beaver Stadium • University Park, PA	BTN	**PSU** 45–14	107,542	
September 30	4:00 p.m.	**Iowa**	**Michigan State**	Spartan Stadium • East Lansing, MI	FOX	**MSU** 17–10	73,331	
September 30	7:30 p.m.	No. 11 **Ohio State**	**Rutgers**	High Point Solutions Stadium • Piscataway, NJ	BTN	**OSU** 56–0	46,328	
^{#}Rankings from AP Poll released prior to game. All times are in Eastern Time.

Date	Bye Week	
September 30	#8 Michigan	Purdue

==== Week 6 ====
Date	Time	Visiting team	Home team	Site	TV	Result	Attendance	Ref.
October 7†	12:00 p.m.	**Illinois**	**Iowa**	Kinnick Stadium • Iowa City, IA	BTN	**IA** 45–16	69,894	
October 7†	12:00 p.m.	No. 4 **Penn State**	**Northwestern**	Ryan Field • Evanston, IL	ABC	**PSU** 31–7	41,061	
October 7	3:30 p.m.	**Minnesota**	**Purdue**	Ross–Ade Stadium • West Lafayette, IN	ESPN2	**PUR** 31–17	42,085	
October 7	3:30 p.m.	Charleston Southern	**Indiana**	Memorial Stadium • Bloomington, IN	BTN	**W** 27–0	35,995	
October 7†	4:00 p.m.	**Maryland**	No. 10 **Ohio State**	Ohio Stadium • Columbus, OH	FOX	**OSU** 62–14	107,180	
October 7	7:30 p.m.	**Michigan State**	No. 7 **Michigan**	Michigan Stadium • Ann Arbor, MI (Paul Bunyon Trophy)	ABC	**MSU** 14–10	112,432	
October 7	8:00 p.m.	No. 9 **Wisconsin**	**Nebraska**	Memorial Stadium • Lincoln, NE (Freedom Trophy)	BTN	**WIS** 38–17	89,860	
^{#}Rankings from AP Poll released prior to game. All times are in Eastern Time.

Date	Bye Week
October 7	Rutgers

*Indiana was originally scheduled for a bye week here, but lost a game on Sept. 16 against Florida International due to Hurricane Irma. IU picked up a game with Charleston Southern to make up for that lost game.

==== Week 7 ====
Date	Time	Visiting team	Home team	Site	TV	Result	Attendance	Ref.
October 14†	12:00 p.m.	No. 17 **Michigan**	**Indiana**	Memorial Stadium • Bloomington, IN	ABC	**MICH** 27–20 ^{OT}	52,929	
October 14	12:00 p.m.	**Rutgers**	**Illinois**	Memorial Stadium • Champaign, IL	BTN	**RUT** 35–24	35,765	
October 13	3:30 p.m.	**Northwestern**	**Maryland**	Maryland Stadium • College Park, MD	ESPN2	**NW** 37–21	38,325	
October 14	3:30 p.m.	**Purdue**	No. 7 **Wisconsin**	Camp Randall Stadium • Madison, WI	BTN	**WIS** 17–9	78,580	
October 14	7:30 p.m.	No. 9 **Ohio State**	**Nebraska**	Memorial Stadium • Lincoln, NE	FS1	**OSU** 56–14	89,346	
October 14	8:00 p.m.	No. 21 **Michigan State**	**Minnesota**	TCF Bank Stadium • Minneapolis, MN	BTN	**MSU** 30–27	47,541	
^{#}Rankings from AP Poll released prior to game. All times are in Eastern Time.

Date	Bye Week	
October 14	Iowa	#3 Penn State

==== Week 8 ====
Date	Time	Visiting team	Home team	Site	TV	Result	Attendance	Ref.
October 21	12:00 p.m.	**Iowa**	**Northwestern**	Ryan Field • Evanston, IL	ESPN2	**NW** 17–10 ^{OT}	40,036	
October 21†	12:00 p.m.	**Purdue**	**Rutgers**	High Point Solutions Stadium • Piscataway, NJ	BTN	**RUT** 14–12	38,278	
October 21†	12:00 p.m.	**Maryland**	No. 5 **Wisconsin**	Camp Randall Stadium • Madison, WI	FOX	**WIS** 38–13	78,058	
October 21†	3:30 p.m.	**Indiana**	No. 18 **Michigan State**	Spartan Stadium • East Lansing, MI (Old Brass Spittoon)	ABC	**MSU** 17–9	74,111	
October 21†	3:30 p.m.	**Illinois**	**Minnesota**	TCF Bank Stadium • Minneapolis, MN	BTN	**MIN** 24–17	45,243	
October 21	7:30 p.m.	No. 19 **Michigan**	No. 2 **Penn State**	Beaver Stadium • University Park, PA	ABC	**PSU** 42–13	110,823	
^{#}Rankings from AP Poll released prior to game. All times are in Eastern Time.

Date	Bye Week	
October 21	Nebraska	#6 Ohio State

==== Week 9 ====
Date	Time	Visiting team	Home team	Site	TV	Result	Attendance	Ref.
October 28†	12:00 p.m.	No. 5 **Wisconsin**	**Illinois**	Memorial Stadium • Champaign, IL	ESPN	**WIS** 24–10	42,101	
October 28†	12:00 p.m.	**Rutgers**	**Michigan**	Michigan Stadium • Ann Arbor, MI	BTN	**MICH** 35–14	111,213	
October 28	3:30 p.m.	No. 16 **Michigan State**	**Northwestern**	Ryan Field • Evanston, IL	ESPN	**NW** 39–31 ^{3OT}	39,369	
October 28	3:30 p.m.	No. 2 **Penn State**	No. 6 **Ohio State**	Ohio Stadium • Columbus, OH (OSU-PSU Rivalry)	FOX	**OSU** 39–38	109,302	
October 28†	3:30 p.m.	**Indiana**	**Maryland**	Maryland Stadium • College Park, MD	BTN	**MD** 42–39	35,144	
October 28	6:30 p.m.	**Minnesota**	**Iowa**	Kinnick Stadium • Iowa City, IA (Floyd of Rosedale)	FS1	**IA** 17–10	66,292	
October 28	7:30 p.m.	**Nebraska**	**Purdue**	Ross–Ade Stadium • West Lafayette, IN	BTN	**NEB** 25–24	41,411	
^{#}Rankings from AP Poll released prior to game. All times are in Eastern Time.

==== Week 10 ====
Date	Time	Visiting team	Home team	Site	TV	Result	Attendance	Ref.
November 4	12:00 p.m.	**Illinois**	**Purdue**	Ross–Ade Stadium • West Lafayette, IN (Purdue Cannon)	BTN	**PUR** 29–10	46,027	
November 4	12:00 p.m.	No. 4 **Wisconsin**	**Indiana**	Memorial Stadium • Bloomington, IN	ABC	**WIS** 45–17	43,027	
November 4	12:00 p.m.	No. 7 **Penn State**	No. 24 **Michigan State**	Spartan Stadium • East Lansing, MI (Land Grant Trophy)	FOX	**MSU** 27–24	71,605	
November 4	3:30 p.m.	No. 3 **Ohio State**	**Iowa**	Kinnick Stadium • Iowa City, IA	ESPN	**IA** 55–24	67,669	
November 4	3:30 p.m.	**Maryland**	**Rutgers**	High Point Solutions Stadium • Piscataway, NJ (MD-RU Rivalry)	BTN	**RUT** 31–24	34,972	
November 4	3:30 p.m.	**Northwestern**	**Nebraska**	Memorial Stadium • Lincoln, NE	BTN	**NW** 31–24 ^{OT}	89,721	
November 4	6:30 p.m.	**Minnesota**	**Michigan**	Michigan Stadium • Ann Arbor, MI (Little Brown Jug)	FOX	**MICH** 33–10	111,090	
^{#}Rankings from AP Poll released prior to game. All times are in Eastern Time.

==== Week 11 ====
Date	Time	Visiting team	Home team	Site	TV	Result	Attendance	Ref.
November 11†	12:00 p.m.	**Rutgers**	No. 16 **Penn State**	Beaver Stadium • University Park, PA	BTN	**PSU** 35–6	107,531	
November 11	12:00 p.m.	**Nebraska**	**Minnesota**	TCF Bank Stadium • Minneapolis, MN (MN-NEB Rivalry)	FS1	**MIN** 54–21	39,993	
November 11	12:00 p.m.	**Indiana**	**Illinois**	Memorial Stadium • Champaign, IL	BTN	**IND** 24–14	40,195	
November 11	12:00 p.m.	No. 13 **Michigan State**	No. 11 **Ohio State**	Ohio Stadium • Columbus, OH	FOX	**OSU** 48–3	107,011	
November 11	3:30 p.m.	No. 25 **Iowa**	No. 6 **Wisconsin**	Camp Randall Stadium • Madison, WI (Heartland Trophy)	ABC	**WIS** 38–14	80,462	
November 11	3:30 p.m.	No. 21 **Michigan**	**Maryland**	Maryland Stadium • College Park, MD	BTN	**MICH** 35–10	44,325	
November 11	7:00 p.m.	**Purdue**	**Northwestern**	Ryan Field • Evanston, IL	ESPN2	**NW** 23–13	33,765	
^{#}Rankings from AP Poll released prior to game. All times are in Eastern Time.

==== Week 12 ====
Date	Time	Visiting team	Home team	Site	TV	Result	Attendance	Ref.
November 18	12:00 p.m.	No. 19 **Michigan**	No. 5 **Wisconsin**	Camp Randall Stadium • Madison, WI	FOX	**WIS** 24–10	81,216	
November 18	12:00 p.m.	**Rutgers**	**Indiana**	Memorial Stadium • Bloomington, IN	BTN	**IND** 41–0	35,949	
November 18	12:00 p.m.	**Minnesota**	**Northwestern**	Ryan Field • Evanston, IL	BTN	**NW** 39–0	30,014	
November 18	3:30 p.m.	**Illinois**	No. 8 **Ohio State**	Ohio Stadium • Columbus, OH (Illibuck)	ABC	**OSU** 52–14	105,282	
November 18	3:30 p.m.	**Purdue**	**Iowa**	Kinnick Stadium • Iowa City, IA	BTN	**PUR** 24–15	60,554	
November 18	4:00 p.m.	**Maryland**	No. 22 **Michigan State**	Spartan Stadium • East Lansing, MI	FOX	**MSU** 17–7	70,216	
November 18	4:00 p.m.	**Nebraska**	No. 13 **Penn State**	Beaver Stadium • University Park, PA	FS1	**PSU** 56–44	106,722	
^{#}Rankings from AP Poll released prior to game. All times are in Eastern Time.

==== Week 13 ====
Date	Time	Visiting team	Home team	Site	TV	Result	Attendance	Ref.
November 24	4:00 p.m.	**Iowa**	Nebraska	Memorial Stadium • Lincoln, NE (Heroes Game)	FS1	**IA** 56–14	90,046	
November 25	12:00 p.m.	No. 8 **Ohio State**	Michigan	Michigan Stadium • Ann Arbor, MI (The Game)	FOX	**OSU** 31–20	112,028	
November 25	12:00 p.m.	**Indiana**	Purdue	Ross–Ade Stadium • West Lafayette, IN (Old Oaken Bucket)	ESPN2	**PUR** 31–24	52,105	
November 25	3:30 p.m.	No. 12 **Penn State**	Maryland	Maryland Stadium • College Park, MD (MD-PSU Rivalry)	BTN	**PSU** 66–3	49,680	
November 25	3:30 p.m.	No. 5 **Wisconsin**	Minnesota	TCF Bank Stadium • Minneapolis, MN (Paul Bunyan's Axe)	ABC	**WIS** 31–0	47,327	
November 25	4:00 p.m.	No. 23 **Northwestern**	Illinois	Memorial Stadium • Champaign, IL (Land of Lincoln Trophy)	FS1	**NW** 42–7	30,456	
November 25	4:00 p.m.	No. 21 **Michigan State**	Rutgers	High Point Solutions Stadium • Piscataway, NJ	FOX	**MSU** 40–7	35,021	
^{#}Rankings from AP Poll released prior to game. All times are in Eastern Time.

=== Championship game ===
==== Week 14 (Big Ten Championship Game) ====
Date	Time	Visiting team	Home team	Site	TV	Result	Attendance	Ref.
December 2	8:00 p.m.	No. 8 Ohio State	No. 3 Wisconsin	Lucas Oil Stadium • Indianapolis, IN	FOX	**OSU** 27–21	65,886	
^{#}Rankings from AP Poll released prior to game. All times are in Eastern Time.

== Bowl games ==
Legend
Big Ten win
Big Ten loss

Bowl game	Date	Site	Television	Time (EST)	Big Ten team	Opponent	Score	Attendance	Ref.
Pinstripe Bowl	December 27	Yankee Stadium • New York, NY	ESPN	5:15 p.m.	Iowa	Boston College	27–20	37,667	
Foster Farms Bowl	December 27	Levi's Stadium • Santa Clara, CA	FOX	8:30 p.m.	Purdue	Arizona	38–35	28,436	
Holiday Bowl	December 28	SDCCU Stadium • San Diego, CA	FS1	9:00 p.m.	#18 Michigan State	#21 Washington State	42–17	47,092	
Music City Bowl	December 29	Nissan Stadium • Nashville, TN	ESPN	4:30 p.m.	#20 Northwestern	Kentucky	24–23	48,675	
Outback Bowl	January 1	Raymond James Stadium • Tampa, FL	ESPN2	12:00 p.m.	Michigan	South Carolina	26–19	45,687	
New Year's Six Bowls
Cotton Bowl	December 29	AT&T Stadium • Arlington, TX	ESPN	8:30 p.m.	#5 Ohio State	#8 USC	24–7	67,510	
Fiesta Bowl	December 30	University of Phoenix Stadium • Glendale, AZ	ESPN	4:00 p.m.	#9 Penn State	#12 Washington	35–28	61,842	
Orange Bowl	December 30	Hard Rock Stadium • Miami Gardens, FL	ESPN	8:00 p.m.	#6 Wisconsin	#11 Miami (FL)	34–24	65,032	

Rankings are from AP Poll. All times Eastern Time Zone.

== Big Ten vs Other Conferences ==
2017-2018 records against non-conference foes:

Regular Season

Power 5 Conferences	Record
ACC	2–2
Big 12	2–1
Notre Dame	0–1
Pac-12	1–2
SEC	2–0
Power 5 Total	7–6
Other FBS Conferences	Record
American	1–2
C-USA	4–0
MAC	7–2
Mountain West	5–0
Independents (Excluding Notre Dame)	2–0
Sun Belt	3–0
Other FBS Total	22–4
FCS Opponents	Record
Football Championship Subdivision	3–0
Total Non-Conference Record	32–10

Post Season

Power Conferences 5	Record
ACC	2–0
Big 12	0–0
Notre Dame	0–0
Pac-12	4–0
SEC	1–1
Power 5 Total	7–1
Other FBS Conferences	Record
American	0–0
C–USA	0–0
Independents (Excluding Notre Dame)	0–0
MAC	0–0
Mountain West	0–0
Sun Belt	0–0
Other FBS Total	0–0
Total Bowl Record	7–1

== Awards and honors ==
=== Player of the week honors ===
Week	Offensive			Defensive			Special Teams			Freshman		
Week	Player	Position	Team	Player	Position	Team	Player	Position	Team	Player	Position	Team
Week 1	J. T. Barrett	QB	OSU	Josey Jewell	LB	IA	Antoine Brooks	DB	MD	J. K. Dobbins	RB	OSU
Week 1	Saquon Barkley	RB	PSU	Josey Jewell	LB	IA	Quinn Nordin	PK	MICH	J. K. Dobbins	RB	OSU
Week 2	Nate Stanley	QB	IA	Tyree Kinnel	DB	MICH	J-Shun Harris II	WR	IND	Jonathan Taylor	RB	WIS
Week 2	Jonathan Taylor	RB	WIS	Tyree Kinnel	DB	MICH	J-Shun Harris II	WR	IND	Jonathan Taylor	RB	WIS
Week 3	Alex Hornibrook	QB	WIS	Jacob Huff	DB	MINN	Quinn Nordin	PK	MICH	J. K. Dobbins	RB	OSU
Week 3	Alex Hornibrook	QB	WIS	Jacob Huff	DB	MINN	Quinn Nordin	PK	MICH	Jonathan Lewis	QB	RUT
Week 4	Saquon Barkley	RB	PSU	Josey Jewell	LB	IA	J-Shun Harris II	WR	IND	Morgan Ellison	RB	IND
Week 4	Saquon Barkley	RB	PSU	Chase Winovich	DL	MICH	J-Shun Harris II	WR	IND	Morgan Ellison	RB	IND
Week 5	Felton Davis III	WR	MSU	Natrell Jamerson	S	WIS	Saquon Barkley	RB	PSU	Ben Stille	LB	NEB
Week 5	DaeSean Hamilton	WR	PSU	Natrell Jamerson	S	WIS	Saquon Barkley	RB	PSU	Ben Stille	LB	NEB
Week 6	Jonathan Taylor	RB	WIS	Joe Bachie	LB	MSU	Ty Johnson	RB	MD	Jonathan Taylor	RB	WIS
Week 7	J. T. Barrett	QB	OSU	Leon Jacobs	LB	WIS	Charlie Kuhbander	PK	NW	Jonathan Taylor	RB	WIS
Week 8	Saquon Barkley	RB	PSU	Joe Bachie	LB	MSU	Hunter Niswander	P	NW	Jonathan Taylor	RB	WIS
Week 8	Saquon Barkley	RB	PSU	Jason Cabinda	LB	PSU	Hunter Niswander	P	NW	Jonathan Taylor	RB	WIS
Week 9	J. T. Barrett	QB	OSU	Paddy Fisher	LB	NW	Saquon Barkley	RB	PSU	Whop Philyor	WR	IND
Week 9	J. T. Barrett	QB	OSU	Paddy Fisher	LB	NW	Saquon Barkley	RB	PSU	Cody White	WR	MSU
Week 10	Chris Evans	RB	MICH	Josh Jackson	DB	IA	Matt Coghlin	PK	MSU	Jonathan Taylor	RB	WIS
Week 10	Karan Higdon	RB	MICH	Khaleke Hudson	LB/DB	MICH	Matt Coghlin	PK	MSU	Jonathan Taylor	RB	WIS
Week 11	Demry Croft	QB	MINN	Josh Jackson	DB	IA	Rodney Smith	RB	MINN	Jonathan Taylor	RB	WIS
Week 11	Mike Weber	RB	OSU	Leon Jacobs	LB	WIS	Rodney Smith	RB	MINN	Jonathan Taylor	RB	WIS
Week 12	Saquon Barkley	RB	PSU	Nate Hall	LB	NW	Nick Nelson	CB	WIS	Morgan Ellison	RB	IND
Week 12	Anthony Mahoungou	WR	PUR	Nate Hall	LB	NW	Nick Nelson	CB	WIS	Jonathan Taylor	RB	WIS
Week 13	Markell Jones	RB	PUR	Sam Hubbard	DE	OSU	Hunter Niswander	P	NW	Jonathan Taylor	RB	WIS
Week 13	Akrum Wadley	RB	IA	Sam Hubbard	DE	OSU	Hunter Niswander	P	NW	Jonathan Taylor	RB	WIS

=== Big Ten Individual Awards ===
The following individuals won the conference's annual player and coach awards:

Award	Player	School
Graham-George Offensive Player of the Year	Saquon Barkley	Penn State
Nagurski-Woodson Defensive Player of the Year	Josey Jewell	Iowa
Thompson-Randle El Freshman of the Year	Jonathan Taylor	Wisconsin
Griese-Brees Quarterback of the Year	J. T. Barrett	Ohio State
Richter-Howard Receiver of the Year	D. J. Moore	Maryland
Ameche-Dayne Running Back of the Year	Saquon Barkley	Penn State
Kwalick-Clark Tight End of the Year	Troy Fumagalli	Wisconsin
Rimington-Pace Offensive Lineman of the Year	Billy Price	Ohio State
Smith-Brown Defensive Lineman of the Year	Nick Bosa	Ohio State
Butkus-Fitzgerald Linebacker of the Year	Josey Jewell	Iowa
Tatum-Woodson Defensive Back of the Year	Josh Jackson	Iowa
Bakken-Andersen Kicker of the Year	Griffin Oakes	Indiana
Eddleman-Fields Punter of the Year	Ryan Anderson	Rutgers
Rodgers-Dwight Return Specialist of the Year	Saquon Barkley	Penn State
Hayes-Schembechler Coach of the Year (coaches vote)	Paul Chryst	Wisconsin
Dave McClain Coach of the Year (media vote)	Paul Chryst	Wisconsin
Dungy-Thompson Humanitarian Award	Chad Greenway	Iowa
Ford-Kinnick Leadership Award	Troy Vincent	Wisconsin

=== All-Conference Teams ===
2017 Big Ten All-Conference Teams and Awards

Position	Player	Team
First Team Offense (Coaches)
QB	J. T. Barrett	Ohio State
RB	Saquon Barkley	Penn State
RB	Jonathan Taylor	Wisconsin
WR	Simmie Cobbs	Indiana
WR	D. J. Moore	Maryland
TE	Troy Fumagalli	Wisconsin
C	Billy Price	Ohio State
OG	Michael Jordan	Ohio State
OG	Beau Benzschawel	Wisconsin
OT	Jamarco Jones	Ohio State
OT	Michael Deiter	Wisconsin
First Team Defense (Coaches)
DL	Rashan Gary	Michigan
DL	Maurice Hurst Jr.	Michigan
DL	Nick Bosa	Ohio State
DL	Tyquan Lewis	Ohio State
LB	Josey Jewell	Iowa
LB	Devin Bush Jr.	Michigan
LB	T. J. Edwards	Wisconsin
DB	Josh Jackson	Iowa
DB	Marcus Allen	Penn State
DB	D'Cota Dixon	Wisconsin
DB	Nick Nelson	Wisconsin
First Team Special Teams (Coaches)
K	Griffin Oakes	Indiana
P	Ryan Anderson	Rutgers
RS	Saquon Barkley	Penn State

Position	Player	Team
Second Team Offense (Coaches)
QB	Trace McSorley	Penn State
RB	Justin Jackson	Northwestern
RB	J. K. Dobbins	Ohio State
WR	Stanley Morgan Jr.	Nebraska
WR	DaeSean Hamilton	Penn State
TE	Mike Gesicki	Penn State
C	Brian Allen	Michigan State
OG	Sean Welsh	Iowa
OG	Ben Bredeson	Michigan
OT	Mason Cole	Michigan
OT	David Edwards	Wisconsin
Second Team Defense (Coaches)
DL	Chase Winovich	Michigan
DL	Sam Hubbard	Ohio State
DL	Alec James	Wisconsin
DL	Conor Sheehy	Wisconsin
LB	Tegray Scales	Indiana
LB	Jason Cabinda	Penn State
LB	Garrett Dooley	Wisconsin
DB	Lavert Hill	Michigan
DB	Godwin Igwebuike	Northwestern
DB	Denzel Ward	Ohio State
DB	Amani Oruwariye	Penn State
Second Team Special Teams (Coaches)
K	Rafael Gaglianone	Wisconsin
P	Blake Gillikin	Penn State
RS	DeAndre Thompkins	Penn State

Position	Player	Team
Third Team Offense (Coaches)
QB	Clayton Thorson	Northwestern
RB	Akrum Wadley	Iowa
RB	Karan Higdon	Michigan
WR	Felton Davis III	Michigan State
WR	Parris Campbell	Ohio State
TE	Noah Fant	Iowa
C	Tyler Biadasz	Wisconsin
OG	David Beedle	Michigan State
OG	Tommy Doles	Northwestern
OT	Isaiah Prince	Ohio State
OT	Ryan Bates	Penn State
Third Team Defense (Coaches)
DL	Kenny Willekes	Michigan State
DL	Joe Gaziano	Northwestern
DL	Dre'Mont Jones	Ohio State
DL	Gelen Robinson	Purdue
LB	Khaleke Hudson	Michigan
LB	Joe Bachie	Michigan State
LB	Paddy Fisher	Northwestern
DB	Rashard Fant	Indiana
DB	Kyle Queiro	Northwestern
DB	Jordan Fuller	Ohio State
DB	Derrick Tindal	Wisconsin
Third Team Special Teams (Coaches)
K	Sean Nuernberger	Ohio State
P	Drue Chrisman	Ohio State
RS	Parris Campbell	Ohio State

Coaches Honorable Mention: ILLINOIS: Nick Allegretti, James Crawford, Jaylen Dunlap, Stanley Green; INDIANA: Chris Covington, Jonathan Crawford, J'Shun Harris, Wes Martin, Luke Timian, Ian Thomas, Haydon Whitehead; IOWA: Nathan Bazata, James Daniels, Anthony Nelson, Ben Niemann; MARYLAND: Derwin Gray, J. C. Jackson, Darnell Savage; MICHIGAN: Chris Evans, Tyree Kinnel, Mike McCray, Josh Metellus, Quinn Nordin, Brad Robbins; MICHIGAN STATE: Luke Campbell, David Dowell, Kevin Jarvis, Justin Layne, Brian Lewerke, L. J. Scott, Josiah Scott, Khari Willis; MINNESOTA: Thomas Barber, Emmitt Carpenter, Carter Coughlin, Tyler Johnson, Steven Richardson, Ryan Santoso, Rodney Smith; NEBRASKA: Drew Brown, Jerald Foster, Nick Gates, JD Spielman (WR, KR); NORTHWESTERN: Garrett Dickerson, Nate Hall, Charlie Kuhbander, Tyler Lancaster, Samdup Miller; OHIO STATE: Jerome Baker, Marcus Baugh, K. J. Hill, Jalyn Holmes, Damon Webb, Mike Weber, Chris Worley; PENN STATE: Christian Campbell, Curtis Cothran, Grant Haley, Juwan Johnson, Shareef Miller; PURDUE: Ja'Whaun Bentley, Danny Ezechukwu, Lorenzo Neal, David Steinmetz, Jacob Thieneman; RUTGERS: Tariq Cole, Gus Edwards, Kiy Hester, Sebastian Joseph-Day, Dorian Miller; WISCONSIN: Quintez Cephus, Ryan Connelly, Joe Ferguson, Alex Hornibrook, Leon Jacobs, Natrell Jamerson, Olive Sagapolu.

Position	Player	Team
First Team Offense (Media)
QB	J. T. Barrett	Ohio State
RB	Saquon Barkley	Penn State
RB	Jonathan Taylor	Wisconsin
WR	Simmie Cobbs	Indiana
WR	D. J. Moore	Maryland
TE	Mike Gesicki	Penn State
C	Billy Price	Ohio State
OG	Sean Welsh	Iowa
OG	Beau Benzschawel	Wisconsin
OT	Jamarco Jones	Ohio State
OT	Michael Deiter	Wisconsin
First Team Defense (Media)
DL	Maurice Hurst Jr.	Michigan
DL	Chase Winovich	Michigan
DL	Nick Bosa	Ohio State
DL	Tyquan Lewis	Ohio State
LB	Tegray Scales	Indiana
LB	Josey Jewell	Iowa
LB	T. J. Edwards	Wisconsin
DB	Josh Jackson	Iowa
DB	David Dowell	Michigan State
DB	Denzel Ward	Ohio State
DB	Nick Nelson	Wisconsin
First Team Special Teams (Media)
K	Griffin Oakes	Indiana
P	Ryan Anderson	Rutgers
RS	Saquon Barkley	Penn State

Position	Player	Team
Second Team Offense (Media)
QB	Trace McSorley	Penn State
RB	Justin Jackson	Northwestern
RB	J. K. Dobbins	Ohio State
WR	Felton Davis III	Michigan State
WR	Stanley Morgan Jr.	Nebraska
TE	Troy Fumagalli	Wisconsin
C	Brian Allen	Michigan State
OG	Ben Bredeson	Michigan
OG	Michael Jordan	Ohio State
OT	Mason Cole	Michigan
OT	David Edwards	Wisconsin
Second Team Defense (Media)
DL	Rashan Gary	Michigan
DL	Joe Gaziano	Northwestern
DL	Sam Hubbard	Ohio State
DL	Alec James	Wisconsin
LB	Devin Bush Jr.	Michigan
LB	Khaleke Hudson	Michigan
LB	Paddy Fisher	Northwestern
DB	Rashard Fant	Indiana
DB	Godwin Igwebuike	Northwestern
DB	Marcus Allen	Penn State
DB	Amani Oruwariye	Penn State
Second Team Special Teams (Media)
K	Rafael Gaglianone	Wisconsin
P	Blake Gillikin	Penn State
RS	Parris Campbell	Ohio State

Position	Player	Team
Third Team Offense (Media)
QB	Clayton Thorson	Northwestern
RB	Akrum Wadley	Iowa
RB	Karan Higdon	Michigan
WR	JD Spielman	Nebraska
WR	DaeSean Hamilton	Penn State
TE	Noah Fant	Iowa
C	Tyler Biadasz	Wisconsin
OG	David Beedle	Michigan State
OG	Tommy Doles	Northwestern
OT	Isaiah Prince	Ohio State
OT	Ryan Bates	Penn State
Third Team Defense (Media)
DL	Anthony Nelson	Iowa
DL	Kenny Willekes	Michigan State
DL	Shareef Miller	Penn State
DL	Conor Sheehy	Wisconsin
LB	Joe Bachie	Michigan State
LB	Thomas Barber	Minnesota
LB	Garrett Dooley	Wisconsin
DB	Josiah Scott	Michigan State
DB	Kyle Queiro	Northwestern
DB	Damon Webb	Ohio State
DB	D'Cota Dixon	Wisconsin
Third Team Special Teams (Media)
K	Sean Nuernberger	Ohio State
P	Drue Chrisman	Ohio State
RS	DeAndre Thompkins	Penn State

Media Honorable Mention: ILLINOIS: Nick Allegretti, Blake Hayes, Stanley Green; INDIANA: Chris Covington, Jonathan Crawford, Chase Dutra, J'Shun Harris, Wes Martin, Robert McCray, Luke Timian, Ian Thomas, Haydon Whitehead; IOWA: Nathan Bazata, James Daniels, Ben Niemann, Nate Stanley; MARYLAND: Antoine Brooks, Jermaine Carter, Derwin Gray, J. C. Jackson, Ty Johnson, Darnell Savage; MICHIGAN: Zach Gentry, Lavert Hill, Tyree Kinnel, Patrick Kugler, David Long, Mike McCray, Sean McKeon, Josh Metellus, Quinn Nordin, Donovan Peoples-Jones; MICHIGAN STATE: Luke Campbell, Matt Coghlin, Chris Frey, Jake Hartbarger, Kevin Jarvis, Justin Layne, Brian Lewerke, Mike Panasiuk, L. J. Scott, Raequan Williams, Khari Willis; MINNESOTA: Emmitt Carpenter, Carter Coughlin, Donnell Greene, Tyler Johnson, Steven Richardson, Ryan Santoso, Rodney Smith; NEBRASKA: Drew Brown, Jerald Foster, Nick Gates, De'Mornay Pierson-El, JD Spielman; NORTHWESTERN: Garrett Dickerson, Nate Hall, Charlie Kuhbander, Tyler Lancaster, Samdup Miller; OHIO STATE: Damon Arnette, Jerome Baker, Marcus Baugh, Johnnie Dixon, Jordan Fuller, K. J. Hill, Jalyn Holmes, Dre'Mont Jones, Mike Weber, Chris Worley; PENN STATE: Troy Apke, Jason Cabinda, Christian Campbell, Parker Cothren, Grant Haley, Juwan Johnson; PURDUE: Markus Bailey, Kirk Barron, Ja'Whaun Bentley, Danny Ezechukwu, Da'Wan Hunte, Lorenzo Neal, Josh Okonye, Gelen Robinson, Joe Schopper, David Steinmetz; RUTGERS: Tariq Cole, Damon Hayes, Kiy Hester, Dorian Miller, Trevor Morris; WISCONSIN: Quintez Cephus, Ryan Connelly, Joe Ferguson, Alex Hornibrook, Leon Jacobs, Natrell Jamerson, Olive Sagapolu, Derrick Tindal.

=== All-Americans ===
The 2017 College Football All-America Team is composed of the following College Football All-American first teams chosen by the following selector organizations: Associated Press (AP), Football Writers Association of America (FWAA), American Football Coaches Association (AFCA), Walter Camp Foundation (WCFF), The Sporting News (TSN), Sports Illustrated (SI), USA Today (USAT) ESPN, CBS Sports (CBS), FOX Sports (FOX) College Football News (CFN), Bleacher Report (BR), Scout.com, Phil Steele (PS), SB Nation (SB), Athlon Sports, Pro Football Focus (PFF) and Yahoo! Sports (Yahoo!).

Currently, the NCAA compiles consensus all-America teams in the sports of Division I-FBS football and Division I men's basketball using a point system computed from All-America teams named by coaches associations or media sources. The system consists of three points for a first-team honor, two points for second-team honor, and one point for third-team honor. Honorable mention and fourth team or lower recognitions are not accorded any points. Football consensus teams are compiled by position and the player accumulating the most points at each position is named first team consensus all-American. Currently, the NCAA recognizes All-Americans selected by the AP, AFCA, FWAA, TSN, and the WCFF to determine Consensus and Unanimous All-Americans. Any player named to the First Team by all five of the NCAA-recognized selectors is deemed a Unanimous All-American.

Position	Player	School	Selector	Unanimous	Consensus
First Team All-Americans
RB	Saquon Barkley	Penn State	WCFF, AFCA, SB		
OG	Beau Benzschawel	Wisconsin	SI		
OT	David Edwards	Wisconsin	AFCA		
C	Billy Price	Ohio State	AP, FWAA, WCFF, TSN, AFCA, SI, USAT, ESPN, SB, BR	*	
DT	Maurice Hurst Jr.	Michigan	AP, TSN, USAT, ESPN, CBS, PFF		
DE	Nick Bosa	Ohio State	AFCA, SB		
LB	Josey Jewell	Iowa	AP, FWAA, WCFF, TSN, AFCA, SI, USAT, ESPN, CBS, SB, BR	*	
LB	Ja'Whaun Bentley	Purdue	PFF		
LB	T. J. Edwards	Wisconsin	AP, USAT, ESPN, SB, BR		
CB	Josh Jackson	Iowa	AP, FWAA, WCFF, TSN, AFCA, SI, USAT, ESPN, CBS, SB, PFF, BR	*	
CB	Denzel Ward	Ohio State	AP, TSN, AFCA, USAT, ESPN, CBS, SB, PFF, BR		
AP	Saquon Barkley	Penn State	AP, FWAA, TSN, SI, ESPN, CBS		

Position	Player	School	Selector
Second Team All-Americans
RB	Saquon Barkley	Penn State	SI, USAT, CBS, PFF
RB	Jonathan Taylor	Wisconsin	AP, FWAA, WCFF, TSN, USAT, CBS, SB
TE	Troy Fumagalli	Wisconsin	AP, FWAA, WCFF, AFCA, SI
TE	Mike Gesicki	Penn State	TSN, SB
C	Billy Price	Ohio State	CBS
OG	Michael Jordan	Ohio State	SB
OL	David Edwards	Wisconsin	FWAA, WCFF
OT	Michael Deiter	Wisconsin	TSN
DT	Maurice Hurst Jr.	Michigan	FWAA, WCFF, AFCA, SB
DE	Nick Bosa	Ohio State	AP, WCFF, TSN, USAT, CBS
LB	T. J. Edwards	Wisconsin	WCFF, TSN, AFCA, PFF
LB	Devin Bush Jr.	Michigan	WCFF
CB	Nick Nelson	Wisconsin	CBS, PFF
CB	Denzel Ward	Ohio State	FWAA
S	Natrell Jamerson	Wisconsin	PFF

Position	Player	School	Selector
Third Team All-Americans
OT	David Edwards	Wisconsin	AP
OG	Beau Benzschawel	Wisconsin	AP
LB	Devin Bush	Michigan	AP

*Sports Illustrated All-America Team (SI)
*SB Nation All-America Team (SB)
*Pro Football Focus All-America Team (PFF)
*Walter Camp Football Foundation All-America Team (WCFF)
*Bleacher Report All-America Team (BR)
*Associated Press All-America Team (AP)
*USA Today All-America Team (USAT)
*Football Writers Association of America All-America Team (FWAA)
*ESPN All-America Team (ESPN)
*CBS Sports All-America Team (CBS)
*The Sporting News All-America Team (TSN)
*AFCA All-America Team (AFCA)

=== Academic All-Americans ===
2017 CoSIDA Academic-All Americans

Player	School	Team
CoSIDA Academic All-Americans
Anthony Nelson	Iowa	First Team
Cole Chewins	Michigan State	First Team
Chris Weber	Nebraska	First Team
Ryan Anderson	Rutgers	First Team
Parker Hesse	Iowa	Second Team
Jordan Fuller	Ohio State	Second Team

=== National award winners ===
Rimington Award (Best Center)
Billy Price, Ohio State

Paul Hornung Award (Most Versatile Player)
Saquon Barkley, Penn State

Lott IMPACT Trophy (Outstanding Defensive Player)
Josey Jewell, Iowa

== Attendance ==
Through Games of November 25, 2017

Team	Stadium	Capacity	Game 1	Game 2	Game 3	Game 4	Game 5	Game 6	Game 7	Game 8	Total	Average	% of Capacity
Illinois	Memorial Stadium	60,670	42,505	41,923	43,058†	35,765	42,101	40,195	30,456	–	276,003	39,429	65.0%
Indiana	Memorial Stadium	52,929	**52,929**†	42,886	35,995	**52,929**†	43,027	35,949	–	–	263,715	43,953	83.0%
Iowa	Kinnick Stadium	70,585	68,075	65,668	66,205	69,894†	66,292	67,669	60,554	–	464,357	66,337	94.0%
Maryland	Maryland Stadium	51,802	37,105	33,280	38,325	35,144	44,325	49,680†	–	–	237,859	39,643	76.5%
Michigan	Michigan Stadium	107,601	**111,384**	**111,387**	**112,432**†	**111,213**	**111,090**	**112,028**	–	–	669,534	111,589	103.7%
Michigan State	Spartan Stadium	75,005	71,202	72,910	74,023	73,331	74,111†	71,605	70,216		507,398	72,485	96.6%
Minnesota	TCF Bank Stadium	50,805	43,224	43,727	43,511	47,541†	45,243	39,993	47,327	–	310,566	44,367	87.3%
Nebraska	Memorial Stadium	85,458	**90,171**†	**89,664**	**89,775**	**89,860**	**89,346**	**89,721**	**90,046**	–	628,583	89,798	105.1%
Northwestern	Ryan Field	47,130	33,018	33,706	41,061†	40,036	39,369	33,765	30,014	–	250,969	35,853	76.1%
Ohio State	Ohio Stadium	104,944	**109,088**	**108,414**	**106,187**	**107,180**	**109,302**†	**107,011**	**105,282**	–	752,014	107,431	102.4%
Penn State	Beaver Stadium	106,572	101,684	**109,898**	102,746	**107,542**	**110,823**†	**107,531**	**106,722**	–	746,946	106,707	100.1%
Purdue	Ross–Ade Stadium	57,236	45,633	**60,042**†	42,085	41,411	46,027	52,105	–	–	287,303	47,884	83.7%
Rutgers	High Point Solutions Stadium	52,454	46,093	37,661	39,892	46,328†	38,278	34,972	35,021	–	278,245	39,749	75.8%
Wisconsin	Camp Randall Stadium	80,321	75,324	77,542	**80,584**	78,580	78,058	**80,462**	**81,216**†	–	551,766	78,824	98.1%

Bold – Exceed capacity
†Season High

== NFL draft ==
Team	Round 1	Round 2	Round 3	Round 4	Round 5	Round 6	Round 7	Total
Illinois	–	–	–	–	–	–	–	0
Indiana	–	–	–	1	–	1	–	2
Iowa	–	2	–	1	–	–	–	3
Maryland	1	–	–	–	1	–	–	2
Michigan	–	–	1	–	1	–	–	2
Michigan State	–	–	–	1	–	–	–	1
Minnesota	–	–	–	–	–	–	–	0
Nebraska	–	–	–	–	–	1	–	1
Northwestern	–	–	–	–	–	–	1	1
Ohio State	2	1	2	1	1	–	–	7
Penn State	1	1	–	2	1	1	–	6
Purdue	–	–	–	–	1	–	–	1
Rutgers	–	1	–	–	–	1	–	2
Wisconsin	–	–	–	1	2	1	1	5

*	= Compensatory Selections

Rnd.	Pick	Team	Player	Pos.	College	Notes
1	2	New York Giants	Saquon Barkley	RB	Penn State	
1	4	Cleveland Browns	Denzel Ward	CB	Ohio State	from Houston (Note: No. 4: Houston → Cleveland (PD). Houston traded their first-round selection (4th) and their first-round selection in 2017 (25th) to Cleveland in exchange for Cleveland's first-round selection in 2017 (12th).With the trade, Houston selected Deshaun Watson.)
1	21	Cincinnati Bengals	Billy Price	C	Ohio State	from Buffalo via Cincinnati (Note: No. 12: Cincinnati → Buffalo (PD). Cincinnati traded their first- and sixth-round selections (12th and 187th) to Buffalo in exchange for Buffalo's first- and fifth-round selection (21st and 158th) and offensive tackle Cordy Glenn.)
1	24	Carolina Panthers	D. J. Moore	WR	Maryland	
2	39	Chicago Bears	James Daniels	C	Iowa	
2	42	Miami Dolphins	Mike Gesicki	TE	Penn State	
2	45	Green Bay Packers	Josh Jackson	CB	Iowa	
2	52	Indianapolis Colts	Kemoko Turay	DE	Rutgers	from Baltimore via Philadelphia (Note: No. 52: multiple trades: No. 52: Baltimore → Philadelphia (D). see No. 32: Philadelphia → Baltimore. No. 52: Philadelphia → Indianapolis (D). see No. 49: Indianapolis → Philadelphia.)
2	64	Indianapolis Colts	Tyquan Lewis	DE	Ohio State	from Philadelphia via Cleveland (Note: No. 64: multiple trades: No. 64: Philadelphia → Cleveland (PD). Philadelphia traded their second-round selection (64th) as well as a first-, third-, and fourth-round selections in 2016 (8th, 77th, and 100th) and their first-round selection in 2017 to Cleveland in exchange for Cleveland's first-round selection in 2016 (2nd) and a fourth-round selection in 2017. No. 64: Cleveland → Indianapolis (D). Cleveland traded their second-round selection (64th) to Indianapolis in exchange for Indianapolis' third- and sixth-round selection (67th and 178th).)
3	73	Miami Dolphins	Jerome Baker	LB	Ohio State	
3	77	Cincinnati Bengals	Sam Hubbard	DE	Ohio State	
3*	97	Arizona Cardinals	Mason Cole	C	Michigan	
4	101	Carolina Panthers	Ian Thomas	TE	Indiana	from Cleveland via Green Bay (Note: No. 101: multiple trades: No. 101: Cleveland → Green Bay (PD). Cleveland traded their fourth- and fifth-round selections (101st and 138th), and quarterback DeShone Kizer to Green Bay in exchange for Green Bay's fourth- and fifth-round selections (114th and 150th), and cornerback Damarious Randall. No. 101: Green Bay → Carolina (D). see No. 88: Carolina → Green Bay.)
4	102	Minnesota Vikings	Jalyn Holmes	DE	Ohio State	from NY Giants via Tampa Bay (Note: No. 102: multiple trades: No. 102: NY Giants → Tampa Bay (PD). see No. 69: Tampa Bay → NY Giants. No. 102: Tampa Bay → Minnesota (D). see No. 94: Minnesota → Tampa Bay.)
4	106	Denver Broncos	Josey Jewell	LB	Iowa	
4	109	Washington Redskins	Troy Apke	S	Penn State	from San Francisco via Denver (Note: No. 109: multiple trades: No. 109: San Francisco → Denver (PD). San Francisco traded their fourth-round selection (109th) to Denver in exchange for running back Kapri Bibbs and their fifth-round selection in 2017 (177th). No. 109: Denver → Washington (PD). Denver traded a fourth- and two fifth-round selections (109th, 142nd, and 163rd) to Washington in exchange for Washington's fourth- and fifth-round selections (113th and 149th) and safety Su'a Cravens. Washington will also receive Denver's sixth-round selection in 2020 if Cravens appears in a playoff game with the Broncos.)
4	110	Oakland Raiders	Nick Nelson	CB	Wisconsin	
4	111	Los Angeles Rams	Brian Allen	C	Michigan State	From Miami (Note: No. 111: Miami → LA Rams (PD). The Dolphins traded their fourth- and sixth-round selections (111th and 183rd) to New England in exchange for Robert Quinn.)
4	113	Denver Broncos	DaeSean Hamilton	WR	Penn State	from Washington (Note: No. 113: Washington → Denver (PD). see No. 109: Denver → Washington.)
5	140	Oakland Raiders	Maurice Hurst Jr.	DT	Michigan	from Indianapolis (Note: No. 140: Indianapolis → Oakland (D). Indianapolis traded their fifth-round selection (140th) to Oakland in exchange for the Oakland's fifth- and sixth-round selections (159th and 185th).)
5	143	New England Patriots	Ja'Whaun Bentley	LB	Purdue	from San Francisco via NY Jets (Note: No. 143: New York Jets → San Francisco (PD). The Jets traded their fifth-round selection (143rd) to San Francisco in exchange for cornerback Rashard Robinson.)
5	148	Pittsburgh Steelers	Marcus Allen	S	Penn State	from San Francisco (Note: No. 148: San Francisco → Pittsburgh (PD). see No. 128: Pittsburgh → San Francisco.)
5	161	Carolina Panthers	Jermaine Carter	LB	Maryland	
5	164	New Orleans Saints	Natrell Jamerson	S	Wisconsin	
5	168	Seattle Seahawks	Jamarco Jones	T	Ohio State	from New England (Note: No. 168: New England → Seattle (PD). New England traded their fifth- and seventh-round selections (168th and 250th) to Seattle in exchange for defensive end Cassius Marsh.)
6	182	Arizona Cardinals	Chris Campbell	CB	Penn State	from Denver (Note: No. 182: Denver → Arizona (PD). Denver traded their sixth-round selection (182nd) to Arizona in exchange for offensive tackle Jared Veldheer.)
6	193	Dallas Cowboys	Chris Covington	LB	Indiana	
6	195	Los Angeles Rams	Sebastian-Day Joseph	DT	Rutgers	from Buffalo (Note: No. 195: Buffalo → Los Angeles Rams (PD). see No. 56: Los Angeles Rams → Buffalo.)
6	202	Tampa Bay Buccaneers	Jack Cichy	LB	Wisconsin	from Pittsburgh via Cleveland and Pittsburgh (Note: No. 202: multiple trades: No. 202: Pittsburgh → Cleveland (PD). Pittsburgh traded their sixth-round selection (202nd) to Cleveland in exchange for cornerback Justin Gilbert. No. 202: Cleveland → Pittsburgh (PD). Cleveland traded this sixth-round selection back to Pittsburgh in exchange for wide receiver Sammie Coates and Pittsburgh's seventh-round selection in 2019. No. 202: Pittsburgh → Tampa Bay (PD). Pittsburgh then traded their sixth-round selection to Tampa Bay in exchange for free safety J. J. Wilcox and Tampa Bay's seventh-round selection in 2019.)
6	203	Jacksonville Jaguars	Tanner Lee	QB	Nebraska	
7	230	Jacksonville Jaguars	Leon Jacobs	LB	Wisconsin	from Cincinnati (Note: No. 230: Cincinnati → Jacksonville (PD). Cincinnati traded a conditional selection to Jacksonville in exchange for defensive end Chris Smith. The conditions were that the Jaguars would acquire the Bengals' seventh-round selection if Smith was on the Bengals' active roster for at least 6 games during the 2017 season, which he was.)
7*	251	Los Angeles Chargers	Justin Jackson	RB	Northwestern	

Trades In the explanations below, (PD) indicates trades completed prior to the start of the draft (i.e. Pre-Draft), while (D) denotes trades that took place during the 2018 draft.

Round one

Round two

Round three

Round four

Round five

Round six

Round seven

== Head coaches ==
Note: All stats current through January 1, 2018

Team	Head coach	Years at school	Overall record	Record at school	B1G record
Illinois	Lovie Smith	2	5–19 (.208)	5–19 (.208)	2–16 (.111)
Indiana	Tom Allen*	1	5–8 (.385)	5–8 (.385)	2–7 (.222)
Iowa	Kirk Ferentz	19	155–97 (.615)	143–97 (.596)	86–68 (.558)
Maryland	D. J. Durkin	2	10–15 (.400)	10–15 (.400)	5–13 (.278)
Michigan	Jim Harbaugh	3	86–38 (.694)	28–11 (.718)	18–8 (.692)
Michigan State	Mark Dantonio	11	118–62 (.656)	100–45 (.690)	61–29 (.678)
Minnesota	P. J. Fleck	1	35–29 (.547)	5–7 (.417)	2–7 (.222)
Nebraska	Mike Riley*	3	112–99 (.531)	19–19 (.500)	12–14 (.462)
Northwestern	Pat Fitzgerald	12	87–64 (.576)	87–64 (.576)	48–49 (.495)
Ohio State	Urban Meyer	6	177–31 (.851)	73–8 (.901)	47–3 (.940)
Penn State	James Franklin	4	60–32 (.652)	36–17 (.679)	21–13 (.618)
Purdue	Jeff Brohm	1	37–16 (.698)	7–6 (.538)	4–5 (.444)
Rutgers	Chris Ash	2	6–18 (.250)	6–18 (.250)	3–15 (.167)
Wisconsin	Paul Chryst	3	53–26 (.671)	34–7 (.829)	22–4 (.846)

* Tom Allen was hired to replace Kevin Wilson in December 2016 at Indiana and coached the Hoosiers in their 2016 bowl game.

* Mike Riley was fired on November 25, 2017, following the conclusion of Nebraska's season.
