= 2017 Minnesota Golden Gophers football team =

American college football season

2017 Minnesota Golden Gophers football
- Conference: Big Ten Conference
- West Division
- Record: 5–7 (2–7 Big Ten)
- Head coach: P. J. Fleck (1st season)
- Offensive coordinator: Kirk Ciarrocca (1st season)
- Offensive scheme: Spread
- Defensive coordinator: Robb Smith (1st season)
- Base defense: 4–3
- Home stadium: TCF Bank Stadium

2017 Big Ten Conference football standings
	Conf.			Overall
Team	W		L	W		L
East Division
No. 5 Ohio State xy$	8	–	1	12	–	2
No. 15 Michigan State	7	–	2	10	–	3
No. 8 Penn State	7	–	2	11	–	2
Michigan	5	–	4	8	–	5
Rutgers	3	–	6	4	–	8
Indiana	2	–	7	5	–	7
Maryland	2	–	7	4	–	8
West Division
No. 7 Wisconsin xy	9	–	0	13	–	1
No. 17 Northwestern	7	–	2	10	–	3
Iowa	4	–	5	8	–	5
Purdue	4	–	5	7	–	6
Nebraska	3	–	6	4	–	8
Minnesota	2	–	7	5	–	7
Illinois	0	–	9	2	–	10
Championship: Ohio State 27, Wisconsin 21
$ – Conference champion; x – Division champion/co-champions; y – Championship game participant; Rankings from AP Poll

The 2017 Minnesota Golden Gophers football team represented the University of Minnesota during the 2017 NCAA Division I FBS football season. The Gophers were led by first-year head coach P. J. Fleck and played their home games at TCF Bank Stadium in Minneapolis, Minnesota. Minnesota competed as a member of the West Division of the Big Ten Conference. They finished the season 5–7, 2–7 in Big Ten play to finish in sixth place in the West Division.

== Recruiting ==
=== Position key ===
Back	B	Center	C	Cornerback	CB	Defensive back	DB
Defensive end	DE	Defensive lineman	DL	Defensive tackle	DT	End	E
Fullback	FB	Guard	G	Halfback	HB	Kicker	K
Kickoff returner	KR	Offensive tackle	OT	Offensive lineman	OL	Linebacker	LB
Long snapper	LS	Punter	P	Punt returner	PR	Quarterback	QB
Running back	RB	Safety	S	Tight end	TE	Wide receiver	WR

=== Recruits ===
The Gophers signed a total of 26 recruits.

College recruiting information (2017)
Name	Hometown	School	Height	Weight	Commit date
Blaise Andries; OT	Marshall, Minnesota	Marshall HS	6 ft 5 in (1.96 m)	280 lb (130 kg)	Apr 9, 2016
Blaise Andries; OT	Recruit ratings: Scout: Rivals: 247Sports: ESPN:				
Eric Abojei; OT	Minneapolis, Minnesota	Robbinsdale Cooper HS	6 ft 4 in (1.93 m)	210 lb (95 kg)	Apr 17, 2016
Eric Abojei; OT	Recruit ratings: Scout: Rivals: 247Sports: ESPN:				
Grant Ryerse; K	Woodbury, Minnesota	East Ridge HS	6 ft 4 in (1.93 m)	220 lb (100 kg)	Jun 8, 2016
Grant Ryerse; K	Recruit ratings: Scout: Rivals: 247Sports: ESPN:				
Dominik London; RB	Woodbury, Minnesota	East Ridge HS	5 ft 8 in (1.73 m)	196 lb (89 kg)	Jun 15, 2016
Dominik London; RB	Recruit ratings: Scout: Rivals: 247Sports: ESPN:				
Nathan Bursch; TE	Woodbury, Minnesota	Woodbury HS	6 ft 5 in (1.96 m)	235 lb (107 kg)	Jun 20, 2016
Nathan Bursch; TE	Recruit ratings: Scout: Rivals: 247Sports: ESPN:				
Neil McLaurin; QB	Laurel, Mississippi	West Jones HS/Southwest Mississippi Community College	6 ft 3 in (1.91 m)	200 lb (91 kg)	Dec 11, 2016
Neil McLaurin; QB	Recruit ratings: Scout: Rivals: 247Sports: ESPN:				
Tanner Morgan; QB	Union, Kentucky	Ryle HS	6 ft 1 in (1.85 m)	203 lb (92 kg)	Jan 6, 2017
Tanner Morgan; QB	Recruit ratings: Scout: Rivals: 247Sports: ESPN:				
Esezi Otomewo; DE	Indianapolis, Indiana	Ben Davis HS	6 ft 6 in (1.98 m)	210 lb (95 kg)	Jan 6, 2017
Esezi Otomewo; DE	Recruit ratings: Scout: Rivals: 247Sports: ESPN:				
Trenton Guthrie; LB	Pinckney, Michigan	Northville HS	6 ft 2 in (1.88 m)	204 lb (93 kg)	Jan 6, 2017
Trenton Guthrie; LB	Recruit ratings: Scout: Rivals: 247Sports: ESPN:				
John Schmitz; OG	Flossmoor, Illinois	Homewood-Flossmoor HS	6 ft 4 in (1.93 m)	285 lb (129 kg)	Jan 6, 2017
John Schmitz; OG	Recruit ratings: Scout: Rivals: 247Sports: ESPN:				
Noah Hickcox; DE	Rockford, Illinois	Boylan Catholic HS	6 ft 4 in (1.93 m)	279 lb (127 kg)	Jan 6, 2017
Noah Hickcox; DE	Recruit ratings: Scout: Rivals: 247Sports: ESPN:				
Chris Autman-Bell; WR	Kankakee, Illinois	Bishop McNamara HS	6 ft 1 in (1.85 m)	178 lb (81 kg)	Jan 6, 2017
Chris Autman-Bell; WR	Recruit ratings: Scout: Rivals: 247Sports: ESPN:				
Mohamed Ibrahim; RB	Olney, Maryland	Good Counsel HS	5 ft 9 in (1.75 m)	178 lb (81 kg)	Jan 8, 2017
Mohamed Ibrahim; RB	Recruit ratings: Scout: Rivals: 247Sports: ESPN:				
Kyle Sassack; OT	Pontiac, Michigan	Notre Dame Prep	6 ft 7 in (2.01 m)	270 lb (120 kg)	Jan 8, 2017
Kyle Sassack; OT	Recruit ratings: Scout: Rivals: 247Sports: ESPN:				
Nate Ulmor; TE	Allendale, Michigan	Allendale HS	6 ft 6 in (1.98 m)	270 lb (120 kg)	Jan 8, 2017
Nate Ulmor; TE	Recruit ratings: Scout: Rivals: 247Sports: ESPN:				
Jacob Paulson; TE	Louisville, Kentucky	Christian Academy of Louisville	6 ft 5 in (1.96 m)	245 lb (111 kg)	Jan 11, 2017
Jacob Paulson; TE	Recruit ratings: Scout: Rivals: 247Sports: ESPN:				
Demetrius Douglas; CB	Portland, Oregon	Jesuit HS	6 ft 0 in (1.83 m)	173 lb (78 kg)	Jan 14, 2017
Demetrius Douglas; CB	Recruit ratings: Scout: Rivals: 247Sports: ESPN:				
Harrison Van Dyke; WR	Stilwell, Kansas	Blue Valley HS	6 ft 5 in (1.96 m)	185 lb (84 kg)	Jan 15, 2017
Harrison Van Dyke; WR	Recruit ratings: Scout: Rivals: 247Sports: ESPN:				
Reyondous Estes; QB	East Saint Louis, Illinois	East St. Louis HS	6 ft 0 in (1.83 m)	164 lb (74 kg)	Jan 18, 2017
Reyondous Estes; QB	Recruit ratings: Scout: Rivals: 247Sports: ESPN:				
Kendarian Handy-Holly; S	Jackson, Alabama	Jackson HS	6 ft 2 in (1.88 m)	192 lb (87 kg)	Jan 21, 2017
Kendarian Handy-Holly; S	Recruit ratings: Scout: Rivals: 247Sports: ESPN:				
Adam Beck; CB	Richmond, Texas	George Ranch HS	6 ft 2 in (1.88 m)	185 lb (84 kg)	Jan 22, 2017
Adam Beck; CB	Recruit ratings: Scout: Rivals: 247Sports: ESPN:				
Austin Schirck; DT	Carroll, Iowa	Carroll HS	6 ft 5 in (1.96 m)	265 lb (120 kg)	Jan 29, 2017
Austin Schirck; DT	Recruit ratings: Scout: Rivals: 247Sports: ESPN:				
Justus Harris; CB	Roswell, Georgia	Roswell HS	5 ft 10 in (1.78 m)	170 lb (77 kg)	Jan 29, 2017
Justus Harris; CB	Recruit ratings: Scout: Rivals: 247Sports: ESPN:				
Royal Silver; DT	Cedar Rapids, Iowa	Iowa Western Community College	6 ft 4 in (1.93 m)	290 lb (130 kg)	Jan 29, 2017
Royal Silver; DT	Recruit ratings: Scout: Rivals: 247Sports: ESPN:				
Malcolm Robinson; DT	Massillon, Ohio	Massillon Washington HS	6 ft 3 in (1.91 m)	280 lb (130 kg)	Jan 30, 2017
Malcolm Robinson; DT	Recruit ratings: Scout: Rivals: 247Sports: ESPN:				
Boye Mafe; DE	Minnetonka, Minnesota	Hopkins HS	6 ft 4 in (1.93 m)	225 lb (102 kg)	Feb 1, 2017
Boye Mafe; DE	Recruit ratings: Scout: Rivals: 247Sports: ESPN:				
Overall recruit ranking:
Note: In many cases, Scout, Rivals, 247Sports, On3, and ESPN may conflict in their listings of height and weight.; In these cases, the average was taken. ESPN grades are on a 100-point scale.; Sources: "Minnesota Football Commitments". Rivals.; "2017 Minnesota Football Commits". Scout.; "ESPN". ESPN.; "Scout.com Team Recruiting Rankings". Scout.; "2017 Team Ranking". Rivals.com.

== Schedule ==
The Gophers' 2017 schedule consisted of 7 home games and 5 away games. Minnesota hosted two of its non-conference games; against Buffalo from the MAC and against Middle Tennessee from Conference USA; the Gophers played on the road against Oregon State from the Pac-12.

The Gophers played nine conference games; they hosted Maryland, Michigan State, Illinois, Nebraska, and Wisconsin. They traveled to Purdue, Iowa, and Michigan, and Northwestern.

Date	Time	Opponent	Site	TV	Result	Attendance
August 31	6:00 p.m.	Buffalo*	TCF Bank Stadium; Minneapolis, MN	BTN	W 17–7	43,224
September 9	9:00 p.m.	at Oregon State*	Reser Stadium; Corvallis, OR	FS1	W 48–14	35,206
September 16	2:30 p.m.	Middle Tennessee*	TCF Bank Stadium; Minneapolis, MN	BTN	W 34–3	43,727
September 30	11:00 a.m.	Maryland	TCF Bank Stadium; Minneapolis, MN	FS1	L 24–31	43,511
October 7	2:30 p.m.	at Purdue	Ross–Ade Stadium; West Lafayette, IN	ESPN2	L 17–31	42,085
October 14	7:00 p.m.	No. 21 Michigan State	TCF Bank Stadium; Minneapolis, MN	BTN	L 27–30	47,541
October 21	2:30 p.m.	Illinois^{†}	TCF Bank Stadium; Minneapolis, MN	BTN	W 24–17	45,243
October 28	5:30 p.m.	at Iowa	Kinnick Stadium; Iowa City, IA (rivalry)	FS1	L 10–17	66,292
November 4	6:30 p.m.	at Michigan	Michigan Stadium; Ann Arbor, MI (Little Brown Jug)	FOX	L 10–33	111,090
November 11	11:00 a.m.	Nebraska	TCF Bank Stadium; Minneapolis, MN (rivalry)	FS1	W 54–21	39,933
November 18	11:00 a.m.	at Northwestern	Ryan Field; Evanston, IL	BTN	L 0–39	30,014
November 25	2:30 p.m.	No. 5 Wisconsin	TCF Bank Stadium; Minneapolis, MN (rivalry)	ABC	L 0–31	47,327
*Non-conference game; ^{†}Homecoming; Rankings from AP Poll released prior to the game; All times are in Central time

== Game summaries ==
=== Buffalo ===
	1	2	3	4	Total
Bulls	7	0	0	0	7
Golden Gophers	14	0	0	3	17

=== At Oregon State ===
	1	2	3	4	Total
Golden Gophers	10	10	14	14	48
Beavers	0	14	0	0	14

=== Middle Tennessee ===
	1	2	3	4	Total
Blue Raiders	0	3	0	0	3
Golden Gophers	3	17	7	7	34

=== Maryland ===
	1	2	3	4	Total
Terrapins	7	10	0	14	31
Golden Gophers	0	10	7	7	24

=== At Purdue ===
	1	2	3	4	Total
Golden Gophers	7	7	0	3	17
Boilermakers	6	0	7	18	31

=== Michigan State ===
	1	2	3	4	Total
No. 21 Spartans	10	7	6	7	30
Golden Gophers	6	0	0	21	27

=== Illinois ===
	1	2	3	4	Total
Fighting Illini	7	0	0	10	17
Golden Gophers	7	0	3	14	24

=== At Iowa ===
	1	2	3	4	Total
Golden Gophers	0	0	0	10	10
Hawkeyes	7	0	7	3	17

=== At Michigan ===
	1	2	3	4	Total
Golden Gophers	7	0	0	3	10
Wolverines	13	7	13	0	33

=== Nebraska ===
	1	2	3	4	Total
Cornhuskers	7	7	0	7	21
Golden Gophers	14	16	10	14	54

=== At Northwestern ===
	1	2	3	4	Total
Golden Gophers	0	0	0	0	0
Wildcats	0	25	7	7	39

=== Wisconsin ===
	1	2	3	4	Total
No. 5 Badgers	7	10	7	7	31
Golden Gophers	0	0	0	0	0

== Roster ==
2017 Minnesota Golden Gophers football team roster
Players
Coaches
Offense

Pos.	#	Name	Class
RB	1	Rodney Smith	Jr
WR	2	Isaiah Gentry-Madaris	Jr
WR	3	Chris Autman-Bell	Fr
WR	5	Melvin Holland Jr.	Jr
WR	6	Tyler Johnson	So
WR	8	Mark Williams	Fr
WR	9	Eric Carter	Sr
QB	11	Demry Croft	So
WR	12	Hunter Register	So
QB	13	Tanner Morgan	Fr
QB	14	Jaran Roste	Fr
QB	15	Conor Rhoda	Sr
QB	16	Ray Estes	Fr
QB	17	Seth Green	Fr
WR	19	Clay Geary	Fr
QB	19	Samuel Pickerign	Fr
RB	22	Kobe McCrary	Sr
RB	23	Shannon Brooks	Jr
WR	24	Drew Hmielewski	Fr
WR	25	Phillip Howard	Fr
RB	28	Jonathan Femi-Cole	So
RB	30	Mohamed Ibrahim	Fr
RB	31	Domink London	Fr
RB	32	Zachariah Knox	So
RB	33	Mike Delich	Fr
TE	40	Nathan Bursch	Fr
TE	42	Ko Kieft	Fr
TE	44	Colton Beebe	So
TE	49	Jake Paulson	Fr
OL	53	Vincent Magaña	Jr
OL	55	Eric Rousemiller	Fr
OL	58	Quinn Oseland	So
OL	60	John Michael Schmitz	Fr
OL	61	Bronson Dovich	So
OL	62	Jared Weyler	Jr
OL	64	Conner Olson	Fr
OL	65	Axel Ruschmeyer	Fr
OL	70	Sam Schlueter	Fr
OL	71	Ben Davis	So
OL	73	Donnell Greene	Jr
OL	74	Nick Connelly	So
OL	75	Noah Kuehn	So
OL	75	Kyle Sassack	Fr
OL	76	Vincent Calhoun	Sr
OL	77	Blaise Andries	Fr
OL	78	Garrison Wright	Sr
TE	80	Nate Wozniak	Sr
WR	81	Brock Annexstad	Fr
WR	82	Demetrius Douglas	Fr
WR	83	Harry Van Dyne	Fr
WR	84	Will Reger	Jr
TE	85	Bryce Witham	So
TE	86	Brandon Lingen	Sr
WR	87	Reid Hilbelink	Fr
WR	88	Rashad Still	Jr
WR	89	Matt Morse	So
TE	89	Nate Umlor	Fr
TE	98	Clayton Witherspoon	Fr

Defense

Pos.	#	Name	Class
DB	2	Jacob Huff	Jr
DL	3	Jerry Gibson	Jr
DB	4	Adekunle Ayinde	Sr
LB	5	Trenton Guthrie	Fr
DB	6	Chris Williamson	Jr
DB	7	Ken Handy-Holly	Fr
DB	8	Duke McGhee	Sr
DB	11	Antoine Winfield Jr.	So
LB	12	Cody Poock	Sr
LB	13	Jonathan Celestin	Sr
DB	14	Zo Craighton	So
LB	15	Everett Williams	Jr
DB	16	Coney Durr	So
DL	19	Gary Moore	Jr
LB	20	Julian Huff	Jr
LB	21	Kamal Martin	So
DB	22	Dorborwulu Cooper	Jr
DB	23	Adam Beck	Fr
DB	26	Justus Harris	Fr
DB	27	Calvin Swenson	Fr
DB	29	Jack Leius	So
DB	26	Johnny Santaga	Fr
DB	31	Kiondre Thomas	Fr
DB	32	Brady Wieland	Fr
DB	34	Antonio Shenault	Jr
LB	35	Jaylen Waters	So
LB	36	Blake Cashman	Jr
DB	40	Alex Strazzanti	Fr
LB	41	Thomas Barber	So
LB	43	Bailey Schoenfelder	Fr
LB	44	Tommy Fuller	Fr
LB	45	Carter Coughlin	So
DL	46	Winston DeLattiboudere	So
DB	50	Danny Anderson	Fr
DL	52	Austin Schirck	Fr
LB	57	Joe Russell	Fr
DL	59	Connor Novak-Goar	So
DL	69	Boye Mafe	Fr
DL	75	Malcolm Robinson	Fr
DL	90	Sam Renner	So
DL	91	Noah Hickcox	Fr
DL	92	Tai'yon Devers	So
DL	93	Merrick Jackson	Sr
DL	94	Quinn Coughlin	Fr
DL	95	Esezi Otomewo	Fr
DL	96	Steven Richardson	Sr
DL	97	Royal Silver	Jr
DL	98	O.J. Smith	Jr
DL	99	Andrew Stelter	Sr

Special teams

Pos.	#	Name	Class
P	18	Ryan Santoso	Sr
LS	25	Payton Jordahl	Jr
K, P	33	Grant Ryerse	Fr
P	34	Logan McElfresh	Jr
H	36	Casey O'Brien	Fr
K	37	John Mack	Fr
K	38	Emmit Carpenter	Jr
LS	39	Trey Hansen	So
K	42	Justin Juenemann	Sr
P	47	Jacob Herbers	So

Head coach

- P. J. Fleck (Head Coach)

Coordinators/assistant coaches

- Kirk Ciarrocca (Offensive Coordinator / Quarterbacks)
- Robb Smith (Defensive Coordinator / Linebackers)
- Kenni Burns (Running Backs)
- Brian Callahan (Tight Ends)
- Maurice Linguist (Defensive Backs)
- Bryce Paup (Defensive Line)
- Matt Simon (Wide Receivers)
- Ed Warinner (Offensive Line / Run Game Coordinator)
- Rob Wenger (Special Teams Coordinator)
- Gerrit Chernoff (General Manager)
- Dan Nichol (Head Strength & Conditioning)

Legend

- (C) Team captain
- (S) Suspended
- (I) Ineligible
- Injured
- Redshirt

Roster
Last update: September 5, 2017
