= Beau Benzschawel =

American football player (born 1995)

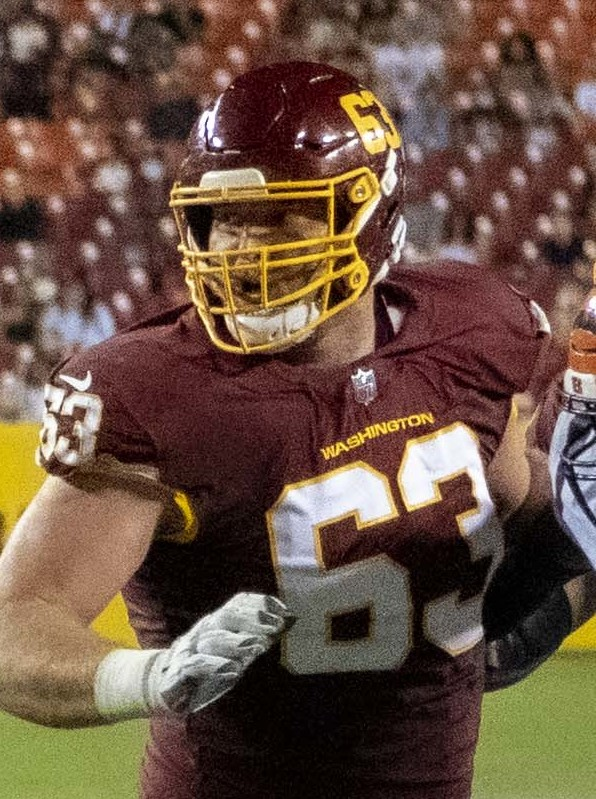
- Benzschawel with Washington in 2021

No. 63, 62
- Position: Guard

Personal information
- Born: September 10, 1995 (age 31); Milwaukee, Wisconsin, U.S.
- Listed height: 6 ft 6 in (1.98 m)
- Listed weight: 300 lb (136 kg)

Career information
- High school: Grafton (Grafton, Wisconsin)
- College: Wisconsin (2014–2018)
- NFL draft: 2019: undrafted

Career history
- Detroit Lions (2019–2020); Houston Texans (2020); Washington Football Team (2021–2022)*; Jacksonville Jaguars (2022)*; Tennessee Titans (2022)*
- * Offseason or practice squad member only

Awards and highlights
- 2× All-American (2017, 2018); 2× first-team All-Big Ten (2017, 2018); Second-team All-Big Ten (2016)

Career NFL statistics
- Games played: 3
- Stats at Pro Football Reference

Beau Benzschawel (born September 10, 1995) is an American former professional football player who was a guard in the National Football League (NFL). He played college football for the Wisconsin Badgers and signed with the Detroit Lions as an undrafted free agent in 2019. He has also played for the Houston Texans.

== Early life ==
Benzschawel played tight end and defensive end on the football team at Grafton High School. in addition, he played basketball and baseball.

After originally committing to Syracuse, Benzschawel committed to Wisconsin on October 24, 2013. He had other offers from Iowa State, Wyoming and Bowling Green, among others.

== College career ==
After redshirting the 2014 season, Benzschawel battled a knee injury before his redshirt freshman season.

During his sophomore season, Benzschawel started every game at offensive guard.

Preceding his junior season, Benzschawel was named a pre-season All American by USA Today. He injured his leg early in the season against Florida Atlantic. After being listed as questionable in the injury report for the following game, he wound up playing against BYU.

After the season, he was named a third-team All-American. He projected as a mid-round pick, with reports highlighting his awareness and long arms. Eventually, he decided not to enter the 2018 NFL draft after consulting with the NFL Draft Advisory Board.

In August 2018, Benzschawel was named a preseason second-team All-America by CBS Sports. He was also named a preseason first-team All-American by USA Today and the Associated Press. At the end of the season, Benzschawel was named a Consensus All-American.

== Professional career ==
Pre-draft measurables
Height	Weight	Arm length	Hand span	Wingspan	40-yard dash	10-yard split	20-yard split	20-yard shuttle	Three-cone drill	Vertical jump	Broad jump	Bench press
6 ft 6 1/4 in (1.99 m)	309 lb (140 kg)	33 3/8 in (0.85 m)	9 5/8 in (0.24 m)	6 ft 7 5/8 in (2.02 m)	5.24 s	1.85 s	3.05 s	4.74 s	7.48 s	26.5 in (0.67 m)	8 ft 2 in (2.49 m)	20 reps
All values from NFL Combine/Pro Day

=== Detroit Lions ===
After going undrafted in the 2019 NFL draft, Benzschawel was signed by the Detroit Lions. On September 5, 2020, Benzchawel was waived by the Lions and signed to the practice squad the next day. He was released from the practice squad on October 22, 2020. Benzschawel was re-signed to the practice squad on October 24. He was released on December 4, 2020.

=== Houston Texans ===
On December 9, 2020, Benzschawel was signed to the Houston Texans' practice squad. He was elevated to the active roster on January 2, 2021, for the team's week 17 game against the Tennessee Titans, and reverted to the practice squad after the game. He signed a reserve/future contract on January 4, 2021. He was waived on April 12, 2021.

=== Washington Football Team ===
Benzschawel was claimed off waivers by the Washington Football Team on April 13, 2021. He was released on August 31, 2021, but re-signed to the practice squad the following day. On January 10, 2022, Benzschawel signed a reserve/future contract after the 2021 regular season ended. He was released on July 30, 2022.

=== Jacksonville Jaguars ===
On August 3, 2022, Benzschawel signed with the Jacksonville Jaguars. He was waived on August 22, 2022.

=== Tennessee Titans ===
On December 20, 2022, Benzschawel signed with the practice squad of the Tennessee Titans, but was released three days later.

== Personal life ==
Benzschawel's brother Luke played tight end for the Badgers. The brothers' father also played at UW as a nose guard. Beau is an avid fisherman.
