= Leon Jacobs =

Nigerian-American football player (born 1995)

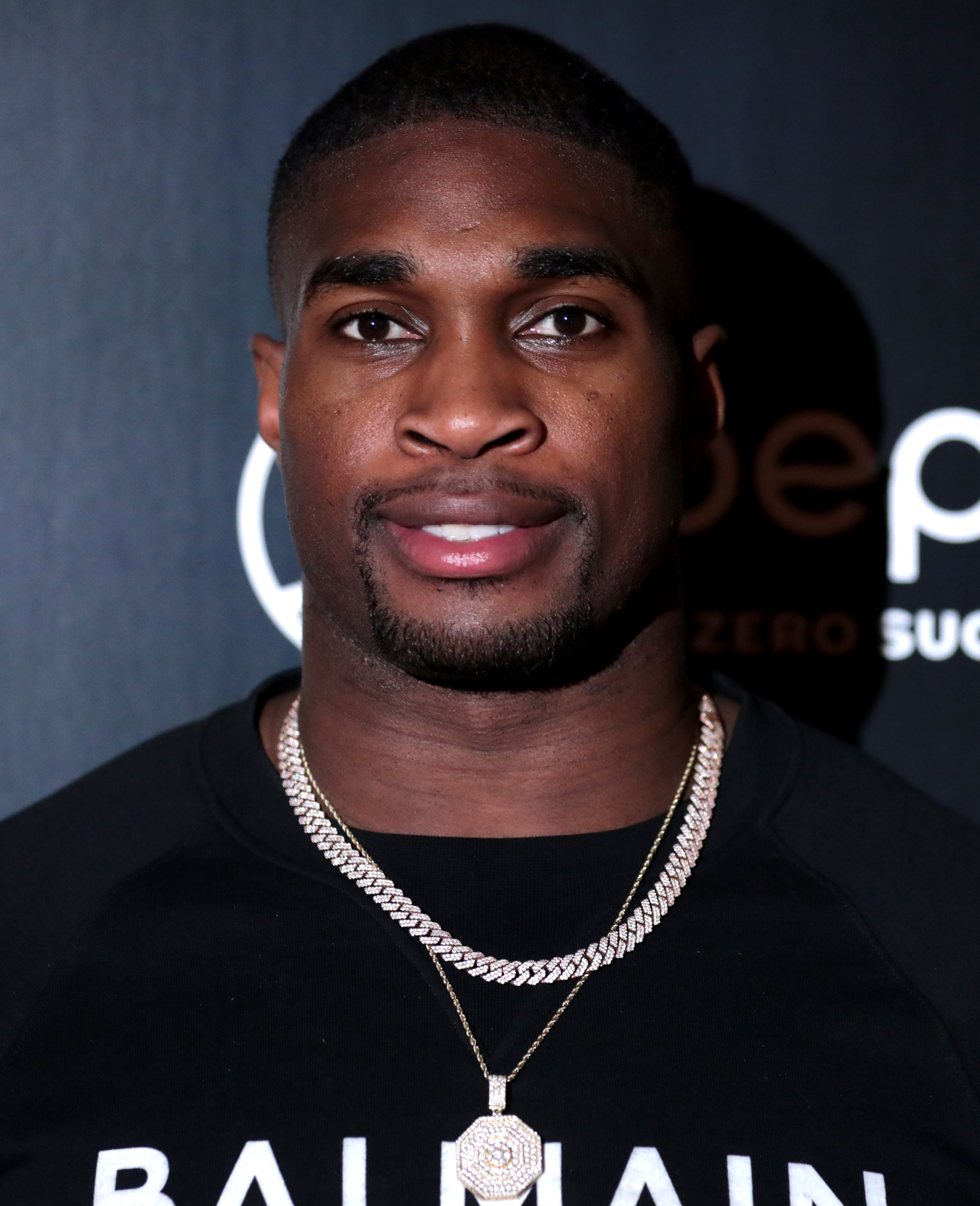
- Jacobs in 2023

No. 48
- Position: Linebacker

Personal information
- Born: October 3, 1995 (age 31); Enugu, Nigeria
- Listed height: 6 ft 2 in (1.88 m)
- Listed weight: 246 lb (112 kg)

Career information
- High school: Golden Valley (Santa Clarita, California, U.S.)
- College: Wisconsin
- NFL draft: 2018: 7th round, 230th overall pick

Career history
- Jacksonville Jaguars (2018–2020); Michigan Panthers (2023)

Career NFL statistics
- Total tackles: 66
- Sacks: 2
- Fumble recoveries: 1
- Pass deflections: 1
- Stats at Pro Football Reference

Leon Jacobs (born October 3, 1995) is a Nigerian-American former professional football linebacker. He played college football at Wisconsin. The San Pedro native holds the record for most games played by a Football Bowl Subdivision player having played in 59 NCAA contests.

== Early life ==
Jacobs was born in Nigeria, the oldest of four children of Theresa, a nurse, and Tony, an entrepreneur. He was given an Igbo name, Somgolie Nwude. His brother, Chibueze, played college basketball at Sacramento State. His family immigrated to California around the time that Jacobs began attending school.

Jacobs played football as a freshman at Bishop Montgomery High School before quitting to focus on basketball. He did not resume playing football until he was a senior at Golden Valley High School in Santa Clarita, California.

== College career ==
Jacobs attended and played college football at Wisconsin. In 2015, his season was ended by a foot injury after four games. He was granted a medical hardship waiver and extra year of eligibility. Until 2016 he had played exclusively at linebacker. He played both linebacker and fullback in 2016 and returned to just the defensive side of the ball in 2017 as the Badgers needed to replace linebackers T. J. Watt and Vince Biegel.

=== College statistics ===
Year	School	Conf	Class	Pos	G	Tackles					Interceptions					Fumbles			
Year	School	Conf	Class	Pos	G	Solo	Ast	Tot	Loss	Sk	Int	Yds	Avg	TD	PD	FR	Yds	TD	FF
2013	Wisconsin	Big Ten	FR	LB	13	4	3	7	1.0	0.0	0	0	0	0	0	0	0	0	0
2014	Wisconsin	Big Ten	SO	LB	14	18	10	28	2.0	1.5	0	0	0	0	0	0	0	0	0
2015	Wisconsin	Big Ten	JR	LB	4	5	5	10	2.0	0.5	0	0	0	0	0	0	0	0	0
2016	Wisconsin	Big Ten	JR	FB	14	24	13	37	1.0	1.0	1	25	25.0	0	0	0	0	0	0
2017	Wisconsin	Big Ten	SR	LB	14	35	25	60	9.5	3.5	2	5	2.5	0	3	2	0	1	1
Career	Wisconsin				59	86	56	142	15.5	6.5	3	30	10.0	0	3	2	0	1	1

== Professional career ==
Pre-draft measurables
Height	Weight	Arm length	Hand span	40-yard dash	10-yard split	20-yard split	20-yard shuttle	Three-cone drill	Vertical jump	Broad jump	Bench press
6 ft 1 1/8 in (1.86 m)	246 lb (112 kg)	33 1/2 in (0.85 m)	9 5/8 in (0.24 m)	4.48 s	1.58 s	2.61 s	4.44 s	7.14 s	34.5 in (0.88 m)	10 ft 2 in (3.10 m)	26 reps
All values from NFL Combine

=== Jacksonville Jaguars ===
Jacobs was drafted by the Jacksonville Jaguars in the seventh round (230th overall) of the 2018 NFL draft. He played in 12 games with three starts. In Week 14, against the Tennessee Titans, he scored a safety when tackled Cameron Batson in the endzone. He was placed on injured reserve on December 14, 2018, with a quad injury. Overall, he finished his rookie season with 21 combined tackles.

Jacobs entered the 2020 season as a starting linebacker for the Jaguars. In Week 3, he suffered a torn ACL and was placed on injured reserve on September 28, 2020.

On July 30, 2021, Jacobs was released by the Jaguars.

=== Michigan Panthers ===
On December 13, 2022, Jacobs signed with the Michigan Panthers of the United States Football League (USFL). He was transferred to the team's inactive list on March 20, 2023. He was not part of the roster after the 2024 UFL dispersal draft on January 15, 2024.
