= Robb Smith =

American football player and coach (born 1975)

Biographical details
- Born: May 10, 1975 (age 51); Pittsburgh, Pennsylvania, U.S.

Playing career
- 1993–1997: Allegheny
- Position: Strong safety

Coaching career (HC unless noted)
- 1999–2001: Iowa (GA/QC)
- 2002–2004: Maine (DB)
- 2005: Maine (ST/LB)
- 2006–2008: Maine (AHC/DC)
- 2009: Rutgers (ST/OLB)
- 2010: Rutgers (ST/CB)
- 2011: Rutgers (ST/LB)
- 2012: Rutgers (DC/DB)
- 2013: Tampa Bay Buccaneers (LB)
- 2014–2016: Arkansas (DC/DB)
- 2017–2018: Minnesota (DC/LB)
- 2019: Texas A&M (analyst)
- 2020–2021: Rutgers (DC)
- 2022: Duke (DC/LB)
- 2023–2024: Penn State (analyst)
- 2025: Rutgers (co-DC)

Robb Smith (born May 10, 1975) is an American football coach and former player. He is currently the co-defensive coordinator for Rutgers after being an analyst for the Penn State Nittany Lions. Previously, he was the defensive coordinator for Duke, Rutgers, Arkansas, and Minnesota. He was the linebackers coach for the Tampa Bay Buccaneers of the National Football League (NFL) under coach Greg Schiano during the 2013 season.

== Coaching career ==
=== Early coaching career ===
Before going to Rutgers and after being a graduate assistant at Iowa, Smith worked at the University of Maine from 2002 building himself up as a coach. He started as a defensive backs coach, in 2005 he was promoted to become the team's special teams and linebackers coach and in 2006 he was once again moved ahead given the position as the team's assistant head coach and defensive coordinator until 2008. Under Smith, Maine boasted one of the top defenses in the FCS, highlighted by the 2006 team that ranked first in rush defense, second in total defense, third in sacks, and fourth in scoring defense.

=== First stint at Rutgers ===
In 2009, Smith became the special teams coordinator and outside linebackers coach at Rutgers under Greg Schiano, a position he would hold for three years. During his tenure leading the special teams units, the Scarlet Knights' Special Teams ranked first nationally in blocked kicks with 31. The 2010 team led the nation in blocked punts followed by the 2011 team finishing 2nd in blocked punts. Throughout those seasons the Scarlet Knights Special Teams ranked fifth nationally in punt and kickoff returns for touchdowns.

Prior to the 2012 season Smith was promoted to defensive coordinator at Rutgers under new head coach Kyle Flood. The Rutgers defense was a historic one which helped lead the Scarlet Knights to their first conference championship in over fifty years. The Scarlet Knights defense ranked fourth in the nation in points allowed per game (14.2), sixth in rushing yards allowed per game (95.2), and tenth in total defense allowing 311 yards per game. Following the 2012 season, Smith went on to accept an opportunity to be the Linebackers Coach for the Tampa Bay Buccaneers joining coach Schiano.

=== Tampa Bay ===
During the 2013 season, Smith coached Lavonte David to first-team All-Pro. He started every game of the 2013 season and recorded 144 tackles. David became only the 3rd player in NFL History and the first linebacker to record 100 or more tackles, six or more sacks, and five or more interceptions in a single season.

=== Arkansas ===
Bret Bielema hired Smith prior to the 2014 season in Fayetteville to be the Arkansas Razorback's defensive coordinator and defensive backs coach. The Razorback defense found success finishing in the top ten in scoring defense (19.2) and total defense (323.4). The Razorbacks also went on to shutout back to back ranked opponents #17 LSU (17-0) and #8 Ole Miss (30-0) helping the Razorbacks reach their first bowl game since 2011. The Razorback defense continued to have success stopping the run in 2015 holding Leonard Fournette to 91 yards rushing and Derrick Henry to 95 yards rushing. His defense finished the season ranked 12th nationally and 2nd in the SEC in rushing defense (116.46).

=== Minnesota ===
Smith was hired by P. J. Fleck (whom he coached with at Rutgers and in Tampa) on his initial staff at Minnesota in January 2017 as the defensive coordinator and linebacker coach. The 2017 defense ranked 30th in total defense and 36th in scoring defense. But he was dismissed after only twenty-one games.

=== Return to Rutgers ===
On January 14, 2020, after a year working as a defensive analyst at Texas A&M, it was announced that Smith would return to Rutgers as the defensive coordinator under Coach Schiano.

=== Duke ===
On December 20, 2021, it was reported that Robb Smith would join new Duke head coach Mike Elko as defensive coordinator. Smith served as an Analyst at Texas A&M in 2019 when Elko was the defensive coordinator. During his one season at Duke, Smith's defense held opponents to 22.1 points per game. Before Smith's arrival, the Duke defense gave up 39.8 points per game. The 2022 Duke defense had a turnover margin of +16 which ranked 2nd nationally. The Blue Devils finished the season with a 9-4 record and won the Military bowl vs. UCF 30-13. Following the season, Smith decided to step down to spend more time with his family who reside in Minnesota.

=== Penn State ===
Smith served as an Analyst in 2023 and helped the Nittany Lions earn a berth in the Peach Bowl. Smith helped call the defense in the Peach Bowl after Manny Diaz took the head coaching position at Duke. Smith was initially elevated on the field on the offensive side of the ball when James Franklin relieved Mike Yurcich following the loss to Michigan. Following Diaz's departure, Smith was elevated to Co-Defensive Coordinator for the Peach Bowl.

== Personal life ==
A 1997 graduate of Allegheny (Pa.) College with a bachelor's degree in economics, Smith was a three-year letterwinner at strong safety. He began his coaching career as a graduate assistant with Iowa from 1999 to 2001, where he earned his master's degree in communications studies in 2002. Smith and his wife Amy have two children, Charlie and Jack.
