= 2017 Illinois Fighting Illini football team =

American college football season

2017 Illinois Fighting Illini football
- Conference: Big Ten Conference
- West Division
- Record: 2–10 (0–9 Big Ten)
- Head coach: Lovie Smith (2nd season)
- Offensive coordinator: Garrick McGee (2nd season)
- Offensive scheme: Multiple
- Defensive coordinator: Hardy Nickerson (2nd season)
- Base defense: 4–3
- Home stadium: Memorial Stadium

2017 Big Ten Conference football standings
	Conf.			Overall
Team	W		L	W		L
East Division
No. 5 Ohio State xy$	8	–	1	12	–	2
No. 15 Michigan State	7	–	2	10	–	3
No. 8 Penn State	7	–	2	11	–	2
Michigan	5	–	4	8	–	5
Rutgers	3	–	6	4	–	8
Indiana	2	–	7	5	–	7
Maryland	2	–	7	4	–	8
West Division
No. 7 Wisconsin xy	9	–	0	13	–	1
No. 17 Northwestern	7	–	2	10	–	3
Iowa	4	–	5	8	–	5
Purdue	4	–	5	7	–	6
Nebraska	3	–	6	4	–	8
Minnesota	2	–	7	5	–	7
Illinois	0	–	9	2	–	10
Championship: Ohio State 27, Wisconsin 21
$ – Conference champion; x – Division champion/co-champions; y – Championship game participant; Rankings from AP Poll

The 2017 Illinois Fighting Illini football team was an American football team that represented the University of Illinois Urbana-Champaign as a member of the Big Ten Conference during the 2017 NCAA Division I FBS football season. In their second season under head coach Lovie Smith, the Fighting Illini compiled a 2–10 record (0–9 in conference games), finished in last place in the Big Ten's West Division, and were outscored by a total of 378 to 185.

The team's statistical leaders included quarterback Jeff George Jr. (1,273 passing yards), running back Mike Epstein (346 rushing yards), wide receiver Ricky Smalling (31 receptions for 510 yards), and kicker Chase McLaughlin (53 points scored, 17 of 17 extra points, 12 of 17 field goals).

The team played its home games at Memorial Stadium in Champaign, Illinois.

== Recruiting ==
=== Position key ===
Back	B	Center	C	Cornerback	CB	Defensive back	DB
Defensive end	DE	Defensive lineman	DL	Defensive tackle	DT	End	E
Fullback	FB	Guard	G	Halfback	HB	Kicker	K
Kickoff returner	KR	Offensive tackle	OT	Offensive lineman	OL	Linebacker	LB
Long snapper	LS	Punter	P	Punt returner	PR	Quarterback	QB
Running back	RB	Safety	S	Tight end	TE	Wide receiver	WR

=== Recruits ===
The Fighting Illini signed a total of 25 recruits.

College recruiting (2017)
Name	Hometown	School	Height	Weight	Commit date
Mike Epstein; RB	Fort Lauderdale, Florida	St. Thomas Aquinas HS	6 ft 0 in (1.83 m)	185 lb (84 kg)	Aug 6, 2015
Mike Epstein; RB	Recruit ratings: Scout: Rivals: 247Sports: ESPN:				
Ricky Smalling; WR	Chicago, Illinois	Brother Rice HS	6 ft 1 in (1.85 m)	189 lb (86 kg)	Apr 26, 2016
Ricky Smalling; WR	Recruit ratings: Scout: Rivals: 247Sports: ESPN:				
Kendall Smith; WR	Bolingbrook, Illinois	Bolingbrook HS	6 ft 2 in (1.88 m)	170 lb (77 kg)	Apr 26, 2016
Kendall Smith; WR	Recruit ratings: Scout: Rivals: 247Sports: ESPN:				
Cameron Thomas; QB	Richton Park, Illinois	Marian Catholic HS	6 ft 3 in (1.91 m)	180 lb (82 kg)	May 31, 2016
Cameron Thomas; QB	Recruit ratings: Scout: Rivals: 247Sports: ESPN:				
Vederian Lowe; OG	Rockford, Illinois	Auburn HS	6 ft 5 in (1.96 m)	352 lb (160 kg)	Jun 12, 2016
Vederian Lowe; OG	Recruit ratings: Scout: Rivals: 247Sports: ESPN:				
Marc Mondesir; LB	Chicago, Illinois	St. Rita HS	6 ft 2 in (1.88 m)	210 lb (95 kg)	Jun 12, 2016
Marc Mondesir; LB	Recruit ratings: Scout: Rivals: 247Sports: ESPN:				
Tony Adams; WR	St. Louis, Missouri	St. Louis University HS	6 ft 0 in (1.83 m)	185 lb (84 kg)	Aug 12, 2016
Tony Adams; WR	Recruit ratings: Scout: Rivals: 247Sports: ESPN:				
Larry Boyd; OG	St. Louis Missouri	Trinity Catholic HS	6 ft 5 in (1.96 m)	310 lb (140 kg)	Aug 13, 2016
Larry Boyd; OG	Recruit ratings: Scout: Rivals: 247Sports: ESPN:				
Carmoni Green; WR	Miami, Florida	Miami Central HS	6 ft 1 in (1.85 m)	192 lb (87 kg)	Aug 25, 2016
Carmoni Green; WR	Recruit ratings: Scout: Rivals: 247Sports: ESPN:				
Olalere Oladipo; DE	Huntley, Illinois	Huntley HS	6 ft 3 in (1.91 m)	238 lb (108 kg)	Aug 25, 2016
Olalere Oladipo; DE	Recruit ratings: Scout: Rivals: 247Sports: ESPN:				
Ra'Von Bonner; RB	Cincinnati, Ohio	Sycamore HS	6 ft 0 in (1.83 m)	210 lb (95 kg)	Sep 27, 2016
Ra'Von Bonner; RB	Recruit ratings: Scout: Rivals: 247Sports: ESPN:				
Del'Shawn Phillips; LB	Highland Park, Michigan	Garden City Community College	6 ft 1 in (1.85 m)	215 lb (98 kg)	Dec 14, 2016
Del'Shawn Phillips; LB	Recruit ratings: Scout: Rivals: 247Sports: ESPN:				
Howard Watkins; OG	Cincinnati, Ohio	Colerain HS	6 ft 5 in (1.96 m)	280 lb (130 kg)	Dec 19, 2016
Howard Watkins; OG	Recruit ratings: Scout: Rivals: 247Sports: ESPN:				
Kendrick Green; DT	Peoria, Illinois	Peoria HS	6 ft 4 in (1.93 m)	270 lb (120 kg)	Dec 22, 2016
Kendrick Green; DT	Recruit ratings: Scout: Rivals: 247Sports: ESPN:				
Nate Hobbs; CB	Louisville, Kentucky	Male HS	6 ft 0 in (1.83 m)	170 lb (77 kg)	Dec 23, 2016
Nate Hobbs; CB	Recruit ratings: Scout: Rivals: 247Sports: ESPN:				
Owen Carney; DE	Miami, Florida	Miami Central HS	6 ft 3 in (1.91 m)	232 lb (105 kg)	Dec 25, 2016
Owen Carney; DE	Recruit ratings: Scout: Rivals: 247Sports: ESPN:				
James Knight; S	East St. Louis, Illinois	East St. Louis HS	6 ft 0 in (1.83 m)	210 lb (95 kg)	Jan 16, 2017
James Knight; S	Recruit ratings: Scout: Rivals: 247Sports: ESPN:				
Louis Dorsey; TE	Jacksonville, Florida	Ribault HS	6 ft 6 in (1.98 m)	220 lb (100 kg)	Jan 21, 2017
Louis Dorsey; TE	Recruit ratings: Scout: Rivals: 247Sports: ESPN:				
Alex Palczewski; OT	Prospect, Illinois	Plant HS	6 ft 6 in (1.98 m)	260 lb (120 kg)	Jan 20, 2017
Alex Palczewski; OT	Recruit ratings: Scout: Rivals: 247Sports: ESPN:				
Deon Pate; DE	Jacksonville, Florida	Trinity Christian Academy	6 ft 3 in (1.91 m)	246 lb (112 kg)	Jan 30, 2017
Deon Pate; DE	Recruit ratings: Scout: Rivals: 247Sports: ESPN:				
Bennett Williams; CB	Watsonville, California	Saint Francis HS	5 ft 11 in (1.80 m)	192 lb (87 kg)	Jan 31, 2017
Bennett Williams; CB	Recruit ratings: Scout: Rivals: 247Sports: ESPN:				
Dawson DeGroot; S	Fort Myers, Florida	Fort Myers HS	6 ft 2 in (1.88 m)	190 lb (86 kg)	Jan 31, 2017
Dawson DeGroot; S	Recruit ratings: Scout: Rivals: 247Sports: ESPN:				
Jamal Woods; DE	Hueytown, Alabama	Hueytown HS	6 ft 3 in (1.91 m)	240 lb (110 kg)	Feb 1, 2017
Jamal Woods; DE	Recruit ratings: Scout: Rivals: 247Sports: ESPN:				
Bobby Roundtree; DE	Largo, Florida	Largo HS	6 ft 5 in (1.96 m)	230 lb (100 kg)	Feb 1, 2017
Bobby Roundtree; DE	Recruit ratings: Scout: Rivals: 247Sports: ESPN:				
Isaiah Gay; DE	Rocky Mount, North Carolina	Northern Nash HS	6 ft 3 in (1.91 m)	215 lb (98 kg)	Feb 10, 2017
Isaiah Gay; DE	Recruit ratings: Scout: Rivals: 247Sports: ESPN:				
Overall recruit ranking:
Note: In many cases, Scout, Rivals, 247Sports, On3, and ESPN may conflict in their listings of height and weight.; In these cases, the average was taken. ESPN grades are on a 100-point scale.; Sources: "Illinois Football Commitments". Rivals.; "2017 Illinois Football Commits". Scout.; "ESPN". ESPN.; "Scout.com Team Recruiting Rankings". Scout.; "2017 Team Ranking". Rivals.com.

== Schedule ==
Illinois announced its 2017 football schedule on July 11, 2013. The 2017 schedule consisted of 7 home and 5 away games in the regular season. The Fighting Illini hosted Big Ten foes Indiana, Nebraska, Northwestern, Rutgers, Wisconsin, and traveled to Iowa, Minnesota, Ohio State, and Purdue.

The Fighting Illini hosted two of the three non-conference opponents, Ball State from the Mid-American Conference and Western Kentucky (WKU) from Conference USA, and traveled to South Florida from the American Athletic Conference.

Date	Time	Opponent	Site	TV	Result	Attendance
September 2	11:00 a.m.	Ball State*	Memorial Stadium; Champaign, IL	BTN	W 24–21	42,505
September 9	7:00 p.m.	Western Kentucky*	Memorial Stadium; Champaign, IL	BTN	W 20–7	41,923
September 15	6:00 p.m.	at No. 22 South Florida*	Raymond James Stadium; Tampa, FL	ESPN	L 23–47	35,404
September 29	7:00 p.m.	Nebraska	Memorial Stadium; Champaign, IL	FS1	L 6–28	43,058
October 7	11:00 a.m.	at Iowa	Kinnick Stadium; Iowa City, IA	BTN	L 16–45	69,894
October 14	11:00 a.m.	Rutgers	Memorial Stadium; Champaign, IL	BTN	L 24–35	35,675
October 21	2:30 p.m.	at Minnesota	TCF Bank Stadium; Minneapolis, MN	BTN	L 17–24	45,243
October 28	11:00 a.m.	No. 5 Wisconsin^{†}	Memorial Stadium; Champaign, IL	ESPN	L 10–24	42,101
November 4	11:00 a.m.	at Purdue	Ross–Ade Stadium; West Lafayette, IN (rivalry)	BTN	L 10–29	46,027
November 11	11:00 a.m.	Indiana	Memorial Stadium; Champaign, IL (rivalry)	BTN	L 14–24	40,195
November 18	2:30 p.m.	at No. 8 Ohio State	Ohio Stadium; Columbus, OH (Illibuck)	ABC	L 14–52	105,282
November 25	3:00 p.m.	No. 23 Northwestern	Memorial Stadium; Champaign, IL (rivalry)	FS1	L 7–42	30,456
*Non-conference game; ^{†}Homecoming; Rankings from AP Poll released prior to the game; All times are in Central time

== Game summaries ==
=== Ball State ===
	1	2	3	4	Total
Cardinals	7	0	14	0	21
Fighting Illini	6	10	0	8	24

=== WKU ===
	1	2	3	4	Total
Hilltoppers	0	0	0	7	7
Fighting Illini	3	10	7	0	20

=== At South Florida ===
	1	2	3	4	Total
Fighting Illini	2	7	0	14	23
No. 22 Bulls	9	14	14	10	47

=== Nebraska ===
	1	2	3	4	Total
Cornhuskers	7	14	0	7	28
Fighting Illini	0	3	3	0	6

=== At Iowa ===
	1	2	3	4	Total
Fighting Illini	3	10	3	0	16
Hawkeyes	7	10	7	21	45

=== Rutgers ===
	1	2	3	4	Total
Scarlet Knights	7	14	7	7	35
Fighting Illini	3	7	0	14	24

=== At Minnesota ===
	1	2	3	4	Total
Fighting Illini	7	0	0	10	17
Golden Gophers	7	0	3	14	24

=== Wisconsin ===
	1	2	3	4	Total
No. 5 Badgers	7	10	0	7	24
Fighting Illini	0	3	0	7	10

=== At Purdue ===
	1	2	3	4	Total
Fighting Illini	7	3	0	0	10
Boilermakers	7	6	3	13	29

=== Indiana ===
	1	2	3	4	Total
Hoosiers	0	14	3	7	24
Fighting Illini	0	0	7	7	14

=== At Ohio State ===
	1	2	3	4	Total
Fighting Illini	0	0	7	7	14
Buckeyes	28	10	7	7	52

=== Northwestern ===
	1	2	3	4	Total
Wildcats	0	14	14	14	42
Fighting Illini	7	0	0	0	7

== Roster ==
2017 Illinois Fighting Illini football team roster
Players
Coaches
Offense

Pos.	#	Name	Class
RB	2	Reggie Corbin	So
QB	3	Jeff George, Jr.	So
WR	4	Ricky Smalling	Fr
WR	5	Carmoni Green	Fr
QB	7	Chayce Crouch	Jr
WR	8	Dominic Thieman	So
WR	9	Sam Mays	Jr
QB	10	Cam Thomas	Fr
WR	11	Malik Turner	Sr
QB	12	Charlie Reinkemeyer	Fr
TE	13	Caleb Reams	So
QB	14	Cam Miller	Fr
QB	15	Trenard Davis	So
QB	16	Connor Kelly	Fr
WR	17	Kendall Smith	Fr
WR	18	Mike Dudek	Jr
TE	19	Louis Dorsey	Fr
RB	21	Ra'Von Bonner	Fr
RB	22	Kendrick Foster	Sr
RB	26	Mike Epstein	Fr
RB	27	Dre Brown	So
RB	29	Christian Bobak	Fr
RB	36	Austin Roberts	Jr
TE	38	Brandon Roberts	Sr
TE	39	Nathan Echard	Sr
TE	45	Henry McGrew	Jr
OL	52	Adam Solomon	So
OL	53	Nick Allegretti	Jr
OL	63	Alex Palczewski	Fr
OL	65	Doug Kramer	Fr
OL	66	Jordan Fagan	Sr
OL	67	Christian DiLauro	Sr
OL	68	Jake Stover	Fr
OL	71	Zeke Martin	So
OL	72	Gabe Megginson	So
OL	73	Jake Cerny	Fr
OL	75	Kurt Gavin	Fr
OL	76	Larry Boyd	Fr
OL	79	Vederian Lowe	Fr
TE	81	Griffin Palmer	Fr
WR	82	William DuPont	Fr
TE	83	Bobby Walker	So
WR	84	James Bartholomew	Fr
TE	85	Andrew Trainer	So
RB	88	Brandon Jones	Fr
TE	89	Alex Pihlstrom	Fr

Defense

Pos.	#	Name	Class
DB	1	Jaylen Dunlap	Sr
LB	2	Julian Jones	Jr
LB	3	Del'Shawn Phillips	Jr
DB	4	Bennett Williams	Fr
DL	5	James Crawford	Sr
DB	6	Tony Adams	Fr
DB	7	Stanley Green	So
LB	9	Dele Harding	So
LB	10	James Knight	Fr
DB	12	Chris James	Jr
DB	20	Harvey Clayton, Jr.	Fr
DB	21	Patrick Nelson	So
DB	23	Frank Sumpter	So
DB	24	Dawson DeGroot	Fr
DB	25	Nate Hobbs	Fr
DB	26	Evan Jones	Fr
DB	27	Ahmari Hayes	Sr
DB	28	Nolan Bernat	So
DB	30	Julian Hylton	Jr
DB	31	Cameron Watkins	So
LB	32	Justice Williams	So
LB	33	Tré Watson	Jr
LB	34	Christion Abercrombie	Fr
LB	35	Jake Hansen	So
DB	37	Zach Holman	Jr
LB	41	Jimmy Marchese	So
DB	42	Michael Marchese	Fr
LB	44	Drew Murtaugh	Fr
DL	47	Sean Adesanya	Jr
DL	48	Kevin Hinders	Fr
LB	52	Ayo Shogbonyo	Fr
LB	54	Marc Mondesir	Fr
DL	55	Jamal Milan	So
DL	90	Lere Oladipo	Fr
DL	91	Jamal Woods	Fr
DL	92	Isaiah Gay	Fr
DL	94	Tito Odenigbo	Jr
DL	95	Kenyon Jackson	So
DL	96	Tymir Oliver	So
DL	97	Bobby Roundtree	Fr
DL	98	Deon Pate	Fr
DL	99	Owen Carney Jr.	Fr

Special teams

Pos.	#	Name	Class
P	14	Blake Hayes	Fr
K	17	James McCourt	Fr
P	37	Bryce Baringer	Fr
P	40	Ryan Tucker	Jr
K	43	Chase McLaughlin	Jr
LS	56	Ethan Tabel	Fr
LS	58	Sean Mills	So

Head coach

- Lovie Smith

Coordinators/assistant coaches

- Garrick McGee – Offensive Coordinator / Quarterbacks
- Hardy Nickerson – Defensive Coordinator / Linebackers
- Mike Phair – Run Game Coordinator / Defensive Line
- Bob Ligashesky – Special Teams Coordinator / Tight Ends
- Donnie Abraham – Safeties
- Luke Butkus – Offensive Line
- Andrew Hayes-Stoker – Wide Receivers
- Thad Ward – Running Backs
- Paul Williams – Cornerbacks
- Joe Fotu - Graduate Assistant - Defense
- Brett Nelson - Graduate Assistant - Offense
- Shane Toub - Graduate Assistant - Offense
- Robert Wright - Graduate Assistant - Defense
- Charles Drewek - Defensive Analyst
- Kingsley Osei-Asibey - Defensive Analyst
- Nathan Scheelhaase - Offensive Analyst
- Tim Knox - Director of Football Operations
- James Kirkland - Director of Player Personnel
- Tre' Stallings - Director of Football Player Development
- Patrick Embleton - Director of Football Student-Athlete Development
- Nathan McNeal - Director of High School Relations
- Travis Perry - Graphics/Social Media
- Joey Boese - Head Football Strength & Conditioning Coach
- Jeremy Busch - Head Football Athletic Trainer
- Trent Chestnut - Head Football Equipment Manager
- Alex Benizzi - Director of Football Video

Legend

- (C) Team captain
- (S) Suspended
- (I) Ineligible
- Injured
- Redshirt

Roster
Last update: October 13, 2016
