= Ryan Anderson (punter) =

American football player (born 1985)

Profile
- Position: Punter

Personal information
- Born: May 2, 1995 (age 31); DeWitt, Michigan, U.S.
- Listed height: 6 ft 1 in (1.85 m)
- Listed weight: 197 lb (89 kg)

Career information
- High school: Dewitt (MI)
- College: Olivet; Rutgers
- NFL draft: 2018: undrafted

Career history
- Birmingham Iron (2019); New York Giants (2019)*; Chicago Bears (2023)*
- * Offseason or practice squad member only

Awards and highlights
- Big Ten Punter of the Year (2017); First-team All-Big Ten (2017)

Ryan Anderson (born May 2, 1995) is an American former football punter. He played college football for the Rutgers Scarlet Knights.

== College career ==
During his sole season as a graduate transfer with Rutgers, Anderson set the Scarlet Knights all-time single-season punting average record, was a Ray Guy Award watch list and first-team All-Big Ten.

- First Team All Big-Ten Punter at Rutgers University (First in school history)

- Single Season Punting Average Record Holder at Rutgers University

- Edelman-Fields Big Ten Punter of the Year

- 2× CoSiDA First Team Academic All-American including First Team Academic All-American of the Year in 2016 - 4.0 G.P.A.

- 2× AFCA First Team All-American Punter

- NCAA DIII National Record Holder for Punting Average in a season

- #1 Overall Punter in Olivet College Football History (Since 1884)

== Professional career ==
Anderson went undrafted in the 2018 NFL draft, and participated in a rookie minicamp with the New England Patriots, but no deal was reached and Anderson sat out the 2018 season.

Anderson earned a roster spot with the Birmingham Iron of the now defunct Alliance of American Football, but was replaced with a different punter who had ties to the coaching staff.

Anderson signed with New York Giants after a tryout at their rookie minicamp on May 5, 2019. He was waived on August 14, 2019.

On April 10, 2023, Anderson signed with the Chicago Bears. On July 25, 2023, he was waived.
