= David Steinmetz (American football) =

American football player (born 1995)

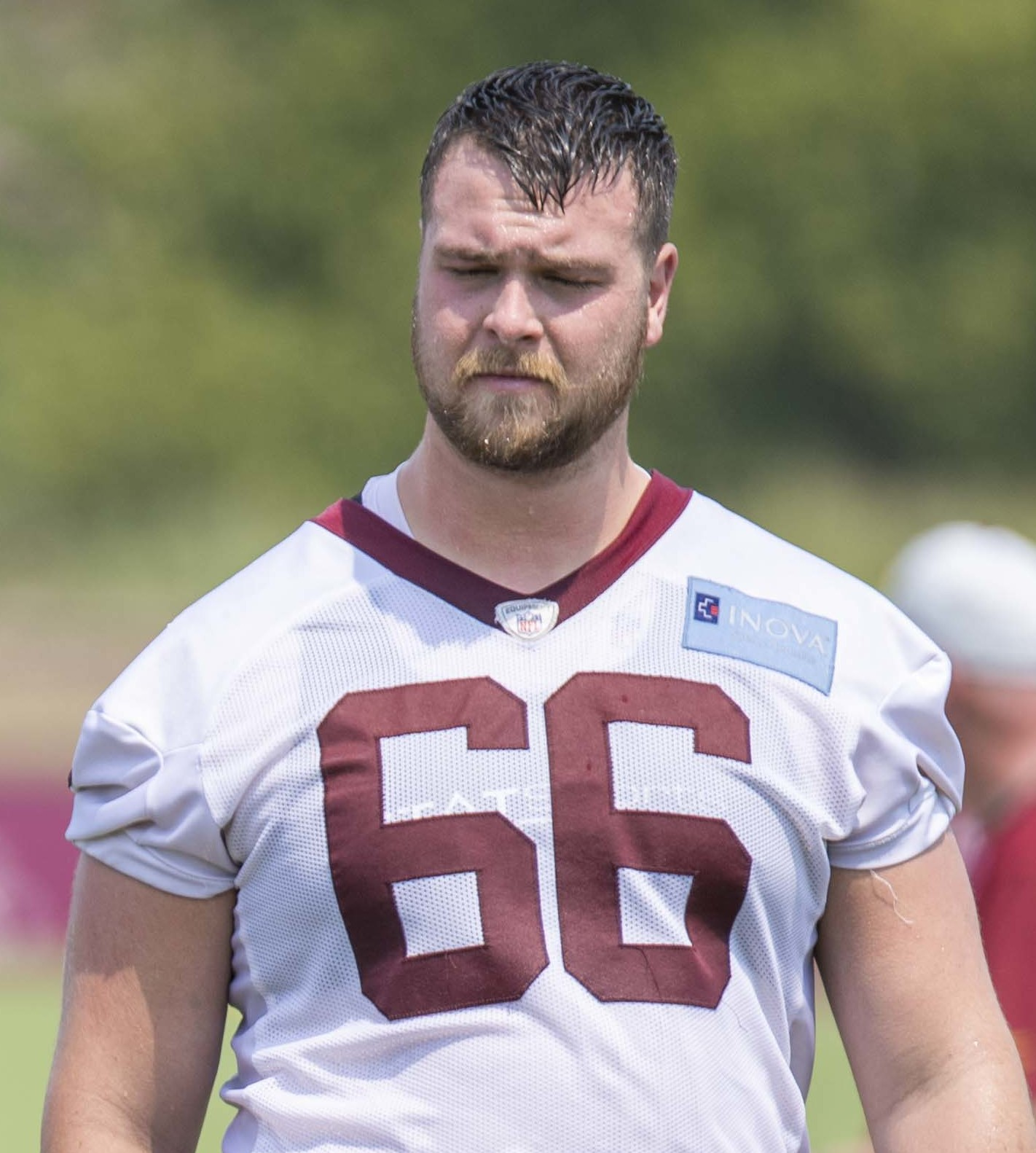
- Steinmetz with the Washington Football Team in 2021

Profile
- Position: Offensive tackle

Personal information
- Born: March 1, 1995 (age 31); Grafton, Massachusetts, U.S.
- Listed height: 6 ft 8 in (2.03 m)
- Listed weight: 321 lb (146 kg)

Career information
- High school: Grafton
- College: Purdue
- NFL draft: 2018: undrafted

Career history
- Miami Dolphins (2018)*; Houston Texans (2018–2019); Washington Football Team (2020–2021); Kansas City Chiefs (2022)*
- * Offseason or practice squad member only

Career NFL statistics
- Games played: 4
- Stats at Pro Football Reference

David Steinmetz (born March 1, 1995) is an American football offensive tackle. He played college football at Purdue and has also been a member of the Miami Dolphins, Houston Texans, Washington Football Team and Kansas City Chiefs.

== Professional career ==
=== Miami Dolphins ===
Steinmetz signed with the Miami Dolphins as an undrafted free agent following the 2018 NFL draft on May 10, 2018. He was waived during final roster cuts on September 1, 2018.

=== Houston Texans ===
Steinmetz signed with the Houston Texans' practice squad on November 20, 2018. He signed a reserve/futures contract with the team after the season on January 7, 2019. He suffered a broken ankle during training camp and was placed on injured reserve on August 26, 2019. He was waived on August 13, 2020.

=== Washington Football Team ===
Steinmetz signed with the Washington Football Team on August 21, 2020. He was waived during final roster cuts on September 5, 2020, and signed to the team's practice squad two days later. He was elevated to the active roster on November 21 and November 25 for the team's weeks 11 and 12 games against the Cincinnati Bengals and Dallas Cowboys, and reverted to the practice squad after each game. Steinmetz was promoted to Washington's active roster on December 12, 2020. was released on August 31, 2021, but re-signed to the practice squad the following day. On the Week 15 game against the Philadelphia Eagles, he was elevated to the active roster as a COVID-19 replacement player.

=== Kansas City Chiefs ===
On July 25, 2022, Steinmetz signed with the Kansas City Chiefs. He was waived on August 22, 2022.
