= Nick Nelson (American football) =

American football player (born 1996)

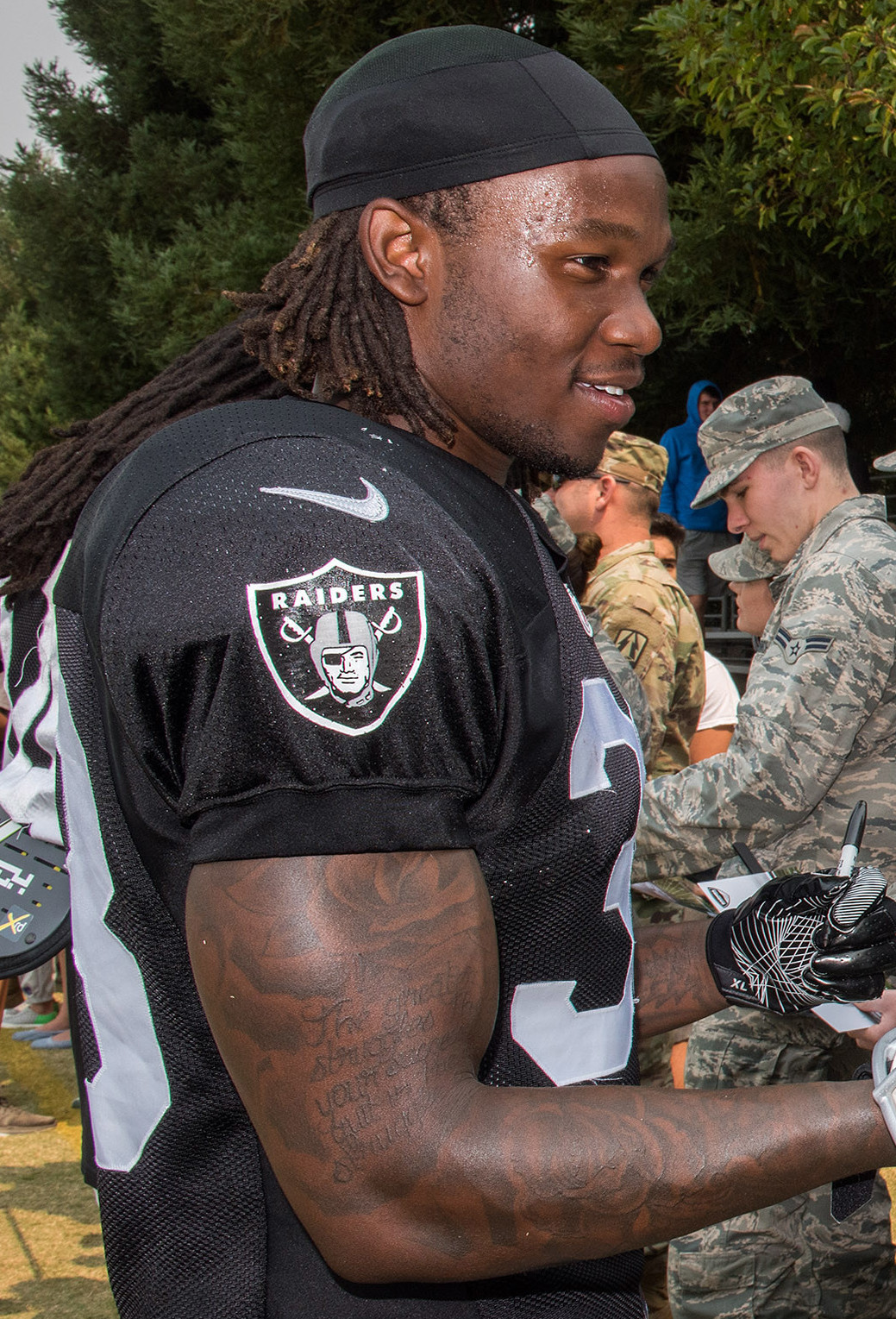
- Nelson with the Oakland Raiders in 2018

No. 23
- Position: Cornerback

Personal information
- Born: October 16, 1996 (age 30); Florence, South Carolina, U.S.
- Listed height: 5 ft 11 in (1.80 m)
- Listed weight: 205 lb (93 kg)

Career information
- High school: Suitland (Suitland, Maryland)
- College: Hawaii (2014–2015); Wisconsin (2016–2017)
- NFL draft: 2018: 4th round, 110th overall pick

Career history
- Oakland Raiders (2018–2019); Indianapolis Colts (2021)

Awards and highlights
- Second-team All-American (2017); First-team All-Big Ten (2017)

Career NFL statistics
- Total tackles: 20
- Fumble recoveries: 1
- Pass deflections: 1
- Stats at Pro Football Reference

Nick Nelson (born October 16, 1996) is an American former professional football player who was a cornerback in the National Football League (NFL). He played college football for the Hawaii Rainbow Warriors and Wisconsin Badgers.

== Professional career ==
Pre-draft measurables
Height	Weight	Arm length	Hand span	40-yard dash	Broad jump	Bench press
5 ft 10 5/8 in (1.79 m)	200 lb (91 kg)	30 3/4 in (0.78 m)	9 1/4 in (0.23 m)	4.52 s	10 ft 3 in (3.12 m)	17 reps
All values from NFL Combine

=== Oakland Raiders ===
Nelson was selected by the Oakland Raiders in the fourth round (110th overall) of the 2018 NFL draft.

On August 31, 2019, Nelson was waived by the Raiders and re-signed to the practice squad. He was promoted to the active roster on December 11, 2019. He was placed on injured reserve on December 24, 2019.

On May 18, 2020, Nelson was waived by the Raiders with a failed physical designation, and reverted to the team's reserve/physically unable to perform list the next day. He was waived with a failed physical designation on September 1, 2020.

=== Indianapolis Colts ===
On January 5, 2021, Nelson signed a reserve/future contract with the Indianapolis Colts. He was waived/injured on August 17 and placed on injured reserve.

=== Career stats ===
Year	Team	Games		Tackles				Fumbles			Interceptions					
Year	Team	GP	GS	Comb	Total	Ast	Sack	FF	FR	Yds	INT	Yds	Avg	Lng	TD	PD
2018	OAK	10	3	20	10	10	0	0	1	0	0	0	0	0	0	1
2019	OAK	2	0	0	0	0	0	0	0	0	0	0	0	0	0	0
Career		12	3	20	10	10	0	0	1	0	0	0	0	0	0	1
