= Natrell Jamerson =

American gridiron football player (born 1995)

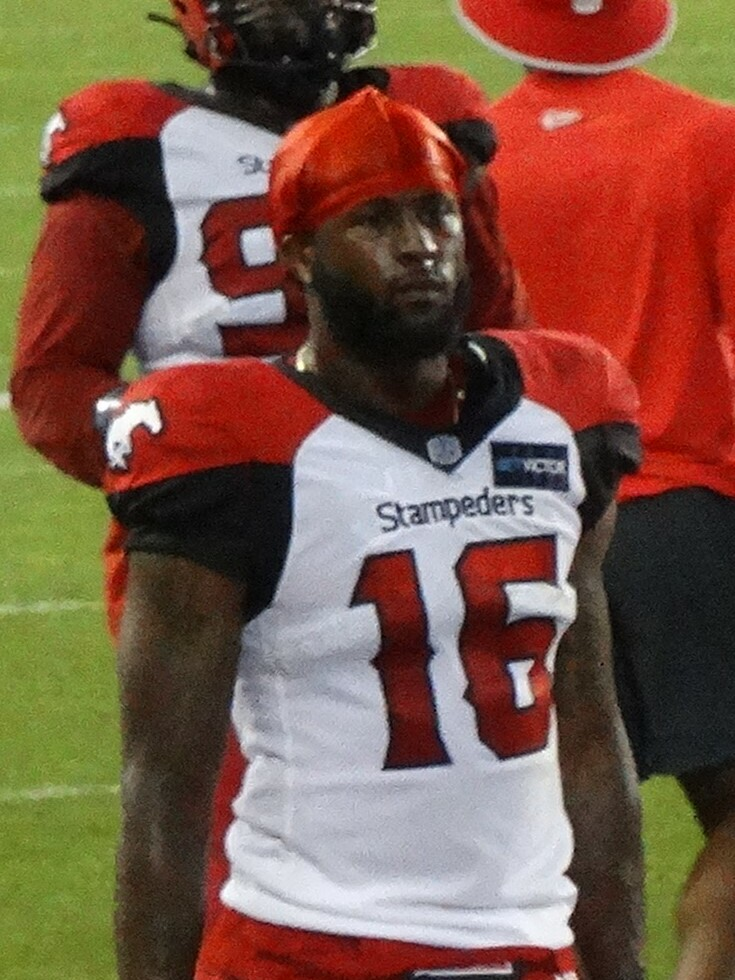
- Jamerson with the Calgary Stampeders in 2022

Profile
- Position: Defensive back

Personal information
- Born: December 15, 1995 (age 30); Ocala, Florida, U.S.
- Listed height: 5 ft 11 in (1.80 m)
- Listed weight: 200 lb (91 kg)

Career information
- High school: Vanguard (Ocala, Florida)
- College: Wisconsin
- NFL draft: 2018: 5th round, 164th overall pick

Career history
- New Orleans Saints (2018)*; Houston Texans (2018); Green Bay Packers (2018); Carolina Panthers (2019–2020); New Orleans Saints (2021)*; New York Jets (2021)*; New York Giants (2021)*; Las Vegas Raiders (2022)*; Calgary Stampeders (2022–2023)
- * Offseason or practice squad member only

Career NFL statistics
- Total tackles: 13
- Pass deflections: 1
- Stats at Pro Football Reference

Career CFL statistics
- Total tackles: 12
- Sacks: 0
- fumbles: 0
- Interceptions: 0

Natrell Jamerson (born December 15, 1995) is an American professional football defensive back. He played college football at Wisconsin. Jamerson played wide receiver first with the Badgers before switching to cornerback and later safety. Jamerson has been a member of the New Orleans Saints, Houston Texans, Green Bay Packers, Carolina Panthers, New York Jets, New York Giants and Las Vegas Raiders of the National Football League (NFL), and the Calgary Stampeders of the Canadian Football League (CFL).

== College career ==
Jamerson was a three-star wide receiver recruit at Vanguard High School in Ocala, Florida. During his sophomore season with the Wisconsin Badgers football team, he returned a kickoff 98 yards for a touchdown against Maryland. He missed time during his junior season with due to a broken fibula but managed to intercept two passes. After his senior season, he received the Defensive MVP award in the 2018 East-West Shrine Game.

== Professional career ==
=== Pre-draft ===
Pre-draft measurables
| Height | Weight | Arm length | Hand span | 40-yard dash | Vertical jump | Broad jump | Bench press |
|---|---|---|---|---|---|---|---|
| 5 ft 10 5/8 in (1.79 m) | 201 lb (91 kg) | 32 5/8 in (0.83 m) | 9 3/4 in (0.25 m) | 4.40 s | 35.5 in (0.90 m) | 10 ft 0 in (3.05 m) | 25 reps |
All values from NFL Combine

At the 2018 NFL Scouting Combine, Jamerson recorded a 4.4 second time in the 40-yard dash. Scouting reports noted his special teams prowess and his understanding of a complex Wisconsin defensive scheme.

=== New Orleans Saints (first stint) ===
Jamerson was drafted by the New Orleans Saints in the fifth round, 164th overall, of the 2018 NFL draft. On May 10, 2018, Jamerson signed his rookie contract with the Saints. He was waived by the Saints on September 1, 2018.

=== Houston Texans ===
On September 2, 2018, Jamerson was claimed off waivers by the Houston Texans. He played in 10 games before being waived on December 4, 2018.

=== Green Bay Packers ===
On December 5, 2018, Jamerson was claimed off waivers by the Green Bay Packers. He was released on August 31, 2019.

=== Carolina Panthers ===
On September 1, 2019, Jamerson was claimed off waivers by the Carolina Panthers. He was placed on injured reserve on October 22, 2019 with a foot injury.

Jamerson was waived by the Panthers on September 5, 2020, and signed to the practice squad the next day. He was placed on the practice squad/COVID-19 list by the team on September 9, and restored to the practice squad on September 29. He was elevated to the active roster on October 29, November 21, and November 28 for the team's weeks 8, 11, and 12 games against the Atlanta Falcons, Detroit Lions, and Minnesota Vikings, and reverted to the practice squad after each game. He was signed to the active roster on December 11, 2020. He was released with a "failed physical" designation on February 12, 2021.

=== New Orleans Saints (second stint) ===
On August 18, 2021, Jamerson signed with the New Orleans Saints. He was waived on August 31, 2021.

=== New York Jets ===
On October 6, 2021, the New York Jets signed Jamerson to their practice squad. He was released on November 24.

=== New York Giants ===
On December 6, 2021, Jamerson was signed to the New York Giants practice squad. His contract expired when the teams season ended on January 9, 2022.

=== Las Vegas Raiders ===
On January 18, 2022, Jamerson signed a reserve/future contract with the Las Vegas Raiders. He was released on March 25, 2022.

=== Calgary Stampeders ===
On April 18, 2022, Jamerson signed with the Calgary Stampeders of the Canadian Football League. Jamerson was released by the Stampeders after the team's first pre-season game. He re-signed with the Stampeders on August 1, 2022, midway through the 2022 season. He became a free agent upon the expiry of his contract on February 13, 2024.

== NFL career statistics ==
Regular season statistics
| Year | Team | Games | | Tackles | | | | Interceptions | | | | | | Fumbles | |
| Year | Team | GP | GS | Comb | Total | Ast | Sck | PD | Int | Yds | Avg | Lng | TDs | FF | FR |
|---|---|---|---|---|---|---|---|---|---|---|---|---|---|---|---|
| 2018 | HOU | 10 | 0 | 7 | 6 | 1 | 0 | 1 | 0 | 0 | 0 | 0 | 0 | 0 | 0 |
| 2018 | GB | 2 | 0 | 3 | 2 | 1 | 0 | 0 | 0 | 0 | 0 | 0 | 0 | 0 | 0 |
| Career | | 12 | 0 | 10 | 8 | 2 | 0 | 1 | 0 | 0 | 0 | 0 | 0 | 0 | 0 |
Source: NFL.com
