= Carter Coughlin =

American football player (born 1997)

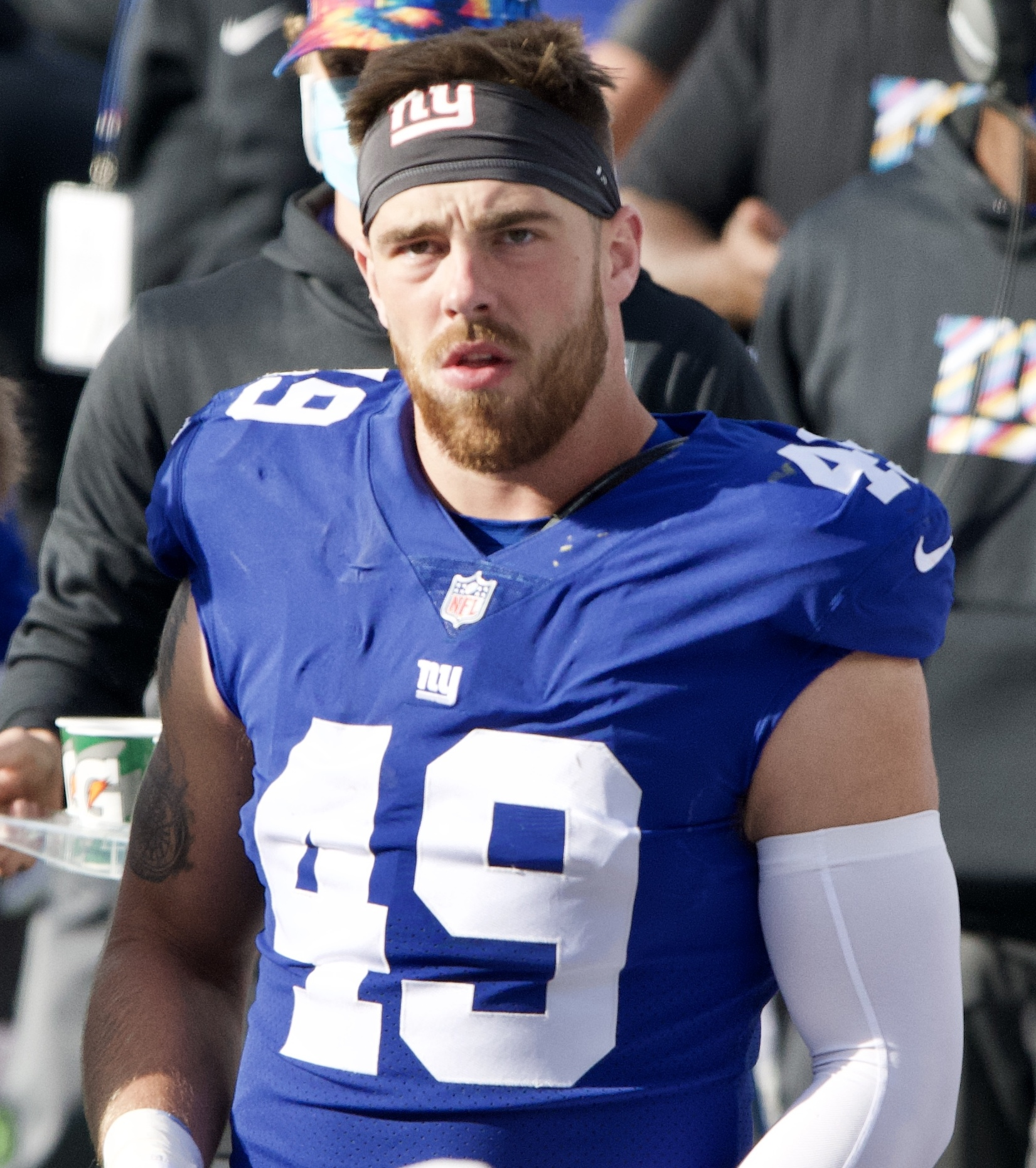
- Coughlin at MetLife Stadium in 2020

Profile
- Position: Linebacker

Personal information
- Born: July 21, 1997 (age 29); Eden Prairie, Minnesota, U.S.
- Listed height: 6 ft 3 in (1.91 m)
- Listed weight: 240 lb (109 kg)

Career information
- High school: Eden Prairie
- College: Minnesota (2016–2019)
- NFL draft: 2020: 7th round, 218th overall pick

Career history
- New York Giants (2020–2024)

Awards and highlights
- 2× Second-team All-Big Ten (2018, 2019)

Career NFL statistics
- Total tackles: 41
- Sacks: 1
- Forced fumbles: 1
- Fumble recoveries: 1
- Stats at Pro Football Reference

Carter Coughlin (born July 21, 1997) is an American professional football linebacker. He played college football for the Minnesota Golden Gophers and was selected by the New York Giants in the seventh round of the 2020 NFL draft.

== Early life ==
Coughlin grew up in Eden Prairie, Minnesota and attended Eden Prairie High School, where he played basketball and football. He helped lead the Eagles to back-to-back state championships as a sophomore and junior. As a senior, he recorded 35 tackles, 7.0 tackles for loss, two pass breakups and one fumble recovery. He was named first-team All-State and played in the All-American Bowl. A 4-star recruit, Coughlin committed to Minnesota over offers from Iowa, Michigan State, Ohio State, Pittsburgh, Oregon, and Wisconsin.

== College career ==
Coughlin played in 11 games as a true freshman and finished the season with 25 tackles including four tackles for loss and two sacks. He became a starter at outside linebacker going into his sophomore season and was named honorable mention All-Big Ten Conference after leading the Golden Gophers with 11.5 for a loss and 6.5 sacks. As a junior, Coughlin recorded 48 tackles and led the team with 9.5 sacks, 15 tackles for loss and four forced fumbles and was named second-team All-Big Ten. Coughlin was named second-team All-Big Ten again as a senior after making 49 tackles with 9.5 for loss and 4.5 sacks.

== Professional career ==
Pre-draft measurables
Height	Weight	Arm length	Hand span	40-yard dash	10-yard split	20-yard split	Vertical jump	Broad jump
6 ft 3 1/8 in (1.91 m)	236 lb (107 kg)	31 3/8 in (0.80 m)	9 1/2 in (0.24 m)	4.57 s	1.54 s	2.67 s	36.0 in (0.91 m)	10 ft 6 in (3.20 m)
All values from NFL Combine

Coughlin was selected by the New York Giants in the seventh round with the 218th overall pick in the 2020 NFL draft. In Week 8 against the Tampa Bay Buccaneers on Monday Night Football, Coughlin recorded his first career sack on Tom Brady during the Bucs’ 25–23 win.

On November 1, 2021, Coughlin was placed on injured reserve.

On March 11, 2024, Coughlin re-signed with the Giants. He was released on September 5, and re-signed to the practice squad.
