= Brett Toth =

American football player and United States army officer (born 1996)

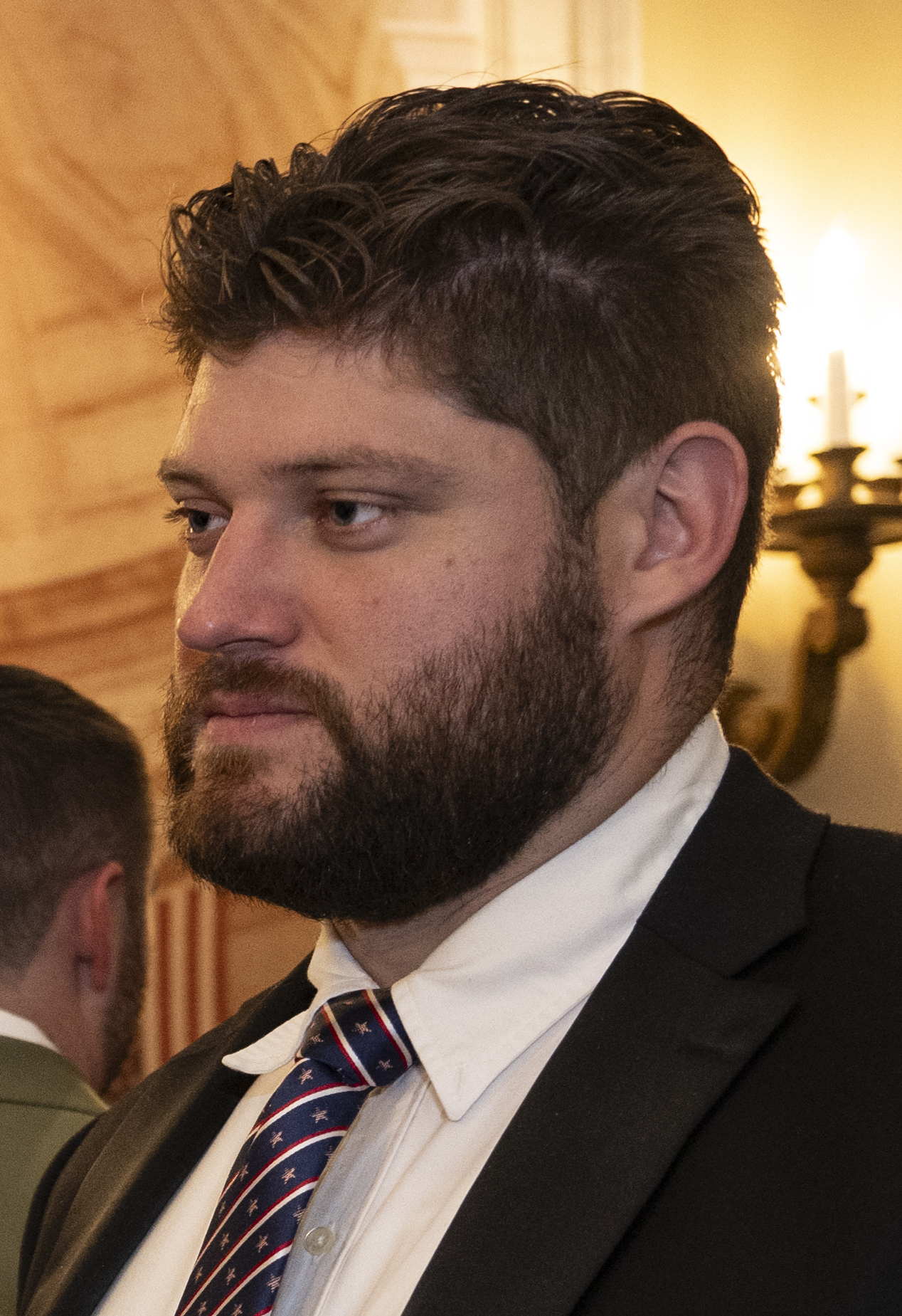
- Toth in 2025

Profile
- Position: Center

Personal information
- Born: September 1, 1996 (age 30); Charleston, South Carolina, U.S.
- Listed height: 6 ft 6 in (1.98 m)
- Listed weight: 304 lb (138 kg)

Career information
- High school: West Ashley
- College: Army (2014–2017)
- NFL draft: 2018: undrafted

Career history
- Philadelphia Eagles (2019)*; Arizona Cardinals (2019–2020); Philadelphia Eagles (2020–2023); Carolina Panthers (2023); Philadelphia Eagles (2023–2025); San Francisco 49ers (2026)*
- * Offseason or practice squad member only

Awards and highlights
- Super Bowl champion (LIX)

Career NFL statistics as of 2025
- Games played: 37
- Games started: 6
- Stats at Pro Football Reference

Brett Marshall Toth (born September 1, 1996) is an American professional football center. Prior to joining the NFL, he attended and graduated from the United States Military Academy as a second lieutenant in the US Army, where he also played for the Army Black Knights football team. Toth deferred his service to play in the NFL, where he signed as an undrafted free agent with the Eagles in 2019. He has been a member of the Arizona Cardinals and was a ROTC instructor at Arizona State University; he currently serves in a similar role at Temple University.

== Early life ==
Toth attended West Ashley High School in Charleston, South Carolina.

== United States Military Academy ==
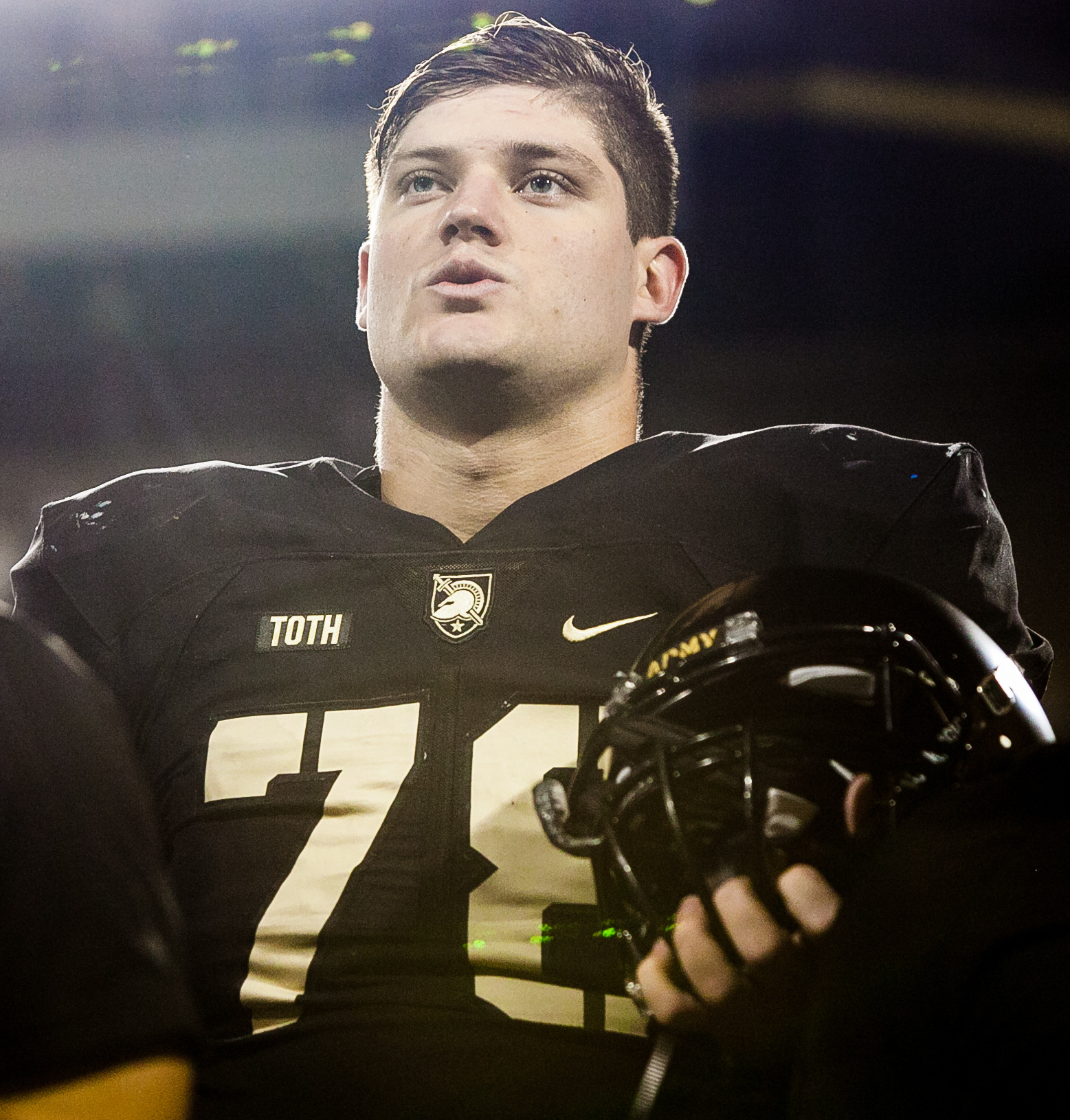
Toth with Army in 2017

Toth studied physics and nuclear engineering at the United States Military Academy and became the first player to represent the Army Black Knights football team at the Senior Bowl in 2018. He also played in the 2018 East–West Shrine Game. As a junior for the 2016 Army Black Knights football team triple option offense, which finished second in the country with a 339.5 yards of offense per game. During his senior season, the 2017 Army Black Knights led the nation in offense. During that season, Army rushed 785 times last season and attempted just 65 forward passes. Toth served as a graduate assistant for the 2018 Black Knights and he executed the engineering officer training, earning a platoon leader role.

== Professional career ==
=== Pre-draft ===
Pre-draft measurables
| Height | Weight | Arm length | Hand span | Wingspan | 40-yard dash | 10-yard split | 20-yard split | 20-yard shuttle | Three-cone drill | Vertical jump | Broad jump | Bench press |
|---|---|---|---|---|---|---|---|---|---|---|---|---|
| 6 ft 5 3/4 in (1.97 m) | 291 lb (132 kg) | 33 3/8 in (0.85 m) | 10 1/4 in (0.26 m) | 6 ft 8 5/8 in (2.05 m) | 5.14 s | 1.78 s | 2.96 s | 4.75 s | 7.40 s | 25.0 in (0.64 m) | 8 ft 7 in (2.62 m) | 16 reps |
All values from NFL Combine/Pro Day

When Toth entered his commitment at West Point, there was a 5-year service commitment. However, the policy was changed to 24 months during his stay. There had been precedent (such as Joe Cardona of the 2015 NFL draft) for military school graduates to be allowed to defer their 24-month service policy, but in 2017, United States Secretary of Defense Jim Mattis rescinded the policy to allow military service academy student-athlete graduates to delay their assignments to explore professional sports opportunities. In June 2019, United States President Donald Trump requested that a policy be established to facilitate athletic pursuits and 2019 NFL draft selectee Austin Cutting was the first to sign a professional contract following the new policy. When Toth applied for his waiver in August 2019, he was stationed at Fort Leonard Wood in Missouri. Toth cites Alejandro Villanueva, Collin Mooney and Josh McNary as his role models. Toth had served a year as a second lieutenant before being granted a deferment.

=== Philadelphia Eagles (first stint) ===
In August 2019, he signed a three-year contract with the Philadelphia Eagles even though he had already missed all of training camp and two preseason games.

=== Arizona Cardinals ===
The Eagles waived Toth, but he was claimed by the Arizona Cardinals at the end of the 2019 preseason. He was placed on the reserve/non-football illness list by the Cardinals on October 19, 2019.

On September 4, 2020, Toth was waived/injured by the Cardinals, and reverted to the team's injured reserve list two days later. He was waived from injured reserve on October 6, 2020.

=== Philadelphia Eagles (second stint) ===
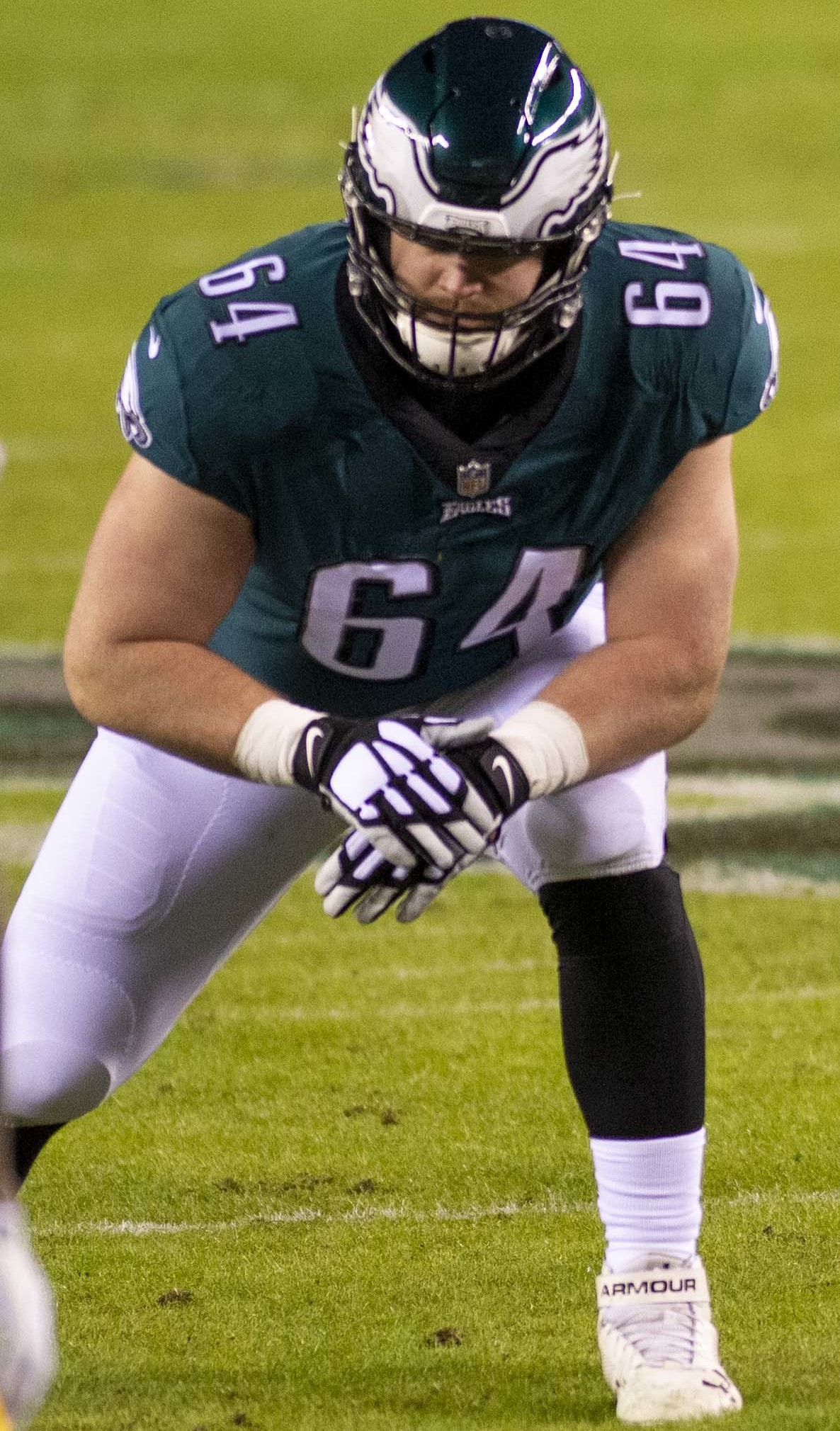
Toth with the Eagles in 2021.

On October 7, 2020, Toth was claimed off waivers by the Eagles, where he made his NFL debut in Week 6 against the Baltimore Ravens.

On November 2, 2021, Toth was waived by the Eagles and re-signed to the practice squad. He was promoted to the active roster on November 30. Toth got extended playing time at center in week 17 against the Dallas Cowboys when the Eagles were resting their starters, but suffered a knee injury in the second quarter. He was placed on injured reserve on January 10, 2022. He was placed on the Active/PUP list on July 27, 2022. He was placed on the reserve list to start the season on August 23, 2022. Without Toth, the Eagles made Super Bowl LVII but lost 38-35 to the Kansas City Chiefs.

Toth was released on August 27, 2023 and re-signed to the practice squad.

=== Carolina Panthers ===
On October 24, 2023, Toth was signed by the Carolina Panthers off the Eagles practice squad. He was waived on December 4.

=== Philadelphia Eagles (third stint) ===
On December 7, 2023, Toth was signed to the Eagles practice squad. He signed a reserve/future contract on January 18, 2024. He was released on August 27, and re-signed to the practice squad. He was promoted to the active roster on January 10, 2025. He won a Super Bowl championship when the Eagles defeated the Kansas City Chiefs 40–22 in Super Bowl LIX.

=== San Francisco 49ers ===
On March 12, 2026, Toth signed a one-year contract with the San Francisco 49ers. He was placed on season–ending injured reserve on August 30 due to recurring concussion symptoms from the previous season. On October 19, Toth was released with an injury settlement.
