= 2018 Senior Bowl =

2018 Reese's Senior Bowl
- 69th Senior Bowl
North Team	South Team
16	45
Head coach: Vance Joseph (Denver Broncos)	Head coach: Bill O' Brien (Houston Texans)
	1	2	3	4	Total
North	3	0	13	0	16
South	10	8	20	7	45
- Date: January 27, 2018
- Season: 2017
- Stadium: Ladd–Peebles Stadium
- Location: Mobile, Alabama
- MVP: Kyle Lauletta (QB, Richmond)
- Favorite: North by 6
- Referee: Kevin Mar
- Attendance: 29,606

United States TV coverage
- Network: NFL Network

The 2018 Senior Bowl was an all-star college football exhibition game featuring players from the 2017 NCAA Division I FBS football season, and prospects for the 2018 draft of the professional National Football League (NFL). The game was the last of the 2017–18 bowl games and the final game of the 2017 FBS football season. It was sponsored by Reese's Peanut Butter Cups and was officially known as the Reese's Senior Bowl.

The game was played on January 27, 2018, at 1:30 p.m. CST, at Ladd–Peebles Stadium in Mobile, Alabama, between "North" and "South" teams; coverage of the event was provided by NFL Network.

Bowl organizers announced that, for the first time, RFID devices would be used to track players and footballs during practices and the game. The maker of the RFID devices, Zebra Sports Solutions, was also announced as a corporate sponsor of the game.

== Rosters ==
In late December 2017, bowl organizers announced that Heisman Trophy winner Baker Mayfield of Oklahoma would appear in the game; the most recent Heisman Trophy winner to play in the Senior Bowl was Tim Tebow in the 2010 game. Full rosters were announced on January 18, 2018. The head coaches were Vance Joseph of the Denver Broncos and Bill O' Brien of the Houston Texans, for the North and South teams, respectively.

=== North team ===
No.	Player	Position	HT/WT	College	Notes
0	Ja'Whaun Bentley	ILB	6'2/260	Purdue	
1	Christian Campbell	CB	6'1/194	Penn State	
2	Marcus Allen	S	6'2/202	Penn State	
3	Luke Falk†	QB	6'4/223	Washington State	Did not play, in order to attend funeral of Tyler Hilinski.
4	Fred Warner	ILB	6'4/230	BYU	
5	DaeSean Hamilton	WR	6'1/205	Penn State	Played in the 2018 East–West Shrine Game
6	Baker Mayfield	QB	6'1/220	Oklahoma	
7	JaMarcus King	CB	6'2/186	South Carolina	
8	Braxton Berrios	WR	5'9/186	Miami (FL)	
9	Mike McCray	ILB	6'4/248	Michigan	
11	Cedrick Wilson Jr.	WR	6'3/188	Boise State	
13	Tanner Lee	QB	6'4/220	Nebraska	Replaced Mason Rudolph, who was injured
14	Darius Phillips	CB	5'10/190	Western Michigan	
15	Justin Watson	WR	6'3/210	Penn	Played in the 2018 East–West Shrine Game
15	Michael Badgley	K	5'10/178	Miami (FL)	
16	Jaleel Scott	WR	6'6/215	New Mexico State	
17	Josh Allen	QB	6'5/233	Wyoming	
19	Johnny Townsend	P	6'1/211	Florida	
20	Isaac Yiadom	CB	6'1/190	Boston College	
21	Jaylen Samuels	RB	5'11/228	NC State	
22	Michael Joseph	CB	6'1/180	Dubuque	
23	Armani Watts	S	5'11/205	Texas A&M	
24	Duke Dawson	CB	5'10/208	Florida	
25	Akrum Wadley	RB	5'11/191	Iowa	
26	Taron Johnson	CB	6'0/185	Weber State	
27	Kalen Ballage	RB	6'3/230	Arizona State	
27	Justin Jones	DT	6'2/312	NC State	
28	Kyzir White	S	6'2/218	West Virginia	
31	Ogbonnia Okoronkwo	DE	6'1/240	Oklahoma	
36	Dimitri Flowers	FB	6'2/247	Oklahoma	
39	Trayvon Henderson	S	6'0/200	Hawaii	
48	Tanner Carew	LS	6'1/242	Oregon	
49	Nick DeLuca	ILB	6'3/245	North Dakota State	
50	Myles Pierce	ILB	6'0/225	The Citadel	
52	Mason Cole	C	6'5/305	Michigan	
55	Garret Dooley	OLB	6'3/246	Wisconsin	
56	Scott Quessenberry	C	6'3/310	UCLA	
57	Wyatt Teller	G	6'5/315	Virginia Tech	
58	Kemoko Turay	OLB	6'5/252	Rutgers	
59	Tyquan Lewis	DE	6'4/265	Ohio State	
61	Cole Madison	G	6'5/314	Washington State	
65	Jamil Demby	OT	6'5/335	Maine	
66	Harrison Phillips	DT	6'4/295	Stanford	
70	Brian O'Neill	OT	6'7/305	Pittsburgh	
73	Tyrell Crosby	OT	6'5/320	Oregon	
76	Will Hernandez	G	6'3/340	UTEP	
78	Brett Toth	OT	6'6/305	Army	
79	Sean Welsh	G	6'3/295	Iowa	
80	Durham Smythe	TE	6'6/257	Notre Dame	
81	Troy Fumagalli	TE	6'6/248	Wisconsin	
83	Tyler Conklin	TE	6'4/240	Central Michigan	
84	Michael Gallup	WR	6'1/200	Colorado State	
85	Allen Lazard	WR	6'5/222	Iowa State	
88	Mike Gesicki	TE	6'6/252	Penn State	
90	Chad Thomas	DE	6'6/275	Miami (FL)	Played in the 2018 East–West Shrine Game
91	Jalyn Holmes	DE	6'5/270	Ohio State	
94	Dewey Jarvis	OLB	6'2/230	Brown	
97	Nathan Shepherd	DT	6'5/300	Fort Hays State	Injured during practice; did not play
98	B. J. Hill	DT	6'4/315	NC State	

† Luke Falk switched his uniform number from 4 to 3 in honor of Tyler Hilinski.

=== South team ===
No.	Player	Position	HT/WT	College	Notes
3	Quin Blanding	S	6'2/210	Virginia	
4	Tre'Quan Smith	WR	6'1/210	Central Florida	
5	Kyle Lauletta	QB	6'3/215	Richmond	Named game MVP
5	Siran Neal	CB	6'1/205	Jacksonville State	
6	Kurt Benkert	QB	6'4/215	Virginia	
7	D. J. Chark	WR	6'4/198	LSU	
9	Da'Shawn Hand	DE	6'4/288	Alabama	
10	J. K. Scott	P	6'6/204	Alabama	
11	Kylie Fitts	DE	6'4/260	Utah	
12	Brandon Silvers	QB	6'3/219	Troy	
13	Marcell Ateman	WR	6'4/220	Oklahoma State	
14	Jeremy Reaves	S	5'11/185	South Alabama	
14	Mike White	QB	6'4/225	Western Kentucky	
15	Nick Bawden	FB	6'3/245	San Diego State	
16	J'Mon Moore	WR	6'3/205	Missouri	
18	Shaquem Griffin	OLB	6'1/223	Central Florida	Griffin was named Overall Practice Player of the Week
19	Nate Andrews	S	6'0/214	Florida State	Added due to injury of Dorian O'Daniel
20	Rashaad Penny	RB	5'11/220	San Diego State	
21	Tray Matthews	S	6'1/209	Auburn	
22	Chandon Sullivan	CB	5'11/195	Georgia State	
23	D'montre Wade	CB	6'0/200	Murray State	
24	Danny Johnson	CB	5'10/194	Southern	
25	Ito Smith	RB	5'9/195	Southern Miss	
26	M. J. Stewart	CB	6'0/205	North Carolina	
27	Kameron Kelly	CB	6'2/200	San Diego State	
28	James Washington	WR	6'0/205	Oklahoma State	
29	Darrel Williams	RB	6'1/229	LSU	
30	Tre' Williams	ILB	6'2/225	Auburn	
38	Daniel Carlson	K	6'4/223	Auburn	
38	Marquis Haynes	OLB	6'3/230	Mississippi	
39	Levi Wallace	CB	6'0/183	Alabama	
42	Uchenna Nwosu	OLB	6'2/240	USC	
50	Shaquille Leonard	ILB	6'3/235	South Carolina State	
51	Taylor Hearn	G	6'5/330	Clemson	
53	Micah Kiser	ILB	6'2/240	Virginia	Injured during practice; did not play
53	Oren Burks	ILB	6'3/230	Vanderbilt	Added due to injury of Micah Kiser
56	Dorian O'Daniel	ILB	6'1/220	Clemson	Injured during practice; did not play
68	Joseph Noteboom	OT	6'5/306	TCU	
69	Ike Powell	LS	6'3/267	Auburn	
70	Colby Gossett	G	6'6/320	Appalachian State	
71	Alex Cappa	OT	6'7/305	Humboldt State	
72	Brandon Parker	OT	6'7/309	North Carolina A&T	
73	Austin Corbett	C	6'4/305	Nevada	
75	Bradley Bozeman	C	6'5/314	Alabama	
77	Isaiah Wynn	G	6'2/302	Georgia	
78	Desmond Harrison	OT	6'6/313	West Georgia	
79	Skyler Phillips	G	6'2/322	Idaho State	
80	Ian Thomas	TE	6'5/248	Indiana	
81	Adam Breneman	TE	6'5/255	UMass	Injured during practice; did not play
86	Dallas Goedert	TE	6'5/255	South Dakota State	Injured during practice; did not play
86	Deon Yelder	TE	6'4/255	Western Kentucky	Added due to injury of Dallas Goedert
88	Jordan Akins	TE	6'4/262	Central Florida	
89	Byron Pringle	WR	6'2/205	Kansas State	
90	Christian LaCouture	DT	6'5/292	LSU	
93	Marcus Davenport	DE	6'7/255	UTSA	
94	Greg Gilmore	DT	6'4/308	LSU	
95	Poona Ford	DT	6'0/305	Texas	Played in the 2018 East–West Shrine Game
99	Andrew Brown	DT	6'4/285	Virginia	

== Game summary ==
=== Scoring summary ===
Scoring summary

Quarter	Time	Drive			Team	Scoring information	Score	
Quarter	Time	Plays	Yards	TOP	Team	Scoring information	North	South
1	8:56	6	82	2:33	South	Tre'Quan Smith 14-yard touchdown reception from Mike White, Daniel Carlson kick good	0	7
1	4:44	10	43	4:11	North	50-yard field goal by Michael Badgley	3	7
1	0:00	5	20	0:23	South	53-yard field goal by Daniel Carlson	3	10
2	12:35	3	71	0:53	South	Rashaad Penny 73-yard touchdown reception from Kurt Benkert, 2-point run good by Ito Smith†	3	18
3	8:25	11	81	6:35	North	Tyler Conklin 16-yard touchdown reception from Josh Allen, Michael Badgley kick good	10	18
3	6:09	2	58	0:39	North	Durham Smythe 27-yard touchdown reception from Josh Allen, 2-point pass failed	16	18
3	5:58	1	75	0:08	South	D. J. Chark 75-yard touchdown reception from Kyle Lauletta, Daniel Carlson kick good	16	25
3	0:41	9	95	3:11	South	Deon Yelder 1-yard touchdown reception from Kyle Lauletta, Daniel Carlson kick good	16	32
3	0:33				South	Marcus Davenport 19-yard fumble return, Daniel Carlson kick failed	16	38
4	10:39	10	75	4:28	South	Marcell Ateman 14-yard touchdown reception from Kyle Lauletta, Daniel Carlson kick good	16	45
"TOP" = time of possession. For other American football terms, see Glossary of American football.							16	45

Note: special playing rules detailed here.
† Senior Bowl rules require teams to attempt 2-point conversions during the 2nd quarter.

=== Statistics ===
Statistics	North	South
First downs	19	19
Rushes-yards	36-147	30-115
Passing yards	253	425
Passes, Comp-Att-Int	20-39-1	21-36-1
Return yards	86	39
Punts-average	7-41.6	6-48.7
Fumbles-lost	2-2	1-0
Penalties-yards	2-15	2-10
Time of Possession	31:17	28:43
