= Chris Frey Jr. =

American gridiron football player (born 1995)

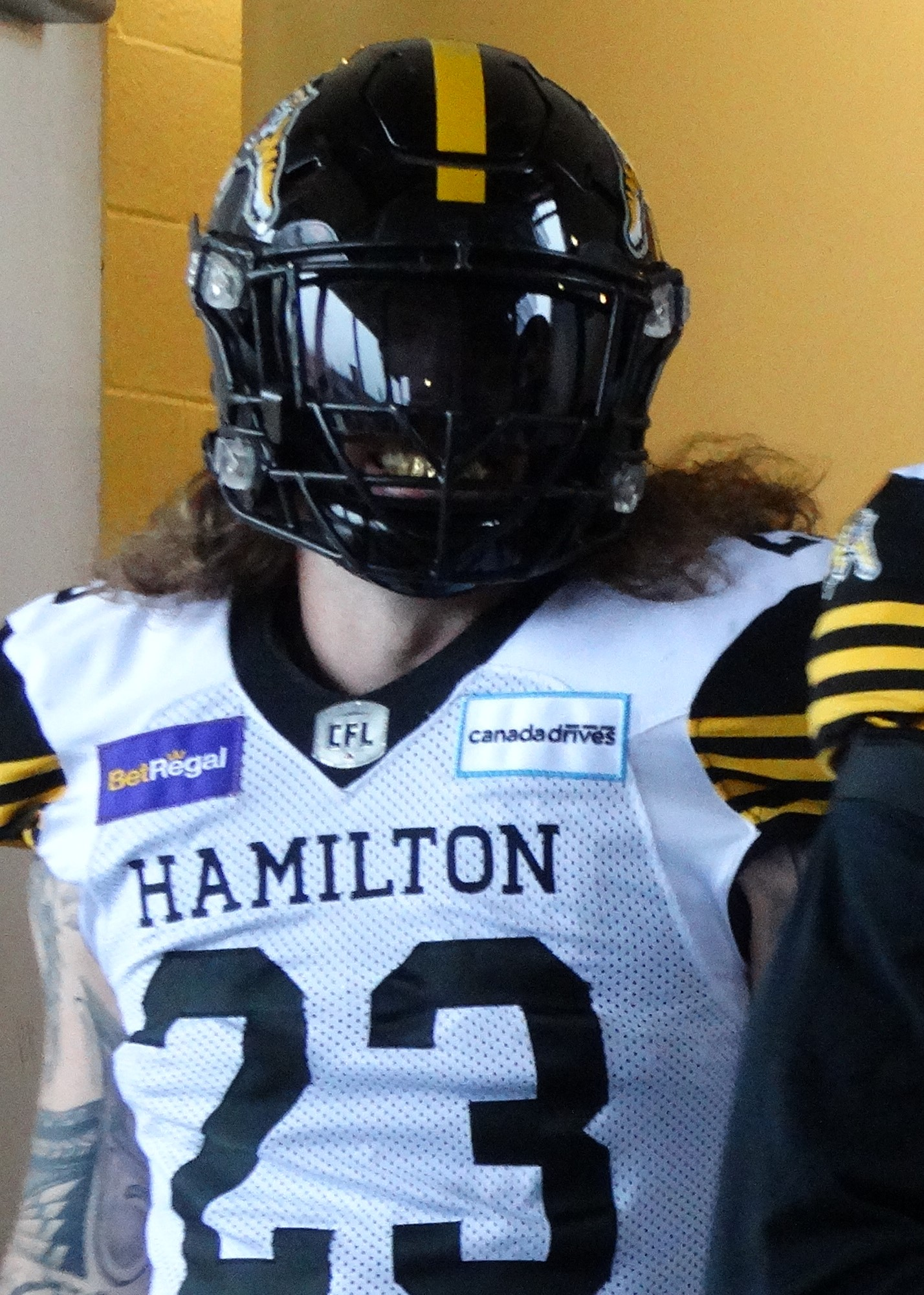
- Frey with the Hamilton Tiger-Cats in 2021

No. 23,44
- Position: Linebacker

Personal information
- Born: June 23, 1995 (age 31); Upper Arlington, Ohio, U.S.
- Listed height: 6 ft 0 in (1.83 m)
- Listed weight: 203 lb (92 kg)

Career information
- High school: Upper Arlington
- College: Michigan State (2014–2017)

Career history
- 2018: Carolina Panthers*
- 2019–2021: Hamilton Tiger-Cats
- 2022: New Orleans Breakers
- * Offseason or practice squad member only

Awards and highlights
- Holiday Bowl MVP (2017); Big Ten (2015)
- Stats at CFL.ca

Chris Frey Jr. (born June 23, 1995) is an American former professional football player who was a linebacker for the Hamilton Tiger-Cats of the Canadian Football League (CFL). He was also a member of the Carolina Panthers and New Orleans Breakers. He played college football for the Michigan State Spartans.

== College career ==
Frey played college football for the Spartans at Michigan State University from 2014 to 2017. He played in 52 games where he had 193 tackles, 13.5 tackles for a loss, seven sacks, and five fumble recoveries.

=== College statistics ===
Year	Team	GP	Tackles					Fumbles			
Year	Team	GP	Solo	Ast	Tol	Loss	Sk	Fr	Yds	TD	FF
2014	Michigan State	10	8	11	19	0.0	0.0	1	0	0	0
2015	Michigan State	13	12	11	23	5.0	2.5	1	0	0	0
2016	Michigan State	12	40	56	96	4.0	0.5	0	0	0	1
2017	Michigan State	13	25	30	55	4.5	4.0	3	0	0	1
Career		48	85	108	193	13.5	7.0	5	0	0	2

== Professional career ==
=== Carolina Panthers ===
Frey signed with the Carolina Panthers as an undrafted free agent on April 29, 2018. However, he was released with the final cuts following training camp on September 1, 2018.

=== Hamilton Tiger-Cats ===
Frey signed with the Hamilton Tiger-Cats on January 24, 2019. He made the team's active roster following training camp and played in his first career professional game on June 13, 2019, against the Saskatchewan Roughriders. He played in five regular season games where he had three defensive tackles, two special teams tackles, and one sack.

Frey did not play in 2020 due to the cancellation of the 2020 CFL season and signed a contract extension with the Tiger-Cats on January 5, 2021. He played in four regular season games in 2021 where he had two defensive tackles and three special teams tackles. Frey played in two Grey Cup with the Tiger-Cats in 2019, and in 2021. He became a free agent upon the expiry of his contract on February 8, 2022.

=== New Orleans Breakers ===
Frey signed with the New Orleans Breakers of the United States Football League on May 10, 2022. He was released on June 8.

== Personal life ==
Frey is now a Firefighter/Paramedic at the City of Whitehall Division of Fire, a suburb of Columbus, Ohio.
