= Hilinski =

Hilinski is a Slavic surname. Notable people with the surname include:

- Ryan Hilinski (born 2000), American football player
- Tyler Hilinski (1996–2018), American football player
