= 2018 East–West Shrine Game =

- All–Star Bowl Game
| East Team | West Team |
| 10 | 14 |
| Head coach: Jonathan Hayes (Cincinnati Bengals) | Head coach: Bobby Johnson (Oakland Raiders) |
| | 1 | 2 | 3 | 4 | Total |
|---|---|---|---|---|---|
| East | 0 | 3 | 7 | 0 | 10 |
| West | 7 | 0 | 0 | 7 | 14 |
- Date: January 20, 2018
- Season: 2017
- Stadium: Tropicana Field
- Location: St. Petersburg, Florida
- MVP: Daurice Fountain (WR, Northern Iowa) & Natrell Jamerson (S, Wisconsin)
- Referee: Jeff Heaser
- Attendance: 20,000

United States TV coverage
- Network: NFL Network
- Announcers: Andrew Siciliano (play-by-play), Mike Mayock (color), Daniel Jeremiah (color), Alex Flanagan (sideline)

The 2018 East–West Shrine Game was the 93rd staging of the all–star college football exhibition to benefit Shriners Hospital for Children. The game was played at Tropicana Field in St. Petersburg, Florida, on January 20, 2018, with a 3:07 p.m. EST kickoff; televised on the NFL Network. It was one of the final 2017–18 bowl games concluding the 2017 FBS football season. The game featured NCAA players (predominantly from the Football Bowl Subdivision) and a few select invitees from Canadian university football, rostered into "East" and "West" teams.

The game featured more than 100 players from the 2017 NCAA Division I FBS football season and prospects for the 2018 draft of the professional National Football League (NFL). In the week prior to the game, scouts from all 32 NFL teams attended team practices.

Coaches and game officials were supplied by the NFL. Head coaches in the game were assistant coaches with NFL teams who did not advance to the postseason; Jonathan Hayes of the Cincinnati Bengals for the East team, and Bobby Johnson of the Oakland Raiders for the West team.

The day before the game, the East–West Shrine Game Pat Tillman Award was given to J. T. Barrett (QB, Ohio State); the award "is presented to a player who best exemplifies character, intelligence, sportsmanship and service. The award is about a student-athlete's achievements and conduct, both on and off the field."

== Coaching staffs ==
=== East team ===
| Coach | NFL team | Role |
|---|---|---|
| Jonathan Hayes | Cincinnati Bengals | Head coach |
| Richard Angulo | Baltimore Ravens | Offensive line |
| Dave Borgonzi | Tampa Bay Buccaneers | Defensive coordinator |
| Bobby Engram | Baltimore Ravens | Offensive coordinator |
| Skyler Fulton | Tampa Bay Buccaneers | Special teams |
| Zack Grossi | Tampa Bay Buccaneers | Quarterbacks |
| Cannon Matthews | Washington Redskins | Linebackers |
| Dan Pitcher | Cincinnati Bengals | Wide receivers |
| James Rowe III | Washington Redskins | Defensive backs |
| Chad Wade | Tampa Bay Buccaneers | Strength & conditioning |
| Andrew Weidinger | Tampa Bay Buccaneers | Tight ends |
| Drew Wilkins | Baltimore Ravens | Defensive line |
| Omar Young | Green Bay Packers | Running backs |

=== West team ===
| Coach | NFL team | Role |
|---|---|---|
| Bobby Johnson | Oakland Raiders | Head coach |
| Danny Breyer | Tampa Bay Buccaneers | Linebackers |
| Robert Couch | Cincinnati Bengals | Tight ends |
| Will Harriger | Seattle Seahawks | Offensive coordinator |
| Chris Harris | Los Angeles Chargers | Defensive coordinator |
| Marcus Lewis | Cincinnati Bengals | Defensive line |
| D’Anton Lynn | Los Angeles Chargers | Defensive backs |
| David Raih | Green Bay Packers | Quarterbacks |
| Mark Ridgley | Los Angeles Chargers | Running backs |
| Pat Ruel | Seattle Seahawks | Offensive line |
| Dan Shamash | Los Angeles Chargers | Wide receivers |
| Joe Vaugh | Tampa Bay Buccaneers | Strength & conditioning |
| Marquice Williams | Los Angeles Chargers | Special teams |

== Players ==
Full roster is available here.

=== East team ===
Selected players are listed below. Full roster on the official website.

| No. | Pos. | Player | College | 2017 season bowl game | Notes |
|---|---|---|---|---|---|
| 1 | QB | Riley Ferguson | Memphis | Liberty Bowl | |
| 5 | WR | DaeSean Hamilton | Penn State | Fiesta Bowl | Subsequently, invited to the 2018 Senior Bowl |
| 6 | LB | Matthew Thomas | Florida State | none† | Thomas was injured and did not play |
| 7 | RB | Ralph Webb | Vanderbilt | none | |
| 9 | QB | Quinton Flowers | South Florida | Birmingham Bowl | |
| 10 | WR | Daurice Fountain | Northern Iowa | n/a (DI FCS) | Fountain was named the game's Offensive MVP |
| 16 | QB | J. T. Barrett | Ohio State | Cotton Bowl | |
| 22 | RB | Chase Edmonds | Fordham | n/a (DI FCS) | Edmonds was injured and did not play |
| 23 | RB | D'Ernest Johnson | South Florida | Birmingham Bowl | |
| 25 | WR | Justin Watson | Penn | n/a (DI FCS) | Subsequently, invited to the 2018 Senior Bowl |
| 27 | K | Drew Brown | Nebraska | none | |
| 33 | DE | Marcus Martin | Slippery Rock | n/a (Division II) | Martin caught a touchdown pass, playing at fullback |
| 35 | RB | Ray Lawry | Old Dominion | none | |
| 40 | LB | Jason Cabinda | Penn State | Fiesta Bowl | |
| 49 | P | Joseph Davidson | Bowling Green | none | |
| 50 | G | Tony Adams | NC State | Sun Bowl | |
| 57 | C | Austin Kuhnert | North Dakota State | n/a (DI FCS) | |
| 62 | T | K. C. McDermott | Miami (FL) | Orange Bowl | |
| 64 | C | Brian Allen | Michigan State | Holiday Bowl | |
| 83 | WR | Regis Cibasu | Montreal | n/a (RSEQ) | Canadian invitee |
| 99 | DE | Chad Thomas | Miami (FL) | Orange Bowl | Subsequently, invited to the 2018 Senior Bowl |

† Matthew Thomas opted not to play in the Independence Bowl

=== West team ===
Selected players are listed below. Full roster on the official website.

| No. | Pos. | Player | College | 2017 season bowl game | Notes |
|---|---|---|---|---|---|
| 2 | LB | Joel Lanning | Iowa State | Liberty Bowl | |
| 6 | QB | Jeremiah Briscoe | Sam Houston State | n/a (DI FCS) | |
| 7 | QB | Nick Stevens | Colorado State | New Mexico Bowl | |
| 12 | S | Natrell Jamerson | Wisconsin | Orange Bowl | Jamerson was named the game's Defensive MVP |
| 15 | K | Matt McCrane | Kansas State | Cactus Bowl | |
| 16 | QB | Nic Shimonek | Texas Tech | Birmingham Bowl | |
| 18 | P | Shane Tripucka | Texas A&M | Belk Bowl | Grandson of Frank Tripucka, nephew of Kelly Tripucka |
| 21 | RB | Justin Jackson | Northwestern | Music City Bowl | |
| 23 | RB | Phillip Lindsay | Colorado | none | |
| 31 | CB | Malik Reaves | Villanova | n/a (DI FCS) | |
| 38 | RB | Jordan Chunn | Troy | New Orleans Bowl | |
| 48 | LB | Tegray Scales | Indiana | none | |
| 65 | OT | Mark Korte | Alberta | n/a (Canada West) | Canadian invitee |
| 75 | G | Jacob Alsadek | Arizona | Foster Farms Bowl | |
| 76 | G | Cody O'Connell | Washington State | Holiday Bowl | |
| 85 | WR | Steven Dunbar Jr. | Houston | Hawaii Bowl | |
| 95 | DT | Poona Ford | Texas | Texas Bowl | Subsequently, invited to the 2018 Senior Bowl |

== Game summary ==
=== Scoring summary ===
Scoring summary

| Quarter | Time | Drive | | | Team | Scoring information | Score | |
| Quarter | Time | Plays | Yards | TOP | Team | Scoring information | East | West |
|---|---|---|---|---|---|---|---|---|
| 1 | 2:42 | | | | West | Fumble recovery returned 68 yards for touchdown by Natrell Jamerson, Matthew McCrane kick good | 0 | 7 |
| 2 | 0:03 | 9 | 64 | 1:39 | East | 33-yard field goal by Drew Brown | 3 | 7 |
| 3 | 1:57 | 7 | 30 | 3:44 | East | Marcus Martin 4-yard touchdown reception from J. T. Barrett, Drew Brown kick good | 10 | 7 |
| 4 | 1:23 | 10 | 70 | 4:09 | West | Steven Dunbar 34-yard touchdown reception from Nic Shimonek, Matthew McCrane kick good | 10 | 14 |
| "TOP" = time of possession. For other American football terms, see Glossary of American football. | | | | | | | 10 | 14 |

=== Statistics ===
| Statistics | East | West |
|---|---|---|
| First downs | 13 | 17 |
| Rushes-yards | 26-106 | 31-112 |
| Passing yards | 132 | 149 |
| Passes, Comp-Att-Int | 9-24-0 | 17-31-0 |
| Return yards | 72 | 30 |
| Punts-average | 7-48.4 | 6-37.7 |
| Fumbles-lost | 2-1 | 1-1 |
| Penalties-yards | 5-55 | 5-40 |
| Time of Possession | 26:19 | 33:41 |

== See also ==
- 2018 NFL draft
