= Chad Thomas =

American football player (born 1995)

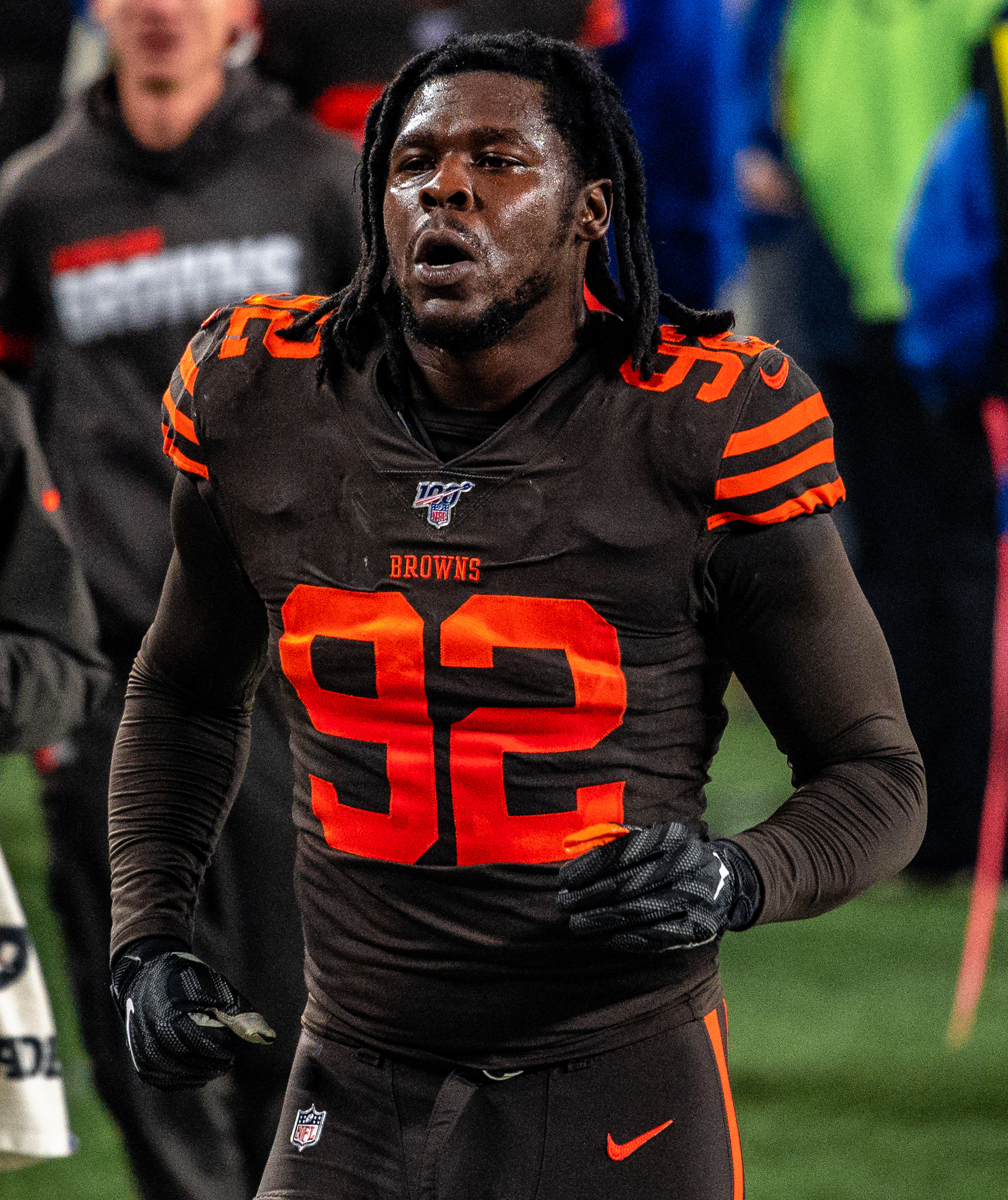
- Thomas with the Cleveland Browns in 2019

No. 92
- Position: Defensive end

Personal information
- Born: October 12, 1995 (age 31); Miami, Florida, U.S.
- Listed height: 6 ft 5 in (1.96 m)
- Listed weight: 278 lb (126 kg)

Career information
- High school: Booker T. Washington (Miami)
- College: Miami (FL)
- NFL draft: 2018: 3rd round, 67th overall pick

Career history
- Cleveland Browns (2018–2019)

Career NFL statistics
- Total tackles: 26
- Sacks: 4
- Pass deflections: 1
- Stats at Pro Football Reference

Chad Thomas (born October 12, 1995), also known as Major Nine, is an American rapper and former professional football player. He played as a defensive end for the Cleveland Browns of the National Football League (NFL). Thomas played college football for the Miami Hurricanes and was selected by the Browns in the third round of the 2018 NFL draft.

== Early life ==
Thomas led Booker T. Washington High School to the Class 4A state title as junior in 2012 and class 4A state champs as senior in 2013. He recorded 57 tackles and six sacks in 2012. He was named 2013 second-team All-USA by USA Today and tallied 71 tackles and eight sacks as senior. After high school, Thomas chose Miami over Alabama, Florida State, Arkansas and Duke.

== College career ==
Thomas started every game as a senior, recording 41 tackles, 12.5 for a loss (leading the team) and 5.5 sacks.

== Professional career ==
On December 27, 2017, it was announced that Thomas had accepted his invitation to play in the 2018 East-West Shrine Game. He had a productive week of practice and separated himself as the top defensive end prospect playing in the East-West Shrine Game. On January 20, 2017, Thomas made one tackle as part of the East who lost 14–10 to the West in the 2018 East-West Shrine Game. His overall performance during the week garnered him an invitation to the 2018 Senior Bowl. Thomas also impressed scouts and team representatives during practices for the Senior Bowl, but was unable to play in the game due to an unspecified injury. Thomas attended the NFL Scouting Combine in Indianapolis and completed the majority of drills, but opted to skip the bench press, short shuttle, and three-cone drill.

External videos
- Chad Thomas' NFL Combine Workout
- NFL Draft Profile: Chad Thomas

On March 28, 2018, Thomas participated at Miami's pro day and performed the 40-yard dash (4.78s), 20-yard dash (2.81s), 10-yard dash (1.74s), vertical jump (32.5"), broad jump (9'10"), short shuttle (4.83s), and three-cone drill (7.36s). At the conclusion of the pre-draft process, Thomas' draft projections varied from as early as the third or fourth rounds to as late as the sixth or seventh rounds by NFL draft experts and scouts. He was ranked as the 14th best defensive end in the draft by Scouts Inc. and was ranked the 19th best defensive end by DraftScout.com.

Pre-draft measurables
Height	Weight	Arm length	Hand span	40-yard dash	10-yard split	20-yard split	20-yard shuttle	Three-cone drill	Vertical jump	Broad jump
6 ft 5 in (1.96 m)	281 lb (127 kg)	33 1/2 in (0.85 m)	10 1/4 in (0.26 m)	4.92 s	1.70 s	2.85 s	4.83 s	7.36 s	29 in (0.74 m)	9 ft 8 in (2.95 m)
All values from NFL Combine

The Cleveland Browns selected Thomas in the third round (67th overall) of the 2018 NFL draft. He was the sixth defensive end drafted in 2018. On May 21, 2018, the Browns signed Thomas to a four-year, $4.08 million contract that includes a signing bonus of $1.04 million. He was waived by the Browns on September 5, 2020.

External videos
- Browns draft Chad Thomas 67th overall
- First Draft: Chad Thomas

== Music career ==
Thomas is also a music producer and rapper, known as Major Nine. Thomas has worked with Rick Ross, Raphael Saadiq, and has produced his own music. In 2020, he appeared on Chris Brown and Young Thug's mixtape Slime & B, on the track "Trap Back".
