= 2017 Michigan State Spartans football team =

American college football season

2017 Michigan State Spartans football

Holiday Bowl champion

Holiday Bowl, W 42–17 vs. Washington State
- Conference: Big Ten Conference
- East Division

Ranking
- Coaches: No. 16
- AP: No. 15
- Record: 10–3 (7–2 Big Ten)
- Head coach: Mark Dantonio (11th season)
- Co-offensive coordinators: Dave Warner (5th season); Jim Bollman (5th season)
- Offensive scheme: Pro-style
- Co-defensive coordinators: Harlon Barnett (3rd season); Mike Tressel (3rd season)
- Base defense: Multiple
- Captains: Brian Allen; Chris Frey
- Home stadium: Spartan Stadium

2017 Big Ten Conference football standings
	Conf.			Overall
Team	W		L	W		L
East Division
No. 5 Ohio State xy$	8	–	1	12	–	2
No. 15 Michigan State	7	–	2	10	–	3
No. 8 Penn State	7	–	2	11	–	2
Michigan	5	–	4	8	–	5
Rutgers	3	–	6	4	–	8
Indiana	2	–	7	5	–	7
Maryland	2	–	7	4	–	8
West Division
No. 7 Wisconsin xy	9	–	0	13	–	1
No. 17 Northwestern	7	–	2	10	–	3
Iowa	4	–	5	8	–	5
Purdue	4	–	5	7	–	6
Nebraska	3	–	6	4	–	8
Minnesota	2	–	7	5	–	7
Illinois	0	–	9	2	–	10
Championship: Ohio State 27, Wisconsin 21
$ – Conference champion; x – Division champion/co-champions; y – Championship game participant; Rankings from AP Poll

The 2017 Michigan State Spartans football team represented Michigan State University in the 2017 NCAA Division I FBS football season. The Spartans played their home games at the Spartan Stadium in East Lansing, Michigan, and competed in the East Division of the Big Ten Conference. They were led by 11th-year head coach Mark Dantonio. The Spartans finished the season 10–3, 7–2 in Big Ten play to finish in a tie for second place in the East Division. The Spartans received an invitation to the Holiday Bowl where they defeated Washington State.

== Offseason ==
=== 2017 NFL draft ===
Round	Pick	Team	Player	Position
2	35	Seattle Seahawks	Malik McDowell	Defensive Lineman
4	123	Washington Redskins	Montae Nicholson	Safety

=== Undrafted NFL free agents ===
Team	Player	Position
Tampa Bay Buccaneers	Riley Bullough	Linebacker
Minnesota Vikings	R.J. Shelton	Wide receiver
Minnesota Vikings	Josiah Price	Tight End
Cincinnati Bengals	Tyler O'Connor	Quarterback
Cincinnati Bengals	Demetrious Cox	Safety
Arizona Cardinals	Brandon Clemons	Offensive/Defensive Lineman
Arizona Cardinals	Kodi Kieler	Offensive lineman

=== Dismissals due to sexual assault incidents ===
The Spartans dismissed three players, Donnie Corley, Josh King, and Demetric Vance, after they were charged with third-degree criminal sexual conduct in relation to a sexual assault investigation. In a separate incident, Auston Robertson, was charged with third-degree sexual misconduct in April and dismissed from the team.

=== Recruiting ===
The Spartans signed a total of 23 recruits.

College recruiting (2017)
Name	Hometown	School	Height	Weight	Commit date
Cody White; WR	Walled Lake, Michigan	Walled Lake Western HS	6 ft 3 in (1.91 m)	190 lb (86 kg)	Mar 16, 2016
Cody White; WR	Recruit ratings: Scout: Rivals: 247Sports: ESPN:				
Jack Camper; TE	Virginia Beach, Virginia	IMG Academy	6 ft 6 in (1.98 m)	230 lb (100 kg)	Mar 22, 2016
Jack Camper; TE	Recruit ratings: Scout: Rivals: 247Sports: ESPN:				
Kevin Jarvis; OG	Park Ridge, Illinois	Maine South HS	6 ft 5 in (1.96 m)	340 lb (150 kg)	Mar 31, 2016
Kevin Jarvis; OG	Recruit ratings: Scout: Rivals: 247Sports: ESPN:				
Hunter Rison; WR	Ann Arbor, Michigan	Skyline HS	5 ft 11 in (1.80 m)	197 lb (89 kg)	Apr 1, 2016
Hunter Rison; WR	Recruit ratings: Scout: Rivals: 247Sports: ESPN:				
Rocky Lombardi; QB	West Des Moines, Iowa	Valley HS	6 ft 3 in (1.91 m)	200 lb (91 kg)	Apr 3, 2016
Rocky Lombardi; QB	Recruit ratings: Scout: Rivals: 247Sports: ESPN:				
Matt Carrick; OG	Massillon, Ohio	Perry HS	6 ft 4 in (1.93 m)	275 lb (125 kg)	Apr 20, 2016
Matt Carrick; OG	Recruit ratings: Scout: Rivals: 247Sports: ESPN:				
Darien Clemons; LB	Piqua, Ohio	Piqua HS	6 ft 1 in (1.85 m)	214 lb (97 kg)	Apr 26, 2016
Darien Clemons; LB	Recruit ratings: Scout: Rivals: 247Sports: ESPN:				
Weston Bridges; RB	Akron, Ohio	Copley HS	6 ft 0 in (1.83 m)	204 lb (93 kg)	Apr 27, 2016
Weston Bridges; RB	Recruit ratings: Scout: Rivals: 247Sports: ESPN:				
Jacob Panasiuk; DE	Roselle, Illinois	Lake Park HS	6 ft 3 in (1.91 m)	266 lb (121 kg)	Jun 2, 2016
Jacob Panasiuk; DE	Recruit ratings: Scout: Rivals: 247Sports: ESPN:				
Lashawn Paulino-Bell; DE	Fort Lauderdale, Florida	St. Thomas Aquinas HS	6 ft 4 in (1.93 m)	235 lb (107 kg)	Jun 20, 2016
Lashawn Paulino-Bell; DE	Recruit ratings: Scout: Rivals: 247Sports: ESPN:				
Mustafa Khaleefah; OT	Dearborn, Michigan	Dearborn HS	6 ft 6 in (1.98 m)	282 lb (128 kg)	Jun 23, 2016
Mustafa Khaleefah; OT	Recruit ratings: Scout: Rivals: 247Sports: ESPN:				
Dominique Long; S	Westerville, Ohio	Westerville South HS	6 ft 2 in (1.88 m)	189 lb (86 kg)	Jun 25, 2016
Dominique Long; S	Recruit ratings: Scout: Rivals: 247Sports: ESPN:				
Matt Dotson; TE	Cincinnati, Ohio	Moeller HS	6 ft 5 in (1.96 m)	235 lb (107 kg)	Jul 7, 2016
Matt Dotson; TE	Recruit ratings: Scout: Rivals: 247Sports: ESPN:				
Jordan Reid; OG	Detroit, Michigan	Cass Tech HS	6 ft 5 in (1.96 m)	300 lb (140 kg)	Jul 9, 2016
Jordan Reid; OG	Recruit ratings: Scout: Rivals: 247Sports: ESPN:				
Josiah Scott; CB	Fairfield, Ohio	Fairfield HS	6 ft 2 in (1.88 m)	235 lb (107 kg)	Jul 31, 2016
Josiah Scott; CB	Recruit ratings: Scout: Rivals: 247Sports: ESPN:				
Connor Heyward; WR	Suwanee, Georgia	Peachtree Ridge HS	6 ft 2 in (1.88 m)	215 lb (98 kg)	Dec 8, 2016
Connor Heyward; WR	Recruit ratings: Scout: Rivals: 247Sports: ESPN:				
Antjuan Simmons; LB	Ann Arbor, Michigan	Pioneer HS	6 ft 1 in (1.85 m)	215 lb (98 kg)	Jan 14, 2017
Antjuan Simmons; LB	Recruit ratings: Scout: Rivals: 247Sports: ESPN:				
Tre Person; CB	Atlanta, Georgia	Westlake HS	6 ft 0 in (1.83 m)	165 lb (75 kg)	Jan 22, 2017
Tre Person; CB	Recruit ratings: Scout: Rivals: 247Sports: ESPN:				
DeAri Todd; DE	Lorain, Ohio	Clearview HS	6 ft 4 in (1.93 m)	245 lb (111 kg)	Jan 22, 2017
DeAri Todd; DE	Recruit ratings: Scout: Rivals: 247Sports: ESPN:				
C.J. Hayes; WR	Bowling Green, Kentucky	South Warren HS	6 ft 3 in (1.91 m)	200 lb (91 kg)	Jan 31, 2017
C.J. Hayes; WR	Recruit ratings: Scout: Rivals: 247Sports: ESPN:				
Noah Harvey; LB	Hartland, Wisconsin	Arrowhead HS	6 ft 3 in (1.91 m)	210 lb (95 kg)	Jan 31, 2017
Noah Harvey; LB	Recruit ratings: Scout: Rivals: 247Sports: ESPN:				
Emmanuel Flowers; S	Chino Hills, California	Ayala HS	6 ft 1 in (1.85 m)	175 lb (79 kg)	Feb 1, 2017
Emmanuel Flowers; S	Recruit ratings: Scout: Rivals: 247Sports: ESPN:				
Laress Nelson; WR	Plantation, Florida	American Heritage HS	5 ft 10 in (1.78 m)	171 lb (78 kg)	Feb 1, 2017
Laress Nelson; WR	Recruit ratings: Scout: Rivals: 247Sports: ESPN:				
Overall recruit ranking:
Note: In many cases, Scout, Rivals, 247Sports, On3, and ESPN may conflict in their listings of height and weight.; In these cases, the average was taken. ESPN grades are on a 100-point scale.; Sources: "Michigan State Football Commitments". Rivals.; "2017 Michigan State Football Commits". Scout.; "ESPN". ESPN.; "Scout.com Team Recruiting Rankings". Scout.; "2017 Team Ranking". Rivals.com.

== Roster ==
2017 Michigan State Spartans football team roster
Players
Coaches
Offense

Pos.	#	Name	Class
RB	3	LJ Scott	Jr
WR	4	C. J. Hayes	Fr
WR	5	Hunter Rison	Fr
QB	6	Damion Terry	Sr
WR	7	Cody White	Fr
QB	10	Messiah deWeaver	Fr
RB	11	Connor Heyward	Fr
QB	12	Rocky Lombardi	Fr
QB	13	Mickey Macius	Jr
QB	14	Brian Lewerke	So
WR	16	Brandon Sowards	Jr
WR	17	Laress Nelson	Fr
WR	18	Felton Davis III	Jr
WR	19	Nick Krumm	So
WR	20	David Lewandowski	So
WR	21	Cam Chambers	Fr
RB	24	Gerald Holmes	Sr
WR	25	Darrell Stewart Jr.	So
RB	27	Weston Bridges	Fr
RB	28	Madre London	Jr
FB	30	Tanner Hallock	Fr
FB	40	Collin Lucas	Jr
FB	41	Reid Burton	Fr
TE	42	Hussien Kadry	Sr
FB	44	Max Rosenthal	Fr
FB	45	Joe Palange	Sr
OT	55	Jordan Reid	Fr
G	56	Matt Carrick	Fr
G	59	David Beedle	Jr
G	60	Casey Schreiner	Jr
OT	61	Cole Chewins	So
OT	62	Luke Campbell	Fr
OT	63	Noah Listermann	So
OL	64	Matt Allen	Fr
OL	65	Brian Allen (C)	Sr
OT	66	Blake Bueter	Fr
C	67	Bryce Wilker	So
OL	68	Jeremy Schram	Jr
OL	69	Tommy Liesveld	Fr
G	70	Tyler Higby	So
OL	71	Chase Gianacakos	Jr
OT	73	Dennis Finley	Sr
OL	74	Jack Henrichs	Fr
G	75	Kevin Jarvis	Fr
OT	76	A. J. Arcuri	Fr
OL	77	Nick Padla	Jr
OT	79	Mustafa Khaleefah	Fr
TE	80	Matt Seybert	So
TE	81	Matt Sokol	Jr
TE	82	Jack Camper	Fr
WR	83	Noah Sargent	Fr
WR	84	Brock Makaric	Sr
TE	84	Noah Davis	Fr
WR	85	Khylin Barton	Fr
WR	86	Trishton Jackson	So
WR	88	Andre Welch	Fr
TE	89	Matt Dotson	Fr

Defense

Pos.	#	Name	Class
CB, WR	2	Justin Layne	So
LB	5	Andrew Dowell	Jr
DE	8	Lashawn Paulino-Bell	Fr
S	9	Dominique Long	Fr
S	10	Matt Morrissey	Jr
CB	15	Emmanuel Flowers	Fr
CB	15	Tyson Smith	Jr
S	16	Austin Andrews	Fr
LB	17	Tyriq Thompson	So
CB	19	Josh Butler	So
S	20	Jalen Watts-Jackson	Jr
CB	22	Josiah Scott	Fr
LB	23	Chris Frey (C)	Sr
CB	24	Tre Person	Fr
DE	26	Brandon Randle	Fr
S	27	Khari Willis	Jr
S	28	David Dowell	So
DB	29	Shakur Brown	Fr
CB	31	T. J. Harrell	Jr
DB	32	Jahz Watts	Fr
LB	34	Antjuan Simmons	Fr
LB	35	Joe Bachie	So
LB	37	Dante Razzano	Fr
DB	37	Corey Pryor	Fr
LB	38	Byron Bullough	Jr
DL	41	Gerald Owens	Jr
LB	42	Brent Mossburg	Fr
S	43	Jack Mandryk	Fr
S	44	Grayson Miller	Jr
LB	45	Darien Tipps-Clemons	Fr
LB	47	Noah Harvey	Fr
DE	48	Kenny Willekes	So
LB	49	Shane Jones	Sr
LB	50	Sean Harrington	Sr
DL	51	Kyonta Stallworth	So
DE	52	Dillon Alexander	Jr
LB	53	Peter Fisk	Fr
LB	54	Mitchell Sokol	Fr
DT	58	Devyn Salmon	Sr
DT	72	Mike Panasiuk	So
DE	83	Mufi Hill-Hunt	Fr
DE	91	Robert Bowers	Jr
DE	92	DeAri Todd	Fr
DT	93	Naquan Jones	Fr
DE	96	Jacub Panasiuk	Fr
DE	97	Justice Alexander	So
DE	98	Demetrius Cooper	Sr
DT	99	Raequan Williams	So

Special teams

Pos.	#	Name	Class
K	8	Cole Hahn	Fr
P	25	Jake Hartbarger	Jr
LS	47	Ryan Armour	So
LS	57	Collin Caflisch	So
K, P	94	Jack McKenna	Fr
K	97	Brett Scanlon	Sr
K	98	Matt Coghlin	Fr

Head coach

- Mark Dantonio

Coordinators/assistant coaches

- Harlon Barnett (Associate head coach/co-Defensive coordinator/Defensive Backs)
- Mark Staten (Assistant head coach/Offensive Line)
- Jim Bollman (Co-Offensive Coordinator/Tight Ends)
- Mike Tressel (Co-Defensive coordinator/Linebackers)
- Dave Warner (Co-Offensive Coordinator/Running Backs)
- Ron Burton (Defensive Tackles)
- Brad Salem (Quarterbacks)
- Terrence Samuel (Wide Receivers)
- Mark Snyder (Defensive Ends/Special Teams)

Legend

- (C) Team captain
- (S) Suspended
- (I) Ineligible
- Injured
- Redshirt

Roster
Last update: August 8, 2017

== Coaching staff ==
Name	Position	Joined Staff
Mark Dantonio	Head coach	2007
Harlon Barnett	Associate head coach/Co-Defensive coordinator/Defensive Backs	2007
Mark Staten	Assistant head coach/offensive line	2007
Dave Warner	Co-Offensive Coordinator/Running Backs	2007
Jim Bollman	Co-Offensive Coordinator/Tight Ends	2013
Mike Tressel	Co-Defensive coordinator/linebackers	2007
Brad Salem	Quarterbacks	2010
Terrence Samuel	Wide receivers	2011
Ron Burton	Defensive Tackles	2013
Mark Snyder	Defensive Ends/Special Teams	2015

== Schedule ==
Michigan State announced its 2017 football schedule on December 8, 2016.

Date	Time	Opponent	Rank	Site	TV	Result	Attendance
September 2	12:00 p.m.	Bowling Green*		Spartan Stadium; East Lansing, MI	ESPNU	W 35–10	71,202
September 9	3:30 p.m.	Western Michigan*		Spartan Stadium; East Lansing, MI	BTN	W 28–14	72,910
September 23	8:00 p.m.	Notre Dame*		Spartan Stadium; East Lansing, MI (rivalry)	FOX	L 18–38	74,023
September 30	3:30 p.m.	Iowa		Spartan Stadium; East Lansing, MI	FOX	W 17–10	73,331
October 7	7:30 p.m.	at No. 7 Michigan		Michigan Stadium; Ann Arbor, MI (rivalry)	ABC	W 14–10	112,432
October 14	8:00 p.m.	at Minnesota	No. 21	TCF Bank Stadium; Minneapolis, MN	BTN	W 30–27	47,541
October 21	3:30 p.m.	Indiana^{†}	No. 18	Spartan Stadium; East Lansing, MI (rivalry)	ABC	W 17–9	74,111
October 28	3:30 p.m.	at Northwestern	No. 16	Ryan Field; Evanston, IL	ESPN	L 31–39 ^{3OT}	39,369
November 4	12:00 p.m.	No. 7 Penn State	No. 24	Spartan Stadium; East Lansing, MI (rivalry)	FOX	W 27–24	71,605
November 11	12:00 p.m.	at No. 13 Ohio State	No. 12	Ohio Stadium; Columbus, OH	FOX	L 3–48	107,011
November 18	4:00 p.m.	Maryland	No. 17	Spartan Stadium; East Lansing, MI	FOX	W 17–7	70,216
November 25	4:00 p.m.	at Rutgers	No. 16	High Point Solutions Stadium; Piscataway, NJ	FOX	W 40–7	35,021
December 28	9:00 p.m.	vs. No. 18 Washington State*	No. 16	Qualcomm Stadium; San Diego, CA (Holiday Bowl)	FS1	W 42–17	47,092
*Non-conference game; ^{†}Homecoming; Rankings from AP Poll and CFP Rankings after October 31 released prior to game; All times are in Eastern time

== Game summaries ==
=== Bowling Green ===
Week One: Bowling Green at Michigan State – Game summary

Quarter	1	2	3	4	Total
Bowling Green	3	0	0	7	10
Michigan State	0	14	21	0	35

at Spartan Stadium, East Lansing, MI

- Date: September 2, 2017
- Game time: 12:01 pm EDT
- Game weather: 65 °F (18 °C), Wind: 7 MPH ESE, Sunny
- Game attendance: 71,202
- Referee: Jeff Servinski
- TV announcers (ESPNU): Clay Matvick (play-by-play), Kirk Morrison (analyst)

Game information

First Quarter

- BGSU – Jake Suder 36-yard field goal, 9:29. Falcons 3–0. Drive: 6 plays, 50 yards, 2:12.

Second Quarter

- MSU – Madre London 7-yard run, (Matt Coghlin kick), 11:19. Spartans 7–3. Drive: 12 plays, 67 yards, 6:19.
- MSU – Felton Davis 4-yard pass from Brian Lewerke (Matt Coghlin kick), 00:09. Spartans 14–3 Drive: 7 plays, 85 yards, 1:26.

Third Quarter

- MSU – Felton Davis 8-yard pass from Brian Lewerke (Matt Coghlin kick), 4:35. Spartans 21–3. Drive: 10 plays, 69 yards, 4:35.
- MSU – Matt Sokol 13-yard pass from Brian Lewerke (Matt Coghlin kick), 02:46. Spartans 28–3. Drive: 8 plays, 45 yards, 3:36.
- MSU – Tyson Smith 38-yard interception return (Matt Coghlin kick) 2:24. Spartans 35–3.

Fourth Quarter

- BGSU – Cam Jeffries 46-yard fumble recovery (Jake Suder kick), 14:44. 'Spartans 35–10.

Top Passers

- BGSU – James Morgan 10/31, 145 Yds, 1 INT
- MSU – Brian Lewerke 22/33, 250 Yds, 3 TD

Top Rushers

- BGSU– Andrew Clair 4 attempts, 22 yards
- MSU – Brian Lewerke 8 attempts, 70 yards

Top Receiving

- BGSU – Datrin Guyton 2 receptions, 40 yards
- MSU – Darrell Stewart Jr. 6 receptions, 85 yards

Top Tacklers

- BGSU – Nate Locke 15 tackles
- MSU – Joe Bachie 10 tackles

MSU opened the season at Spartan Stadium against Mid-American Conference opponent, Bowling Green looking to improve upon their poor performance in 2016. The Spartans started well, driving to the Falcon goalline before L. J. Scott fumbled the ball and Bowling Green returned it to their 31-yard line. The Falcons moved the ball down the field and took the lead shortly thereafter on a Jake Suder 36-yard field goal. After this ominous beginning, neither team managed any further points in the first quarter, but the Spartans took the lead for good less than four minutes into the second quarter on a Madre London seven-yard touchdown run. As time ran out in the first half, Brian Lewerke hit Felton Davis for a four-yard touchdown pass to give the Spartans a 14–3 lead at halftime. MSU's offense took control in the third period, scoring touchdowns on back-to-back possessions, both touchdown passes from Brian Lewerke, to give the Spartans a commanding 28–3 lead. Tyson Smith, playing in his first game since suffering a stroke in November 2016, intercepted a Falcon pass and returned it 38 yards for a touchdown and a 35–3 lead. LJ Scott would lose another fumble early in the fourth quarter, this time the Falcons returned it 46 yards for a touchdown to reduce the Spartan lead to 35–10. Neither team scored again as the Spartans moved to 1–0 on the season with a convincing win.

Brian Lewerke played well, completing 22 of this 33 attempts and throwing three touchdowns. He also rushed for 70 yards on the day. L. J. Scott had a poor day, rushing 15 times and gaining only 39 yards and fumbling the ball twice with the Falcons recovering both. The Spartan defense limited the Falcons to three points and 212 total yards on the day.

=== Western Michigan ===
Week Two: Western Michigan at Michigan State – Game summary

Quarter	1	2	3	4	Total
Western Michigan	0	0	7	7	14
Michigan State	7	7	7	7	28

at Spartan Stadium, East Lansing, MI

- Date: September 9, 2017
- Game time: 3:40 pm EDT
- Game weather: 65 °F (18 °C), 6 MPH ENE, Partly Cloudy
- Game attendance: 72,910
- Referee: Daniel Capron
- TV announcers (BTN): Brandon Gaudin (play-by-play), Glen Mason (analyst)

Game information

First Quarter

- MSU – Brian Lewerke 61-yard run (Matt Coghlin kick), 04:43. Spartans 7–0. Drive: 4 plays, 79 yards, 1:37.

Second Quarter

- MSU – L. J. Scott 15-yard pass from Brian Lewerke (Matt Coghlin kick), 06:04. Spartans 14–0. Drive: 9 plays, 51 yards, 2:57.

Third Quarter

- WMU – Darius Phillips 67-yard fumble recovery (Josh Grant kick). Spartans 14–7.
- MSU – Brian Lewerke 1-yard run (Matt Coghlin kick), 06:07. Spartans 21–7. Drive: 6 plays, 75 yards, 2:36.

Fourth Quarter

- MSU – L. J. Scott 2-yard run (Matt Coghlin kick) 10:48. Drive: 9 plays, 76 yards, 2:36. Spartans 28–7.
- WMU – Darius Phillips 100-yard kickoff return (Josh Grant kick), 10:37. 'Spartans 28–14.

Top Passers

- WMU – Jon Wassink 11/26, 79 Yds, 1 INT
- MSU – Brian Lewerke 13/21, 161 Yds, 1 TD, 1 INT

Top Rushers

- WMU– LeVante Bellamy 12 attempts, 76 yards
- MSU – LJ Scott 18 attempts, 92 yards, 1 TD

Top Receiving

- WMU – D'Wayne Eskridge 4 receptions, 42 yards
- MSU – Felton Davis 4 receptions, 69 yards

Top Tacklers

- WMU – Asantay Brown 10 tackles
- MSU – Joe Bachie 11 tackles

In the second week of the season, the Spartans hosted another MAC opponent, the previous year's MAC champion, Western Michigan. The Michigan State defense would hold steady on the opening drive by the Broncos, with Josiah Scott recording his first career interception. The Spartan offense was able to drive into WMU territory following the interception, but was unable to score. Several possessions later, Brian Lewerke finally opened the scoring in the first quarter on a read option play, scoring on a 61-yard run, giving Michigan State a 7–0 lead. Michigan State would add another score late in the second quarter on a 15-yard pass from Lewerke to L. J. Scott. As a result, MSU led 14–0 at halftime. For the second week in a row, an opponent scored on a fumble recovery when true-freshman receiver Hunter Rison had the ball stripped by WMU cornerback Darius Phillips and returned it 67 yards for a touchdown, to pull the Broncos within 14–7. The Spartan offense immediately answered the score, taking less than three minutes on their following drive to score, which included a Darrell Stewart Jr. run of 41 yards to the WMU one-yard line. Lewerke would punch it in from one-yard out, restoring MSU's two touchdown lead, 21–7. The Spartans increased the lead in the fourth quarter when L. J. Scott broke a 44-yard run on fourth and one from the Spartan 45-yard line. Scott would eventually score on a two-yard touchdown run, giving MSU a 28–7 lead. However, Darius Phillips answered the Spartan touchdown on the ensuing kickoff with a 100-yard return for touchdown, making it 28–14. The Bronco offense would finally put a drive together late in the fourth quarter, driving all the way to the MSU 15-yard line before failing to convert on fourth and one. The Spartan offense would then run out the clock to secure the 28–14 victory. The win moved the Spartans to 2–0 on the season with a bye week to follow.

The Michigan State defense played extremely well, tallying four sacks (they had 11 total sacks all of last year) and surrendering only 195 yards and, for the second week in a row, did not give up a touchdown. Brian Lewerke totaled 242 all purpose yards (161 yards passing, 81 yards rushing), with two rushing TDs and a passing TD. LJ Scott led all rushers with 86 yards rushing with a couple of TDs (one receiving and one rushing). Felton Davis led all receivers with four receptions and 69 yards. Michigan State rushed for 296 yards, the most yards rushing the Spartans have had in a game since rushing for 330 yards against Indiana in 2014.

=== Notre Dame ===
Week Three: Notre Dame at Michigan State – Game summary

Quarter	1	2	3	4	Total
Notre Dame	14	14	7	3	38
Michigan State	7	0	3	8	18

at Spartan Stadium, East Lansing, MI

- Date: September 23, 2017
- Game time: 8:00 pm EDT
- Game weather: 84 °F (29 °C), 5 MPH SE, Clear
- Game attendance: 74,023
- Referee: Gary Patterson
- TV announcers (FOX): Gus Johnson (play-by-play), Joel Klatt (analyst), Jenny Taft (sideline reporter)

Game information

First Quarter

- ND – Brandon Wimbush 16-yard run (Justin Yoon kick), 13:05. Irish 7–0. Drive: 7 plays, 78 yards, 1:55.
- ND – Julian Love 59-yard interception return (Justin Yoon kick), 10:33. Irish 14–0.
- MSU – Darrell Stewart Jr. 4-yard pass from Brian Lewerke (Matt Coghlin kick), 06:33. Irish 14–7. Drive: 7 plays, 75 yards, 4:00.

Second Quarter

- ND – Dexter Williams 8-yard pass from Brandon Wimbush (Justin Yoon kick), 9:32. Irish 21–7. Drive: 6 plays, 24 yards, 2:23.
- ND – Dexter Williams 14-yard run (Justin Yoon kick), 0:47. Irish 28–7. Drive: 5 plays, 80 yards, 1:34.

Third Quarter

- MSU – Matt Coghlin 40-yard field goal, 11:13. Irish 28–10. Drive: 9 plays, 53 yards, 3:38.
- ND – Deon McIntosh 9-yard run (Justin Yoon kick), 7:46. Irish 35–10. Drive: 8 plays, 62 yards, 3:19.

Fourth Quarter

- ND – Justin Yoon 46-yard field goal, 04:51. Irish 38–10. Drive: 10 plays, 66 yards, 5:01.
- MSU – Gerald Holmes 25-yard run (Cody White pass from Brian Lewerke for two points), 03:09 Irish 38–18. Drive: 7 plays, 71 yards, 1:35.

Following a bye week, the Spartans welcomed rival Notre Dame to Spartan Stadium for their third consecutive home game. Notre Dame jumped up early on the Spartans, taking the opening drive 78 yards on seven plays as Notre Dame QB Brandon Wimbush ran for 16 yards to put the Irish up 7–0. On the next possession, things got even worse for the Spartans as Brian Lewerke's pass was intercepted by Julian Love and returned 59 yards for a touchdown. Trailing 14–0, the Spartans would answer, going 75 yards and scoring on a Darrell Stewart Jr. four-yard touchdown catch to cut the lead to 14–7. Neither team managed any more points in the first quarter, but Lewerke again committed a mistake early in the second quarter as he fumbled the ball at the MSU 24-yard line. Six plays later Wimbush hit Dexter Williams for an eight-yard touchdown to put the Irish up 21–7. Looking to avoid the rout, the Spartans took their next drive deep into Notre Dame territory. L. J. Scott scored an apparent touchdown from 14 yards out, but he was stripped of the ball before he crossed the goalline and Notre Dame recovered the fumble. Instead of the lead being reduced to 21–14, Notre Dame moved down the field on five plays as Williams again scored for the Irish, putting the score at 28–7. MSU was unable to answer and trailed by 21 at the half.

In the second half, MSU attempted to prevent the blowout, but only managed a field goal on their opening possession. The Irish put the game out of reach on their next possession, going 62 yards on eight plays to balloon the lead to 35–10. Notre Dame added a field goal with five minutes remaining in the game as the MSU offense continued to struggle. The Spartans did get another touchdown as Gerald Holmes caught a 25-yard pass from Brian Lewerke to cut the lead to 38–18 with the two point conversion. However, with just 1:36 remaining the game, it was too little too late and the Spartans fell 38–18. As a result of the win, the Irish received the Megaphone Trophy. The Spartans fell to 2–1 on the season.

MSU outgained the Irish 496–355, but the three turnovers cost the Spartans. Lewerke completed 31 of 51 passes for 340 yards and the Spartans gained 151 yards on the ground. Despite the yardage discrepancy, it was a complete and utter blowout.

=== Iowa ===
Week Four: Iowa at Michigan State – Game summary

Quarter	1	2	3	4	Total
Iowa	0	7	0	3	10
Michigan State	14	3	0	0	17

at Spartan Stadium, East Lansing, MI

- Date: September 30, 2017
- Game time: 4:17 pm EDT
- Game weather: 64 °F (18 °C), 3 MPH NNE, Sunny
- Game attendance: 73,331
- Referee: Mike Cannon
- TV announcers (FOX): Joe Davis (play-by-play), Brady Quinn (analyst), Bruce Feldman (sideline reporter)
- Sources

Game information

First Quarter

- MSU – Felton Davis 22-yard pass from Brian Lewerke (Matt Coghlin kick), 11:50. Spartans 7–0. Drive: 7 plays, 75 yards, 3:10.
- MSU – Felton Davis 6-yard pass from Brian Lewerke (Matt Coghlin kick), 2:11. Spartans 14–0. Drive: 10 plays, 31 yards, 4:08.

Second Quarter

- IOWA – Akrum Wadley 9-yard run (Miguel Recinos kick), 12:15. Spartans 14–7. Drive 10 plays, 72 yards, 4:51.
- MSU – Matt Coghlin 38-yard field goal, 0:43. Spartans 17–7. Drive: 7 plays, 16 yards, 2:50.

Fourth Quarter

- IOWA – Miguel Recinos 43-yard field goal. Spartans 17–10. Drive: 8 plays, 45 yards, 4:56.

In their fourth consecutive home game to begin the season, the Spartans hosted the Hawkeyes in East Lansing in the teams' first matchup since the 2015 Big Ten Championship. MSU started off hot as Brian Lewerke hit his first five passes including a 22-yard catch by Felton Davis for a touchdown and an early 7–0 lead over Iowa. After exchanging punts on their next possessions, the Spartans again got hot through the air as Lewerke again hit Davis, this time from six yards out to move the MSU lead to 14–0. Iowa would answer as they went 72 yards on 10 plays before Akrum Wadley scored on a 9-yard run that cut the lead in half at 14–7. Michigan State managed a 38-yard field goal from Matt Coghlin with 43 seconds left in the half to push the halftime lead to 17–7.

In the second half, both defenses controlled the game. However, Iowa, on the first possession of the half moved to the Spartan five-yard line before Iowa quarterback Nate Stanley fumbled the ball without being touched and MSU recovered at their own three yard line. The first scoring of the half came with a little over nine minutes left in the game as Iowa converted on a Miguel Recinos 43-yard field goal to narrow the lead to 17–10. After exchanging punts, the Spartans punted to Iowa with just over three minutes remaining in the game. The Spartan defense, however, limited the Hawkeyes to three plays before the clock ran out and the Spartans left with the victory 17–10.

Iowa managed only 231 yards in the game while the Spartans put up 300 yard. The difference in the game were the turnovers as the Spartans, who entered the game with eight turnovers on the season, did not turn the ball over while the Hawkeyes lost two fumbles. The win moved MSU to 3–1 on the season and 1–0 in the Big Ten with a trip to Ann Arbor looming.

=== Michigan ===
Week Five: Michigan State at Michigan – Game summary

Quarter	1	2	3	4	Total
Michigan State	7	7	0	0	14
No. 7 Michigan	3	0	7	0	10

at Michigan Stadium, Ann Arbor, MI

- Date: October 7, 2017
- Game time: 7:43 pm EDT
- Game weather: 78 °F (26 °C), Wind: 20-30 MPH SW, Partly Cloudy with Rain
- Game attendance: 112,432
- Referee: John O'Neill
- TV announcers (ABC): Chris Fowler (Play-by-Play), Kirk Herbstreit (Analyst), Maria Taylor (Sideline)

Game information

First Quarter

- MICH – Quinn Nordin 30-yard field goal. Wolverines 3–0. Drive: 16 plays, 64 yards, 6:56.
- MSU – Brian Lewerke 14-yard run (Matt Coghlin kick). Spartans 7–3. Drive: 6 plays, 46 yards, 2:49

Second Quarter

- MSU – Madre London 16-yard pass from Brian Lewerke (Matt Coghlin kick). Spartans 14–3. Drive: 9 plays, 83 yards, 3:45.

Third Quarter

- MICH – Khalid Hill 1-yard run (Quinn Nordin kick). Spartans 14–10. Drive: 4 plays, 33 yards, 1:41.

Leaving Spartan Stadium for the first time on the season, the Spartans traveled to take on rival Michigan in a matchup for the Paul Bunyan Trophy. No. 7-ranked Michigan looked like the better team to start the game as they went 64 yards on 16 plays, but stalled on the MSU 11-yard line and settled for a 30-yard field goal to take an early 3–0 lead. The unranked Spartans were forced to punt on their first possession and, after a first down for Michigan, MSU took control of the game. Joe Bachie stripped Michigan's Ty Isaac and Chris Frey recovered the fumble at the Michigan 46-yard line. The Spartans drove straight down the field and Brian Lewerke scrambled in from 14 yards out to give the Spartans a 7–3 lead. The MSU defense forced Michigan to punt and the Spartan offense stalled at the Michigan 47. Following another punt by the Wolverines, the Spartans capped off an 83-yard drive with a Madre London 16-yard run to put the Spartans up 14–3. Another forced fumble by the Spartan defense ended a Michigan drive at the Spartan 29-yard line with just over a minute remaining in the half. The Spartans happily went to the locker room with a 14–3 lead.

In the second half, the weather became a major factor. With the wind kicking up and a storm approaching, Michigan scored on their second possession after a short punt gave the Wolverines the ball as the Spartan 33. The one-yard touchdown run narrowed the MSU lead to 14–10. MSU's offense, facing a strong wind and a storm, went conservative for the remainder of the game. MSU's defense did not, intercepting Michigan quarterback John O'Korn on the next three possessions. Though MSU did not convert any of the interceptions into points, each stopped a Wolverine drive at crucial junctures. The Spartan defense kept up its good play, forcing Michigan to punt on their next two possessions and the Spartans took over with 3:58 remaining in the game. A pair of MSU first downs, their first first downs of the half, appeared to seal the win for MSU, but penalties set the Wolverines up with the ball at their own 20 with 34 seconds to go. Another personal foul penalty on the Spartans following 15-yard gain gave Michigan the ball at midfield. Finally, as time expired, the Wolverines' Hail Mary-pass was deflected to the ground at the goal line to give the Spartans the win and the Paul Bunyan trophy.

The win gave the Spartans their eighth win over Michigan in the last ten years, all under head coach Mark Dantonio. The Spartans rushed for 158 yards, but were limited to only 94 yards through the air. The MSU defense held the Wolverines to 300 yards. MSU also did not turn the ball over, while forcing five Wolverine turnovers.

=== Minnesota ===
Week Six: Michigan State at Minnesota – Game summary

Quarter	1	2	3	4	Total
No. 21 Michigan State	10	7	6	7	30
Minnesota	6	0	0	21	27

at TCF Bank Stadium, Minneapolis, Minnesota

- Date: October 14, 2017
- Game time: 8:00 pm EDT
- Game weather: 50 °F (10 °C), Wind: N 10 MPH, Rainy
- Game attendance: 47,541
- Referee: Don Willard
- TV announcers (BTN): Brandon Gaudin (play-by-play), Glen Mason (analyst), and Elise Manaker (sideline reporter)

Game information

First Quarter

- MIN – Emmit Carpenter 25-yard field goal. Golden Gophers 3–0. Drive: 4 plays, −4 yards, 1:03.
- MSU – Matt Coghlin 42-yard field goal. Tie 3–3. Drive: 9 plays, 47 yards, 3:19.
- MSU – Madre London 3-yard run (Matt Coghlin kick). Spartans 10–3. Drive: 2 plays, 8 yards, 0:40.
- MIN – Emmit Carpenter 47-yard field goal. Spartans 10–6. Drive: 4 plays, 5 yards, 1:16.

Second Quarter

- MSU – LJ Scott 24-yard run (Matt Coghlin kick). Spartans 17–6. Drive: 6 plays, 62 yards, 3:24.

Third Quarter

- MSU – Matt Coghlin 35-yard field goal. Spartans 20–6. Drive: 9 plays, 58 yards, 4:15.
- MSU – Matt Coghlin 25-yard field goal. Spartans 23–6. Drive: 16 plays, 73 yards, 9:13.

Fourth Quarter

- MIN – Tyler Johnson 28-yard pass from Demry Croft (Emmit Carpenter kick). Spartans 23–13. Drive: 2 plays, 27 yards, 0:50.
- MSU – L. J. Scott 6-yard run (Matt Coghlin kick). Spartans 30–13. Drive: 4 plays, 45 yards, 1:40.
- MIN – Tyler Johnson 17-yd pass from Demry Croft (Emmit Carpenter kick). Spartans 30–20. Drive: 9 plays, 61 yards, 4:55.
- MIN – Tyler Johnson 9-yd pass from Demry Croft (Emmit Carpenter kick). Spartans 30–27. Drive: 10 plays, 73 yards, 1:55.

Going on the road for the second straight week but leaving the state of Michigan for the first time on the season, the newly ranked Spartans traveled to Minnesota. The start of the game was delayed for approximately 45 minutes due to thunderstorms in the area. The weather made for a very sloppy start for both offenses, with Minnesota going three-and-out on their first drive. Michigan State took over, but a fumbled snap set the Spartans back and they had to punt as well. Disaster struck on the punt, as the snap was high and slipped through punter Jake Hartbarger's hands, with Minnesota recovering at the Spartan three yard line. The MSU defense stood tall and drove the Gophers back, leading to an Emmit Carpenter 25-yard field goal to open the scoring. Michigan State responded with a field goal drive of their own, with Matt Coghlin hitting from 42 yards out to even the score at 3–3. On the ensuing Gopher possession, a fumbled hand-off was recovered by Spartan defensive end Kenny Willekes at the Gopher eight yard line. Madre London scored the game's first touchdown two plays later from three yards out to make the score 10–3. After a Gopher punt, Brian Lewerke threw his first interception in three games and the Gophers took over at the MSU 34 yard-line. This led to a 47-yard field goal from Carpenter to make the score 10–6. Michigan State responded with a touchdown drive, with L. J. Scott scoring from 24 yards out to extend the lead to 17–6 at the half.

Michigan State received the opening kickoff of the second half and drove down into the red zone, but were forced to settle for another field goal, with Coghlin hitting from 35 yards out to move the score to 20–6. The Gophers punted on their next possession and the Spartans put together another long drive. However, a false start penalty forced MSU to settle for another Coghlin field goal to increase the lead to 23–6. Following yet another fumble by L. J. Scott, Minnesota recovered scored their first touchdown of the game on a 28-yard pass from Demry Croft to Tyler Johnson to cut the lead to 23–13. After a good kickoff return from Connor Heyward, MSU quickly responded to the Gopher touchdown with Scott scoring from six yards out, making it 30–13 Spartans. Minnesota was not done as Croft found Johnson again for a touchdown from 17 yards out to cut it to 30–20 with under eight minutes remaining in the game. The next Spartan drive led to a missed field goal from 45 yards out and Minnesota took over with under five minutes remaining in the game. Croft found Johnson in the end zone for the third time in the second half to reduce MSU's lead to three. However, Minnesota's onside kick was recovered by MSU as the Spartans pulled out a hard-fought 30–27 victory on the road at Minnesota.

Scott ran for a career-high 194 yards on 25 carries with two touchdowns. London added 74 yards and a touchdown as the Spartans ran for 245 yards in the game while limiting the Gophers to 74 yards on the ground. The win moved the Spartans 5–1 overall and 3–0 in the Big Ten.

=== Indiana ===
Week Seven: Indiana at Michigan State – Game summary

Quarter	1	2	3	4	Total
Indiana	3	0	3	3	9
No. 18 Michigan State	0	3	0	14	17

at Spartan Stadium, East Lansing, MI

- Date: October 21, 2017
- Game time: 3:36 pm EDT
- Game weather: 76 °F (24 °C), Wind: S 12 MPH, Partly Cloudy
- Game attendance: 74,111
- Referee: Ron Snodgrass
- TV announcers (ABC): Dave Flemming (play-by-play), Greg McElroy (analyst), Tom Luginbill (sideline reporter)

Game information

First Quarter

- IND – Griffin Oakes 33-yard field goal. Hoosiers 3–0. Drive: 4 plays, 0 yards, 1:14.

Second Quarter

- MSU – Matt Coghlin 23-yard field goal. Tie 3–3. Drive: 10 plays, 68 yards, 4:59.

Third Quarter

- IND – Griffin Oakes 44-yard field goal. Hoosiers 6–3. Drive: 13 plays, 61 yards, 4:28.

Fourth Quarter

- IND – Griffin Oakes 20-yard field goal. Hoosiers 9–3. Drive: 12 plays, 63 yards, 4:37.
- MSU – Felton Davis 10-yard pass from Brian Lewerke (Matt Coghlin kick). Spartans 10–9. Drive: 7 plays, 55 yards, 3:08.
- MSU – L. J,. Scott 18-yard run (Matt Coghlin kick). Spartans 17–9. Drive: 7 plays, 64 yards, 3:15.

The Spartans returned home to face rival Indiana on Homecoming in East Lansing in a matchup for the Old Brass Spittoon. Michigan State had its seven-game winning streak in the series snapped last season as the Hoosiers defeated the Spartans in overtime. Prior to the game, it was announced that MSU running back L. J. Scott would play after being arrested for driving without a license during the week.

Both offenses struggled throughout the first half. Following a Madre London fumble that was recovered at the MSU 15-yard line by the IU defense, Indiana notched their only points of the half on a Griffin Oakes 33-yard field goal with 1:14 remaining in the first quarter. The teams exchanged punts before Michigan State hit a Matt Coghlin 22-yard field goal, capping off a 10 play, 68-yard drive with 6:46 remaining in the first half. Punts ruled the remainder of the half as the score remained 3–3 at halftime.

The defenses continued to assert themselves in the second half, as neither offense could sustain drives to begin the third quarter. Indiana finally put a lengthy drive together with just under 10 minutes left in the third quarter, driving all the way to the Michigan State 26-yard line before being forced to settle for a 44-yard field goal to give the Hoosiers a 6–3 lead. On the ensuing possession, MSU's offense also came alive on a nine-play, 40 yard drive, but the Spartans would turn the ball over on downs at the Indiana 35-yard line. Indiana took over and drove to the MSU two-yard line before being stymied again by the Spartan defense and being forced to settle for another field goal that gave Indiana a 9–3 lead with 12:29 remaining in the game. The teams exchanged punts as MSU quarterback Brian Lewerke repeatedly missed open receivers with inaccurate throws. Taking over at their own 45 with 9:07 remaining in the game, the Spartans moved the ball down the field converting on a fourth and three with a Lewerke pass to Hunter Rison for a first down. Two plays later, Felton Davis caught the go-ahead touchdown pass from Lewerke to give MSU a 10–9 lead. The Spartan defense again forced a three-and-out, handing the offense an opportunity to run out the clock with 4:39 remaining. On third down and eight, Lewerke again hit Hunter Rison for a first down. Indiana, using their timeouts, forced the Spartans into another third and long situation. Lewerke again converted on a pass to Cody White for a gain of 34 yards. Indiana, in an effort to preserve their final timeout and to ensure that they got the ball back with enough time to score and tie the game, purposely allowed LJ Scott to score on from 18 yards out on the following play. The score gave Michigan State a 17–9 lead with 1:49 remaining. the MSU defense held stout, forcing Indian to turn the ball over on downs, allowing MSU to run out the clock for the win.

Cody White led all receivers with seven receptions for 99 yards and L. J. Scott rushed for 87 yards and a touchdown. Joe Bachie recorded a career high 13 tackles, including a forced fumble. For the third time on the season, the defense did not allow an offensive touchdown. With the win, Michigan State reclaimed the Old Brass Spittoon and became bowl eligible. The win moved MSU to 6–1 on the season and 4–0 in the Big Ten.

=== Northwestern ===
Week Eight: Michigan State at Northwestern – Game summary

Quarter	1	2	3	4	OT	2OT	3OT	Total
No. 16 Michigan State	7	3	0	7	7	7	0	31
Northwestern	0	10	0	7	7	7	8	39

- Date: October 28, 2017
- Game time: 3:30 pm EDT
- Game weather: 40 °F (4 °C), Wind: 12 MPH W, Cloudy
- Game attendance: 39,369
- Referee: Mark Kluczynski
- TV announcers (ESPN): Anish Shroff (play-by-play), Ahmad Brooks (analyst)

Game information

First Quarter

- MSU – Cody White 6-yard pass from Brian Lewerke (Matt Coghlin kick), 12:25. Spartans 7–0. Drive: 7 plays, 92 yards, 2:35.

Second Quarter

- MSU – Matt Coghlin 46-yard field goal 9:31. Spartans 10–0. Drive: 6 plays, 20 yards, 3:22.
- NU – Clayton Thorson 1-yard run (Charlie Kuhbander kick), 3:58. Spartans 7–0. Drive: 13 plays, 81 yards, 5:28.
- NU – Charlie Kuhbander 35-yard field goal, 0:04. Tie 10–10. Drive: 11 plays 56 yards, 1:45.

Fourth Quarter

- NU – Ben Skowronek 12-yard pass from Justin Jackson (Charlie Kuhbander kick), 10:49. Wildcats 17–10.' Drive: 5 plays, 58 yards, 1:27.
- MSU – Felton Davis 13-yard pass from Brian Lewerke (Matt Coghlin kick), 0:25. Tie 17–17. Drive: 12 plays, 88 yards, 2:49.

First Overtime

- NU – Cameron Gree 14-yard pass from Clayton Thorsson (Charlie Kuhbander kick). Wildcats 24–17. Drive: 5, plays 25 yards.
- MSU – Felton Davis 6-yard pass from Brian Lewerke (Matt Coghlin kick). Tie 24–24. Drive: 5 plays, 25 yards.

Second Overtime

- MSU – Cody White 11-yard pass from Brian Lewerke (Matt Coghlin kick). Spartans 31–24.' Drive 2 plays, 25 yards.
- NU – Justin Jackson 3-yard run (Charlie Kuhbander kick). Tie 31–31. Drive 4 plays, 25 yards.

Third Overtime

- NU – Flynn Nagel 22-yard pass from Clayton Thorson (Cameron Green pass from Clayton Thorson). Wildcats 39–31. Drive: 3 plays, 25 yards.

MSU's third road game on the season was a trip to face Northwestern. MSU started well, driving 92 yards on their opening possession as Brian Lewerke hit Cody White from six yards out to give MSU the 7–0 lead. Northwestern moved into MSU territory on their first possession, but Andrew Dowell forced a fumble which was recovered by his brother David Dowell to end the Wildcat threat. MSU's offense again moved deep into Northwestern territory looking to increase their lead, but Cody White fumbled at the NU 7-yard line to end the MSU drive. The teams exchanged punts into the second quarter before MSU again moved into NU territory. This time the Wildcat defense forced a field goal by Matt Coghlin which moved the Spartan lead to 10–0. Northwestern answered on their next drive, scoring from one yard out to narrow the lead to 10–7. Following a punt, NU took over with 1:49 remaining in the half and drove into MSU territory. The MSU defense finally stiffened and forced Northwestern to settle for a 35-yard field goal to tie the game at the half.

In the third quarter, both offenses started well, but had drives stall as NU punted from MSU territory and the Spartans' Matt Coghlan hit the right upright on a 51-yard field goal attempt. The teams exchanged punts into the fourth quarter before Northwestern moved to the Spartan 12-yard line. On a halfback pass play, Justin Jackson hit Ben Skowronek to give the Wildcats a 17–10 lead with just over 10 minutes remaining in the game. MSU attempted to answer, moving into NU territory again, but Matt Coghlin again hit the right upright, this time from 32 yards out as the score remained 17–10. Following a Wildcats put, MSU, needing a touchdown to tie, took over at their own 12 with 3:14 left in the game. The offense moved down to the NU 30-yard line with 53 seconds remaining. On fourth down, Brian Lewerke scrambled for the first down to keep MSU alive. Two plays later, Lewerke hit Felton Davis in the corner of the end zone to tie the game at 17 with 25 seconds remaining. The Wildcats simply knelt out the clock to force overtime.

In the first overtime, NU took three plays to shred the MSU defense for a touchdown as Clayton Thorson found Cameron Green open for a 14-yard touchdown and an NU lead 24–17. MSU answered in their possession as Lewerke again hit Davis for a six-yard touchdown to force a second overtime. In the second overtime, MSU took the lead as Lewerke hit White for another touchdown from 11 yards out. MSU's defense could not hold the lead however, allowing an NU touchdown in four plays to tie the game again. In the third overtime, the MSU defense continued its struggles giving up a 22-yard touchdown pass on third down and allowing the two-point conversion as NU took a 39–31 lead. Following an incomplete pass, Lewerke fumbled on the second play of overtime, but was able to recover and scramble out of the pocket. However, a poor decision by Lewerke to thrown the ball over the middle of the field resulted in the ball being intercepted by the Wildcats and giving MSU its second loss on the season.

Lewerke set an MSU single-game record, throwing for 445 yards in the loss. MSU's defense struggled for one of the first times in the season, allowing 432 yards to Northwestern's offense.

=== Penn State ===
Week Nine: Penn State at Michigan State – Game summary

Quarter	1	2	3	4	Total
No. 7 Penn State	14	0	10	0	24
No. 24 Michigan State	7	7	7	6	27

at Spartan Stadium, East Lansing, MI

- Date: November 4, 2017
- Game time: 12:00 p.m. EDT
- Game weather: 43 °F (6 °C), Wind: 10 MPH NE, Overcast, rain
- Game attendance: 71,605
- Referee: Don Willard
- TV announcers (FOX): Joe Davis (play-by-play), Brady Quinn (analyst), Bruce Feldman (sideline reporter)

Game information

First quarter

- PSU – DaeSean Hamilton 31-yard pass from Trace McSorley (Tyler Davis kick), 5:40. Nittany Lions 7–0. Drive: 7 plays, 92 yards, 3:00.
- MSU – Darrell Stewart Jr. 7-yard pass from Brian Lewerke (Matt Coghlin kick) 3:28. Tie 7–7. Drive: 4 plays, 52 yards, 2:12.
- PSU – Saeed Blacknall 27-yard pass from Trace McSorley (Tyler Davis kick), 0:42. Nittany Lions 14–7. Drive: 9 plays, 75 yards, 2:46.

Second quarter

- MSU – Felton Davis III 33-yard pass from Brian Lewerke (Matt Coghlin kick), 3:54. Tie 14–14. Drive: 5 plays, 69 yards, 2:24.

Third quarter

- MSU – L. J. Scott 3-yard run (Matt Coghlin kick), 7:25. Spartans 21–14. Drive: 10 plays, 91 yards, 5:10.
- PSU – Tyler Davis 26-yard field goal, 2:11. Spartans 21–17. Drive: 12 plays, 71 yards, 5:14.
- PSU – DeAndre Thompkins 70-yard pass from Trace McSorley (Tyler Davis kick), 0:00. Nittany Lions 24–21. Drive: 1 play, 70 yards, 0:05

Fourth quarter

- MSU – Matt Coghlin 32-yard field goal, 10:56. Tie 24−24. Drive: 11 plays, 45 yards, 4:04.
- MSU – Matt Coghlin 34-yard field goal, 0:00. Spartans 27–24. Drive: 10 plays, 53 yards, 4:05.

Top Passers

- PSU – Trace McSorley 26/47, 381 Yds, 3 TD, 3 INT
- MSU – Brian Lewerke 33/56, 400 Yds, 2 TD, 1 INT

Top Rushers

- PSU – Saquon Barkley 14 attempts, 68 yards
- MSU – L. J. Scott 13 attempts, 43 yards, 1 TD

Top Receiving

- PSU – DaeSean Hamilton 7 receptions, 112 yards, 1 TD
- MSU – Felton Davis 12 receptions, 181 yards, 1 TD

Top Tacklers

- PSU – Troy Apke/Koa Farmer 8 tackles
- MSU – Khari Willis 11 tackles

Coming off their first Big Ten loss, MSU welcomed rival and reigning Big Ten Champion Penn State to Spartan Stadium, marking the first time since 2013 the teams did not conclude the regular season playing each other. The Nittany Lions were also coming off their first Big Ten loss, having blown a lead against Ohio State the prior week.

MSU forced a Penn State turnover on the opening possession of the game as Joe Bachie intercepted a Trace McSorley pass to give the ball to MSU for their first possession. MSU moved into Penn State territory, but stalled and were forced to punt. Starting at their own eight yard line, PSU moved quickly down the field and opened the scoring as McSorley connected on a 31-yard touchdown pass to DaeSean Hamilton to give the Nittany Lions a 7–0 lead. A personal foul penalty on the Lions on the ensuing kickoff gave MSU the ball at their own 48-yard line. Four plays later, Brian Lewerke found Darrell Stewart Jr. on a seven-yard touchdown pass to tie the game at seven. However, PSU answered, moving 75 yards on nine plays as McSorley hit Saeed Blacknall on fourth down to take a 14–7 lead. After each team exchanged punts, MSU moved into Penn State territory before a weather delay stopped play with 7:58 remaining in the second quarter. Due to lightning and storms in the area, the game was delayed for three hours and 23 minutes. The teams began play again around 3:30 EDT and MSU turned the ball over on downs. After a Penn State punt, the Spartans moved quickly down the field and Lewerke hit Felton Davis on a 33-yard touchdown pass to tie the game with 3:50 left in the half. Neither team could manage anything further as the half ended with the score tied at 14.

To begin the second half, each team punted the ball before MSU moved 91 yards on a 10-play drive capped off by an L. J. Scott three-yard touchdown pass to give the Spartans a 21–14 lead. Penn State, looking to answer, stalled on their next drive at the MSU eight yard line and settled for a field goal to reduce the lead to 21–17. Following a Spartan punt, McSorley hit a wide-open DeAndre Thompkins on a 70-yard touchdown pass to take a 24–21 lead as the third quarter expired. The Spartans, again given good field position due to a PSU personal foul on the kickoff, answered on their next possession. The drive sputtered at the PSU 14, and Matt Coghlin kicked a 32-yard field goal to tie the game at 24. McSorley was intercepted on the next PSU possession, but the Spartans were forced to punt. Looking to take the lead, the Lions moved to the Spartan 31 yard line, but McSorley's pass fell incomplete on fourth down with 4:05 remaining in regulation. MSU moved methodically down the field and on third down from the Lion 27 yard line, Lewerke's pass to Cody White fell incomplete appearing to end the drive. However, PSU was called for roughing Lewerke on the play to give the Spartans a first down at the PSU 22. With time running out, MSU maneuvered to the Lion 16 yard line to set up Coghlin for the game-winning field goal as time expired, giving MSU the 27–24 win.

Brian Lewerke threw for 400 yards for the second consecutive game, the first Spartan ever to do that and only the third Big Ten quarterback to accomplish that feat in the last 20 years. The game completed at 7:03 EDT, some seven hours and three minutes after the start. The win left MSU in the driver's seat in the Big Ten East with only loss and facing Ohio State, also with one loss, the next week.

=== Ohio State ===
Week Ten: Michigan State at Ohio State – Game summary

Quarter	1	2	3	4	Total
No. 12 Michigan State	0	3	0	0	3
No. 13 Ohio State	14	21	13	0	48

at Ohio Stadium, Columbus, OH

- Date: November 11, 2017
- Game time: 12:00 p.m. EST
- Game weather: 34 °F (1 °C), Wind: 5 MPH ESE, Mostly cloudy
- Game attendance: 107,011
- Referee: Michael Cannon
- TV announcers (FOX): Joe Davis (play-by-play), Brady Quinn (analyst), Bruce Feldman (sideline reporter)

Game information

First quarter

- OSU – Mike Weber 47-yard run (Sean Nuernberger kick), 8:14. Buckeyes 7–0. Drive: 6 plays, 86 yards, 1:19.
- OSU – J. T. Barrett 4-yard run (Sean Nuernberger kick), 0:17. Buckeyes 14–0. Drive: 11 plays, 73 yards, 3:55.

Second Quarter

- OSU – J. T. Barrett 4-yard run (Sean Nuernberger kick), 11:35. Buckeyes 21–0. Drive: 9 plays, 68 yards, 3:12.
- OSU – J. K. Dobbins 8-yard pass from J.T. Barrett (Sean Nuernberger kick), 9:21. Buckeyes 28–0. Drive: 3 plays, 25 yards, 0:56.
- OSU – Mike Weber 82-yard run (Sean Nuernberger kick), 6:16. Buckeyes 35–0. Drive: 1 play, 82 yards, 0:11.
- MSU – Matt Coghlin 37-yard field goal, 0:00. Buckeyes 35–3. Drive: 7 plays, 24 yards, 0:59.

Third Quarter

- OSU – Binjimen Victor 48-yard pass from J.T. Barrett 4-yard (Sean Nuernberger kick), 14:06. Buckeyes 42–3. Drive: 3 plays, 72 yards, 0:54.
- OSU – Sean Nuernberger 27-yard field goal, 9:17. Buckeyes 45–3. Drive: 8 plays 56 yards, 2:36.
- OSU – Sean Nuernberger 28-yard field goal, 0:00. Buckeyes 48–3. Drive: 13 plays 79 yards, 5:36.

Top Passers

- OSU – J. T. Barrett 14/21, 183 Yds, 2 TD, 2 INT
- MSU – Brian Lewerke 18/36, 131 Yds, 1 INT

Top Rushers

- OSU – Mike Weber 9 attempts, 162 yards , 2 TD
- MSU – L. J. Scott 8 attempts, 32 yards

Top Receiving

- OSU – Parris Campbell 3 receptions, 49 yards
- MSU – Cody White 5 receptions, 42 yards

Top Tacklers

- OSU – Tuf Borland 11 tackles
- MSU – Kenny Willekes 9 tackles

MSU traveled to Columbus to take on Ohio State with a chance to move into sole possession of first place in the Big Ten East division. However, Ohio State would have none of that, blowing out the Spartans 48–3, the worst lost by MSU under head coach Mark Dantonio. The Buckeyes scored touchdowns on five of their first six possessions to take a commanding 35–0 lead before halftime. OSU rushed for 335 yards against MSU's defense, the most allowed by a defense at MSU under Dantonio. Meanwhile, the Spartan offense struggled mightily as well, rushing for only 64 yards while amassing only 195 yards of total offense. A Matt Coghlin field goal as the first half expired marked the Spartans only points of the game. The Buckeyes would add a touchdown and two field goals in the second half to end any realistic shot the Spartans had at the Big Ten Championship. The loss left the Spartans at 7–3 on the season and 5–2 in Big Ten play with two games remaining.

=== Maryland ===
Week Eleven: Maryland at Michigan State – Game summary

Quarter	1	2	3	4	Total
Maryland	0	0	0	7	7
No. 17 Michigan State	7	7	3	0	17

at Spartan Stadium, East Lansing, MI

- Date: November 18, 2017
- Game time: 4:12 pm EST
- Game weather: 41 °F (5 °C), Wind: 13 MPH N, Rain
- Game attendance: 70,216
- Referee: Jerry McGinn
- TV announcers (FOX): Tim Brando (play-by-play), Spencer Tillman (analyst)

Game information

First quarter

- MSU – L. J. Scott 2-yard run (Matt Coghlin kick), 7:48. Spartans 7–0. Drive: 11 plays, 69 yards, 5:27.

Second quarter

- MSU – Brian Lewerke 25-yard run (Matt Coghlin kick), 14:52. Spartans 14–0. Drive: 8 plays, 85 yards, 4:31.

Third quarter

- MSU – Matt Coghlin 27-yard field goal, 1:32. Spartans 17–0. Drive: 11 plays, 49 yards, 7:17.

Fourth quarter

- MD – Lorenzo Harrison 4-yard run (Henry Darmstadter kick), 9:50. Spartans 17–3. Drive:7 plays, 59 yards, 2:42.

Top Passers

- MD – Max Bortenschlager 13/25, 121 Yds
- MSU – Brian Lewerke 2/14, 20 Yds

Top Rushers

- MD – Lorenzo Harris 13 attempts, 54 yards, 1 TD
- MSU – L. J. Scott 29 attempts, 148 yards, 1 TD

Top Receiving

- MD – D. J. Moore 8 receptions, 76 yards
- MSU – Matt Sokol 1 receptions, 12 yards

Top Tacklers

- MD – Isaiah Davis/Jermaine Carter 12 tackles
- MSU – Joe Bachie 11 tackles

Following the worst loss under head coach Mark Dantonio, the Spartans returned home for Senior Day against Maryland. On a rainy day that often turned to snow, both offenses struggled. However, on MSU's first possession of the game, the Spartans moved 69 yards on 11 plays as L.J. Scott capped the drive with a two-yard touchdown run to give the Spartans the early 7–0 lead. MSU added to the lead early in the second quarter as Brian Lewerke scored on a 25-yard run to increase the lead to 14–0. MSU continued to dominate the game moving inside the Terrapin 10 yard line on their next possession, but a Gerald Holmes fumble was recovered by Maryland at their own one-yard line to end the drive. As MSU's defense dominated Maryland in the first half, the Spartans took a 14–0 lead at the half.

Late in the third quarter, MSU added to the lead again on a Matt Coghlin field goal to move the lead to 17–0. Rain and snow continued to hamper both offenses as neither team could manage much offense. Maryland finally got on the board in the fourth quarter, scoring on a four-yard run by Lorenzo Harrison to reduce the lead to 17–7. A missed field goal on the next Maryland possession gave the Spartans the ball as they were able to run out the clock for a 17–7 win.

The win moved the Spartans to 8–3 on the season and 6–2 in the Big Ten. However, a win by Ohio State that day eliminated MSU from the Big Ten Championship. MSU outgained Maryland 291–204 while MSU's offense rushed for 271 yards in the game with L. J. Scott accounting for 147 of the MSU rushing yards. Brian Lewerke struggled on the day, completing only two of 14 attempts for 20 yards.

=== Rutgers ===
Week Twelve: Michigan State at Rutgers – Game summary

Quarter	1	2	3	4	Total
No. 16 Michigan State	13	3	3	21	40
Rutgers	0	7	0	0	7

at High Point Solutions Stadium, Piscataway, NJ

- Date: November 25, 2017
- Game time: 4:17 EST
- Game weather: 58°F (14°C), Wind: 10 MPH S, Mostly Cloudy
- Game attendance: 35,021
- Referee: Don Willard
- TV announcers (FOX): Brian Custer (play-by-play), Ben Leber (analyst), Jen Hale (sideline reporter)

Game information

First Quarter

- MSU – Connor Heyward 7-yard pass from Brian Lewerke (Matt Coghlin kick). Spartans 7–0. Drive: 9 plays, 75 yards, 5:11.
- MSU – Matt Coghlin 26-yard field goal. Spartans 10–0. Drive: 4 plays, 0 yards, 0:54.
- MSU – Matt Coghlin 26-yard field goal. Spartans 13–0. Drive: 13 plays, 40 yards, 7:12.

Second Quarter

- RU – Raheem Blackshear 42-yard pass from Johnathan Lewis (Andre Harte kick). Spartans 13–7. Drive: 5 plays, 73 yards, 1:45.
- MSU – Matt Coghlin 46-yard field goal. Spartans 16–7. Drive: 6 plays, 22 yards, 3:06.

Third Quarter

- MSU – Matt Coghlin 32-yard field goal. Spartans 19–7. Drive: 11 plays, 55 yards, 5:20.

Fourth Quarter

- MSU – Gerald Holmes 2-yard run (Matt Coghlin kick). Spartans 26–7. Drive: 12 plays, 60 yards, 6:00.
- MSU – Brian Lewerke 3-yard run (Matt Coghlin kick). Spartans 33–7. Drive: 8 plays, 48 yards, 4:01.
- MSU – Madre London 3-yard run (Matt Coghlin kick). Spartans 40–7. Drive: 11 plays, 54 yards, 6:39.

Top Passers

- MSU – Brian Lewerke: 21/31, 222 yards, TD
- RU – Johnathan Lewis: 6/16, 48 yards, TD, 2 INTs

Top Rushers

- MSU – Brian Lewerke: 12 attempts, 65 yards, TD
- RU – Gus Edwards/Johnathan Lewis: 4 attempts, 12 yards

Top Receiving

- MSU – Felton Davis III: 6 receptions, 72 yards
- RU – Raheem Blackshear: 2 receptions, 50 yards, TD

Top Tacklers

- MSU – Khari Willis: 3 tackles
- RU – Trevor Morris: 19 tackles

On the final day of the regular season, the Spartans travelled to New Jersey to take on Rutgers, the team against which MSU tallied its lone conference win from the prior year. MSU started fast scoring on their first possession as Brian Lewerke hit Connor Heyward from seven yards out for the early 7–0 lead. On the ensuing Rutgers possession, MSU forced a fumble on the first play which was recovered by Andrew Dowell at the Rutgers eight yard line. The Spartans were unable to get into the end zone, however, and settled for a Matt Coghlin 26-yard field goal. Following a Scarlet Knight punt, MSU again moved deep into Rutgers territory, but again could not punch the ball in and settled for another 26-yard field goal and a 13–0 lead. Rutgers answered on their next possession early in the second quarter on a 42-yard touchdown pass to pull within 13–7. The Spartans were able to add another Coghlin field goal to take a 16–7 lead at the half.

Another field goal led off the third quarter for the Spartans as they took a 19–7 lead with five minutes remaining in the third. On MSU's next drive, the Spartans went 60 yards and 12 plays in six minutes and finally scored another touchdown early in the fourth quarter as Gerald Holmes ran in from two yards out to increase the lead to 26–7. Following a Spartan interception, Brian Lewerke scored from three yards out on the next Spartan possession to push the lead to 33–7. Another interception preceded another touchdown, this a Madre London three-yard run as the Spartans pushed the score to 40–7 and ran away with the win.

The Spartan defense performed well, limiting Rutgers to 112 total yards, only five first downs, and forcing three turnovers. Meanwhile, MSU ran for 209 yards and threw for 222 in the rout. The win capped a turnaround season as the Spartans went from a 3–9 record in 2016 to 9–3 record with the win. The Spartans finished at 7–2 in the Big Ten in a tie for second place in the East division.

=== Holiday Bowl ===
2017 Holiday Bowl: Michigan State vs. Washington State – Game summary

Quarter	1	2	3	4	Total
No. 16 Michigan State	0	21	14	7	42
No. 21 Washington State	3	0	7	7	17

at Qualcomm Stadium, San Diego, CA

- Date: December 28, 2017
- Game time: 8:30 p.m. EST
- Game weather: 66°F (18°C), Wind: 5 MPH N, Clear
- Game attendance: 47,092
- Referee: Mark Cules
- TV announcers (FS1): Gus Johnson (play-by-play), Joel Klatt (analyst), Jenny Taft (sideline reporter)

Game information

First Quarter

- WSU – Erik Powell 45-yard field goal. Cougars 3–0. Drive: 14 plays, 64 yards, 6:05.

Second Quarter

- MSU – Cody White 15-yard pass from Brian Lewerke (Matt Coghlin kick good). Spartans 7–3. Drive: 16 plays, 81 yards, 9:24.
- MSU – Felton Davis 49-yard pass from Brian Lewerke (Matt Coghlin kick good). Spartans 14–3. Drive: 4 plays, 63 yards, 2:03.
- MSU – L. J. Scott 3-yard run (Matt Coghlin kick good). Spartans 21–3. Drive: 6 plays, 68 yards, 2:43.

Third Quarter

- MSU – Cody White 10-yard pass from Brian Lewerke (Matt Coghlin kick). Spartans 28–3. Drive: 10 plays, 67 yards, 4:32.
- MSU – Damion Terry 6-yard run (Matt Coghlin kick good). Spartans 35–3. Drive: 7 plays, 27 yards, 3:47.
- WSU – Davontavean Martin 14-yard pass from Tyler Hilinski (Erik Powell kick good). Spartans 35–10. Drive: 7 plays, 80 yards, 3:02.

Fourth Quarter

- WSU – Davontavean Martin 15-yard pass from Tyler Hilinski (Erik Powell kick good). Spartans 35–17. Drive: 9 plays, 67 yards, 2:57.
- MSU – L. J. Scott 28-yard run (Matt Coghlin kick). Spartans 42–17. Drive: 4 plays, 46 yards, 2:12.

Top Passers

- MSU – Brian Lewerke: 13/23, 213 yards, 3 TDs
- WSU – Tyler Hilinski: 39/50, 272 yards, 2 TDs, INT

Top Rushers

- MSU – L. J. Scott: 18 attempts, 110 yards, 2 TDs
- WSU – James Williams: 3 attempts, 14 yards

Top Receivers

- MSU – Felton Davis III: 4 receptions, 118 yards, TD
- WSU – James Williams: 10 receptions, 65 yards

Top Tacklers

- MSU – Joe Bachie/Chris Frey: 6 tackles
- WSU – Isaac Dotson: 10 tackles

Michigan State received an invitation to play Washington State in the 2017 Holiday Bowl. The appearance marked the Spartans first bowl appearance since playing in the College Football Playoffs during the 2015 season. Washington State was without its starting quarterback Luke Falk (injury) and its top two wide receivers (dismissed from team) for the game.

Neither team's offense started the game well with only the Cougars managing a field goal in the first quarter. In the second quarter, the game turned around for the Spartans. MSU scored the first touchdown of the game following a 16-play, 81 yard, 9:24 second drive that was capped off by a Brian Lewerke touchdown pass to Cody White. The touchdown gave the Spartans the lead 7–3, a lead they would never relinquish. Following a punt by WSU, the Spartans scored quickly on Lewerke's 49-yard touchdown pass to Felton Davis to increase the lead to 14–3. The Spartan defense again forced WSU to punt and MSU took over with 3:12 remaining in the half. The Spartans scored another touchdown, their third straight touchdown, on an L. J. Scott three-yard run to increase the lead to 21–3 at the half.

MSU kept the great play up in the second half, scoring their fourth touchdown on their fourth straight possession as Lewerke hit White again for a 10-yard touchdown as the lead ballooned to 28–3. WSU fumbled the ball on the ensuing possession and MSU capitalized as Lewerke moved MSU to the one yard line. However, Lewerke was forced to leave the game after being hit in the head on a rush. Senior quarterback Damian Terry replaced Lewerke and bowled his way in from six yards out to put the game out of reach at 35–3. WSU scored their first touchdown on their next possession, however, to draw within 25 at 35–10. Terry, still in the game for Lewerke was intercepted on the ensuing possession and WSU scored again narrowing the lead to 35–17 with 8:25 left in the game. Following a failed onside kick by the Cougars, Lewerke returned to the game to hand the ball off to L. J. Scott on four straight downs and Scott rushed for 46 yards, scoring from 28 yards out to push the lead to 42–17. A Spartan interception on the next WSU possession ensured the game would end with an MSU victory. Terry returned to the game on the final MSU possession, but the Spartans were forced to punt. The Cougars had one last gasp, but ran out of time as the Spartans cruised to the 42–17 victory.

The Spartans dominated the Cougars in the game, out-gaining them 440–296. MSU out-rushed WSU 227–24 in the game and controlled the ball for nearly 37 minutes. The win was the largest bowl victory in MSU history.

The win marked the 100th win at MSU for head coach Mark Dantonio, placing him second all-time in MSU history. The win was also the 10th on the season for the Spartans, their eighth 10-win season, sixth under Dantonio, in school history. Following the game, MSU running back L. J. Scott, who rushed the ball 18 times for 110 yards and two touchdowns, announced he would return to MSU for his senior season.

== Rankings ==
Ranking movements Legend: ██ Increase in ranking ██ Decrease in ranking — = Not ranked RV = Received votes
	Week															
Poll	Pre	1	2	3	4	5	6	7	8	9	10	11	12	13	14	Final
AP	RV	RV	RV	RV	RV	—	21	18	16	24	13	22	21	19	18	15
Coaches	RV	—	RV	RV	—	RV	22	19	18	RV	16	24	22	19	19	16
CFP	Not released									24	12	17	16	16	16	Not released

== Players in the 2018 NFL draft ==
Player	Position	Round	Pick	NFL club
Brian Allen	C	4	111	Los Angeles Rams
