= Justin Jones (American football) =

American football player (born 1996)

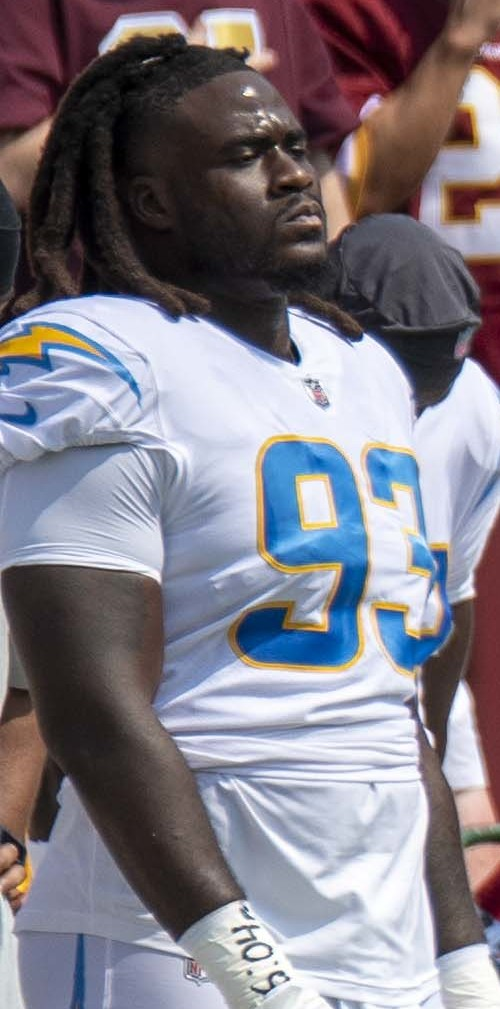
- Jones with the Los Angeles Chargers in 2021

Profile
- Position: Nose tackle

Personal information
- Born: August 28, 1996 (age 30); Bronx, New York, U.S.
- Listed height: 6 ft 3 in (1.91 m)
- Listed weight: 300 lb (136 kg)

Career information
- High school: South Cobb (Austell, Georgia)
- College: NC State (2014–2017)
- NFL draft: 2018: 3rd round, 84th overall pick

Career history
- Los Angeles Chargers (2018–2021); Chicago Bears (2022–2023); Arizona Cardinals (2024–2025)

Career NFL statistics as of 2024
- Total tackles: 223
- Sacks: 12
- Forced fumbles: 1
- Fumble recoveries: 3
- Pass deflections: 10
- Stats at Pro Football Reference

Justin Maurice Jones (born August 28, 1996) is an American professional football nose tackle. Jones last played for the Arizona Cardinals of the National Football League (NFL). He played college football for the NC State Wolfpack. He was selected by the Los Angeles Chargers in the third round of the 2018 NFL draft.

== College career ==
Following his senior season, Jones was selected to play in the 2018 Senior Bowl.

== Professional career ==
=== Pre-draft ===
On November 29, 2017, it was announced that Jones had accepted his invitation to play in the Senior Bowl. He impressed scouts by showing his agility during Senior Bowl practices and added value to his draft stock. On January 27, 2018, Jones played in the 2018 Reese's Senior Bowl and was part of Denver Broncos' head coach Vance Joseph's South team that lost 45–16 to the North team, coached by Houston Texans' head coach Bill O'Brien. Jones attended the NFL Scouting Combine in Indianapolis and completed all of the combine and positional drills. On March 19, 2018, he participated at NC State's pro day, but opted to stand on his combine numbers and only performed positional drills and the short shuttle. At the conclusion of the pre-draft process, Jones was projected to be a fifth or sixth round pick by NFL draft experts and scouts. He was ranked as the 14th best defensive tackle prospect in the draft by Scouts Inc. and was ranked the 20th best defensive tackle by DraftScout.com.

External videos
- NFL Draft Profile: Justin Jones
- Justin Jones' NFL Combine Workout

Pre-draft measurables
Height	Weight	Arm length	Hand span	Wingspan	40-yard dash	10-yard split	20-yard split	20-yard shuttle	Three-cone drill	Vertical jump	Broad jump	Bench press
6 ft 2 1/2 in (1.89 m)	309 lb (140 kg)	33 1/2 in (0.85 m)	10 in (0.25 m)	6 ft 9 in (2.06 m)	5.09 s	1.76 s	2.96 s	4.71 s	7.82 s	29 in (0.74 m)	8 ft 8 in (2.64 m)	24 reps
All values from NFL Combine/Pro Day

External videos
- Chargers draft Justin Jones 84th overall

=== Los Angeles Chargers ===
The Los Angeles Chargers selected Jones in the third round (84th overall) in the 2018 NFL draft. Jones was the eighth defensive tackle drafted in 2018. On May 13, 2018, the Chargers signed Jones to a four-year, $3.62 million contract that includes a signing bonus of $854,140.

On September 26, 2020, Jones was placed on injured reserve with a shoulder injury. He was activated on October 24.

On October 4, 2021, Jones was placed on injured reserve. He was activated on October 30.

=== Chicago Bears ===
On March 18, 2022, Jones signed a two-year, $12 million deal with the Chicago Bears. On December 5, 2023, Jones was named the Bears nominee for the 2023 Walter Payton Man of the Year Award

=== Arizona Cardinals ===
On March 14, 2024, Jones signed a three-year, $30.1 million contract with the Arizona Cardinals. In three games for Arizona, he logged four combined tackles and one fumble recovery. In the Cardinals' Week 3 game against the Detroit Lions, Jones suffered a torn triceps, ending his season. Jones was waived on November 17, 2025.
