= Bobby Johnson (American football coach) =

American football coach (born 1973)

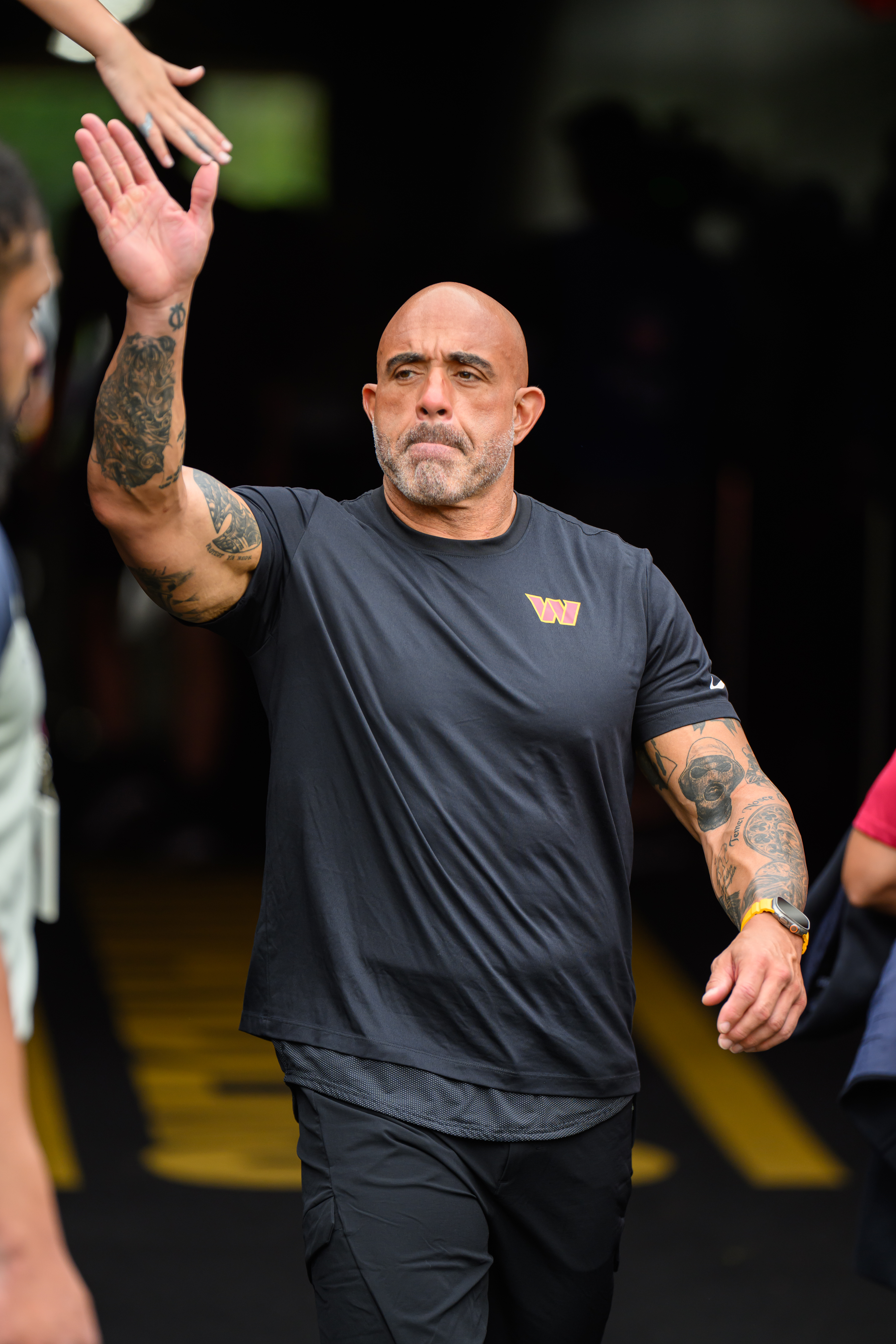
- Johnson with the Washington Commanders in 2025

Cleveland Browns
- Title: Assistant offensive line coach

Personal information
- Born: 1973 (age 52–53); Akron, Ohio, U.S.

Career information
- Position: Offensive tackle
- High school: Hoban (Akron)
- College: Miami (OH) (1991–1995)

Career history
- Akron Zips (1995–1998); Graduate assistant (1995–1996); Defensive line coach (1997–1998); Miami RedHawks (1999–2004); Tight ends coach (1999–2003); Offensive line coach (2004); Indiana Hoosiers (2005–2009) Offensive line coach; Buffalo Bills (2010–2011) Assistant offensive line coach; Jacksonville Jaguars (2012) Tight ends coach; Detroit Lions (2013–2014); Tight ends coach (2013); Assistant offensive line coach (2014); Oakland Raiders (2015–2017) Tight ends coach; Indianapolis Colts (2018) Assistant offensive line coach; Buffalo Bills (2019–2021) Offensive line coach; New York Giants (2022–2023) Offensive line coach; Washington Commanders (2024–2025) Offensive line coach; Cleveland Browns (2026–present) Assistant offensive line coach

Bobby Johnson (born c. 1973) is an American professional football coach. He played college football for the Miami Redhawks. Johnson has served as an assistant coach for the NFL's Buffalo Bills, Indianapolis Colts, Oakland Raiders, Detroit Lions, Jacksonville Jaguars, New York Giants, and Washington Commanders

== Early life and playing career ==
Johnson was born c. 1973 in Akron, Ohio, graduating from Hoban High School in 1991, where he excelled in football as well as track and field. He committed to Miami (Ohio) to play college football, where he was a 3-year starter at offensive tackle. He graduated in 1995 with a degree in health appraisal and sports organization.

== Coaching career ==
=== College career ===
Johnson began his coaching career at Akron as a graduate assistant in 1995. He was promoted to defensive line coach in 1997. In 1999 he returned to his alma mater where he coached the tight ends until 2003. In 2004 he transitioned to offensive line coach. Johnson was hired in 2005 by Indiana, working as the team's offensive line coach through the 2009 season.

=== NFL career ===
Johnson's first NFL coaching position was with the Buffalo Bills as the assistant offensive line coach from 2010-2011. In 2012, he worked as the Jacksonville Jaguars tight ends coach for one season. In 2013, he was hired as the Detroit Lions tight ends coach and in 2014 he was moved to the assistant offensive line coach position. In 2015, he joined the Oakland Raiders as tight ends coach. He spent three seasons in this role, but was not retained after head coach Jack Del Rio was fired after the 2017 season. In January 2018, Johnson was the head coach of the West team in the 2018 East–West Shrine Game. Following that, he was hired as the assistant offensive line coach for the Indianapolis Colts in 2018.

=== Buffalo Bills ===
Between 2019 and 2021, Johnson was the offensive line coach for the Buffalo Bills.

=== New York Giants ===
In 2022, he followed Brian Daboll to New York and became the Giants offensive line coach. He was fired after the 2023 season, where the Giants offensive line gave up a league leading 85 sacks, the second most in NFL history.

=== Washington Commanders ===
On February 15, 2024, Johnson was hired by the Washington Commanders as their offensive line coach under head coach Dan Quinn. He was fired following the 2025 season on January 6, 2026.

=== Cleveland Browns ===
On March 3, 2026, the Cleveland Browns announced the hiring of Johnson as the assistant offensive line coach as part of the staff under new head coach, Todd Monken.
