= 2017 Holiday Bowl =

2017 San Diego County Credit Union Holiday Bowl
- 40th Holiday Bowl
| Washington State Cougars | Michigan State Spartans |
| (9–3) | (9–3) |
| Pac-12 | Big Ten |
| 17 | 42 |
| Head coach: Mike Leach | Head coach: Mark Dantonio |
| AP / Coaches / CFP; 21 / 18 / 18 | AP / Coaches / CFP; 19 / 19 / 16 |
| | 1 | 2 | 3 | 4 | Total |
|---|---|---|---|---|---|
| Washington State | 3 | 0 | 7 | 7 | 17 |
| Michigan State | 0 | 21 | 14 | 7 | 42 |
- Date: December 28, 2017
- Season: 2017
- Stadium: SDCCU Stadium
- Location: San Diego, California
- MVP: Brian Lewerke (QB, Michigan State) & Chris Frey Jr. (LB, Michigan State)
- Favorite: Michigan State by 3
- Referee: Marc Curles (SEC)
- Attendance: 47,092

United States TV coverage
- Network: FS1
- Announcers: Gus Johnson (play-by-play); Joel Klatt (analyst); Jenny Taft (sideline)

The 2017 Holiday Bowl was a postseason college football bowl game, played at SDCCU Stadium in San Diego, California, on December 28, 2017. This was the first time that the Holiday Bowl was played at SDCCU Stadium. Previous to the 2017 season, the Holiday Bowl was played at Qualcomm Stadium. The 40th edition of the Holiday Bowl featured the Washington State Cougars of the Pac-12 Conference versus the Michigan State Spartans of the Big Ten Conference. It was one of the 2017–18 bowl games concluding the 2017 FBS football season. Sponsored by San Diego County Credit Union, the game was officially known as the San Diego County Credit Union Holiday Bowl.

== Teams ==
=== Washington State ===
This was Washington State's fourth appearance in the Holiday Bowl, having lost to #14 Brigham Young in 1981, having defeated #5 Texas in 2003, and having lost to Minnesota in 2016. The Cougars finished the 2017 regular season at 9–3, and were third in the Pac-12 North Division (6–3). The season featured wins against then-#5 USC and then-#18 Stanford.

=== Michigan State ===
This was Michigan State's first appearance in a Holiday Bowl. The Spartans finished the 2017 regular season at 9–3, and were second in the B1G East Division (7–2). The team had upset wins over then-#7 Michigan and then-#7 Penn State. Their three losses were all against teams that finished in the AP Top 20 (#14 Notre Dame, #20 Northwestern and #5 Ohio State).

== Game summary ==
=== Scoring summary ===
Scoring summary

| Quarter | Time | Drive | | | Team | Scoring information | Score | |
| Quarter | Time | Plays | Yards | TOP | Team | Scoring information | WSU | MSU |
|---|---|---|---|---|---|---|---|---|
| 1 | 05:45 | 14 | 64 | 6:05 | WSU | 45-yard field goal by Erik Powell | 3 | 0 |
| 2 | 07:34 | 16 | 81 | 9:24 | MSU | Cody White 15-yard touchdown reception from Brian Lewerke, Matt Coghlin kick good | 3 | 7 |
| 2 | 04:34 | 4 | 63 | 2:03 | MSU | Felton Davis 49-yard touchdown reception from Brian Lewerke, Matt Coghlin kick good | 3 | 14 |
| 2 | 00:29 | 6 | 68 | 2:43 | MSU | LJ Scott 3-yard touchdown run, Matt Coghlin kick good | 3 | 21 |
| 3 | 10:28 | 10 | 67 | 4:32 | MSU | Cody White 10-yard touchdown reception from Brian Lewerke, Matt Coghlin kick good | 3 | 28 |
| 3 | 05:08 | 7 | 27 | 3:47 | MSU | Damion Terry 6-yard touchdown run, Matt Coghlin kick good | 3 | 35 |
| 3 | 02:06 | 7 | 80 | 3:02 | WSU | Davontavean Martin 14-yard touchdown reception from Tyler Hilinski, Erik Powell kick good | 10 | 35 |
| 4 | 08:26 | 9 | 67 | 2:57 | WSU | Davontavean Martin 15-yard touchdown reception from Tyler Hilinski, Erik Powell kick good | 17 | 35 |
| 4 | 06:14 | 4 | 46 | 2:12 | MSU | LJ Scott 28-yard touchdown run, Matt Coghlin kick good | 17 | 42 |
| "TOP" = time of possession. For other American football terms, see Glossary of American football. | | | | | | | 17 | 42 |

=== Statistics ===
| | 1 | 2 | 3 | 4 | Total |
|---|---|---|---|---|---|
| Cougars | 3 | 0 | 7 | 7 | 17 |
| Spartans | 0 | 21 | 14 | 7 | 42 |

| Statistics | WSU | MSU |
|---|---|---|
| First downs | 17 | 25 |
| Plays–yards | 63–296 | 77–440 |
| Rushes–yards | 8–24 | 48–227 |
| Passing yards | 272 | 213 |
| Passing: Comp–Att–Int | 39-50-1 | 13–22–1 |
| Time of possession | 23:18 | 36:42 |

| Team | Category | Player | Statistics |
|---|---|---|---|
| MSU | Passing | Brian Lewerke | 13/23, 213 yds, 3 TD |
| MSU | Rushing | LJ Scott | 18 car, 110 yds, 2 TD |
| MSU | Receiving | Felton Davis III | 4 rec, 118 yds, TD |
| WSU | Passing | Tyler Hilinski | 39/50, 272 yds, 2 TD, 1 INT |
| WSU | Rushing | James Williams | 3 car, 14 yds |
| WSU | Receiving | James Williams | 10 rec, 65 yds |
