= Tyler Hilinski =

American football player (1996–2018)

- Hilinski's Washington State portrait photo

No. 3
- Position: Quarterback

Personal information
- Born: May 26, 1996; Claremont, California, U.S.
- Died: January 16, 2018 (aged 21); Pullman, Washington, U.S.
- Listed height: 6 ft 3 in (1.91 m)
- Listed weight: 215 lb (98 kg)

Career information
- High school: Notre Dame; Upland
- College: Washington State (2015–2017)
- Stats at ESPN

Tyler Scott Haun Hilinski (May 26, 1996 – January 16, 2018) was an American football quarterback who played college football at Washington State University. He died by suicide following his junior year. An autopsy revealed that he had stage one chronic traumatic encephalopathy (CTE).

== Early life ==
Hilinski was born on May 26, 1996, He was the middle of three children born to Kym and Mark Hilinski. Hilinski and his older brother Kelly grew up playing baseball, but both made the switch to American football before Kelly's freshman year of high school.

Hilinski attended Notre Dame High School in Sherman Oaks, California, before he transferred to Upland High School in Upland, California, prior to his junior year. He played as a quarterback on the high school football team. In his junior year, Hilinski passed for 3,067 yards and 36 touchdowns.

== College career ==
Hilinski enrolled at Washington State University and took a redshirt year in 2015. He became the backup quarterback for the Washington State Cougars in 2016. As a sophomore, Hilinski came off the bench to relieve starting quarterback Luke Falk against the Boise State Broncos, overcoming a 21-point deficit to win the game in triple overtime. He also relieved Falk against the Arizona Wildcats in a loss. Due to an injury to Falk, Hilinski received his first start for the Cougars in the 2017 Holiday Bowl, completing 39 of 50 passes for 272 yards with two touchdowns. He finished the 2017 season completing 130 of 179 passes attempted for 1,176 yards, with seven touchdowns and seven interceptions. He was expected to succeed Falk as the Cougars' starting quarterback in 2018.

== Personal life ==
Tyler's older brother, Kelly, played as a quarterback for Notre Dame High School, Columbia University, Riverside City College and Weber State University. His younger brother, Ryan, played quarterback for the South Carolina Gamecocks and Northwestern Wildcats.

== Death ==
On January 16 2018, after not showing up for practice earlier that day, Hilinski was found dead in his apartment with an apparent self-inflicted gunshot wound to the head. He was 21 years old. According to police, a rifle, which belonged to one of his teammates, was recovered next to him along with a suicide note. The death was officially ruled a suicide. A memorial service was held for Hilinski on January 27, at Damien High School in La Verne, California; approximately 800 people attended. On June 26, 2018, doctors revealed that Hilinski was found to have Stage 1 chronic traumatic encephalopathy, which caused him to have the 'brain of a 65-year-old'.

== Hilinski's Hope Foundation ==
Following Hilinski's death, his family started the foundation "Hilinski's Hope", which aims to raise awareness of mental health issues. The charity supports wellness for student athletes and focuses on challenging any stigma that surrounds mental health by providing education and resources.

== See also ==
- List of gridiron football players who died during their careers
