= 2017 Big Ten Football Championship Game =

2017 Discover Big Ten Football Championship Game
- Conference Championship
- Championship Game Logo
Ohio State Buckeyes	Wisconsin Badgers
(10–2)	(12–0)
27	21
Head coach: Urban Meyer	Head coach: Paul Chryst
AP / Coaches / CFP; 8 / 8 / 8	AP / Coaches / CFP; 3 / 3 / 4
	1	2	3	4	Total
Ohio State	14	7	3	3	27
Wisconsin	7	3	3	8	21
- Date: December 2, 2017
- Season: 2017
- Stadium: Lucas Oil Stadium
- Location: Indianapolis, Indiana
- MVP: J. K. Dobbins
- Favorite: Ohio State by 3.5
- National anthem: Bands of participants
- Referee: Don Willard
- Attendance: 65,886

United States TV coverage
- Network: Fox/Compass Media
- Announcers: Gus Johnson (Play-By-Play), Joel Klatt (Analyst) and Jenny Taft (Sidelines) (FOX); Gregg Daniels (Play-By-Play) and Dale Hellestrae (Analyst) (Compass Media)
- Nielsen ratings: 7.3 (12.9 million viewers)

2017 Big Ten Conference football standings
	Conf.			Overall
Team	W		L	W		L
East Division
No. 5 Ohio State xy$	8	–	1	12	–	2
No. 15 Michigan State	7	–	2	10	–	3
No. 8 Penn State	7	–	2	11	–	2
Michigan	5	–	4	8	–	5
Rutgers	3	–	6	4	–	8
Indiana	2	–	7	5	–	7
Maryland	2	–	7	4	–	8
West Division
No. 7 Wisconsin xy	9	–	0	13	–	1
No. 17 Northwestern	7	–	2	10	–	3
Iowa	4	–	5	8	–	5
Purdue	4	–	5	7	–	6
Nebraska	3	–	6	4	–	8
Minnesota	2	–	7	5	–	7
Illinois	0	–	9	2	–	10
Championship: Ohio State 27, Wisconsin 21
$ – Conference champion; x – Division champion/co-champions; y – Championship game participant; Rankings from AP Poll

The 2017 Big Ten Football Championship Game presented by Discover was played on December 2, 2017, at Lucas Oil Stadium in Indianapolis, Indiana. The seventh annual Big Ten Football Championship Game, it determined the 2017 champion of the Big Ten Conference.

== History ==
The 2017 Championship Game was the seventh in the Big Ten's 122-year history and the fourth to feature the conference's East and West alignment. Last season, the Big Ten Championship Game featured the Penn State Nittany Lions, champions of the East Division and the Wisconsin Badgers, champions of the West Division.

== Teams ==
=== Wisconsin Badgers ===
The #3 Wisconsin Badgers represented the West Division of the Big Ten for the second consecutive year and came into the game with a perfect 12-win season, including signature victories over Iowa and Michigan. Wisconsin and UCF were the only remaining undefeated FBS teams in the nation, after Alabama lost to Auburn the previous week. Many analysts tabbed the Badgers as a lock to the College Football Playoff, even if they were to lose a close game in the Big Ten Championship match. It was Wisconsin's fifth appearance in the title game with other appearances coming in 2011, 2012, 2014 and 2016. Wisconsin is 2–3 in the game with their last wins coming in 2011 and 2012. They are 0–2 against the Buckeyes.

=== Ohio State Buckeyes ===
The #8 Ohio State Buckeyes represented the East Division of the Big Ten and came into the game with an overall record of 10–2 and a conference record of 8–1. Their two losses came from #2 Oklahoma and Iowa, and the team had strong victories over Penn State and Michigan State. It was the Buckeyes' third appearance in the title game with the others coming in 2013 and 2014. Ohio State is 2–1 in the game including a 2–0 against Wisconsin.

== Game summary ==
Scoring summary

Quarter	Time	Drive			Team	Scoring information	Score	
Quarter	Time	Plays	Yards	TOP	Team	Scoring information	Ohio State	Wisconsin
1	6:31	4	96	1:15	OS	Terry McLaurin 84-yard touchdown reception from J. T. Barrett, Sean Nuernburger kick good	7	0
1	2:08	2	3	0:36	UW	Andrew Van Ginkel 9-yard interception return, Rafael Gaglianone kick good	7	7
1	0:59	4	75	1:09	OS	Parris Campbell 54-yard touchdown reception from J.T. Barrett, Sean Nuernburger kick good	14	7
2	11:10	3	82	1:05	OS	J.T. Barrett 1-yard touchdown run, Sean Nuernburger kick good	21	7
2	3:42	4	1	1:51	UW	28-yard field goal by Rafael Gaglianone	21	10
3	10:14	8	50	3:12	UW	46-yard field goal by Rafael Gaglianone	21	13
3	7:25	8	65	2:49	OS	27-yard field goal by Sean Nuernburger	24	13
4	12:39	11	52	4:28	UW	Chris James 1-yard touchdown run, 2-point pass from Alex Hornibrook complete to Troy Fumagalli	24	21
4	5:20	15	72	7:19	OS	20-yard field goal by Sean Nuernburger	27	21
"TOP" = time of possession. For other American football terms, see Glossary of American football.							27	21

=== Statistics ===
Statistics	OS	WIS
First downs	16	16
Total offense yards	449	298
Rushes-yards (net)	238	60
Passing yards (net)	211	238
Passes, Comp-Att-Int	12-26-2	20-41-2
Time of Possession	25:54	34:06
Penalties	5–48	6–55
Turnovers	3	2

== College Football Playoff controversy ==
Wisconsin was upset by the Buckeyes, losing by 6 points. Surprisingly, neither the Badgers nor the Buckeyes would get a playoff spot, despite the former having a 12–1 record (tied for the best in the nation) and the latter having a conference championship. Instead the fourth playoff spot ended up going to Alabama (who would eventually win the national championship game over Georgia). Such a move shocked several pundits, who believed Wisconsin could survive a close loss and still make the playoff at a lower seed. (If Wisconsin won, they would have all but assumed the No. 1 seed.) Wisconsin went undefeated in the regular season, while Clemson and Oklahoma had a sole loss to Syracuse and Iowa State, respectively. Some analysts argued that Ohio State was left out because Penn State, who was a 2-loss conference champion the previous year, was also left out. Conversely, Auburn (who was 10–2) was ranked No. 2 heading into the SEC Championship, and if they won, they would have gotten a bid. This could be viewed as an example of committee bias towards the SEC. Others have argued that Auburn's case was different, as during the regular season, it beat the two teams that would eventually go on to play in the National Championship (Georgia and Alabama).

A similar situation happened in 2015, where Iowa was 12–0 going into the 2015 Big Ten Football Championship Game, before falling to Michigan State and getting knocked out of the playoff. Many fans have argued that the playoff committee has bias against the Big Ten, since the No. 5 seed in 2015, 2016, and 2017 was a Big Ten team.

In the CFP era, until the 2020 season, no conference championship loser made the College Football Playoff. Until then, it was common knowledge that a loss in the Conference Championship Game all but eliminated a team from the top 4 in the final CFP rankings. In 2021 and 2022, Georgia and TCU each lost their conference championship games but still made the Playoff. Georgia lost to Alabama 41–24 but both made the Playoff with 12–1 records (The Bulldogs would get revenge by defeating the Crimson Tide 33–18 in the National Championship). TCU lost to Kansas State 31–28 in overtime but still made the Playoff anyway because they beat the Wildcats 38–28 in the regular season.

== See also ==
- List of Big Ten Conference football champions
