= 2017 Wisconsin Badgers football team =

American college football season

2017 Wisconsin Badgers football

Big Ten West Division champion Orange Bowl champion

Big Ten Championship Game, L 21–27 vs. Ohio State

Orange Bowl, W 34–24 vs. Miami (FL)
- Conference: Big Ten Conference
- West Division

Ranking
- Coaches: No. 6
- AP: No. 7
- Record: 13–1 (9–0 Big Ten)
- Head coach: Paul Chryst (3rd season)
- Offensive coordinator: Joe Rudolph (3rd season)
- Offensive scheme: Pro-style
- Defensive coordinator: Jim Leonhard (1st season)
- Base defense: 3–4
- MVPs: Jack Cichy; Garret Dooley; Joe Ferguson; Lubern Figaro Troy Fumagalli Rachid Ibrahim Leon Jacobs Natrell Jamerson Alec James Chikwe Obaseh Austin Ramesh Conor Sheehy Derrick Tindal
- Captains: Jack Cichy; Michael Deiter; D'Cota Dixon; T. J. Edwards; Troy Fumagalli; Natrell Jamerson; Alec James; Conor Sheehy
- Home stadium: Camp Randall Stadium

Uniform
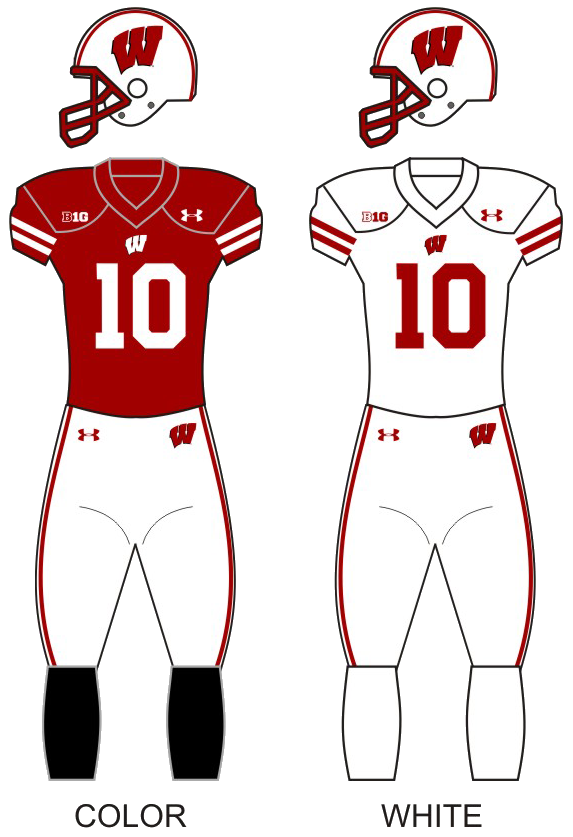

2017 Big Ten Conference football standings
	Conf.			Overall
Team	W		L	W		L
East Division
No. 5 Ohio State xy$	8	–	1	12	–	2
No. 15 Michigan State	7	–	2	10	–	3
No. 8 Penn State	7	–	2	11	–	2
Michigan	5	–	4	8	–	5
Rutgers	3	–	6	4	–	8
Indiana	2	–	7	5	–	7
Maryland	2	–	7	4	–	8
West Division
No. 7 Wisconsin xy	9	–	0	13	–	1
No. 17 Northwestern	7	–	2	10	–	3
Iowa	4	–	5	8	–	5
Purdue	4	–	5	7	–	6
Nebraska	3	–	6	4	–	8
Minnesota	2	–	7	5	–	7
Illinois	0	–	9	2	–	10
Championship: Ohio State 27, Wisconsin 21
$ – Conference champion; x – Division champion/co-champions; y – Championship game participant; Rankings from AP Poll

The 2017 Wisconsin Badgers football team represented the University of Wisconsin–Madison in the 2017 NCAA Division I FBS football season. The Badgers, led by third-year head coach Paul Chryst, were members of the West Division of the Big Ten Conference and played their home games at Camp Randall Stadium in Madison, Wisconsin.

Coming off a Cotton Bowl-winning season in 2016, the 2017 team began the year ranked ninth in the preseason AP Poll and were the favorites to repeat as West Division champions and return to the Big Ten Championship Game. The Badgers fulfilled that expectation by winning all 12 of their regular season games, including wins over ranked opponents Iowa and Michigan. They entered the 2017 Big Ten Championship Game ranked third in the AP Poll, with a potential spot in the College Football Playoff on the line, but fell to No. 8 Ohio State, 21–27. Wisconsin was invited to the Orange Bowl, where they defeated Miami (FL). Their 13 wins were the most in school history.

The Badgers were led on offense by freshman running back Jonathan Taylor, who led the Big Ten and was third in FBS in rushing yards with 1,977 yards. He was named Big Ten Freshman of the Year and first-team All-Big Ten. Quarterback Alex Hornibrook finished with 2,644 passing yards and 25 touchdowns. On defense, linebacker T. J. Edwards was named a first-team All-American by the Associated Press and ESPN.

== Recruiting ==
=== Recruits ===
The Badgers signed a total of 18 recruits.

College recruiting (2017)
Name	Hometown	School	Height	Weight	Commit date
Kayden Lyles; OG	Scottsdale, Arizona	Middleton HS	6 ft 3 in (1.91 m)	323 lb (147 kg)	Oct 1, 2015
Kayden Lyles; OG	Recruit ratings: Scout: Rivals: 247Sports: ESPN:				
Aaron Vopal; DE	De Pere, Wisconsin	De Pere HS	6 ft 7 in (2.01 m)	245 lb (111 kg)	Jan 25, 2016
Aaron Vopal; DE	Recruit ratings: Scout: Rivals: 247Sports: ESPN:				
Logan Bruss; OG	Kimberly, Wisconsin	Kimberly HS	6 ft 4 in (1.93 m)	260 lb (120 kg)	Feb 22, 2016
Logan Bruss; OG	Recruit ratings: Scout: Rivals: 247Sports: ESPN:				
Alex Fenton; TE	Menomonie, Wisconsin	Menomonie HS	6 ft 5 in (1.96 m)	280 lb (130 kg)	Feb 22, 2016
Alex Fenton; TE	Recruit ratings: Scout: Rivals: 247Sports: ESPN:				
Jack Coan; QB	Sayville, New York	Sayville HS	6 ft 3 in (1.91 m)	190 lb (86 kg)	Mar 24, 2016
Jack Coan; QB	Recruit ratings: Scout: Rivals: 247Sports: ESPN:				
Jake Ferguson; TE	Madison, Wisconsin	Memorial HS	6 ft 5 in (1.96 m)	209 lb (95 kg)	Mar 31, 2016
Jake Ferguson; TE	Recruit ratings: Scout: Rivals: 247Sports: ESPN:				
Cade Green; WR	Austin, Texas	Lake Travis HS	5 ft 11 in (1.80 m)	185 lb (84 kg)	Mar 31, 2016
Cade Green; WR	Recruit ratings: Scout: Rivals: 247Sports: ESPN:				
Tyler Beach; OT	Port Washington, Wisconsin	Port Washington HS	6 ft 6 in (1.98 m)	275 lb (125 kg)	Apr 3, 2016
Tyler Beach; OT	Recruit ratings: Scout: Rivals: 247Sports: ESPN:				
Izayah Green-May; DE	Bolingbrook, Illinois	Bolingbrook HS	6 ft 5 in (1.96 m)	205 lb (93 kg)	Apr 23, 2016
Izayah Green-May; DE	Recruit ratings: Scout: Rivals: 247Sports: ESPN:				
Madison Cone; CB	Kernersville, North Carolina	East Forsyth HS	5 ft 9 in (1.75 m)	175 lb (79 kg)	May 6, 2016
Madison Cone; CB	Recruit ratings: Scout: Rivals: 247Sports: ESPN:				
Danny Vanden Boom; QB	Kimberly, Wisconsin	Kimberly HS	6 ft 4 in (1.93 m)	196 lb (89 kg)	Jul 5, 2016
Danny Vanden Boom; QB	Recruit ratings: Scout: Rivals: 247Sports: ESPN:				
Faion Hicks; CB	Pembroke Pines, Florida	Flanagan HS	5 ft 11 in (1.80 m)	180 lb (82 kg)	Oct 16, 2016
Faion Hicks; CB	Recruit ratings: Scout: Rivals: 247Sports: ESPN:				
Adam Bay; LS	Mesa, Arizona	Desert Ridge HS	6 ft 0 in (1.83 m)	210 lb (95 kg)	Oct 30, 2016
Adam Bay; LS	Recruit ratings: Scout: Rivals: 247Sports: ESPN:				
Emmet Perry; WR	DeSoto, Texas	DeSoto HS	6 ft 2 in (1.88 m)	170 lb (77 kg)	Oct 31, 2016
Emmet Perry; WR	Recruit ratings: Scout: Rivals: 247Sports: ESPN:				
Andrew Van Ginkel; DE	Rock Valley, Iowa	Iowa Western Community College	6 ft 4 in (1.93 m)	230 lb (100 kg)	Nov 1, 2016
Andrew Van Ginkel; DE	Recruit ratings: Scout: Rivals: 247Sports: ESPN:				
Jonathan Taylor; RB	Salem, New Jersey	Salem HS	6 ft 0 in (1.83 m)	211 lb (96 kg)	Nov 1, 2016
Jonathan Taylor; RB	Recruit ratings: Scout: Rivals: 247Sports: ESPN:				
Scott Nelson; S	Detroit, Michigan	University of Detroit Jesuit HS	6 ft 2 in (1.88 m)	184 lb (83 kg)	Jan 9, 2017
Scott Nelson; S	Recruit ratings: Scout: Rivals: 247Sports: ESPN:				
Danny Davis; WR	Springfield, Ohio	Springfield HS	6 ft 3 in (1.91 m)	190 lb (86 kg)	Feb 1, 2017
Danny Davis; WR	Recruit ratings: Scout: Rivals: 247Sports: ESPN:				
Overall recruit ranking:
Note: In many cases, Scout, Rivals, 247Sports, On3, and ESPN may conflict in their listings of height and weight.; In these cases, the average was taken. ESPN grades are on a 100-point scale.; Sources: "Wisconsin Football Commitments". Rivals.; "2017 Wisconsin Football Commits". Scout.; "ESPN". ESPN.; "Scout.com Team Recruiting Rankings". Scout.; "2017 Team Ranking". Rivals.com.

== Watchlists and preseason awards ==
- Michael Deiter

Rimington Trophy

- Troy Fumagalli

John Mackey Award

== Schedule ==
Wisconsin's 2017 schedule consisted of seven home and five away games in the regular season. The Badgers hosted Big Ten foes Northwestern, Purdue, Maryland, Iowa, and Michigan, while traveling to Nebraska, Illinois, Indiana, and Minnesota.

The team also played three non-conference games: the Utah State Aggies from the Mountain West Conference (MWC), the Florida Atlantic Owls from Conference USA, and the FBS independent BYU Cougars

Date	Time	Opponent	Rank	Site	TV	Result	Attendance
September 1	8:00 p.m.	Utah State*	No. 9	Camp Randall Stadium; Madison, WI	ESPN	W 59–10	75,324
September 9	11:00 a.m.	Florida Atlantic*	No. 9	Camp Randall Stadium; Madison, WI	BTN	W 31–14	77,542
September 16	2:30 p.m.	at BYU*	No. 10	LaVell Edwards Stadium; Provo, UT	ABC	W 40–6	61,143
September 30	11:00 a.m.	Northwestern	No. 10	Camp Randall Stadium; Madison, WI	ABC	W 33–24	80,584
October 7	7:00 p.m.	at Nebraska	No. 9	Memorial Stadium; Lincoln, NE (Freedom Trophy)	BTN	W 38–17	89,860
October 14	2:30 p.m.	Purdue	No. 7	Camp Randall Stadium; Madison, WI	BTN	W 17–9	78,580
October 21	11:00 a.m.	Maryland^{†}	No. 5	Camp Randall Stadium; Madison, WI	FOX	W 38–13	78,058
October 28	11:00 a.m.	at Illinois	No. 5	Memorial Stadium; Champaign, IL	ESPN	W 24–10	42,101
November 4	11:00 a.m.	at Indiana	No. 9	Memorial Stadium; Bloomington, IN	ABC	W 45–17	43,027
November 11	2:30 p.m.	No. 20 Iowa	No. 8	Camp Randall Stadium; Madison, WI (Heartland Trophy)	ABC	W 38–14	80,462
November 18	11:00 a.m.	No. 24 Michigan	No. 5	Camp Randall Stadium; Madison, WI (College GameDay)	FOX	W 24–10	81,216
November 25	2:30 p.m.	at Minnesota	No. 5	TCF Bank Stadium; Minneapolis, MN (Paul Bunyan's Axe)	ABC	W 31–0	47,327
December 2	7:00 p.m.	vs. No. 8 Ohio State	No. 4	Lucas Oil Stadium; Indianapolis, IN (Big Ten Championship Game)	FOX	L 21–27	65,886
December 30	7:00 p.m.	at No. 10 Miami (FL)*	No. 6	Hard Rock Stadium; Miami Gardens, FL (Orange Bowl)	ESPN	W 34–24	65,032
*Non-conference game; ^{†}Homecoming; Rankings from AP Poll and CFP Rankings after October 31 released prior to game; All times are in Central time

== Game summaries ==
=== Utah State ===
Utah State at No. 9 Wisconsin

Team	1	2	3	4	Total
Aggies	10	0	0	0	10
• No. 9 Badgers	0	10	28	21	59

- Date: September 1
- Location:
  Camp Randall Stadium, Madison, WI
- Game start: 8:05 p.m. CDT
- Elapsed time: 3:20
- Game attendance: 75,324
- Game weather: Temperature: 65, Wind: ESE 6, Weather: Clear
- Referee: D. Willard
- TV announcers (ESPN): Adam Amin (play-by-play), Dusty Dvoracek (color), Molly McGrath (sidelines)

Scoring summary
1	04:56	USU	Dominik Eberle 25 yd field goal, 8 plays, 54 yards, TOP 3:30	3–0 USU
1	03:47	USU	LaJuan Hunt 12 yd run (Dominik Eberle kick), 2 plays, 16 yards, TOP 0:29	10–0 USU
2	01:12	WIS	Bradrick Shaw 3 yd run (R. Gaglianone kick), 15 plays, 79 yards, TOP 8:25	10–7 USU
2	00:00	WIS	R. Gaglianone 29 yd field goal, 4 plays, 7 yards, TOP 1:01	10–10 TIE
3	13:00	WIS	Troy Fumagalli 23 yd pass from Alex Hornibrook (R. Gaglianone kick), 4 plays, 72 yards, TOP 1:55	17–10 WIS
3	11:20	WIS	Zander Neuville 28 yd pass from Alex Hornibrook (R. Gaglianone kick), 3 plays, 53 yards, TOP 1:09	24–10 WIS
3	07:50	WIS	Jonathan Taylor 13 yd run (R. Gaglianone kick), 5 plays, 60 yards, TOP 2:06	31–10 WIS
3	00:51	WIS	Quintez Cephus 21 yd pass from Alex Hornibrook (R. Gaglianone kick), 7 plays, 68 yards, TOP 3:07	38–10 WIS
4	09:26	WIS	Austin Ramesh 6 yd run (R. Gaglianone kick), 7 plays, 88 yards, TOP 3:47	45–10 WIS
4	06:02	WIS	Joe Ferguson 99 yd interception return (R. Gaglianone kick)	52–10 WIS
4	03:52	WIS	Garrett Groshek 23 yd run (R. Gaglianone kick), 4 plays, 37 yards, TOP 1:59	59–10 WIS

Statistical Leaders

- Rushing: Jonathan Taylor – 9 carries, 87 yards (long 41), 9.7 yards/carry, 1 touchdown
- Passing: Alex Hornibrook – 15 completions, 23 passing attempts, 244 yards, 16.3 avg, 3 touchdowns
- Receiving: Troy Fumagalli – 5 receptions, 105 yards (long 44), 21.0 avg, 1 touchdown
- Defense: T. J. Edwards – 7 Tackles (5 solo), 1 tackle-for-loss for 1 yd, 2 pass breakups, 1 interception for 7 yds

=== Florida Atlantic ===
Florida Atlantic at No. 9 Wisconsin

Team	1	2	3	4	Total
Owls	7	7	0	0	14
• No. 9 Badgers	14	10	7	0	31

- Date: September 9
- Location:
  Camp Randall Stadium, Madison, WI
- Game start: 11:00 a.m. CDT
- Elapsed time: 3:08
- Game attendance: 77,542
- Game weather: Temperature: 62, Wind: ESE 9, Weather: Sunny
- Referee: M. Kluczynski
- TV announcers (BTN): Kevin Kugler (play-by-play), Matt Millen (color), Lisa Byington (sidelines)

Scoring summary
1	10:00	WIS	Jonathan Taylor 64 yd run (R. Gaglianone kick), 2 plays, 65 yards, TOP 0:45	7–0 WIS
1	06:40	WIS	Jonathan Taylor 29 yd run (R. Gaglianone kick), 4 plays, 76 yards, TOP 2:00	14–0 WIS
1	03:09	FAU	DeAndre McNeal 63 yd pass from Daniel Parr (Greg Joseph kick), 2 plays, 65 yards, TOP 0:31	14–7 WIS
2	09:05	WIS	Troy Fumagalli 12 yd pass from Alex Hornibrook (R. Gaglianone kick), 4 plays, 39 yards, TOP 1:50	21–7 WIS
2	04:29	FAU	Devin Singletary 1 yd run (Greg Joseph kick), 5 plays, 27 yards, TOP 1:07	21–14 WIS
2	00:02	WIS	R. Gaglianone 20 yd field goal, 13 plays, 75 yards, TOP 1:47	24–14 WIS
3	01:12	WIS	Jonathan Taylor 4 yd run (R. Gaglianone kick), 11 plays, 79 yards, TOP 5:51	31–14 WIS

Statistical Leaders

- Rushing: Jonathan Taylor – 26 carries, 223 yards (long 64), 8.6 yards/carry, 3 touchdowns
- Passing: Alex Hornibrook – 16 completions, 28 passing attempts, 201 yards, 12.6 avg, 1 touchdown, 1 interception
- Receiving: Troy Fumagalli – 8 receptions, 92 yards (long 20), 11.5 avg, 1 touchdown
- Defense: Chris Orr – 8 Tackles (6 solo), 1 tackle-for-loss for 3 yds, 1 sack for loss of 3 yds

=== At BYU ===
No. 10 Wisconsin at BYU

Team	1	2	3	4	Total
• No. 10 Badgers	10	14	7	9	40
Cougars	3	3	0	0	6

- Date: September 16
- Location:
  LaVell Edwards Stadium, Provo, UT
- Game start: 2:36 p.m. CDT
- Elapsed time: 2:59
- Game attendance: 61,143
- Game weather: Temperature: 64, Wind: S 5, Weather: Fair
- Referee: D. Capron
- TV announcers (ABC): Mike Patrick (play-by-play), Tommy Tuberville (color), Paul Carceterra (sidelines)

Scoring summary
1	09:41	WIS	R. Gaglianone 23 yd field goal, 7 plays, 31 yards, TOP 3:56	3–0 WIS
1	02:47	BYU	R. Almond 31 yd field goal, 14 plays, 61 yards, TOP 6:54	3–3 TIE
1	00:00	WIS	Jonathan Taylor 1 yd run (R. Gaglianone kick), 6 plays, 75 yards, TOP 2:47	10–3 WIS
2	07:55	WIS	Quintez Cephus 9 yd pass from Alex Hornibrook (R. Gaglianone kick), 9 plays, 68 yards, TOP 5:17	17–3 WIS
2	00:25	WIS	Quintez Cephus 15 yd pass from Alex Hornibrook (R. Gaglianone kick), 10 plays, 83 yards, TOP 4:40	24–3 WIS
2	00:00	BYU	R. Almond 32 yd field goal, 5 plays, 60 yards, TOP 0:25	24–6 WIS
3	02:59	WIS	A.J. Taylor 18 yd pass from Alex Hornibrook (R. Gaglianone kick), 7 plays, 78 yards, TOP 4:24	31–6 WIS
4	07:00	WIS	Troy Fumagalli 19 yd pass from Alex Hornibrook (R. Gaglianone kick), 10 plays, 34 yards, TOP 6:34	38–6 WIS
4	06:41	WIS	TEAM safety, 0 plays, 0 yards, TOP 0:00	40–6 WIS

Statistical Leaders

- Rushing: Jonathan Taylor – 18 carries, 128 yards (long 18), 7.1 yards/carry, 1 touchdown
- Passing: Alex Hornibrook – 18 completions, 19 passing attempts, 256 yards, 14.2 avg, 4 touchdowns
- Receiving: Quintez Cephus – 5 receptions, 54 yards (long 16), 10.8 avg, 2 touchdowns
- Defense: Dontye Carriere-Williams – 8 Tackles (6 solo), 1 interception for 0 yds

=== Northwestern ===
Northwestern at No. 10 Wisconsin

Team	1	2	3	4	Total
Wildcats	3	7	0	14	24
• No. 10 Badgers	7	0	14	12	33

- Date: September 30
- Location:
  Camp Randall Stadium, Madison, WI
- Game start: 11:06 a.m. CDT
- Elapsed time: 3:15
- Game attendance: 80,584
- Game weather: Temperature: 61, Wind: SE 6, Weather: Sunny
- Referee: D. Capron
- TV announcers (ABC): Bob Wischusen (play-by-play), Brock Huard (color), Allison Williams (sidelines)

Scoring summary
1	13:25	NU	C. Kuhbander 34 yd field goal, 4 plays, 8 yards, TOP 1:27	3–0 NU
1	04:13	WIS	Jonathan Taylor 1 yd run (R. Gaglianone kick), 7 plays, 47 yards, TOP 3:48	7–3 WIS
2	02:38	NU	Cameron Green 1 yd pass from Clayton Thorson (R. Kuhbander kick), 12 plays, 44 yards, TOP 6:38	10–7 NU
3	09:16	WIS	Jonathan Taylor 11 yd run (R. Gaglianone kick), 4 plays, 79 yards, TOP 1:59	14–10 WIS
3	05:26	WIS	Danny Davis 5 yd pass from Alex Hornibrook (R. Gaglianone kick), 4 plays, 38 yards, TOP 1:42	21–10 WIS
4	11:12	WIS	R. Gaglianone 23 yd field goal, 7 plays, 38 yards, TOP 3:41	24–10 WIS
4	09:54	WIS	Natrell Jamerson 36 yd interception return (R. Gaglianone kick), 0 plays, 0 yards, TOP 0:00	31–10 WIS
4	04:46	NU	Ramaud Bowman 2 yd pass from Clayton Thorson (R. Kuhbander kick), 13 plays, 75 yards, TOP 5:08	31–17 WIS
4	02:53	NU	G. Dickerson 5 yd pass from Clayton Thorson (R. Kuhbander kick), 7 plays, 55 yards, TOP 1:28	31–24 WIS
4	00:58	WIS	D'Cota Dixon 9 yd sack, TEAM safety, 0 plays, 0 yards, TOP 0:00	33–24 WIS

Statistical Leaders

- Rushing: Jonathan Taylor – 19 carries, 80 yards (long 11), 4.2 yards/carry, 2 touchdowns
- Passing: Alex Hornibrook – 11 completions, 20 passing attempts, 197 yards, 17.9 avg, 1 touchdown, 2 interceptions
- Receiving: Quintez Cephus – 4 receptions, 99 yards (long 61), 24.6 avg
- Defense: Garret Dooley – 9 Tackles (3 solo), 5 tackles-for-loss for 20 yds, 3.5 sacks for loss of 17 yds

=== At Nebraska ===
No. 9 Wisconsin at Nebraska

Team	1	2	3	4	Total
• No. 9 Badgers	10	7	7	14	38
Cornhuskers	0	10	7	0	17

- Date: October 7
- Location:
  Memorial Stadium, Lincoln, NE
- Game start: 7:11 p.m. CDT
- Elapsed time: 3:10
- Game attendance: 89,860
- Game weather: Temperature: 69, Wind: SW 7, Weather: Clear
- Referee: J. Servinski
- TV announcers (BTN): Kevin Kugler (play-by-play), Matt Millen (color), Lisa Byington (sidelines)

Scoring summary
1	12:34	WIS	Chris Orr 36 yd interception return (R. Gaglianone kick), 0 plays, 0 yards, TOP 0:00	7–0 WIS
1	03:31	WIS	R. Gaglianone 37 yd field goal, 11 plays, 61 yards, TOP 5:47	10–0 WIS
2	01:20	NEB	Stanley Morgan 80 yd pass from Tanner Lee (Drew Brown kick), 1 plays, 80 yards, TOP 0:12	10–7 WIS
2	01:09	WIS	Jonathan Taylor 75 yd run (R. Gaglianone kick), 1 plays, 75 yards, TOP 0:11	17–7 WIS
2	00:00	NEB	Drew Brown 32 yd field goal, 11 plays, 60 yards, TOP 1:04	17–10 WIS
3	10:43	NEB	Aaron Williams 14 yd interception return (Drew Brown kick), 0 plays, 0 yards, TOP 0:00	17–17 TIE
3	04:56	WIS	Quintez Cephus 5 yd pass from Alex Hornibrook (R. Gaglianone kick), 10 plays, 93 yards, TOP 5:42	24–17 WIS
4	09:08	WIS	Jonathan Taylor 2 yd run (R. Gaglianone kick), 10 plays, 80 yards, TOP 5:45	31–17 WIS
4	02:40	WIS	Bradrick Shaw 1 yd run (R. Gaglianone kick), 10 plays, 40 yards, TOP 6:15	38–17 WIS

Statistical Leaders

- Rushing: Jonathan Taylor – 25 carries, 249 yards (long 75), 10.0 yards/carry, 2 touchdowns
- Passing: Alex Hornibrook – 9 completions, 17 passing attempts, 113 yards, 12.6 avg, 1 touchdown, 1 interception
- Receiving: Quintez Cephus – 4 receptions, 68 yards (long 31), 17.0 avg, 1 touchdown
- Defense: D'Cota Dixon – 9 Tackles (6 solo), 1 pass breakup

=== Purdue ===
Purdue at No. 7 Wisconsin

Team	1	2	3	4	Total
Boilermakers	3	3	3	0	9
• No. 7 Badgers	14	3	0	0	17

- Date: October 14
- Location:
  Camp Randall Stadium, Madison, WI
- Game start: 2:40 p.m. CDT
- Elapsed time: 3:07
- Game attendance: 78,580
- Game weather: Temperature: 59, Wind: E 9, Weather: Light rain
- Referee: J. O'Neill
- TV announcers (BTN): Kevin Kugler (play-by-play), Matt Millen (color), Lisa Byington (sidelines)

Scoring summary
1	13:35	WIS	Jonathan Taylor 67 yd run (R. Gaglianone kick), 3 plays, 75 yards, TOP 1:25	7–0 WIS
1	06:12	WIS	Quintez Cephus 14 yd pass from Alex Hornibrook (R. Gaglianone kick), 9 plays, 73 yards, TOP 5:46	14–0 WIS
1	01:14	PUR	Spencer Evans 36 yd field goal, 11 plays, 56 yards, TOP 4:58	14–3 WIS
2	02:38	WIS	R. Gaglianone 46 yd field goal, 8 plays, 47 yards, TOP 4:21	17–3 WIS
2	00:00	PUR	Spencer Evans 49 yd field goal, 11 plays, 43 yards, TOP 2:38	17–6 WIS
3	04:07	PUR	J.D. Dellinger 40 yd field goal, 4 plays, 5 yards, TOP 1:26	17–9 WIS

Statistical Leaders

- Rushing: Jonathan Taylor – 30 carries, 219 yards (long 67), 7.3 yards/carry, 1 touchdown
- Passing: Alex Hornibrook – 13 completions, 18 passing attempts, 199 yards, 15.3 avg, 1 touchdown, 2 interceptions
- Receiving: Quintez Cephus – 5 receptions, 100 yards (long 41), 20.0 avg, 1 touchdown
- Defense: Leon Jacobs – 9 Tackles (4 solo), 0.5 tackle-for-loss for 1 yd, 1 interception for 2 yds, 1 QB hurry

=== Maryland ===
Maryland at No. 5 Wisconsin

Team	1	2	3	4	Total
Terrapins	0	3	10	0	13
• No. 5 Badgers	7	14	7	10	38

- Date: October 21
- Location:
  Camp Randall Stadium, Madison, WI
- Game start: 11:05 a.m. CDT
- Elapsed time: 3:16
- Game attendance: 78,058
- Game weather: Temperature: 62, Wind: S 15, Weather: Partly cloudy
- Referee: M. Cannon
- TV announcers (FOX): Joe Davis (play-by-play), Brady Quinn (color), Bruce Feldman (sidelines)

Scoring summary
1	12:18	WIS	T.J. Edwards 54 yd interception return (R. Gaglianone kick), 0 plays, 0 yards, TOP 0:00	7–0 WIS
2	14:52	UMD	H. Darmstadter 23 yd field goal, 4 plays, 0 yards, TOP 0:27	7–3 WIS
2	10:02	WIS	Jonathan Taylor 3 yd run (R. Gaglianone kick), 10 plays, 70 yards, TOP 4:45	14–3 WIS
2	00:32	WIS	Zander Neuville 8 yd pass from Alex Hornibrook (R. Gaglianone kick), 12 plays, 85 yards, TOP 5:32	21–3 WIS
3	11:15	WIS	A.J. Taylor 18 yd pass from Alex Hornibrook (R. Gaglianone kick), 8 plays, 71 yards, TOP 3:36	28–3 WIS
3	06:50	UMD	T. Jacobs 10 yd pass from Bortenschlager (H. Darmstadter kick), 11 plays, 73 yards, TOP 4:19	28–10 WIS
3	00:29	UMD	H. Darmstadter 45 yd field goal, 13 plays, 57 yards, TOP 3:46	28–13 WIS
4	00:00	WIS	Austin Ramesh 1 yd run (R. Gaglianone kick), 11 plays, 76 yards, TOP 6:13	35–13 WIS
4	00:36	WIS	R. Gaglianone 33 yd field goal, 9 plays, 57 yards, TOP 5:28	38–13 WIS

Statistical Leaders

- Rushing: Jonathan Taylor – 22 carries, 126 yards (long 15), 5.7 yards/carry, 1 touchdown
- Passing: Alex Hornibrook – 16 completions, 24 passing attempts, 225 yards, 14.1 avg, 2 touchdowns, 1 interception
- Receiving: Troy Fumagalli – 7 receptions, 83 yards (long 20), 11.9 avg
- Defense: T. J. Edwards – 5 Tackles (3 solo), 1 interception return 54 yds for a touchdown, 1 pass breakup

=== At Illinois ===
No. 5 Wisconsin at Illinois

Team	1	2	3	4	Total
• No. 5 Badgers	7	10	0	7	24
Fighting Illini	0	3	0	7	10

- Date: October 28
- Location:
  Memorial Stadium, Champaign, IL
- Game start: 11:01 a.m. CDT
- Elapsed time: 3:09
- Game attendance: 42,101
- Game weather: Temperature: 39, Wind: W 14, Weather: Cloudy
- Referee: J. McGinn
- TV announcers (ESPN): Mike Patrick (play-by-play), Tommy Tuberville (color), Paul Carceterra (sidelines)

Scoring summary
1	00:07	WIS	Alec Ingold 1 yd run (R. Gaglianone kick), 15 plays, 92 yards, TOP 8:05	7–0 WIS
2	07:07	WIS	Garrett Groshek 2 yd run (R. Gaglianone kick), 7 plays, 50 yards, TOP 3:13	14–0 WIS
2	00:39	ILL	C. McLaughlin 28 yd field goal, 13 plays, 65 yards, TOP 6:28	14–3 WIS
2	00:00	WIS	R. Gaglianone 52 yd field goal, 5 plays, 36 yards, TOP 0:39	17–3 WIS
4	03:54	WIS	Michael Deiter 4 yd run (R. Gaglianone kick), 8 plays, 57 yards, TOP 4:42	24–3 WIS
4	00:49	ILL	K. Foster 3 yd run (C. McLaughlin kick), 9 plays, 75 yards, TOP 3:05	24–10 WIS

Statistical Leaders

- Rushing: Jonathan Taylor – 12 carries, 73 yards (long 29), 6.1 yards/carry
- Passing: Alex Hornibrook – 10 completions, 19 passing attempts, 135 yards, 13.5 avg, 1 interception
- Receiving: Kendric Pryor – 2 receptions, 37 yards (long 19), 18.5 avg
- Defense: Garret Dooley – 5 Tackles (3 solo), 1 tackle-for-loss for 6 yds, 1 sack for 6 yd loss, 1 forced fumble, 1 pass breakup

=== At Indiana ===
No. 4 Wisconsin at Indiana

Team	1	2	3	4	Total
• No. 4 Badgers	0	14	10	21	45
Hoosiers	7	3	7	0	17

- Date: November 4
- Location:
  Memorial Stadium, Bloomington, IN
- Game start: 11:06 a.m. CDT
- Elapsed time: 3:15
- Game attendance: 43,027
- Game weather: Temperature: 51, Wind: SE 8, Weather: Cloudy
- Referee: J. Servinski
- TV announcers (ABC): Dave Pasch (play-by-play), Greg McElroy (color), Tom Luginbill (sidelines)

Scoring summary
1	03:57	IND	D. Williams 23 yd pass from Richard Lagow (Griffin Oakes kick), 11 plays, 80 yards, TOP 4:09	7–0 IND
2	14:11	IND	Griffin Oakes 26 yd field goal, 8 plays, 55 yards, TOP 2:47	10–0 IND
2	10:28	WIS	Alec Ingold 18 yd pass from Alex Hornibrook (R. Gaglianone kick), 7 plays, 73 yards, TOP 3:43	10–7 IND
2	06:21	WIS	Quintez Cephus 8 yd pass from Alex Hornibrook (R. Gaglianone kick), 2 plays, 21 yards, TOP 0:41	14–10 WIS
3	09:04	WIS	R. Gaglianone 21 yd field goal, 11 plays, 72 yards, TOP 5:56	17–10 WIS
3	05:47	WIS	Jonathan Taylor 32 yd run (R. Gaglianone kick), 4 plays, 54 yards, TOP 1:52	24–10 WIS
3	04:12	IND	Simmie Cobbs 17 yd pass from Richard Lagow (Griffin Oakes kick), 6 plays, 65 yards, TOP 1:35	24–17 WIS
4	10:15	WIS	Alec Ingold 1 yd run (R. Gaglianone kick), 7 plays, 27 yards, TOP 3:31	31–17 WIS
4	05:19	WIS	Alec Ingold 1 yd run (R. Gaglianone kick), 8 plays, 33 yards, TOP 4:51	38–17 WIS
4	02:19	WIS	Bradrick Shaw 1 yd run (R. Gaglianone kick), 4 plays, 16 yards, TOP 2:03	45–17 WIS

Statistical Leaders

- Rushing: Jonathan Taylor – 29 carries, 183 yards (long 45), 6.3 yards/carry, 1 touchdown
- Passing: Alex Hornibrook – 13 completions, 20 passing attempts, 158 yards, 12.2 avg, 2 touchdowns, 1 interception
- Receiving: Kendric Pryor – 3 receptions, 63 yards (long 32), 21.0 avg
- Defense: Nick Nelson – 5 Tackles (5 solo), 1 tackle-for-loss for 3 yds, 4 pass breakups

=== Iowa ===
No. 25 Iowa at No. 6 Wisconsin

Team	1	2	3	4	Total
No. 25 Hawkeyes	7	0	7	0	14
• No. 6 Badgers	3	14	7	14	38

- Date: November 11
- Location:
  Camp Randall Stadium, Madison, WI
- Game start: 2:36 p.m. CST
- Elapsed time: 3:14
- Game attendance: 80,462
- Game weather: Temperature: 30, Wind: S 9, Weather: Cloudy
- Referee: J. O'Neill
- TV announcers (ABC): Joe Tessitore (play-by-play), Todd Blackledge (color), Holly Rowe (sidelines)

Scoring summary
1	13:30	IOWA	Joshua Jackson 43 yd interception return (Miguel Recinos kick), 0 plays, 0 yards, TOP 0:00	7–0 IOWA
1	05:43	WIS	R. Gaglianone 23 yd field goal, 14 plays, 75 yards, TOP 7:40	7–3 IOWA
2	08:55	WIS	Kendric Pryor 25 yd run (R. Gaglianone kick), 5 plays, 51 yards, TOP 2:18	10–7 WIS
2	01:19	WIS	Kendric Pryor 12 yd pass from Alex Hornibrook (R. Gaglianone kick), 3 plays, 26 yards, TOP 1:15	17–7 WIS
3	11:18	IOWA	Joshua Jackson 52 yd interception return (Miguel Recinos kick), 0 plays, 0 yards, TOP 0:00	17–14 WIS
3	06:10	WIS	Leon Jacobs 21 yd fumble return (R. Gaglianone kick), 0 plays, 0 yards, TOP 0:00	24–14 WIS
4	11:05	WIS	Bradrick Shaw 8 yd run (R. Gaglianone kick), 8 plays, 59 yards, TOP 4:13	31–14 WIS
4	07:02	WIS	A.J. Taylor 5 yd pass from Alex Hornibrook (R. Gaglianone kick), 5 plays, 14 yards, TOP 3:51	38–14 WIS

Statistical Leaders

- Rushing: Jonathan Taylor – 29 carries, 157 yards (long 19), 5.4 yards/carry
- Passing: Alex Hornibrook – 11 completions, 18 passing attempts, 135 yards, 12.3 avg, 2 touchdowns, 3 interceptions
- Receiving: Danny Davis – 4 receptions, 74 yards (long 28), 18.5 avg
- Defense: Ryan Connelly – 9 Tackles (6 solo), 2 tackles-for-loss for 14 yds, 1 sack for loss 12 yds, 1 forced fumble, 1 QB hurry

=== Michigan ===
No. 19 Michigan at No. 5 Wisconsin

Team	1	2	3	4	Total
No. 19 Wolverines	0	7	3	0	10
• No. 5 Badgers	7	0	14	3	24

- Date: November 18
- Location:
  Camp Randall Stadium, Madison, WI
- Game start: 11:05 a.m. CST
- Elapsed time: 3:30
- Game attendance: 81,216
- Game weather: Temperature: 37, Wind: N 14, Weather: Cloudy
- Referee: M. Cannon
- TV announcers (FOX): Gus Johnson (play-by-play), Joel Klatt (color), Jenny Taft (sidelines)

Scoring summary
1	01:15	WIS	Nick Nelson 50 yd punt return (R. Gaglianone kick), 0 plays, 0 yards, TOP 0:00	7–0 WIS
2	02:24	MICH	Ben Mason 1 yd run (Quinn Nordin kick), 7 plays, 84 yards, TOP 3:34	7–7 TIE
3	06:36	MICH	Quinn Nordin 39 yd field goal, 5 plays, 8 yards, TOP 1:57	10–7 MICH
3	03:31	WIS	A.J. Taylor 24 yd pass from Alex Hornibrook (R. Gaglianone kick), 7 plays, 77 yards, TOP 3:01	14–10 WIS
3	00:24	WIS	Kendric Pryor 32 yd run (R. Gaglianone kick), 5 plays, 61 yards, TOP 1:42	21–10 WIS
4	02:25	WIS	R. Gaglianone 30 yd field goal, 10 plays, 40 yards, TOP 5:17	24–10 WIS

Statistical Leaders

- Rushing: Jonathan Taylor – 19 carries, 132 yards (long 52), 6.9 yards/carry
- Passing: Alex Hornibrook – 9 completions, 19 passing attempts, 143 yards, 15.9 avg, 1 touchdown, 1 interception
- Receiving: A. J. Taylor – 3 receptions, 79 yards (long 51), 26.3 avg, 1 touchdown
- Defense: T. J. Edwards – 11 Tackles (7 solo), 2.5 tackles-for-loss for 12 yds, 1 sack for loss 10 yds, 1 pass breakup, 1 QB hurry

=== At Minnesota ===
No. 5 Wisconsin at Minnesota

Team	1	2	3	4	Total
• No. 5 Badgers	7	10	7	7	31
Golden Gophers	0	0	0	0	0

- Date: November 25
- Location:
  TCF Bank Stadium, Minneapolis, MN
- Game start: 2:36 p.m. CST
- Elapsed time: 2:44
- Game attendance: 47,327
- Game weather: Temperature: 40, Wind: WNW 12, Weather: Sunny
- Referee: J. McGinn
- TV announcers (ABC): Mark Jones (play-by-play), Rod Gilmore (color), Quint Kessenich (sidelines)

Scoring summary
1	00:24	WIS	Troy Fumagalli 1 yd pass from Alex Hornibrook (R. Gaglianone kick), 12 plays, 73 yards, TOP 6:09	7–0 WIS
2	09:08	WIS	R. Gaglianone 32 yd field goal, 9 plays, 63 yards, TOP 4:27	10–0 WIS
2	00:50	WIS	Kyle Penniston 5 yd pass from Alex Hornibrook, 7 plays, 79 yards, TOP 3:10	17–0 WIS
3	06:06	WIS	Danny Davis 5 yd pass from Alex Hornibrook (R. Gaglianone kick), 8 plays, 80 yards, TOP 4:39	24–0 WIS
4	14:51	WIS	Jonathan Taylor 53 yd run (R. Gaglianone kick), 3 plays, 70 yards, TOP 1:29	31–0 WIS

Statistical Leaders

- Rushing: Jonathan Taylor – 20 carries, 149 yards (long 53), 7.5 yards/carry, 1 touchdown
- Passing: Alex Hornibrook – 15 completions, 19 passing attempts, 151 yards, 10.1 avg, 3 touchdowns
- Receiving: Danny Davis – 5 receptions, 41 yards (long 10), 8.2 avg, 1 touchdown
- Defense: Ryan Connelly – 6 Tackles (5 solo), 3.0 tackles-for-loss for 26 yds, 2 sacks for loss 24 yds

=== Vs. Ohio State ===
No. 8 Ohio State vs. No. 3 Wisconsin

Team	1	2	3	4	Total
• No. 8 Buckeyes	14	7	3	3	27
No. 3 Badgers	7	3	3	8	21

- Date: December 2
- Location:
  Lucas Oil Stadium, Indianapolis, IN
- Game start: 7:20 p.m. CST
- Elapsed time: 3:43
- Game attendance: 65,886
- Game weather: Indoors
- Referee: D. Willard
- TV announcers (FOX): Gus Johnson (Play-By-Play), Joel Klatt (Analyst) and Jenny Taft (Sidelines)

Scoring summary
1	06:31	OSU	Terry McLaurin 84 yd pass from J. T. Barrett (S. Nuernberger kick), 4 plays, 96 yards, TOP 1:15	7–0 OSU
1	02:08	WIS	Andrew Van Ginkel 9 yd interception return, 0 plays, 0 yards, TOP 0:00	7–7 TIE
1	00:59	OSU	P. Campbell 57 yd pass from J.T. Barrett (S. Nuernberger kick), 4 plays, 75 yards, TOP 1:09	14–7 OSU
2	11:10	OSU	J.T. Barrett 1 yd run (S. Nuernberger kick), 3 plays, 82 yards, TOP 1:05	21–7 OSU
2	03:42	WIS	R. Gaglianone 28 yd field goal, 4 plays, 1 yards, TOP 1:51	21–10 OSU
3	10:14	WIS	R. Gaglianone 46 yd field goal, 8 plays, 50 yards, TOP 3:12	21–13 OSU
3	07:25	OSU	S. Nuernberger 27 yd field goal, 8 plays, 65 yards, TOP 2:49	24–13 OSU
4	12:39	WIS	Chris James 1 yd run (Troy Fumagalli pass from Alex Hornibrook), 11 plays, 52 yards, TOP 4:28	24–21 OSU
4	05:20	OSU	S. Nuernberger 20 yd field goal, 15 plays, 72 yards, TOP 7:19	27–21 OSU

The No. 3 Wisconsin Badgers (12-1, 9-0) were defeated by the No. 8 Ohio State Buckeyes (11-2, 8-1) 27-21 at Lucas Oil Stadium in the Big Ten Championship. Paul Chryst is now 0-2 versus the Buckeyes, and Urban Meyer is now 5-0 versus the Badgers, though two of the victories came in overtime. This was Wisconsin's fifth appearance in the Championship game, and their second straight and Ohio State's third.

Statistical Leaders

- Rushing: Jonathan Taylor – 15 carries, 41 yards (long 7), 2.7 yards/carry
- Passing: Alex Hornibrook – 19 completions, 40 passing attempts, 229 yards, 12.1 avg, 2 interceptions
- Receiving: Troy Fumagalli – 5 receptions, 45 yards (long 11), 9.0 avg
- Defense: Andrew Van Ginkel – 3 Tackles (1 solo), 1 forced fumble, 1 fumble recovery, 1 interception returned 9 yds for touchdown

=== Vs. Miami (FL) ===
No. 6 Wisconsin vs. No. 11 Miami

Team	1	2	3	4	Total
• No. 6 Badgers	3	21	3	7	34
No. 11 Hurricanes	14	0	7	3	24

- Date: December 30
- Location:
  Hard Rock Stadium, Miami Gardens, FL
- Game start: 7:11 p.m. CST
- Elapsed time: 3:23
- Game attendance: 65,032
- Game weather: Temperature: 59, Wind: Calm, Weather: Clear
- Referee: M. Loefer
- TV announcers (ESPN): Steve Levy (Play-By-Play), Brian Griese (Analyst), Todd McShay, and Molly McGrath (Sidelines)

== Rankings ==
Ranking movements Legend: ██ Increase in ranking ██ Decrease in ranking ( ) = First-place votes
	Week															
Poll	Pre	1	2	3	4	5	6	7	8	9	10	11	12	13	14	Final
AP	9	9	10	9	10	9	7	5	5	4	6	5	5	3 (10)	6	7
Coaches	10	11	12	10	10	8	6	5	5	4	3	4	4	3 (21)	6	6
CFP	Not released									9	8	5	5	4	6	Not released

== Roster ==
2017 Wisconsin Badgers football team roster
Players
Coaches
Offense

Pos.	#	Name	Class
WR	2	Kendric Pryor	Fr
WR	4	A. J. Taylor	So
RB	5	Chris James	Jr
WR	6	Danny Davis III	Fr
RB	7	Bradrick Shaw	So
RB	9	Rachid Ibrahim	Sr
QB	10	Jack Coan	Fr
WR	11	Jazz Peavy (injured)	Sr
QB	12	Alex Hornibrook	So
QB	15	Danny Vanden Boom	Fr
WR	16	Jack Dunn	Fr
WR	17	George Rushing	Sr
QB	19	Karé Lyles	Fr
FB	20	Austin Ramesh	Sr
RB	21	Mark Saari	Jr
WR	22	Cade Green	Fr
RB	23	Jonathan Taylor	Fr
WR	24	Adam Krumholz	Fr
RB	28	Taiwan Deal (injured)	Jr
FB	30	Aaron Maternowski	Fr
TE	30	Coy Wanner	Fr
RB	34	Sam Brodner (injured)	Fr
RB	36	Hunter Johnson	Fr
RB	37	Garrett Groshek	Fr
WR	38	Sam DeLany	Fr
FB	39	Jake Whalen (injured)	So
WR	43	Peter Roy	Jr
FB	45	Alec Ingold	Jr
TE	46	Gabe Lloyd	Fr
TE	49	Kyle Penniston	So
OL	52	Jacob Maxwell	Jr
OL	60	Logan Bruss	Fr
OL	61	Tyler Biadasz	Fr
OL	62	Patrick Kasl	Fr
OL	63	Michael Deiter (C)	Jr
OL	64	Brett Connors	Jr
OL	65	Tyler Beach	Fr
OL	66	Beau Benzschawel	Jr
OL	67	Jon Dietzen	So
OL	68	David Moorman	So
OL	70	Josh Seltzner	Fr
OL	71	Cole Van Lanen	Fr
OL	73	Alex Fenton	Fr
OL	75	Micah Kapoi	Jr
OL	76	Kayden Lyles	Fr
OL	77	Blake Smithback	Fr
OL	78	Jason Erdmann	So
OL	79	David Edwards (C)	So
TE	81	Troy Fumagalli (C)	Sr
WR	82	Emmet Perry	Fr
TE	84	Jake Ferguson	Fr
TE	85	Zander Neuville	Jr
TE	86	Luke Benzschawel (injured)	Fr
WR	87	Quintez Cephus (injured)	So
WR	89	Deron Harrell	Fr

Defense

Pos.	#	Name	Class
S	2	Patrick Johnson (injured)	So
OLB	5	Garret Dooley	Sr
S	8	Joe Ferguson	Sr
S	10	Seth Currens	Fr
CB	11	Nick Nelson	Jr
CB	12	Natrell Jamerson (C)	Sr
S	13	Evan Bondoc	Jr
S	14	D'Cota Dixon (C)	Sr
OLB	17	Andrew Van Ginkel	Jr
ILB	18	Arrington Farrar	Jr
CB	19	Titus Booker	So
CB	20	Faion Hicks	Fr
CB	21	Caesar Williams	Fr
ILB	23	Mason Stokke (injured)	Fr
CB	24	Madison Cone	Fr
S	25	Scott Nelson	Fr
CB	25	Derrick Tindal	Sr
S	26	Eric Burrell	Fr
DB	27	Cristian Volpentesta	Fr
S	28	Blake Mielke	So
CB	29	Dontye Carriere-Williams	Fr
S	31	Lubern Figaro	Sr
S	31	Tyler Mais	Fr
ILB	32	Jake Collinsworth	Fr
OLB	32	Leon Jacobs	Sr
DE	34	Chikwe Obasih	Sr
ILB	37	Ethan Cesarz	Fr
OLB	41	Noah Burks	Fr
ILB	43	Ryan Connelly	Jr
OLB	45	Hegeman Tiedt	Fr
ILB	45	Nick Thomas	So
ILB	47	Griffin Grady	So
ILB	48	Jack Cichy (injured) (C)	Sr
OLB	50	Izayah Green-May	Fr
DE	52	David Pfaff	So
ILB	53	T. J. Edwards	Jr
ILB	54	Chris Orr	So
OLB	55	Christian Bell	Fr
OLB	56	Zack Baun (injured)	So
DE	57	Michael Balistreri	Fr
DE	57	Alec James (C)	Sr
ILB	58	Mike Maskalunas	Fr
OLB	59	Tyler Johnson	So
DE	69	Aaron Vopal	Fr
NT	74	Gunnar Roberge	So
DE	93	Garrett Rand	So
DE	94	Matt Henningsen	Fr
DE	94	Conor Sheehy (C)	Sr
OLB	95	Keldric Preston	Fr
DE	96	Billy Hirschfeld	Jr
DE	97	Isaiahh Loudermilk	Fr
DE	98	Kraig Howe	So
NT	99	Olive Sagapolu	Jr

Special teams

Pos.	#	Name	Class
P	15	Anthony Lotti	So
K	27	Rafael Gaglianone	Jr
P	38	P. J. Rosowski (injured)	Jr
K	39	Zach Hintze	So
LS	51	Adam Bay	Fr
P	90	Connor Allen	So
LS	91	Josh Bernhagen	Fr
K	98	Collin Larsh	Fr

Head coach

- Paul Chryst (Wisconsin)
  Also Quarterbacks coach

Coordinators/assistant coaches

- Joe Rudolph (Wisconsin)
  Associate head coach, offensive coordinator, offensive line coach
- Jim Leonhard (Wisconsin)
  Defensive coordinator, defensive backs coach
- Bob Bostad (UW–Stevens Point)
  Inside linebackers
- Inoke Breckterfield (Oregon State)
  Defensive line coach
- Ted Gilmore (Wyoming)
  Passing game coordinator, wide receivers coach
- Chris Haering (West Virginia)
  Special teams coordinator
- John Settle (Appalachian State)
  Running backs coach
- Tim Tibesar (North Dakota)
  Outside linebackers coach
- Mickey Turner (Wisconsin)
  Tight ends coach
- Ross Kolodziej (Wisconsin)
  Strength and conditioning coach
- Antonio Fenelus (Wisconsin)
  Graduate assistant

Legend

- (C) Team captain
- (S) Suspended
- (I) Ineligible
- Injured
- Redshirt

Roster
Last update: August 19, 2017

=== Injuries ===
At the start of the season four players were announced as out for the season due to injury; Senior ILB Jack Cichy (right knee), Freshman ILB Mason Stokke (right leg), Sophomore OLB Zack Baun (left foot), Freshman RB Sam Brodner (right knee).

== 2018 NFL draft ==
2018 NFL draft selections
Round	Pick #	Team	Player	Position
4	110	Oakland Raiders	Nick Nelson	Cornerback
5	156	Denver Broncos	Troy Fumagalli	Tight end
5	164	New Orleans Saints	Natrell Jamerson	Safety
6	202	Tampa Bay Buccaneers	Jack Cichy	Linebacker
7	230	Jacksonville Jaguars	Leon Jacobs	Defensive end

=== Signed undrafted free agents ===
- Garret Dooley, LB, Minnesota Vikings
- Alec James, DE, Arizona Cardinals
- Austin Ramesh, FB, Arizona Cardinals
- Connor Sheehy, DE, Green Bay Packers
