= DeeJay Dallas =

American football player (born 1998)

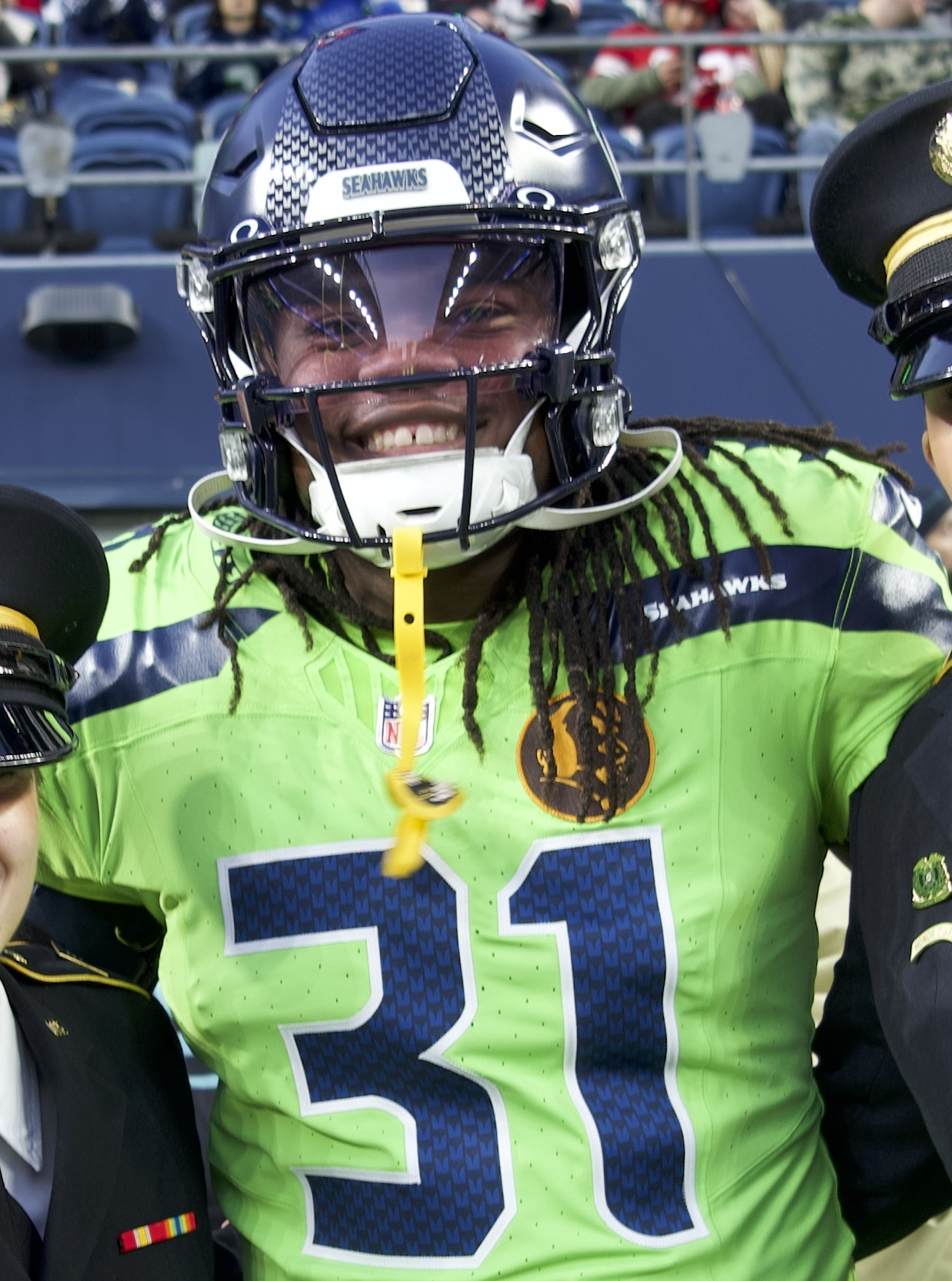
- Dallas with the Seattle Seahawks in 2023

No. 31 – Minnesota Vikings
- Position: Running back
- Roster status: Active

Personal information
- Born: September 16, 1998 (age 28); Brunswick, Georgia, U.S.
- Listed height: 5 ft 10 in (1.78 m)
- Listed weight: 225 lb (102 kg)

Career information
- High school: Glynn Academy (Brunswick, Georgia)
- College: Miami (FL) (2017–2019)
- NFL draft: 2020: 4th round, 144th overall pick

Career history
- Seattle Seahawks (2020–2023); Arizona Cardinals (2024); Carolina Panthers (2025); Jacksonville Jaguars (2025); Minnesota Vikings (2026–present)

Career NFL statistics as of Week 10, 2026
- Rushing yards: 552
- Rushing average: 4.3
- Rushing touchdowns: 4
- Receptions: 69
- Receiving yards: 443
- Receiving touchdowns: 2
- Return yards: 2,621
- Return touchdowns: 1
- Stats at Pro Football Reference

Demetrius "DeeJay" Dallas Jr. (born September 16, 1998) is an American professional football running back for the Minnesota Vikings of the National Football League (NFL). He played college football for the Miami Hurricanes and was selected by the Seattle Seahawks in the fourth round of the 2020 NFL draft.

== Early life ==
Demetrius Dallas Jr. was born in Brunswick, Georgia, on September 16, 1998. He attended Glynn Academy in Brunswick, becoming a starter at wide receiver on the football team in his sophomore year. He played all over the field while in high school, at wide receiver, running back, quarterback, kick returner, punt returner, and even on defense. He was named a first-team all-region 3-5A wide receiver in his sophomore year. As a junior, Dallas led Glynn Academy to a Class 5A State Championship appearance for the first time in over 50 years, amassing 678 passing yards, 1,139 rushing yards, 147 receiving yards and 22 total touchdowns over the course of the season and being named region 3-5A player of the year. In his senior season, he amassed 911 passing yards, 1,201 rushing yards, 105 receiving yards, and 24 total touchdowns, while bringing Glynn Academy to the state quarter-finals and being named region 3-5A player of the year again. Throughout his high school career, Dallas amassed a total of 1,599 passing yards, 2,502 rushing yards, 779 receiving yards, 430 return yards and 55 touchdowns.

Dallas was considered one of the top recruits coming out of high school, claiming a spot in the top-300 players of the class of 2017 by ESPN. Because of his versatility on the field, Dallas was listed as an athlete, but most experts thought he would do best as a wide receiver or defensive back. Most recruiting websites had Dallas as a four-star athlete. Dallas had offers from Georgia, Alabama, and others, but ultimately chose to play at Miami under head coach Mark Richt.

College recruiting
Name	Hometown	School	Height	Weight	40^{‡}	Commit date
DeeJay Dallas; Athlete	Brunswick, GA	Glynn Academy	5 ft 10.5 in (1.79 m)	191 lb (87 kg)	4.52	May 21, 2016
DeeJay Dallas; Athlete	Recruit ratings: Scout: Rivals: 247Sports: ESPN: (81)					
Overall recruit ranking: Rivals: 16 (ATH), 196 overall 247Sports: 12 (ATH), 255 overall ESPN: 16 (ATH), 231 overall
Note: In many cases, Scout, Rivals, 247Sports, On3, and ESPN may conflict in their listings of height and weight.; In these cases, the average was taken. ESPN grades are on a 100-point scale.; Sources: "2017 Miami Hurricanes Commitment List". Rivals. Archived from the original on March 29, 2023.; "2017 Miami Hurricanes class". ESPN. Archived from the original on June 2, 2023.; "2017 Team Ranking". Rivals.com.; "Miami 2017 Football Commits". 247Sports. Archived from the original on March 15, 2023.

== College career ==
=== Freshman ===
Dallas enrolled early at the University of Miami, on January 17, 2017. Mark Richt and offensive coordinator Thomas Brown had him working out at wide receiver through summer camps but were considering moving him to running back. Before the 2017 season opener vs. Bethune-Cookman, he was listed third on the depth chart at wide receiver. Dallas saw his first action in the same game, recording a single 16-yard catch. For the next few games, Dallas was not very involved in the game plan, only having a couple kick returns and receptions. After a season-ending injury to starting RB Mark Walton, the Hurricanes were in a tough spot because they did not have much depth at the position. Miami looked to Dallas for help, moving him from wide receiver to running back. In Week 10, Dallas had a breakout game vs. #3 Notre Dame. He had 2 touchdowns and 53 yards rushing on 12 carries, helping the Hurricanes blow out the Fighting Irish 41–8. It was only his second week taking meaningful snaps at running back for the Hurricanes. Dallas finished strongly that season, totaling 113 rushing yards and 1 touchdown in the ACC Championship vs. top-ranked Clemson and the Capitol One Orange Bowl vs. sixth-ranked Wisconsin. Dallas finished the season with 217 rushing yards on 41 carries (5.1 yards-per-carry) and 3 touchdowns, as well as 92 receiving yards on 4 receptions.

=== Sophomore ===
During the offseason, Dallas' goal was to bulk up to adequate weight for a running back. He was listed at 200 lbs at the start of his freshman season. Head coach Mark Richt said in an interview in the middle of the previous season: "If he was going to be a running back, he probably would have been 10 pounds heavier.", although complimenting how well he took on the challenge. Dallas ended up succeeding, as he was listed at 220 lbs by the beginning of his second year. At the beginning of his sophomore campaign, Dallas was the second-string running back on the depth chart, behind standout Travis Homer. In the season opener vs 25-ranked LSU, Dallas rushed for a team-high 38 rushing yards on 8 carries (4.8 yards-per-carry) in a 33–17 loss. He had his first 100-yard collegiate game in Week 3 vs. Toledo, where he gained 110 rushing yards on 17 carries (6.5 yards-per-carry) and 1 touchdown. Dallas went on to have two more 100-yard games in Week 5 vs. North Carolina and Week 9 vs. Duke. He also became a reliable special teams returner about halfway through the season, returning it 25 times after Week 5. He even recorded a punt-return touchdown in a Week 12 win over Pittsburgh. While the Hurricanes finished a disappointing 7–6 season, Dallas had a solid season as a second-string running back. On the season, he tallied 617 rushing yards on 109 carries (5.7 yards-per-carry) and 6 touchdowns, as well as 558 return yards and 1 touchdown. Dallas finished with a team-leading 1260 all-purpose yards. He earned 2 team awards in 2018: the Christopher Plumer Memorial Award (Leadership, Motivation, Spirit) and Special Teams MVP.

=== Junior ===
After the previous season, starting running back Travis Homer declared for the 2019 NFL draft, making Dallas the de facto starter for the Hurricanes in 2019. Head coach Mark Richt stepped down soon after the 2018 season, and the Hurricanes appointed defensive coordinator Manny Diaz to fill his place. Diaz hired Dan Enos as offensive coordinator. As Enos had experience with NFL running backs in the past, Dallas had lofty expectations entering his junior season. Most thought his experience in the prior two seasons put him in position for a breakout campaign, especially after recording multiple touchdowns in the Hurricanes' spring game. Dallas hit the ground running at the beginning of the season, amassing 309 rushing yards on 35 carries (8.4 yards-per-carry) and 4 touchdowns over the first 3 games. However, he did not keep his pace for the rest of the season, averaging only 55 yards per game the following 7 weeks and not hitting the 100-yard mark again, partially due to a nagging knee injury that caused him to miss most of Week 7 vs. Georgia Tech and all of Week 8 vs. Pittsburgh. Dallas' season was cut short by a dislocated elbow injury suffered in Week 10 vs. FIU. His injury forced him to miss the final two games of the season. Dallas finished the season with 693 rushing yards on 115 carries (6.0 yards-per-carry) and 8 touchdowns, as well 140 receiving yards and 2 touchdowns. All of his rushing stats were career highs. Dallas was awarded two team awards in 2019: the R. Dale Melching Leadership Award and one of the Captains of the Year.

On December 27, 2019, Dallas announced that he would forgo his final year of eligibility to enter the 2020 NFL draft. He finished his Hurricane career with 1,527 rushing yards on 265 carries (5.8 yards-per-carry), 317 receiving yards on 28 receptions, and 20 total touchdowns.

=== College statistics ===
Season	Team	GP	Rushing					Receiving					Returning					Fumbles	
Season	Team	GP	Att	Yds	Avg	Lng	TD	Rec	Yds	Avg	Lng	TD	Ret	Yds	Avg	Lng	TD	Fum	Lost
2017	Miami (FL)	12	41	217	5.3	39	3	4	92	23.0	49	0	2	40	20.0	22	0	0	0
2018	Miami (FL)	13	109	617	5.7	83	6	10	85	8.5	26	0	28	558	19.9	65	1	4	3
2019	Miami (FL)	10	115	693	6.0	62	8	14	140	10.0	42	2	1	13	13.0	13	0	0	0
Career		35	265	1,527	5.8	83	17	28	317	11.3	49	2	31	611	19.7	65	1	4	3
Source: CBS Sports

== Professional career ==
Pre-draft measurables
Height	Weight	Arm length	Hand span	Wingspan	40-yard dash	10-yard split	20-yard split	20-yard shuttle	Three-cone drill	Vertical jump	Broad jump
5 ft 10 1/8 in (1.78 m)	217 lb (98 kg)	30 5/8 in (0.78 m)	9 1/4 in (0.23 m)	6 ft 2 1/4 in (1.89 m)	4.58 s	1.54 s	2.68 s	4.32 s	7.18 s	33.5 in (0.85 m)	9 ft 11 in (3.02 m)
All values from NFL Combine

=== Seattle Seahawks ===
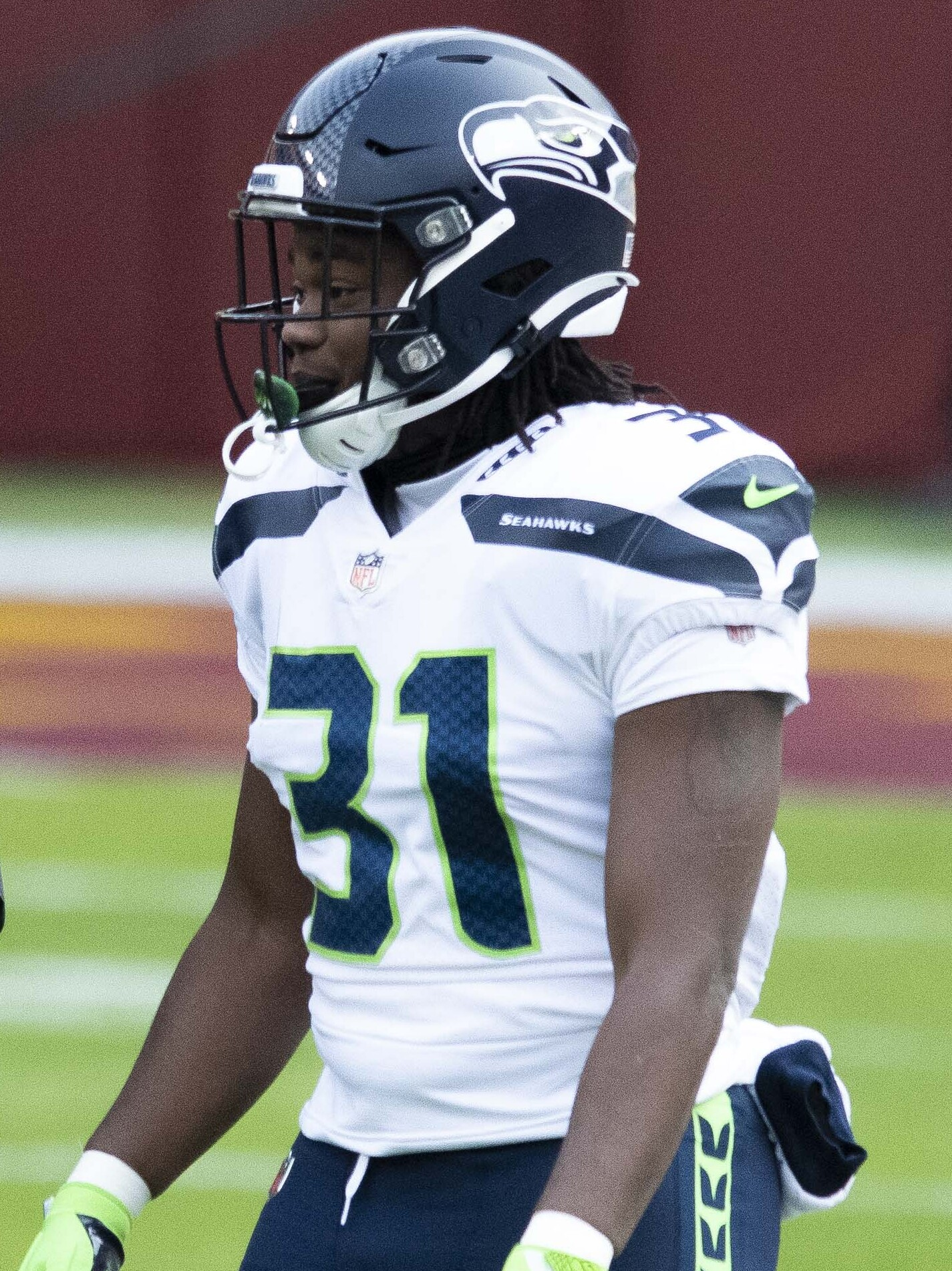
Dallas with the Seattle Seahawks in 2020

Dallas was selected by the Seattle Seahawks in the fourth round with the 144th overall pick in the 2020 NFL draft. The Seahawks signed Dallas to a four-year, $3.789 million contract, including a $494k signing bonus, on July 28, 2020. In Week 3, against the Dallas Cowboys, he made his NFL debut playing on special teams. In Week 4 against the Miami Dolphins, he recorded two carries for eight rushing yards and two receptions for 15 receiving yards for his first NFL scrimmage yards. With injuries to the Seahawks backfield, Dallas got his first career start in Week 8 against the San Francisco 49ers. He had 18 carries for 41 rushing yards and a rushing touchdown to go along with five receptions for 17 receiving yards and a receiving touchdown in the 37–27 victory.

=== Arizona Cardinals ===
On March 14, 2024, Dallas signed a three-year contract with the Arizona Cardinals. On September 8, in a 34–28 loss against the Buffalo Bills, Dallas became the first NFL player to return a dynamic kick for a touchdown and finished with 123 kick return yards.

On August 26, 2025, Dallas was waived by the Cardinals as a part of final roster cuts.

=== Carolina Panthers ===
On August 28, 2025, Dallas was signed to the Carolina Panthers' practice squad. He was signed to the active roster on October 1. In two appearances for Carolina, Dallas recorded one rush attempt for no yards, operating mainly on special teams. On November 1, Dallas was released by the Panthers. He re-signed to the Panthers practice squad on November 4.

=== Jacksonville Jaguars ===
On December 16, 2025, Dallas was signed by the Jacksonville Jaguars off of the Panthers practice squad. He made three appearances for Jacksonville, recording two rush attempts for 21 yards.

On February 16, 2026, Dallas re-signed with the Jaguars. He was released by Jacksonville on August 30 during final roster cuts.

=== Minnesota Vikings ===
On September 2, 2026, Dallas signed to the Minnesota Vikings' practice squad. He was signed to the active roster on September 16, following an injury to Jordan Mason. He was released on October 23, and re-signed to the practice squad the next day; and he also was activated from the week 7 game against the Indianapolis Colts. On November 4, he was re-signed to the Vikings active roster.

== Personal life ==
On June 30, 2019, Dallas and fiancée Yasmin Dugans became parents to a son. Dugans is the daughter of former Miami and current Florida A&M wide receivers coach Ron Dugans.
