= 2017 Rutgers Scarlet Knights football team =

American college football season

2017 Rutgers Scarlet Knights football
- Conference: Big Ten Conference
- East Division
- Record: 4–8 (3–6 Big Ten)
- Head coach: Chris Ash (2nd season)
- Offensive coordinator: Jerry Kill (1st season)
- Offensive scheme: Power spread
- Defensive coordinator: Jay Niemann (2nd season)
- Co-defensive coordinator: Bill Busch (1st season)
- Base defense: Multiple
- Home stadium: High Point Solutions Stadium

2017 Big Ten Conference football standings
	Conf.			Overall
Team	W		L	W		L
East Division
No. 5 Ohio State xy$	8	–	1	12	–	2
No. 15 Michigan State	7	–	2	10	–	3
No. 8 Penn State	7	–	2	11	–	2
Michigan	5	–	4	8	–	5
Rutgers	3	–	6	4	–	8
Indiana	2	–	7	5	–	7
Maryland	2	–	7	4	–	8
West Division
No. 7 Wisconsin xy	9	–	0	13	–	1
No. 17 Northwestern	7	–	2	10	–	3
Iowa	4	–	5	8	–	5
Purdue	4	–	5	7	–	6
Nebraska	3	–	6	4	–	8
Minnesota	2	–	7	5	–	7
Illinois	0	–	9	2	–	10
Championship: Ohio State 27, Wisconsin 21
$ – Conference champion; x – Division champion/co-champions; y – Championship game participant; Rankings from AP Poll

The 2017 Rutgers Scarlet Knights football team represented Rutgers University during the 2017 NCAA Division I FBS football season. The Scarlet Knights played their home games at High Point Solutions Stadium in Piscataway, New Jersey and competed as members of the East Division of the Big Ten Conference. They were led by second-year head coach Chris Ash. They finished the season 4–8, 3–6 in Big Ten play to finish in fifth place in the East Division.

== Recruiting ==
=== Recruits ===
The Scarlet Knights signed a total of 26 recruits.

College recruiting information (2017)
Name	Hometown	School	Height	Weight	Commit date
Naijee Jones; CB	Sicklerville, New Jersey	Timber Creek HS	6 ft 1 in (1.85 m)	185 lb (84 kg)	Nov 23, 2015
Naijee Jones; CB	Recruit ratings: Scout: Rivals: 247Sports: ESPN:				
Bo Melton; WR	Egg Harbor City, New Jersey	Cedar Creek HS	6 ft 0 in (1.83 m)	185 lb (84 kg)	Apr 15, 2016
Bo Melton; WR	Recruit ratings: Scout: Rivals: 247Sports: ESPN:				
Micah Clark; OT	Holmdel, New Jersey	St. John Vianney HS	6 ft 5 in (1.96 m)	265 lb (120 kg)	Apr 19, 2016
Micah Clark; OT	Recruit ratings: Scout: Rivals: 247Sports: ESPN:				
Jamaal Beaty; OG	Holmdel, New Jersey	St. John Vianney HS	6 ft 1 in (1.85 m)	185 lb (84 kg)	Apr 19, 2016
Jamaal Beaty; OG	Recruit ratings: Scout: Rivals: 247Sports: ESPN:				
Everett Wormley; WR	Burlington Township, New Jersey	Burlington Township HS	6 ft 1 in (1.85 m)	175 lb (79 kg)	Apr 22, 2016
Everett Wormley; WR	Recruit ratings: Scout: Rivals: 247Sports: ESPN:				
Jonathan Lewis; QB	Jersey City, New Jersey	St. Peter's Prep	6 ft 3 in (1.91 m)	210 lb (95 kg)	Apr 30, 2016
Jonathan Lewis; QB	Recruit ratings: Scout: Rivals: 247Sports: ESPN:				
Tim Barrow; CB	Staten Island, New York	Tottenville HS	5 ft 11 in (1.80 m)	188 lb (85 kg)	May 5, 2016
Tim Barrow; CB	Recruit ratings: Scout: Rivals: 247Sports: ESPN:				
Samuel Vrteman; OT	Cheshire, Connecticut	Cheshire Academy	6 ft 6 in (1.98 m)	295 lb (134 kg)	May 16, 2016
Samuel Vrteman; OT	Recruit ratings: Scout: Rivals: 247Sports: ESPN:				
Edwin Lopez; S	Camden, New Jersey	Woodrow Wilson HS	6 ft 1 in (1.85 m)	185 lb (84 kg)	Jun 1, 2016
Edwin Lopez; S	Recruit ratings: Scout: Rivals: 247Sports: ESPN:				
Owen Bowles; OG	Egg Harbor City, New Jersey	Cedar Creek HS	6 ft 4 in (1.93 m)	285 lb (129 kg)	Jun 12, 2016
Owen Bowles; OG	Recruit ratings: Scout: Rivals: 247Sports: ESPN:				
C.J. Onyechi; LB	West Orange, New Jersey	West Orange HS	6 ft 2 in (1.88 m)	220 lb (100 kg)	Jun 16, 2016
C.J. Onyechi; LB	Recruit ratings: Scout: Rivals: 247Sports: ESPN:				
Tyler Hayek; S	Wayne, New Jersey	Wayne Hills HS	6 ft 4 in (1.93 m)	185 lb (84 kg)	Jun 25, 2016
Tyler Hayek; S	Recruit ratings: Scout: Rivals: 247Sports: ESPN:				
Tyshon Fogg; LB	Towson, Maryland	Calvert Hall HS	6 ft 2 in (1.88 m)	216 lb (98 kg)	Jun 26, 2016
Tyshon Fogg; LB	Recruit ratings: Scout: Rivals: 247Sports: ESPN:				
Olakunle Fatukasi; LB	Brooklyn, New York	Grand Street HS	6 ft 2 in (1.88 m)	210 lb (95 kg)	Jun 28, 2016
Olakunle Fatukasi; LB	Recruit ratings: Scout: Rivals: 247Sports: ESPN:				
Shameen Jones; WR	The Bronx, New York	Cardinal Hayes HS	6 ft 2 in (1.88 m)	171 lb (78 kg)	Jun 28, 2016
Shameen Jones; WR	Recruit ratings: Scout: Rivals: 247Sports: ESPN:				
Jaohne Duggan; DE	Bethlehem, Pennsylvania	Liberty HS	6 ft 2 in (1.88 m)	275 lb (125 kg)	Jun 28, 2016
Jaohne Duggan; DE	Recruit ratings: Scout: Rivals: 247Sports: ESPN:				
Mike Tverdov; DE	Union, New Jersey	Union HS	6 ft 3 in (1.91 m)	235 lb (107 kg)	Jul 13, 2016
Mike Tverdov; DE	Recruit ratings: Scout: Rivals: 247Sports: ESPN:				
Brendan Bordner; DE	Hilliard, Ohio	Hilliard Bradley HS	6 ft 5 in (1.96 m)	240 lb (110 kg)	Dec 14, 2016
Brendan Bordner; DE	Recruit ratings: Scout: Rivals: 247Sports: ESPN:				
Brendan Devera; LB	Wayne, New Jersey	Wayne Hills HS	6 ft 2 in (1.88 m)	231 lb (105 kg)	Jan 23, 2017
Brendan Devera; LB	Recruit ratings: Scout: Rivals: 247Sports: ESPN:				
Tijaun Mason; DE	Memphis, Tennessee	Trezevant HS	6 ft 6 in (1.98 m)	220 lb (100 kg)	Jan 24, 2017
Tijaun Mason; DE	Recruit ratings: Scout: Rivals: 247Sports: ESPN:				
Travis Vokolek; TE	Springfield, Missouri	Kickapoo HS	6 ft 6 in (1.98 m)	215 lb (98 kg)	Jan 28, 2017
Travis Vokolek; TE	Recruit ratings: Scout: Rivals: 247Sports: ESPN:				
Hunter Hayek; WR	Wayne, New Jersey	Wayne Hills HS	5 ft 11 in (1.80 m)	175 lb (79 kg)	Jan 29, 2017
Hunter Hayek; WR	Recruit ratings: Scout: Rivals: 247Sports: ESPN:				
Syhiem Simmons; S	Montgomery, Alabama	Carver HS	6 ft 1 in (1.85 m)	200 lb (91 kg)	Jan 29, 2017
Syhiem Simmons; S	Recruit ratings: Scout: Rivals: 247Sports: ESPN:				
Elijah Barnwell; RB	Piscataway, New Jersey	Piscataway Township HS	5 ft 10 in (1.78 m)	200 lb (91 kg)	Jan 31, 2017
Elijah Barnwell; RB	Recruit ratings: Scout: Rivals: 247Sports: ESPN:				
Eddie Lewis; WR	Middletown, New Jersey	Mater Dei HS	6 ft 0 in (1.83 m)	179 lb (81 kg)	Feb 1, 2017
Eddie Lewis; WR	Recruit ratings: Scout: Rivals: 247Sports: ESPN:				
Raheem Blackshear; WR	Warminister, Pennsylvania	Archbishop Wood HS	5 ft 9 in (1.75 m)	170 lb (77 kg)	Feb 1, 2017
Raheem Blackshear; WR	Recruit ratings: Scout: Rivals: 247Sports: ESPN:				
Overall recruit ranking:
Note: In many cases, Scout, Rivals, 247Sports, On3, and ESPN may conflict in their listings of height and weight.; In these cases, the average was taken. ESPN grades are on a 100-point scale.; Sources: "Rutgers Football Commitments". Rivals.; "2017 Rutgers Football Commits". Scout.; "ESPN". ESPN.; "Scout.com Team Recruiting Rankings". Scout.; "2017 Team Ranking". Rivals.com.

== Schedule ==
Rutgers announced its 2017 football schedule on July 11, 2013. The 2017 schedule consisted of 6 home, 5 away, and 1 neutral site game in the regular season. The Scarlet Knights hosted Big Ten foes Michigan State, Ohio State, and Purdue, and traveled to Illinois, Indiana, Michigan, Nebraska, and Penn State. Rutgers played against Maryland in Bronx, New York at Yankee Stadium.

The Scarlet Knights hosted all three of the non-conference opponents, Eastern Michigan from the Mid-American Conference, Morgan State from the Mid-Eastern Athletic Conference and Washington from the Pac-12 Conference.

Date	Time	Opponent	Site	TV	Result	Attendance
September 1	8:00 p.m.	No. 8 Washington*	High Point Solutions Stadium; Piscataway, NJ	FS1	L 14–30	46,093
September 9	3:30 p.m.	Eastern Michigan*	High Point Solutions Stadium; Piscataway, NJ	BTN	L 13–16	37,661
September 16	3:30 p.m	Morgan State*	High Point Solutions Stadium; Piscataway, NJ	BTN	W 65–0	39,892
September 23	3:30 p.m.	at Nebraska	Memorial Stadium; Lincoln, NE	BTN	L 17–27	89,775
September 30	7:30 p.m.	No. 11 Ohio State	High Point Solutions Stadium; Piscataway, NJ	BTN	L 0–56	46,328
October 14	12:00 p.m.	at Illinois	Memorial Stadium; Champaign, IL	BTN	W 35–24	35,675
October 21	12:00 p.m.	Purdue^{†}	High Point Solutions Stadium; Piscataway, NJ	BTN	W 14–12	38,278
October 28	12:00 p.m.	at Michigan	Michigan Stadium; Ann Arbor, MI	BTN	L 14–35	111,213
November 4	3:30 p.m.	Maryland	High Point Solutions Stadium; Piscataway, NJ	BTN	W 31–24	35,221
November 11	12:00 p.m.	at No. 16 Penn State	Beaver Stadium; University Park, PA	BTN	L 6–35	107,531
November 18	12:00 p.m.	at Indiana	Memorial Stadium; Bloomington, IN	BTN	L 0–41	35,949
November 25	4:00 p.m.	No. 21 Michigan State	High Point Solutions Stadium; Piscataway, NJ	FOX	L 7–40	35,021
*Non-conference game; ^{†}Homecoming; Rankings from AP Poll released prior to game; All times are in Eastern time

Schedule source:

== Game summaries ==
=== Washington ===
	1	2	3	4	Total
#8 Huskies	3	7	10	10	30
Scarlet Knights	7	0	0	7	14

The Scarlet Knights opened the season by welcoming No. 8-ranked Washington to New Jersey. Rutgers took the early lead on a three-yard touchdown pass from Kyle Bolin to Janarion Grant. Washington answered with a field goal in the first quarter and a 61-yard punt return for a touchdown with the 3:50 seconds left in the half to take a 10–7 halftime lead. Though trailing, the Knights played well and hung with the highly ranked Huskies in the first half. However, Washington QB Jake Browning threw two second-half touchdown passes as Washington pulled away from the Scarlet Knights to win the game 30–14. The loss left the Scarlet Knights with an 0–1 record.

=== Eastern Michigan ===
	1	2	3	4	Total
Eagles	0	13	0	3	16
Scarlet Knights	6	7	0	0	13

=== Morgan State ===
	1	2	3	4	Total
Bears	0	0	0	0	0
Scarlet Knights	7	27	17	14	65

=== At Nebraska ===
	1	2	3	4	Total
Scarlet Knights	7	3	7	0	17
Cornhuskers	7	7	7	6	27

=== Ohio State ===
	1	2	3	4	Total
Buckeyes	7	28	7	14	56
Scarlet Knights	0	0	0	0	0

=== At Illinois ===
	1	2	3	4	Total
Scarlet Knights	7	14	7	7	35
Fighting Illini	3	7	0	14	24

=== Purdue ===
	1	2	3	4	Total
Boilermakers	0	3	3	6	12
Scarlet Knights	7	0	7	0	14

=== At Michigan ===
	1	2	3	4	Total
Scarlet Knights	0	7	7	0	14
Wolverines	0	21	7	7	35

=== Maryland ===
	1	2	3	4	Total
Terrapins	7	7	10	0	24
Scarlet Knights	0	17	0	14	31

=== At Penn State ===
	1	2	3	4	Total
Scarlet Knights	3	3	0	0	6
Nittany Lions	0	14	14	7	35

=== At Indiana ===
	1	2	3	4	Total
Scarlet Knights	0	0	0	0	0
Hoosiers	17	3	14	7	41

=== Michigan State ===
	1	2	3	4	Total
Spartans	13	3	3	21	40
Scarlet Knights	0	7	0	0	7

== Roster ==
2017 Rutgers Scarlet Knights football team roster
Players
Coaches
Offense

Pos.	#	Name	Class
WR	1	Janarion Grant	Sr
WR	2	Ahmir Mitchell	Fr
WR	3	Jawuan Harris	So
RB	4	Trey Sneed	So
WR	5	Damon Mitchell	Sr
WR	6	Mohamed Jabbie	Fr
RB	7	Robert Martin	Sr
RB	8	Josh Hicks	Sr
QB	9	Kyle Bolin	Sr
WR	10	Everett Wormley	Fr
QB	11	Johnathan Lewis	Fr
QB	12	Zach Allen	Sr
TE	12	Myles Nash	Sr
RB	13	Gus Edwards	Sr
QB	14	Rob Nittolo	Jr
WR	15	Shameen Jones	Fr
WR	16	Tommy Wyatt	Fr
QB	17	Giovanni Rescigno	Jr
WR	18	Bo Melton	Fr
QB	19	Tom Flacco	Jr
RB	20	Elijah Barnwell	Fr
WR	23	Dacoven Bailey	Fr
RB	24	Charles Snorweah	So
RB	25	Raheem Blackshear	Fr
RB	27	McDerby Ceneus	Jr
RB	28	Aslan Pugh	Fr
RB	38	Jim Brady	Fr
WR	38	Nyshere Woodson	Fr
RB	40	Brendan Devera	Fr
RB	44	Max Anthony	So
OL	50	Owen Bowles	Fr
OL	51	Jamaal Beaty	Fr
OL	54	Kamaal Seymour	So
OL	55	Michael Maietti	Fr
OL	56	Micah Clark	Fr
OL	57	Zach Miseo	Fr
OL	58	Charles Zarzecki	Fr
OL	60	Dorian Miller	Sr
OL	61	Mike Lonsdorf	Fr
OL	63	Jim Onulak	Fr
OL	64	Skiy Pyrame	So
OL	65	Tariq Cole	Jr
OL	66	Nick Krimin	Fr
OL	71	Marcus Applefield	Jr
OL	72	Manny Taylor	So
OL	73	Jonah Jackson	So
OL	74	Sam Howson	Fr
OL	75	Zach Venesky	So
OL	77	Sam Vretman	Fr
OL	79	Zack Heeman	Jr
WR	80	Nixon Provillon	Sr
WR	81	Tyler Hayek	Fr
WR	82	Hunter Hayek	Fr
WR	83	Rashad Blunt	So
WR	84	Cole Murphy	Jr
TE	86	Nakia Griffin-Stewart	So
WR	87	Prince Taylor	Fr
TE	88	Jerome Washington	Jr
TE	89	Travis Vokolek	Fr

Defense

Pos.	#	Name	Class
DB	2	Kiy Hester	Jr
LB	3	Olakunle Fatukasi	Fr
DB	4	Tre Avery	Fr
LB	6	Deonte Roberts	Jr
DL	7	Elorm Lumor	Fr
LB	8	Tyshon Fogg	Fr
DB	9	Saquan Hampton	Jr
DB	10	Blessuan Austin	Jr
DB	11	Isaiah Wharton	Jr
DL	14	Solomon Manning	Fr
LB	15	Trevor Morris	Jr
DB	16	Jelani Garvin	So
DB	17	K. J. Gray	So
LB	21	Ross Douglas	Sr
DB	22	Damon Hayes	So
DB	24	Naijee Jones	Fr
LB	25	Syhiem Simmons	Fr
LB	26	C. J. Onyechi	Fr
DB	27	Kobe Marfo	Jr
DB	29	Lawrence Stevens	Fr
DB	31	Edwin Lopez	Fr
DB	32	Rani Abdulaziz	Fr
DB	33	Tim Barrow	Fr
DB	34	Parker Day	Fr
LB	35	Eric Margolis	Jr
LB	36	T. J. Taylor	Sr
DB	37	Zane Campbell	Sr
LB	44	Tyreek Maddox-Williams	So
DB	46	Davante McDuffie	Sr
LB	49	Brandon Russell	Jr
DL	50	Julius Turner	Fr
DL	51	Sebastian Joseph-Day	Sr
DL	53	Brendan Bordner	Fr
LB	55	Austin Rosa	So
LB	56	Rashawn Battle	Fr
DL	57	Joahne Duggan	Fr
DL	58	Kemoko Turay	Sr
DL	59	Darnell Davis	Sr
DL	91	Tijuan Mason	Fr
DL	92	Eric Wiafe	Jr
DL	93	Jason Griggs	Fr
DL	95	Jon Bateky	Jr
DL	96	Willington Previlon	So
DL	97	Mike Tverdov	Fr
DL	98	Jimmy Hogan	Jr
DL	99	Kevin Wilkins	Jr

Special teams

Pos.	#	Name	Class
LS	47	Bill Taylor	Fr
LS	62	Matthew Sportelli	Fr
LS	85	Alan Lucy	Sr
P	94	Michael Cintron	Jr
K	95	Justin Davidovicz	Fr
P	96	Ryan Anderson	Sr
PK	97	Andrew Harte	Sr
PK	98	David Bonagura	Sr
P	99	Gavin Haggerty	So

Head coach

- Chris Ash

Coordinators/assistant coaches

- Jerry Kill (offensive coordinator/quarterbacks)
- Jay Nieman (defensive coordinator/linebackers)
- Vince Okruch (special teams coordinator/tight ends)
- A. J. Blazek (assistant head coach/offensive line)
- Shane Burnham (defensive line)
- Bill Busch (co-defensive coordinator/defensive backs)
- Henry Baker (cornerbacks)
- Lester Erb (running backs)
- Jafar Williams (wide receivers)
- Kenny Parker (head strength and conditioning)
- Mason Judd (defensive assistant)
- David Galante (offensive assistant)
- Mark Rosenbaum (offensive assistant)
- Anthony Van Curen (defensive assistant)

Legend

- (C) Team captain
- (S) Suspended
- (I) Ineligible
- Injured
- Redshirt

Roster
Last update: August 17, 2017

== Players in the 2018 NFL draft ==
Player	Position	Round	Pick	NFL club
Kemoko Turay	DE	2	52	Indianapolis Colts
Sebastian Joseph-Day	DT	6	195	Los Angeles Rams
