= Tyler Beach =

American football player (born 1999)

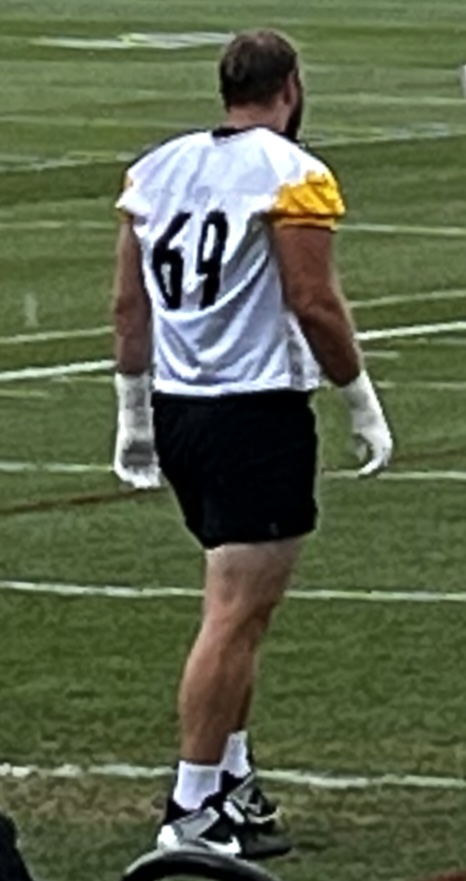
- Beach with the Steelers in 2024

Profile
- Position: Guard

Personal information
- Born: June 14, 1999 (age 27); Grafton, Wisconsin, U.S.
- Listed height: 6 ft 6 in (1.98 m)
- Listed weight: 290 lb (132 kg)

Career information
- High school: Port Washington (Port Washington, Wisconsin)
- College: Wisconsin (2017–2022)
- NFL draft: 2023: undrafted

Career history
- Houston Texans (2023)*; Pittsburgh Steelers (2024)*
- * Offseason or practice squad member only

Awards and highlights
- Third-team All-Big Ten (2021)
- Stats at Pro Football Reference

Tyler Beach (born June 14, 1999) is an American professional football guard. He played college football for the Wisconsin Badgers. He went undrafted in the 2023 NFL draft and signed as an undrafted free agent with the Houston Texans in 2023.

== Early life ==
He was born in Grafton, Wisconsin. Beach is the son of Bruce and Kathy Beach. He attended Port Washington High School in Port Washington, Wisconsin. During his senior year in 2017, Beach was ranked the 45th best offensive tackle recruit in the United States, making him the highest ranked offensive recruit from Wisconsin for the year.

== College career ==
On April 16, 2016, Beach committed to Wisconsin and enrolled on June 20, 2017. In his first season, he played in 12 games and made his first bowl appearance in the 2017 Orange Bowl. He would appear in another one the next season against Miami in the 2018 Pinstripe Bowl. In 2021, he would record one tackle on offense. In 2022, as a fifth year senior, Beach only allowed three QB hurries and one sack during his 11 games played. In total, Beach played 57 games, recording 29 starts, primarily at the left tackle and left guard position. He graduated with a bachelor's degree in International Studies while preparing for the 2023 NFL draft.

== Professional career ==
Pre-draft measurables
| Height | Weight | Arm length | Hand span | 40-yard dash | 10-yard split | 20-yard split | 20-yard shuttle | Three-cone drill | Vertical jump | Broad jump | Bench press |
|---|---|---|---|---|---|---|---|---|---|---|---|
| 6 ft 5 3/5 in (1.97 m) | 304 lb (138 kg) | 32 1/2 in (0.83 m) | 9 1/2 in (0.24 m) | 5.32 s | 1.85 s | 2.96 s | 4.76 s | 7.82 s | 31.0 in (0.79 m) | 8 ft 5 in (2.57 m) | 21 reps |
All values from Pro Day

=== Houston Texans ===
Beach signed a three-year, $2.7 million contract as an undrafted free agent with the Houston Texans on April 29, 2023. He did not play a down for the entire season and was released following the Texans AFC Divisional playoff loss to the Baltimore Ravens.

=== Pittsburgh Steelers ===
In 2024, Beach signed a $795,000 contract with the Pittsburgh Steelers. He was named the third string right guard on August 6, 2024, behind James Daniels and Mason McCormick. On August 27, Beach was released by the Steelers.
