= 2017 Maryland Terrapins football team =

American college football season

2017 Maryland Terrapins football
- Conference: Big Ten Conference
- East Division
- Record: 4–8 (2–7 Big Ten)
- Head coach: D. J. Durkin (2nd season)
- Offensive coordinator: Walt Bell (2nd season)
- Offensive scheme: Spread
- Defensive coordinator: Andy Buh (2nd season)
- Base defense: 4–2–5
- Home stadium: Byrd Stadium

2017 Big Ten Conference football standings
| | Conf. | | | Overall |
| Team | W | | L | W | | L |
|---|---|---|---|---|---|---|
East Division
| No. 5 Ohio State xy$ | 8 | – | 1 | 12 | – | 2 |
| No. 15 Michigan State | 7 | – | 2 | 10 | – | 3 |
| No. 8 Penn State | 7 | – | 2 | 11 | – | 2 |
| Michigan | 5 | – | 4 | 8 | – | 5 |
| Rutgers | 3 | – | 6 | 4 | – | 8 |
| Indiana | 2 | – | 7 | 5 | – | 7 |
| Maryland | 2 | – | 7 | 4 | – | 8 |
West Division
| No. 7 Wisconsin xy | 9 | – | 0 | 13 | – | 1 |
| No. 17 Northwestern | 7 | – | 2 | 10 | – | 3 |
| Iowa | 4 | – | 5 | 8 | – | 5 |
| Purdue | 4 | – | 5 | 7 | – | 6 |
| Nebraska | 3 | – | 6 | 4 | – | 8 |
| Minnesota | 2 | – | 7 | 5 | – | 7 |
| Illinois | 0 | – | 9 | 2 | – | 10 |
Championship: Ohio State 27, Wisconsin 21
$ – Conference champion; x – Division champion/co-champions; y – Championship game participant; Rankings from AP Poll

The 2017 Maryland Terrapins football team represented the University of Maryland during the 2017 NCAA Division I FBS football season. The Terrapins played their home games at Maryland Stadium in College Park, Maryland and competed in the East Division of the Big Ten Conference. Maryland celebrated their 125th anniversary of the program that was established in 1892, when the University of Maryland, College Park was still known as the Maryland Agricultural College. They were led by second-year head coach D. J. Durkin. They finished the season 4–8, 2–7 in Big Ten play to finish in a tie for sixth place in the East Division.

== Schedule ==
Maryland announced its 2017 football schedule on July 11, 2013. The 2017 schedule consisted of 6 home, 5 away and 1 neutral site game in the regular season. The Terrapins hosted Big Ten foes Indiana, Michigan, Northwestern, and Penn State, and traveled to Michigan State, Minnesota, Ohio State, and Wisconsin. Maryland played Rutgers in Bronx, New York at Yankee Stadium.

The Terrapins hosted two of the three non-conference opponents, Towson from the Colonial Athletic Association, Central Florida (UCF) from the American Athletic Conference and traveled to Austin, Texas to face Texas from the Big 12 Conference.

| Date | Time | Opponent | Site | TV | Result | Attendance |
|---|---|---|---|---|---|---|
| September 2 | 12:00 p.m. | at No. 23 Texas* | Darrell K Royal–Texas Memorial Stadium; Austin, TX | FS1 | W 51–41 | 88,396 |
| September 9 | 12:00 p.m. | Towson* | Byrd Stadium; College Park, MD | BTN | W 63–17 | 37,105 |
| September 23 | 3:00 p.m. | UCF* | Maryland Stadium; College Park, MD | FS1 | L 10–38 | 33,280 |
| September 30 | 12:00 p.m. | at Minnesota | TCF Bank Stadium; Minneapolis, MN | FS1 | W 31–24 | 43,511 |
| October 7 | 4:00 p.m. | at No. 10 Ohio State | Ohio Stadium; Columbus, OH | FOX | L 14–62 | 107,180 |
| October 14 | 3:30 p.m. | Northwestern | Maryland Stadium; College Park, MD | ESPN2 | L 21–37 | 38,325 |
| October 21 | 12:00 p.m. | at No. 5 Wisconsin | Camp Randall Stadium; Madison, WI | FOX | L 13–38 | 78,058 |
| October 28 | 3:30 p.m. | Indiana^{†} | Maryland Stadium; College Park, MD | BTN | W 42–39 | 35,144 |
| November 4 | 3:30 p.m. | at Rutgers | High Point Solutions Stadium; Piscataway, NJ | BTN | L 24–31 | 35,221 |
| November 11 | 3:30 p.m. | No. 21 Michigan | Maryland Stadium; College Park, MD | BTN | L 10–35 | 44,325 |
| November 18 | 4:00 p.m. | at No. 22 Michigan State | Spartan Stadium; East Lansing, MI | FOX | L 7–17 | 70,216 |
| November 25 | 3:30 p.m. | No. 12 Penn State | Maryland Stadium; College Park, MD (rivalry) | BTN | L 3–66 | 49,680 |
*Non-conference game; ^{†}Homecoming; Rankings from AP Poll released prior to the game; All times are in Eastern time

== Game summaries ==
=== At Texas ===
| | 1 | 2 | 3 | 4 | Total |
|---|---|---|---|---|---|
| Terrapins | 14 | 16 | 7 | 14 | 51 |
| #23 Longhorns | 7 | 7 | 20 | 7 | 41 |

Maryland spoiled Texas coach Tom Herman's debut by upsetting the Longhorns, 51–41. The Terps got off to a rough start, with quarterback Tyrell Pigrome throwing an interception that was returned for a touchdown on the Terps' first offensive drive of the game. But after that, Maryland scored 27 unanswered points. Texas did come back and got to within three points, but were never able to regain the lead.

Maryland's Ty Johnson rushed for 132 yards on 12 carries, while D. J. Moore caught seven passes for 133 yards. Johnson, Pigrome, Kasim Hill, and Jake Funk all had rushing touchdowns, and Moore and Taivon Jacobs each had a receiving touchdown. The game also featured several non-offensive touchdowns. In addition to the pick-six by Texas, each team returned a blocked kick for a touchdown, and Texas also returned a punt for a touchdown.

While Pigrome had to leave due to an injury in the third quarter, true freshman quarterback Kasim Hill took over for Maryland and performed well, leading the Terps to two touchdowns in the fourth quarter. When it was all finished, Maryland had completed its first win over a ranked opponent since 2010.

During the game, Maryland lost two key players to injury. Starting quarterback Tyrrell Pigrome was lost for the season after tearing his ACL, and senior defensive end Jessie Aniebonam will miss "several months" due to a fractured ankle.

=== Towson ===
| | 1 | 2 | 3 | 4 | Total |
|---|---|---|---|---|---|
| Tigers | 0 | 7 | 0 | 10 | 17 |
| Terrapins | 21 | 7 | 21 | 14 | 63 |

Maryland's first home game of 2017 saw the Towson Tigers, Maryland's lone FCS opponent this season, visiting College Park. This game marked the first start of true freshman QB Kasim Hill, and he performed very well, completing 13 of 16 passes for 163 yards with no interceptions. Maryland jumped out to a quick 21-0 lead after the first quarter and ended up scoring nine touchdowns against Towson. It was the first time in Maryland history that the team has started a year by scoring at least 50 points in each of its first two games.

Ty Johnson rushed for 124 yards on only five carries, including two long runs for touchdowns (74 and 46 yards). Javon Leake, Jake Funk, Max Bortenschlager, and D. J. Moore also had rushing touchdowns. Moore led the receivers with 97 yards on seven catches, including two passes caught for touchdowns. Darnell Savage added a touchdown after he intercepted a pass thrown by Towson's Ryan Stover.

Maryland had big plays all afternoon. Six of Maryland's eight touchdowns by the offense were for at least 20 yards, including two that were over 60 yards. Maryland also had a 75-yard touchdown on an interception return. Moore and Johnson, who both had big games against Texas and also against Towson, combined for five of the nine touchdowns. Freshman tailback Javon Leake make his debut for the Terps and also got in on the big play action, scoring a touchdown after a 61-yard rush.

In the end, Maryland was far too much for Towson to handle, and the Terps ended up with a 63-17 victory.

=== UCF ===
| | 1 | 2 | 3 | 4 | Total |
|---|---|---|---|---|---|
| Knights | 0 | 14 | 7 | 17 | 38 |
| Terrapins | 3 | 0 | 7 | 0 | 10 |

Maryland's last non-conference game of the season saw Central Florida visiting College Park. The previous year, Maryland and UCF had met in Orlando, with Maryland winning in double-overtime.

Kasim Hill made his second start at QB for the Terps, but he would not stay in the game for long. In the first quarter during a QB scramble, Hill was injured, and was unable to put any weight on his right leg as he hobbled off the field with assistance. Sophomore QB Max Bortenschlager replaced Hill, but was unable to lead the Terps to victory. He finished 15 for 26 with 132 yards, one touchdown, and two interceptions.

UCF lead 14-3 after the first half. Maryland's offense ended up being outgained 428-197 and was not able to mount any serious threat against UCF. Maryland converted only 2 out of 13 third down attempts. The scoring was capped for the day when a Bortenschlager pass was picked off and returned for a TD by Mike Hughes. Central Florida ended up defeating Maryland by a final score of 38-10.

=== At Minnesota ===
| | 1 | 2 | 3 | 4 | Total |
|---|---|---|---|---|---|
| Terrapins | 7 | 10 | 0 | 14 | 31 |
| Golden Gophers | 0 | 10 | 7 | 7 | 24 |

=== At Ohio State ===
| | 1 | 2 | 3 | 4 | Total |
|---|---|---|---|---|---|
| Terrapins | 7 | 0 | 0 | 7 | 14 |
| No. 11 Buckeyes | 20 | 21 | 14 | 7 | 62 |

=== Northwestern ===
| | 1 | 2 | 3 | 4 | Total |
|---|---|---|---|---|---|
| Wildcats | 3 | 21 | 3 | 10 | 37 |
| Terrapins | 7 | 7 | 7 | 0 | 21 |

=== At Wisconsin ===
| | 1 | 2 | 3 | 4 | Total |
|---|---|---|---|---|---|
| Terrapins | 0 | 3 | 10 | 0 | 13 |
| No. 5 Badgers | 7 | 14 | 7 | 10 | 38 |

=== Indiana ===
| | 1 | 2 | 3 | 4 | Total |
|---|---|---|---|---|---|
| Hoosiers | 16 | 7 | 10 | 6 | 39 |
| Terrapins | 7 | 21 | 0 | 14 | 42 |

=== At Rutgers ===
| | 1 | 2 | 3 | 4 | Total |
|---|---|---|---|---|---|
| Terrapins | 7 | 7 | 10 | 0 | 24 |
| Scarlet Knights | 0 | 17 | 0 | 14 | 31 |

=== Michigan ===
| | 1 | 2 | 3 | 4 | Total |
|---|---|---|---|---|---|
| Wolverines | 7 | 21 | 0 | 7 | 35 |
| Terrapins | 0 | 0 | 3 | 7 | 10 |

=== At Michigan State ===
| | 1 | 2 | 3 | 4 | Total |
|---|---|---|---|---|---|
| Terrapins | 0 | 0 | 0 | 7 | 7 |
| Spartans | 7 | 7 | 3 | 0 | 17 |

=== Penn State ===
| | 1 | 2 | 3 | 4 | Total |
|---|---|---|---|---|---|
| No. 12 Nittany Lions | 14 | 17 | 21 | 14 | 66 |
| Terrapins | 0 | 0 | 3 | 0 | 3 |

== Roster ==
2017 Maryland Terrapins football team roster
Players
Coaches
Offense

| Pos. | # | Name | Class |
|---|---|---|---|
| WR | 1 | D. J. Moore | Jr |
| RB | 2 | Lorenzo Harrison III | So |
| QB | 3 | Tyrrell Pigrome (injured) | So |
| RB | 5 | Anthony McFarland Jr. | Fr |
| RB | 6 | Ty Johnson | Jr |
| QB | 8 | Caleb Henderson (injured) | Jr |
| WR | 9 | Jahrvis Davenport | Jr |
| WR | 10 | D. J. Turner | So |
| QB | 11 | Kasim Hill | Fr |
| WR | 12 | Tavion Jacobs | Sr |
| WR | 14 | Tahj Capehart | Fr |
| QB | 16 | Ryan Brand | So |
| QB | 18 | Max Bortenschlager | So |
| WR | 19 | M. J. Jarrell | Fr |
| RB | 20 | Javon Leake | Fr |
| RB | 33 | Tayon Fleet-Davis | Fr |
| RB | 34 | Jake Funk | So |
| RB | 35 | Marcus Smith | Sr |
| WR | 37 | Josh Bekoe | Sr |
| WR | 37 | Chris Jones | Sr |
| RB | 40 | Ikechukwu Ogwuegbu | So |
| TE | 47 | Kevin Woodeshick | Jr |
| TE | 48 | Derrick Hayward | Sr |
| OL | 55 | Derwin Gray | Jr |
| OL | 57 | Richard Merritt | Fr |
| OL | 58 | Damian Prince | Jr |
| OL | 64 | Brendan Moore | Jr |
| OL | 67 | Tyran Hunt | Fr |
| OL | 68 | Ellis McKennie | So |
| OL | 70 | Sean Christie | Jr |
| OL | 72 | Marcus Minor | Fr |
| OL | 73 | Johnny Jordan | Fr |
| OL | 74 | Brian Plummer | Fr |
| OL | 75 | Terrence Davis | So |
| OL | 77 | Will McClain | So |
| OL | 79 | Jordan McNair | Fr |
| TE | 80 | Noah Barnes | Fr |
| TE | 82 | Avery Edwards | Jr |
| WR | 83 | Carlos Carriere | Fr |
| WR | 84 | Jacquille Veii | Sr |
| WR | 85 | Sean Nelson | Fr |
| WR | 86 | Jayden Comma | Fr |
| WR | 87 | Michael Cornwell | Jr |
| TE | 89 | Andrew Park | Fr |

Defense

| Pos. | # | Name | Class |
|---|---|---|---|
| LB | 1 | Jermaine Carter | Sr |
| DB | 3 | Denzel Conyers | Sr |
| DB | 4 | Darnell Savage | Jr |
| DL | 5 | Cavon Walker | Jr |
| DL | 6 | Jesse Aniebonam (injured) | Sr |
| DB | 7 | J. C. Jackson | Jr |
| DL | 8 | Kingsley Opara | Sr |
| DB | 10 | Josh Woods | Sr |
| DB | 11 | Fofie Bazzie | Fr |
| DB | 12 | Elijah Daniels | So |
| DB | 13 | Markquese Bell | Fr |
| DB | 14 | Deon Jones | Fr |
| DB | 14 | J. T. Ventura | Sr |
| DE | 15 | Melvin Keihn | Jr |
| DB | 16 | Ayinde Eley | Fr |
| DB | 17 | Tino Ellis | So |
| LB | 18 | Shane Cockerille | Sr |
| DB | 20 | Antwaine Richardson (injured) | So |
| DB | 21 | RaVon Davis | Jr |
| ILB | 22 | Isaiah Davis | So |
| DB | 23 | Alex Woods | Jr |
| DB | 24 | Qwuantrezz Knight | So |
| LB | 25 | Antoine Brooks | So |
| DB | 26 | Kenny Bennett | Fr |
| DL | 27 | Bryce Bland | Fr |
| DB | 29 | Elisha Daniels | So |
| DB | 30 | Allen Corbin | Sr |
| LB | 31 | Nnamdi Egbuaba | Jr |
| LB | 39 | Steve Baca | So |
| LB | 42 | Nick Underwood | So |
| LB | 43 | Jalen Brooks | Sr |
| DL | 44 | Andrew Isaacs | Sr |
| DB | 45 | Dimitri Lee | Jr |
| DL | 50 | Mbi Tanyi | Jr |
| LB | 53 | Brett Shepherd | So |
| DE | 55 | Dion Goldbourne | Fr |
| LB | 56 | Matt Gillespie | Jr |
| DL | 56 | Cam Spence | Fr |
| DL | 57 | Sean Oluwatimi | So |
| DL | 59 | Keiron Howard | So |
| DL | 90 | B'Ahmad Miller | Fr |
| DL | 91 | Adam McLean | So |
| DL | 92 | Chandler Burkett | Sr |
| DL | 93 | Oseh Saine | So |
| DL | 95 | Lawtez Rogers | Fr |
| DL | 96 | Brett Kulka | Jr |
| DL | 97 | Celso Rivera | Jr |
| DL | 98 | Brandon Gaddy | Fr |
| DL | 99 | Breyon Gaddy | Fr |

Special teams

| Pos. | # | Name | Class |
|---|---|---|---|
| K | 3 | Adam Greene | Sr |
| K | 41 | Mike Shinsky | So |
| LS | 51 | Matt Oliveira | Jr |
| LS | 56 | Nate Adams | Sr |
| P | 88 | Wade Lees | So |
| K, P | 97 | Daniel Sutton | Sr |

Head coach

- D. J. Durkin

Coordinators/assistant coaches

- Andy Buh (defensive coordinator)
- Walt Bell (offensive coordinator / quarterbacks)
- Chris Beatty (Associate head coach / wide receivers)
- Jimmy Brumbaugh (Co-defensive Coordinator / Defensive Line)
- Pete Lembo (assistant head coach / special teams coordinator / tight ends)
- Tyler Bowen (offensive line)
- Aazaar Abdul-Rahim (defensive backs)
- Matt Barnes (linebackers)
- Anthony Tucker (running backs)
- Alex Garwig (graduate assistant)
- Micah James (graduate assistant)
- Fredi Knighten (graduate assistant)
- Desmond Morgan (graduate assistant)

Legend

- (C) Team captain
- (S) Suspended
- (I) Ineligible
- Injured
- Redshirt

Roster
Last update: September 14, 2017

== Awards and honors ==
Weekly Awards
| Player | Award | Date Awarded | Ref. |
|---|---|---|---|
| Antoine Brooks | Co-Special Teams Player of the Week | September 4, 2017 | |

== Players in the 2018 NFL draft ==
| Player | Position | Round | Pick | NFL club |
|---|---|---|---|---|
| D. J. Moore | WR | 1 | 24 | Carolina Panthers |
| Jermaine Carter | LB | 5 | 161 | Carolina Panthers |
