= Anthony Van Curen =

American football coach (born 1990)

Current position
- Title: Head coach
- Team: FDU–Florham
- Conference: MAC
- Record: 19–23

Biographical details
- Born: March 3, 1990 (age 36); Goshen, New York, U.S.
- Education: St. John Fisher University (2012); Fairleigh Dickinson University (2016)

Playing career
- 2008–2011: St. John Fisher
- Position: Linebacker

Coaching career (HC unless noted)
- 2012–2013: John S. Burke Catholic HS (NY) (assistant DC/assistant ST)
- 2014–2016: FDU–Florham (ST/DL)
- 2017–2018: Rutgers (GA)
- 2019–2021: FDU–Florham (DC)
- 2022–present: FDU–Florham

Head coaching record
- Overall: 19–23
- Bowls: 1–1

Anthony Van Curen (born March 3, 1990) is an American college football coach. He is the head football coach for Fairleigh Dickinson University, a position he has held since 2022. He also coached for John S. Burke Catholic High School and Rutgers. He played college football for St. John Fisher as a linebacker.

== Head coaching record ==
Year	Team	Overall	Conference	Standing	Bowl/playoffs
FDU–Florham Devils (Middle Atlantic Conference) (2022–present)
2022	FDU–Florham	6–5	4–4	6th	L James Lynah
2023	FDU–Florham	5–5	4–5	T–6th	
2024	FDU–Florham	7–4	5–4	T–3rd	W Centennial-MAC
2025	FDU–Florham	1–9	1–8	9th	
2026	FDU–Florham	0–0	0–0		
FDU–Florham:		19–23	14–21		
Total:		19–23			
