= 2017 Orange Bowl =

2017 Capital One Orange Bowl
- CFP New Year’s Six; 84th Orange Bowl
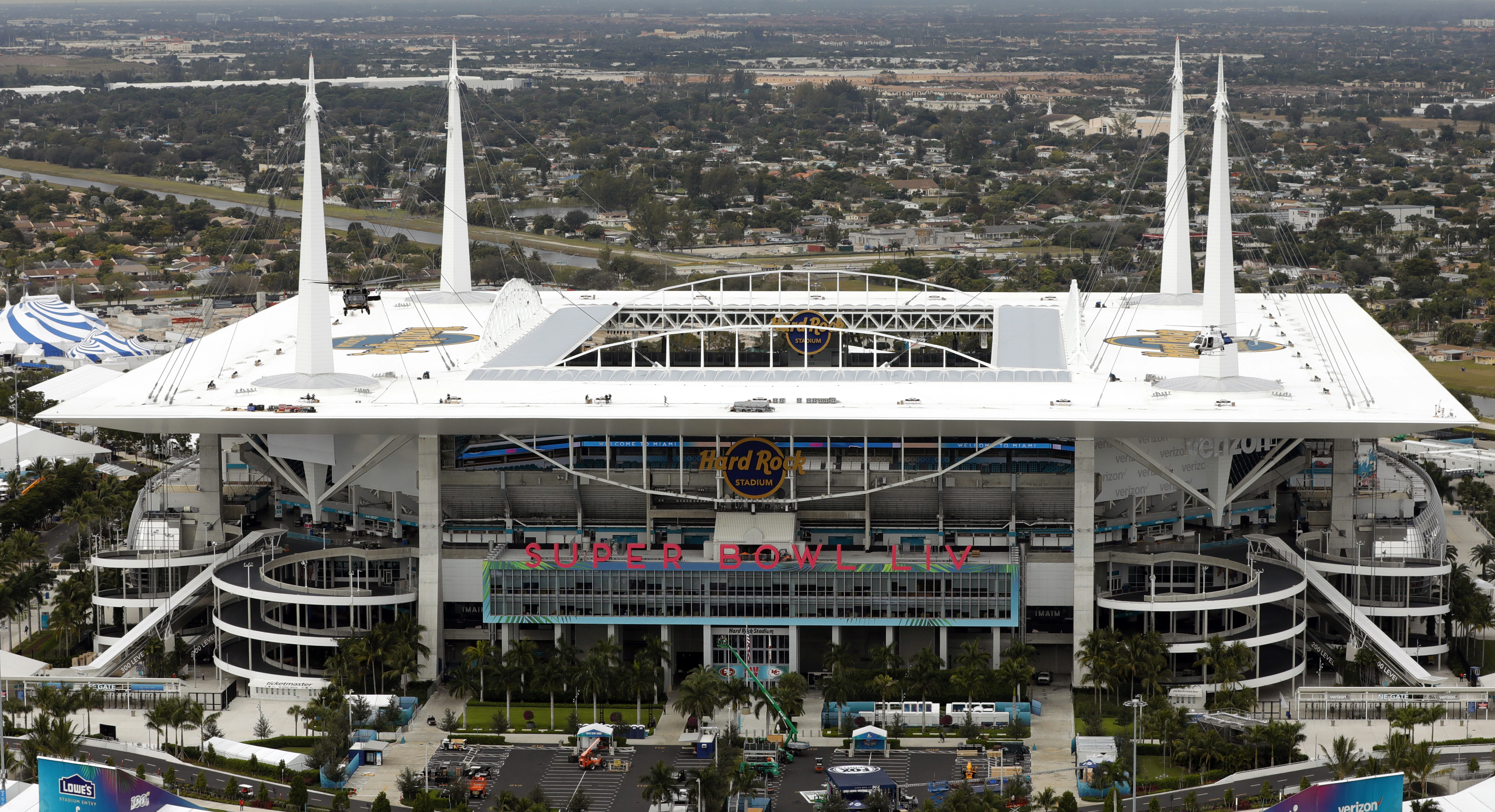
- Hard Rock Stadium in Miami Gardens, Florida, hosted the Orange Bowl.
Wisconsin Badgers	Miami Hurricanes
(12–1)	(10–2)
Big Ten	ACC
34	24
Head coach: Paul Chryst	Head coach: Mark Richt
AP / Coaches / CFP; 6 / 6 / 6	AP / Coaches / CFP; 11 / 11 / 10
	1	2	3	4	Total
Wisconsin	3	21	3	7	34
Miami	14	0	7	3	24
- Date: December 30, 2017
- Season: 2017
- Stadium: Hard Rock Stadium
- Location: Miami Gardens, Florida
- MVP: Alex Hornibrook (QB, Wisconsin)
- Favorite: Wisconsin by 6.5 (46)
- Referee: Matt Loeffler (SEC)
- Halftime show: Andy Grammer
- Attendance: 65,326

United States TV coverage
- Network: ESPN & ESPN Radio
- Announcers: Steve Levy, Brian Griese, Todd McShay, and Molly McGrath (ESPN) Dave Flemming, Anthony Becht and Rocky Boiman (ESPN Radio)

The 2017 Orange Bowl was a college football bowl game played on December 30, 2017 at the Hard Rock Stadium in Miami Gardens, Florida. The contest was televised on ESPN with a radio broadcast on ESPN Radio, kickoff was at 8:00 p.m. (EST). It was one of the 2017–18 bowl games that concluded the 2017 FBS football season. The 84th Orange Bowl, the game was sponsored by the Capital One financial services organization, and was officially known as the Capital One Orange Bowl.

The 2017 Orange Bowl featured the Wisconsin Badgers (12–1), champions of the Big Ten Conference West Division, and the Miami Hurricanes (10–2), champions of the Atlantic Coast Conference Coastal Division. Wisconsin beat Miami by a score of 34–24.

== Teams ==
The teams playing in the Orange Bowl game were the Miami Hurricanes and the Wisconsin Badgers. Prior to kickoff, the all-time series between the two teams was tied at 2 games apiece; the most recent meeting being at the 2009 Champs Sports Bowl, where the Badgers defeated the Hurricanes by a score of 20–14.

== Related events ==
- Selection Sunday, December 3, 2017
- Orange Bowl Fan Fest, December 30, 2017

== Game summary ==
=== Scoring summary ===
Scoring summary

Quarter	Time	Drive			Team	Scoring information	Score	
Quarter	Time	Plays	Yards	TOP	Team	Scoring information	WIS	MIA
1	7:58	8	47	3:18	WISC	35-yard field goal by Rafael Gaglianone	3	0
1	5:21	7	75	2:37	MIA	Travis Homer 5-yard touchdown run, Michael Badgley kick good	3	7
1	2:49	2	45	0:29	MIA	DeeJay Dallas 39-yard touchdown run, Michael Badgley kick good	3	14
2	13:37	3	23	1:19	WISC	Danny Davis III 20-yard touchdown reception from Alex Hornibrook, Rafael Gaglianone kick good	10	14
2	5:49	12	71	6:38	WISC	A.J. Taylor 16-yard touchdown reception from Alex Hornibrook, Rafael Gaglianone kick good	17	14
2	0:28	9	62	3:31	WISC	Danny Davis III 5-yard touchdown reception from Alex Hornibrook, Rafael Gaglianone kick good	24	14
3	10:52	2	46	0:26	MIA	Lawrence Cager 38-yard touchdown reception from Malik Rosier, Michael Badgley kick good	24	21
3	3:39	10	51	5:09	WISC	47-yard field goal by Rafael Gaglianone	27	21
4	11:34	10	47	3:11	MIA	41-yard field goal by Michael Badgley	27	24
4	7:44	8	75	3:50	WISC	Danny Davis III 6-yard touchdown reception from Alex Hornibrook, Rafael Gaglianone kick good	34	24
"TOP" = time of possession. For other American football terms, see Glossary of American football.							34	24

=== Statistics ===
	1	2	3	4	Total
No. 6 Badgers	3	21	3	7	34
No. 10 Hurricanes	14	0	7	3	24

Statistics	MIA	WIS
First downs	17	24
Plays–yards	55-377	78-400
Rushes–yards	29-174	44-142
Passing yards	203	258
Passing: Comp–Att–Int	11-26-3	23-34-0
Time of possession	20:08	39:52

Team	Category	Player	Statistics
MIA	Passing	Malik Rosier	11/26 203 yds 7.8 avg 1 TD 3 INT
MIA	Rushing	DeeJay Dallas	8 carries 69 yds 8.6 avg 1 TD
MIA	Receiving	Lawrence Cager	4 receptions 76 yds 19.0 avg 1 TD
WIS	Passing	Alex Hornibrook	23/34 258 yds 4 TDs 7.6 avg
WIS	Rushing	Jonathan Taylor	26 carries 130 yds 5.0 avg
WIS	Receiving	[A.J. Taylor]	8 receptions 105 yds 13.1 avg 1 TD
