= Alex Hornibrook =

American football player (born 1997)

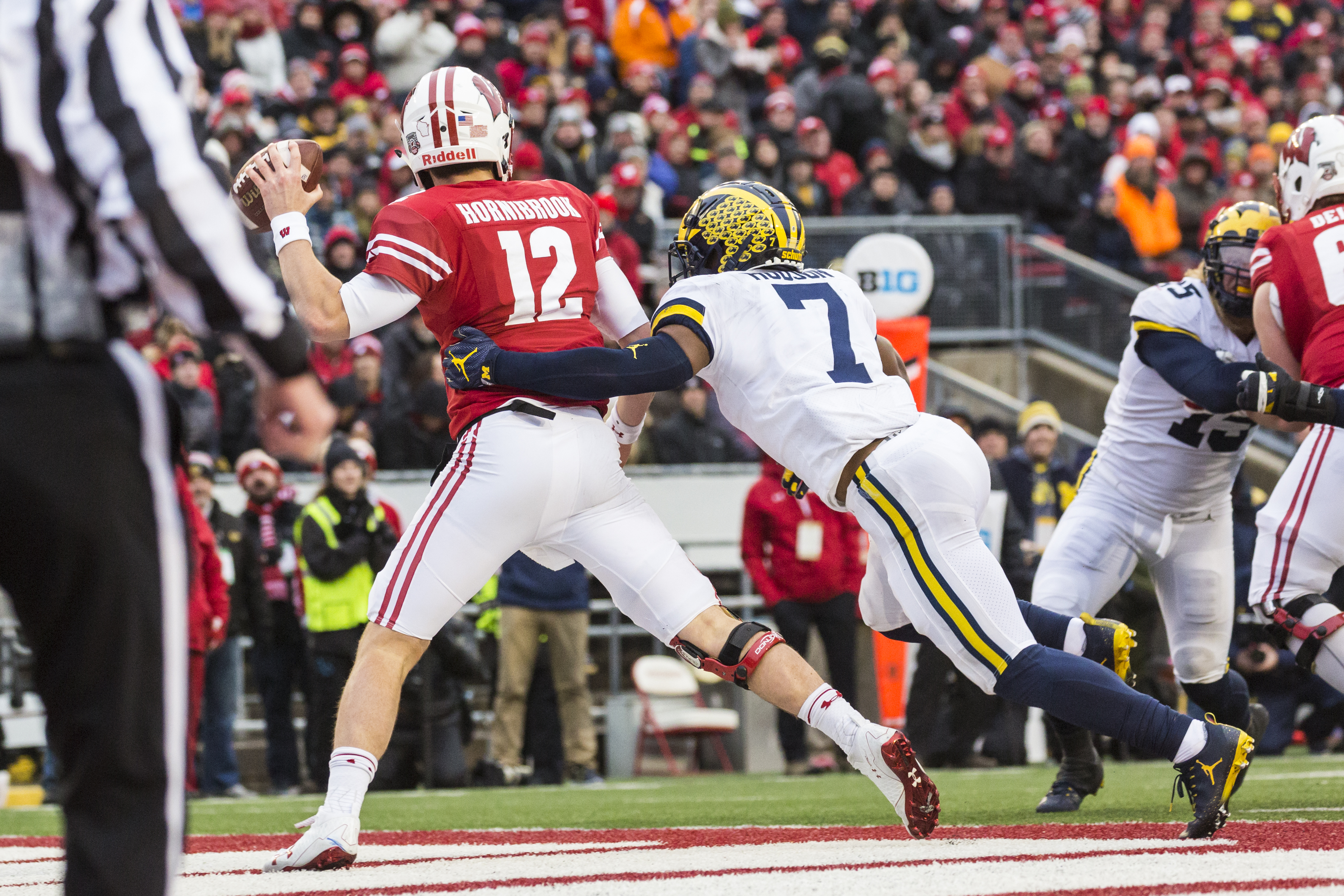
- Hornibrook throwing the ball against the Michigan Wolverines

Profile
- Position: Quarterback

Personal information
- Born: January 19, 1997 (age 29); West Chester, Pennsylvania, U.S.
- Listed height: 6 ft 4 in (1.93 m)
- Listed weight: 215 lb (98 kg)

Career information
- High school: Malvern Preparatory School (Malvern, Pennsylvania)
- College: Wisconsin (2015–2018); Florida State (2019)
- NFL draft: 2020: undrafted

Career history
- Jousters (2020)

Alex Hornibrook (born January 19, 1997) is an American former college football quarterback. The West Chester, Pennsylvania, native attended Malvern Preparatory School and originally committed to the University of Pittsburgh before attending Wisconsin. On March 10, 2019, Hornibrook announced his decision to transfer to Florida State University for his final season of eligibility as an NCAA graduate transfer. After college he played one season for the Jousters of The Spring League.

== Early life ==
As a junior at Malvern Preparatory School, Hornibrook would study extra film and conduct offensive meetings without the help of a coach. As a senior, there was a coaching/offense change that allowed him to throw more passes, and eventually set school marks for passing touchdowns and passing yards. Hornibrook was rated as a consensus three-star recruit. After originally committing to Pittsburgh, he followed Pitt coach Paul Chryst to the University of Wisconsin over Rutgers University, University of Akron, Yale University and University of Connecticut.

== College career ==
As a freshman at Wisconsin in 2015, Hornibrook was redshirted and did not play.

The following season started with Hornibrook as a backup to senior quarterback Bart Houston. After playing two games as a reserve, Hornibrook earned his first start against Michigan State Spartans. Throughout the season, his playing and leadership skills were at points inconsistent. Although he started the rest of the games, he split playing time with Houston and eventually injured his head against Minnesota on November 26. After his injury, Hornibrook was replaced by Houston. He was eventually cleared to play in the 2017 Cotton Bowl Classic.

The March after the 2016 season, Hornibrook met with renowned quarterbacks coach George Whitlock Jr. in San Diego. In June, he attended the Manning Passing Academy. Another focus during the offseason was nutrition, as Hornibrook increased his lean body mass while decreasing his body fat. He was named the Badgers starting quarterback for the 2017 season. Inconsistent non-conference play cast scattered doubts on Hornibrook's ability early in the season, but still performed at a serviceable level. Late in the season, Hornibrook quieted doubts about interception problems in a 31–0 win against Minnesota. In the 2017 Orange Bowl against the Miami Hurricanes, Hornibrook was named the game's MVP after throwing four touchdowns completing 23 of 34 pass attempts, finishing off a 13–1 season. Hornibrook finished his Wisconsin career with the best winning percentage by any starting QB in program history he went 26-6 as the starting QB with a winning percentage of 81.3%.

On February 27, 2019, Alex Hornibrook announced he was leaving Wisconsin football's program

On March 10, 2019, Hornibrook announced his intention to transfer to Florida State as a graduate transfer and was immediately eligible under the NCAA graduate transfer rules.

=== Statistics ===
Year	Team	Games			Passing							Rushing			
Year	Team	GP	GS	Record	Comp	Att	Yards	Pct.	TD	Int	Pass Eff	Att	Yards	Avg	TD
2015	Wisconsin	Redshirted (redshirt)													
2016	Wisconsin	12	9	7–2	106	181	1,262	58.6	9	7	125.8	23	−81	−3.5	0
2017	Wisconsin	14	14	13–1	198	318	2,644	62.3	25	15	148.6	29	−101	−3.5	0
2018	Wisconsin	9	9	6–3	122	205	1,532	59.5	13	11	132.5	20	−61	−3.1	0
2019	Florida State	5	3	2–1	84	122	986	68.9	7	2	152.4	29	-71	−2.4	0
Career		40	35	28–7	510	826	6,424	61.7	54	35	138.1	101	–314	–2.9	0

== Professional career ==
Pre-draft measurables
Height	Weight	Arm length	Hand span
6 ft 3 7/8 in (1.93 m)	225 lb (102 kg)	33 in (0.84 m)	9 3/8 in (0.24 m)
All values from Pro Day

Hornibrook signed with the Jousters of The Spring League in October 2020. In his first start during the fall 2020 season, he completed 21 of 30 passes for 172 yards and an interception.

== Personal life ==
Hornibrook's relatives have played collegiate athletics or professionally in football, baseball, water polo, basketball, swimming and lacrosse. His brother, Jake, was an offensive lineman for Stanford, his sister, Mackenzie, was a captain of the Penn State swimming and diving team, his father, Jeff, was an offensive lineman for the Temple Owls, his mother, Dawn, played basketball at Gettysburg College, his uncle, Ben Davis, was the second overall pick in the 1995 MLB draft and had an eight-year long MLB career, his aunt, Megan Davis, played both soccer and lacrosse at Rutgers, and his great uncle, John, played quarterback for the Miami Hurricanes. He was an honor roll student in high school.
