= Ryan Connelly =

American football player (born 1995)

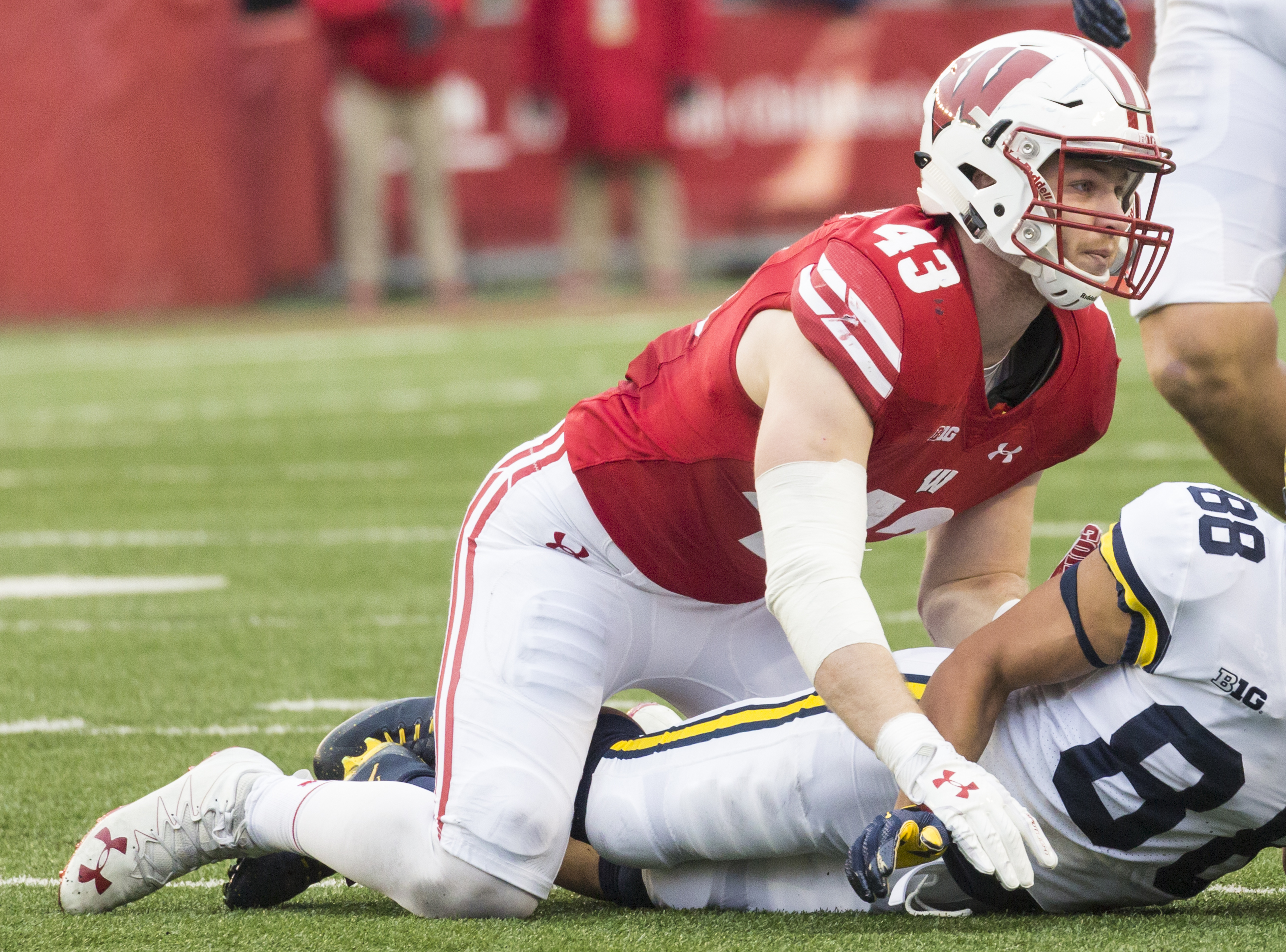
- Connelly with the Wisconsin Badgers in 2017

No. 57, 43
- Position: Linebacker

Personal information
- Born: October 23, 1995 (age 31); Eden Prairie, Minnesota, U.S.
- Listed height: 6 ft 2 in (1.88 m)
- Listed weight: 234 lb (106 kg)

Career information
- High school: Eden Prairie
- College: Wisconsin (2014–2018)
- NFL draft: 2019: 5th round, 143rd overall pick

Career history
- New York Giants (2019); Minnesota Vikings (2020–2022); New Orleans Saints (2023)*
- * Offseason or practice squad member only

Awards and highlights
- Third-team All-Big Ten (2018)

Career NFL statistics
- Total tackles: 30
- Sacks: 1
- Pass deflections: 2
- Interceptions: 2
- Stats at Pro Football Reference

Ryan Connelly (born October 23, 1995) is an American former professional football player who was a linebacker in the National Football League (NFL). He played college football for the Wisconsin Badgers. He was selected by the New York Giants in the fifth round of the 2019 NFL.

== Professional career ==
Pre-draft measurables
Height	Weight	Arm length	Hand span	40-yard dash	10-yard split	20-yard split	20-yard shuttle	Three-cone drill	Vertical jump	Broad jump	Bench press
6 ft 2 1/8 in (1.88 m)	242 lb (110 kg)	30 7/8 in (0.78 m)	9 3/8 in (0.24 m)	4.66 s	1.54 s	2.74 s	4.15 s	7.09 s	34.5 in (0.88 m)	9 ft 10 in (3.00 m)	17 reps
All values from NFL Combine/Pro Day

=== New York Giants ===
Connelly was selected by the New York Giants in the fifth round (143rd overall) of the 2019 NFL draft.

In Week 3 against the Tampa Bay Buccaneers, Connelly recorded his first interception off Jameis Winston in the 32–31 win. In Week 4, Connelly registered another interception off Case Keenum and recorded his first career sack in the 24–3 win. Unfortunately, Connelly suffered a torn ACL in the game and was ruled out for the season.

On September 5, 2020, Connelly was waived during final roster cuts.

=== Minnesota Vikings ===
On September 6, 2020, Connelly was claimed off waivers by the Minnesota Vikings. He was placed on injured reserve on December 13.

Connelly was placed on the reserve/physically unable to perform to start the season on August 23, 2022. He was activated on October 4, then waived and re-signed to the practice squad.

=== New Orleans Saints ===
On January 26, 2023, Connelly signed a reserve/future contract with the New Orleans Saints. He was released on August 29, 2023, and re-signed to the practice squad. He was not signed to a reserve/future contract and thus became a free agent at the end of the season.
