= 2018 Wisconsin Badgers football team =

American college football season

2018 Wisconsin Badgers football

Pinstripe Bowl champion

Pinstripe Bowl, W 35–3 vs. Miami (FL)
- Conference: Big Ten Conference
- West Division
- Record: 8–5 (5–4 Big Ten)
- Head coach: Paul Chryst (4th season)
- Offensive coordinator: Joe Rudolph (4th season)
- Offensive scheme: Pro-style
- Defensive coordinator: Jim Leonhard (2nd season)
- Base defense: 3–4
- MVP: Jonathan Taylor
- Captains: Ryan Connelly; Michael Deiter; D'Cota Dixon; T. J. Edwards; Alex Hornibrook; Alec Ingold
- Home stadium: Camp Randall Stadium

Uniform
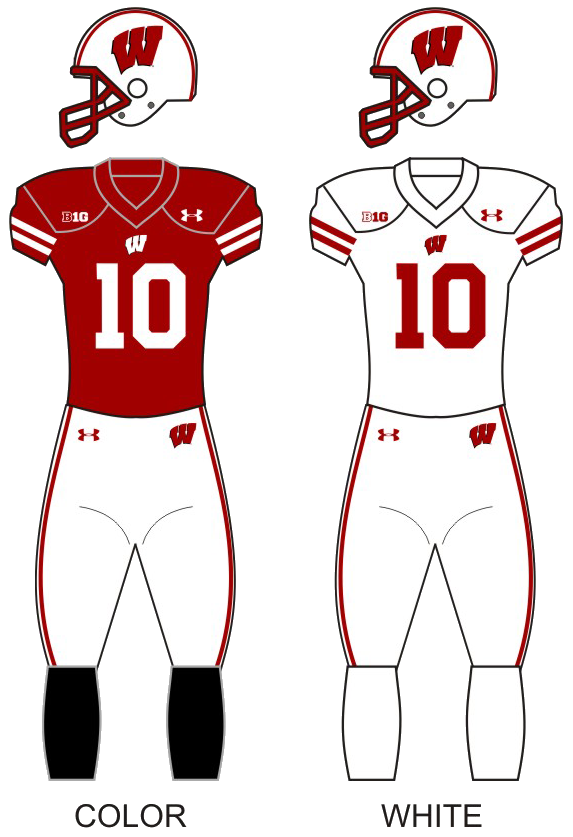

2018 Big Ten Conference football standings
	Conf.			Overall
Team	W		L	W		L
East Division
No. 3 Ohio State xy$	8	–	1	13	–	1
No. 14 Michigan x	8	–	1	10	–	3
No. 17 Penn State	6	–	3	9	–	4
Michigan State	5	–	4	7	–	6
Maryland	3	–	6	5	–	7
Indiana	2	–	7	5	–	7
Rutgers	0	–	9	1	–	11
West Division
No. 21 Northwestern xy	8	–	1	9	–	5
Wisconsin	5	–	4	8	–	5
No. 25 Iowa	5	–	4	9	–	4
Purdue	5	–	4	6	–	7
Minnesota	3	–	6	7	–	6
Nebraska	3	–	6	4	–	8
Illinois	2	–	7	4	–	8
Championship: Ohio State 45, Northwestern 24
$ – Conference champion; x – Division champion/co-champions; y – Championship game participant; Rankings from AP Poll

The 2018 Wisconsin Badgers football team represented University of Wisconsin–Madison in the 2018 NCAA Division I FBS football season. The Badgers were led by fourth year head coach Paul Chryst and competed as members of the West Division of the Big Ten Conference. They played their home games at Camp Randall Stadium in Madison, Wisconsin.

Returning many key players from their Orange Bowl-winning 2017 team, the 2018 team was expected to compete for a Big Ten title and a spot in the College Football Playoff. They were ranked fourth in the pre-season AP Poll, tied for the highest start in school history. In the third game of the year, the Badgers were upset by unranked BYU. Wisconsin ultimately lost four more games during the season, including a loss to rival Minnesota that snapped a Wisconsin 14-game winning streak in the series dating back to 2004. The Badgers were 5–4 in Big Ten play to finish in a three-way tie for second place in the West Division. They were invited to the Pinstripe Bowl to play Miami (FL) in a rematch of the 2017 Orange Bowl, where they defeated the Hurricanes once again to finish the season at 8–5.

The Badgers were led offensively by sophomore running back Jonathan Taylor, who led FBS in both rushing yards (2,194) and rushing attempts (307), and was awarded the Doak Walker Award as the nation's top running back. He became the third Badger player to eclipse the 2,000 yard mark in a single season after Ron Dayne and Melvin Gordon. Taylor was named a consensus first-team All-American, as was offensive lineman Beau Benzschawel. Four members of the offensive line received first-team all-conference honors: Benzschawel, Tyler Biadasz, Michael Deiter, and David Edwards. Quarterback Alex Hornibrook led the team in passing with 1,532 yards and 13 touchdown passes.

== Offseason ==
=== 2018 NFL draft ===
Round	Pick	Team	Player	Position
4	110	Oakland Raiders	Nick Nelson	CB
5	156	Denver Broncos	Troy Fumagalli	TE
5	164	New Orleans Saints	Natrell Jamerson	S
6	202	Tampa Bay Buccaneers	Jack Cichy	LB
7	230	Jacksonville Jaguars	Leon Jacobs	OLB

=== Recruiting ===
The Badgers signed a total of 20 recruits.

College recruiting information (2018)
Name	Hometown	School	Height	Weight	Commit date
Reggie Pearson Jr. S	River Rouge, Michigan	River Rouge High School	5 ft 10 in (1.78 m)	180 lb (82 kg)	Aug 27, 2016
Reggie Pearson Jr. S	Recruit ratings: Scout: Rivals: 247Sports: ESPN:				
Boyd Dietzen; DE	Kimberly, Wisconsin	Kimberly High School	6 ft 3 in (1.91 m)	235 lb (107 kg)	Feb 20, 2017
Boyd Dietzen; DE	Recruit ratings: Scout: Rivals: 247Sports: ESPN:				
CJ Goetz; LB	Waukesha, Wisconsin	Catholic Memorial High School	6 ft 4 in (1.93 m)	234 lb (106 kg)	Feb 20, 2017
CJ Goetz; LB	Recruit ratings: Scout: Rivals: 247Sports: ESPN:				
Mason Platter; LB	Menomonie, Wisconsin	Menomonie High School	6 ft 5 in (1.96 m)	220 lb (100 kg)	Feb 20, 2017
Mason Platter; LB	Recruit ratings: Scout: Rivals: 247Sports: ESPN:				
Michael Furtney; OT	Milan, Michigan	Milan High School	6 ft 5 in (1.96 m)	280 lb (130 kg)	Mar 14, 2017
Michael Furtney; OT	Recruit ratings: Scout: Rivals: 247Sports: ESPN:				
Jack Sanborn; LB	Lake Zurich, Illinois	Lake Zurich High School	6 ft 2 in (1.88 m)	210 lb (95 kg)	Mar 22, 2017
Jack Sanborn; LB	Recruit ratings: Scout: Rivals: 247Sports: ESPN:				
Chase Wolf; QB	Cincinnati, Ohio	St. Xavier High School	6 ft 2 in (1.88 m)	195 lb (88 kg)	May 5, 2017
Chase Wolf; QB	Recruit ratings: Scout: Rivals: 247Sports: ESPN:				
Cormac Sampson; DE	Eau Claire, Wisconsin	Memorial High School	6 ft 5 in (1.96 m)	230 lb (100 kg)	May 13, 2017
Cormac Sampson; DE	Recruit ratings: Scout: Rivals: 247Sports: ESPN:				
Isaiah Mullens; DE	Canal Winchester, Ohio	Harvest Preparatory School	6 ft 5 in (1.96 m)	280 lb (130 kg)	May 16, 2017
Isaiah Mullens; DE	Recruit ratings: Scout: Rivals: 247Sports: ESPN:				
Nakia Watson; RB	Austin, Texas	Westlake High School	5 ft 11 in (1.80 m)	212 lb (96 kg)	Jun 10, 2017
Nakia Watson; RB	Recruit ratings: Scout: Rivals: 247Sports: ESPN:				
Jaylan Franklin; TE	Gibraltar, Michigan	Carlson High School	6 ft 4 in (1.93 m)	192 lb (87 kg)	Jun 12, 2017
Jaylan Franklin; TE	Recruit ratings: Scout: Rivals: 247Sports: ESPN:				
Alexander Smith; CB	Culver City, California	Culver City High School	6 ft 0 in (1.83 m)	165 lb (75 kg)	Jun 13, 2017
Alexander Smith; CB	Recruit ratings: Scout: Rivals: 247Sports: ESPN:				
Taj Mustapha; WR	West Bloomfield, Michigan	West Bloomfield High School	6 ft 2 in (1.88 m)	175 lb (79 kg)	Jun 22, 2017
Taj Mustapha; WR	Recruit ratings: Scout: Rivals: 247Sports: ESPN:				
AJ Abbott; WR	West Bloomfield, Michigan	West Bloomfield High School	6 ft 2 in (1.88 m)	180 lb (82 kg)	Jun 23, 2017
AJ Abbott; WR	Recruit ratings: Scout: Rivals: 247Sports: ESPN:				
Aron Cruickshank; WR	Brooklyn, New York	Erasmus Hall High School	5 ft 9 in (1.75 m)	155 lb (70 kg)	Jun 27, 2017
Aron Cruickshank; WR	Recruit ratings: Scout: Rivals: 247Sports: ESPN:				
Bryson Williams; DT	Lincoln, Nebraska	Lincoln Southeast High School	6 ft 2 in (1.88 m)	290 lb (130 kg)	Jul 5, 2017
Bryson Williams; DT	Recruit ratings: Scout: Rivals: 247Sports: ESPN:				
Travian Blaylock; CB	Humble, Texas	Atascocita High School	5 ft 11 in (1.80 m)	176 lb (80 kg)	Jul 6, 2017
Travian Blaylock; CB	Recruit ratings: Scout: Rivals: 247Sports: ESPN:				
Isaac Guerendo; WR	Avon, Indiana	Avon High School	6 ft 1 in (1.85 m)	190 lb (86 kg)	Jul 6, 2017
Isaac Guerendo; WR	Recruit ratings: Scout: Rivals: 247Sports: ESPN:				
Donte Burton; CB	Loganville, Georgia	Loganville High School	6 ft 0 in (1.83 m)	174 lb (79 kg)	Oct 1, 2017
Donte Burton; CB	Recruit ratings: Scout: Rivals: 247Sports: ESPN:				
Rachad Wildgoose; DB	Miami, Florida	Northwestern High School	5 ft 11 in (1.80 m)	190 lb (86 kg)	Feb 7, 2018
Rachad Wildgoose; DB	Recruit ratings: Scout: Rivals: 247Sports: ESPN:				
Overall recruit ranking:
Note: In many cases, Scout, Rivals, 247Sports, On3, and ESPN may conflict in their listings of height and weight.; In these cases, the average was taken. ESPN grades are on a 100-point scale.; Sources: "Wisconsin Football Commitments". Rivals.; "2018 Team Ranking". Rivals.com.

== Preseason ==
=== Award watch lists ===
Award	Player	Position	Year
Lott Trophy	T. J. Edwards	LB	SR
Chuck Bednarik Award	T. J. Edwards	LB	SR
Chuck Bednarik Award	D'Cota Dixon	S	SR
Maxwell Award	Jonathan Taylor	RB	SO
Davey O'Brien Award	Alex Hornibrook	QB	JR
Doak Walker Award	Jonathan Taylor	RB	SO
John Mackey Award	Zander Neuville	TE	SR
John Mackey Award	Kyle Penniston	TE	JR
Butkus Award	Ryan Connelly	LB	SR
Butkus Award	T. J. Edwards	LB	JR
Butkus Award	Andrew Van Ginkel	LB	JR
Jim Thorpe Award	D'Cota Dixon	S	SR
Bronko Nagurski Trophy	D'Cota Dixon	S	SR
Bronko Nagurski Trophy	T. J. Edwards	LB	SR
Bronko Nagurski Trophy	Olive Sagapolu	DT	SR
Outland Trophy	Beau Benzschawel	OL	SR
Outland Trophy	Tyler Biadasz	OL	SO
Outland Trophy	Michael Deiter	OL	SR
Outland Trophy	David Edwards	OL	JR
Outland Trophy	Olive Sagapolu	DT	SR
Lou Groza Award	Rafael Gaglianone	K	SR
Ray Guy Award	Anthony Lotti	P	JR
Wuerffel Trophy	D'Cota Dixon	S	SR
Walter Camp Award	T. J. Edwards	LB	SR
Walter Camp Award	Jonathan Taylor	RB	SO
Johnny Unitas Golden Arm Award	Alex Hornibrook	QB	JR
Manning Award	Alex Hornibrook	QB	JR

== Schedule ==
Wisconsin's 2018 schedule consisted of 7 home and 5 away games in the regular season. The Badgers hosted Big Ten opponents Nebraska, Illinois, Rutgers, and Minnesota and traveled to Iowa, Michigan, Northwestern, and Penn State, and Purdue.

The team's three non–conference games were against the Western Kentucky Hilltoppers from Conference USA (C-USA), New Mexico Lobos from the Mountain West Conference (MWC), and the BYU Cougars, who compete independently in football.

Date	Time	Opponent	Rank	Site	TV	Result	Attendance
August 31	8:00 p.m.	Western Kentucky*	No. 4	Camp Randall Stadium; Madison, WI	ESPN	W 34–3	74,145
September 8	11:00 a.m.	New Mexico*	No. 5	Camp Randall Stadium; Madison, WI	BTN	W 45–14	77,003
September 15	2:30 p.m.	BYU*	No. 6	Camp Randall Stadium; Madison, WI	ABC	L 21–24	80,720
September 22	7:30 p.m.	at Iowa	No. 18	Kinnick Stadium; Iowa City, IA (Heartland Trophy)	FOX	W 28–17	69,250
October 6	6:30 p.m.	Nebraska	No. 16	Camp Randall Stadium; Madison, WI (Freedom Trophy)	BTN	W 41–24	80,051
October 13	6:30 p.m.	at No. 12 Michigan	No. 15	Michigan Stadium; Ann Arbor, MI (College GameDay)	ABC	L 13–38	111,360
October 20	11:00 a.m.	Illinois^{†}	No. 23	Camp Randall Stadium; Madison, WI	FS1	W 49–20	79,736
October 27	11:00 a.m.	at Northwestern	No. 20	Ryan Field; Evanston, IL	FOX	L 17–31	47,330
November 3	11:00 a.m.	Rutgers		Camp Randall Stadium; Madison, WI	BTN	W 31–17	74,379
November 10	11:00 a.m.	at No. 21 Penn State		Beaver Stadium; University Park, PA	ABC	L 10–22	105,396
November 17	2:30 p.m.	at Purdue		Ross-Ade Stadium; West Lafayette, IN	BTN	W 47–44 ^{3OT}	46,114
November 24	2:30 p.m.	Minnesota		Camp Randall Stadium; Madison, WI (Paul Bunyan's Axe)	ESPN2	L 15–37	74,038
December 27	4:15 p.m.	vs. Miami (FL)*		Yankee Stadium; Bronx, NY (Pinstripe Bowl)	ESPN	W 35–3	37,821
*Non-conference game; ^{†}Homecoming; Rankings from AP Poll released prior to the game; All times are in Central time

Schedule Source:

== Personnel ==
=== Roster ===
2018 Wisconsin Badgers football team roster
Players
Coaches
Offense

Pos.	#	Name	Class
WR	1	Aron Cruickshank	Fr
QB	2	Chase Wolf	Fr
WR	3	Kendric Pryor	So
WR	4	A.J. Taylor	Jr
RB	5	Chris James	Sr
WR	6	Danny Davis III	So
RB	7	Bradrick Shaw	Jr
RB	10	Isaac Guerendo	Fr
QB	12	Alex Hornibrook (C)	Jr
WR	13	Mike Gregoire	Fr
QB	15	Danny Vanden Boom	Fr
WR	16	Jack Dunn	So
QB	17	Jack Coan	So
QB	19	Nate Carter	Fr
RB	21	Mark Saari	Sr
WR	22	Cade Green	Fr
RB	23	Jonathan Taylor	So
WR	24	Adam Krumholz	So
RB	25	Nakia Watson	Fr
RB	28	Taiwan Deal	Sr
WR	28	Brady Schipper	Fr
FB	30	Coy Wanner	Fr
FB	32	Jake Collinsworth	Fr
RB	36	Hunter Johnson	Fr
RB	37	Garrett Groshek	So
TE	41	Jack Eschenbach	Fr
FB	44	John Chenal	Fr
FB	45	Alec Ingold (C)	Jr
TE	46	Gabe Lloyd	So
TE	49	Kyle Penniston	Jr
OL	59	Andrew Lyons	Fr
OL	60	Logan Bruss	Fr
OL	61	Tyler Biadasz	So
OL	62	Patrick Kasl	So
OL	63	Michael Deiter (C)	Sr
OL	65	Tyler Beach	Fr
OL	66	Beau Benzschawel	Sr
OL	67	Jon Dietzen	Jr
OL	68	David Moorman	Jr
OL	70	Josh Seltzner	Fr
OL	71	Cole Van Lanen	So
OL	73	Alex Fenton	Fr
OL	74	Michael Furtney	Fr
OL	75	Micah Kapoi	Sr
OL	77	Blake Smithback (injured)	Fr
OL	78	Jason Erdmann	Jr
OL	79	David Edwards (C)	Jr
WR	81	Taj Mustapha	Fr
WR	82	Emmet Perry	Fr
TE	84	Jake Ferguson	Fr
TE	85	Zander Neuville	Sr
TE	86	Luke Benzschawel	So
WR	87	Quintez Cephus	Jr
WR	89	A.J. Abbott	Fr
TE	96	Cormac Sampson	Fr

Defense

Pos.	#	Name	Class
CB	4	Donte Burton	Fr
CB	5	Rachad Wildgoose	Fr
S	7	Reggie Pearson	Fr
CB	8	Deron Harrell	Fr
S	9	Scott Nelson	Fr
S	10	Seth Currens	So
CB	11	Alexander Smith	Fr
S	13	Evan Bondoc	Sr
S	14	D'Cota Dixon (C)	Sr
OLB	17	Andrew Van Ginkel	Sr
S	18	Collin Wilder	Jr
S	19	John Torchio	Fr
CB	20	Faion Hicks	Fr
CB	21	Caesar Williams	So
ILB	22	Jacob Heyroth	Fr
ILB	23	Mason Stokke	So
S	25	Eric Burrell	So
CB	26	Travian Blaylock	Fr
CB	27	Cristian Volpentesta	So
S	30	Tyler Mais	Fr
CB	31	Madison Cone	So
OLB	32	Marty Strey	Fr
ILB	34	C.J. Goetz	Fr
CB	36	Kobe Knaak	So
ILB	37	Ethan Cesarz	Fr
OLB	38	Paul Jackson	Jr
OLB	41	Noah Burks	So
OLB	42	Jaylan Franklin	Fr
ILB	43	Ryan Connelly (C)	Sr
OLB	46	Hegeman Tiedt	So
ILB	47	Griffin Grady	So
OLB	48	Mason Platter (injured)	Fr
OLB	50	Izayah Green-May	Fr
DE	52	David Pfaff	Jr
ILB	53	T. J. Edwards	Sr
ILB	54	Chris Orr	Jr
OLB	55	Christian Bell	So
OLB	56	Zack Baun	Jr
DE	57	Michael Balistreri	Fr
ILB	57	Jack Sanborn	Fr
ILB	58	Mike Maskalunas	So
OLB	59	Tyler Johnson	Jr
DE	69	Aaron Vopal	Fr
NT	74	Gunnar Roberge	Jr
NT	76	Kayden Lyles	Fr
DE	90	Isaiah Mullens	Fr
NT	91	Bryson Williams	Fr
DE	92	Matt Henningsen	Fr
DE	93	Garrett Rand (injured)	Jr
DE	94	Boyd Dietzen	Fr
DE	95	Keldric Preston	So
DE	97	Isaiahh Loudermilk	So
DE	98	Kraig Howe	Jr
NT	99	Olive Sagapolu	Sr

Special teams

Pos.	#	Name	Class
P	15	Anthony Lotti	Jr
K	27	Rafael Gaglianone	Sr
P	38	P.J. Rosowski	Sr
K	39	Zach Hintze	Jr
LS	51	Adam Bay	So
LS	52	Josh Bernhagen	So
P	90	Connor Allen	Jr
P	96	Conor Schlichting	Fr
K	98	Collin Larsh	Fr

Head coach

- Paul Chryst (Wisconsin)

Coordinators/assistant coaches

- Joe Rudolph (Wisconsin)
  Associate head coach, offensive coordinator, offensive line
- Jim Leonhard (Wisconsin)
  Defensive coordinator, defensive backs
- Bobby April (Louisiana-Lafayette)
  Outside linebackers
- Bob Bostad (Wisconsin–Stevens Point)
  Inside linebackers
- Inoke Breckterfield (Oregon State)
  Defensive line
- Jon Budmayr (Wisconsin)
  Quarterbacks
- Ted Gilmore (Wyoming)
  Offensive pass game coordinator, wide receivers
- Chris Haering (West Virginia)
  Special teams
- John Settle (Appalachian State)
  Running backs
- Mickey Turner (Wisconsin)
  Tight ends
- Ross Kolodziej (Wisconsin)
  Head strength and conditioning coach

Legend

- (C) Team captain
- (S) Suspended
- (I) Ineligible
- Injured
- Redshirt

Roster
Last update: September 6, 2018

== Game summaries ==
=== Western Kentucky ===
	1	2	3	4	Total
Hilltoppers	0	0	3	0	3
No. 4 Badgers	7	17	3	7	34

=== New Mexico ===
	1	2	3	4	Total
Lobos	7	0	0	7	14
No. 5 Badgers	3	7	14	21	45

=== BYU ===
	1	2	3	4	Total
Cougars	7	7	7	3	24
No. 6 Badgers	7	7	0	7	21

=== At Iowa ===
	1	2	3	4	Total
No. 18 Badgers	0	7	7	14	28
Hawkeyes	0	7	10	0	17

=== Nebraska ===
	1	2	3	4	Total
Cornhuskers	0	3	14	7	24
No. 16 Badgers	3	17	14	7	41

=== At Michigan ===
	1	2	3	4	Total
No. 15 Badgers	0	7	0	6	13
No. 12 Wolverines	0	13	8	17	38

=== Illinois ===
	1	2	3	4	Total
Fighting Illini	0	10	7	3	20
No. 23 Badgers	14	14	14	7	49

=== At Northwestern ===
	1	2	3	4	Total
No. 20 Badgers	7	3	0	7	17
Wildcats	7	7	10	7	31

=== Rutgers ===
	1	2	3	4	Total
Scarlet Knights	0	0	3	14	17
Badgers	7	3	14	7	31

=== At Penn State ===
	1	2	3	4	Total
Badgers	7	0	3	0	10
Nittany Lions	10	6	3	3	22

=== At Purdue ===
	1	2	3	4	OT	2OT	3OT	Total
Badgers	0	3	10	14	7	7	6	47
Boilermakers	0	10	14	3	7	7	3	44

=== Minnesota ===
	1	2	3	4	Total
Golden Gophers	3	14	6	14	37
Badgers	0	7	0	8	15

=== vs Miami (FL)–Pinstripe Bowl ===
	1	2	3	4	Total
Hurricanes	3	0	0	0	3
Badgers	14	0	7	14	35

== Rankings ==
Ranking movements Legend: ██ Increase in ranking ██ Decrease in ranking — = Not ranked RV = Received votes ( ) = First-place votes
	Week															
Poll	Pre	1	2	3	4	5	6	7	8	9	10	11	12	13	14	Final
AP	4 (1)	5 (1)	6 (1)	18	15	16	15	23	20	RV	RV	—	RV	—	—	RV
Coaches	7	6	6	16	13	12	10	19	19	RV	RV	RV	RV	RV	—	RV
CFP	Not released									—	—	—	—	—	—	Not released

== Awards and honors ==
Individual Awards
Player	Award	Ref.
Jake Wood	Dungy–Thompson Humanitarian Award	
Jonathan Taylor	Doak Walker Award; Ameche–Dayne Running Back of the Year	
Michael Deiter	Rimington–Pace Offensive Lineman of the Year	

All-Big Ten
Player	Position	Coaches	Media
Jonathan Taylor	RB	1	1
Tyler Biadasz	C	1	1
Michael Deiter	OG	1	1
Beau Benzschawel	OG	1	1
David Edwards	OT	2	1
T. J. Edwards	LB	2	1
D'Cota Dixon	DB	3	3
Ryan Connelly	LB	3	Hon.
Jake Ferguson	TE	Hon.	Hon.
Rafael Gaglianone	K	Hon.	–
Andrew Van Ginkel	LB	–	Hon.
Hon. = Honorable mention. Reference:

== Players drafted into the NFL ==
Round	Pick	Player	Position	NFL Club
3	78	Michael Deiter	G	Miami Dolphins
5	143	Ryan Connelly	LB	New York Giants
5	151	Andrew Van Ginkel	LB	Miami Dolphins
5	169	David Edwards	OL	Los Angeles Rams

=== Signed undrafted free agents ===
- Beau Benzschawel, OL, Detroit Lions
- T. J. Edwards, LB, Philadelphia Eagles
- Alec Ingold, FB, Oakland Raiders
