= 2018 Northwestern Wildcats football team =

American college football season

2018 Northwestern Wildcats football

Big Ten West Division champion Holiday Bowl champion

Big Ten Championship Game, L 24–45 vs. Ohio State

Holiday Bowl, W 31–20 vs. Utah
- Conference: Big Ten Conference
- West Division

Ranking
- Coaches: No. 19
- AP: No. 21
- Record: 9–5 (8–1 Big Ten)
- Head coach: Pat Fitzgerald (13th season)
- Offensive coordinator: Mick McCall (11th season)
- Offensive scheme: Spread
- Defensive coordinator: Mike Hankwitz (11th season)
- Base defense: Multiple 4–3
- Home stadium: Ryan Field

2018 Big Ten Conference football standings
	Conf.			Overall
Team	W		L	W		L
East Division
No. 3 Ohio State xy$	8	–	1	13	–	1
No. 14 Michigan x	8	–	1	10	–	3
No. 17 Penn State	6	–	3	9	–	4
Michigan State	5	–	4	7	–	6
Maryland	3	–	6	5	–	7
Indiana	2	–	7	5	–	7
Rutgers	0	–	9	1	–	11
West Division
No. 21 Northwestern xy	8	–	1	9	–	5
Wisconsin	5	–	4	8	–	5
No. 25 Iowa	5	–	4	9	–	4
Purdue	5	–	4	6	–	7
Minnesota	3	–	6	7	–	6
Nebraska	3	–	6	4	–	8
Illinois	2	–	7	4	–	8
Championship: Ohio State 45, Northwestern 24
$ – Conference champion; x – Division champion/co-champions; y – Championship game participant; Rankings from AP Poll

The 2018 Northwestern Wildcats football team represented Northwestern University during the 2018 NCAA Division I FBS football season. The Wildcats played their home games at Ryan Field in Evanston, Illinois and competed in the West Division of the Big Ten Conference. They were led by 13th-year head coach Pat Fitzgerald.

Northwestern began the year with a 1–3 record after winning its conference road opener against Purdue but falling to non-conference foes Duke and Akron, as well as Michigan in their conference home opener. The team won their next four games, including wins over ranked opponents Michigan State and Wisconsin, before falling to Notre Dame, which secured a winless non-conference slate. Regardless, the Wildcats clinched their first Big Ten West Division title by defeating No. 21 Iowa the following week. They won their remaining two conference games to finish the regular season with a conference record of 8–1. In the 2018 Big Ten Football Championship Game, they lost to East Division champion Ohio State 45–24. The team was invited to the Holiday Bowl to play Pac-12 Conference runner-up Utah. The Wildcats won by a score of 31–20, their third consecutive bowl victory, which was a program first. In the final AP Poll of the season, the Wildcats were ranked 21st.

Quarterback Clayton Thorson led the team's offense, finishing with 3,183 passing yards, third most in the Big Ten Conference, to go along with 17 passing touchdowns and nine rushing touchdowns. Thorson, a fourth-year starter, finished his career as the school's all-time leading passer. Freshman running back Isaiah Bowser led the team in rushing with 866 yards, and wide receiver Flynn Nagel led the team in receiving with 780 yards. On defense, linebacker Blake Gallagher led the Big Ten in total tackles with 127. Fellow linebacker Paddy Fisher was named first team all-conference by the coaches, while defensive back Montre Hartage was named to the first team by the media. Head coach Pat Fitzgerald received the conference's coach of the year award.

== Preseason ==
=== Award watch lists ===
Award	Player	Position	Year
Lott Trophy	Nate Hall	LB	SR
Chuck Bednarik Award	Joe Gaziano	DE	JR
Chuck Bednarik Award	Paddy Fisher	LB	SO
Maxwell Award	Clayton Thorson	QB	SR
Doak Walker Award	Jeremy Larkin	RB	JR
Butkus Award	Paddy Fisher	LB	FR
Bronko Nagurski Trophy	Paddy Fisher	LB	SO
Bronko Nagurski Trophy	Joe Gaziano	DE	JR
Outland Trophy	Tommy Doles	OL	SR
Wuerffel Trophy	Tommy Doles	OL	SR
Johnny Unitas Golden Arm Award	Clayton Thorson	QB	SR

== Schedule ==
Date	Time	Opponent	Rank	Site	TV	Result	Attendance
August 30	7:00 p.m.	at Purdue		Ross-Ade Stadium; West Lafayette, IN	ESPN	W 31–27	47,410
September 8	11:00 a.m.	Duke*		Ryan Field; Evanston, IL	ESPNU	L 7–21	40,654
September 15	6:30 p.m.	Akron*		Ryan Field; Evanston, IL	BTN	L 34–39	40,014
September 29	3:30 p.m.	No. 14 Michigan		Ryan Field; Evanston, IL (rivalry)	FOX	L 17–20	47,330
October 6	11:00 a.m.	at No. 20 Michigan State		Spartan Stadium; East Lansing, MI	FS1	W 29–19	72,850
October 13	11:00 a.m.	Nebraska^{†}		Ryan Field; Evanston, IL	ABC	W 34–31 ^{OT}	47,330
October 20	11:00 a.m.	at Rutgers		HighPoint.com Stadium; Piscataway, NJ	BTN	W 18–15	32,514
October 27	11:00 a.m.	No. 20 Wisconsin		Ryan Field; Evanston, IL	FOX	W 31–17	47,330
November 3	6:15 p.m.	No. 4 Notre Dame*		Ryan Field; Evanston, IL (rivalry)	ESPN	L 21–31	47,330
November 10	2:30 p.m.	at No. 21 Iowa		Kinnick Stadium; Iowa City, IA	FOX	W 14–10	66,493
November 17	11:00 a.m.	at Minnesota	No. 22	TCF Bank Stadium; Minneapolis, MN	BTN	W 24–14	32,134
November 24	2:30 p.m.	Illinois	No. 19	Ryan Field; Evanston, IL (rivalry)	BTN	W 24–16	37,124
December 1	7:00 p.m.	vs. No. 6 Ohio State	No. 21	Lucas Oil Stadium; Indianapolis, IN (Big Ten Championship)	FOX	L 24–45	66,375
December 31	6:00 p.m.	vs. No. 17 Utah*	No. 22	SDCCU Stadium; San Diego, CA (Holiday Bowl)	FS1	W 31–20	47,007
*Non-conference game; ^{†}Homecoming; Rankings from AP Poll and CFP Rankings after October 30 released prior to game; All times are in Central time

== Game summaries ==
=== At Purdue ===
	1	2	3	4	Total
Wildcats	14	17	0	0	31
Boilermakers	14	3	7	3	27

Scoring summary

Quarter	Time	Drive			Team	Scoring information	Score	
Quarter	Time	Plays	Yards	TOP	Team	Scoring information	NU	PUR
1	7:58	11	64	4:42	NU	Jeremy Larkin 1-yard touchdown run, Charlie Kuhbander kick good	7	0
1	5:34	5	65	1:09	NU	John Moten IV 2-yard touchdown run, Charlie Kuhbander kick good	14	0
1	4:20	4	60	1:14	PUR	Rondale Moore 32-yard touchdown reception from Elijah Sindelar, Spencer Evans kick good	14	7
1	1:02	3	85	1:20	PUR	Rondale Moore 76-yard touchdown run, Spencer Evans kick good	14	14
2	13:37	8	59	2:25	NU	34-yard field goal by Charlie Kuhbander	17	14
2	7:06	3	55	0:58	NU	T.J. Green 1-yard touchdown run, Charlie Kuhbander kick good	24	14
2	3:44	10	44	3:22	PUR	38-yard field goal by Spencer Evans	24	17
2	0:37	5	30	2:04	NU	Jeremy Larkin 4-yard touchdown run, Charlie Kuhbander kick good	31	17
3	11:37	6	71	1:52	PUR	D.J. Knox 2-yard touchdown run, Spencer Evans kick good	31	24
4	14:56	13	76	6:36	PUR	27-yard field goal by Spencer Evans	31	27
"TOP" = time of possession. For other American football terms, see Glossary of American football.								

=== Duke ===
	1	2	3	4	Total
Blue Devils	0	21	0	0	21
Wildcats	7	0	0	0	7

=== Akron ===
	1	2	3	4	Total
Zips	0	3	23	13	39
Wildcats	7	14	7	6	34

=== Michigan ===
	1	2	3	4	Total
No. 14 Wolverines	0	7	6	7	20
Wildcats	10	7	0	0	17

=== At Michigan State ===
	1	2	3	4	Total
Wildcats	7	7	0	15	29
No. 20 Spartans	3	3	13	0	19

=== Nebraska ===
	1	2	3	4	OT	Total
Cornhuskers	7	6	7	11	0	31
Wildcats	0	14	0	17	3	34

=== At Rutgers ===
	1	2	3	4	Total
Wildcats	7	0	3	8	18
Scarlet Knights	0	12	3	0	15

=== Wisconsin ===
	1	2	3	4	Total
No. 20 Badgers	7	3	0	7	17
Wildcats	7	7	10	7	31

=== Notre Dame ===
	1	2	3	4	Total
No. 3 Fighting Irish	7	0	14	10	31
Wildcats	0	7	0	14	21

=== At Iowa ===
	1	2	3	4	Total
Wildcats	0	0	7	7	14
No. 21 Hawkeyes	0	3	7	0	10

=== At Minnesota ===
	1	2	3	4	Total
No. 24 Wildcats	7	6	0	11	24
Golden Gophers	0	7	0	7	14

=== Illinois ===
	1	2	3	4	Total
Fighting Illini	3	3	0	10	16
No. 20 Wildcats	7	14	3	0	24

=== Vs. Ohio State (Big Ten Championship game) ===
	1	2	3	4	Total
No. 21 Wildcats	7	0	14	3	24
No. 6 Buckeyes	14	10	7	14	45

=== Vs. Utah (Holiday Bowl) ===
	1	2	3	4	Total
No. 20 Utes	14	6	0	0	20
Wildcats	0	3	28	0	31

== Rankings ==
Ranking movements Legend: ██ Increase in ranking ██ Decrease in ranking — = Not ranked RV = Received votes
	Week															
Poll	Pre	1	2	3	4	5	6	7	8	9	10	11	12	13	14	Final
AP	RV	RV	—	—	—	—	—	—	—	RV	RV	24	20	21	RV	21
Coaches	RV	RV	—	—	—	—	—	—	—	RV	RV	RV	21	21	22	19
CFP	Not released									—	—	22	19	21	22	Not released

== Roster ==
2018 Northwestern Wildcats football team roster
Players
Coaches
Offense

Pos.	#	Name	Class
RB	1	Chad Hanaoka	Sr
WR	2	Flynn Nagel	Sr
WR	4	Solomon Vault	Sr
WR	5	Charles Fessler	Jr
WR	6	Jelani Roberts	Sr
QB	7	Jason Whittaker	Fr
WR	8	Kyric McGowan	So
QB	10	T. J. Green	Jr
QB	11	Aidan Smith	So
WR	12	J. J. Jefferson	Fr
QB	13	Andrew Marty	Fr
WR	15	Jace James	So
QB	15	Hunter Johnson (I)	So
WR	16	Berkeley Holman	Fr
WR	17	Jalen Brown	Sr
QB	18	Clayton Thorson	Sr
WR	19	Riley Lees	So
RB	20	John Moten IV	Jr
RB	21	Drake Anderson	Fr
WR	23	Steven Reese	Jr
RB	24	Alex Bousky	Sr
RB	25	Isaiah Bowser	Fr
RB	28	Jeremy Larkin	So
RB	36	Jesse Brown	So
SB	44	James Prather	Sr
SB	48	Brian Kaiser	Fr
OL	52	Sam Gerak	Fr
OL	57	Cam Kolwich	So
OL	59	J. B. Butler	Sr
OL	61	Jason Goosen	So
OL	65	Jared Thomas	Jr
OL	66	Nik Urban	So
OL	67	Willy Boatman	Fr
OL	68	Wyatt Blake	Fr
OL	69	Charlie Schmidt	Fr
OL	70	Rashawn Slater	So
OL	71	Tommy Doles	Sr
OL	72	Blake Hance	Sr
OL	73	Gunnar Vogel	So
OL	74	Payne He'Bert	Fr
OL	76	Ethan Wiederkehr	Fr
OL	77	Jesse Meyler	So
OL	78	Sam Stovall	Fr
OL	79	Trey Klock	Sr
SB	80	Trey Pugh	So
WR	81	Ramaud Chiaokhiao-Bowman	So
SB	82	Alex Oelsner	Fr
WR	83	Will Lansbury	Fr
WR	84	Cameron Green	Jr
WR	85	Jack Tirmonia	So
SB	86	Cody Link	So
WR	86	Raymond Niro III	Fr
SB	87	Eric Eshoo	So
WR	88	Ben Skowronek	Jr
SB	89	Charlie Mangieri	Fr

Defense

Pos.	#	Name	Class
DB	3	Trae Williams	Jr
DB	7	Travis Whillock	So
DB	9	Roderick Campbell	So
DB	10	Alonzo Mayo	Jr
DB	11	A. J. Hampton	Fr
DB	13	J. R. Pace	So
DB	18	Cameron Ruiz	Fr
DB	22	Bryce Jackson	Fr
CB	24	Montre Hartage	Sr
DB	25	Austin Hiller	Fr
DB	26	Brian Bullock	So
DB	27	Jeremiah McDonald	Fr
LB	28	Chris Bergin	So
DB	29	Greg Newsome II	Fr
LB	31	Jaylen Rivers	Fr
LB	32	Nate Hall	Sr
LB	33	Grayson Mann	Fr
LB	34	Chee Anyanwu	Fr
LB	35	Erik Mueller	Fr
DB	37	Donovan Sermons	Fr
LB	40	Peter McIntyre	Fr
S	41	Jared McGee	Sr
LB	42	Paddy Fisher	So
LB	44	Khalid Jones	Fr
LB	45	Nathan Fox	Jr
LB	46	Troy Hudetz	So
DL	46	Devin O'Rourke	Fr
DB	47	Joe Bergin	Jr
LB	50	Jango Glackin	So
LB	51	Blake Gallagher	So
DL	53	Eku Leota	Fr
DL	54	Trent Goens	Jr
DE	55	Mark Gooden	So
DL	75	Ben Oxley	Sr
DT	90	Jake Saunders	So
DL	91	Samdup Miller	So
DL	92	Fred Wyatt	Sr
DL	93	Joe Spivak	So
DE	94	Tommy Carnifax	So
DL	95	Alex Miller	Jr
DE	96	Trevor Kent	Fr
DL	97	Joe Gaziano	Jr
DE	98	Earnest Brown IV	So
DL	99	Jordan Thompson	Sr

Special teams

Pos.	#	Name	Class
K	14	Charlie Kuhbander	So
P	17	Daniel Kubiuk	Sr
P	37	Cody Gronewold	Fr
K, P	38	Drew Luckenbaugh	So
LS	43	Tyler Gillikin	So
LS	48	Peter Snodgrass	Fr
P	49	Jake Collins	Sr

Head coach

- Pat Fitzgerald

Coordinators/assistant coaches

- Lou Ayeni (running backs / recruiting coordinator)
- Adam Cushing (offensive line)
- Jeff Genyk (special teams coordinator)
- Mike Hankwitz (defensive coordinator)
- Bob Heffner (Superbacks)
- Marty Long (defensive line)
- Matt McPherson (Associate head coach / defensive backs)
- Mick McCall (offensive coordinator / quarterbacks)
- Tim McGarigle (linebackers)
- Dennis Springer (wide receivers)
- Chris Bowers (director of player personnel)
- Cody Cejda (director of football operations)
- Darby Dunnagan (director of Video Operations)
- Jay Hooten (director of Sports Performance for Football)
- Jacob Schmidt (director of player development)
- Bryan Payton (director of Recruiting Communications)
- Jonny Kovach (director of Recruiting Operations)
- Todd McShane (director of Scouting)
- John Holloway (assistant director of football operations)
- Deonte Gibson (defensive graduate assistant)
- Kevin Koch (defensive graduate assistant)
- Traveon Henry (offensive graduate assistant)
- Sean Pearson (offensive graduate assistant)

Legend

- (C) Team captain
- (S) Suspended
- (I) Ineligible
- Injured
- Redshirt

Roster
Last update: August 16, 2018

== Awards and honors ==
Individual Awards
Player	Award	Ref.
Pat Fitzgerald	Hayes–Schembechler Coach of the Year; Dave McClain Coach of the Year	

All-Big Ten
Player	Position	Coaches	Media
Paddy Fisher	LB	1	2
Montre Hartage	DB	3	1
Joe Gaziano	DL	2	3
Rashawn Slater	OT	3	HM
Blake Gallagher	LB	HM	3
Cameron Green	WR	HM	HM
Clayton Thorson	QB	HM	HM
Flynn Nagel	WR	HM	HM
J.R. Pace	DB	HM	HM
Nate Hall	DB	HM	HM
HM = Honorable mention. Reference:

== Players drafted into the NFL ==
Round	Pick	Player	Position	NFL Club
5	167	Clayton Thorson	QB	Philadelphia Eagles
