= 2018 Illinois Fighting Illini football team =

American college football season

2018 Illinois Fighting Illini football
- Conference: Big Ten Conference
- West Division
- Record: 4–8 (2–7 Big Ten)
- Head coach: Lovie Smith (3rd season)
- Offensive coordinator: Rod Smith (1st season)
- Offensive scheme: Multiple
- Defensive coordinator: Hardy Nickerson (3rd season)
- Base defense: 4–3
- Home stadium: Memorial Stadium

2018 Big Ten Conference football standings
	Conf.			Overall
Team	W		L	W		L
East Division
No. 3 Ohio State xy$	8	–	1	13	–	1
No. 14 Michigan x	8	–	1	10	–	3
No. 17 Penn State	6	–	3	9	–	4
Michigan State	5	–	4	7	–	6
Maryland	3	–	6	5	–	7
Indiana	2	–	7	5	–	7
Rutgers	0	–	9	1	–	11
West Division
No. 21 Northwestern xy	8	–	1	9	–	5
Wisconsin	5	–	4	8	–	5
No. 25 Iowa	5	–	4	9	–	4
Purdue	5	–	4	6	–	7
Minnesota	3	–	6	7	–	6
Nebraska	3	–	6	4	–	8
Illinois	2	–	7	4	–	8
Championship: Ohio State 45, Northwestern 24
$ – Conference champion; x – Division champion/co-champions; y – Championship game participant; Rankings from AP Poll

The 2018 Illinois Fighting Illini football team was an American football team that represented the University of Illinois Urbana-Champaign as a member of the Big Ten Conference during the 2018 NCAA Division I FBS football season. In their third season under head coach Lovie Smith, the Fighting Illini compiled a 4–8 record (2–7 in conference games), finished in last place out of seven teams in the Big Ten's West Division, and were outscored by a total of 473 to 312.

The team's statistical leaders included quarterback AJ Bush (1,413 passing yards), running back Reggie Corbin (1,085 rushing yards, 8.5 yards per attempt), wide receiver Ricky Smalling (33 receptions for 406 yards), and kicker Chase McLaughlin (96 points scored, 36 of 36 extra points, 20 of 25 field goals). McLaughlin was the only Illinois player to receive first-team honors on the 2018 All-Big Ten Conference football team.

The team played its home games at Memorial Stadium in Champaign, Illinois.

== Offseason ==
=== Recruiting ===
==== Position key ====
Back	B	Center	C	Cornerback	CB	Defensive back	DB
Defensive end	DE	Defensive lineman	DL	Defensive tackle	DT	End	E
Fullback	FB	Guard	G	Halfback	HB	Kicker	K
Kickoff returner	KR	Offensive tackle	OT	Offensive lineman	OL	Linebacker	LB
Long snapper	LS	Punter	P	Punt returner	PR	Quarterback	QB
Running back	RB	Safety	S	Tight end	TE	Wide receiver	WR

==== Recruits ====
The Fighting Illini signed a total of 17 recruits on Early National Signing Day on December 20, 2017.

=== Award watch lists ===
Listed in the order that they were released

Award	Player	Position	Year
John Mackey Award	Louis Dorsey	TE	SO
Wuerffel Trophy	Nick Allegretti	OL	SR

== Schedule ==
The 2018 schedule consisted of seven home and five away games in the regular season. The Fighting Illini hosted Big Ten foes Penn State, Purdue, Minnesota, Iowa, and traveled to Rutgers, Wisconsin, Maryland, Nebraska and Northwestern.

The Fighting Illini hosted all three non-conference opponents, Kent State from the Mid-American Conference, Western Illinois from Missouri Valley Football Conference, and South Florida from the American Athletic Conference. The South Florida game was played at Soldier Field, home of the Chicago Bears.

Date	Time	Opponent	Site	TV	Result	Attendance
September 1	11:00 a.m.	Kent State*	Memorial Stadium; Champaign, IL	BTN	W 31–24	31,898
September 8	6:30 p.m.	Western Illinois*	Memorial Stadium; Champaign, IL	BTN	W 34–14	39,252
September 15	2:30 p.m.	vs. South Florida*	Soldier Field; Chicago, IL	BTN	L 19–25	21,725
September 21	8:00 p.m.	No. 10 Penn State	Memorial Stadium; Champaign, IL	FS1	L 24–63	34,704
October 6	11:00 a.m.	at Rutgers	HighPoint.com Stadium; Piscataway, NJ	BTN	W 38–17	36,702
October 13	2:30 p.m.	Purdue^{†}	Memorial Stadium; Champaign, IL (rivalry)	FS1	L 7–46	41,966
October 20	11:00 a.m.	at No. 23 Wisconsin	Camp Randall Stadium; Madison, WI	FS1	L 20–49	79,736
October 27	2:30 p.m.	at Maryland	Maryland Stadium; College Park, MD	BTN	L 33–63	30,387
November 3	2:30 p.m.	Minnesota	Memorial Stadium; Champaign, IL	BTN	W 55–31	35,774
November 10	11:00 a.m.	at Nebraska	Memorial Stadium; Lincoln, NE	BTN	L 35–54	88,316
November 17	2:30 p.m.	Iowa	Memorial Stadium; Champaign, IL	BTN	L 0–63	33,313
November 24	2:30 p.m.	at No. 20 Northwestern	Ryan Field; Evanston, IL (rivalry)	BTN	L 16–24	37,124
*Non-conference game; ^{†}Homecoming; Rankings from AP Poll released prior to the game; All times are in Central time

== Game summaries ==
=== Kent State ===
	1	2	3	4	Total
Golden Flashes	7	10	7	0	24
Fighting Illini	3	0	21	7	31

=== Western Illinois ===
	1	2	3	4	Total
Leathernecks	7	0	7	0	14
Fighting Illini	0	14	10	10	34

=== South Florida ===
	1	2	3	4	Total
Bulls	7	0	0	18	25
Fighting Illini	10	6	3	0	19

=== Penn State ===
	1	2	3	4	Total
No. 10 Nittany Lions	7	14	7	35	63
Fighting Illini	7	10	7	0	24

=== At Rutgers ===
	1	2	3	4	Total
Fighting Illini	10	14	0	14	38
Scarlet Knights	7	7	0	3	17

=== Purdue ===
	1	2	3	4	Total
Boilermakers	14	15	7	10	46
Fighting Illini	7	0	0	0	7

=== At Wisconsin ===
	1	2	3	4	Total
Fighting Illini	0	10	7	3	20
No. 23 Badgers	14	14	14	7	49

=== At Maryland ===
	1	2	3	4	Total
Fighting Illini	3	6	10	14	33
Terrapins	14	14	21	14	63

=== Minnesota ===
	1	2	3	4	Total
Golden Gophers	7	10	0	14	31
Fighting Illini	14	10	21	10	55

=== At Nebraska ===
	1	2	3	4	Total
Fighting Illini	14	7	0	14	35
Cornhuskers	21	17	7	9	54

=== Iowa ===
	1	2	3	4	Total
Hawkeyes	7	28	14	14	63
Fighting Illini	0	0	0	0	0

=== At Northwestern ===
	1	2	3	4	Total
Fighting Illini	3	3	0	10	16
No. 20 Wildcats	7	14	3	0	24

== Roster ==
2018 Illinois Fighting Illini football team roster
Players
Coaches
Offense

Pos.	#	Name	Class
QB	1	A. J. Bush	Sr
RB	2	Reggie Corbin	Jr
RB	3	Jakari Norwood	Fr
WR	4	Ricky Smalling	So
WR	5	Carmoni Green	So
WR	6	Dominic Stampley	So
QB	7	Coran Taylor	Fr
QB	8	M. J. Rivers II	Fr
WR	9	Sam Mays	Sr
QB	10	Cam Thomas	So
WR	11	Carlos Sandy	Fr
QB	12	Matt Robinson	Fr
TE	13	Caleb Reams	Jr
QB	14	Drake Davis	Fr
QB	15	Trenard Davis	Jr
QB	16	Cam Miller	So
WR	18	Mike Dudek	Sr
TE	19	Louis Dorsey	So
RB	21	Ra'Von Bonner	So
RB	22	Kenyon Sims	Fr
RB	25	Dre Brown	Jr
RB	26	Mike Epstein	So
LB	32	Justice Williams	Jr
TE	36	Austin Roberts	Sr
WR	37	Zach Holman	Sr
OL	52	Adam Solomon	Jr
OL	53	Nick Allegretti	Sr
OL	55	Kendrick Green	Fr
OL	58	Preston Engel	Fr
OL	63	Alex Palczewski	Fr
OL	65	Doug Kramer	So
OL	66	Jordyn Slaughter	Fr
OL	68	Jake Stover	Fr
OL	70	Reuben Unije	Fr
OL	71	Zeke Martin	Jr
OL	72	Kievan Myers	Fr
OL	73	Jake Cerny	So
OL	74	Andrew Trainer	Jr
OL	75	Kurt Gavin	So
OL	76	Larry Boyd	So
OL	79	Vederian Lowe	So
WR	80	Edwin Carter	Fr
TE	81	Griffin Palmer	So
WR	82	Dylan Thomas	Fr
TE	83	Bobby Walker	Jr
WR	84	Jordan Holmes	Fr
WR	85	Cam Stacy	Fr
WR	86	Donny Navarro (I)	So
TE	87	Daniel Barker	Fr
TE	88	Brandon Jones	So
TE	89	Alex Pihlstrom	Fr

Defense

Pos.	#	Name	Class
LB	3	Del'Shawn Phillips	Sr
DB	4	Bennett Williams	So
LB	5	Milo Eifler (I)	So
DB	6	Tony Adams	So
DB	7	Stanley Green	Jr
DB	8	Nate Hobbs	So
LB	9	Dele Harding	Jr
LB	10	James Knight	So
DB	15	Delano Ware	Fr
DB	17	Kendall Smith	So
DB	20	Nick Walker	So
DB	21	Quan Martin	Fr
DB	22	Dylan Wyatt	Fr
DB	23	Ron Hardge III	Fr
DB	24	Dawson DeGroot	So
DB	25	Kerby Joseph	Fr
DB	27	Alec Andrea	Fr
DB	28	Nolan Bernat	Jr
DB	29	Christian Bobak	So
DB	30	Sydney Brown	Fr
DB	31	Cameron Watkins	Jr
DL	33	Ezekiel Holmes	Fr
DB	34	P. C. Daniel II	Fr
LB	35	Jake Hansen	So
LB	41	Jimmy Marchese	Jr
DB	42	Michael Marchese	So
LB	44	Drew Murtaugh	So
LB	45	Khalan Tolson	Fr
LB	46	Alex McEachern	Fr
LB	47	Jacob Hollins	Fr
DL	48	Julian Pearl	Fr
LB	51	Sean Coghlan	Fr
LB	52	Ayo Shogbonyo	So
LB	54	Marc Mondesir	So
DL	55	Jamal Milan	Jr
DL	90	Lere Oladipo	Fr
DL	91	Jamal Woods	So
DL	92	Isaiah Gay	So
DL	93	Calvin Avery	Fr
DL	94	Verdis Brown	Fr
DL	95	Kenyon Jackson	Jr
DL	96	Tymir Oliver	Jr
DL	97	Bobby Roundtree	So
DL	98	Deon Pate	Fr
DL	99	Owen Carney Jr.	So

Special teams

Pos.	#	Name	Class
P	14	Blake Hayes	So
K	17	James McCourt	So
K	38	Caleb Griffin	Fr
K	43	Chase McLaughlin	Sr
LS	56	Ethan Tabel	So
LS	62	Ron Gaines III	Fr

Head coach

- Lovie Smith

Coordinators/assistant coaches

- Hardy Nickerson – Defensive coordinator / linebackers
- Rod Smith – Offensive coordinator / quarterbacks
- Gill Byrd – Passing Game Coordinator / Safeties
- Bob Ligashesky – Special teams coordinator
- Luke Butkus – Offensive line
- Austin Clark – Defensive line
- Andrew Hayes-Stoker – Wide receivers
- Cory Patterson – Tight ends
- Thad Ward – Running backs
- Rob Delaney – Graduate assistant – offense
- Joe Fotu – Graduate assistant – defense
- Zach Grant – Graduate assistant – offense
- Miles Smith – Graduate assistant – defense
- Peter Collins – Defensive analyst
- Cody Gibson – Offensive analyst
- Bob McClaine – Offensive analyst
- Kingsley Osei-Asibey – Defensive analyst
- Robert Wright – Defensive analyst
- Jake Zweig – Special team analyst
- Jake Ellsworth – Defensive analyst
- Joey Boese – Head football strength and conditioning coach
- Tim Knox – Director of football operations

Legend

- (C) Team captain
- (S) Suspended
- (I) Ineligible
- Injured
- Redshirt

Roster
Last update: August 22, 2018

== Awards and honors ==
Individual Awards
Player	Award	Ref.
Chase McLaughlin	Bakken–Andersen Kicker of the Year	

All-Big Ten
Player	Position	Coaches	Media
Chase McLaughlin	K	1	2
Nick Allegretti	OG	HM	2
Reggie Corbin	RB	3	3
Blake Hayes	P	HM	3
Alex Palczewski	OT	–	HM
Del'Shawn Phillips	LB	–	HM
Bobby Roundtree	DL	–	HM
HM = Honorable mention. Reference:

== Players drafted into the NFL ==
Round	Pick	Player	Position	NFL Club
7	216	Nick Allegretti	C	Kansas City Chiefs
