= 2018 Rutgers Scarlet Knights football team =

American college football season

2018 Rutgers Scarlet Knights football
- Conference: Big Ten Conference
- East Division
- Record: 1–11 (0–9 Big Ten)
- Head coach: Chris Ash (3rd season)
- Offensive coordinator: John McNulty (1st season)
- Offensive scheme: Power spread
- Defensive coordinator: Jay Niemann (3rd season)
- Base defense: Multiple
- Home stadium: HighPoint.com Stadium

2018 Big Ten Conference football standings
| | Conf. | | | Overall |
| Team | W | | L | W | | L |
|---|---|---|---|---|---|---|
East Division
| No. 3 Ohio State xy$ | 8 | – | 1 | 13 | – | 1 |
| No. 14 Michigan x | 8 | – | 1 | 10 | – | 3 |
| No. 17 Penn State | 6 | – | 3 | 9 | – | 4 |
| Michigan State | 5 | – | 4 | 7 | – | 6 |
| Maryland | 3 | – | 6 | 5 | – | 7 |
| Indiana | 2 | – | 7 | 5 | – | 7 |
| Rutgers | 0 | – | 9 | 1 | – | 11 |
West Division
| No. 21 Northwestern xy | 8 | – | 1 | 9 | – | 5 |
| Wisconsin | 5 | – | 4 | 8 | – | 5 |
| No. 25 Iowa | 5 | – | 4 | 9 | – | 4 |
| Purdue | 5 | – | 4 | 6 | – | 7 |
| Minnesota | 3 | – | 6 | 7 | – | 6 |
| Nebraska | 3 | – | 6 | 4 | – | 8 |
| Illinois | 2 | – | 7 | 4 | – | 8 |
Championship: Ohio State 45, Northwestern 24
$ – Conference champion; x – Division champion/co-champions; y – Championship game participant; Rankings from AP Poll

The 2018 Rutgers Scarlet Knights football team represented Rutgers University during the 2018 NCAA Division I FBS football season. The Scarlet Knights played their home games at HighPoint.com Stadium in Piscataway, New Jersey and competed as members of the East Division of the Big Ten Conference. They were led by third-year head coach Chris Ash.

Rutgers began the year with a 35–7 victory over Texas State, but things quickly turned south for the team. After a blowout loss to Ohio State in Rutgers' conference opener, the team traveled to play Kansas, who had lost 39 of their previous 42 games against FBS opponents. Rutgers lost in a blowout, 55–14. The next week, the team was blown out 42–13 by Buffalo of the Mid-American Conference. In the remainder of conference play, the Scarlet Knights were mostly outmatched, losing the rest of their games, despite holding fourth quarter leads in games against Northwestern and Michigan State. Rutgers' final record of 1–11 matched the previous school record for losses in a season with their 1–11 2002 team and 0–11 1997 team.

Freshman quarterback Artur Sitowski led the team in passing, finishing with 1,158 passing yards, 4 touchdowns, and 18 interceptions. Sophomore running back Raheem Blacksheer led the team in both rushing and receiving yards, and had 953 yards from scrimmage on the year. On defense, senior linebacker Trevor Morris finished in sixth in the conference with 105 total tackles. He concluded his career in ninth on the school's all-time leaderboard for total tackles.

== Offseason ==
=== Recruits ===
The Scarlet Knights signed a total of 21 recruits.

College recruiting information (2018)
| Name | Hometown | School | Height | Weight | Commit date |
|---|---|---|---|---|---|
| Jarrett Paul; CB | Paramus, New Jersey | Paramus Catholic High School | 6 ft 1 in (1.85 m) | 197 lb (89 kg) | Apr 22, 2017 |
| Jarrett Paul; CB | Recruit ratings: Scout: Rivals: 247Sports: ESPN: | | | | |
| Jalen Chatman; QB | Harbor City, California | Narbonne High School | 6 ft 0 in (1.83 m) | 180 lb (82 kg) | May 15, 2017 |
| Jalen Chatman; QB | Recruit ratings: Scout: Rivals: 247Sports: ESPN: | | | | |
| Zihir Lacewell; WR | Staten Island, New York | Tottenville High School | 6 ft 3 in (1.91 m) | 190 lb (86 kg) | Jun 13, 2017 |
| Zihir Lacewell; WR | Recruit ratings: Scout: Rivals: 247Sports: ESPN: | | | | |
| Isiah Pacheco; RB | Vineland, New Jersey | Vineland High School | 5 ft 11 in (1.80 m) | 190 lb (86 kg) | Jun 21, 2017 |
| Isiah Pacheco; RB | Recruit ratings: Scout: Rivals: 247Sports: ESPN: | | | | |
| Kessawn Abraham; CB | Brooklyn, New York | Erasmus Hall High School | 5 ft 10 in (1.78 m) | 170 lb (77 kg) | Jun 22, 2017 |
| Kessawn Abraham; CB | Recruit ratings: Scout: Rivals: 247Sports: ESPN: | | | | |
| Matt Rosso; OT | Fairless Hills, Pennsylvania | Pennsbury High School | 6 ft 6 in (1.98 m) | 260 lb (120 kg) | Jun 24, 2017 |
| Matt Rosso; OT | Recruit ratings: Scout: Rivals: 247Sports: ESPN: | | | | |
| Deion Jennings; CB | Erial, New Jersey | Timber Creek Regional High School | 6 ft 1 in (1.85 m) | 195 lb (88 kg) | Jun 26, 2017 |
| Deion Jennings; CB | Recruit ratings: Scout: Rivals: 247Sports: ESPN: | | | | |
| Reginald Sutton; OG | Baltimore, Maryland | Calvert Hall College High School | 6 ft 4 in (1.93 m) | 278 lb (126 kg) | Jun 27, 2017 |
| Reginald Sutton; OG | Recruit ratings: Scout: Rivals: 247Sports: ESPN: | | | | |
| Avery Young; CB | Coatesville, Pennsylvania | Coatesville Area High School | 6 ft 1 in (1.85 m) | 195 lb (88 kg) | Jun 30, 2017 |
| Avery Young; CB | Recruit ratings: Scout: Rivals: 247Sports: ESPN: | | | | |
| Paul Woods; WR | Buffalo, New York | Canisius High School | 6 ft 1 in (1.85 m) | 165 lb (75 kg) | Jul 11, 2017 |
| Paul Woods; WR | Recruit ratings: Scout: Rivals: 247Sports: ESPN: | | | | |
| Adam Korsak; P | Maribyrnong, Victoria | Prokick Australia | 6 ft 1 in (1.85 m) | 190 lb (86 kg) | Jul 12, 2017 |
| Adam Korsak; P | Recruit ratings: Scout: Rivals: 247Sports: ESPN: | | | | |
| Raiqwon O'Neal; OT | Conway, South Carolina | Conway High School | 6 ft 5 in (1.96 m) | 270 lb (120 kg) | Aug 16, 2017 |
| Raiqwon O'Neal; OT | Recruit ratings: Scout: Rivals: 247Sports: ESPN: | | | | |
| Matthew Thomas; DE | Brooklyn, New York | Midwood High School | 6 ft 3 in (1.91 m) | 237 lb (108 kg) | Aug 25, 2017 |
| Matthew Thomas; DE | Recruit ratings: Scout: Rivals: 247Sports: ESPN: | | | | |
| Christian Izien; DB | Brooklyn, New York | Erasmus Hall High School | 5 ft 10 in (1.78 m) | 180 lb (82 kg) | Oct 13, 2017 |
| Christian Izien; DB | Recruit ratings: Scout: Rivals: 247Sports: ESPN: | | | | |
| Artur Sitkowski; QB | Old Bridge, New Jersey | IMG Academy | 6 ft 5 in (1.96 m) | 215 lb (98 kg) | Nov 1, 2017 |
| Artur Sitkowski; QB | Recruit ratings: Scout: Rivals: 247Sports: ESPN: | | | | |
| Jalen Jordan; WR | Philadelphia, Pennsylvania | IMG Academy | 6 ft 5 in (1.96 m) | 210 lb (95 kg) | Dec 13, 2017 |
| Jalen Jordan; WR | Recruit ratings: Scout: Rivals: 247Sports: ESPN: | | | | |
| Daevon Robinson; WR | Medford, New Jersey | Shawnee High School | 6 ft 4 in (1.93 m) | 210 lb (95 kg) | Dec 18, 2017 |
| Daevon Robinson; WR | Recruit ratings: Scout: Rivals: 247Sports: ESPN: | | | | |
| Jamree Kromah; DE | Springdale, Maryland | Charles Herbert Flowers High School | 6 ft 3 in (1.91 m) | 246 lb (112 kg) | Dec 20, 2017 |
| Jamree Kromah; DE | Recruit ratings: Scout: Rivals: 247Sports: ESPN: | | | | |
| Malik Dixon; S | Thatcher, Arizona | Eastern Arizona College | 6 ft 3 in (1.91 m) | 215 lb (98 kg) | Jan 5, 2018 |
| Malik Dixon; S | Recruit ratings: Scout: Rivals: 247Sports: ESPN: | | | | |
| Robin Jutwreten; DE | Stockholm, Sweden | N/A | 6 ft 4 in (1.93 m) | 235 lb (107 kg) | Jan 21, 2018 |
| Robin Jutwreten; DE | Recruit ratings: Scout: Rivals: 247Sports: ESPN: | | | | |
| Eddie Lewis; WR | New Monmouth, New Jersey | Mater Dei High School | 6 ft 0 in (1.83 m) | 179 lb (81 kg) | Feb 1, 2018 |
| Eddie Lewis; WR | Recruit ratings: Scout: Rivals: 247Sports: ESPN: | | | | |
Overall recruit ranking:
Note: In many cases, Scout, Rivals, 247Sports, On3, and ESPN may conflict in their listings of height and weight.; In these cases, the average was taken. ESPN grades are on a 100-point scale.; Sources: "Rivals". Rivals.; "2018 Team Ranking". Rivals.com.

=== Award watch lists ===
Listed in the order that they were released

| Award | Player | Position | Year |
|---|---|---|---|
| John Mackey Award | Jerome Washington | TE | SR |

== Schedule ==
| Date | Time | Opponent | Site | TV | Result | Attendance |
|---|---|---|---|---|---|---|
| September 1 | 12:00 p.m. | Texas State* | HighPoint.com Stadium; Piscataway, NJ | BTN | W 35–7 | 40,124 |
| September 8 | 3:30 p.m. | at No. 4 Ohio State | Ohio Stadium; Columbus, OH | BTN | L 3–52 | 93,057 |
| September 15 | 12:00 p.m. | at Kansas* | David Booth Kansas Memorial Stadium; Lawrence, KS | FSN | L 14–55 | 28,044 |
| September 22 | 12:00 p.m. | Buffalo* | HighPoint.com Stadium; Piscataway, NJ | BTN | L 13–42 | 34,574 |
| September 29 | 12:00 p.m. | Indiana | HighPoint.com Stadium; Piscataway, NJ | BTN | L 17–24 | 32,056 |
| October 6 | 12:00 p.m. | Illinois | HighPoint.com Stadium; Piscataway, NJ | BTN | L 17–38 | 36,702 |
| October 13 | 12:00 p.m. | at Maryland | Maryland Stadium; College Park, MD | BTN | L 7–34 | 32,995 |
| October 20 | 12:00 p.m. | Northwestern^{†} | HighPoint.com Stadium; Piscataway, NJ | BTN | L 15–18 | 32,514 |
| November 3 | 12:00 p.m. | at Wisconsin | Camp Randall Stadium; Madison, WI | BTN | L 17–31 | 74,379 |
| November 10 | 3:30 p.m. | No. 4 Michigan | HighPoint.com Stadium; Piscataway, NJ | BTN | L 7–42 | 43,786 |
| November 17 | 12:00 p.m. | No. 16 Penn State | HighPoint.com Stadium; Piscataway, NJ | BTN | L 7–20 | 44,840 |
| November 24 | 4:00 p.m. | at Michigan State | Spartan Stadium; East Lansing, MI | FOX | L 10–14 | 64,951 |
*Non-conference game; ^{†}Homecoming; Rankings from AP Poll released prior to the game; All times are in Eastern time

== Roster and coaching staff ==
2018 Rutgers Scarlet Knights football team roster
Players
Coaches
Offense

| Pos. | # | Name | Class |
|---|---|---|---|
| RB | 2 | Raheem Blackshear | So |
| QB | 3 | Jalen Chatman | Fr |
| RB | 4 | Trey Sneed | So |
| WR | 5 | Paul Woods | Fr |
| WR | 6 | Mohamed Jabbie | So |
| WR | 7 | Hunter Hayek | So |
| QB | 8 | Artur Sitkowski | Fr |
| RB | 10 | Isiah Pacheco | Fr |
| QB | 11 | Johnathan Lewis | So |
| WR | 12 | Jalen Jordan | Fr |
| WR | 13 | Prince Taylor | So |
| QB | 14 | Rob Nittolo | Sr |
| WR | 14 | Everett Wormley | So |
| WR | 15 | Shameen Jones | Fr |
| QB | 17 | Giovanni Rescigno (C) | Sr |
| WR | 18 | Bo Melton | So |
| QB | 19 | Austin Albericci | Fr |
| WR | 21 | Eddie Lewis | Fr |
| RB | 23 | Jonathan Hilliman | Sr |
| RB | 24 | Charles Snorweah | Jr |
| RB | 28 | Aslan Pugh | So |
| WR | 34 | Javis Hanks | Fr |
| WR | 36 | Ryan Downer | Fr |
| FB | 41 | Brandon Myers | Fr |
| RB | 44 | Max Anthony | Jr |
| OL | 50 | Owen Bowles | Fr |
| OL | 51 | Jamaal Beaty | Fr |
| OL | 54 | Kamaal Seymour | Jr |
| OL | 55 | Michael Maietti | So |
| OL | 56 | Micah Clark | So |
| OL | 57 | Zach Miseo | Fr |
| OL | 58 | Charles Zarzecki | Fr |
| OL | 61 | Mike Lonsdorf | So |
| OL | 63 | Jim Onulak | So |
| OL | 65 | Tariq Cole (C) | Sr |
| OL | 66 | Nick Krimin | So |
| OL | 70 | Reggie Sutton | Fr |
| OL | 71 | Raiqwon O'Neal | Fr |
| OL | 73 | Jonah Jackson (C) | Jr |
| OL | 74 | Sam Howson | So |
| OL | 75 | Zach Venesky | Jr |
| OL | 76 | Matt Rosso | Fr |
| OL | 77 | Sam Vretman | So |
| OL | 78 | Liam Flite | Fr |
| OL | 79 | Zack Heeman | Sr |
| WR | 81 | Tyler Hayek | Fr |
| WR | 82 | Zihir Lacewell | Fr |
| WR | 84 | Cole Murphy | Jr |
| TE | 85 | Daevon Robinson | Fr |
| TE | 86 | Nakia Griffin-Stewart | Jr |
| TE | 87 | Jonathan Pimentel | Fr |
| TE | 88 | Jerome Washington | Sr |
| TE | 89 | Travis Vokolek | So |

Defense

| Pos. | # | Name | Class |
|---|---|---|---|
| DB | 1 | Blessuan Austin | Sr |
| LB | 3 | Olakunle Fatukasi | So |
| DB | 4 | Tre Avery | So |
| LB | 5 | Trevor Morris | Sr |
| LB | 6 | Deonte Roberts (C) | Sr |
| DL | 7 | Elorm Lumor | So |
| LB | 8 | Tyshon Fogg | So |
| DB | 9 | Saquan Hampton (C) | Sr |
| DB | 11 | Isaiah Wharton (C) | Sr |
| DB | 12 | Christian Izien | Fr |
| LB | 13 | Deion Jennings | Fr |
| DB | 16 | Jelani Ray Garvin | Jr |
| DB | 17 | Zamir Mickens | Fr |
| LB | 20 | Elijah Barnwell | Fr |
| DB | 20 | Avery Young | Fr |
| DB | 21 | Tim Barrow | Fr |
| DB | 22 | Damon Hayes | Jr |
| DB | 23 | Kiy Hester | Sr |
| DB | 25 | Jarrett Paul | Fr |
| DB | 29 | Lawrence Stevens | So |
| DB | 30 | Kessawn Abraham | Fr |
| LB | 31 | Johnny Yorey | Fr |
| DB | 32 | Rani Abdulaziz | Fr |
| DB | 33 | Parker Day | Fr |
| DB | 35 | Anthony Marshall | Fr |
| LB | 42 | Izaia Bullock | Jr |
| LB | 43 | Chike Nwankwo | Fr |
| LB | 44 | Tyreek Maddox-Williams | So |
| DL | 45 | Muhammad Wainwright | Sr |
| LB | 49 | Nihym Anderson | Fr |
| DL | 50 | Julius Turner | So |
| LB | 55 | Austin Rosa | Jr |
| LB | 56 | Rashawn Battle | So |
| DL | 57 | Joahne Duggan | Fr |
| DL | 72 | Manny Taylor | Jr |
| DL | 85 | Matt Thomas | Fr |
| DL | 88 | Brendan Bordner | Fr |
| DL | 90 | Freddie Recio | So |
| DL | 91 | Tijaun Mason | Fr |
| DL | 93 | Jason Griggs | So |
| DL | 94 | Jamree Kromah | Fr |
| DL | 95 | Jon Bateky | Sr |
| DL | 96 | Willington Previlon | Jr |
| DL | 97 | Mike Tverdov | Fr |
| DL | 98 | Robin Jutwreten | Fr |
| DL | 99 | Kevin Wilkins | Sr |

Special teams

| Pos. | # | Name | Class |
|---|---|---|---|
| LS | 46 | Brendan Shank | Fr |
| LS | 47 | Billy Taylor | So |
| LS | 48 | Ryan Cassidy | Fr |
| P | 92 | Nick Johnston | Sr |
| P | 94 | Adam Korsak | So |
| K | 95 | Justin Davidovicz | So |
| P | 96 | Zach Sterr | Fr |
| K | 99 | Gavin Haggerty | Jr |

Head coach

- Chris Ash

Coordinators/assistant coaches

- John McNulty (Offensive coordinator/quarterbacks)
- Jay Niemann (Defensive coordinator/linebackers)
- Vince Okruch (Special teams coordinator/tight ends)
- Noah Joseph (Co-defensive coordinator/safeties)
- A. J. Blazek (Assistant head coach/offensive line)
- Corey Brown (Defensive line)
- Nunzio Campanile (Running backs)
- Lester Erb (Wide receivers)
- Toby Neinas (Specialists/outside linebackers)
- Cory Robinson (Cornerbacks)
- Kenny Parker (Head Strength and Conditioning)
- Anthony Van Curen (Defensive Assistant)
- Charles Watkins (Offensive assistant)
- John Weiss (Offensive assistant)
- Marquise Watson (Defensive Assistant)
- Matt Popino (Defensive Quality Control)
- Ross Douglas (Graduate assistant)

Legend

- (C) Team captain
- (S) Suspended
- (I) Ineligible
- Injured
- Redshirt

Roster
Last update: September 8, 2018

== Game summaries ==
=== Texas State ===
| | 1 | 2 | 3 | 4 | Total |
|---|---|---|---|---|---|
| Bobcats | 0 | 0 | 7 | 0 | 7 |
| Scarlet Knights | 7 | 14 | 7 | 7 | 35 |

=== At No. 4 Ohio State ===
| | 1 | 2 | 3 | 4 | Total |
|---|---|---|---|---|---|
| Scarlet Knights | 0 | 0 | 3 | 0 | 3 |
| No. 4 Buckeyes | 14 | 21 | 10 | 7 | 52 |

=== At Kansas ===
| | 1 | 2 | 3 | 4 | Total |
|---|---|---|---|---|---|
| Scarlet Knights | 7 | 7 | 0 | 0 | 14 |
| Jayhawks | 17 | 14 | 10 | 14 | 55 |

=== Buffalo ===
| | 1 | 2 | 3 | 4 | Total |
|---|---|---|---|---|---|
| Bulls | 14 | 21 | 0 | 7 | 42 |
| Scarlet Knights | 3 | 3 | 0 | 7 | 13 |

=== Indiana ===
| | 1 | 2 | 3 | 4 | Total |
|---|---|---|---|---|---|
| Hoosiers | 7 | 17 | 0 | 0 | 24 |
| Scarlet Knights | 7 | 0 | 0 | 10 | 17 |

=== Illinois ===
| | 1 | 2 | 3 | 4 | Total |
|---|---|---|---|---|---|
| Fighting Illini | 10 | 14 | 0 | 14 | 38 |
| Scarlet Knights | 7 | 7 | 0 | 3 | 17 |

=== At Maryland ===
| | 1 | 2 | 3 | 4 | Total |
|---|---|---|---|---|---|
| Scarlet Knights | 0 | 0 | 0 | 7 | 7 |
| Terrapins | 10 | 14 | 10 | 0 | 34 |

=== Northwestern ===
| | 1 | 2 | 3 | 4 | Total |
|---|---|---|---|---|---|
| Wildcats | 7 | 0 | 3 | 8 | 18 |
| Scarlet Knights | 0 | 12 | 3 | 0 | 15 |

=== At Wisconsin ===
| | 1 | 2 | 3 | 4 | Total |
|---|---|---|---|---|---|
| Scarlet Knights | 0 | 0 | 3 | 14 | 17 |
| Badgers | 7 | 3 | 14 | 7 | 31 |

=== No. 4 Michigan ===
| | 1 | 2 | 3 | 4 | Total |
|---|---|---|---|---|---|
| No. 4 Wolverines | 7 | 14 | 14 | 7 | 42 |
| Scarlet Knights | 7 | 0 | 0 | 0 | 7 |

=== No. 16 Penn State ===
| | 1 | 2 | 3 | 4 | Total |
|---|---|---|---|---|---|
| No. 16 Nittany Lions | 3 | 10 | 0 | 7 | 20 |
| Scarlet Knights | 0 | 0 | 0 | 7 | 7 |

=== At Michigan State ===
| | 1 | 2 | 3 | 4 | Total |
|---|---|---|---|---|---|
| Scarlet Knights | 7 | 0 | 0 | 3 | 10 |
| Spartans | 0 | 7 | 0 | 7 | 14 |

== Players drafted into the NFL ==
| Round | Pick | Player | Position | NFL club |
|---|---|---|---|---|
| 6 | 177 | Saquan Hampton | S | New Orleans Saints |
| 6 | 196 | Blessuan Austin | CB | New York Jets |
