= Nate Hall =

American football player (born 1996)

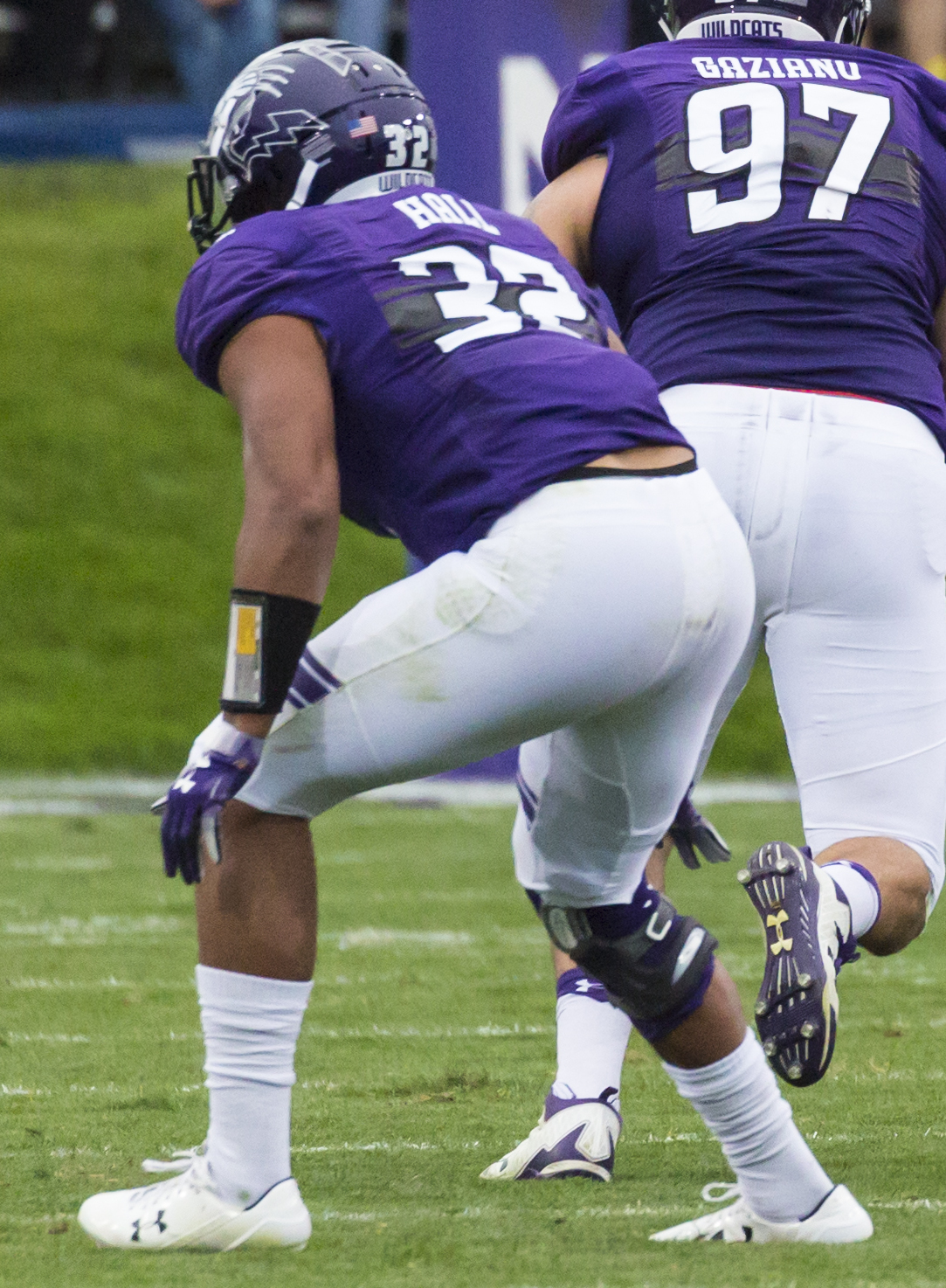
- Hall with Northwestern in 2018

No. 32, 35
- Position: Linebacker

Personal information
- Born: April 6, 1996 (age 30); Toledo, Ohio, U.S.
- Listed height: 6 ft 2 in (1.88 m)
- Listed weight: 235 lb (107 kg)

Career information
- High school: Southview (OH)
- College: Northwestern
- NFL draft: 2019: undrafted

Career history
- Dallas Cowboys (2019)*; Buffalo Bills (2019)*; Houston Texans (2019–2020); Carolina Panthers (2021)*; Los Angeles Chargers (2021)*; Arizona Cardinals (2021)*; Tennessee Titans (2022)*; Memphis Showboats (2023)
- * Offseason or practice squad member only

Career NFL statistics
- Total tackles: 11
- Sacks: 2
- Forced fumbles: 1
- Stats at Pro Football Reference

Nathan Michael Hall (born April 6, 1996) is an American former professional football player who was a linebacker in the National Football League (NFL). He played college football for the Northwestern Wildcats.

== Early life ==
Hall attended Southview High School, where he practiced football, basketball and track. In football, he was a two-way player at tight end and defensive back. As a senior, he received All-Ohio, All-Blade and All-Conference honors.

He finished his high school career with 111 tackles, three interceptions, and 16 receptions for 408 yards.

== College career ==
Hall accepted a football scholarship from Northwestern University. As a redshirt freshman, he replaced an injured Jaylen Prater and started the last 4 games at outside linebacker. He tallied 56 tackles (fifth on the team). He had 10 tackles against Penn State University.

As a sophomore, he appeared in 13 games with 8 starts at middle linebacker. He collected 73 tackles (third on the team) and 6 tackles for loss.

As a junior, he was named a full-time starter at middle linebacker, registering 79 tackles (second on the team), 16.5 tackles for loss (sixth in school history), 5 sacks, 2 interceptions and 6 pass breakups. He had 11 tackles (8 solo) and 3.5 tackles for loss against the University of Maryland. He made an interception in the Wildcats endzone to seal a 39–31 triple-overtime win against 16th-ranked Michigan State University. He tore his right ACL while practicing for the 2017 Music City Bowl.

As a senior, he started 9 games and missed 5 contests (including the 2018 Holiday Bowl) with a shoulder injury. He posted 51 tackles (5.5 for loss), 3 interceptions (tied for the team lead) and 2 pass breakups. He had 10 tackles against Purdue University.

== Professional career ==
=== Dallas Cowboys ===
Hall was signed by the Dallas Cowboys as an undrafted free agent after the 2019 NFL draft on April 30. He was waived on August 31.

=== Buffalo Bills ===
On September 1, 2019, Hall was signed to the Buffalo Bills' practice squad. He was released on September 12, but re-signed back to practice squad on September 24. He was released on October 29.

=== Houston Texans ===
On December 3, 2019, Hall was signed to the Houston Texans practice squad. He signed a reserve/future contract with the Texans on January 13, 2020.

On September 5, 2020, Hall was waived by the Texans and signed to the practice squad the next day. He was elevated to the active roster on October 10, November 7, and November 14 for the team's weeks 5, 9, and 10 games, two against the Jacksonville Jaguars, and one against the Cleveland Browns, and reverted to the practice squad after each game. He was promoted to the active roster on November 21, 2020. In Week 12 against the Detroit Lions, Hall recorded his first two career sacks on Matthew Stafford during the 41–25 win.

On August 2, 2021, Hall was waived by the Texans.

=== Carolina Panthers ===
On August 3, 2021, Hall was claimed off waivers by the Carolina Panthers. He was waived/injured on August 17 and placed on injured reserve. He was released on August 23.

=== Los Angeles Chargers ===
On October 13, 2021, Hall was signed to the Los Angeles Chargers practice squad, but was released the next day.

=== Arizona Cardinals ===
On December 7, 2021, Hall was signed to the Arizona Cardinals practice squad. He was released on January 10, 2022.

=== Tennessee Titans ===
On January 24, 2022, Hall signed a reserve/future contract with the Tennessee Titans. He was waived on May 2, 2022.

=== Memphis Showboats ===
Hall signed with the Memphis Showboats of the United States Football League on December 13, 2022. He was placed on the inactive list on May 4, 2023. He was activated on June 2, 2023. He appeared in six games with one start and had nine tackles. He was not part of the roster after the 2024 UFL dispersal draft on January 15, 2024.
