= 2018 Big Ten Football Championship Game =

2018 Discover Card Big Ten Football Championship Game
- Conference Championship
- Championship Game Logo
Northwestern Wildcats	Ohio State Buckeyes
(8–4)	(11–1)
24	45
Head coach: Pat Fitzgerald	Head coach: Urban Meyer
AP / Coaches / CFP; 21 / 21 / 21	AP / Coaches / CFP; 6 / 6 / 6
	1	2	3	4	Total
Northwestern	7	0	14	3	24
Ohio State	14	10	7	14	45
- Date: December 1, 2018
- Season: 2018
- Stadium: Lucas Oil Stadium
- Location: Indianapolis, Indiana
- MVP: Dwayne Haskins
- Favorite: Ohio State by 16.5
- National anthem: Bands of participants
- Referee: Ron Snodgrass
- Attendance: 66,375

United States TV coverage
- Network: Fox
- Announcers: Gus Johnson (play-by-play), Joel Klatt (analyst) and Jenny Taft (sideline)
- Nielsen ratings: 5.0 (8.7 million)

2018 Big Ten Conference football standings
	Conf.			Overall
Team	W		L	W		L
East Division
No. 3 Ohio State xy$	8	–	1	13	–	1
No. 14 Michigan x	8	–	1	10	–	3
No. 17 Penn State	6	–	3	9	–	4
Michigan State	5	–	4	7	–	6
Maryland	3	–	6	5	–	7
Indiana	2	–	7	5	–	7
Rutgers	0	–	9	1	–	11
West Division
No. 21 Northwestern xy	8	–	1	9	–	5
Wisconsin	5	–	4	8	–	5
No. 25 Iowa	5	–	4	9	–	4
Purdue	5	–	4	6	–	7
Minnesota	3	–	6	7	–	6
Nebraska	3	–	6	4	–	8
Illinois	2	–	7	4	–	8
Championship: Ohio State 45, Northwestern 24
$ – Conference champion; x – Division champion/co-champions; y – Championship game participant; Rankings from AP Poll

The 2018 Big Ten Football Championship Game presented by Discover was played on December 1, 2018, at Lucas Oil Stadium in Indianapolis, Indiana. The eighth annual Big Ten Football Championship Game, it determined the 2018 champion of the Big Ten Conference. Ohio State, the East Division champion, defeated West Division champion Northwestern 45–24 to win its second straight Big Ten Championship.

== History ==
The 2018 Championship Game was the eighth in the Big Ten's 123-year history and the fifth to feature the conference's East and West alignment.

== Teams ==
=== Northwestern Wildcats ===
After starting 1–3 with losses to Duke, Akron, and No. 14 Michigan, the Wildcats rebounded to win six of their next seven, including three wins over ranked teams (No. 20 Michigan State, No. 20 Wisconsin, and No. 21 Iowa); they clinched their first-ever Big Ten Championship berth with their win against Iowa. The Wildcats entered the Big Ten Championship Game with a record of 8–4, 8–1 in Big Ten play.

=== Ohio State Buckeyes ===
The Ohio State Buckeyes represented the Big Ten East Division in the game. Ohio State secured the spot with a 62–39 win over fourth-ranked Michigan. This was Ohio State's second consecutive season representing the East.

== Game summary ==
=== Scoring summary ===
Scoring summary

Quarter	Time	Drive			Team	Scoring information	Score	
Quarter	Time	Plays	Yards	TOP	Team	Scoring information	NU	OSU
1	10:31	10	77	4:29	OSU	Terry McLaurin 16-yard touchdown reception from Dwayne Haskins, Blake Haubeil kick good	0	7
1	6:27	2	80	0:51	NU	John Moten IV 77-yard touchdown run, Charlie Kuhbander kick good	7	7
1	3:29	8	65	2:58	OSU	J. K. Dobbins 2-yard touchdown run, Blake Haubeil kick good	7	14
2	6:09	8	21	3:26	OSU	42-yard field goal by Blake Haubeil	7	17
2	1:21	9	78	3:53	OSU	Terry McLaurin 42-yard touchdown reception from Dwayne Haskins, Blake Haubeil kick good	7	24
3	13:23	5	75	1:37	NU	Clayton Thorson 18-yard touchdown run, Charlie Kuhbander kick good	14	24
3	8:03	11	85	3:24	NU	Cameron Green 2-yard touchdown reception from Clayton Thorson, Charlie Kuhbander kick good	21	24
3	1:21	6	60	1:29	OSU	Chris Olave 29-yard touchdown reception from Dwayne Haskins, Blake Haubeil kick good	21	31
4	10:34	7	76	1:50	NU	21-yard field goal by Charlie Kuhbander	24	31
4	9:11	4	75	1:23	OSU	Johnnie Dixon 9-yard touchdown reception from Dwayne Haskins, Blake Haubeil kick good	24	38
4	4:09	8	54	2:32	OSU	J. K. Dobbins 17-yard touchdown reception from Dwayne Haskins, Blake Haubeil kick good	24	45
"TOP" = time of possession. For other American football terms, see Glossary of American football.							24	45

=== Statistics ===
	1	2	3	4	Total
No. 21 Wildcats	7	0	14	3	24
No. 6 Buckeyes	14	10	7	14	45

Statistics	NU	OSU
First downs	24	45
Plays–yards	68–418	87–607
Rushes–yards	24–151	46–108
Passing yards	267	499
Passing: Comp–Att–Int	27–44–2	34–41–1
Time of possession	24:08	35:52

Team	Category	Player	Statistics
Northwestern	Passing	Clayton Thorson	27–44, 267 yds., 1 TD, 2 Int.
Northwestern	Rushing	John Moten IV	76 yds., 1 TD
Northwestern	Receiving	Kyric McGowan	4 rec., 50 yds., 1 TD
Ohio State	Passing	Dwayne Haskins	34–41, 499 yds., 5 TD, 1 Int.
Ohio State	Rushing	J. K. Dobbins	68 yds., 1 TD
Ohio State	Receiving	Johnnie Dixon III	7rec., 129 yds., 1 TD

== See also ==
- List of Big Ten Conference football champions
