= 2018 Holiday Bowl =

College football bowl game

2018 San Diego County Credit Union Holiday Bowl
- 41st Holiday Bowl
Northwestern Wildcats	Utah Utes
(8–5)	(9–4)
Big Ten	Pac-12
31	20
Head coach: Pat Fitzgerald	Head coach: Kyle Whittingham
Coaches / CFP; 22 / 22	AP / Coaches / CFP; 20 / 19 / 17
	1	2	3	4	Total
Northwestern	0	3	28	0	31
Utah	14	6	0	0	20
- Date: December 31, 2018
- Season: 2018
- Stadium: SDCCU Stadium
- Location: San Diego, California
- MVP: Clayton Thorson (QB, Northwestern) & JR Pace (S, Northwestern)
- Favorite: Utah by 7
- National anthem: Haley Reinhart
- Referee: Brandon Cruse (Big XII)
- Attendance: 47,007
- Payout: US$6,326,000

United States TV coverage
- Network: FS1
- Announcers: Gus Johnson, Joel Klatt and Jenny Taft

The 2018 Holiday Bowl was a college football bowl game played on December 31, 2018. It was the 41st edition of the Holiday Bowl, and one of the 2018–19 bowl games concluding the 2018 FBS football season. This was the second season in which the Holiday Bowl was held at SDCCU Stadium. Sponsored by San Diego County Credit Union, the game was officially known as the San Diego County Credit Union Holiday Bowl.

== Teams ==
The game featured the Northwestern Wildcats, champions of the Big Ten West Division, and the Utah Utes, champions of the Pac-12 South Division. The programs had previously met twice, with Northwestern winning in 1927 and Utah winning in 1981.

=== Northwestern Wildcats ===
Northwestern was defeated in the 2018 Big Ten Football Championship Game on December 1 by Ohio State, then received and accepted a bid to the Holiday Bowl on December 2. The Wildcats entered the bowl with an 8–5 record (8–1 in conference).

=== Utah Utes ===
Utah was defeated in the 2018 Pac-12 Football Championship Game on November 30 by Washington, then received and accepted a bid to the Holiday Bowl on December 2. The Utes entered the bowl with a 9–4 record (6–3 in conference).

== Game summary ==
=== Scoring summary ===
Scoring summary

Quarter	Time	Drive			Team	Scoring information	Score	
Quarter	Time	Plays	Yards	TOP	Team	Scoring information	NU	UTAH
1	5:48	6	62	1:54	UTAH	Jaylen Dixon 27-yard touchdown reception from Jason Shelley, Matt Gay kick good	0	7
1	1:40	5	35	1:39	UTAH	Jake Jackson 4-yard touchdown reception from Jason Shelley, Matt Gay kick good	0	14
2	8:42	8	62	3:02	NU	21-yard field goal by Charlie Kuhbander	3	14
2	3:57	11	57	4:39	UTAH	32-yard field goal by Matt Gay	3	17
2	0:05	10	33	2:24	UTAH	20-yard field goal by Matt Gay	3	20
3	13:13	2	56	0:36	NU	Riley Lees 4-yard touchdown reception from Clayton Thorson, Charlie Kuhbander kick good	10	20
3	6:40				NU	Fumble recovery returned 82 yards for touchdown by Jared McGee, Charlie Kuhbander kick good	17	20
3	4:39	2	31	0:31	NU	Trey Klock 4-yard touchdown reception from Clayton Thorson, Charlie Kuhbander kick good	24	20
3	1:40	6	67	2:34	NU	Riley Lees 8-yard touchdown run, Charlie Kuhbander kick good	31	20
"TOP" = time of possession. For other American football terms, see Glossary of American football.							31	20

=== Statistics ===
	1	2	3	4	Total
No. 22 Wildcats	0	3	28	0	31
No. 17 Utes	14	6	0	0	20

Statistics	NU	UTAH
First downs	17	19
Plays–yards	70–322	77–393
Rushes–yards	40–81	32–91
Passing yards	241	302
Passing: comp–att–int	21–30–1	27–45–2
Time of possession	31:51	28:09

Team	Category	Player	Statistics
Northwestern	Passing	Clayton Thorson	21/30, 241 yds, 2 TD, 1 INT
Northwestern	Rushing	Isaiah Bowser	23 car, 70 yds
Northwestern	Receiving	Ramaud Chiaokhiao-Bowman	2 rec, 64 yds
Utah	Passing	Jason Shelley	27/45, 302 yds, 2 TD, 2 INT
Utah	Rushing	Jason Shelley	12 car, 39 yds
Utah	Receiving	Jaylen Dixon	9 rec, 114 yds, 1 TD
