= Rachad Wildgoose =

American football player (born 2000)

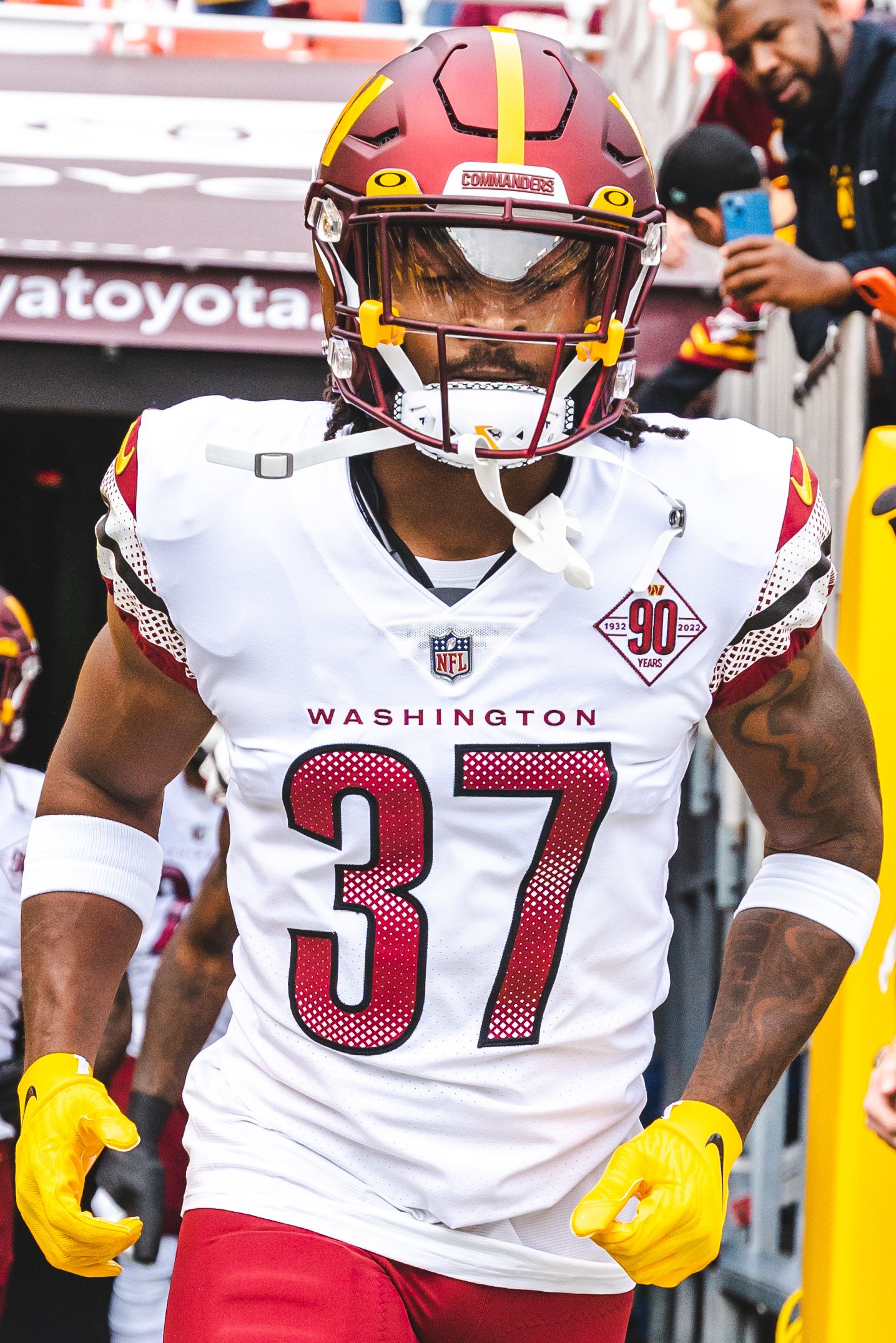
- Wildgoose with the Washington Commanders in 2022

Profile
- Position: Cornerback

Personal information
- Born: June 20, 2000 (age 26); Miami, Florida, U.S.
- Listed height: 5 ft 10 in (1.78 m)
- Listed weight: 191 lb (87 kg)

Career information
- High school: Miami Northwestern Senior
- College: Wisconsin (2018–2020)
- NFL draft: 2021: 6th round, 213th overall pick

Career history
- Buffalo Bills (2021)*; New York Jets (2021); Washington Commanders (2022); Detroit Lions (2024)*; Birmingham Stallions (2025)
- * Offseason or practice squad member only

Career NFL statistics
- Tackles: 19
- Pass deflections: 3
- Stats at Pro Football Reference

Rachad Wildgoose II (born June 20, 2000) is an American professional football cornerback. He played college football for the Wisconsin Badgers and was selected by the Buffalo Bills in the sixth round of the 2021 NFL draft. Wildgoose has also been a member of the New York Jets, Washington Commanders, and Detroit Lions of the NFL, and the Birmingham Stallions of the United Football League (UFL).

== Early life and college ==
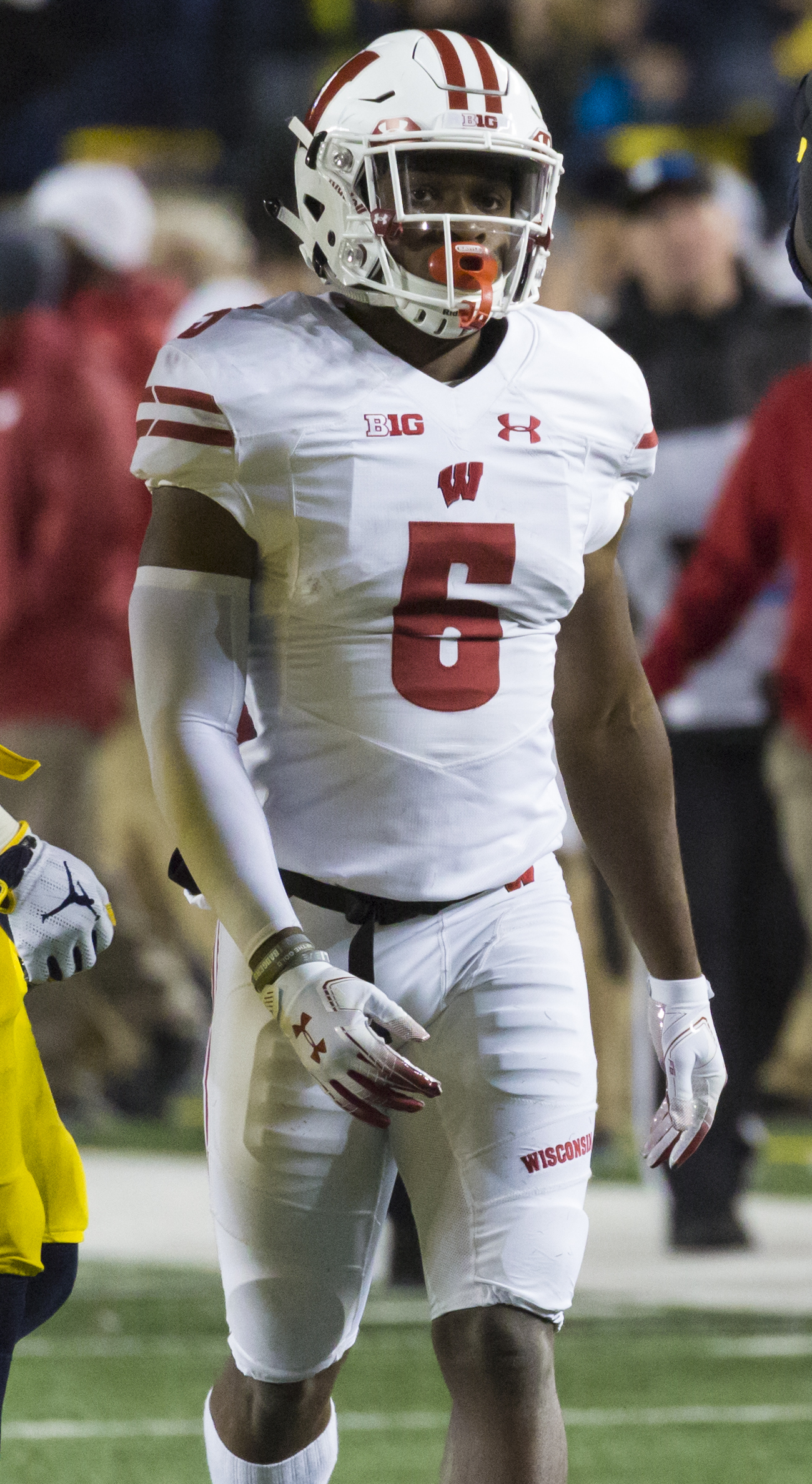
Wildgoose with Wisconsin in 2018

Wildgoose was born on June 20, 2000, in Miami, Florida, and attended Northwestern High School. In April 2017, he committed to play college football for Rutgers; but de-committed in May 2017. He committed to Georgia the following month but de-committed in 2018 after choosing to attend the University of Wisconsin–Madison to play for the Wisconsin Badgers.

Wildgoose played in 10 games with Wisconsin in 2018 and made 29 tackles. The next season he played in all 13 games and had 22 tackles. He also had an interception. His third season he played in only two games. He had a season ending injury against Northwestern which forced him to miss the rest of the season.

== Professional career ==
Pre-draft measurables
| Height | Weight | Arm length | Hand span | 40-yard dash | 10-yard split | 20-yard split | 20-yard shuttle | Three-cone drill | Vertical jump | Broad jump | Bench press |
|---|---|---|---|---|---|---|---|---|---|---|---|
| 5 ft 10 1/8 in (1.78 m) | 191 lb (87 kg) | 31 1/8 in (0.79 m) | 9 3/8 in (0.24 m) | 4.53 s | 1.50 s | 2.60 s | 4.18 s | 7.09 s | 36.0 in (0.91 m) | 10 ft 0 in (3.05 m) | 11 reps |
All values from Pro Day

=== Buffalo Bills ===
Wildgoose was selected in the sixth round (213th pick) of the 2021 NFL draft by the Buffalo Bills. On May 13, 2021, Wildgoose signed his four-year rookie contract with Buffalo. He was waived on August 31, 2021, and re-signed to the practice squad the next day.

=== New York Jets ===
On November 16, 2021, Wildgoose was signed to the New York Jets' active roster off the Bills practice squad. He played in five games in his rookie season and had three total tackles. He was released on August 30, 2022.

=== Washington Commanders ===
Wildgoose was claimed off waivers by the Washington Commanders on August 31, 2022. In the 2022 season, he appeared in 15 games, of which he started three. He had 16 total tackles and three passes defensed.

On February 28, 2023, Wildgoose signed a one-year contract extension. He was waived on August 29, 2023.

=== Detroit Lions ===
On August 21, 2024, Wildgoose signed with the Detroit Lions. He was waived by the team six days later on August 27.

=== Birmingham Stallions ===
On September 19, 2024, Wildgoose signed with the Birmingham Stallions of the United Football League (UFL). He was released on May 19, 2025.
