= Fox College Football =

Television series

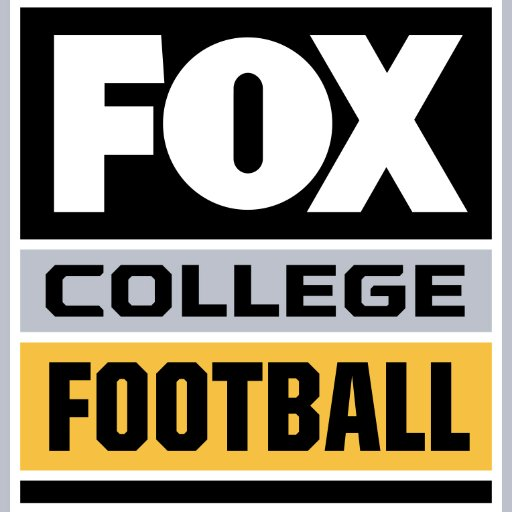
- Logo used since 2017
- Also known as: Big Noon Saturday (2019–present); Fox College Football Friday (2024–present); Fox CFB; College Football on Fox; CFB on Fox; BCS on Fox (2007–2010)
- Genre: American college football game telecasts
- Presented by: Gus Johnson; Joel Klatt; Jenny Taft; Connor Onion; Robert Griffin III; Alexa Landestoy; Tim Brando; Devin Gardner; Josh Sims; Mark Helfrich; Mike Pereira; Dean Blandino; Rob Stone; Brady Quinn; Matt Leinart; Urban Meyer; Mark Ingram II; Charles Woodson; Chris Fallica; Bruce Feldman; Mike Hill; Chris Petersen (see section)
- Narrated by: Dick Ervasti (1999–2001); John Garry (2006–present)
- Opening theme: Fox College Football theme (main theme)
- Ending theme: Same as opening
- Country of origin: United States
- Original language: English
- No. of seasons: 28 (through 2026 season)

Production
- Production locations: Various NCAA stadiums (Game telecasts, halftime show and road shows); Fox Network Center; Los Angeles, California (Studio segments, pre-game and post-game shows)
- Camera setup: Multi-camera
- Running time: 210 minutes or until game ends (inc. adverts)
- Production companies: National Collegiate Athletic Association; Fox Sports

Original release
- Network: Fox (1999–present); Fox Sports Networks (1996–2019); Fox College Sports (2006–2019); FS1 (2013–present); FS2 (2013–present); FX (2011–2012)
- Release: January 1, 1999 – present

Related
- Big Noon Saturday; Big Noon Kickoff

Fox College Football is the branding used for broadcasts of NCAA college football games produced by Fox Sports and broadcast primarily by Fox, FS1, FS2 and Fox One.

Initial college football broadcasts on the Fox network were limited to selected bowl games, beginning with the Cotton Bowl Classic from 1999 to 2014. From 2007 to 2010, Fox broadcast the Bowl Championship Series (excluding games played at the Rose Bowl stadium, whose rights were held by ABC under a separate agreement), branded as the BCS on Fox.

In 2012, Fox began to air a regular schedule of Saturday college football games during the regular season. Fox primarily airs coverage of the Big Ten and Big 12 and holds alternating rights to the Big Ten championship game. Since 2020, Fox has aired games from the Mountain West Conference (including Boise State home games prior to them joining the Pac-12 in 2026), and the Mountain West championship game). Fox also holds rights to the Holiday Bowl until the 2025 season. As of the 2024 season, coverage on the main Fox network currently consists of four regular weekly windows, including a Friday prime time game, a Saturday afternoon doubleheader (with the early game—branded as Big Noon Saturday—considered Fox's flagship game of the week), on most weeks a Saturday prime time game and on select weeks a Saturday late night game.

== Coverage history ==
=== FSN coverage and Cotton Bowl Classic (1990s) ===
In order to better compete with national networks like ESPN, starting with its inception in 1996 Fox Sports Networks (FSN) carried college football games from the then Pac-10 conference and Big 12 conference. These telecasts were distributed to individual Fox Sports Networks and other affiliates.

Fox acquired its first college football telecast in 1998, when it obtained the broadcast rights to the annual Cotton Bowl Classic held each January on (eventually, the day after) New Year's Day; the first game to be shown on the network as part of the deal was held on January 1, 1999. Fox renewed its contract to carry the game in 2010, in a four-year agreement that ran through the 2013 NCAA college football season.

Fox lost the rights to the Cotton Bowl to ESPN for the 2015 edition, as ESPN holds the television contract to all six bowl games that encompass the College Football Playoff system under a twelve-year deal worth over $7.3 billion. The Cotton Bowl was the only game among the six that was not already broadcast by ESPN.

=== Bowl Championship Series, launch of Big Ten Network (2000s) ===
From the 2006 through the 2009 seasons, Fox held the broadcast rights to most of the games comprising the Bowl Championship Series (BCS) – including the Sugar Bowl, the Fiesta Bowl, the Orange Bowl, and the newly-established BCS Championship Game. Fox paid close to $20 million per game for the rights to televise the BCS games. Fox's contract with the BCS excluded any event in the series that was held at the Rose Bowl stadium, such as the Rose Bowl Game and the 2010 BCS National Championship Game, as ABC already had a separate arrangement with the Pasadena Tournament of Roses Association to serve as the broadcaster for the games. Fox promoted the BCS bowl games with the blanket title Bowl Bash.

ESPN, which is majority owned by ABC's corporate parent The Walt Disney Company and serves as the producer for all of ABC's sports coverage, would displace Fox outright as the broadcaster of the BCS beginning in the 2010–11 season. This left Fox with only the Cotton Bowl Classic as the sole college football game, to which it held the television rights until the 2013–14 season.

In 2007, Big Ten Network debuted and began covering Big Ten football games. The network is jointly owned by Fox Sports and the Big Ten.

=== Expansion of coverage, Big Ten contract, Big Noon Saturday (2010s) ===
Beginning with the 2011 season, sister cable channel FX began airing a "game of the week" on Saturdays featuring matchups from the Big 12, Conference USA, and Pac-12. The Fox network also obtained the rights to air the Big Ten Conference's new football championship game beginning that season and running through 2016, as part of Fox Sports' partnership with the conference on the Big Ten Network. Fox also acquired bi-yearly rights to the inaugural Pac-12 Football Championship Game, alternating with ESPN/ABC.

Beginning with the 2012 season, Fox added regular season games on Saturdays to its lineup; it broadcast eight afternoon games and twelve nighttime games throughout the season, with the latter telecasts airing as part of a new strategy by the network to carry more sports programming on Saturday nights during prime time. FS1 replaced FX's coverage upon its launch in August 2013, though some overflow coverage has aired on FX occasionally when warranted; since 2017, overflow coverage has been carried FS2, and before that on Fox Business Network, which usually carries paid programming on Saturday afternoons of little consequence to pre-emption.

In 2011 FSN added a package of Conference USA football games. Many of these games were aired exclusively, aired as a simulcast, or aired on tape delay on Fox College Sports.

Pac-12 games moved from FSN to Fox, FX and eventually FS1 in 2012. The C-USA left Fox Sports entirely in 2016. FSN affiliates continued to largely hold the third-tier rights to many Big 12 teams until 2020, when ESPN+ acquired the tier 3 media rights to all but two of the conference's members (with the only holdouts being the Oklahoma Sooners, who maintained their contract with Fox Sports Oklahoma, and the Texas Longhorns, who have a long-term deal with ESPN and IMG College to operate its Longhorn Network).

After the sale of FSN to Sinclair Broadcast Group as part of Disney's acquisition of 21st Century Fox, the networks sub-licensed a package of Conference USA games from new sister network Stadium. The Atlantic Coast Conference's syndication package for regional sports networks—which was produced by Raycom Sports—continued to primarily be carried by the networks (now Bally Sports) until 2023, when Bally dropped them amid its parent company's bankruptcy, and Raycom Sports sold the rights to The CW.

Fox's coverage of the 2015 season opened with a game on FS1 featuring the Michigan Wolverines at the Utah Utes. As the first game featuring new head coach Jim Harbaugh, the season premiere was promoted with a touring "HarBus"—decorated with a sweater and khakis in imitation of Harbaugh's on-field wardrobe—travelling to Salt Lake City for the game, accompanied by a group of "HarBros" dressed like Harbaugh. The tour concluded at Salt Lake City's Grand America Hotel for game day; the bus itself was barred from entering the University of Utah's campus.

On July 12, 2016, the San Francisco 49ers announced that they had taken over the Foster Farms Bowl (now known as the Redbox Bowl), and had reached a four-year deal to move the game to Fox and Fox Deportes beginning in 2016. It was also reported by Sports Business Journal that Fox was pursuing a share of the Big Ten's primary football rights. Fox began streaming select college football games in 360-degree video for the 2016 season. The following year, FS1 also acquired rights to the Holiday Bowl, ending a long-standing relationship between the game and ESPN.

On July 24, 2017, the Big Ten Conference announced that Fox and ESPN had acquired rights to its games under a six-year deal beginning in the 2017 season. The contract also includes an extension of Fox's contract to operate Big Ten Network through 2032. The deal gives Fox the first choice of games on most weeks, including marquee games such as the Michigan/Ohio State game—which had been a fixture of ABC's college football schedule for over a half-decade. The game will remain in its traditional noon slot on the last day of the Big Ten's regular season.

Fox promoted its addition of Big Ten football with promotional campaigns focusing on each team; a Children of the Corn themed commercial focusing on the Nebraska Cornhuskers was pulled after complaints by the school.

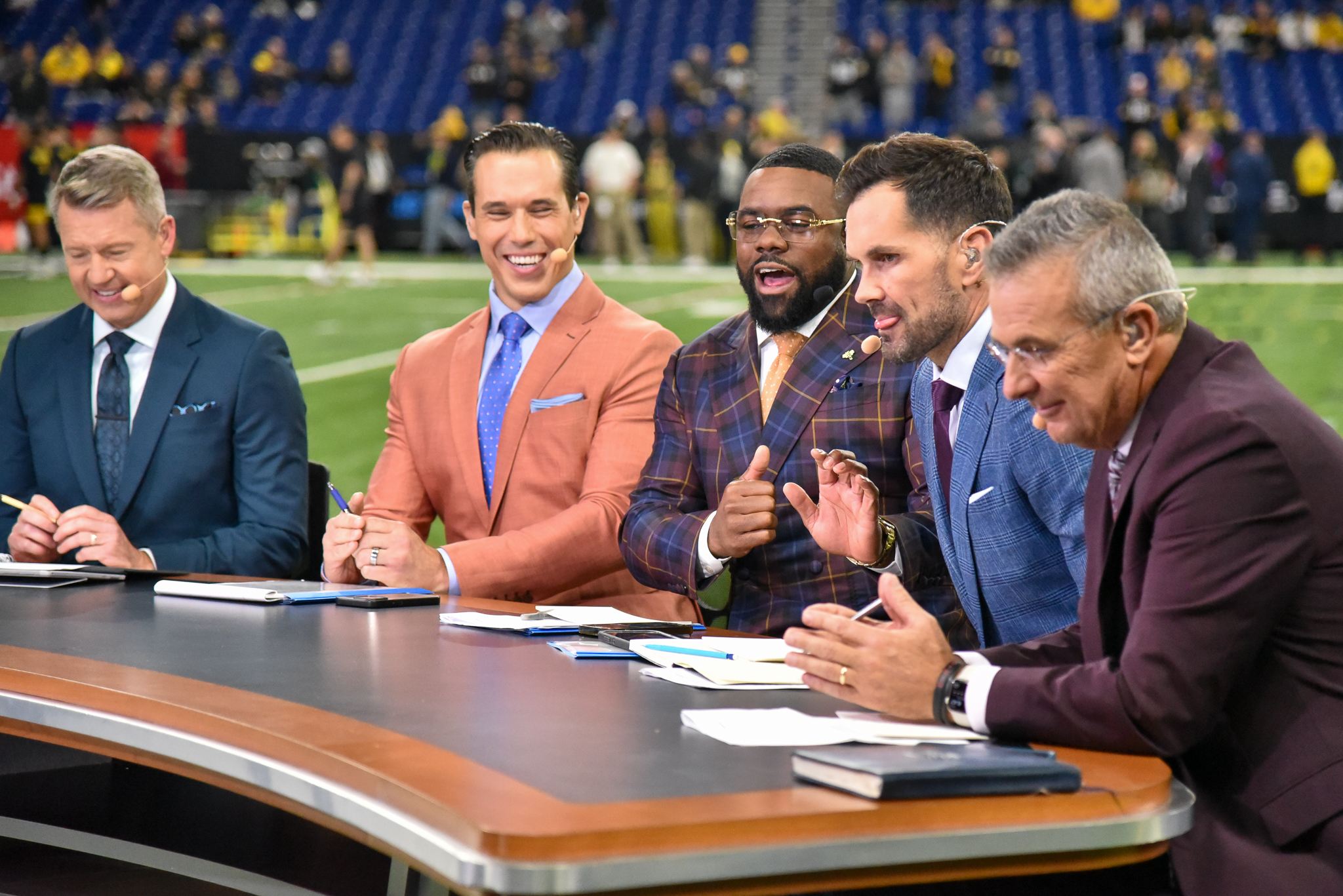
Brady Quinn, Mark Ingram, Matt Leinart, and Urban Meyer at the 2023 Big Ten Football Championship Game

Prior to the 2019 season, Fox lost its rights to future Big 12 championship games to ESPN as part of an expansion of its rights to the conference. Fox declined to bid on the 2019, 2021, and 2023 games.

In the 2019 season, Fox introduced a new flagship Noon ET window known as Big Noon Saturday. The games are accompanied by a pre-game show, Big Noon Kickoff. A Fox executive stated that the network's highest-rated games were often those with a Noon kickoff, and that the network also wanted to avoid competition from other highly viewed windows such as the SEC on CBS and ABC's Saturday Night Football. The new emphasis on early games proved successful: in the first weeks of the 2019 season, Fox had the highest-rated game in the timeslot on multiple occasions. This pattern continued into subsequent seasons, with Big Noon Saturday overtaking the SEC on CBS as having the highest average viewership in the 2021 season, and the Michigan/Ohio State game (which saw Michigan end an eight-game losing streak in the rivalry) being the highest-rated regular-season game of the 2021 season, and most-watched regular-season game since the Alabama–LSU game in 2019.

Due to the early kickoff times, the package has faced criticism for having undue impacts on teams not based in the Eastern Time Zone (ET), including from University of Oklahoma Athletics Director Joe Castiglione (who felt that a Noon ET kickoff for a 2021 game against Nebraska, marking the 50th anniversary of their 1971 "Game of the Century", would diminish its profile), and Stanford head coach David Shaw (who, in particular, criticized Fox Sports for scheduling noon kickoffs involving visiting Pac-12 teams). In August 2021, University of Oklahoma president Joe Harroz cited criticism of Big Noon Saturday when discussing the Sooners' proposed move to the SEC, arguing that the Big 12 conference would be "last in line" in negotiating new media deals, and that "our fans talk about that. It also matters to student-athletes. When those who go before you, in terms of negotiations for 2025 and beyond, if those premiere slots are already taken up, it impacts things in a material way. It translates into disadvantages in recruiting the top talent, disadvantages for our student-athletes and a detriment to the fan experience."

=== Mountain West, Big Ten and Big 12 renewal, Friday night games (2020s) ===
On January 9, 2020, the Mountain West Conference announced that its next top-tier basketball and football contracts would be split between CBS Sports and Fox Sports under a six-year deal, with Fox replacing ESPN. Fox holds rights to 23 games per-season, including the conference championship and all Boise State home games (since 2012, as part of concessions to remain in the conference, the Mountain West has allowed Boise State's home games to be sold as a separate package from the remainder of its media rights). CBS Sports Network will remain the main broadcaster for the conference outside of these games.

In the 2022 season, ESPN sub-licensed one additional Big Ten football game to Fox, as compensation to release Joe Buck from his contract with the network to join ESPN and Monday Night Football.

In August 2022, Fox renewed its rights to the Big Ten under a seven-year deal beginning in the 2023 season. Under the new contract, Fox, CBS, and NBC will hold rights to Noon, 3:30 p.m. ET, and prime time games respectively. There will be a larger number of games on the Fox broadcast network, and an option to air "premier" Big Ten games in other timeslots after Oregon, USC, UCLA, and Washington move to the conference in 2024. Fox will air four Big Ten championship games in odd-numbered years over the length of the contract. In October 2022, Fox also renewed its rights to the Big 12 with a six-year extension through 2030–31.

As part of the agreements, Fox also gained additional access to place microphones on players and coaches in Big Ten and Big 12 games beginning in the 2023 season. After having previously shared its in-game presentation with the NFL on Fox, Fox College Football also adopted a dedicated graphics package for its broadcasts (using boxier graphics and a sticker motif, designed to be "punchier" than the previous NFL graphics), although the revamp faced criticism from viewers on social media.

For the 2024 season, with the departure of WWE SmackDown to USA Network, Fox introduced a second weekly primetime game known as Fox College Football Friday, beginning September 13; the package draws primarily from the Big Ten and Big 12. One game between Rutgers at USC on October 25 was scheduled after Fox's coverage of Game 1 of the 2024 World Series, with an 11 p.m. ET (8:00 p.m. PT) kickoff; the start of the game was preempted to FS1 due to Game 1 going to extra innings. Ohio State and Michigan's spring games also aired on Fox, marking the first time a spring game had aired on over-the-air television.

In May 2024, it was announced that Fox had acquired two Pac-12 football home games involving the conference's remaining members, Oregon State University and Washington State University. Both games aired on Fox. CW Sports, the sports division of The CW, acquired the rest of the games.

Beginning with the 2026 season Fox and FS1 introduced a new graphics package.

== Nielsen ratings ==
=== Regular season ===
Rank	Date	Matchup				Network	Viewers (millions)	TV Rating	Significance
1	November 25, 2023, 12:00 ET	#2 Ohio State	24	#3 Michigan	30	Fox	19.07	9.0	The Game
2	November 26, 2022, 12:00 ET	#3 Michigan	45	#2 Ohio State	23	Fox	17.14	8.1	The Game
3	August 30, 2025, 12:00 ET	#1 Texas	7	#3 Ohio State	14	Fox	16.62	TBA	
4	November 27, 2021, 12:00 ET	#2 Ohio State	27	#5 Michigan	42	Fox	15.89	8.1	The Game
5	November 24, 2018, 12:00 ET	#4 Michigan	39	#10 Ohio State	62	Fox	13.20	7.5	The Game
6	November 30, 2019, 12:00 ET	#1 Ohio State	56	#13 Michigan	27	Fox	12.42	7.5	The Game
7	November 30, 2024, 12:00 ET	Michigan	13	#2 Ohio State	10	Fox	12.32	TBA	The Game
8	September 10, 2022, 12:00 ET	#1 Alabama	20	Texas	19	Fox	10.60	5.7	
9	November 25, 2017, 12:00 ET	#9 Ohio State	31	Michigan	20	Fox	10.51	6.1	The Game
10	October 21, 2023, 12:00 ET	#7 Penn State	12	#3 Ohio State	20	Fox	9.96	5.3	Rivalry

=== Conference championships ===
Year	Conference	Matchup				Viewers (millions)	TV Ratings
2011	Big Ten	#15 Wisconsin	42	#11 Michigan State	39	7.8	4.6
2011	Pac-12	UCLA	31	#8 Oregon	49	4.5	2.9
2012	Big Ten	Wisconsin	70	#14 Nebraska	31	4.9	3.0
2012	Pac-12	#17 UCLA	24	#8 Stanford	27	4.9	3.0
2013	Big Ten	#10 Michigan State	34	#2 Ohio State	24	13.9	7.9
2014	Big Ten	#13 Wisconsin	0	#5 Ohio State	59	6.1	3.5
2014	Pac-12	#7 Arizona	13	#2 Oregon	51	6.0	3.7
2015	Big Ten	#5 Michigan State	16	#4 Iowa	13	9.8	5.7
2016	Big Ten	#7 Penn State	38	#6 Wisconsin	31	9.2	5.2
2016	Pac-12	#8 Colorado	10	#4 Washington	41	5.7	3.4
2017	Big Ten	#8 Ohio State	27	#4 Wisconsin	21	12.9	7.3
2017	Big 12	#11 TCU	17	#3 Oklahoma	41	5.9	3.8
2018	Big Ten	#21 Northwestern	24	#6 Ohio State	45	8.7	5.0
2018	Pac-12	#17 Utah	3	#11 Washington	10	5.1	2.6
2019	Big Ten	#1 Ohio State	34	#8 Wisconsin	21	13.6	7.6
2020	Big Ten	#14 Northwestern	10	#4 Ohio State	22	8.0	4.6
2020	Pac-12	Oregon	31	#13 USC	24	3.9	2.2
2020	Mountain West	Boise State	20	#24 San Jose State	34	1.4	0.9
2021	Big Ten	#2 Michigan	42	#13 Iowa	3	11.7	6.2
2021	Mountain West	Utah State	46	#19 San Diego State	13	0.8	0.5
2022	Big Ten	Purdue	22	#2 Michigan	43	10.7	5.5
2022	Pac-12	#11 Utah	47	#4 USC	24	6.0	3.3
2022	Mountain West	Fresno State	28	Boise State	16	1.9	1.0
2023	Big Ten	#2 Michigan	26	#16 Iowa	0	10.02	5.1
2023	Mountain West	Boise State	44	UNLV	20	1.26	0.7
2024	Mountain West	#20 UNLV	7	#10 Boise State	21	3.01	TBA

=== Bowl Viewership ===
Holiday Bowl

- 2017 Holiday Bowl (FS1): 1.6M
- 2018 Holiday Bowl (FS1): 1.8M
- 2019 Holiday Bowl (FS1): 2.5M
- 2020 Holiday Bowl (FS1): Cancelled due to the COVID-19 pandemic
- 2021 Holiday Bowl (Fox): Cancelled due to the COVID-19 pandemic
- 2022 Holiday Bowl (Fox): 4.0M
- 2023 Holiday Bowl (Fox): 3.5M
- 2024 Holiday Bowl (Fox): 2.9M

Redbox Bowl/Foster Farms Bowl

- 2016 Foster Farms Bowl (Fox) 2.6M
- 2017 Foster Farms Bowl (Fox) 2.8M
- 2018 Redbox Bowl (Fox): 3.7M
- 2019 Redbox Bowl (Fox): 1.9M
- 2020 Redbox Bowl (Fox): Cancelled due to the COVID-19 pandemic

Cotton Bowl Classic

- 1999 Cotton Bowl Classic (Fox): n/a
- 2000 Cotton Bowl Classic (Fox): n/a
- 2001 Cotton Bowl Classic (Fox): n/a
- 2002 Cotton Bowl Classic (Fox): n/a
- 2003 Cotton Bowl Classic (Fox): n/a
- 2004 Cotton Bowl Classic (Fox): n/a
- 2005 Cotton Bowl Classic (Fox): 4.0M
- 2006 Cotton Bowl Classic (Fox): n/a
- 2007 Cotton Bowl Classic (Fox): n/a
- 2008 Cotton Bowl Classic (Fox): n/a
- 2009 Cotton Bowl Classic (Fox): 6.4M
- 2010 Cotton Bowl Classic (Fox): 7.3M
- 2011 Cotton Bowl Classic (Fox): 10.0M
- 2012 Cotton Bowl Classic (Fox): 8.4M
- 2013 Cotton Bowl Classic (Fox): 11.9M
- 2014 Cotton Bowl Classic (Fox): n/a

Orange Bowl

- 2007 Orange Bowl (Fox): 10.6M
- 2008 Orange Bowl (Fox): 12.0M
- 2009 Orange Bowl (Fox): 9.3M
- 2010 Orange Bowl (Fox): 10.9M

Sugar Bowl

- 2007 Sugar Bowl (Fox): 14.4M
- 2008 Sugar Bowl (Fox): 11.7M
- 2009 Sugar Bowl (Fox): 13.4M
- 2010 Sugar Bowl (Fox): 15.5M

Fiesta Bowl

- 2007 Fiesta Bowl (Fox): 13.8M
- 2008 Fiesta Bowl (Fox): 12.2M
- 2009 Fiesta Bowl (Fox): 17.1M
- 2010 Fiesta Bowl (Fox): 13.8M

BCS National Championship Game

- 2007 BCS National Championship Game (Fox): 28.8M
- 2008 BCS National Championship Game (Fox): 23.1M
- 2009 BCS National Championship Game (Fox): 26.8M

== Personalities ==
On-air staffing of Big Noon Saturday
Team	Play-by-play	Color commentator	Sidelines
Lead	Gus Johnson	Joel Klatt	Jenny Taft
Secondary	Connor Onion	Robert Griffin III	Alexa Landestoy
Tertiary	Tim Brando	Devin Gardner	Josh Sims
Quaternary	Jack Kizer	Mark Helfrich	

=== Announcer pairings ===
1. Gus Johnson/Joel Klatt/Jenny Taft/Tom Rinaldi (Fox Big Noon Saturday)
2. Connor Onion/Robert Griffin III/Alexa Landestoy (Fox/FS1)
3. Tim Brando or Noah Reed/Devin Gardner/Josh Sims (Fox/FS1)
4. Jack Kizer/Mark Helfrich (Fox/FS1)
5. Dan Hellie or Noah Reed or Chris Myers/Robert Smith (FS1)
6. Eric Collins/Spencer Tillman (FS1)
7. Carlo Jiménez or Noah Reed/Petros Papadakis (FS1)
8. Evan Lepler/Tanner Morgan (FS1)
9. Trent Rush/Sherdrick Bonner (FS1)

=== Big Noon Kickoff ===
Hosts

- Rob Stone (on site)
- Mike Hill (studio)

Analysts

- Matt Leinart (on site)
- Mark Ingram II (on site)
- Brady Quinn (on site)
- Urban Meyer (on site)
- Chris Petersen (studio)

NCAA Insider

- Bruce Feldman

Contributors

- Clay Travis
- Charles Woodson

Reporter

- Tom Rinaldi (on site)

== See also ==
- College football on television
- Bowl Championship Series on television and radio
