= Clayton Thorson =

American football player (born 1995)

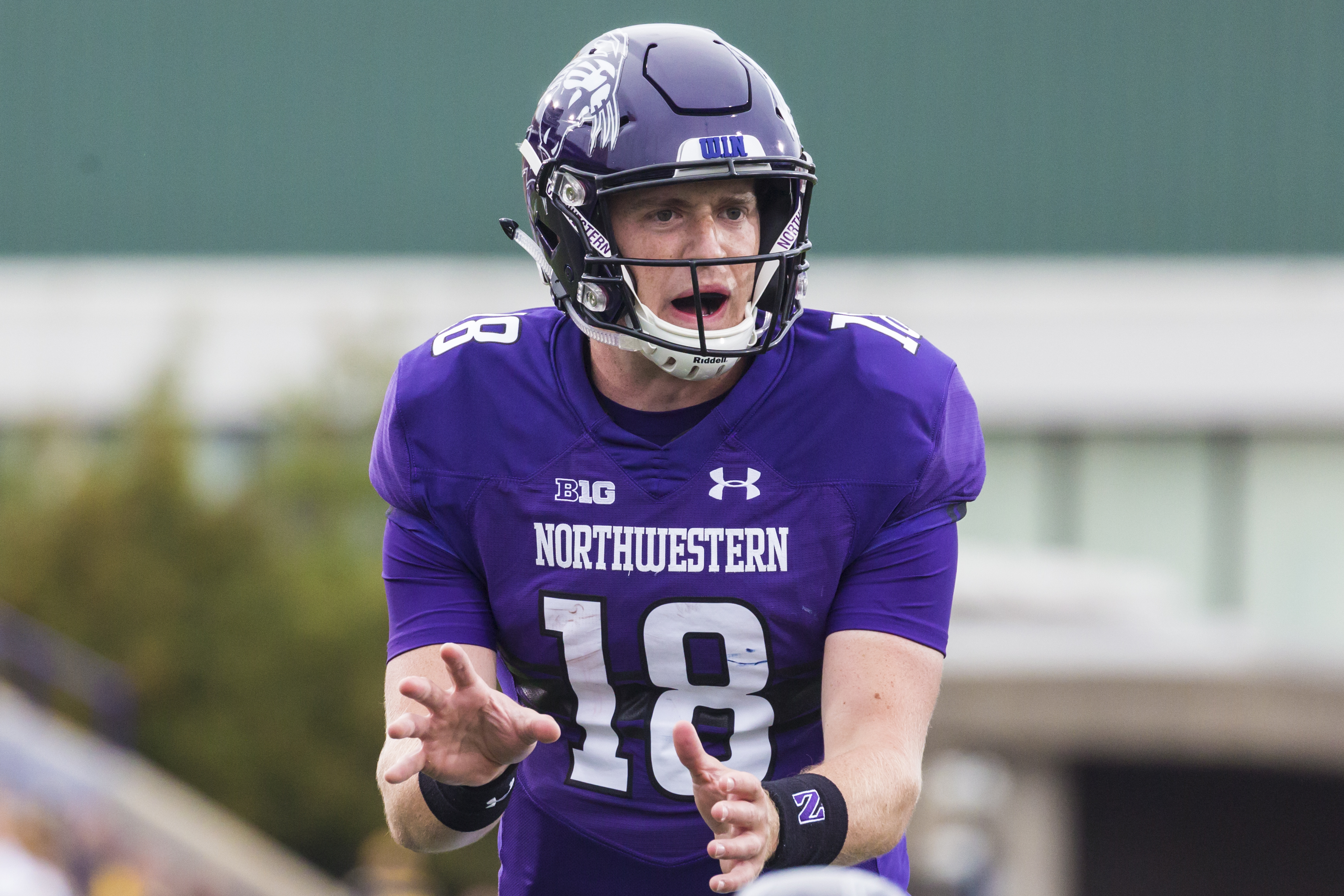
- Thorson with the Northwestern Wildcats in 2018

No. 8, 18
- Position: Quarterback

Personal information
- Born: June 15, 1995 (age 31); Wheaton, Illinois, U.S.
- Listed height: 6 ft 4 in (1.93 m)
- Listed weight: 222 lb (101 kg)

Career information
- High school: Wheaton North
- College: Northwestern (2014–2018)
- NFL draft: 2019: 5th round, 167th overall pick

Career history
- Philadelphia Eagles (2019)*; Dallas Cowboys (2019–2020)*; New York Giants (2020–2021); Houston Gamblers (2022)
- * Offseason or practice squad member only

Awards and highlights
- Third-team All-Big Ten (2017)

Career USFL statistics
- Passing attempts: 149
- Passing completions: 85
- Completion percentage: 57.0
- TD–INT: 10–7
- Passing yards: 987
- QBR: 80.0
- Stats at Pro Football Reference

Clayton James Thorson (born June 15, 1995) is an American former football quarterback who played college football for the Northwestern Wildcats. He was selected by the Philadelphia Eagles of the National Football League (NFL) in the fifth round of the 2019 NFL draft.

== Early life ==
Thorson attended Wheaton North High School in Wheaton, Illinois. As a senior, he had 2,809 passing yards, 29 passing touchdowns, 630 rushing yards and 12 rushing touchdowns. He received all-area, all-conference and all-state honors.

In the playoffs against Fenwick High School, he guided his team to a 32–31 win, after coming back from a 6–31 second-quarter deficit, by tallying 413 passing yards and 5 touchdowns. He led his team to back-to-back state quarterfinals in his last two years. He was named MVP in Semper Fidelis All-American Bowl.

== College career ==
Thorson accepted a football scholarship from Northwestern University. As a redshirt freshman in 2015, he took over the starting quarterback job that was left open after Trevor Siemian graduated. He completed 150 of 295 passes for 1,522 passing yards, 7 touchdowns, 9 interceptions, 397 rushing yards and 5 touchdowns. He became the first quarterback in school history to have 10 wins as a freshman and in his first season as a starter.

As a sophomore in 2016, the team lost its first two games against Western Michigan University and Illinois State University. He completed 280-of-478 passes for 3,182 yards (school record for sophomores), 22 passing touchdowns (school record), 5 rushing touchdowns (second on the team) and 5 interceptions. He had career-high 352 passing yards and 3 passing touchdowns in a 45–17 win against Purdue University.

As a junior in 2017, he posted 2,844 passing yards, 15 touchdowns, 8 rushing touchdowns (second on the team) and 12 interceptions. He tore his right ACL in the 2017 Music City Bowl against the University of Kentucky, while making a reception on a trick play.

As a senior in 2018, he was limited by his torn right ACL last season, coming back with less than 8 months of recovery. On November 10, Thorson led the Cats to a 14–10 victory over the No. 21 ranked University of Iowa, earning Northwestern the 2018 Big Ten Conference West title. He finished with 3,183 passing yards, 17 passing touchdowns, 15 interceptions and 9 rushing touchdowns, leading the team in the latter statistic.

His 53 consecutive starts at quarterback is the most ever in the Big Ten and tied for the most with Colt McCoy in all of the Power Five conferences, and over those 4 years Clayton set several Northwestern career records including wins (35), passing yards (10,731), completions (991) and passing touchdowns (61). He is the only quarterback in Big Ten history to pass for 10,000 yards and rush for 20 touchdowns in his career.

=== College statistics ===
Year	Team	Games			Passing									Rushing				
Year	Team	GP	GS	Record	Cmp	Att	Pct	Yds	Avg	Lng	TD	Int	Rtg	Att	Yds	Avg	Lng	TD
2014	Northwestern	0	0	—	Redshirt													
2015	Northwestern	13	13	10–3	150	295	50.8	1,522	5.2	66	7	9	95.9	100	397	4.0	68	5
2016	Northwestern	13	13	7–6	280	478	58.6	3,182	6.7	58	22	9	125.9	97	98	1.0	42	5
2017	Northwestern	13	13	10–3	262	434	60.4	2,844	6.6	58	15	12	121.3	87	23	0.3	21	8
2018	Northwestern	14	14	9–5	299	489	61.1	3,183	6.5	62	17	15	121.2	78	−110	−1.4	23	9
Career		53	53	36–17	991	1,696	58.4	10,731	6.3	66	61	45	118.1	362	408	1.1	68	27

== Professional career ==
Pre-draft measurables
Height	Weight	Arm length	Hand span	Wonderlic
6 ft 4 in (1.93 m)	222 lb (101 kg)	31 1/8 in (0.79 m)	9 3/4 in (0.25 m)	32
All values from NFL Combine

=== Philadelphia Eagles ===
Thorson was selected by the Philadelphia Eagles in the fifth round (167th overall) of the 2019 NFL draft. He was waived during final roster cuts on August 31, 2019.

=== Dallas Cowboys ===
On September 1, 2019, Thorson was signed to the practice squad of the Dallas Cowboys. He signed a reserve/future contract with the Cowboys on December 31.

On September 2, 2020, Thorson was waived by the Cowboys.

=== New York Giants ===
On September 29, 2020, Thorson was signed to the New York Giants' practice squad. The signing reunited him with offensive coordinator Jason Garrett, who was his head coach with the Cowboys. He was elevated to the active roster on December 5 and 19 for the team's weeks 13 and 15 games against the Seattle Seahawks and Cleveland Browns, and reverted to the practice squad after each game. He signed a reserve/future contract on January 4, 2021.

On August 16, 2021, Thorson was waived/injured by the Giants and placed on injured reserve. He was released on August 25. On December 7, Thorson signed to the Giants practice squad and was released on December 14. On January 8, 2022, Thorson was signed back to the practice squad. His contract expired when the team's season ended on January 9.

=== Houston Gamblers ===
On February 22, 2022, Thorson was selected by the Houston Gamblers of the United States Football League (USFL) in the 2022 USFL draft. He was named the team's starting quarterback, even though he showed inconsistent play in the first two contests, while throwing 4 interceptions. On June 2, he was transferred to the inactive/injured reserve roster with an elbow injury. He started in the first seven games of the season, completing 57% of his passes for 987 yards, 10 passing touchdowns, 71 rushing yards, one rushing touchdown and 7 interceptions. At the time of his injury, he was the league's leader in passing touchdowns. He was replaced with Kenji Bahar. On January 5, 2023, Thorson was released by the Gamblers.

=== Professional statistics ===
USFL statistics
Year	Team	Games		Passing								Rushing			
Year	Team	GP	GS	Cmp	Att	Pct	Yds	Y/A	TD	Int	Rtg	Att	Yds	Avg	TD
2022	HOU	7	7	85	149	57.0	987	6.6	10	7	80.0	14	66	4.7	1

== Personal life ==
Thorson and his wife, Audrey, have been married since June 2018.
