= List of Michigan Wolverines starting quarterbacks =

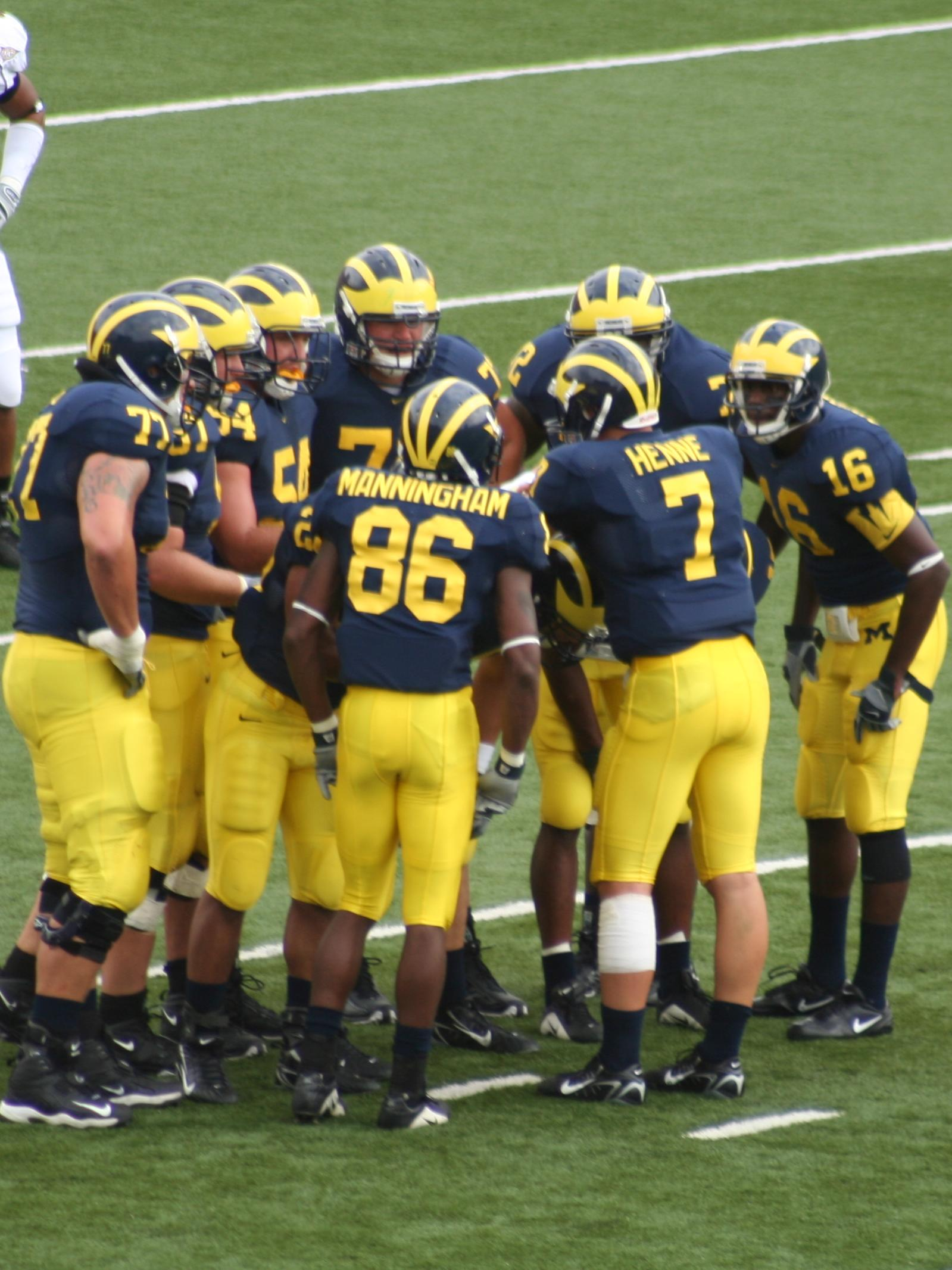
Chad Henne, Michigan Wolverines quarterback, pictured as the school's all-time leader in career passing completions, attempts, yards, and touchdowns.

This is an incomplete list of starting quarterbacks for the Michigan Wolverines football team of the NCAA Division I Football Bowl Subdivision. The list includes quarterbacks who started at least one regular-season game, listed in chronological order by season beginning in 1993.

== Starters per season ==
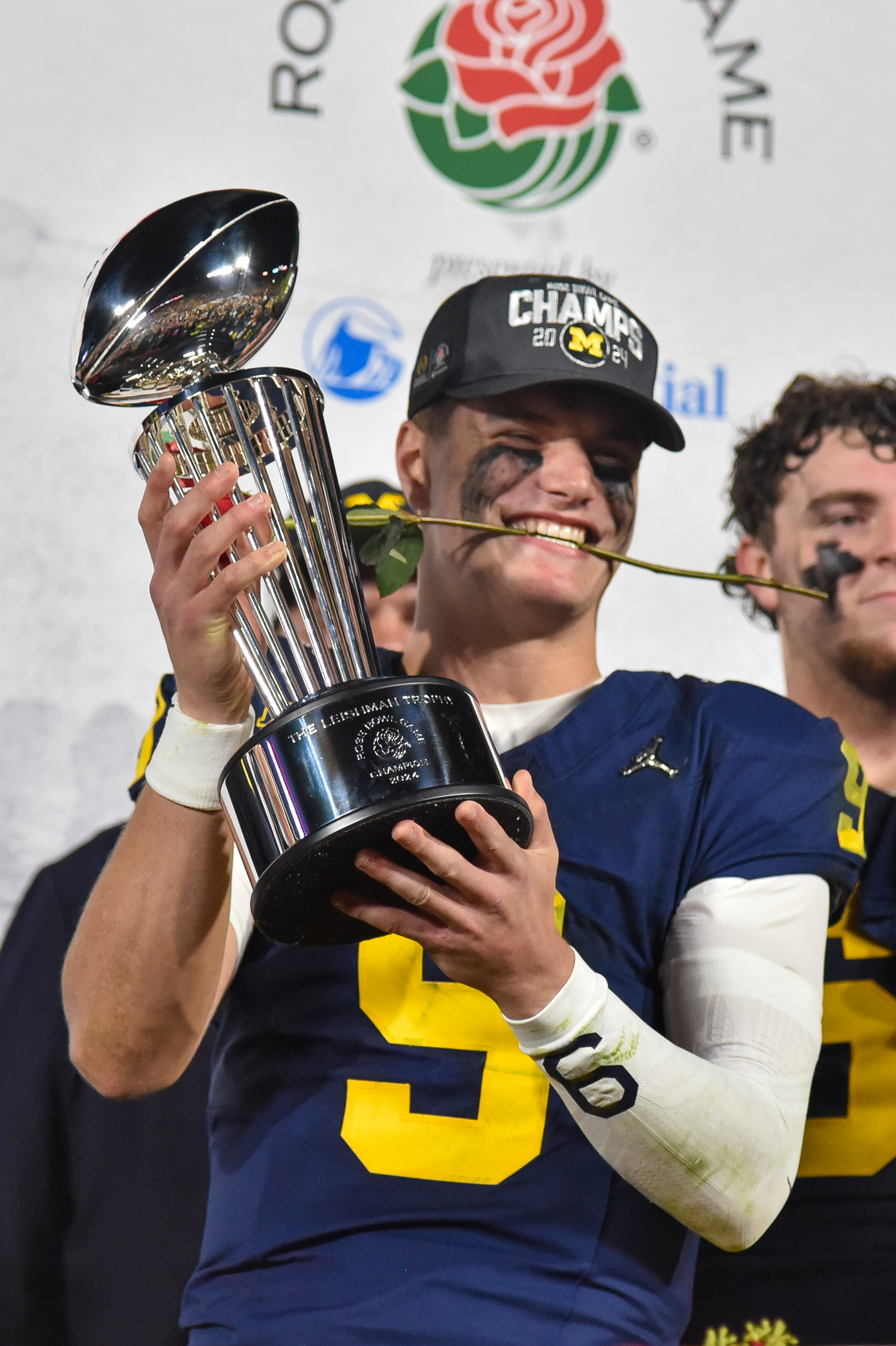
J. J. McCarthy, Michigan Wolverines quarterback (2021–2023), 27–1 as a starter and 2024 CFP National Champion.

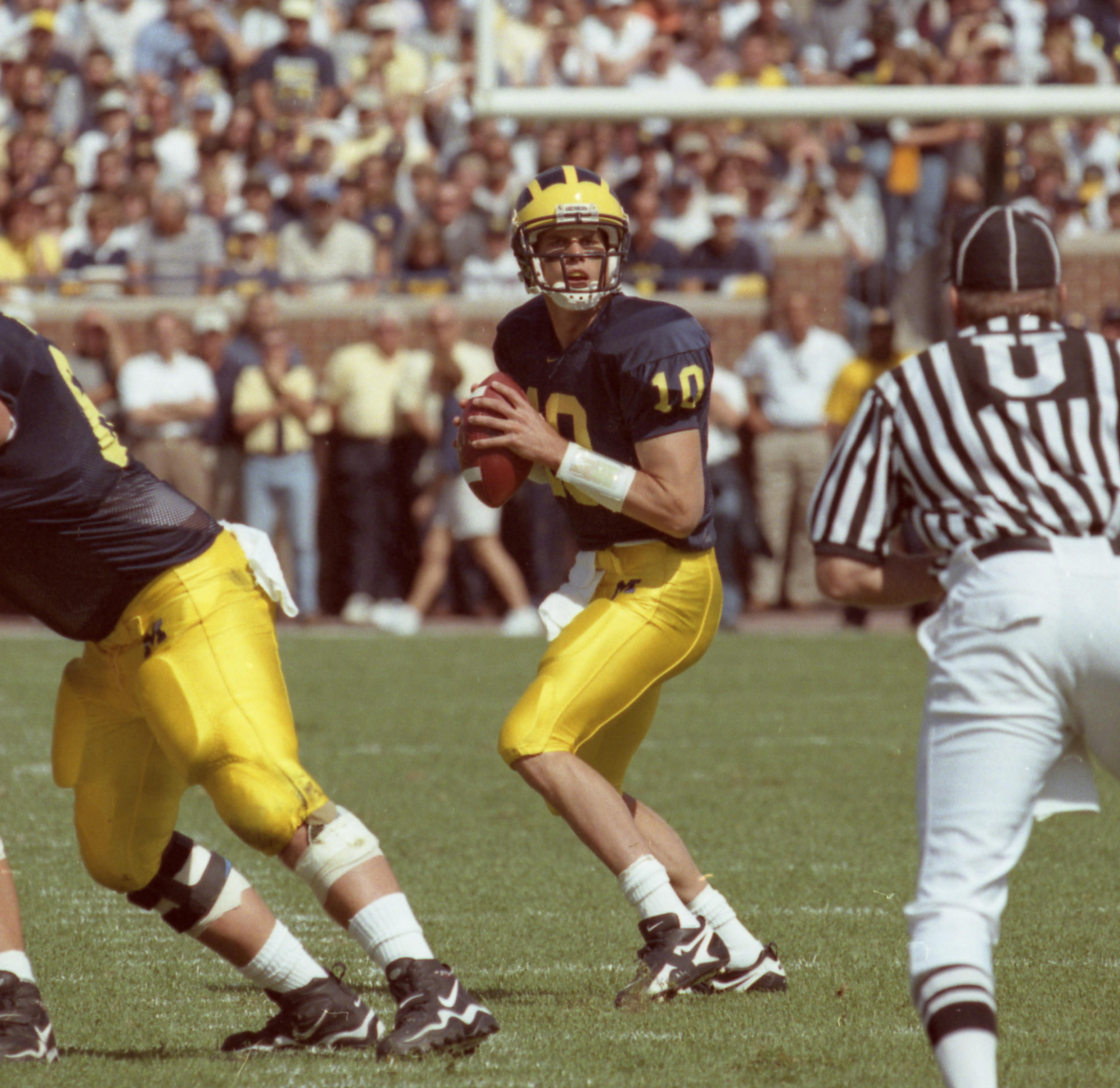
Tom Brady, Michigan Wolverines quarterback (1995–1999), 20–5 as a starter.

The number of games they started during the season is listed to the right of their name:

| Season | Starting quarterback(s) | References |
|---|---|---|
| 2025 | Bryce Underwood (13) | |
| 2024 | Davis Warren (9) / Alex Orji (3) / Jack Tuttle (1) | |
| 2023 | J. J. McCarthy (15) | |
| 2022 | J. J. McCarthy (13) / Cade McNamara (1) | |
| 2021 | Cade McNamara (14) | |
| 2020 | Joe Milton (5) / Cade McNamara (1) | |
| 2019 | Shea Patterson (13) | |
| 2018 | Shea Patterson (13) | |
| 2017 | John O'Korn (5) / Brandon Peters (4) / Wilton Speight (4) | |
| 2016 | Wilton Speight (12) / John O'Korn (1) | |
| 2015 | Jake Rudock (13) | |
| 2014 | Devin Gardner (11) / Shane Morris (1) | |
| 2013 | Devin Gardner (12) / Shane Morris (1) | |
| 2012 | Denard Robinson (9) / Devin Gardner (4) | |
| 2011 | Denard Robinson (13) | |
| 2010 | Denard Robinson (13) | |
| 2009 | Tate Forcier (12) | |
| 2008 | Steven Threet (8) / Nick Sheridan (4) | |
| 2007 | Chad Henne (10) / Ryan Mallett (3) | |
| 2006 | Chad Henne (13) | |
| 2005 | Chad Henne (12) | |
| 2004 | Chad Henne (12) | |
| 2003 | John Navarre (13) | |
| 2002 | John Navarre (13) | |
| 2001 | John Navarre (12) | |
| 2000 | Drew Henson (8) / John Navarre (4) | |
| 1999 | Tom Brady (12) | |
| 1998 | Tom Brady (13) | |
| 1997 | Brian Griese (12) | |
| 1996 | Scott Dreisbach (11) / Brian Griese (1) | |
| 1995 | Brian Griese (9) / Scott Dreisbach (5) | |
| 1994 | Todd Collins (12) | |
| 1993 | Todd Collins (12) | |

== Team passer rankings ==
Michigan Wolverines quarterbacks ranked by career starts since 1993. Pre-2002 bowl game stats are excluded. Starts and wins are included; passing statistics are not.

| Name | GS | W–L–T | Comp | Att | Pct | Yards | TD | Int |
|---|---|---|---|---|---|---|---|---|
| Chad Henne | 47 | 34–13 | 828 | 1,387 | 59.7 | 9,715 | 87 | 37 |
| John Navarre | 42 | 31–11 | 744 | 1,327 | 56.1 | 9,014 | 70 | 30 |
| Denard Robinson | 35 | 23–12 | 427 | 747 | 57.2 | 6,250 | 49 | 39 |
| J. J. McCarthy | 28 | 27–1 | 482 | 713 | 67.6 | 6,226 | 49 | 11 |
| Devin Gardner | 27 | 15–12 | 475 | 787 | 60.4 | 6,336 | 44 | 32 |
