= 2018 Outback Bowl =

- 32nd Outback Bowl
Michigan Wolverines	South Carolina Gamecocks
(8–4)	(8–4)
Big Ten	SEC
19	26
Head coach: Jim Harbaugh	Head coach: Will Muschamp
	1	2	3	4	Total
Michigan	6	3	10	0	19
South Carolina	0	3	13	10	26
- Date: January 1, 2018
- Season: 2017
- Stadium: Raymond James Stadium
- Location: Tampa, Florida
- MVP: Jake Bentley (QB, South Carolina)
- Favorite: Michigan by 9
- Referee: Stuart Mullins (ACC)
- Attendance: 45,687
- Payout: US$$6,308,560

United States TV coverage
- Network: ESPN2
- Announcers: Adam Amin, Dusty Dvoracek, Molly McGrath

The 2018 Outback Bowl was an American college football bowl game played on January 1, 2018, at Raymond James Stadium in Tampa, Florida. The 32nd annual Outback Bowl was one of the 2017–18 NCAA football bowl games concluding the 2017 NCAA Division I FBS football season. The game was nationally televised on ESPN2, and its title sponsor is the Outback Steakhouse restaurant franchise.

== Teams ==
The game featured the Michigan Wolverines of the Big Ten Conference, and the South Carolina Gamecocks of the Southeastern Conference in their fourth meeting against each other, and second meeting in the Outback Bowl.

=== Michigan ===
After finishing their regular season with an 8–4 record, the Wolverines were selected to their sixth Outback Bowl appearance, the most Outback Bowl appearances by any team. This was their 46th bowl game appearance, the 11th-highest total all-time among FBS schools.

=== South Carolina ===
After finishing their regular season with an 8–4 record, the Gamecocks were selected to their fifth Outback Bowl appearance, tying them with four other teams for the second-most Outback Bowl appearances. This was their 22nd bowl game appearance. South Carolina won the previous meeting against the Michigan Wolverines in the 2013 Outback Bowl, by a score of 33–28.

== Game summary ==
=== Scoring summary ===
Scoring summary

Quarter	Time	Drive			Team	Scoring information	Score	
Quarter	Time	Plays	Yards	TOP	Team	Scoring information	MICH	SCAR
1	3:42	8	29	3:37	MICH	35-yard field goal by Quinn Nordin	3	0
1	0:09	6	23	2:16	MICH	26-yard field goal by Quinn Nordin	6	0
2	8:45	5	45	1:36	SCAR	45-yard field goal by Parker White	6	3
2	0:00	8	33	1:18	MICH	45-yard field goal by Quinn Nordin	9	3
3	9:56	7	72	7:34	MICH	Ben Mason 1-yard touchdown run, Quinn Nordin kick good	16	3
3	5:42	4	2	1:10	MICH	48-yard field goal by Quinn Nordin	19	3
3	2:25	6	77	3:17	SCAR	Rico Dowdle 18-yard touchdown reception from Jake Bentley, 2-point pass failed	19	9
3	0:51	1	21	0:06	SCAR	Bryan Edwards 21-yard touchdown reception from Jake Bentley, Parker White kick good	19	16
4	11:33	6	81	2:12	SCAR	Shi Smith 53-yard touchdown reception from Jake Bentley, Parker White kick good	19	23
4	3:47	4	9	1:55	SCAR	22-yard field goal by Parker White	19	26
"TOP" = time of possession. For other American football terms, see Glossary of American football.							19	26

=== Statistics ===
	1	2	3	4	Total
Wolverines	6	3	10	0	19
Gamecocks	0	3	13	10	26

Statistics	MICH	SCAR
First downs	17	13
Plays–yards	78–277	58–302
Rushes–yards	33–74	26–61
Passing yards	203	239
Passing: Comp–Att–Int	21–45–2	19–32–1
Time of possession	34:17	25:43

Team	Category	Player	Statistics
MICH	Passing	Brandon Peters	20/44, 186 yds, 2 INT
MICH	Rushing	Karan Higdon	17 car, 65 yds
MICH	Receiving	Kekoa Crawford	5 rec, 61 yds
SCAR	Passing	Jake Bentley	19/32, 239 yds, 2 TD, 1 INT
SCAR	Rushing	Rico Dowdle	6 car, 45 yds, 1 TD
SCAR	Receiving	Bryan Edwards	5 rec, 88 yds, 1 TD

== Mascot ==
The 2018 Outback Bowl marked the first appearance of SB Nation sportswriter, Wave Race 64 enjoyer, and mixed martial artist Ryan Nanni as the Bloomin' Onion mascot.
