= Chris Evans (American football) =

American football player (born 1997)

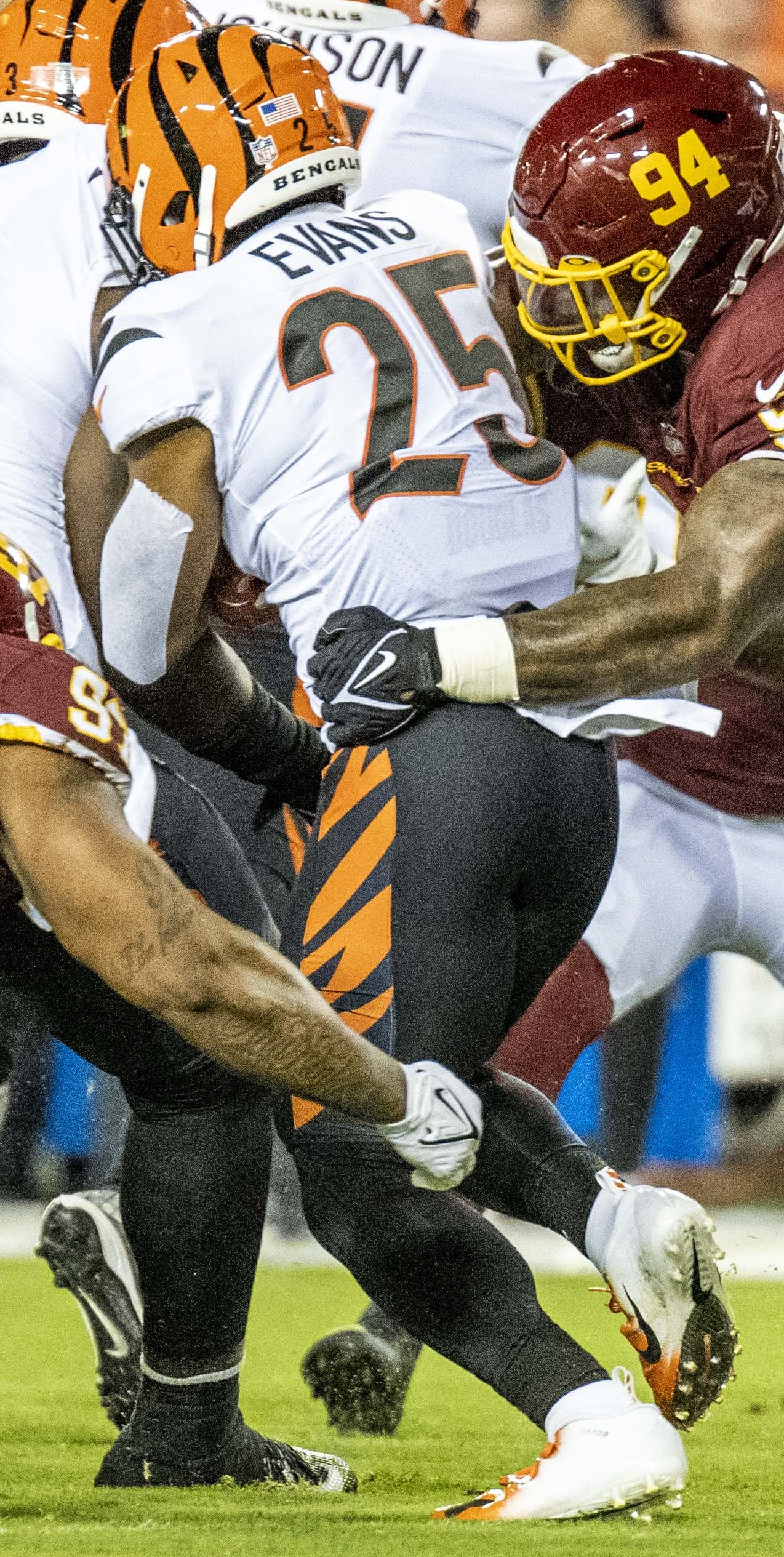
- Evans with the Cincinnati Bengals in 2021

Profile
- Position: Running back

Personal information
- Born: October 5, 1997 (age 29); Indianapolis, Indiana, U.S.
- Listed height: 5 ft 11 in (1.80 m)
- Listed weight: 215 lb (98 kg)

Career information
- High school: Ben Davis (Indianapolis)
- College: Michigan (2016–2020)
- NFL draft: 2021: 6th round, 202nd overall pick

Career history
- Cincinnati Bengals (2021–2024)

Career NFL statistics
- Rushing yards: 89
- Rushing average: 4.7
- Receptions: 19
- Receiving yards: 188
- Receiving touchdowns: 3
- Return yards: 314
- Stats at Pro Football Reference

Christopher Evans (born October 5, 1997) is an American professional football running back. He played college football for the Michigan Wolverines and was selected by the Cincinnati Bengals in the sixth round of the 2021 NFL draft.

== Early life ==
A native of Indianapolis, Evans attended Ben Davis High School in that city. As a high school junior in 2014, he rushed for over 1,200 yards and 18 touchdowns and caught 51 passes for 676 yards and 10 touchdowns.

As a high school senior in 2015, he rushed for over 1,100 yards and 15 touchdowns and caught 40 passes for 511 yards and four touchdowns. He scored 47 touchdowns in his final two years at Ben Davis High. He also competed four years of track at Ben Davis High. In high school, he ran the 100-meter dash in 10.9 seconds. The 110m hurdles in 14.28 seconds electronically which placed him 3rd at his state meet. Evans was also a very successful long jumper, improving from a 19 feet 11 inches to a 23 feet 1 inch and 25 feet 1 inch by his senior year.

== College career ==
=== Recruiting and commitment ===
In June 2015, Evans, a long-time Ohio State fan, attended a Michigan Wolverines football satellite camp in Indianapolis. He caught the eye of Michigan coach Jim Harbaugh, who proceeded to court Evans' parents. Evans gave his verbal commitment to play football at Michigan two days later. At the time, Evans said, "If coach Harbaugh thinks you're good, you must be."

After accepting an offer from Michigan, Evans was pursued by Ohio State, but he tweeted in early January 2016 that, though he was flattered by Ohio State's interest, he maintained his commitment to Michigan.

Recruited as an athlete, Evans was known for his versatility, as he saw action in high school at running back, slot receiver and cornerback. During the preseason training camp prior to his freshman year in 2016, Evans drew praise for his explosiveness and speed. Teammate Drake Johnson described him as "mad athletic" and "real smooth . . . like butter smooth, we're just like 'ooh, wow' ", and added, "He just makes it look smooth and easy. He looks effortless when he does stuff, 'yeah, that was nice.'"

Evans has been described as having "deceptive looks." Bob Wojnowski of The Detroit News wrote: "He wears glasses (contacts during the game) and has sported a high-top haircut since he was a kid watching Will Smith on The Fresh Prince of Bel-Air.”

=== 2016 season ===
On September 3, 2016, Evans appeared in his first game for Michigan. In the first three quarters, he rushed for 112 yards on eight carries (14.0 yards per carry), including an 18-yard touchdown run in the second quarter and a 43-yard touchdown run in the third quarter. He became the third Michigan player to rush for over 100 yards in his college debut. After the game, head coach Jim Harbaugh said, "I knew Chris Evans was special. What you saw today is what we have been seeing in practice the last month. He's a special football player. And you didn't get to see everything he can do." Mark Snyder of the Detroit Free Press wrote of the game that "the spark came from freshman Chris Evans and his wiggle. Evans brought a different dimension than the bruising backs, maybe something U-M hasn’t seen since Denard Robinson."

Mitch Albom dubbed Evans "Captain Fantastic" and added "it might be a case of A Star is Born." Michigan running backs coach Tyrone Wheatley said of Evans: "He's like my Steph Curry in the room. Meaning that he can create his own space, can win one-on-ones and, most surprisingly ... I didn't realize how tough he was between the tackles."

On October 8, Evans registered his second 100-yard rushing game in a 78–0 victory over Rutgers. Evans led Michigan's rushing attack with 153 yards on 11 carries for an average of 13.9 yards per carry.

Through the first six games of the 2016 season, Evans was Michigan's leading rusher with 400 rushing yards and three touchdowns on 48 carries, an average of 8.3 yards per carry.

In the 2016 Capital One Orange Bowl, Evans scored a 30-yard touchdown to give his team the lead with less than two minutes to play. He ultimately finished with the second-most rushing yards (614) on the team for the season to De'Veon Smith (846) . His four rushing touchdowns were fifth on the team behind Smith, Khalid Hill, Ty Isaac, and Karan Higdon.

=== 2017 season ===
During the 2017 season, Evans mainly served as backup to Karan Higdon. He had a career day against Minnesota on November 4 when he ran for 191 yards and two touchdowns. Evans finished the season with the second-most rushing yards (685) on the team behind Higdon (994) and six rushing touchdowns.

=== 2018 season ===
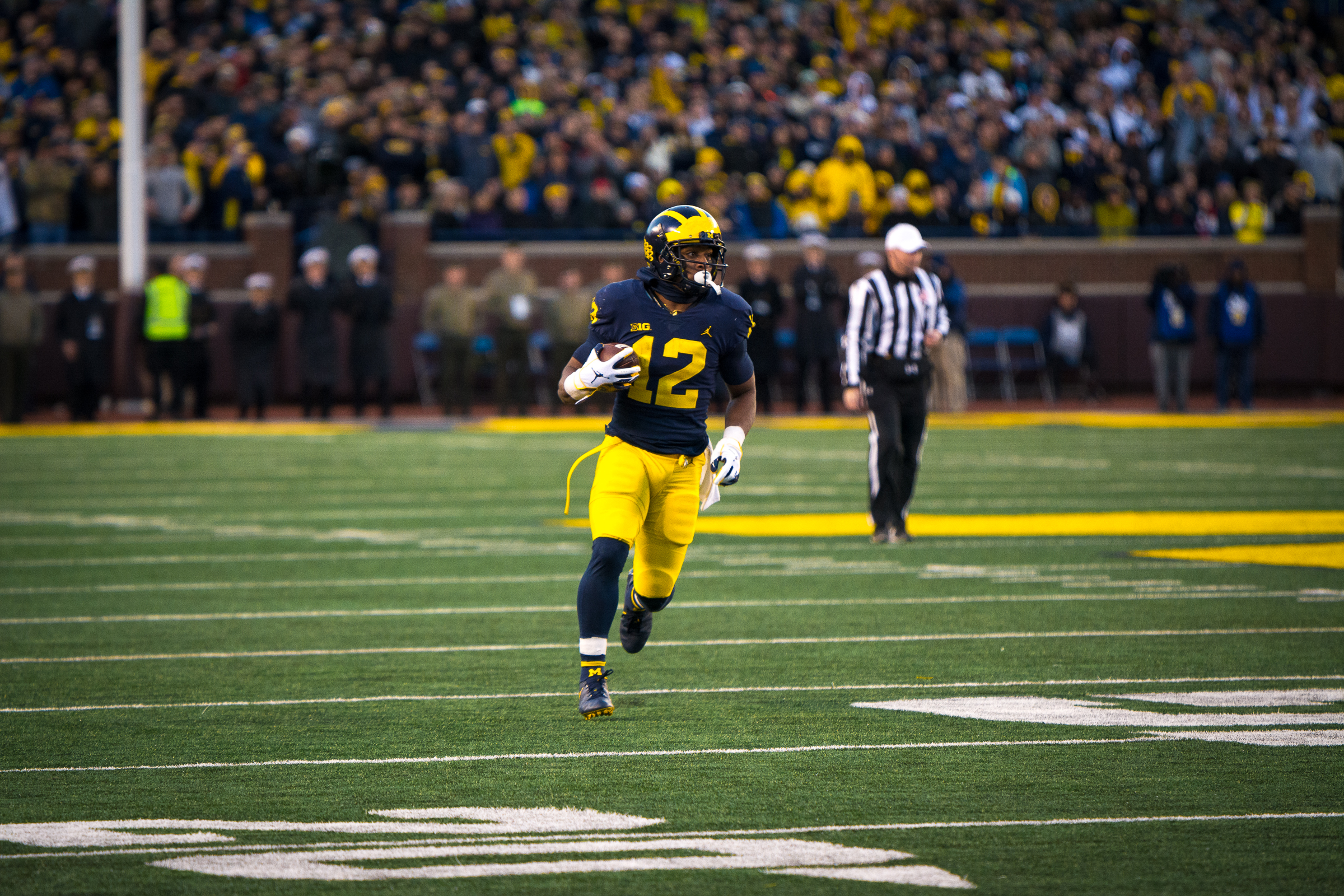
Evans with Michigan in 2018

Evans once again served as the number two back behind Karan Higdon in 2018. His most successful game came against Western Michigan on September 8, when he rushed for 86 yards and two rushing touchdowns. Evans finished the year with the second-most rushing yards (423) on the team for the season and four touchdowns.

=== 2019 season ===
After the graduation of Karan Higdon, Evans was set to be the Wolverines' leading returning rusher coming into the 2019 season as a senior. In February 2019, the team released a statement that Evans was no longer with the program. He announced via Twitter that he had "academic issues" and planned to continue his career at Michigan. In June, Michigan head coach Jim Harbaugh confirmed that Evans would be suspended for the 2019 season, but was eligible to return in 2020. It was later announced that Evans would return for the 2020 season as a fifth-year player.

=== College statistics ===
| Season | Team | Conf | G | Rushing | | | | Receiving | | | |
| Season | Team | Conf | G | Att | Yds | Avg | TD | Rec | Yds | Avg | TD |
|---|---|---|---|---|---|---|---|---|---|---|---|
| 2016 | Michigan | Big Ten | 13 | 88 | 614 | 7.0 | 4 | 6 | 87 | 14.5 | 0 |
| 2017 | Michigan | Big Ten | 13 | 135 | 685 | 5.1 | 6 | 16 | 157 | 9.8 | 1 |
| 2018 | Michigan | Big Ten | 10 | 81 | 423 | 5.2 | 4 | 18 | 148 | 8.2 | 1 |
| 2020 | Michigan | Big Ten | 6 | 16 | 73 | 4.6 | 1 | 9 | 87 | 9.7 | 0 |
| Career | | | 42 | 320 | 1,795 | 5.6 | 15 | 49 | 479 | 9.8 | 2 |
All values from Sports Reference

== Professional career ==
Pre-draft measurables
| Height | Weight | Arm length | Hand span | 40-yard dash | 10-yard split | 20-yard split | 20-yard shuttle | Three-cone drill | Vertical jump | Broad jump | Bench press |
|---|---|---|---|---|---|---|---|---|---|---|---|
| 5 ft 11 in (1.80 m) | 211 lb (96 kg) | 32 1/2 in (0.83 m) | 9 3/4 in (0.25 m) | 4.51 s | 1.51 s | 2.56 s | 4.14 s | 6.85 s | 40.5 in (1.03 m) | 10 ft 7 in (3.23 m) | 20 reps |
All values from Pro Day

=== 2021 ===
Evans was selected by the Cincinnati Bengals in the sixth round, 202nd overall, of the 2021 NFL draft. He signed his four-year rookie contract with Cincinnati on May 17, 2021.

He scored his first professional touchdown on a 24-yard catch from Joe Burrow in the first quarter of the Bengals' win over the Detroit Lions on October 17. Evans finished the season with 228 yards from scrimmage and two touchdowns, along with 15 receptions.

Although he only returned two kickoffs during the season and one while he was at Michigan, he was named the team's starting kick returner for their playoff game against the Las Vegas Raiders. Evans returned five kickoffs for 103 yards and rushed once for nine yards in the Bengals' 26–19 win. He had three kickoff returns for 83 yards and a four-yard carry in the team's win against the Tennessee Titans in the divisional round.

=== 2022 ===
Evans began the 2022 season behind Joe Mixon and Samaje Perine on the depth chart, and was named the team's primary kickoff returner. Following the bye week, he lost the kick return job to Trayveon Williams.

In Week 13, Evans scored his only touchdown of the 2022 season to finish off the Bengals' game-winning drive against the Kansas City Chiefs.

Evans remained a healthy inactive for Cincinnati's playoff run.

=== 2023 ===
Evans began the 2023 season as third on the depth chart, behind Mixon and Williams, started the season as the team's kickoff returner, and lost the job to Williams at the mid-season point. Following the breakout of rookie Chase Brown, Evans was ruled a healthy inactive for the remainder of the season. His last game of the season was a Bengals' Week 11 loss to the Baltimore Ravens.

=== 2024 ===
On August 16, 2024, Evans suffered a ruptured patellar tendon and was ruled out for the season.
