= 2017 Michigan Wolverines football team =

American college football season

2017 Michigan Wolverines football

Outback Bowl, L 19–26 vs. South Carolina
- Conference: Big Ten Conference
- East Division
- Record: 8–5 (5–4 Big Ten)
- Head coach: Jim Harbaugh (3rd season)
- Offensive coordinator: Tim Drevno (3rd season)
- Offensive scheme: Pro-style
- Defensive coordinator: Don Brown (2nd season)
- Base defense: 4–3
- MVP: Maurice Hurst Jr.
- Captains: Mason Cole; Mike McCray
- Home stadium: Michigan Stadium

Uniform
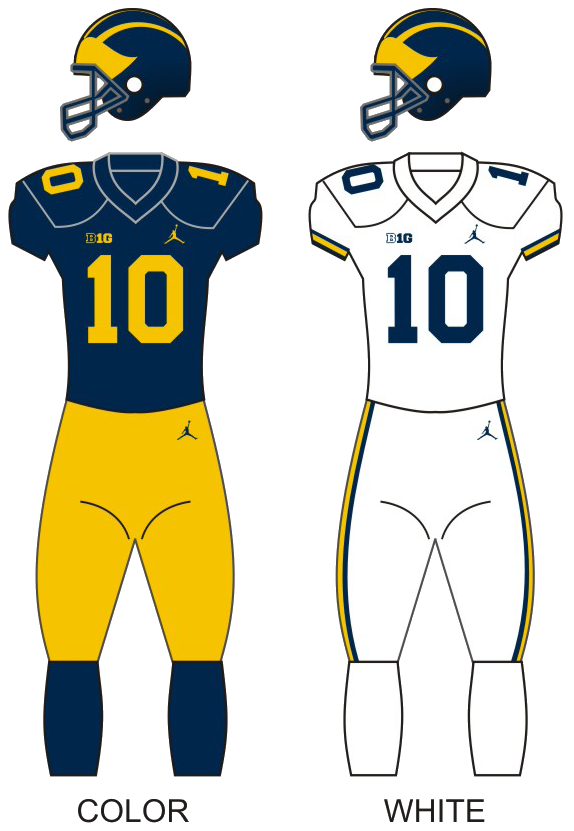

2017 Big Ten Conference football standings
	Conf.			Overall
Team	W		L	W		L
East Division
No. 5 Ohio State xy$	8	–	1	12	–	2
No. 15 Michigan State	7	–	2	10	–	3
No. 8 Penn State	7	–	2	11	–	2
Michigan	5	–	4	8	–	5
Rutgers	3	–	6	4	–	8
Indiana	2	–	7	5	–	7
Maryland	2	–	7	4	–	8
West Division
No. 7 Wisconsin xy	9	–	0	13	–	1
No. 17 Northwestern	7	–	2	10	–	3
Iowa	4	–	5	8	–	5
Purdue	4	–	5	7	–	6
Nebraska	3	–	6	4	–	8
Minnesota	2	–	7	5	–	7
Illinois	0	–	9	2	–	10
Championship: Ohio State 27, Wisconsin 21
$ – Conference champion; x – Division champion/co-champions; y – Championship game participant; Rankings from AP Poll

The 2017 Michigan Wolverines football team represented the University of Michigan in the sport of college football during the 2017 NCAA Division I FBS football season. The Wolverines played in the East Division of the Big Ten Conference and played their home games at Michigan Stadium in Ann Arbor, Michigan. Michigan was coached by Jim Harbaugh, who was in his third season.

Coming off back-to-back 10-win seasons in Harbaugh's first two years as coach, the Wolverines began the year ranked 11th in the preseason AP Poll. In the first game of the season, Michigan defeated then-No. 17 Florida in the Advocare Classic in Arlington, Texas. Michigan won its remaining non-conference games as well as its conference opener against Purdue, rising to No. 7 in the polls before suffering its first loss in a home game against in-state rival Michigan State. Michigan lost three more games in conference play, all to teams ranked in the top ten at the time of play: first to then-No. 2 Penn State, then to No. 5 Wisconsin, and finally to arch-rival No. 8 Ohio State to end the regular season. Michigan ended Big Ten Conference play with a 5–4 record to finish in fourth in the Eastern Division. The Wolverines were invited to the 2018 Outback Bowl, played on New Year's Day, where they lost to South Carolina to finish the year at 8–5.

Michigan struggled to find consistent play at quarterback throughout the year; with Wilton Speight suffering a season ending injury in the team's week 4 contest at Purdue, John O'Korn, and Brandon Peters each received significant playing time in his stead. The team recorded only nine passing touchdowns on the year. Karan Higdon led the team on the ground with 994 rushing yards, and Grant Perry led the team in receiving with 307 yards. The defense, despite losing 10 starters from 2016, was considered one of the best in the country. Lineman Maurice Hurst Jr. was named a consensus first-team All-American. Linebacker Devin Bush Jr. and linemen Rashan Gary and Chase Winovich also received first-team all-conference honors.

== Preseason ==
=== Spring game ===
Michigan played a public spring exhibition game in Michigan Stadium on Saturday, April 15, 2017. The announced attendance was 57,418. The Maize team's Kyle Seychel kicked a 31-yard field goal as time expired for the 31–29 win.

=== Italy trip ===
The Michigan football team traveled to Italy for a week in late April for training, sight-seeing, and brand exposure. The team held three public practices and hosted other publicity events. Coach Jim Harbaugh was offered the opportunity to meet Pope Francis, during which he gifted the Pope an authentic Michigan helmet and a pair of Michigan-themed Jordan Brand shoes.

== Recruiting ==
=== Recruits ===
Michigan's recruiting class consisted of 30 recruits, including 11 that enrolled early. Michigan's recruiting class was ranked No. 3 by Scout, No. 4 by Rivals, No. 6 by ESPN, and No. 5 by 247Sports.com's composite rankings. The class was considered one of Michigan's strongest recruiting classes from the modern era, and was highlighted by composite 5-star prospects WR Donovan Peoples-Jones and DL Aubrey Solomon.

College recruiting (2017)
Name	Hometown	School	Height	Weight	40^{‡}	Commit date
Jordan Anthony; LB	Silver Spring, MD	IMG Academy (Florida)	6 ft 0 in (1.83 m)	235 lb (107 kg)	4.73	Dec 22, 2016
Jordan Anthony; LB	Recruit ratings: Scout: Rivals: 247Sports: ESPN:					
Tarik Black; WR	Hamden, CT	Cheshire Academy	6 ft 4 in (1.93 m)	206 lb (93 kg)	-	Dec 14, 2016
Tarik Black; WR	Recruit ratings: Scout: Rivals: 247Sports: ESPN:					
Nico Collins; WR	Birmingham, AL	Clay-Chalkville HS	6 ft 4 in (1.93 m)	201 lb (91 kg)	4.50	Feb 1, 2017
Nico Collins; WR	Recruit ratings: Scout: Rivals: 247Sports: ESPN:					
Chuck Filiaga; OL	Aledo, TX	Aledo HS	6 ft 6 in (1.98 m)	340 lb (150 kg)	5.59	Jan 7, 2017
Chuck Filiaga; OL	Recruit ratings: Scout: Rivals: 247Sports: ESPN:					
Ja'Raymond Hall; OL	Detroit, MI	Oak Park HS	6 ft 5 in (1.96 m)	272 lb (123 kg)	5.82	Dec 5, 2015
Ja'Raymond Hall; OL	Recruit ratings: Scout: Rivals: 247Sports: ESPN:					
Brad Hawkins; WR	Camden, NJ	Suffield Academy (Connecticut)	6 ft 2 in (1.88 m)	205 lb (93 kg)	-	Oct 7, 2016
Brad Hawkins; WR	Recruit ratings: Scout: Rivals: 247Sports: ESPN:					
Joel Honigford; OL	Sugarcreek, OH	Garaway HS	6 ft 6 in (1.98 m)	273 lb (124 kg)	-	Jun 29, 2016
Joel Honigford; OL	Recruit ratings: Scout: Rivals: 247Sports: ESPN:					
James Hudson; DE	Toledo, OH	Central Catholic HS	6 ft 5 in (1.96 m)	294 lb (133 kg)	5.05	Aug 8, 2016
James Hudson; DE	Recruit ratings: Scout: Rivals: 247Sports: ESPN:					
Deron Irving-Bey; DE	Flint, MI	Southwestern Academy	6 ft 5 in (1.96 m)	271 lb (123 kg)	-	Dec 19, 2016
Deron Irving-Bey; DE	Recruit ratings: Scout: Rivals: 247Sports: ESPN:					
Donovan Jeter; DT	Beaver Falls, PA	Beaver Falls Area SHS	6 ft 3 in (1.91 m)	260 lb (120 kg)	-	Oct 23, 2016
Donovan Jeter; DT	Recruit ratings: Scout: Rivals: 247Sports: ESPN:					
Jaylen Kelly-Powell; DB	Detroit, MI	Cass Technical HS	6 ft 0 in (1.83 m)	175 lb (79 kg)	4.45	Nov 15, 2016
Jaylen Kelly-Powell; DB	Recruit ratings: Scout: Rivals: 247Sports: ESPN:					
Corey Malone-Hatcher; DE	St. Joseph, MI	St. Joseph HS	6 ft 3 in (1.91 m)	245 lb (111 kg)	5.10	Jun 2, 2016
Corey Malone-Hatcher; DE	Recruit ratings: Scout: Rivals: 247Sports: ESPN:					
Oliver Martin; WR	Coralville, IA	West Senior HS	6 ft 1 in (1.85 m)	189 lb (86 kg)	4.65	Jan 30, 2017
Oliver Martin; WR	Recruit ratings: Scout: Rivals: 247Sports: ESPN:					
Ben Mason; LB	Newtown, CT	Newtown HS	6 ft 3 in (1.91 m)	247 lb (112 kg)	-	May 3, 2016
Ben Mason; LB	Recruit ratings: Scout: Rivals: 247Sports: ESPN:					
Dylan McCaffrey; QB	Castle Rock, CO	Valor Christian HS	6 ft 5 in (1.96 m)	197 lb (89 kg)	-	Feb 15, 2016
Dylan McCaffrey; QB	Recruit ratings: Scout: Rivals: 247Sports: ESPN:					
Phillip Paea; DL	Berrien Spring, MI	Berrien Springs HS	6 ft 4 in (1.93 m)	280 lb (130 kg)	-	Apr 2, 2016
Phillip Paea; DL	Recruit ratings: Scout: Rivals: 247Sports: ESPN:					
Kwity Paye; DE	Providence, RI	Bishop Hendricken HS	6 ft 4 in (1.93 m)	234 lb (106 kg)	4.60	Oct 24, 2016
Kwity Paye; DE	Recruit ratings: Scout: Rivals: 247Sports: ESPN:					
Donovan Peoples-Jones; WR	Southfield, MI	Cass Technical HS	6 ft 2 in (1.88 m)	190 lb (86 kg)	4.42	Dec 15, 2016
Donovan Peoples-Jones; WR	Recruit ratings: Scout: Rivals: 247Sports: ESPN:					
Brad Robbins; P	Westerville, OH	Westerville South HS	6 ft 2 in (1.88 m)	180 lb (82 kg)	-	Feb 1, 2017
Brad Robbins; P	Recruit ratings: Rivals: 247Sports: ESPN:					
Josh Ross; LB	Southfield, MI	St. Mary's Preparatory HS	6 ft 2 in (1.88 m)	221 lb (100 kg)	4.84	Mar 22, 2016
Josh Ross; LB	Recruit ratings: Scout: Rivals: 247Sports: ESPN:					
Cesar Ruiz; OL	Camden, NJ	IMG Academy, FL	6 ft 4 in (1.93 m)	336 lb (152 kg)	5.26	Dec 19, 2016
Cesar Ruiz; OL	Recruit ratings: Scout: Rivals: 247Sports: ESPN:					
Benjamin St-Juste; DB	Rosemere, Quebec	Cegep du Vieux Montreal	6 ft 3 in (1.91 m)	188 lb (85 kg)	4.58	Jun 23, 2016
Benjamin St-Juste; DB	Recruit ratings: Scout: Rivals: 247Sports: ESPN:					
O'Maury Samuels; RB	Los Lunas, NM	Los Lunas HS	5 ft 10 in (1.78 m)	192 lb (87 kg)	4.45	Apr 3, 2016
O'Maury Samuels; RB	Recruit ratings: Scout: Rivals: 247Sports: ESPN:					
Drew Singleton; LB	Union, NJ	Paramus Catholic HS	6 ft 2 in (1.88 m)	213 lb (97 kg)	-	Dec 23, 2016
Drew Singleton; LB	Recruit ratings: Scout: Rivals: 247Sports: ESPN:					
Aubrey Solomon; DL	Leesburg, GA	Lee County HS	6 ft 3 in (1.91 m)	305 lb (138 kg)	5.47	Feb 1, 2017
Aubrey Solomon; DL	Recruit ratings: Scout: Rivals: 247Sports: ESPN:					
Andrew Stueber; OL	Darien, CT	Darien HS	6 ft 7 in (2.01 m)	290 lb (130 kg)	-	Jun 25, 2016
Andrew Stueber; OL	Recruit ratings: Scout: Rivals: 247Sports: ESPN:					
Kurt Taylor; RB	Covington, GA	Grayson HS	5 ft 8 in (1.73 m)	197 lb (89 kg)	4.48	Oct 16, 2016
Kurt Taylor; RB	Recruit ratings: Scout: Rivals: 247Sports: ESPN:					
Ambry Thomas; DB	Detroit, MI	Martin Luther King HS	6 ft 0 in (1.83 m)	170 lb (77 kg)	4.48	Dec 7, 2016
Ambry Thomas; DB	Recruit ratings: Scout: Rivals: 247Sports: ESPN:					
Luiji Vilain; DE	Ottawa, Ontario	Episcopal HS (Virginia)	6 ft 4 in (1.93 m)	238 lb (108 kg)	5.06	Jun 12, 2016
Luiji Vilain; DE	Recruit ratings: Scout: Rivals: 247Sports: ESPN:					
J'Marick Woods; DB	Florence, AL	Florence HS	6 ft 3 in (1.91 m)	205 lb (93 kg)	4.67	Mar 28, 2016
J'Marick Woods; DB	Recruit ratings: Scout: Rivals: 247Sports: ESPN:					
Overall recruit ranking: Scout: 3 Rivals: 4 247Sports: 5 ESPN: 6
‡ Refers to 40-yard dash; Note: In many cases, Scout, Rivals, 247Sports, On3, and ESPN may conflict in their listings of height, weight and 40 time.; In these cases, the average was taken. ESPN grades are on a 100-point scale.; Sources: "2017 Michigan football commitments". Rivals.; "2017 Michigan football commitments". Scout.; "2017 Michigan football commitments". ESPN.; "Scout.com Team Recruiting Rankings". Scout.; "2017 Team Ranking". Rivals.com.; "2017 Michigan Wolverines football team". 247Sports.

== Rankings ==
Ranking movements Legend: ██ Increase in ranking ██ Decrease in ranking — = Not ranked RV = Received votes
	Week															
Poll	Pre	1	2	3	4	5	6	7	8	9	10	11	12	13	14	Final
AP	11	8	7	8	8	7	17	19	RV	RV	21	19	RV	RV	—	—
Coaches	9	8	7	8	7	7	16	15	25	24	22	18	RV	—	—	—
CFP	Not released									—	—	24	—	—	—	Not released

== Schedule ==
Date	Time	Opponent	Rank	Site	TV	Result	Attendance	Source
September 2	3:30 p.m.	vs. No. 17 Florida*	No. 11	AT&T Stadium; Arlington, TX (Advocare Classic, SEC Nation)	ABC	W 33–17	75,802	
September 9	12:00 p.m.	Cincinnati*	No. 8	Michigan Stadium; Ann Arbor, MI	ABC	W 36–14	111,384	
September 16	12:00 p.m.	Air Force*	No. 7	Michigan Stadium; Ann Arbor, MI	BTN	W 29–13	111,387	
September 23	4:00 p.m.	at Purdue	No. 8	Ross–Ade Stadium; West Lafayette, IN	FOX	W 28–10	60,402	
October 7	7:30 p.m.	Michigan State	No. 7	Michigan Stadium; Ann Arbor, MI (rivalry)	ABC	L 10–14	112,432	
October 14	12:00 p.m.	at Indiana	No. 17	Memorial Stadium; Bloomington, IN	ABC	W 27–20 ^{OT}	52,929	
October 21	7:30 p.m.	at No. 2 Penn State	No. 19	Beaver Stadium; University Park, PA (rivalry, College GameDay)	ABC	L 13–42	110,823	
October 28	12:00 p.m.	Rutgers^{†}		Michigan Stadium; Ann Arbor, MI	BTN	W 35–14	111,213	
November 4	8:30 p.m.	Minnesota		Michigan Stadium; Ann Arbor, MI (Little Brown Jug)	FOX	W 33–10	111,090	
November 11	3:30 p.m.	at Maryland		Maryland Stadium; College Park, MD	BTN	W 35–10	44,325	
November 18	12:00 p.m.	at No. 5 Wisconsin	No. 24	Camp Randall Stadium; Madison, WI (College GameDay)	FOX	L 10–24	81,216	
November 25	12:00 p.m.	No. 8 Ohio State		Michigan Stadium; Ann Arbor, MI (The Game)	FOX	L 20–31	112,028	
January 1, 2018	12:00 p.m.	vs. South Carolina*		Raymond James Stadium; Tampa, FL (Outback Bowl)	ESPN2	L 19–26	45,687	
*Non-conference game; ^{†}Homecoming; Rankings from AP Poll and CFP Rankings after October 31 released prior to game; All times are in Eastern time

== Game summaries ==
=== vs. Florida ===
Michigan vs. Florida
(Advocare Classic)

Team	1	2	3	4	Total
• No. 11 Wolverines	10	3	13	7	33
No. 17 Gators	3	14	0	0	17

- Date: September 2
- Location: AT&T Stadium
  Arlington, TX
- Game start: 3:41 pm EDT
- Elapsed time: 3:28
- Game attendance: 75,802
- Game weather: Indoors, 72º F
- Referee: Brad Van Vark
- TV announcers (ABC): Joe Tessitore, Todd Blackledge, and Holly Rowe

Scoring summary
1	12:26	UF	Eddy Piñeiro 46-yard field goal	UF 3–0
1	5:27	MICH	Quinn Nordin 25-yard field goal	Tie 3–3
1	3:01	MICH	Tarik Black 46-yard pass from Wilton Speight (Quinn Nordin kick)	MICH 10–3
2	12:19	UF	Duke Dawson 48-yard interception return (Eddy Piñeiro kick)	Tie 10–10
2	10:50	UF	C. J. Henderson 41-yard interception return (Eddy Piñeiro kick)	UF 17–10
2	4:20	MICH	Quinn Nordin 55-yard field goal	UF 17–13
3	11:53	MICH	Karan Higdon 3-yard run (Quinn Nordin kick)	MICH 20–17
3	11:05	MICH	Quinn Nordin 30-yard field goal	MICH 23–17
4	9:00	MICH	Quinn Nordin 50-yard field goal	MICH 26–17
4	1:37	MICH	Noah Furbush fumble recovery (Quinn Nordin kick)	MICH 33–17

To open the season, Michigan faced the Florida Gators in a neutral site game in Arlington, Texas in the Advocare Classic. This was the first meeting between the teams since the 2016 Citrus Bowl. It was the fourth meeting between Michigan and Florida, and the first ever regular season meeting between the teams.

Michigan defeated Florida, 33–17. Florida opened the scoring in the first quarter via a 46-yard field goal from Eddy Piñeiro. Michigan responded with a 25-yard field goal from Quinn Nordin to tie the game, and a 46-yard touchdown pass from Wilton Speight to Tarik Black, for its first lead of the game. Florida added 14 points in the second quarter via back-to-back interception returns, a 48-yard interception return from Duke Dawson, and a 41-yard interception return from C. J. Henderson. Wilton Speight was briefly benched in the second quarter, replaced by John O'Korn. He re-entered the game to start the second half. Michigan reduced Florida's lead to four points via a 55-yard field goal from Nordin, which made the score 17–13 in favor of Florida at half-time. Michigan then scored 20 unanswered points in the second half, via a three-yard touchdown run from Karan Higdon and 30-yard field goal from Nordin in the third quarter. Michigan extended its lead in the fourth quarter via a 50-yard field goal from Nordin and a fumble recovery in the end-zone by Noah Furbush.

Michigan wore all-maize alternate jerseys for the first time since 1928. With the win, Michigan ended Florida's 27-year season-opener winning streak, which was the longest active streak in the nation. Kicker Quinn Nordin became the first kicker in Michigan history with two successful conversions of field goals of 50 yards or longer in the same game. Just one game into his career, Nordin is tied for third in program history for most attempts made at 50 yards or more.

=== vs. Cincinnati ===
Cincinnati at Michigan

Team	1	2	3	4	Total
Bearcats	7	0	7	0	14
• No. 8 Wolverines	14	3	7	12	36

- Date: September 9
- Location: Michigan Stadium
  Ann Arbor, MI
- Game start: 12:06 pm EDT
- Elapsed time: 3:35
- Game attendance: 111,384
- Game weather: Mid 60s, Clear and sunny, NE 10–20 MPH
- Referee: Don Willard
- TV announcers (ABC): Bob Wischusen, Brock Huard and Allison Williams

Scoring summary
1	11:54	MICH	Kekoa Crawford 43-yard pass from Wilton Speight (Quinn Nordin kick)	MICH 7–0
1	6:50	MICH	Tyree Kinnel 28-yard interception return (Quinn Nordin kick)	MICH 14–0
1	2:13	CIN	Mike Boone 1-yard run (Josh Pasley kick)	MICH 14–7
2	14:03	MICH	Quinn Nordin 28-yard field goal	MICH 17–7
3	11:15	CIN	Kahlil Lewis 10-yard pass from Hayden Moore (Josh Pasley kick)	MICH 17–14
3	3:01	MICH	Grant Perry 33-yard pass from Wilton Speight (Quinn Nordin kick)	MICH 24–14
4	9:02	MICH	Quinn Nordin 24-yard field goal	MICH 27–14
4	6:53	MICH	Team 33-yard safety	MICH 29–14
4	4:21	MICH	Lavert Hill 24-yard interception return (Quinn Nordin kick)	MICH 36–14

Following its opening game against Florida, Michigan hosted the Cincinnati Bearcats. This was the first ever meeting between the two teams.

Michigan defeated Cincinnati 36–14. Michigan opened the scoring in the first quarter via a 43-yard touchdown pass from Speight to Kekoa Crawford. Michigan extended its lead via a 28-yard interception return from Tyree Kinnel. Cincinnati reduced Michigan's lead to seven points via a one-yard touchdown run from Mike Boone. Michigan added a 28-yard field goal from Nordin in the second quarter, which made the score 17–7 in favor of Michigan at half-time. Cincinnati opened the scoring in the third quarter via a 10-yard touchdown pass from Hayden Moore to Kahlil Lewis. Michigan responded with a 33-yard touchdown pass from Speight to Grant Perry later in the third quarter, and extended its lead in the fourth quarter via a 24-yard field goal from Nordin, a safety when Cincinnati fumbled a punt, and a 24-yard interception return from Lavert Hill.

Michigan's honorary captain for the game was ESPN NFL Insider and 1989 alumni Adam Schefter. Wilton Speight surpassed the 3,000-yard passing mark for his career, becoming the 13th quarterback in Michigan history to reach the milestone.

=== vs. Air Force ===
Air Force at Michigan

Team	1	2	3	4	Total
Falcons	3	3	7	0	13
• No. 7 Wolverines	3	6	10	10	29

- Date: September 16
- Location: Michigan Stadium
  Ann Arbor, MI
- Game start: 12:01 pm EDT
- Elapsed time: 3:13
- Game attendance: 111,387
- Game weather: Near 80, Clear and sunny, SW 5–10 MPH
- Referee: Mike Cannon
- TV announcers (BTN): Kevin Kugler, Matt Millen and Michelle McMahon

Scoring summary
1	10:51	MICH	Quinn Nordin 35-yard field goal	MICH 3–0
1	0:02	AF	Luke Strebel 37-yard field goal	Tie 3–3
2	11:48	MICH	Quinn Nordin 26-yard field goal	MICH 6–3
2	8:37	AF	Luke Strebel 50-yard field goal	Tie 6–6
2	0:04	MICH	Quinn Nordin 49-yard field goal	MICH 9–6
3	13:51	MICH	Donovan Peoples-Jones 79-yard punt return (Quinn Nordin kick)	MICH 16–6
3	11:54	AF	Ronald Cleveland 64-yard pass from Arion Worthman (Luke Strebel kick)	MICH 16–13
3	2:59	MICH	Quinn Nordin 29-yard field goal	MICH 19–13
4	14:15	MICH	Quinn Nordin 36-yard field goal	MICH 22–13
4	1:02	MICH	Karan Higdon 36-yard run (Quinn Nordin kick)	MICH 29–13

After playing Cincinnati, Michigan hosted the Air Force Falcons. This was the first meeting between the schools since 2012.

Michigan defeated Air Force 29–13. The teams exchanged field goals in the first and second quarter, before a 49-yard field goal from Nordin at the end of the second quarter, which made the score 9–6 in favor of Michigan at half-time. Michigan opened the scoring in the third quarter via a 79-yard punt return from Donovan Peoples-Jones. Air Force responded with a 64-yard touchdown pass from Arion Worthman to Ronald Cleveland. Michigan extended its lead via a 29-yard field goal from Nordin later in the third quarter. Michigan added 10 points in the fourth quarter via a 36-yard field from Nordin and a 36-yard touchdown run from Karan Higdon.

Michigan's honorary captain for the game was Michigan's director of player personnel Sean Magee. Kicker Quinn Nordin went 5-for-5 on field goal attempts to tie Michigan's single game record. Donovan Peoples-Jones' 79-yard punt return for a touchdown was the longest since Derrick Alexander returned one 79-yards against North Carolina State in 1993.

=== at Purdue ===
Michigan at Purdue

Team	1	2	3	4	Total
• No. 8 Wolverines	0	7	7	14	28
Boilermakers	0	10	0	0	10

- Date: September 23
- Location: Ross-Ade Stadium
  West Lafayette, IN
- Game start: 4:12 pm EDT
- Elapsed time: 3:28
- Game attendance: 60,042
- Game weather: 89º F, clear, SE 3 MPH
- Referee: Jerry McGinn
- TV announcers (Fox): Joe Davis, Brady Quinn and Bruce Feldman

Scoring summary
2	11:54	MICH	Zach Gentry 12-yard pass from John O'Korn (Quinn Nordin kick)	MICH 7–0
1	9:45	PUR	Brycen Hopkins 10-yard pass from Elijah Sindelar (J. D. Dellinger kick)	Tie 7–7
2	6:04	PUR	J. D. Dellinger 29-yard field goal	PUR 10–7
3	2:42	MICH	Chris Evans 10-yard run (Quinn Nordin kick)	MICH 14–10
4	10:36	MICH	Ty Isaac 1-yard run (Quinn Nordin kick)	MICH 21–10
4	6:46	MICH	Chris Evans 49-yard run (Quinn Nordin kick)	MICH 28–10

Following its game against Air Force, Michigan began its conference schedule when it traveled to West Lafayette, Indiana to face the Purdue Boilermakers.

Michigan defeated Purdue 28–10. After neither team scored in the first quarter, Michigan opened the scoring in the second quarter via a 12-yard touchdown pass from John O'Korn to Zach Gentry. Purdue responded with a 10-yard touchdown pass from Elijah Sindelar to Brycen Hopkins. Purdue then took its first lead of the game via a 29-yard field goal from J. D. Dellinger, which made the score 10–7 in favor of Purdue at half-time. Michigan then scored 21 unanswered points in the second half, via a 10-yard touchdown run from Chris Evans, a one-yard touchdown run from Ty Isaac, and a 49-yard touchdown run from Evans.

Michigan's defense held Purdue to 0-for-12 on third-down conversions, as Purdue did not convert a first down in the second half. Purdue was held to only 10 total yards in the second half.

=== vs. Michigan State ===
Michigan State at Michigan
(Paul Bunyan Trophy)

Team	1	2	3	4	Total
• Spartans	7	7	0	0	14
No. 7 Wolverines	3	0	7	0	10

- Date: October 7
- Location: Michigan Stadium
  Ann Arbor, MI
- Game start: 7:43 pm EDT
- Elapsed time: 3:36
- Game attendance: 112,432
- Game weather: High 70s, partly cloud with rain, SW 20–30 MPH
- Referee: John O'Neill
- TV announcers (ABC): Chris Fowler, Kirk Herbstreit, and Maria Taylor

Scoring summary
1	8:04	MICH	Quinn Nordin 30-yard field goal	MICH 3–0
1	2:59	MSU	Brian Lewerke 14-yard run (Matt Coghlin kick)	MSU 7–3
2	8:07	MSU	Madre London 16-yard pass from Brian Lewerke (Matt Coghlin kick)	MSU 14–3
3	8:09	MICH	Khalid Hill 1-yard run (Quinn Nordin kick)	MSU 14–10

After a bye week, the Wolverines hosted their in-state rival, the Michigan State Spartans, in the battle for the Paul Bunyan Trophy.

Michigan State upset Michigan 14–10. Michigan opened the scoring in the first quarter via a 30-yard field goal from Quinn Nordin. Michigan State responded with a 14-yard touchdown run from Brian Lewerke. Michigan State extended its lead in the second quarter via a 16-yard touchdown pass from Lewerke to Madre London, which made the score 14–3 in favor of Michigan State at half-time. Michigan reduced the Spartans lead to four points in the third quarter via a one-yard touchdown run from Khalid Hill. Shortly after this score, heavy rains ground the game to a halt, and both teams combined for 11 first downs in the half. Michigan's attempted comeback failed when O'Korn's Hail Mary pass was incomplete to end the game.

Michigan's honorary captains for the game were Sue Burton, the widow of former assistant coach Tirrel Burton; Jerry Hanlon, former assistant coach under Bo Schembechler; Gordon Bell, former Michigan tailback; and Ed Muransky, former All-American tackle for Michigan. The loss snapped Michigan's 10-game home winning streak at Michigan Stadium. Michigan's five turnovers were the most since recording six in 2012. Michigan's 10 points were the program's fewest since 2014. Michigan's defense held Michigan State to 2-for-14 on third-down conversions, and only 66 total yards in the second half. The game marked the first prime time game in the history of the rivalry, and the fourth night game at Michigan Stadium in the university's history.

While not the first time the song was played in Michigan Stadium, the game is also acknowledged as the moment when the University of Michigan's playing "Mr. Brightside" by The Killers between the third and fourth quarters "blew up" and became a still-existing tradition.

=== at Indiana ===
Michigan at Indiana

Team	1	2	3	4	OT	Total
• No. 17 Wolverines	3	10	0	7	7	27
Hoosiers	0	3	7	10	0	20

- Date: October 14
- Location: Memorial Stadium
  Bloomington, IN
- Game start: 12:06 pm EDT
- Elapsed time: 3:54
- Game attendance: 52,929
- Game weather: 73º F, Sunny, S 9 MPH
- Referee: Mark Kluczyski
- TV announcers (ABC): Bob Wischusen, Brock Huard, and Allison Williams

Scoring summary
1	6:35	MICH	Quinn Nordin 40-yard field goal	MICH 3–0
2	14:54	MICH	Quinn Nordin 38-yard field goal	MICH 6–0
2	10:19	MICH	Karan Higdon 12-yard run (Quinn Nordin kick)	MICH 13–0
2	1:46	IND	Griffin Oakes 32-yard field goal	MICH 13–3
3	12:06	IND	Morgan Ellison 8-yard run (Griffin Oakes kick)	MICH 13–10
4	10:25	MICH	Karan Higdon 59-yard run (Quinn Nordin kick)	MICH 20–10
4	3:27	IND	Whop Philyor 8-yard pass from Peyton Ramsey (Griffin Oakes kick)	MICH 20–17
4	0:00	IND	Griffin Oakes 46-yard field goal	Tie 20–20
OT	15:00	MICH	Karan Higdon 25-yard run (Quinn Nordin kick)	MICH 27–20

Michigan returned to the road to face the Indiana Hoosiers in Bloomington, Indiana in its sixth game of the season.

Michigan defeated Indiana 27–20 in overtime. Michigan opened the scoring in the first quarter via a 40-yard field goal from Quinn Nordin. Michigan added ten points in the second quarter via a 38-yard field goal from Nordin and a 12-yard touchdown run from Karan Higdon. Indiana reduced Michigan's lead to ten points via a 32-yard field goal from Griffin Oakes, which made the score 13–3 in favor of Michigan at half-time. Indiana opened the scoring in the second half via an eight-yard touchdown run from Morgan Ellison. Michigan extended its lead in the fourth quarter via a 59-yard touchdown run from Higdon. Indiana responded with ten points in the fourth quarter via an eight-yard touchdown pass from Peyton Ramsey to Whop Philyor, and a field goal from Oakes as time expired to tie the game and force overtime. In overtime, Michigan scored via a 25-yard touchdown run from Higdon to win the game.

The win marked Michigan's 500th in Big Ten conference play, becoming the first Big Ten team to reach the milestone.

=== at Penn State ===
Michigan at Penn State

Team	1	2	3	4	Total
No. 19 Wolverines	0	13	0	0	13
• No. 2 Nittany Lions	14	7	7	14	42

- Date: October 21
- Location: Beaver Stadium
  University Park, PA
- Game start: 7:42 pm EDT
- Elapsed time: 3:16
- Game attendance: 110,823
- Game weather: 70–55, Mostly sunny, NW 0–3 MPH
- Referee: Jerry McGin
- TV announcers (ABC): Chris Fowler, Kirk Herbstreit, Maria Taylor and Tom Rinaldi

Scoring summary
1	14:17	PSU	Saquon Barkley 69-yard run (Tyler Davis kick)	PSU 7–0
1	10:11	PSU	Saquon Barkley 15-yard run (Tyler Davis kick)	PSU 14–0
2	12:53	MICH	Karan Higdon 1-yard run (Quinn Nordin PAT failed)	PSU 14–6
2	1:45	MICH	Ty Isaac 6-yard run (Quinn Nordin kick)	PSU 14–13
2	0:53	PSU	Trace McSorley 3-yard run (Tyler Davis kick)	PSU 21–13
3	5:13	PSU	Trace McSorley 13-yard run (Tyler Davis kick)	PSU 28–13
4	13:11	PSU	Saquon Barkley 42-yard pass from Trace McSorley (Tyler Davis kick)	PSU 35–13
4	7:53	PSU	Trace McSorley 9-yard run (Tyler Davis kick)	PSU 42–13

Following its clash with Indiana, Michigan traveled to University Park, Pennsylvania to face the Penn State Nittany Lions. A group of Penn State students caused controversy when it displayed a sign saying Michigan's quarterbacks are worse than the Flint water crisis. Penn State's administration has since denounced the students' actions.

Michigan lost to Penn State 42–13. Penn State scored 14 points in the first quarter via two touchdown runs from Saquon Barkley, from 69 yards and 15 yards, respectively. Michigan responded with 13 points in the second quarter via a one-yard touchdown run from Karan Higdon, and a six-yard touchdown run from Ty Isaac, to reduce the Nittany Lions' lead to one point. Penn State extended its lead in the second quarter via a three-yard touchdown run from Trace McSorley, which made the score 21–13 in favor of Penn State at half-time. Penn State then scored 21 unanswered points in the second half via a 13-yard touchdown run from McSorley in the third quarter, and a 42-yard touchdown pass from McSorley to Barkley and a nine-yard touchdown run from McSorley in the fourth quarter.

=== vs. Rutgers ===
Rutgers at Michigan
(Homecoming game)

Team	1	2	3	4	Total
Scarlet Knights	0	7	7	0	14
• Wolverines	0	21	7	7	35

- Date: October 28
- Location: Michigan Stadium
  Ann Arbor, MI
- Game start: 12:01 pm EDT
- Elapsed time: 3:02
- Game attendance: 111,213
- Game weather: Low 40s, Partly cloudy, SW 10–15 MPH
- Referee: Ron Snodgrass
- TV announcers (BTN): Kevin Kugler, Matt Millen and Elise Menaker

Scoring summary
2	12:06	MICH	Khalid Hill 1-yard run (Quinn Nordin kick)	MICH 7–0
2	10:52	RU	Janarion Grant 65-yard run (Andrew Harte kick)	Tie 7–7
2	2:49	MICH	Karan Higdon 10-yard run (Quinn Nordin kick)	MICH 14–7
2	0:23	MICH	Chris Evans 20-yard pass from Brandon Peters (Quinn Nordin kick)	MICH 21–7
3	11:30	MICH	Kareem Walker 5-yard run (Quinn Nordin kick)	MICH 28–7
3	7:01	RU	Gus Edwards 2-yard run (Andrew Harte kick)	MICH 28–14
4	14:10	MICH	Karan Higdon 49-yard run (Quinn Nordin kick)	MICH 35–14

After its game against Penn State, Michigan faced the Rutgers Scarlet Knights in Michigan's homecoming game. Michigan had demolished Rutgers in the previous meeting 78–0.

Michigan defeated the Scarlet Knights 35–14. After neither team scored in the first quarter, Michigan opened the scoring in the second quarter via a one-yard touchdown run from Khalid Hill. Rutgers responded with a 65-yard touchdown run from Janarion Grant to tie the game. Michigan responded with a 10-yard touchdown run from Karan Higdon, and a 20-yard touchdown pass from Brandon Peters to Chris Evans, which made the score 21–7 in favor of Michigan at half-time. The teams exchanged touchdowns in the third quarter via a five-yard touchdown run from Kareem Walker for Michigan, and a two-yard touchdown run from Gus Edwards for Rutgers. Michigan extended its lead in the fourth quarter via a 49-yard touchdown run from Higdon.

Michigan's 334 rushing yards were its most since recording 481 rushing yards at Rutgers last season, while its 471 total yards was a season-high, and the most since recording 660 total yards the previous season against Maryland. Karan Higdon and Ty Isaac both surpassed 100-yards rushing, marking the 40th time in program history that Michigan had a pair of 100-yard rushers. The last time Michigan accomplished the feat was last year against Rutgers. Michigan tied a season-high with 11 tackles-for-loss.

=== vs. Minnesota ===
Minnesota at Michigan
(Little Brown Jug)

Team	1	2	3	4	Total
Golden Gophers	7	0	0	3	10
• Wolverines	13	7	13	0	33

- Date: November 4
- Location: Michigan Stadium
  Ann Arbor, MI
- Game start: 8:31 pm EDT
- Elapsed time: 3:08
- Game attendance: 111,090
- Game weather: High 40s, Cloudy with rain, NE 10–15 MPH
- Referee: Daniel Capron
- TV announcers (Fox): Tim Brando, Spencer Tillman, and Holly Sonders

Scoring summary
1	7:43	MICH	Sean McKeon 20-yard pass from Brandon Peters (Quinn Nordin kick)	MICH 7–0
1	1:24	MINN	Rodney Smith 10-yard run (Emmit Carpenter kick)	Tie 7–7
1	0:58	MICH	Karan Higdon 77-yard run (Quinn Nordin kick failed)	MICH 13–7
2	7:00	MICH	Chris Evans 60-yard run (Quinn Nordin kick)	MICH 20–7
3	3:27	MICH	Karan Higdon 5-yard run (Quinn Nordin kick)	MICH 27–7
3	1:35	MICH	Chris Evans 67-yard run (Chris Evans rush failed)	MICH 33–7
4	1:51	MINN	Emmit Carpenter 23-yard field goal	MICH 33–10

After facing Rutgers, Michigan will host the Minnesota Golden Gophers for the Little Brown Jug. In the previous meeting (in 2015), Michigan defeated Minnesota, 29–26.

Michigan defeated Minnesota 33–10. Michigan opened the scoring in the first quarter via a 20-yard touchdown pass from Brandon Peters to Sean McKeon. Minnesota responded with a 10-yard touchdown run from Rodney Smith to tie the game. Michigan regained the lead via a 77-yard touchdown run from Karan Higdon. Michigan extended its lead in the second quarter via a 60-yard touchdown run from Chris Evans, which made the score 20–7 in favor of Michigan at half-time. Michigan added 13 points in the third quarter via a five-yard touchdown run from Higdon, and a 67-touchdown run from Evans. Minnesota responded with a 23-yard field goal from Emmit Carpenter in the fourth quarter.

With Karan Higdon rushing for 200 yards, and Chris Evans rushing for 191 yards, Michigan had a pair of 100-yard rushers in consecutive games for the first time since 1975. Karan Higdon recorded his second 200-yard game of the season, becoming the first Michigan running back to record multiple 200-yard games in the same season since Mike Hart in 2004. Khaleke Hudson's eight tackles-for-loss broke the single game franchise record, surpassing the previous record of seven set by Larry Foote at Iowa in 2001.

=== at Maryland ===
Michigan at Maryland

Team	1	2	3	4	Total
• No. 21 Wolverines	7	21	0	7	35
Terrapins	0	0	3	7	10

- Date: November 11
- Location: Maryland Stadium
  College Park, MD
- Game start: 3:40 pm EST
- Elapsed time: 3:15
- Game attendance: 44,325
- Referee: Jeff Servinsky
- TV announcers (BTN): Brandon Gaudin, Glen Mason and Elise Menaker

Scoring summary
1	6:11	MICH	Henry Poggi 2-yard run (Quinn Nordin kick)	MICH 7–0
2	12:21	MICH	Chris Evans 1-yard run (Quinn Nordin kick)	MICH 14–0
2	11:21	MICH	Zach Gentry 33-yard pass from Brandon Peters (Quinn Nordin kick)	MICH 21–0
2	8:21	MICH	Sean McKeon 3-yard pass from Brandon Peters (Quinn Nordin kick)	MICH 28–0
3	0:19	UMD	Henry Darmstadter 20-yard field goal	MICH 28–3
4	9:46	UMD	Tavion Jacobs 10-yard pass from Ryan Brand (Henry Darmstadter kick)	MICH 28–10
4	4:55	MICH	Chris Evans 17-yard run (Quinn Nordin kick)	MICH 35–10

After hosting Minnesota, Michigan traveled to College Park, Maryland to face the Maryland Terrapins.

Michigan defeated Maryland 35–10. Michigan opened the scoring in the first quarter via a two-yard touchdown run from Henry Poggi. Michigan added 21 points in the second quarter via a one-yard touchdown run from Chris Evans, a 33-yard touchdown pass from Brandon Peters to Zach Gentry, and a three-yard touchdown pass from Peters to Sean McKeon, which made the score 28–0 in favor of Michigan at half-time. Maryland opened the scoring in the second half via a 20-yard field goal from Henry Darmstadter. The teams exchanged touchdowns in the fourth quarter via a 10-yard touchdown pass from Ryan Brand to Tavion Jacobs for Maryland, and a 17-yard touchdown run from Evans for Michigan.

With Chris Evans surpassing the 500-yard rushing mark for the season, he joined Ty Isaac and Karan Higdon to give Michigan three running backs with at least 500 rushing yards on the season for the first time since 1991.

=== at Wisconsin ===
Michigan at Wisconsin

Team	1	2	3	4	Total
No. 19 Wolverines	0	7	3	0	10
• No. 5 Badgers	7	0	14	3	24

- Date: November 18
- Location: Camp Randall Stadium
  Madison, WI
- Game start: 12:05 pm EST
- Elapsed time: 3:30
- Game attendance: 81,216
- Game weather: 37º F, Cloudy, N 14 MPH
- Referee: M. Cannon
- TV announcers (Fox): Gus Johnson, Joel Klatt and Jenny Taft

Scoring summary
1	1:15	WIS	Nick Nelson 50-yard punt return (Rafael Gaglianone kick)	WIS 7–0
2	2:24	MICH	Ben Mason 1-yard run (Quinn Nordin kick)	Tie 7–7
3	6:36	MICH	Quinn Nordin 39-yard field goal	MICH 10–7
3	3:31	WIS	A. J. Taylor 24-yard pass from Alex Hornibrook (Rafael Gaglianone kick)	WIS 14–10
3	0:24	WIS	Kendric Pryor 32-yard run (Rafael Gaglianone kick)	WIS 21–10
4	2:25	WIS	Rafael Gaglianone 30-yard field goal	WIS 24–10

Following its game against Maryland, Michigan played its final road game against the Wisconsin Badgers. Michigan defeated the Badgers in a top 10 showdown during the prior meeting, winning 14–7.

Michigan lost to Wisconsin 24–10. Wisconsin opened the scoring in the first quarter via a 50-yard punt return from Nick Nelson. Michigan responded with a one-yard touchdown run from Ben Mason in the second quarter to tie the game at half-time. Michigan opened the scoring in the second half via a 39-yard field goal from Quinn Nordin, to take its first lead of the game. Wisconsin responded with 14 points in the third quarter via a 24-yard touchdown pass from Alex Hornibrook to A. J. Taylor, and a 32-yard touchdown run from Kendric Pryor. Wisconsin extended its lead in the fourth quarter via a 30-yard field goal from Rafael Gaglianone.

Michigan's defense held Wisconsin to just 5-of-15 on third down conversions. Michigan's offense averaged 207.8 rushing yards per game coming into the game.

=== vs. Ohio State ===
Ohio State at Michigan
(The Game)

Team	1	2	3	4	Total
• No. 8 Buckeyes	0	14	7	10	31
Wolverines	7	7	6	0	20

- Date: November 25
- Location: Michigan Stadium
  Ann Arbor, MI
- Game start: 12:05 pm EST
- Elapsed time: 3:42
- Game attendance: 112,028
- Game weather: Mid 40s, Party cloudy, NE 15–20 MPH
- Referee: Ron Snodgrass
- TV announcers (Fox): Gus Johnson, Joel Klatt and Jenny Taft

Scoring summary
1	6:02	MICH	Khalid Hill 2-yard run (Quinn Nordin kick)	MICH 7–0
2	14:57	MICH	Sean McKeon 3-yard pass from John O'Korn (Quinn Nordin kick)	MICH 14–0
2	9:50	OSU	J. T. Barrett 21-yard run (Sean Nuernberger kick)	MICH 14–7
2	5:54	OSU	Marcus Baugh 25-yard pass from J. T. Barrett (Sean Nuernberger kick)	Tie 14–14
3	7:07	MICH	Karan Higdon 2-yard run (Quinn Nordin kick blocked)	MICH 20–14
3	1:34	OSU	J. K. Dobbins 1-yard run (Sean Nuernberger kick)	OSU 21–20
4	10:21	OSU	Sean Nuernberger 44-yard field goal	OSU 24–20
4	1:44	OSU	Mike Weber 25-yard run (Sean Nuernberger kick)	OSU 31–20

Following its road finale against Wisconsin, Michigan hosted its arch-rivals, the Ohio State Buckeyes, in the 114th meeting of "The Game".

Michigan lost to Ohio State 31–20. Michigan opened the scoring in the first quarter via a two-yard touchdown run from Khalid Hill. Michigan extended its lead in the second quarter via a three-yard touchdown pass from John O'Korn to Sean McKeon. Ohio State responded with 14 points in the second quarter via a 21-yard touchdown run from J. T. Barrett, and a 25-yard touchdown pass from Barrett to Marcus Baugh to tie the game at half-time. Michigan regained the lead in the third quarter via a two-yard touchdown run from Karan Higdon. Ohio State responded with a one-yard touchdown run from J. K. Dobbins, giving Ohio State its first lead of the game. Ohio State scored 10 points in the fourth quarter via a 44-yard field goal from Sean Nuernberger, and a 25-yard touchdown run from Mike Weber.

Michigan's honorary captains for the game was former Wolverine and 1997 Heisman winner Charles Woodson, and alumnus Dao-Yi Chao, creative director and co-founder of Public School New York (PSNY). Senior left tackle and offensive captain Mason Cole made his 50th consecutive start on the offensive line for the Wolverines, tying him with Jon Jansen (1995–98) for most in program history among offensive linemen. Michigan's defense held Ohio State to minus-six yards of offense in the first quarter, marking the first full quarter in negative yardage for the Buckeyes since 2010. The first play during each of Ohio State's first three possessions resulted in a Michigan tackle for loss.

=== vs. South Carolina ===
Michigan vs. South Carolina
(Outback Bowl)

Team	1	2	3	4	Total
Wolverines	6	3	10	0	19
• Gamecocks	0	3	13	10	26

- Date: January 1
- Location: Raymond James Stadium
  Tampa,. FL
- Game start: 12:00 pm EST
- Elapsed time: 3:44
- Game attendance: 45,687
- Game weather: 56º F, Cloudy, Light rain, N 11 MPH
- Referee: Stuart Mullins
- TV announcers (ESPN2): Adam Amin, Dusty Dvoracek, and Molly McGrath

Scoring summary
1	3:42	MICH	Quinn Nordin 35-yard field goal	MICH 3–0
1	0:09	MICH	Quinn Nordin 26-yard field goal	MICH 6–0
2	8:45	USC	Parker White 44-yard field goal	MICH 6–3
2	0:00	MICH	Quinn Nordin 45-yard field goal	MICH 9–3
3	9:56	MICH	Ben Mason 1-yard run (Quinn Nordin kick)	MICH 16–3
3	5:42	MICH	Quinn Nordin 48-yard field goal	MICH 19–3
3	2:25	USC	Rico Dowdle 17-yard run (Jake Bentley pass failed)	MICH 19–9
3	0:51	USC	Bryan Edwards 21-yard pass from Jake Bentley (Parker White kick)	MICH 19–16
4	11:33	USC	Shi Smith 53-yard pass from Jake Bentley (Parker White kick)	SC 23–19
4	3:47	USC	Parker White 22-yard field goal	SC 26–19

On December 3, Michigan was selected to play in the Outback Bowl against the South Carolina Gamecocks. Michigan lost the previous meeting in the 2013 Outback Bowl, by a score of 33–28. This was Michigan's 46th bowl game appearance, and sixth appearance in the Outback Bowl.

Michigan lost to South Carolina 26–19, becoming the only team in the Big Ten Conference to lose its bowl game in the 2017–2018 bowl season. Michigan scored six points in the first quarter via two field goals from Quinn Nordin, from 35-yards, and 26-yards, respectively. The teams exchanged field goals in the second quarter, one from Parker White from 44-yards for South Carolina, and one from Nordin from 45-yards for Michigan, which made the score 9–3 in favor of Michigan at half-time. Michigan scored 10 points in the third quarter via a one-yard touchdown run from Ben Mason, and a 48-yard field goal from Nordin. South Carolina responded with 23 straight points in the second half via a 17-yard touchdown run from Rico Dowdle and a 21-yard touchdown pass from Jake Bentley to Bryan Edwards in the third quarter. South Carolina took its first lead of the game in the fourth quarter via a 53-yard touchdown pass from Bentley to Shi Smith, and extended its lead via a 22-yard field goal from White.

Michigan's defense held South Carolina to 2-of-14 on third-down conversions, as the Gamecocks did not convert their first third-down opportunity until fewer than five minutes remained in the third quarter.

== Roster ==
2017 Michigan Wolverines football team roster
Players
Coaches
Offense

Pos.	#	Name	Class
QB	5	Joe Milton	Fr
WR	2	Oliver Martin	Fr
CB	6	Myles Sims	Fr
WR	4	Nico Collins	Fr
RB	5	Kurt Taylor	Fr
QB	6	Michael Sessa	RFr
RB	6	Kareem Walker	RFr
WR	7	Tarik Black	Fr
QB	8	John O'Korn	RSr
WR	9	Donovan Peoples-Jones	Fr
QB	10	Dylan McCaffery	Fr
RB	12	Chris Evans	So
WR	13	Eddie McDoom	So
QB	15	Garrett Moores	RSr
QB	15	Alex Malzone	Jr
WR	16	Jack Wangler	RSr
TE	17	Tyrone Wheatley Jr.	RSo
QB	18	Brandon Peters	RFr
FB	19	Henry Poggi	RSr
RB	20	Tru Wilson	RFr
RB	22	Karan Higdon	Jr
RB	23	O'Maury Samuels	Fr
WR	24	Jake Martin	RFr
RB	27	Joe Hewlett	Sr
WR	28	Austin Brenner	RFr
WR	29	Brendan White	Jr
FB	30	Joe Beneducci	Sr
RB	32	Ty Isaac	RSr
TE	34	Kenneth Ferris	Jr
FB	35	Brian Chu	Sr
WR	35	Nate Schoenle	RFr
FB	39	Spencer Dickow	Jr
FB	40	Nick Volk	Sr
FB	41	Michael Hirsch	Sr
FB	42	Ben Mason	Fr
TE	42	Ryan Files	Jr
RB	44	Jared Char	Fr
FB	45	Travis Dantzer	Fr
FB	49	Tyler Plocki	Fr
OL	50	Michael Onwenu	So
OL	51	Cesar Ruiz	Fr
OL	52	Mason Cole	Sr
OL	57	Patrick Kugler	RSr
OL	59	Joel Honigford	Fr
OL	61	Dane Jokisch	RFr
OL	63	Sean Fitzgerald	Fr
OL	65	Anthony Kay	Fr
OL	66	Chuck Filiaga	Fr
OL	67	Jess Speight	Fr
OL	68	Andrew Vastardis	RFr
OL	70	Nolan Ulizio	So
OL	71	Andrew Stueber	Fr
OL	72	Stephen Spanellis	RFr
OL	73	JaRaymond Hall	Fr
OL	74	Ben Bredeson	So
OL	75	Jon Runyan Jr.	RSo
OL	76	Juwann Bushell-Beatty	RJr
OL	77	Grant Newsome	RSo
OL	79	Greg Robinson	RFr
TE	80	Khalid Hill	RSr
TE	82	Nick Eubanks	RFr
TE	83	Zach Gentry	RSo
TE	84	Sean McKeon	So
WR	85	Maurice Ways	RJr
TE	86	Conner Edmonds	RFr
WR	88	Grant Perry	Jr
TE	89	Ian Bunting	RJr
TE	92	Carter Selzer	Fr
TE	99	Ryan Veingrad	Fr

Defense

Pos.	#	Name	Class
LB	1	Jordan Anthony	Fr
DE	2	Carlo Kemp	So
DE	3	Rashan Gary	So
DE	4	Reuben Jones	RSo
DT	5	Aubrey Solomon	Fr
S	7	Khaleke Hudson	So
LB	8	Drew Singleton	Fr
LB	9	Mike McCray	RSr
LB	10	Devin Bush Jr.	So
LB	12	Josh Ross	Fr
CB	12	Drake Harris	RJr
CB	13	Ambry Thomas	Fr
S	14	Josh Metellus	So
DE	15	Chase Winovich	RJr
S	16	Jaylen Kelly-Powell	Fr
CB	17	Nate Johnson	So
DE	18	Luiji Vilain	Fr
DE	19	Kwity Paye	Fr
CB	20	Matt Mitchell	Sr
S	20	Brad Hawkins	Fr
CB	22	David Long	RFr
DB	23	Tyree Kinnel	Jr
CB	24	Lavert Hill	So
CB	25	Benjamin St-Juste	Fr
S	26	J'Marick Woods	Fr
CB	27	Hunter Reynolds	Fr
CB	28	Brandon Watson	RJr
S	29	Jordan Glasgow	Jr
S	30	Tyler Cochran	RFr
DT	31	Phillip Paea	Fr
DB	32	Louis Grodman	Jr
LB	35	Josh Uche	RFr
LB	36	Devin Gil	RFr
DB	36	Taylor Krupp	Jr
LB	38	Jared Wangler	RJr
S	43	Jacob West	Jr
DT	44	Deron Irving-Bey	Fr
LB	44	Adam Shibley	Fr
LB	46	Michael Wroblewski	RSr
DT	50	Michael Dwumfour	RFr
LB	51	Peter Bush	RFr
LB	52	Elysee Mbem-Bosse	RFr
DT	53	Salim Makki	Sr
LB	54	Adam Fakih	Fr
DL	55	James Hudson	Fr
LB	56	Jameson Offerdahl	Jr
LB	58	Alex Kaminski	Sr
LB	59	Noah Furbush	RJr
DT	72	Carl Myers	RFr
DT	73	Maurice Hurst Jr.	RSr
LB	82	Dane Drobocky	RFr
LB	88	Carter Dunaway	Jr
DT	90	Bryan Mone	Sr
DE	92	Cheyenn Robertson	Jr
DT	93	Lawrence Marshall	RJr
DL	95	Donovan Jeter	Fr
DT	97	Ron Johnson	RFr
DE	99	John Luby	Fr

Special teams

Pos.	#	Name	Class
P	3	Brad Robbins	Fr
K/P	5	Kyle Seychel	So
K/P	15	Quinn Nordin	RFr
P	17	Will Hart	RFr
K	31	James Foug	Jr
LS	38	Camaron Cheeseman	So
LS	38	Bradley Deeg	Jr
K/P	41	Ryan Tice	RSo
LS	50	Andrew Robinson	Sr

Head coach

- Jim Harbaugh

Coordinators/assistant coaches

- Tim Drevno (offensive coordinator / offensive line)
- Don Brown (defensive coordinator)
- Pep Hamilton (assistant head coach / passing game coordinator)
- Jay Harbaugh (running backs / co-special teams coordinator)
- Brian Smith (defensive backs)
- Greg Mattison (defensive line)
- Kevin Tolbert (strength and conditioning)
- Mike Zordich (secondary / special teams)
- Chris Partridge (linebackers / special teams)
- Greg Frey (offensive tackles / tight ends / run game coordinator)
- Al Netter (offensive graduate assistant)
- Ryan Nehlen (offensive graduate assistant)
- Drew Terrell (offensive graduate assistant)
- Joe Hastings (defensive graduate assistant)

Legend

- (C) Team captain
- (S) Suspended
- (I) Ineligible
- Injured
- Redshirt

Roster
Last update: May 5, 2017

== Awards and honors ==
Weekly Awards
Player	Award	Date Awarded	Ref.
Quinn Nordin	Co-Big Ten Special Teams Player of the Week	September 4, 2017	
Tyree Kinnel	Big Ten Defensive Player of the Week	September 11, 2017	
Chase Winovich	Co-Big Ten Defensive Player of the Week; Walter Camp FBS Player of the Week	September 25, 2017	
Chris Evans	Co-Big Ten Offensive Player of the Week	November 6, 2017	
Karan Higdon	Co-Big Ten Offensive Player of the Week	November 6, 2017	
Khaleke Hudson	Co-Big Ten Defensive Player of the Week; Bronko Nagurski National Defensive Player of the Week	November 7, 2017	

All-American
Player	AP	AFCA	FWAA	TSN	WCFF	Designation
Devin Bush Jr.	3				2	None
Maurice Hurst Jr.	1	2	2	1	2	Consensus
The NCAA recognizes a selection to all five of the AP, AFCA, FWAA, TSN and WCFF first teams for unanimous selections and three of five for consensus selections.

All-Big Ten
Player	Position	Coaches	Media
Maurice Hurst Jr.	DT	1	1
Devin Bush Jr.	LB	1	2
Rashan Gary	DL	1	2
Chase Winovich	DL	2	1
Ben Bredeson	OG	2	2
Mason Cole	C	2	2
Lavert Hill	DB	2	Hon.
Khaleke Hudson	LB	3	2
Karan Higdon	RB	3	3
Chris Evans	RB	Hon.	Hon.
Tyree Kinnel	DB	Hon.	Hon.
Mike McCray	LB	Hon.	Hon.
Josh Metellus	DB	Hon.	Hon.
Quinn Nordin	K	Hon.	Hon.
Brad Robbins	P	Hon.	–
Zach Gentry	TE	–	Hon.
Patrick Kugler	OL	–	Hon.
David Long	CB	–	Hon.
Sean McKeon	TE	–	Hon.
Donovan Peoples-Jones	PR	–	Hon.
Hon. = Honorable mention. Reference:

== Radio ==
Radio coverage for all games was broadcast statewide on The Michigan IMG Sports Network and on Sirius XM Satellite Radio. The radio announcers were Jim Brandstatter (in his final season with the team) with play-by-play, Dan Dierdorf with color commentary, and Doug Karsch with sideline reports.

== 2018 NFL draft ==
Rnd.	Pick	Team	Player	Pos.	College	Notes
3*	97	Arizona Cardinals	Mason Cole	C	Michigan	
5	140	Oakland Raiders	Maurice Hurst Jr.	DT	Michigan	
