= Cowboys Kickoff Classic =

Former annual college football game in Texas

- Logo for the 2019 Advocare Classic (logo changed annually with each game)
- Stadium: AT&T Stadium
- Location: Arlington, Texas
- Operated: 2009–2019, 2021

Sponsors
- Dick's Sporting Goods (2009) Advocare (2015–2019) Allstate (2021)

Former names
- Cowboys Classic (2009–2014) Advocare Classic (2015–2019) Allstate Kickoff Classic (2021)

The Cowboys Kickoff Classic was an annual college football game played on the opening weekend of the college football season. It was played in Arlington, Texas, at AT&T Stadium, home of the Dallas Cowboys from 2009 to 2021. The game was originally known as the Cowboys Classic from 2009 to 2014, Advocare Classic from 2015 to 2019, and Allstate Kickoff Classic in 2021. No game was scheduled for 2022 onward.

== Game results ==
Season	Date	Winners		Runners-up		Attendance	TV
2009	September 5, 2009	20 BYU Cougars	14	3 Oklahoma Sooners	13	75,437	ESPN
2010	September 4, 2010	6 TCU Horned Frogs	30	24 Oregon State Beavers	21	46,138	ESPN
2011	September 3, 2011	4 LSU Tigers	40	3 Oregon Ducks	27	87,711	ABC
2012	September 1, 2012	2 Alabama Crimson Tide	41	8 Michigan Wolverines	14	90,413	ABC
2013	August 31, 2013	12 LSU Tigers	37	20 TCU Horned Frogs	27	80,230	ESPN
2014	August 30, 2014	1 Florida State Seminoles	37	Oklahoma State Cowboys	31	61,521	ABC
2015	September 5, 2015	3 Alabama Crimson Tide	35	20 Wisconsin Badgers	17	64,279	ABC
2016	September 3, 2016	1 Alabama Crimson Tide	52	20 USC Trojans	6	81,359	ABC
2017	September 2, 2017	11 Michigan Wolverines	33	17 Florida Gators	17	75,802	ABC
2018	September 2, 2018	25 LSU Tigers	33	8 Miami Hurricanes	17	68,841	ABC
2019	August 31, 2019	16 Auburn Tigers	27	11 Oregon Ducks	21	60,662	ABC
2020	September 5, 2020	Game cancelled due to COVID-19 pandemic. Originally Alabama v USC.					
2021	September 4, 2021	Kansas State Wildcats	24	Stanford Cardinal	7	28,668	FS1

Rankings are from the AP Poll.

== Game summaries ==
=== 2009 ===
Founded as the Cowboys Classic, the 2009 game featured the No. 20 BYU Cougars of the Mountain West Conference (MWC) against the No. 3 Oklahoma Sooners of the Big 12 Conference and was played on September 5, 2009. It was the first college football game played at Cowboys Stadium. The game was only the second game played by BYU and Oklahoma, with the Cougars upsetting the Sooners 14–13.

=== 2010 ===
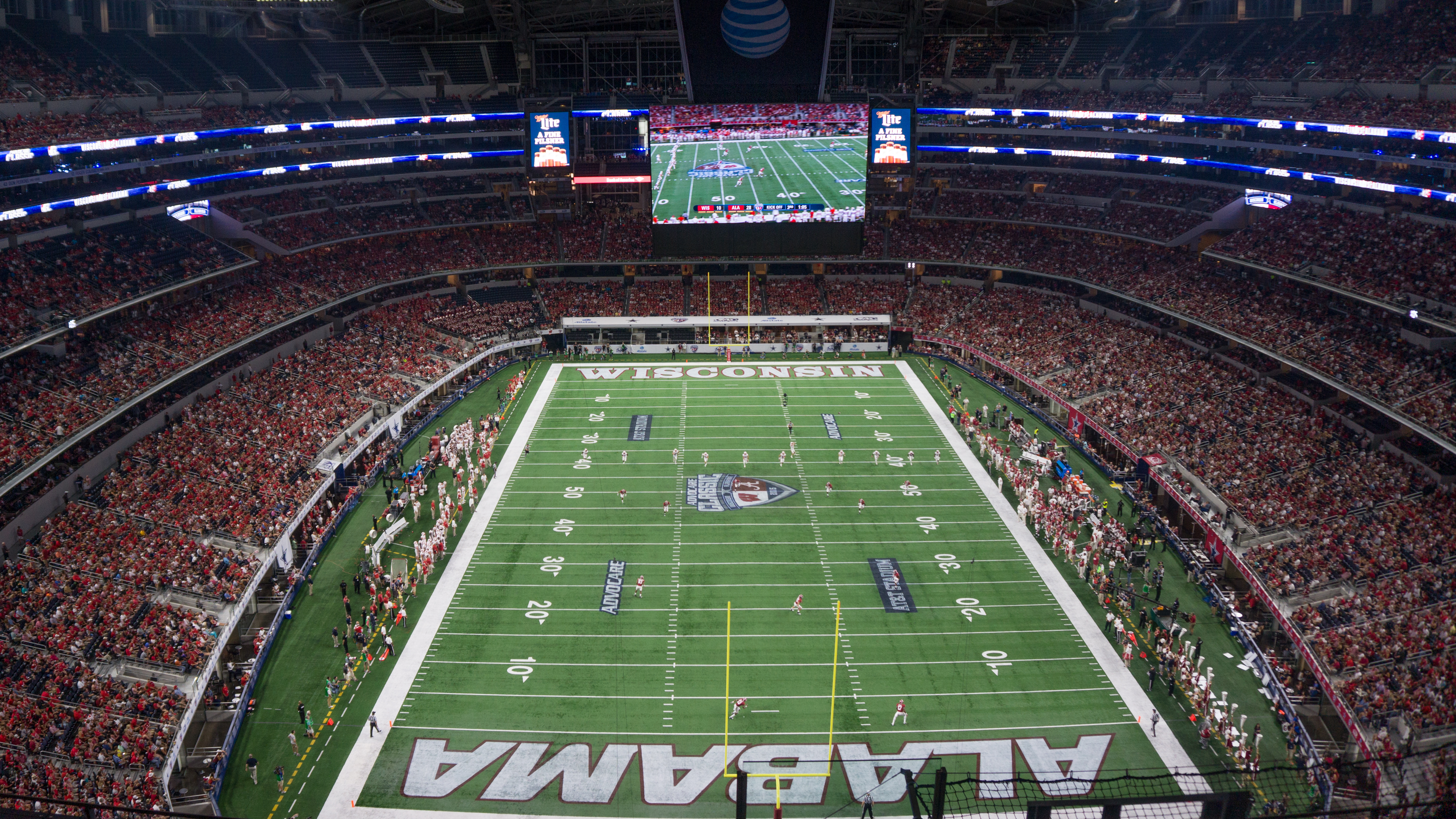
Opening kickoff of the 2015 Advocare Classic between Alabama and Wisconsin

The second Cowboys Classic matched the No. 24 Oregon State Beavers of the Pac-12 Conference and the No. 5 TCU Horned Frogs of the Mountain West Conference (MWC) on September 4, 2010. The Horned Frogs defeated the Beavers 30–21 in front of series low crowd of 46,138.

=== 2011 ===
The third edition paired the No. 4 Oregon Ducks of the Pac-12 Conference against the No. 3 LSU Tigers of the Southeastern Conference (SEC) and was played on September 3, 2011, with the Tigers winning 40–27.

=== 2012 ===
No. 8 Michigan Wolverines of the Big Ten Conference played No. 2 Alabama Crimson Tide of the Southeastern Conference (SEC) on September 1, 2012, the first regular-season meeting between the teams. Alabama won 41–14 in front of an event record attendance of 90,413.

=== 2013 ===
The fifth playing of the Cowboys Classic matched the No. 12 LSU Tigers of the Southeastern Conference (SEC) and the No. 20 TCU Horned Frogs of the Big 12 Conference and was played on August 31, 2013. The Tigers beat the Horned Frogs 37–27.

=== 2014 ===
The sixth edition featured the Florida State Seminoles of the Atlantic Coast Conference (ACC) and the Oklahoma State Cowboys of the Big 12 Conference, and was played on August 30, 2014 at AT&T Stadium in Arlington, Texas. It was the fifth meeting between Florida State and Oklahoma State, with the Seminoles leading the series 3–1. The No. 1 Seminoles defeated the unranked Cowboys 37–31 in front of a crowd of 62,521.

=== 2015 ===
The seventh edition of the Advocare Classic (and the first with Advocare as title sponsor) featured the Alabama Crimson Tide of the Southeastern Conference (SEC) and the Wisconsin Badgers of the Big Ten Conference, and was played on September 5 at AT&T Stadium in Arlington. En route to a national championship, Alabama won their season opener over Wisconsin by a score of 35–17, with eventual Heisman Trophy winner Derrick Henry rushing for 147 yards and three touchdowns. It was the second overall meeting between Alabama and Wisconsin.

=== 2016 ===
The eighth edition of the classic (and the second with Advocare sponsoring the event) featured the top-ranked Alabama Crimson Tide of the Southeastern Conference (SEC) and the #20 USC Trojans of the Pac-12 Conference, played September 3 at AT&T Stadium. The Crimson Tide routed the Trojans 52–6 in front of an announced attendance of 81,359.

=== 2017 ===
The ninth edition of the Advocare classic featured the Michigan Wolverines of the Big Ten Conference versus the Florida Gators of the Southeastern Conference (SEC), played September 2 at AT&T Stadium. It was the fourth meeting between Michigan and Florida (Michigan leads 3–0), and the first ever regular season meeting between the teams. The Wolverines won the game 33–17.

=== 2018 ===
The tenth edition of the Advocare classic featured #25 LSU Tigers of the Southeastern Conference (SEC) against the #8 Miami Hurricanes of the Atlantic Coast Conference (ACC), played September 2 at AT&T Stadium. It was the thirteenth meeting between Miami and LSU (LSU leads 10–3), and their first meeting since the 2005 Peach Bowl. LSU won the game 33–17.

=== 2019 ===
The eleventh edition of the Advocare Classic featured the #11 Oregon Ducks of the Pac-12 Conference against the #16 Auburn Tigers of the Southeastern Conference (SEC), played August 31 at AT&T Stadium. It was the second meeting between Oregon and Auburn (Auburn leads 1–0), and their first meeting since the 2011 BCS National Championship Game. After being down by 15 in the third quarter, Auburn came from behind to win 27–21, scoring the winning touchdown with 9 seconds remaining.

=== 2021 ===
After missing 2020 due to the COVID-19 pandemic, the game was played again in 2021 between Stanford and Kansas State. The Wichita Eagle reported that the stadium attendance of 28,668 was mostly filled with Kansas State fans. The final score was Kansas State 24, Stanford 7.

== Records ==
=== By team ===
Rank	Team	Apps	Record	Win %
1	Alabama	3	3–0	1.000
1	LSU	3	3–0	1.000
3	Auburn	1	1–0	1.000
3	BYU	1	1–0	1.000
3	Florida State	1	1–0	1.000
3	Kansas State	1	1–0	1.000
6	Michigan	2	1–1	.500
6	TCU	2	1–1	.500
8	Florida	1	0–1	.000
8	Miami	1	0–1	.000
8	Oklahoma	1	0–1	.000
8	Oklahoma State	1	0–1	.000
8	Oregon State	1	0–1	.000
8	USC	1	0–1	.000
8	Wisconsin	1	0–1	.000
8	Stanford	1	0–1	.000
15	Oregon	2	0–2	.000

=== By conference ===
Rank	Conference	Apps	Record	Win %
1	SEC	8	7–1	.875
2	MW	2	2–0	1.000
3	ACC	2	1–1	.500
4	Big 12	4	1–3	.250
5	Big Ten	3	1–2	.333
6	Pac-12	5	0–5	.000
