= Quinn Nordin =

American football player (born 1998)

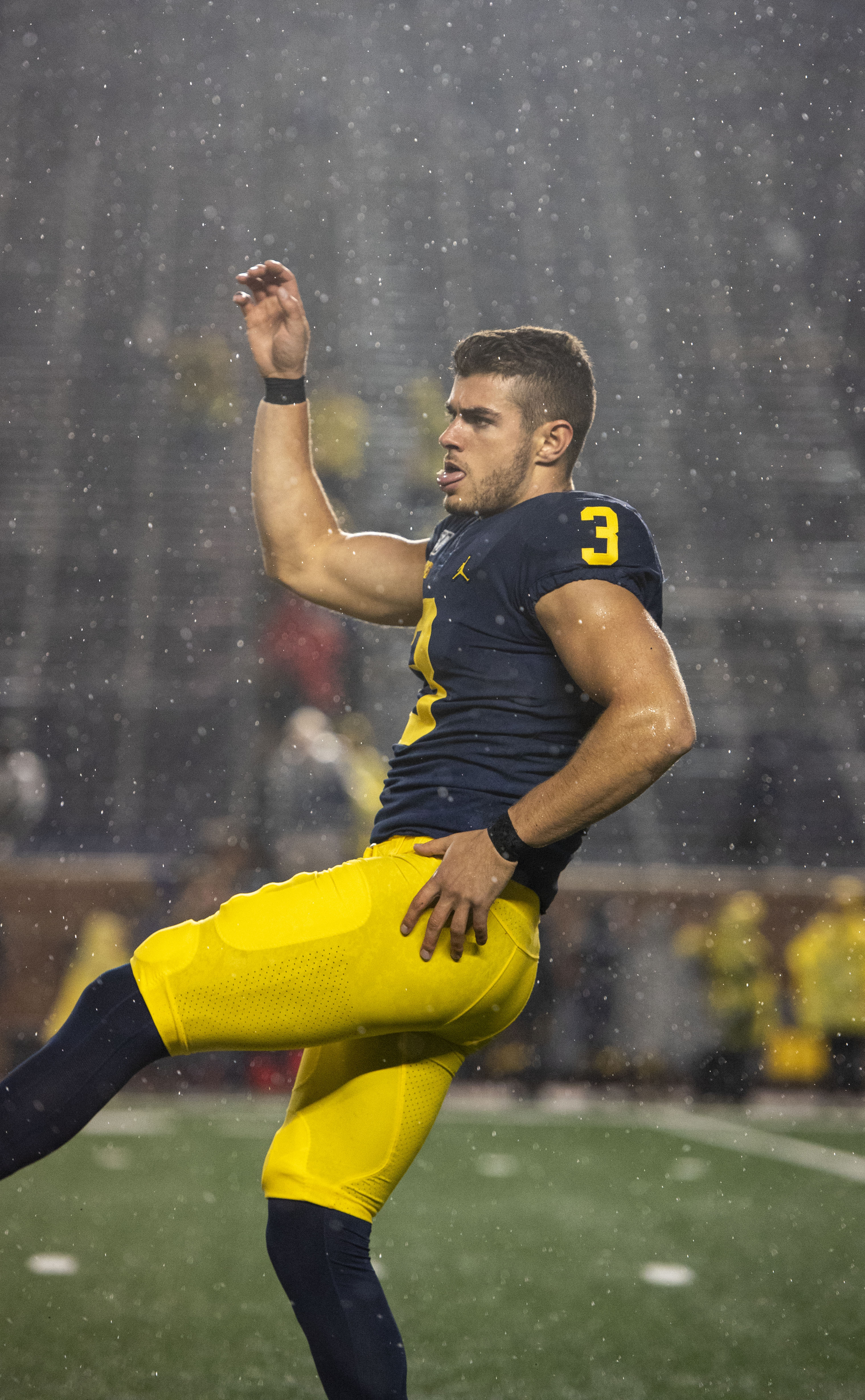
- Nordin with the Michigan Wolverines in 2019

Profile
- Position: Placekicker

Personal information
- Born: August 16, 1998 (age 28); Rockford, Michigan, U.S.
- Listed height: 6 ft 1 in (1.85 m)
- Listed weight: 189 lb (86 kg)

Career information
- High school: Rockford
- College: Michigan (2016–2020)
- NFL draft: 2021: undrafted

Career history
- New England Patriots (2021–2022)
- Stats at Pro Football Reference

Quinn Nordin (born August 16, 1998) is an American former professional football placekicker. He played college football at Michigan and signed with the New England Patriots as an undrafted free agent in 2021.

== Early life ==
Nordin played high school football at Rockford High School in Rockford, Michigan. Nordin missed much of his senior season due to a shoulder injury, but returned to action late for a Rockford team that made it to the third round of the Division-1 state playoffs with an 8–3 overall record. He converted two of three field goal attempts during his senior year with a long of 51 yards, landed seven punts inside the 20 yard line (while averaging 53 yards per punt), and landed 17 of 18 kickoffs in the endzone for touchbacks (the other was an onside kick). Following his senior season, Nordin was named USA Today High School All-American.

Nordin was listed as the nation's top kicker by Scout.com and the No. 9 overall kicker by ESPN. He was rated as a three-star prospect by both Rivals.com and ESPN.com. Nordin was verbally committed to Penn State in July 2015, but later withdrew his commitment. In January 2016, Nordin gained national attention when Michigan head coach Jim Harbaugh conducted a sleepover recruiting session at Nordin's house. On National Signing Day, February 3, 2016, Nordin committed to play college football for the Michigan Wolverines.

== College career ==
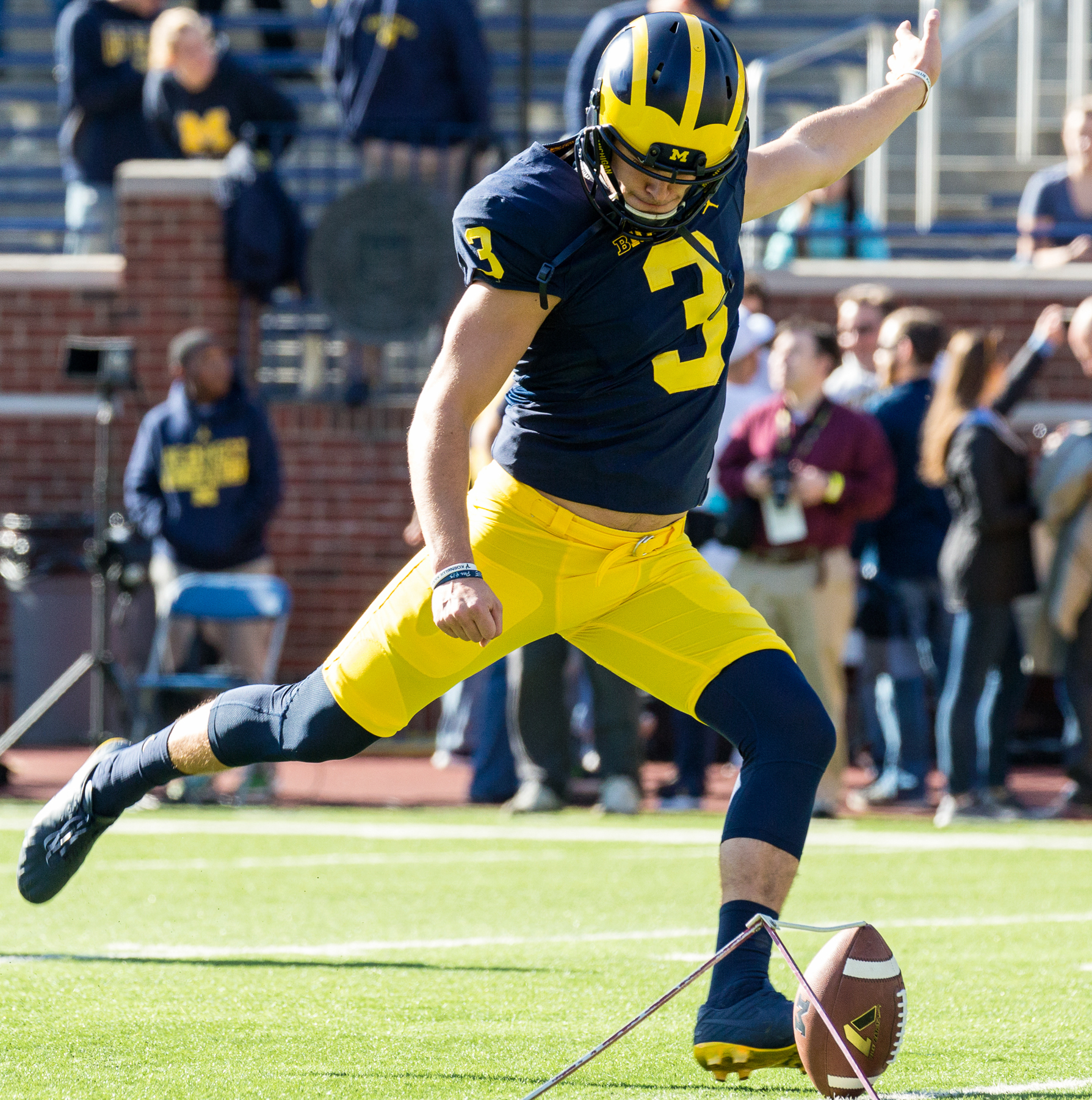
Nordin warming up for a game in 2016

On September 2, 2017, Nordin completed four field goals in his first collegiate start against Florida, including from 55 and 50 yards. He became the first Michigan kicker to hit multiple field goals of 50 yards or more in the same game. Just one game into his career, Nordin tied for third all-time at Michigan with two made field goals of 50 yards or longer. His 55-yard field goal marked the longest field goal in a collegiate game played at AT&T Stadium in Arlington, Texas, and the longest converted by a Michigan freshman. Following his outstanding performance, Nordin was named the Big Ten Co-Special Teams Player of the Week for the week ending September 4, 2017. On September 16 against Air Force, Nordin matched a Michigan record by going 5-for-5 on his field goal attempts. He also converted both of his point after attempts (PAT) giving him 17 points in the game, falling one short of the Michigan single-game scoring record for a kicker. For his performance, Nordin was named Big Ten Special Teams Player of the Week for the second time on September 18, 2017. Nordin missed his first PAT of the season on October 21, 2017, against the Penn State Nittany Lions.

During the 2018 season, Nordin appeared in the first 10 games of the season and completed 44 out of 45 PAT (0.978). However, he only connected on 11 out of 16 field goal attempts (0.688), and was 3 out of 7 (0.429) in his last four games.

During the 2019 season, Nordin shared the field goal and point after duties with sophomore kicker Jake Moody. He appeared in 9 games during the regular season, connecting on 27 out of 28 PAT (0.964) and 7 out of 10 field goals (.700). On January 1, 2020, Nordin converted a 57-yard field goal at the end of the first half of the 2020 Citrus Bowl against Alabama, setting a record for the longest field goal in Citrus Bowl history, and tying the record for the longest field goal made in Michigan's program history.

On November 14, 2020, Nordin set a Michigan program record for the most field goals at 40 yards or longer (14) with a 46-yard field goal in third quarter during a game against Wisconsin.

=== College statistics ===
Season	Team	Conf	GP	Kicking						
Season	Team	Conf	GP	XPM	XPA	XP%	FGM	FGA	FG%	Pts
2017	Michigan	Big Ten	13	35	38	92.1	19	24	79.2	92
2018	Michigan	Big Ten	10	44	45	97.8	11	16	68.8	77
2019	Michigan	Big Ten	10	28	29	96.6	10	13	76.9	58
2020	Michigan	Big Ten	4	12	12	100.0	2	5	40.0	18
Career			37	119	124	96.0	42	58	72.4	245
All values from Sports Reference

== Professional career ==
Pre-draft measurables
Height	Weight	Arm length	Hand span	Wingspan
6 ft 0 3/4 in (1.85 m)	193 lb (88 kg)	32 1/4 in (0.82 m)	9 in (0.23 m)	6 ft 4 in (1.93 m)
All values from Pro Day

After not being selected in the 2021 NFL draft, Nordin signed as an undrafted free agent (UDFA) with the New England Patriots on May 6, 2021. Unusually, Nordin was the only UDFA signed by the Patriots in 2021.

On August 31, 2021, the New England Patriots chose Nordin to be their kicker, cutting veteran kicker Nick Folk, despite a "disastrous" second preseason game against the Philadelphia Eagles in which he missed a 36-yard field goal and two extra point attempts. After being inactive Week 1, he was placed on injured reserve on September 18, 2021 with an abdomen injury. He was released on December 1, 2021 and re-signed to the practice squad. He signed a reserve/future contract with the Patriots on January 17, 2022.

On June 10, 2022, Nordin was waived with a non-football injury designation. Three days later Nordin cleared waivers and reverted to the Patriots' reserve/NFI list. He was waived on February 15, 2023.
