= John O'Korn =

American football player (born 1994)

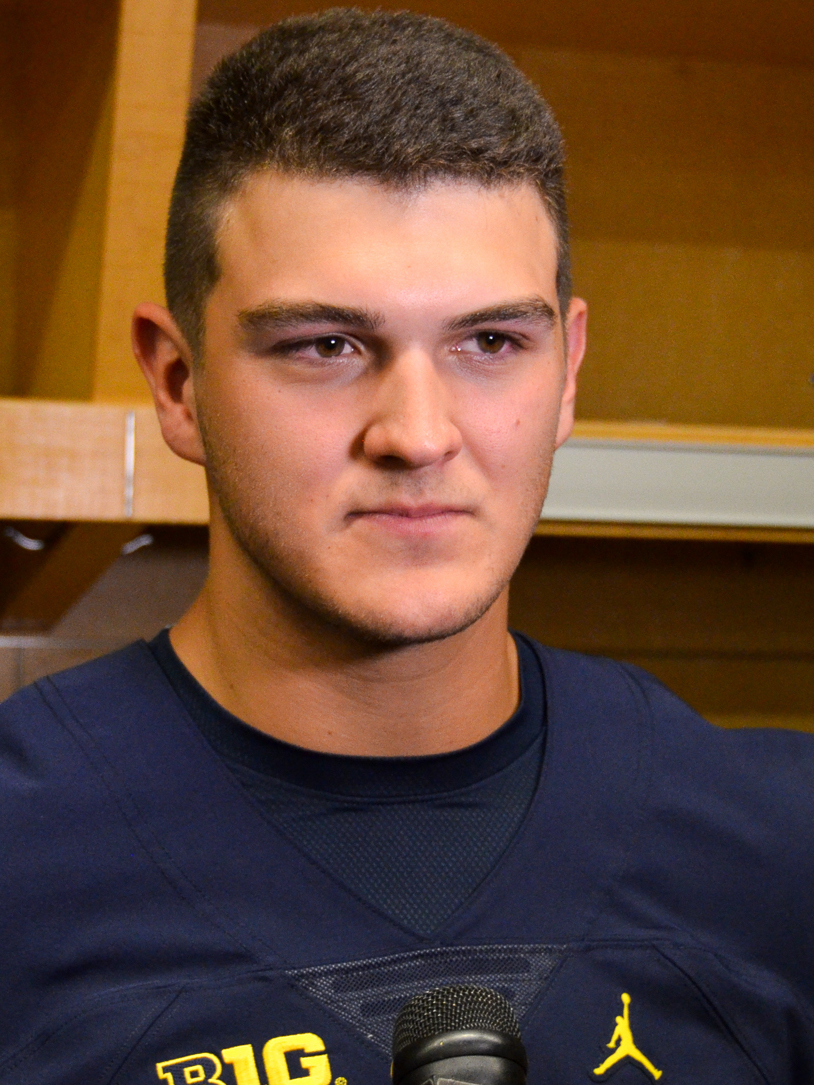
- O'Korn in 2016

Profile
- Position: Quarterback

Personal information
- Born: November 22, 1994 (age 32); Huntingdon, Pennsylvania, U.S.
- Listed height: 6 ft 4 in (1.93 m)
- Listed weight: 211 lb (96 kg)

Career information
- High school: St. Thomas Aquinas (Fort Lauderdale, Florida)
- College: Houston (2013–2014); Michigan (2015–2017)
- NFL draft: 2018: undrafted

Awards and highlights
- AAC Rookie of the Year (2013)

John August O'Korn (born November 22, 1994) is an American former football quarterback. After attending St. Thomas Aquinas High School in Fort Lauderdale, Florida, where he led his team to the 2012 FHSAA 7A state high school title, O'Korn chose to attend the University of Houston. He began as the starting quarterback for Houston during the 2013 season as a true freshman after teammate David Piland suffered career-ending injuries. After throwing 3,117 yards and 28 touchdowns as a freshman and honored with the American Athletic Conference Freshman Player of the Year, he lost his starting position after starting the first five games in the 2014 season. On February 5, 2015, he announced his plans to transfer to the University of Michigan, where he threw for 1,146 yards and 4 touchdowns over two years.

== Early life ==
John O'Korn was born to Gary and Paula O'Korn in Huntingdon, Pennsylvania. He attended Huntingdon Area High School, where he played quarterback, throwing for 1,018 yards and 10 touchdowns as a sophomore, starting 5 games. As a youth, John was an outstanding baseball and basketball player as well as wrestler, placing in several national tournaments. When his family moved to Fort Lauderdale, Florida, O'Korn attended St. Thomas Aquinas High School. In his first season at St. Thomas Aquinas, he threw for 377 yards, seven touchdowns and three interceptions. The next season, he led the team to the 2012 Florida High School Athletic Association (FHSAA) 7A state title with an average of 43 points per game. Throwing for 22 touchdowns with just 4 interceptions and over 2,500 yards.

He received scholarship offers from Wisconsin, Louisville, Syracuse, Mississippi State, North Carolina, South Florida, and UCF in addition to Houston.

== College career ==
=== Houston ===
==== 2013 season ====
O'Korn earned the backup position for quarterback during preseason camp behind David Piland. However, he made his first collegiate appearance during the first half of the season opener. He became the quarterback beginning with the 2013 Bayou Bucket Classic against Rice. When Piland announced that he would end his career due to concussions, O'Korn was solidified in the role.

==== 2014 season ====
O'Korn was the starting quarterback for the first five games of the 2014 season before being benched in favor of Greg Ward Jr. The benching was due to an offensive scheme change due to 2013 Offensive Coordinator Doug Meacham leaving for same position at TCU.

=== Michigan ===
==== 2015 season ====
On February 5, 2015, O'Korn announced that he would be transferring to the University of Michigan. Due to NCAA transfer rules, O'Korn sat out the 2015 season. He spent the 2015 season serving as the scout team quarterback.

==== 2016 season ====
2016 Spring practice began on February 29 with a highly anticipated quarterback battle between redshirt junior Shane Morris, O'Korn, redshirt sophomore Wilton Speight, true freshman Brandon Peters and redshirt freshman Alex Malzone. As Spring practice wound down in late March, Speight, O'Korn and Morris seemed to be the leading three, but in that order. O'Korn and Speight were the starters in the April 1 Spring game.

On September 3 before the opening game against Hawaii, Speight was named as the starting quarterback, despite O’Korn leading the preseason point challenge. O'Korn made his Michigan debut in the third quarter after Michigan had built a 49–0 lead, and he went 3–3 on a touchdown scoring drive. After Speight was sidelined with an unspecified shoulder injury, O'Korn started and led the team to a 20–10 victory over Indiana on November 19. O'Korn posted 7 completions in 16 attempts for a total of 59 yards with no touchdowns or interceptions. The performance represented the lowest passing yardage total for Michigan since John Navarre posted 58 in a November 17, 2001, victory for the 2001 Wolverines against Wisconsin.

==== 2017 season ====
After another quarterback battle for the starting role, O'Korn entered the 2017 season as Speight's primary backup again and relieved him briefly in the second quarter of the season opener against Florida. After Speight suffered what would become a season-ending injury on September 23 against Purdue, O'Korn became the primary starter. He helped lead the Wolverines to victory against Purdue, but in his first season start of the season in the rivalry game against Michigan State, O'Korn threw three interceptions in a 14–10 loss. Against rival Ohio State, he also threw a costly pick in the fourth quarter with 2:47 left to play which cost the Wolverines the game. After the game, he emotionally blamed himself for the loss, saying with tears falling down his face, "the hardest part for me is just you come here to win this game and our senior class wasn’t able to do it, and you know I hold myself responsible for a lot of that…. I can’t imagine a worse feeling right now"

=== Statistics ===
Houston Cougars
Season	Passing							Rushing			
Season	Comp	Att	Yards	Pct.	TD	Int	QB rating	Att	Yards	Avg	TD
2013	259	446	3,117	58.1	28	10	133.0	77	104	1.4	1
2014	90	173	951	52.0	6	8	100.4	32	18	0.6	1
Michigan Wolverines
2015	Redshirt										
2016	20	34	173	58.8	2	0	121.0	12	31	2.6	0
2017	84	157	973	53.5	2	6	102.1	44	−54	−1.2	0
NCAA career totals	453	810	5,214	55.9	38	24	119.6	165	99	0.6	2
