= Karan Higdon =

American football player (born 1996)

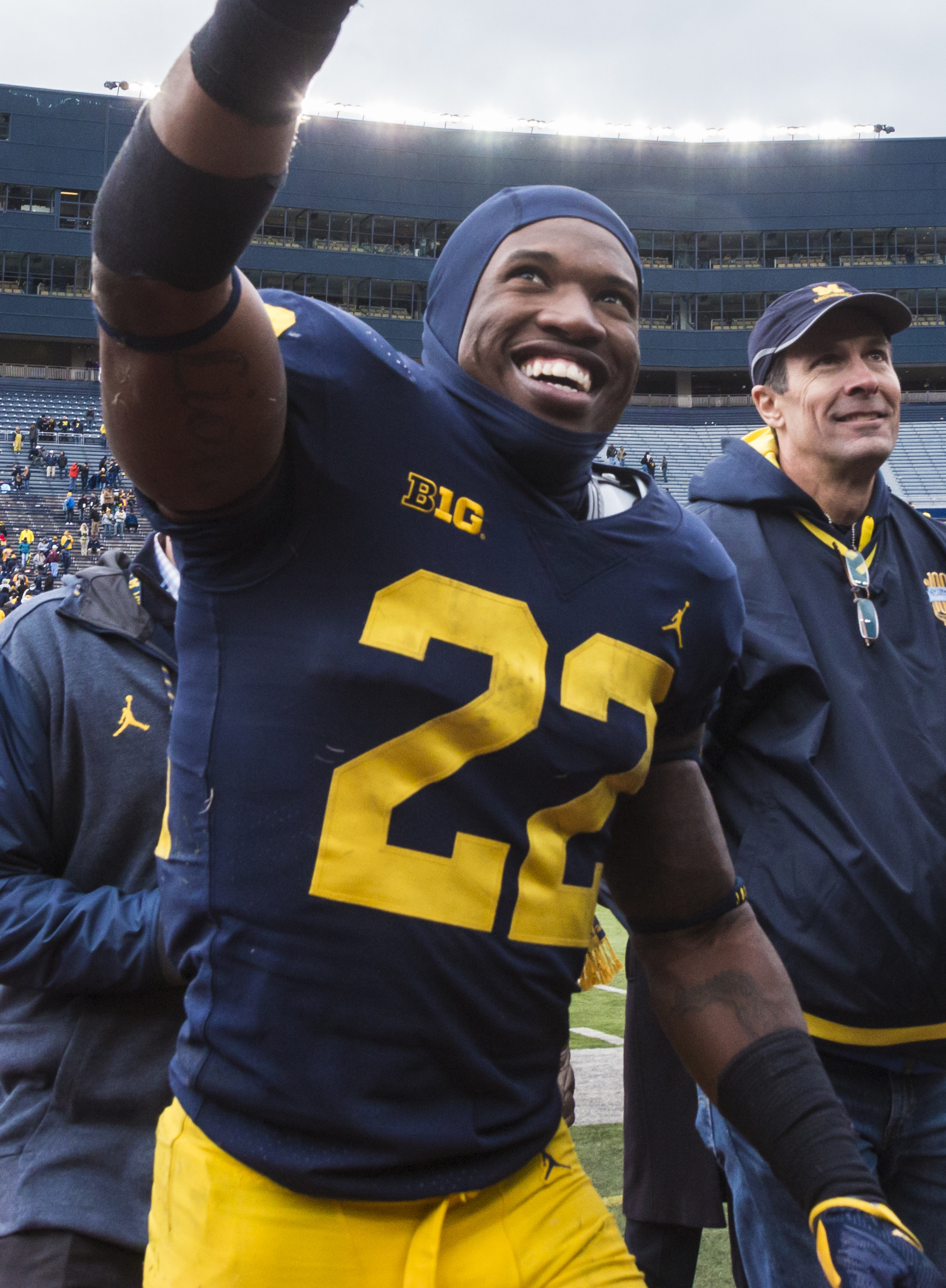
- Higdon in 2017

Profile
- Position: Running back

Personal information
- Born: September 8, 1996 (age 30)
- Listed height: 5 ft 10 in (1.78 m)
- Listed weight: 202 lb (92 kg)

Career information
- High school: Riverview (Sarasota, Florida)
- College: Michigan
- NFL draft: 2019: undrafted

Career history
- Houston Texans (2019–2020)*
- * Offseason or practice squad member only

Awards and highlights
- First-team All-Big Ten (2018); Third-team All-Big Ten (2017)
- Stats at Pro Football Reference

Karan Higdon (born September 8, 1996) is an American former professional football player who was a running back in the National Football League (NFL). He played college football for the Michigan Wolverines, twice earning All-Big Ten honors.

== Early life ==
Higdon grew up in Sarasota, Florida, and attended that city's Riverview High School where he rushed for 1,471 rushing yards and 16 touchdowns on 218 carries. Higdon initially gave a verbal commitment to Iowa, but flipped his commitment to Michigan after a campus visit to Ann Arbor.

== College career ==
As a freshman for Michigan in 2015, Higdon appeared briefly in three games and totaled 19 rushing yards on 11 carries. As a sophomore in 2016, Higdon appeared in 12 games and had back-to-back 100-yard rushing games against Rutgers (108 yards on 13 carries) and Illinois (106 on eight carries). He totaled 425 rushing yards and six touchdowns on 72 carries for an average of 5.9 yards per carry.

During the 2017 season, Higdon was Michigan's leading rusher with 994 yards on 165 carries. On October 14, 2017, Higdon rushed for a career best 200 yards and three touchdowns on 25 carries. He became the first Michigan running back to rush for 200 or more yards in a game since 2007. On November 4, 2017, Higdon recorded his second 200-yard game of the season, becoming the first Michigan running back to record multiple 200-yard games in the same season since Mike Hart in 2004. Following his outstanding performance, Higdon was named the Co-Big Ten Offensive Player of the Week. Following the 2017 season, Higdon was named to the All-Big Ten offensive third-team, by both the coaches and the media.

During the 2018 season, Higdon rushed for 156 yards on 13 carries against Western Michigan, 136 yards on 12 carries against Nebraska, and 115 yards on 30 carries against Northwestern. He scored the game-winning touchdown on a five-yard run in the fourth quarter of the Northwestern game. He missed the SMU game with a lower-body injury suffered in practice. He rushed for 103 yards on 25 carries against Maryland, becoming the 23rd player in Michigan program history to surpass 2,000 career rushing yards (2,020). He rushed for 132 yards against Penn State, his seventh consecutive game surpassing 100-yards. This was the second-longest streak in Michigan program history, trailing only Mike Hart's eight consecutive games with 100-yards rushing in 2007. On November 10, 2018, he rushed for 42 yards against Rutgers, surpassing the 1,000-yard rushing mark in the second quarter. He became the first 1,000-yard running back for Michigan since Fitzgerald Toussaint in 2011, and the first player of any kind to rush for over 1,000 yards since Denard Robinson in 2012. On November 17, Higdon rushed for 101 yards on 21 carries against Indiana, recording his eighth 100-yard rushing game this season. Higdon's 100-yard game was the 13th of his career, tying him with Gordon Bell, Billy Taylor and Tim Biakabutuka for the eighth-most 100-yard rushing games during a career in Michigan program history. Higdon finished the season with 1,178 yards on 224 carries, with 10 touchdowns. He scored one touchdown or more in eight of 11 games played and averaged 111.0 all-purpose yards per game. Following the season, he was named to the All-Big Ten offensive first-team by both the coaches and media He decided not to play in Michigan's bowl game, the Peach Bowl, in order to prepare for the 2019 NFL draft.

== Professional career ==
Pre-draft measurables
Height	Weight	Arm length	Hand span	40-yard dash	10-yard split	20-yard split	Vertical jump	Broad jump	Bench press
5 ft 9 1/8 in (1.76 m)	206 lb (93 kg)	30 3/4 in (0.78 m)	9 5/8 in (0.24 m)	4.49 s	1.53 s	2.61 s	34.0 in (0.86 m)	10 ft 3 in (3.12 m)	21 reps
All values from NFL Combine

Higdon signed with the Houston Texans as an undrafted free agent following the 2019 NFL draft. The Texans waived him on August 31 during final roster cuts. On September 1, 2019, Higdon was signed to the Texans practice squad. He signed a reserve/future contract with the Texans on January 13, 2020.

On September 5, 2020, Higdon was waived by the Texans.
