= Brandon Peters =

American football player (born 1997)

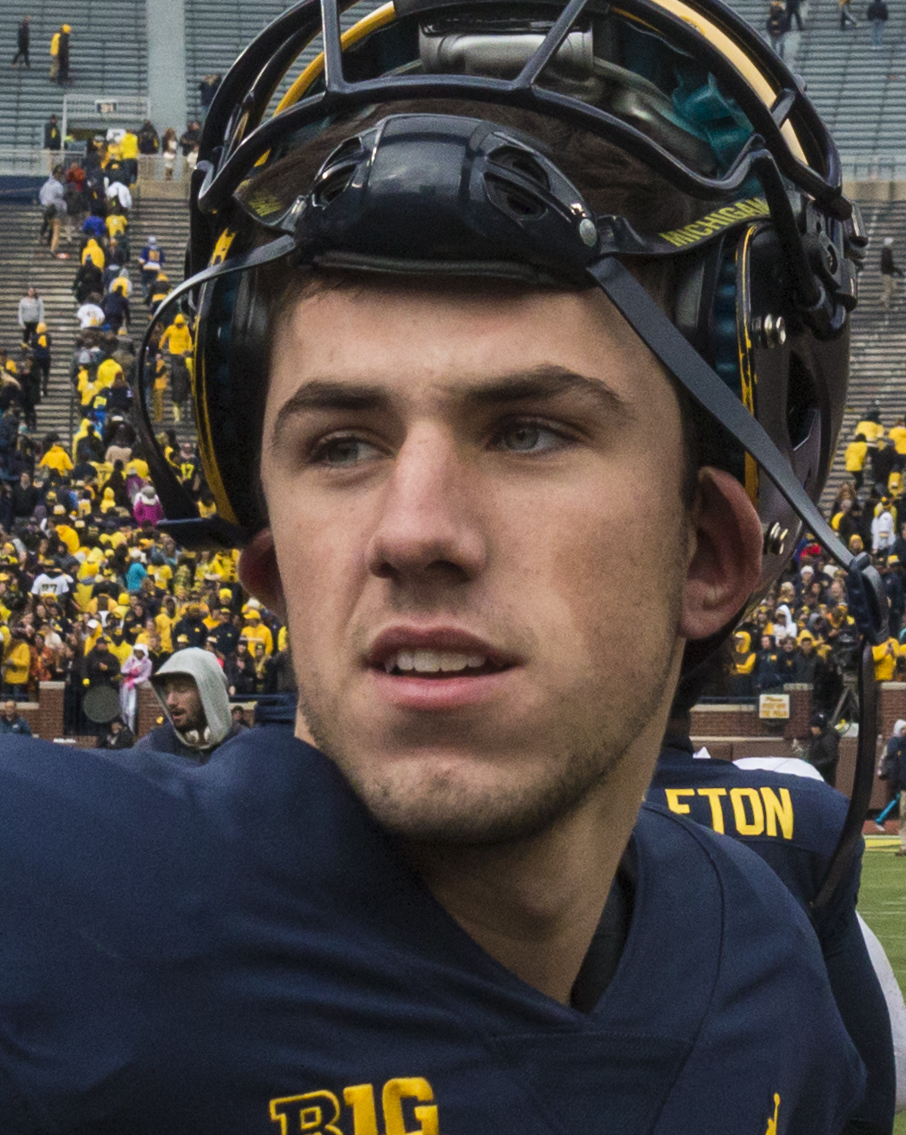
- Peters with the Michigan Wolverines in 2017

No. 18
- Position: Quarterback

Personal information
- Born: October 15, 1997 (age 29); Avon, Indiana, U.S.
- Listed height: 6 ft 4 in (1.93 m)
- Listed weight: 228 lb (103 kg)

Career information
- High school: Avon
- College: Michigan (2016–2018); Illinois (2019–2021)
- NFL draft: 2022: undrafted

Career history
- Los Angeles Chargers (2022)*
- * Offseason or practice squad member only

Michael Brandon Peters (born October 15, 1997) is an American former college football quarterback. He played at Michigan before transferring to Illinois.

== Early life ==
Peters played high school football and basketball at Avon High School in Indiana. As a senior in 2015, he led Avon to a regional football championship, appearing in 13 games and completing 218 of 363 passes for 3,103 yards, 37 touchdowns, and five interceptions. In December 2015, The Indianapolis Star selected him as its Mr. Football for the 2015 season. He was also named the Gatorade Player of the Year in Indiana. He participated in the Elite 11 quarterback event in July 2015, and he was rated by ESPN as the No. 5 quarterback in the class of 2016 and the No. 60 overall player in the 2016 ESPN 300.

== College career ==
=== Michigan ===
On April 27, 2015, Peters committed to play college football at the University of Michigan. He enrolled early at Michigan in January 2016. In February 2016, Michigan coach Jim Harbaugh compared Peters to Andrew Luck, noting that "I saw a lot of similar things in Brandon—a natural player, not over-coached or over-mechanized." 2016 Spring practice began on February 29 with a highly anticipated quarterback battle between redshirt sophomore Wilton Speight, redshirt junior John O'Korn, redshirt junior Shane Morris, true freshman Peters and redshirt freshman Alex Malzone. As Spring practice wound down in late March, Speight, O'Korn and Morris seemed to be the leading three, in that order. On September 3 before the opening game against Hawaii, Speight was named as the starting quarterback. Peters did not see game action during the 2016 season.

In 2017, Peters was engaged in a quarterback battle with incumbent starter Wilton Speight and 2016 backup John O'Korn. On August 12, 2017, Jim Harbaugh revealed that Speight and O'Korn were the leaders in the quarterback battle, with Peters designated to a back-up role. In a game against Rutgers on October 28, 2017, Peters replaced O'Korn in the second quarter, with the game tied 7–7. He led the team to 3 consecutive scoring drives, including throwing the teams first touchdown pass in over a month en route to a 35–14 victory. Peters would go on to start the next 3 games, winning against Minnesota, winning at Maryland, and in the loss at Wisconsin. Peters would get concussed in the 3rd quarter against Wisconsin and did not recover until the Outback Bowl. Peters would start in the bowl game however, which was a 19–26 loss to South Carolina.

For the 2018 season, Peters was the 3rd string quarterback, backing up Shea Patterson and Dylan McCaffrey. He saw playing time in the 49–3 win against Western Michigan, the 56–10 win against Nebraska, the 42–7 win against Penn State, the 42–7 win at Rutgers (where he led a scoring drive), and the 39–62 loss at Ohio State where he set up a rushing touchdown with a completion to the one yard line.

=== Illinois ===
On June 18, 2019, Peters announced that he would be transferring to Illinois. Peters completed his undergraduate degree at Michigan in three years, and was immediately eligible to play for Illinois as a grad transfer with two years of eligibility remaining.

== Professional career ==
Pre-draft measurables
Height	Weight	Arm length	Hand span	40-yard dash	10-yard split	20-yard split	20-yard shuttle	Three-cone drill	Vertical jump	Broad jump
6 ft 4 1/2 in (1.94 m)	228 lb (103 kg)	31 1/8 in (0.79 m)	10 1/8 in (0.26 m)	4.72 s	1.57 s	2.75 s	4.50 s	7.53 s	36.0 in (0.91 m)	10 ft 4 in (3.15 m)
All values from Pro Day

Peters signed with the Los Angeles Chargers as an undrafted free agent on April 30, 2022. He was waived on August 15, 2022.

Peters has since retired from professional football and is a wealth management specialist as of December 2023.
