= Ty Isaac =

American football player (born 1994)

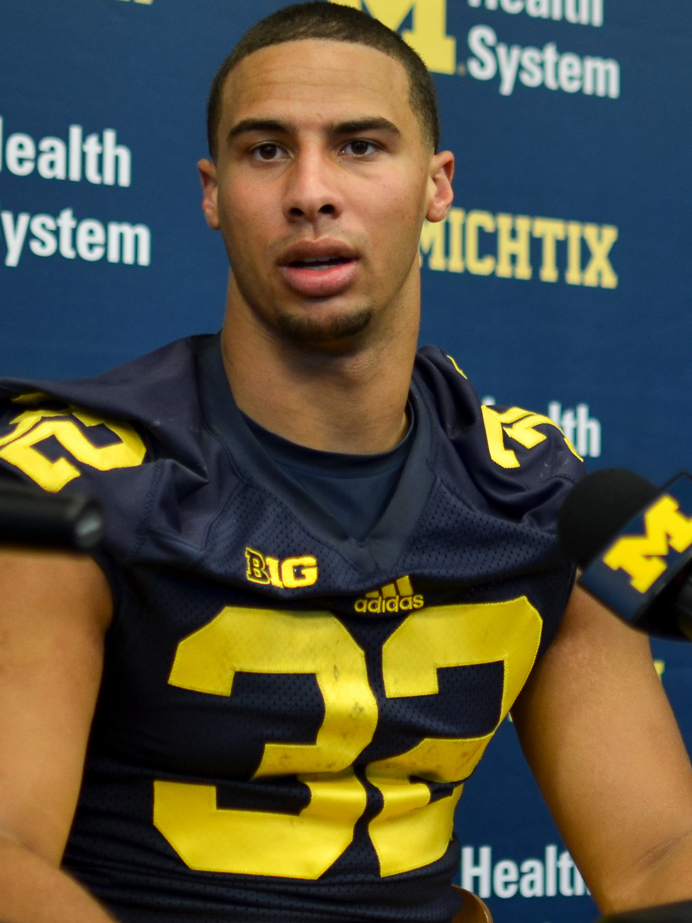
- Issac in 2015

No. 32
- Position: Running back

Personal information
- Born: October 16, 1994 (age 32)
- Listed height: 6 ft 2 in (1.88 m)
- Listed weight: 227 lb (103 kg)

Career information
- High school: Joliet Catholic (IL)
- College: USC; Michigan
- NFL draft: 2018: undrafted

Career history
- Birmingham Iron (2019)

Awards and highlights
- 2011 USA Today All-USA high school football team; 2013 Under Armour All-America Game; IHSA championship game rushing record (515 yards); 2011 Chicago Sun-Times Football Player of the Year

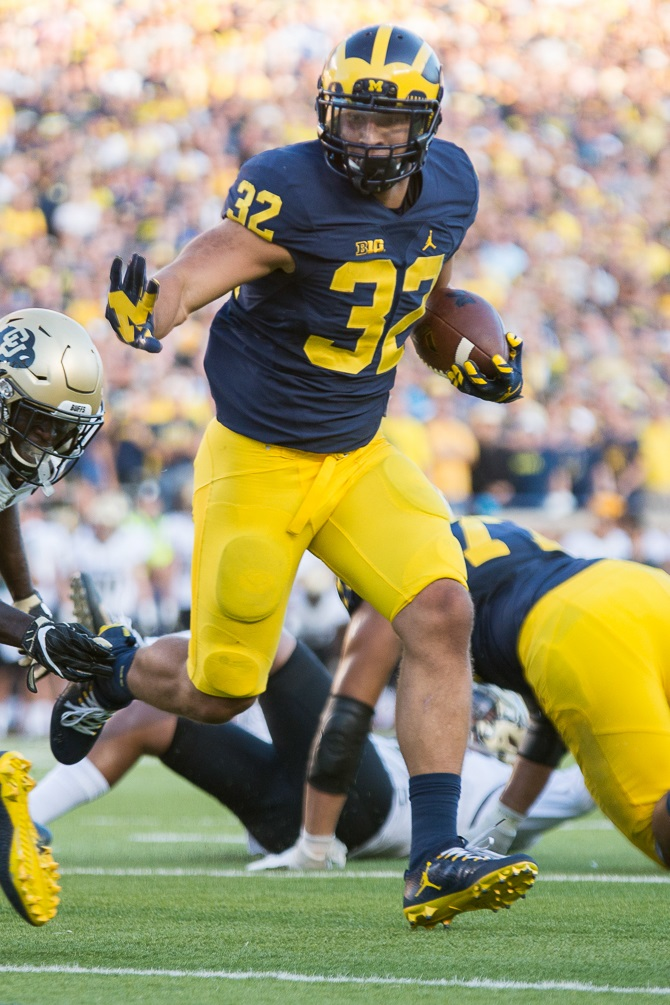
Isaac scoring his first touchdown of the season for the 2016 Wolverines

Ty Isaac (born October 16, 1994) is an American former football running back. He played college football for the Michigan Wolverines. He played his freshman season for the 2013 USC Trojans before transferring to the University of Michigan.

In high school, he played varsity for four years at Joliet Catholic Academy, helping the team to reach the Illinois High School Association (IHSA) Class 5A championship game twice. He was a member of the 2011 USA Today All-USA high school football team and 2013 Under Armour All-America Game team. His 515-yard rushing performance in 2011 is an IHSA championship game record. As a junior, he was recognized as the 2011 Chicago Sun-Times Football Player of the Year.

== Early life ==
Isaac is the son of Tyrone Isaac who was a captain and 1,000-yard rusher for the IHSA state Class 5A champion 1987 Joliet Catholic Academy team. The younger Isaac served as the team ball boy and water boy in his youth. He began attending football summer camp at Joliet Catholic Academy in third grade. By the time he was a high school freshman, he shared the backfield duties for the IHSA state Class 5A runner up. As a sophomore, he endured an injury plagued season. Nonetheless, big things were expected of him as a junior. He was one of only 5 Chicago metropolitan area selections to the 2011 ESPNU Class of 2013 watch list.

He was a 2011 USA Today All-USA high school football team selection as a junior and a 2013 Under Armour All-America Game selection as a senior for Joliet Catholic Academy. During his junior season, he rushed for 2,629 yards and 51 touchdowns, including a 515-yard, 6-touchdown effort in the 2011 IHSA Class 5A championship game against Montini Catholic High School. However, Isaac also lost two fumbles and threw an interception in what turned out to be a 70–45 championship game loss. His 515 rushing yards in the IHSA Class 5A Championship game surpassed Alonzo Wise's 1997 210-yard Class 5A championship game record and Matt Perez' 2009 316-yard all class record. At the end of the season, he earned the 2011 Chicago Sun-Times Football Player of the Year award.

The following spring, he committed to USC on May 15 after making several visits to USC, Michigan and Notre Dame. At the time ESPN ranked him as the number 68 player in the class of 2013. Michigan and USC were the two finalists. His senior season was impaired by injury. He endured a shoulder sprain and a groin injury that year but still managed to compile nearly 1,500 yards and 20 touchdowns. He had intended to take his official visit on December 7, 2012 along with other early enrollees and begin classes on January 14, 2013, but did not end up enrolling early. His official visit marked his fourth visit to USC (all hosted by Max Wittek).

College recruiting
Name	Hometown	School	Height	Weight	Commit date
Ty Isaac; TB	Joliet, IL	Joliet Catholic Academy	6 ft 3 in (1.91 m)	217 lb (98 kg)	May 15, 2012
Ty Isaac; TB	Recruit ratings: Scout: Rivals: ESPN:				
Overall recruit ranking: Scout: 7 (RB) Rivals: 27, 4 (ATH), 2 (IL) ESPN: 122, 13 (ATH), 4 (IL)
Note: In many cases, Scout, Rivals, 247Sports, On3, and ESPN may conflict in their listings of height and weight.; In these cases, the average was taken. ESPN grades are on a 100-point scale.; Sources: "USC Signee List 2013". Rivals.; "2013 USC Football Signees". Scout.; "ESPN USC Signees". ESPN.; "Scout.com Team Recruiting Rankings". Scout.; "2013 Team Ranking". Rivals.com.

== College ==
=== USC ===
He matriculated to play for the USC Trojans football team and debuted in the season opener for the 2013 Trojans on August 29, 2013 against Hawaii. His breakout game came on November 9, when starter Silas Redd left the game early against Cal and Isaac rushed for 87 yards and his first 2 touchdowns on 11 carries. His 44-yard, 8-carry 2013 Las Vegas Bowl performance against Fresno State, which included a 35-yard reception, was also considered a sign of his potential. For the season, he rushed for 236 yards on 40 carries and had 57 receiving yards.

=== Transfer to Michigan ===
He decided to transfer following his freshman season, and cited geographic distance from his ailing mother as his reason for wanting to return to the midwest. The leading contenders were Northwestern, Notre Dame, Illinois and possibly Michigan. He was blocked from transferring to Notre Dame by USC. He selected Michigan. His request to play immediately for the 2014 Wolverines was denied by the National Collegiate Athletic Association.

=== 2015 season ===
Isaac debuted for Michigan on September 5, 2015, gaining 12 yards on four carries as a backup player in the season opener against Utah. On September 19, 2015, Isaac posted a 76-yard run as part of a 114-yard (eight-carry) effort against UNLV, which was the longest run by a Wolverine since Denard Robinson posted a 79-yard run against Air Force on September 8, 2012 for the 2012 team.

Following an injury to Michigan's top running back, De'Veon Smith, Isaac started against Maryland in Michigan's fifth game on October 3, 2015. After Isaac gained only 17 yards, fumbled twice, and drew a roughing-the-punter penalty in his first start, Mark Snyder of the Detroit Free Press wrote that Isaac "might not be reliable" and had been "strikingly unproductive." On October 5, 2015, Michigan announced that Isaac had dropped to a tie for third in Michigan's depth chart along with Derrick Green, behind De'Veon Smith and Drake Johnson.

After the Maryland game, Isaac's playing time dropped sharply, carrying the ball only twice against Northwestern and twice against Minnesota. On November 2, 2015, Michigan announced that Isaac was not on that week's depth chart. Head coach Jim Harbaugh said, "It's an internal matter."

During the 2015 season, Isaac had 30 carries for 205 yards. He had no carries in the final six games of the season.

=== 2016 season ===
During the 2016 season, Isaac rushed for 411 yards on 74 carries (5.6 yards per carry) and scored five rushing touchdowns, including a 53-yard touchdown run against Maryland. In the Wolverines' October 8 game against Rutgers, Isaac rushed for 93 yards and two touchdowns.

=== 2017 season ===
Isaac opened the 2017 season with a 114-yard effort on 11 carries against the 17th-ranked Florida Gators on September 2. He followed that with a career-high performance of 133 yards on September 9 against Cincinnati. After posting 109 yards, Isaac was injured on October 28 against Rutgers.

2022

Isaac received a masters degree from the University of Michigan.

== Birmingham Iron ==
Pre-draft measurables
Height	Weight	Arm length	Hand span
6 ft 2 1/8 in (1.88 m)	227 lb (103 kg)	32 in (0.81 m)	10 1/8 in (0.26 m)
All values from Pro Day

In 2018, Isaac signed with the Birmingham Iron of the Alliance of American Football for the 2019 season. The league ceased operations in April 2019.
