= 2015 Michigan Wolverines football team =

American college football season

2015 Michigan Wolverines football

Citrus Bowl champion

Citrus Bowl, W 41–7 vs. Florida
- Conference: Big Ten Conference
- East Division

Ranking
- Coaches: No. 11
- AP: No. 12
- Record: 10–3 (6–2 Big Ten)
- Head coach: Jim Harbaugh (1st season)
- Offensive coordinator: Tim Drevno (1st season)
- Offensive scheme: Pro-style
- Defensive coordinator: D. J. Durkin (1st season); Greg Mattison (bowl game)
- Base defense: 4–3
- MVP: Jehu Chesson
- Captains: Joe Bolden; Joe Kerridge
- Home stadium: Michigan Stadium

2015 Big Ten Conference football standings
	Conf.			Overall
Team	W		L	W		L
East Division
No. 6 Michigan State xy$^	7	–	1	12	–	2
No. 4 Ohio State x	7	–	1	12	–	1
No. 12 Michigan	6	–	2	10	–	3
Penn State	4	–	4	7	–	6
Indiana	2	–	6	6	–	7
Rutgers	1	–	7	4	–	8
Maryland	1	–	7	3	–	9
West Division
No. 9 Iowa xy	8	–	0	12	–	2
No. 23 Northwestern	6	–	2	10	–	3
No. 21 Wisconsin	6	–	2	10	–	3
Nebraska	3	–	5	6	–	7
Minnesota	2	–	6	6	–	7
Illinois	2	–	6	5	–	7
Purdue	1	–	7	2	–	10
Championship: Michigan State 16, Iowa 13
^ – College Football Playoff participant; $ – Conference champion; x – Division champion/co-champions; y – Championship game participant; Rankings from AP Poll

The 2015 Michigan Wolverines football team represented the University of Michigan in the sport of college football during the 2015 NCAA Division I FBS football season. The Wolverines competed in the East Division of the Big Ten Conference, and played their home games at Michigan Stadium in Ann Arbor, Michigan. Michigan was led by head coach Jim Harbaugh, who was in his first season.

Michigan's first game under Harbaugh was a road game against Utah, which the Wolverines lost 17–24. The team won their three remaining non-conference games in dominant fashion, including a 31–0 victory over then-No. 22 BYU, which was just Michigan's second victory over a ranked opponent in their previous 11 tries. This was the first season since 2002 in which Michigan didn't play Notre Dame either home or away. That game was the first in a series of three straight shutout victories, including a 38–0 victory over then-No. 13 Northwestern, the first three-game shutout streak for Michigan since 1980. Michigan rose to 12th in the polls, but fell to in-state rival Michigan State 27–23 after the Spartans returned a muffed punt for a touchdown on the last play of the game. The Wolverines won their remaining Big Ten games before a blow-out loss to rival Ohio State to end the regular season 6–2 in Big Ten play, to finish in third place in the East Division. Michigan was invited to the Citrus Bowl, where they defeated Florida, 41–7, to finish the year with a record of 10–3, and were ranked 12th in the final AP Poll. It was Michigan's first 10-win season since 2011. The team was the first Michigan team to go undefeated on the road in conference play since the national champion 1997 Michigan Wolverines football team.

Offensively, Michigan was led by quarterback Jake Rudock, a transfer from Iowa, who led the Big Ten in pass completion percentage (64%), and was the first Michigan quarterback to eclipse 3,000 yards passing since John Navarre in 2003. Tight end Jake Butt received the Kwalick-Clark Award as the Big Ten's tight end of the year. On defense, linebacker Jabrill Peppers was named Big Ten Freshman of the Year and was joined on the All-Big Ten first team by cornerback Jourdan Lewis.

== Preseason ==
In 2014, Michigan compiled a 5–7 record and was not bowl eligible for the first time since 2009. As a result of the team's poor record, head coach Brady Hoke was fired on December 2. His job status had been in jeopardy since September 28, 2014 when QB Shane Morris was reinserted after a concussion. On December 30, following a much publicized coaching search, Michigan announced the hiring of San Francisco 49ers coach and former Michigan quarterback Jim Harbaugh as the 20th head coach in the program's history. Harbaugh hired D. J. Durkin for the defensive coordinator and linebacker coach positions and Tim Drevno for the offensive coordinator and offensive line coach positions. In addition to the co-ordinator positions, Harbaugh also hired John Baxter to coach special teams, former Jacksonville Jaguars offensive coordinator Jedd Fisch as the passing game coordinator and wide receivers coach, Jim Harbaugh's son Jay as the tight ends coach, Greg Jackson and Mike Zordich as the secondary coaches, Kevin Tolbert as the strength and conditioning coach, and former running back Tyrone Wheatley—who won a Rose Bowl while playing at Michigan—to coach the running backs. Michigan also retained Greg Mattison from Hoke's staff as the defensive line coach.

== Recruiting ==
=== Recruits ===
Michigan's recruiting class consisted of a total of 14 recruits.

College recruiting information
Name	Hometown	School	Height	Weight	40^{‡}	Commit date
Brian Cole II; WR	Saginaw, Michigan	Heritage H.S.	6 ft 2 in (1.88 m)	200 lb (91 kg)	4.45	Jul 26, 2014
Brian Cole II; WR	Recruit ratings: Scout: Rivals: 247Sports: ESPN:					
Andrew David; K	Massillon, Ohio	Massillon H.S.	5 ft 8.5 in (1.74 m)	170 lb (77 kg)	—	Apr 23, 2013
Andrew David; K	Recruit ratings: Scout: Rivals: 247Sports: ESPN:					
Zach Gentry; QB	Albuquerque, New Mexico	Eldorado H.S.	6 ft 6 in (1.98 m)	231 lb (105 kg)	—	Jan 24, 2015
Zach Gentry; QB	Recruit ratings: Scout: Rivals: 247Sports: ESPN:					
Karan Higdon; RB	Sarasota, Florida	Riverview H.S.	5 ft 10 in (1.78 m)	190 lb (86 kg)	4.45	Feb 4, 2015
Karan Higdon; RB	Recruit ratings: Scout: Rivals: 247Sports: ESPN:					
Shelton Johnson; DE	Delray Beach, Florida	Atlantic Community H.S.	6 ft 4 in (1.93 m)	225 lb (102 kg)	—	Feb 4, 2015
Shelton Johnson; DE	Recruit ratings: Scout: Rivals: 247Sports: ESPN:					
Reuben Jones; DE	Lakeland, Florida	Lake Gibson H.S.	6 ft 3.5 in (1.92 m)	224 lb (102 kg)	—	Jan 24, 2015
Reuben Jones; DE	Recruit ratings: Scout: Rivals: 247Sports: ESPN:					
Tyree Kinnel; DB	Huber Heights, Ohio	Wayne H.S.	5 ft 11 in (1.80 m)	183.5 lb (83.2 kg)	—	Aug 24, 2013
Tyree Kinnel; DB	Recruit ratings: Scout: Rivals: 247Sports: ESPN:					
Alex Malzone; QB	Bloomfield Hills, Michigan	Brother Rice H.S.	6 ft 1.5 in (1.87 m)	204 lb (93 kg)	—	May 12, 2014
Alex Malzone; QB	Recruit ratings: Scout: Rivals: 247Sports: ESPN:					
Grant Newsome; OL	Lawrenceville, New Jersey	Lawrenceville School	6 ft 4 in (1.93 m)	285 lb (129 kg)	—	Jun 11, 2014
Grant Newsome; OL	Recruit ratings: Scout: Rivals: 247Sports: ESPN:					
Grant Perry; WR	Bloomfield Hills, Michigan	Brother Rice H.S.	5 ft 11.5 in (1.82 m)	179 lb (81 kg)	—	Feb 3, 2015
Grant Perry; WR	Recruit ratings: Scout: Rivals: 247Sports: ESPN:					
Jon Runyan Jr. OL	Philadelphia, Pennsylvania	St. Joseph's Prep	6 ft 4 in (1.93 m)	275.5 lb (125.0 kg)	—	Jun 25, 2013
Jon Runyan Jr. OL	Recruit ratings: Scout: Rivals: 247Sports: ESPN:					
Nolan Ulizio; OL	West Chester, Ohio	Lakota West H.S.	6 ft 5.5 in (1.97 m)	286.5 lb (130.0 kg)	—	Jan 25, 2015
Nolan Ulizio; OL	Recruit ratings: Scout: Rivals: 247Sports: ESPN:					
Keith Washington; DB	Prattville, Alabama	Prattville H.S.	6 ft 2 in (1.88 m)	170 lb (77 kg)	—	Feb 4, 2015
Keith Washington; DB	Recruit ratings: Scout: Rivals: 247Sports: ESPN:					
Tyrone Wheatley Jr. TE	Buffalo, New York	Canisius H.S.	6 ft 6 in (1.98 m)	260 lb (120 kg)	—	Feb 4, 2015
Tyrone Wheatley Jr. TE	Recruit ratings: Scout: Rivals: 247Sports: ESPN:					
Overall recruit ranking: Scout: 36 Rivals: 50 247Sports: 38 ESPN: 40
‡ Refers to 40-yard dash; Note: In many cases, Scout, Rivals, 247Sports, On3, and ESPN may conflict in their listings of height, weight and 40 time.; In these cases, the average was taken. ESPN grades are on a 100-point scale.; Sources: "Michigan Football Commitments". Rivals.; "2015 Michigan Football Commits". Scout.; "ESPN". ESPN.; "Scout.com Team Recruiting Rankings". Scout.; "2015 Team Ranking". Rivals.com.

== Rankings ==
Ranking movements Legend: ██ Increase in ranking ██ Decrease in ranking — = Not ranked RV = Received votes
	Week															
Poll	Pre	1	2	3	4	5	6	7	8	9	10	11	12	13	14	Final
AP	RV	—	—	—	22	18	12	15	15	16	15	14	12	19	17	12
Coaches	RV	—	RV	—	RV	21	14	17	17	17	15	13	12	19	17	11
CFP	Not released									17	14	12	10	15	14	Not released

== Schedule ==
Date	Time	Opponent	Rank	Site	TV	Result	Attendance	Source
September 3	8:30 p.m.	at Utah*		Rice-Eccles Stadium; Salt Lake City, UT	FS1	L 17–24	47,825	
September 12	12:00 p.m.	Oregon State*		Michigan Stadium; Ann Arbor, MI	ABC	W 35–7	109,651	
September 19	12:00 p.m.	UNLV*		Michigan Stadium; Ann Arbor, MI	BTN	W 28–7	108,683	
September 26	12:00 p.m.	No. 22 BYU*		Michigan Stadium; Ann Arbor, MI	ABC	W 31–0	108,940	
October 3	12:00 p.m.	at Maryland	No. 22	Byrd Stadium; College Park, MD	BTN	W 28–0	51,802	
October 10	3:30 p.m.	No. 13 Northwestern^{†}	No. 18	Michigan Stadium; Ann Arbor, MI (rivalry)	BTN	W 38–0	110,452	
October 17	3:30 p.m.	No. 7 Michigan State	No. 12	Michigan Stadium; Ann Arbor, MI (rivalry, College GameDay)	ESPN	L 23–27	111,740	
October 31	7:00 p.m.	at Minnesota	No. 15	TCF Bank Stadium; Minneapolis, MN (Little Brown Jug)	ESPN	W 29–26	50,709	
November 7	3:30 p.m.	Rutgers	No. 17	Michigan Stadium; Ann Arbor, MI	BTN	W 49–16	109,879	
November 14	3:30 p.m.	at Indiana	No. 14	Memorial Stadium; Bloomington, IN	ABC, ESPN2	W 48–41 ^{2OT}	49,557	
November 21	12:00 p.m.	at Penn State	No. 12	Beaver Stadium; State College, PA (rivalry)	ABC	W 28–16	107,418	
November 28	12:00 p.m.	No. 8 Ohio State	No. 10	Michigan Stadium; Ann Arbor, MI (The Game)	ABC	L 13–42	111,829	
January 1, 2016	1:00 p.m.	vs. No. 19 Florida*	No. 14	Orlando Citrus Bowl; Orlando, FL (Citrus Bowl)	ABC	W 41–7	63,113	
*Non-conference game; ^{†}Homecoming; Rankings from AP Poll and CFP Rankings after November 3 released prior to game; All times are in Eastern time

== Radio ==
Radio coverage for all games was broadcast statewide on The Michigan IMG Sports Network and on Sirius XM Satellite Radio. The radio announcers were Jim Brandstatter with play-by-play, Dan Dierdorf with color commentary, and Doug Karsch with sideline reports.

== Game summaries ==
=== At Utah ===
Michigan at Utah

Team	1	2	3	4	Total
Wolverines	0	3	7	7	17
• Utes	3	7	7	7	24

- Date: September 3
- Location: Rice-Eccles Stadium
  Salt Lake City, Utah
- Game start: 8:35 p.m. EDT
- Elapsed time: 3:14
- Game attendance: 47,825
- Game weather: 85F, Partly Cloudy, S 10 MPH
- Referee: Steven Strimling
- TV announcers (FS1): Gus Johnson, Joel Klatt & Molly McGrath

Scoring summary
1	10:30	UTAH	Andy Phillips 30-yard field goal	UTAH 3–0
1	14:13	MICH	Kenny Allen 29-yard field goal	Tie 3–3
2	10:33	UTAH	Devontae Booker 1-yard run (Andy Phillips kick)	UTAH 10–3
3	5:49	UTAH	Travis Wilson 14-yard run (Andy Phillips kick)	UTAH 17–3
3	0:46	MICH	Jake Butt 19-yard pass from Jake Rudock (Kenny Allen kick)	UTAH 17–10
4	7:58	UTAH	Justin Thomas 55-yard interception return (Andy Phillips kick)	UTAH 24–10
4	0:54	MICH	Amara Darboh 10-yard pass from Jake Rudock (Kenny Allen kick)	UTAH 24–17

To open the season, Michigan faced the Utah Utes. Utah dominated the previous meeting, winning 26–10 in a game that featured an almost two-and-a-half hour weather delay. After a starting quarterback was not named during the team's preseason, Michigan chose to start graduate transfer Jake Rudock over the returning junior Shane Morris.

Utah defeated Michigan, 24–17. Utah opened the scoring in the first quarter via a 30-yard field goal from Andy Phillips. Michigan responded in the second quarter with a 29-yard field goal from Kenny Allen, but Utah regained the lead via a one-yard touchdown run from Devontae Booker and went into half-time leading 10–3. Utah extended its lead in the third quarter to 14 points via a 14-yard touchdown run from Travis Wilson, but Michigan responded with a 19-yard touchdown pass from Jake Rudock to Jake Butt. Utah regained its 14-point advantage in the fourth quarter when Justin Thomas intercepted Rudock and returned it 55 yards for a touchdown, but Michigan once again reduced Utah's lead to seven points with a ten-yard touchdown pass from Rudock to Amara Darboh. Utah recovered the ensuing onside kick and ran out the clock to complete its victory.

Jake Rudock completed 27 of his 43 pass attempts for 279 yards and two touchdowns and three interceptions. De'Veon Smith ran 17 times for 47 yards, while Jake Butt recorded eight receptions for 93 yards and a touchdown. Joe Bolden recorded his 200th career tackle during the game, and Michigan's defense as a whole recorded nine tackles for a loss. The announced attendance of 47,825 was the largest crowd in the history of Rice-Eccles Stadium.

=== Vs. Oregon State ===
Oregon State at Michigan

Team	1	2	3	4	Total
Beavers	7	0	0	0	7
• Wolverines	3	14	3	15	35

- Date: September 12
- Location: Michigan Stadium
  Ann Arbor, Michigan
- Game start: 12:06 p.m. EDT
- Elapsed time: 3:13
- Game attendance: 109,651
- Game weather: Mid 60s, Mostly cloudy, NW 10–20 MPH
- Referee: John O'Neill
- TV announcers (ABC): Sean McDonough, Chris Spielman & Todd McShay

Scoring summary
1	13:01	OSU	Hunter Jarmon 21-yard pass from Seth Collins (Garrett Owens kick)	OSU 7–0
1	8:20	MICH	Kenny Allen 40-yard field goal	OSU 7–3
2	4:03	MICH	De'Veon Smith 1-yard run (Kenny Allen kick)	MICH 10–7
2	0:12	MICH	De'Veon Smith 1-yard run (Kenny Allen kick)	MICH 17–7
3	9:25	MICH	Kenny Allen 29-yard field goal	MICH 20–7
4	14:18	MICH	De'Veon Smith 8-yard run (Smith pass from Rudock)	MICH 28–7
4	3:19	MICH	Derrick Green 2-yard run (Kenny Allen kick)	MICH 35–7

Following its game against Utah, Michigan hosted Oregon State for its home opener. This was the first meeting between the two schools since 1986, when Michigan defeated Oregon State 31–12 as Jim Harbaugh (then Michigan's quarterback) accounted for three touchdowns: two passing and one rushing.

After falling behind early in the first quarter, Michigan rallied to defeat Oregon State 35–7. Oregon State opened the scoring on its first drive of the game, moving the ball 79 yards in seven plays and scoring on a 21-yard touchdown pass from Seth Collins to Hunter Jarmon. Following Oregon State's touchdown, Michigan dominated the game on both offense and defense. After the teams traded fumbles in the first quarter, Michigan reduced Oregon State's lead to four points via a 40-yard field goal from Kenny Allen, and took the lead in the second quarter via a one-yard touchdown run from De'Veon Smith. Michigan added to its lead shortly before halftime with another one-yard touchdown run from Smith, giving it a 17–7 at half-time. Michigan added a 29-yard field goal in the third quarter, before finishing the scoring in the fourth quarter with an eight-yard touchdown run from Smith—and a two-point conversion pass from Rudock to Smith—and a two-yard touchdown run from Derrick Green.

Michigan dominated Oregon State in all statistical categories, out-gaining the Beavers 405–138 in yardage. Michigan rushed for 225 yards on 48 attempts, while Oregon State only managed 59 yards on 33 attempts. Oregon State only converted one first down out of 13 attempts on either third or fourth down. Oregon State gained 136 of its 138 yards of offense in the first quarter, before being shut down by the Wolverines defense and only gaining two total yards in the final three quarters. Inc contrast, Michigan gained 357 yards during the final three quarters. Smith rushed for 126 yards and three touchdowns, both career highs. The win was Jim Harbaugh's first win as coach at Michigan, while Michigan improved its record in home openers to 113–18–2.

=== Vs. UNLV ===
UNLV at Michigan

Team	1	2	3	4	Total
Rebels	0	0	0	7	7
• Wolverines	7	14	0	7	28

- Date: September 19
- Location: Michigan Stadium
  Ann Arbor, Michigan
- Game start: 12:01 p.m. EDT
- Elapsed time: 3:02
- Game attendance: 108,683
- Game weather: Low 70s, Cloudy, SW 15–25 MPH
- Referee: Mike Conlin
- TV announcers (BTN): Eric Collins, Chuck Long & Rick Pizzo

Scoring summary
1	9:30	MICH	De'Veon Smith 5-yard pass from Jake Rudock (Kenny Allen kick)	MICH 7–0
2	13:56	MICH	Jehu Chesson 36-yard run (Kenny Allen kick)	MICH 14–0
2	7:50	MICH	Ty Isaac 76-yard run (Kenny Allen kick)	MICH 21–0
4	11:31	MICH	Sione Houma 1-yard run (Kenny Allen kick)	MICH 28–0
4	9:17	UNLV	Devonte Boyd 6-yard pass from Blake Decker (Nicolai Bornand kick)	MICH 28–7

Following the game against Oregon State, Michigan hosted the University of Nevada, Las Vegas (UNLV) Rebels. This was the first ever meeting between the two programs.

Michigan defeated UNLV, 28–7. Michigan opened the scoring in the first quarter with a five-yard touchdown pass from Jake Rudock to De'Veon Smith and added to its lead in the second quarter with a 36-yard touchdown run from Jehu Chesson and a 76-yard touchdown run from Ty Isaac. After neither team scored in the third quarter, Michigan added to its lead with a one-yard touchdown run from Sione Houma. UNLV responded with a six-yard touchdown pass from Blake Decker to Devonte Boyd, which ended the scoring.

Isaac's 76-yard touchdown run was Michigan's longest since Denard Robinson went for 79 yards against Air Force in 2012 and the longest by a Wolverine running back since Carlos Brown went 90 yards against Eastern Michigan in 2009. The run was also his career long. Houma and Chesson both recorded the first rushing touchdowns of their respective careers. The attendance of over 100,000 was Michigan's 260th consecutive game of over 100,000 in attendance. Michigan's defense held UNLV to only 92 yards of rushing offense.

=== Vs. BYU ===
BYU vs. Michigan

Team	1	2	3	4	Total
#22 Cougars	0	0	0	0	0
• Wolverines	7	24	0	0	31

- Date: September 26
- Location: Michigan Stadium
  Ann Arbor, Michigan
- Game start: 12:05 p.m. EDT
- Elapsed time: 3:08
- Game attendance: 108,940
- Game weather: Mid 70s, Partly cloudy, NE 10–15 MPH
- Referee: Mike Cannon
- TV announcers (ABC): Sean McDonough, Chris Spielman & Todd McShay

Scoring summary
1	6:52	MICH	Jake Rudock 3-yard run (Kenny Allen kick)	MICH 7–0
2	13:37	MICH	Amara Darboh 4-yard pass from Jake Rudock (Kenny Allen kick)	MICH 14–0
2	11:37	MICH	De'Veon Smith 60-yard run (Kenny Allen kick)	MICH 21–0
2	6:57	MICH	Jake Rudock 17-yard run (Kenny Allen kick)	MICH 28–0
2	1:02	MICH	Kenny Allen 40-yard field goal	MICH 31–0

Following its game against UNLV, Michigan faced the Brigham Young (BYU) Cougars. This was the first meeting between the schools since the 1984 Holiday Bowl, which saw BYU defeat Michigan to clinch that season's national championship.

Michigan defeated BYU, 31–0. Michigan opened the scoring in the first quarter with a three-yard touchdown run from Jake Rudock and then scored 24 points in the second quarter. Rudock completed a four-yard touchdown pass to Amara Darboh, followed by a 60-yard touchdown run from De'Veon Smith. Rudock added his second rushing touchdown of the game on a 17-yard run, and Kenny Allen added the final points of the game on a 40-yard field goal near the end of the first half. Neither team added any points in the second half.

The win over BYU marked Michigan's first win over a ranked opponent since defeating Notre Dame 41–30 on September 7, 2013, and it was its first shutout against a ranked opponent since defeating Notre Dame 38–0 on September 13, 2003. It was Michigan's first shutout since Illinois in 2012, and the first time BYU had been shut out since a game against Utah in 2003. Michigan's defense held BYU's offense to only 105 yards of total offense. The 55 yards of rushing offense was BYU's lowest total since another Utah game (in 2011) when it only rushed for 11 yards.

=== At Maryland ===
Michigan at Maryland

Team	1	2	3	4	Total
• #22 Wolverines	0	6	15	7	28
Terrapins	0	0	0	0	0

- Date: October 3
- Location: Byrd Stadium
  College Park, Maryland
- Game start: 12:01 p.m. EDT
- Elapsed time: 3:26
- Game attendance: 51,802
- Game weather: 60°F, Rainy
- Referee: Jerry McGinn
- TV announcers (BTN): Kevin Kugler, Matt Millen & Lisa Byington

Scoring summary
2	6:00	MICH	Kenny Allen 30-yard field goal	MICH 3–0
2	0:53	MICH	Kenny Allen 32-yard field goal	MICH 6–0
3	7:59	MICH	Drake Johnson 31-yard pass from Jake Rudock (Khalid Hill pass from Jake Rudock)	MICH 14–0
3	5:07	MICH	Jehu Chesson 66-yard run (Kenny Allen kick)	MICH 21–0
4	6:53	MICH	Drake Johnson 1-yard run (Kenny Allen kick)	MICH 28–0

After its game against BYU, Michigan began the Big Ten portion of its schedule at Maryland. Maryland won the previous meeting 23–16. The game's original kickoff time of 8:00 p.m. was moved forward by eight hours to noon in order to avoid the potential impact of Hurricane Joaquin.

Michigan defeated Maryland, 28–0. After neither team scored in the first quarter, Michigan opened the scoring in the second quarter with a 30-yard field goal by Kenny Allen. Michigan added to its lead with a 32-yard field goal from Allen near the end of the first half, giving Michigan a 6–0 lead at half-time. Michigan added to its lead in the third quarter with a 31-yard touchdown pass from Jake Rudock to Drake Johnson, and then added a two-point conversion via a Rudock pass to Khalid Hill. Michigan added to its lead with a 66-yard touchdown run from Jehu Chesson before Johnson added the final points of the game in the fourth quarter via a one-yard touchdown run, his second of the game.

The win marked Michigan's first consecutive shutouts since 2000, when Michigan shut out Indiana after shutting out Michigan State the previous week. Michigan's defense forced 12 three-and-outs, and had, as of the end of the game, shut out opponents in 14 of the last 16 quarters it had played. Blake O'Neill placed a punt within the opponent's five yard line for the fourth time in five games. Jourdan Lewis and Desmond Morgan recorded their first interceptions of the season, while Jeremy Clark recorded his third of the year.

=== Vs. Northwestern ===
Northwestern at Michigan
(Homecoming game)

Team	1	2	3	4	Total
#13 Wildcats	0	0	0	0	0
• #18 Wolverines	21	7	3	7	38

- Date: October 10
- Location: Michigan Stadium
  Ann Arbor, Michigan
- Game start: 3:42 EDT
- Elapsed time: 3:07
- Game attendance: 110,452
- Game weather: Mid 60s, Mostly sunny, WNW 10 MPH
- Referee: Ron Snodgrass
- TV announcers (BTN): Kevin Kugler, Matt Millen & Lisa Byington

Scoring summary
1	14:47	MICH	Jehu Chesson 96-yard kick return (Kenny Allen kick)	MICH 7–0
1	10:20	MICH	Drake Johnson 1-yard run (Kenny Allen kick)	MICH 14–0
1	2:35	MICH	Jake Rudock 2-yard run (Kenny Allen kick)	MICH 21–0
2	3:20	MICH	Jourdan Lewis 37-yard interception return (Kenny Allen kick)	MICH 28–0
3	10:14	MICH	Kenny Allen 47-yard field goal	MICH 31–0
4	2:14	MICH	Derrick Green 4-yard run (Kenny Allen kick)	MICH 38–0

Following its game against Maryland, Michigan hosted the Northwestern Wildcats for its homecoming game. Michigan won the previous meeting 10–9 in a turnover filled game by stopping Northwestern's attempted go-ahead two-point conversion with three seconds remaining in the game.

Michigan posted its third consecutive shutout, defeating Northwestern 38–0. Michigan opened the scoring on the first play of the game with a 96-yard opening kickoff return for a touchdown by Jehu Chesson. Michigan added to its lead with a one-yard touchdown run from Drake Johnson, and a two-yard touchdown run from Jake Rudock, giving Michigan a 21–0 lead after the first quarter. In the second quarter Jourdan Lewis posted a 37-yard interception return for a touchdown, which made the score 28–0 in favor of Michigan at half-time. Michigan added to its lead in the third quarter via a career-long 47-yard field goal by Kenny Allen, before Derrick Green added the final points of the game in the fourth quarter via a four-yard touchdown run.

The win marked Michigan's third consecutive shutout, a feat not accomplished by any Football Bowl Subdivision team since Kansas State in 1995. It was also the first time a Michigan team had recorded three consecutive shutouts since 1980, when Michigan shut out Indiana, Wisconsin and Purdue. Michigan has outscored its opposition, 97–0, over its last three games, and not allowed a point over 41 straight defensive possessions. The Wolverines scored at least one touchdown on offense, defense and special teams in the same game for the first time since 2003. Chesson's opening kickoff return for a touchdown was the 11th kick return for a touchdown in program history, and the first opening kickoff return for a touchdown since 1992, when Tyrone Wheatley returned the opening kickoff against Houston.

=== Vs. Michigan State ===
Michigan State at Michigan
(Paul Bunyan Trophy)

Team	1	2	3	4	Total
• #7 Spartans	0	7	7	13	27
#12 Wolverines	0	10	10	3	23

- Date: October 17
- Location: Michigan Stadium
  Ann Arbor, Michigan
- Game start: 3:35 p.m. EDT
- Elapsed time: 3:46
- Game attendance: 111,740
- Game weather: Mid 40s, Mostly cloudy, NW 12–14 MPH
- Referee: John O'Neill
- TV announcers (ESPN): Sean McDonough, Chris Spielman & Todd McShay

Scoring summary
2	13:13	MICH	Sione Houma 2-yard run (Kenny Allen kick)	MICH 7–0
2	7:06	MSU	LJ Scott 11-yard run (Michael Geiger kick)	Tie 7–7
2	5:34	MICH	Kenny Allen 38-yard field goal	MICH 10–7
3	9:17	MICH	Sione Houma 1-yard run (Kenny Allen kick)	MICH 17–7
3	7:07	MSU	Macgarrett Kings Jr. 30-yard pass from Connor Cook (Michael Geiger kick)	MICH 17–14
3	2:06	MICH	Kenny Allen 21-yard field goal	MICH 20–14
4	9:25	MICH	Kenny Allen 38-yard field goal	MICH 23–14
4	8:56	MSU	LJ Scott 1-yard run (Michael Geiger kick)	MICH 23–21
4	0:00	MSU	Jalen Watts-Jackson 38-yard fumble recovery	MSU 27–23

Following its clash with Northwestern, Michigan hosted its in-state rival, the Michigan State Spartans, for the Paul Bunyan Trophy. Michigan was dominated in the previous meeting, losing 35–11. Due to the quality of and the hype surrounding the matchup between the two teams, the game was selected as the location for ESPN's College GameDay. This was the first time that GameDay came to Ann Arbor since Michigan defeated Notre Dame in 2013.

Michigan State defeated Michigan 27–23. Michigan opened the scoring in the second quarter with a two-yard touchdown run from Sione Houma, Michigan State responded with an 11-yard touchdown run from LJ Scott. A 38-yard field goal by Kenny Allen gave Michigan a 10–7 lead at half-time. Michigan added to its lead in the third quarter with a one-yard touchdown run from Houma, his second rushing touchdown of the game. Michigan State responded via a 30-yard touchdown pass from Connor Cook to Macgarrett Kings Jr. A 21-yard field goal by Allen in the final minutes of the third gave Michigan a 20–14 lead after the third quarter. Michigan added to its lead in the fourth quarter with a 38-yard field goal by Allen, but Michigan State responded with a one-yard touchdown run from Scott, his second rushing touchdown of the game, to cut Michigan's lead to two points. With 10 seconds left in the game, Michigan State recovered a fumbled snap on a punt by Blake O'Neill, allowing Jalen Watts-Jackson to return the snap 38 yards for a game-winning touchdown as time expired. Michigan State became the second team in the last two seasons to win a game in regulation in which it did not have the lead until the clock hit 0:00. Last season, Arizona beat California on a game-ending Hail Mary after not having the lead the entire game.

Michigan's defensive streaks of 13 straight shutout quarters and 46 consecutive scoreless drives ended when Michigan State scored a touchdown with 7:06 left in the second quarter. Jourdan Lewis matched a program record with six pass breakups, tying Marlin Jackson, who accomplished the feat against the Washington on August 31, 2002. He owns a total of 14 pass breakups on the season, placing him tied for fourth among Michigan's single-season leaders in the category. Blake O'Neill's 80-yard punt is the longest punt by any FBS punter so far this season and the second longest in Michigan program history, trailing only Monte Robbins' 82-yard punt at Hawaii on December 6, 1986.

=== At Minnesota ===
Michigan at Minnesota
(Little Brown Jug)

Team	1	2	3	4	Total
• #15 Wolverines	7	7	7	8	29
Golden Gophers	3	13	7	3	26

- Date: October 31
- Location: TCF Bank Stadium
  Minneapolis
- Game start: 7:00 p.m. EDT
- Elapsed time: 3:32
- Game attendance: 50,709
- Game weather: 50°F, Clearing skies, SW 9 MPH
- Referee: Dan Capron
- TV announcers (ESPN): Brad Nessler, Todd Blackledge & Holly Rowe

Scoring summary
1	4:47	MINN	Ryan Santoso 23-yard field goal	MINN 3–0
1	0:38	MICH	Joe Kerridge 1-yard run (Kenny Allen kick)	MICH 7–3
2	12:14	MICH	Jehu Chesson 13-yard pass from Jake Rudock (Kenny Allen kick)	MICH 14–3
2	7:36	MINN	Ryan Santoso 30-yard field goal	MICH 14–6
2	4:17	MINN	Rashad Still 52-yard pass from Mitch Leidner (Ryan Santoso kick)	MICH 14–13
2	0:00	MINN	Ryan Santoso 32-yard field goal	MINN 16–14
3	11:22	MICH	J. Peppers 6-yard run (Kenny Allen kick)	MICH 21–16
3	5:49	MINN	Mitch Leidner 24-yard run (Ryan Santoso kick)	MINN 23–21
4	11:43	MINN	Ryan Santoso 47-yard field goal	MINN 26–21
4	4:57	MICH	Jehu Chesson 12-yard pass from Wilton Speight (Amara Darboh pass from Wilton Speight)	MICH 29–26

After its game against Michigan State and a bye week, Michigan traveled to Minneapolis to face the Minnesota Golden Gophers for the Little Brown Jug. In the previous meeting, Minnesota dominated Michigan, winning 30–14.

Michigan defeated Minnesota, 29–26. Minnesota opened the scoring in the first quarter with a 23-yard field goal from Ryan Santoso. Michigan responded with 14 straight points via a one-yard touchdown run from Joe Kerridge near the end of the first quarter and a 13-yard touchdown pass from Jake Rudock to Jehu Chesson. Minnesota responded with 13 unanswered points of its own via a 30-yard field goal from Santoso, a 52-yard touchdown pass from Mitch Leidner to Rashad Still, and a 32-yard field goal from Santoso, which made the score 16–14 in favor of Minnesota at half-time. Michigan regained the lead in the third quarter when Jabrill Peppers scored his first career offensive touchdown with a five-yard rush, but Minnesota regained the lead with a 24-yard touchdown run from Leidner. Minnesota extended its lead in the fourth quarter with a 47-yard field goal from Santoso, but Michigan regained the lead with a 12-yard touchdown pass from Wilton Speight—who had replaced an injured Rudock at quarterback earlier in the half—to Jehu Chesson. Speight then completed a two-point conversion attempt with a pass to Amara Darboh, giving Michigan a three-point lead. Minnesota drove to Michigan's one-yard line on its ensuing possession, but Michigan's defense stopped both Golden Gopher attempts from the one-yard line and held on for the win as time expired.

The Michigan defense has surrendered 11 total red-zone possessions to opposing offenses. Those 11 possessions have amounted to just five touchdowns and four field goals, including three field goals in three trips by Minnesota. Jourdan Lewis had one pass breakup to give him 17 on the season, trailing the all-time single-season record held by Marlin Jackson (2002) and Leon Hall (2006) by one.

=== Vs. Rutgers ===
Rutgers at Michigan

Team	1	2	3	4	Total
Scarlet Knights	3	13	0	0	16
• #16 Wolverines	14	21	11	3	49

- Date: November 7
- Location: Michigan Stadium
  Ann Arbor, Michigan
- Game start: 3:42 EST
- Elapsed time: 3:22
- Game attendance: 109,879
- Game weather: Mid 50s, Partly cloudy, N 15–20 MPH
- Referee: Mike Cannon
- TV announcers (BTN): Kevin Kugler, Matt Millen & Lisa Byington

Scoring summary
1	8:03	MICH	Jehu Chesson 13-yard pass from Jake Rudock (Kenny Allen kick)	MICH 7–0
1	4:43	RU	Kyle Federico 32-yard field goal	MICH 7–3
1	0:15	MICH	Jake Rudock 4-yard run (Kenny Allen kick)	MICH 14–3
2	10:42	MICH	J. Peppers 18-yard run (Kenny Allen kick)	MICH 21–3
2	10:29	RU	Janarion Grant 98-yard kickoff return (Kyle Federico kick)	MICH 21–10
2	8:06	MICH	Drake Johnson 1-yard run (Kenny Allen kick)	MICH 28–10
2	4:00	RU	Kyle Federico 29-yard field goal	MICH 28–13
2	2:00	MICH	Amara Darboh 8-yard pass from Jake Ruddock (Kenny Allen kick)	MICH 35–13
2	0:00	RU	Kyle Federico 27-yard field goal	MICH 35–16
3	11:40	MICH	De'Veon Smith 4-yard run (Jake Ruddock rush)	MICH 43–16
3	6:53	MICH	Kenny Allen 34-yard field goal	MICH 46–16
4	13:29	MICH	Kenny Allen 28-yard field goal	MICH 49–16

After facing Minnesota, Michigan hosted Rutgers. Rutgers won the previous meeting by a score of 26–24.

Michigan defeated Rutgers 49–16. Michigan opened the scoring in the first quarter via a 13-yard touchdown pass from Jake Ruddock to Jehu Chesson. Rutgers responded with a 32-yard field goal by Kyle Federico, but Michigan added to its lead with 14 unanswered points: seven in the first via a four-yard touchdown run from Jake Ruddock, and seven in the second quarter via an 18-yard touchdown run from Jabrill Peppers. Rutgers responded with a 98-yard kickoff return by Janarion Grant, to cut Michigan's lead to 21–10. Michigan added to its lead via a 1-yard touchdown run from Drake Johnson, but Rutgers responded with a 29-yard field by Kyle Federico. Michigan added to its lead via an eight-yard touchdown pass from Jake Ruddock to Amara Darboh, but Rutgers responded with a 27-yard field goal to end the first half, which made the score 35–16 in favor of Michigan at half-time. Michigan held Rutgers scoreless during the second half and added to its lead with 14 unanswered points via a 4-yard touchdown run from De'Veon Smith and a two-point conversion run by Jake Ruddock, a 34-yard field goal by Kenny Allen, and a 28-yard field goal by Allen in the fourth quarter.

With his 18th and 19th pass breakups of the season, Jourdan Lewis claimed sole ownership of the single-season Michigan record, which had previously been shared by Leon Hall and Marlin Jackson. Michigan has allowed just 16 red-zone possessions to opponents all season long, the fewest in FBS, allowing points on 15 of those drives, including just six touchdowns allowed. Jake Rudock passed for 337 yards, a career best and his first 300-yard performance at Michigan. Rudock's yardage was the 12th-highest single-game total in Michigan history.

=== At Indiana ===
Michigan at Indiana

Team	1	2	3	4	OT	2OT	Total
• #15 Wolverines	7	17	0	10	7	7	48
Hoosiers	6	10	10	8	7	0	41

- Date: November 14
- Location: Memorial Stadium
  Bloomington, Indiana
- Game start: 3:35 EST
- Elapsed time: 4:10
- Game attendance: 49,557
- Game weather: 58°F, Sunny, SW 8 MPH
- Referee: Don Willard
- TV announcers (ABC/ESPN2): Bob Wischusen, Brock Huard & Shannon Spake

Scoring summary
1	10:47	MICH	Jehu Chesson 34-yard pass from Jake Rudock (Kenny Allen kick)	MICH 7–0
1	6:52	IND	Griffin Oakes 39-yard field goal	MICH 7–3
1	0:00	IND	Griffin Oakes 36-yard field goal	MICH 7–6
2	8:51	MICH	Jehu Chesson 15-yard pass from Jake Rudock (Kenny Allen kick)	MICH 14–6
2	6:11	IND	Griffin Oakes 51-yard field goal	MICH 14–9
2	5:18	MICH	Jehu Chesson 64-yard pass from Jake Rudock (Kenny Allen kick)	MICH 21–9
2	0:49	IND	Jordan Howard 7-yard pass from Nate Sudfeld (Griffin Oakes kick)	MICH 21–16
2	0:00	MICH	Kenny Allen 22-yard field goal	MICH 24–16
3	13:23	IND	Mitchell Paige 51-yard punt return (Griffin Oakes kick)	MICH 24–23
3	7:40	IND	Griffin Oakes 24-yard field goal	IND 26–24
4	6:30	MICH	Kenny Allen 20-yard field goal	MICH 27–26
4	2:52	IND	Jordan Howard 24-yard run (Jordan Howard run for two-point conversion)	IND 34–27
4	0:02	MICH	Jehu Chesson 5-yard pass from Jake Rudock (Kenny Allen kick)	Tie 34–34
1OT	0:00	IND	Jordan Howard 1-yard run (Griffin Oakes kick)	IND 41–34
1OT	0:00	MICH	Jake Butt 21-yard pass from Jake Rudock (Kenny Allen kick)	Tie 41–41
2OT	0:00	MICH	Amara Darboh 25-yard pass from Jake Rudock (Kenny Allen kick)	MICH 48–41

After hosting Rutgers, Michigan traveled to Bloomington, Indiana to face the Indiana Hoosiers. Michigan dominated the previous meeting, winning 34–10.

Michigan survived an upset bid from Indiana, defeating the Hoosiers 48–41 in double overtime. Michigan opened the scoring in the first quarter with a 34-yard touchdown pass from Jake Rudock to Jehu Chesson, which became a routine connection for Michigan touchdowns in the game. Indiana responded with two field goals in the first quarter from Griffin Oakes: one from 39 yards and one from 36 yards. Michigan extended its lead to eight points in the second quarter with a 15-yard touchdown pass from Rudock to Chesson, but Indiana reduced Michigan's lead to five with a 51-yard field goal from Oakes. Michigan responded under a minute later with a 64-yard touchdown pass from Rudock to Chesson, extending its lead to 12, but Indiana responded with a seven-yard touchdown pass from Nate Sudfeld to Jordan Howard. Michigan added a 22-yard field goal from Kenny Allen as time expired in the first half, making the score 24–16 in favor of Michigan at half-time. Indiana reduced Michigan's lead to one point in the third quarter with a 51-yard punt return for a touchdown from Mitchell Paige, and then took its first lead of the game with a 24-yard field goal from Oakes. Michigan regained the lead in the fourth quarter with a 20-yard field goal from Allen, but Indiana responded with a 24-yard touchdown run from Howard. Howard also converted Indiana's two-point conversion attempt, giving Indiana a seven-point lead with just under three minutes remaining in the game. Michigan responded by driving down the field and tying the game with two seconds left on a five-yard touchdown pass from Rudock to Chesson, Chesson's fourth touchdown reception of the game. The teams traded touchdowns in the first overtime, with Howard rushing for a one-yard touchdown for Indiana and Jake Butt catching a 21-yard touchdown pass from Rudock. Michigan took the lead in the second overtime via a 25-yard touchdown pass from Rudock to Amara Darboh, and then managed to stop Indiana on a fourth-and-goal attempt from the two-yard line to win the game.

The victory against Indiana was Michigan's 20th consecutive victory against the Hoosiers. Michigan set a new season high in offense, totaling 581 yards during the game. Rudock's six touchdown passes set a new school record, surpassing the previous record of four. Rudock threw for over 300-yards in the second consecutive game, becoming the first Michigan quarterback to do so since Chad Henne in 2004. Rudock passed for 440 yards, setting a new career high for the second week in a row. Rudock's yardage was the third-highest single-game total in Michigan history. Rudock's 33 completions are tied for the second most in a game in Michigan history. Chesson's four touchdown receptions tied the school record, which was set by Derrick Alexander in 1992. Chesson set single-game career highs in receptions (10), receiving yards (207), and touchdowns (4). Chesson's four touchdown receptions marked the 14th time in Michigan history that a wide receiver recorded at least three touchdowns in one game, and the first time since Devin Funchess last season. Michigan's defense allowed a season-high 527 yards of offense during the game. Jourdan Lewis extended his record of pass break ups during the season to 20 in total, and leads the nation in pass breakups per game (2.0).

=== At Penn State ===
Michigan at Penn State

Team	1	2	3	4	Total
• #14 Wolverines	7	7	7	7	28
Nittany Lions	3	7	0	6	16

- Date: November 21
- Location: Beaver Stadium
  State College, Pennsylvania
- Game start: 12:05 EST
- Elapsed time: 3:25
- Game attendance: 107,418
- Game weather: 45–49, Mix of clouds, sun, SE 6–10 MPH
- Referee: Ron Snodgrass
- TV announcers (ABC): Bob Wischusen, Brock Huard & Shannon Spake

Scoring summary
1	11:09	PSU	Tyler Davis 23-yard field goal	PSU 3–0
1	7:43	MICH	Jake Butt 26-yard pass from Jake Rudock (Kenny Allen kick)	MICH 7–3
2	2:01	PSU	Saeed Blacknall 25-yard pass from Christian Hackenberg (Tyler Davis Kick)	PSU 10–7
2	0:51	MICH	Amara Darboh 11-yard pass from Jake Rudock (Kenny Allen kick)	MICH 14–10
3	6:07	MICH	Sione Houma 1-yard run (Kenny Allen kick)	MICH 21–10
4	14:02	PSU	Tyler Davis 24-yard field goal	MICH 21–13
4	8:05	PSU	Tyler Davis 18-yard field goal	MICH 21–16
4	5:12	MICH	De'Veon Smith 1-yard run (Kenny Allen Kick)	MICH 28–16

Following its game against Indiana, Michigan played its final road game against Penn State. Michigan won the previous meeting by a score of 18–13.

Michigan defeated Penn State, 28–16. Penn State opened the scoring in the first quarter with a 23-yard field goal from Tyler Davis, but Michigan took the lead with a 26-yard touchdown pass from Jake Rudock to Jake Butt. Penn State regained the lead in the second quarter with a 25-yard touchdown pass from Christian Hackenberg to Saeed Blacknail, but Michigan responded with an 11-yard touchdown pass from Rudock to Amara Darboh, which made the score 14–10 in favor of Michigan at half-time. Michigan added the only score in the third quarter with a one-yard touchdown run from Sione Houma, which extended Michigan's lead to 11 points. Penn State reduced Michigan's lead to five points in the fourth quarter with two field goals from Davis, one from 24-yards, and one from 18-yards. Michigan added the final points of the game in the fourth quarter via a one-yard touchdown run from De'Veon Smith.

Michigan won at Beaver Stadium for the first time since 2006; it had lost the previous three times when traveling to Penn State. Michigan also became the first team this season to defeat Penn State at home. Jake Rudock became the first quarterback in Michigan history to throw for at least 250 yards in three consecutive games. Michigan's offensive line held Penn State to only two sacks. The Nittany Lions came into the game having the most sacks in Division I FBS and had averaged 4.2 sacks per game. Michigan has allowed the opposition only 25 red-zone chances, the fewest in FBS. Jourdan Lewis added to his Michigan single-season record with one more pass breakup, giving him 21 on the year. With the win, Michigan completed its first perfect Big Ten road season since 1997.

=== Vs. Ohio State ===
Ohio State at Michigan
(The Game)

Team	1	2	3	4	Total
• #8 Buckeyes	7	7	14	14	42
#12 Wolverines	0	10	0	3	13

- Date: November 28
- Location: Michigan Stadium
  Ann Arbor, Michigan
- Game start: 12:06 p.m. EST
- Elapsed time: 3:24
- Game attendance: 111,829
- Game weather: Low 40s, Mostly cloudy, N 5–10 MPH
- Referee: Jerry McGinn
- TV announcers (ABC): Brad Nessler, Todd Blackledge & Holly Rowe

Scoring summary
1	1:05	OSU	J.T. Barrett 7-yard run (Sean Nuernberger kick)	OSU 7–0
2	9:25	MICH	Kenny Allen 25-yard field goal	OSU 7–3
2	5:01	OSU	Ezekiel Elliott 5-yard Run (Sean Nuernberger kick)	OSU 14–3
2	1:00	MICH	Jehu Chesson 5-yard pass from Jake Rudock (Kenny Allen Kick)	OSU 14–10
3	12:21	OSU	Jalin Marshall 25-yard pass from J.T. Barrett (Sean Nuernberger Kick)	OSU 21–10
3	1:45	OSU	J.T. Barrett 13-yard Run (Sean Nuernberger kick)	OSU 28–10
4	14:44	MICH	Kenny Allen 27-yard field goal	OSU 28–13
4	12:53	OSU	Ezekiel Elliott 10-yard run (Sean Nuernberger kick)	OSU 35–13
4	8:43	OSU	J.T. Barrett 17-yard run (Sean Nuernberger kick)	OSU 42–13

Following its road finale against Penn State, Michigan faced its arch-rivals, the Ohio State Buckeyes, in the 112th meeting of "The Game." Ohio State won the previous meeting by a score of 42–28. Prior to the game, Michigan retired six numbers that were previously a part of the "Michigan Legends" program. The numbers were 11 (worn by the Wistert Brothers—Al Wistert, Alvin Wistert, and Whitey Wistert), 21 (worn by Desmond Howard), 47 (worn by Bennie Oosterbaan), 48 (worn by Gerald Ford), 87 (worn by Ron Kramer), and 98 (worn by Tom Harmon). Howard's Number 21 jersey will officially be retired, as his was the only jersey of the six that was not formally retired at Michigan prior to the implementation of the legends program.

Ohio State defeated Michigan, 42–13. Ohio State opened the scoring in the first quarter with a seven-yard touchdown run from J. T. Barrett, but Michigan responded with a 25-yard field goal by Kenny Allen. Ohio State extended its lead in the second quarter via a five-yard touchdown run from Ezekiel Elliott. Michigan responded with a five-yard touchdown pass from Jake Rudock to Jehu Chesson, making the score 14–10 in favor of Ohio State at half-time. Ohio State responded with 14 unanswered points in the third quarter, via a 25-yard touchdown pass from Barrett to Jalin Marshall, and a 13-yard touchdown run from Barrett. Michigan responded in the fourth quarter with a 27-yard field goal by Allen. Ohio State added to its lead in the fourth quarter with 14 unanswered points via a 10-yard touchdown run from Elliott and a 17-yard touchdown run from Barrett.

Jake Rudock became the first quarterback in Michigan history to throw for at least 250 yards in four consecutive games. With 2,739 passing yards this season, Rudock moved to fifth place among Michigan's all-time single-season leaders. With 620 receiving yards this season, Jake Butt moved to third place among Michigan's all-time single-season leaders in receiving yards by a tight end. The announced attendance of 111,829 marked the 265th consecutive game of more than 100,000 fans in attendance, and was the largest crowd of 2015.

=== Vs. Florida ===
Michigan vs. Florida
(Citrus Bowl)

Team	1	2	3	4	Total
• #17 Wolverines	7	10	14	10	41
#19 Gators	7	0	0	0	7

- Date: January 1
- Location: Orlando Citrus Bowl
  Orlando, Florida
- Game start: 1:06 EST
- Elapsed time: 3:19
- Game attendance: 63,113
- Game weather: 83°F, Partly cloudy, W 5 MPH
- Referee: Duane Heydt
- TV announcers (ABC): Mike Patrick, Ed Cunningham & Jerry Punch

Scoring summary
1	5:54	MICH	Drake Johnson 5-yard run (Kenny Allen kick)	MICH 7–0
1	1:58	UF	Treon Harris 2-yard pass from Antonio Callaway (Neil MacInnes kick)	Tie 7–7
2	8:49	MICH	Jehu Chesson 31-yard pass from Jake Rudock (Kenny Allen kick)	MICH 14–7
2	1:01	MICH	Kenny Allen 21-yard field goal	MICH 17–7
3	8:47	MICH	Grant Perry 3-yard pass from Jake Rudock (Kenny Allen kick)	MICH 24–7
3	3:48	MICH	Sione Houma 1-yard run (Kenny Allen kick)	MICH 31–7
4	12:32	MICH	Drake Johnson 8-yard pass from Jake Rudock (Kenny Allen kick)	MICH 38–7
2	6:42	MICH	Kenny Allen 25-yard field goal	MICH 41–7

On December 6, Michigan was selected to play in the Citrus Bowl against the Florida Gators. Michigan won the previous meeting, in the 2008 Capital One Bowl, by a score of 41–35. This was Michigan's 44th bowl game appearance, and fifth appearance in the Citrus Bowl.

Michigan dominated Florida, winning 41–7. Michigan opened the scoring in the first quarter with a four-yard touchdown run from Drake Johnson. Florida responded with a two-yard touchdown pass from Antonio Callaway to Treon Harris, but that would be its only score of the game, as Michigan responded with 34 unanswered points. Michigan regained the lead in the second quarter with a 31-yard touchdown pass from Jake Rudock to Jehu Chesson, and then added a 21-yard field goal from Kenny Allen, making the score 17–7 in favor of Michigan at half-time. Michigan added to its lead in the third quarter via a three-yard touchdown pass from Rudock to Grant Perry and a two-yard touchdown run from Sione Houma, making the score 31–7 after three quarters. Michigan added ten more points in the fourth quarter via an eight-yard touchdown pass from Rudock to Johnson, before Allen added the final points of the game via a 25-yard field goal.

Rudock was named the game MVP, as voted by the media. Jake Rudock became the first quarterback in Michigan history to throw for at least 250 yards in five consecutive games. Rudock completed 20-of-31 passes for 278 yards and three touchdowns, becoming just the second Michigan quarterback to throw for 3,000 yards in a single season, following John Navarre in 2003. Rudock finished his season ranked No. 2 in single-season passing yards (3,017) and No. 1 in single-season completion percentage (64 percent). With three receptions for 34 yards, tight end Jake Butt finishes the season ranked No. 2 in single-season receptions (51) by a Michigan tight end and No. 3 in receiving yards by a tight end (654). Michigan's 41 points marked the most that Florida had allowed this season. The win marked Michigan's second-largest scoring margin in a bowl game since the 1948 Rose Bowl (49–0 win over USC). The largest since that game came in a 42–7 win over NC State in the 1994 Hall of Fame Bowl. The attendance of 63,113 was the highest Citrus Bowl attendance figure since the 2008 Capital One Bowl, also between Michigan and Florida.

== Roster ==
2015 Michigan Wolverines football team roster
Players
Coaches
Offense

Pos.	#	Name	Class
QB	3	Wilton Speight	So
RB	4	De'Veon Smith	Jr
QB	5	John O'Korn	Jr
QB	6	Brian Cleary	Sr
QB	7	Shane Morris	Jr
TE	8	Tyrone Wheatley Jr.	Fr
WR	9	Grant Perry	Fr
WR	10	Da'Mario Jones	Jr
QB	10	Zach Gentry	Fr
QB	12	Alex Malzone	Fr
QB	13	Matt Thompson	So
WR	14	Drake Harris	So
QB	15	Jake Rudock	RSr
QB	16	Garrett Moores	Jr
WR	16	Jack Wangler	Jr
WR	17	Freddy Canteen	So
RB	18	Antonio Whitfield	Jr
TE	19	Henry Poggi	So
RB	20	Drake Johnson	Sr
RB	22	Karan Higdon	Fr
RB	22	Joe Hewlett	So
RB	23	Jordan Glasgow	Fr
RB	24	Kevin Gross	Fr
RB	27	Derrick Green	Jr
RB	29	Ross Douglas	Jr
FB	30	Joe Beneducci	So
RB	32	Ty Isaac	Jr
RB	33	Wyatt Shallman	Jr
FB	34	Deyanco Hardwick	So
FB	36	Joe Kerridge (C)	RSr
FB	37	Bobby Henderson	Sr
FB	39	Sione Houma	Sr
WR	40	Kenneth Sloss	Jr
FB	40	Nick Volk	So
WR	41	Brian Cole II	Fr
TE	44	Chase Winovich	So
OL	51	Greg Froelich	Jr
OL	52	Mason Cole	So
OL	55	David Dawson	Jr
OL	57	William Coleman	Fr
OL	57	Patrick Kugler	Jr
OL	61	Graham Glasgow	RSr
OL	62	Blake Bars	Sr
OL	63	Ben Pliska	Sr
OL	67	Kyle Kalis	Sr
OL	70	Nolan Ulizio	Fr
OL	71	Ben Braden	Sr
OL	72	Logan Tuley-Tillman	Jr
OL	75	Jon Runyan Jr.	Fr
OL	76	Juwann Bushell-Beatty	So
OL	77	Grant Newsome	Fr
OL	78	Erik Magnuson	Sr
TE	80	Khalid Hill	Jr
TE	81	Michael Jocz	Jr
WR	82	Amara Darboh	Sr
WR	83	Jaron Dukes	Jr
TE	84	A.J. Williams	Sr
WR	85	Maurice Ways	So
WR	86	Jehu Chesson	Sr
TE	88	Jake Butt	Jr
TE	88	Jack Dunaway	Fr
WR	89	Brad Anlauf	Sr
TE	89	Ian Bunting	RFr

Defense

Pos.	#	Name	Class
LB	3	Desmond Morgan	RSr
DE	4	Reuben Jones	Fr
S	5	Jabrill Peppers	So
DB	6	Keith Washington	Fr
DE	7	Shelton Johnson	Fr
CB	8	Channing Stribling	Jr
LB	9	Mike McCray	So
CB	13	Terry Richardson	Sr
LB	14	Allen Gant	Jr
LB	15	James Ross	Sr
DB	17	Tyree Kinnel	Fr
LB	19	Jared Wangler	So
DB	20	Matt Mitchell	So
S	22	Jarrod Wilson	Sr
CB	24	Wayne Lyons	RSr
S	25	Dymonte Thomas	Jr
CB	26	Jourdan Lewis	Jr
LB	27	Chris Terech	Fr
CB	27	Travis Wooley	Sr
DB	28	Brandon Watson	So
DB	29	Ross Douglas	Jr
DB	30	Reon Dawson	Jr
LB	31	Nick Benda	Jr
S	32	Shaun Austin	Sr
DE	33	Taco Charlton	Jr
S	34	Jeremy Clark	Jr
LB	35	Joe Bolden (C)	Sr
DB	38	John Andrysiak	Jr
DB	38	Francois Montbrun	Jr
LB	42	Ben Gedeon	Jr
DL	43	Chris Wormley	Sr
DB	44	Delano Hill	Jr
DL	45	Brady Pallante	So
LB	46	Michael Wroblewski	Jr
CB	49	Anthony Dalimonte	Jr
DE	49	Tom Strobel	Jr
LB	51	Tommy Whitted	Fr
LB	52	Royce Jenkins-Stone	Sr
DE	53	Mario Ojemudia	Sr
LB	54	Dan Liesman	Sr
DL	55	Garrett Miller	Jr
LB	56	Jameson Offerdahl	Fr
LB	58	Alex Kaminski	So
LB	59	Noah Furbush	So
DT	69	Willie Henry	Sr
DT	73	Maurice Hurst Jr.	Jr
DT	90	Bryan Mone	So
LB	92	Cheyenn Robertson	Fr
DE	93	Lawrence Marshall	So
DL	96	Ryan Glasgow	Jr
DE	97	Cody Zeisler	Jr
DT	99	Matt Godin	Jr

Special teams

Pos.	#	Name	Class
K/P	3	Kyle Seychel	Fr
P	12	Blake O'Neill	RSr
K	16	Andrew David	Fr
K/P	41	Ryan Tice	Fr
LS	43	Scott Sypniewski	Jr
LS	50	Andrew Robinson	So
K/P	91	Kenneth Allen	Sr

Head coach

- Jim Harbaugh

Coordinators/assistant coaches

- Tim Drevno (offensive coordinator / offensive line)
- D. J. Durkin (defensive coordinator / linebackers)
- John Baxter (special teams coordinator)
- Jedd Fisch (passing game coordinator / quarterbacks / wide receivers)
- Jay Harbaugh (tight ends)
- Greg Jackson (secondary)
- Greg Mattison (defensive line)
- Kevin Tolbert (strength and conditioning)
- Tyrone Wheatley (running backs)
- Mike Zordich (secondary)
- Matt Doherty (recruiting coordinator)
- Chris Partridge (recruiting coordinator)
- T. J. Weist (Senior Offensive Analyst)
- Matt Barnes (defensive analyst)
- Erik Campbell (Recruiting Operations)
- Rick Finotti (director of football operations)
- Zach Eisendrath (director of Internal Communications and operations)
- Gwendolyn Bush (director Of Player Development)
- Derron Montgomery (wide receiver/graduate assistant)
- Al Netter (offensive graduate assistant)
- Joe Hastings (defensive graduate assistant)
- Drew Terrell (offensive graduate assistant)
- Michael Switzer (offensive analyst)
- Albert Karschnia (Operations Assistant)
- Erin Cronyn (Operations Intern)
- Katie Giarmo (Recruiting Intern)

Legend

- (C) Team captain
- (S) Suspended
- (I) Ineligible
- Injured
- Redshirt

Roster
Last update: September 21, 2015

== Awards and honors ==
Weekly Awards
Player	Award	Date Awarded	Ref.
Jourdan Lewis	Big Ten Defensive Player of the Week	October 12, 2015	
Jehu Chesson	Special Teams Player of the Week	October 12, 2015	
Jabrill Peppers	Co-Freshman of the Week	October 12, 2015	
Jourdan Lewis	Jim Thorpe Player of the Week	October 14, 2015	
Jabrill Peppers	Big Ten Freshman of the Week	November 2, 2015	
Jake Butt	John Mackey Tight End of the Week	November 11, 2015	
Jake Rudock	Co-Big Ten Offensive Player of the Week	November 16, 2015	
Jehu Chesson	Co-Big Ten Offensive Player of the Week	November 16, 2015	

Individual Awards
Player	Award	Ref.
Jabrill Peppers	Thompson-Randel El Big Ten Freshman of the Year	
Jake Butt	Kwalick-Clark Tight End of the Year	

All-American
Player	AP	AFCA	FWAA	TSN	WCFF	Athlon	CBS	Scout	SI.com	USAT
Jourdan Lewis	2		2		2	2		2	1	1
Jake Butt	2			2		2	1	2	1	
Jabrill Peppers				2			2		2	

All-Big Ten
Player	Position	Coaches	Media
Jourdan Lewis	DB	1	1
Jabrill Peppers	DB	1	1
Jake Butt	TE	1	1
Jehu Chesson	WR	1	Hon.
Jabrill Peppers	PR	2	Hon.
Erik Magnuson	OT	3	3
Chris Wormley	DL	3	Hon.
Kenny Allen	K	Hon.	3
Kyle Kalis	OG	Hon.	3
Joe Bolden	LB	Hon.	Hon.
Ryan Glasgow	DL	Hon.	Hon.
Willie Henry	DL	Hon.	Hon.
Desmond Morgan	LB	Hon.	Hon.
Blake O'Neill	P	Hon.	Hon.
Ben Braden	OG	Hon.	Hon.
Mason Cole	C	Hon.	Hon.
Amara Darboh	WR	Hon.	Hon.
Graham Glasgow	OG	Hon.	Hon.
Jake Rudock	QB	Hon.	Hon.
De'Veon Smith	RB	Hon.	–
Jarrod Wilson	DB	Hon.	–
Royce Jenkins-Stone	LB	–	Hon.
Jourdan Lewis	KR	–	Hon.
Hon. = Honorable mention. Reference:

== 2016 NFL draft ==
Three Wolverines were selected in the 2016 NFL draft.

Rnd.	Pick	Team	Player	Pos.	College	Notes
3*	95	Detroit Lions	Graham Glasgow	C	Michigan	
4*	132	Baltimore Ravens	Willie Henry	DT	Michigan	
6	191	Detroit Lions	Jake Rudock	QB	Michigan	
