= Wilton Speight =

American football player (born 1994)

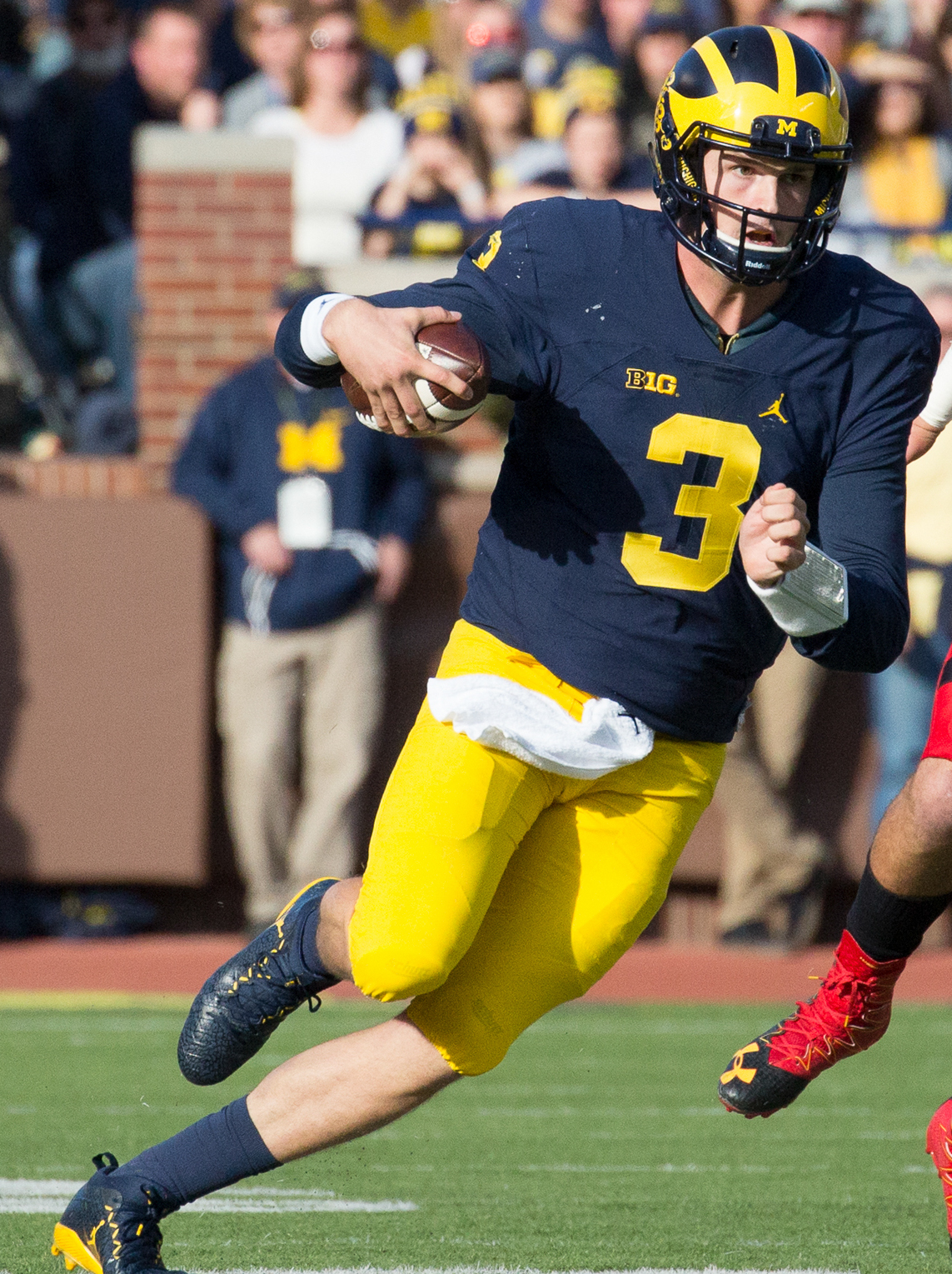
- Speight with Michigan in 2016

Profile
- Position: Quarterback

Personal information
- Born: December 6, 1994 (age 31); Henrico County, Virginia, U.S.
- Listed height: 6 ft 6 in (1.98 m)
- Listed weight: 235 lb (107 kg)

Career information
- High school: Collegiate School (Richmond, Virginia)
- College: Michigan (2014–2017); UCLA (2018)
- NFL draft: 2019: undrafted

Career history
- San Francisco 49ers (2019)*
- * Offseason or practice squad member only

Awards and highlights
- 2014 Under Armour All-America Game team captain; Third-team All-Big Ten (2016)

Robert Wilton Speight III (/speɪt/ SPAYT; born December 6, 1994) is an American former college football player who was a quarterback for the Michigan Wolverines and UCLA Bruins. In high school, he was a 2014 Under Armour All-America Game selection and subsequently committed to play in college for Michigan. Speight redshirted in 2014 and was the backup quarterback in 2015. As a redshirt sophomore in 2016, he started 12 games and earned third-team All-Big Ten honors. In 2017, Speight started four games before suffering a season-ending injury. In April 2018, Speight transferred to UCLA for his final season of eligibility.

He later signed as an undrafted free agent with the San Francisco 49ers in 2019, but did not make the team during final roster cuts, ending his National Football League (NFL) career.

== Early life ==
Speight was born in Henrico County, Virginia, on December 6, 1994. His father, Robert Wilton Speight Jr., played basketball, and his grandfather, Robert Wilton Speight Sr., was a second-team All-American basketball player in 1953 who later had his jersey retired at NC State. Speight is the oldest of three brothers; his younger brothers are Griffin and Jess. Jess earned a scholarship as a third year defensive lineman at Michigan.

Speight played high school football and basketball for the Collegiate School in Richmond, Virginia. He was a highly recruited Virginia high school athlete who was being recruited by the likes of Virginia Tech until a severe collarbone injury during the first game of his fall 2011 junior season that required a metal plate and eight screws to repair caused most schools to lose interest in him. Speight had previously had a medial collateral ligament injury. Speight hired quarterback guru Steve Clarkson to help him regain his form and posted 2,900 yards and 32 touchdowns in ten games during the 2012 season. He was unranked by most services at the time. A few months later after player rankings were reassessed following his second chance at his junior season in 2012, he was the number 7 ranked quarterback in the national class of 2014 according to ESPN. Other ratings services also returned him to their class of 2014 rankings: 16 by Rivals.com and 21 by Scout.com following his reclassification. Speight appeared in the 2014 Under Armour All-America Game, completing two of six passes for 63 yards. He started at quarterback and served as team captain.

In 2014, Speight was named the Collegiate School's Outstanding Senior Athlete, an award given to the "senior boy who has contributed most to the athletic program through leadership, cooperation, sportsmanship and ability."

College recruiting
Name	Hometown	School	Height	Weight	40^{‡}	Commit date
Wilton Speight; QB	Richmond, Virginia	Collegiate (VA)	6 ft 6 in (1.98 m)	235 lb (107 kg)	4.73	Feb 6, 2013
Wilton Speight; QB	Recruit ratings: Rivals: ESPN: (82)					
Overall recruit ranking: Rivals: 27 (VA) ESPN: 257 (national), 13 (QB, pocket passer), 8 (VA)
Note: In many cases, Scout, Rivals, 247Sports, On3, and ESPN may conflict in their listings of height and weight.; In these cases, the average was taken. ESPN grades are on a 100-point scale.; Sources: "Michigan Football Commitments". Rivals.; "2014 Michigan Football Commits". Scout.; "ESPN". ESPN.; "Scout.com Team Recruiting Rankings". Scout.; "2014 Team Ranking". Rivals.com.

== College career ==
=== Michigan ===
==== Commitment and redshirt season ====
In early February 2013, Speight received a scholarship offer, and promptly verbally committed, to play college football at the University of Michigan. On October 16, 2013, he signed his early enrollment letter. In January 2014, he enrolled early at Michigan. He attended Michigan's spring camp in March 2014 under coach Brady Hoke. Speight redshirted his entire freshman season for the 2014 Wolverines as fifth-year senior Devin Gardner led the team.

==== 2015 season ====
As a redshirt freshman for the 2015 Wolverines, Speight began the season as a backup to Jake Rudock and Shane Morris. Speight made his Michigan debut on September 12, 2015, taking kneel-down snaps in the closing minutes of a victory over Oregon State. Asked why he played Speight instead of Morris at the end of the Oregon State game, head coach Jim Harbaugh explained that he did not want to burn Morris's redshirt year on a meaningless snap, emphasizing that Morris remained his No. 2 quarterback.

Harbaugh ultimately decided to redshirt Morris during the 2015 season, resulting in Speight seeing playing time as Rudock's principal backup. Speight failed to complete a pass in three attempts against UNLV on September 19 and in his only pass attempt against Maryland on October 3, 2015.

Speight received his first significant playing time on October 31, 2015, in the Little Brown Jug rivalry game against Minnesota. After Rudock was injured in the third quarter, Speight came into the game. With five minutes remaining and Michigan trailing 26–21, Speight led Michigan on a game-winning drive culminating in 12-yard pass to wide receiver Jehu Chesson and a pass to wide receiver Amara Darboh for a two-point conversion. Speight completed three of six passes for 29 yards and one rush for six yards. The two-point conversion gave Michigan a three-point lead that forced Minnesota into a decision to attempt to score a touchdown on the goal line as time expired. Speight had not completed any passes prior to that game. Harbaugh explained that Speight had earned the backup role in practice in the preceding weeks.

Speight next saw significant playing time against Ohio State on November 28, 2015. After Rudock was injured on a sack by Joey Bosa, Speight came into the game and completed six of 14 passes for 44 yards, but also threw his first college interception on a pass tipped and caught by Bosa. Speight finished his redshirt freshman season with nine completions in 25 attempts, one interception, one touchdown pass, 145 passing yards, and a 36% completion percentage.

==== 2016 season ====
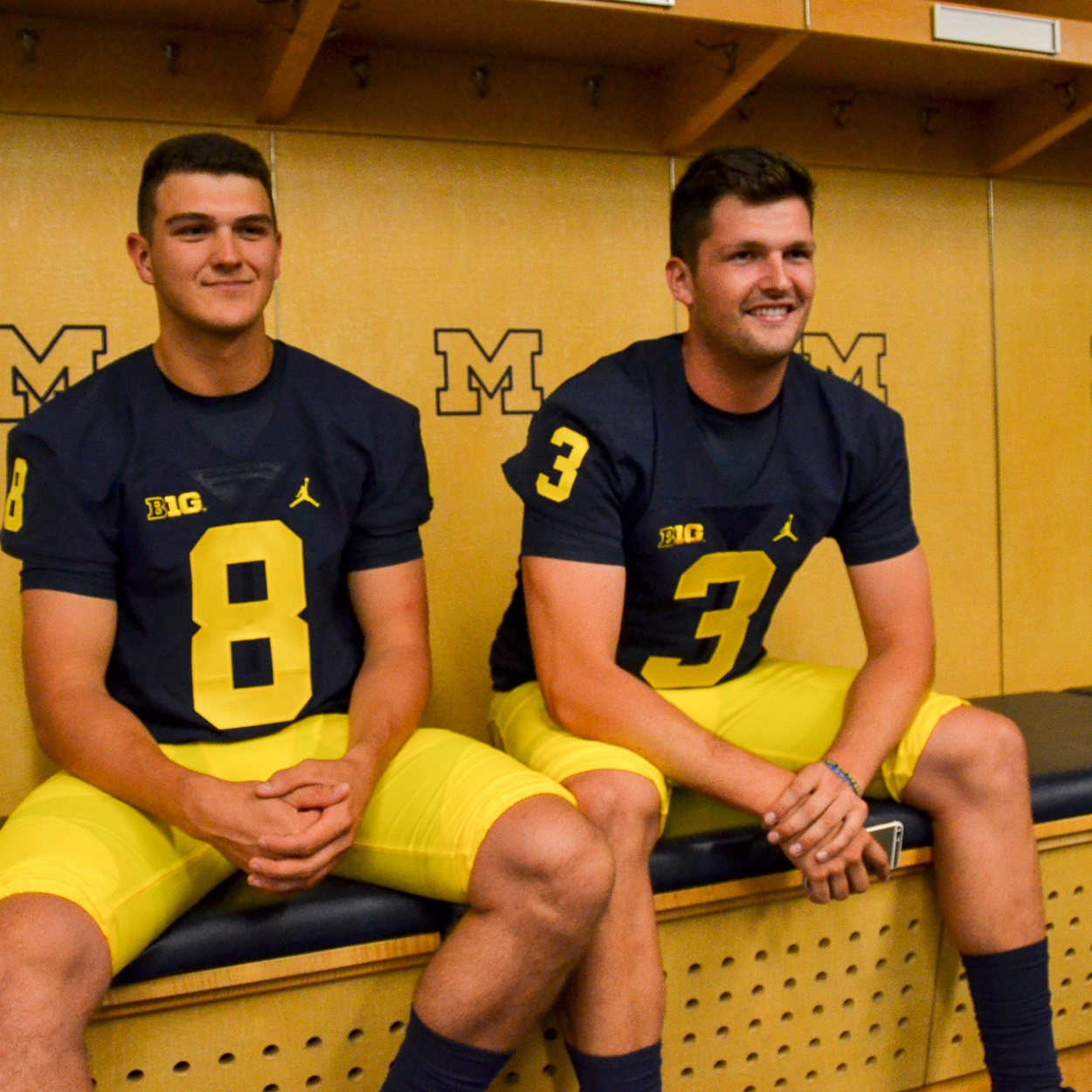
John O'Korn and Speight (right) were part of a preseason quarterback battle

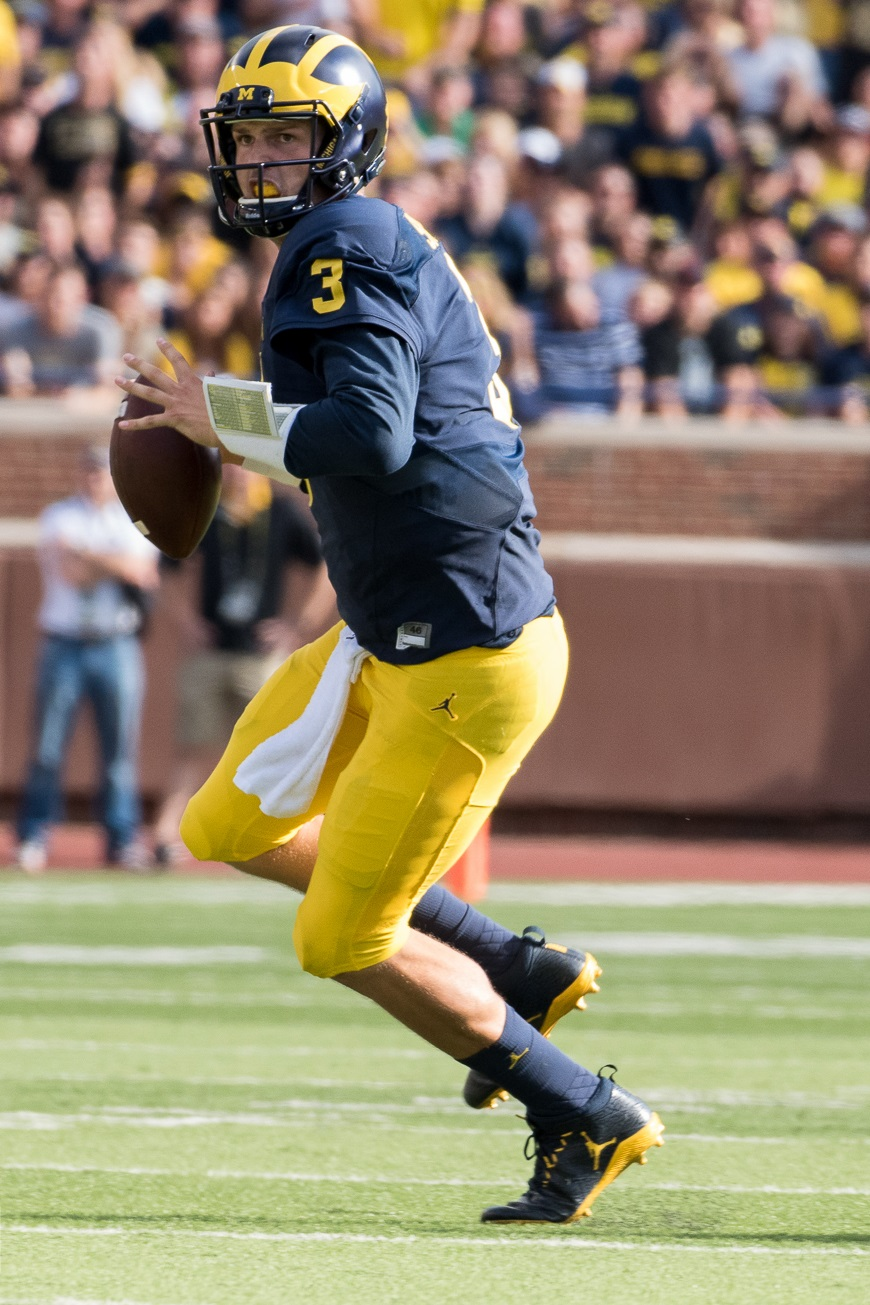
Speight in 2016

Michigan's 2016 spring practice featured a quarterback battle between Speight, redshirt junior John O'Korn, redshirt junior Shane Morris, true freshman Brandon Peters and redshirt freshman Alex Malzone. After spring practice, press reports indicated that Speight, O'Korn and Morris were leading the competition, in that order. O'Korn and Speight were the starters in the April 1 spring game. Speight passed for a touchdown and ran for another leading his team to a 14–13 win.

In August 2016, Speight and O'Korn entered training camp as Michigan's quarterback frontrunners. Coach Harbaugh refused to reveal the identity of his starting quarterback prior to the opening game. On September 3, 2016, Speight was named the starting quarterback. In the opening game, Speight led Michigan to a 63–3 victory over Hawaii. On Michigan's first play from scrimmage, Speight threw an interception on an attempted screen pass to Jake Butt. For the game, he completed 10 of 13 passes for 145 yards with three touchdown passes and one interception.

In his second start on September 10 against UCF, Speight completed 25 of 37 passes for 312 yards with four touchdown passes and no interceptions to earn Big Ten Offensive Player of the Week honors.

On October 1, Speight's tiebreaking fourth quarter touchdown pass to Amara Darboh against #8-ranked Wisconsin lifted Michigan to its first win against a top-10 opponent since the 2008 Wolverines beat the 2008 Badgers, ending a streak of 12 consecutive such losses.

After leading Michigan to a 9–0 start with a 59–3 victory in his career-high 362-yard passing performance against Maryland on November 5, Speight and Michigan lost to Iowa 14–13 on November 12.

Two days later, it was reported that Speight had endured a broken collarbone during the game and was feared lost for the rest of the season.

However, after missing one game against Indiana, Speight returned to the lineup to start against Ohio State in the rivalry game. He posted 2 touchdowns, but had 2 interceptions and a critical fumble in the double-overtime loss. Following the season, Speight was the third team All-Big Ten quarterback selection by both the coaches and the media (behind J. T. Barrett and Trace McSorley).

During the 2016 Capital One Orange Bowl, Speight and the Michigan offense struggled to generate offense against a dominant Florida State defensive line. Michigan managed just 6 points in the first half on two field goals (from kicker Kenny Allen). Michigan rallied late in the game, including Speight's only throwing touchdown of the night, eventually taking a 30–27 lead with 1:57 remaining in the game. The lead was short-lived as Michigan gave up the game-winning touchdown with just 36 seconds remaining in the game. The ensuing Michigan possession ended with Florida State intercepting a Speight pass and running out the clock for a Florida State victory (33–32). For the game, Speight completed 21 of 38 passes (55.3%) for 163 yards with one touchdown and one interception. In 12 starts, Speight finished the year with 2,538 passing yards, 18 touchdowns, 7 interceptions, and completed 61.6 percent of his passes.

==== 2017 season ====
Speight entered training camp in a quarterback competition against redshirt senior O'Korn and redshirt freshman Brandon Peters, with additional competition from true freshman Dylan McCaffrey, redshirt sophomore Alex Malzone, and Mike Sessa.

He won the competition and started Michigan's opener against Florida on September 2, beating the Gators 33–17.

However, Speight endured a back injury on September 23 against Purdue, causing him to be sidelined for several weeks.

On November 13, head coach Jim Harbaugh stated that Speight was cleared to participate in non-contact football activities.

On November 26, 2017, Speight announced he would be transferring from Michigan to play as a graduate transfer at another school.

=== UCLA ===
==== 2018 season ====
On April 12, 2018, Speight announced he would be transferring to UCLA for his final year of eligibility. On August 30, 2018, it was announced that Speight had been named by new head coach Chip Kelly as the starting quarterback for the Bruins' season opener against Cincinnati. Speight suffered a back injury in the opener (an eventual 26–17 loss) and was replaced with true freshman Dorian Thompson-Robinson in the second quarter.

Speight did not see game action again until the Bruins' matchup with the Arizona Wildcats on October 20, when Thompson-Robinson suffered an injury in the second quarter. Speight came in to take his place and completed 17 of 27 passes for 204 yards, two touchdowns, and no interceptions, as the Bruins defeated the Wildcats, 31–30. On November 10, Speight posted a season-high 335 yards passing and 2 touchdowns in a 31–28 loss to Arizona State.

On November 17, Speight completed 13 of 22 passes for 166 yards, one touchdown, and one interception as UCLA defeated its crosstown rival, the USC Trojans, 34–27. He also rushed for a touchdown against the Trojans.

== Professional career ==
Pre-draft measurables
Height	Weight	Arm length	Hand span	40-yard dash	10-yard split	20-yard split
6 ft 6 5/8 in (2.00 m)	232 lb (105 kg)	32 3/8 in (0.82 m)	9 1/2 in (0.24 m)	4.89 s	1.71 s	2.90 s
All values from Pro Day

After going undrafted in the 2019 NFL draft, Speight signed with the San Francisco 49ers. He was waived during final roster cuts on August 31, 2019.

== See also ==
- Michigan Wolverines football statistical leaders
