= Grant Newsome =

American football coach (born 1997)

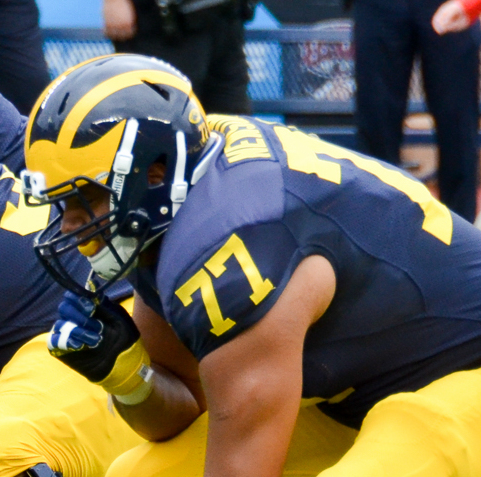
- Newsome playing with the 2015 Michigan Wolverines

New York Giants
- Title: Assistant offensive line coach

Personal information
- Born: March 2, 1997 (age 29); McLean, Virginia, U.S.
- Listed height: 6 ft 7 in (2.01 m)
- Listed weight: 318 lb (144 kg)

Career information
- Position: Offensive tackle
- High school: Lawrenceville School (Trenton, New Jersey)
- College: University of Michigan

Career history
- Michigan; Student assistant (2018–2019); Graduate assistant (2020–2021); Tight ends coach (2022–2023); Offensive line coach (2024–2025); New York Giants; Assistant offensive line coach (2026–present)

Awards and highlights
- CFP national champion (2023)

Grant Newsome (born March 2, 1997) is an American football coach, currently an assistant offensive line coach for the New York Giants of the National Football League (NFL). He was previously an assistant coach at the University of Michigan from 2018 to 2025, and a former Michigan Wolverines football player from 2015 to 2017. Newsome won a national championship with the program in 2023.

== Playing career ==
Coming out of high school, Newsome was rated as a four-star recruit where he decided to commit to play college football for Jim Harbaugh and the Michigan Wolverines over Penn State. Newsome made his debut on October 31, 2015, against Minnesota. Newsome played two seasons with Michigan in 2015 and 2016 but during the 2016 season versus Wisconsin, Newsome suffered a career-ending injury where he dislocated his right knee, fractured his tibia, tore three ligaments, damaged three nerves and destroyed his popliteal artery, causing him to never play again and medically retire in 2018. Before the injury, Newsome started the Wolverines first five games of the 2016 season. He sat out the 2017 season rehabbing in hopes of returning in 2018.

== Coaching career ==
=== Michigan ===
After medically retiring, Newsome served as a student assistant for Michigan in 2018 and 2019. In 2020, Newsome transitioned to a graduate assistant role. In 2022, head coach Jim Harbaugh promoted Newsome to coach the tight ends, where he coached future first-round NFL draft pick Colston Loveland. In 2023, Newsome helped lead the Wolverines to an undefeated season and a national championship. In 2024, new head coach Sherrone Moore promoted Newsome to coach the offensive line. After the 2025 season, head coach Sherrone Moore was fired by Michigan and Newsome was not retained after eight seasons coaching the program and eleven total with Michigan, including his playing years.

=== New York Giants ===
In February 2026, Newsome was hired as an assistant offensive line coach by new head coach John Harbaugh of the New York Giants, Jim Harbaugh’s brother.
