= Joe Bolden =

American football player and coach (born 1993)

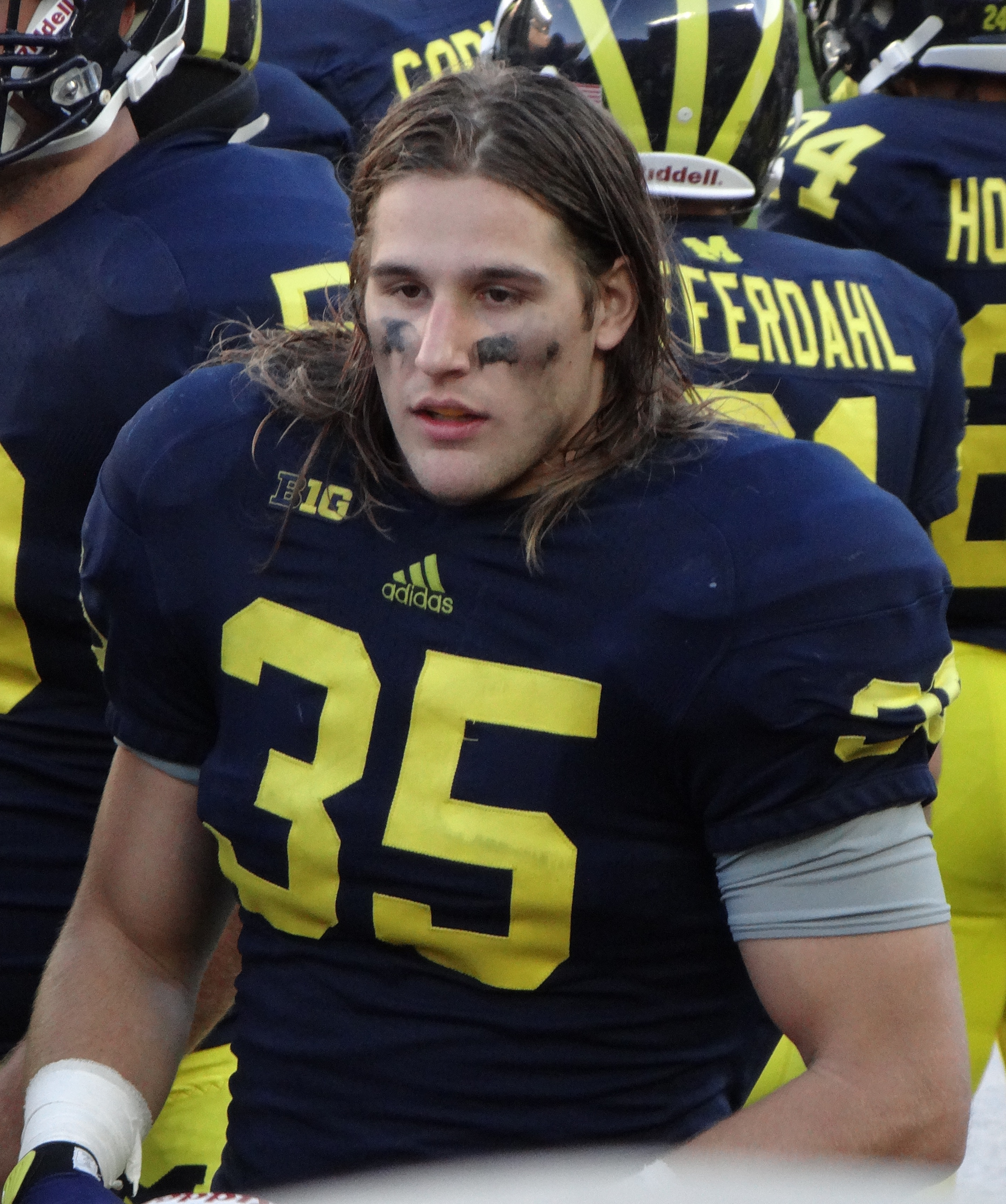
- Bolden in 2012

Current position
- Title: Defensive coordinator
- Team: Southern Miss
- Conference: Sun Belt

Biographical details
- Born: August 19, 1993 (age 33); Cincinnati, Ohio, U.S.
- Education: University of Michigan

Playing career
- 2012–2015: Michigan
- Position: Linebacker

Coaching career (HC unless noted)
- 2016: Michigan (GA)
- 2017–2018: Washington State (GA)
- 2019: USC (STQC)
- 2020–2021: Ohio State (DQC)
- 2022: Nevada (ST/OLB)
- 2023: Tulsa (ST)
- 2024: Tulsa (ST/co-DRGC)
- 2025: Southern Miss (ST)
- 2026-present: Southern Miss (DC/LB)

Joseph Daniel Bolden (born August 19, 1993) is an American football coach and former player. He is currently the defensive coordinator for Southern Miss. Bolden is a former player for the Michigan Wolverines football team.

== High school career ==
Bolden was born in 1993 and raised in Cincinnati, Ohio, attending Colerain High School. He verbally committed to the University of Michigan in April 2011. He was selected as a first-team All-Ohio player in 2011 and played in the 2012 Under Armour All-America Game.

== College career ==
As a freshman during the 2012 season, Bolden appeared in 13 games on special teams and 12 games as a backup at the linebacker position. At the end of the season, he was named to the All-Big Ten Conference freshman teams selected by ESPN.com and BTN.com. As a sophomore in 2013, Bolden appeared in 13 games as a linebacker and was a starter in four games.

During the 2014 season, Bolden was Michigan's second leading tackler with 102 tackles, including 55 solo tackles.

In April 2015, Bolden was placed on the watch list for the Lott IMPACT Trophy. He was selected as a co-captain of the 2015 Michigan team. During the 2015 season, Bolden led Michigan with 83 total tackles.

== NFL career ==
Bolden went undrafted in the 2016 NFL draft. Bolden subsequently tried out with the Washington Redskins during rookie mini-camp.

== Coaching career ==
=== Early coaching ===
Following his playing career, Bolden was a graduate assistant for one year at Michigan in 2016 before a brief stop at Florida Atlantic and then on to Washington State for the 2017 and 2018 seasons. In 2019, he served as the special teams quality control analyst at USC.

In 2020, Bolden joined Ohio State coaching staff as a quality control coach on defense.

=== Nevada ===
In January 2022, Bolden got his first full-time coaching position when he was hired as part of Ken Wilson's inaugural Nevada Wolf Pack staff. He will serve as the special teams coordinator, while also coaching the outside linebackers.

=== Southern Miss ===
In January 2025, it was announced that Bolden would take up the position of special teams coordinator for Southern Miss.

In December 2025, it was announced that Bolden would be promoted to the position of defensive coordinator and linebackers coach for Southern Miss for the 2026 season.
