= Tim Drevno =

American football player and coach (born 1969)

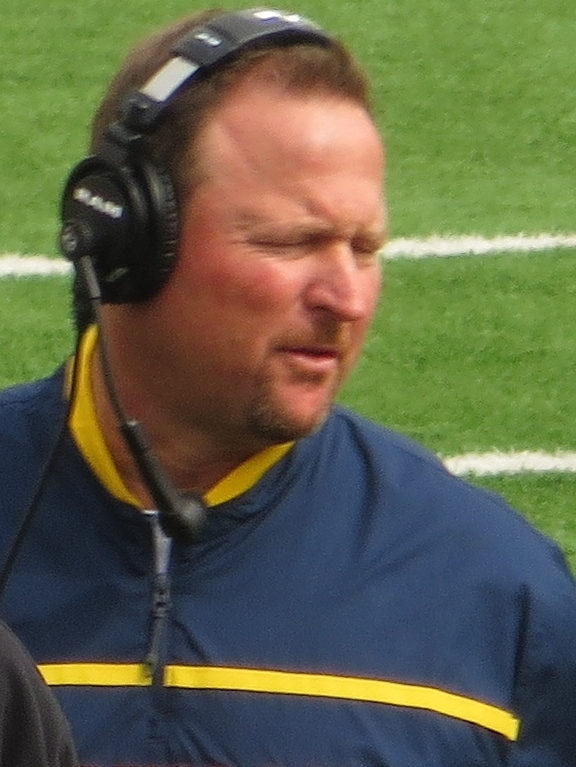
- Drevno as Michigan offensive coordinator in 2015

Current position
- Title: Offensive line coach
- Team: Northwestern
- Conference: Big Ten

Biographical details
- Born: March 20, 1969 (age 57); Torrance, California, U.S.

Playing career
- 1987–1988: El Camino
- 1989–1990: Cal State Fullerton
- Position: Offensive lineman

Coaching career (HC unless noted)
- 1991–1992: Cal State Fullerton (GA)
- 1993–1995: Montana State (TE)
- 1996–1997: Montana State (RB)
- 1998: UNLV (RB)
- 1999: San Jose State (OL)
- 2000–2002: Idaho (OL)
- 2003–2006: San Diego (OC/OL)
- 2007–2008: Stanford (TE)
- 2009–2010: Stanford (OL)
- 2011–2013: San Francisco 49ers (OL)
- 2014: USC (RGC/OL)
- 2015–2017: Michigan (OC/OL)
- 2018–2020: USC (RGC/OL)
- 2021: UCLA (OA)
- 2022–2023: UCLA (OL)
- 2024: Ohio State (QC)
- 2025: Texas (Consultant)
- 2026–present: Northwestern (OL)

Accomplishments and honors

Championships
- CFP national champion (2024)

Timothy David Drevno (born March 20, 1969) is an American football player and coach, who is currently serving as an offensive consultant at Northwestern University. Prior to this role, Drevno served as the offensive line coach at UCLA and USC. From 2015 to 2017 he served as the offensive coordinator and offensive line coach at the University of Michigan. From 2011 to 2013, he was the offensive line coach of the San Francisco 49ers of the National Football League (NFL). Prior to his tenure with the 49ers, Drevno worked as a football coach at several other National Collegiate Athletic Association (NCAA) institutions, including Stanford University, where he was the offensive line coach from 2007 to 2010. Drevno played college football as an offensive lineman at California State University, Fullerton.

== Playing career ==
Drevno was a standout offensive lineman at South High School in Torrance, California, earning all-league honors. He went on to play college football at El Camino College. At El Camino, Drevno won a national championship in 1987, and earned All-Mission League honors in 1988. He then transferred to Cal-State Fullerton, where he started on the offensive line in 1989 and 1990.

== Coaching career ==
Drevno began his football coaching career in 1993 at Montana State University. At Montana State he coached tight ends from 1993 to 1995, and running backs from 1996 to 1997. He transitioned to UNLV in 1998, where he coached running backs. In 1999, Drevno began coaching the offensive line at San Jose State University.

He began to specialize as an offensive line coach at the University of Idaho from 2000 to 2002, where he coaches three future NFL offensive linemen: Rick Demulling, Jake Scott and Patrick Venzke. Idaho was very successful on offense during Drevno's tenure, ranking 6th nationally in total yards in 2001 and 8th in the nation in 2000.

Drevno worked as the offensive coordinator and offensive line coach at the University of San Diego (USD) from 2003 to 2006. During his tenure, USD won Pioneer Football League championships and NCAA Division I-AA Mid-Major national titles in both 2005 and 2006. In 2005, USD set school records for points per game and total offense; and, in 2006, USD led the nation in passing offense, total offense, and scoring offense. He coached at Stanford University from 2007 to 2010, as the tight ends coach from 2007 to 2008 and the offensive line coach from 2009 to 2010. During his tenure, Drevno helped a rebuilding effort that culminated in a 12–1 record and Orange Bowl championship in 2010. He also mentored first-team all-American center Chase Beeler in 2010.

On January 11, 2011, Drevno joined the coaching staff of the San Francisco 49ers as offensive line coach, working alongside Mike Solari. During his tenure, the 49ers offensive line helped Frank Gore to become the leading rusher in franchise history, advanced to Super Bowl XLVII, and have had three offensive linemen named to the NFL Pro Bowl.

== Personal life ==
Drevno is married to his wife Shannon, and the couple have three children: McKenna, Zachary, and Baylee. He is a 1992 graduate of Cal State Fullerton and holds a degree in Criminal Justice.
