= Kenny Allen (American football) =

American football player (born 1994)

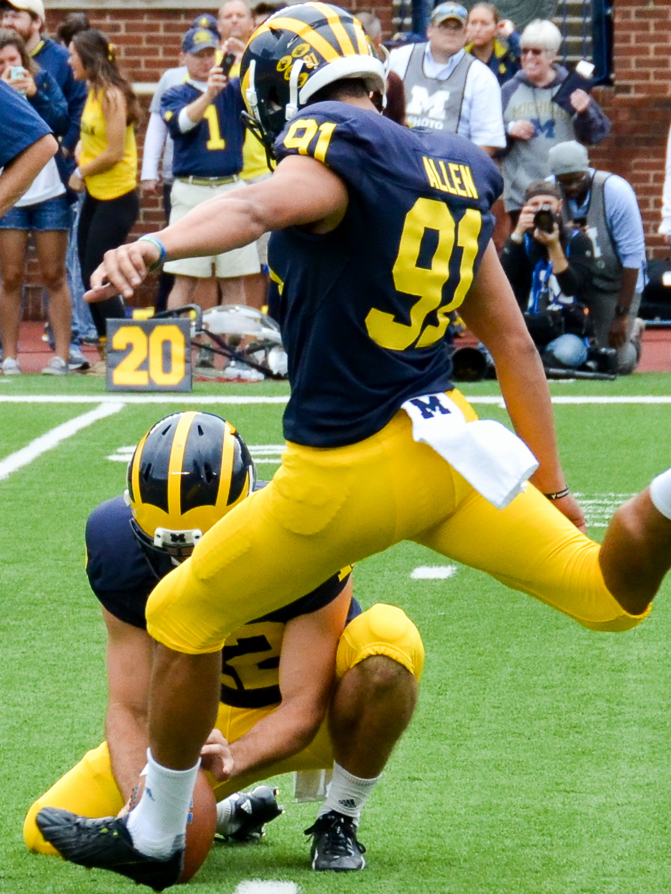
- Allen in 2015

No. 91
- Position: Punter / Placekicker

Personal information
- Born: July 8, 1994 (age 32); Fenton, Michigan, U.S.
- Listed height: 6 ft 4 in (1.93 m)
- Listed weight: 222 lb (101 kg)

Career information
- High school: Fenton
- College: Michigan
- NFL draft: 2017: undrafted

Career history
- Baltimore Ravens (2017)*; Hamilton Tiger-Cats (2017)
- * Offseason or practice squad member only

Awards and highlights
- Third-team All-Big Ten (2015); Second-team All-Big Ten (2016)
- Stats at CFL.ca

Kenneth Arthur Allen (born July 8, 1994) is an American former professional football player who was a punter and placekicker for the Hamilton Tiger-Cats of the Canadian Football League (CFL). He played college football for the Michigan Wolverines as their starting placekicker and punter in 2015 and 2016.

== Early life ==
Allen was born in 1994 and played college soccer at Oakland University in Rochester, MI. He attended Fenton High School in Fenton, Michigan. As a high school kicker, he was ranked as the No. 2 punter and No. 13 placekicker in the country by Rivals.com.

== University of Michigan ==
Despite receiving scholarship offers from multiple schools, Allen chose to enroll at the University of Michigan in 2012 as a preferred walk-on. His mother did her Undergraduate and Graduate degrees at University of Michigan. Due to his hard work and support from his sister, He was given a scholarship in 2015.

During the 2015 season, Allen became Michigan's starting placekicker while Blake O'Neill handled punting duties. In the opening game against Utah, Allen kicked a field goal for the first points of the Jim Harbaugh era. His kickoff against Utah, where his sister Hannah now lives, was also the first field goal made by an African-American kicker in Big Ten history. Allen converted eight of ten field goal attempts and 25 of 25 points after touchdown (PAT) attempts. He also secured touchbacks on 22 of 46 kickoffs.

During the 2016 season, Allen was Michigan's starter as a punter and a placekicker, handling kickoffs and field goals. On September 10, 2016, he scored a career-high 14 points in a game on three field goals and five PATs. Allen was named the Big Ten Special Teams Player of the Week for the week ending October 31, 2016. Allen made field goals from 23, 23 and 45-yards on October 29, setting a new season-long, and also hit all three PAT tries to total 12 of Michigan's 32 points in its nine-point win over Michigan State for the Paul Bunyan Trophy. Allen also kicked off six times with three touchbacks and a 64.2-yard average and punted three times for 122 yards, landing one inside the 20-yard line. During the 2016 season, Allen was second in the league with a 42.6-yard average, punting 46 times for 1,961 yards with 20 punts inside the opposition's 20-yard line and 14 punts of 50 yards or better. He has converted his last 12 field goal attempts, the third-longest streak in school history, and has converted 16-of-20 field goals this season. Following the 2016 season, Allen was named to the All-Big Ten special teams second-team, by both the coaches and media.

== Professional career ==
Allen signed with the Baltimore Ravens as an undrafted free agent on May 5, 2017. He was waived on September 1, 2017, during final roster cutdowns.

Allen signed with the Hamilton Tiger-Cats on October 9, 2017.
