= Erik Magnuson =

American football player (born 1994)

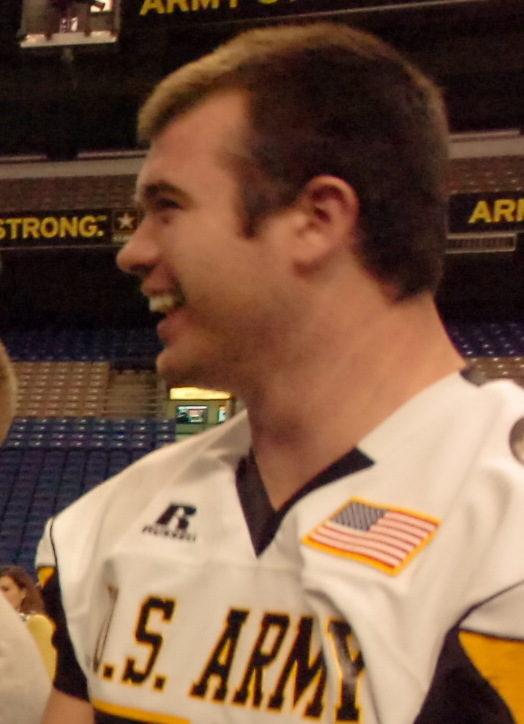
- Magnuson in 2012

Profile
- Position: Center, Guard, Tackle

Personal information
- Born: January 5, 1994 (age 32); Encinitas, California, U.S.
- Listed height: 6 ft 5 in (1.96 m)
- Listed weight: 310 lb (141 kg)

Career information
- High school: La Costa Canyon(Carlsbad, California)
- College: Michigan (2012–2016)
- NFL draft: 2017: undrafted

Career history
- San Francisco 49ers (2017–2018); Buffalo Bills (2019)*; Oakland / Las Vegas Raiders (2019–2020)(2021)*
- * Offseason or practice squad member only

Awards and highlights
- First-team All-Big Ten (2016); Third-team All-Big Ten (2015)

Career NFL statistics
- Games played: 10
- Games started: 3
- Stats at Pro Football Reference

Erik Magnuson (born January 5, 1994) is an American former professional football player who was an offensive lineman in the National Football League (NFL). He played college football for the Michigan Wolverines.

== College career ==
Magnuson played in 46 games for Michigan. In 2016, he started all 12 games at right tackle, earning All-Big Ten first-team award.

== Professional career ==
=== San Francisco 49ers ===
After going undrafted in the 2017 NFL draft, Magnuson signed with the San Francisco 49ers as an undrafted free agent on May 4, 2017. He played in four games, starting two at both tackle spots, before being placed on injured reserve on November 29, 2017.

On July 25, 2019, Magnuson was waived/injured by the 49ers and placed on injured reserve. He was released on August 2, 2019.

=== Buffalo Bills ===
On August 20, 2019, Magnuson signed with the Buffalo Bills. He was released during final roster cuts on August 31, 2019 and was signed to the practice squad the next day.

=== Oakland / Las Vegas Raiders ===
On October 30, 2019, Magnuson was signed by the Oakland Raiders off the Bills practice squad. He was waived on November 27, 2019 and re-signed to the practice squad. On December 30, 2019, Magnuson was signed to a reserve/future contract. He was waived on August 3, 2020. He was signed to the practice squad on September 6, 2020. Magnuson was fined US$15,000 by the NFL on October 5, 2020, for attending a charity event hosted by teammate Darren Waller during the COVID-19 pandemic in violation of the NFL's COVID-19 protocols for the 2020 season; these fines were later dropped. He was elevated to the active roster on January 2, 2021, for the team's week 17 game against the Denver Broncos, and reverted to the practice squad after the game. He signed a reserve/future contract on January 5, 2021. He retired from the Las Vegas Raiders on June 3, 2021.
