= Jarrod Wilson =

American football player (born 1994)

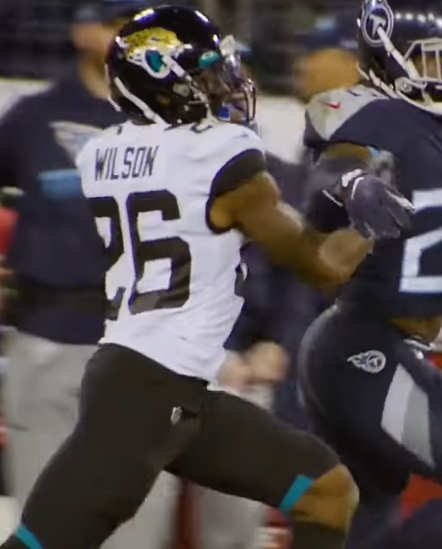
- Wilson with the Jacksonville Jaguars in 2019

No. 47, 26, 39, 30
- Position: Safety

Personal information
- Born: February 9, 1994 (age 32); Akron, Ohio, U.S.
- Listed height: 6 ft 1 in (1.85 m)
- Listed weight: 209 lb (95 kg)

Career information
- High school: Buchtel (Akron)
- College: Michigan
- NFL draft: 2016: undrafted

Career history
- Jacksonville Jaguars (2016–2020); New York Jets (2021); San Francisco 49ers (2021); New York Giants (2022)*
- * Offseason or practice squad member only

Career NFL statistics
- Total tackles: 204
- Sacks: 1.0
- Pass deflections: 9
- Interceptions: 3
- Forced fumbles: 2
- Fumble recoveries: 1
- Stats at Pro Football Reference

Jarrod Wilson (born February 9, 1994) is an American former professional football player who was a safety in the National Football League (NFL). He was signed as an undrafted free agent by the Jacksonville Jaguars after the 2016 NFL draft. He played college football for the Michigan Wolverines.

== Professional career ==
=== Jacksonville Jaguars ===
On April 30, 2016, the Jacksonville Jaguars signed Wilson to a three-year, $1.62 million contract that includes a signing bonus of $5,000 as an undrafted free agent. Throughout training camp, Wilson competed for a roster spot as a backup safety against James Sample and Josh Evans.

He made the team's 53-man roster on September 3, 2016. He played in all 16 games recording eight tackles.

In 2018, Wilson played in all 16 games primarily on special teams and as a backup safety. He made his first career start at strong safety in Week 16 against the Miami Dolphins. He finished the season with 21 tackles, two passes defensed, and a forced fumble.

On January 19, 2019, Wilson signed a three-year contract extension with the Jaguars through the 2021 season.

On September 14, 2020, Wilson was placed on injured reserve with a hamstring injury. He was activated on October 10, 2020.

On August 31, 2021, Wilson was released by the Jaguars.

=== New York Jets ===
On September 6, 2021, Wilson was signed to the practice squad of the New York Jets. He was promoted to the active roster on September 14. Wilson was released on October 7, and was re-signed to the practice squad that same day. He was promoted to the active roster on October 26, but was released four days later. Wilson was re-signed to the active roster on November 2. On December 7, 2021, Wilson was released.

=== San Francisco 49ers ===
On December 9, 2021, Wilson was signed to the San Francisco 49ers practice squad. He was promoted to the active roster on December 23. He was waived on January 25, 2022, and re-signed to the practice squad.

=== New York Giants ===
On August 1, 2022, the New York Giants signed Wilson. On August 14, 2022, Wilson was waived.
