= Willie Henry =

American football player (born 1994)

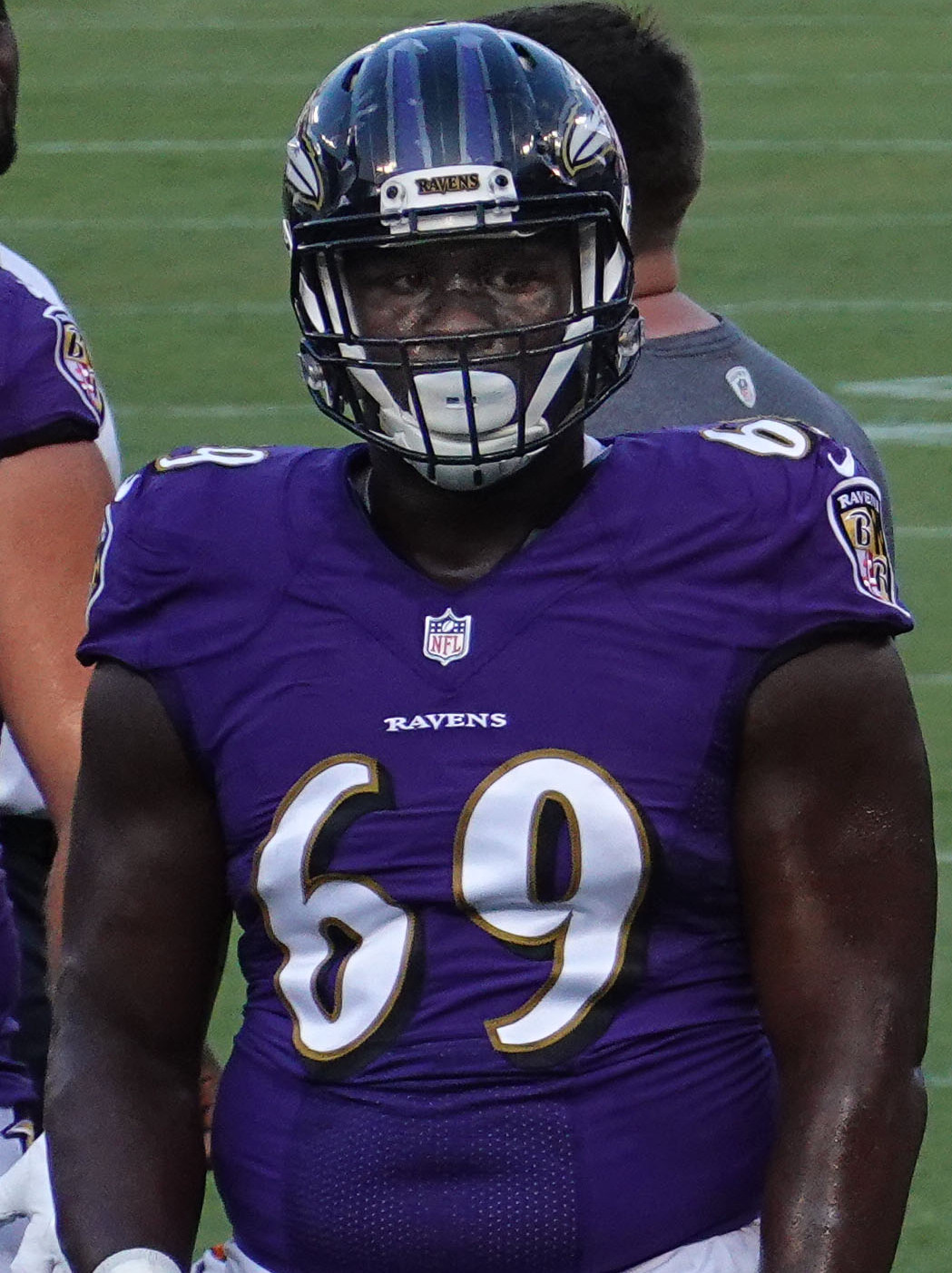
- Henry with the Baltimore Ravens in 2018

No. 69
- Position: Defensive tackle

Personal information
- Born: March 20, 1994 (age 32); Cleveland, Ohio, U.S.
- Listed height: 6 ft 3 in (1.91 m)
- Listed weight: 288 lb (131 kg)

Career information
- High school: Glenville (Cleveland)
- College: Michigan
- NFL draft: 2016: 4th round, 132nd overall pick

Career history
- Baltimore Ravens (2016–2018); San Francisco 49ers (2020); Houston Texans (2020)*; Philadelphia Eagles (2021)*; New York Giants (2021)*; Birmingham Stallions (2022–2023); Memphis Showboats (2024)*
- * Offseason or practice squad member only

Awards and highlights
- 2× USFL champion (2022, 2023)

Career NFL statistics
- Total tackles: 36
- Sacks: 4.5
- Fumble recoveries: 1
- Stats at Pro Football Reference

Willie Henry (born March 20, 1994) is an American former professional football player who was a defensive tackle in the National Football League (NFL). He played college football for the Michigan Wolverines.

== Early life ==
Henry was born on March 20, 1997 in Cleveland, Ohio where he later attended Glenville High School. As a 6 ft 3 in (1.91 m), 230 pounds (104 kg) dual-sport athlete, Henry played as a forward in basketball and as a lineman both offensively and defensively with the Tarblooders football team. In football, Henry played under Coach Ted Ginn Sr. Unanimously rated a three-star recruiting prospect by Rivals.com, 247Sports and ESPN.com, Henry received 12 collegiate sports offers from Michigan, Illinois, Pittsburgh, Eastern Michigan, Hawaii, Akron, Ball State, Bowling Green, Cincinnati, Ohio, Syracuse and Toledo.

== College career ==
After graduating in 2012, Henry accepted the offer made by Michigan. Gaining 81 pounds (37 kg), Henry's maturity as a 311 pounds (141 kg) defensive lineman resulted in a total of 32 tackles. This performance earned Henry ESPN's All-Big Ten Freshman Team honors in the 2013 season. His junior season in 2015 earned him Big Ten honorable mention for his career high of 34 tackles, 10 tackles for loss and 6.5 sacks. At the end of his junior season, Henry started in 21 of his 33 total games played, making 40 solo tackles out of a total of 86 career tackles, 18.5 TFLs, 10 sacks and 1 touchdown interception. After his junior season, Henry opted to enter the 2016 NFL draft.

== Professional career ==
=== Baltimore Ravens ===
Henry was selected by the Baltimore Ravens in the fourth round, 132nd overall, in the 2016 NFL draft. He was placed on injured reserve on November 15, 2016, ending his rookie season without playing a single snap through nine games, being inactive for all but one.

On September 24, 2017, Henry played his first regular season game for the Ravens. He ended the 2017 season with 3.5 sacks and two fumble recoveries in 13 games.

After missing the first four games of the 2018 season due to hernia surgery, Henry played in three games before being placed on injured reserve on October 23, 2018.

On August 30, 2019, Henry was released by the Ravens.

=== San Francisco 49ers ===
On January 22, 2020, Henry signed a reserve/future contract with the San Francisco 49ers. He was waived with a non-football illness designation on July 28, 2020. He was re-signed to their practice squad on October 27, 2020. He was elevated to the active roster on November 28 for the team's week 12 game against the Los Angeles Rams, and reverted to the practice squad after the game. He was released on December 15, 2020.

=== Houston Texans ===
On December 22, 2020, Henry signed with the practice squad of the Houston Texans. His practice squad contract with the team expired after the season on January 11, 2021.

=== Philadelphia Eagles ===
On May 25, 2021, Henry signed with the Philadelphia Eagles. On July 25, 2021, Eagles released Henry.

=== New York Giants ===
On August 12, 2021, Henry signed with the New York Giants. He was waived on August 31, 2021, and re-signed to the practice squad the next day. On September 28, 2021, Henry was released from the practice squad.

=== Birmingham Stallions ===
Henry signed with the Birmingham Stallions of the United States Football League on April 28, 2022.

=== Memphis Showboats ===
On January 15, 2024, Henry was selected by the Memphis Showboats in the 14th round of the Super Draft portion of the 2024 UFL dispersal draft. He was waived on February 12, 2024.
