= Jehu Chesson =

Liberian gridiron football player (born 1993)

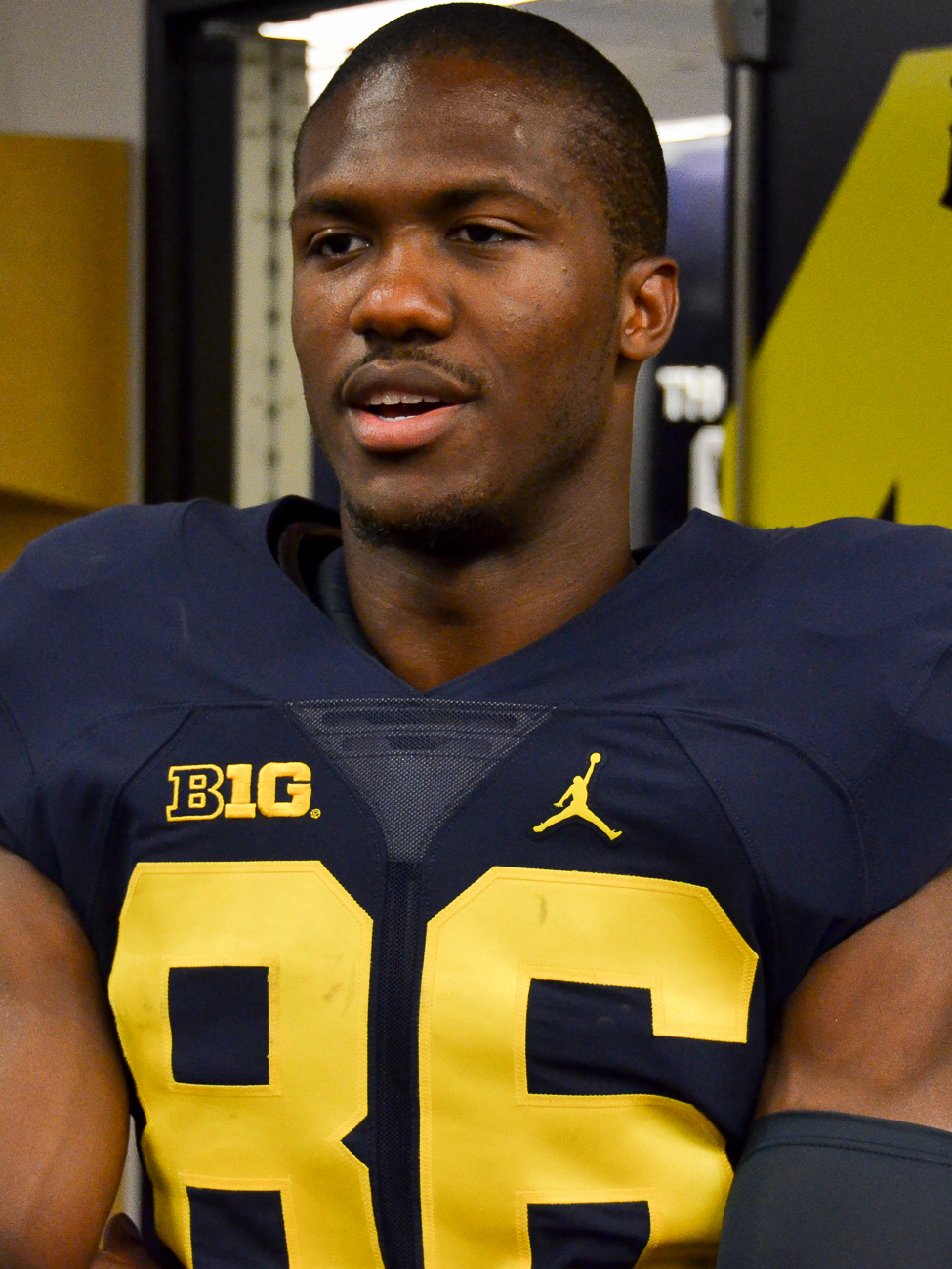
- Chesson with the Michigan Wolverines in 2016

No. 80, 16
- Position: Wide receiver

Personal information
- Born: 29 December 1993 (age 32); Monrovia, Liberia
- Listed height: 6 ft 2 in (1.88 m)
- Listed weight: 204 lb (93 kg)

Career information
- High school: Ladue Horton Watkins (Ladue, Missouri, U.S.)
- College: Michigan
- NFL draft: 2017: 4th round, 139th overall pick

Career history
- Kansas City Chiefs (2017); Washington Redskins (2018–2019); New York Jets (2020)*
- * Offseason or practice squad member only

Awards and highlights
- First-team All-Big Ten (2015)

Career NFL statistics
- Receptions: 3
- Receiving yards: 25
- Return yards: 65
- Stats at Pro Football Reference

Jehu Femi Chesson II (born 29 December 1993) is a Liberian former professional football wide receiver. He played college football at Michigan, and was selected by the Kansas City Chiefs in the fourth round of the 2017 NFL draft. He owns the school record for most receiving touchdowns in a game, tied with Derrick Alexander with four. His 207 receiving yards against Indiana during the 2015 season also ranks as the third-highest total in school history.

== Early life ==
Chesson was born in Monrovia, Liberia, on 29 December 1993, and grew up during the First Liberian Civil War. His father, Jehu Chesson Sr., worked in the financial industry but joined Lutheran World Service as a relief worker during the war. Chesson moved with his family to neighboring Côte d'Ivoire at the age of two and then to St. Louis, Missouri, three years later, where his father took a job working for MasterCard.

Chesson grew up in St. Louis and began playing American football in the eighth grade. He attended Ladue Horton Watkins High School where he played at the wide receiver position. He caught 53 passes for 757 yards as a senior, and he was selected as a first-team All-Missouri player. He was also the Missouri high school champion in the 300-meter hurdles in 2011.

== College career ==
A 3-star wide receiver recruit, Chesson accepted a scholarship to play football at the University of Michigan over offers from Iowa, Missouri, Northwestern, Oklahoma State, and Purdue, among others. As a freshman in 2012, he redshirted and did not see game action. As a sophomore in 2013, he had a 33-yard touchdown on his first collegiate reception and caught 15 passes for 221 yards. As a junior in 2014, he caught 14 passes for 154 yards.

Chesson also saw action on kickoff returns, and in a 10 October 2015 game, against Northwestern, he returned the opening kickoff 96 yards for a touchdown. Chesson's return against Northwestern was the first kickoff returned for a touchdown by a Michigan player since Darryl Stonum accomplished the feat in 2009 against Notre Dame.

On 14 November 2015, Chesson had a breakout game, catching 10 passes for 207 yards and four touchdowns against Indiana. Three of the four touchdowns were scored in the first half, and the fourth came on a fourth-down play with two seconds remaining in regulation and Michigan trailing 34 to 27. Chesson's 207 receiving yards ranks as the third highest single-game total in Michigan football history. He also tied Derrick Alexander's Michigan single-game record of four receiving touchdowns set in 1992. He was subsequently named the Co-Big Ten Conference Offensive Player of the Week, along with Jake Rudock. Chesson and Rudock became the second-ever pair of teammates in conference history to share the Big Ten Offensive Player of the Week Award.

During the 2015 season, Chesson led Michigan with 1,085 all-purpose yards and 12 touchdowns. He established new career highs with 50 receptions and 764 receiving yards and nine receiving touchdowns. He also had 166 return yards and one touchdown on four kick returns and 155 rushing yards and two touchdowns on eight carries (19.4 yards per carry). Following the 2015 season, Chesson was named to the All-Big Ten offensive first-team, and was awarded the Bo Schembechler Most Valuable Player Award, by his teammates.

As a fifth-year senior in 2016, Chesson was voted Honorable Mention All-Big Ten, playing in 13 games with 7 starts at wide receiver, recording 35 catches for 500 yards and two touchdowns, along with 12 carries for 63 yards and a touchdown.

== Professional career ==
Pre-draft measurables
Height	Weight	Arm length	Hand span	40-yard dash	10-yard split	20-yard split	20-yard shuttle	Three-cone drill	Vertical jump	Broad jump	Bench press
6 ft 2 7/8 in (1.90 m)	204 lb (93 kg)	33 1/4 in (0.84 m)	9 1/8 in (0.23 m)	4.46 s	1.65 s	2.60 s	4.09 s	6.70 s	39.5 in (1.00 m)	11 ft 0 in (3.35 m)	13 reps
All values from NFL Combine/Pro Day

=== Kansas City Chiefs ===
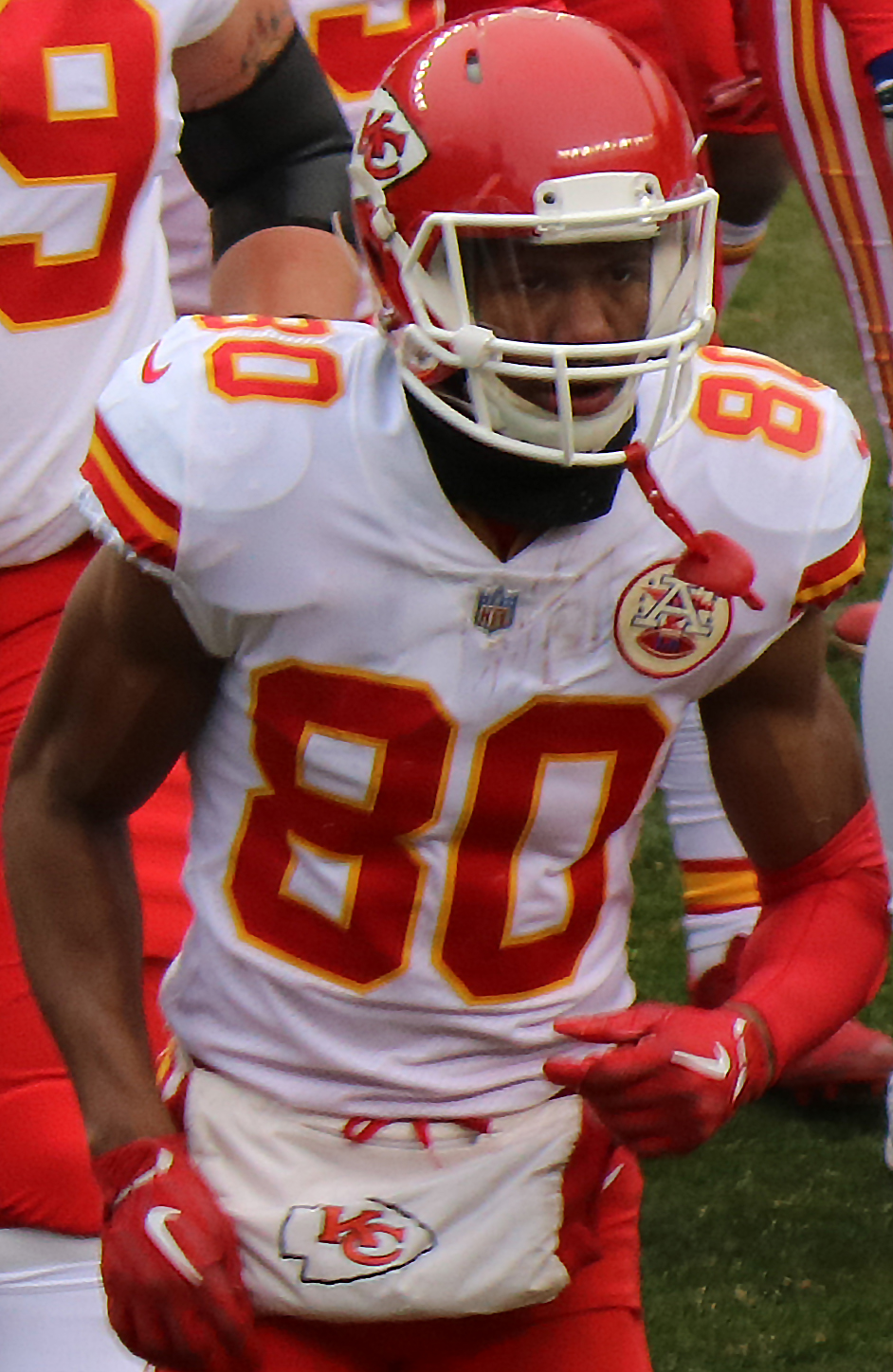
Chesson with the Chiefs in 2017

Chesson was drafted by the Kansas City Chiefs in the fourth round, 139th overall, in the 2017 NFL draft. In Week 9, against the Dallas Cowboys, he recorded a 10-yard reception for the first catch of his NFL career. He finished his rookie season with two receptions for 18 yards and no touchdowns. He was waived on 1 September 2018.

=== Washington Redskins ===
Chesson was signed to the practice squad of the Washington Redskins on 5 September 2018. He was promoted to the active roster on 12 September 2018, but was waived on 17 September and returned to the practice squad the following day. He was promoted to the active roster again on 18 October after injuries to Jamison Crowder and Paul Richardson.

Chesson was waived on 31 August 2019, but was signed to the practice squad the following day. His practice squad contract with the team expired on 6 January 2020.

=== New York Jets ===
Chesson signed a futures contract with the New York Jets on 9 January 2020. He was waived on 5 September 2020.

== See also ==
- Michigan Wolverines football statistical leaders
