= Jake Rudock =

American football player (born 1993)

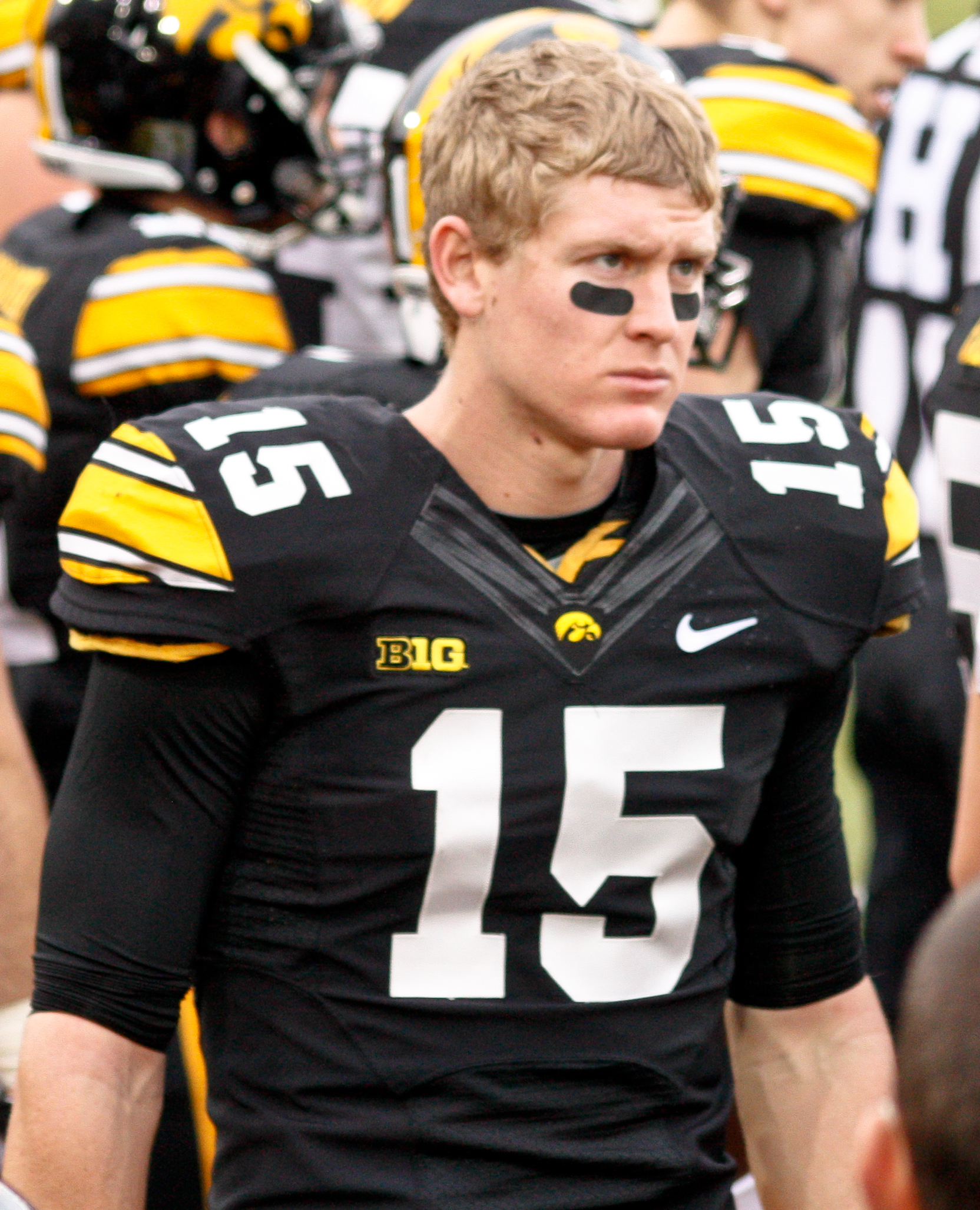
- Rudock with the Iowa Hawkeyes in 2014

No. 14, 5
- Position: Quarterback

Personal information
- Born: January 21, 1993 (age 33); Miami, Florida, U.S.
- Listed height: 6 ft 3 in (1.91 m)
- Listed weight: 212 lb (96 kg)

Career information
- High school: St. Thomas Aquinas (Fort Lauderdale, Florida)
- College: Iowa (2011–2014); Michigan (2015)
- NFL draft: 2016: 6th round, 191st overall pick

Career history
- Detroit Lions (2016–2018); Miami Dolphins (2019–2020)

Awards and highlights
- Citrus Bowl MVP (2016)

Career NFL statistics
- Passing completions: 3
- Passing attempts: 5
- Completion percentage: 60.0
- TD-INT: 0–1
- Passing yards: 24
- Passer rating: 32.5
- Stats at Pro Football Reference

Jacob Michael Rudock (/ˈruːdɒk/ ROO-dok; born January 21, 1993) is an American former professional football player who was a quarterback for five seasons in the National Football League (NFL). He was a starting quarterback playing college football for the 2013 and 2014 Iowa Hawkeyes and 2015 Michigan Wolverines. He was selected by the Detroit Lions in the sixth round of the 2016 NFL draft.

== Early life ==
Rudock grew up in Weston, Florida and went to St. Thomas Aquinas High School in Fort Lauderdale, Florida, where he was the Broward County Player of the Year. In 2009, St. Thomas Aquinas went 13–1 while making it to the state semifinals. He completed 128-of-197 passes for 1,945 yards. Rudock connected with his players in the end zone for a total of thirty-four touchdowns while only turning the ball over five times. As a senior at St. Thomas Aquinas he led the team to district, regional, state and national championships with a perfect regular season. He holds records for total yards, most wins as a starting quarterback, completions, attempts, completion percentage, efficiency ratings, state titles, and national championships. He graduated in 2011.

== College career ==
=== University of Iowa ===
Rudock committed to the University of Iowa during his senior year of high school. He also received collegiate offers from Colorado, Illinois, Memphis, Minnesota, and Wisconsin. He redshirted his freshman year at Iowa and did not play at all the following year. During his junior year, he started all thirteen games while getting his first start against Northern Illinois. He played every offensive down for Iowa but ended up losing to Northern Illinois 30–27.

His most prominent game during his junior year was his start against LSU in the Outback Bowl in which they lost 21–14, a game in which he completed 9-of-22 pass attempts for 102 yards with one interception. During the 2013 season, he started all thirteen games for Iowa. For the season, he completed 204-of-346 pass attempts for a total of eighteen touchdowns, thirteen interceptions, and 2,383 yards. He also rushed for 218 yards on sixty-seven attempts.

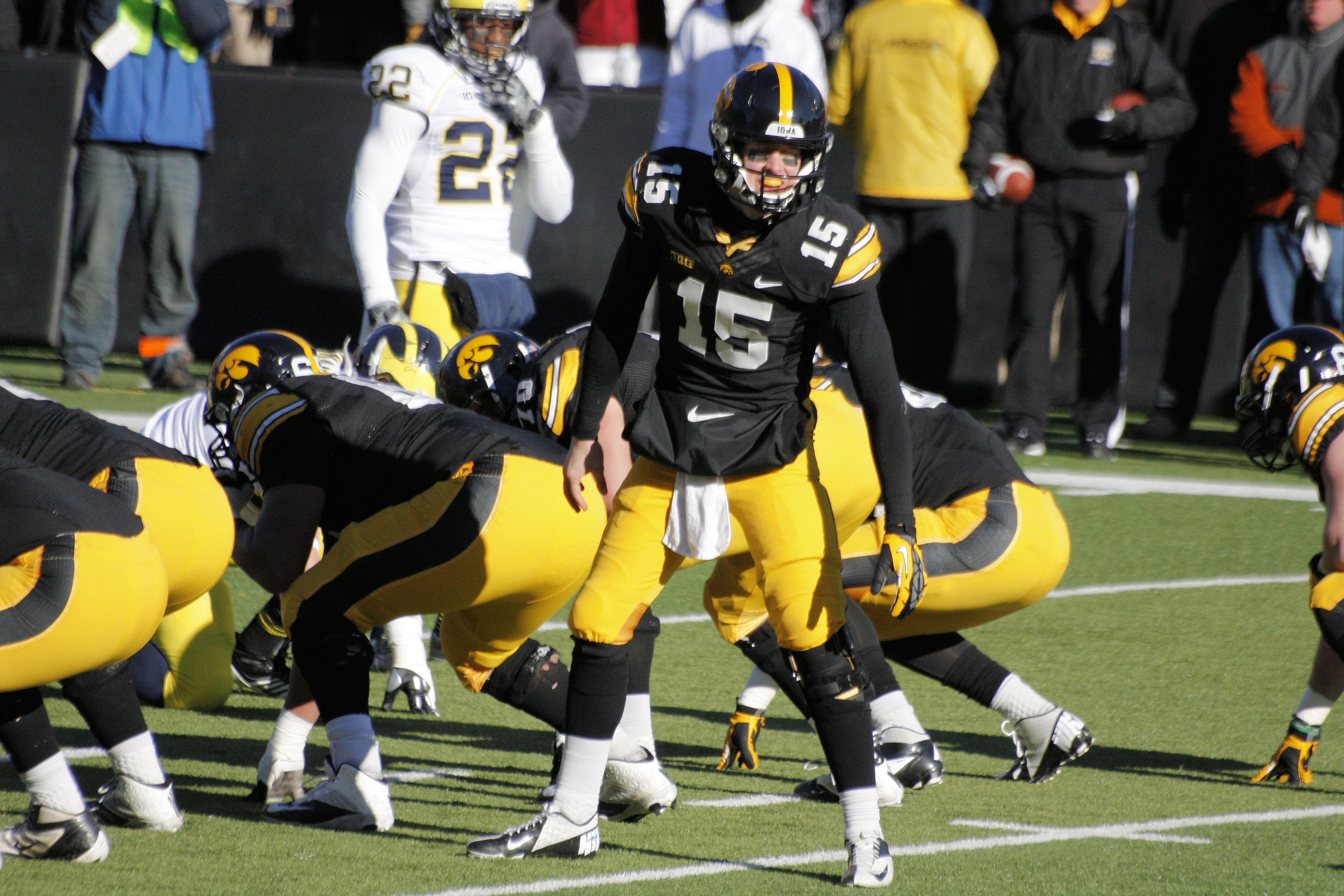
Rudock with Iowa

His following year he started all but one game for Iowa. During this year he started in the TaxSlayer Bowl loss to Tennessee in which he went 2-of-8 for thirty-two yards while rushing for twenty-two yards on two rushing attempts. He completed 213-of-345 attempts for 2,436 yards and rushed sixty-seven times for a total of 176 yards.

=== University of Michigan ===
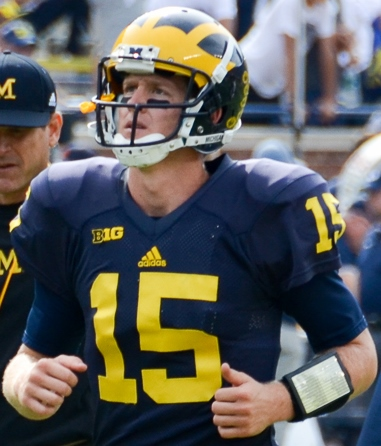
Rudock at Michigan in 2015

On April 1, 2015, the Big Ten Conference approved the transfer for Rudock to enroll at the University of Michigan. He was immediately eligible for the 2015 football season. On November 14, Rudock set the Michigan record for single-game touchdown passes against Indiana, earning co-Big Ten Player of the Week with his receiver Jehu Chesson. The following week against Penn State, he became the first quarterback in school history to pass for 250 yards in three consecutive games.

Rudock was named the MVP of the 2016 Citrus Bowl. Rudock became the first quarterback in Michigan history to throw for at least 250 yards in five consecutive games. Rudock completed 20-of-31 passes for 278 yards and three touchdowns, becoming just the second Michigan quarterback to throw for 3,000 yards in a single season, following John Navarre in 2003. Rudock finished his season ranked No. 2 in single-season passing yards and No. 1 in single-season completion percentage.

=== Statistics ===
Season	Passing							Rushing			
Season	Cmp	Att	Yds	Pct	TD	Int	Rtg	Att	Yds	Avg	TD
Iowa Hawkeyes
2011	Redshirted										
2012	Did not play										
2013	204	346	2,383	59.0	18	13	126.5	67	218	3.3	5
2014	213	345	2,436	61.7	16	5	133.5	67	176	2.6	3
Michigan Wolverines
2015	249	389	3,017	64.0	20	9	141.5	58	166	2.9	4
Career	666	1,080	7,836	61.7	54	27	134.1	192	560	2.9	12

== Professional career ==
Pre-draft measurables
Height	Weight	Arm length	Hand span	40-yard dash	10-yard split	20-yard split	20-yard shuttle	Three-cone drill	Vertical jump	Broad jump
6 ft 3 in (1.91 m)	207 lb (94 kg)	31 3/8 in (0.80 m)	9 5/8 in (0.24 m)	4.88 s	1.75 s	2.84 s	4.22 s	7.09 s	29.0 in (0.74 m)	9 ft 3 in (2.82 m)
All values from Michigan's Pro Day

=== Detroit Lions ===
The Detroit Lions selected Rudock in the sixth round of the 2016 NFL draft. On September 3, 2016, he was waived by the Lions and was signed to their practice squad the next day. He was promoted to the Lions active roster on November 23, 2016. He spent his rookie season as the third-string quarterback behind Matthew Stafford and Dan Orlovsky, and didn't make any game appearances. After the Lions did not re-sign Orlovsky after the 2016 season, Rudock was expected to be the backup to Stafford in 2017. The Lions drafted Miami quarterback Brad Kaaya in the 2017 NFL draft to compete with Rudock during training camp and preseason in 2017. Rudock ultimately won the backup job after Kaaya was waived at the end of the preseason. Rudock attempted his first NFL pass in Week 13 against the Baltimore Ravens. He went 3-for-5 for 24 yards with one interception.

On March 14, 2018, the Lions re-signed Rudock to a one-year contract extension. He was waived on September 1, 2018, and was signed to the practice squad the next day.

=== Miami Dolphins ===
On January 11, 2019, Rudock signed a reserve/future contract with the Miami Dolphins. On August 31, 2019, Rudock was released during final roster cuts and re-signed to the practice squad. He signed a reserve/future contract with the Dolphins on January 6, 2020, after his practice squad contract expired. The Dolphins waived Rudock on July 25, 2020. He was re-signed to their practice squad on September 7, 2020, and was released on September 14. He was re-signed to the practice squad again on October 3, and released again two days later. On December 31, 2020, Rudock was re-signed by the Dolphins to their active roster to serve as the team's backup after Ryan Fitzpatrick was placed on the reserve/COVID-19 list.

Rudock retired from professional football on August 2, 2021. It was announced on December 18, 2021, that Rudock had been accepted into the University of Michigan School of Medicine.

== See also ==
- Michigan Wolverines football statistical leaders
