= Tyrone Wheatley Jr. =

American football player (born 1997)

Profile
- Position: Offensive tackle

Personal information
- Born: February 4, 1997 (age 29); Buffalo, New York, U.S.
- Listed height: 6 ft 6 in (1.98 m)
- Listed weight: 320 lb (145 kg)

Career information
- High school: Canisius (Buffalo)
- College: Michigan (2015–2017); Stony Brook (2018)
- NFL draft: 2020: undrafted

Career history
- Chicago Bears (2021–2022)*; Las Vegas Raiders (2022)*; Cleveland Browns (2022–2023)*; New England Patriots (2023); Atlanta Falcons (2024)*
- * Offseason or practice squad member only

Career NFL statistics as of 2024
- Games played: 2
- Stats at Pro Football Reference

Tyrone Wheatley Jr. (born February 4, 1997) is an American professional football offensive tackle. Wheatley played college football for the Michigan Wolverines and Stony Brook Seawolves.

== Early life ==
Wheatley played tight end and defensive end at Canisius High School, where he was also named The Buffalo News' player of the year. He was listed as a four-star prospect by Rivals.com, who ranked him as the 13th best tight end prospect in the nation and the top ranked in New York state. ESPN also named him the No. 12 overall prospect in the nation. As a defensive end, Wheatley was ranked as the 25th-best prospect in the country and the top overall prospect in New York state by Scout.com.

Wheatley also held offers from Alabama, Florida, UCLA and USC, but committed to Michigan, his father's alma mater, on February 4, 2015.

College recruiting
Name	Hometown	School	Height	Weight	Commit date
Tyrone Wheatley Jr. TE/DE	Buffalo, New York	Canisius High School	6 ft 6 in (1.98 m)	245 lb (111 kg)	Feb 4, 2015
Tyrone Wheatley Jr. TE/DE	Recruit ratings: Scout: Rivals: 247Sports: ESPN:				
Overall recruit ranking:
Note: In many cases, Scout, Rivals, 247Sports, On3, and ESPN may conflict in their listings of height and weight.; In these cases, the average was taken. ESPN grades are on a 100-point scale.; Sources: "2015 Team Ranking". Rivals.com.

== College career ==
=== Michigan ===
Wheatley, playing as a tight end, missed his entire true freshman season with a foot injury. He scored his first touchdown against Illinois on October 22, 2016. He finished the season with three receptions for 35 yards, playing in 12 games. In his sophomore season, Wheatley made his first collegiate start against Florida on September 2, 2017. He made three starts in the season, catching three receptions for 26 yards.

Wheatley fractured his metatarsal in his foot in March 2018, ruling him out for spring ball. On August 2, 2018, a day before Michigan started training camp, Wheatley announced that he would be departing the team.

=== Stony Brook ===
On August 5, 2018, Stony Brook announced that Wheatley had transferred to the Seawolves. Moving from FBS to FCS, he was eligible immediately. Wheatley made his first start at tight end for Stony Brook on September 22 against Richmond. Wheatley started in eight games for Stony Brook, recording six receptions for 36 yards on the season.

After the season, Wheatley transferred to Morgan State, where his father, Tyrone Wheatley, was in his first year as the head coach, but did not play in a single game or record any statistics due to injury.

== Professional career ==
Pre-draft measurables
Height	Weight
6 ft 5 in (1.96 m)	265 lb (120 kg)
Values from Pro Day

=== The Spring League ===
Wheatley played for the Blues in the 2021 Spring League season, converting from tight end to offensive tackle.

=== Chicago Bears ===
He signed with the Chicago Bears on June 17, 2021. Wheatley was waived during final roster cuts, but re-signed to the team's practice squad. He signed a reserve/future contract with the Bears on January 11, 2022. He was waived on May 6, 2022.

=== Las Vegas Raiders ===
On May 15, 2022, Wheatley signed with the Las Vegas Raiders. On August 16, 2022, Wheatley was waived by the Raiders.

=== Cleveland Browns ===
On September 20, 2022, Wheatley signed with the practice squad of the Cleveland Browns. He signed a reserve/future contract on January 9, 2023.

=== New England Patriots ===
On August 27, 2023, Wheatley was traded to the New England Patriots in exchange for Pierre Strong Jr. Wheatley played in the first two games of the season on special teams. He was placed on injured reserve on October 14, 2023, with a knee injury. His 21-day window to return from IR was opened on December 13 but was not activated before the season's end.

On August 2, 2024, Wheatley was waived/injured by the Patriots.

=== Atlanta Falcons ===
On October 21, 2024, Wheatley was signed to the Atlanta Falcons practice squad. He signed a reserve/future contract with Atlanta on January 6, 2025. On August 14, Wheatley was waived by the Falcons with an injury designation.

== Personal life ==
Wheatley is the son of Tyrone Wheatley, former Michigan running back and first-round NFL draft pick. Wheatley Sr. is currently the head coach at Wayne State.
