= 2016 Michigan Wolverines football team =

American college football season

2016 Michigan Wolverines football

Orange Bowl, L 32–33 vs. Florida State
- Conference: Big Ten Conference
- East Division

Ranking
- Coaches: No. 10
- AP: No. 10
- Record: 10–3 (7–2 Big Ten)
- Head coach: Jim Harbaugh (2nd season)
- Offensive coordinator: Tim Drevno (2nd season)
- Offensive scheme: Pro-style
- Defensive coordinator: Don Brown (1st season)
- Base defense: 4–3
- MVP: Jabrill Peppers
- Captains: Jake Butt; Chris Wormley
- Home stadium: Michigan Stadium

Uniform
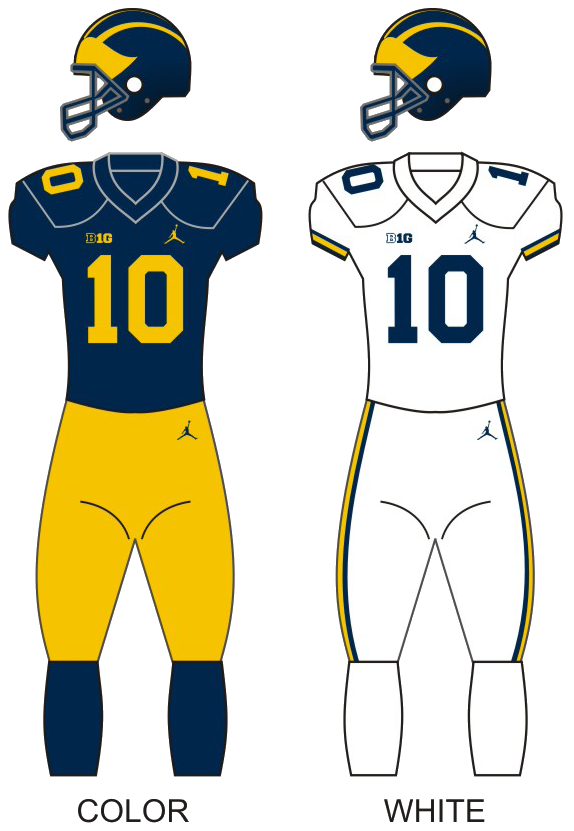

2016 Big Ten Conference football standings
	Conf.			Overall
Team	W		L	W		L
East Division
No. 7 Penn State xy$	8	–	1	11	–	3
No. 6 Ohio State x^	8	–	1	11	–	2
No. 10 Michigan	7	–	2	10	–	3
Indiana	4	–	5	6	–	7
Maryland	3	–	6	6	–	7
Michigan State	1	–	8	3	–	9
Rutgers	0	–	9	2	–	10
West Division
No. 9 Wisconsin xy	7	–	2	11	–	3
Iowa	6	–	3	8	–	5
Nebraska	6	–	3	9	–	4
Minnesota	5	–	4	9	–	4
Northwestern	5	–	4	7	–	6
Illinois	2	–	7	3	–	9
Purdue	1	–	8	3	–	9
Championship: Penn State 38, Wisconsin 31
^ – College Football Playoff participant; $ – Conference champion; x – Division champion/co-champions; y – Championship game participant; Rankings from AP Poll

The 2016 Michigan Wolverines football team represented the University of Michigan in the sport of college football during the 2016 NCAA Division I FBS football season. The Wolverines played in the East Division of the Big Ten Conference and played their home games at Michigan Stadium in Ann Arbor, Michigan. Michigan was led by head coach Jim Harbaugh, who was in his second season.

Coming off the team's first 10-win season in four years in Jim Harbaugh's first season as head coach in 2015, Michigan began the year with high expectations, being ranked seventh in the preseason AP Poll. They won their three non-conference games in dominant fashion. In the following two games, the Wolverines obtained a top 10 victory over Wisconsin. Michigan continued to win, rising to number two in the College Football Playoff rankings at 9–0 before falling on the road to Iowa on a last-second field goal. Two weeks later, Michigan traveled to Columbus, Ohio to face arch-rival Ohio State with an opportunity to claim a spot in the 2016 Big Ten Football Championship Game with a win. The Wolverines lost in double overtime, 30–27, ending the regular season in third in the Eastern Division behind Ohio State and Penn State. Michigan received an invitation to the 2016 Orange Bowl, where they lost to Florida State, 33–32 to end the year at 10–3.

The team was led by unanimous first-team All-American linebacker Jabrill Peppers, who was the Big Ten Defensive Player of the Year and a finalist for the Heisman Trophy, finishing in fifth. Cornerback Jourdan Lewis was also a consensus first-team All-American, as was tight end Jake Butt, who was the recipient of the John Mackey Award as the nation's top tight end. Quarterback Wilton Speight led the team in passing, finishing with 2,538 yards and 18 touchdowns on the year.

== Preseason ==
In 2015, Michigan compiled a 10–3 record (6–2 in conference play) during the regular season and played the Florida Gators in the Citrus Bowl, where Michigan defeated the Gators 41–7. This was Michigan's best record since the 2011 season, which saw Michigan finish with an 11–2 record and a Sugar Bowl victory over Virginia Tech.

Michigan suffered staff attrition when defensive coordinator D. J. Durkin left the program to become the head coach at Maryland. On December 21, 2015, Michigan officially announced the hiring of Don Brown as defensive coordinator. On January 7, 2016, it was officially announced that John Baxter would be leaving Michigan to become the Special Teams coach at USC. In response to both the Baxter and Durkin departures—Durkin had also coached linebackers for Michigan in addition to his position as defensive coordinator—Michigan promoted their recruiting coordinator Chris Partridge to Special Teams and Linebackers coach. On February 18, 2016, Greg Jackson left Michigan to become the defensive backs coach of the Dallas Cowboys. He was replaced by Brian Smith, who most recently served as an assistant linebackers coach with the Philadelphia Eagles under Chip Kelly.

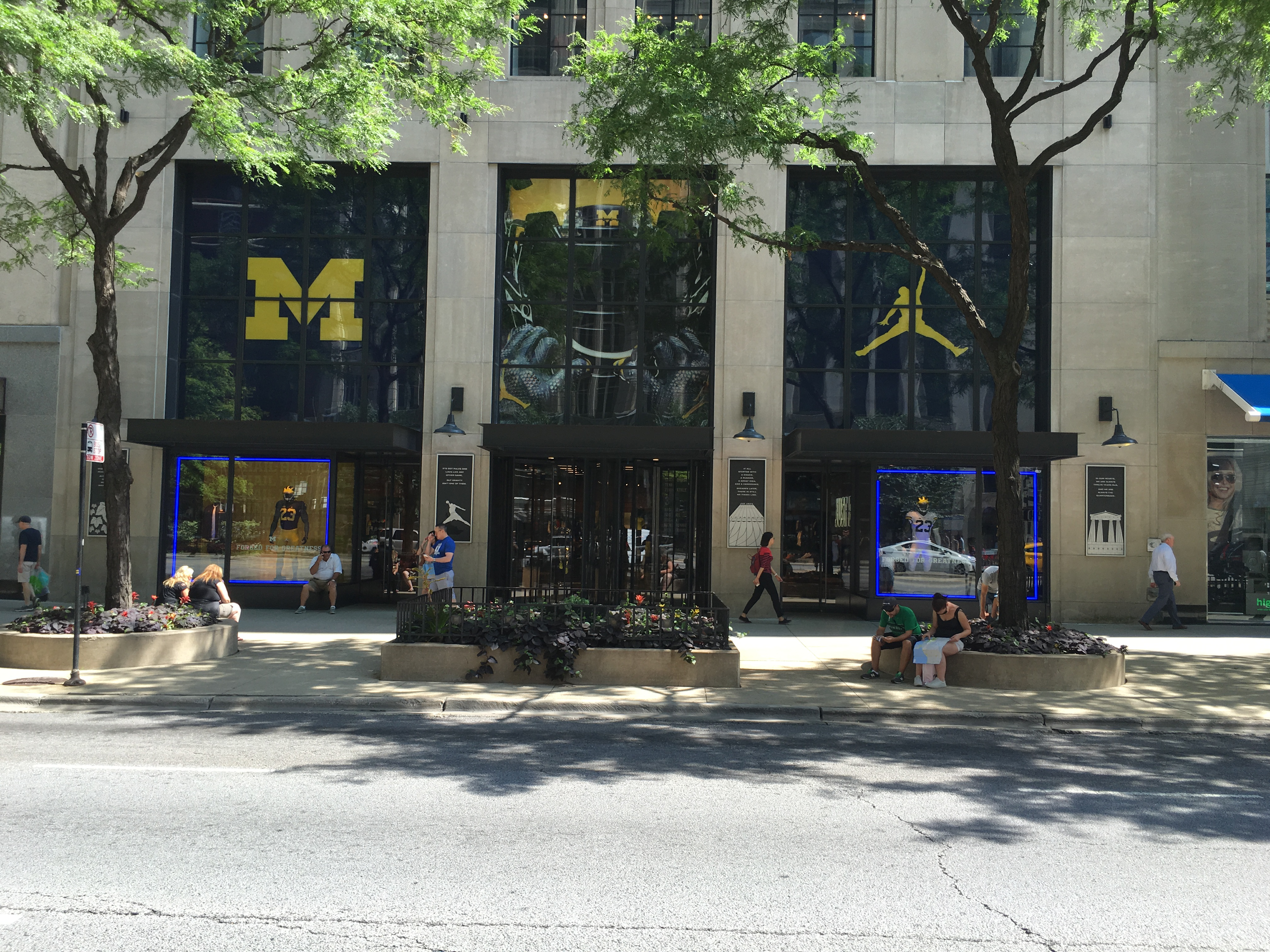
Michigan Wolverines logo and the jumpman logo at the Nike, Inc. flagship store on the Magnificent Mile during the week before the opening game

The team conducted four of its spring practices at the IMG Academy in Bradenton, Florida between February 29 and March 4, 2016, which coincided with the university's annual spring break. The final practice was held as an open practice for fans and recruits, and saw an attendance of over 5,000 people. The practices were considered controversial, as coaches from the SEC and ACC protested what they believed to be an attempt to gain an upper hand in recruiting prospective athletes; however, at the time, no NCAA rules stated that the practices would not be allowed to take place. Michigan also conducted several satellite camps—football camps meant to expose prospective student athletes to colleges who might otherwise not find and recruit them due to distance or other factors—in 22 states, Australia, and American Samoa following the NCAA's reversal of a ban enacted only months prior.

Although agreed to many months earlier, in April, the university announced it had signed an 11-year, $127.12 million contract with Nike, Inc. on March 16 that would go into effect on August 1, 2016, for 31 Michigan Wolverines sports teams to switch from wearing Adidas apparel to Nike. The Wolverines became the first football program to wear the jumpman logo and every piece of football apparel donned by the team that is visible is Jordan Brand attire. Michigan unveiled its new uniforms and gear during a ceremony at the Ford Piquette Avenue Plant on August 2. Michigan alumna Dana Jacobson hosted the event, while former Wolverine great Charles Woodson was also in attendance.

== Recruiting ==
=== Recruits ===
Michigan's recruiting class consisted of 28 recruits, including seven that enrolled early. Michigan's recruiting class was ranked No. 6 by Scout, No. 4 by Rivals, and No. 6 by ESPN. The highlight of the class was the consensus number one recruit in the country, Rashan Gary.

College recruiting
Name	Hometown	School	Height	Weight	40^{‡}	Commit date
Devin Asiasi; TE	Concord, California	De La Salle H.S.	6 ft 5 in (1.96 m)	272 lb (123 kg)	5.08	Feb 3, 2016
Devin Asiasi; TE	Recruit ratings: Scout: Rivals: 247Sports: ESPN:					
Ben Bredeson; OL	Hartland, Wisconsin	Arrowhead H.S.	6 ft 4.5 in (1.94 m)	293 lb (133 kg)	5.31	Jun 17, 2015
Ben Bredeson; OL	Recruit ratings: Scout: Rivals: 247Sports: ESPN:					
Devin Bush Jr. LB	Pembroke Pines, Florida	Flanagan H.S.	5 ft 11 in (1.80 m)	224 lb (102 kg)	4.7	Dec 16, 2015
Devin Bush Jr. LB	Recruit ratings: Scout: Rivals: 247Sports: ESPN:					
Dylan Crawford; WR	Rancho Santa Margarita, California	Santa Margarita Catholic H.S.	6 ft 1 in (1.85 m)	175 lb (79 kg)	4.62	Jan 9, 2016
Dylan Crawford; WR	Recruit ratings: Scout: Rivals: 247Sports: ESPN:					
Kingston Davis; RB	Prattville, Alabama	Prattville H.S.	6 ft 0 in (1.83 m)	242 lb (110 kg)	4.79	Apr 6, 2015
Kingston Davis; RB	Recruit ratings: Scout: Rivals: 247Sports: ESPN:					
Michael Dwumfour; DT	Wayne, New Jersey	Depaul Catholic H.S.	6 ft 2 in (1.88 m)	282 lb (128 kg)	4.89	Jan 25, 2016
Michael Dwumfour; DT	Recruit ratings: Scout: Rivals: 247Sports: ESPN:					
Nick Eubanks; TE	Plantation, Florida	American Heritage H.S.	6 ft 5 in (1.96 m)	215 lb (98 kg)	4.69	Feb 3, 2016
Nick Eubanks; TE	Recruit ratings: Scout: Rivals: 247Sports: ESPN:					
Chris Evans; ATH	Indianapolis, Indiana	Ben Davis H.S.	5 ft 11 in (1.80 m)	181 lb (82 kg)	4.4	Jun 6, 2015
Chris Evans; ATH	Recruit ratings: Scout: Rivals: 247Sports: ESPN:					
Rashan Gary; DT	Paramus, New Jersey	Paramus Catholic H.S.	6 ft 4.5 in (1.94 m)	290 lb (130 kg)	4.86	Feb 3, 2016
Rashan Gary; DT	Recruit ratings: Scout: Rivals: 247Sports: ESPN:					
Devin Gil; DB	Pembroke Pines, Florida	Flanagan H.S.	6 ft 0 in (1.83 m)	204 lb (93 kg)	4.72	Jun 19, 2015
Devin Gil; DB	Recruit ratings: Scout: Rivals: 247Sports: ESPN:					
Brad Hawkins Jr. WR	Camden, New Jersey	Camden H.S.	6 ft 2 in (1.88 m)	195 lb (88 kg)	4.82	Jul 3, 2015
Brad Hawkins Jr. WR	Recruit ratings: Scout: Rivals: 247Sports: ESPN:					
Lavert Hill; CB	Detroit, Michigan	MLK H.S.	5 ft 10 in (1.78 m)	176 lb (80 kg)	4.41	Feb 3, 2016
Lavert Hill; CB	Recruit ratings: Scout: Rivals: 247Sports: ESPN:					
Khaleke Hudson; ATH	McKeesport, Pennsylvania	McKeesport H.S.	5 ft 11 in (1.80 m)	195 lb (88 kg)	4.81	Jan 27, 2016
Khaleke Hudson; ATH	Recruit ratings: Scout: Rivals: 247Sports: ESPN:					
Nate Johnson; WR	Thompson's Station, Tennessee	Independence H.S.	5 ft 11 in (1.80 m)	174 lb (79 kg)	4.5	Dec 12, 2015
Nate Johnson; WR	Recruit ratings: Scout: Rivals: 247Sports: ESPN:					
Ron Johnson; DE	Camden, New Jersey	Camden H.S.	6 ft 3 in (1.91 m)	221 lb (100 kg)	4.60	Jun 25, 2015
Ron Johnson; DE	Recruit ratings: Scout: Rivals: 247Sports: ESPN:					
Carlo Kemp; DE	Boulder, Colorado	Fairview H.S.	6 ft 3 in (1.91 m)	250 lb (110 kg)	4.80	Nov 8, 2015
Carlo Kemp; DE	Recruit ratings: Scout: Rivals: 247Sports: ESPN:					
David Long; CB	Los Angeles, California	Loyola H.S.	6 ft 0 in (1.83 m)	170 lb (77 kg)	4.40	Jan 21, 2016
David Long; CB	Recruit ratings: Scout: Rivals: 247Sports: ESPN:					
Elysee Mbem-Bosse; LB	Ellenwood, Georgia	Cedar Grove H.S.	6 ft 2 in (1.88 m)	228 lb (103 kg)	4.61	Jan 24, 2016
Elysee Mbem-Bosse; LB	Recruit ratings: Scout: Rivals: 247Sports: ESPN:					
Eddie McDoom; WR	Winter Garden, Florida	Atlantic H.S.	6 ft 1 in (1.85 m)	170 lb (77 kg)	4.65	Jan 27, 2016
Eddie McDoom; WR	Recruit ratings: Scout: Rivals: 247Sports: ESPN:					
Sean McKeon; TE	Dudley, Massachusetts	Shepherd Hill H.S.	6 ft 5 in (1.96 m)	230 lb (100 kg)	4.52	Jun 15, 2015
Sean McKeon; TE	Recruit ratings: Scout: Rivals: 247Sports: ESPN:					
Josh Metellus; DB	Pembroke Pines, Florida	Flanagan H.S.	6 ft 0 in (1.83 m)	187 lb (85 kg)	–	Jun 17, 2015
Josh Metellus; DB	Recruit ratings: Scout: Rivals: 247Sports: ESPN:					
Ahmir Mitchell; WR	Wayne, New Jersey	DePaul Catholic H.S.	6 ft 3 in (1.91 m)	195 lb (88 kg)	4.67	Aug 27, 2015
Ahmir Mitchell; WR	Recruit ratings: Scout: Rivals: 247Sports: ESPN:					
Quinn Nordin; K	Rockford, Michigan	Rockford H.S.	6 ft 2 in (1.88 m)	205 lb (93 kg)	–	Feb 3, 2016
Quinn Nordin; K	Recruit ratings: Scout: Rivals: 247Sports: ESPN:					
Michael Onwenu; OL	Detroit, Michigan	Cass Tech H.S.	6 ft 3 in (1.91 m)	367 lb (166 kg)	5.52	Jun 2, 2015
Michael Onwenu; OL	Recruit ratings: Scout: Rivals: 247Sports: ESPN:					
Brandon Peters; QB	Avon, Indiana	Avon H.S.	6 ft 4 in (1.93 m)	209 lb (95 kg)	4.85	Apr 4, 2015
Brandon Peters; QB	Recruit ratings: Scout: Rivals: 247Sports: ESPN:					
Stephen Spanellis; OL	Baltimore, Maryland	Gilman School	6 ft 6 in (1.98 m)	290 lb (130 kg)	5.80	Jan 21, 2016
Stephen Spanellis; OL	Recruit ratings: Scout: Rivals: 247Sports: ESPN:					
Josh Uche; DE	Miami, FL	Columbus H.S.	6 ft 1 in (1.85 m)	217 lb (98 kg)	4.60	Jan 24, 2016
Josh Uche; DE	Recruit ratings: Scout: Rivals: 247Sports: ESPN:					
Kareem Walker; RB	Wayne, New Jersey	DePaul Catholic H.S.	6 ft 1 in (1.85 m)	210 lb (95 kg)	4.50	Dec 17, 2015
Kareem Walker; RB	Recruit ratings: Scout: Rivals: 247Sports: ESPN:					
Overall recruit ranking: Scout: 6 Rivals: 4 247Sports: 5 ESPN: 6
‡ Refers to 40-yard dash; Note: In many cases, Scout, Rivals, 247Sports, On3, and ESPN may conflict in their listings of height, weight and 40 time.; In these cases, the average was taken. ESPN grades are on a 100-point scale.; Sources: "Michigan Football Commitments". Rivals.; "2016 Michigan Football Commits". Scout.; "ESPN". ESPN.; "Scout.com Team Recruiting Rankings". Scout.; "2016 Team Ranking". Rivals.com.

== Schedule ==
Date	Time	Opponent	Rank	Site	TV	Result	Attendance	Source
September 3	12:00 p.m.	Hawaii*	No. 7	Michigan Stadium; Ann Arbor, MI	ESPN	W 63–3	110,222	
September 10	12:00 p.m.	UCF*	No. 5	Michigan Stadium; Ann Arbor, MI	ABC	W 51–14	109,295	
September 17	3:30 p.m.	Colorado*	No. 4	Michigan Stadium; Ann Arbor, MI	BTN	W 45–28	110,042	
September 24	3:30 p.m.	Penn State	No. 4	Michigan Stadium; Ann Arbor, MI (rivalry)	ABC	W 49–10	110,319	
October 1	3:30 p.m.	No. 8 Wisconsin	No. 4	Michigan Stadium; Ann Arbor, MI	ABC	W 14–7	111,846	
October 8	7:00 p.m.	at Rutgers	No. 4	High Point Solutions Stadium; Piscataway, NJ	ESPN2	W 78–0	53,292	
October 22	3:30 p.m.	Illinois^{†}	No. 3	Michigan Stadium; Ann Arbor, MI (rivalry)	BTN	W 41–8	111,103	
October 29	12:00 p.m.	at Michigan State	No. 2	Spartan Stadium; East Lansing, MI (rivalry)	ESPN	W 32–23	75,802	
November 5	3:30 p.m.	Maryland	No. 3	Michigan Stadium; Ann Arbor, MI	ESPN	W 59–3	110,626	
November 12	8:00 p.m.	at Iowa	No. 3	Kinnick Stadium; Iowa City, IA	ABC	L 13–14	70,585	
November 19	3:30 p.m.	Indiana	No. 3	Michigan Stadium; Ann Arbor, MI	ESPN	W 20–10	110,288	
November 26	12:00 p.m.	at No. 2 Ohio State	No. 3	Ohio Stadium; Columbus, OH (The Game, College GameDay)	ABC	L 27–30 ^{2OT}	110,045	
December 30	8:00 p.m.	vs. No. 11 Florida State*	No. 6	Hard Rock Stadium; Miami Gardens, FL (Orange Bowl)	ESPN	L 32–33	67,432	
*Non-conference game; ^{†}Homecoming; Rankings from AP Poll and CFP Rankings after November 1 released prior to game; All times are in Eastern time

== Rankings ==
Entering the season, Michigan was ranked No. 7 in the AP Poll and No. 8 in the Coaches' Poll. Following its opening victory over Hawaii, Michigan rose to No. 5 in the AP Poll and No. 6 in the Coaches' Poll, and then rose to No. 4 in the AP Poll and No. 5 in the Coaches' Poll following its victory over UCF. Michigan held serve in the polls following its victories over Colorado and Penn State. Michigan rose to No. 4 in the Coaches' Poll following its victory over Wisconsin, and remained at No. 4 in both polls following its win over Rutgers. Michigan rose to No. 3 in the AP Poll during its bye week. Michigan rose to No. 2 in both polls following its victory over Michigan State and was ranked No. 3 in the season's first edition of the College Football Playoff (CFP) rankings. Following its loss to Iowa, Michigan fell to No. 4 in both polls, but remained at No. 3 in the CFP rankings. Michigan rose to No. 3 in the AP Poll following its victory over Indiana, and remained at No. 4 in the Coaches' Poll, and No. 3 in the CFP rankings.

Ranking movements Legend: ██ Increase in ranking ██ Decrease in ranking ( ) = First-place votes
	Week															
Poll	Pre	1	2	3	4	5	6	7	8	9	10	11	12	13	14	Final
AP	7 (1)	5 (1)	4 (1)	4 (1)	4 (1)	4 (1)	4 (1)	3 (1)	2 (1)	2 (1)	2 (1)	4	3	5	6	10
Coaches	8	6	5	5	5	4 (1)	4	4	2 (1)	2	3	4	4	6	6	10
CFP	Not released									3	3	3	3	5	6	Not released

== Radio ==
Radio coverage for all games was broadcast statewide on The Michigan IMG Sports Network and on Sirius XM Satellite Radio. The radio announcers are Jim Brandstatter with play-by-play, Dan Dierdorf with color commentary, and Doug Karsch with sideline reports.

== Game summaries ==
=== Vs. Hawaii ===
Hawaii at Michigan

Team	1	2	3	4	Total
Rainbow Warriors	0	0	0	3	3
• #7 Wolverines	14	21	21	7	63

- Date: September 3
- Location: Michigan Stadium
  Ann Arbor, MI
- Game start: 12:01 p.m. EDT
- Elapsed time: 3:17
- Game attendance: 110,222
- Game weather: Mid 70s, Sunny and clear, W 10–15 MPH
- Referee: Jerry McGinn
- TV announcers (ESPN): Mike Patrick, Ed Cunningham & Jerry Punch

Scoring summary
1	7:29	MICH	Grant Perry 12-yard pass from Wilton Speight (Kenny Allen kick)	MICH 7–0
1	1:25	MICH	Jake Butt 19-yard pass from Wilton Speight (Kenny Allen kick)	MICH 14–0
2	11:21	MICH	Amara Darboh 5-yard pass from Wilton Speight (Kenny Allen kick)	MICH 21–0
2	10:36	MICH	Lano Hill 27-yard interception return (Kenny Allen kick)	MICH 28–0
2	6:07	MICH	Chris Evans 18-yard run (Kenny Allen kick)	MICH 35–0
3	13:44	MICH	Chris Evans 43-yard run (Ryan Tice kick)	MICH 42–0
3	10:51	MICH	Channing Stribling 51-yard interception return (Ryan Tice kick)	MICH 49–0
3	:18	MICH	Khalid Hill 4-yard run (Ryan Tice kick)	MICH 56–0
4	12:30	UH	Rigoberto Sanchez 55-yard field goal	MICH 56–3
4	7:15	MICH	Karan Higdon 5-yard run (Ryan Tice kick)	MICH 63–3

To open the season, Michigan hosted the Hawaii Rainbow Warriors. This was the first meeting between the teams since 1998, which saw Michigan defeat Hawaii 48–17.

Michigan won in a blowout, 63–3. Michigan opened the scoring in the first quarter via a 12-yard touchdown pass from Wilton Speight to Grant Perry and added to its lead with a 19-yard touchdown pass from Speight to Jake Butt. Michigan added 21 points in the second quarter via a five-yard touchdown pass from Speight to Amara Darboh, a Lano Hill 27-yard interception return for a touchdown (pick six), and an 18-yard touchdown run from freshman running back Chris Evans, which made the score 35–0 in favor of Michigan at half-time. Michigan extended its lead early in the third quarter with a 43-yard touchdown run from Evans, and then added fourteen more points via a Channing Stribling 51-yard interception return for a touchdown and a four-yard touchdown run from Khalid Hill. Hawaii reduced Michigan's lead to 53 with a 55-yard field goal from Rigoberto Sanchez, but Michigan ended the scoring with a five-yard touchdown run from Karan Higdon.

Michigan's honorary captain for the game was NBA Hall of Famer Michael Jordan, while former Wolverines Charles Woodson and Lamarr Woodley were also honored during the game. Michigan's 60-point margin of victory was the seventh highest margin of victory in program history and the highest since Michigan defeated Northwestern 69–0 in 1975. The game marked the fourth time in program history that Michigan did not punt during a game, and the first time since 2009 (against Delaware State). This was the first time Michigan had two pick sixes in a game since the 1999 Citrus Bowl against Arkansas and the first time since 2011 that it had two defensive touchdowns in one game. Thirty-three Wolverines made their collegiate debut, while seventeen true freshmen appeared in the game, setting a program record. Evans—appearing in his first college game—rushed for 112 yards and two touchdowns on eight carries. He became just the third Wolverine true freshman to surpass 100 rushing yards in his collegiate debut, joining Walter Cross (104 yards, September 12, 1998) and Chris Perry (103 yards, September 2, 2000).

=== Vs. UCF ===
UCF at Michigan

Team	1	2	3	4	Total
Knights	0	7	7	0	14
• #5 Wolverines	21	13	10	7	51

- Date: September 10
- Location: Michigan Stadium
  Ann Arbor, MI
- Game start: 12:06 p.m. EDT
- Elapsed time: 3:27
- Game attendance: 109,295
- Game weather: Mid 70s, Cloudy with rain, SW 15–25 MPH
- Referee: John O'Neill
- TV announcers (ABC): Steve Levy, Brian Griese & Todd McShay

Scoring summary
1	8:48	MICH	Jake Butt 3-yard pass from Wilton Speight (Kenny Allen kick)	MICH 7–0
1	3:29	MICH	Khalid Hill 2-yard run (Kenny Allen kick)	MICH 14–0
1	1:55	MICH	Amara Darboh 45-yard pass from Wilton Speight (Kenny Allen kick)	MICH 21–0
2	14:17	MICH	Kenny Allen 24-yard field goal	MICH 24–0
2	11:30	MICH	Jake Butt 14-yard pass from Wilton Speight (Kenny Allen kick)	MICH 31–0
2	11:10	UCF	Adrian Killins 87-yard run (Matthew Wright kick)	MICH 31–7
2	6:07	MICH	Kenny Allen 36-yard field goal	MICH 34–7
3	11:47	MICH	Khalid Hill 1-yard run (Kenny Allen kick)	MICH 41–7
3	9:44	MICH	Kenny Allen 37-yard field goal	MICH 44–7
3	11:10	UCF	Dontravious Wilson 34-yard run (Matthew Wright kick)	MICH 44–14
4	10:24	MICH	Amara Darboh 30-yard pass from Wilton Speight (Ryan Tice kick)	MICH 51–14

Following its opening game against Hawaii, Michigan hosted the Central Florida (UCF) Knights. This was the first ever meeting between the two teams.

Michigan won in another lopsided victory, 51–14. Michigan opened the scoring in the first quarter via a three-yard touchdown pass from Speight to Butt, and added to its lead via a two-yard touchdown run from Hill and a 45-yard touchdown pass from Speight to Darboh. Michigan added 13 points in the second quarter via a 24-yard, and 36-yard field goal from Allen, and a 14-yard touchdown pass from Speight to Butt. UCF reduced Michigan's lead to 27 points via an 87-yard touchdown run from Adrian Killins, which made the score 34–7 in favor of Michigan at half-time. Michigan extended its lead in the third quarter via a one-yard touchdown run from Hill and a 37-yard field goal by Allen. UCF reduced Michigan's lead to 30 points via a 34-yard touchdown run from Dontravious Wilson. Michigan ended the scoring in the fourth quarter with a 30-yard touchdown pass from Speight to Darboh.

Michigan posted back-to-back 50-plus-point performances for the first time since 1992. Michigan combined for 114 total points in its first two games of the season, the most in program history in more than 100 years. Over his first two games, Speight has seven touchdown passes, tying him with John Navarre for the most touchdown passes in the first two games of a season by a Michigan quarterback. Butt had seven receptions with two touchdowns for the first multi-touchdown game of his career. Butt's seven receptions give him 100 for his career, moving him into third place for career receptions by a tight end.

=== Vs. Colorado ===
Colorado at Michigan

Team	1	2	3	4	Total
Buffaloes	21	0	7	0	28
• #4 Wolverines	7	17	14	7	45

- Date: September 17
- Location: Michigan Stadium
  Ann Arbor, MI
- Game start: 3:42 pm EDT
- Elapsed time: 3:22
- Game attendance: 110,042
- Game weather: Mid 70s, Cloudy with possible rain, SW 10–15 MPH
- Referee: Mike Cannon
- TV announcers (BTN): Kevin Kugler, Matt Millen & Lisa Byington

Scoring summary
1	12:37	COLO	Devin Ross 37-yard pass from Sefo Liufau (Diego Gonzalez kick)	COLO 7–0
1	11:48	COLO	Dere McCartney 18-yard fumble return (Diego Gonzalez kick)	COLO 14–0
1	8:27	MICH	Grant Perry 6-yard blocked punt return (Kenny Allen kick)	COLO 14–7
1	3:49	COLO	Devin Ross 6-yard pass from Sefo Liufau (Diego Gonzalez)	COLO 21–7
2	8:49	MICH	Jehu Chesson 17-yard run (Kenny Allen kick)	COLO 21–14
2	1:59	MICH	Kenny Allen 39-yard field goal	COLO 21–17
2	:33	MICH	Amara Darboh 45-yard pass from Wilton Speight (Kenny Allen kick)	MICH 24–21
3	14:02	MICH	Shay Fields 70-yard pass from Sefo Liufau (Diego Gonzalez kick)	COLO 28–24
3	13:16	MICH	De'Veon Smith 42-yard run (Kenny Allen kick)	MICH 31–28
3	3:06	MICH	Ty Isaac 1-yard run (Kenny Allen kick)	MICH 38–28
4	11:27	MICH	Jabrill Peppers 54-yard punt return (Kenny Allen kick)	MICH 45–28

After playing UCF, Michigan hosted the Colorado Buffaloes. This was the first meeting between the schools since 1997, which saw Michigan win its opener en route to a national championship.

Michigan overcame a 14-point first quarter deficit and won the game 45–28. This was the 14th time that Michigan has overcome a deficit of 14 points or more to win. Colorado opened the scoring in the first quarter via a 37-yard touchdown pass from Sefo Liufau to Devin Ross and added to its lead via an 18-yard fumble recovery for a touchdown by Dere McCartney. Michigan responded with a six-yard blocked punt touchdown return by Grant Perry, which reduced Colorado's lead to seven points. Colorado regained its 14-point lead via a six-yard touchdown pass from Liufau to Devin Ross. Michigan responded with 17 unanswered points in the second quarter: a 17-yard touchdown run from Jehu Chesson, a 39-yard field goal by Kenny Allen, and a 45-yard touchdown pass from Speight to Darboh, which made the score 24–21 in favor of Michigan at half-time. Colorado regained the lead in the third quarter via a 70-yard touchdown pass from Liufau to Shay Fields; Liufau suffered an injury on the play and was replaced by Steven Montez for the remainder of the game. Michigan then regained the lead with a 42-yard touchdown run from De'Veon Smith. Michigan added to its lead with a one-yard touchdown run from Ty Isaac, and then ended the scoring in the fourth quarter with a 54-yard punt return for a touchdown from Jabrill Peppers.

Michigan's honorary captains for the game were former Michigan and then-current New England Patriots quarterback Tom Brady and Activision Blizzard CEO Bobby Kotick. Michigan has combined for 159 total points over its first three games of the 2016 season, the most over that stretch in program history. Michigan scored two touchdowns off punts returns in a single game for just the second time in program history, and the first time since 1954. Jake Butt posted seven receptions for 87 yards and moved into third among Michigan's all-time leaders in receiving yards by a tight end with 1,292.

=== Vs. Penn State ===
Penn State at Michigan

Team	1	2	3	4	Total
Nittany Lions	0	0	3	7	10
• #4 Wolverines	14	14	7	14	49

- Date: September 24
- Location: Michigan Stadium
  Ann Arbor, MI
- Game start: 3:41 pm EDT
- Elapsed time: 3:20
- Game attendance: 110,319
- Game weather: Low 70s, Mostly sunny, N 10–15 MPH
- Referee: Dan Capron
- TV announcers (ABC): Dave Flemming, Brian Griese & Todd McShay

Scoring summary
1	9:51	MICH	Khalid Hill 1-yard run (Kenny Allen kick)	MICH 7–0
1	3:57	MICH	De'Veon Smith 2-yard run (Kenny Allen kick)	MICH 14–0
2	14:09	MICH	Devin Asiasi 3-yard pass from Wilton Speight (Kenny Allen kick)	MICH 21–0
2	0:46	MICH	Karan Higdon 2-yard run (Kenny Allen kick)	MICH 28–0
3	11:31	PSU	Tyler Davis 21-yard field goal	MICH 28–3
3	2:42	MICH	Chris Evans 3-yard run (Kenny Allen kick)	MICH 35–3
4	11:22	PSU	Chris Godwin 8-yard pass from Trace McSorley (Tyler Davis kick)	MICH 35–10
4	6:11	MICH	Karan Higdon 40-yard run (Kenny Allen kick)	MICH 42–10
4	2:04	MICH	Ty Isaac 3-yard run (Kenny Allen kick)	MICH 49–10

Following its game against Colorado, Michigan began its Big Ten portion of the schedule when it hosted the Penn State Nittany Lions. Michigan defeated Penn State 28–16 in the previous meeting.

Michigan won in another blowout, 49–10. Michigan opened the scoring in the first quarter via a one-yard touchdown run from Khalid Hill, and a two-yard touchdown run from De'Veon Smith. Michigan added to its lead in the second quarter via a three-yard touchdown pass from Wilton Speight to Devin Asiasi, and a two-yard touchdown run from Karan Higdon, which made the score 28–0 in favor of Michigan at half-time. Penn State reduced Michigan's lead to 25 with a 21-yard field goal by Tyler Davis in the third quarter. Michigan responded with a three-yard touchdown run from Chris Evans. Penn State opened the scoring in the fourth quarter via an eight-yard pass from Trace McSorley to Chris Godwin. Michigan responded with a 40-yard touchdown run from Karan Higdon, before Ty Isaac added the final points of the game via a three-yard touchdown run.

Michigan's honorary captain for the game was alumnus Don Graham, the founder of Michigan's Graham Sustainability Institute. Michigan has combined for 208 total points over its first four games of the 2016 season, the most over that stretch in program history. Michigan has scored 40 or more points in each of its first four games for the first time since 1947. Michigan posted a season best six sacks, the most in a game since 2014 against Northwestern.

With the win, the Wolverines also retook the all time college football winning percentage from its rival Notre Dame.

=== Vs. Wisconsin ===
Wisconsin at Michigan

Team	1	2	3	4	Total
#8 Badgers	0	0	7	0	7
• #4 Wolverines	0	7	0	7	14

- Date: October 1
- Location: Michigan Stadium
  Ann Arbor, MI
- Game start: 3:41 pm EDT
- Elapsed time: 3:21
- Game attendance: 111,846
- Game weather: High 60s, Cloudy possible rain, SE 10–15 MPH
- Referee: Ron Snodgrass
- TV announcers (ABC): Steve Levy, Brian Griese & Todd McShay

Scoring summary
2	14:56	MICH	Khalid Hill 1-yard run (Kenny Allen kick)	MICH 7–0
3	8:03	WIS	Dare Ogunbowale 17-yard pass from Alex Hornibrook (Andrew Endicott kick)	Tie 7–7
4	7:56	MICH	Amara Darboh 46-yard pass from Wilton Speight (Ryan Tice kick)	MICH 14–7

After facing Penn State, Michigan hosted the Wisconsin Badgers. Despite being in the same conference, these teams had not met since 2010, when Wisconsin defeated Michigan 48–28.

Michigan defeated Wisconsin in a defensive battle, 14–7. After neither team scored in the first quarter, Michigan opened the scoring in the second quarter via a one-yard touchdown run from Khalid Hill, which made the score 7–0 in favor of Michigan at half-time. Wisconsin responded in the third quarter with a 17-yard touchdown pass from Alex Hornibrook to Dare Ogunbowale. Michigan re-gained the lead and ended the scoring in the fourth quarter via a 46-yard touchdown pass from Speight to Darboh.

Michigan's honorary captain for the game was former faculty athletics representative, and current University of Michigan English professor Anne Curzan. The win was Michigan's first over a top-10 opponent since beating Wisconsin in 2008, 27–25, ending a streak of 12 consecutive such losses (including two under Harbaugh). Michigan was 0 for 3 on Field Goal attempts.

=== At Rutgers ===
Michigan at Rutgers

Team	1	2	3	4	Total
• #4 Wolverines	14	29	14	21	78
Scarlet Knights	0	0	0	0	0

- Date: October 8
- Location: High Point Solutions Stadium
  Piscataway, NJ
- Game start: 7:10 pm EDT
- Elapsed time: 3:26
- Game attendance: 53,292
- Game weather: 65º F, Rainy, W 2 MPH
- Referee: Mike Cannon
- TV announcers (ESPN2): Jason Benetti, Kelly Stouffer & Paul Carcaterra

Scoring summary
1	7:44	MICH	Ty Isaac 4-yard run (Kenny Allen kick)	MICH 7–0
1	4:27	MICH	Jehu Chesson 30-yard pass from Wilton Speight (Kenny Allen kick)	MICH 14–0
2	14:55	MICH	Jabrill Peppers 7-yard run (Kenny Allen kick)	MICH 21–0
2	11:57	MICH	Khalid Hill 1-yard run (Garrett Moores 2-point rush successful)	MICH 29–0
2	7:18	MICH	Khalid Hill 1-yard run (Kenny Allen kick)	MICH 36–0
2	2:10	MICH	Jabrill Peppers 4-yard run (Kenny Allen kick)	MICH 43–0
3	10:28	MICH	Khalid Hill 11-yard pass from John O'Korn (Kenny Allen kick)	MICH 50–0
3	8:17	MICH	Karan Higdon 15-yard run (Kenny Allen kick)	MICH 57–0
4	12:45	MICH	Bobby Henderson 13-yard run (Ryan Tice kick)	MICH 64–0
4	9:20	MICH	Karan Higdon 44-yard run (Ryan Tice kick)	MICH 71–0
4	7:56	MICH	Ty Isaac 34-yard run (Ryan Tice kick)	MICH 78–0

After its game against Wisconsin, Michigan traveled to New Jersey to face Rutgers in Michigan's first road game of the season. Michigan defeated Rutgers 49–16 in the previous meeting.

Michigan won in a historic blowout, 78–0. Michigan opened the scoring in the first quarter via a four-yard touchdown run from Ty Isaac. Michigan added to its lead via a 30-yard touchdown pass from Speight to Chesson. Michigan added 29 points in the second quarter via a seven-yard touchdown run from Peppers, two one-yard touchdown runs from Hill, a two-point conversion Garrett Moores rush, and a four-yard touchdown run from Peppers, which made the score 43–0 in favor of Michigan at half-time. Michigan added 14 points in the third quarter via an 11-yard touchdown pass from John O'Korn to Hill, and a 15-yard touchdown run from Karan Higdon. Michigan added 21 points in the fourth quarter via a 13-yard touchdown run from Bobby Henderson, a 44-yard touchdown run from Higdon, and a 34-yard touchdown run from Isaac.

The game was a statistical domination for Michigan. Michigan accumulated 600 yards of offense and eleven touchdowns (nine rushing, two passing); the nine rushing touchdowns tied for the most in modern program history. Khalid Hill recorded three touchdown scores, making him the first Michigan player with three or more scores since Chesson had four in 2015 against Indiana. Michigan improved to 6–0 for the first time since 2011 and recorded its first shutout since the previous season against Northwestern. Michigan's defense held Rutgers to only 39 total yards, two first downs, 14 three-and-outs and 0-for-17 on third down. Michigan recorded its largest margin of victory—during either conference or non-conference play—since it defeated Chicago 85–0 in 1939. This was also the largest margin of victory in any Big Ten game since the same Michigan victory over Chicago. The defeat was Rutgers' worst loss since an 82–0 loss to Princeton in 1888.

=== Vs. Illinois ===
Illinois at Michigan
(Homecoming game)

Team	1	2	3	4	Total
Fighting Illini	0	0	0	8	8
• #3 Wolverines	21	10	3	7	41

- Date: October 22
- Location: Michigan Stadium
  Ann Arbor, MI
- Game start: 3:36 pm EDT
- Elapsed time: 3:11
- Game attendance: 111,103
- Game weather: Low 50s, Partly cloudy, NW 20–30 MPH
- Referee: Ron Snodgrass
- TV announcers (BTN): Kevin Kugler, Matt Millen & Lisa Byington

Scoring summary
1	10:23	MICH	Jake Butt 3-yard pass from Wilton Speight (Kenny Allen kick)	MICH 7–0
1	7:52	MICH	Tyrone Wheatley 21-yard pass from Wilton Speight (Kenny Allen kick)	MICH 14–0
1	1:01	MICH	Khalid Hill 1-yard run (Kenny Allen kick)	MICH 21–0
2	11:00	MICH	De'Veon Smith 4-yard run (Kenny Allen kick)	MICH 28–0
2	0:00	MICH	Kenny Allen 23-yard field goal	MICH 31–0
3	0:43	MICH	Kenny Allen 27-yard field goal	MICH 34–0
4	10:22	ILL	Malik Turner 43-yard pass from Jeff George, Jr. (Zach Grant pass from Jeff George, Jr.)	MICH 34–8
4	8:48	MICH	Karan Higdon 45-yard run (Ryan Tice kick)	MICH 41–8

Following its clash with Rutgers and its bye week, Michigan hosted the Illinois Fighting Illini for its homecoming game. This was the first meeting between the schools since 2012, which saw Michigan defeat Illinois 45–0.

Michigan won the game, 41–8. Michigan scored 21 points in the first quarter via a three-yard touchdown pass from Wilton Speight to Jake Butt, a 21-yard touchdown pass from Speight to Tyrone Wheatley Jr., and a one-yard touchdown run from Khalid Hill. Michigan added to its lead in the second with a four-yard touchdown run from De'Veon Smith, and a 23-yard field goal by Kenny Allen, which made the score 31–0 in favor of Michigan at half-time. Michigan added to its lead with a 27-yard field goal by Allen in the third quarter. Illinois responded in the fourth quarter with a 43-yard touchdown pass from Jeff George Jr. to Malik Turner, and a two-point conversion pass from George to Zach Grant, before Michigan added the final points of the game via a 45-yard touchdown run from Karan Higdon.

Michigan's honorary captain for the game was MLB Hall of Famer Hank Aaron. Michigan improved to 7–0 for the first time since 2006. Jake Butt recorded his fourth touchdown of the season—the 11th of his career—to gain sole possession of second place on Michigan's list of career touchdowns by a tight end, four behind leader Jerame Tuman (15). Amara Darboh extended his streak of consecutive games with a catch to 27 and now holds sole possession of the sixth spot among Michigan leaders in the category. Michigan's defense held Illinois to 172 total yards, and without a passing yard in the first half. This was the fourth straight game that Michigan has held an opponent to less than 200 yards.

=== At Michigan State ===
Michigan at Michigan State
(Paul Bunyan Trophy)

Team	1	2	3	4	Total
• #2 Wolverines	7	20	0	5	32
Spartans	7	3	0	13	23

- Date: October 29
- Location: Spartan Stadium
  East Lansing, MI
- Game start: 12:01 pm EDT
- Elapsed time: 3:46
- Game attendance: 75,802
- Game weather: 68º F, Overcast, WSW 11 MPH
- Referee: Don Willard
- TV announcers (ESPN): Bob Wischusen, Brock Huard & Allison Williams

Scoring summary
1	7:58	MSU	LJ Scott 5-yard run (Michael Geiger kick)	MSU 7–0
1	4:30	MICH	Jabrill Peppers 3-yard run (Kenny Allen kick)	Tie 7–7
2	12:19	MICH	De'Veon Smith 1-yard run (Kenny Allen kick)	MICH 14–7
2	9:24	MSU	Michael Geiger 52-yard field goal	MICH 14–10
2	6:41	MICH	Kenny Allen 23-yard field goal	MICH 17–10
2	:39	MICH	De'Veon Smith 5-yard run (Kenny Allen kick)	MICH 24–10
2	0:00	MICH	Kenny Allen 23-yard field goal	MICH 27–10
4	14:42	MICH	Kenny Allen 45-yard field goal	MICH 30–10
4	7:31	MSU	Monty Madaris 20-yard pass form Brian Lewerke (Michael Geiger kick)	MICH 30–17
4	0:01	MSU	Donnie Corley 20-yard pass form Tyler O'Connor (Tyler O'Connor run failed)	MICH 30–23
4	0:01	MICH	Jabrill Peppers defensive PAT return	MICH 32–23

After its homecoming game against Illinois, Michigan traveled to East Lansing to face its in-state rival, the Michigan State Spartans, for the Paul Bunyan Trophy. Michigan State defeated Michigan 27–23 in the previous season after returning a fumbled snap for a touchdown with no time remaining in the game.

Michigan defeated Michigan State, 32–23, for its first win against the Spartans since 2012 and its first win at Spartan Stadium since 2007. Michigan State opened the scoring in the first quarter with a five-yard touchdown run from LJ Scott, which capped off an opening drive that lasted seven minutes and two seconds. Michigan responded with a three-yard touchdown run from Jabrill Peppers and then took the lead in the second quarter with a one-yard touchdown run from De'Veon Smith. Michigan State reduced Michigan's lead to four with a 52-yard field goal from Michael Geiger, but Kenny Allen answered with a 23-yard field goal for Michigan. Michigan scored twice in the final minute of the half with a five-yard touchdown run from Smith and another 23-yard field goal from Allen, which gave Michigan a 27–10 lead at half-time. Michigan extended its lead to 20 in the fourth quarter with a 45-yard field goal from Allen, and coasted from there. Michigan State reduced Michigan's lead to seven points with a 5-yard touchdown pass from Tyler O'Connor to Donnie Corley with :01 left on the clock. On an ensuing two-point conversion attempt, O'Connor fumbled the ball and Peppers returned it for a two-point conversion for Michigan to close out the game.

Michigan improved to 8–0 for the first time since 2006. Michigan's 5–0 record in Big Ten play is the best start to conference play for Michigan since its 6–0 start in 2007. With three receptions today, Jake Butt passed Jim Mandich (119 catches) for the second-most receptions by a tight end in Michigan history. Butt now has 121 career catches.

=== Vs. Maryland ===
Maryland at Michigan

Team	1	2	3	4	Total
Terrapins	0	0	0	3	3
• #2 Wolverines	14	21	10	14	59

- Date: November 5
- Location: Michigan Stadium
  Ann Arbor, MI
- Game start: 3:35 pm EST
- Elapsed time: 3:09
- Game attendance: 110,626
- Game weather: Mid 60s, Sunny some clouds, SW 10–15 MPH
- Referee: Jeff Servinski
- TV announcers (ESPN): Steve Levy, Brian Griese & Todd McShay

Scoring summary
1	9:50	MICH	Amara Darboh 34-yard pass from Wilton Speight (Kenny Allen kick)	MICH 7–0
1	2:56	MICH	Wilton Speight 10-yard run (Kenny Allen kick)	MICH 14–0
2	9:15	MICH	De'Veon Smith 3-yard run (Kenny Allen kick)	MICH 21–0
2	3:52	MICH	Khalid Hill 1-yard run (Kenny Allen kick)	MICH 28–0
2	0:42	MICH	Jehu Chesson 33-yard pass from Wilton Speight (Kenny Allen kick)	MICH 35–0
3	10:00	MICH	Kenny Allen 29-yard field goal	MICH 38–0
3	0:00	MICH	De'Veon Smith 1-yard run (Kenny Allen kick)	MICH 45–0
4	10:34	UMD	Adam Greene 37-yard field goal	MICH 45–3
4	9:07	MICH	De'Veon Smith 2-yard run (Kenny Allen kick)	MICH 52–3
4	3:26	MICH	Kekoa Crawford 9-yard pass from John O'Korn (Kenny Allen kick)	MICH 59–3

After facing Michigan State, Michigan hosted the Maryland Terrapins. Maryland was led by Michigan's former defensive coordinator D. J. Durkin. In the 2015 contest, Michigan defeated Maryland, 28–0.

Michigan won in another blowout, 59–3. Michigan opened the scoring in the first quarter via a 34-yard touchdown pass from Speight to Darboh. Michigan added to its lead via a ten-yard touchdown run from Speight. Michigan added 21 points in the second quarter via a three-yard touchdown run from De'Veon Smith, a one-yard touchdown run from Khalid Hill and a 33-yard touchdown pass from Speight to Chesson, which made the score 35–0 in favor of Michigan at half-time. Michigan added 10 points in the third quarter via a 29-yard field goal from Kenny Allen, and a one-yard touchdown run from Smith. Maryland opened the scoring in the fourth quarter via a 37-yard field goal from Adam Greene, for their only points of the game. Michigan responded with 14 points via a two-yard touchdown run from Smith, his third rushing touchdown of the game, and a nine-yard touchdown pass from John O'Korn to Kekoa Crawford.

Michigan improved to 9–0 for the first time since 2006. Wilton Speight set a program record for the most passing yards in the first half with 292 yards. The previous record-holder was Denard Robinson, who had 262 vs. Illinois in 2010. This was the first game the Wolverine offense featured a 300-yard passer (Wilton Speight, 362), a 100-yard rusher (De'Veon Smith, 114) and a 100-yard receiver (Jehu Chesson, 112) since October 19, 2013, vs. Indiana. Jake Butt became the program's all-time leader for receiving yards from a tight end (1,521), surpassing the previous record set by Jim Mandich (1,508). Michigan's defense combined for 13 tackles-for loss, tying a season record.

=== At Iowa ===
Michigan at Iowa

Team	1	2	3	4	Total
#2 Wolverines	3	7	0	3	13
• Hawkeyes	0	8	3	3	14

- Date: November 12
- Location: Kinnick Stadium
  Iowa City, IA
- Game start: 7:12 pm EST
- Elapsed time: 3:19
- Game attendance: 70,585
- Game weather: 41º F, Mostly cloudy, S 4 MPH
- Referee: John O'Neill
- TV announcers (ABC): Chris Fowler, Kirk Herbstreit & Samantha Ponder

Scoring summary
1	4:00	MICH	Kenny Allen 26-yard field goal	MICH 3–0
2	8:56	MICH	Ty Isaac 7-yard run (Kenny Allen kick)	MICH 10–0
2	6:31	IOWA	Jaleel Johnson safety	MICH 10–2
2	1:27	IOWA	Akrum Wadley 3-yard pass from C. J. Beathard (C. J. Beathard pass failed)	MICH 10–8
3	9:55	IOWA	Keith Duncan 25-yard field goal	IOWA 11–10
4	9:35	MICH	Kenny Allen 51-yard field goal	MICH 13–11
4	0:00	IOWA	Keith Duncan 33-yard field goal	IOWA 14–13

After hosting Maryland, Michigan traveled to Iowa City, Iowa to face the Iowa Hawkeyes. This was the first meeting between the two schools since Iowa defeated Michigan 24–21 in 2013.

Iowa upset Michigan, 13–14. Michigan opened the scoring in the first quarter via a 26-yard field goal from Kenny Allen. Michigan extended its lead in the second quarter via a seven-yard touchdown run from Ty Isaac. Iowa responded with a Jaleel Johnson safety and a three-yard touchdown pass from C. J. Beathard to Akrum Wadley, which made the score 10–8 in favor of Michigan at half-time. Iowa took their first lead of the game via a 25-yard field goal from Keith Duncan. Michigan responded with a 51-yard field goal from Allen, to regain the lead, before Duncan scored the game-winning 33-yard field goal as time expired.

Michigan's 37 rushing scores are the third most for the team since 1970, trailing only the 43 touchdowns scored by the 1976 team and the 47 scored by the 1971 team. The game was similar to the 1985 match-up between the two teams, when No. 1 ranked Iowa defeated No. 2 ranked Michigan, quarterbacked by now Michigan head coach Jim Harbaugh, on a game-winning field goal from Rob Houghtlin as time expired. After losses by No. 3 ranked Clemson, and No. 4 ranked Washington earlier in the day, and the loss by No. 2 ranked Michigan, this marked the first time since October 19, 1985 that Nos. 2–4 all lost on the same day. In the days following the game, it was erroneously reported by blogger Brian Cook of the "mgoblog" fan website that Speight had endured a broken collarbone during the game and may be lost for the rest of the season. However, he returned for the game against Ohio State.

=== Vs. Indiana ===
Indiana at Michigan

Team	1	2	3	4	Total
Hoosiers	0	7	3	0	10
• #4 Wolverines	0	3	17	0	20

- Date: November 19
- Location: Michigan Stadium
  Ann Arbor, MI
- Game start: 3:35 EST
- Elapsed time: 3:14
- Game attendance: 110,288
- Game weather: High 30s, Cloudy, rain/snow, NW 20–30 MPH
- Referee: Jerry McGinn
- TV announcers (ESPN): Dave Pasch, Greg McElroy & Tom Luginbill

Scoring summary
2	8:48	MICH	Kenny Allen 28-yard field goal	MICH 3–0
2	4:00	IND	Camion Patrick 2-yard run (Griffin Oakes kick)	IND 7–3
3	9:40	MICH	Kenny Allen 33-yard field goal	IND 7–6
3	5:21	IND	Griffin Oakes 24-yard field goal	IND 10–6
3	4:02	MICH	De'Veon Smith 34-yard run (Kenny Allen kick)	MICH 13–10
3	0:29	MICH	De'Veon Smith 39-yard run (Kenny Allen kick)	MICH 20–10

Following its game against Iowa, Michigan played its final home game against Indiana. Michigan defeated Indiana 48–41 in double overtime the previous season.

Michigan defeated Indiana, 20–10. After neither team scored in the first quarter, Michigan opened the scoring in the second quarter via a 28-yard field goal from Kenny Allen. Indiana responded with a two-yard touchdown run from Camion Patrick, which made the score 7–3 in favor of Indiana at half-time. Michigan reduced Indiana's lead to one point via a 33-yard field goal from Allen. Indiana extended its lead in the third quarter via a 24-yard field goal from Griffin Oakes. Michigan responded with 14 unanswered points via two touchdown runs from De'Veon Smith, one from 34-yards, and one from 39-yards.

Michigan improved to 10–1, achieving back-to-back double-digit win seasons for the first time since 2002–03. It is the 28th time in program history that Michigan reached 10 wins. Jim Harbaugh is one of only two coaches in program history to win 10 games in each of his first two seasons as head coach, joining Fielding Yost (1901–02). Senior quarterback John O'Korn made his first start since the 2014 season. With two pass breakups against the Hoosiers, cornerback Jourdan Lewis upped his career total to 43 to tie Leon Hall (2003–06) for the most in Michigan history.

=== At Ohio State ===
Michigan at Ohio State
(The Game)

Team	1	2	3	4	OT	2OT	Total
#3 Wolverines	0	10	7	0	7	3	27
• #2 Buckeyes	0	7	7	3	7	6	30

- Date: November 26
- Location: Ohio Stadium
  Columbus, OH
- Game start: 12:00 EST
- Elapsed time: 3:51
- Game attendance: 110,045
- Game weather: 43º F, Partly cloudy, W 10 MPH
- Referee: Daniel Capron
- TV announcers (ABC): Chris Fowler, Kirk Herbstreit, Samantha Ponder, Tom Rinaldi

Scoring summary
2	13:31	MICH	Kenny Allen 28-yard field goal	MICH 3–0
2	4:03	OSU	Malik Hooker 16-yard interception return (Durbin Tyler kick)	OSU 7–3
2	0:06	MICH	Khalid Hill 1-yard run (Kenny Allen kick)	MICH 10–7
3	6:37	MICH	Khalid Hill 8-yard pass from Wilton Speight (Kenny Allen kick)	MICH 17–7
3	1:06	OSU	Mike Weber 1-yard run (Tyler Durbin kick)	MICH 17–14
4	0:01	OSU	Durbin Tyler 23-yard field goal	Tie 17–17
OT	0:00	OSU	J. T. Barrett 7-yard run (Tyler Durbin kick)	OSU 24–17
OT	0:00	MICH	Amara Darboh 5-yard pass from Wilton Speight (Kenny Allen kick)	Tie 24–24
2OT	0:00	MICH	Kenny Allen 37-yard field goal	MICH 27–24
2OT	0:00	OSU	Curtis Samuel 15-yard run	OSU 30–27

Following its home finale against Indiana, Michigan faced its arch-rivals, the Ohio State Buckeyes, in the 113th meeting of "The Game". In the previous meeting, Ohio State defeated Michigan for the fourth consecutive year, winning 42–13.

Michigan lost to Ohio State 27–30 in double overtime. After neither team scored in the first quarter, Michigan opened the scoring in the second quarter via a 28-yard field goal from Kenny Allen. Ohio State responded with a 16-yard interception return from Malik Hooker. Michigan closed the scoring in the first half via a one-yard touchdown run from Khalid Hill, which made the score 10–7 in favor of Michigan at halftime. Michigan extended their lead in the third quarter via an eight-yard touchdown pass from Wilton Speight to Hill. Ohio State reduced Michigan's lead to three points via a one-yard touchdown run from Mike Weber, before Tyler Durbin recorded a 23-yard field goal as time expired in the fourth quarter to tie the game and force overtime. In overtime, Ohio State scored via a seven-yard touchdown run from J. T. Barrett. Michigan responded with a five-yard touchdown pass from Speight to Amara Darboh to force double overtime. In double overtime, Michigan scored via a 37-yard field goal from Allen, before Curtis Samuel recorded a 15-yard touchdown run to win the game, after J. T. Barrett was ruled to have converted a 4th down on the previous play. Whether Barrett's 4th down play had been successful or not would be a major point of discussion following the game.

Dave Adolph served as honorary captain for both Michigan and Ohio State. The game marked the 11th time that Michigan and Ohio State took the field both in the nation's top-five rankings; and is just the second time that both programs were ranked in the nation's top three. The other was the No. 1 vs. No. 2 matchup in 2006 at Ohio Stadium. The game also marked the first overtime in the Michigan-Ohio State rivalry. Michigan's defense recorded a season-best eight sacks against Ohio State. It is the program's most since posting nine against Notre Dame on September 15, 2007. The Wolverines have recorded at least three sacks in each of the last four games. Wide receiver Amara Darboh surpassed the 2,000-yard receiving milestone in the contest. Darboh caught eight passes for 68 receiving yards, upping his career total to 2,026. Darboh has recorded a reception in 32 consecutive games, earning a share of the fourth spot among Michigan's all-time leaders in the category. He is tied with Marquise Walker (1998–2001).

The Big Ten fined Head Coach Jim Harbaugh and the school $10,000 for violating their sportsmanship policy after he was critical of the officiating crew at a post-game press conference.

Oddly, this game did not air on Pittsburgh ABC affiliate WTAE-TV's main signal, but rather, on ESPN2 and on the This TV digital subchannel the station had at the time. The main channel aired a game between the Pitt Panthers and Syracuse Orange instead.

Statistics

Statistic	OSU	MICH
Total yards	330	310
Passing yards	124	219
Rushing yards	206	91
Penalties	2–6	7–59
Turnovers	1	3
Time of possession	28:47	31:13

Statistic	OSU	MICH
Passing	J. T. Barrett (124)	Wilton Speight (219)
Rushing	J. T. Barrett (125)	De'Veon Smith (60)
Receiving	Noah Brown (40)	Amara Darboh (68)

=== Vs. Florida State ===
Michigan vs. Florida State
(Orange Bowl)

Team	1	2	3	4	Total
#6 Wolverines	3	3	9	17	32
• #10 Seminoles	17	3	0	13	33

- Date: December 30
- Location: Hard Rock Stadium
  Miami Gardens, FL
- Game start: 8:11 EST
- Elapsed time: 3:42
- Game attendance: 67,432
- Referee: Matt Austin
- TV announcers (ESPN): Steve Levy, Brian Griese & Todd McShay

Scoring summary
1	12:47	FSU	Dalvin Cook 2-yard run (Roberto Aguayo kick)	FSU 7–0
1	9:11	MICH	Kenny Allen 19-yard field goal	FSU 7–3
1	7:31	FSU	Roberto Aguayo 42-yard field goal	FSU 10–3
1	2:49	FSU	Nyqwan Murray 92-yard pass from Deondre Francois (Roberto Aguayo kick)	FSU 17–3
2	9:36	MICH	Kenny Allen 28-yard field goal	FSU 17–6
2	4:49	FSU	Roberto Aguayo 38-yard field goal	FSU 20–6
3	7:34	MICH	Kenny Allen 37-yard field goal	FSU 20–9
3	0:54	MICH	Mike McCray 14-yard interception return (Wilton Speight pass failed)	FSU 20–15
4	11:38	FSU	Deondre Francois 3-yard run (Roberto Aguayo kick)	FSU 27–15
4	5:22	MICH	Khalid Hill 8-yard pass from Wilton Speight (Kenny Allen kick)	FSU 27–22
4	1:57	MICH	Chris Evans 30-yard run (Wilton Speight pass to Amara Darboh)	MICH 30–27
4	0:36	FSU	Nyqwan Murray 12-yard pass from Deondre Francois (Roberto Aguayo kick blocked)	FSU 33–30
4	0:36	MICH	Josh Metellus 98-yard defensive conversion	FSU 33–32

On December 4, Michigan was selected to play in the Orange Bowl against the Florida State Seminoles. Michigan lost the previous meeting in 1991, by a score of 51–31. This was Michigan's 45th bowl game appearance, and third appearance in the Orange Bowl.

Playing without Heisman Trophy finalist Jabrill Peppers, Michigan lost to Florida State, 33–32. Florida State opened the scoring in the first quarter via a two-yard touchdown run from Dalvin Cook. Michigan responded with a 19-yard field goal from Kenny Allen. Florida State extended its lead with a 42-yard field goal from Roberto Aguayo and a 92-yard touchdown pass from Deondre Francois to Nyqwan Murray. The teams exchanged field goals in the second quarter, a 28-yard field goal from Allen, and a 38-yard field goal from Roberto Aguayo, which made the score 20–6 in favor of Florida State at half-time. Michigan scored nine points in the third quarter on a 37-yard field goal from Allen, and a 14-yard interception return from Mike McCray, reducing Florida State's lead to five points. Florida State extended its lead in the fourth quarter via a three-yard run from Francois. Michigan responded with 15 unanswered points via an eight-yard touchdown pass from Wilton Speight to Khalid Hill, and a 30-yard touchdown run from Chris Evans to take their first lead of the game. Florida State responded with a 12-yard touchdown pass from Francois to Murray. Florida State's extra point was blocked by Chris Wormley, and Josh Metellus returned it the length of the field for a defensive conversion, making the score 33–32 in favor of the Seminoles. Michigan took over possession at its 25-yard line following the kickoff but was unable to get anything going as a fourth-down pass was intercepted near midfield to seal the game.

Michigan finished the season with 534 points scored, fifth all-time trailing only the 1901–1904 point-a-minute teams. In finishing three-for-three on the day in field goals, Kenny Allen was one shy of the program record for most consecutive field goals made (16). Allen finished his career at 37-for-45, an 82.2-percent clip, just short of passing Bob Bergeron (29-of-35; 82.9 percent) as Michigan's all-time most accurate field goal kicker (minimum of 15 attempts). He also closes his career a perfect 95-for-95 on point-after attempts, tied with 10 others atop the program charts. Wide receiver Amara Darboh finished his career with at least one catch in 33 straight games, the fourth-longest streak in program history. Jeremy Gallon owns the record at 39 consecutive games.

== 2017 NFL draft ==
Rnd.	Pick	Team	Player	Pos.	College	Notes
1	25	Cleveland Browns	Jabrill Peppers	S	Michigan	from Houston
1	28	Dallas Cowboys	Taco Charlton	DE	Michigan	
3	74	Baltimore Ravens	Chris Wormley	DT	Michigan	from Philadelphia
3	92	Dallas Cowboys	Jourdan Lewis	CB	Michigan	
3	95	Seattle Seahawks	Lano Hill	S	Michigan	from Atlanta
3*	106	Seattle Seahawks	Amara Darboh	WR	Michigan	
4	120	Minnesota Vikings	Ben Gedeon	LB	Michigan	
4*	138	Cincinnati Bengals	Ryan Glasgow	DT	Michigan	
4*	139	Kansas City Chiefs	Jehu Chesson	WR	Michigan	from Cleveland via Philadelphia and Minnesota
5	145	Denver Broncos	Jake Butt	TE	Michigan	from Cleveland
6	197	New York Jets	Jeremy Clark	CB	Michigan	from Arizona via Chicago and LA Rams

Michigan set a program record with 11 NFL Draft selections, surpassing the previous record of 10, which was set in 1972 and 1974. Nine of this year's selections came in the first four rounds, setting another program record. It was also the most draftees in the 2017 NFL Draft by any school.

== Roster ==
2016 Michigan Wolverines football team roster
Players
Coaches
Offense

Pos.	#	Name	Class
WR	1	Kekoa Crawford	Fr
TE	2	Devin Asiasi	Fr
QB	3	Wilton Speight	Jr
RB	4	De'Veon Smith	Sr
QB	6	Michael Sessa	Fr
RB	6	Kareem Walker	Fr
QB	7	Shane Morris	Sr
QB	8	John O'Korn	Sr
WR	9	Grant Perry	So
QB	10	Alex Malzone	So
RB	12	Chris Evans	Fr
WR	13	Eddie McDoom	Fr
WR	14	Drake Harris	Jr
QB	15	Garrett Moores	Sr
WR	16	Jack Wangler	Sr
WR	17	Simeon Smith	Fr
TE	17	Tyrone Wheatley Jr.	So
TE	18	Nick Eubanks	Fr
QB	18	Brandon Peters	Fr
FB	19	Henry Poggi	Sr
RB	20	Drake Johnson	RSr
RB	22	Karan Higdon	So
RB	23	Kingston Davis	Fr
WR	24	Jake Martin	Fr
WR	25	Nate Johnson	Fr
WR	25	Brendan White	So
RB	27	Joe Hewlett	Jr
WR	28	Austin Brenner	Jr
FB	30	Joe Beneducci	Jr
RB	32	Ty Isaac	Sr
TE	34	Kenneth Ferris	So
FB	35	Brian Chu	Jr
WR	35	Nate Schoenle	Fr
FB	37	Bobby Henderson	RSr
FB	39	Spencer Dickow	So
FB	40	Nick Volk	Jr
FB	41	Michael Hirsch	Jr
TE	42	Joseph Files	So
OG/DT	50	Michael Onwenu	Fr
OL	51	Greg Froelich	Sr
C	52	Mason Cole	Jr
G	55	David Dawson	Sr
OG/C	57	Patrick Kugler	Sr
C	63	Ben Pliska	RSr
OL	65	Anthony Kay	Fr
G	67	Kyle Kalis	RSr
OL	68	Andrew Vastardis	Fr
OT	70	Nolan Ulizio	So
G	71	Ben Braden	RSr
OL	72	Stephen Spanellis	Fr
G	74	Ben Bredeson	Fr
OT	75	Jon Runyan Jr.	So
OT	76	Juwann Bushell-Beatty	Jr
OT	77	Grant Newsome	So
OT	78	Erik Magnuson	RSr
OL	79	Greg Robinson	Fr
FB	80	Khalid Hill	Sr
TE	81	Michael Jocz	RSr
TE	81	Dan Jokisch	Fr
WR	82	Amara Darboh	RSr
TE	83	Zach Gentry	So
TE	84	Sean McKeon	Fr
WR	85	Maurice Ways	Jr
WR	86	Jehu Chesson	RSr
TE	86	Connor Edmonds	Fr
TE	88	Jake Butt (C)	Sr
TE	89	Ian Bunting	Jr

Defense

Pos.	#	Name	Class
LB	2	Carlo Kemp	Fr
DE	3	Rashan Gary	Fr
LB	4	Reuben Jones	So
Viper	5	Jabrill Peppers	Jr
CB	6	Keith Washington	So
S	7	Khaleke Hudson	Fr
DE	7	Shelton Johnson	So
CB	8	Channing Stribling	Sr
LB	9	Mike McCray	Sr
LB	10	Devin Bush Jr.	Fr
S	13	Josh Metellus	Fr
DE	15	Chase Winovich	Jr
DE	17	Ron Johnson	Fr
S	18	AJ Pearson	RSr
CB	20	Matt Mitchell	Jr
CB	22	David Long	Fr
S	23	Tyree Kinnel	So
CB	24	Lavert Hill	Fr
S	25	Dymonte Thomas	Sr
CB	26	Jourdan Lewis	Sr
S	27	Tru Wilson	Fr
CB	28	Brandon Watson	Jr
S	29	Jordan Glasgow	So
S	30	Tyler Cochran	Fr
DB	32	Louis Grodman	So
DE	33	Taco Charlton	Sr
CB	34	Jeremy Clark	RSr
LB	35	Josh Uche	Fr
LB	36	Devin Gil	Fr
DB	36	Taylor Krupp	So
DE	37	Dane Drobocky	Fr
LB	38	Jared Wangler	Jr
LB	40	Wyatt Shallman	Sr
CB	40	Kenneth Sloss	Sr
S	41	Jacob West	So
LB	42	Ben Gedeon	Sr
DE/DT	43	Chris Wormley (C)	RSr
S	44	Lano Hill	Sr
LB	46	Michael Wroblewski	Sr
S	49	Anthony Dalimonte	Sr
DT	50	Michael Dwumfour	Fr
LB	51	Peter Bush	Fr
LB	52	Elysee Mbem-Bosse	Fr
DT	53	Salim Makki	Jr
DT	54	Carl Myers	Fr
DT	55	Garrett Miller	Sr
LB	56	Jameson Offerdahl	So
LB	58	Alex Kaminski	Jr
LB	59	Noah Furbush	Jr
DT	73	Maurice Hurst Jr.	Sr
LB	88	Jack Dunaway	So
DT	90	Bryan Mone	Jr
LB	92	Cheyenn Robertson	So
DE	93	Lawrence Marshall	Jr
DT	96	Ryan Glasgow	RSr
DT	99	Matthew Godin	RSr

Special teams

Pos.	#	Name	Class
K	3	Quinn Nordin	Fr
P	17	Will Hart	Fr
K/P	31	James Foug	So
K/P	41	Ryan Tice	So
LS	31	Scott Sypniewski	Sr
LS	38	Camaron Cheeseman	Fr
LS	38	Bradley Deeg	So
LS	50	Andrew Robinson	Jr
K/P	91	Kenny Allen	RSr

Head coach

- Jim Harbaugh

Coordinators/assistant coaches

- Tim Drevno (offensive coordinator / offensive line)
- Don Brown (defensive coordinator)
- Jedd Fisch (passing game coordinator / quarterbacks / wide receivers)
- Chris Partridge (special teams coordinator / linebackers)
- Jay Harbaugh (tight ends)
- Greg Mattison (defensive line)
- Kevin Tolbert (strength and conditioning)
- Tyrone Wheatley (running backs)
- Mike Zordich (cornerbacks)
- Brian Smith (safeties)
- Biff Poggi (assistant to the head coach in charge of special projects)
- Tony Tuioti (Director of Player Personnel)
- Michael Switzer (Offensive Analyst)
- Jimmie Dougherty (Offensive Analyst)
- Devin Bush Sr. (Defensive Analyst)
- Bam Richards (Offensive Analyst and Recruiting Coordinator)
- Rick Finotti (Defensive Analyst)
- Zach Eisendrath (Director of Internal Communications and Operations)
- Sarah Snyder (Director of Performance Nutrition)
- Gwendolyn Bush (Director Of Player Development)
- Al Netter (Offensive Grad Assistant)
- Drew Terrell (Offensive Assistant/Wide Receivers)
- Antonio James (Defensive Assistant)
- Joe Hastings (Defensive Graduate Assistant)
- Albert Karschnia (Operations Assistant)
- Tony Binker (Recruiting Assistant)
- Elijah Sandweiss (Recruiting Assistant)
- Tony DeFeo (Director of Football Operations & Analytics)
- Erin Cronyn (Operations Intern)
- Katie Giarmo (Recruiting Intern)

Legend

- (C) Team captain
- (S) Suspended
- (I) Ineligible
- Injured
- Redshirt

Roster
Last update: September 10, 2016

== Awards and honors ==
Weekly Awards
Player	Award	Date Awarded	Ref.
Mike McCray	Big Ten Defensive Player of the Week	September 5, 2016	
Wilton Speight	Big Ten Offensive Player of the Week	September 12, 2016	
Jabrill Peppers	Co-Big Ten Defensive Player of the Week; Big Ten Special Teams Player of the Week; Walter Camp FBS Player of the Week	September 19, 2016	
Kenny Allen	Big Ten Special Teams Player of the Week	October 31, 2016	
Wilton Speight	Co-Big Ten Offensive Player of the Week	November 7, 2016	
De'Veon Smith	Co-Big Ten Offensive Player of the Week	November 21, 2016	

Individual Awards
Player	Award	Ref.
Jabrill Peppers	Nagurski-Woodson Defensive Player of the Year; Butkus-Fitzgerald Linebacker of the Year; Rodgers-Dwight Return Specialist of the Year; Paul Hornung Award; Lott Trophy	
Jourdan Lewis	Tatum-Woodson Defensive Back of the Year	
Jake Butt	Kwalick-Clark Tight End of the Year; John Mackey Award; Senior CLASS Award	
Garrett Moores	Peter Mortell Award	

All-American
Player	AP	AFCA	FWAA	TSN	WCFF	ESPN	CBS	Fox	SI.com	USAT	Designation
Jabrill Peppers	1	1	1	1	1	1	1	1	1	1	Unanimous
Jourdan Lewis	1	1	2	1	1	1	1	2	1		Consensus
Jake Butt	2	1		2	1				2		Consensus
Chris Wormley				2							None
Kyle Kalis		2									None
The NCAA recognizes a selection to all five of the AP, AFCA, FWAA, TSN and WCFF first teams for unanimous selections and three of five for consensus selections.

All-Big Ten
Player	Position	Coaches	Media
Erik Magnuson	OT	1	1
Jake Butt	TE	1	1
Taco Charlton	DL	1	1
Jabrill Peppers	LB	1	1
Jourdan Lewis	DB	1	1
Jabrill Peppers	PR	1	1
Chris Wormley	DL	1	2
Amara Darboh	WR	2	2
Mason Cole	C	2	2
Kyle Kalis	OG	2	2
Ben Braden	OT	2	2
Ryan Glasgow	DL	2	2
Channing Stribling	DB	2	2
Kenny Allen	P	2	2
Ben Gedeon	LB	3	2
Lano Hill	DB	2	Hon.
Wilton Speight	QB	3	3
Kenny Allen	K	Hon.	Hon.
Ben Bredeson	OG	Hon.	Hon.
Mike McCray	LB	Hon.	Hon.
De'Veon Smith	RB	Hon.	Hon.
Dymonte Thomas	DB	Hon.	Hon.
Matt Godin	DL	Hon.	–
Jehu Chesson	WR	–	Hon.
Hon. = Honorable mention. Reference:
