= Ben Gedeon =

American football player (born 1994)

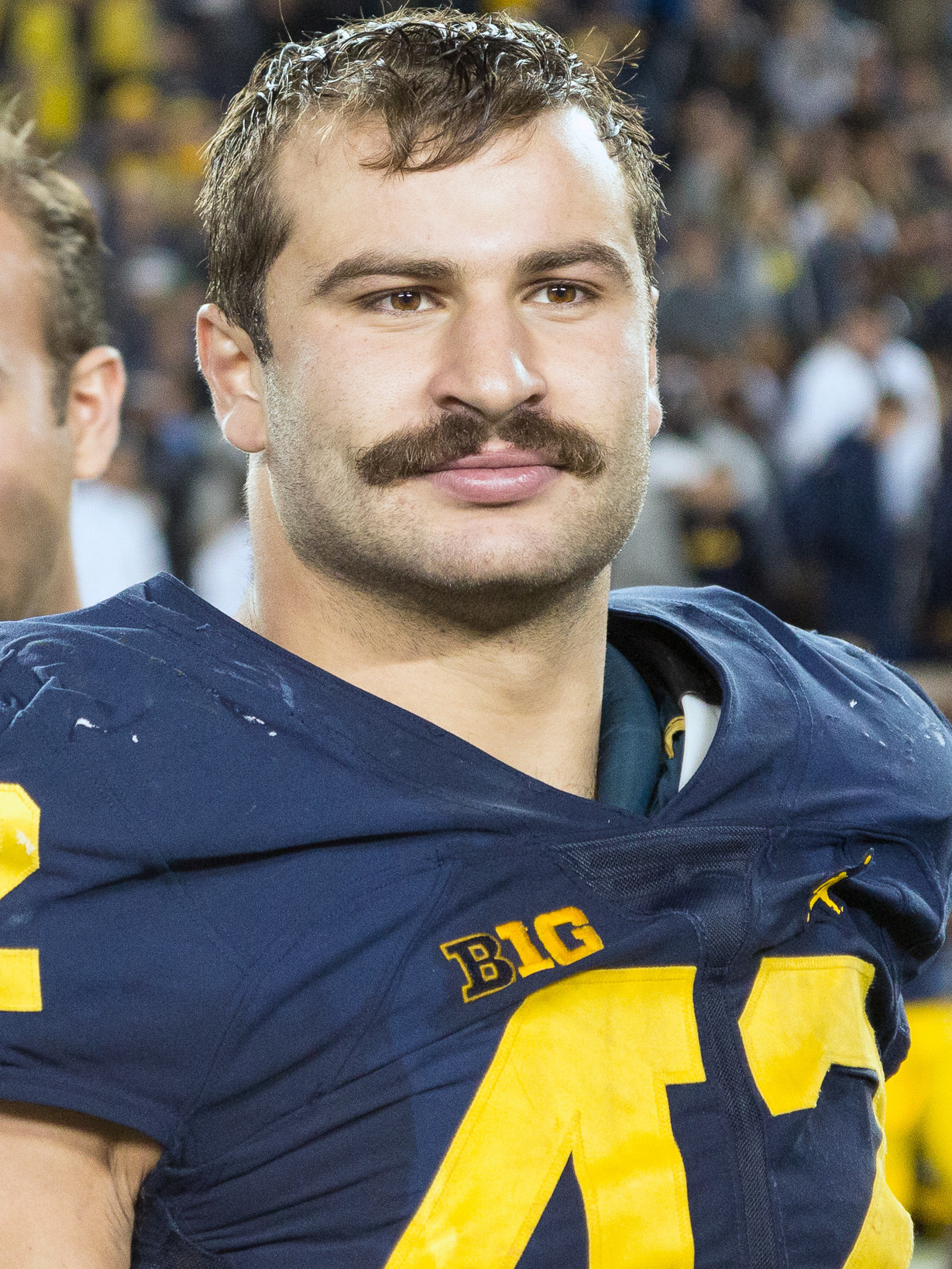
- Gedeon with the Michigan Wolverines in 2016

No. 42
- Position: Linebacker

Personal information
- Born: October 16, 1994 (age 32); Hudson, Ohio, U.S.
- Listed height: 6 ft 2 in (1.88 m)
- Listed weight: 244 lb (111 kg)

Career information
- High school: Hudson
- College: Michigan (2013–2016)
- NFL draft: 2017: 4th round, 120th overall pick

Career history
- Minnesota Vikings (2017–2020)

Awards and highlights
- Second-team All-Big Ten (2016)

Career NFL statistics
- Total tackles: 103
- Stats at Pro Football Reference

Benjamin Gedeon (born October 16, 1994) is an American former professional football player who was a linebacker in the National Football League (NFL). He played college football for the Michigan Wolverines and was selected by the Minnesota Vikings in the fourth round of the 2017 NFL draft. He played for the Vikings for four seasons, with his last season being in 2020.

== College career ==
Gedeon appeared in 51 games and made 14 starting assignments at linebacker, ultimately recording 176 tackles, 6.5 sacks, 21 tackles-for-loss and two pass breakups. As a senior, he posted a career best 106 tackles, 15.5 tackles-for-loss, 4.5 sacks and two pass breakups. Following the 2016 season, Gedeon was named to the All-Big Ten Conference defensive second-team by the media.

== Professional career ==
=== Pre-draft ===
Gedeon was ranked as the No. 9 inside linebacker in the 2017 NFL draft by CBSSports.com and was projected to go in the fourth or fifth round according to NFL.com. Gedeon was one of the top performers at the 2017 NFL Combine. Gedeon finished atop all linebackers in the bench press, lifting 225 pounds 27 times. He also tied for the best 20-yard shuttle (4.13 seconds), was third in the 60-yard shuttle (11.58 seconds), had the seventh-best vertical jump (34.5 inches), was ninth in the 3-cone drill (6.98 seconds) and was twelfth with a 119-inch broad jump.

External videos
- Gedeon performing at the 2017 NFL Combine

Pre-draft measurables
Height	Weight	Arm length	Hand span	Wingspan	40-yard dash	10-yard split	20-yard split	20-yard shuttle	Three-cone drill	Vertical jump	Broad jump	Bench press
6 ft 1 3/4 in (1.87 m)	244 lb (111 kg)	32 5/8 in (0.83 m)	10 in (0.25 m)	6 ft 5 1/2 in (1.97 m)	4.75 s	1.59 s	2.77 s	4.13 s	6.98 s	34.5 in (0.88 m)	9 ft 11 in (3.02 m)	27 reps
All values from NFL Combine

=== 2017 ===
The Minnesota Vikings selected Gedeon in fourth round (120th overall) of the 2017 NFL draft. He was the first of two linebackers drafted by the Vikings in 2017, along with Elijah Lee. On May 26, 2017, the Vikings signed a Gedeon to a four-year, $3.03 million contract that includes a signing bonus of $633,147.

External videos
- Gedeon gets drafted by the Vikings

Throughout training camp, Gedeon competed against Emmanuel Lamur, Edmond Robinson, Elijah Lee, and Kentrell Brothers for the job as the starting weakside linebacker after it was left vacant due to the retirement of Chad Greenway. Head coach Mike Zimmer named Gedeon the starting weakside linebacker, along with Anthony Barr and middle linebacker Eric Kendricks.

He made his regular season debut and first career start in the Vikings' season-opener against the New Orleans Saints and recorded a solo tackle during their 29–19 victory. On December 31, 2017, Gedeon collected a season-high six combined tackles in the Vikings' 23–10 win against the Chicago Bears. Gedeon finished his rookie season with 37 combined tackles (23 solo) in 16 games and nine starts.

The Minnesota Vikings finished first in the NFC North with a 13–3 record and received a first round bye. On January 14, 2018, Gedeon played in first career playoff game and assisted on one tackle in a 29–24 victory against the Saints in the NFC Divisional round. They lost to the Philadelphia Eagles who became the eventual Super Bowl LII Champions.

=== 2018 ===
Gedeon entered training camp slated as the starting weakside linebacker. Head coach Mike Zimmer named Gedeon and Anthony Barr the starting outside linebackers. They started alongside middle linebacker Kendricks. In Week 14, he collected a season-high nine combined tackles during a 21–7 loss at the Seattle Seahawks. He finished the season with 53 combined tackles (29 solo) and two pass deflections in 15 games and eight starts.

=== 2019 ===
Gedeon opened the 2019 season as a starting linebacker for the Vikings. He played in eight games with five starts before suffering a concussion in Week 11. He was placed on injured reserve on December 2, 2019.

=== 2020 ===
Gedeon was placed on the active/physically unable to perform list (PUP) at the start of training camp on August 3, 2020. He was moved to the reserve/PUP list to start the regular season on September 5. He was waived with a failed physical designation on November 10, 2020.

== Career statistics ==
=== NFL ===
Year	Team	Games		Tackles				Interceptions						Fumbles	
Year	Team	GP	GS	Comb	Total	Ast	Sck	PDef	Int	Yds	Avg	Lng	TDs	FF	FR
2017	MIN	16	9	37	23	14	0.0	0	0	0	0.0	0	0	0	0
2018	MIN	15	8	53	29	24	0.0	2	0	0	0.0	0	0	0	0
2019	MIN	8	5	13	8	5	0.0	0	0	0	0.0	0	0	0	0
Total		39	22	103	60	43	0.0	2	0	0	0.0	0	0	0	0

=== College ===
Year	Team	Tackles					Interceptions						Fumbles			
Year	Team	Total	Solo	Ast	Sck	Tfl	PDef	Int	Yards	Avg	Lng	TDs	FF	FR	FR Yds	TDs
2013	Michigan	19	9	10	1.0	1.0	0	0	0	0.0	0	0	0	0	0	0
2014	Michigan	17	12	5	1.0	1.5	0	0	0	0.0	0	0	0	0	0	0
2015	Michigan	34	21	13	0.0	3.0	0	0	0	0.0	0	0	0	0	0	0
2016	Michigan	94	39	55	4.5	15.0	2	0	0	0.0	0	0	0	0	0	0
Career		164	81	83	6.5	20.5	2	0	0	0.0	0	0	0	0	0	0
