= Tedric Thompson =

American football player (born 1995)

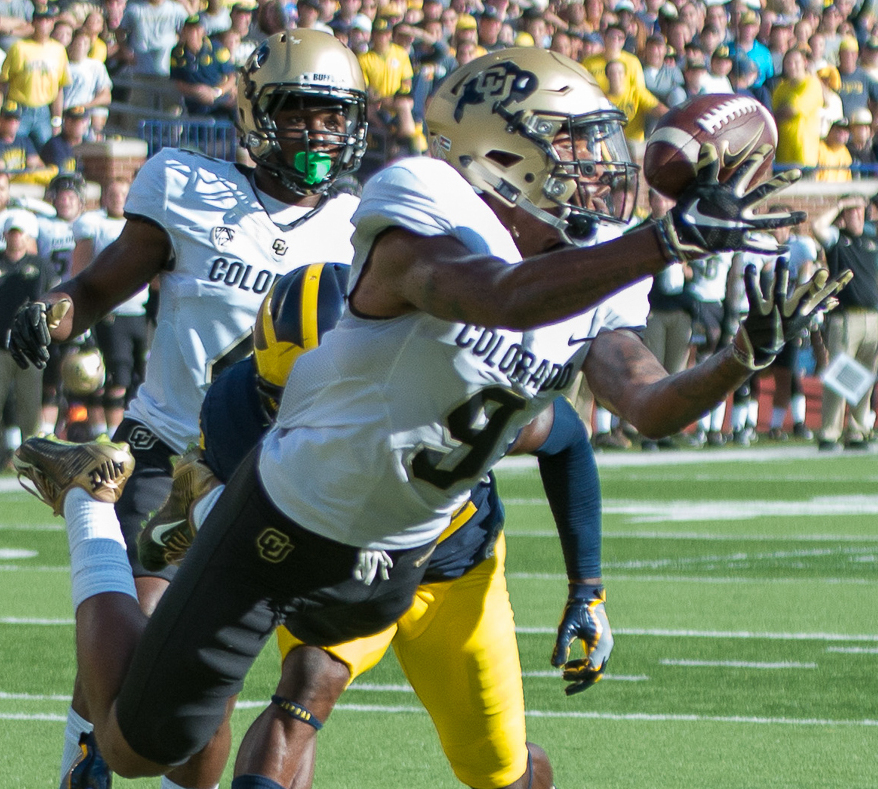
- Thompson with the Colorado Buffaloes in 2016

No. 33, 24, 37
- Position: Safety

Personal information
- Born: January 20, 1995 (age 31); Inglewood, California, U.S.
- Listed height: 6 ft 0 in (1.83 m)
- Listed weight: 204 lb (93 kg)

Career information
- High school: Valencia (Santa Clarita, California)
- College: Colorado
- NFL draft: 2017: 4th round, 111th overall pick

Career history
- Seattle Seahawks (2017–2019); Kansas City Chiefs (2020); Cleveland Browns (2020); Denver Broncos (2021)*; Tennessee Titans (2021)*; Cleveland Browns (2021)
- * Offseason or practice squad member only

Awards and highlights
- Second-team All-Pac-12 (2016)

Career NFL statistics
- Total tackles: 93
- Forced fumbles: 1
- Fumble recoveries: 2
- Interceptions: 3
- Pass deflections: 5
- Stats at Pro Football Reference

Tedric Thompson (born January 20, 1995) is an American former professional football player who was a safety in the National Football League (NFL). He played college football for the Colorado Buffaloes, and was selected in the fourth round of the 2017 NFL draft by the Seattle Seahawks.

== Professional career ==
External videos
- Thompson's NFL combine workout

Pre-draft measurables
Height	Weight	Arm length	Hand span	40-yard dash	10-yard split	20-yard split	20-yard shuttle	Three-cone drill	Vertical jump	Broad jump	Bench press
6 ft 0 in (1.83 m)	204 lb (93 kg)	31 1/2 in (0.80 m)	9 5/8 in (0.24 m)	4.60 s	1.53 s	2.68 s	4.36 s	7.11 s	35.5 in (0.90 m)	9 ft 9 in (2.97 m)	17 reps
All values are from NFL Combine/Pro Day

=== Seattle Seahawks ===
The Seattle Seahawks selected Thompson in the fourth round with the 111th overall pick in the 2017 NFL draft. He was the 12th safety selected in 2017 and was one of three safeties drafted by the Seahawks that year. Thompson was the second safety selected by the Seahawks behind Michigan's Lano Hill, but was selected before Cincinnati's Mike Tyson. On May 11, 2017, the Seahawks signed Thompson to a four-year, $3.07 million contract that includes a signing bonus of $672,004.

External videos
- Seahawks select Thompson 111th overall

Throughout training camp, Thompson competed against Bradley McDougald to be the primary backup free safety. Head coach Pete Carroll named Thompson the third free safety on the Seahawks’ depth chart to begin the regular season, behind Earl Thomas and McDougald.

Thompson was inactive as a healthy scratch for the Seahawks’ first seven games (Weeks 1–8). On November 5, 2017, Thompson made his professional regular season debut and made one tackle during their 17–14 loss against the Washington Redskins in Week 9. He finished his rookie season in 2017 with four combined tackles (two solo) in nine games and zero starts.

In Week 5 of the 2019 season against the Los Angeles Rams, Thompson intercepted a pass from Jared Goff that was dropped by Gerald Everett in the 30–29 win. In Week 6 against the Cleveland Browns, Thompson intercepted a pass thrown by Baker Mayfield in the 32–28 win.

On October 30, 2019, he was placed on injured reserve with a shoulder injury.

Thompson was released by the Seahawks on March 31, 2020.

=== Kansas City Chiefs ===
Thompson was signed by the Kansas City Chiefs on July 30, 2020. He was waived by the Chiefs on November 28.

=== Cleveland Browns (first stint) ===
Thompson was claimed off waivers by the Browns on November 30, 2020. He was waived by the Browns on January 15, 2021.

=== Denver Broncos ===
On July 27, 2021, Thompson signed with the Denver Broncos. On August 8, the Broncos released Thompson.

=== Tennessee Titans ===
On August 12, 2021, Thompson signed with the Tennessee Titans. He was placed on injured reserve on August 17. Thompson was released by the Titans on August 20.

=== Cleveland Browns (second stint) ===
On December 16, 2021, Thompson was signed to the Cleveland Browns' practice squad. Thompson was elevated to the active roster for the team's December 20 game against the Las Vegas Raiders.

== Personal life ==
He is the younger brother of former safety Cedric Thompson.
