= Mike McCray =

American football player (born 1994)

Mike McCray II
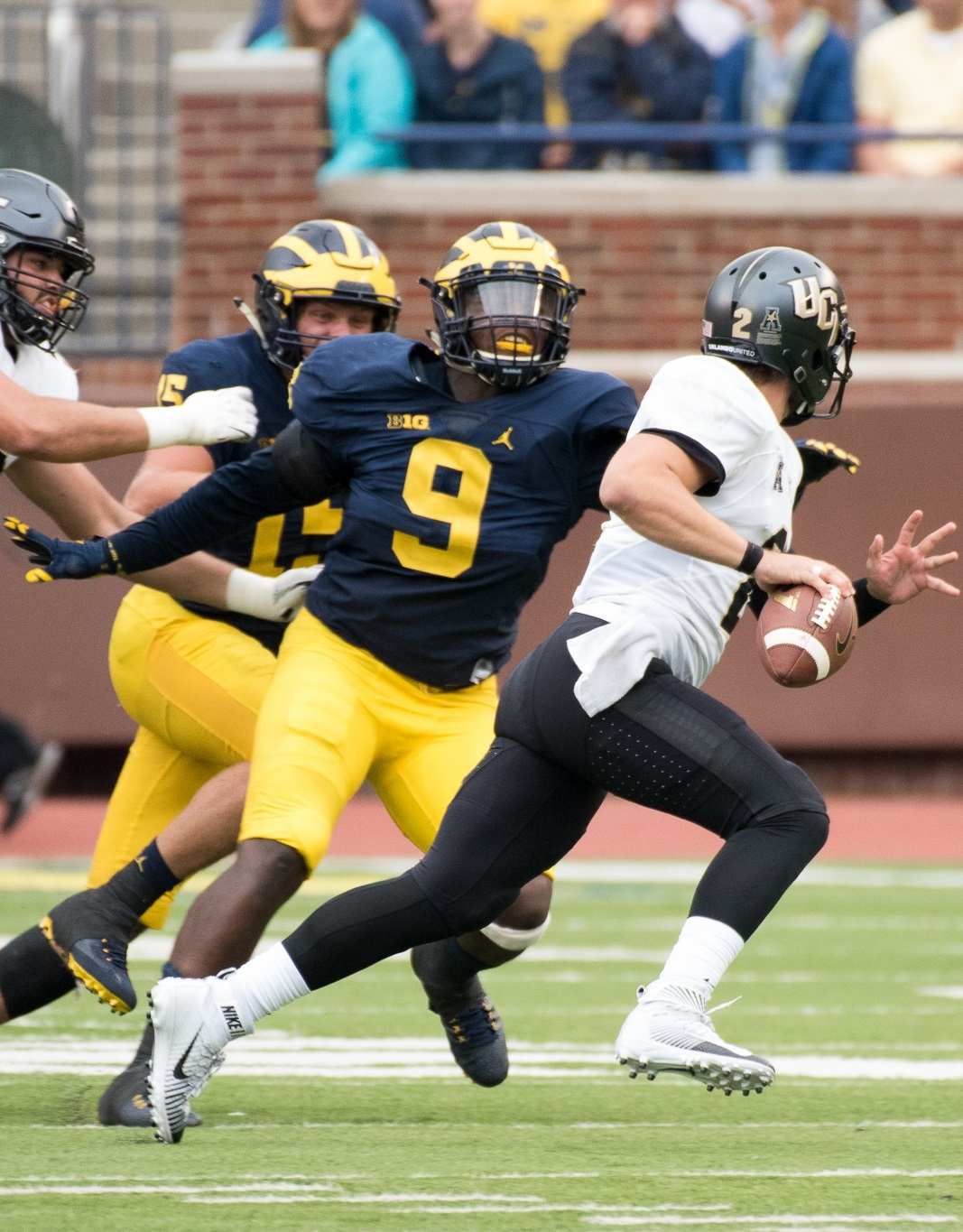

Central State Marauders
- Title: Linebackers coach

Personal information
- Born: August 3, 1994 (age 32); Dayton, Ohio, U.S.

Career information
- High school: Trotwood-Madison (Trotwood, OH)
- College: Michigan
- NFL draft: 2018: undrafted

Career history
- Michigan (2016) Recruiting coordinator; Michigan (2018) Intern; Michigan (2019–2020) Defensive analyst; Notre Dame (2021) Graduate assistant; UMass (2022–2024) Outside linebackers coach; Central State Marauders (2025-present) Linebackers Coach

Michael Juey McCray II (born August 3, 1994) is an American college football coach and former professional linebacker. He is the Run Game Coordinator/LBs coach for the Central State University, a position he has held since 2025.

== Early life ==
When McCray was young, he played basketball and baseball. He first played organized football in sixth grade. After two years of football, he went back to basketball and baseball before resuming football in high school. Dubbed "Big Play McCray", he played football at Trotwood-Madison High School for coach Maurice Douglass. As a junior in 2011, he gained 460 yards on 28 catches and nine touchdowns and totaled 86 tackles with five interceptions and three defensive touchdowns. As a senior in 2012, he caught 19 passes for 369 yards and four scores and made a total of 121 tackles with 2.5 sacks, three forced fumbles and two interceptions. He was recognized as an Associated Press (AP) Division II All-Ohio first-team and AP Division II Ohio Defensive Player of the Year selection in 2012. Although he was expected by some to follow his father to Ohio State, he attended the first night game at Michigan Stadium on September 10, 2011 wearing a Michigan hat. McCray was part of a team that included several highly touted recruits. McCray became a news subject when he committed to Michigan in March 2012 and was the subject of a tweet by then-current Michigan football player Roy Roundtree (a Trotwood alum) prior to signing, which was a minor NCAA violation. Toward the end of his 2011–12 junior year, he was rumored to have an offer from Ohio State. Ohio State never did offer McCray. McCray was a selection for the January 4, 2013 Under Armour All-American Game, but was unable to participate in the game while he was recovering from surgery on his left labrum. After leading Trotwood to a 15–0 Ohio High School Athletic Association Division II championship 2011 season, he committed to Michigan on March 6, 2012 over offers that included Oklahoma, Tennessee, Illinois, and Purdue.

== College career ==
At Michigan, he saw no gametime action for either the 2013 or 2015 Wolverines. He played in 11 games for the 2014 team, accumulating two tackles (one for a loss) and one blocked punt. As a redshirt freshman, he blocked a punt that was returned for a touchdown in his first game on opening day against Appalachian State. That season he played under defensive coordinator Greg Mattison and head coach Brady Hoke. Following his redshirt season for the 2014 Wolverines, he endured a shoulder injury that led to surgery before the 2015 spring game. McCray had to have a second surgery before the 2015 season and was considering transferring. That season Jim Harbaugh became coach and brought in D. J. Durkin as defensive coordinator. He missed the entire 2015 season due to assorted injuries, including shoulder issues. He was a standout in the 2016 Spring game.

Following the 2015 season, Michigan lost all three of its starting linebackers to graduation. The team hired Don Brown as its defensive coordinator. In his first career start for the 2016 Wolverines, McCray tackled Diocemy Saint Juste for a loss during the first series of the game against Hawaii. He ended up totaling 9 tackles (including 3.5 for a loss and 2 sacks), earning Big Ten Conference Defensive Player of the Week in his first start. That season, he and Jourdan Lewis raised their fists during the national anthem to help raise social consciousness. Following the season, McCray was an honorable mention All-Big Ten defensive selection by both the coaches and the media for the 2016 Michigan Wolverines football team. McCray completed his undergraduate studies and pursued graduate studies the following year.

The next year, as a fifth-year senior, he was named co-captain (along with Mason Cole) for the 2017 Wolverines, following in his father's footsteps (McCray Sr. was a fifth-year senior co-captain for the 1988 Ohio State Buckeyes football team). He did not start in the season opener against Florida, but did play although he appeared to be dealing with an injury. Following the season McCray, earned 2017 All-Big Ten team honorable mention recognition from the coaches and the media.

== Professional career ==
Pre-draft measurables
Height	Weight	Arm length	Hand span	Wingspan	40-yard dash	10-yard split	20-yard split	20-yard shuttle	Three-cone drill	Vertical jump	Broad jump	Bench press
6 ft 1 1/8 in (1.86 m)	243 lb (110 kg)	32 5/8 in (0.83 m)	9 1/8 in (0.23 m)	6 ft 6 1/2 in (1.99 m)	4.76 s	1.60 s	2.75 s	4.25 s	7.09 s	31.5 in (0.80 m)	9 ft 11 in (3.02 m)	16 reps
All values from NFL Combine

McCray signed with the Miami Dolphins as an undrafted free agent on May 10, 2018. On July 24, 2018, McCray announced his retirement from the NFL just two days before the start of training camp.

== Coaching career ==
It was announced that McCray has been promoted to a Defensive Analyst for the Michigan Wolverines for the 2019 season, while McCray was an intern during the 2018 season after retiring from football. He was hired by Notre Dame Fighting as graduate assistant for the 2020 season. In 2021 season, UMass Minutemen football hired McCray as outside linebackers coach along Don Brown who was coaching for Michigan Wolverines while McCray was playing for Michigan Wolverines.
