= Kareem Walker =

American football player (born 1998)

Profile
- Position: Running back

Personal information
- Born: May 18, 1998 (age 28); Irvington, New Jersey, U.S.
- Listed height: 6 ft 2 in (1.88 m)
- Listed weight: 225 lb (102 kg)

Career information
- High school: DePaul (NJ) Catholic
- College: Michigan (2016–2017); Fort Scott CC (2018); Mississippi State (2019–2020); South Alabama (2021)
- NFL draft: 2022: undrafted

Career history
- St. Louis BattleHawks (2023)

Kareem Walker (born May 18, 1998) is an American former football running back. He attended the University of Michigan on a scholarship to play college football for the Michigan Wolverines football team starting during the 2016 season, but left the team in 2018. Walker played as a true freshman at Michigan, then took a redshirt year before transferring to Fort Scott Community College in Kansas in 2018. He played for Mississippi State from 2019 to 2020 and South Alabama in 2021.

== Early life ==
Walker played high school football at DePaul Catholic High School in Wayne, New Jersey. He gained 4,563 rushing yards and scored 57 touchdowns during his high school career, including 1,607 yards and 27 touchdowns as a junior in 2014 and 1,517 yards and 14 touchdowns as a senior in 2015. In July 2014, he was rated by ESPN and 247Sports.com as the No. 1 running back in the class of 2016. He was rated as a four-star prospect by ESPN.com and the No. 45 overall player in the 2016 ESPN 300.

== College career ==
Walker originally committed to Ohio State, during halftime of the 2015 National Championship Game, but withdrew his commitment in November 2015. The following month, he committed to the University of Michigan. Walker enrolled early in January 2016, announced his intention to play as a freshman and added: "But I'm not riding the bench. I came in to be ready." In July 2018, Walker transferred to play at Fort Scott Community College in Kansas. Walker played for Mississippi State from 2019 to 2020 and South Alabama in 2021.

== Professional career ==
Walker was assigned to the St. Louis BattleHawks of the XFL on January 6, 2023. He was released on August 16, 2023.
