= Brian Smith (defensive back, born 1979) =

American football player and coach (born 1979)

Current position
- Title: Defensive coordinator & safeties coach
- Team: Temple
- Conference: AAC

Biographical details
- Born: July 15, 1979 (age 47); Wilmington, Delaware, U.S.
- Education: University of Massachusetts Amherst

Playing career
- 1997–2000: UMass
- Position: Defensive back

Coaching career (HC unless noted)
- 2004: UMass (OLB)
- 2005–2006: UMass (WR)
- 2007–2008: New York Jets (OQC)
- 2009–2012: New York Jets (DQC)
- 2013–2014: New York Jets (Asst. DB)
- 2015: Philadelphia Eagles (Asst. LB)
- 2016–2017: Michigan (DB)
- 2018–2020: Rice (DC/S)
- 2021–2022: Rice (DC/LB)
- 2023–2024: Rice (DC/S)
- 2025–present: Temple (DC/S)

Brian Smith (born July 15, 1979) is an American football coach and former player. He currently serves as the defensive coordinator and safeties coach for Temple University. Smith's coaching career spans collegiate football programs and the NFL, including positions with the University of Massachusetts Amherst, the University of Michigan, and Rice University, and professional teams such as the New York Jets and the Philadelphia Eagles.

== Playing career ==
Smith played collegiate football as a UMass Minuteman, where he was a defensive back. He earned four varsity letters and was a three-year starter, playing as a strong safety and cornerback. In his senior year, he served as team captain and earned multiple honors, including All-Atlantic 10, All-New England, and All-ECAC recognition. Academically, Smith earned conference honors three times. He was also a key player on the UMass' 1998 team that won the NCAA Division I-AA National Championship.

== Coaching career ==
=== UMass Amherst ===
Smith began his coaching career at his alma mater, UMass Amherst, as the outside linebackers coach in 2004. For the next two seasons, he was the Minutemen wide receivers coach. Among the players he coached was Victor Cruz, who later became an NFL Pro Bowler and All-Pro receiver.

=== New York Jets ===
Before the 2007 season, Smith began his eight-year tenure with the New York Jets of the NFL. In his first two seasons, Smith served as an offensive quality control coach on Eric Mangini's staff. In 2009, Smith was retained by newly hired head coach Rex Ryan and was moved to the defensive side of the ball as a defensive quality control coach. He worked with the Jets defensive backs for six seasons and was promoted to assistant defensive backs coach for the 2014 and 2015 seasons. During this time, cornerback Dee Milliner won NFL Defensive Rookie of the Month honors.

=== Philadelphia Eagles ===
In 2015, following Ryan's firing with the Jets, Smith joined Chip Kelly's Philadelphia Eagles staff as the assistant linebackers coach. Kelly was fired with two games left in the season, which led Smith to move again.

=== Michigan ===
In 2016, Smith joined Jim Harbaugh's Michigan staff as the safeties coach, reuniting him with Don Brown, who had recently been hired as the Wolverines defensive coordinator. Smith played under Brown when he was UMass’ defensive coordinator and later coached under him when Brown became head coach.

In Smith's first season, Michigan's starting safeties, Lano Hill and Dymonte Thomas, were named to the All-Big Ten honors. The defense ranked among the top two in the NCAA in seven statistical categories, including pass defense, pass efficiency defense, first and third down conversions allowed, and scoring defense. Michigan's defensive backs recorded 68 pass breakups, 13 interceptions, and three defensive touchdowns, including one by Hill. The unit allowed 11 passing touchdowns over the season.

=== Rice ===
In early December 2017, it was reported that Smith was leaving Michigan to become the defensive coordinator of Mike Bloomgren's inaugural Rice Owls football staff. The two had previously worked together for four seasons with the Jets, and Smith stated that he had wanted to be a coordinator on Bloomgren's staff when the opportunity arose.

Smith initially coached the Owls' safeties while serving as defensive coordinator for two seasons. From 2020 to 2022, he coached the linebackers before returning to coach the safeties. During Smith's tenure at Rice, three defensive players were named team MVPs: linebacker Blaze Alldredge in 2019 and 2020, and defensive tackle Elijah Garcia in 2021, who had one of the most statistically productive seasons for an interior defender at Rice since 1986. Following the 2024 season, Bloomgren was fired and Scott Abell was hired as the new head coach. Smith was originally retained by Abell before deciding to take the defensive coordinator job for new Temple head coach K. C. Keeler.

=== Temple ===
Smith was named as the new defensive coordinator at Temple in late 2024.

== Personal life ==
Originally from Wilmington, Delaware, Smith graduated cum laude from UMass Amherst with a degree in accounting.
