= Amara Darboh =

Sierra Leonean-born American football player (born 1994)

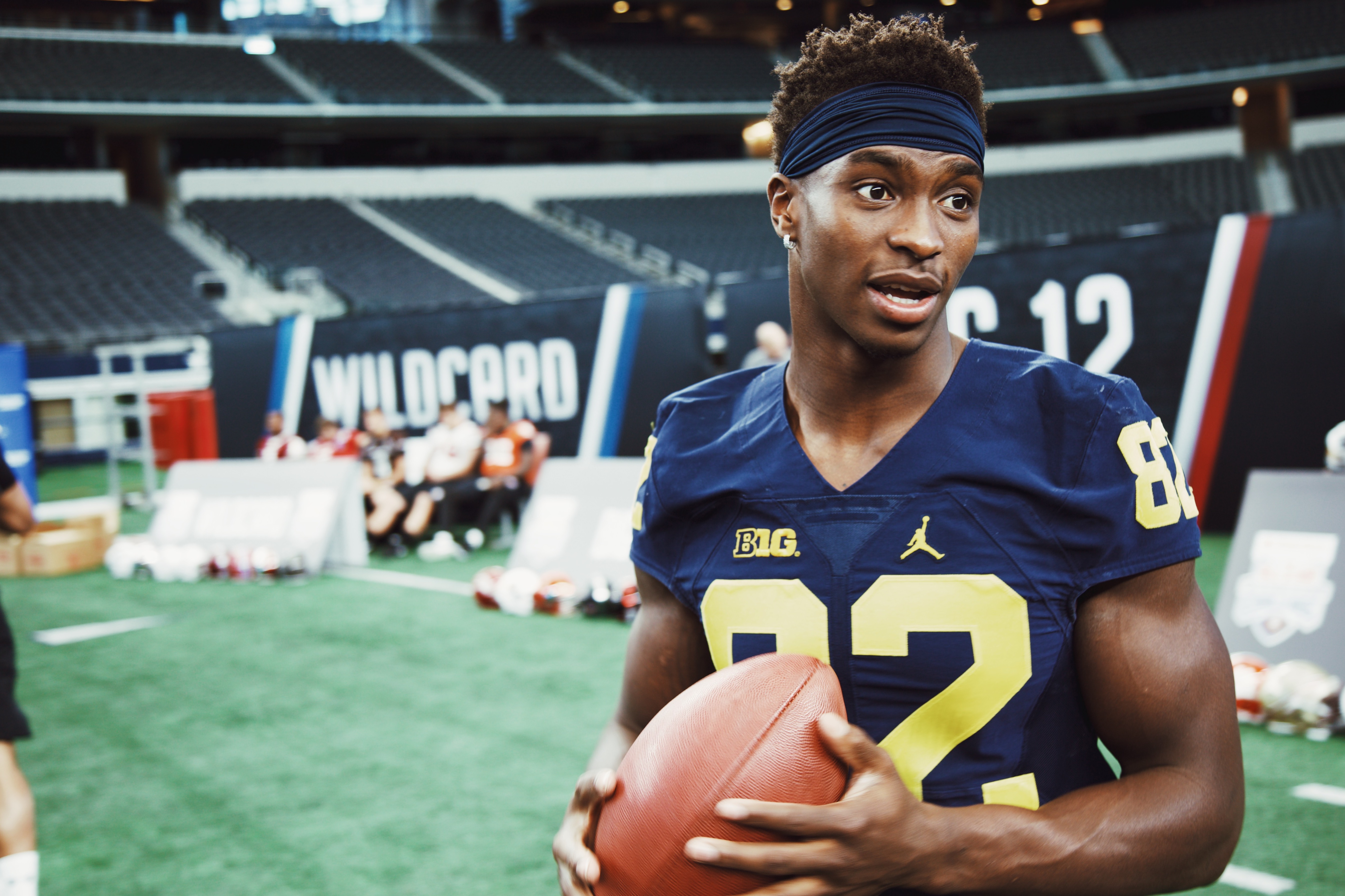
- Darboh with Michigan in 2017

No. 84
- Position: Wide receiver

Personal information
- Born: February 1, 1994 (age 32); Freetown, Sierra Leone
- Listed height: 6 ft 2 in (1.88 m)
- Listed weight: 215 lb (98 kg)

Career information
- High school: Dowling Catholic (West Des Moines, Iowa, U.S.)
- College: Michigan
- NFL draft: 2017: 3rd round, 106th overall pick

Career history
- Seattle Seahawks (2017); New England Patriots (2018)*; Seattle Seahawks (2018); Tampa Bay Buccaneers (2019); Pittsburgh Steelers (2019–2020); Carolina Panthers (2020–2021)*; Denver Broncos (2021)*
- * Offseason or practice squad member only

Awards and highlights
- Second-team All-Big Ten (2016)

Career NFL statistics
- Receptions: 8
- Receiving yards: 71
- Stats at Pro Football Reference

Amara Darboh (born February 1, 1994) is a Sierra Leonean-born former American football wide receiver. He was selected by the Seattle Seahawks in the third round of the 2017 NFL draft. He played college football for the Michigan Wolverines. A native of Sierra Leone, Darboh was orphaned during the Sierra Leone Civil War and moved to Iowa at age seven. He enrolled at the University of Michigan and was the Wolverines' leading receiver with 58 catches in 2016.

== Early life ==
Darboh was born in Sierra Leone, Africa, in 1994. At the age of two, Darboh's parents were killed, and he left the family's home in Freetown with his siblings to escape the violent Sierra Leone Civil War that left over 50,000 dead. The family lived for a time in Gambia and Senegal. The family settled in Iowa when Darboh was seven years old. Darboh was taken in by the Schaefer family in Des Moines and attended Holy Trinity Catholic School and would go on to play high school football at Dowling Catholic High School in West Des Moines, Iowa.

== College career ==
Darboh enrolled at the University of Michigan and has played college football for the Michigan Wolverines starting in 2012. As a true freshman in 2012, he appeared in four games as a backup at wide receiver and 11 games on special teams. He then missed the 2013 season due to a foot injury sustained prior to the start of the season.

Darboh saw his first significant playing time as a redshirt sophomore in 2014. He appeared in 12 games, eight of them as a starter at wide receiver. His best game of the season was against Indiana on November 1, as he had nine receptions for 107 yards and a touchdown. Over the course of the entire 2014 season, Darboh was Michigan's second leading receiver (trailing only Devin Funchess) with 36 receptions for 473 yards and two touchdowns.

As a redshirt junior in 2015, Darboh appeared in 13 games, including nine as a starter at wide receiver. In the season opener against Utah, Darboh had eight receptions for 101 yards and a touchdown. Darboh also became a United States citizen in September 2016. Against Indiana on November 14, he had eight catches for 109 yards and a touchdown. Over the course of the season, he led the Wolverines with 58 receptions, and his 727 receiving yards and five receiving touchdowns ranked second among the Michigan receivers, trailing only Jehu Chesson.

In August 2016, prior to the start of the 2016 season, head coach Jim Harbaugh said of Darboh, "I would say he's our top receiver right now." On September 10, 2016, Darboh caught five passes for 111 yards and two touchdowns, including a 45-yard touchdown pass from Wilton Speight in the first quarter. On October 29, 2016, he had the best game of his college career, catching eight passes for 165 yards. Through the first eight games of the 2016 season, Darboh was the leading Michigan receiver with 38 catches for 664 yards and five touchdowns. During the 2016 season, Darboh was the team's leading receiver with 52 receptions for 826 yards and seven touchdowns. Boasting two 100-yard receiving performances, Darboh ranks fourth in reception yards per game in the Big Ten, averaging 68.8 yards. Following the 2016 season, Darboh was named to the All-Big Ten Conference offensive second-team.

== Professional career ==
Pre-draft measurables
Height	Weight	Arm length	Hand span	40-yard dash	10-yard split	20-yard split	20-yard shuttle	Three-cone drill	Vertical jump	Broad jump	Bench press
6 ft 1 5/8 in (1.87 m)	214 lb (97 kg)	32 5/8 in (0.83 m)	9 7/8 in (0.25 m)	4.45 s	1.52 s	2.58 s	4.30 s	6.81 s	36.5 in (0.93 m)	10 ft 4 in (3.15 m)	17 reps
All values from NFL Combine and Pro Day

=== Seattle Seahawks (first stint) ===
Darboh was drafted by the Seattle Seahawks in the third round, 106th overall, in the 2017 NFL draft. On May 23, 2017, Darboh signed a four-year deal worth $3.175 million overall with a $706,288 signing bonus. On September 10, 2017, Darboh made his NFL debut in a 17–9 loss to the Green Bay Packers. In Week 2, against the San Francisco 49ers, he had his first career reception, a 16-yard pass from quarterback Russell Wilson, in the 12–9 victory.

Darboh was waived by the Seahawks on September 1, 2018.

=== New England Patriots ===
On September 2, Darboh was claimed off waivers by the New England Patriots, but was waived two days with a failed physical designation.

=== Seattle Seahawks (second stint) ===
After being waived by the Patriots due to a failed physical, Darboh reverted to the Seahawks and was placed on injured reserve. He was waived on August 27, 2019.

=== Tampa Bay Buccaneers ===
On September 16, 2019, Darboh was signed to the practice squad of the Tampa Bay Buccaneers. He was promoted to the active roster on October 17, 2019. He was waived on November 5.

=== Pittsburgh Steelers ===
On November 18, 2019, Darboh was signed to the Pittsburgh Steelers practice squad. He was promoted to the active roster on December 16, 2019.

Darboh was waived on September 5, 2020, and was signed to the practice squad the next day. He was released on October 26, 2020.

=== Carolina Panthers ===
On December 11, 2020, Darboh signed with the practice squad of the Carolina Panthers. He signed a reserve/future contract with the Panthers on January 4, 2021, and was released on March 15, 2021.

=== Denver Broncos ===
On June 17, 2021, Darboh signed with the Denver Broncos. He was waived on August 6, 2021.
