= Lano Hill =

American football player (born 1995)

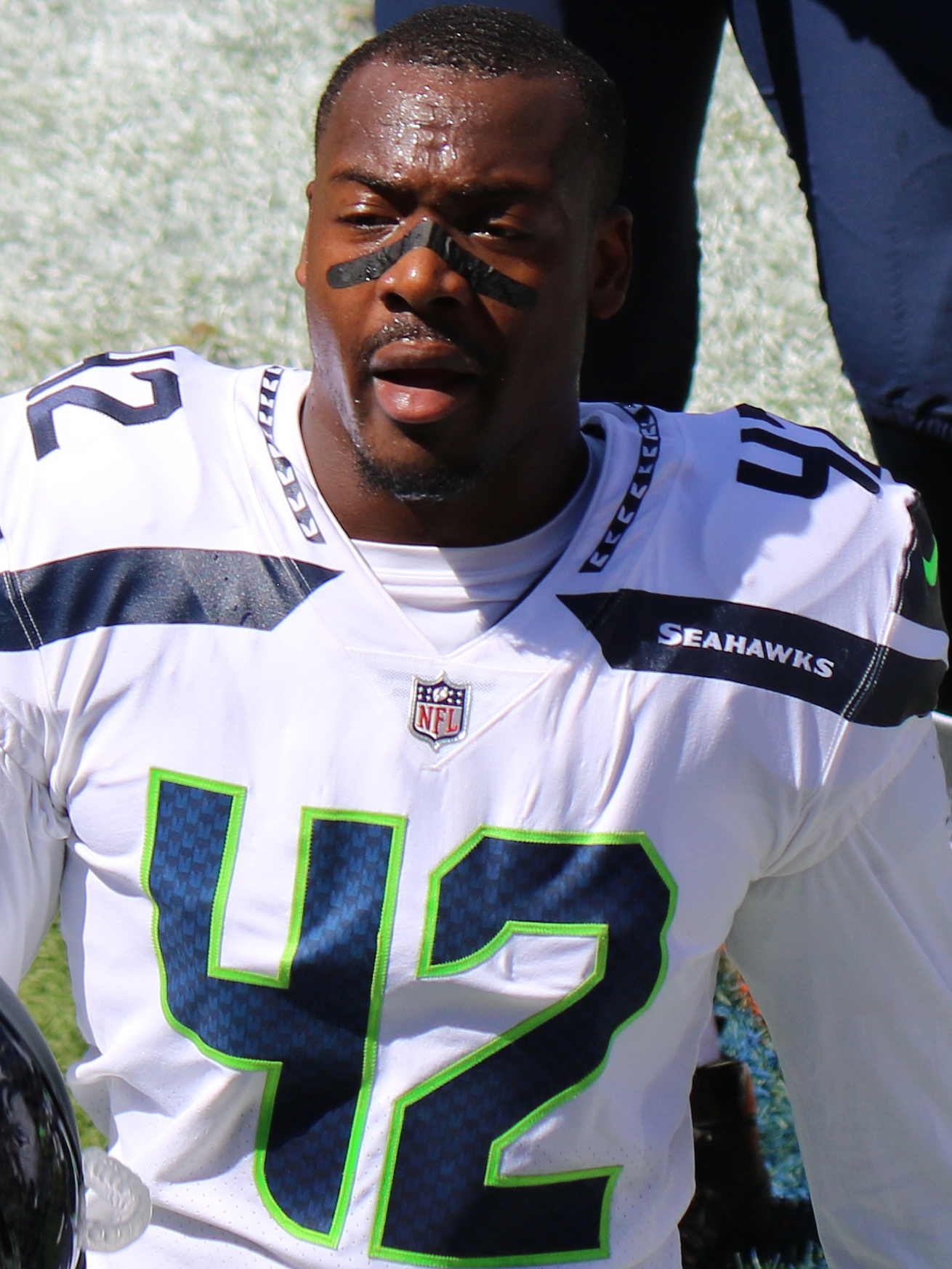
- Lano with the Seattle Seahawks in 2018

No. 42
- Position: Safety

Personal information
- Born: November 26, 1995 (age 30); Detroit, Michigan, U.S.
- Listed height: 6 ft 1 in (1.85 m)
- Listed weight: 216 lb (98 kg)

Career information
- High school: Cass Technical (Detroit)
- College: Michigan
- NFL draft: 2017: 3rd round, 95th overall pick

Career history
- Seattle Seahawks (2017–2020); Carolina Panthers (2021)*; Michigan Panthers (2023)
- * Offseason or practice squad member only

Awards and highlights
- Second-team All-Big Ten (2016)

Career NFL statistics
- Total tackles: 64
- Forced fumbles: 1
- Pass deflections: 1
- Stats at Pro Football Reference

Lano Kash-Pride Hill (born Delano Kash-Pride Hill; November 26, 1995) is an American former professional football player who was a safety in the National Football League (NFL). He played college football for the Michigan Wolverines. He is the older brother of Lavert Hill.

== Early life ==
In high school, Hill and Jourdan Lewis anchored the Cass Technical High School defensive backfield that won the 2011 and 2012 Michigan High School Athletic Association Division 1 championships for coach Thomas Wilcher.

== College career ==
During his senior year, Hill helped lead the defense by posting a career best of 52 tackles, 4.5 tackles-for-loss, three interceptions and three pass breakups. In his four-year career at Michigan, Hill contributed 119 tackles, seven tackles-for-loss, one forced fumble, one fumble recovery, three interceptions and eight pass breakups. Following the 2016 season, Hill was named to the All-Big Ten Conference defensive second-team, by the coaches.

== Professional career ==
External videos
- Delano Hill NFL combine workout
- Delano Hill's 40-yard dash
- Delano Hill's bench press

Pre-draft measurables
Height	Weight	Arm length	Hand span	Wingspan	40-yard dash	10-yard split	20-yard split	20-yard shuttle	Three-cone drill	Vertical jump	Broad jump	Bench press
6 ft 0 3/4 in (1.85 m)	216 lb (98 kg)	32 1/8 in (0.82 m)	9 3/8 in (0.24 m)	6 ft 5 1/2 in (1.97 m)	4.47 s	1.53 s	2.62 s	4.27 s	6.96 s	33.5 in (0.85 m)	9 ft 7 in (2.92 m)	17 reps
All values from NFL Combine

=== Seattle Seahawks ===
The Seattle Seahawks selected Hill in the third round (95th overall) of the 2017 NFL draft. He was the 11th safety selected in 2017. On June 15, 2017, the Seahawks signed him to a four-year, $3.2 million contract that includes a signing bonus of $727,476.

External videos
- Seahawks select Delano Hill 95th overall

On December 12, 2017, Hill was ejected after hitting Mike Thomas and Kevin Peterson after participating on punt recovery plays during a 42–7 loss. On December 22, 2017, the NFL fined him $12,154 for his fight with multiple Rams players.

Hill entered the 2018 season as the third-string free safety behind Earl Thomas and Tedric Thompson. He was later named the backup to Thompson after Thomas was placed on season-ending injured reserve prior to Week 5. Hill made his first start of the season in Week 16 in place of an injured Thompson. He was placed on injured reserve on January 1, 2019 after suffering a hip injury in Week 17.

On October 21, 2020, Hill was placed on injured reserve with a back injury.

=== Carolina Panthers ===
On May 16, 2021, Hill signed with the Carolina Panthers. He was placed on the Reserve/COVID-19 list on July 28, 2021. On August 11, 2021, the Panthers activated him from the reserve/COVID-19 list and then released him.

=== Michigan Panthers ===
On February 17, 2023, Hill signed with the Michigan Panthers of the United States Football League (USFL). He was released on May 11, 2023.
