= Lavert Hill =

American football player (born 1998)

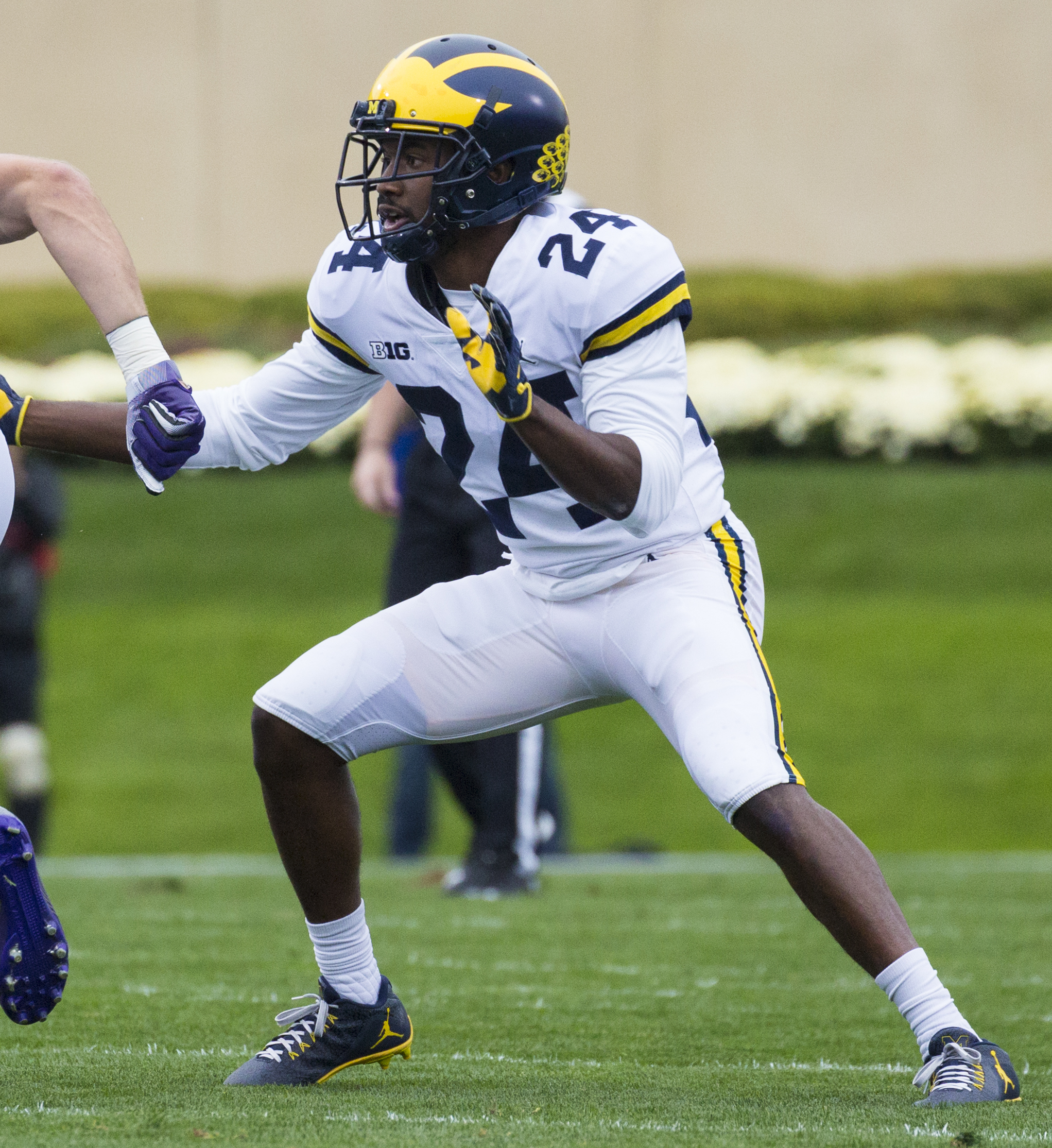
- Hill with Michigan in 2018

Profile
- Position: Cornerback

Personal information
- Born: October 3, 1998 (age 28); Detroit, Michigan, U.S.
- Listed height: 5 ft 10 in (1.78 m)
- Listed weight: 190 lb (86 kg)

Career information
- High school: Martin Luther King (Detroit, Michigan)
- College: Michigan
- NFL draft: 2020: undrafted

Career history
- Kansas City Chiefs (2020)*; Philadelphia Eagles (2020)*; Arizona Cardinals (2021)*; San Francisco 49ers (2021)*; Cleveland Browns (2022)*; St. Louis BattleHawks (2023); Pittsburgh Steelers (2023)*; St. Louis Battlehawks (2024)
- * Offseason or practice squad member only

Awards and highlights
- All-XFL Team (2023); 2× First-team All-Big Ten (2018, 2019); Second-team All-Big Ten (2017)
- Stats at Pro Football Reference

Lavert Hill (born October 3, 1998) is an American football cornerback. He played college football at Michigan. He helped Martin Luther King High School earn the 2015 Michigan High School Athletic Association Division 2 championship and played in the 2016 U.S. Army All-American Bowl. He was recognized as the Lockheed Martin Air Defender of the Year as the nation's top high school defensive back. As a junior at Michigan, he was a 2018 All-Big Ten first-team selection by both the coaches and media. He is the younger brother of Lano Hill.

== Early career ==
In January 2015 Hill gave a verbal commitment to Penn State and transferred from Cass Technical High School to Martin Luther King High School. In November 2015, Hill decommitted from Penn State. As a high school senior, Hill tallied 12 interceptions (3 for touchdowns). Hill made several catches, including two touchdowns as part of Martin Luther King's comeback victory in the 2015 Michigan High School Athletic Association Class 2 championship game over Lowell High School. His brother, Lano, had won two Michigan High School Athletic Association championships at Cass Tech. Lavert Hill was a participant in the 2016 U.S. Army All-American Bowl. He earned the Lockeed Martin Air Defender of the Year honor as the top defensive back in the national class of 2016. On February 2, 2016, he signed with Michigan with the anticipation of playing in the same defensive backfield as his brother for the first time.

College recruiting
Name	Hometown	School	Height	Weight	40^{‡}	Commit date
Lavert Hill; CB	Detroit, Michigan	MLK H.S.	5 ft 10 in (1.78 m)	176 lb (80 kg)	4.41	Feb 3, 2016
Lavert Hill; CB	Recruit ratings: Scout: Rivals: 247Sports: ESPN:					
Overall recruit ranking:
‡ Refers to 40-yard dash; Note: In many cases, Scout, Rivals, 247Sports, On3, and ESPN may conflict in their listings of height, weight and 40 time.; In these cases, the average was taken. ESPN grades are on a 100-point scale.; Sources: "Michigan Football Commitments". Rivals.; "2016 Michigan Football Commits". Scout.; "ESPN". ESPN.; "Scout.com Team Recruiting Rankings". Scout.; "2016 Team Ranking". Rivals.com.

== College career ==
Hill's mentors at Michigan were Cass Tech alums cornerback Jourdan Lewis and his safety brother. He made his debut on September 3, 2016, against Hawaii in the season opener as one of 17 true freshmen to appear in the game. Hill's first career start was for the 2017 Michigan Wolverines football team against Florida on September 2, 2017. He had an interception return for a touchdown a week later against Cincinnati. Following the season Hill earned 2017 All-Big Ten team recognition from the coaches (second-team) and the media (honorable mention). His brother, Lano, had been a second-team (coaches) and honorable mention (media) honoree for the 2016 All-Big Ten team. On October 13, 2018, against Wisconsin, Hill recorded a 21-yard interception return for a touchdown. He became the third player in Michigan program history to register two interception returns for touchdowns, following Lance Dottin and Thom Darden. Following the 2018 season, Hill was named to the 2018 All-Big Ten defensive first-team by both the coaches and media. During the 2019 season, Hill led the Big Ten in passer rating against (23.9 passer rating allowed), and made 15 tackles with a team-leading 12 pass breakups (nine breakups, three interceptions). Following the season, Hill was named to the 2019 All-Big Ten defensive first-team by both the coaches and media.

== Professional career ==
Pre-draft measurables
Height	Weight	Arm length	Hand span	Wingspan	Bench press
5 ft 10 in (1.78 m)	190 lb (86 kg)	30 7/8 in (0.78 m)	9 1/8 in (0.23 m)	6 ft 2 3/8 in (1.89 m)	21 reps
All values from NFL Combine

=== Kansas City Chiefs ===
Hill signed with the Kansas City Chiefs as an undrafted free agent on April 26, 2020. He was waived during final roster cuts on September 5, 2020. He was signed to the practice squad the following day. He was released on November 24, 2020.

=== Philadelphia Eagles ===
On December 8, 2020, Hill was signed to the Philadelphia Eagles practice squad. He signed a reserve/future contract with the Eagles on January 4, 2021.

On August 23, 2021, Hill was waived by the Eagles.

=== Arizona Cardinals ===
On October 26, 2021, Hill was signed to the Arizona Cardinals practice squad. He was released on November 1.

=== San Francisco 49ers ===
On December 15, 2021, Hill was signed to the San Francisco 49ers practice squad.

=== Cleveland Browns ===
On August 5, 2022, Hill signed with the Cleveland Browns. Hill was waived with an injured designation on August 30; after clearing waivers, he reverted to the Browns' injured reserve list on August 31. He was released on September 9.

=== St. Louis Battlehawks ===
On February 1, 2023, Hill signed with the St. Louis Battlehawks of the XFL. In 10 games, Hill recorded 25 tackles and 2 interceptions. Following the season, he was named to the All-XFL Team.

=== Pittsburgh Steelers ===
On August 14, 2023, Hill signed with the Pittsburgh Steelers. He was waived on August 28, 2023.

=== St. Louis Battlehawks (second stint) ===
On January 31, 2024, Hill re-signed with the St. Louis Battlehawks.
