= Kyle Kalis =

American football player (born 1993)

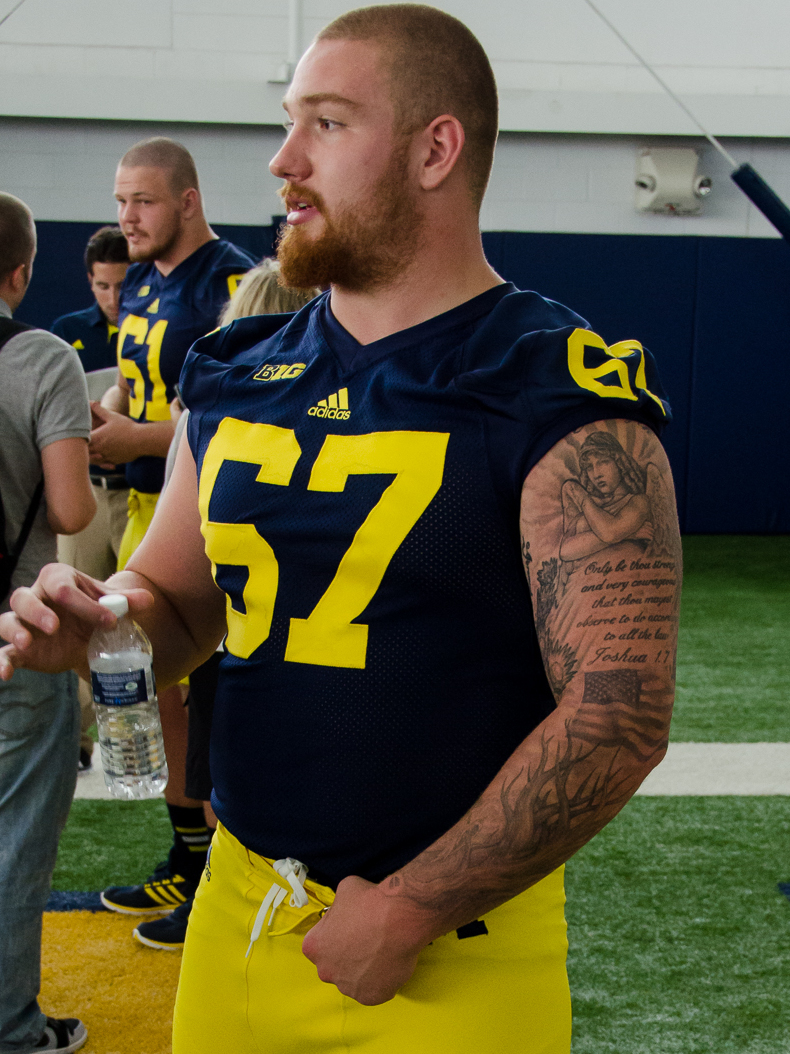
- Kalis with the Michigan Wolverines in 2014

No. 68
- Position: Guard / Center

Personal information
- Born: December 21, 1993 (age 32); Lakewood, Ohio, U.S.
- Listed height: 6 ft 5 in (1.96 m)
- Listed weight: 315 lb (143 kg)

Career information
- High school: St. Edward (Lakewood)
- College: Michigan (2012–2016)
- NFL draft: 2017: undrafted

Career history
- Washington Redskins (2017)*; Indianapolis Colts (2017); Washington Redskins (2017); Cleveland Browns (2018–2019); Oakland / Las Vegas Raiders (2019–2020)*
- * Offseason or practice squad member only

Awards and highlights
- Second-team All-American (2016); Second-team All-Big Ten (2016); Third-team All-Big Ten (2015)

Career NFL statistics
- Games played: 7
- Games started: 2
- Stats at Pro Football Reference

Kyle Brockton Kalis (born December 21, 1993) is an American former professional football player who was a guard and center in the National Football League (NFL). He was selected as a first-team All-American by Sports Illustrated and Parade magazine during his senior year in high school, as well as the number one recruit in Ohio for the class of 2012. A five-star prospect according to rivals.com and scout.com, he became one of the top recruits in the 2012 college football recruiting class. Kalis played college football for the Michigan Wolverines, starting 47 games at right guard. He was signed by the Washington Redskins as an undrafted free agent in 2017.

== Early life ==
Kalis is the son of Todd Kalis, an offensive lineman who played eight years in the NFL with the Minnesota Vikings, Pittsburgh Steelers and Cincinnati Bengals. He was the only freshman on the varsity football team at Seneca Valley High School in Harmony, PA. He played the remainder of his high school football career at St. Edward High School in Lakewood Ohio near Bay Village, where he lived with his mother, Stephanie Garvin Schwarz. In December 2011, he was one of five offensive linemen selected by Sports Illustrated for its high school football All-America first-team. In January 2012, he was also named to Parade magazine and U.S. Army All-American football teams. He was one of six finalists for the Anthony Munoz Lineman of the Year Award, presented to the best high school lineman in the United States.

=== Recruiting ===
Kalis was one of the top-rated recruits in the 2012 college football recruiting class. He was rated as a five-star prospect by both Rivals.com and Scout.com. He was also a finalist for the U.S. Army Player of the Year award. He was rated as the No. 1 prospect from Ohio and the No. 4-ranked offensive tackle in the United States by Rivals.com.

In September 2010, Kalis verbally committed to Ohio State. In July 2011, Kalis switched his commitment from Ohio State to Michigan in the wake of a memorabilia-for-gifts scandal that led to the resignation of head coach Jim Tressel.

== College career ==
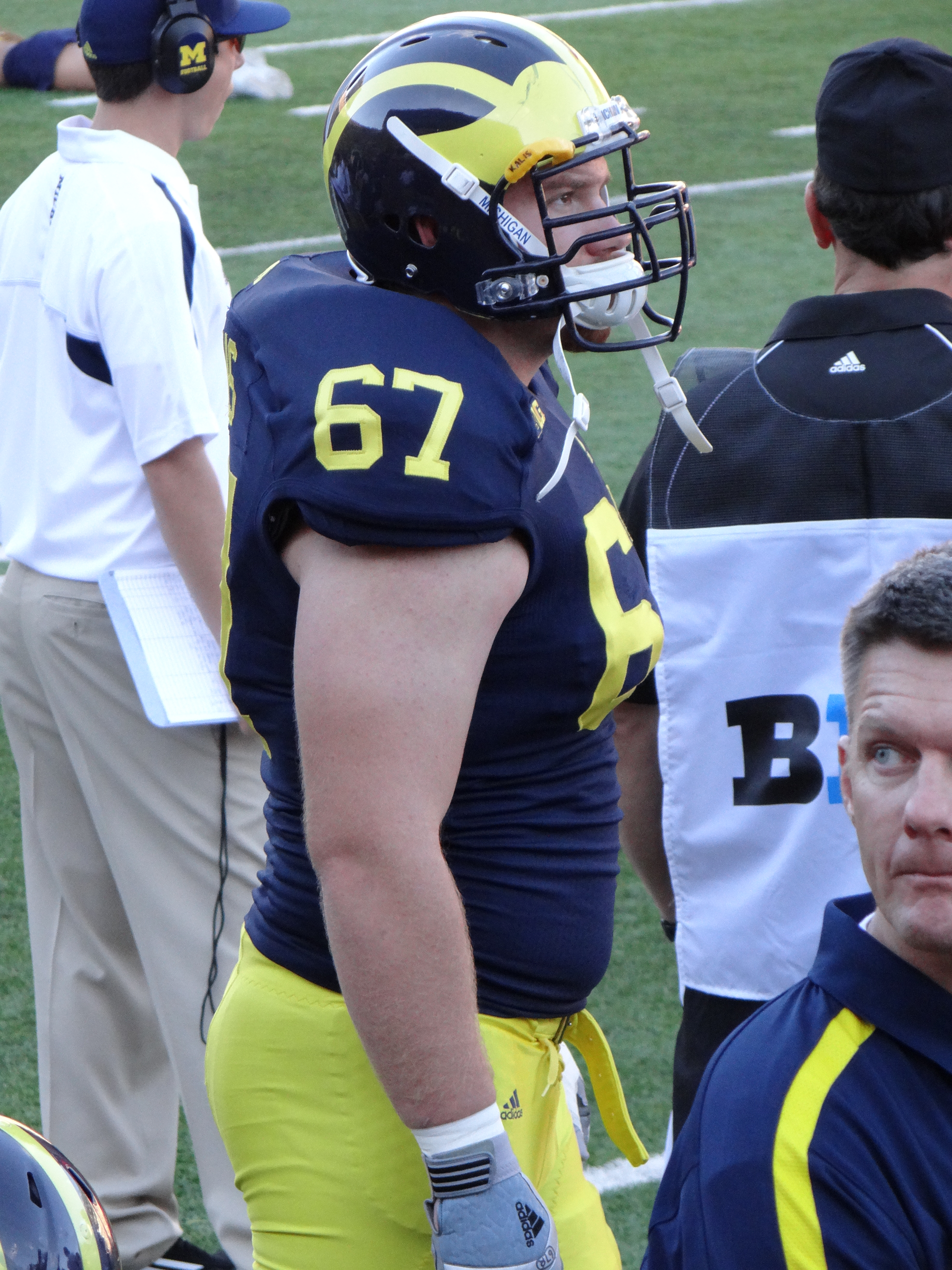
Kalis with the Michigan Wolverines in 2012.

Kalis conveyed his commitment to Michigan head coach Brady Hoke from the "M" logo at the middle of the field at Michigan Stadium. He also told reporters, "I believe the Michigan-Ohio border is now open. I think you're going to see eight or nine guys from the state of Ohio going over to Michigan this year." Kalis became the subject of threats from Ohio State fans. Kalis commented on the threats, "There are really a lot of stupid people out there. I'd get people telling me they were going to come to my house with bats to tear my ACL. I got plenty of threats, even a few death threats. I gave my address out to about 20 people and told them to come find me. Nobody came."

Kalis enrolled at the University of Michigan in 2012. In late August 2012, the International Business Times selected Kalis as one of the five best incoming freshmen in the Big Ten Conference. He played for the Wolverines from 2013 to 2016. Following the 2016 season, Kalis was named to the All-Big Ten offensive second-team, by both the coaches and media, and was named a Second-team All-American by the American Football Coaches Association.

== Professional career ==
=== Washington Redskins (first stint) ===
After going undrafted in the 2017 NFL draft, Kalis signed with the Washington Redskins as an undrafted free agent on May 4, 2017. On September 2, 2017, he was waived by the team and was signed to the practice squad the next day.

=== Indianapolis Colts ===
On October 3, 2017, Kalis was signed by the Indianapolis Colts off the Redskins' practice squad. He soon earned playing time and saw his first offensive game action against the Bengals, starting the second half. He went on to start 2 more games, against the Texans, and the Steelers. He was waived/injured by the Colts on December 2, 2017.

=== Washington Redskins (second stint) ===
On December 4, 2017, Kalis was claimed off waivers by the Redskins, where he then remained inactive for the last 4 games of the season.

On September 1, 2018, Kalis was waived for final roster cuts before the start of the 2018 season.

=== Cleveland Browns ===
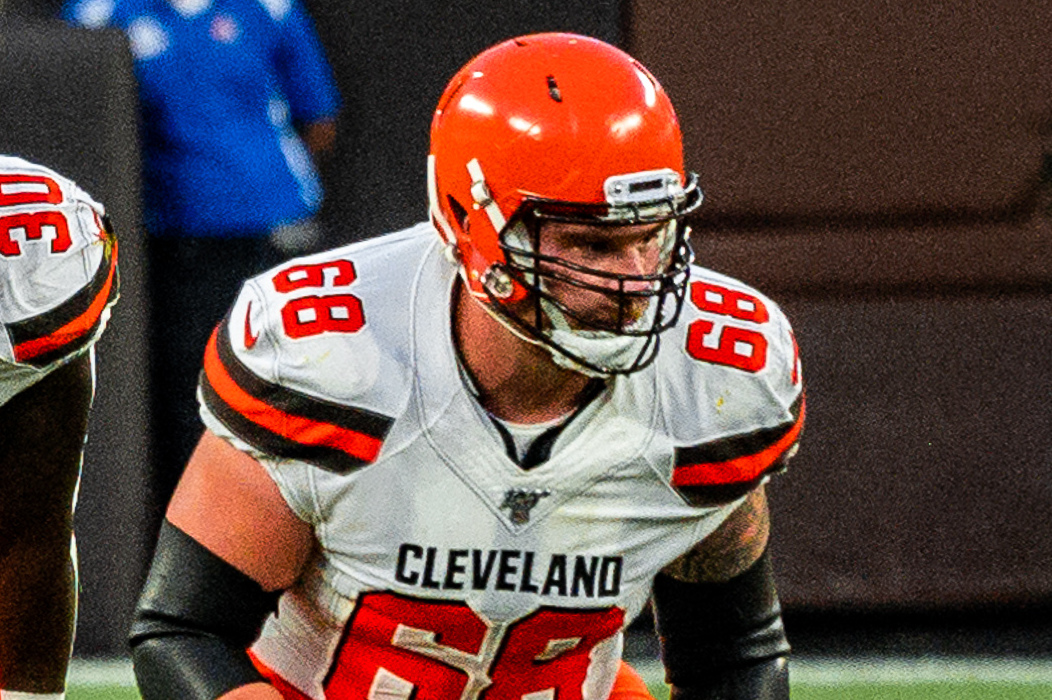
Kalis with the Cleveland Browns in 2019

On September 3, 2018, Kalis was signed to the Cleveland Browns' practice squad. The Browns signed Kalis to their active roster on December 1, 2018.

Kalis was waived with an injury designation during final roster cuts on August 31, 2019, and subsequently reverted to injured reserve the next day. He was waived from injured reserve with an injury settlement on September 11.

=== Oakland / Las Vegas Raiders ===
On October 23, 2019, Kalis was signed to the Oakland Raiders practice squad. He was released on December 4, 2019. He was re-signed on December 11. On December 30, 2019, Kalis was signed to a reserve/future contract. He was waived on May 5, 2020.
