= 2014 Michigan Wolverines football team =

American college football season

2014 Michigan Wolverines football
- Conference: Big Ten Conference
- East Division
- Record: 5–7 (3–5 Big Ten)
- Head coach: Brady Hoke (4th season)
- Offensive coordinator: Doug Nussmeier (1st season)
- Offensive scheme: Pro-style
- Defensive coordinator: Greg Mattison (6th season)
- Base defense: 4–3
- MVP: Jake Ryan
- Captains: Devin Gardner; Jake Ryan
- Home stadium: Michigan Stadium

2014 Big Ten Conference football standings
	Conf.			Overall
Team	W		L	W		L
East Division
No. 1 Ohio State x$#^	8	–	0	14	–	1
No. T–5 Michigan State	7	–	1	11	–	2
Maryland	4	–	4	7	–	6
Rutgers	3	–	5	8	–	5
Michigan	3	–	5	5	–	7
Penn State	2	–	6	7	–	6
Indiana	1	–	7	4	–	8
West Division
No. 13 Wisconsin x	7	–	1	11	–	3
Minnesota	5	–	3	8	–	5
Nebraska	5	–	3	9	–	4
Iowa	4	–	4	7	–	6
Illinois	3	–	5	6	–	7
Northwestern	3	–	5	5	–	7
Purdue	1	–	7	3	–	9
Championship: Ohio State 59, Wisconsin 0
# – College Football Playoff champion; ^ – College Football Playoff participant; $ – Conference champion; x – Division champion/co-champions; Rankings from AP Poll

The 2014 Michigan Wolverines football team represented the University of Michigan in the sport of college football during the 2014 NCAA Division I FBS football season. The Wolverines played in the new East Division of the Big Ten Conference and played their home games at Michigan Stadium in Ann Arbor, Michigan. The team was led by fourth-year head coach Brady Hoke. It was nicknamed "Team 135" in reference to the 135th year of the Michigan football program.

The season was characterized by a growing frustration among Michigan fans and media with the coaching of Brady Hoke and the leadership of athletic director Dave Brandon. After opening the year with a victory against Appalachian State in their first meeting since the Wolverines shocking loss in 2007 they suffered their first shutout loss since 1984 and the most lopsided defeat in series history when they lost to Notre Dame 31–0. In a 30–14 loss to Minnesota three weeks later, coach Hoke received criticism for keeping quarterback Shane Morris in the game after he appeared to have suffered a concussion. After losing to Rutgers, Michigan was 0–2 in Big Ten play for the first time since 1967. Michigan ultimately compiled a 5–7 record, including 3–5 in conference play to finish in a tie for fourth place in the East Division. This marked the first season since 2009, and only the third season since 1975, in which Michigan missed a bowl game.

On October 31, following large student demonstrations, athletic director Dave Brandon resigned. On December 2, head coach Brady Hoke was fired. He finished at Michigan with a four-year record of 31–20.

== Preseason ==
The 2013 team compiled a 7–6 record under third-year head coach Brady Hoke and faced Kansas State in the Buffalo Wild Wings Bowl, losing 31–14.

Hoke announced that the quarterback position was an open battle prior to spring practice, notably including 5th-year senior Devin Gardner and sophomore Shane Morris, and later named Gardner the starter on August 12. On February 12, Michigan announced that tight end Jake Butt suffered a torn ACL and would miss all of spring practice. On March 20, Michigan announced that center Graham Glasgow would be suspended for a portion of spring practice and the season opener against Appalachian State for a violation of team rules stemming from a drunk driving arrest. On June 10, Michigan announced that running back Ty Isaac was transferring to the team from USC, but the NCAA denied his request for a waiver to play for Michigan immediately, forcing him to redshirt the 2014 season.

Michigan returned 15 starters from the 2013 team. Michigan lost starting running back Fitzgerald Toussaint, wide receiver Jeremy Gallon, offensive tackles Taylor Lewan and Michael Schofield, safety Thomas Gordon, defensive tackles Jibreel Black and Quinton Washington, kicker Brendan Gibbons, and long snapper Jareth Glanda to graduation.

== Recruiting ==
=== Recruits ===
Michigan's recruiting class consisted of 16 recruits. Jabrill Peppers was the considered highlight of the class; he was ranked as the third overall recruit in the country by 247's composite rankings, which averages the rankings of Rivals, Scout, ESPN, and 247.

College recruiting information (2014)
Name	Hometown	School	Height	Weight	40^{‡}	Commit date
Ian Bunting; TE	Hinsdale, Illinois	Hinsdale Central H.S.	6 ft 7 in (2.01 m)	215 lb (98 kg)	–	Apr 23, 2013
Ian Bunting; TE	Recruit ratings: Scout: Rivals: 247Sports: ESPN:					
Juwann Bushell-Beatty; OL	Paramus, New Jersey	Paramus Catholic H.S.	6 ft 5 in (1.96 m)	295 lb (134 kg)	–	Apr 28, 2013
Juwann Bushell-Beatty; OL	Recruit ratings: Scout: Rivals: 247Sports: ESPN:					
Freddy Canteen; WR	Elkton, Maryland	Eastern Christian Academy	6 ft 1.5 in (1.87 m)	170 lb (77 kg)	4.43	Jun 29, 2013
Freddy Canteen; WR	Recruit ratings: Scout: Rivals: 247Sports: ESPN:					
Mason Cole; OL	Tarpon Springs, Florida	East Lake H.S.	6 ft 5 in (1.96 m)	275 lb (125 kg)	–	Feb 25, 2012
Mason Cole; OL	Recruit ratings: Scout: Rivals: 247Sports: ESPN:					
Michael Ferns; LB	St. Clairsville, Ohio	St. Clairsville H.S.	6 ft 3 in (1.91 m)	235 lb (107 kg)	–	Aug 9, 2012
Michael Ferns; LB	Recruit ratings: Scout: Rivals: 247Sports: ESPN:					
Noah Furbush; LB	Kenton, Ohio	Kenton H.S.	6 ft 4 in (1.93 m)	233 lb (106 kg)	–	Jul 1, 2013
Noah Furbush; LB	Recruit ratings: Scout: Rivals: 247Sports: ESPN:					
Drake Harris; WR	Grand Rapids, Michigan	Grand Rapids Christian H.S.	6 ft 4 in (1.93 m)	180 lb (82 kg)	4.4	Apr 14, 2013
Drake Harris; WR	Recruit ratings: Scout: Rivals: 247Sports: ESPN:					
Lawrence Marshall; DE	Southfield, Michigan	Southfield H.S.	6 ft 4 in (1.93 m)	205 lb (93 kg)	–	May 11, 2013
Lawrence Marshall; DE	Recruit ratings: Scout: Rivals: 247Sports: ESPN:					
Bryan Mone; DT	Salt Lake City, Utah	Highland H.S.	6 ft 4 in (1.93 m)	315 lb (143 kg)	–	Feb 12, 2013
Bryan Mone; DT	Recruit ratings: Scout: Rivals: 247Sports: ESPN:					
Brady Pallante; DT	Naples, Florida	Barron Collier H.S.	6 ft 0.75 in (1.85 m)	262.5 lb (119.1 kg)	4.975	Apr 5, 2013
Brady Pallante; DT	Recruit ratings: Scout: Rivals: 247Sports: ESPN:					
Jabrill Peppers; DB	Paramus, New Jersey	Paramus Catholic H.S.	6 ft 1 in (1.85 m)	210 lb (95 kg)	–	May 26, 2013
Jabrill Peppers; DB	Recruit ratings: Scout: Rivals: 247Sports: ESPN:					
Wilton Speight; QB	Richmond, Virginia	The Collegiate School	6 ft 6 in (1.98 m)	217 lb (98 kg)	4.7	Feb 6, 2013
Wilton Speight; QB	Recruit ratings: Scout: Rivals: 247Sports: ESPN:					
Jared Wangler; LB	Warren, Michigan	De La Salle H.S.	6 ft 1.5 in (1.87 m)	215 lb (98 kg)	4.51	Aug 9, 2013
Jared Wangler; LB	Recruit ratings: Scout: Rivals: 247Sports: ESPN:					
Brandon Watson; DB	Elkton, Maryland	Eastern Christian Maryland	6 ft 0 in (1.83 m)	187.5 lb (85.0 kg)	4.5	Jun 29, 2013
Brandon Watson; DB	Recruit ratings: Scout: Rivals: 247Sports: ESPN:					
Mauriece Ways; WR	Beverly Hills, Michigan	Detroit Country Day	6 ft 3 in (1.91 m)	195 lb (88 kg)	–	Apr 25, 2013
Mauriece Ways; WR	Recruit ratings: Scout: Rivals: 247Sports: ESPN:					
Chase Winovich; LB	Jefferson Hills, Pennsylvania	Thomas Jefferson H.S.	6 ft 3.5 in (1.92 m)	217 lb (98 kg)	–	Jun 1, 2013
Chase Winovich; LB	Recruit ratings: Scout: Rivals: 247Sports: ESPN:					
Overall recruit ranking: Scout: 27 Rivals: 31 247Sports: 20 ESPN: 18
‡ Refers to 40-yard dash; Note: In many cases, Scout, Rivals, 247Sports, On3, and ESPN may conflict in their listings of height, weight and 40 time.; In these cases, the average was taken. ESPN grades are on a 100-point scale.; Sources: "Michigan Football Commitments". Rivals.; "2014 Michigan Football Commits". Scout.; "ESPN". ESPN.; "Scout.com Team Recruiting Rankings". Scout.; "2014 Team Ranking". Rivals.com.

== Schedule ==
Date	Time	Opponent	Site	TV	Result	Attendance	Source
August 30	12:00 p.m.	Appalachian State*	Michigan Stadium; Ann Arbor, MI	ESPN2	W 52–14	106,811	
September 6	7:30 p.m.	at No. 16 Notre Dame*	Notre Dame Stadium; Notre Dame, IN (rivalry)	NBC	L 0–31	80,795	
September 13	3:30 p.m.	Miami (OH)*	Michigan Stadium; Ann Arbor, MI	BTN	W 34–10	102,824	
September 20	3:30 p.m.	Utah*	Michigan Stadium; Ann Arbor, MI	ABC, ESPN2	L 10–26	103,890	
September 27	3:30 p.m.	Minnesota	Michigan Stadium; Ann Arbor, MI (Little Brown Jug)	ABC, ESPN2	L 14–30	102,926	
October 4	7:00 p.m.	at Rutgers	High Point Solutions Stadium; Piscataway, NJ	BTN	L 24–26	53,327	
October 11	7:00 p.m.	Penn State	Michigan Stadium; Ann Arbor, MI (rivalry)	ESPN2	W 18–13	113,085	
October 25	3:30 p.m.	at No. 8 Michigan State	Spartan Stadium; East Lansing, MI (rivalry)	ABC	L 11–35	76,331	
November 1	3:30 p.m.	Indiana^{†}	Michigan Stadium; Ann Arbor, MI	BTN	W 34–10	103,111	
November 8	3:30 p.m.	at Northwestern	Ryan Field; Evanston, IL (rivalry)	ESPN2	W 10–9	42,429	
November 22	3:30 p.m.	Maryland	Michigan Stadium; Ann Arbor, MI	BTN	L 16–23	101,717	
November 29	12:00 p.m.	at No. 6 Ohio State	Ohio Stadium; Columbus, OH (The Game)	ABC	L 28–42	108,610	
*Non-conference game; ^{†}Homecoming; Rankings from AP Poll released prior to the game; All times are in Eastern time

== Radio ==
Radio coverage for all games was broadcast statewide on The Michigan Wolverines Football Network and on Sirius XM Satellite Radio. The radio announcers were Jim Brandstatter with play-by-play, Dan Dierdorf with color commentary, and Doug Karsch with sideline reports. Frank Beckmann retired after the 2013 season after 32 years as Michigan's play-by-play announcer.

== Game summaries ==
=== Vs. Appalachian State ===
Appalachian State at Michigan

Team	1	2	3	4	Total
Mountaineers	0	0	7	7	14
• Wolverines	14	21	14	3	52

- Date: August 30
- Location: Michigan Stadium
  Ann Arbor, Michigan
- Game start: 12:01 p.m. EDT
- Elapsed time: 3:17
- Game attendance: 106,811
- Game weather: Low 80s, Cloudy, SW 10–15 MPH
- Referee: Jeff Maconaghy
- TV announcers (ESPN2): Beth Mowins, Joey Galloway & Paul Carcaterra

Scoring summary
1	8:48	MICH	Devin Funchess 9-yard pass from Devin Gardner (Matt Wile kick)	MICH 7–0
1	1:52	MICH	Devin Funchess 34-yard pass from Devin Gardner (Matt Wile kick)	MICH 14–0
1	3:59	MICH	Devin Funchess 8-yard pass from Devin Gardner (Matt Wile kick)	MICH 21–0
2	1:26	MICH	De'Veon Smith 12-yard run (Matt Wile kick)	MICH 28–0
2	:48	MICH	Ben Gedeon 32-yard blocked punt return (Matt Wile kick)	MICH 35–0
3	11:36	MICH	Derrick Green 1-yard run (Matt Wile kick)	MICH 42–0
3	7:12	APP	Simms McElfresh 8-yard pass from Kameron Bryant (Zach Matics kick)	MICH 42–7
3	4:27	MICH	De'Veon Smith 13-yard run (Matt Wile kick)	MICH 49–7
4	9:05	APP	Marcus Cox 1-yard run (Zach Matics kick)	MICH 49–14
4	3:42	MICH	Matt Wile 18-yard field goal	MICH 52–14

To open the season, Michigan faced the Appalachian State Mountaineers. During the previous meeting, Appalachian State became the first football championship subdivision (FCS) team to defeat a top 25 football bowl subdivision (FBS) team, defeating Michigan 34–32 in a massive upset. Prior to the game, Michigan announced that Devin Funchess would wear the #1 jersey, making him the first player to wear the #1 jersey since Braylon Edwards in 2004.

Michigan dominated the game, winning 52–14. Michigan opened the scoring in the first quarter with an eight-yard touchdown pass from Devin Gardner to Funchess, and expanded its lead late in the first quarter with a 34-yard touchdown pass from Gardner to Funchess. In the second quarter, Gardner threw his third touchdown pass of the game to Funchess giving Michigan a 21–0 lead. Michigan then scored 14 points in 38 seconds via a 12-yard touchdown run from De'Veon Smith and a 32-yard blocked punt return for a touchdown by Ben Gedeon giving Michigan a 35–0 lead at halftime. Michigan extended its lead in the third quarter via a one-yard touchdown run from Derrick Green before Appalachian State responded with an eight-yard touchdown pass from Kameron Bryant to Simms McElfresh. Michigan responded with a 13-yard touchdown run from Smith, making the score 49–7 at the end of the third quarter. In the fourth quarter, Appalachian State reduced Michigan's lead to 35 points via one-yard touchdown run from Marcus Cox, but Michigan ended the scoring via an 18-yard field goal from Matt Wile.

Michigan's captains for the game were Brennen Beyer, Frank Clark, Gardner, Desmond Morgan, and Jake Ryan. Freshman Mason Cole became the first true freshman in Michigan football history to start the season opener on the offensive line. Michigan scored 35 or more points in a half for the first time since the 2013 season opener against Central Michigan and scored more than 50 points in a game for the second consecutive season opener. Gardner completed 13 of 14 pass attempts for 173 yards and three touchdowns, with all three of those touchdowns being thrown to Funchess. Funchess's seven receptions matched a career-high, and his three touchdown receptions set a new career high. Derrick Green and De'Veon Smith each rushed for more than 100 yards—Green had 15 carries for 170 yards and a touchdown, while Smith had eight carries for 115 yards and two touchdowns—with both setting career highs for rushing yardage. This was the first game since 2007 that two Michigan running backs each had over 100 rushing yards, when Brandon Minor and Carlos Brown each rushed for over 100 yards against Minnesota. Ben Gedeon recorded his first career touchdown when returning a blocked punt in the second quarter. It was Michigan's first blocked punt return for a touchdown since the season opener against Central Michigan in 2013. Morgan and James Ross III led Michigan's defense with six tackles each, while Dymonte Thomas, Joe Bolden, and Ondre Pipkins each recorded a career-high five tackles.

=== At Notre Dame ===
Michigan at Notre Dame
(Michigan – Notre Dame rivalry game)

Team	1	2	3	4	Total
Wolverines	0	0	0	0	0
• #16 Fighting Irish	7	14	7	3	31

- Date: September 6
- Location: Notre Dame Stadium
  South Bend, Indiana
- Game start: 7:42 p.m. EDT
- Elapsed time: 3:17
- Game attendance: 80,795
- Game weather: 70°F, Clear, NW 10 MPH
- Referee: John O'Neill
- TV announcers (NBC): Dan Hicks, Mike Mayock & Kathryn Tappen

Scoring summary
1	1:50	ND	Cam McDaniel 1-yard run (Kyle Brindza kick)	ND 7–0
2	3:58	ND	Amir Carlisle 1-yard pass from Everett Golson (Kyle Brindza kick)	ND 14–0
2	:34	ND	Will Fuller 24-yard pass from Everett Golson (Kyle Brindza kick)	ND 21–0
3	3:02	ND	Will Fuller 12-yard pass from Everett Golson (Kyle Brindza kick)	ND 28–0
4	12:03	ND	Kyle Brindza 43-yard field goal	ND 31–0

Following its game against Appalachian State, Michigan visited the Notre Dame Fighting Irish. This was the final game in the rivalry before it went on a hiatus. Michigan won the previous meeting 41–30.

Notre Dame shut out Michigan for the first time in series history, winning 31–0. Notre Dame opened the scoring in the first quarter via a one-yard touchdown run from Cam McDaniel, and then added to its lead in the second quarter with a one-yard touchdown pass from Everett Golson to Amir Carlisle. Shortly before halftime, Notre Dame made it 21–0 with a 24-yard touchdown pass from Golson to Will Fuller. In the third quarter, Notre Dame added to its lead with a 12-yard touchdown pass from Golson to Fuller, and then ended the scoring in the fourth quarter with a 43-yard field goal from Kyle Brindza.

This was the first time Michigan had been shut out since 1984 when it lost to Iowa 26–0, and it snapped an NCAA record of most consecutive games in which Michigan had scored a point at 365 games. Devin Funchess caught a career-high nine passes in the game, while Jake Ryan tied a career-high with eleven tackles. Jake Butt returned from his ACL injury to play for the first time this season. The captains for the game were Blake Countess, Will Hagerup, Joe Kerridge, and Raymon Taylor. Michigan's record against Notre Dame dropped to 24–17–1 with the loss.

=== Vs. Miami (OH) ===
Miami (OH) at Michigan

Team	1	2	3	4	Total
Redhawks	0	10	0	0	10
• Wolverines	10	7	7	10	34

- Date: September 13
- Location: Michigan Stadium
  Ann Arbor, Michigan
- Game start: 3:42 p.m. EDT
- Elapsed time: 3:02
- Game attendance: 102,824
- Game weather: High 50s, Partly cloudy, WNW 15 MPH
- Referee: Dan Capron
- TV announcers (BTN): Eric Collins, Marcus Ray, Lisa Byington

Scoring summary
1	11:13	MICH	Matt Wile 29-yard field goal	MICH 3–0
1	7:00	MICH	Amara Darboh 17-yard pass from Devin Gardner (Matt Wile kick)	MICH 10–0
2	9:14	MU	Kaleb Patterson 26-yard field goal	MICH 10–3
2	7:24	MU	Dawan Scott 3-yard pass from Andrew Hendrix (Kaleb Patterson kick)	Tie 10–10
2	4:26	MICH	Derrick Green 1-yard run (Matt Wile kick)	MICH 17–10
3	11:36	MICH	Jake Butt 29-yard pass from Devin Gardner (Matt Wile kick)	MICH 24–10
4	9:50	MICH	Derrick Green 12-yard run (Matt Wile kick)	MICH 31–10
4	:18	MICH	Matt Wile 40-yard field goal	MICH 34–10

Following the game against Notre Dame, Michigan hosted the Miami (OH) Redhawks. This was the first meeting between the two teams since 2008, which Michigan won 16–6.

Michigan won the game 34–10. Michigan opened the scoring in the first quarter with a 29-yard field goal from Matt Wile and added to its lead with a 17-yard touchdown pass from Gardner to Amara Darboh. Miami responded with ten points of its own in the second quarter to tie the game at ten with those points coming via a 26-yard field goal from Kaleb Patterson and a three-yard touchdown pass from Andrew Hendrix to Dawan Scott. Michigan regained the lead before halftime via a Derrick Green one-yard touchdown run, which made the score 17–10 in favor of Michigan at half-time. Michigan added to its lead in the third quarter via a 29-yard touchdown pass from Gardner to Jake Butt, and then increased its lead in the fourth quarter to 21 points via a 12-yard touchdown run from Green. Michigan ended the scoring in the fourth quarter with a 40-yard field goal from Wile.

Michigan's defense held Miami to 33 rushing yards, the lowest amount since Michigan allowed 32 rushing yards to Bowling Green in 2010. Derrick Green ran for 137 yards and two touchdowns, the first multi-touchdown performance of his career. Darboh had eight receptions for 88 yards, both career highs, and a touchdown. Jourdan Lewis intercepted a pass in the first quarter; this was Michigan's first forced turnover of the season. Jabrill Peppers recorded a career-high three tackles. The announced attendance of 102,824 pushed Michigan's streak of consecutive games with more than 100,000 fans in attendance to 253, but was Michigan's lowest attendance since a matchup against Memphis in 1995 that drew a crowd of 100,862.

=== Vs. Utah ===
Utah at Michigan

Team	1	2	3	4	Total
• Utes	3	10	7	6	26
Wolverines	3	7	0	0	10

- Date: September 20
- Location: Michigan Stadium
  Ann Arbor, Michigan
- Game start: 3:36 p.m. EDT
- Elapsed time: 3:11 (with a 2:24 weather delay)
- Game attendance: 103,890
- Game weather: High 70s, Cloudy with rain, SW 15–25 MPH
- Referee: Shawn Smith
- TV announcers (ABC/ESPN2): Sean McDonough, Chris Spielman & Todd McShay

Scoring summary
1	9:36	MICH	Matt Wile 42-yard field goal	MICH 3–0
1	1:03	UTAH	Andy Phillips 35-yard field goal	Tie 3–3
2	14:39	UTAH	Kaelin Clay 66-yard punt return (Andy Phillips kick)	UTAH 10–3
2	5:01	MICH	Willie Henry 7-yard interception return (Matt Wile kick)	Tie 10–10
2	:00	UTAH	Andy Phillips 38-yard field goal	UTAH 13–10
3	13:33	UTAH	Dres Anderson 28-yard pass from Travis Wilson (Andy Phillips kick)	UTAH 20–10
4	14:20	UTAH	Andy Phillips 48-yard field goal	UTAH 23–10
4	10:50	UTAH	Andy Phillips 50-yard field goal	UTAH 26–10

Following its game against Miami, Michigan faced the Utah Utes. This was the first meeting since 2008, which Utah won 25–23.

Utah defeated Michigan 26–10 in a game that featured an almost two-and-a-half hour weather delay. Michigan opened the scoring in the first quarter via a Matt Wile 42-yard field goal, but Utah responded with a 35-yard field goal from Andy Phillips. Utah then took the lead in the second quarter via a Kaelin Clay 66-yard punt return for a touchdown, but Michigan tied the game via a Willie Henry seven-yard interception return for a touchdown. Utah then took the lead for good right before halftime via a 38-yard field goal from Phillips. In the third quarter, Utah extended its lead via a 28-yard pass from Travis Wilson to Dres Anderson. Utah ended the scoring in the fourth quarter with two Phillips field goals from 48 and 50 yards.

The weather delay was Michigan Stadium's first since 2011 against Western Michigan. The loss ended Michigan's 17-game winning streak against non-conference opponents at home, which dated back to 2008, and was Michigan's first loss at home in the month of September since 2007. Michigan's defense held Utah to three rushing yards in the first half. Jake Ryan led Michigan's defense with three tackles. Michigan's captains for the game were Anthony Capatina, Sione Houma, Jack Miller, and Mario Ojemudia.

=== Vs. Minnesota ===
Minnesota at Michigan
(Little Brown Jug)

Team	1	2	3	4	Total
• Golden Gophers	0	10	17	3	30
Wolverines	0	7	0	7	14

- Date: September 27
- Location: Michigan Stadium
  Ann Arbor, Michigan
- Game start: 3:35 p.m. EDT
- Elapsed time: 3:15
- Game attendance: 102,926
- Game weather: Mid 70s, Sunny, NE 15–20 MPH
- TV announcers (ABC/ESPN2): Mike Patrick, Ed Cunningham & Jeannine Edwards

Scoring summary
2	11:00	MICH	De'Veon Smith 10-yard run (Matt Wile kick)	MICH 7–0
2	8:00	MINN	Mitch Leidner 10-yard run (Ryan Santoso kick)	Tie 7–7
2	:00	MINN	Ryan Santoso 24-yard field goal	MINN 10–7
3	6:56	MINN	Ryan Santoso 48-yard field goal	MINN 13–7
3	6:42	MINN	De'Vondre Campbell 30-yard interception return (Ryan Santoso kick)	MINN 20–7
3	2:52	MINN	Maxx Williams 1-yard pass from Mitch Leidner (Ryan Santoso kick)	MINN 27–7
4	12:50	MINN	Ryan Santoso 25-yard field goal	MINN 30–7
4	7:27	MICH	Devin Gardner 3-yard run (Matt Wile kick)	MINN 30–14

After its game against Utah, Michigan faced the Minnesota Golden Gophers in its conference opener. In the previous meeting, Michigan dominated Minnesota and won by a score of 42–13.

Minnesota dominated Michigan, winning 30–14. After a scoreless first quarter, Michigan opened the scoring early in the second quarter via a 10-yard touchdown run from De'Veon Smith. Minnesota responded with a 10-yard touchdown run from Mitch Leidner and then took a 10–7 lead into halftime via a Ryan Santoso 24-yard field goal as time expired. In the third quarter, Minnesota extended its lead via a 48-yard field goal from Santoso, a 30-yard interception return for a touchdown from De'Vondre Campbell, and a one-yard touchdown pass from Leidner to Maxx Williams, which made the score 27–7 in favor of Minnesota after three quarters. Minnesota further extended its lead in the fourth quarter via a 25-yard field goal form Santoso before Michigan ended the scoring with a three-yard touchdown run from Devin Gardner.

The loss was Michigan's first to Minnesota since the 2005 season. Michigan also saw a streak of eight consecutive wins in Big Ten openers end. Minnesota outgained Michigan 373–171 in total yardage. Devin Funchess extended his streak of consecutive games with a reception to 18 games. Will Hagerup punted eight times for a total of 400 yards. The loss meant that for the first time in the 135-year history of Michigan football, a Michigan team had lost three games before the month of October.

During the game, Michigan quarterback Shane Morris suffered a concussion but stayed in for another play. After having been removed for one play, he was re-inserted for one play after Gardner lost his helmet and was forced to sit out a play. The Michigan coaching staff and training staff came under fire for not removing Morris immediately after he suffered the concussion. Michigan originally stated that Morris only had a high ankle sprain, but reversed course in a statement from athletic director Dave Brandon and admitted that Morris had indeed suffered a concussion. Following the release of the statement, students held a protest on campus calling for either the resignation or firing of Brandon for his role in both this situation and for other past actions.

=== At Rutgers ===
Michigan at Rutgers

Team	1	2	3	4	Total
Wolverines	3	14	0	7	24
• Scarlet Knights	6	13	0	7	26

- Date: October 4
- Location: High Point Solutions Stadium
  Piscataway, New Jersey
- Game start: 7:14 p.m. EDT
- Elapsed time: 3:24
- Game attendance: 53,327
- Game weather: 61°F, Clear, WNW 11 MPH
- Referee: Todd Geerlings
- TV announcers (BTN): Kevin Kugler, Glen Mason, Shaun O'Hara & Lisa Byington

Scoring summary
1	10:09	MICH	Matt Wile 39-yard field goal	MICH 3–0
1	7:29	RU	Kyle Federico 35-yard field goal	Tie 3–3
1	1:32	RU	Kyle Federico 45-yard field goal	RU 6–3
2	14:10	MICH	Devin Gardner 1-yard run (Matt Wile kick)	MICH 10–6
2	7:23	RU	Gary Nova 80-yard pass to Andrew Turzilli (Kick blocked)	RU 12–10
2	1:43	MICH	De'Veon Smith 4-yard run (Matt Wile kick)	MICH 17–12
2	:22	RU	Gary Nova 7-yard pass to John Tsimis (Kyle Federico kick)	RU 19–17
4	13:12	RU	Gary Nova 14-yard pass to Andrew Turzilli (Kyle Federico kick)	RU 26–17
4	9:17	MICH	Devin Gardner 19-yard run (Matt Wile kick)	RU 26–24

After facing Minnesota, Michigan traveled to New Jersey to face Rutgers, one of the newest members of the Big Ten Conference. This was the first meeting between the schools.

Rutgers defeated Michigan by a score of 26–24. Michigan opened the scoring in the first quarter with a 39-yard field goal from Matt Wile, but Rutgers responded with two Kyle Federico field goals (from 35 and 45 yards) to take a 6–3 lead. Michigan regained the lead in the second quarter via a Devin Gardner four-yard touchdown run, but Rutgers responded with an 80-yard touchdown pass from Gary Nova to Andrew Turzilli. The resulting extra point was blocked, giving Rutgers a 12–10 lead. Michigan regained the lead via a one-yard touchdown run from De'Veon Smith, but Rutgers responded shortly before halftime with a seven-yard touchdown pass from Nova to John Tsimis, which made the score 19–17 in favor of Rutgers at halftime. After a scoreless third quarter, Rutgers increased its lead to nine points via a 14-yard touchdown pass from Nova to Turzilli. Michigan responded with a 19-yard touchdown run from Devin Gardner but could not overcome the resulting two-point deficit.

Michigan fell to 0–2 in conference play for the first time since 1967. Rutgers became the only team in the Big Ten Conference to which Michigan has a losing record. Taco Charlton made the first start of his career. Devin Funchess has now recorded a reception in 19 consecutive games, while Jehu Chesson has caught a pass in eight consecutive games. Michigan's captains for the game were Devin Gardner, Jack Miller, Matt Wile, and Jarrod Wilson

=== Vs. Penn State ===
Penn State at Michigan

Team	1	2	3	4	Total
Nittany Lions	6	7	0	0	13
• Wolverines	7	3	3	5	18

- Date: October 11
- Location: Michigan Stadium
  Ann Arbor, Michigan
- Game start: 7:05 p.m. EDT
- Elapsed time: 3:15
- Game attendance: 113,085
- Game weather: Mid 50s, Clear and cool, NW 10–15 MPH
- Referee: Dave Witvoet
- TV announcers (ESPN2): Mark Jones, Rod Gilmore & Jessica Mendoza

Scoring summary
1	9:28	PSU	Sam Ficken 35-yard field goal	PSU 3–0
1	6:37	MICH	Devin Funchess 43-yard pass from Devin Gardner (Matt Wile kick)	MICH 7–3
1	:52	PSU	Sam Ficken 32-yard field goal	MICH 7–6
2	11:58	PSU	DaeSean Hamilton 10-yard pass from Christian Hackenberg (Sam Ficken kick)	PSU 13–7
2	5:08	MICH	Matt Wile 45-yard field goal	PSU 13–10
3	2:30	MICH	Matt Wile 42-yard field goal	Tie 13–13
4	11:24	MICH	Matt Wile 37-yard field goal	MICH 16–13
4	1:41	MICH	Team Safety	MICH 18–13

Following its game against Rutgers, Michigan returned to Ann Arbor to face the Penn State Nittany Lions. In the previous meeting, Penn State won by a score of 43–40 in quadruple overtime. The game was the first in-conference night game in Michigan Stadium's history.

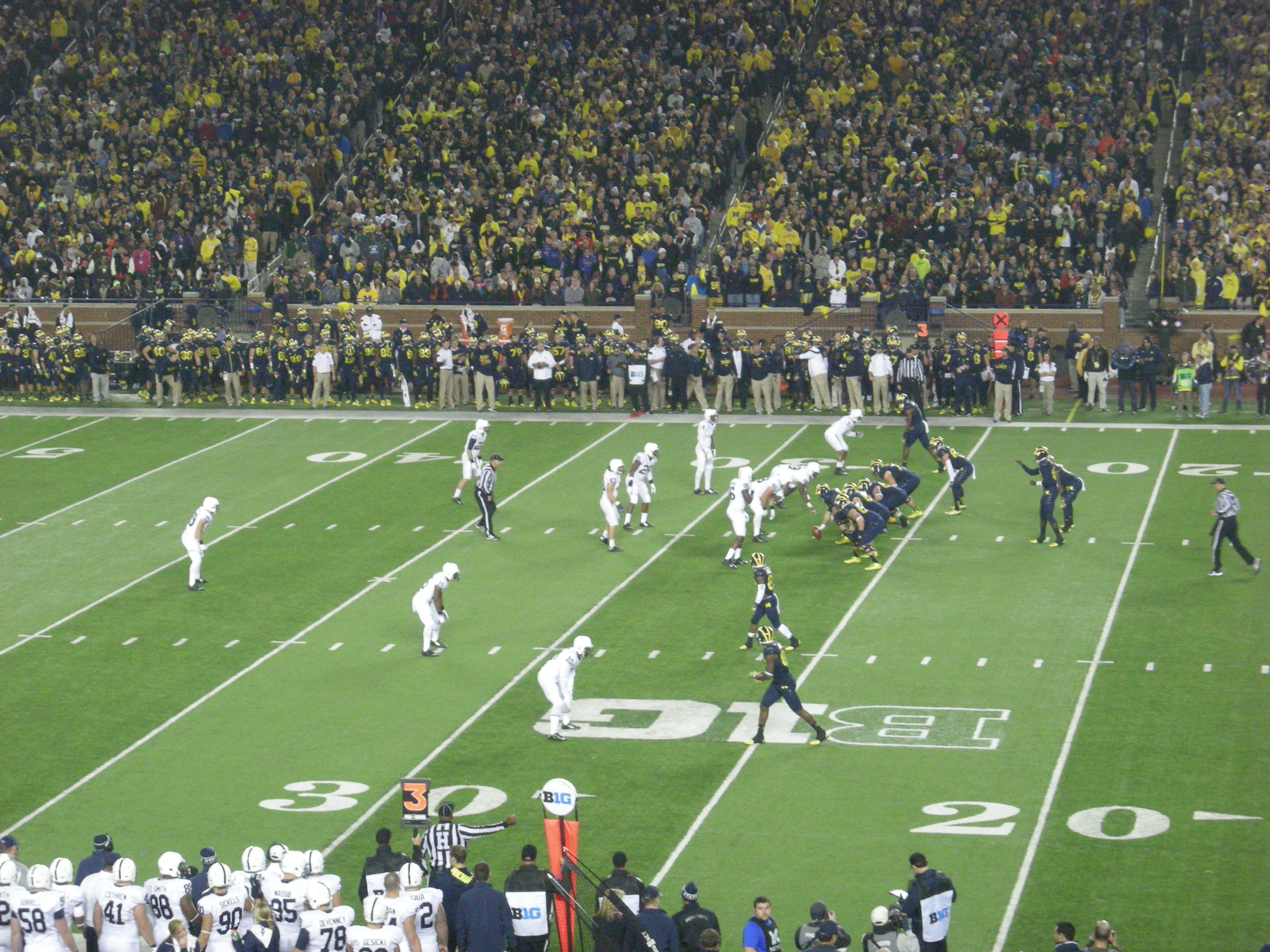
Michigan on offense during the game against Penn State

Michigan defeated Penn State by a score of 18–13. Penn State opened the scoring in the first quarter with a 35-yard field goal from Sam Ficken, but Michigan responded with a 43-yard touchdown pass from Devin Gardner to Devin Funchess. Penn State cut Michigan's lead to one point late in the first quarter with a 32-yard field goal from Ficken. Penn State took the lead in the second quarter via a ten-yard touchdown pass from Christian Hackenberg to DaeSean Hamilton, but Michigan responded with a 45-yard field goal from Matt Wile, making the score 13–10 in favor of Penn State at halftime. Michigan scored all of the points in the second half. Michigan tied the game in the third quarter via a 42-yard field goal from Wile and then took the lead in the fourth quarter via a 37-yard field goal from Wile, which gave Michigan a 16–13 lead. Michigan scored the final points of the game on a safety when Penn State deliberately committed a safety in order to attempt to regain better field position for a potential game-winning drive. Penn State appeared to recover the ensuing onside kick but a controversial offside penalty forced Penn State to re-kick and Michigan recovered the kickoff, which ended the game.

Michigan improved its record to 3–0 when playing night games at Michigan Stadium. Michigan improved to 16–16 in the red zone. For the fifth time this season, Michigan's defense held an opponent to under 100 yards rushing. Gardner passed both Tom Brady and Jim Harbaugh and moved into sixth place on Michigan's all-time passing yardage list with 5,543 yards. Matt Wile's three field goals marked a new career high for him in field goals made in one game. Dennis Norfleet set a Michigan record for overall kick return yardage, as he increased his total to 2,029 yards from kick returns. Michigan's six sacks were the most Michigan has recorded in a game since Michigan played Utah in 2008. The safety in the fourth quarter was Michigan's first since 2011 against Ohio State. Michigan's captains for the game were Justice Hayes, Joe Kerridge, Jake Ryan, and Jarrod Wilson.

=== At Michigan State ===
Michigan at Michigan State
(Paul Bunyan Trophy)

Team	1	2	3	4	Total
Wolverines	0	3	0	8	11
• #8 Spartans	7	7	14	7	35

- Date: October 25
- Location: Spartan Stadium
  East Lansing, Michigan
- Game start: 3:36 p.m. EDT
- Elapsed time: 3:17
- Game attendance: 76,331
- Game weather: 68°F, Sunny, W 20 MPH
- Referee: Dan Capron
- TV announcers (ABC): Sean McDonough, Chris Spielman & Todd McShay

Scoring summary
1	11:52	MSU	Jeremy Langford 2-yard run (Michael Geiger kick)	MSU 7–0
2	3:30	MICH	Matt Wile 48-yard field goal	MSU 7–3
2	:21	MSU	Jeremy Langford 1-yard run (Michael Geiger kick)	MSU 14–3
3	8:33	MSU	RJ Williamson 29-yard interception return (Michael Geiger kick)	MSU 21–3
3	6:17	MSU	Tony Lippett 70-yard pass from Connor Cook (Michael Geiger kick)	MSU 28–3
4	3:40	MICH	De'Veon Smith 1-yard run (Jake Butt pass from Devin Gardner)	MSU 28–11
4	:28	MSU	Jeremy Langford 5-yard run (Michael Geiger kick)	MSU 35–11

Following its clash with Penn State and a bye week, Michigan traveled to East Lansing to face its in-state rival, the Michigan State Spartans. This was the second straight year Michigan faces Michigan State at Michigan State. Michigan was dominated in the previous meeting, losing 29–6.

Michigan State dominated Michigan, winning 35–11. Michigan State opened the scoring in the first quarter with a two-yard touchdown run from Jeremy Langford. Michigan responded in the second quarter with a 48-yard field goal from Matt Wile, but Michigan State expanded its lead shortly before halftime with a one-yard touchdown run from Langford. In the third quarter, Michigan State expanded its lead via a 29-yard interception return for a touchdown from RJ Williamson and a 70-yard touchdown pass from Connor Cook to Tony Lippett. Michigan reduced Michigan State's lead to 11 points in the fourth quarter with a one-yard touchdown run from De'Veon Smith and a successful two-point conversion via a pass from Devin Gardner to Jake Butt, but Michigan State scored the final points of the game near the end of the fourth quarter via a five-yard touchdown run from Langford, his third of the game.

Michigan's captains for the game were Brennen Beyer, Gardner, Delote Hollowell, and Raymon Taylor. Wile's 48-yard field goal was a season long for him. Michigan's defense recovered two fumbles.

=== Vs. Indiana ===
Indiana at Michigan

Team	1	2	3	4	Total
Hoosiers	0	0	3	7	10
• Wolverines	10	7	7	10	34

- Date: November 1
- Location: Michigan Stadium
  Ann Arbor, Michigan
- Game start: 3:42 p.m. EDT
- Elapsed time: 2:53
- Game attendance: 103,111
- Game weather: Low 40s, Partly cloudy, N 20–30 MPH
- Referee: John O'Neill
- TV announcers (BTN): Kevin Kugler, Glen Mason & Lisa Byington

Scoring summary
1	8:20	MICH	Matt Wile 35-yard field goal	MICH 3–0
1	5:52	MICH	Keith Heitzman 6-yard pass from Devin Gardner (Matt Wile kick)	MICH 10–0
2	7:18	MICH	Amara Darboh 12-yard pass from Devin Gardner (Matt Wile kick)	MICH 17–0
3	8:31	IND	Griffin Oaks 38-yard field goal	MICH 17–3
3	1:39	MICH	Drake Johnson 10-yard run (Matt Wile kick)	MICH 24–3
4	3:40	MICH	Matt Wile 23-yard field goal	MICH 27–3
4	3:40	IND	D'Angelo Roberts 3-yard run (Griffin Oaks kick)	MICH 27–10
4	:28	MICH	Drake Johnson 16-yard run (Matt Wile kick)	MICH 34–10

After its trip to East Lansing, Michigan hosted the Indiana Hoosiers. This was the second meeting in a row played at Michigan Stadium between the two teams. Michigan won the previous meeting 63–47. Michigan announced prior to the game that tight end Jake Butt would be suspended for the game because of a violation of team rules.

Michigan dominated Indiana, winning 34–10. Michigan opened the scoring in the first quarter with a 35-yard field goal from Matt Wile and expanded its lead to ten points later in the first quarter via a six-yard touchdown pass from Devin Gardner to Keith Heitzman. Michigan added another touchdown in the second quarter via a 12-yard pass from Gardner to Amara Darboh, which made the score 17–0 in favor of Michigan at halftime. Indiana scored the first points of the third quarter via a 38-yard field goal from Griffin Oaks, but Michigan responded with a ten-yard touchdown run from Drake Johnson. Michigan expanded its lead to 20 via a 23-yard field goal from Matt Wile in the fourth quarter, Indiana cut Michigan's lead back to 17 points via a three-yard touchdown run from D'Angelo Roberts. Michigan scored the final points of the game via a 16-yard touchdown run from Johnson.

Michigan's captains for the game were Joe Bolden, Joe Kerridge, and Jarrod Wilson. Michigan has now won 19 consecutive games against Indiana, which dates back to 1988, and is also 12–1 against Indiana when facing Indiana as a homecoming opponent. Michigan improved its homecoming record to 87–27. Michigan's run defense held Indiana to 167 yards rushing; Indiana was averaging 289.9 yards per game on the ground prior to the game. Michigan's defense also only allowed 24 yards passing, which was the fewest allowed since Michigan allowed 15 passing yards against Rice in 1999. Heitzman's touchdown reception in the first quarter was his first career touchdown. Darboh set career highs for receptions (9) and yards (107), while Johnson set career highs in rushing attempts (16), yards (122), and touchdowns (2).

=== At Northwestern ===
Michigan at Northwestern

Team	1	2	3	4	Total
• Wolverines	0	0	7	3	10
Wildcats	0	0	0	9	9

- Date: November 8
- Location: Ryan Field
  Evanston, Illinois
- Game start: 3:35 p.m. EST
- Elapsed time: 3:12
- Game attendance: 42,429
- Game weather: 45°F, Partly sunny, WNW 18 MPH
- Referee: Ron Snodgrass
- TV announcers (ESPN2): Mike Patrick, Ed Cunningham & Jeannine Edwards

Scoring summary
3	6:49	MICH	De'Veon Smith 3-yard run (Matt Wile kick)	MICH 7–0
4	7:26	NW	Jack Mitchell 21-yard field goal	MICH 7–3
4	3:10	MICH	Matt Wile 37-yard field goal	MICH 10–3
4	:03	NW	Tony Jones 3-yard pass from Trevor Siemian (Two-point conversion failed)	MICH 10–9

Following its game against Indiana, Michigan traveled to Evanston for the second consecutive year to face the Northwestern Wildcats. Michigan won the previous meeting 27–19 in triple overtime.

Michigan won a turnover filled game 10–9, stopping Northwestern's attempted go-ahead two-point conversion with three seconds remaining in the game. After a turnover filled first half during which Michigan had a field goal attempt blocked, Michigan opened the scoring in the third quarter with a three-yard touchdown run from De'Veon Smith. Northwestern reduced Michigan's lead to four points in the fourth quarter with a 21-yard field goal from Jack Mitchell, but Michigan regained its seven-point lead with a 37-yard field goal from Matt Wile. Northwestern responded with a three-yard touchdown pass from Trevor Siemian to Toby Jones with three seconds remaining in the game, but the ensuing two-point conversion in an attempt to win the game in regulation was unsuccessful when Frank Clark's pressure caused Trevor Siemian to slip on the wet grass. Michigan recovered the ensuing onside kick and won the game.

Michigan's captains for the game were Brennen Beyer, Blake Countess, Amara Darboh, and Jack Miller. Michigan held Northwestern to a total of 12 rushing yards. Jake Ryan recorded his first career interception during the game. Michigan won its fourth game in a row against Northwestern.

The game is often remembered in infamy as the "M00N game," referencing the display on the scoreboard at halftime.

=== Vs. Maryland ===
Maryland at Michigan

Team	1	2	3	4	Total
• Terrapins	0	9	0	14	23
Wolverines	3	6	7	0	16

- Date: November 22
- Location: Michigan Stadium
  Ann Arbor, Michigan
- Game start: 3:42 p.m. EST
- Elapsed time: 3:02
- Game attendance: 101,717
- Game weather: Mid 40s, Overcast and misty, SW 10–20 MPH
- Referee: Mike Cannon
- TV announcers (BTN): Eric Collins & Chuck Long

Scoring summary
1	9:35	MICH	Matt Wile 23-yard field goal	MICH 3–0
2	13:39	MD	Matt Wile 23-yard field goal	Tie 3–3
2	7:41	MICH	Matt Wile 23-yard field goal	MICH 6–3
2	3:32	MD	Griffin Oaks 38-yard field goal	Tie 6–6
2	1:50	MICH	Matt Wile 23-yard field goal	MD 9–6
2	:00	MICH	Matt Wile 23-yard field goal	Tie 9–9
3	10:25	MICH	Devin Gardner 15-yard run (Matt Wile kick)	MICH 16–9
4	14:47	MD	C.J. Brown 8-yard run (Griffin Oaks kick)	Tie 16–16
4	5:59	MD	Wes Brown 1-yard run (Brad Craddock kick)	MD 23–16

After its game against Northwestern and another bye week, Michigan played its final home game of the season against Maryland, one of the newest members of the Big Ten Conference. This was the first meeting between the schools since 1990, which Michigan won 45–17.

Maryland defeated Michigan, winning 23–16. The teams traded field goals throughout the first half. Michigan opened the scoring in the first quarter with a 22-yard field goal from Matt Wile. Maryland responded in the second quarter with a 38-yard field goal from Brad Craddock. Michigan regained the lead with a 33-yard field goal from Wile, but Maryland tied the game with a 41-yard field goal from Craddock and gained the lead with a 21-yard field goal from Craddock. Michigan tied the game as time expired in the first half with a 26-yard field goal from Wile, which made the score 9–9 at halftime. Michigan regained the lead in the third quarter via a 15-yard touchdown run from Devin Gardner, but Maryland tied the game in the fourth quarter via an eight-yard touchdown run from C.J. Brown and then took the lead for good with a one-yard touchdown run from Wes Brown.

Michigan's streak of consecutive games with over 100,000 was extended to 258, but it was Michigan's lowest attended game since the game against Memphis in 1995. Michigan's captains were Brennen Beyer, Gardner, Jake Ryan, and Raymon Taylor. Michigan held its opponent without a score in the first quarter for the third consecutive game. Joe Bolden and Ryan both set career highs with 14 tackles each. Joe Kerridge set a career long rush of 52 yards during a successful fake punt attempt in the first quarter.

=== At Ohio State ===
Michigan at Ohio State
(The Game)

Team	1	2	3	4	Total
Wolverines	7	7	7	7	28
• #7 Buckeyes	7	7	14	14	42

- Date: November 29
- Location: Ohio Stadium
  Columbus, Ohio
- Game start: 12:06 p.m. EST
- Elapsed time: 3:29
- Game attendance: 108,610
- Game weather: 41°F, Partly sunny, S 12 MPH
- Referee: John O'Neill
- TV announcers (ABC): Dave Pasch, Brian Griese & Tom Luginbill

Scoring summary
1	11:34	OSU	Nick Vannett 6-yard pass from J. T. Barrett (Sean Nuernberger kick)	OSU 7–0
1	2:42	MICH	Jake Butt 12-yard pass from Devin Gardner (Matt Wile kick)	Tie 7–7
2	7:34	MICH	Drake Johnson 2-yard run (Matt Wile kick)	MICH 14–7
2	:07	OSU	J. T. Barrett 25-yard run (Sean Nuernberger kick)	Tie 14–14
3	12:59	OSU	J. T. Barrett 2-yard run (Sean Nuernberger kick)	OSU 21–14
3	7:41	MICH	Drake Johnson 4-yard run (Matt Wile kick)	Tie 21–21
3	1:08	OSU	Ezekiel Elliott 2-yard run (Sean Nuernberger kick)	OSU 28–21
4	4:58	OSU	Ezekiel Elliott 44-yard run (Sean Nuernberger kick)	OSU 35–21
4	3:58	OSU	Darron Lee 33-yard fumble return (Sean Nuernberger kick)	OSU 42–21
4	1:15	MICH	Freddy Canteen 3-yard pass from Devin Gardner (Matt Wile kick)	OSU 42–28

To end the regular season, Michigan faced its arch-rival Ohio State in the 111th meeting of "The Game". Ohio State won the previous edition 42–41, with Michigan missing a two-point conversion attempt that would have made the score 43–42 in favor of Michigan with 32 seconds remaining in the game.

Ohio State defeated Michigan to record its third consecutive victory over the Wolverines, winning 42–28. Ohio State opened the scoring in the first quarter with a six-yard touchdown pass from J. T. Barrett to Nick Vannett. Michigan responded with a 12-yard touchdown pass from Devin Gardner to Jake Butt and then took the lead in the second quarter via a two-yard touchdown run from Drake Johnson. Ohio State tied the game seven seconds before halftime via a 25-yard touchdown run from Barrett, which made the score 14–14 at halftime. Ohio State regained the lead in the third quarter via a two-yard touchdown run from Barrett, but Michigan responded with a four-yard touchdown run from Drake Johnson. Ohio State took the lead for good via a two-yard touchdown run from Ezekiel Elliott shortly before the end of the third quarter. In the fourth quarter, Ohio State added to its lead via a 44-yard touchdown run from Elliott and a 33-yard fumble return for a touchdown from Darron Lee. Michigan reduced Ohio State's margin of victory to 14 points via a three-yard touchdown pass from Gardner to Freddy Canteen.

Devin Funchess recorded a reception for the 25th straight game. Mason Cole became the first true freshman since 2009 to start all twelve games for Michigan and became the most started true freshman offensive lineman in program history. The captains for the game were Joe Bolden, Jack Miller, Jake Ryan, and Jarrod Wilson.

== Depth chart ==
Starters and backups against Appalachian State.

Defense

FS
Jarrod Wilson
AJ Pearson
⋅

WLB	MLB	SLB
Joe Bolden	Jake Ryan	Royce Jenkins-Stone
Desmond Morgan	Desmond Morgan	James Ross III
Ben Gedeon	Mike McCray	Allen Gant

SS
Jeremy Clark
Dymonte Thomas
⋅

CB
Blake Countess
Channing Stribling
⋅

DE	DT	DT	DE
Brennen Beyer	Ryan Glasgow	Willie Henry	Frank Clark
Taco Charlton	Ondre Pipkins	Matt Godin	Mario Ojemudia
⋅	⋅	⋅	⋅

CB
Raymon Taylor
Jourdan Lewis
⋅

Offense

WR
Devin Funchess
Amara Darboh
⋅

LT	LG	C	RG	RT
Mason Cole	Erik Magnuson	Jack Miller	Joey Burzynski	Ben Braden
Erik Magnuson	Kyle Bosch	Patrick Kugler	Kyle Kalis	Logan Tuley-Tillman
⋅	⋅	⋅	⋅	⋅

TE
A.J. Williams
Khalid Hill
⋅

WR
Jehu Chesson
Freddy Canteen
⋅

QB
Devin Gardner
Shane Morris
⋅

RB
Derrick Green
De'Veon Smith
Justice Hayes

FB
Joe Kerridge
Sione Houma
⋅

Special teams
PK Matt Wile
PK Kenny Allen
P Will Hagerup
KR Dennis Norfleet/Justice Hayes
PR Jabrill Peppers
LS Scott Sypniewski
H Kenny Allen

== 2015 NFL draft ==
Three Wolverines were drafted in the 2015 NFL Draft. Devin Gardner signed as an undrafted free agent with the New England Patriots.

Rnd.	Pick No.	NFL team	Player	Pos.	College	Conf.	Notes
2	41	Carolina Panthers	Devin Funchess	WR	Michigan	Big Ten	from St. Louis
2	63	Seattle Seahawks	Frank Clark	DE	Michigan	Big Ten	
4	129	Green Bay Packers	Jake Ryan	OLB	Michigan	Big Ten	

== Roster ==
2014 Michigan Wolverines football team roster
Players
Coaches
Offense

Pos.	#	Name	Class
WR	1	Devin Funchess	Jr
WR	3	Bo Dever	RFr
RB	4	De'Veon Smith	So
RB	5	Justice Hayes	Jr
QB	6	Brian Cleary	So
QB	7	Shane Morris	So
QB	8	Russell Bellomy	Jr
WR	10	Da'Mario Jones	RFr
QB	13	Alex Swieca	Jr
WR	14	Drake Harris	Fr
QB	15	Garrett Moores	RFr
WR	16	Jack Wangler	RFr
WR	17	Freddy Canteen	Fr
RB	18	Antonio Whitfield	So
QB	19	Wilton Speight	Fr
RB	20	Drake Johnson	So
RB	23	Dennis Norfleet	Jr
RB	27	Derrick Green	So
RB	29	Ross Douglas	RFr
RB	32	Ty Isaac	So
RB	33	Wyatt Shallman	RFr
FB	36	Joe Kerridge	Jr
FB	37	Bobby Henderson	So
FB	39	Sione Houma	Jr
WR	41	Anthony Capatina	Sr
TE	42	Dylan Esterline	Sr
TE	46	Clark Grace	So
WR	49	Brad Anlauf	So
RB	51	Greg Froelich	RFr
OL	52	Mason Cole	Fr
OL	55	David Dawson	RFr
OL	56	Joey Burzynski	Sr
OL	57	Patrick Kugler	RFr
OL	58	Chris Bryant	Jr
OL	60	Jack Miller	Jr
OL	61	Graham Glasgow	Jr
OL	62	Blake Bars	So
OL	63	Ben Pliska	So
OL	65	Kyle Bosch	So
OL	66	Dan Liesman	So
OL	67	Kyle Kalis	RSo
OL	71	Ben Braden	So
OL	72	Logan Tuley-Tillman	RFr
OL	73	Chris Fox	RFr
OL	74	Dan Samuelson	RFr
OL	76	Juwann Bushell-Beatty	Fr
OL	78	Erik Magnuson	So
TE	80	Khalid Hill	RFr
WR	82	Amara Darboh	Jr
WR	83	Jaron Dukes	RFr
TE	84	A.J. Williams	Jr
WR	85	Maurice Ways	Fr
WR	86	Jehu Chesson	So
TE	88	Jake Butt	So
WR	89	Jonathan Keizer	Jr
TE	91	Alex Mitropoulos-Rundus	Jr
TE	92	Keith Heitzman	Jr
TE	94	Ian Bunting	Fr
TE	95	Michael Jocz	So
QB	98	Devin Gardner	Sr

Defense

Pos.	#	Name	Class
DB	2	Blake Countess	RJr
DB	5	Jabrill Peppers	Fr
DB	6	Raymon Taylor	Sr
DT	7	Henry Poggi	RFr
DB	8	Channing Stribling	So
LB	9	Mike McCray	RFr
DB	12	Allen Gant	So
CB	13	Terry Richardson	Jr
LB	15	James Ross	Jr
LB	19	Jared Wangler	Fr
S	22	Jarrod Wilson	Jr
DB	24	Delonte Hollowell	Sr
S	25	Dymonte Thomas	So
DB	26	Jourdan Lewis	So
DB	28	Brandon Watson	Fr
DB	30	Reon Dawson	RFr
LB	30	Nick Benda	So
S	32	Shaun Austin	So
DE	33	Taco Charlton	So
S	34	Jeremy Clark	So
LB	35	Joe Bolden	Jr
DB	36	AJ Pearson	So
DB	38	Francois Montbrun	Fr
LB	42	Ben Gedeon	So
DE	43	Chris Wormley	So
DB	44	Delano Hill	So
DB	46	Joe Hewlett	Fr
LB	51	Michael Ferns	Fr
LB	47	Jake Ryan	RSr
LB	48	Desmond Morgan	Sr
CB	49	Anthony Dalimonte	RFr
DE	50	Tom Strobel	So
LB	52	Royce Jenkins-Stone	Jr
DE	53	Mario Ojemudia	Jr
DT	54	Brady Pallante	Fr
DL	55	Garrett Miller	RFr
DT	56	Ondre Pipkins	Jr
LB	57	Frank Clark	Sr
LB	58	Chase Winovich	Fr
LB	59	Noah Furbush	Fr
LB	64	Michael Wroblewski	Fr
LB	66	Dan Liesman	So
DT	69	Willie Henry	So
DT	73	Maurice Hurst Jr.	RFr
DT	90	Bryan Mone	Fr
DE	93	Lawrence Marshall	Fr
DL	96	Ryan Glasgow	So
DE	97	Brennen Beyer	Sr
DE	99	Matt Godin	So

Special teams

Pos.	#	Name	Class
P	40	Will Hagerup	RSr
LS	43	Scott Sypniewski	RFr
PK	45	Matt Wile	Sr
P	91	Kenneth Allen	So

Head coach

- Brady Hoke

Coordinators/assistant coaches

- Doug Nussmeier (Offensive coordinator / quarterbacks)
- Greg Mattison (Defensive coordinator / linebackers)
- Dan Ferrigno (Tight ends / special teams)
- Darrell Funk (Offensive line)
- Jeff Hecklinski (Wide receivers)
- Fred Jackson (Running backs)
- Curt Mallory (Safeties)
- Roy Manning (Cornerbacks)
- Mark Smith (Defensive line)
- Kevin Koger (Offensive graduate assistant)
- Michael Switzer (Offensive graduate assistant)
- Jerry Milling (Defensive graduate assistant)
- Aaron Wellman (Strength and conditioning)
- John Van Dam (Offensive quality control assistant)

Legend

- (C) Team captain
- (S) Suspended
- (I) Ineligible
- Injured
- Redshirt

Roster
Last update: December 31, 2014
