= Taco Charlton =

American football player (born 1994)

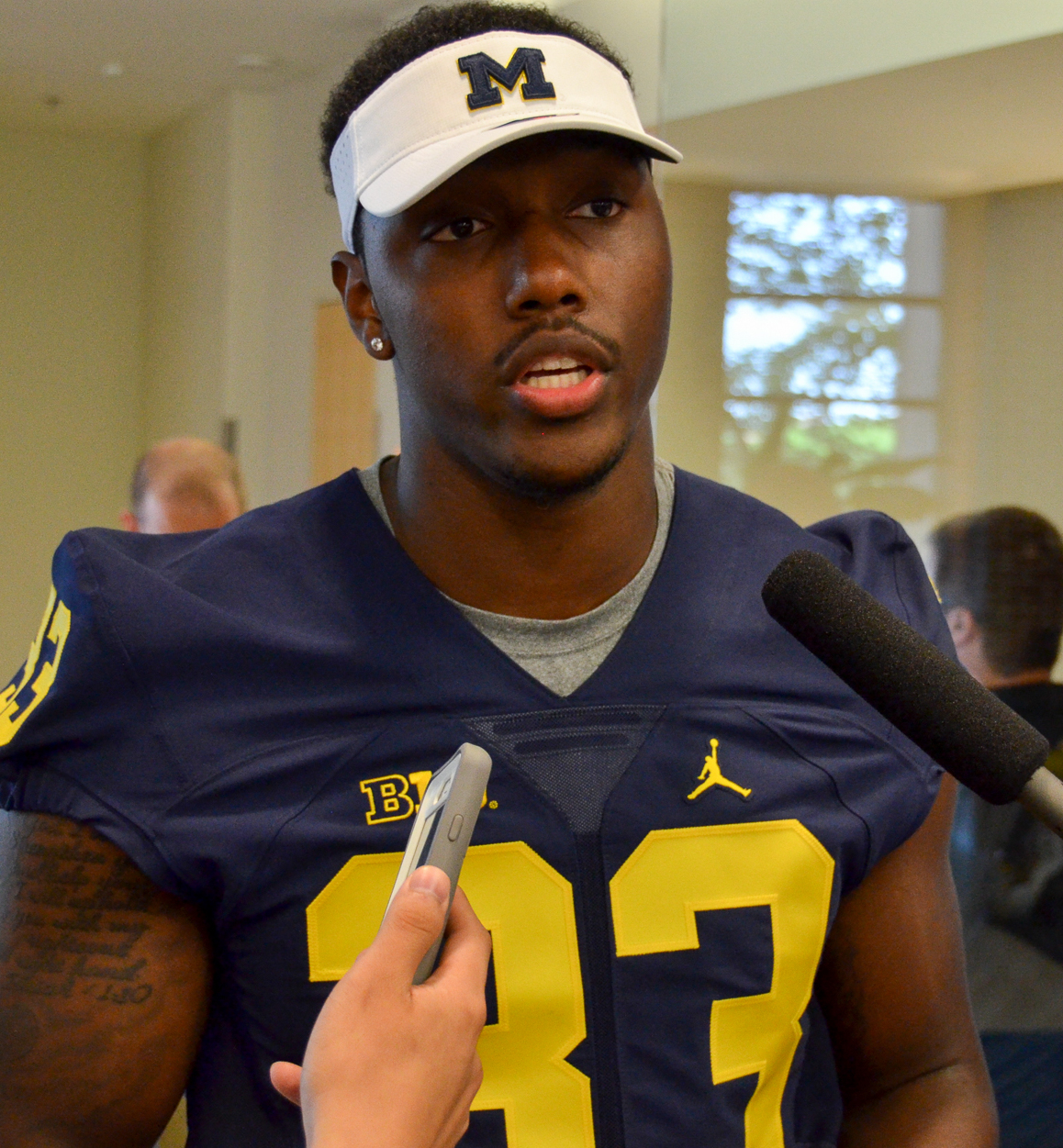
- Charlton during his time at Michigan in 2016

Profile
- Position: Defensive end

Personal information
- Born: November 7, 1994 (age 32); Columbus, Ohio, U.S.
- Listed height: 6 ft 6 in (1.98 m)
- Listed weight: 277 lb (126 kg)

Career information
- High school: Pickerington Central (Pickerington, Ohio)
- College: Michigan (2013–2016)
- NFL draft: 2017: 1st round, 28th overall pick

Career history
- Dallas Cowboys (2017–2019); Miami Dolphins (2019); Kansas City Chiefs (2020); Pittsburgh Steelers (2021); New Orleans Saints (2022)*; Chicago Bears (2022); Jacksonville Jaguars (2022)*; San Francisco 49ers (2023)*; Birmingham Stallions (2024); Arlington / Dallas Renegades (2025–2026)
- * Offseason or practice squad member only

Awards and highlights
- UFL champion (2024); First-team All-Big Ten (2016)

Career NFL statistics
- Total tackles: 95
- Sacks: 11.5
- Forced fumbles: 4
- Fumble recoveries: 1
- Pass deflections: 3
- Stats at Pro Football Reference

Vidauntae "Taco" Charlton (born November 7, 1994) is an American professional football defensive end. He played college football at Michigan and was selected by the Dallas Cowboys in the first round of the 2017 NFL draft. He has also been a member of the Miami Dolphins, Kansas City Chiefs, Pittsburgh Steelers, New Orleans Saints, Chicago Bears, Jacksonville Jaguars, and San Francisco 49ers. He won a championship with the Stallions in his first year in the UFL.

== Early life ==
Charlton was born at the Ohio State University Wexner Medical Center two months prematurely. His nickname derived from the fact that to try to keep his mother from going into labor early, his grandmother would speak to her daughter's baby bump and tell him "you had best not make a run for the border", referencing the Taco Bell advertising slogan.

He attended Pickerington High School Central in Pickerington, Ohio. He played as a defensive end, outside linebacker and tight end. As a sophomore, he collected 35 tackles and 8 pass breakups.

As a senior, he was a two-way player, registering 116 tackles (24 for loss) and 19 sacks, while receiving Division I All-Ohio honors. He committed to the University of Michigan to play college football as a four-star recruit.

In addition, Charlton also played basketball in high school alongside future NBA players Caris LeVert, Jae'Sean Tate and Javon Bess.

== College career ==
Charlton accepted a football scholarship from the University of Michigan. As a true freshman in 2013, he appeared in 10 games as a backup defensive end, playing mostly on special teams, while compiling two defensive tackles (half for a loss). As a sophomore in 2014, he appeared in 12 games with one start, making 19 tackles (5.5 for loss), 3.5 sacks and three quarterback hurries.

As a junior in 2015, he was defensive end in a 3-4 defense, appearing in 13 games with three starts, while recording 30 tackles (8.5 for loss), 5.5 sacks, three quarterback hurries and one forced fumble.

As a senior in 2016, he became a starter at right defensive end in a 4-3 defense. He suffered a high ankle sprain in the season opener and was forced to miss the next two games. He returned in the fourth game against Penn State University, posting three tackles (two for loss) and 1.5 sacks. He had three tackles and two sacks against Rutgers University. He made nine tackles (three for loss) and 2.5 sacks against Ohio State University. He finished with 43 tackles (13 for loss), two pass breakups and led the team with 9.5 sacks (tenth in school history). He was also named to the All-Big Ten Conference defensive first-team, by both the coaches and media.

=== College statistics ===
Season	Team	GP	Defense				
Season	Team	GP	Tackles	Loss	Sacks	Int	FF
2013	Michigan	2	2	0.5	0.0	0	0
2014	Michigan	9	19	5.5	3.5	0	0
2015	Michigan	11	30	8.5	5.5	0	1
2016	Michigan	11	40	13.5	10.0	0	0
Total		33	91	28.0	19.0	0	1

== Professional career ==
=== Pre-draft ===
Coming out of Michigan, Charlton was projected by the majority of NFL draft experts and analysts to be a first round pick. He received an invitation to the NFL Combine and completed all required combine and positional drills. On March 24, 2017, he attended Michigan's Pro Day, along with Jake Butt, Jabrill Peppers, Jehu Chesson, Jeremy Clark, Amara Darboh, Ben Gedeon, Ryan Glasgow, Lano Hill, Jourdan Lewis, Chris Wormley, De'Veon Smith, Channing Stribling, and seven other prospects.

He opted to run the 40 (4.86), 20 (2.80), and 10-yard dashes (1.63) again and was able to slightly cut times in all three while also running positional drills. Among the team representatives and scouts from all 32 NFL teams that attended Michigan's highly publicized pro day were eight head coaches: Mike Tomlin (Pittsburgh Steelers), Marvin Lewis (Cincinnati Bengals), Bill Belichick (New England Patriots), Todd Bowles (New York Jets), Sean Payton (New Orleans Saints), John Harbaugh (Baltimore Ravens), Mike Mularkey (Tennessee Titans), and Jim Caldwell (Detroit Lions). He was ranked the sixth best edge rusher in the draft by Sports Illustrated, was ranked the sixth best defensive end by ESPN, and was ranked the seventh best edge rusher by Pro Football Focus.

Pre-draft measurables
Height	Weight	Arm length	Hand span	Wingspan	40-yard dash	10-yard split	20-yard split	20-yard shuttle	Three-cone drill	Vertical jump	Broad jump	Bench press
6 ft 5 5/8 in (1.97 m)	277 lb (126 kg)	34 1/4 in (0.87 m)	9 3/4 in (0.25 m)	6 ft 9 7/8 in (2.08 m)	4.86 s	1.63 s	2.80 s	4.39 s	7.17 s	33 in (0.84 m)	9 ft 8 in (2.95 m)	25 reps
All value from NFL Combine/Pro Day

=== Dallas Cowboys ===
==== 2017 ====
Charlton was selected by the Dallas Cowboys in the first round (28th overall) of the 2017 NFL draft. He was the seventh defensive end selected and the second of eleven players drafted from Michigan.

On May 11, 2017, the Cowboys signed Charlton to a four-year, $10.02 million contract that includes $7.73 million guaranteed and a signing bonus of $5.43 million. He competed with Benson Mayowa, Charles Tapper, and Damontre Moore throughout training camp for a backup defensive end position. The coaching staff named Charlton the backup left defensive end behind DeMarcus Lawrence, who went on to have a breakout season and tied for second in the league with 14.5 sacks.

Charlton made his regular season debut in the Dallas Cowboys' season-opener against the New York Giants and finished without any statistic in the 19–3 victory. The following game, he made his first career tackle during the Cowboys' 17–42 loss to the Denver Broncos. He started the season slow, remaining a backup behind DeMarcus Lawrence and Tyrone Crawford. He recorded his first career sack against the Kansas City Chiefs. In the twelfth game against the Washington Redskins, he had two tackles, one sack and one forced fumble. He played sparingly as a backup, appearing in 16 games, while posting 19 tackles (one for loss), one pass defended, one forced fumble, 11 quarterback hurries and three sacks, with two of them coming in the last nine games.

==== 2018 ====
In 2018, he had to compete for playing time against Tyrone Crawford, Randy Gregory and Dorance Armstrong. He came up with the nickname "Hot Boyz" for the defensive line. It was also portrayed in the media that he started falling out of favor with the defensive coaching staff.

He started the first seven games at right defensive end opposite of DeMarcus Lawrence and was substituted in passing downs. He had a sack in Week 2 against the Giants. He suffered a shoulder injury in the eighth game against the Tennessee Titans, that forced him to miss five of the next six contests. His involvement was limited in the Cowboys' two playoff games, playing only 27 total snaps.

Charlton registered 27 tackles, four tackles for loss (tied for third on the team), one sack, four quarterback hurries, and one fumble recovery. He appeared in 11 games (seven starts), missing five contests because of a shoulder injury that required offseason surgery, and he also had an ankle surgery.

==== 2019 ====
In 2019, he entered training camp with his roster spot in jeopardy, even though Randy Gregory was suspended indefinitely and there were injuries among the defensive ends. The media reported about a meeting he had with defensive coordinator Rod Marinelli in the offseason, about concerns with his development.

In the preseason, his playing time increased by taking advantage of injuries to defensive ends DeMarcus Lawrence, Tyrone Crawford and Robert Quinn. He had solid performances, with the best one coming in the third game against the Houston Texans, where he registered three tackles, two sacks, two quarterback hurries, one pass defensed, two forced fumbles and one fumble recovery. His big night was dampened by injury, leaving the contest on two occasions because of knee and ankle injuries.

Charlton was a healthy scratch for the first two games of the season, fueling speculation in the media about his future with the Cowboys. It also didn't help that Charlton showed his displeasure through social media. He tweeted the message "free me" on September 15.

On September 18, 2019, two weeks into the season, Charlton was released by the team to make room to activate suspended defensive end Quinn, after the team failed to find a trade partner. His tenure with the Cowboys was one of the shortest for a first-round draft choice in franchise history, that didn't involve a career-ending injury.

=== Miami Dolphins ===
On September 19, 2019, Charlton was claimed off waivers by the Miami Dolphins. Charlton made his debut with the Dolphins in Week 3 against his former team, the Cowboys. In the game, Charlton recorded two tackles and one sack as the Dolphins lost 31–6. In Week 4 against the Los Angeles Chargers, Charlton recorded six tackles and a sack on Philip Rivers in the 30–10 loss. Although he started five games and finished as the team's leader with 5 sacks, he was declared inactive in four contests, including three of the last four games. He finished with 21 tackles (14 solo), five sacks and two forced fumbles.

On April 30, 2020, Charlton was waived, after facing competition from 5 new defensive ends, that the Dolphins acquired through free agency and the 2020 NFL draft.

=== Kansas City Chiefs ===
Charlton signed with the Kansas City Chiefs on May 4, 2020. In Week 2 against the Chargers, Charlton recorded his first sack as a Chief during the 23–20 win. In Week 4 against the Patriots, Charlton forced a key fumble on Brian Hoyer to keep the Patriots from scoring during the 26–10 win. He suffered an LCL sprain in the sixth game against the Buffalo Bills, forcing him to miss the next contest. He suffered a fractured ankle in the ninth game against the Carolina Panthers. He was placed on injured reserve on November 21, 2020. He was used as a situational pass-rusher, because he struggled defending against the run. He appeared in 7 games, making 7 tackles, 2 sacks and 4 quarterback hurries. He was declared inactive in 2 contests.

Charlton re-signed with the Chiefs on March 22, 2021. He was released by the Chiefs on August 23, 2021.

=== Pittsburgh Steelers ===
Charlton was signed to the practice squad of the Pittsburgh Steelers on September 21, 2021. He was promoted to the active roster on November 2. Charlton appeared in 11 games for the Steelers.

=== New Orleans Saints ===
Charlton signed with the New Orleans Saints on April 4, 2022. He was released by the Saints on August 30, and was re-signed to the team's practice squad the following day.

=== Chicago Bears ===
On November 16, 2022, the Chicago Bears signed Charlton off the New Orleans Saints practice squad to the active roster. He was waived by Chicago on December 28.

=== Jacksonville Jaguars ===
On January 2, 2023, the Jacksonville Jaguars signed Charlton to their practice squad. His practice squad contract with the team expired after the season on January 21.

=== San Francisco 49ers ===
On August 1, 2023, Charlton signed with the San Francisco 49ers. On August 19, the 49ers placed him on injured reserve. Charlton was released with an injury settlement on August 26.

=== Birmingham Stallions ===
On March 19, 2024, Charlton signed with the Birmingham Stallions of the United Football League (UFL).

=== Arlington / Dallas Renegades ===
On April 16, 2025, Charlton signed with the Arlington Renegades of the United Football League (UFL).

On January 14, 2026, Charlton was drafted by the Dallas Renegades.
