= Ondre Pipkins =

American football player (born 1994)

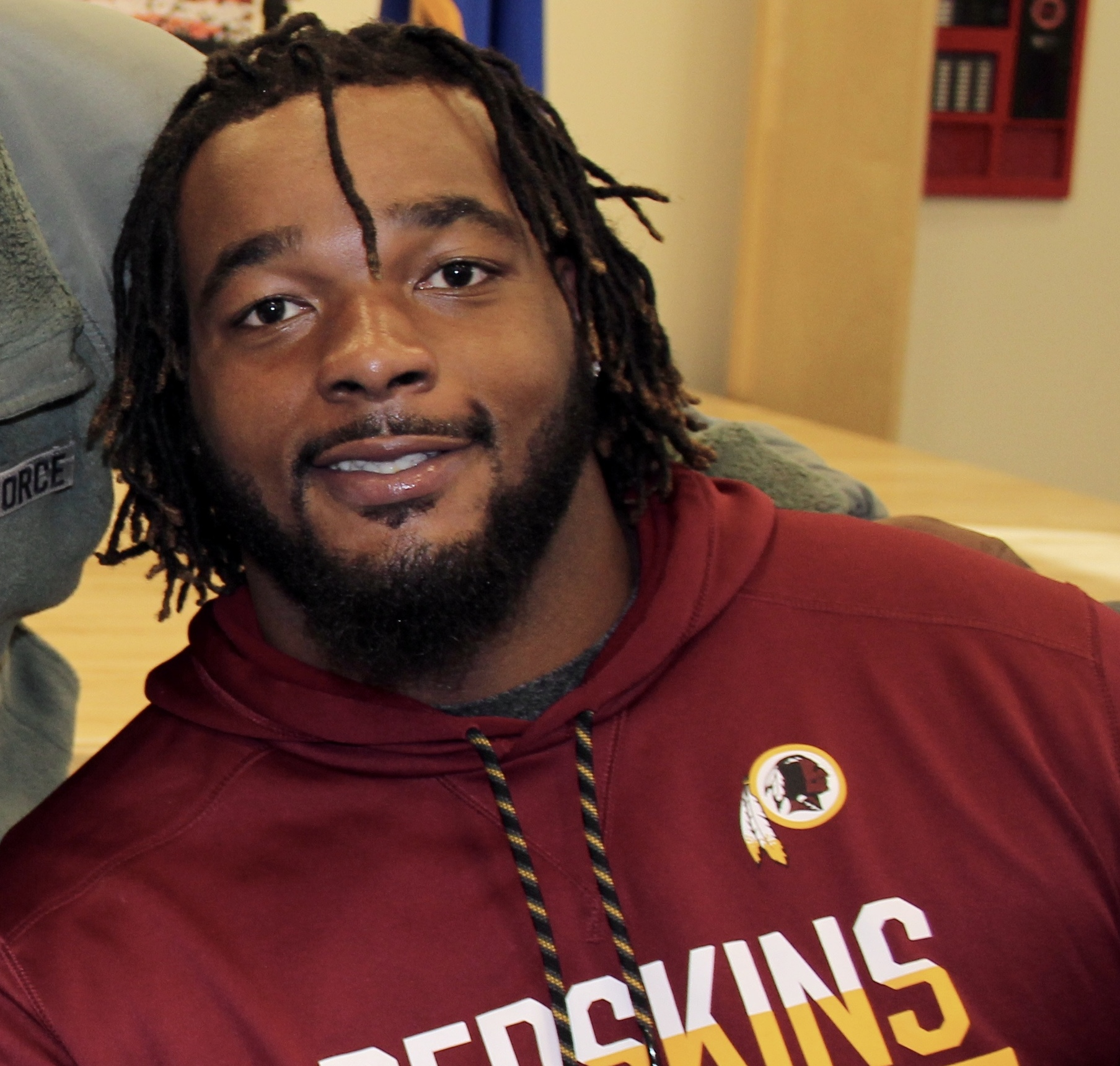

No. 73
- Position: Defensive end

Personal information
- Born: February 25, 1994 (age 32); Saginaw, Michigan
- Listed height: 6 ft 3 in (1.91 m)
- Listed weight: 315 lb (143 kg)

Career information
- High school: Kansas City (MO) Park Hill
- College: Texas Tech
- NFL draft: 2017: undrafted

Career history
- Washington Redskins (2017–2018)*; Arizona Hotshots (2019)*; Philadelphia Soul (2019)*
- * Offseason or practice squad member only
- Stats at Pro Football Reference

Ondre Pipkins (born February 25, 1994) is an American former football defensive end. He played college football at Texas Tech. He signed by the Washington Redskins as an undrafted free agent in 2017.

== Early life ==
A native of Saginaw, Michigan, Pipkins grew up idolizing Saginaw High School players LaMarr Woodley, Charles Rogers, Roy Manning, and Anthony Roberson. His father, Al Pipkins, was an assistant coach at Saginaw. At the age of six, Pipkins moved to Atlanta, Georgia. He later returned to Michigan, spending his freshman high school season at Rochester Adams High School, before attending Park Hill High School in Kansas City, Missouri, for his remaining three years.

At Park Hill, Pipkins was an All-American defensive lineman. Regarded as a five-star recruit by Rivals.com, Pipkins was listed as the third best defensive tackle in his class. In January 2012, he was rated by Rivals as 14th in its ranking of the Top 100 recruits in the country.

== College career ==
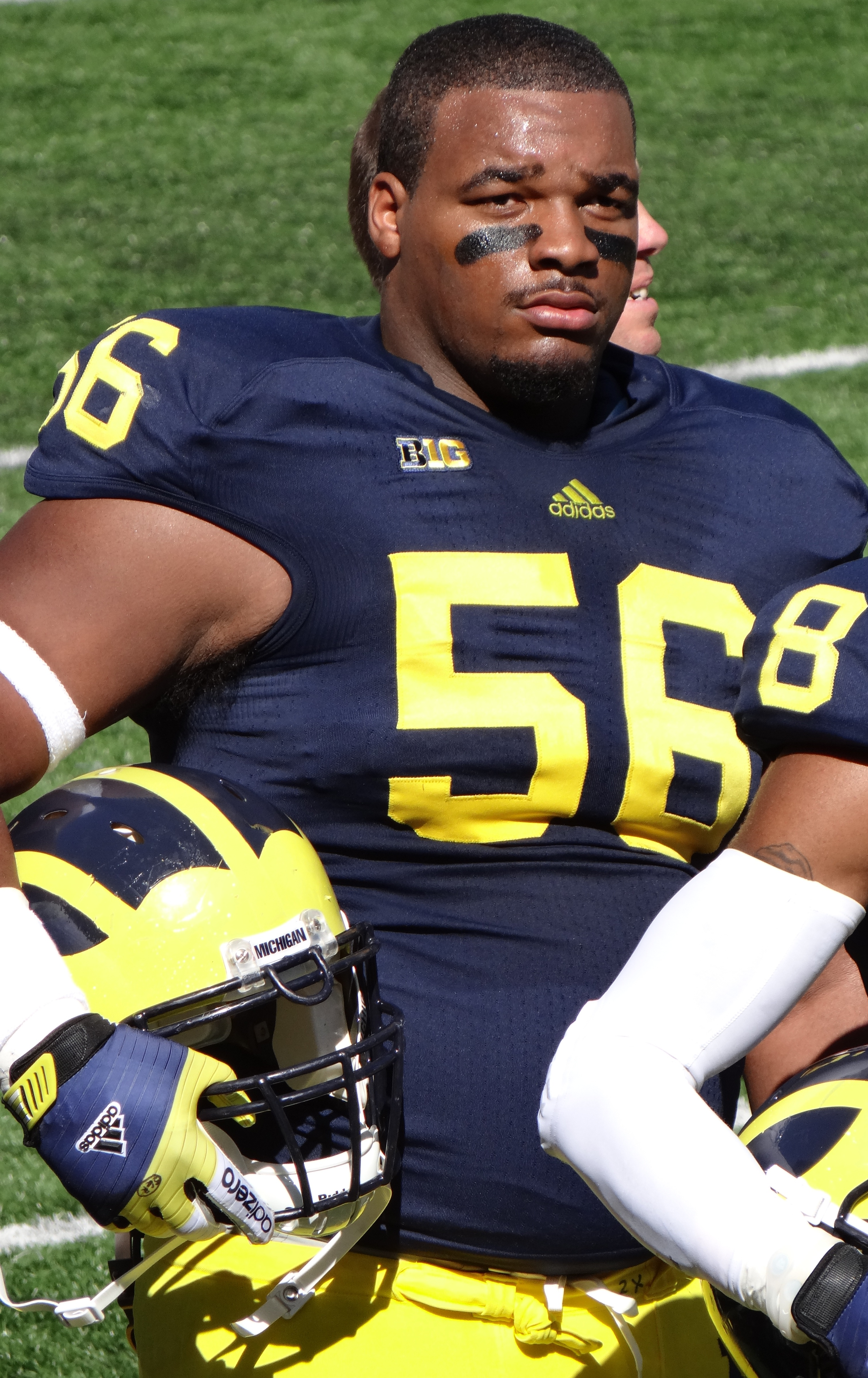
Pipkins with Michigan in 2012

As a true freshman in 2012, Pipkins appeared in 12 games as a reserve defensive tackle. He made his career debut against Alabama, which featured All-American interior linemen Barrett Jones and Chance Warmack, registering one tackle.

Pipkins arrived in camp for the 2013 season, he had lost more than 30 pounds from 347 pounds as a freshman to 315 pounds in August 2013. Pipkins said he was in the best shape of his life. Through the first two games of the 2013 season, Pipkins registered two tackles before tearing his ACL and sitting out the rest of the season. In 2015, Pipkins, citing pressure to medically retire at Michigan, transferred to continue his career at Texas Tech.

== Professional career ==
Pipkins signed with the Washington Redskins as an undrafted free agent on May 4, 2017. He was waived on September 2, 2017, but later re-signed to the team's practice squad on October 19, 2017.

Pipkins signed a reserve/future contract with the Redskins on January 1, 2018. On September 1, 2018, he was waived for final roster cuts before the start of the 2018 season. He then signed with the Arizona Hotshots for the 2019 season, but was waived during final roster cuts on January 30, 2019. He signed with the Quad City Steamwheelers of the Indoor Football League on October 13, 2019.
