= List of most consecutive games scoring in NCAA football =

The following is a list of the all-time leading NCAA Division I-A college football teams (in the United States) ranked by the number of consecutive games in which they scored.

== Division I – Football Bowl Subdivision ==
These are the rankings for the Football Bowl Subdivision (FBS) through the end of the 2025 season as recognized by the NCAA.

Most consecutive games scoring
Ranking	School	Number	Year
1	Florida	474†	1988–present
2	TCU	420†	1991–present
3	Georgia	401†	1995–present
4	Virginia Tech	395†	1995–present
5	Nebraska	377†	1996–present
6	Boise State	367†	1997–present
7	Michigan	365	1984–2014
8	BYU	361	1975–2003
9	Alabama	317†^	2001–present
10	Oklahoma	311	1998–2022
11	Clemson	307†	2003–present
12	Air Force	306	1992–2017
13	Texas Tech	302	1997–2021
14	Tennessee	289	1994–2017
15	Ohio State	286^	1993–2016
15	Iowa	286	2000–2023
17	Georgia Tech	283	1997–2019
18	Texas	282	1980–2004
19	Washington State	280	1984–2008
20	Washington	271	1981–2004
21	Oregon	267	1985–2007
22	Colorado	242	1988–2008
23	Kansas State	234	1996–2015
24	UCLA	233	1971–1992
24	Nebraska	233‡	1974–1991

† Active streak as of the conclusion of 2025 season

^ Does not include games later vacated by NCAA action

‡ The total number of games during Nebraska's 1974-1991 streak appear to be incorrect in the official rulebook. See "Discrepancies with Official NCAA Rulebook" section for more information.

Streaks that have recently ended:

During the 2021 season, Texas Tech lost 0–23 to Oklahoma State to end their streak at 302.

During the 2022 season, Oklahoma lost 0-49 to Texas to end their streak at 311.

During the 2023 season, Iowa lost 0-31 to Penn State to end their streak at 286.

== Division I – Football Championship Subdivision ==
These are the rankings for the Football Championship Subdivision (FCS) through the end of 2025 season as recognized by the NCAA.

Ranking	School	Number	Years
1	Montana	478†	1989–present
2	Dayton	303‡	1993–2022
3	Hampton	291	1984–2009
4	Lehigh	265	1986–2010
5	Delaware	220	1996–2014
6	North Dakota St.	223†	2010–present
7	Eastern Washington	199	1988–2006
8	Eastern Illinois	197^	1977–1996
9	Northern Iowa	165	1983–1996
10	McNeese State	158	1988–2001

† Active streak as of conclusion of 2025 season.

‡ While Dayton held a streak of 501 consecutive games without being shut out, 194 of these were when Dayton competed as a Division III program.

^ Before the FCS was formed in 1978.

During the 2022 season, Dayton lost 0-31 to Butler to end their streak at 303.

== Division II and III ==
The Valdosta State Blazers has the D-II record through the end of the 2024 season with 392 games with a score since September 21, 1991.

The Mount Union Purple Raiders has the D-III record through the end of the 2025 season with 548 games with a score since November 7, 1981.

== Discrepancies with Official NCAA Rulebook ==
The East Carolina Pirates claimed a scoring streak of 322 games scoring from 1997 through to 2023 but is not listed in the official NCAA records. This would place their streak at 8 on the all-time list. This streak ended on November 18, 2023 when Navy shutout the Pirates 10-0.

The USC Trojans claim an active streak of 344 games scoring dating back to 1997 as of the end of the 2025 season but is not listed on the official NCAA records. This would place their streak at 8 on the all-time list.

The Louisville Cardinals claim an active streak of 327 games scoring dating back to 2000 as of the end of the 2025 season but is not listed on the official NCAA records. This would place their streak at 9 on the all-time list.

The official NCAA record book claims a 233 game scoring streak for the Nebraska Cornhuskers from 1974 through to 1991 to place the Huskers tied for 24 on the list. However, Nebraska's streak during those years was 220 games, and would not be sufficient to be in this top 25.
