= Jabrill Peppers =

American football player (born 1995)

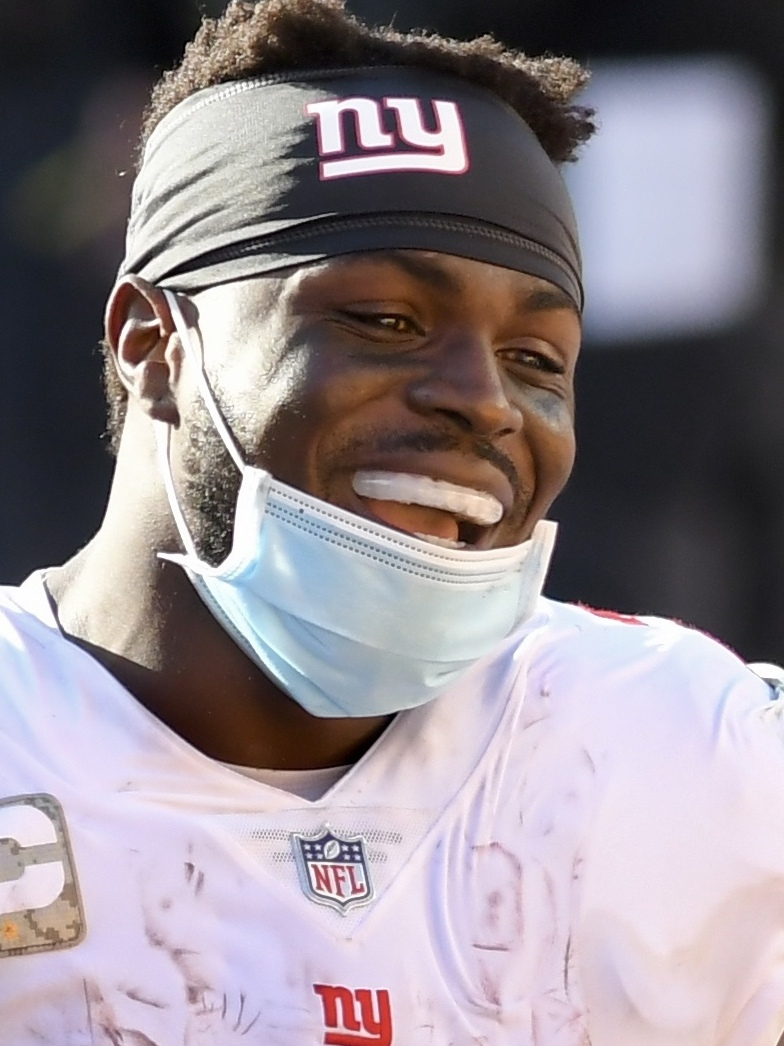
- Peppers with the New York Giants in 2020

Profile
- Position: Safety

Personal information
- Born: October 4, 1995 (age 31); East Orange, New Jersey, U.S.
- Listed height: 5 ft 11 in (1.80 m)
- Listed weight: 213 lb (97 kg)

Career information
- High school: Paramus Catholic (Paramus, New Jersey)
- College: Michigan (2014–2016)
- NFL draft: 2017: 1st round, 25th overall pick

Career history
- Cleveland Browns (2017–2018); New York Giants (2019–2021); New England Patriots (2022–2024); Pittsburgh Steelers (2025)

Awards and highlights
- Lott Trophy (2016); Paul Hornung Award (2016); Unanimous All-American (2016); Second-team All-American (2015); Big Ten Defensive Player of the Year (2016); Big Ten Linebacker of the Year (2016); Big Ten Return Specialist of the Year (2016); Big Ten Freshman of the Year (2015); 2× First-team All-Big Ten (2015, 2016)

Career NFL statistics as of 2025
- Total tackles: 527
- Sacks: 5.5
- Forced fumbles: 6
- Fumble recoveries: 8
- Pass deflections: 35
- Interceptions: 7
- Defensive touchdowns: 1
- Return yards: 1,468
- Stats at Pro Football Reference

Jabrill Ahmad Peppers (born October 4, 1995) is an American professional football safety. He was a two-time college football All-American for the Michigan Wolverines, earning unanimous All-American honors in 2016, as well as being named the Big Ten Defensive Player of the Year, Linebacker of the Year and Return Specialist of the Year. Peppers was selected in the first round by the Cleveland Browns in the 2017 NFL draft. He has also played for the New York Giants and the New England Patriots.

== Early life ==
A native of East Orange, New Jersey, Peppers originally attended Don Bosco Preparatory High School in Ramsey, New Jersey. Peppers also played youth football for the Montclair Bulldogs, from Montclair, New Jersey, a Pop Warner youth team. He started as a cornerback in his freshman year, before also taking over as a running back as a sophomore. With Peppers, Don Bosco won consecutive New Jersey state championships in 2010 and 2011, and was the top-ranked team in the nation by USA Today in 2011.

Peppers left Don Bosco to attend Paramus Catholic High School in Paramus, New Jersey, where he helped lead the Paladins to another state championship over Bergen Catholic in 2012. Peppers was named Player of the Year by MSG Varsity after his junior season with Paramus Catholic. In his senior year, another successful season saw Peppers lead Paramus Catholic to another state title, defeating St. Peter's Prep., making Peppers a state championship winner in all four years of his high school career. Peppers was also selected to participate in the 2013–14 Under Armour All-America Game.

As a talented track athlete, Peppers set the New Jersey Non-Public Class A outdoor 100-meter dash record with a time of 10.77 seconds. He has a personal-best of 10.51 seconds in the 100 meters. In his senior year at Paramus Catholic, he won both the 100 and 200-meter dashes in New Jersey's 2013 Meet of Champions, becoming only the second person ever to do so, after Fabian Santiago of Oakcrest High School the year before.

=== Recruiting ===
The Rivals.com recruiting network identified Peppers as one of the five-star recruits in the Class of 2014. On May 26, 2013, Peppers announced his verbal commitment to the Michigan Wolverines in a live telecast on ESPN. He was regarded as the head of Michigan's 2014 recruiting class. ESPN ranked him as the second-best recruit in the class of 2014, behind only running back Leonard Fournette.

== College career ==
As a true freshman at Michigan, Peppers appeared in three games, making one start under then-head coach Brady Hoke. In his first career start against Appalachian State, he recorded two tackles and returned one punt for six yards. However, he sustained an injury in the game and was redshirted for the remainder of his freshman season.

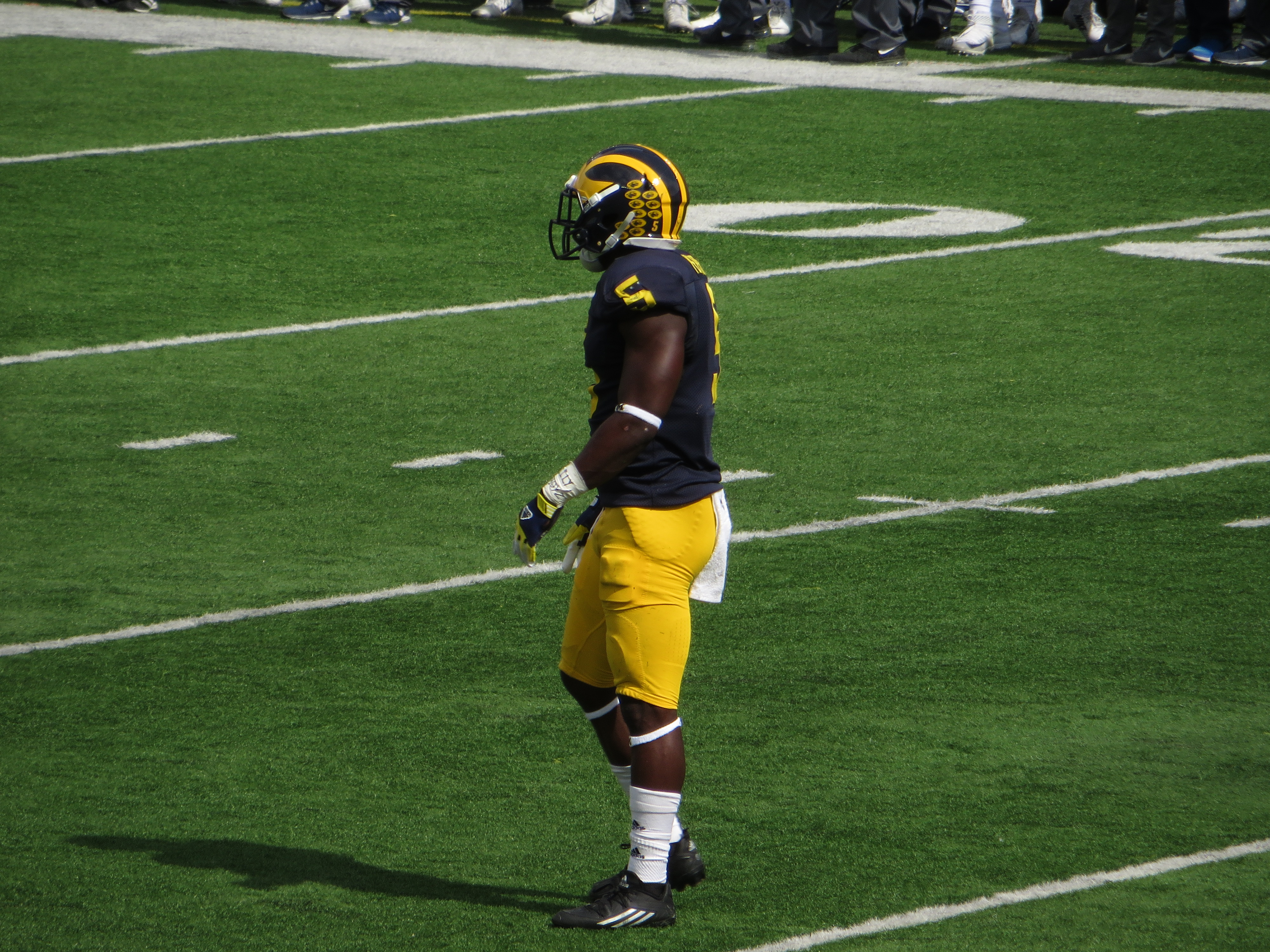
Peppers with the Michigan Wolverines in 2015

In the 2015 season, Peppers had a new head coach in Jim Harbaugh. Following the 2015 season, Peppers was named the Big Ten Thompson-Randle El Freshman of the Year, and named to the All-Big Ten defensive first-team, by both the coaches and media, and the All-Big Ten special teams second-team by coaches. He was also named a Second-team All-American by CBS Sports and Sports Illustrated. He was also named to the Freshman All-America Team by Football Writers Association of America (FWAA). He was a finalist for the Paul Hornung Award. In 12 games, Peppers played a combined 986 snaps this season, with 50 coming on offense, 765 on defense, and 171 on special teams. On defense, he registered 45 total tackles, 5.5 tackles-for-loss, and 10 pass breakups. On special teams, he returned all 17 punts on the season for 194 yards, an average of 11.4 yards per return. Peppers has returned eight kickoffs for 223 yards, an average of 27.9 yards per return, on a unit that ranked second in the FBS with 28.41 yards per kick return. On offense, he added eight catches for 79 yards with 18 rushes for 72 yards and two touchdowns. Peppers has gained 568 all-purpose yards on the season, an average of 47.3 yards per game, ranking fifth on the team.

Following an outstanding performance on September 17, 2016, against Colorado, Peppers was named the Walter Camp FBS Player of the Week, Co-Big Ten Defensive Player of the Week, and Special Teams Player of the Week. He became the first conference player to be named both Defensive and Special Teams Player of the Week in the same week since the special teams honor was added in 1994. Peppers recorded a career-best nine tackles, including six solo stops and 3.5 tackles-for-loss. In addition, he recorded 204 yards of total offense, including his first career punt return for a touchdown.

Following the 2016 season, Peppers was named the Nagurski-Woodson Defensive Player of the Year, Butkus-Fitzgerald Linebacker of the Year, Rodgers-White Return Specialist of the Year, and a Unanimous All-American. He became the first player in Big Ten history to collect three individual honors since the conference expanded its individual award recognition program in 2011. Peppers was also named to the All-Big Ten defensive first-team, and All-Big Ten special teams first-team by both the coaches and media. Peppers helped lead a unit that finished first in eight Big Ten defensive categories. He contributed a career-best 72 tackles, 16 tackles-for-loss, four sacks, one interception, and one forced fumble. He also contributed in special teams, posting 21 punt returns for 310 yards (14.8 avg.) and one touchdown and had 10 kickoff returns for 260 yards (26.0 avg.). He also contributed on the offensive side of the ball, rushing 27 times for 167 yards and three touchdowns while catching two passes. He was also awarded the Paul Hornung Award, honoring the nation's most versatile college football player, and the Lott Trophy. Peppers played 933 snaps during the 2016 campaign, logging 726 plays on defense, 53 plays on offense, and 154 snaps on special teams. Peppers saw the field at 15 different positions during the season. He finished fifth in voting for the 2016 Heisman Trophy.

On January 10, 2017, Peppers announced that he would be entering the 2017 NFL draft, forgoing his final two seasons of NCAA eligibility.

=== College statistics ===
Season	Team	GP	Defense						Rushing				Receiving				Punt return					Kick return				
Season	Team	GP	Tckl	TfL	Sck	PD	Int	FF	Att	Yds	Avg	TD	Rec	Yds	Avg	TD	Ret	Yds	Avg	Lng	TD	Ret	Yds	Avg	Lng	TD
2014	Michigan	3	8	0.0	0.0	0	0	0	0	0	0	0	0	0	0	0	1	6	6.0	6	0	0	0	0.0	0	0
2015	Michigan	12	45	5.5	0.0	10	0	0	18	72	4.0	2	8	79	9.9	0	17	194	11.4	41	0	9	223	27.9	49	0
2016	Michigan	12	72	13.0	4.0	1	1	1	27	167	6.2	3	2	3	1.5	0	21	310	14.8	54	1	10	260	26.0	55	0
Total		27	125	18.5	4.0	11	1	1	45	239	5.3	5	10	82	8.2	0	39	510	13.1	54	1	19	483	25.4	55	0

== Professional career ==
=== Pre-draft ===
He received an invitation to the NFL Combine and attended as a linebacker, as well as a safety. He ran all combine and positional drills, except for the short shuttle and three-cone drill. He ran the fastest 40-yard dash among all of the linebackers. He was ranked the third-best safety in the draft by Sports Illustrated, Pro Football Focus, ESPN, NFL analyst Mike Mayock, and NFL analyst Bucky Brooks. On April 25, 2017, only two days before the draft, it was reported that Peppers received a positive test for a drug screen that was given at the combine. The positive test was in fact due to a diluted sample, with his agent stating that Peppers drank ample amounts of water and was ill before traveling for the combine. He attended pre-draft visits with the Baltimore Ravens and San Francisco 49ers. At the conclusion of the pre-draft process, Peppers was projected to be a first or second round pick by NFL draft experts and scouts.

External videos
- Jabrill Peppers' NFL Combine Workout
- Jabrill Peppers runs a 4.46s 40-yard dash
- Jabrill Peppers bench presses 19 reps

Pre-draft measurables
Height	Weight	Arm length	Hand span	Wingspan	40-yard dash	10-yard split	20-yard split	Vertical jump	Broad jump	Bench press	Wonderlic
5 ft 10 7/8 in (1.80 m)	213 lb (97 kg)	30 3/4 in (0.78 m)	9 5/8 in (0.24 m)	6 ft 2 in (1.88 m)	4.46 s	1.53 s	2.62 s	35.5 in (0.90 m)	10 ft 8 in (3.25 m)	19 reps	26
All values from NFL Combine

=== Cleveland Browns ===
==== 2017 ====
The Cleveland Browns selected Peppers in the first round (25th overall) of the 2017 NFL draft. He was the third safety drafted in 2017, behind Jamal Adams (6th overall) and Malik Hooker (15th overall). On July 22, 2017, the Browns signed Peppers to a fully guaranteed four–year, $10.70 million contract that includes a signing bonus of $5.60 million.

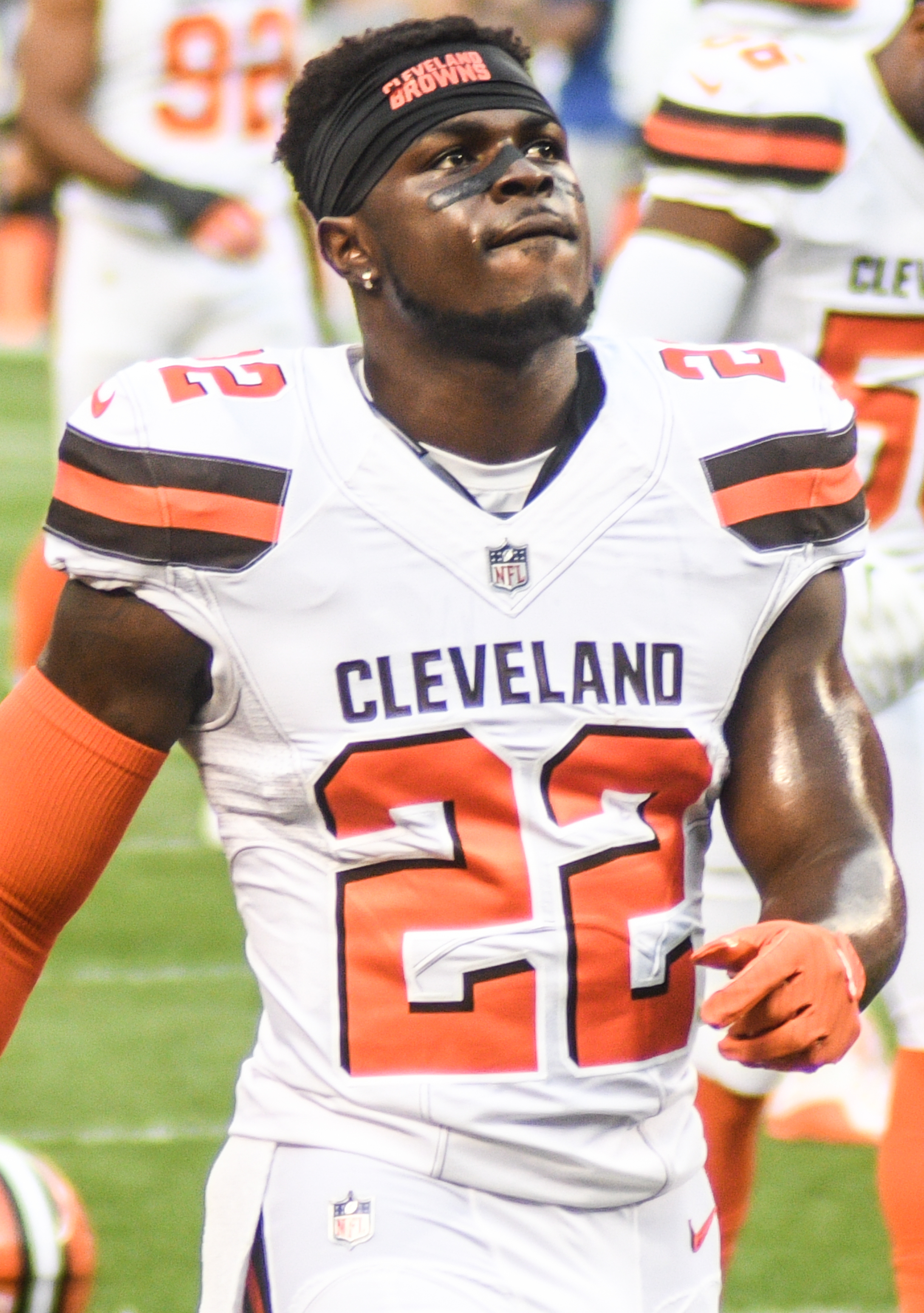
Peppers with the Cleveland Browns in 2017

He entered training camp slated as the starting strong safety. Head coach Hue Jackson named him the starting free safety to start the regular season, and paired him with Derrick Kindred. He was also named the starting kick returner and starting punt returner.

External videos
- Peppers makes first career interception

On September 10, 2017, Peppers made his professional regular season debut and earned his first career start in the Cleveland Browns' home-opener against the Pittsburgh Steelers and recorded four solo tackles and made one pass deflection in their 21–18 loss. In addition, he had one kickoff return for 14-yards and three punt returns for 34-yards. He was inactive for two games (Weeks 7–8) after injuring his toe. He was inactive as the Browns lost in overtime 21–27 against the Green Bay Packers in Week 14 due to a knee injury. In Week 15, he set a new season-high with seven combined tackles (five solo) during a 10–27 loss against the Baltimore Ravens. On December 31, 2017, Peppers made four solo tackles, one pass deflection, and had his first career interception on a pass attempt thrown by Landry Jones to wide receiver JuJu Smith-Schuster during a 28–24 at the Pittsburgh Steelers. He finished his rookie season in 2017 with 57 combined tackles (44 solo), three pass deflections, and one interception in 13 games and 13 starts. He also had 14 kick returns for 318 yards (22.7 YPR) and 30 punt returns for 180 yards (6.0 YPR). The Cleveland Browns finished the 2017 NFL season with a record of 0–16. He received an overall grade of 45.8 from Pro Football Focus as a rookie in 2017.

==== 2018 ====
During training camp, defensive coordinator Gregg Williams elected to move Peppers to strong safety after the Browns traded for Damarious Randall and had him compete for the starting role against Derrick Kindred. Head coach Hue Jackson named Peppers the starting strong safety to begin the regular season, alongside free safety Damarious Randall. He also retained his duties as the starting kick and punt returner. In Week 5, he recorded four combined tackles (three solo) and set a season-high with two pass deflections as the Browns won in overtime 12–9 to the Baltimore Ravens. On October 21, 2018, he set a season-high with eight combined tackles (seven solo) and made one pass deflection during a 23–26 overtime loss at the Tampa Bay Buccaneers. In Week 15, Peppers made six solo tackles, intercepted a pass thrown by Case Keenum to wide receiver Courtland Sutton, and made the game-winning sack for an 11–yard loss with 43 seconds remaining as the Browns defeated the Denver Broncos 17–16. He finished the 2018 season with one sack, 79 combined tackles (52 solo), one interception, and five passes defended while being a returner on special teams.

=== New York Giants ===
==== 2019 ====
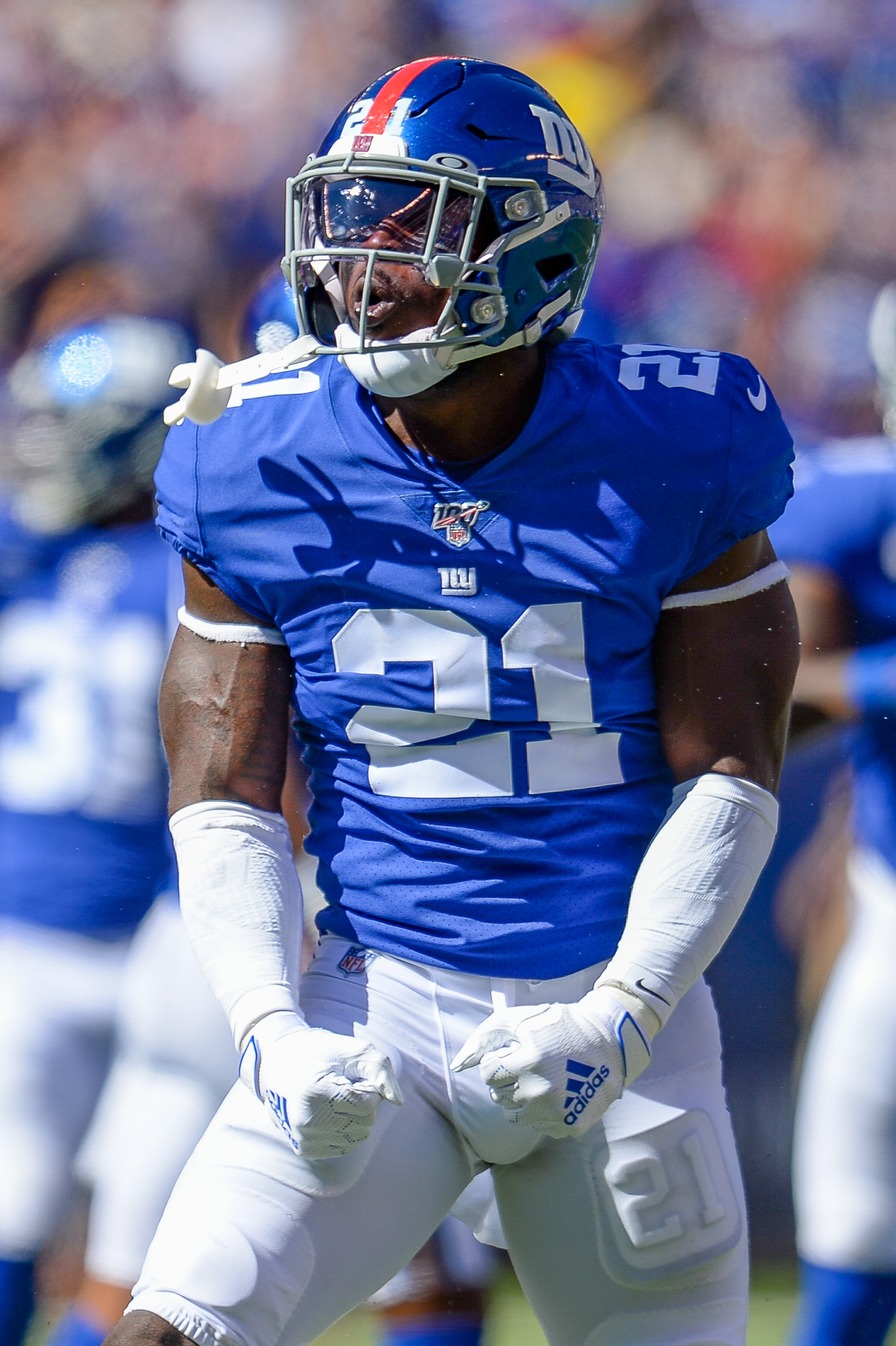
Peppers in a game against the Washington Redskins

On March 13, 2019, the New York Giants executed a trade with the Cleveland Browns, agreeing to send the Browns Odell Beckham Jr. and Olivier Vernon and in return received Peppers and Kevin Zeitler, as well as their first (17th overall) and third-round (95th overall) picks in the 2019 NFL draft.

He entered training camp slated as the de facto starting strong safety following the departure of Landon Collins. Head coach Pat Shurmur named him the starting strong safety to begin the season and paired him with Antoine Bethea.

On September 29, 2019, Peppers made four combined tackles (two solo), two pass deflections, and returned an interception thrown by Dwayne Haskins to tight end Jeremy Sprinkle for 32–yards to score his first career touchdown during a 24–3 win against the Washington Redskins. In Week 9, Peppers set a season-high with 12 combined tackles (seven solo) and forced a fumble on wide receiver Randall Cobb that was recovered by teammate Antoine Bethea in a 37–18 loss against the Dallas Cowboys on Monday Night Football. In Week 11, he made five combined tackles (four solo) before exiting in the third quarter of a 14–19 loss at the Chicago Bears due to an injury. On December 7, 2019, the Giants placed him on injured reserve for the remainder of the season due to a transverse process fracture in suffered in Week 11 and he was inactive for the last five games of the season (Weeks 13–17). He finished with a total of 76 combined tackles (51 solo), five pass deflections, and one interception in 11 games and 11 starts. On December 30, 2019, the New York Giants fired head coach Pat Shurmur after the team finished the season 4–12. He received an overall grade of 66.6 from Pro Football Focus in 2019.

==== 2020 ====
On January 8, 2020, the New York Giants hired New England Patriots special teams coordinator Joe Judge as their head coach. On April 29, 2020, the New York Giants picked up the fifth–year option on Peppers' contract, worth $6.77 million guaranteed for the 2021 season. Defensive coordinator Patrick Graham retained Peppers as the starting strong safety and paired him with Julian Love. He was named a captain as a part of the special team’s unit.

He was inactive for the Giants' 9–17 loss at the Los Angeles Rams in Week 4 due to an ankle injury. In Week 9, Peppers made six combined tackles (four solo), set a season-high with three pass deflections, and intercepted a pass by Alex Smith to running back J.D. McKissic during a 23–20 victory at the Washington Football Team. On November 14, 2020, it was reported that the league had fined Peppers $11,301 for a hit that injured quarterback Kyle Allen in Week 9. In Week 13, he made five combined tackles (three solo), two pass deflections, and set a career-high with an eight–yard sack on Russell Wilson as the Giants won 17–12 at the Seattle Seahawks. The sack set a career-high with 2.5 sacks in 2020. The following week, he set a season-high with 13 combined tackles (eight solo) and had a forced fumble as the Giants lost 7–26 against the Arizona Cardinals in Week 14. He appeared in 15 games and started 14 during the 2020 NFL season and finished with 91 combined tackles (57 solo), one interception, 11 passes defensed, set a career-high with 2.5 sacks, and had one forced fumble. He received an overall grade of 64.7 from Pro Football Focus in 2020.

==== 2021 ====
He returned to training camp slated as the starting strong safety. Head coach Joe Judge named him the starting strong safety to begin the season and paired him with Xavier McKinney.

He was sidelined during the Giants' 20–44 loss at the Dallas Cowboys in Week 5 due to a hamstring injury. On October 17, 2021, he set a season-high with nine combined tackles (five solo) during a 11–38 loss to the Los Angeles Rams. In Week 7, Peppers made four solo tackles and sacked Sam Darnold before exiting in the third quarter after rupturing his ACL during a six–yard punt return as the Giants defeated the Carolina Panthers 25–3. On October 26, 2021, the Giants officially placed Peppers on injured reserve after suffering a torn ACL and a high ankle sprain in Week 7 and he would remain inactive for the last ten games of the season (Weeks 8–18). He finished the season with 29 combined tackles (19 solo), one pass deflection, and one sack in six games and five starts.

=== New England Patriots ===
==== 2022 ====
On April 4, 2022, the New England Patriots signed Peppers to a one–year, $2.00 million contract that includes $1.35 million guaranteed upon signing and an initial signing bonus of $300,000. He was reunited with former New York Giants head coach Joe Judge, who accepted an assistant coach role with the Patriots after he was fired following the 2021 NFL season. Peppers entered training camp slated as a backup safety as he recovered from undergoing surgery to repair his torn ACL. Head coach Bill Belichick named him a backup and listed him as the fourth safety on the depth chart to begin the season, behind Devin McCourty, Kyle Dugger, and Adrian Phillips.

On January 1, 2023, Peppers set a season-high with eight combined tackles (six solo) as the Patriots defeated the Miami Dolphins 23–21. During his first season with New England, Peppers was relegated to a backup role and was a replacement when injuries necessitated his inclusion. He averaged 23 defensive snaps a game and would be inserted into the free safety position as Devin McCourty was tasked with covering the slot in nickel packages. He appeared in all 17 games with five starts and finished with a total of 60 combined tackles (35 solo) and one fumble recovery. He received an overall grade of 75.0 from Pro Football Focus in 2022.

==== 2023 ====
On March 17, 2023, the New England Patriots signed Peppers to a two–year, $9.00 million contract extension that included $6.00 million guaranteed and a signing bonus of $3.10 million. He opted to change his uniform number from No. 3 to No. 5 after it became available following the departure of veteran backup Brian Hoyer. Peppers previously wore No. 5 during his collegiate career at Michigan, but due to NFL jersey number allotment, he did not have a chance to don No. 5 until 2023. Entering training camp, he was projected to return as a backup safety and to compete for the primary backup role against Jalen Mills. He excelled in training camp and was praised for his improvement by HC Belichick. He unexpectedly beat out Adrian Phillips for the starting role at free safety following the retirement of Devin McCourty and was paired with strong safety Kyle Dugger.

In Week 7, he set a season-high with nine combined tackles (four solo), one pass deflection, and intercepted a pass by Josh Allen to tight end Dawson Knox during a 29–25 win against the Buffalo Bills. In Week 14, he made three combined tackles (one solo), one pass deflection, and intercepted a pass thrown by Mitchell Trubisky to tight end Pat Freiermuth as the Patriots won 21–18 at the Pittsburgh Steelers (their first win since Week 7). He was inactive for two games (Weeks 16–17) due to a hamstring injury. Peppers finished the 2023 NFL season with a total of 78 combined tackles (52 solo), one sack, two interceptions, and eight pass deflections. He received an overall grade of 87.3 from Pro Football Focus in 2023.

==== 2024 ====
On July 26, 2024, the New England Patriots signed Peppers to a three–year, $24.00 million contract extension that included $11.68 million guaranteed upon signing and an initial signing bonus of $6.00 million. The maximum value of the contract is worth up to $30 million with incentives included. Following the departure of HC Belichick, the Patriots promoted inside linebackers coach Jerod Mayo to head coach. Mayo retained Peppers and Dugger as the starting safeties to begin the regular season.

In Week 4, Peppers made seven combined tackles (three solo), set a season-high with two pass deflections, and intercepted a pass by Brock Purdy to wide receiver Brandon Aiyuk during a 13–30 victory at the San Francisco 49ers. On October 9, Peppers was placed on the commissioner's exempt list, which barred him from attending both practice and games, due to being arrested for domestic violence and possession of cocaine. On November 25, Peppers was removed from the commissioner's exempt list and officially reinstated after he remained inactive for eight games (Weeks 5–12). In Week 13, he made a season-high ten combined tackles (five solo) as the Patriots lost 24–25 to the Indianapolis Colts. Peppers injured his hamstring and was subsequently sidelined for the last three games of the season (Weeks 16–18). He finished the season with 40 combined tackles (20 solo), two pass deflections, and one interception in six games and six starts. He received an overall grade of 82.3 from Pro Football Focus, which ranked 7th amongst 171 qualifying safeties in 2024.

On August 29, 2025, the Patriots released Peppers before the start of the 2025 season.

=== Pittsburgh Steelers ===
On September 10, 2025, Peppers signed with the Pittsburgh Steelers on a one-year contract. Peppers appeared in 14 games and started two in the 2025 season. He had 16 total tackles and one fumble recovery.

== Personal life ==
Peppers was raised in East Orange, New Jersey by his mother, Ivory Bryant. His father, Terry Peppers, was active in his life until he was arrested when Jabrill was seven. He was arrested after being charged in a racketeering case as a part of the Bloods street gang, and was released from prison in 2014. His older brother, Don Curtis, died in January 2010, after being shot while standing at the counter of Lucky Joy Restaurant in Newark, New Jersey. Peppers maintained a 3.8 GPA through high school and is an avid rapper. He has stated that he has always had an interest in Michigan's football program and is a fan of Charles Woodson. He cultivated a relationship with Woodson throughout his time at Michigan. Peppers is also a member of Omega Psi Phi having become a member while an undergrad at the University of Michigan (Phi Chapter).

=== Endorsements ===
On March 6, 2017, it was reported that Peppers had signed a multi-year contract with Adidas.

=== Legal issues ===
On October 5, 2024, Peppers was arrested in Braintree, Massachusetts, on charges involving alleged domestic violence and cocaine possession. His attorney has alleged that "evidence completely contradicts the alleged victim's story." On November 22, 2024, during a court hearing, his trial date was set for January 22, 2025. The same day, it was also made public that his accuser filed a civil suit against him for $10.5 million. Since his arrest, Peppers has been required to avoid contact with his accuser as well. On January 24, Peppers was acquitted of all charges.
