= Jeremy Clark (defensive back) =

American football player (born 1994)

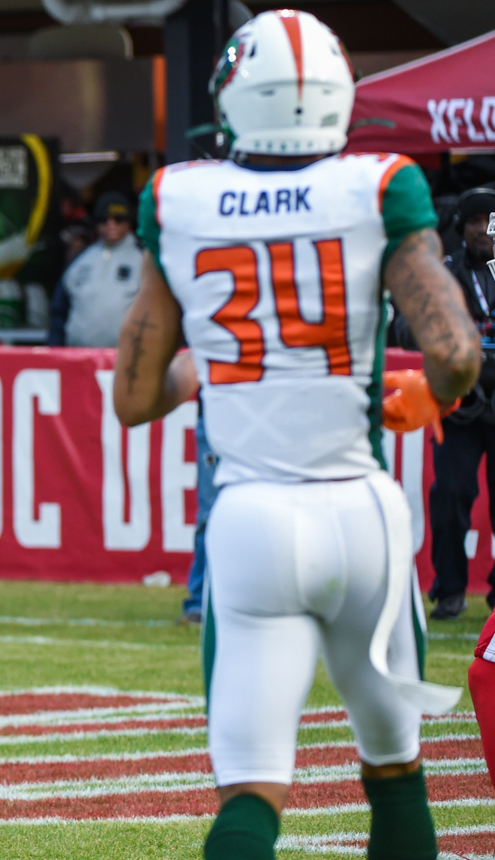
- Clark with the Seattle Dragons in 2020

Profile
- Position: Cornerback

Personal information
- Born: June 29, 1994 (age 32); Madisonville, Kentucky, U.S.
- Listed height: 6 ft 3 in (1.91 m)
- Listed weight: 220 lb (100 kg)

Career information
- High school: Madisonville North Hopkins
- College: Michigan
- NFL draft: 2017: 6th round, 197th overall pick

Career history
- New York Jets (2017–2018); Seattle Dragons (2020); Saskatchewan Roughriders (2021–2023)

Career CFL statistics
- Total tackles: 42
- Forced fumbles: 2
- Interceptions: 1
- Stats at CFL.ca
- Stats at Pro Football Reference

Jeremy Clark (born June 29, 1994) is an American professional football cornerback. He played college football at Michigan, and was selected by the New York Jets in the sixth round in the 2017 NFL draft.

== Early life ==
Clark was lettered twice in track and field while in high school. He also was selected to the Kentucky Bluegrass all-star and all-state first-team.

== Professional career ==
Clark was selected by the New York Jets in the sixth round, 197th overall pick in the 2017 NFL draft. He was placed on the reserve/non-football injury (NFI) list due to an ACL injury he suffered back in college. He was activated off NFI to the active roster on December 8, 2017.

On September 1, 2018, Clark was waived by the Jets and was signed to the practice squad the next day. He was promoted to the active roster on December 1, 2018.

On August 4, 2019, Clark was waived/injured by the Jets. After clearing waivers, he was placed on injured reserve on August 5. He was waived from injured reserve on September 2.

Clark signed with the Seattle Dragons of the XFL in December 2019. He had his contract terminated when the league suspended operations on April 10, 2020.

Clark signed with the Saskatchewan Roughriders of the Canadian Football League on December 21, 2020.

On February 13, 2024, he became a free agent.
