= Roy Manning =

American football player and coach (born 1981)

Current position
- Title: Edges Coach
- Team: University of Nebraska - Lincoln

Biographical details
- Born: December 4, 1981 (age 44); Saginaw, Michigan, U.S.

Playing career
- 2000–2004: Michigan
- 2005: Green Bay Packers
- 2006: Houston Texans
- 2006: Buffalo Bills
- 2007: Jacksonville Jaguars
- 2007: Cincinnati Bengals
- Position: Linebacker

Coaching career (HC unless noted)
- 2010: Cincinnati (DA)
- 2011: Michigan (GA)
- 2012: Cincinnati (RB)
- 2013: Michigan (OLB)
- 2014: Michigan (CB)
- 2015–2017: Washington State (OLB)
- 2018: UCLA (OLB/ST)
- 2019–2021: Oklahoma (CB)
- 2022–2023: USC (OLB/AHC)
- 2025: San Diego State (Edges)
- 2026: University of Nebraska (Edges)

Roy Lee Manning Jr. (born December 4, 1981), is an American football coach at Nebraska and a former player. Coach Manning played high school football at Saginaw High School in Saginaw, Michigan. He was a part of a state championship team that featured 3 other professional football players including Charles Rogers.Coach Manning last served as cornerbacks coach at the University of Oklahoma. He played linebacker in the National Football League for three seasons. Manning was originally signed by the Green Bay Packers as an undrafted free agent in 2005. He also played for the Houston Texans, Buffalo Bills, Jacksonville Jaguars, and Cincinnati Bengals during his NFL career. Manning played college football at Michigan. He won the 2004 Roger Zatkoff Award as the University of Michigan's football team's top linebacker.

== Coaching career ==
Manning began his coaching career as a defensive assistant at the University of Cincinnati in 2010. Following the 2010 season Manning took an offensive graduate assistant position under Brady Hoke at the University of Michigan, where he helped coach the Wolverines to an overall record of 11-2 including a win in the 2012 Sugar Bowl.

In February 2012, Manning returned to Cincinnati as the school's running backs coach. In his only season at Cincinnati, the Bearcats led the Big East in rushing offense. In January 2013 Manning was named running backs coach at Northern Illinois University. In March 2013, Manning returned to the University of Michigan as outside linebackers coach filling the coaching staff position left by the departure of Jerry Montgomery coaching outside linebackers in 2013 and cornerbacks in 2014. Wolverine linebackers Cam Gordon and Jake Ryan combined for 70 tackles, 13 tackles for loss and 5 sacks in 2013 while defensive back Raymon Taylor earned All-Big Ten honors in 2014. Michigan played in the 2013 Buffalo Wild Wings Bowl. From 2011 to 2014, the Michigan defense ranked among the top 20 nationally in 3 of the 4 seasons in total defense, pass defense and scoring defenses. Manning helped turn around this unit that in 2010 ranked 110th in total defense, 112th in passing defense and 108th in scoring defense.

In January 2015, Manning was hired by Mike Leach at Washington State as the Cougs' outside linebackers coach. In 2017, the Cougars ranked 16th nationally in total defense (323.3), ninth in passing defense (170.9) and ninth in turnovers gained (28) while allowing only 11 touchdown passes and posting 103 tackles for loss. In 2016, WSU's outside linebackers combined for 16 tackles for loss, 5.5 sacks and six turnovers, while they combined for 26.5 tackles for loss, 12 sacks and 146 tackles in 2015. The Cougars played in the 2015 Sun Bowl and 2016 and 2017 Holiday Bowls. In January 2019, Manning was hired as cornerbacks coach at the University of Oklahoma. In December 2021, Manning was hired as the outside linebackers coach at the University of Southern California.
