= 2016 Purdue Boilermakers football team =

American college football season

2016 Purdue Boilermakers football
- Conference: Big Ten Conference
- West Division
- Record: 3–9 (1–8 Big Ten)
- Head coach: Darrell Hazell (4th season; first 6 games); Gerad Parker (interim; remainder of season)
- Offensive coordinator: Terry Malone (1st season)
- Offensive scheme: Single set back
- Defensive coordinator: Ross Els (1st season)
- Co-defensive coordinator: Marcus Freeman (1st season)
- Base defense: 4–3
- Captains: Ja'Whaun Bentley; DeAngelo Yancey; Jake Replogle; Jordan Roos
- Home stadium: Ross–Ade Stadium

2016 Big Ten Conference football standings
	Conf.			Overall
Team	W		L	W		L
East Division
No. 7 Penn State xy$	8	–	1	11	–	3
No. 6 Ohio State x^	8	–	1	11	–	2
No. 10 Michigan	7	–	2	10	–	3
Indiana	4	–	5	6	–	7
Maryland	3	–	6	6	–	7
Michigan State	1	–	8	3	–	9
Rutgers	0	–	9	2	–	10
West Division
No. 9 Wisconsin xy	7	–	2	11	–	3
Iowa	6	–	3	8	–	5
Nebraska	6	–	3	9	–	4
Minnesota	5	–	4	9	–	4
Northwestern	5	–	4	7	–	6
Illinois	2	–	7	3	–	9
Purdue	1	–	8	3	–	9
Championship: Penn State 38, Wisconsin 31
^ – College Football Playoff participant; $ – Conference champion; x – Division champion/co-champions; y – Championship game participant; Rankings from AP Poll

The 2016 Purdue Boilermakers football team was an American football team that represented Purdue University in the 2016 NCAA Division I FBS football season. The Boilermakers were members of the West Division of the Big Ten Conference and played their home games at Ross–Ade Stadium in West Lafayette, Indiana. They were led by fourth-year head coach Darrell Hazell until he was fired on October 16, 2016. Gerad Parker was named the interim head coach for the remainder of the season. They finished the season 3–9, 1–8 in Big Ten play to finish in last place in the West Division.

== Preseason ==
In 2015, Purdue compiled a 2–10 record (1–7 in conference play) during the regular season, failing to qualify for a bowl game for the third straight season.

Purdue had a coaching shake up prior to the season, when defensive coordinator Greg Hudson, offensive coordinator / quarterbacks coach John Shoop and defensive line coach Rubin Carter were fired on November 29, 2015. On December 22, 2015, it was announced that tight ends coach Terry Malone would be promoted to offensive coordinator in addition to his tight end coaching duties. Purdue hired former Syracuse Orange football offensive coordinator Tim Lester as quarterbacks coach. On December 30, 2015, Purdue hired Miami Hurricanes football defensive line coach Randy Melvin to coach the defensive line. Just two days later, Purdue announced that they had completed their coaching staff with the hiring of Lincoln Southwest High School assistant Ross Els as the defensive coordinator.

Purdue suffered attrition when offensive line coach Jim Bridge left to take the role of assistant head coach, special teams coordinator and tight ends coach with the Duke Blue Devils football team, and running backs coach Jafar Williams took the same position with Rutgers. Williams was replaced by Syracuse running backs coach DeAndre Smith, and Bridge was replaced by Akron offensive line coach Darrell Funk.

== Recruiting ==
=== Position key ===
Back	B	Center	C	Cornerback	CB	Defensive back	DB
Defensive end	DE	Defensive lineman	DL	Defensive tackle	DT	End	E
Fullback	FB	Guard	G	Halfback	HB	Kicker	K
Kickoff returner	KR	Offensive tackle	OT	Offensive lineman	OL	Linebacker	LB
Long snapper	LS	Punter	P	Punt returner	PR	Quarterback	QB
Running back	RB	Safety	S	Tight end	TE	Wide receiver	WR

=== Recruits ===
Purdue's recruiting class consisted of 23 recruits, including three that enrolled early. Purdue's recruiting class was ranked 84th by Scout, 74th by Rivals, and 61st by ESPN.

College recruiting (2016)
Name	Hometown	School	Height	Weight	40^{‡}	Commit date
Jackson Anthrop; ATH	West Lafayette, Indiana	Lafayette Central Catholic H. S.	5 ft 10 in (1.78 m)	180 lb (82 kg)	–	Jan 17, 2016
Jackson Anthrop; ATH	Recruit ratings: Scout: Rivals: 247Sports: ESPN:					
Alex Criddle; DL	Broken Arrow, Oklahoma	Edison Preparatory School	6 ft 3 in (1.91 m)	315 lb (143 kg)	–	Dec 9, 2015
Alex Criddle; DL	Recruit ratings: Scout: Rivals: 247Sports: ESPN:					
J. D. Dellinger; K	Charlotte, North Carolina	Charlotte Country Day School	6 ft 1 in (1.85 m)	170 lb (77 kg)	–	Dec 13, 2015
J. D. Dellinger; K	Recruit ratings: Scout: Rivals: 247Sports: ESPN:					
Semisi Fakasiieiki; LB	Compton, California	Manuel Dominguez H. S.	6 ft 2 in (1.88 m)	225 lb (102 kg)	–	Feb 3, 2016
Semisi Fakasiieiki; LB	Recruit ratings: Scout: Rivals: 247Sports: ESPN:					
Javonte Ferguson; WR	Jacksonville, Florida	Edward H. White H. S.	5 ft 8 in (1.73 m)	160 lb (73 kg)	–	Feb 3, 2016
Javonte Ferguson; WR	Recruit ratings: Scout: Rivals: 247Sports: ESPN:					
Benaiah Franklin; WR	Tallahassee, Florida	Joseph Wheeler H. S.	6 ft 0 in (1.83 m)	205 lb (93 kg)	–	Jun 12, 2015
Benaiah Franklin; WR	Recruit ratings: Scout: Rivals: 247Sports: ESPN:					
Kamal Hardy; DB	Pembroke Pines, Florida	Monroe Community College	6 ft 0 in (1.83 m)	185 lb (84 kg)	–	Dec 13, 2015
Kamal Hardy; DB	Recruit ratings: Scout: Rivals: 247Sports: ESPN:					
Tanner Hawthorne; OL	Glendale, Arizona	Centennial H. S.	6 ft 6 in (1.98 m)	275 lb (125 kg)	–	Feb 3, 2016
Tanner Hawthorne; OL	Recruit ratings: Scout: Rivals: 247Sports: ESPN:					
Josh Hayes; DB	Indianapolis, Indiana	Pike H. S.	5 ft 11 in (1.80 m)	174 lb (79 kg)	4.62	Apr 30, 2015
Josh Hayes; DB	Recruit ratings: Scout: Rivals: 247Sports: ESPN:					
Grant Hermanns; OL	Albuquerque, New Mexico	Rio Rancho H. S.	6 ft 7 in (2.01 m)	268 lb (122 kg)	5.5	Jan 24, 2016
Grant Hermanns; OL	Recruit ratings: Scout: Rivals: 247Sports: ESPN:					
Terrance Landers; WR	Dayton, Ohio	Dunbar H. S.	6 ft 4 in (1.93 m)	170 lb (77 kg)	4.55	Jan 6, 2016
Terrance Landers; WR	Recruit ratings: Scout: Rivals: 247Sports: ESPN:					
Brian Lankford-Johnson; RB	St. Paul, Minnesota	Palm Bay H. S.	6 ft 1 in (1.85 m)	188 lb (85 kg)	4.41	Feb 2, 2016
Brian Lankford-Johnson; RB	Recruit ratings: Scout: Rivals: 247Sports: ESPN:					
Navon Mosley; DB	West Bloomfield, Michigan	West Bloomfield H. S.	5 ft 11 in (1.80 m)	181 lb (82 kg)	4.6	Jun 20, 2015
Navon Mosley; DB	Recruit ratings: Scout: Rivals: 247Sports: ESPN:					
Austin Larkin; DE	University City, Maryland	City College of San Francisco	6 ft 3 in (1.91 m)	250 lb (110 kg)	4.6	Dec 16, 2015
Austin Larkin; DE	Recruit ratings: Scout: Rivals: 247Sports: ESPN:					
Jalen Neal; OT	Tempe, Arizona	Scottsdale Community College	6 ft 7 in (2.01 m)	300 lb (140 kg)	–	Dec 16, 2015
Jalen Neal; OT	Recruit ratings: Scout: Rivals: 247Sports: ESPN:					
Lorenzo Neal; DL	Houston, Texas	St. Thomas H. S.	6 ft 2 in (1.88 m)	302 lb (137 kg)	5.2	Jan 2, 2016
Lorenzo Neal; DL	Recruit ratings: Scout: Rivals: 247Sports: ESPN:					
Christopher Parker; DB	Menifee, California	Mt. San Jacinto College	6 ft 2 in (1.88 m)	152 lb (69 kg)	5.2	Nov 24, 2015
Christopher Parker; DB	Recruit ratings: Scout: Rivals: 247Sports: ESPN:					
Brandon Shuman; DB	Miami, Florida	Gulliver Schools	5 ft 11 in (1.80 m)	154 lb (70 kg)	4.57	Jun 9, 2015
Brandon Shuman; DB	Recruit ratings: Scout: Rivals: 247Sports: ESPN:					
Rob Simmons; DE	Philadelphia, Pennsylvania	Valley Forge Military Academy and College	6 ft 6 in (1.98 m)	216 lb (98 kg)	–	Jan 31, 2016
Rob Simmons; DE	Recruit ratings: Scout: Rivals: 247Sports: ESPN:					
Simeon Smiley; DB	Pensacola, Florida	Pensacola Catholic H. S.	6 ft 0 in (1.83 m)	195 lb (88 kg)	4.64	Jan 24, 2016
Simeon Smiley; DB	Recruit ratings: Scout: Rivals: 247Sports: ESPN:					
Jared Sparks; QB	Geismar, Louisiana	Dutchtown H. S.	6 ft 1 in (1.85 m)	200 lb (91 kg)	–	Jan 17, 2016
Jared Sparks; QB	Recruit ratings: Scout: Rivals: 247Sports: ESPN:					
Anthony Watts; DT	Houston, Texas	Yates H. S.	6 ft 5 in (1.96 m)	292 lb (132 kg)	–	Dec 6, 2015
Anthony Watts; DT	Recruit ratings: Scout: Rivals: 247Sports: ESPN:					
Jack Wegher; ATH/WR	North Sioux City, South Dakota	IMG Academy	5 ft 10 in (1.78 m)	180 lb (82 kg)	4.58	Jul 9, 2015
Jack Wegher; ATH/WR	Recruit ratings: Scout: Rivals: 247Sports: ESPN:					
Overall recruit ranking: Scout: 65 Rivals: 73 247Sports: 77 ESPN: 61
Note: In many cases, Scout, Rivals, 247Sports, On3, and ESPN may conflict in their listings of height and weight.; In these cases, the average was taken. ESPN grades are on a 100-point scale.; Sources: "Purdue Football Commitments". Rivals.; "2016 Purdue Football Commits". Scout.; "ESPN". ESPN.; "Scout.com Team Recruiting Rankings". Scout.; "2016 Team Ranking". Rivals.com.; "2016 Purdue Boilermakers football team". 247Sports.

== Schedule ==
Purdue announced its 2016 football schedule on July 11, 2013. The 2016 schedule consisted of 7 home and 5 away games in the regular season. The Boilermakers hosted Big Ten foes Iowa, Northwestern, Penn State, and Wisconsin, and traveled to Illinois, Indiana, Maryland, Minnesota, and Nebraska.

The team also hosted all of the three non–conference games which were against the Cincinnati Bearcats from the American Athletic Conference (AAC), the Eastern Kentucky Colonels from the Ohio Valley Conference (OVC), and the Nevada Wolf Pack from the Mountain West Conference.

Date	Time	Opponent	Site	TV	Result	Attendance
September 3	12:00 pm	Eastern Kentucky*	Ross–Ade Stadium; West Lafayette, IN	ESPNews	W 45–24	32,074
September 10	12:00 pm	Cincinnati*	Ross–Ade Stadium; West Lafayette, IN	BTN	L 20–38	33,068
September 24	12:00 pm	Nevada*	Ross–Ade Stadium; West Lafayette, IN	ESPNews	W 24–14	41,607
October 1	3:30 pm	at Maryland	Maryland Stadium; College Park, MD	BTN	L 7–50	41,206
October 8	3:30 pm	at Illinois	Memorial Stadium; Champaign, IL (rivalry)	BTN	W 34–31 ^{OT}	42,912
October 15	12:00 pm	Iowa^{†}	Ross–Ade Stadium; West Lafayette, IN	ESPN2	L 35–49	40,239
October 22	3:30 pm	at No. 8 Nebraska	Memorial Stadium; Lincoln, NE	ABC/ESPN2	L 14–27	90,546
October 29	12:00 pm	No. 24 Penn State	Ross–Ade Stadium; West Lafayette, IN	ABC/ESPN2	L 24–62	33,157
November 5	3:30 pm	at Minnesota	TCF Bank Stadium; Minneapolis, MN	BTN	L 31–44	42,832
November 12	12:00 pm	Northwestern	Ross–Ade Stadium; West Lafayette, IN	BTN	L 17–45	30,548
November 19	12:00 pm	No. 6 Wisconsin	Ross–Ade Stadium; West Lafayette, IN	ABC	L 20–49	30,465
November 26	12:00 pm	at Indiana	Memorial Stadium; Bloomington, IN (Old Oaken Bucket)	ESPNU	L 24–26	43,103
*Non-conference game; ^{†}Homecoming; Rankings from AP Poll released prior to game; All times are in Eastern time

Schedule source:

== Radio ==
Radio coverage for all games will be broadcast statewide on The Purdue Sports Network and on Sirius XM Satellite Radio. The radio announcers are Tim Newton with play-by-play, Pete Quinn with color commentary, and Kelly Kitchel with sideline reports.

== Game summaries ==
=== Vs. Eastern Kentucky ===
Eastern Kentucky at Purdue

Team	1	2	3	4	Total
Colonels	8	10	0	6	24
• Boilermakers	21	7	0	17	45

- Date: September 3
- Location: Ross-Ade Stadium
  West Lafayette, IN
- Game start: 12:01 p.m. EDT
- Elapsed time: 3:39
- Game attendance: 32,074
- Game weather: 70 °F (21 °C), Sunny, ENE 7 mph (11 km/h)
- Referee: Larry Smith
- TV announcers (ESPNews): Dave LaMont & Ray Bentley

Scoring summary
1	13:04	PUR	Markell Jones 3-yard run (J. D. Dellinger kick)	PUR 7–0
1	10:13	PUR	David Blough 1-yard run (J. D. Dellinger kick)	PUR 14–0
1	3:31	PUR	Gelen Robinson 78-yard interception return (J. D. Dellinger kick)	PUR 21–0
1	:50	EKU	Dan Crimmins 10-yard pass from Bennie Coney (Neiko Creamer rush)	PUR 21–8
2	10:04	PUR	DeAngelo Yancey 35-yard pass from David Blough (J. D. Dellinger kick)	PUR 28–8
2	6:07	EKU	Lucas Williams 35-yard field goal	PUR 28–11
2	2:04	EKU	Ethan Thomas 10-yard run (Lucas Williams kick)	PUR 28–18
4	12:48	PUR	David Blough 1-yard run	PUR 35–18
4	4:56	PUR	J. D. Dellinger 30-yard field goal	PUR 38–18
4	4:23	PUR	Brian Lankford-Johnson 48-yard run	PUR 45–18
4	1:34	EKU	Cameron Fogle 2-yard pass from Tyler Swafford (Tyler Swafford pass failed)	PUR 45–24

Overall record	Previous meeting	Previous winner
1–0	September 1, 2012	Purdue, 48–6

To begin the season, Purdue hosted the Eastern Kentucky Colonels. This was the first meeting between the teams since 2012, which saw Purdue defeat Eastern Kentucky 48–6.

Purdue won the game 45–24. Purdue opened the scoring in the first quarter with a 3-yard touchdown rush and added to its lead with a 1-yard run by David Blough. Purdue would increase their lead even more with a 78-yard interception return by Gelen Robinson. After Missouri transfer Maty Mauk struggled in his first drive, Eastern Kentucky opened their scoring near the end of the first quarter with a 10-yard pass to Dan Crimmins from Bennie Coley and added a two-point conversion with a Neiko Creamer rush. Purdue responded to Eastern Kentucky touchdown with a 35-yard touchdown pass to DeAngelo Yancey from David Blough. On the ensuing drive, Eastern Kentucky added 3 points with a 35-yard field goal by Lucas Williams. The Colonels would add a 10-yard touchdown run by Ethan Thomas to draw the score 28–18 at halftime. After both teams failed to score any points in the third quarter, Purdue opened the scoring in the fourth with a 1-yard run by David Blough. J. D. Dellinger added a 30-yard field goal and a 48-yard run by Brian Lankford-Johnson. Eastern Kentucky closed out the scoring with a 2-yard pass to Cameron Fogle from Tyler Swafford.

Purdue's 45 points scored were the second most in the Darrell Hazell era.

=== Vs. Cincinnati ===
Cincinnati at Purdue

Team	1	2	3	4	Total
• Bearcats	7	14	3	14	38
Boilermakers	0	7	0	13	20

- Date: September 10
- Location: Ross-Ade Stadium
  West Lafayette, IN
- Game start: 12:01 p.m. EDT
- Elapsed time: 3:25
- Game attendance: 33,068
- Game weather: 71 °F (22 °C), Overcast, WSW 5 mph (8.0 km/h)
- Referee: Michael Roche
- TV announcers (BTN): Joe Beninati & Glen Mason

Scoring summary
1	8:07	CIN	Nate Cole 5-yard pass from Hayden Moore (Andrew Gantz kick)	CIN 7–0
2	13:58	CIN	Hayden Moore 9-yard run (Andrew Gantz kick)	CIN 14–0
2	10:30	PUR	Domonique Young 19-yard pass from David Blough (J. D. Dellinger kick)	CIN 14–7
2	6:19	CIN	D. J. Dowdy 20-yard pass from Hayden Moore (Andrew Gantz kick)	CIN 21–7
3	6:00	CIN	Andrew Gantz 26-yard field goal	CIN 24–7
4	14:10	CIN	Nate Cole 28-yard pass from Hayden Moore	CIN 31–7
4	10:48	PUR	Richie Worship 4-yard run (David Blough pass failed)	CIN 31–14
4	7:21	PUR	DeAngelo Yancey 36-yard pass from David Blough (J. D. Dellinger kick)	CIN 31–20
4	2:19	CIN	Hayden Moore 23-yard run (Andrew Gantz kick)	CIN 38–20

Overall record	Previous meeting	Previous winner
1–1	August 31, 2013	Cincinnati, 42–7

After its game against Eastern Kentucky, Purdue will faced Cincinnati. Cincinnati defeated Purdue 42–7 in the previous meeting.

Purdue was defeated 38–20 by Cincinnati. Cincinnati opened the scoring with a 5-yard pass to Nate Cole from Hayden Moore. Cincinnati increased their lead with a 9-yard Moore run to make the score 14–0. Purdue got on the board with a 19-yard Domonique Young pass to David Blough. Cincinnati closed out the first half scoring with a 20-yard D. J. Dowdy pass from Moore to make the score 21–7. The only scoring during the 3rd quarter was a 26-yard field goal by Andrew Gantz. Cole scored again for the Bearcats on a 28-yard pass from Moore. Purdue's comeback attempt started with a 4-yard Richie Worship run. Purdue scored again on a 36-yard pass from DeAngelo Yancey from Blough. After Blough was intercepted by Mike Tyson on their next drive, Cincinnati capped the scoring on a 23-yard run by Moore.

=== Vs. Nevada ===
Nevada at Purdue

Team	1	2	3	4	Total
Wolf Pack	7	7	0	0	14
• Boilermakers	0	10	7	7	24

- Date: September 24
- Location: Ross-Ade Stadium
  West Lafayette, IN
- Game start: 12:01 p.m. EDT
- Elapsed time: 3:03
- Game attendance: 41,607
- Game weather: 68 °F (20 °C), Mostly Cloudy, E 7 mph (11 km/h)
- Referee: Mike Cannon
- TV announcers (ESPNews): Mike Couzens & Dan Hawkins

Scoring summary
1	5:00	NEV	Hasaan Henderson 15-yard pass from Tyler Stewart (Brent Zuzo kick)	NEV 7–0
2	13:10	PUR	J. D. Dellinger 36-yard field goal	NEV 7–3
2	5:56	NEV	James Butler 6-yard pass from Tyler Stewart (Brent Zuzo kick)	NEV 14–3
2	1:20	PUR	Bilal Marshall 48-yard pass from David Blough (J. D. Dellinger kick)	NEV 14–10
3	8:03	PUR	Markell Jones 5-yard run	PUR 17–14
4	1:17	PUR	Brycen Hopkins 51-yard pass from David Blough (J. D. Dellinger kick)	PUR 24–14

Overall record	Previous meeting	Previous winner
0–0	First meeting	N/A

After playing Cincinnati, Purdue hosted the Nevada Wolf Pack. This was the first ever meeting between the two teams.

Purdue overcame an 11-point second quarter deficit to defeat the Nevada Wolf Pack 24–14. Purdue began the game with the loss of both of their starting offensive tackles, Martesse Patterson and Matt McCann for personal and injury reasons. Nevada opened up the scoring with a 15-yard touchdown pass from Tyler Stewart. Purdue answered back in the second quarter with a 36-yard field goal from J. D. Dellinger. After an exchanging of punts, Nevada increased their lead with a 6-yard touchdown pass to James Butler from Stewart. Purdue scored one more time before the half on a 48-yard pass to Bilal Marshall from David Blough to make the score 14–10 at the half. Purdue took the lead with the only score in the 3rd quarter with a 5-yard Markell Jones run. Purdue closed out the scoring with a 51-yard touchdown reception by Brycen Hopkins from Blough.

The win for the Boilermakers marked the 600th win in program history.

=== At Maryland ===
Purdue at Maryland

Team	1	2	3	4	Total
Boilermakers	0	0	0	7	7
• Terrapins	8	21	7	14	50

- Date: October 1
- Location: Maryland Stadium
  College Park, MD
- Game start: 3:42 p.m. EDT
- Elapsed time: 3:20
- Game attendance: 41,206
- Game weather: 63 °F (17 °C), Cloudy, NE 4 mph (6.4 km/h)
- Referee: Mike Kluczynski
- TV announcers (BTN): Joe Beninati & J Leman

Scoring summary
1	6:59	MD	Teldrick Morgan 11-yard pass from Perry Hills (Kenneth Goins pass from Caleb Rowe)	MD 8–0
2	13:35	MD	Lorenzo Harrison 62-yard run (Adam Greene kick)	MD 15–0
2	10:08	MD	Ty Johnson 8-yard run (Adam Greene kick)	MD 22–0
2	0:11	MD	Perry Hills 11-yard run (Adam Greene kick)	MD 29–0
3	7:27	MD	Teldrick Morgan 5-yard pass from Perry Hills	MD 36–0
4	13:30	PUR	Cole Herdman 4-yard pass from David Blough (J. D. Dellinger kick)	MD 36–7
4	8:03	MD	Ty Johnson 48-yard run (Adam Greene kick)	MD 43–7
4	7:12	MD	Jake Funk 9-yard pass from Tyrrell Pigrome (Adam Greene kick)	MD 50–7

Overall record	Previous meeting	Previous winner
0–1	December 29, 2006	Maryland, 24–7

Following its game against Nevada, Purdue began its Big Ten portion of the schedule when it traveled to the Maryland Terrapins. Maryland defeated Purdue 24–7 in the 2006 Champs Sports Bowl.

Purdue lost in a blowout, 50–7. The scoring began with an 11-yard pass to Teldrick Morgan from Perry Hills, on the ensuing point after attempt, Maryland ran a swinging gate and saw a matchup that they liked completing the 2-point conversion with Caleb Rowe's pass to Kenneth Goins. Maryland added to its lead on a 62-yard run by Lorenzo Harrison III, an 8-yard run by Ty Johnson and an 11-yard Hills run to make the score 29–0 in favor of Maryland at half-time. Maryland's lead grew larger with another touchdown pass to Morgan from Hills in the third quarter. Purdue cut into Maryland's lead with a 4-yard Cole Herdman touchdown from David Blough. Maryland closed out the scoring with two fourth-quarter touchdowns on a 48-yard run by Johnson and a Jake Funk 9-yard touchdown reception from Tyrrell Pigrome.

=== At Illinois ===
Purdue at Illinois
(Battle for the Purdue Cannon)

Team	1	2	3	4	OT	Total
• Boilermakers	7	14	3	7	3	34
Fighting Illini	3	13	7	8	0	31

- Date: October 8
- Location: Memorial Stadium
  Champaign, IL
- Game start: 4:42 p.m. CDT
- Elapsed time: 3:48
- Game attendance: 42,912
- Game weather: 67 °F (19 °C), Clear, NW 7 mph (11 km/h)
- Referee: Don Willard
- TV announcers (BTN): Eric Collins & Glen Mason

Scoring summary
1	8:58	IL	Chase McLaughlin 20-yard field goal	IL 3–0
1	2:02	PUR	David Blough 9-yard run (J. D. Dellinger kick)	PUR 7–3
2	14:56	IL	Chase McLaughlin 47-yard field goal	PUR 7–6
2	9:59	PUR	Brian Lankford-Johnson 32-yard run (J. D. Dellinger kick)	PUR 14–6
2	5:11	IL	Chayce Crouch 26-yard run (Chase McLaughlin kick)	PUR 14–13
2	3:07	PUR	Malik Kimbrough 45-yard pass from David Blough (J. D. Dellinger kick)	PUR 21–13
2	0:29	IL	Chase McLaughlin 34-yard field goal	PUR 21–16
3	3:20	IL	Chayce Crouch 3-yard run (Chase McLaughlin kick)	IL 23–21
3	0:38	PUR	J. D. Dellinger 37-yard field goal	PUR 24–23
4	12:34	IL	Kendrick Foster 3-yard run (Chayce Crouch pass conversion)	IL 31–24
4	9:55	PUR	Richie Worship 8-yard run (J. D. Dellinger kick)	Tie 31–31
OT	0:00	PUR	J. D. Dellinger 28-yard field goal	PUR 34–31

Overall record	Previous meeting	Previous winner
44–42–6	November 7, 2015	Illinois, 48–14

After its game against Maryland, Purdue traveled to Champaign to face its rival, the Illinois Fighting Illini, for the Purdue Cannon. Illinois defeated Purdue 48–14 in the previous season.

Purdue defeated Illinois in an offensive battle, 34–31 in overtime. Illinois began the scoring with a 20-yard field goal by Chase McLaughlin. Following an exchange of punts, Purdue took their first lead of the game on a nine-yard run by David Blough. Another field goal by McLaughlin cut Purdue's lead to one, but Purdue answered back the following drive with a 32-yard run by Brian Lankford-Johnson. Purdue looked to be taking charge of the game with a 3rd down stop, but it was nullified by a roughing the passer hit on Wes Lunt by Danny Ezechukwu, injuring Lunt to the point where he would not return to the game. Chayce Crouch, who had been rotating in with Lunt at quarterback was now the full-time quarterback for Illinois. Crouch's running ability on the zone-read proved difficult for Purdue to stop as Crouch lead the Fighting Illini to a 26-yard touchdown run. Purdue responded with a 45-yard pass from Blough to Malik Kimbrough. Just before the half, McLaughlin made another field goal to give Purdue just a 21–16 halftime lead. Crouch opened up the second half scoring with a 3-yard run, giving Illinois their second lead of the game. Purdue regained the lead once again with a 37-yard J. D. Dellinger field goal just before the end of the third quarter. Kendrick Foster's 3-yard run just gave Illinois their largest lead of the game with 12:34 to play. On Purdue's ensuing drive Richie Worship scored on a 6-yard touchdown run to tie the game. Illinois would get a chance for the win when McLaughlin lined up for a field goal with seconds left. Darrell Hazell chose to use all three of his remaining timeouts in an attempt to ice McLaughlin. McLaughlin's kick would fall no good after hitting the right upright forcing overtime. Purdue won the toss and chose defense. Crouch fumbled on Illinois' first possession, recorded by Leroy Clark of Purdue. After a first down run by Worship, Dellinger kicked a 28-yard field goal to give Purdue the victory.

=== Vs. Iowa ===
Iowa at Purdue
(Homecoming game)

Team	1	2	3	4	Total
• Hawkeyes	21	14	7	7	49
Boilermakers	0	7	7	21	35

- Date: October 15
- Location: Ross-Ade Stadium
  West Lafayette, IN
- Game start: 12:00 p.m. EDT
- Elapsed time: 3:45
- Game attendance: 40,239
- Game weather: 67 °F (19 °C), Cloudy, SSW 14 mph (23 km/h)
- Referee: Mike Cannon
- TV announcers (ESPN2): Anish Shroff, Tom Ramsey & Kevin Weidl

Scoring summary
1	8:57	IOWA	LeShun Daniels 1-yard run (Keith Duncan kick)	IOWA 7–0
1	2:20	IOWA	C. J. Beathard 15-yard run (Keith Duncan kick)	IOWA 14–0
1	:09	IOWA	Riley McCarron 42-yard pass from C. J. Beathard (Keith Duncan kick)	IOWA 21–0
2	3:48	IOWA	LeShun Daniels 4-yard run (Keith Duncan kick)	IOWA 28–0
2	1:29	PUR	Brycen Hopkins 25-yard pass from David Blough (J. D. Dellinger kick)	IOWA 28–7
2	1:18	IOWA	Akrum Wadley 75-yard run (Keith Duncan kick)	IOWA 35–7
3	8:06	PUR	Cole Herdman 53-yard pass from David Blough (J. D. Dellinger kick)	IOWA 35–14
3	6:07	IOWA	Noah Fant 5-yard pass from C. J. Beathard (Keith Duncan kick)	IOWA 42–14
4	8:40	PUR	Bilal Marshall 7-yard pass from David Blough (J. D. Dellinger kick)	IOWA 42–21
4	5:36	PUR	DeAngelo Yancey 54-yard pass from David Blough (J. D. Dellinger kick)	IOWA 42–28
4	1:44	IOWA	Desmond King 41-yard interception return (Keith Duncan kick)	IOWA 49–28
4	:17	PUR	Brycen Hopkins 37-yard pass from David Blough (J. D. Dellinger kick)	IOWA 49–35

Overall record	Previous meeting	Previous winner
46–37–3	November 21, 2015	Iowa, 40–20

Following its clash with Illinois, Purdue hosted the Iowa Hawkeyes for its homecoming game. The 2015 season saw Iowa defeat Purdue 40–20.

Iowa defeated the Boilermakers in a shootout, 49–35. Iowa opened up the scoring with a 1-yard run by LeShun Daniels. Iowa increased their lead with a 3rd down scramble for a 15-yard touchdown run by C. J. Beathard. After a quick 3-and-out by Purdue, Iowa scored again on a 42-yard Beathard pass to Riley McCarron, closing out the first quarter scoring. After several exchanges of punts, Iowa scored again on a 4-yard run by Daniels. Purdue scored their first points of the game with a 25-yard pass from David Blough to Brycen Hopkins. After the kickoff after the Hopkins touchdown, Iowa scored on its first play with a 75-yard Akrum Wadley touchdown run to bring the halftime score to 35–7 in favor of Iowa. Purdue opened up the second half scoring with a 53-yard Blough pass to Cole Herdman. Iowa responded with a 5-yard Noah Fant touchdown reception from Beathard. Purdue scored again on a 7-yard pass from Blough to Bilal Marshall. After a 3-and-out by Iowa, who had put in their reserves, Purdue scored again on a 54-yard Blough pass to DeAngelo Yancey. After yet another 3-and-out, Iowa put in their starting defensive unit. Blough was intercepted by Desmond King, who returned the interception 41-yards for an Iowa score, increasing their lead to 21 again. Purdue scored once more with another Hopkins touchdown reception from Blough for 37-yards.

Head Coach Darrell Hazell was fired on October 16, 2016, the day after this game.

=== At Nebraska ===
Purdue at Nebraska

Team	1	2	3	4	Total
Boilermakers	7	7	0	0	14
• #8 Cornhuskers	10	0	7	10	27

- Date: October 22
- Location: Memorial Stadium
  Lincoln, NE
- Game start: 3:30 p.m. EDT
- Elapsed time: 3:28
- Game attendance: 90,546
- Game weather: 73 °F (23 °C), Clear, Sunny 32% humidity, SE 13 mph (21 km/h)
- Referee: Jerry McGinn
- TV announcers (ABC): Mike Patrick, Ed Cunningham & Dr. Jerry Punch

Scoring summary
1	14:44	NEB	Tommy Armstrong Jr. 22-yard run (Drew Brown kick)	NEB 7–0
1	10:20	PUR	DeAngelo Yancey 1-yard pass from David Blough (J. D. Dellinger kick)	TIE 7–7
1	4:03	NEB	Drew Brown 30-yard field goal	NEB 10–7
2	10:52	PUR	DeAngelo Yancey 88-yard pass from David Blough (J. D. Dellinger kick)	PUR 14–10
3	7:45	NEB	De'Mornay Pierson-El 40-yard pass from Tommy Armstrong Jr. (Drew Brown kick)	NEB 17–14
4	14:05	NEB	Alonzo Moore 24-yard run (Drew Brown kick)	NEB 24–14
4	11:10	NEB	Drew Brown 51-yard field goal	NEB 27–14

Overall record	Previous meeting	Previous winner
2–2	October 31, 2015	Purdue, 55–45

After its homecoming game against Iowa, Purdue traveled to Lincoln to face its in-division rival, the Nebraska Cornhuskers. Purdue defeated Nebraska 55–45 in the previous season.

Nebraska won the game 27–14 in Gerad Parker's head coaching debut. After a failed running back pass by Markell Jones was intercepted, Tommy Armstrong Jr. ran 22-yards to give Nebraska its first lead just 26 seconds into the game. On the ensuing drive, Purdue drove the length of the field and scored on a 1-yard touchdown reception by DeAngelo Yancey from David Blough. Drew Brown would hit a 30-yard field goal to regain the lead from Nebraska at the end of the first quarter. Purdue would take a lead when Blough found Yancey on a crossing pattern and ran 88-yards for a score. Purdue went into the halftime break with a 14–10 lead. Nebraska took the lead in the 3rd quarter with a 40-yard Armstrong Jr. pass to De'Mornay Pierson-El. Nebraska would score again on a 24-yard rush by Alonzo Moore. The final score came with 11:10 in the fourth quarter, on a 51-yard field goal by Drew Brown.

=== Vs. Penn State ===
Penn State at Purdue

Team	1	2	3	4	Total
• #24 Nittany Lions	7	10	24	21	62
Boilermakers	7	10	7	0	24

- Date: October 29
- Location: Ross-Ade Stadium
  West Lafayette, IN
- Game start: 12:06 p.m. EST
- Elapsed time: 3:33
- Game attendance: 33,157
- Game weather: 67 °F (19 °C), Party Sunny, SW 9 mph (14 km/h)
- Referee: Jeff Servinski
- TV announcers (ABC/ESPN2): Beth Mowins, Anthony Becht & Rocky Boiman

Scoring summary
1	11:33	PSU	Saquon Barkley 3-yard run (Tyler Davis kick)	PSU 7–0
1	6:26	PUR	Markell Jones 1-yard run (J. D. Dellinger kick)	TIE 7–7
2	14:32	PUR	Cameron Posey 1-yard pass from David Blough (J. D. Dellinger kick)	PUR 14–7
2	12:33	PSU	Chris Godwin 38-yard pass from Trace McSorley (Tyler Davis kick)	TIE 14–14
2	6:57	PUR	J. D. Dellinger 42-yard field goal	PUR 17–14
2	2:36	PSU	Tyler Davis 33-yard field goal	TIE 17–17
3	12:29	PSU	Chris Godwin 1-yard pass from Trace McSorley (Tyler Davis kick)	PSU 24–17
3	8:17	PSU	Andre Robinson 4-yard run (Tyler Davis kick)	PSU 31–17
3	4:21	PSU	Tyler Davis 29-yard field goal	PSU 34–17
3	2:32	PUR	DeAngelo Yancey 62-yard pass from David Blough (J. D. Dellinger kick)	PSU 34–24
3	1:18	PSU	Miles Sanders 21-yard pass from Trace McSorley (Tyler Davis kick)	PSU 41–24
4	13:56	PSU	Saquon Barkley 81-yard Run (Tyler Davis kick)	PSU 48–24
4	6:09	PSU	Mark Allen 1-yard run (Tyler Davis kick)	PSU 55–24
4	2:25	PSU	Andre Robinson 19-yard run (Tyler Davis kick)	PSU 62–24

Overall record	Previous meeting	Previous winner
3–13–1	November 16, 2013	Penn State, 45–21

After traveling to Nebraska, Purdue hosted Penn State Nittany Lions. This will be the first meeting between the two schools since Penn State defeated Purdue 45–21 in 2013.

Penn State won in a blowout 62–24. Penn State opened the scoring with a 3-yard touchdown run by Saquon Barkley. Purdue responded the following drive with a 1-yard run by Markell Jones. After the defense forced a punt, Purdue's offense drove 55-yards completed by a 1-yard touchdown pass from David Blough to Cameron Posey. Penn State would tied the game when Trace McSorley found Chris Godwin on a crossing pattern that went 38-yards for a touchdown. Purdue responded with a 42-yard field goal from J. D. Dellinger. Penn State responded with their own 33-yard field goal by Tyler Davis. With just 4:21 remaining in the half, Purdue and Penn State exchanged punts, Purdue drove to a spot where they would attempt a 39-yard field goal before the half, but Dellinger's kick missed wide left. The score was 17–17 at halftime. Purdue opened the second half with the ball, but on their first 3rd down, Blough was intercepted by Brandon Smith. Penn State then opened the scoring in the 3rd quarter with a 1-yard touchdown pass to Godwin from McSorley. Penn State extended their lead with a 4-yard touchdown run by Andre Robinson, and a 29-yard field goal by Davis. Purdue responded with a 62-yard touchdown pass from Blough to DeAngelo Yancey. Penn State capped the third quarter scoring with a 21-yard Miles Sanders touchdown reception from McSorley. After another 3-and-out by Purdue, Barkley took the first handoff of the 4th quarter 81-yards for a touchdown. Penn State completed the scoring with a 1-yard Mark Allen rushing touchdown and a 19-yard Robinson touchdown run.

=== At Minnesota ===
Purdue at Minnesota

Team	1	2	3	4	Total
Boilermakers	14	14	0	3	31
• Golden Gophers	10	13	7	14	44

- Date: November 5
- Location: TCF Bank Stadium
  Minneapolis, MN
- Game start: 2:36 p.m. EST
- Elapsed time: 3:42
- Game attendance: 42,832
- Game weather: 71 °F (22 °C), Sunny, S 7 mph (11 km/h)
- Referee: Don Willard
- TV announcers (BTN): Cory Provus, Glen Mason & Allison Hayes

Scoring summary
1	12:50	MIN	Emmit Carpenter 52-yard field goal	MIN 3–0
1	10:51	MIN	Rodney Smith 35-yard run (Emmit Carpenter kick)	MIN 10–0
1	8:55	PUR	Cole Herdman 20-yard pass from David Blough (J. D. Dellinger kick)	MIN 10–7
1	2:10	PUR	Cameron Posey 89-yard pass from David Blough (J. D. Dellinger kick)	PUR 14–10
2	10:26	MIN	Emmit Carpenter 53-yard field goal	PUR 14–13
2	4:27	MIN	Mitch Leidner 2-yard run (Emmit Carpenter kick)	MIN 20–14
2	2:55	PUR	DeAngelo Yancey 60-yard pass from David Blough (J. D. Dellinger kick)	PUR 21–20
2	1:27	MIN	Emmit Carpenter 28-yard field goal	MIN 23–21
2	0:00	PUR	Brycen Hopkins 2-yard pass from David Blough (J. D. Dellinger kick)	PUR 28–23
3	11:16	MIN	Rodney Smith 7-yard run (Emmit Carpenter kick)	MIN 30–28
4	11:45	MIN	Mitch Leidner 9-yard run (Emmit Carpenter kick)	MIN 37–28
4	5:10	PUR	J. D. Dellinger 34-yard field goal	MIN 37–31
4	1:30	MIN	Rodney Smith 14-yard run (Emmit Carpenter kick)	MIN 44–31

Overall record	Previous meeting	Previous winner
32–36–3	October 10, 2015	Minnesota, 41–13

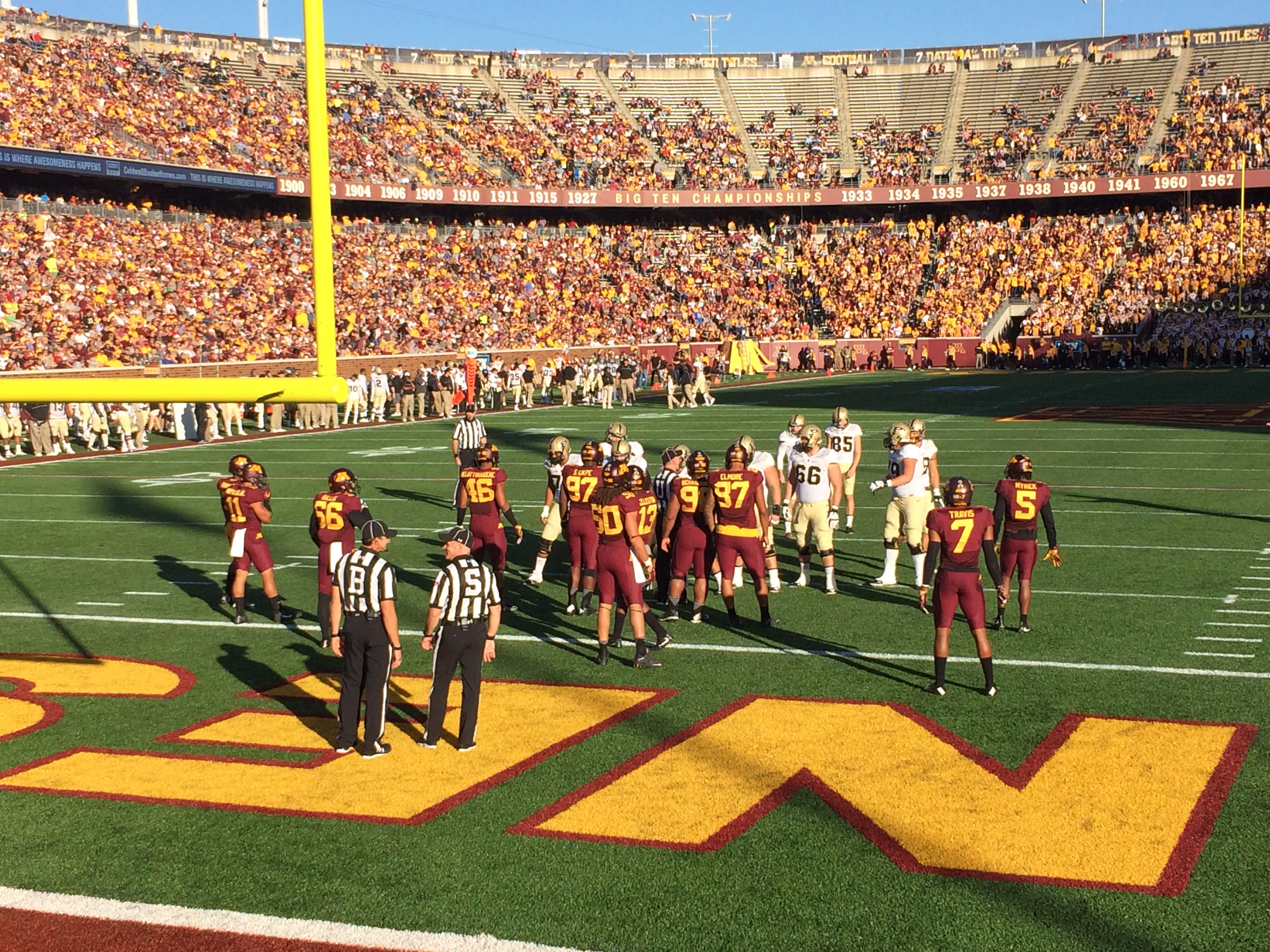
Purdue at Minnesota

After hosting Penn State, Purdue traveled to Minneapolis, Minnesota to face the Minnesota Golden Gophers. In the 2015 contest, Minnesota defeated Purdue, 13–41.

Minnesota defeated Purdue 44–31. After a big play-action pass by Minnesota to open the game, Purdue's defense was able to hold Minnesota to a 52-yard field goal by Emmit Carpenter. After a 4th down stop by the Gophers, Rodney Smith took a carry 35-yards for a touchdown and a 10–0 Minnesota lead. Purdue responded on their next drive with a 20-yard Cole Herdman touchdown reception from David Blough. After 3 series of stops by both teams, Blough found Cameron Posey on a slant route, take the pass 89-yards for a touchdown. Minnesota would score again on a 53-yard field goal by Carpenter. Minnesota regained the lead on a 2-yard run by Mitch Leidner. Purdue responded when DeAngelo Yancey took a slant route 60-yards for a touchdown. Minnesota was able to drive into field goal range and added a 28-yard field goal by Carpenter. Purdue decided to attempt to get into scoring range, but after incomplete passes and Minnesota time outs, they punted, giving Minnesota the ball with 15 second remaining. Leidner's first pass of the drive was intercepted by Antonio Blackmon, who was tackled at the 2-yard line with 5 seconds remaining. Purdue used the time left to find Brycen Hopkins for a 2-yard touchdown pass from Blough, giving the Boilermakers a 28–23 halftime lead. Minnesota scored the only points of the 3rd quarter on a 7-yard touchdown run by Smith. Minnesota expanded their lead in the 4th when Leidner scored a touchdown on a 9-yard rush. Purdue was able to get within one score with a 34-yard field goal by J. D. Dellinger with 5:10 remaining. After forcing a Golden Gophers punt, Purdue was driving, when on a 4th and 1 Jack Wegher fumbled giving Minnesota the ball back. Minnesota was able to punch in another touchdown on a 14-yard run by Smith. Purdue continued to attempt a comeback, but ran out of time.

=== Vs. Northwestern ===
Northwestern at Purdue

Team	1	2	3	4	Total
• Wildcats	7	7	21	10	45
Boilermakers	10	0	7	0	17

- Date: November 12
- Location: Ross-Ade Stadium
  West Lafayette, IN
- Game start: 12:02 EST
- Elapsed time: 3:03
- Game attendance: 30,548
- Game weather: 43 °F (6 °C), Sunny, S 6 mph (9.7 km/h)
- Referee: Danie Capron
- TV announcers (BTN): Wayne Randazzo & J Leman

Scoring summary
1	10:53	PUR	J. D. Dellinger 26-yard field goal	PUR 3–0
1	6:10	PUR	David Blough 1-yard run (J. D. Dellinger kick)	PUR 10–0
1	1:56	NW	Austin Carr 2-yard pass from Clayton Thorson (Jack Mitchell kick)	PUR 10–7
2	8:06	NW	Austin Carr 33-yard pass from Clayton Thorson (Jack Mitchell kick)	NW 14–10
3	12:34	NW	Justin Jackson 14-yard run (Jack Mitchell kick)	NW 21–10
3	11:13	NW	Garrett Dickerson 42-yard pass from Clayton Thorson (Jack Mitchell kick)	NW 28–10
3	10:22	PUR	Bilal Marshall 49-yard pass from David Blough (J. D. Dellinger kick)	NW 28–17
3	8:00	NW	Clayton Thorson 2-yard run (Jack Mitchell kick)	NW 35–17
4	14:57	NW	Justin Jackson 9-yard run (Jack Mitchell kick)	NW 42–17
4	6:19	NW	Jack Mitchell 23-yard field goal	NW 45–17

Overall record	Previous meeting	Previous winner
50–29–1	November 14, 2015	Northwestern, 21–14

After facing Minnesota, Purdue hosted the Northwestern Wildcats. In the 2015 contest, Northwestern defeated Purdue, 21–14.

Purdue was defeated 45–17 by the Wildcats. Purdue opened the game driving 61-yards and kicking a 26-yard field goal by J. D. Dellinger to give them an early lead. On Northwestern's first drive, the Wildcats saw it end early when Clayton Thorson's pass was intercepted by C. J. Parker who returned the ball to the Northwestern 33. From there, David Blough was able to lead Purdue to a touchdown, carrying the ball into the endzone himself from 1-yard away. Northwestern punted on their next drive. Blough's third down pass was intercepted by Montre Hartage. Coming off the interception, Thorson found Austin Carr from one yard out for the Wildcat's first score. After an exchanging of punts, Purdue took over at the Northwestern 34, however they turned the ball over on downs. The Wildcats then scored on a 33-yard Carr reception from Thorson, ending the first half scoring. Northwestern scored on a 14-yard run by Justin Jackson to open the second half. Purdue's drive ended short when Blough was intercepted by Anthony Walker. The very next play Thorson found Garrett Dickerson on a 42-yard pass for a touchdown. In response, Purdue took just 3 plays to go 75 yards concluded with a 49-yard touchdown reception by Bilal Marshall from Blough. The next drive for Northwestern ended with a 2-yard Thorson rushing touchdown. After a Purdue punt, Jackson scored again on a 9-yard run. The final score of the game came on a 23-yard Jack Mitchell field goal.

=== Vs. Wisconsin ===
Wisconsin at Purdue

Team	1	2	3	4	Total
• Badgers	0	35	7	7	49
Boilermakers	3	7	3	7	20

- Date: November 19
- Location: Ross-Ade Stadium
  West Lafayette, IN
- Game start: 12:06 p.m. EST
- Elapsed time: 3:07
- Game attendance: 30,465
- Game weather: 37 °F (3 °C), Cloudy, W 24 mph (39 km/h)
- Referee: John O'Neill
- TV announcers (ABC): Mike Patrick, Ed Cunningham & Dr. Jerry Punch

Scoring summary
1	4:56	PUR	J. D. Dellinger 28-yard field goal	PUR 3–0
2	8:34	WIS	Alec Ingold 1-yard run (Andrew Endicott kick)	WIS 7–3
2	8:26	WIS	T. J. Watt 17-yard interception return (Andrew Endicott kick)	WIS 14–3
2	3:03	WIS	Bradrick Shaw 7-yard run (Andrew Endicott kick)	WIS 21–3
2	2:49	WIS	Alec Ingold 19-yard pass from Bart Houston (Andrew Endicott kick)	WIS 28–3
2	2:38	PUR	DeAngelo Yancey 75-yard pass from David Blough (J. D. Dellinger kick)	WIS 28–10
2	0:51	WIS	Bradrick Shaw 33-yard run (Andrew Endicott kick)	WIS 35–10
3	8:47	PUR	J. D. Dellinger 30-yard field goal	WIS 35–13
3	3:23	WIS	Jazz Peavy 25-yard pass from Alex Hornibrook (Andrew Endicott kick)	WIS 42–13
4	7:41	WIS	Corey Clement 6-yard run (Andrew Endicott kick)	WIS 49–13
4	4:15	PUR	DeAngelo Yancey 10-yard pass from David Blough (J. D. Dellinger kick) goal	WIS 49–20

Overall record	Previous meeting	Previous winner
29–45–8	October 17, 2015	Wisconsin, 24–7

Following its game against Northwestern, Purdue played its final home game against Wisconsin. Wisconsin defeated Purdue 7–24 the previous season.

The Boilermakers were beaten by Wisconsin 49–20. Purdue made the first score of the game, and the only score of the first quarter when J. D. Dellinger made a 28-yard field goal. Wisconsin scored their first points of the game halfway through the second quarter when Alec Ingold punched the ball in from the 1-yard line. After the kickoff, Purdue's first play was intercepted by T. J. Watt, who batted a David Blough pass to himself, and returned the ball 17 yards for a touchdown. 5 minutes later, Bradrick Shaw scored for the Badgers on a 7-yard run. After another Blough interception, Bart Houston found Ingold on a 19-yard pass for yet another Wisconsin touchdown, just 14 seconds after their last. Purdue responded when Blough found DeAngelo Yancey streaking down the sideline for a 75-yard touchdown. With 51 second left in the half, Shaw scored again on a 33-yard run to close out the first half scoring with Wisconsin leading 35–10. Purdue opened up the second half scoring when Dellinger hit a 30-yard field goal. Wisconsin increased their lead again when Alex Hornibrook found Jazz Peavy on a 25-yard pass for a touchdown. Wisconsin got their final score on a 6-yard Corey Clement in the fourth quarter. The final score of the game came when Blough found Yancey on a 10-yard fade route.

=== At Indiana ===
Purdue at Indiana
(Old Oaken Bucket)

Team	1	2	3	4	Total
Boilermakers	7	9	6	2	24
• Hoosiers	14	3	0	9	26

- Date: November 26
- Location: Memorial Stadium
  Bloomington, IN
- Game start: 12:02 p.m. EST
- Elapsed time: 3:38
- Game attendance: 43,103
- Game weather: 43 °F (6 °C), Cloudy, W 6 mph (9.7 km/h)
- Referee: Ron Snodgrass
- TV announcers (ESPNU): Anish Shroff & Ahmad D. Brooks

Scoring summary
1	14:12	PUR	Markell Jones 1-yard run (J. D. Dellinger kick)	PUR 7–0
1	12:43	IND	Mitchell Paige 27-yard pass from Richard Lagow (Griffin Oakes kick)	TIE 7–7
1	2:18	IND	Zander Diamont 1-yard run (Griffin Oakes kick)	IND 14–7
2	12:07	PUR	J. D. Dellinger 23-yard field goal	IND 14–10
2	7:36	IND	Griffin Oakes 29-yard field goal	IND 17–10
2	1:50	PUR	Cameron Posey 10-yard pass from David Blough (J. D. Dellinger kick blocked)	IND 17–16
3	11:25	PUR	DeAngelo Yancey 31-yard pass from David Blough (David Blough run failed)	PUR 22–17
4	14:17	IND	Griffin Oakes 46-yard field goal	PUR 22–20
4	4:59	IND	Devine Redding 1-yard run (Griffin Oakes kick failed)	IND 26–22
4	0:01	PUR	Jake Replogle safety	IND 26–24

Overall record	Previous meeting	Previous winner
72–40–6	November 28, 2015	Indiana, 54–36

Following its home finale against Wisconsin, Purdue faced its arch-rivals, the Indiana Hoosiers, in the 118th meeting of "Old Oaken Bucket". In the previous meeting, Indiana defeated Purdue for the third consecutive year, winning 54–36.

The Boilermakers were narrowly defeated by Indiana 26–24. After Markus Bailey intercepted a Richard Lagow pass and returned it to the Indiana one yard line, Purdue opened up the scoring with a 1-yard touchdown run by Markell Jones. Indiana responded on the next drive when Lagow found Mitchell Paige from 27-yards out for a touchdown. Purdue would turn their next possession over on downs, but got the ball back when Lagow was once again intercepted by Bailey. Purdue was forced to punt their next drive, in which Indiana responded with a 1-yard run by Zander Diamont for a touchdown, giving Indiana their first lead of the game. Purdue was able to respond with a 23-yard field goal on their next possession. After an Indiana punt, Blough was intercepted by Jonathan Crawford, who was able to return the ball in Purdue territory, setting up a 29-yard Griffin Oakes field goal. After the two teams exchanged punts, Purdue scored with 1:50 left in the first half on a 10-yard Cameron Posey touchdown from Blough, however Dellinger's point after attempt was blocked, giving Indiana a 17–16 halftime lead. Purdue regained the lead when DeAngelo Yancey scored on a 31-yard pass from Blough, the only score of the 3rd quarter. Indiana's first 4th quarter drive ended with a 46-yard Oakes field goal to draw Indiana within 2 points. After Purdue was forced to punt, Indiana drove 61 yards concluding with a 1-yard touchdown run by Devine Redding to re-gain the lead for the Hoosiers. Blough was able to drive and lead the Boilermakers to the Hoosiers 27-yard line, where on 4th and 14, he was intercepted again by Crawford in the end zone with 1:13 remaining. With two timeouts, Purdue forced a 4th and 3 for the Hoosiers with 11 seconds left. Indiana decided to attempt to run out the clock when Diamont ran backwards into his own end zone where he was tackled by Jake Replogle for a safety, making the score 26–24 with 1 second remaining. On the free kick, Brian Lankford-Johnson's lateral pass was caught by Crawford and he took a knee, sealing Indiana's fourth straight victory over Purdue.

== 2017 NFL draft ==
Rnd.	Pick	Team	Player	Pos.	College	Notes
5	175	Green Bay Packers	DeAngelo Yancey	WR	Purdue	from New England via Cleveland

Purdue extended a program record with 20 consecutive years with an NFL Draft selection. Purdue's only selection of this year came in the fifth round.

== Roster ==
2016 Purdue Boilermakers football team roster
Players
Coaches
Offense

Pos.	#	Name	Class
RB	1	D. J. Knox (injured)	Jr
QB	2	Elijah Sindelar	Fr
WR	3	Bilal Marshall	Sr
WR	5	Domonique Young (injured)	Sr
WR	7	DeAngelo Yancey (C)	Sr
RB	8	Markell Jones	So
RB	9	Malik Kimbrough	Jr
WR	10	Gregory Phillips	Jr
QB	11	David Blough	So
QB	12	Jared Sparks	Fr
WR	13	Terrance Landers	Fr
QB	14	Danny Carollo	Fr
WR	18	Camerson Posey	Sr
QB	19	Aaron Banks	So
WR	20	Benaiah Franklin	Fr
WR	21	Anthony Mahoungou	Jr
RB	22	Jack Wegher	Fr
RB	23	Keyante Green	Jr
RB	25	Tario Fuller	Fr
RB	28	David Yancey	Jr
WR	33	Jackson Anthrop	Fr
RB	36	Richie Worship	Fr
RB	37	Brian Lankford-Johnson	Fr
RB	45	Lane Beeler	So
OL	50	Bearooz Yacoobi	Fr
OL	51	Bryce Brown	Fr
OT	52	Tanner Hawthorne	Fr
G, C	53	Kirk Barron	So
OL	55	Michael Mendez	Fr
OT	58	Emilio Appolloni	Fr
OL	60	Eric Swingler	So
OL	64	Johnny Daniels	Jr
OT	66	Cameron Cermin	Sr
OL	68	Peyton Truitt	Fr
G	70	Jordan Roos (C)	Sr
OL	71	Sam Loebig	Fr
G	72	Jason King	Sr
OL	73	Ryan Flaherty	Fr
OL	74	Martesse Patterson	So
OT	75	Jalen Neal	Jr
OL	77	Eric Ferguson	Fr
OL	78	Grant Hermanns	Fr
OL	79	Matt McCann	Fr
WR	80	Jarrett Burgess	So
TE	82	Wade Buckman	Fr
WR	83	Malcolm Dotson	Fr
TE	84	Jess Trussell	Fr
TE	88	Cole Herdman	So
TE	89	Brycen Hopkins	Fr

Defense

Pos.	#	Name	Class
NB, S	1	Brandon Roberts	So
CB	2	Da'Wan Hunte	Jr
S	3	Leroy Clark	Sr
LB	4	Ja'Whaun Bentley (C)	Jr
S	5	Austin Logan	Sr
CB	6	Myles Norwood	Jr
S	7	Robert Gregory	Sr
CB	8	Kamal Hardy	Jr
DT	9	Lorenzo Neal	Fr
CB	10	Michael Little	Fr
RE	11	Antoine Miles	Jr
DE	13	Gelen Robinson	Jr
DE	14	Tim Faison	Fr
S	15	Andy Chelf	Fr
LB	16	Garret Hudson	Jr
DT	17	Fred Brown	Fr
CB	17	David Day	Fr
DT	18	Eddy Wilson	So
LB	19	Dezwan Polk-Campbell	Jr
CB	20	David Rose	Fr
LB	21	Markus Bailey	So
LB	22	Sawyer Dawson	Fr
CB	23	Josh Hayes	Fr
S	24	Tim Cason	So
CB	25	Antonio Blackmon	So
S	26	C. J. Parker	Jr
S	27	Navon Mosley	Fr
CB	28	Brandon Shuman	Fr
LB	29	Jimmy Herman	Sr
LB	32	Evan Pulliam	Sr
CB	33	Simeon Smiley	Fr
S	35	Wes Cook	Jr
LB	36	Danny Ezechukwu	Jr
S	38	Brennan Theineman	Fr
S	40	Ronnie Hill	Fr
S	41	Jacob Theineman	So
LB	42	Andy James Garcia	Sr
DT	44	Anthony Watts	Fr
RE	45	Austin Larkin	Jr
CB	46	Race Johnson	Jr
DE	47	Shane Henley	Sr
DE	48	Rob Simmons	Jr
DE	49	Mike Zeigler	So
DT	50	Keiwan Jones	So
DT	54	Jake Replogle (C)	Sr
RE	55	Ryan DeBusk	Sr
DE	56	Wyatt Cook	Fr
LB	57	Semisi Fakasiieiki	Fr
DT	59	Langston Newton	Sr
DT	66	Alex Criddle	Fr
DT	90	Will Colmery (injured)	So
RE	91	Chazmyn Turner	Fr
DE	95	Evan Panfil	Sr

Special teams

Pos.	#	Name	Class
P	31	Joe Schopper	So
K	43	Myles Homan	Fr
LS	65	Ben Makowski	So
K	85	J. D. Dellinger	Fr
P	96	Jake Herr	Fr
LS	97	Nelson Arent	Fr

Head coach

- Gerad Parker (Interim Head Coach / (Formerly Wide Receivers) / Recruiting Coordinator)
- Darrell Hazell (Fired October 16, 2016)

Coordinators/assistant coaches

- Ross Els (Defensive Coordinator / Safeties)
- Terry Malone (Offensive Coordinator / Tight Ends)
- Marcus Freeman (Co-Defensive Coordinator / Linebackers)
- Darrell Funk (Offensive Line)
- Taver Johnson (Defensive Backs)
- Tim Lester (Quarterbacks)
- Randy Melvin (Defensive Line)
- DeAndre Smith (Running Backs)
- John Nussman (Wide Receivers)
- Doug Boersma (Assistant Athletics Director – Sports Medicine)
- Duane Carlisle (Director of Sports Performance)
- Andrew Warsaw (Director of Football Operations)
- Mike Waugh (Director of Player Personnel)
- JMichael Jornard (Offensive Graduate Assistant)
- Zach Opsal (Defensive Graduate Assistant)
- Sean Robinson (Defensive Graduate Assistant)
- Justin Sinz (Offensive Graduate Assistant)

Legend

- (C) Team captain
- (S) Suspended
- (I) Ineligible
- Injured
- Redshirt

Roster
Last update: September 8, 2016

== Awards and honors ==
Weekly Awards
Player	Award	Date Awarded	Ref.
J. D. Dellinger	Big Ten Special Teams Player of the Week	October 10, 2016	
Brian Lankford-Johnson	Big Ten Freshman of the Week	October 10, 2016	

All-Big Ten
Player	Selection
DeAngelo Yancey	Third Team (Coaches); Second Team (Media)
Markus Bailey	Honorable Mention (Coaches & Media)
David Blough	Honorable Mention (Coaches)
Evan Panfil	Honorable Mention (Coaches & Media)
Jordan Roos	Honorable Mention (Coaches & Media)
Joe Schopper	Honorable Mention (Coaches & Media)
Jason King	Honorable Mention (Media)
Jake Replogle	Honorable Mention (Media)
