= Gerad Parker =

American football player and coach (born 1981)

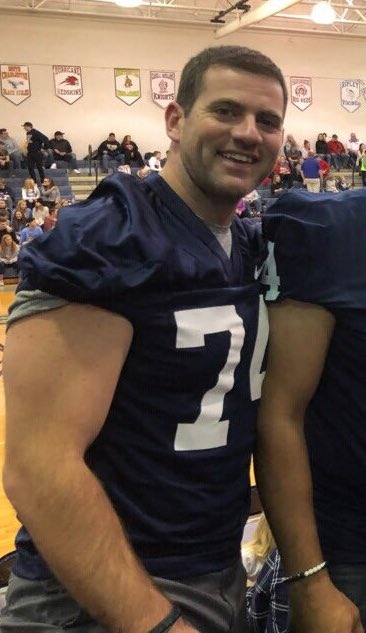

Current position
- Title: Head coach
- Team: Troy
- Conference: Sun Belt
- Record: 16–21

Biographical details
- Born: January 4, 1981 (age 45); Huntington, West Virginia, U.S.

Playing career
- 2000–2004: Kentucky
- Position: Wide receiver

Coaching career (HC unless noted)
- 2005–2006: Raceland-Worthington HS (KY) (WR/DB)
- 2007: Kentucky (GA)
- 2008–2010: UT Martin (PGC/RC)
- 2011–2012: Marshall (WR)
- 2013–2014: Purdue (TE/RC)
- 2015–2016: Purdue (WR/RC)
- 2016: Purdue (interim HC)
- 2017: Duke (OA)
- 2018: Duke (WR)
- 2019: Penn State (WR)
- 2020–2021: West Virginia (OC/WR)
- 2022: Notre Dame (TE)
- 2023: Notre Dame (OC/TE)
- 2024–present: Troy

Head coaching record
- Overall: 16–27
- Bowls: 0–1

Accomplishments and honors

Championships
- Sun Belt East Division (2025)

Gerad Michael Parker (born January 4, 1981) is an American college football coach and former player. He is the head football coach for Troy University, a position he has held since 2024. He was previously the offensive coordinator and tight ends coach at the University of Notre Dame and the offensive coordinator at West Virginia University. Parker played as a wide receiver at the University of Kentucky from 2000 to 2004 for head coaches Hal Mumme, Guy Morriss, and Rich Brooks. He served as the interim head coach at Purdue University for six games in 2016.

== Early life ==
Gerad, a native of Louisa, Kentucky, was born the son of Rick and Laura Parker. Parker graduated from Lawrence County High School, where he was a member of the basketball team, track and field team and the football team as a record-setting wide receiver. As a freshman and sophomore, Parker teamed up with Jason Michael to form one of the best passing attacks in the state of Kentucky. A 2000 graduate, Parker was Kentucky's all-time leader with 4,814 career receiving yards in high school. His 65 receptions, 1,504 receiving yards and 20 touchdowns as a senior made him a finalist for the 1999 Kentucky Mr. Football Award, losing out to eventual teammate Travis Atwell. Parker ran the 400-meter dash, 400-meter relay and 1,600-meter relay for the track and field team.

== College career ==
In January 2000, Parker accepted a scholarship to the University of Kentucky to continue his football career. He chose Kentucky over offers from Marshall and Western Kentucky. During Parker's career at Kentucky, he went through three head coaches, two broken collar bones and a leg injury.

=== Statistics ===
Year	Team	Receiving				
Year	Team	Rec	Yards	Avg	Yds/G	TD
2000	Kentucky	Redshirt				
2001	Kentucky	0	0	--	--	0
2002	Kentucky	0	0	--	--	0
2003	Kentucky	0	0	--	--	0
2004	Kentucky	15	168	11.2	18.6	0
Totals		15	168	11.2	18.6	0

== Coaching career ==
=== Early coaching career ===
Parker coached wide receivers and defensive backs at Raceland-Worthington High School from 2005 to 2006. In 2007 Parker took a graduate assistant job at Kentucky, where he worked with wide receivers and the offensive scout team. The following year Parker was hired by UT Martin, where he was the running backs coach and recruiting coordinator. In 2011, Parker became the wide receivers coach at Marshall.

=== Purdue ===
On February 11, 2013, Parker was hired by Darrell Hazell as the tight ends coach and recruiting coordinator at Purdue University. In 2015, Parker took over as the wide receivers coach and maintained his role as the recruiting coordinator.

Parker mentored standout receiver DeAngelo Yancey during his time at Purdue. Yancey earned second team All-Big Ten honors after recording a career-high 49 receptions for 951 yards and 10 touchdowns in 2016, and wrapped up his four-year collegiate career ranking among the top receivers in Purdue history, finishing with 141 career receptions for 2,344 yards and 20 TDs.

After a loss to Iowa on October 16, 2016, Purdue fired head coach Darrell Hazell and named Parker the interim head coach for the final six weeks of the season.

=== Cincinnati and East Carolina ===
On January 17, 2017, Parker was named the running backs coach at the University of Cincinnati. Parker resigned from Cincinnati the week of February 13, 2017, to become the wide receivers coach at East Carolina University. On February 22, 2017, Parker was arrested and charged with driving under the influence. Because of the arrest, the East Carolina rescinded their offer.

=== Duke ===
On June 1, 2017, Parker was hired by David Cutcliffe and the Duke Blue Devils as a football operations assistant. In 2018, Parker transitioned into an assistant coaching role to mentor Duke's wide receivers. During his one season coaching the Duke wide receivers, the unit combined for 2,252 yards, accounting for 70.4 percent of the Blue Devils’ passing production.

=== Penn State ===
On January 10, 2019, Parker was named the wide receivers coach for the Penn State Nittany Lions, replacing David Corley.

=== West Virginia ===
Before the 2020 season, Parker was hired as the offensive coordinator at West Virginia.

=== Notre Dame ===
After being demoted following West Virginia's hiring of Graham Harrell as offensive coordinator, Parker joined the Notre Dame staff as tight ends coach for the 2022 season. He was named offensive coordinator for the 2023 season.

=== Troy ===
On December 18, 2023, Parker was named the head coach at Troy.

== Head coaching record ==
Year	Team	Overall	Conference	Standing	Bowl/playoffs	Coaches^{#}	AP^{°}
Purdue Boilermakers (Big Ten Conference) (2016)
2016	Purdue	0–6	0–6	7th (West)			
Purdue:		0–6	0–6				
Troy Trojans (Sun Belt Conference) (2024–present)
2024	Troy	4–8	3–5	T–5th (West)			
2025	Troy	8–6	6–2	1st (East)	L Salute to Veterans		
2026	Troy	4–7	2–5	(East)			
Troy:		16–21	11–12				
Total:		16–27					
