= 2016 Jacksonville State Gamecocks football team =

American college football season

2016 Jacksonville State Gamecocks football

OVC champion

NCAA Division I Second Round, L 24–40 vs. Youngstown State
- Conference: Ohio Valley Conference

Ranking
- STATS: No. 6
- FCS Coaches: No. 6
- Record: 10–2 (7–0 OVC)
- Head coach: John Grass (3rd season)
- Co-defensive coordinators: David Blackwell (3rd season); Brandon Hall (3rd season)
- Home stadium: Burgess–Snow Field at JSU Stadium

2016 Ohio Valley Conference football standings
	Conf.			Overall
Team	W		L	W		L
No. 6 Jacksonville State $^	7	–	0	10	–	2
UT Martin	6	–	2	7	–	5
Tennessee Tech	5	–	3	5	–	6
Tennessee State	4	–	3	7	–	4
Eastern Illinois	4	–	4	6	–	5
Murray State	4	–	4	4	–	7
SE Missouri State	3	–	5	3	–	8
Eastern Kentucky	2	–	6	3	–	8
Austin Peay	0	–	8	0	–	11
$ – Conference champion; ^ – FCS playoff participant; Rankings from STATS Poll

The 2016 Jacksonville State Gamecocks football team represented Jacksonville State University as a member of the Ohio Valley Conference (OVC) during the 2016 NCAA Division I FCS football season. Led by third-year head coach John Grass, the Gamecocks compiled an overall record of 10–2 with a mark of 7–0 in conference play, winning the OVC title for the third consecutive season. Jacksonville State received the OVC's automatic bid to the NCAA Division I Football Championship playoffs. After a first-round bye, the Gamecocks lost in the second round to the eventual national runner-up, Youngstown State. The team played home games at Burgess–Snow Field at JSU Stadium in Jacksonville, Alabama. The team played home games at Burgess–Snow Field at JSU Stadium in Jacksonville, Alabama.

== Schedule ==
Date	Time	Opponent	Rank	Site	TV	Result	Attendance
September 1	6:00 pm	No. 15 (D-II) North Alabama*	No. 3	Burgess–Snow Field at JSU Stadium; Jacksonville, AL	WEAC TV-24, OVCDN	W 31–12	22,116
September 10	6:30 pm	at No. 21 (FBS) LSU*	No. 5	Tiger Stadium; Baton Rouge, LA	ESPNU	L 13–34	98,389
September 17	1:00 pm	No. 17 Coastal Carolina*	No. 4	Burgess–Snow Field at JSU Stadium; Jacksonville, AL	WEAC TV-24, OVCDN	W 27–26	14,265
September 24	6:00 pm	at Liberty*	No. 3	Williams Stadium; Lynchburg, VA	ESPN3	W 48–19	15,354
October 8	1:00 pm	Tennessee Tech	No. 3	Burgess–Snow Field at JSU Stadium; Jacksonville, AL	ESPN3	W 40–21	16,092
October 15	1:00 pm	Austin Peay	No. 3	Burgess–Snow Field at JSU Stadium; Jacksonville, AL	WEAC TV-24; OVCDN	W 34–14	14,455
October 22	2:00 pm	at Eastern Kentucky	No. 2	Roy Kidd Stadium; Richmond, KY	OVCDN	W 24–7	11,600
October 29	2:00 pm	No. 23 Eastern Illinois^{†}	No. 2	Burgess–Snow Field at JSU Stadium; Jacksonville, AL	ESPN3	W 47–14	21,655
November 5	1:00 pm	at Southeast Missouri State	No. 2	Houck Stadium; Cape Girardeau, MO	ESPN3	W 17–10	6,839
November 12	1:00 pm	at Murray State	No. 2	Roy Stewart Stadium; Murray, KY	OVCDN	W 33–15	3,220
November 19	1:00 pm	UT Martin	No. 2	Burgess–Snow Field at JSU Stadium; Jacksonville, AL	WEAC TV-24, OVCDN	W 33–7	18,982
December 3	1:00 pm	No. 13 Youngstown State*	No. 2	Burgess–Snow Field at JSU Stadium; Jacksonville, AL (NCAA Division I Second Round)	ESPN3	L 24–40	18,838
*Non-conference game; ^{†}Homecoming; Rankings from STATS Poll released prior to the game; All times are in Central time

== Game summaries ==
=== North Alabama ===
North Alabama @ Jacksonville State

Team	1	2	3	4	Total
#15 (D-II) Lions	0	6	3	3	12
• #3 Gamecocks	14	7	7	3	31

- Date: September 1
- Location: JSU Stadium
  Jacksonville, AL
- Game start: 6:00 PM CDT
- Game attendance: 22,116
- Television network: WEAC TV-24

=== @ LSU ===
Jacksonville State @ LSU

Team	1	2	3	4	Total
#5 Gamecocks	0	10	0	3	13
• #21 (FBS) Tigers	0	27	7	0	34

- Date: September 10
- Location: Tiger Stadium
  Baton Rouge, LA
- Game start: 6:30 PM CDT
- Game attendance: 98,389
- Television network: ESPNU

=== Coastal Carolina ===
Coastal Carolina @ Jacksonville State

Team	1	2	3	4	Total
#17 Chanticleers	3	9	6	8	26
• #4 Gamecocks	7	6	7	7	27

- Date: September 17
- Location: JSU Stadium
  Jacksonville, AL
- Game start: 1:00 PM CDT
- Game attendance: 14,265
- Television network: OVCDN

=== @ Liberty ===
Jacksonville State @ Liberty

Team	1	2	3	4	Total
• #3 Gamecocks	14	13	0	21	48
Flames	3	0	7	9	19

- Date: September 24
- Location: Williams Stadium
  Lynchburg, VA
- Game start: 6:00 PM CDT
- Game attendance: 15,354
- Television network: ESPN3

=== Tennessee Tech ===
Tennessee Tech @ Jacksonville State

Team	1	2	3	4	Total
Golden Eagles	0	7	7	7	21
• #3 Gamecocks	17	16	7	0	40

- Date: October 8
- Location: JSU Stadium
  Jacksonville, AL
- Game start: 1:00 PM CDT
- Game attendance: 16,092
- Television network: ESPN3

=== Austin Peay ===
Austin Peay @ Jacksonville State

Team	1	2	3	4	Total
Governors	0	7	0	7	14
• #3 Gamecocks	7	7	13	7	34

- Date: October 15
- Location: Tucker Stadium
  Cookeville, TN
- Game start: 1:00 PM CDT
- Game attendance: 14,455
- Television network: WEAC TV-24

=== @ Eastern Kentucky ===
Jacksonville State @ Eastern Kentucky

Team	1	2	3	4	Total
• #2 Gamecocks	0	14	3	7	24
Colonels	0	0	7	0	7

- Date: October 22
- Location: Roy Kidd Stadium
  Richmond, KY
- Game start: 2:00 PM CDT
- Game attendance: 11,600
- Television network: OVCDN

=== Eastern Illinois ===
Eastern Illinois @ Jacksonville State

Team	1	2	3	4	Total
#23 Panthers	0	7	0	7	14
• #2 Gamecocks	21	10	9	7	47

- Date: October 29
- Location: JSU Stadium
  Jacksonville, AL
- Game start: 2:00 PM CDT
- Game attendance: 21,655
- Television network: ESPN3

=== @ Southeast Missouri State ===
Jacksonville State @ Southeast Missouri State

Team	1	2	3	4	Total
• #2 Gamecocks	7	10	0	0	17
Redhawks	0	0	7	3	10

- Date: November 5
- Location: Houck Stadium
  Cape Girardeau, MO
- Game start: 1:00 PM CDT
- Game attendance: 6,839
- Television network: ESPN3

=== @ Murray State ===
Jacksonville State @ Murray State

Team	1	2	3	4	Total
• #2 Gamecocks	0	7	6	20	33
Racers	0	3	0	12	15

- Date: November 12
- Location: Roy Stewart Stadium
  Murray, KY
- Game start: 1:00 PM CST
- Game attendance: 3,220
- Television network: OVCDN

=== UT Martin ===
UT Martin @ Jacksonville State

Team	1	2	3	4	Total
Skyhawks	0	0	7	0	7
• #2 Gamecocks	12	7	7	7	33

- Date: November 19
- Location: JSU Stadium
  Jacksonville, AL
- Game start: 1:00 PM CST
- Game attendance: 18,982
- Television network: WEAC TV-24

=== Youngstown State—NCAA Division I Second Round ===
Youngstown State @ Jacksonville State

Team	1	2	3	4	Total
• #13 Penguins	17	3	14	6	40
#2 Gamecocks	7	10	7	0	24

- Date: December 3
- Location: JSU Stadium
  Jacksonville, AL
- Game start: 1:00 PM CST
- Game attendance: 18,838
- Television network: ESPN3

== Ranking movements ==
Ranking movements Legend: ██ Increase in ranking ██ Decrease in ranking ( ) = First-place votes
	Week													
Poll	Pre	1	2	3	4	5	6	7	8	9	10	11	12	Final
STATS FCS	3 (4)	5 (1)	4	3	3	3	3	2 (19)	2 (16)	2 (15)	2 (19)	2 (18)	2 (15)	6
Coaches	3	5	6	4	4	4	4	2 (2)	2 (2)	2 (2)	2 (2)	2 (2)	2 (2)	6
FCS Playoffs	Not released									1	1	3	Not released	
