= 2016 Murray State Racers football team =

American college football season

2016 Murray State Racers football
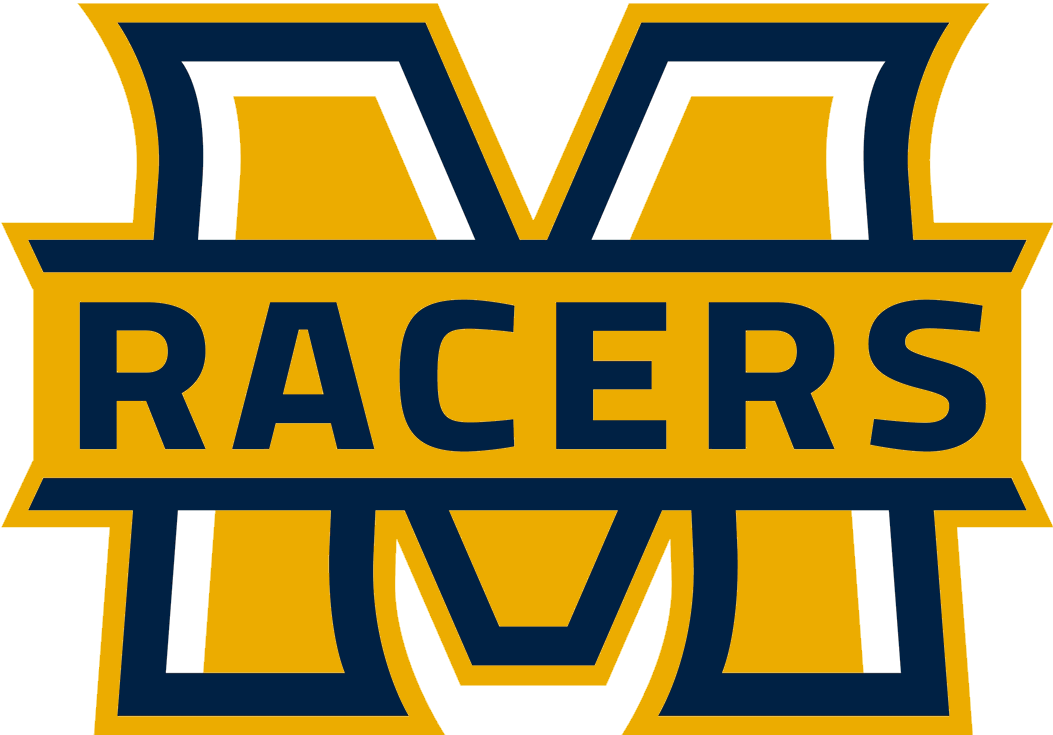
- Conference: Ohio Valley Conference
- Record: 4–7 (4–4 OVC)
- Head coach: Mitch Stewart (2nd season)
- Defensive coordinator: Chris Boone
- Home stadium: Roy Stewart Stadium

2016 Ohio Valley Conference football standings
	Conf.			Overall
Team	W		L	W		L
No. 6 Jacksonville State $^	7	–	0	10	–	2
UT Martin	6	–	2	7	–	5
Tennessee Tech	5	–	3	5	–	6
Tennessee State	4	–	3	7	–	4
Eastern Illinois	4	–	4	6	–	5
Murray State	4	–	4	4	–	7
SE Missouri State	3	–	5	3	–	8
Eastern Kentucky	2	–	6	3	–	8
Austin Peay	0	–	8	0	–	11
$ – Conference champion; ^ – FCS playoff participant; Rankings from STATS Poll

The 2016 Murray State Racers football team represented Murray State University in the 2016 NCAA Division I FCS football season. They were led by second-year head coach Mitch Stewart and played their home games at Roy Stewart Stadium. They were members of the Ohio Valley Conference. They finished the season 4–7, 4–4 in OVC play to finish in a tie for fifth place.

== Schedule ==
Date	Time	Opponent	Site	TV	Result	Attendance
September 3	2:30 pm	at Illinois*	Memorial Stadium; Champaign, IL	BTN	L 3–52	48,644
September 10	6:00 pm	Missouri State*	Roy Stewart Stadium; Murray, KY	OVCDN	L 22–28	5,063
September 17	6:00 pm	at Southern Illinois*	Saluki Stadium; Carbondale, IL	ESPN3	L 17–50	11,150
September 24	6:00 pm	Southeast Missouri State	Roy Stewart Stadium; Murray, KY	ESPN3	L 16–17	10,014
October 1	4:00 pm	at Austin Peay	Fortera Stadium; Clarksville, TN (Battle of the Border)	OVCDN	W 45–17	4,717
October 15	6:00 pm	Tennessee–Martin	Roy Stewart Stadium; Murray, KY	OVCDN	L 31–38	3,938
October 22	1:00 pm	at No. 15 Eastern Illinois	O'Brien Stadium; Charleston, IL	OVCDN	W 40–38	7,907
October 29	3:00 pm	No. 25 Tennessee State^{†}	Roy Stewart Stadium; Murray, KY	OVCDN	W 38–31	8,605
November 5	12:00 pm	at Eastern Kentucky	Roy Kidd Stadium; Richmond, KY	OVCDN	W 41–28	4,200
November 12	1:00 pm	No. 2 Jacksonville State	Roy Stewart Stadium; Murray, KY	OVCDN	L 15–33	3,220
November 19	1:30 pm	at Tennessee Tech	Tucker Stadium; Cookeville, TN	OVCDN	L 19–55	4,120
*Non-conference game; ^{†}Homecoming; Rankings from STATS Poll released prior to the game; All times are in Central time

- Source: Schedule

== Game summaries ==
=== At Illinois ===
	1	2	3	4	Total
Racers	0	3	0	0	3
Fighting Illini	14	21	7	10	52

=== Missouri State ===
	1	2	3	4	Total
Bears	7	14	0	7	28
Racers	3	10	6	3	22

=== At Southern Illinois ===
	1	2	3	4	Total
Racers	10	0	0	7	17
Salukis	24	14	6	6	50

=== Southeast Missouri State ===
	1	2	3	4	Total
Redhawks	7	0	3	7	17
Racers	7	0	6	3	16

=== At Austin Peay ===
	1	2	3	4	Total
Racers	3	21	7	14	45
Governors	3	7	7	0	17

=== Tennessee–Martin ===
	1	2	3	4	Total
Skyhawks	20	7	0	11	38
Racers	7	14	0	10	31

=== At Eastern Illinois ===
	1	2	3	4	Total
Racers	3	13	6	18	40
#15 Panthers	21	0	3	14	38

=== Tennessee State ===
	1	2	3	4	Total
#25 Tigers	3	17	0	11	31
Racers	14	3	14	7	38

=== At Eastern Kentucky ===
	1	2	3	4	Total
Racers	0	7	21	13	41
Colonels	8	10	2	8	28

=== Jacksonville State ===
	1	2	3	4	Total
#2 Gamecocks	0	7	6	20	33
Racers	0	3	0	12	15

=== At Tennessee Tech ===
	1	2	3	4	Total
Racers	0	6	0	13	19
Golden Eagles	13	21	7	14	55
