= 2016 Austin Peay Governors football team =

American college football season

2016 Austin Peay Governors football
- Conference: Ohio Valley Conference
- Record: 0–11 (0–8 OVC)
- Head coach: Will Healy (1st season)
- Offensive coordinator: Wesley Satterfield (1st season)
- Defensive coordinator: Marcus West (1st season)
- Home stadium: Fortera Stadium

2016 Ohio Valley Conference football standings
	Conf.			Overall
Team	W		L	W		L
No. 6 Jacksonville State $^	7	–	0	10	–	2
UT Martin	6	–	2	7	–	5
Tennessee Tech	5	–	3	5	–	6
Tennessee State	4	–	3	7	–	4
Eastern Illinois	4	–	4	6	–	5
Murray State	4	–	4	4	–	7
SE Missouri State	3	–	5	3	–	8
Eastern Kentucky	2	–	6	3	–	8
Austin Peay	0	–	8	0	–	11
$ – Conference champion; ^ – FCS playoff participant; Rankings from STATS Poll

The 2016 Austin Peay Governors football team represented Austin Peay State University during the 2016 NCAA Division I FCS football season. The Governors were led by first-year head coach Will Healy, played their home games at Fortera Stadium, and were members of the Ohio Valley Conference. They finished the season 0–11, 0–8 in OVC play to finish in last place. This was the third time in the last four seasons that the Governors went winless. They are 1–45 since 2013 and have lost 27 consecutive games. Their last win came against Murray State in 2014.

== Schedule ==
Date	Time	Opponent	Site	TV	Result	Attendance
September 3	5:00 pm	at Troy*	Veterans Memorial Stadium; Troy, AL	ESPN3	L 17–57	18,885
September 10	6:00 pm	Tennessee Tech	Fortera Stadium; Clarksville, TN (Sgt. York Trophy)	OVCDN	L 7–41	7,507
September 24	1:00 pm	at No. 18 Eastern Illinois	O'Brien Stadium; Charleston, IL	OVCDN	L 35–56	6,169
October 1	4:00 pm	Murray State	Fortera Stadium; Clarksville, TN (Battle of the Border)	OVCDN	L 17–45	4,717
October 8	2:00 pm	at Tennessee–Martin	Graham Stadium; Martin, TN (Sgt. York Trophy)	OVCDN	L 31–45	5,130
October 15	1:00 pm	at No. 3 Jacksonville State	JSU Stadium; Jacksonville, AL	OVCDN	L 14–34	14,455
October 22	4:00 pm	Mercer*^{†}	Fortera Stadium; Clarksville, TN	OVCDN	L 34–41	6,506
October 29	1:00 pm	at Southeast Missouri State	Houck Stadium; Cape Girardeau, MO	OVCDN	L 21–41	4,328
November 5	4:00 pm	Tennessee State	Fortera Stadium; Clarksville, TN (Sgt. York Trophy)	OVCDN	L 40–41	6,041
November 12	4:00 pm	Eastern Kentucky	Fortera Stadium; Clarksville, TN	OVCDN	L 30–67	5,816
November 19	3:30 pm	at Kentucky*	Commonwealth Stadium; Lexington, KY	SECN	L 13–49	48,948
*Non-conference game; ^{†}Homecoming; Rankings from STATS Poll released prior to the game; All times are in Central time

== Game summaries ==
=== At Troy ===
	1	2	3	4	Total
Governors	7	7	3	0	17
Trojans	13	17	14	13	57

=== Tennessee Tech ===
	1	2	3	4	Total
Golden Eagles	14	14	7	6	41
Governors	0	0	7	0	7

=== At Eastern Illinois ===
	1	2	3	4	Total
Governors	0	14	7	14	35
#18 Panthers	14	7	14	21	56

=== Murray State ===
	1	2	3	4	Total
Racers	3	21	7	14	45
Governors	3	7	7	0	17

=== At Tennessee–Martin ===
	1	2	3	4	Total
Governors	7	0	3	21	31
Skyhawks	14	17	7	7	45

=== At Jacksonville State ===
	1	2	3	4	Total
Governors	0	7	0	7	14
#3 Gamecocks	7	7	13	7	34

=== Mercer ===
	1	2	3	4	Total
Bears	14	10	3	14	41
Governors	0	6	0	28	34

=== At Southeast Missouri State ===
	1	2	3	4	Total
Governors	0	0	14	7	21
Redhawks	10	7	21	3	41

=== Tennessee State ===
	1	2	3	4	Total
Tigers	13	7	14	7	41
Governors	9	10	7	14	40

=== Eastern Kentucky ===
	1	2	3	4	Total
Colonels	11	28	7	21	67
Governors	0	14	13	3	30

=== At Kentucky ===
	1	2	3	4	Total
Governors	7	6	0	0	13
Wildcats	0	21	21	7	49
