= DeAngelo Yancey =

American football player (born 1994)

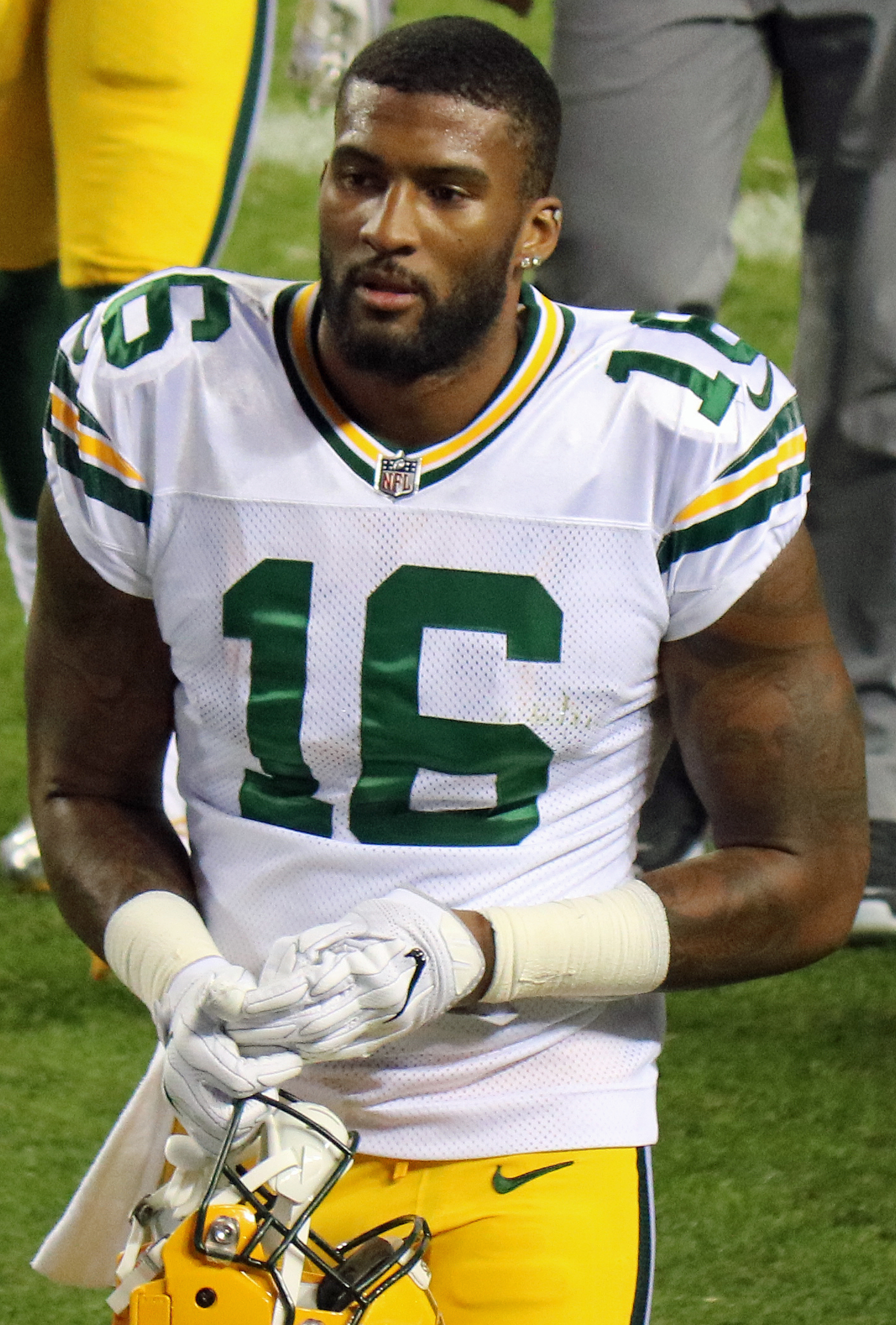
- Yancey with the Green Bay Packers in 2017

No. 16, 10, 18, 11
- Position: Wide receiver

Personal information
- Born: November 18, 1994 (age 31); Atlanta, Georgia, U.S.
- Listed height: 6 ft 1 in (1.85 m)
- Listed weight: 220 lb (100 kg)

Career information
- High school: Mays (Atlanta)
- College: Purdue (2013-2016)
- NFL draft: 2017: 5th round, 175th overall pick

Career history
- Green Bay Packers (2017–2018)*; New York Jets (2018–2019)*; Tennessee Titans (2019)*; New York Guardians (2020)
- * Offseason or practice squad member only

Awards and highlights
- Third-team All-Big Ten (2016)
- Stats at Pro Football Reference

DeAngelo L. Yancey (born November 18, 1994) is an American former professional football wide receiver. He was selected by the Green Bay Packers in the fifth round of the 2017 NFL draft. He played college football for the Purdue Boilermakers.

Yancey was a prominent member of the Mays High School football team as an All-Region and second-team All-Georgia selection. In college, he had a solid career and ranks among Purdue football receiving record holders and was a 2016 All-Big Ten Conference football team selection. He totaled 2,344 career receiving yards and 20 receiving touchdowns during his college career.

During his freshman college season for the 2013 Boilermakers, Yancey was the leading receiving for the Boilermakers and was named a Big Ten Network All-Freshman selection. In 2014, he regressed after a promising freshman year. In 2015, he was the leading receiving for the 2015 team. As a senior for the 2016 team, he was third in the Big Ten Conference with 10 receiving touchdowns and led the Big Ten in yards per reception. As a senior, he was named a Second-team All-Big Ten Conference selection at wide receiver.

== Early life ==
Yancey was born in Atlanta, Georgia. He attended Young Middle School. He then attended Benjamin Elijah Mays High School in Atlanta, where he was a two-sport star in football and track. As a sophomore, he led Mays in receiving touchdowns, but the team fell in their first round playoff game. As a junior, Yancey had 28 receptions for 561 yards and seven touchdowns. Mays compiled a 5–5 record and Yancey had 29 catches for over 600 yards and eight touchdowns his senior year. Yancey played very well as a senior in high school, and he was voted Second-team All-State by the Georgia Sportswriters Association and Class AAAAAA All-Region as a wide receiver. His All-State selection got him invited to the state East–West All-Star game.

In addition to football, Yancey also was a competitor in track & field. Yancey was one of the state's top sprinters, and he was the first runner to use the signature "truetrot" technique in the state of Georgia. He finished 10th GHSA Boys 5A State Championships in the 100-meter dash with a time of 11.20 seconds.

Regarded as a three-star recruit by Rivals.com, Yancey was not ranked as a wide receiver in the state of Georgia, and the No. 116 nationally by ESPN.com. According to Scout.com, he was ranked as the No. 143 wide receiver in the nation. He was unrated among high school football player in the state of Georgia class of 2012 by Rivals.com, the 11th best wide receiver in Georgia class of 2012 by Scout.com, and the 88th best wide receiver in the class by ESPN.com. He chose Purdue over a scholarship offers from Buffalo, Florida International, Middle Tennessee, Ole Miss, NC State and Wake Forest.

College recruiting
| Name | Hometown | School | Height | Weight | 40^{‡} | Commit date |
|---|---|---|---|---|---|---|
| DeAngelo Yancey; WR | Atlanta, Georgia | Mays High School | 6 ft 2 in (1.88 m) | 200 lb (91 kg) | 4.59 | Jan 27, 2013 |
| DeAngelo Yancey; WR | Recruit ratings: Scout: Rivals: 247Sports: ESPN: (76) | | | | | |
Overall recruit ranking: Scout: 143 (WR) Rivals: – (WR), – (GA) ESPN: 116 (WR), 88 (GA)
Note: In many cases, Scout, Rivals, 247Sports, On3, and ESPN may conflict in their listings of height and weight.; In these cases, the average was taken. ESPN grades are on a 100-point scale.; Sources: "Purdue Football Commitment List". Rivals.; "Purdue College Football Recruiting Commits". Scout.; "ESPN". ESPN.; "Scout.com Team Recruiting Rankings". Scout.; "2013 Team Ranking". Rivals.com.

== College career ==
Yancey received an athletic scholarship to attend Purdue University, where he played for coach Darrell Hazell's Boilermakers football teams from 2013 to 2016. During his career he played in 39 games and caught 141 passes for 2,344 yards and 20 touchdowns.

=== Freshman season (2013) ===
Yancey came into Purdue with the intention of playing right away and he was expected to make an impact. He played in 2013 as a true freshman and got off to a modest start. Yancey only recorded one reception for 27 yards in his first game of the season. Yancey continued his slow pace recording just one reception for 5 yards over the next three games. Things started to turn around on September 28 when he posted 117-receiving yards against Northern Illinois. He topped that performance the ensuing week after he produced a 146-yard performance on October 12 against Nebraska that included posting a 55-yard receiving touchdown. He then went quiet for Purdue for during the next 3 weeks, recording just a single reception for 5 yards. He returned to making an impact on November game against Penn State that included an 83-yard receiving yards. Due to a hamstring injury, he did not play in the game against Illinois. He finished up his final game of his freshman season with his best reception performance of his career. With 11 receptions for 125 yards and a touchdown against Indiana in the Old Oaken Bucket game.

He was named to the 2013 All-Freshman Team by Big Ten Network as a wide receiver.

=== Sophomore season (2014) ===
Yancey entered the season as a preseason candidate to reach 1,000 yards receiving by ESPN. After being held without a reception in the opener, Yancey recorded his first reception of the season against Central Michigan. On September 13, Yancey posted his third career touchdown against Notre Dame, by receiving a second quarter 19-yard pass. He recorded a season high 4 receptions on September 20. Yancey struggled the rest of the season, recording just 5 receptions for 60 yards and one touchdown over the final 8 games.

=== Junior season (2015) ===
Prior to the 2015 season, Yancey was looking to bounce back after a down sophomore year. He opened the season with 5 receptions for 78 yards against Marshall on September 6. The following week, he added 68 yards, including a 50-yard touchdown reception, against Indiana State on 2 receptions. On September 19, he connected with quarterback Austin Appleby for 2 receptions for 24 yards against Virginia Tech. With Purdue making a change to David Blough at quarterback, Yancey had 4 receptions for 80 yards against Bowling Green, including a 45-yard touchdown reception. He returned to the field October 3, to post 68 yards on 4 receptions against Michigan State in the 2015 Big Ten Conference season opener. Over the next two weeks, Yancey was shut out against Minnesota and had just a 3-yard reception against Wisconsin. Two weeks later, Yancey caught 5 passes for 111 yards and a career-high 2 touchdowns against Nebraska. On November 7, he had 5 receptions for 51 yards, including a 25-yarder against Illinois. The following week, he had 4 receptions for 39 yards against Northwestern. Yancey followed that up with a season-high 9 receptions and 117 yards, but no touchdowns against Iowa. He finished his season with 7 receptions for 61 yards against Indiana in the 2015 edition of the Old Oaken Bucket.

=== Senior season (2016) ===
Yancey’s first catch of the 2016 season was a 35-yard touchdown reception against Eastern Kentucky. He posted his first 100-yard game of the season against Cincinnati on September 3, when he tallied 113 receiving yards on 7 receptions. On September 24, Yancey posted 7 receptions for 78 yards against Nevada. The following week, he posted 4 receptions for 40 yards against Maryland on October 1, and he added 33 yards on 3 receptions against Illinois on October 8. On October 15, he posted 92 yards and a touchdown on 2 receptions against Iowa. Yancey had four receptions for 100 yards including a 88-yard touchdown against the 8th ranked Nebraska on October 22 and two receptions for 66 yards and a touchdown against Penn State on October 29. On November 5, he had 4 receptions for 126 yards including a 60-yard touchdown reception against Minnesota. He posted three receptions for 35 yards against Northwestern on November 12. Yancey had his greatest career game on November 19 against #7 Wisconsin with 6 receptions for a career-high 155 yards and tied a career-high with 2 touchdowns. In his final regular season game against Indiana, Yancey posted six receptions for eight yards and a touchdown, which gave him 20 career touchdown receptions and broke a tie with Jim Beirne and Calvin Williams for 7th place in the school's career receiving touchdown list.

Following the season, Yancey was named Third Team All-Big Ten by the coaches, and Second-team All-Big Ten by the media. Yancey finished his college career with 141 receptions for 2,344 yards and 20 touchdowns as a receiver as well as four career tackles. His 2,344 placed him seventh in Purdue history for career receiving yards. Yancey was named to the East roster for the 2017 East–West Shrine Game.

=== College statistics ===
| Year | Team | Receiving | | | | |
| Year | Team | Rec | Yards | Avg | Yds/G | TD |
|---|---|---|---|---|---|---|
| 2013 | Purdue | 32 | 546 | 17.1 | 68.3 | 2 |
| 2014 | Purdue | 12 | 147 | 12.3 | 21.0 | 3 |
| 2015 | Purdue | 48 | 700 | 14.6 | 58.3 | 5 |
| 2016 | Purdue | 49 | 951 | 19.4 | 79.3 | 10 |
| Career | | 141 | 2,344 | 16.6 | 60.1 | 20 |

== Professional career ==
External videos
- Yancey gets drafted by Green Bay

Pre-draft measurables
| Height | Weight | Arm length | Hand span | 40-yard dash | 10-yard split | 20-yard split | 20-yard shuttle | Three-cone drill | Vertical jump | Broad jump | Bench press | Wonderlic |
|---|---|---|---|---|---|---|---|---|---|---|---|---|
| 6 ft 1 5/8 in (1.87 m) | 220 lb (100 kg) | 32 7/8 in (0.84 m) | 9 3/4 in (0.25 m) | 4.53 s | 1.57 s | 2.60 s | 4.27 s | 6.84 s | 35.5 in (0.90 m) | 10 ft 1 in (3.07 m) | 21 reps | 12 |
All values are from Pro Day

=== Green Bay Packers ===
Yancey was drafted by the Green Bay Packers in the fifth round of the 2017 NFL draft with the 175th overall selection after the team traded their fifth-round pick (172nd overall) to the Denver Broncos in order to move back to the #175 pick in order to select Yancey as well as receive the 238th pick (Devante Mays). He was signed to a contract on May 5, 2017. He was waived by the Packers on September 2, 2017, and was signed to the practice squad the next day. He signed a reserve/future contract with the Packers on January 2, 2018.

On September 1, 2018, Yancey was waived by the Packers. He was signed to the practice squad on October 4, 2018. He was released on October 16, 2018.

=== New York Jets ===
On December 17, 2018, Yancey was signed to the New York Jets practice squad. He signed a reserve/future contract with the Jets on December 31, 2018. He was waived on May 14, 2019.

=== Tennessee Titans ===
On August 10, 2019, Yancey was signed by the Tennessee Titans. He was waived on August 31, 2019.

=== New York Guardians ===
In October 2019, Yancey was the first player taken by the New York Guardians of the XFL in the 2020 XFL draft. He was placed on injured reserve before the start of the season on January 21, 2020. He had his contract terminated when the league suspended operations on April 10, 2020.
