= 2016 UT Martin Skyhawks football team =

American college football season

2016 UT Martin Skyhawks football
- Conference: Ohio Valley Conference
- Record: 7–5 (6–2 OVC)
- Head coach: Jason Simpson (11th season)
- Offensive coordinator: Kevin Bannon (1st season)
- Defensive coordinator: Jeff Byrd (5th season)
- Home stadium: Graham Stadium

2016 Ohio Valley Conference football standings
	Conf.			Overall
Team	W		L	W		L
No. 6 Jacksonville State $^	7	–	0	10	–	2
UT Martin	6	–	2	7	–	5
Tennessee Tech	5	–	3	5	–	6
Tennessee State	4	–	3	7	–	4
Eastern Illinois	4	–	4	6	–	5
Murray State	4	–	4	4	–	7
SE Missouri State	3	–	5	3	–	8
Eastern Kentucky	2	–	6	3	–	8
Austin Peay	0	–	8	0	–	11
$ – Conference champion; ^ – FCS playoff participant; Rankings from STATS Poll

The 2016 UT Martin Skyhawks football team represented the University of Tennessee at Martin as a member of the Ohio Valley Conference (OVC) during the 2016 NCAA Division I FCS football season. Led by 11th-year head coach Jason Simpson, the Skyhawks compiled an overall record of 7–5 with a mark of 6–2 in conference play, placing second in the OVC. UT Martin played home games at Graham Stadium in Martin, Tennessee.

== Schedule ==
Date	Time	Opponent	Site	TV	Result	Attendance
September 1	6:00 pm	at Cincinnati*	Nippert Stadium; Cincinnati, OH	ESPN3	L 7–28	28,520
September 10	11:00 pm	at Hawaii*	Aloha Stadium; Halawa, HI	CI	L 36–41	23,900
September 17	2:00 pm	Bacone*	Graham Stadium; Martin, TN	OVCDN	W 84–6	4,037
September 24	2:00 pm	Tennessee Tech	Graham Stadium; Martin, TN (Sgt. York Trophy)	OVCDN	W 44–23	7,316
October 1	2:00 pm	at Tennessee State	Hale Stadium; Nashville, TN (Sgt. York Trophy)	ESPN3	L 30–34	10,001
October 8	2:00 pm	Austin Peay^{†}	Graham Stadium; Martin, TN (Sgt. York Trophy)	OVCDN	W 45–31	5,130
October 15	6:00 pm	at Murray State	Roy Stewart Stadium; Murray, KY	OVCDN	W 38–31	3,938
October 22	3:30 pm	at Georgia State*	Georgia Dome; Atlanta, GA	ESPN3	L 6–31	15,223
October 29	2:00 pm	Eastern Kentucky	Graham Stadium; Martin, TN	OVCDN	W 33–3	3,025
November 5	1:00 pm	at Eastern Illinois	O'Brien Field; Charleston, IL	OVCDN	W 33–17	3,054
November 12	2:00 pm	Southeast Missouri State	Graham Stadium; Martin, TN	OVCDN	W 24–10	3,146
November 19	1:00 pm	at No. 2 Jacksonville State	Burgess–Snow Field at JSU Stadium; Jacksonville, AL	OVCDN	L 7–33	18,982
*Non-conference game; ^{†}Homecoming; Rankings from STATS Poll released prior to the game; All times are in Central time

== Game summaries ==
=== At Cincinnati ===
	1	2	3	4	Total
Skyhawks	7	0	0	0	7
Bearcats	0	6	8	14	28

=== At Hawaii ===
	1	2	3	4	Total
Skyhawks	10	7	7	12	36
Rainbow Warriors	7	7	14	13	41

=== Bacone ===
	1	2	3	4	Total
Warriors	6	0	0	0	6
Skyhawks	28	35	7	14	84

=== Tennessee Tech ===
	1	2	3	4	Total
Golden Eagles	6	3	0	14	23
Skyhawks	7	14	7	16	44

=== At Tennessee State ===
	1	2	3	4	Total
Skyhawks	16	0	0	14	30
Tigers	0	10	7	17	34

=== Austin Peay ===
	1	2	3	4	Total
Governors	7	0	3	21	31
Skyhawks	14	17	7	7	45

=== At Murray State ===
	1	2	3	4	Total
Skyhawks	20	7	0	11	38
Racers	7	14	0	10	31

=== At Georgia State ===
	1	2	3	4	Total
Skyhawks	0	3	0	3	6
Panthers	7	3	14	7	31

=== Eastern Kentucky ===
	1	2	3	4	Total
Colonels	3	0	0	0	3
Skyhawks	7	14	6	6	33

=== At Eastern Illinois ===
	1	2	3	4	Total
Skyhawks	6	7	3	17	33
Panthers	0	7	3	7	17

=== Southeast Missouri State ===
	1	2	3	4	Total
Redhawks	0	7	0	3	10
Skyhawks	3	7	7	7	24

=== At Jacksonville State ===
	1	2	3	4	Total
Skyhawks	0	0	7	0	7
#2 Gamecocks	12	7	7	7	33
