= 2016 Tennessee State Tigers football team =

American college football season

2016 Tennessee State Tigers football
- Conference: Ohio Valley Conference
- Record: 7–4 (4–3 OVC)
- Head coach: Rod Reed (7th season)
- Offensive coordinator: Jeff Parker (2nd season)
- Defensive coordinator: Osita Alaribe (6th season)
- Home stadium: Nissan Stadium; Hale Stadium

2016 Ohio Valley Conference football standings
	Conf.			Overall
Team	W		L	W		L
No. 6 Jacksonville State $^	7	–	0	10	–	2
UT Martin	6	–	2	7	–	5
Tennessee Tech	5	–	3	5	–	6
Tennessee State	4	–	3	7	–	4
Eastern Illinois	4	–	4	6	–	5
Murray State	4	–	4	4	–	7
SE Missouri State	3	–	5	3	–	8
Eastern Kentucky	2	–	6	3	–	8
Austin Peay	0	–	8	0	–	11
$ – Conference champion; ^ – FCS playoff participant; Rankings from STATS Poll

The 2016 Tennessee State Tigers football team represented Tennessee State University as a member of the Ohio Valley Conference (OVC) in the 2016 NCAA Division I FCS football season. They were led by seventh-year head coach Rod Reed and played their home games at Nissan Stadium and Hale Stadium. Tennessee State finished the season 7–4 overall and 4–3 in OVC play to place fourth in the conference.

== Schedule ==
Date	Time	Opponent	Rank	Site	TV	Result	Attendance
September 3	6:00 pm	Arkansas–Pine Bluff*		Nissan Stadium; Nashville, TN (John Merritt Classic)	OVCDN	W 44–0	15,078
September 10	6:00 pm	vs. Jackson State*		Liberty Bowl Memorial Stadium; Memphis, TN (Southern Heritage Classic)	FSS	W 40–26	46,263
September 17	3:00 pm	at Bethune–Cookman*		Municipal Stadium; Daytona Beach, FL	CEN	W 31–24	9,385
October 1	2:00 pm	UT Martin		Hale Stadium; Nashville, TN (Sgt. York Trophy)	ESPN3	W 34–30	10,001
October 8	6:00 pm	at No. 19 Eastern Illinois		O'Brien Field; Charleston, IL	OVCDN	L 34–35	4,319
October 15	6:00 pm	Eastern Kentucky^{†}		Nissan Stadium; Nashville, TN	ESPN3	W 35–28	21,053
October 22	6:30 pm	at Vanderbilt*	No. 25	Vanderbilt Stadium; Nashville, TN	ESPNU	L 17–35	31,084
October 29	3:00 pm	at Murray State	No. 25	Roy Stewart Stadium; Murray, KY	OVCDN	L 31–38	8,605
November 5	4:00 pm	at Austin Peay		Governors Stadium; Clarksville, TN	OVCDN	W 41–40	6,041
November 12	3:00 pm	Tennessee Tech		Hale Stadium; Nashville, TN	OVCDN	L 16–44	8,981
November 19	1:00 pm	at Southeast Missouri State		Houck Stadium; Cape Girardeau, MO	OVCDN	W 32–31	3,117
*Non-conference game; ^{†}Homecoming; Rankings from STATS Poll released prior to the game; All times are in Central time

== Game summaries ==
=== Arkansas–Pine Bluff ===
	1	2	3	4	Total
Golden Lions	0	0	0	0	0
Tigers	3	17	17	7	44

=== Vs. Jackson State ===
	1	2	3	4	Total
JSU Tigers	13	10	3	0	26
TSU Tigers	13	6	14	7	40

=== At Bethune-Cookman ===
	1	2	3	4	Total
Tigers	3	14	7	7	31
Wildcats	7	10	0	7	24

=== Tennessee–Martin ===
	1	2	3	4	Total
Skyhawks	16	0	0	14	30
Tigers	0	10	7	17	34

=== At Eastern Illinois ===
	1	2	3	4	Total
Tigers	3	10	14	7	34
#19 Panthers	14	7	7	7	35

=== Eastern Kentucky ===
	1	2	3	4	Total
Colonels	0	3	10	15	28
Tigers	14	21	0	0	35

=== At Vanderbilt ===
	1	2	3	4	Total
#25 Tigers	14	3	0	0	17
Commodores	7	14	7	7	35

=== At Murray State ===
	1	2	3	4	Total
#25 Tigers	3	17	0	11	31
Racers	14	3	14	7	38

=== At Austin Peay ===
	1	2	3	4	Total
Tigers	13	7	14	7	41
Governors	9	10	7	14	40

=== Tennessee Tech ===
	1	2	3	4	Total
Golden Eagles	7	20	3	14	44
Tigers	3	0	6	7	16

=== At Southeast Missouri State ===
	1	2	3	4	Total
Tigers	10	3	6	13	32
Redhawks	7	3	10	11	31

== Ranking movements ==
Ranking movements Legend: ██ Increase in ranking ██ Decrease in ranking — = Not ranked RV = Received votes
	Week													
Poll	Pre	1	2	3	4	5	6	7	8	9	10	11	12	Final
STATS FCS	RV	RV	RV	RV	RV	RV	RV	25	25	RV	RV	RV	RV	RV
Coaches	—	—	—	—	RV	RV	RV	25	RV	RV	RV	RV	RV	RV
