= Kim Dameron =

American football player and coach (born 1960)

Current position
- Title: Head coach
- Team: Southside HS (AR)
- Record: 18–30

Biographical details
- Born: November 7, 1960 (age 65)

Playing career
- 1979–1982: Arkansas
- Positions: Wide receiver, defensive back

Coaching career (HC unless noted)
- 1983: Arkansas (GA)
- 1986–1991: Missouri State (DB)
- 1992: UNLV (DB)
- 1993–1995: Murray State (DC)
- 1996–1997: Cincinnati (DB)
- 1998: Cincinnati (DC)
- 1999: Toronto Argonauts (DB)
- 2000: Eastern Illinois (DC)
- 2001–2004: Stephen F. Austin (DC)
- 2005–2007: Louisiana–Monroe (DC)
- 2008–2010: Ole Miss (S)
- 2011: Cornell (S)
- 2012: Cornell (DC)
- 2013: Louisiana Tech (DC)
- 2014–2018: Eastern Illinois
- 2019: Kansas (sr. def. analyst)
- 2020–present: Southside HS (AR)

Head coaching record
- Overall: 27–30 (college); 18–30 (high school)
- Tournaments: 0–1 (NCAA D-I playoffs)

Kim Dameron (born November 7, 1960) is an American football coach. He is the head football coach at Southside High School in Fort Smith, Arkansas, a position he has held since 2020. Dameron served as the head football coach at Eastern Illinois University from 2014 to 2018, compiling a record of 27–30.

== Head coaching record ==
=== College ===
Year	Team	Overall	Conference	Standing	Bowl/playoffs
Eastern Illinois Panthers (Ohio Valley Conference) (2014–2018)
2014	Eastern Illinois	5–7	5–3	T–3rd	
2015	Eastern Illinois	7–5	7–1	2nd	L NCAA Division I First Round
2016	Eastern Illinois	6–5	4–4	T–5th	
2017	Eastern Illinois	6–5	5–3	3rd	
2018	Eastern Illinois	3–8	3–5	T–6th	
Eastern Illinois:		27–30	24–16		
Total:		27–30			

=== High school ===
Year	Team	Overall	Conference	Standing	Bowl/playoffs
Southside Mavericks () (2020–present)
2020	Southside	2–9	1–4	7th	
2021	Southside	2–9	2–5	6th	
2022	Southside	4–7	3–4	5th	
2023	Southside	7–5	3–4	5th	
2024	Southside	3–0	0–0		
Southside:		18–30	9–17		
Total:		18–30			
