= 2016 Eastern Illinois Panthers football team =

American college football season

2016 Eastern Illinois Panthers football
- Conference: Ohio Valley Conference
- Record: 6–5 (4–4 OVC)
- Head coach: Kim Dameron (3rd season)
- Offensive coordinator: Greg Stevens (3rd season)
- Co-defensive coordinators: Michael Hodges (1st season); DeMarcus Covington (1st season)
- Home stadium: O'Brien Field

2016 Ohio Valley Conference football standings
	Conf.			Overall
Team	W		L	W		L
No. 6 Jacksonville State $^	7	–	0	10	–	2
UT Martin	6	–	2	7	–	5
Tennessee Tech	5	–	3	5	–	6
Tennessee State	4	–	3	7	–	4
Eastern Illinois	4	–	4	6	–	5
Murray State	4	–	4	4	–	7
SE Missouri State	3	–	5	3	–	8
Eastern Kentucky	2	–	6	3	–	8
Austin Peay	0	–	8	0	–	11
$ – Conference champion; ^ – FCS playoff participant; Rankings from STATS Poll

The 2016 Eastern Illinois Panthers football team represented Eastern Illinois University as a member of the Ohio Valley Conference (OVC) during the 2016 NCAA Division I FCS football season. Led by third-year head coach Kim Dameron, the Panthers compiled an overall record of 6–5 overall with a mark of 4–4 in conference play, tying for fifth place in the OVC. Eastern Illinois played home games at O'Brien Field in Charleston, Illinois.

== Schedule ==
Date	Time	Opponent	Rank	Site	TV	Result	Attendance
September 1	6:00 pm	No. 20 Western Illinois*		O'Brien Field; Charleston, IL	WEIU	L 21–38	7,618
September 10	2:30 pm	at Miami (OH)*		Yager Stadium; Oxford, OH	ESPN3	W 21–17	17,369
September 17	2:00 pm	at No. 5 Illinois State*		Hancock Stadium; Normal, IL (Mid-America Classic)	CSNCH	W 24–21	13,391
September 24	1:00 pm	Austin Peay	No. 18	O'Brien Field; Charleston, IL	WEIU	W 56–35	6,169
October 1	6:00 pm	at Southeast Missouri State	No. 13	Houck Stadium; Cape Girardeau, MO	OVCDN	L 14–21	4,892
October 8	6:00 pm	Tennessee State	No. 19	O'Brien Field; Charleston, IL	WEIU	W 35–34	4,319
October 15	6:00 pm	at Tennessee Tech	No. 18	Tucker Stadium; Cookeville, TN	OVCDN	W 30–24	4,082
October 22	1:00 pm	Murray State^{†}	No. 15	O'Brien Field; Charleston, IL	WEIU	L 38–40	7,907
October 29	2:00 pm	at No. 2 Jacksonville State	No. 23	Burgess–Snow Field at JSU Stadium; Jacksonville, AL	ESPN3	L 14–47	21,655
November 5	1:00 pm	UT Martin		O'Brien Field; Charleston, IL	WEIU	L 17–33	3,054
November 19	1:00 pm	at Eastern Kentucky		Roy Kidd Stadium; Richmond, KY	OVCDN	W 24–0	3,100
*Non-conference game; ^{†}Homecoming; Rankings from STATS Poll released prior to the game; All times are in Central time

== Roster ==
2016 Eastern Illinois Panthers football team roster
Players
Coaches
Offense

Pos.	#	Name	Class
WR	2	Tyrin Stone-Davis	GS
WR	3	Anthony Taylor	Sr
WR	4	Isaiah Nelson	Sr
RB	5	Brandon Neverdon	Sr
WR	6	Dennis Turner	Jr
QB	8	Bud Martin	So
RB	9	Devin Church	Sr
QB	11	Scotty Gilkey Jr	Fr
QB	13	Mitch Kimble	Jr
QB	14	Austin Green	Jr
QB	15	Jared Pilson	So
WR	19	Robbie Lofton	Fr
WR	20	Corey Patterson	Fr
RB	22	Korliss Marshall	Jr
RB	24	Darshon McCullough	Fr
WR	32	Javon Turner	So
RB	33	Christopher Anderson	Jr

Defense

Pos.	#	Name	Class
DB	2	Cedric Julius	Sr
DB	3	Corneliuss Page	Fr
S	4	Pono Choy	Sr
S	5	Iziah Gulley	Fr
S	6	Tray Mitchell	So
S	7	Bradley Dewberry	Jr
DE	8	Mack Weaver	Jr
DB	9	Jermiah Rainey	Sr
DB	12	DySaun Smith	So
DB	13	Xzavier Shugars	Fr
DL	16	Jeff Jones	Fr
DB	21	Mark Williams	Fr
DB	23	Tyree Stone-Davis	GS
DB	25	Hess	Fr
DB	26	Jordan Jackson	Fr
S	27	Raymond Crittenden	Fr
S	28	Vince Speller	Jr
DB	29	Elven Walker	Sr
LB	30	Nick Horne	Jr
DB	31	Malcolm Miller	Jr

Special teams

Pos.	#	Name	Class

Head coach

- Kim Dameron

Coordinators/assistant coaches

- Michael Hodges
  Assistant Coach / co-Defensive Coordinator & Linebackers

Legend

- (C) Team captain
- (S) Suspended
- (I) Ineligible
- Injured
- Redshirt

Roster

== Game summaries ==
=== Western Illinois ===
	1	2	3	4	Total
#20 Leathernecks	14	10	7	7	38
Panthers	7	0	14	0	21

=== At Miami (OH) ===
	1	2	3	4	Total
Panthers	0	7	0	14	21
RedHawks	3	7	7	0	17

=== At Illinois State ===
	1	2	3	4	Total
Panthers	3	7	7	7	24
#5 Redbirds	0	0	7	14	21

=== Austin Peay ===
	1	2	3	4	Total
Governors	0	14	7	14	35
#18 Panthers	14	7	14	21	56

=== At Southeast Missouri State ===
	1	2	3	4	Total
#13 Panthers	7	0	7	0	14
Redhawks	14	0	7	0	21

=== Tennessee State ===
	1	2	3	4	Total
Tigers	3	10	14	7	34
#19 Panthers	14	7	7	7	35

=== At Tennessee Tech ===
	1	2	3	4	Total
#18 Panthers	0	13	14	3	30
Golden Eagles	3	14	0	7	24

=== Murray State ===
	1	2	3	4	Total
Racers	3	13	6	18	40
#15 Panthers	21	0	3	14	38

=== At Jacksonville State ===
	1	2	3	4	Total
#23 Panthers	0	7	0	7	14
#2 Gamecocks	21	10	9	7	47

=== Tennessee–Martin ===
	1	2	3	4	Total
Skyhawks	6	7	3	17	33
Panthers	0	7	3	7	17

=== At Eastern Kentucky ===
	1	2	3	4	Total
Panthers	0	7	7	10	24
Colonels	0	0	0	0	0

== Ranking movements ==
Ranking movements Legend: ██ Increase in ranking ██ Decrease in ranking — = Not ranked RV = Received votes
	Week													
Poll	Pre	1	2	3	4	5	6	7	8	9	10	11	12	Final
STATS FCS	RV	RV	RV	18	13	19	18	15	23	RV	—	—	—	—
Coaches	RV	RV	RV	16	13	20	17	15	22	24	—	—	—	—
