= 2016 Tennessee Tech Golden Eagles football team =

American college football season

2016 Tennessee Tech Golden Eagles football
- Conference: Ohio Valley Conference
- Record: 5–6 (5–3 OVC)
- Head coach: Marcus Satterfield (1st season)
- Offensive coordinator: Justin Rascati (1st season)
- Defensive coordinator: Shawn Quinn (1st season)
- Home stadium: Tucker Stadium

2016 Ohio Valley Conference football standings
	Conf.			Overall
Team	W		L	W		L
No. 6 Jacksonville State $^	7	–	0	10	–	2
UT Martin	6	–	2	7	–	5
Tennessee Tech	5	–	3	5	–	6
Tennessee State	4	–	3	7	–	4
Eastern Illinois	4	–	4	6	–	5
Murray State	4	–	4	4	–	7
SE Missouri State	3	–	5	3	–	8
Eastern Kentucky	2	–	6	3	–	8
Austin Peay	0	–	8	0	–	11
$ – Conference champion; ^ – FCS playoff participant; Rankings from STATS Poll

The 2016 Tennessee Tech Golden Eagles football team represented Tennessee Technological University as a member of Ohio Valley Conference (OVC) during the 2016 NCAA Division I FCS football season. Led by first-year head coach Marcus Satterfield, the Golden Eagles compiled an overall record of 5–6 overall with a mark of 5–3 in conference play, placing third in the OVC. Tennessee Tech played home games at Tucker Stadium in Cookeville, Tennessee.

== Schedule ==
Date	Time	Opponent	Site	TV	Result	Attendance
September 1	6:00 pm	Wofford*	Tucker Stadium; Cookeville, TN	OVCDN	L 7–21	9,066
September 10	6:00 pm	at Austin Peay	Governors Stadium; Clarksville, TN (Sgt. York Trophy)	OVCDN	W 41–7	7,507
September 17	5:00 pm	at Mercer*	Moye Complex; Macon, GA	ESPN3	L 27–34	9,772
September 24	2:00 pm	at UT Martin	Graham Stadium; Martin, TN (Sgt. York Trophy)	OVCDN	L 23–44	7,316
October 1	6:00 pm	Eastern Kentucky	Tucker Stadium; Cookeville, TN	OVCDN	W 33–30 ^{OT}	7,165
October 8	1:00 pm	at No. 3 Jacksonville State	Burgess–Snow Field at JSU Stadium; Jacksonville, AL	ESPN3	L 21–40	16,092
October 15	6:00 pm	No. 18 Eastern Illinois	Tucker Stadium; Cookeville, TN	OVCDN	L 24–30	4,082
October 22	1:30 pm	Southeast Missouri State^{†}	Tucker Stadium; Cookeville, TN	OVCDN	W 21–20	9,332
November 5	3:00 pm	at Tennessee*	Neyland Stadium; Knoxville, TN	SECN	L 0–55	98,343
November 12	3:00 pm	at Tennessee State	Hale Stadium; Nashville, TN (Sgt. York Trophy)	OVCDN	W 44–16	8,981
November 19	1:30 pm	Murray State	Tucker Stadium; Cookeville, TN	OVCDN	W 55–19	4,120
*Non-conference game; ^{†}Homecoming; Rankings from STATS Poll released prior to the game; All times are in Central time

== Game summaries ==
=== Wofford ===
	1	2	3	4	Total
Terriers	0	7	7	7	21
Golden Eagles	7	0	0	0	7

=== At Austin Peay ===
	1	2	3	4	Total
Golden Eagles	14	14	7	6	41
Governors	0	0	7	0	7

=== At Mercer ===
	1	2	3	4	Total
Golden Eagles	7	7	13	0	27
Bears	3	7	14	10	34

=== At UT Martin ===
	1	2	3	4	Total
Golden Eagles	6	3	0	14	23
Skyhawks	7	14	7	16	44

=== Eastern Kentucky ===
	1	2	3	4	OT	Total
Colonels	6	7	7	7	3	30
Golden Eagles	7	10	3	7	6	33

=== At Jacksonville State ===
	1	2	3	4	Total
Golden Eagles	0	7	7	7	21
#3 Gamecocks	17	16	7	0	40

=== Eastern Illinois ===
	1	2	3	4	Total
#18 Panthers	0	13	14	3	30
Golden Eagles	3	14	0	7	24

=== Southeast Missouri State ===
	1	2	3	4	Total
Redhawks	10	7	3	0	20
Golden Eagles	0	21	0	0	21

=== At Tennessee ===
	1	2	3	4	Total
Golden Eagles	0	0	0	0	0
Volunteers	21	17	7	10	55

=== At Tennessee State ===
	1	2	3	4	Total
Golden Eagles	7	20	3	14	44
Tigers	3	0	6	7	16

=== Murray State ===
	1	2	3	4	Total
Racers	0	6	0	13	19
Golden Eagles	13	21	7	14	55
