= 2016 Southeast Missouri State Redhawks football team =

American college football season

2016 Southeast Missouri State Redhawks football
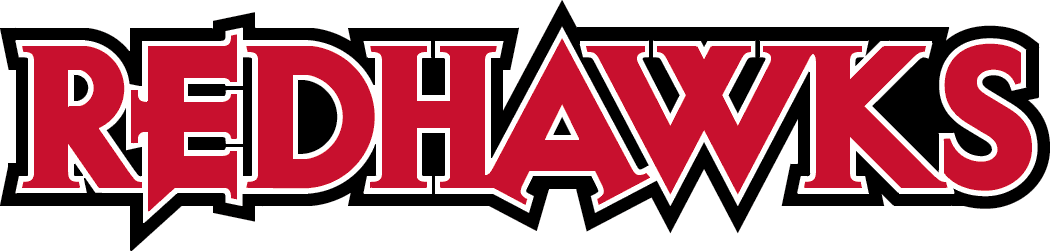
- Conference: Ohio Valley Conference
- Record: 3–8 (3–5 OVC)
- Head coach: Tom Matukewicz (3rd season)
- Offensive coordinator: Jon Wiemers (1st season)
- Defensive coordinator: Bryce Saia (3rd season)
- Home stadium: Houck Stadium

2016 Ohio Valley Conference football standings
	Conf.			Overall
Team	W		L	W		L
No. 6 Jacksonville State $^	7	–	0	10	–	2
UT Martin	6	–	2	7	–	5
Tennessee Tech	5	–	3	5	–	6
Tennessee State	4	–	3	7	–	4
Eastern Illinois	4	–	4	6	–	5
Murray State	4	–	4	4	–	7
SE Missouri State	3	–	5	3	–	8
Eastern Kentucky	2	–	6	3	–	8
Austin Peay	0	–	8	0	–	11
$ – Conference champion; ^ – FCS playoff participant; Rankings from STATS Poll

The 2016 Southeast Missouri State Redhawks football team represented Southeast Missouri State University as a member of the Ohio Valley Conference (OVC) during the 2016 NCAA Division I FCS football season. Led by third-year head coach Tom Matukewicz, the Redhawks compiled an overall record of 3–8 with a mark of 3–5 in conference play, placing seventh in the OVC. Southeast Missouri State played home games at Houck Stadium in Cape Girardeau, Missouri.

== Schedule ==
Date	Time	Opponent	Site	TV	Result	Attendance
September 3	6:00 pm	at Memphis*	Liberty Bowl Memorial Stadium; Memphis, TN	ESPN3	L 17–35	42,876
September 10	6:00 pm	at Southern Illinois*	Saluki Stadium; Carbondale, IL		L 22–30	10,003
September 17	6:00 pm	Indiana State*	Houck Stadium; Cape Girardeau, MO	OVCDN	L 24–27	7,637
September 24	6:00 pm	at Murray State	Roy Stewart Stadium; Murray, KY	ESPN3	W 17–16	10,014
October 1	6:00 pm	No. 13 Eastern Illinois	Houck Stadium; Cape Girardeau, MO	OVCDN	W 21–14	4,892
October 8	5:00 pm	at Eastern Kentucky	Roy Kidd Stadium; Richmond, KY	OVCDN	L 16–31	10,001
October 22	1:30 pm	at Tennessee Tech	Tucker Stadium; Cookeville, TN	OVCDN	L 20–21	9,332
October 29	1:00 pm	Austin Peay	Houck Stadium; Cape Girardeau, MO	OVCDN	W 41–21	4,328
November 5	1:00 pm	No. 2 Jacksonville State^{†}	Houck Stadium; Cape Girardeau, MO	ESPN3	L 10–17	6,839
November 12	2:00 pm	at UT Martin	Graham Stadium; Martin, TN	OVCDN	L 10–24	3,146
November 19	1:00 pm	Tennessee State	Houck Stadium; Cape Girardeau, MO	OVCDN	L 31–32	3,117
*Non-conference game; ^{†}Homecoming; Rankings from STATS Poll released prior to the game; All times are in Central time

== Game summaries ==
=== At Memphis ===
	1	2	3	4	Total
Redhawks	0	3	7	7	17
Tigers	22	7	3	3	35

=== At Southern Illinois ===
	1	2	3	4	Total
Redhawks	6	3	0	13	22
Salukis	3	7	17	3	30

=== Indiana State ===
	1	2	3	4	Total
Sycamores	7	3	3	14	27
Redhawks	7	3	7	7	24

=== At Murray State ===
	1	2	3	4	Total
Redhawks	7	3	0	7	17
Racers	7	0	6	3	16

=== Eastern Illinois ===
	1	2	3	4	Total
#13 Panthers	7	0	7	0	14
Redhawks	14	0	7	0	21

=== At Eastern Kentucky ===
	1	2	3	4	Total
Redhawks	3	3	3	7	16
Colonels	0	14	10	7	31

=== At Tennessee Tech ===
	1	2	3	4	Total
Redhawks	10	7	3	0	20
Golden Eagles	0	21	0	0	21

=== Austin Peay ===
	1	2	3	4	Total
Governors	0	0	14	7	21
Redhawks	10	7	21	3	41

=== Jacksonville State ===
	1	2	3	4	Total
#2 Gamecocks	7	10	0	0	17
Redhawks	0	0	7	3	10

=== At Tennessee–Martin ===
	1	2	3	4	Total
Redhawks	0	7	0	3	10
Skyhawks	3	7	7	7	24

=== Tennessee State ===
	1	2	3	4	Total
Tigers	10	3	6	13	32
Redhawks	7	3	10	11	31
