= Maty Mauk =

American football player (born 1993)

Profile
- Position: Quarterback

Personal information
- Born: June 13, 1993 (age 33); Kenton, Ohio, U.S.
- Listed height: 6 ft 0 in (1.83 m)
- Listed weight: 200 lb (91 kg)

Career information
- High school: Kenton
- College: Missouri (2012–2015); Eastern Kentucky (2016)
- NFL draft: 2017: undrafted

Career history
- Saskatchewan Roughriders (2017)*
- * Offseason or practice squad member only

Mathew "Maty" Richard Mauk (born June 13, 1993) is an American former football quarterback. He is currently the head football coach at Principia School, located in Town and Country, West St. Louis County. He played college football for the Missouri Tigers and Eastern Kentucky Colonels. He is the younger brother of quarterback Ben Mauk.

== Early life ==
Mauk, the son of Mike and Gwyn Mauk, was born and raised in Kenton, Ohio. Mauk attended Kenton High School where he was coached by his father. As a senior, Mauk led Kenton to the state championship game where he lost to the Norwayne High School Bobcats of Creston, Ohio. He was named Ohio's Mr. Football and was named an All-American by Sports Illustrated and Parade Magazine.

Mauk holds national high school career records for passing completions (1,353), passing attempts (2,110), passing yards (18,932), and total yards (22,681). Mauk held the passing touchdowns record with 219 but was surpassed by Jake Browning in 2014 (229). The records for completions, attempts, passing yards, and total yards were previously held by his older brother, Ben Mauk, who was a college football standout for the Cincinnati Bearcats. In addition to football, Maty Mauk was a high school All-District selection in basketball and qualified for the Ohio state track meet in four different events.

== College career ==
In addition to Missouri, Mauk received scholarship offers from Cincinnati, Illinois, Michigan, Notre Dame, and Vanderbilt, among others.

College recruiting
Name	Hometown	School	Height	Weight	Commit date
Maty Mauk; QB	Kenton, OH	Kenton	6 ft 2 in (1.88 m)	190 lb (86 kg)	Jul 7, 2011
Maty Mauk; QB	Recruit ratings: Scout: Rivals: (80)				

=== 2012 season ===
Mauk was redshirted during his first season at the University of Missouri and did not play in any games.

=== 2013 season ===
Throughout the offseason, Mauk competed for the Tigers' starting quarterback job but was ultimately named the backup to returning starter James Franklin.

Mauk played sparingly to begin the 2013 season until Franklin left the Tigers' game against Georgia with a shoulder injury. Mauk entered the game with Missouri leading 28–26 in the fourth quarter and ultimately helped lead them to a 41–26 victory.

Mauk made his first career start in place of the injured Franklin the following week against Florida, leading the Tigers to a 36–17 victory and earning Southeastern Conference Freshman Player of the Week honors. He earned the honor again on November 4 after leading Mizzou to a 31–3 win over Tennessee. Mauk passed for three touchdowns and ran for another in the Tigers' victory.

=== 2014 season ===
Mauk and the Tigers passing game came into 2014 with considerable hype, despite the loss of the previous year's three leading receivers. And through three games, that hype seemed to be coming to fruition, but problems arose in a close win over South Carolina and came to a climax a week later in an abysmal shutout at the hands of Georgia where Mauk completed just 9 of 21 pass attempts for 97 yards and four interceptions. Following the Georgia game Mauk and the Tigers rebounded and finished 11–3 winning the SEC East for the second consecutive year along with the Citrus Bowl against Minnesota.

=== 2015 season ===
On September 29, 2015, Missouri announced that Mauk was suspended for a violation of team policies. A 2019 interview with the St. Louis Post-Dispatch revealed that the suspension was due to a failed drug test for marijuana use. After missing four games, Mauk was reinstated on October 25 and rejoined team activities during the bye week. On November 1, 2015, Missouri announced that Mauk was suspended for a second time, for the remainder of the 2015 season, due to disciplinary reasons. According to multiple sources cited by the St. Louis Post-Dispatch, Mauk's second suspension followed a verbal confrontation that took place late at night outside of a downtown Columbia bar. As a result of Mauk's suspensions, freshman Drew Lock took over as starting quarterback of the Tigers for the final eight games of the 2015 season. Soon after the season concluded, on January 26, 2016, Mauk was indefinitely suspended from the Missouri football team after an old video surfaced of him apparently snorting a white substance; he was dismissed from the program on January 28, 2016. Mauk then transferred to Eastern Kentucky University for the 2016 season.

=== College statistics ===
Year	Team	Games			Passing								Rushing			
Year	Team	GP	GS	Record	Cmp	Att	Pct	Yds	Avg	TD	Int	Rtg	Att	Yds	Avg	TD
2012	Missouri	Redshirt (redshirt)														
2013	Missouri	13	4	3–1	68	133	51.1	1,071	8.1	11	2	143.1	41	229	5.6	1
2014	Missouri	14	14	11–3	221	414	53.4	2,648	6.4	25	13	120.8	108	373	3.5	2
2015	Missouri	4	4	3–1	57	110	53.4	654	5.9	6	4	112.5	36	145	4.0	1
2016	Eastern Kentucky	2	2	0–2	21	39	53.8	303	7.8	1	2	117.3	19	19	1.0	0
Career		33	24	17–7	367	696	52.7	4,676	6.7	43	21	123.5	204	766	3.8	4

== Professional career ==
In 2017, Mauk signed with the Saskatchewan Roughriders to compete for the starting spot with former NFL quarterback Vince Young. He was cut from the team after two days of practice due to a shoulder injury.

Mauk coached on the sidelines of a Glendale High School football game, where his father is head coach and his brother Ben Mauk is an assistant, in August and was credited with assisting the school's quarterback in throwing 8 touchdowns in the game. Head coach Mike Mauk stated that Maty would be joining the coaching staff as an assistant. In addition to serving as an assistant coach under his father at Glendale High, Maty Mauk also works as a real estate agent and opened a training center for young athletes.
