= 2016 Eastern Kentucky Colonels football team =

American college football season

2016 Eastern Kentucky Colonels football
- Conference: Ohio Valley Conference
- Record: 3–8 (2–6 OVC)
- Head coach: Mark Elder (1st season)
- Offensive coordinator: Kurt Mattix (1st season)
- Defensive coordinator: Angelo Mirando (1st season)
- Home stadium: Roy Kidd Stadium

2016 Ohio Valley Conference football standings
	Conf.			Overall
Team	W		L	W		L
No. 6 Jacksonville State $^	7	–	0	10	–	2
UT Martin	6	–	2	7	–	5
Tennessee Tech	5	–	3	5	–	6
Tennessee State	4	–	3	7	–	4
Eastern Illinois	4	–	4	6	–	5
Murray State	4	–	4	4	–	7
SE Missouri State	3	–	5	3	–	8
Eastern Kentucky	2	–	6	3	–	8
Austin Peay	0	–	8	0	–	11
$ – Conference champion; ^ – FCS playoff participant; Rankings from STATS Poll

The 2016 Eastern Kentucky Colonels football team represented Eastern Kentucky University during the 2016 NCAA Division I FCS football season. They were led by first-year head coach Mark Elder and played their home games at Roy Kidd Stadium. They were a member of the Ohio Valley Conference. They finished the season 3–8, 2–6 in OVC play to finish in eighth place.

== Schedule ==
Date	Time	Opponent	Site	TV	Result	Attendance
September 3	12:00 pm	at Purdue*	Ross–Ade Stadium; West Lafayette, IN	ESPNews	L 24–45	32,074
September 8	7:00 pm	Pikeville*	Roy Kidd Stadium; Richmond, KY	OVCDN	W 55–14	11,400
September 17	3:00 pm	at Ball State*	Scheumann Stadium; Muncie, IN	ESPN3	L 14–41	10,902
October 1	7:00 pm	at Tennessee Tech	Tucker Stadium; Cookeville, TN	OVCDN	L 30–33 ^{OT}	7,165
October 8	6:00 pm	Southeast Missouri State	Roy Kidd Stadium; Richmond, KY	OVCDN	W 31–16	10,001
October 15	7:00 pm	at Tennessee State	Nissan Stadium; Nashville, TN	ESPN3	L 28–35	21,053
October 22	3:00 pm	No. 2 Jacksonville State^{†}	Roy Kidd Stadium; Richmond, KY	OVCDN	L 7–24	11,600
October 29	3:00 pm	at Tennessee–Martin	Graham Stadium; Martin, TN	OVCDN	L 3–33	3,025
November 5	1:00 pm	Murray State	Roy Kidd Stadium; Richmond, KY	OVCDN	L 28–41	4,200
November 12	5:00 pm	at Austin Peay	Governors Stadium; Clarksville, TN	OVCDN	W 67–30	5,816
November 19	1:00 pm	Eastern Illinois	Roy Kidd Stadium; Richmond, KY	OVCDN	L 0–24	3,100
*Non-conference game; ^{†}Homecoming; Rankings from STATS Poll released prior to the game; All times are in Eastern time

== Game summaries ==
=== At Purdue ===
	1	2	3	4	Total
Colonels	8	10	0	6	24
Boilermakers	21	7	0	17	45

=== Pikeville ===
	1	2	3	4	Total
Bears	0	14	0	0	14
Colonels	7	17	24	7	55

=== At Ball State ===
	1	2	3	4	Total
Colonels	0	0	0	14	14
Cardinals	14	13	7	7	41

=== At Tennessee Tech ===
	1	2	3	4	OT	Total
Colonels	6	7	7	7	3	30
Golden Eagles	7	10	3	7	6	33

=== Southeast Missouri State ===
	1	2	3	4	Total
Redhawks	3	3	3	7	16
Colonels	0	14	10	7	31

=== At Tennessee State ===
	1	2	3	4	Total
Colonels	0	3	10	15	28
Tigers	14	21	0	0	35

=== Jacksonville State ===
	1	2	3	4	Total
#2 Gamecocks	0	14	3	7	24
Colonels	0	0	7	0	7

=== At Tennessee–Martin ===
	1	2	3	4	Total
Colonels	3	0	0	0	3
Skyhawks	7	14	6	6	33

=== Murray State ===
	1	2	3	4	Total
Racers	0	7	21	13	41
Colonels	8	10	2	8	28

=== At Austin Peay ===
	1	2	3	4	Total
Colonels	11	28	7	21	67
Governors	0	14	13	3	30

=== Eastern Illinois ===
	1	2	3	4	Total
Panthers	0	7	7	10	24
Colonels	0	0	0	0	0

== Roster ==
2016 Eastern Kentucky Colonels football team roster
Players
Coaches
Offense

Pos.	#	Name	Class
RB	2	Jared Sanders	Sr
QB	4	Bennie Coney	Sr
RB	5	Isaiah Murph	Fr
RB	6	Henry Enyenihi	Sr
QB	7	Tim Boyle	Sr
QB	7	Maty Mauk	Sr
WR	8	Bryan Green	Sr
WR	9	Ryan Markush	Jr
WR	11	Neiko Creamer	So
QB	14	Tyler Swafford	So
QB	15	Austin Scott	Fr
QB	16	James Smith	Fr
WR	17	Jacky Marcellus	Jr
TE	18	Dan Crimmins	Sr
RB	20	Ethan Thomas	So
RB	22	Kentayvus Hopkins	Jr
RB	23	Daryl McCleskey	Fr
RB	30	Ralph Patton	So
WR	33	Arien Beasley	So
RB	37	Raynaldy Gustave	So
RB	39	Bo Brooks	Sr
TE	43	Dan Paul	So
OL	60	Lucas Williams	Fr
OL	61	Landon Rasnick	Sr
OL	62	Ryan Garretson	Sr
WR	63	Stephen Jones	Fr
OL	64	Cammeron Kowalewski	So
OL	65	Z Stephenson	So
OL	66	Chance Edwards	Jr
OL	67	Nick Cavinee	Fr
WR	68	Antwaun Walker	Fr
OL	69	Deondre Tate	Fr
OL	71	Jackson Bardall	Fr
OL, LS	72	Justin Rawlins	So
OL	75	De'jour Simpson	Fr
OL	77	Nathan Murray	Fr
OL	78	Justin Myles	So
OL	79	Justin Adekoya	Sr
WR	80	Bryson Williams	Jr
WR	81	Aaron Riddick	Fr
WR	82	Alex Cabrera	Fr
WR	83	Billy Reid	Sr
WR	84	Cameron Fogle	Jr
TE	85	Jon Floyd	Sr
TE	86	Tyler Malone	Jr
WR	87	Matt Clark	Fr
WR	88	Devin Borders	Sr
TE	89	Clayton Schmerber	So
WR		Nathan Brown	Fr
WR		Scott Daniel	Jr
WR		Derius Jones	Jr

Defense

Pos.	#	Name	Class
DB	1	Nigel Bethel	Jr
LB	3	Thomas Owens	Sr
LB	5	Dwight Williams	So
DB	10	Jordan Whitfield	Jr
DB	12	Cornelius Floyd	Jr
DB	13	Kiante Northington	Sr
CB	21	Logan Oce	Jr
DB	24	Jared Tucker	So
DB	25	Tre' Moore	So
DB	26	Jamarcus Whitmore	Fr
DB	27	Khylil Miller	Fr
DB	29	Ben Bascom	Fr
DB	31	A. J. Jackson	Fr
CB	32	Buck Solomon	Jr
LB	34	Demontre Boyd	So
DB	35	T. J. Comstock	Fr
DB	36	Omari Alexander	Fr
RB	39	Kobie Grace	Sr
DL	40	Patrick Graffree	Sr
DB	41	Eric Reed	Jr
CB	42	Rhyan Baker	Fr
DL	44	Aaron Patrick	So
LB	45	Corey Glass	So
LB	48	Kamaree' Walden	So
LB	49	Damon Lowe	Fr
LB	50	Devante Colton	Fr
LB	51	Quinton Locklear	Fr
LB	52	Caperton Humphrey	Fr
LB	53	Jeffrey Canady	Jr
DE	55	Taquan Evans	Fr
DL	56	LaJuan Smith	Sr
DL	70	Connor Foos	Fr
DL	90	Josiah Bennett	Jr
DL	91	Sheldon Fleming	Jr
DL	92	Dillon Denault	Fr
DL	95	Kagen Skidmore	Jr
DE	96	Xavier Garcia	Sr
DL	97	Avery Pitt	Sr
DL	98	Luder Jean Louis	Jr
DL	99	Jeremy Hodowanic	Fr
LB		Brentton Ervin	So
DB		Nate Hatcher	So

Special teams

Pos.	#	Name	Class
K	9	Brandon Peege	Fr
P	19	Keith Krzuszczak	Jr
K, P	28	Samuel Hayworth	Fr
LS	46	Ben Hoffman	Fr
K	47	Dylan Hornsby	Fr
LS	58	Matt Howard	Jr
K	76	Lucas Williams	Jr
WR	93	Zack Burgy-VanHoose	Sr

Head coach

- Mark Elder

Coordinators/assistant coaches

- Terry Heffernan (assistant head coach/offensive line)
- Kurt Mattix (defensive coordinator)
- Angelo Mirando (offensive coordinator)
- Shannon Morrison (co-defensive coordinator/defensive backs)
- Chase Gibson (linebackers)
- Kevin Koger (wide receivers)
- Greg Meyer (special teams/running backs)
- Walter Stewart (defensive line)
- Tommy Zagorski (tight ends/offensive tackles)
- Patrick Parrilli (offensive quality control)
- Eric Norris (offensive quality control)
- Robert Belle (defensive quality control)
- Billy High (defensive quality control)
- Spencer Patterson (special teams quality control)

Legend

- (C) Team captain
- (S) Suspended
- (I) Ineligible
- Injured
- Redshirt

Roster
Last update: October 28, 2016
