= Ross Els =

American football player and coach (born 1965)

Biographical details
- Born: August 14, 1965 (age 61)

Playing career
- 1984–1987: Nebraska–Omaha
- Position: Safety

Coaching career (HC unless noted)
- 1989: Northern Iowa (GA)
- 1990–1993: Nebraska–Omaha (DB)
- 1994: Northern Iowa (DB)
- 1995: Hastings (QB)
- 1996: Hastings (DC/DB)
- 1997–2000: Hastings
- 2001–2002: New Mexico State (STC/S)
- 2003–2004: New Mexico State (DC/LB)
- 2005–2010: Ohio (LB)
- 2011: Nebraska (LB)
- 2012–2014: Nebraska (LB/STC/RC)
- 2015: Lincoln Southwest HS (NE) (assistant)
- 2016: Purdue (DC/S)
- 2017–2018: Colorado (ILB)
- 2019: Colorado (STC/ILB)
- 2020–2023: Michigan State (STC/LB)

Head coaching record
- Overall: 32–9
- Tournaments: 1–2 (NAIA playoffs)

Accomplishments and honors

Championships
- 1 NIAC (1998)

Ross Els (born August 14, 1965) is an American football coach who was the special teams and linebackers coach for the Michigan State football team He previously was the defensive coordinator for the Purdue Boilermakers football team and the linebackers coach for the Nebraska Cornhuskers. Els served as the head football coach at Hastings College in Hastings, Nebraska from 1997 to 2000, compiling a record of 32–9.

== Head coaching record ==
| Year | Team | Overall | Conference | Standing | Bowl/playoffs | NAIA^{#} |
|---|---|---|---|---|---|---|
Hastings Broncos (Nebraska-Iowa / Great Plains Athletic Conference) (1997–2000)
| 1997 | Hastings | 5–4 | 5–1 | 2nd | | |
| 1998 | Hastings | 10–1 | 6–0 | 1st | L NAIA First Round | |
| 1999 | Hastings | 11–1 | 6–0 | 1st | L NAIA Second Round | 3 |
| 2000 | Hastings | 6–3 | 5–3 | T–3rd | | |
| Hastings: | | 32–9 | 22–4 | | | |
| Total: | | 32–9 | | | | |
National championship Conference title Conference division title or championship game berth
