= McCarron =

McCarron is a surname. Notable people with the surname include:

- Eve McCarron from scrogg road played badminton for Northern Ireland
- A. J. McCarron (born 1990), American football quarterback
- Bob McCarron (born 1950), Australian medic and special effects prosthetic makeup artist
- Cathal McCarron (born 1987), All Ireland Winning Gaelic footballer for Tyrone
- Cathleen McCarron, Scottish film, television, theatre and audiobook actor and professional voice coach
- Charles McCarron (1891–1919), United States Tin Pan Alley composer & lyricist
- Chloe McCarron (born 1997), Northern Irish professional footballer
- Chris McCarron (born 1955), American thoroughbred horse racing Hall of Fame retired jockey
- Douglas J. McCarron (born 1950), labor union activist and president of the United Brotherhood of Carpenters and Joiners of America
- James McCarron (1851–1918), Irish trade unionist
- Joe McCarron, former radio DJ and electoral candidate from Dungloe
- Karen McCarron (born 1968), Illinois physician who admitted to smothering her autistic daughter Katherine 'Katie' McCarron to death
- Leon McCarron (born 1986), Northern Irish adventurer, filmmaker and author
- Liam McCarron (born 2001), professional footballer
- Lon McCarron or Lon McEachern (born 1956), American sports commentator
- Michael McCarron (born 1995), American professional ice hockey player
- Mike McCarron (1922–1991), American professional basketball player
- Mitch McCarron (born 1992), Australian professional basketball player
- Owen McCarron (1929–2005), Canadian cartoonist and publisher
- Paul McCarron (1934–2013), American politician
- Riley McCarron (born 1993), former American football wide receiver
- Sarah McCarron, American actor and writer currently living and working in Los Angeles
- Scott McCarron (born 1965), American professional golfer
- Hannah McCarron (born 1996), member of Hanrac
- Rachael McCarron (born 1996), member of Hanrac

== See also ==
- 21698 McCarron (1999 RD56), a Main-belt Asteroid discovered in 1999
- McCarrons Lake, a lake in Minnesota
- Andrew McCarron Three-Decker, historic triple decker house at 3 Pitt Street in Worcester, Massachusetts
- McCarron Internal Security Act
- McCarron-Ferguson Act
- McCarron, Michigan, an unincorporated community
- Macaron
- Maccarone (disambiguation)
- McCarren
