= 2016 Iowa Hawkeyes football team =

American college football season

2016 Iowa Hawkeyes football

Outback Bowl, L 3–30 vs. Florida
- Conference: Big Ten Conference
- West Division
- Record: 8–5 (6–3 Big Ten)
- Head coach: Kirk Ferentz (18th season)
- Offensive coordinator: Greg Davis (5th season)
- Offensive scheme: Multiple
- Defensive coordinator: Phil Parker (5th season)
- Base defense: 4–3
- Home stadium: Kinnick Stadium

2016 Big Ten Conference football standings
	Conf.			Overall
Team	W		L	W		L
East Division
No. 7 Penn State xy$	8	–	1	11	–	3
No. 6 Ohio State x^	8	–	1	11	–	2
No. 10 Michigan	7	–	2	10	–	3
Indiana	4	–	5	6	–	7
Maryland	3	–	6	6	–	7
Michigan State	1	–	8	3	–	9
Rutgers	0	–	9	2	–	10
West Division
No. 9 Wisconsin xy	7	–	2	11	–	3
Iowa	6	–	3	8	–	5
Nebraska	6	–	3	9	–	4
Minnesota	5	–	4	9	–	4
Northwestern	5	–	4	7	–	6
Illinois	2	–	7	3	–	9
Purdue	1	–	8	3	–	9
Championship: Penn State 38, Wisconsin 31
^ – College Football Playoff participant; $ – Conference champion; x – Division champion/co-champions; y – Championship game participant; Rankings from AP Poll

The 2016 Iowa Hawkeyes football team represented the University of Iowa in the 2016 NCAA Division I FBS football season. The Hawkeyes, led by 18th-year head coach Kirk Ferentz, were members of the West Division of the Big Ten Conference and played their home games at Kinnick Stadium in Iowa City, Iowa.

== 2016 commitments ==
College recruiting information
Name	Hometown	School	Height	Weight	40^{‡}	Commit date
Toks Akinribade; RB	Brownsburg, IN	Brownsburg High School	6 ft 0 in (1.83 m)	205 lb (93 kg)	4.50	Jun 18, 2015
Toks Akinribade; RB	Recruit ratings: Scout: Rivals: 247Sports: ESPN:					
Cole Banwart; G	Algona, IA	Algona High School	6 ft 4 in (1.93 m)	279 lb (127 kg)	NA	Jun 19, 2015
Cole Banwart; G	Recruit ratings: Scout: Rivals: 247Sports: ESPN:					
Shaun Beyer; TE	Cedar Rapids, IA	Kennedy High School	6 ft 5 in (1.96 m)	204 lb (93 kg)	4.97	Nov 25, 2015
Shaun Beyer; TE	Recruit ratings: Scout: Rivals: 247Sports: ESPN:					
Lance Billings; CB	Lorain, OH	Clearview High School	5 ft 11 in (1.80 m)	165 lb (75 kg)	NA	Jun 29, 2015
Lance Billings; CB	Recruit ratings: Scout: Rivals: 247Sports: ESPN:					
Cedric Boswell; CB	Beverly Hills, MI	Groves High School	5 ft 11 in (1.80 m)	174 lb (79 kg)	4.34	Jun 29, 2015
Cedric Boswell; CB	Recruit ratings: Scout: Rivals: 247Sports: ESPN:					
Noah Clayberg; S	Pella, IA	Pella High School	5 ft 11 in (1.80 m)	195 lb (88 kg)	NA	Jan 24, 2016
Noah Clayberg; S	Recruit ratings: Scout: Rivals: 247Sports: ESPN:					
Noah Fant; TE	Omaha, NE	Omaha South High School	6 ft 5 in (1.96 m)	215 lb (98 kg)	4.64	Aug 28, 2015
Noah Fant; TE	Recruit ratings: Scout: Rivals: 247Sports: ESPN:					
Chauncey Golston; DE	Detroit, MI	East English Village Prep Academy	6 ft 5 in (1.96 m)	235 lb (107 kg)	4.72	May 18, 2015
Chauncey Golston; DE	Recruit ratings: Scout: Rivals: 247Sports: ESPN:					
T. J. Hockenson; TE	Chariton, IA	Chariton High School	6 ft 5 in (1.96 m)	225 lb (102 kg)	4.80	Jun 20, 2015
T. J. Hockenson; TE	Recruit ratings: Scout: Rivals: 247Sports: ESPN:					
Amani Hooker; S	Brooklyn Center, MN	Park Center Senior High School	6 ft 1 in (1.85 m)	195 lb (88 kg)	4.68	Jun 16, 2015
Amani Hooker; S	Recruit ratings: Scout: Rivals: 247Sports: ESPN:					
Alaric Jackson; OT	Detroit, MI	Renaissance High School	6 ft 6 in (1.98 m)	285 lb (129 kg)	5.56	Feb 3, 2016
Alaric Jackson; OT	Recruit ratings: Scout: Rivals: 247Sports: ESPN:					
Amani Jones; ILB	Chicago, IL	Wendell Phillips Academy High School	5 ft 11 in (1.80 m)	210 lb (95 kg)	4.70	Jun 21, 2015
Amani Jones; ILB	Recruit ratings: Scout: Rivals: 247Sports: ESPN:					
Cedrick Lattimore; DE	Detroit, MI	East English Village Prep Academy	6 ft 5 in (1.96 m)	265 lb (120 kg)	5.12	May 18, 2015
Cedrick Lattimore; DE	Recruit ratings: Scout: Rivals: 247Sports: ESPN:					
Romeo McKnight; DE	Crystal Lake, IL	Crystal Lake Central High School	6 ft 5 in (1.96 m)	230 lb (100 kg)	5.13	Jun 29, 2015
Romeo McKnight; DE	Recruit ratings: Scout: Rivals: 247Sports: ESPN:					
Nick Niemann; OLB	Sycamore, IL	Sycamore High School	6 ft 3 in (1.91 m)	210 lb (95 kg)	NA	Jun 20, 2015
Nick Niemann; OLB	Recruit ratings: Scout: Rivals: 247Sports: ESPN:					
Emmanuel Rugamba; WR	Naperville, IL	Naperville Central High School	6 ft 1 in (1.85 m)	175 lb (79 kg)	4.65	Aug 1, 2015
Emmanuel Rugamba; WR	Recruit ratings: Scout: Rivals: 247Sports: ESPN:					
Austin Schulte; DE	Pella, IA	Pella High School	6 ft 4 in (1.93 m)	240 lb (110 kg)	NA	Jun 21, 2015
Austin Schulte; DE	Recruit ratings: Scout: Rivals: 247Sports: ESPN:					
Brandon Simon; DE	Ramsey, NJ	Don Bosco Prep High School	6 ft 1 in (1.85 m)	235 lb (107 kg)	4.79	Jun 26, 2015
Brandon Simon; DE	Recruit ratings: Scout: Rivals: 247Sports: ESPN:					
Nate Stanley; QB	Menominee, WI	Menominee High School	6 ft 4 in (1.93 m)	200 lb (91 kg)	4.79	Nov 14, 2014
Nate Stanley; QB	Recruit ratings: Scout: Rivals: 247Sports: ESPN:					
Kyle Taylor; ILB	Washington, DC	Gonzaga College High School	6 ft 1 in (1.85 m)	225 lb (102 kg)	4.75	Jun 10, 2015
Kyle Taylor; ILB	Recruit ratings: Scout: Rivals: 247Sports: ESPN:					
Barrington Wade; RB	Skokie, IL	Niles North High School	6 ft 1 in (1.85 m)	205 lb (93 kg)	4.67	Jun 15, 2015
Barrington Wade; RB	Recruit ratings: Scout: Rivals: 247Sports: ESPN:					
Kristian Welch; ILB	Iola, WI	Iola-Scandinavia High School	6 ft 4 in (1.93 m)	218 lb (99 kg)	NA	Jul 14, 2015
Kristian Welch; ILB	Recruit ratings: Scout: Rivals: 247Sports: ESPN:					
Spencer Williams; G	Cedar Falls, IA	Cedar Falls High School	6 ft 3 in (1.91 m)	280 lb (130 kg)	5.30	Jun 18, 2015
Spencer Williams; G	Recruit ratings: Scout: Rivals: 247Sports: ESPN:					
Toren Young; RB	Monona, WI	Monona Grove High School	5 ft 11 in (1.80 m)	205 lb (93 kg)	4.71	Jan 26, 2015
Toren Young; RB	Recruit ratings: Scout: Rivals: 247Sports: ESPN:					
Devonte Young; WR	Waldorf, MD	North Point High School	6 ft 1 in (1.85 m)	195 lb (88 kg)	4.51	Jun 22, 2015
Devonte Young; WR	Recruit ratings: Scout: Rivals: 247Sports: ESPN:					
Overall recruit ranking: Scout: 38 Rivals: 42 247Sports: 49 ESPN: 49
Note: In many cases, Scout, Rivals, 247Sports, On3, and ESPN may conflict in their listings of height and weight.; In these cases, the average was taken. ESPN grades are on a 100-point scale.; Sources: "ESPN- College Football Recruiting Schools". ESPN.; "2016 Team Ranking". Rivals.com.

== Schedule ==
Iowa announced its 2016 football schedule on July 11, 2013. The 2016 schedule consisted of 7 home and 5 away games in the regular season. The Hawkeyes hosted Big Ten foes Michigan, Nebraska, Northwestern, and Wisconsin, and traveled to Illinois, Minnesota, Penn State, Purdue, and Rutgers.

The team hosted all three of their non–conference games which were against the Iowa State Cyclones from the Big 12 Conference, Miami RedHawks from the Mid-American Conference (MAC), and the North Dakota State Bison from the Missouri Valley Football Conference.

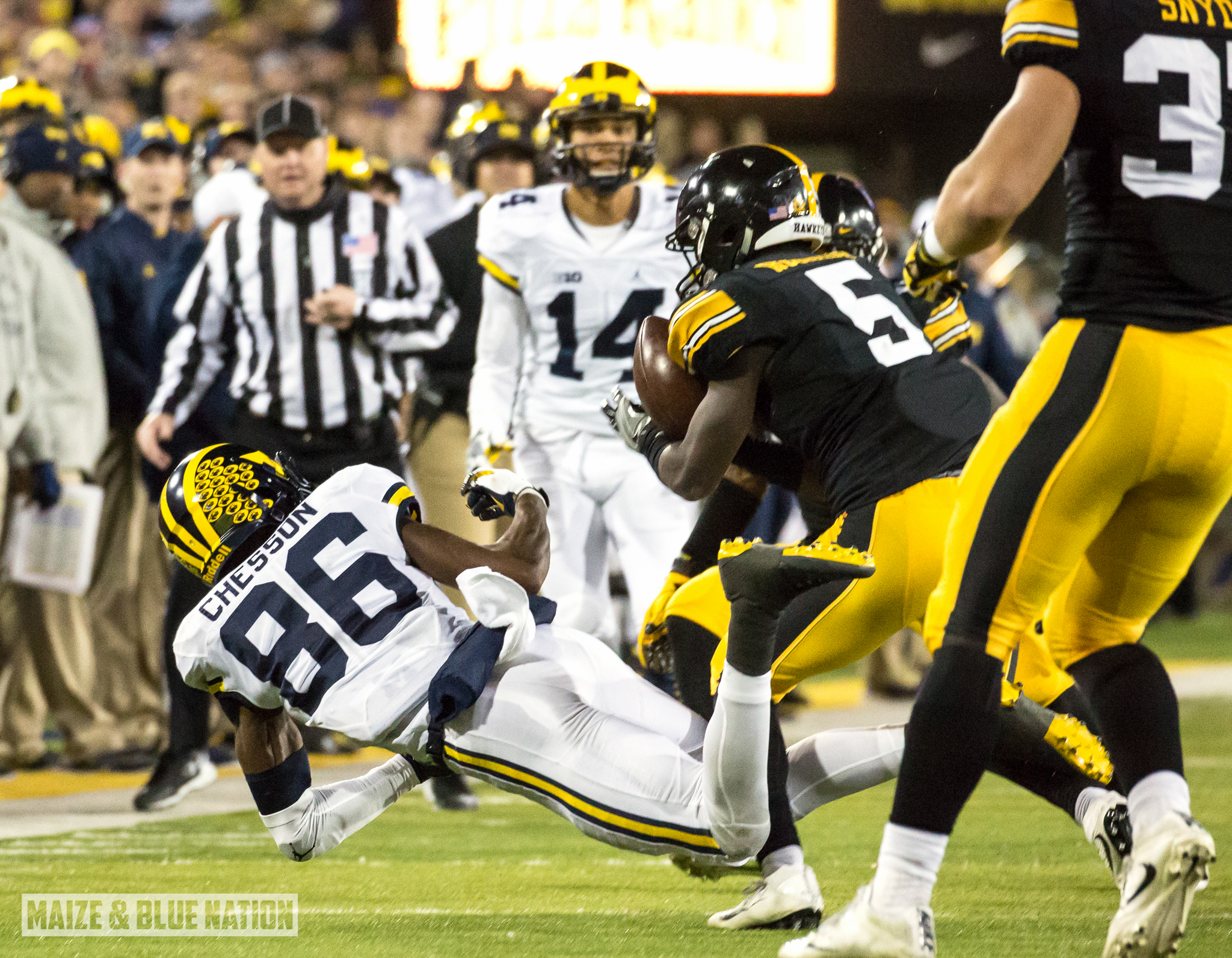
Manny Rugamba intercepts a Michigan pass in their upset loss to unranked Iowa in 2016.

Date	Time	Opponent	Rank	Site	TV	Result	Attendance
September 3	2:30 pm	Miami (OH)*	No. 17	Kinnick Stadium; Iowa City, IA	ESPNU	W 45–21	68,390
September 10	6:30 pm	Iowa State*	No. 16	Kinnick Stadium; Iowa City, IA (Cy-Hawk Series)	BTN	W 42–3	70,585
September 17	11:00 am	No. 1 (FCS) North Dakota State*	No. 13	Kinnick Stadium; Iowa City, IA	ESPN2	L 21–23	70,585
September 24	11:00 am	at Rutgers		High Point Solutions Stadium; Piscataway, NJ	ESPN2	W 14–7	44,061
October 1	11:00 am	Northwestern^{†}		Kinnick Stadium; Iowa City, IA	ESPNU	L 31–38	67,047
October 8	11:00 am	at Minnesota		TCF Bank Stadium; Minneapolis, MN (Floyd of Rosedale)	ESPN2	W 14–7	49,145
October 15	11:00 am	at Purdue		Ross–Ade Stadium; West Lafayette, IN	ESPN2	W 49–35	40,239
October 22	11:00 am	No. 10 Wisconsin		Kinnick Stadium; Iowa City, IA (Heartland Trophy)	ESPN	L 9–17	70,585
November 5	6:30 pm	at No. 20 Penn State		Beaver Stadium; University Park, PA	BTN	L 14–41	106,194
November 12	7:00 pm	No. 2 Michigan		Kinnick Stadium; Iowa City, IA	ABC	W 14–13	70,585
November 19	11:00 am	at Illinois		Memorial Stadium; Champaign, IL	BTN	W 28–0	39,031
November 25	2:30 pm	No. 17 Nebraska		Kinnick Stadium; Iowa City, IA (Heroes Trophy)	ABC	W 40–10	69,814
January 2	12:00 pm	vs. No. 20 Florida*	No. 21	Raymond James Stadium; Tampa, FL (Outback Bowl)	ABC	L 3–30	51,119
*Non-conference game; ^{†}Homecoming; Rankings from AP Poll released prior to game; All times are in Central time

Schedule source:

== Roster ==
2016 Iowa Hawkeyes football team roster
Players
Coaches
Offense

Pos.	#	Name	Class
QB	16	C. J. Beathard	Sr
QB	11	Ryan Boyle	Fr
QB	18	Drew Cook	Fr
QB	15	Ryan Schmidt	Fr
QB	4	Nathan Stanley	Fr
QB	8	Tyler Wiegers	So
RB	22	Toks Akinribade	Fr
RB	47	Lane Akre	Fr
RB	21	Sam Cook	Fr
RB	29	LeShun Daniels Jr.	Sr
RB	26	Marcel Joly	So
RB	41	Austin Kelly	So
RB	45	Drake Kulick	Jr
RB	30	Steve Manders	Fr
RB	32	Derrick Mitchell, Jr.	Jr
RB	36	Brady Ross	Fr
RB	25	Akrum Wadley	Jr
RB	28	Toren Young	Fr
WR	2	Brandon Bishop	So
WR	23	Dominique Dafney	So
WR	82	Adrian Falconer	So
WR	14	Conner Keane	Jr
WR	83	Riley McCarron	Sr
WR	5	Ronald Nash	So
WR	6	Emmanuel Ogwo	Fr
WR	10	Jonathan Parker	Jr
WR	3	Jay Scheel	Fr
WR	9	Jerminic Smith	So
WR	89	Matt VandeBerg (injured)	Sr
WR	80	Devonte Young	Fr
TE	42	Shaun Beyer	Fr
TE	87	Noah Fant	Fr
TE	38	T. J. Hockenson	Fr
TE	46	George Kittle	Sr
TE	86	Peter Pekar	Jr
TE	85	Nate Vejvoda	Fr
TE	39	Nate Wieting	Fr
TE	81	Jon Wisnieski	Jr
OL	61	Cole Banwart	Fr
OL	75	Ike Boettger	Jr
OL	64	Cole Croston	Sr
OL	78	James Daniels	So
OL	54	Steve Ferentz	Sr
OL	76	Dalton Ferguson	So
OL	77	Alaric Jackson	Fr
OL	74	Mitch Keppy	Sr
OL	70	Lucas LeGrand	So
OL	52	Boone Myers	Jr
OL	57	Jake Newborg	Fr
OL	68	Landan Paulsen	Fr
OL	66	Levi Paulsen	Fr
OL	56	Burke Prins	Fr
OL	69	Keegan Render	So
OL	59	Ross Reynolds	So
OL	71	Brett Waechter	Fr
OL	73	Ryan Ward	Sr
OL	79	Sean Welsh	Jr
OL	63	Spencer Williams	Fr

Defense

Pos.	#	Name	Class
DL	99	Nathan Bazata	Jr
DL	90	Sam Brincks	So
DL	56	Faith Ekakitie	Sr
DL	77	Daniel Gaffney	Jr
DL	60	Jacob Giese	Fr
DL	57	Chauncey Golston	Fr
DL	72	Brant Gressel	Sr
DL	40	Parker Hesse	So
DL	88	Jake Hulett	Jr
DL	66	Dallas Jacobus	Fr
DL	53	Garret Jansen	Fr
DL	67	Jaleel Johnson	Sr
DL	95	Cedrick Lattimore	Fr
DL	97	Romeo McKnight	Fr
DL	98	Anthony Nelson	Fr
DL	96	Matt Nelson	So
DL	91	Brady Reiff	Fr
DL	74	Austin Schulte	Fr
DL	93	Brandon Simon	Fr
DL	94	Michael Slater	Fr
LB	35	Tristan Bohr	Fr
LB	41	Bo Bower	Jr
LB	22	Angelo Garbutt	Fr
LB	45	Eric Grimm	So
LB	48	Jack Hockaday	So
LB	43	Josey Jewell	Jr
LB	52	Amani Jones	Fr
LB	31	Aaron Mends	So
LB	44	Ben Niemann	Jr
LB	49	Nick Niemann	Fr
LB	50	Jacob Sobotka	So
LB	55	Kyle Taylor	Sr
LB	35	Barrington Wade	Fr
LB	26	Kevin Ward	Jr
LB	34	Kristian Welch	Fr
LB	29	Nick Wilson	Fr
DB	4	Joe Argo	Fr
DB	20	Cedric Boswell	Fr
DB	12	Anthony Gair	Sr
DB	30	Jake Gervase	So
DB	27	Amani Hooker	Fr
DB	15	Joshua Jackson	So
DB	14	Desmond King	Sr
DB	9	Jonathan Lubanza	Fr
DB	13	Greg Mabin	Sr
DB	18	John Milani	Fr
DB	11	Michael Ojemudia	Fr
DB	5	Emmanuel Rugamba	Fr
DB	37	Brandon Snyder	So
DB	19	Miles Taylor	Jr

Special teams

Pos.	#	Name	Class
K	3	Keith Duncan	Fr
K	2	Mick Ellis	So
K	6	Josh Proehl	Fr
K	91	Miguel Recinos	So
K	94	Caleb Shudak	Fr
P	20	Ben Canby	Fr
P	16	Ron Coluzzi	Sr
P	7	Colten Rastetter	Fr
P	25	Jackson Terry	Fr
LS	97	Tyler Kluver	Jr
LS	84	Austin Spiewak	Fr
LS	50	Jackson Subbert	Fr

Head coach

- Kirk Ferentz

Coordinators/assistant coaches

- Greg Davis – Offensive coordinator/quarterbacks
- Phil Parker – Defensive coordinator/defensive backs
- Chris White – Special teams coordinator/running backs
- Chris Doyle – Strength and conditioning
- Kelvin Bell – Recruiting coordinator/Assistant Defensive Line
- Bobby Kennedy – Wide receivers
- LeVar Woods – Tight ends
- Brian Ferentz – Offensive line/run game coordinator
- Reese Morgan – Defensive line
- Seth Wallace – Linebackers coach
- Paul Federici – Director of football operations
- Tyler Anderson – Graduate assistant, Defense
- Raimond Braithwaite – Strength and conditioning assistant coach
- Justin Lima – Strength and conditioning assistant coach
- Joel Welsh, Jr. – Strength and conditioning assistant coach
- Ben Hansen – Assistant director of football operations
- Max Allen – Director, football new media
- Broderick Binns- – Director, Player Development
- Tyler Barnes – Director, recruiting
- Scott Southmayd – Director, player personnel
- Bob Rahfeldt – Video Coordinator
- Chris Ruth – Assistant video coordinator

Legend

- (C) Team captain
- (S) Suspended
- (I) Ineligible
- Injured
- Redshirt

Roster
Last update: February 8, 2016

== Rankings ==
Ranking movements Legend: ██ Increase in ranking ██ Decrease in ranking — = Not ranked RV = Received votes
	Week															
Poll	Pre	1	2	3	4	5	6	7	8	9	10	11	12	13	14	Final
AP	17	16	13	RV	RV	—	RV	RV	—	—	—	RV	RV	22	21	RV
Coaches	15	10	11	25	RV	—	—	RV	—	—	—	RV	RV	25	25	RV
CFP	Not released									—	—	—	—	—	—	Not released

== Game summaries ==
=== Miami (OH) ===
Miami (OH) at Iowa

Team	1	2	3	4	Total
RedHawks	0	7	7	7	21
• No. 17 Hawkeyes	21	7	7	10	45

- Date: September 3
- Location: Kinnick Stadium
  Iowa City, IA
- Game start: 2:30 p.m. CDT
- Elapsed time: 3:09
- Game attendance: 68,390
- Game weather: 75 °F (24 °C), Partly Cloudy, Wind S 5–10 mph (8.0–16.1 km/h)
- Referee: Mark Kluczynski
- TV announcers (ESPNU): Eamon McAnaney, John Congemi
- Source: Box Score

Scoring summary
1	9:07	Iowa	LeShun Daniels Jr. 1-yard run (Keith Duncan kick)	Iowa 7–0
1	7:14	Iowa	Akrum Wadley 11-yard run (Keith Duncan kick)	Iowa 14–0
1	5:41	Iowa	LeShun Daniels Jr. 43-yard run (Keith Duncan kick)	Iowa 21–0
2	13:42	Miami (OH)	Alonzo Smith 3-yard run (Nick Dowd kick)	Iowa 21–7
2	7:15	Iowa	Akrum Wadley 5-yard run (Keith Duncan kick)	Iowa 28–7
3	11:37	Iowa	Jerminic Smith 12-yard pass from C.J. Beathard (Keith Duncan kick)	Iowa 35–7
3	4:41	Miami (OH)	James Gardner 29-yard pass from Billy Bahl (Nick Dowd kick)	Iowa 35–14
4	9:43	Miami (OH)	James Gardner 8-yard pass from Billy Bahl (Nick Dowd kick)	Iowa 35–21
4	6:04	Iowa	Keith Duncan 22-yard field goal	Iowa 38–21
4	3:08	Iowa	Derrick Mitchell Jr. 5-yard run (Keith Duncan kick)	Iowa 45–21

Fresh off a season that saw Iowa go to the Big Ten Championship as well as the Rose Bowl, the Hawkeyes got off to a fast start against MAC foe Miami-Ohio. The Hawkeyes scored three touchdowns – all on the ground – in the first 10 minutes of the game, and continued to run all over the RedHawks defense for a 28–7 halftime lead. From there, quarterback C. J. Beathard and the offense continued to roll as the Hawkeyes cruised to an easy 45–21 win in the 2016 season opener. LeShun Daniels and Akrum Wadley combined to run for over 200 yards on 22 carries, scoring two rushing touchdowns apiece. Redshirt freshman DE Anthony Nelson recorded 2.5 sacks and 2 forced fumbles to earn Big Ten Freshman of the Week honors.

Statistics	M-OH	IOWA
First downs	25	17
Total yards	424	404
Rushing yards	158	212
Passing yards	266	192
Turnovers	3	0
Time of possession	36:21	23:39

Team	Category	Player	Statistics
Miami (OH)	Passing	Billy Bahl	19/29, 266 yards, 2 TD
Miami (OH)	Rushing	Maurice Thomas	9 carries, 60 yards
Miami (OH)	Receiving	R. Williams	6 receptions, 113 yards
Iowa	Passing	C. J. Beathard	13/20, 192 yards, TD
Iowa	Rushing	Akrum Wadley	12 carries, 121 yards, 2 TD
Iowa	Receiving	Matt VandeBerg	4 receptions, 99 yards

=== Iowa State ===
Iowa State at Iowa
Cy-Hawk Trophy

Team	1	2	3	4	Total
Cyclones	3	0	0	0	3
• No. 16 Hawkeyes	14	14	14	0	42

- Date: September 10
- Location: Kinnick Stadium
  Iowa City, IA
- Game start: 6:42 p.m. CDT
- Elapsed time: 3:15
- Game attendance: 70,585
- Game weather: 72 °F (22 °C), Sunny, Wind NW 12 mph (19 km/h)
- Referee: Mike Defee
- TV announcers (BTN): Kevin Kugler, Matt Millen, Chuck Long, Lisa Byington
- Source: Box Score

Scoring summary
1	8:42	Iowa	George Kittle 9-yard pass from C.J. Beathard (Keith Duncan kick)	Iowa 7–0
1	5:42	Iowa	Akrum Wadley 26-yard pass from C.J. Beathard (Keith Duncan kick)	Iowa 14–0
1	0:32	ISU	Cole Netten 31-yard field goal	Iowa 14–3
2	10:15	Iowa	Matt VandeBerg 12-yard pass from C.J. Beathard (Keith Duncan kick)	Iowa 21–3
2	2:17	Iowa	C.J. Beathard 1-yard run (Keith Duncan kick)	Iowa 28–3
3	3:18	Iowa	Akrum Wadley 3-yard run (Keith Duncan kick)	Iowa 35–3
3	1:33	Iowa	LeShun Daniels 43-yard run (Keith Duncan kick)	Iowa 42–3

The Hawkeyes scored early and often as they dominated Iowa State in the annual Cy-Hawk game. The Hawkeyes scored two touchdowns in the first, with the first one going to tight end George Kittle and the other one coming on a long pass to running back Akrum Wadley. The Hawkeyes continued to pour it on as Beathard threw his third TD pass of the first half to Matt VandeBerg, and would run in another score to give Iowa a commanding 28–3 lead at halftime. Iowa would score twice more in the third quarter and the defense hounded the Iowa State offense all game long, and the result was a dismantling of the Hawkeyes' in-state rival from Ames. The 39-point margin of victory was the largest in the series since Iowa's 63–20 win in 1997.

Statistics	ISU	IOWA
First downs	16	25
Total yards	291	435
Rushing yards	126	198
Passing yards	165	237
Turnovers	1	0
Time of possession	27:52	32:08

Team	Category	Player	Statistics
Iowa State	Passing	Joel Lanning	8/20, 86 yards, INT
Iowa State	Rushing	Kene Nwangwu	7 rushes, 31 yards
Iowa State	Receiving	Allen Lazard	7 receptions, 111 yards
Iowa	Passing	C. J. Beathard	19/28, 235 yards, 3 TD
Iowa	Rushing	LeShun Daniels	15 rushes, 112 yards, TD
Iowa	Receiving	Matt VandeBerg	7 receptions, 129 yards, TD

=== North Dakota State ===
North Dakota State at Iowa

Team	1	2	3	4	Total
• No. 1 (FCS) Bison	7	0	7	9	23
No. 13 Hawkeyes	0	14	7	0	21

- Date: September 17
- Location: Kinnick Stadium
  Iowa City, IA
- Game start: 11:01 a.m. CDT
- Elapsed time: 3:05
- Game attendance: 70,585
- Game weather: 71 °F (22 °C), Sunny, Wind W 10 mph (16 km/h)
- Referee: Rod Snodgrass
- TV announcers (ESPN2): Beth Mowins, Anthony Becht, Rocky Boiman
- Source: Box Score

Scoring summary
1	2:26	NDSU	MJ Stumpf 21-yard interception return (Cam Pedersen kick)	NDSU 7–0
2	13:03	Iowa	Riley McCarron 30-yard pass from C.J. Beathard (Keith Duncan kick)	Tied 7–7
2	8:05	Iowa	Matt VandeBerg 14-yard pass from C.J. Beathard (Keith Duncan kick)	Iowa 14–7
3	8:06	NDSU	King Frazier 1-yard run (Cam Pedersen kick)	Tied 14–14
3	2:12	Iowa	Matt VandeBerg 9-yard pass from C.J. Beathard (Keith Duncan kick)	Iowa 21–14
4	3:41	NDSU	Chase Morlock 7-yard pass from Easton Stick (Stick pass failed)	Iowa 21–20
4	0:00	NDSU	Cam Pedersen 37-yard field goal	NDSU 23–21

Fresh off an easy win over Iowa State, the Hawkeyes welcomed in FCS powerhouse North Dakota State into Kinnick Stadium. The Bison struck first as C. J. Beathard threw a pick-6 to M. J. Stumpf late in the first quarter, however Iowa tied the game at 7–7 when Beathard found Riley McCarron for a 30-yard touchdown on a 4th down play. On the next drive, Beathard would connect with Matt VandeBerg for a 14-yard score and Iowa went into halftime leading 14–7. The teams traded touchdowns in the third, with King Frazier tying up the game for the Bison, and Matt VandeBerg putting Iowa ahead 21–14 with his 2nd touchdown reception of the game in traffic. But the Bison grinded out a long drive that took over 8 minutes of clock in the 4th quarter and ended with a touchdown. However, NDSU went for two and was unsuccessful, and the Hawkeyes clung to a 21–20 lead. After forcing a three-and-out, Easton Stick led North Dakota State right down the field and kicker Cam Pedersen nailed a 37-yard field goal as time expired to give the Bison a 23–21 victory. For North Dakota State, it was their sixth consecutive victory over an FBS opponent. It was the first time Iowa lost a game to an FCS opponent, and was the first regular season loss in Iowa quarterback C. J. Beathard's career.

Statistics	NDSU	IOWA
First downs	21	12
Total yards	363	231
Rushing yards	239	34
Passing yards	124	197
Turnovers	1	1
Time of possession	36:40	23:20

Team	Category	Player	Statistics
North Dakota State	Passing	Easton Stick	11/19, 124 yards, TD, INT
North Dakota State	Rushing	King Frazier	16 rushes, 99 yards, TD
North Dakota State	Receiving	D. Shepherd	3 receptions, 23 yards
Iowa	Passing	C. J. Beathard	11/22, 152 yards, 3 TD, INT
Iowa	Rushing	LeShun Daniels	14 rushes, 29 yards
Iowa	Receiving	George Kittle	5 receptions, 110 yards

=== At Rutgers ===
Iowa at Rutgers

Team	1	2	3	4	Total
• Hawkeyes	0	7	0	7	14
Scarlet Knights	0	0	0	7	7

- Date: September 24
- Location: High Point Solutions Stadium
  Piscataway, NJ
- Game start: 12:01 p.m. EDT
- Elapsed time: 3:16
- Game attendance: 44,061
- Game weather: 64°, Partly Sunny, Wind N 10 mph (16 km/h)
- Referee: John O'Neill
- TV announcers (ESPN2): Beth Mowins, Anthony Becht, Rocky Boiman
- Source: Box Score

Scoring summary
2	0:34	Iowa	George Kittle 36-yard pass from C.J. Beathard (Keith Duncan kick)	Iowa 7–0
4	12:45	Rutgers	Andre Patton 14-yard pass from Chris Laviano (David Bonagura kick)	Tied 7–7
4	8:35	Iowa	Akrum Wadley 26-yard run (Keith Duncan kick)	Iowa 14–7

Coming off a disappointing home loss to North Dakota State, Iowa hit the road for the first time in the 2016 season to take on the Rutgers Scarlet Knights. The first half was a major defensive struggle as neither team scored until George Kittle hauled in a 36-yard touchdown pass from C. J. Beathard, capping a 99-yard touchdown drive and putting Iowa up 7–0 at the break. The defense finally cracked early in the 4th when Chris Laviano found Andre Patton for a 14-yard touchdown to tie the game at 7–7. However, the Hawkeyes answered right back with a 26-yard Akrum Wadley touchdown run that put Iowa up 14–7 with 8:35 left. The defense stopped Rutgers once more and Iowa was able to get a couple first downs, something they were not able to do the week before, and held on for a 14–7 victory in its Big Ten opener. The Iowa defense had 4 sacks, and 8 tackles for loss in the win. Punter Ron Coluzzi earned Big Ten Special Teams Player of the Week honors.

Statistics	IOWA	RUT
First downs	19	21
Total yards	355	383
Rushing yards	193	193
Passing yards	162	190
Turnovers	0	1
Time of possession	29:19	30:41

Team	Category	Player	Statistics
Iowa	Passing	C. J. Beathard	12/23, 162 yards, TD
Iowa	Rushing	Akrum Wadley	12 rushes, 84 yards, TD
Iowa	Receiving	George Kittle	2 receptions, 56 yards, TD
Rutgers	Passing	Chris Laviano	13/24, 190 yards, TD
Rutgers	Rushing	Robert Martin	21 rushes, 106 yards
Rutgers	Receiving	Janarion Grant	5 receptions, 98 yards

=== Northwestern ===
Northwestern at Iowa
Homecoming

Team	1	2	3	4	Total
• Wildcats	10	7	14	7	38
Hawkeyes	7	14	3	7	31

- Date: October 1
- Location: Kinnick Stadium
  Iowa City, IA
- Game start: 11:01 a.m. CDT
- Elapsed time: 3:25
- Game attendance: 67,047
- Game weather: 62°, Overcast, Wind N 6 mph (9.7 km/h)
- Referee: Jerry McGinn
- TV announcers (ESPNU): Eamon McAnaney, John Congemi
- Source: Box Score

Scoring summary
1	12:20	Northwestern	Clayton Thorson 4-yard run (Jack Mitchell kick)	Northwestern 7–0
1	5:07	Iowa	Akrum Wadley 5-yard run (Keith Duncan kick)	Tied 7–7
1	0:50	Northwestern	Jack Mitchell 25-yard field goal	Northwestern 10–7
2	10:33	Northwestern	Austin Carr 11-yard pass from Clayton Thorson (Jack Mitchell kick)	Northwestern 17–7
2	5:02	Iowa	Akrum Wadley 6-yard run (Keith Duncan kick)	Northwestern 17–14
2	2:51	Iowa	Riley McCarron 15-yard pass from C.J. Beathard (Keith Duncan kick)	Iowa 21–17
3	11:29	Iowa	Keith Duncan 24-yard field goal	Iowa 24–17
3	6:15	Northwestern	Austin Carr 16-yard pass from Clayton Thorson (Jack Mitchell kick)	Tied 24–24
3	2:07	Northwestern	Justin Jackson 58-yard run (Jack Mitchell kick)	Northwestern 31–24
4	12:06	Northwestern	Austin Carr 25-yard pass from Clayton Thorson (Jack Mitchell kick)	Northwestern 38–24
4	8:10	Iowa	LeShun Daniels Jr. 1-yard run (Keith Duncan kick)	Northwestern 38–31

Iowa returned home to take on Northwestern in its fifth game of the year. Northwestern had been off to a slow start on the season, especially offensively, but the team seemed to wake up for the Iowa game. Clayton Thorson got the scoring started with a 4-yard touchdown run to put the Wildcats up 7–0. Akrum Wadley would answer that with a touchdown run of his own. The first half featured a lot of offense as Northwestern took a 17–7 lead, only to see it disappear quickly as Wadley scored again, and the Hawkeyes capitalized on a fumble by Justin Jackson as C. J. Beathard found Riley McCarron in the end zone for a 15-yard touchdown and Iowa went into halftime up 21–17. However, the Iowa defense could not stop the Wildcat offense, and they scored on three consecutive series. Austin Carr hauled in a 16-yard touchdown catch with a terrific catch in the corner of the end zone to tie the game at 24–24, and then on the next drive Justin Jackson broke free and scored from 58 yards out to give Northwestern the lead back. Carr then hauled in his third touchdown of the game and Northwestern went up 38–24. LeShun Daniels cut the lead to 38–31 with a 1-yard touchdown run, but a last ditch effort by the Hawkeyes to come back was thwarted when Beathard was intercepted with 58 seconds left. The win snapped a three-game losing streak for Northwestern at Kinnick Stadium, while the loss dropped Iowa to 3–2, 1–1 in Big Ten play.

Statistics	NU	IOWA
First downs	20	15
Total yards	362	283
Rushing yards	198	79
Passing yards	164	204
Turnovers	1	1
Time of possession	28:21	31:39

Team	Category	Player	Statistics
Northwestern	Passing	Clayton Thorson	18–30, 164 yards, 3 TD
Northwestern	Rushing	Justin Jackson	26 carries, 171 yards, TD
Northwestern	Receiving	Austin Carr	6 receptions, 73 yards, 3 TD
Iowa	Passing	C. J. Beathard	19–27, 204 yards, TD, INT
Iowa	Rushing	LeShun Daniels	17 carries, 72 yards, TD
Iowa	Receiving	Riley McCarron	8 receptions, 78 yards, TD

=== At Minnesota ===
Iowa at Minnesota
Floyd of Rosedale

Team	1	2	3	4	Total
• Hawkeyes	0	3	3	8	14
Golden Gophers	0	0	7	0	7

- Date: October 8
- Location: TCF Bank Stadium
  Minneapolis, MN
- Game start: 11:01 a.m. CDT
- Elapsed time: 3:14
- Game attendance: 49,145
- Game weather: 46°, Sunsplashed and cool, Wind N 6 mph (9.7 km/h)
- Referee: Dan Capron
- TV announcers (ESPN2): Beth Mowins, Anthony Becht, Rocky Boiman
- Source: Box Score

Scoring summary
2	13:32	Iowa	Keith Duncan 22-yard field goal	Iowa 3–0
3	10:10	Iowa	Keith Duncan 28-yard field goal	Iowa 6–0
3	6:17	Minnesota	Shannon Brooks 9-yard run (Emmit Carpenter kick)	Minnesota 7–6
4	5:28	Iowa	Akrum Wadley 54-yard run (LeShun Daniels run)	Iowa 14–7

Iowa went back to the road as they looked to defeat their rival Minnesota Golden Gophers for the second consecutive season. Iowa had a good drive early, but were unable to get points as long distance kicker Miguel Recinos missed a 50-yard field goal badly. However, Iowa would get on the board first as Keith Duncan hit a short field goal for a 3–0 halftime lead. Iowa once again moved the ball, but have a drive stall and it settled for another short field goal by Duncan for a 6–0 lead. However, Minnesota answered with its best drive of the game, and the Gophers took the lead on a 9-yard touchdown run by Shannon Brooks. This was a game of missed opportunities as Iowa repeatedly moved the ball, but could not come up with points. Riley McCarron lost a fumble inside the Minnesota 35 yard-line after a long reception and C. J. Beathard threw an ill-advised interception with Iowa at the Minnesota 27. Iowa was finally able to break through as Akrum Wadley broke free for a 54-yard touchdown run, and an ensuing two-point conversion gave the Hawkeyes a 14–7 lead. The Iowa defense was able to stop an attempt by Minnesota to tie the game late, and the Hawkeyes held on for a 14–7 win and kept possession of the Floyd of Rosedale Trophy.

Statistics	IOWA	MINN
First downs	17	13
Total yards	321	268
Rushing yards	179	102
Passing yards	142	166
Turnovers	3	3
Time of possession	34:55	25:05

Team	Category	Player	Statistics
Iowa	Passing	C. J. Beathard	17/31, 142 yards, 2 INT
Iowa	Rushing	Akrum Wadley	14 rushes, 107 yards, TD
Iowa	Receiving	Riley McCarron	6 receptions, 62 yards
Minnesota	Passing	Mitch Leidner	13/33, 166 yards, 2 INT
Minnesota	Rushing	Shannon Brooks	10 rushes, 55 yards, TD
Minnesota	Receiving	Drew Wolitarsky	5 receptions, 58 yards

=== At Purdue ===
Iowa at Purdue

Team	1	2	3	4	Total
• Hawkeyes	21	14	7	7	49
Boilermakers	0	7	7	21	35

- Date: October 15
- Location: Ross–Ade Stadium
  West Lafayette, IN
- Game start: 12:01 p.m. EDT
- Elapsed time: 3:45
- Game attendance: 40,239
- Game weather: 67°, Cloudy, Wind SSW 14
- Referee: Mike Cannon
- TV announcers (ESPN2): Anish Shroff, Tom Ramsey, Kevin Weidl
- Source: Box Score

Scoring summary
1	8:57	Iowa	LeShun Daniels 1-yard run (Keith Duncan kick)	Iowa 7–0
1	2:20	Iowa	C.J. Beathard 15-yard run (Keith Duncan kick)	Iowa 14–0
1	0:09	Iowa	Riley McCarron 42-yard pass from C.J. Beathard (Keith Duncan kick)	Iowa 21–0
2	3:48	Iowa	LeShun Daniels 4-yard run (Keith Duncan kick)	Iowa 28–0
2	1:29	Purdue	Brycen Hopkins 25-yard pass from David Blough (J.D Dellinger kick)	Iowa 28–7
2	1:18	Iowa	Akrum Wadley 75-yard run (Keith Duncan kick)	Iowa 35–7
3	8:06	Purdue	Cole Herdman 53-yard pass from David Blough (J.D. Dellinger kick)	Iowa 35–14
3	6:07	Iowa	Noah Fant 5-yard pass from C.J. Beathard (Keith Duncan kick)	Iowa 42–14
4	8:40	Purdue	Bilal Marshall 7-yard pass from David Blough (J.D. Dellinger kick)	Iowa 42–21
4	5:36	Purdue	Yancey 54-yard pass from David Blough (J.D. Dellinger kick)	Iowa 42–28
4	1:44	Iowa	Desmond King 41-yard interception return (Keith Duncan kick)	Iowa 49–28
4	0:17	Purdue	Brycen Hopkins 37-yard pass from David Blough (J.D. Dellinger kick)	Iowa 49–35

Iowa defeated the Boilermakers in a high scoring affair, 49–35. Iowa opened up the scoring with a 1-yard run by LeShun Daniels. Iowa increased their lead with a 3rd down scramble for a 15-yard touchdown run by C. J. Beathard. After a quick 3-and-out by Purdue, Iowa scored again on a 42-yard Beathard pass to Riley McCarron, closing out the first quarter scoring. After several exchanges of punts, Iowa scored again on a 4-yard run by Daniels. Purdue scored their first points of the game with a 25-yard pass from David Blough to Brycen Hopkins. After the kickoff after the Hopkins touchdown, Iowa scored on its first play with a 75-yard Akrum Wadley touchdown run to bring the halftime score to 35–7 in favor of Iowa. Purdue opened up the second half scoring with a 53-yard Blough pass to Cole Herdman. Iowa responded with a 5-yard Noah Fant touchdown reception from Beathard. Purdue scored again on a 7-yard pass from Blough to Bilal Marshall. After a 3-and-out by Iowa, who had put in their reserves, Purdue scored again on a 54-yard Blough pass to DeAngelo Yancey. After yet another 3-and-out, Iowa put in their starting defensive unit. Blough was intercepted by Desmond King, who returned the interception 41-yards for an Iowa score, increasing their lead to 21 again. Purdue scored once more with another Hopkins touchdown reception from Blough for 37-yards.

Statistics	IOWA	PUR
First downs	24	24
Total yards	520	505
Rushing yards	365	47
Passing yards	155	458
Turnovers	0	1
Time of possession	36:06	23:54

Team	Category	Player	Statistics
Iowa	Passing	C. J. Beathard	10/17, 140 yards, 2 TD
Iowa	Rushing	Akrum Wadley	15 rushes, 176 yards, TD
Iowa	Receiving	Riley McCarron	7 receptions, 74 yards, TD
Purdue	Passing	David Blough	30/59, 458 yards, 5 TD, INT
Purdue	Rushing	Markell Jones	9 rushes, 33 yards
Purdue	Receiving	Cole Herdman	7 receptions, 104 yards, TD

=== No. 10 Wisconsin ===
Wisconsin at Iowa
Heartland Trophy

Team	1	2	3	4	Total
• No. 10 Badgers	0	7	7	3	17
Hawkeyes	0	6	0	3	9

- Date: October 22
- Location: Kinnick Stadium
  Iowa City, IA
- Game start: 11:01 a.m. CDT
- Elapsed time: 3:25
- Game attendance: 70,585
- Game weather: 49°, Clear Skies, Wind S 9 mph (14 km/h)
- Referee: Jeffrey Servinski
- TV announcers (ESPN): Steve Levy, Brian Griese, Todd McShay
- Source: Box Score

Scoring summary
2	10:06	Wisconsin	Troy Fumagalli 17-yard pass from Bart Houston (Andrew Endicott kick)	Wisconsin 7–0
2	3:49	Iowa	Keith Duncan 41-yard field goal	Wisconsin 7–3
2	0:00	Iowa	Miguel Recinos 47-yard field goal	Wisconsin 7–6
3	7:20	Wisconsin	Corey Clement 1-yard run (Andrew Endicott kick)	Wisconsin 14–6
4	1:24	Wisconsin	Andrew Endicott 36-yard field goal	Wisconsin 17–6
4	0:43	Iowa	Keith Duncan 25-yard field goal	Wisconsin 17–9

Iowa came into its matchup with #10 Wisconsin fresh off back-to-back road wins while the Badgers were coming off back-to-back tough losses at Michigan and at home to Ohio State in overtime. Early on, the Badgers were able to move up and down the field, but were unable to capitalize. Their first drive stalled when kicker Andrew Endicott missed a 32-yard field goal. Wisconsin did not get on the board until Bart Houston hit tight end Troy Fumagalli for a 17-yard touchdown with 10:06 left in the second. Iowa would answer that with a 41-yard field goal from Keith Duncan. Wisconsin continued to miss its opportunities as Corey Clement fumbled inside the Iowa 1 right before the half, and Iowa turned that into a field goal and despite getting significantly outgained, Iowa only went into halftime trailing 7–6. Wisconsin continued to move the ball in the second half, as Corey Clement was able to score this time from the 1 and the Badgers extended their lead to 14–6. With about 5 minutes left in the 4th, Iowa coach Kirk Ferentz decided to kick a field goal on 4th & 5 on the Wisconsin 20, instead of going for it and Keith Duncan missed a 38-yard field goal. From there, Wisconsin was able to make a field goal of their own to essentially put the game on ice. Iowa was able to get a field goal late in the game but Wisconsin recovered the ensuing onside kick and was able to hang on for the 17–9 win. For Iowa, it was their third consecutive loss at Kinnick Stadium and dropped them to 5–3, 3–2 heading into their bye week. The win snapped a two-game losing streak for Wisconsin and was also the team's fourth consecutive win in Kinnick.

Statistics	WIS	IOWA
First downs	20	14
Total yards	423	236
Rushing yards	167	83
Passing yards	256	153
Turnovers	1	0
Time of possession	37:02	22:58

Team	Category	Player	Statistics
Wisconsin	Passing	Alex Hornibrook	11–19, 197 yards
Wisconsin	Rushing	Corey Clement	35 carries, 134 yards, TD
Wisconsin	Receiving	Dare Ogunbowale	4 receptions, 51 yards
Iowa	Passing	C. J. Beathard	17–33, 153 yards
Iowa	Rushing	Akrum Wadley	10 carries, 44 yards
Iowa	Receiving	Akrum Wadley	7 receptions, 72 yards

=== at No. 20 Penn State ===
Iowa at Penn State

Team	1	2	3	4	Total
Hawkeyes	0	7	0	7	14
• No. 20 Nittany Lions	7	17	3	14	41

- Date: November 5
- Location: Beaver Stadium
  University Park, PA
- Game start: 7:30 p.m. EDT
- Elapsed time: 3:08
- Game attendance: 106,194
- Game weather: 56°, Clear, Wind WNW 10
- Referee: Rod Snodgrass
- TV announcers (BTN): Kevin Kugler (play-by-play), Matt Millen (analyst), Lisa Byington (sideline)
- Source: Box Score

Scoring summary
1	12:53	Penn State	Saeed Blacknall 19-yard TD pass from Trace McSorley (Tyler Davis kick)	Penn State 7–0
2	10:28	Penn State	Saquon Barkley 57-yard run (Tyler Davis kick)	Penn State 14–0
2	7:58	Penn State	Trace McSorley 1-yard run (Tyler Davis kick)	Penn State 21–0
2	4:18	Iowa	Akrum Wadley 12-yard pass from C.J. Beathard (Keith Duncan kick)	Penn State 21–7
2	0:00	Penn State	Tyler Davis 30-yard field goal	Penn State 24–7
3	2:48	Penn State	Tyler Davis 37-yard field goal	Penn State 27–7
4	14:41	Penn State	Saquon Barkley 44-yard pass from Trace McSorley (Tyler Davis kick)	Penn State 34–7
4	9:28	Penn State	Tommy Stevens 13-yard run (Tyler Davis kick)	Penn State 41–7
4	6:30	Iowa	Jerminic Smith 36-yard pass from C.J. Beathard (Keith Duncan kick)	Penn State 41–14

Iowa traveled to Happy Valley for a night game against Penn State. Throughout much of the game, Iowa was completely dominated by Penn State. On the very first drive, Penn State marched right down the field for a touchdown drive that ended with Trace McSorley finding Saeed Blacknall for a score. Saquon Barkley continued to run all over the Hawkeyes as he broke free for a 57-yard touchdown run to extend the lead to 14–0. Soon after, McSorley scored from 1 yard out and the Nittany Lions were rolling, up 21–0. Iowa got a much needed touchdown late in the half when Beathard found Akrum Wadley for a 12-yard touchdown to get Iowa on the board. However, Penn State answered right back with a field goal to head into halftime up 24–7. The second half was much of the same as Saquon Barkley caught a long pass from McSorley for another touchdown. Backup quarterback Tommy Stevens even got in on the fun and added a rushing touchdown of his own as Penn State crushed the Hawkeyes, winning 41–14. Barkley and McSorley combined for nearly 450 yards and Penn State racked up 599 yards of offense on the Hawkeyes. It was the second consecutive loss for Iowa, who dropped to 5–4, 3–3 in the Big Ten and a matchup with the undefeated Michigan Wolverines upcoming. Penn State continued to play great football, getting its fifth straight win and the second straight blowout for the Lions after they defeated #2 and previously undefeated Ohio State two weeks earlier.

Statistics	IOWA	PSU
First downs	14	24
Total yards	234	599
Rushing yards	30	359
Passing yards	204	240
Turnovers	1	0
Time of possession	24:57	35:03

Team	Category	Player	Statistics
Iowa	Passing	C. J. Beathard	18/26, 204 yards, 2 TD, INT
Iowa	Rushing	Akrum Wadley	9 rushes, 28 yards
Iowa	Receiving	Jerminic Smith	5 receptions, 85 yards, TD
Penn State	Passing	Trace McSorley	11/18, 240 yards, 2 TD
Penn State	Rushing	Saquon Barkley	20 rushes, 167 yards, TD
Penn State	Receiving	Chris Godwin	4 receptions, 87 yards

=== No. 2 Michigan ===
Michigan at Iowa

Team	1	2	3	4	Total
No. 2 Wolverines	3	7	0	3	13
• Hawkeyes	0	8	3	3	14

- Date: November 12
- Location: Kinnick Stadium
  Iowa City, IA
- Game start: 7:12 p.m. CST
- Elapsed time: 3:19
- Game attendance: 70,585
- Game weather: 41°, Mostly Cloudy, Wind S 4 mph (6.4 km/h)
- Referee: John O'Neill
- TV announcers (ABC): Chris Fowler, Kirk Herbstreit, Sam Ponder
- Source: Box Score

Scoring summary
1	4:00	Michigan	Kenny Allen 26-yard field goal	Michigan 3–0
2	8:56	Michigan	Ty Isaac 7-yard run (Allen kick)	Michigan 10–0
2	6:31	Iowa	Team safety	Michigan 10–2
2	1:27	Iowa	Akrum Wadley 3-yard pass from C.J. Beathard (Two-point pass conversion failed)	Michigan 10–8
3	9:55	Iowa	Keith Duncan 25-yard field goal	Iowa 11–10
4	9:35	Michigan	Kenny Allen 51-yard field goal	Michigan 13–11
4	0:00	Iowa	Keith Duncan 33-yard field goal	Iowa 14–13

A week after being humbled on the road and in the midst of a 3-game home losing streak, Iowa returned home to face the undefeated and third-ranked Michigan Wolverines. Iowa fell behind 10–0 in the second quarter, thanks to a Ty Isaac 7-yard touchdown run. Defensive tackle Jaleel Johnson gave Iowa some momentum when he tackled De'Veon Smith in the end zone for a safety. Later, C. J. Beathard converted a 4th and goal by completing a screen pass to Akrum Wadley for a 3-yard touchdown. The two-point conversion was unsuccessful and Iowa trailed 10–8 at halftime. However, Iowa continued to control the game and Wadley was a force for Iowa, and Iowa took an 11–10 lead into the 4th quarter. Michigan kicker Kenny Allen put them back in front with a 50-yard field goal midway through the 4th quarter, but Iowa would not go away. With Iowa driving for the game-winning score, quarterback C. J. Beathard was intercepted by Michigan cornerback Channing Stribling with 1:54 left. However, Iowa forced a Michigan punt, and the Wolverines committed a costly penalty on a punt return by Desmond King to set up Iowa with terrific field position. From there, Iowa got two first downs and freshman kicker Keith Duncan drilled a 33-yard field goal as time expired to deliver Iowa a shocking 14–13 upset of Michigan.

Akrum Wadley was the offensive standout for the Hawkeyes with 115 yards rushing, and another 52 yards receiving that included the touchdown late in the first half. The Hawkeye defense did their part as well, allowing only 201 total yards to a Wolverine offense that was averaging over 400 per game going into the contest. Senior DT Jaleel Johnson was named Big Ten Defensive Player of the Week, Duncan was named Big Ten Special Teams Player of the Week, and Manny Rugamba was named Big Ten co-Freshman of the Week.

With Clemson and Washington both losing, this marked only the second time #2, #3, and #4 fell during the same day in the regular-season. The other time was October 19, 1985, and one of the games that day was #1 Iowa's 12–10 win over #2 Michigan.

Statistics	MICH	IOWA
First downs	14	17
Total yards	201	230
Rushing yards	98	164
Passing yards	103	66
Turnovers	2	1
Time of possession	27:15	32:45

Team	Category	Player	Statistics
Michigan	Passing	Wilton Speight	11–26, 103 yards, INT
Michigan	Rushing	Chris Evans	8 carries, 52 yards
Michigan	Receiving	Jake Butt	4 receptions, 39 yards
Iowa	Passing	C. J. Beathard	8–19, 66 yards, TD, INT
Iowa	Rushing	Akrum Wadley	23 carries, 115 yards
Iowa	Receiving	Akrum Wadley	5 receptions, 52 yards, TD

=== At Illinois ===
Iowa at Illinois

Team	1	2	3	4	Total
• Hawkeyes	0	7	7	14	28
Fighting Illini	0	0	0	0	0

- Date: November 19
- Location: Memorial Stadium
  Champaign, IL
- Game start: 11:02 a.m. CST
- Elapsed time: 2:56
- Game attendance: 39,031
- Game weather: 36°, Cloudy, Wind W 23 mph (37 km/h)
- Referee: Dan Capron
- TV announcers (BTN): Scott Graham, J Leman, Rick Pizzo
- Source: Box Score

Scoring summary
2	4:33	Iowa	Riley McCarron 55-yard punt return (Keith Duncan kick)	Iowa 7–0
3	7:51	Iowa	LeShun Daniels 1-yard run (Keith Duncan kick)	Iowa 14–0
4	7:17	Iowa	LeShun Daniels 50-yard run (Keith Duncan kick)	Iowa 21–0
4	4:41	Iowa	Akrum Wadley 2-yard run (Keith Duncan kick)	Iowa 28–0

Coming off an emotional win against Michigan, Iowa was slow out of the gates against the Illinois Fighting Illini. With Iowa heading in for a score, Akrum Wadley fumbled inside the Illini 5 to keep the game scoreless in the second quarter. However, Iowa would respond with a Riley McCarron 55-yard punt return touchdown for the only score of the first half and Iowa led 7–0 at the break. In the second half, Iowa dominated Illinois on the ground, as LeShun Daniels capped off a 12-play, 6 minute drive with a 1-yard touchdown run. Daniels would add a 50-yard touchdown run midway through the 4th and Iowa cruised to an easy 28–0 victory. The Iowa defense was phenomenal all game, allowing just 198 yards of total offense for the Illini, forcing two turnovers, and getting the team's first shutout since a 45–0 win over Ball State in 2010. Daniels rushed for a season-high 159 yards and two touchdowns. With the win, Iowa moved to 7–4, 5–3 Big Ten. Daniels was named Big Ten co-Offensive Player of the Week and McCarron co-Special Teams Player of the Week.

Statistics	IOWA	ILL
First downs	16	10
Total yards	342	198
Rushing yards	262	61
Passing yards	80	137
Turnovers	2	2
Time of possession	32:21	27:39

Team	Category	Player	Statistics
Iowa	Passing	C. J. Beathard	9/17, 80 yards, INT
Iowa	Rushing	LeShun Daniels	26 rushes, 159 yards, 2 TD
Iowa	Receiving	Noah Fant	3 receptions, 25 yards
Illinois	Passing	Wes Lunt	19/41, 137 yards, INT
Illinois	Rushing	K. Foster	16 rushes, 50 yards
Illinois	Receiving	Zach Grant	8 receptions, 65 yards

=== No. 17 Nebraska ===
Nebraska at Iowa
Heroes Trophy

Team	1	2	3	4	Total
No. 17 Cornhuskers	0	3	7	0	10
• Hawkeyes	13	7	6	14	40

- Date: November 25
- Location: Kinnick Stadium
  Iowa City, IA
- Game start: 2:45 p.m. CST
- Elapsed time: 3:31
- Game attendance: 69,814
- Game weather: 42°, Overcast, Wind W 10 mph (16 km/h)
- Referee: Jeff Servinski
- TV announcers (ABC): Allen Bestwick, Mike Bellotti, Kris Budden
- Source: Box Score

Scoring summary
1	4:55	Iowa	Akrum Wadley 75-yard run (Keith Duncan kick blocked)	Iowa 6–0
1	3:28	Iowa	Riley McCarron 77-yard pass from C.J. Beathard (Keith Duncan kick)	Iowa 13–0
2	9:57	Nebraska	Drew Brown 35-yard field goal	Iowa 13–3
2	7:49	Iowa	LeShun Daniels Jr. 4-yard run (Keith Duncan kick)	Iowa 20–3
3	12:40	Iowa	George Kittle 1-yard pass from C.J. Beathard (Two-point conversion failed)	Iowa 26–3
3	7:47	Nebraska	Stanley Morgan Jr. 13-yard pass from Tommy Armstrong Jr. (Drew Brown kick)	Iowa 26–10
4	11:13	Iowa	George Kittle 6-yard pass from C.J. Beathard (Keith Duncan kick)	Iowa 33–10
4	1:55	Iowa	LeShun Daniels Jr. 1-yard run (Keith Duncan kick)	Iowa 40–10

Iowa looked to end their season on a positive note with a win in the season finale against 16th ranked Nebraska. The Hawkeyes got explosive plays early as Akrum Wadley got the scoring started with a 75-yard touchdown run to put Iowa up 6–0. On the next offensive play for Iowa, C. J. Beathard found Riley McCarron for a 77-yard catch and run and Iowa was flying high, up 13–0 early. After a Drew Brown field goal, Iowa again got a big play as LeShun Daniels had a 56-yard run which set up a 4-yard touchdown by Daniels and Iowa led 20–3. In the second half, it was more of the same as Beathard found George Kittle for a 1-yard touchdown on the first drive of the second half and Iowa went up 26–3. Nebraska momentarily got back into the game when Stanley Morgan Jr. caught a 13-yard touchdown pass on 4th down from Tommy Armstrong Jr. to cut the Iowa lead to 26–10. But the running game for Iowa was too much for the Cornhuskers as the combination of Daniels and Wadley continued to wear down Nebraska. Beathard found Kittle for another score, and late in the game, Daniels added a 1-yard touchdown to put the finishing touches on a 40–10 dismantling of the rival Cornhuskers. The defense held Armstrong Jr. to 125 yards passing and gave up 217 total yards. Iowa ran for 264 yards and Beathard threw for 3 touchdowns as Iowa won its third consecutive game to end the season, including knocking off two straight ranked opponents at Kinnick Stadium. Iowa finished the 2016 regular season at 8–4, 6–3 in the Big Ten.

Statistics	NEB	IOWA
First downs	17	13
Total yards	217	408
Rushing yards	90	264
Passing yards	127	144
Turnovers	0	0
Time of possession	26:52	33:08

Team	Category	Player	Statistics
Nebraska	Passing	Tommy Armstrong Jr.	13/35, 125 yards, TD
Nebraska	Rushing	Tre Bryant	11 carries, 41
Nebraska	Receiving	Jordan Westerkamp	4 receptions, 50 yards
Iowa	Passing	C. J. Beathard	10/15, 144 yards, 3 TD
Iowa	Rushing	LeShun Daniels	29 carries, 158 yards, 2 TD
Iowa	Receiving	Riley McCarron	5 receptions, 108 yards, TD

=== vs. No. 20 Florida (Outback Bowl) ===
Florida vs. Iowa
Outback Bowl

Team	1	2	3	4	Total
• No. 20 Gators	3	7	7	13	30
No. 21 Hawkeyes	3	0	0	0	3

- Date: January 2
- Location: Raymond James Stadium
  Tampa, FL
- Game start: 1:00 p.m. EST
- Elapsed time: 3:30
- Game attendance: 51,119
- Game weather: 83 °F (28 °C), Sunny, Wind 10 mph (16 km/h)
- Referee: Brad Van Vark
- TV announcers (ABC): Mike Patrick (play-by-play), Ed Cunningham (analyst), Jerry Punch (sideline)
- Source: Box Score

Scoring summary
1	8:56	Iowa	Keith Duncan 36-yard field goal	Iowa 3–0
1	5:42	Florida	Eddy Piñeiro 44-yard field goal	Tied 3–3
2	1:46	Florida	Thompson 85-yard pass from Appleby (Piñeiro kick)	Florida 10–3
3	0:48	Florida	Goolsby 6-yard pass from Appleby (Piñeiro kick)	Florida 17–3
4	14:44	Florida	Gardner 58-yard INT return (Piñeiro kick)	Florida 24–3
4	9:46	Florida	Piñeiro 25-yard field goal	Florida 27–3
4	5:57	Florida	Piñeiro 48-yard field goal	Florida 30–3

Statistics	FLA	IOWA
First downs	11	14
Total yards	331	226
Rushing yards	109	171
Passing yards	222	55
Turnovers	2	3
Time of possession	28:45	31:15

Team	Category	Player	Statistics
Florida	Passing	Austin Appleby	14/25, 222 yards, 2 TD, 2 INT
Florida	Rushing	J. Scarlett	14 carries, 94 yards
Florida	Receiving	A. Callaway	7 receptions, 55 yards
Iowa	Passing	C. J. Beathard	7/23, 55 yards, 3 INT
Iowa	Rushing	Akrum Wadley	22 carries, 115 yards
Iowa	Receiving	Akrum Wadley	4 receptions, 21 yards

== Awards and honors ==
Weekly Awards
Player	Award	Date Awarded	Ref.
Anthony Nelson	Big Ten Freshman of the Week	September 5, 2016	
Ron Coluzzi	Big Ten Special Teams Player of the Week	September 24, 2016	
Jaleel Johnson	Big Ten Defensive Player of the Week	November 12, 2016	
Keith Duncan	Big Ten Special Teams Player of the Week	November 12, 2016	
Manny Rugamba	Co-Big Ten Freshman of the Week	November 12, 2016	
LeShun Daniels	Co-Big Ten Offensive Player of the Week	November 19, 2016	
Riley McCarron	Co-Big Ten Special Teams Player of the Week	November 19, 2016	

All-Conference Honors
Player	Position	Media Vote	Coaches Vote	AP
C. J. Beathard	QB	HM	–	–
LeShun Daniels	RB	HM	HM	–
Akrum Wadley	RB	HM	3rd Team	–
Sean Welsh	C	3rd Team	3rd Team	–
James Daniels	G	3rd Team	3rd Team	–
Riley McCarron	WR	HM	HM	–
Ike Boettger	OT	HM	HM	–
Cole Croston	OT	HM	3rd Team	–
George Kittle	TE	HM	HM	–
Nathan Bazata	DL	HM	–	–
Jaleel Johnson	DL	2nd Team	1st Team	1st Team
Parker Hesse	LB	HM	HM	–
Josey Jewell	LB	2nd Team	2nd Team	2nd Team
Desmond King	CB, RS	1st Team (CB); 2nd Team (RS)	1st Team (CB); 2nd Team (RS)	1st Team
Greg Mabin	CB	–	HM	–
Ron Coluzzi	P	3rd Team	3rd Team	–

=== Postseason awards ===
- Offensive line – Joe Moore Award

== Players in the 2017 NFL draft ==
Player	Position	Round	Pick	NFL club	Ref
C. J. Beathard	QB	3	104	San Francisco 49ers	
Jaleel Johnson	DT	4	109	Minnesota Vikings	
George Kittle	TE	5	146	San Francisco 49ers	
Desmond King	CB	5	151	Los Angeles Chargers	
