= McCarran =

McCarran may refer to:

== Places ==
- McCarran Field (disambiguation), airports formerly named after Senator Pat McCarran

== People ==
- Pat McCarran (1876–1954), US Senator from Nevada

== See also ==
- McCarran Internal Security Act, 1950 U.S. law against Communists
- McCarran-Ferguson Act, U.S. law in 1945 affecting insurance
- McCarran Immigration Act, 1952 US law
- McCarran Committee, created 1950 to deal with internal security
- McCarran Amendment, 1952 U.S. law on water rights
- McCarren Park, in Brooklyn, New York
- McCarren (disambiguation)
