= C. J. Beathard =

American football player (born 1993)

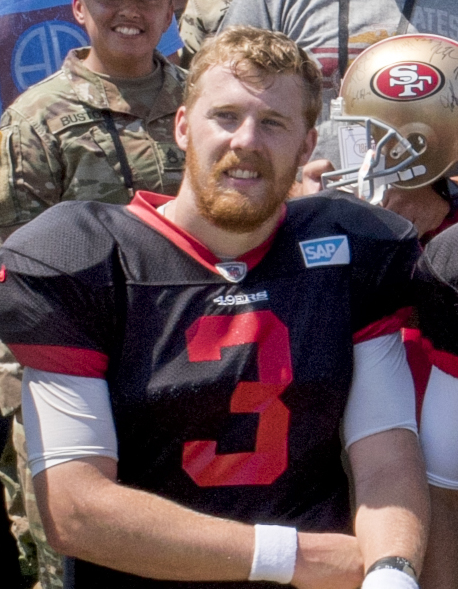
- Beathard with the San Francisco 49ers in 2018

Profile
- Position: Quarterback

Personal information
- Born: November 16, 1993 (age 33); Nashville, Tennessee, U.S.
- Listed height: 6 ft 2 in (1.88 m)
- Listed weight: 215 lb (98 kg)

Career information
- High school: Battle Ground Academy (Franklin, Tennessee)
- College: Iowa (2012–2016)
- NFL draft: 2017: 3rd round, 104th overall pick

Career history
- San Francisco 49ers (2017–2020); Jacksonville Jaguars (2021–2023); Miami Dolphins (2024)*; Jacksonville Jaguars (2024); Detroit Lions (2025)*
- * Offseason or practice squad member only

Awards and highlights
- Second-team All-Big Ten (2015)

Career NFL statistics as of 2025
- Passing attempts: 563
- Passing completions: 340
- Completion percentage: 60.4%
- TD–INT: 19–14
- Passing yards: 3,886
- Passer rating: 82.1
- Stats at Pro Football Reference

Casey Jarrett Beathard (/ˈbɛθərd/ BETH-ərd; born November 16, 1993) is an American professional football quarterback. He played college football for the Iowa Hawkeyes and was selected by the San Francisco 49ers in the third round of the 2017 NFL draft. Beathard has also been a member of the Jacksonville Jaguars and Miami Dolphins.

== Early life ==
Beathard attended Battle Ground Academy in Franklin, Tennessee. He played high school football for the Battle Ground Academy Wildcats. After his high school football career, Beathard committed to the University of Iowa to play college football.

== College career ==
=== 2012 season ===
Beathard redshirted during his freshman year at Iowa.

=== 2013 season ===
In the 2013 season, Beathard appeared in a limited role in five games for the Hawkeyes. On September 21, he made his collegiate debut against the Western Michigan Broncos, where he had a 54-yard completion and four carries for 30 yards. On November 9 against the Purdue Boilermakers, Beathard scored his first career collegiate touchdown on a five-yard rush. Beathard added another rushing touchdown in his next appearance against the Nebraska Cornhuskers on a four-yard rush. In the Outback Bowl against the LSU Tigers, Beathard threw a touchdown pass to teammate Kevonte Martin-Manley in the fourth quarter of the 21–14 loss.

Beathard finished the 2013 season with 179 passing yards, a touchdown, and two interceptions to go along with 13 carries for 49 yards and two touchdowns.

=== 2014 season ===
Beathard continued his role as a backup in the 2014 season. In the first half against the Pittsburgh Panthers, starter Jake Rudock suffered a minor injury and Beathard took the field to begin the second half, with the Hawkeyes trailing 17–7. While Pitt had been dominant throughout much of the first half, the team gained a new energy in the second half with Beathard under center. Beathard would take the Hawkeyes to a 24–20 victory.

After a last-minute loss to non-conference in-state rival Iowa State Cyclones, who would eventually go 2–10 (winless in conference play), fans in the community were vocal with their criticisms of the Iowa coaching staff, citing the conservative play calling, unused potential of players, and the apparent apathy of head coach Kirk Ferentz. Ferentz was in his 16th year of coaching the Hawkeyes, and his contract as head coach was guaranteed until 2020, an extension offered after their 2010 Orange Bowl victory against the Georgia Tech Yellow Jackets when the Hawkeyes finished their season 11–2. Iowa fans were impressed by Beathard's energy against Pitt, and his comeback victory sparked debate about his position as a starter.

Beathard started the following game against the Purdue Boilermakers, where Iowa won 24–10. Following their bye week, Rudock was declared healthy by Ferentz, and returned as a starter against the Indiana Hoosiers, where they won 45–29. Fan criticism of the program continued throughout the season, as the team continued to lose against the better part of their schedule.

The criticism, informally called the "Iowa quarterback controversy", revolved primarily around Beathard being the deserving man of the starting spot, while some fervent fans called for the firing of Ferentz. The public criticism of the coaching staff was so strong that Iowa athletic director [Gary Barta] spoke publicly on multiple occasions in support of Ferentz in regards to the issue.

With Rudock at the helm for the remainder of the season, Iowa would go on to defeat the Northwestern Wildcats by a surprisingly large margin in a 48–7 home victory but was defeated in an equally grand way at the Minnesota Golden Gophers the following week, losing 51–14. The Wisconsin Badgers and the Nebraska Cornhuskers, conference rivals and two of the toughest games on Iowa's 2014 schedule, came to Kinnick Stadium in the final two games of the regular season. Wisconsin, with Heisman runner-up halfback Melvin Gordon, avoided an upset and defeated Iowa 26–24; the Hawkeyes came up short against Nebraska as well, losing in overtime, 37–34, after blowing a 17-point lead.

Iowa received a bid to the TaxSlayer Bowl against the Tennessee Volunteers, and pressure from fans and the media left the Iowa coaching staff uncertain and the need to make a solid decision. Beathard's father, Casey Beathard, made statements to The Tennessean, a local Tennessee media outlet, stating that his future would be evaluated after the game, and that "he's hoping he doesn't have to transfer". Though taken out of context by media, Beathard Sr. affirmed that it was not a threat of transfer; regardless, Ferentz made an announcement shortly before gameday stating that both quarterbacks would take snaps during the game, hinting at an on-field competition for the spot.

Both Rudock and Beathard took snaps during the TaxSlayer Bowl, and the Hawkeyes lost 45–28 to Tennessee. The Volunteers got off to a large start; both Rudock and Beathard had poor drives during the first half, but Beathard handled the majority of second-half snaps. Beathard was able to rally the Hawkeyes from a 35–7 first-half deficit, though they were not able to win the game.

Shortly after the TaxSlayer Bowl loss, Kirk Ferentz released a depth chart for the following 2015 season — a very irregular time for a coach to do so — which named Beathard the starting quarterback for the 2015 season. Rudock, who in 2014 was a senior and preparing to graduate, had been being recruited by new Michigan coach Jim Harbaugh; and, after Beathard was officially named next season's starter, Rudock transferred to the University of Michigan for graduate study and for his one year of graduate eligibility.

=== 2015 season ===
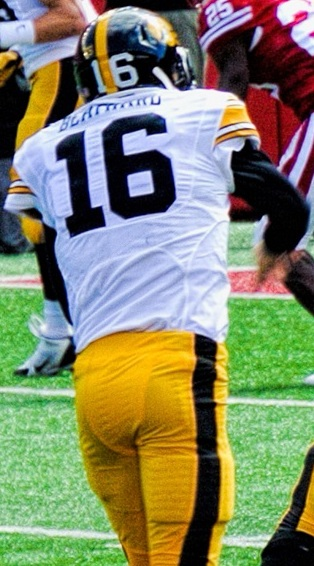
Beathard in 2015

Beathard helped lead the 2015 Iowa Hawkeyes football team to an undefeated 12–0 record during the regular season, as he threw for 2,570 yards, 14 touchdowns, and three interceptions. He was selected by both the coaches and media as a second-team player on the 2015 All-Big Ten Conference football team. The Hawkeyes' winning streak ended in the 16–13 loss to the Michigan State Spartans in the Big Ten Championship. Beathard passed for 216 yards, a touchdown, and an interception in the loss. During the Rose Bowl against the Stanford Cardinal, Beathard threw for 239 yards, two touchdowns, and an interception in the 45–16 loss.

=== 2016 season ===
In his final season with the Hawkeyes, Beathard helped lead the team to an 8–4 record in the regular season. The team qualified for the Outback Bowl against the Florida Gators. The Gators won by a score of 30–3 in Beathard's final collegiate game. Overall, in the 2016 season, Beathard had 1,929 passing yards, 17 touchdowns, and 10 interceptions to go along with two rushing touchdowns.

== Professional career ==
=== Pre-draft ===
Beathard played in the 2017 Senior Bowl for the North team, and was limited to two passes for 4 passing yards as the North lost 15–16 to the South. He attended the NFL Combine and performed the vertical jump, broad jump, and positional drills. Due to a hamstring injury, he opted to skip the 40-yard dash, short shuttle, and three-cone drill. On March 27, 2017, Beathard participated at Iowa's pro day along with Desmond King, Jaleel Johnson, George Kittle, Riley McCarron, LeShun Daniels Jr., Cole Croston, Faith Ekakitie, Anthony Gair, Jake Duzey and Ron Coluzzi. He performed the short shuttle, three-cone drill, vertical jump, broad jump, and passing drills for the team representatives and scouts who attended from all 32 NFL teams. At the conclusion of the pre-draft process, Beathard was projected to be a sixth- or seventh-round pick by NFL draft experts and scouts.

Pre-draft measurables
Height	Weight	Arm length	Hand span	20-yard shuttle	Three-cone drill	Vertical jump	Broad jump	Wonderlic
6 ft 2 1/2 in (1.89 m)	219 lb (99 kg)	30 5/8 in (0.78 m)	9 3/8 in (0.24 m)	4.23 s	6.95 s	34.5 in (0.88 m)	9 ft 5 in (2.87 m)	26
All values from NFL Combine/Iowa's Pro Day

=== San Francisco 49ers ===
==== 2017 season ====
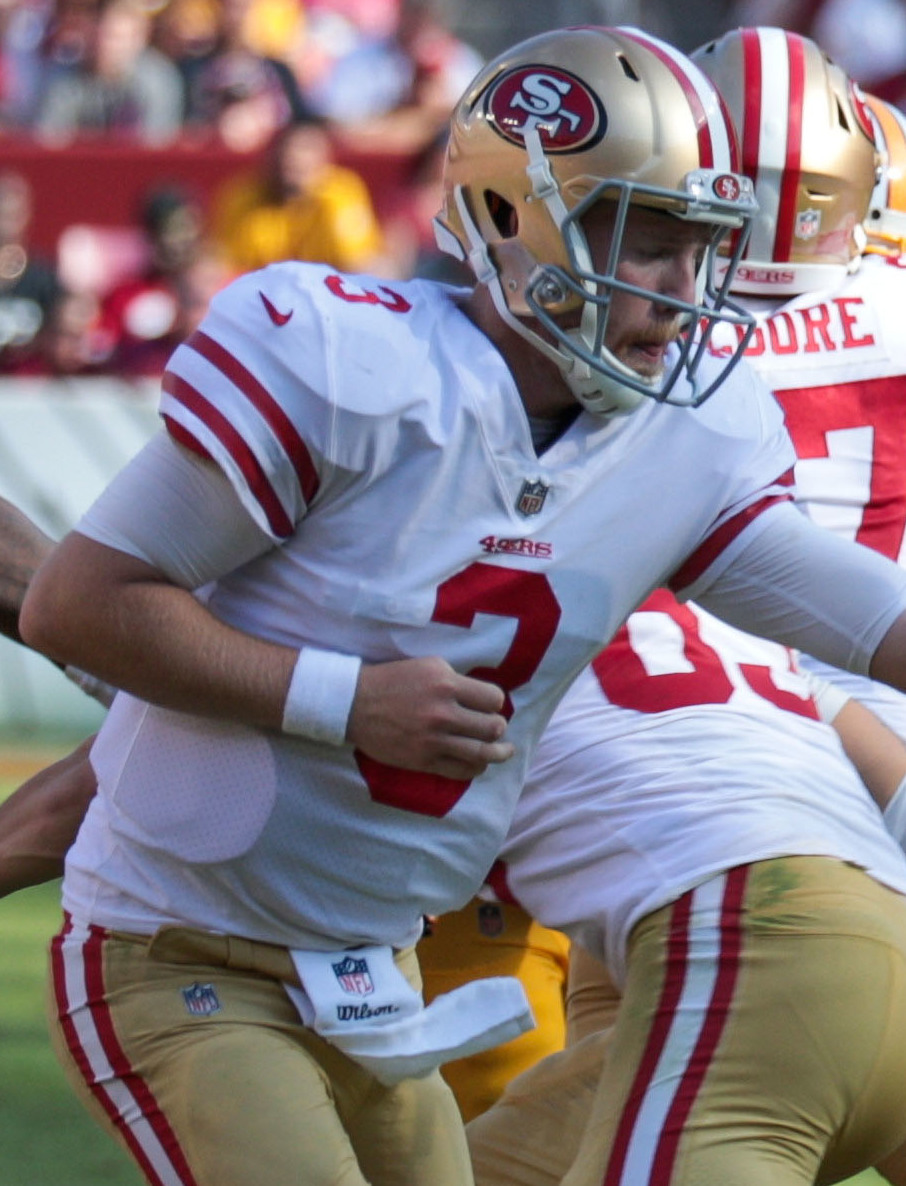
Beathard in 2017

The San Francisco 49ers selected Beathard in the third round (104th overall) of the 2017 NFL draft. He was the sixth quarterback to be selected that year. On June 12, 2017, Beathard signed his rookie contract, a four-year, $3.52 million with a signing bonus of $706,288. Beathard competed with Matt Barkley and Nick Mullens throughout training camp for the job as the backup quarterback. Head coach Kyle Shanahan named him the backup to Brian Hoyer to begin the regular season after Barkley was released.

During Week 6, Beathard made his NFL debut against the Washington Redskins, replacing Hoyer in the second quarter. He played for the rest of the game. In the fourth quarter, he threw his first NFL touchdown, a 45-yard pass to wide receiver Aldrick Robinson. Beathard finished the narrow 26–24 loss completing 19 of 36 passes for 245 yards, a touchdown, and an interception. After the game, he was named the 49ers starter. During a Week 7 40–10 blowout loss to the Dallas Cowboys, Beathard was 22-of-38 for 235 yards and had five carries for 30 yards and his first rushing touchdown. In Weeks 8 and 9, Beathard passed for 461 yards, a touchdown, and three interceptions while also rushing for 56 yards and a touchdown against the Philadelphia Eagles and Arizona Cardinals.

The 49ers won their first game of the season in Week 10 over the New York Giants. During the 31–21 victory, Beathard completed 19 of 25 passes for 288 yards, two touchdowns, and an interception while also rushing for 15 yards and a touchdown. One of the touchdowns was for the longest play of his career, an 83-yard pass to wide receiver Marquise Goodwin. In the next game against the Seattle Seahawks, Beathard suffered a leg and hip injury at the end of the fourth quarter and was replaced by recent trade acquisition Jimmy Garoppolo. Although he avoided any serious injury, it was Beathard's final appearance for the 49ers in the 2017 season as Garoppolo was promoted to be the starter a few days later.

Beathard finished his rookie season completing 123-of-224 passes (54.9%) for 1,430 yards, four touchdowns, and six interceptions to go along with 26 carries for 136 yards and three touchdowns in seven games and five starts. Several members of the 49ers have publicly complimented the attitude and toughness of Beathard during the season, as he was sacked 19 times in his seven appearances.

==== 2018 season ====
In 2018, the plan was for Beathard to be the backup to Garoppolo. However, Garoppolo tore his ACL in Week 3 against the Kansas City Chiefs, making Beathard the starter. During a narrow Week 4 29–27 loss to the Los Angeles Chargers, Beathard connected with fellow Hawkeye alum tight-end George Kittle for an 82-yard touchdown. Beathard finished the game with 298 passing yards, two touchdowns, and two interceptions and also rushed for 19 yards. The following week against the Cardinals, he had a career-high 349 passing yards, two touchdowns, and two interceptions while also rushing for seven yards and a touchdown. Three weeks later against the Cardinals, Beathard suffered a wrist injury. Nick Mullens started the next game against the Oakland Raiders in Beathard's place. He did not appear in any other games in the 2018 season.

Beathard finished his second professional season with 1,252 passing yards, eight touchdowns, and seven interceptions to go along with 19 carries for 69 yards and a touchdown.

==== 2019 season ====
With Jimmy Garoppolo returning from injury and Nick Mullens as the primary backup quarterback, Beathard saw no playing time in the 2019 season.

==== 2020 season ====
During Week 4 against the Eagles, Beathard came into the game after Nick Mullens was benched and finished going 14 of 19 for 138 yards in the 25–20 loss. In the next game against the Miami Dolphins, he relieved starting quarterback Jimmy Garoppolo during the second half after Garoppolo reinjured his ankle. Beathard finished the 43–17 loss with 94 passing yards and a touchdown. During Week 15 against the Dallas Cowboys, Beathard entered the game after Mullens injured his elbow in the fourth quarter. Beathard threw for 100 yards, including a 49-yard touchdown to Kendrick Bourne in the 41–33 road loss.

On December 22, 2020, Beathard was named the starter for the 49ers' Week 16 matchup against the Arizona Cardinals due to Mullens' injury. He finished the 20–12 road victory with 182 passing yards and three touchdowns. It was Beathard's second winning game in the NFL.

=== Jacksonville Jaguars (first stint) ===
On March 24, 2021, Beathard signed a two-year, $5 million deal with the Jacksonville Jaguars.

On February 24, 2023, Beathard signed a contract extension with the Jaguars.

On December 4, 2023, Beathard took over in the fourth quarter against the Cincinnati Bengals after starter Trevor Lawrence injured his ankle. He led the Jaguars down the field with less than 2:30 left in the fourth quarter, leading to a game-tying 40-yard field goal with 26 seconds left. In overtime, the Jaguars won the coin toss and chose to receive the ball, but were unable to get past their side of midfield and had to punt. The Bengals later kicked the game-winning field goal, winning 34–31 in overtime.

On August 27, 2024, Beathard was released on an injury settlement by the Jaguars as part of final roster cuts.

=== Miami Dolphins ===
On October 22, 2024, due to injuries to starter Tua Tagovailoa, as well as backups Skylar Thompson and Tyler Huntley, the Miami Dolphins signed Beathard to their practice squad.

=== Jacksonville Jaguars (second stint) ===
On November 6, 2024, Beathard was signed by the Jaguars off of the Dolphins' practice squad.

=== Detroit Lions ===
On September 4, 2025, Beathard signed with the Detroit Lions' practice squad.

== Career statistics ==
=== NFL ===
Year	Team	Games			Passing									Rushing					Sacks		Fumbles	
Year	Team	GP	GS	Record	Cmp	Att	Pct	Yds	Y/A	Lng	TD	Int	Rtg	Att	Yds	Avg	Lng	TD	Sck	SckY	Fum	Lost
2017	SF	7	5	1–4	123	224	54.9	1,430	6.4	83	4	6	69.2	26	136	5.2	16	3	19	141	3	2
2018	SF	6	5	0–5	102	169	60.4	1,252	7.4	82	8	7	81.8	19	69	3.6	13	1	18	156	5	3
2019	SF	0	0	—	DNP																	
2020	SF	6	2	1–1	66	104	63.5	787	7.6	49	6	0	105.7	6	28	4.7	17	0	9	71	3	3
2021	JAX	2	0	—	2	2	100.0	33	16.5	28	0	0	118.8	1	2	2.0	2	0	0	0	0	0
2022	JAX	4	0	—	7	11	63.6	35	3.2	11	0	1	30.5	4	−4	−1.0	−1	0	1	5	0	0
2023	JAX	7	1	1–0	40	53	75.5	349	6.6	48	1	0	98.7	8	35	4.4	19	0	6	27	1	0
Career		32	13	3–10	340	563	60.4	3,886	6.9	83	19	14	82.1	64	266	4.2	19	4	53	400	12	8

=== College ===
Year	Team	Games			Passing							Rushing			
Year	Team	GP	GS	Record	Comp	Att	Yards	Pct	TD	Int	Rtg	Att	Yds	Avg	TD
2012	Iowa	Redshirt													
2013	Iowa	5	0	0–0	9	27	179	33.3	1	2	86.4	13	49	3.8	2
2014	Iowa	8	1	1–0	52	92	645	56.5	5	2	129.0	28	156	5.6	0
2015	Iowa	14	14	12–2	223	362	2,809	61.6	17	5	139.5	100	237	2.4	6
2016	Iowa	13	13	8–5	170	301	1,929	56.5	17	10	122.3	83	−14	−0.2	2
Career		40	28	21–7	447	759	5,507	58.9	40	19	129.8	224	429	1.9	10

== Personal life ==
Beathard is the son of country music songwriter Casey Beathard, the brother of country music singer Tucker Beathard, the grandson of former NFL executive Bobby Beathard, who was a Pro Football Hall of Famer and the great-nephew of former NFL quarterback Pete Beathard.

On December 21, 2019, Beathard's younger brother, Clay, the starting quarterback for the LIU Sharks, was fatally stabbed outside of a bar in Nashville, Tennessee.
