= Maccarone =

Maccarone may refer to people with the surname Maccarone:

- Angelina Maccarone (born 1965), German film director. screenwriter and professor
- Giordano Maccarone (born 1990), Italian footballer
- Juan Carlos Maccarone (1940–2015), Argentine Roman Catholic bishop
- Massimo Maccarone (born 1979), Italian footballer
- Sam Maccarone (born 1975), American film actor, director and writer
- Grace Maccarone, children's book editor and author
- Gustavo Maccarone (born 1987), Brazilian offensive midfielder
- Sal Maccarone (born 1949), American kinetic sculptor

== See also ==
- Maccarone (art gallery), a New York art gallery
- McCarron
