= LeShun Daniels Sr. =

American football player (born 1974)

No. 69, 78
- Position: Offensive tackle / guard

Personal information
- Born: May 30, 1974 (age 52); Warren, Ohio, U.S.
- Listed height: 6 ft 1 in (1.85 m)
- Listed weight: 304 lb (138 kg)

Career information
- High school: Warren G. Harding (Warren, Ohio)
- College: Ohio State (1992–1996)
- NFL draft: 1997: undrafted

Career history
- Minnesota Vikings (1997); Amsterdam Admirals (1999)*; Rhein Fire (2001); Jacksonville Jaguars (2001)*
- * Offseason or practice squad member only

Awards and highlights
- Second-team All-Big Ten (1995)

Career NFL statistics
- Games played: 1
- Stats at Pro Football Reference

LeShun Darnell Daniels Sr. (born May 30, 1974) is an American former professional football player who was an offensive lineman in the National Football League (NFL) for the Minnesota Vikings. He played college football for the Ohio State Buckeyes and was selected second-team All-Big Ten Conference in 1995. After going unselected in the 1997 NFL draft, Daniels signed with the Vikings and appeared in one game for them that year. He later was a member of the Amsterdam Admirals and Rhein Fire in NFL Europe and the Jacksonville Jaguars in the NFL.

== Personal life ==
Daniels was born on May 30, 1974, in Warren, Ohio. Growing up, he was best friends with Korey Stringer, and the two played together in junior high school, high school, college, and the NFL; Stringer died in 2001 from heat stroke. Daniels attended Western Reserve High School and then Warren G. Harding High School after a merger with Western Reserve. In high school, Daniels played football as a defensive tackle, helping Warren G. Harding to the state championship in 1990 while posting 37 tackles and 10 tackles-for-loss. After his senior year, Daniels and Stringer both committed to play college football for the Ohio State Buckeyes.

Daniels and his wife, Alicia, have two sons: LeShun Jr. and James, both of whom later played in the NFL. After his football career, he lived in Chaska, Minnesota, before moving to DeKalb, Illinois. He later moved back to his hometown of Warren, Ohio.

== College career ==
Daniels redshirted as a freshman at Ohio State University in 1992. In 1993, he changed positions and became the team's backup right guard. He won a starting role in 1994, helping the Buckeyes to a 9–4 record with a Citrus Bowl appearance that year. The following year, Daniels was named second-team All-Big Ten Conference while Ohio State compiled a record of 11–2 and played in the 1996 Florida Citrus Bowl. In his last year in college, 1996, he helped Ohio State to a record of 11–1 with a shared Big Ten title. During his college career, he played alongside future Pro Football Hall of Famer Orlando Pace on the offensive line.

== Professional career ==
After going unselected in the 1997 NFL draft, Daniels signed with the Minnesota Vikings as an offensive guard. He had been suggested to the Vikings by Korey Stringer and impressed the team during training camp and preseason. He was waived by the Vikings on August 24, 1996, but re-signed to the practice squad two days later. On November 13, he was promoted to the active roster. After a mid-game injury to center Everett Lindsay, Daniels made his NFL debut at center in the team's Week 17 game against the Indianapolis Colts, a 39–28 win. He did not appear in any other games that year for the Vikings, as the team went 9–7 and lost in the divisional round of the playoffs. He was released by the Vikings on August 24, 1998.

Daniels was drafted by the Amsterdam Admirals of NFL Europe in 1999, but did not play in any games for them. Two years later, he signed with the Rhein Fire and appeared in 10 games, all as a starter, at offensive tackle, as the team compiled a record of 5–5. Following the NFL Europe season, he returned to the NFL and signed with the Jacksonville Jaguars on July 3, 2001, although he was released on September 2. The Jaguars were the last team of his career, and he finished with one NFL game played.
