= 2017 Outback Bowl =

- 31st Outback Bowl
Florida Gators	Iowa Hawkeyes
(8–4)	(8–4)
SEC	Big Ten
30	3
Head coach: Jim McElwain	Head coach: Kirk Ferentz
AP / Coaches / CFP; 20 / 18 / 17	AP / Coaches; 21 / 25
	1	2	3	4	Total
Florida	3	7	7	13	30
Iowa	3	0	0	0	3
- Date: January 2, 2017
- Season: 2016
- Stadium: Raymond James Stadium
- Location: Tampa, Florida
- MVP: Chauncey Gardner
- Favorite: Florida by 1
- Referee: Brad Van Vark (Big 12)
- Attendance: 51,119
- Payout: US$3,500,000

United States TV coverage
- Network: ABC
- Announcers: Mike Patrick (play-by-play); Ed Cunningham (analyst); Jerry Punch (sidelines)

The 2017 Outback Bowl was an American college football bowl game played on Monday, January 2, 2017, at Raymond James Stadium in Tampa, Florida. The 31st annual Outback Bowl featured the Iowa Hawkeyes from the Big Ten Conference and the Florida Gators from the Southeastern Conference, and was one of the 2016–17 NCAA football bowl games concluding the 2016 NCAA Division I FBS football season. The game was nationally televised by ABC, and its title sponsor was the Outback Steakhouse restaurant franchise.

== Teams ==
On December 4, 2016, Florida and Iowa were selected to play one another. This was the fourth overall meeting between the teams, and was the third time the Gators and Hawkeyes played each other in the Outback Bowl, with each team having won one of the previous meetings. This was also the fifth time each school played in the Outback Bowl.

== Game summary ==
=== Scoring summary ===
Scoring summary

Quarter	Time	Drive			Team	Scoring information	Score	
Quarter	Time	Plays	Yards	TOP	Team	Scoring information	FLA	IOWA
1	8:56	5	9	1:25	IOWA	36-yard field goal by Keith Duncan	0	3
1	5:42	8	49	3:14	FLA	44-yard field goal by Eddy Piñeiro	3	3
2	1:46	1	85	0:16	FLA	Mark Thompson 85-yard touchdown reception from Austin Appleby, Eddy Piñeiro kick good	10	3
3	0:48	12	80	6:47	FLA	DeAndre Goolsby 6-yard touchdown reception from Austin Appleby, Eddy Piñeiro kick good	17	3
4	14:44				FLA	Interception returned 58 yards for touchdown by Chauncey Gardner, Eddy Piñeiro kick good	24	3
4	9:46	4	-1	1:25	FLA	25-yard field goal by Eddy Piñeiro	27	3
4	5:57	4	6	1:39	FLA	48-yard field goal by Eddy Piñeiro	30	3
"TOP" = time of possession. For other American football terms, see Glossary of American football.							30	3

=== Statistics ===
Statistics	FLA	IOWA
First downs	11	14
Plays-yards	57–331	65–226
Third down efficiency	6/15	4/15
Rushes-yards	109	171
Passing yards	222	55
Passing, Comp-Att-Int	14–25–2	7–24–3
Time of Possession	28:45	31:15

Team	Category	Player	Statistics
FLA	Passing	Austin Appleby	14/25, 2 int., 222 yds, 2 TD
FLA	Rushing	Jordan Scarlett	14 r./94 yds, 0 TD
FLA	Receiving	Antonio Callaway	7 rec./55 yds, 0 TD
IOWA	Passing	C. J. Beathard	7/23, 3 int., 55 yds, 0 TD
IOWA	Rushing	Akrum Wadley	22 r./115 yds, 0 TD
IOWA	Receiving	Akrum Wadley	4 rec./21 yds, 0 TD
