= McCarran Field =

McCarran Field may refer to:

- Harry Reid International Airport, the former Alamo Airport named for Senator Pat McCarran from 1948 to 2021
- Nellis Air Force Base, a 1929 airport that was named McCarran Field prior to World War II
