= Joe McCarron =

Irish radio DJ and political candidate (1954–2021)

- Born: 1954
- Died: 24 September 2021 (aged 67); Letterkenny University Hospital, Donegal, Ireland
- Occupation: DJ

Joe McCarron was a radio DJ and electoral candidate from Dungloe, County Donegal, Ireland.

== Early life ==
He was born in 1954.

== Politics ==
He was a former electoral candidate with Direct Democracy Ireland.

== Death ==
=== Hospitalisation ===
He had been hospitalised after contracting COVID-19.

=== Removal from hospital ===
On 14 September 2021, Antonio Mureddu Gravegliu entered Letterkenny University Hospital and was videoed talking to McCarron, saying "If you stay here, they're going to f**king kill you." The video also shows Mureddu telling McCarron that he is coming home and that he is safe. A doctor then said to McCarron "What he's doing is wrong!" and "He's endangering your life". The doctor added "It's a very difficult disease that you have, and I'm not lying to you, you could die, but this could be your best chance in the hospital."

Mureddu then said to McCarron "If you stay here, they're going to f**king kill you.” and "It's better if he dies in the house than if he dies in here..". McCarron then left with Mureddu.

Mureddu is a member of the Freeman on the land movement.

On 16 September 2021 McCarron was brought back by ambulance to the Intensive care unit. He was put on a ventilator but his condition worsened. On 24 September he died from COVID-19.

Hospital staff had reported other incidents involving anti-vaccine protestors - at least three where staff had been shouted at and followed by them outside the hospital as well as having been filmed inside the hospital performing their duties.

His wife Una and the rest of the family asked people wishing to sympathise with the family not to call because of concerns over COVID-19.

=== Funeral ===
His funeral was held in St. Crona's church in Dungloe. During the funeral service at least five people were asked to leave because they were not wearing facemasks in line with Government regulations. Gardaí were called and later made a statement that "Gardaí received report of a number of people inside a church not wearing face coverings in Dungloe, Co Donegal on the 26th September 2021. Gardaí attended and provided advice to those present. No offences disclosed. Enquiries ongoing." The spokesman also said that Gardaí were not compliance officers with regard to regulations under the Health Act requiring the wearing of face coverings at certain indoor gatherings.

He was buried in Maghery cemetery.

=== Reactions to hospital incident ===
A spokesman for the McCarron family said that Joe's wife Una wanted to apologise to hospital staff for what had happened. He said that "Una would like to thank the staff and apologise for the actions of Joe's so-called reckless friends earlier in the week. They did not help Joe's recovery in any way. We would encourage everyone to follow proper medical advice."

Staff members at Letterkenny University Hospital contacted the Irish Nurses and Midwives Organisation (INMO) about incidents at the hospital, including the removal of Joe McCarron, and the organisation asked the hospital to review security. The general secretary of INMO, Phil Ní Sheaghdha, called for better security in hospitals because of increases in abuse and assaults. She said that the incident involving Joe McCarron highlighted issues healthcare workers had to deal with. She said "I really think that the issue for us right now is ... security to ensure that that incident that happened in Letterkenny is not repeated". She said hospital staff were "busy enough" and didn't need to deal with misinformation and "that type of behaviour towards very sick and vulnerable people". She also said "Security has to be reviewed in all settings."

Taoiseach Micheál Martin said that "If you get it (COVID-19), you should treat it as very serious. Certainly, it is outrageous that anyone would, in an ill-informed way, be advising people to leave hospital. It endangers that person's health."

Pádraig Mac Lochlainn condemned the protestors who took McCarron with them as "deeply disturbing and outrageous". He also said "Our nurses and doctors in Letterkenny University Hospital and our hospitals across the State have been in the business of saving lives throughout this crisis, Nobody should impede them while they are saving lives. I believe that these types of individuals should not be allowed on the hospital campuses."

Former Justice Minister Alan Shatter said "My condolences to the family of Joe McCarron who died yesterday in Letterkenny Hospital. The Gardaí should clarify whether his being wrongly encouraged by third parties, contrary to medical advice, to leave the hospital earlier this month is the subject of a Garda investigation."

Saolta Hospital Group expressed "grave concern" about the effect on staff and patients.

==== Garda investigation ====
Gardaí appointed a senior investigating officer to investigate incidents at Letterkenny University Hospital involving COVID-19 denying activists, including the incident that led to MacCarron's death.

In November 2021 it was revealed that investigators had been told that McCarron had been given veterinary Ivermectin to treat his COVID-19 infection. They are suspect it was delivered to his home after he was removed from hospital and it was taken from the house after his death.

On 28 November 2021 it was announced that Gardaí were recommending that charges be brought against Antonio Mureddu in relation to the removal of Joe McCarron from the hospital. The investigation was reported to be "near completion" and Gardaí in County Donegal would send a file to the Director of Public Prosecutions recommending that Mr Mureddu be charged.

On 1 May 2022 it was announced that the Director of Public Prosecutions had directed the Gardaí to not prosecute a 44 year old anti-vaccine campaigner. He had been arrested on 7 February 2022 in relation to the incident after appearing at Letterkenny District Court on road traffic charges.
