= LeShun Daniels Jr. =

American football player (born 1995)

LeShun Daniels
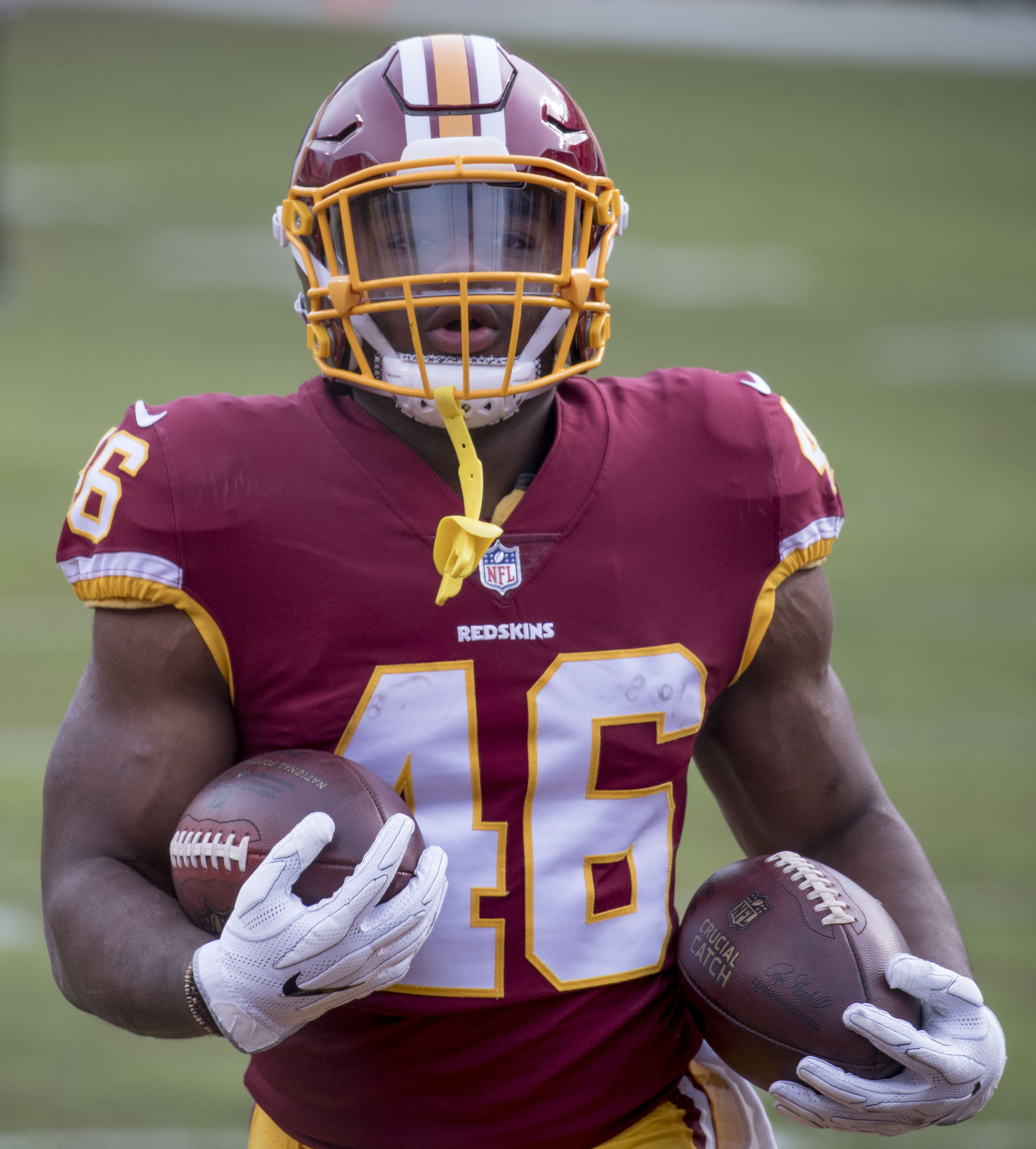
- Daniels with the Washington Redskins in 2017

No. 46
- Position: Running back

Personal information
- Born: June 4, 1995 (age 31); Warren, Ohio, U.S.
- Listed height: 5 ft 11 in (1.80 m)
- Listed weight: 225 lb (102 kg)

Career information
- High school: Warren G. Harding (Warren, Ohio)
- College: Iowa
- NFL draft: 2017: undrafted

Career history
- New England Patriots (2017)*; Los Angeles Chargers (2017)*; Washington Redskins (2017); Green Bay Packers (2018)*
- * Offseason or practice squad member only

Career NFL statistics
- Rushing attempts: 3
- Rushing yards: 14
- Rushing average: 4.7
- Stats at Pro Football Reference

LeShun Darnell Daniels Jr. (born June 4, 1995) is an American former professional football player who was a running back in the National Football League (NFL). He played college football for the Iowa Hawkeyes. He signed with the New England Patriots as an undrafted free agent in 2017 and was also a member of the Los Angeles Chargers, Washington Redskins, and Green Bay Packers.

== Personal life ==
LeShun Daniels Jr. was born June 4, 1995, in Warren, Ohio. He attended Warren G. Harding High School.

Daniels is the older brother of offensive lineman James Daniels, who was his teammate at the University of Iowa, and was selected by the Chicago Bears in the 2018 NFL draft. His father LeShun Daniels Sr. was an offensive lineman with Ohio State from 1992 to 1996, and for the Minnesota Vikings in 1997.

== College career ==
During his senior year, Daniels was voted team captain and was named the team's MVP. He posted 1,058 rushing yards on 213 attempts while scoring 10 rushing touchdowns.

=== College statistics ===
Year	Team	G	Rushing				Receiving			
Year	Team	G	Att	Yards	Avg	TD	Rec	Yards	Avg	TD
2013	Iowa	7	36	142	3.9	0	0	0	0.0	0
2014	Iowa	5	15	49	3.3	1	1	5	5.0	0
2015	Iowa	12	145	646	4.5	8	1	9	9.0	0
2016	Iowa	13	213	1,058	5.0	10	8	67	8.4	0
Career		37	409	1,895	4.6	19	10	81	8.1	0

== Professional career ==
Pre-draft measurables
Height	Weight	Arm length	Hand span	40-yard dash	10-yard split	20-yard split	20-yard shuttle	Three-cone drill	Vertical jump	Broad jump	Bench press
5 ft 10 7/8 in (1.80 m)	222 lb (101 kg)	30 5/8 in (0.78 m)	9 1/2 in (0.24 m)	4.57 s	1.61 s	2.64 s	4.45 s	7.28 s	36.0 in (0.91 m)	9 ft 6 in (2.90 m)	21 reps
All values from Pro Day

Daniels signed with the New England Patriots as an undrafted free agent on May 5, 2017. He was waived by the Patriots on September 2, 2017.

On October 4, 2017, Daniels was signed to the Los Angeles Chargers' practice squad. He was released on October 16, 2017.

On November 15, 2017, Daniels was signed by the Washington Redskins' practice squad. He was promoted to the active roster on November 21, 2017. He was placed on injured reserve on December 23, 2017. On March 29, 2018, the Redskins waived Daniels.

On August 18, 2018, Daniels was signed by the Green Bay Packers. He was waived on September 1, 2018.
