= McCarrons Lake =

Lake in the state of Minnesota, United States

- Location within Minnesota
- Location: Ramsey County, Minnesota
- Coordinates: 44°59′54″N 93°6′48″W
- Type: lake

McCarrons Lake is a lake in Ramsey County, in the U.S. state of Minnesota.

McCarrons Lake was named after John E. McCarron, a pioneer who settled near the lake.

== See also ==
- List of lakes in Minnesota
