= Gustavo Maccarone =

Brazilian footballer (born 1987)

Gustavo Adrián Maccarone (born March 17, 1987, in Itajú) is a Brazilian offensive midfielder (176 cm high / 75 kg weight) currently playing for Huracán de San Rafael of the Torneo Argentino B in Argentina.

== Teams ==
- (Argentina) Tiro Federal 2008–2011
- (Argentina) Sportivo Belgrano 2011–2014
- (Argentina) Huracán de San Rafael 2014–present
