= Emmanuel Rugamba =

Rwandan-American gridiron football player (born 1998)

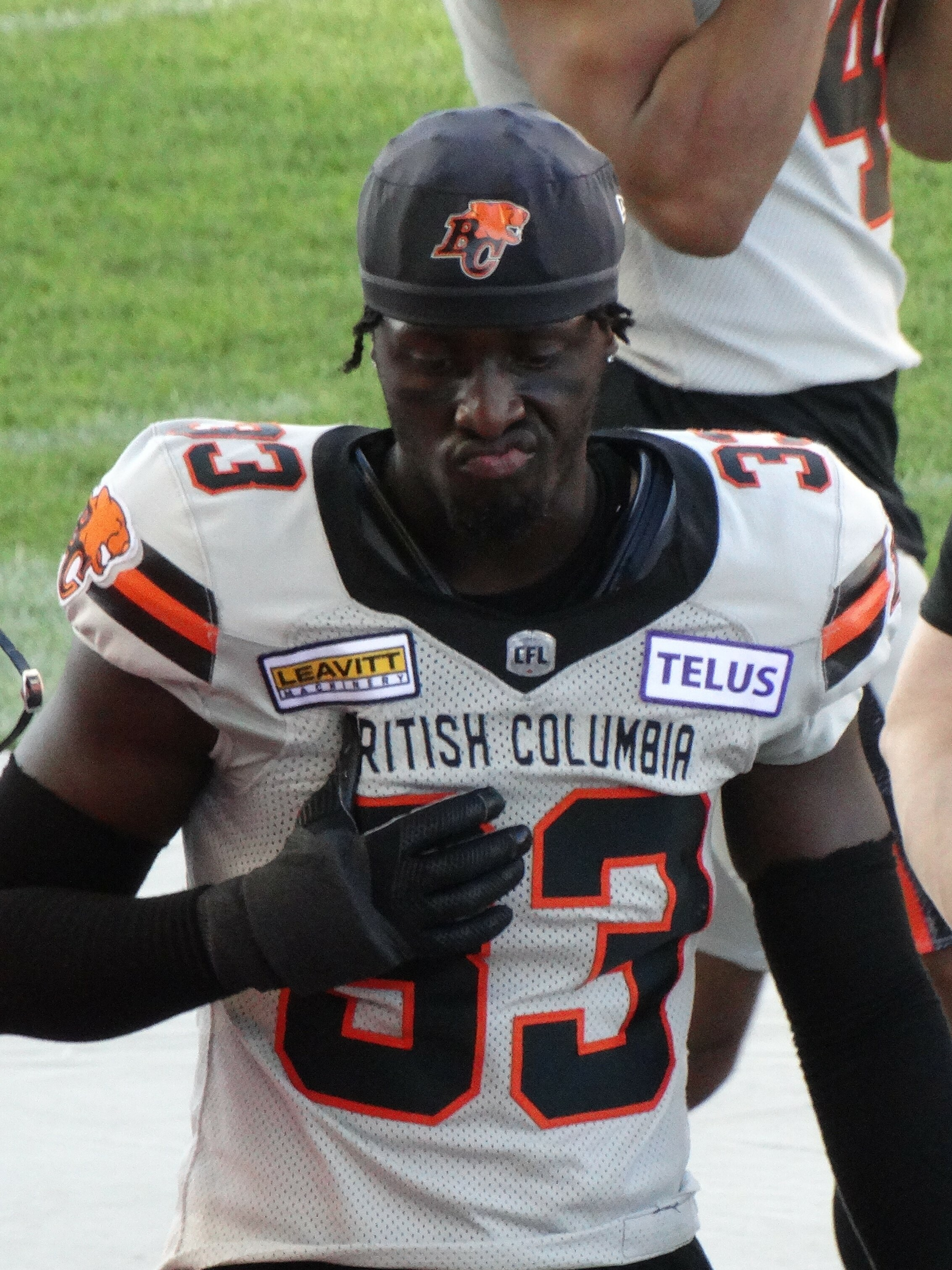
- Rugamba with the BC Lions in 2023

No. 33
- Position: Defensive back

Personal information
- Born: May 10, 1998 (age 28); Zambia
- Listed height: 5 ft 11 in (1.80 m)
- Listed weight: 194 lb (88 kg)

Career information
- High school: Naperville Central (Naperville, Illinois, U.S.)
- College: Miami (OH); Iowa
- NFL draft: 2021: undrafted

Career history
- Cleveland Browns (2021)*; BC Lions (2021–2024); Edmonton Elks (2025)
- * Offseason or practice squad member only

Awards and highlights
- CFL West All-Star (2023)
- Stats at Pro Football Reference
- Stats at CFL.ca

Emmanuel "Manny" Rugamba (born March 10, 1998) is a Rwandan-American professional gridiron football defensive back. He played college football at Miami (OH) and was signed as an undrafted free agent by the Cleveland Browns after the 2021 NFL draft, becoming the first Rwandan to be signed to an NFL team.

== Early life ==
Rugamba is of Rwandan descent but was born in a refugee camp in Zambia after his family was displaced by the Rwandan Civil War. After spending two years at the camp, his family moved to the U.S.

== College career ==
Rugamba was ranked as a three–star recruit by 247Sports.com coming out of high school. He committed to Iowa on August 1, 2015 and converted from wide receiver to cornerback. After two seasons at Iowa, Rugamba decided to transfer from Iowa on May 13, 2018. He committed to Miami (OH) shortly thereafter.

== Professional career ==
=== Cleveland Browns ===
Rugamba was signed as an undrafted free agent by the Cleveland Browns on May 3, 2021. He was waived by the Browns on August 31, 2021.

=== BC Lions ===
On February 17, 2022, it was announced that Rugamba had signed with the BC Lions. He began the season on the practice roster, but made his regular season debut on August 13, 2022, against the Calgary Stampeders where he had two defensive tackles. He was named a CFL West All-Star in 2023.

=== Edmonton Elks ===
Rugamba joined the Edmonton Elks through free agency on February 11, 2025. He was released on June 21, 2025.
