= McCarren =

McCarren is a surname. Notable people with the surname include:

- Andrea McCarren, American television journalist
- Bernard McCarren (1831-1870) American soldier, Medal of Honor recipient
- Bill McCarren (1895–1983), American baseball player
- Larry McCarren (born 1951), American football center
- Louise McCarren Herring (1909–1987), American credit union pioneer
- Patrick H. McCarren (1849–1909), New York politician

== See also ==
- McCarren Park, public park in the Greenpoint neighborhood of Brooklyn, New York City, USA
- McCarren-Walters Act, the U.S. Immigration and Nationality Act of 1952
- McCarran International Airport serving Las Vegas, Nevada
