= James Daniels =

American football player (born 1997)

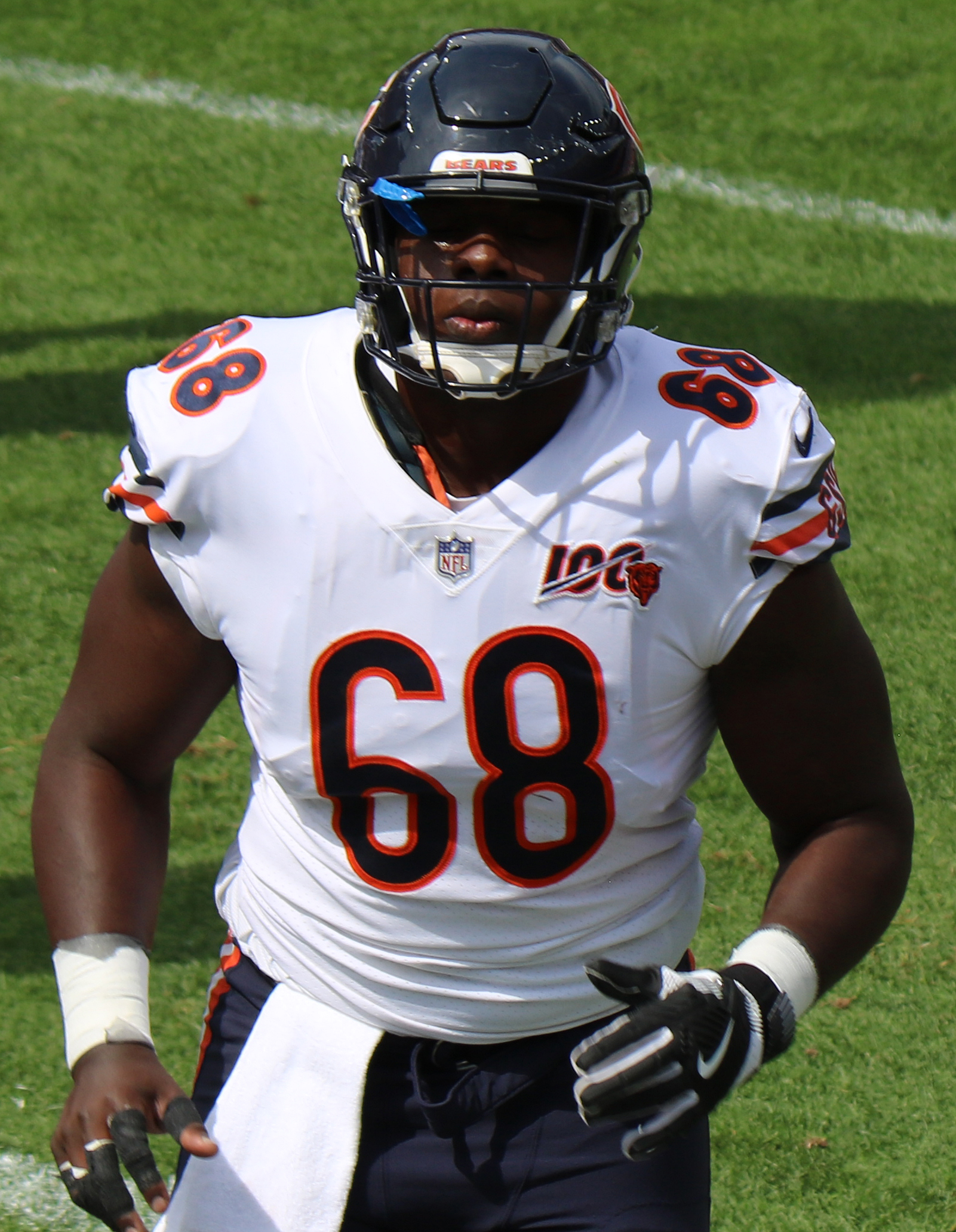
- Daniels with the Chicago Bears in 2019

Profile
- Position: Guard

Personal information
- Born: September 13, 1997 (age 29); Warren, Ohio, U.S.
- Listed height: 6 ft 4 in (1.93 m)
- Listed weight: 320 lb (145 kg)

Career information
- High school: Warren G. Harding (Warren, Ohio)
- College: Iowa (2015–2017)
- NFL draft: 2018: 2nd round, 39th overall pick

Career history
- Chicago Bears (2018–2021); Pittsburgh Steelers (2022–2024); Miami Dolphins (2025)

Awards and highlights
- Third-team All-Big Ten (2016)

Career NFL statistics
- Games played: 91
- Games started: 85
- Stats at Pro Football Reference

James Daniels (born September 13, 1997) is an American professional football guard. He played college football for the Iowa Hawkeyes, and was selected by the Chicago Bears in the second round of the 2018 NFL draft.

== Early life ==
Daniels attended Harding High School in Warren, Ohio and was a three year starter for the varsity football team. Along with football, he also participated in track. He committed to play football for the Iowa Hawkeyes in July 2014, choosing the Hawkeyes over schools such as Alabama, Auburn, and Ohio State among others.

Daniels is the younger brother of running back LeShun Daniels, who was his teammate at Iowa, and was signed by the New England Patriots as an undrafted free agent in 2017.

== College career ==
Daniels played center at Iowa from 2015 to 2017. After his junior season in 2017, he chose to forgo his senior season and enter the 2018 NFL draft. He played in 37 games for the Hawkeyes over three years.

== Professional career ==
Pre-draft measurables
Height	Weight	Arm length	Hand span	20-yard shuttle	Three-cone drill	Vertical jump	Broad jump	Bench press
6 ft 3 3/8 in (1.91 m)	306 lb (139 kg)	33 3/4 in (0.86 m)	9 1/2 in (0.24 m)	4.40 s	7.29 s	30.5 in (0.77 m)	9 ft 0 in (2.74 m)	21 reps
All values from NFL Combine

=== Chicago Bears ===
Daniels was selected by the Chicago Bears in the second round, 39th overall, of the 2018 NFL draft.

Eric Kush started the 2018 season at left guard, though Daniels was slowly integrated into the role by splitting time with Kush as the year progressed. On October 28, he became the starter at the position against the New York Jets after Kush suffered a neck injury. Daniels started 10 games as a rookie, nine at left guard and one at right guard.

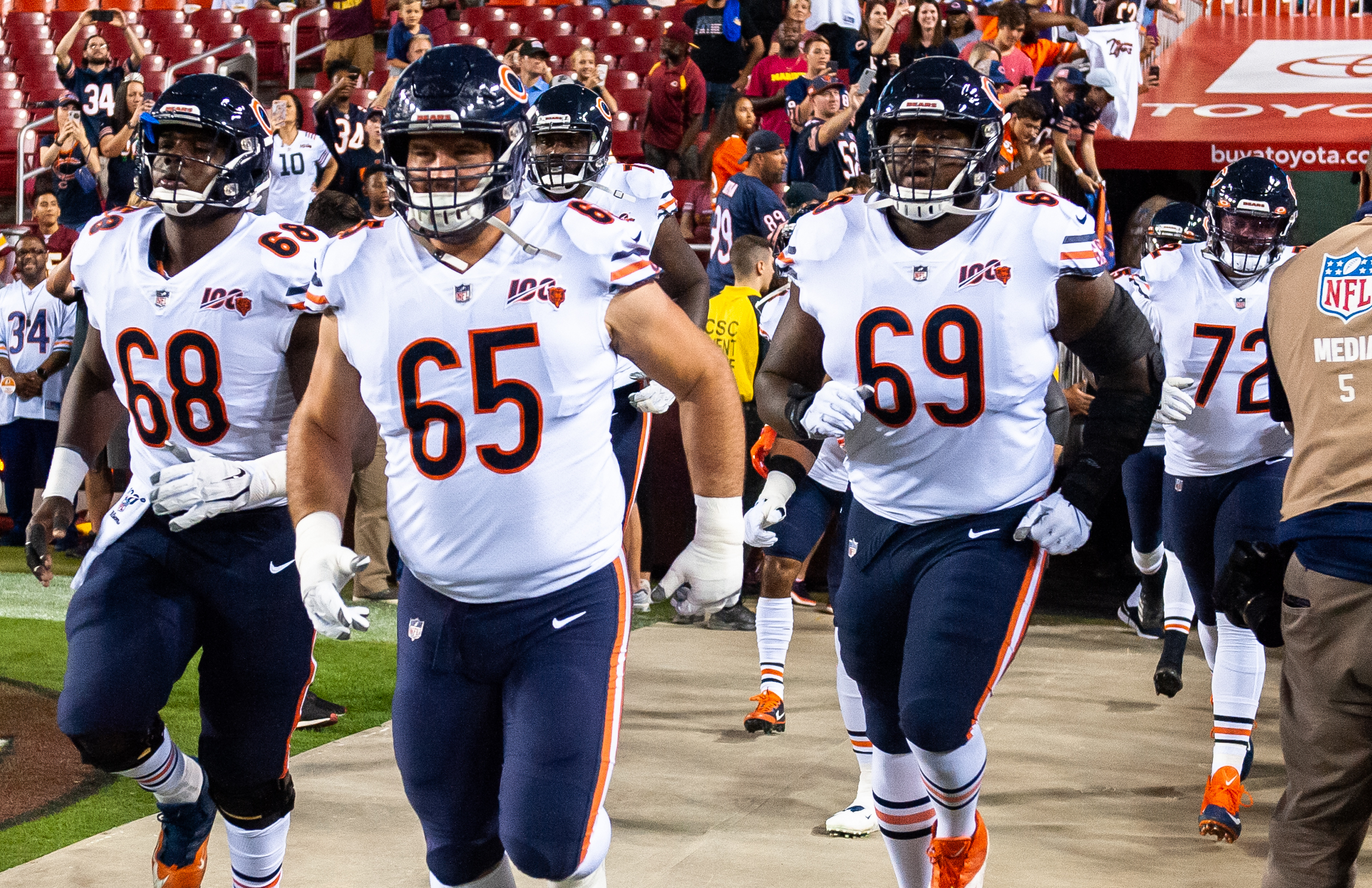
Daniels (68) in a game against the Washington Redskins

Before the 2019 season, Daniels was moved to center, with then-incumbent center Cody Whitehair shifting to left guard. In November, with the Bears' offense struggling and right guard Kyle Long being placed on injured reserve, Daniels returned to left guard.

In the fifth game of the 2020 season against the Tampa Bay Buccaneers, Daniels suffered a season-ending pectoral muscle tear. He was placed on injured reserve on October 14.

=== Pittsburgh Steelers ===
On March 17, 2022, Daniels signed a three-year, $26.5 million contract with the Pittsburgh Steelers. Daniels was the first player to wear a Guardian Cap in any organized, professional game during a preseason game against the Houston Texans on August 9, 2024.

Daniels suffered a torn Achilles in Week 4 of the 2024 season and was placed on season-ending injured reserve on October 1, 2024.

=== Miami Dolphins ===
On March 13, 2025, Daniels signed with the Miami Dolphins on a three-year, $24 million contract. He was named the Week 1 starting right guard. After suffering a pectoral injury in the game, Daniels was placed on injured reserve on September 9.

On February 16, 2026, Daniels was released by the Dolphins.
