= Riley McCarron =

American football player (born 1993)

No. 17
- Position: Wide receiver

Personal information
- Born: June 16, 1993 (age 33); Dubuque, Iowa, U.S.
- Listed height: 5 ft 9 in (1.75 m)
- Listed weight: 198 lb (90 kg)

Career information
- High school: Wahlert Catholic (Dubuque)
- College: Iowa
- NFL draft: 2017: undrafted

Career history
- Houston Texans (2017)*; New England Patriots (2017–2018)
- * Offseason or practice squad member only

Awards and highlights
- Super Bowl champion (LIII)
- Stats at Pro Football Reference

Riley McCarron (born June 16, 1993) is an American former professional football player who was a wide receiver in the National Football League (NFL). He played college football for the Iowa Hawkeyes, and was signed by the Houston Texans as an undrafted free agent after the 2017 NFL draft.

== Early life ==
McCarron attended Wahlert Catholic High School in Dubuque, Iowa, he earned second-all-state honors as a senior and was first-team all-conference as a sophomore, junior, and senior. McCarron holds records for touchdowns in a single game (6), and (36) touchdown passes in a season (17) and career punt return yards (502). As a senior McCarron completed 113-205 pass attempts for 1,749 yards and 17 touchdowns, while rushing for 866 yards and five touchdowns. McCarron recorded 45 tackles and five interceptions as a senior and 263 yards on eight punt returns. McCarron also participated in four years of baseball, basketball, and track.

== College career ==
McCarron hauled in 50 passes for 584 yards and five touchdowns in 46 games played with the Hawkeyes, McCarron also returned 19 punts for 179 yards and a touchdown and five kickoffs for 153 yards.

== Professional career ==
Pre-draft measurables
Height	Weight	40-yard dash	10-yard split	20-yard split	20-yard shuttle	Three-cone drill	Vertical jump	Broad jump
5 ft 9 in (1.75 m)	188 lb (85 kg)	4.41 s	1.50 s	2.55 s	4.16 s	6.59 s	40 1/2 in (1.03 m)	10 ft 4 in (3.15 m)
All values from Iowa's Pro Day

=== Houston Texans ===
McCarron signed with the Houston Texans as an undrafted free agent on May 12, 2017. He was waived by the Texans on September 2, 2017 and was signed to the practice squad the next day. He was released on September 18, 2017.

=== New England Patriots ===
On September 22, 2017, McCarron was signed to the New England Patriots practice squad. He signed a reserve/future contract with the Patriots on February 6, 2018 after spending his entire rookie season on the practice squad.

On September 1, 2018, McCarron was waived by the Patriots and was signed to the practice squad the next day. He was promoted to the active roster on September 6, 2018. McCarron played in the season opener on September 9, 2018 and recorded one punt return but was waived by the Patriots the next day. He was re-signed to the practice squad on September 15, 2018. McCarron won Super Bowl LIII when the Patriots defeated the Los Angeles Rams 13-3.
