= 2016 Big Ten Conference football season =

- League: NCAA Division I Football Bowl Subdivision
- Sport: Football
- Duration: September 1, 2016 through January 2017
- Teams: 14
- TV partner(s): ABC, ESPN2, ESPN Inc., Big Ten Network, FOX (championship game)

2017 NFL Draft
- Top draft pick: Marshon Lattimore (Ohio State)
- Picked by: New Orleans Saints, 11th overall

Regular season
- Season MVP: Saquon Barkley, Penn State & J. T. Barrett, Ohio State
- East Division champions: Penn State & Ohio State (co-champions)
- West Division champions: Wisconsin

Championship Game
- Champions: Penn State
- Runners-up: Wisconsin
- Finals MVP: Trace McSorley, Penn State (QB)

Football seasons
- 2015 2017

2016 Big Ten Conference football standings
	Conf.			Overall
Team	W		L	W		L
East Division
No. 7 Penn State xy$	8	–	1	11	–	3
No. 6 Ohio State x^	8	–	1	11	–	2
No. 10 Michigan	7	–	2	10	–	3
Indiana	4	–	5	6	–	7
Maryland	3	–	6	6	–	7
Michigan State	1	–	8	3	–	9
Rutgers	0	–	9	2	–	10
West Division
No. 9 Wisconsin xy	7	–	2	11	–	3
Iowa	6	–	3	8	–	5
Nebraska	6	–	3	9	–	4
Minnesota	5	–	4	9	–	4
Northwestern	5	–	4	7	–	6
Illinois	2	–	7	3	–	9
Purdue	1	–	8	3	–	9
Championship: Penn State 38, Wisconsin 31
^ – College Football Playoff participant; $ – Conference champion; x – Division champion/co-champions; y – Championship game participant; Rankings from AP Poll

The 2016 Big Ten Conference football season was the 121st season of college football play for the Big Ten Conference and is a part of the 2016 NCAA Division I FBS football season. This was the Big Ten's third season with 14 teams. The season marked a return to a nine-game conference schedule, something the league has not had since 1984.

Penn State and Ohio State each finished with identical 8–1 conference records, but Penn State won the head-to-head tiebreaker over the Buckeyes. Accordingly, Penn State won the East Division for the first time since the conference instituted divisions. Wisconsin won the West Division for the fourth time in the six years the division had existed.

In the Big Ten Championship held on December 3, 2016, at Lucas Oil Stadium in Indianapolis, Indiana, Penn State defeated Wisconsin 38–31 to win the Big Ten.

== Coaches ==
=== Coaching changes ===
Several Big Ten teams changed head coaches in 2016. Tracy Claeys at Minnesota had the "interim" tag removed from his title and served as the permanent head coach. D. J. Durkin was the new head coach at Maryland taking over for Randy Edsall after having spent the previous year as the defensive coordinator at Michigan, while Rutgers replaced Kyle Flood with Chris Ash, who comes to Piscataway after serving as a co-defensive coordinator at Ohio State. In March, new Illinois athletic director Josh Whitman announced he was replacing Bill Cubit as head football coach with Lovie Smith.

On October 16, 2016, Purdue announced they were parting ways with head coach Darrell Hazell. Receivers coach Gerad Parker was named interim head coach for the remainder of the 2016 season. On December 5, Purdue named Western Kentucky football coach Jeff Brohm their next head coach.

On December 1, 2016, Indiana University announced that head coach Kevin Wilson resigned his position. Indiana associate head coach Tom Allen was named Wilson's permanent successor. On January 3, 2017, the University of Minnesota announced they were relieving head coach Tracy Claeys of his duties. Three days later, Minnesota announced the hiring of Western Michigan coach P. J. Fleck to take over as head coach.

== Head coaches ==
Note: All records are through the completion of the 2016 season

Team	Head coach	Years at school	Overall record	Record at school	Big Ten record	Big Ten titles
Illinois	Lovie Smith	1	3–9 (.250)	3–9 (.250)	2–7 (.222)	0
Indiana	Kevin Wilson; Tom Allen**	6; 1	26–47 (.356); 0–1 (.000)	26–47 (.356); 0–1 (.000)	12–37 (.245); 0–0 (–)	0
Iowa	Kirk Ferentz	18	147–92 (.615)	135–92 (.595)	82–63 (.566)	2
Maryland	D.J. Durkin	1	6–7 (.462)	6–7 (.462)	3–6 (.333)	0
Michigan	Jim Harbaugh	2	78–33 (.703)	20–6 (.769)	13–4 (.765)	0
Michigan State	Mark Dantonio	10	108–59 (.647)	90–42 (.682)	53–28 (.654)	3
Minnesota	Tracy Claeys	2	11–8 (.579)	11–8 (.579)	6–8 (.429)	0
Nebraska	Mike Riley	2	108–91 (.543)	15–11 (.577)	9–8 (.529)	0
Northwestern	Pat Fitzgerald	11	77–61 (.558)	77–61 (.558)	41–47 (.466)	0
Ohio State	Urban Meyer	5	165–29 (.851)	61–6 (.910)	39–2 (.951)	1
Penn State	James Franklin	3	49–30 (.620)	25–15 (.625)	15–11 (.577)	1
Purdue	Darrell Hazell; Gerad Parker*	4; 1	25–43 (.368); 0–6 (.000)	9–33 (.214); 0–6 (.000)	3–24 (.111); 0–6 (.000)	0
Rutgers	Chris Ash	1	2–10 (.167)	2–10 (.167)	0–9 (.000)	0
Wisconsin	Paul Chryst	2	40–25 (.615)	21–6 (.778)	13–5 (.722)	0

* Darrell Hazell was fired on Oct. 16, 2016 and Gerad Parker was named interim coach to finish the season.

** Kevin Wilson resigned as head coach at Indiana on Dec. 1, 2016 and Tom Allen was named his full-time replacement and will coach in Indiana's bowl game.

== Regular season ==
=== Rankings ===
		Pre	Wk 2	Wk 3	Wk 4	Wk 5	Wk 6	Wk 7	Wk 8	Wk 9	Wk 10	Wk 11	Wk 12	Wk 13	Wk 14	Wk 15	Final
Illinois	AP																
Illinois	C																
Illinois	CFP	Not released															
Indiana	AP						RV										
Indiana	C	RV				RV	RV										
Indiana	CFP	Not released															
Iowa	AP	17	16	13	RV	RV		RV	RV				RV	RV	22	21	RV
Iowa	C	15	10	11	25	RV			RV				RV	RV	25	25	RV
Iowa	CFP	Not released															
Maryland	AP				RV	RV	RV										
Maryland	C				RV	RV	RV										
Maryland	CFP	Not released															
Michigan	AP	7 (1)	5 (1)	4 (1)	4 (1)	4 (1)	4 (1)	4 (1)	3 (1)	2 (1)	2 (1)	2 (1)	4	3	5	6	10
Michigan	C	8	6	5	5	5	4	4	4	2	2 (2)	3	4	4	6	6	10
Michigan	CFP	Not released									3	3	3	3	5	6	
Michigan State	AP	12	12	12	8	17	RV										
Michigan State	C	11	8	8	8	16	RV										
Michigan State	CFP	Not released															
Minnesota	AP											RV	RV	RV			RV
Minnesota	C			RV	RV	RV	RV				RV	RV		RV	RV		RV
Minnesota	CFP	Not released															
Nebraska	AP	RV	RV	RV	20	15	12	10	8	7	9	21	19	17	23	24	RV
Nebraska	C	RV	RV	RV	20	15	12	9	9	T6	10	20	17	15	22	21	RV
Nebraska	CFP	Not released									10	19	18	16			
Northwestern	AP	RV															
Northwestern	C	RV									RV						
Northwestern	CFP	Not released															
Ohio State	AP	6 (1)	4	3	2 (4)	2 (4)	2 (6)	2 (2)	2	6	6	6	2	2	2	2	6
Ohio State	C	5	4	4	2 (3)	2 (2)	2 (3)	2 (4)	2 (2)	8	6	5	2	2	2	2	6
Ohio State	CFP	Not released									6	5	2	2	2	3	
Penn State	AP									24	20	12	9	8	8	5	7
Penn State	C							RV		RV	23	14	10	8	8	5	7
Penn State	CFP	Not released									12	10	8	7	7	5	
Purdue	AP																
Purdue	C																
Purdue	CFP	Not released															
Rutgers	AP																
Rutgers	C																
Rutgers	CFP	Not released															
Wisconsin	AP	RV	10	9	11	8	11	8	10	11	8	7	6	5	6	8	9
Wisconsin	C	RV	16	12	10	8	13	10	10	11	8	7	6	6	5	8	9
Wisconsin	CFP	Not released									8	7	7	6	6	8	

Legend
	Improvement in ranking
	Drop in ranking
	Not ranked previous week
	No change in ranking from previous week
RV	Received votes but were not ranked in Top 25 of poll

=== Schedule ===
Index to colors and formatting
Big Ten member won
Big Ten member lost
Big Ten teams in **bold**

All times Eastern time.† denotes Homecoming game

==== Week 1 ====
Date	Time	Visiting team	Home team	Site	TV	Result	Attendance	Ref.
September 1	7:30 p.m.	**Indiana**	Florida International	FIU Stadium • Miami, FL	ESPNU	**W** 34–13	16,089	
September 1	9:00 p.m.	Oregon State	**Minnesota**	TCF Bank Stadium • Minneapolis, MN	BTN	**W** 30–23	44,582	
September 2	7:00 p.m.	Furman	No. 12 **Michigan State**	Spartan Stadium • East Lansing, MI	BTN	**W** 28–13	74,516	
September 3	12:00 p.m.	Bowling Green	No. 6 **Ohio State**	Ohio Stadium • Columbus, OH	BTN	**W** 77–10	107,193	
September 3	12:00 p.m.	Howard	**Maryland**	Maryland Stadium • College Park, MD	BTN	**W** 52–13	35,474	
September 3	12:00 p.m.	Hawaii	No. 7 **Michigan**	Michigan Stadium • Ann Arbor, MI	ESPN	**W** 63–3	110,222	
September 3	12:00 p.m.	Western Michigan	**Northwestern**	Ryan Field • Evanston, IL	ESPNU	**L** 21–22	30,635	
September 3	12:00 p.m.	Eastern Kentucky	**Purdue**	Ross–Ade Stadium • West Lafayette, IN	ESPNEWS	**W** 45–24	32,074	
September 3	2:00 p.m.	**Rutgers**	No. 14 Washington	Husky Stadium • Seattle, WA	Pac-12 Network	**L** 13–48	58,640	
September 3	3:30 p.m.	Kent State	**Penn State**	Beaver Stadium • University Park, PA	BTN	**W** 33–13	94,378	
September 3	3:30 p.m.	Murray State	**Illinois**	Memorial Stadium • Champaign, IL	BTN	**W** 52–3	48,644	
September 3	3:30 p.m.	No. 5 LSU	**Wisconsin**	Lambeau Field • Green Bay, WI	ABC	**W** 16–14	77,823	
September 3	3:30 p.m.	Miami (OH)	No. 17 **Iowa**	Kinnick Stadium • Iowa City, IA	ESPNU	**W** 45–21	68,390	
September 3	8:00 p.m.	Fresno State	**Nebraska**	Memorial Stadium • Lincoln, NE	BTN	**W** 43–10	90,013	
^{#}Rankings from AP Poll released prior to game. All times are in Eastern Time.

==== Week 2 ====
Date	Time	Visiting team	Home team	Site	TV	Result	Attendance	Ref.
September 9	7:30 p.m.	**Maryland**	Florida International	FIU Stadium • Miami, FL	CBS Sports Network	**W** 41–14	17,084	
September 10	12:00 p.m.	**Penn State**	Pittsburgh	Heinz Field • Pittsburgh, PA (PSU-Pitt Rivalry)	ESPN	**L** 39–42	69,983	
September 10	12:00 p.m.	Cincinnati	**Purdue**	Ross–Ade Stadium • West Lafayette, IN	BTN	**L** 20–38	33,068	
September 10	12:00 p.m.	Howard	**Rutgers**	High Point Solutions Stadium • Piscataway, NJ	BTN	**W** 52–14	45,245	
September 10	12:00 p.m.	Wyoming	**Nebraska**	Memorial Stadium • Lincoln, NE	ESPN2	**W** 52–17	89,895	
September 10	12:00 p.m.	Central Florida	No. 5 **Michigan**	Michigan Stadium • Ann Arbor, MI	ABC	**W** 51–14	109,295	
September 10	12:00 p.m.	Indiana State	**Minnesota**	TCF Bank Stadium • Minneapolis, MN	ESPNEWS	**W** 58–28	41,026	
September 10	3:30 p.m.	Tulsa	No. 4 **Ohio State**	Ohio Stadium • Columbus, OH	ABC	**W** 48–3	104,410	
September 10	3:30 p.m.	Akron	No. 10 **Wisconsin**	Camp Randall Stadium • Madison, WI	BTN	**W** 54–10	77,331	
September 10	3:30 p.m.	Illinois State	**Northwestern**	Ryan Field • Evanston, IL	BTN	**L** 7–9	30,748	
September 10	4:00 p.m.	Ball State	**Indiana**	Memorial Stadium • Bloomington, IN	ESPNEWS	**W** 30–20	41,374	
September 10	7:30 p.m.	North Carolina	**Illinois**	Memorial Stadium • Champaign, IL	BTN	**L** 23–48	60,670	
September 10	7:30 p.m.	Iowa State	No. 16 **Iowa**	Kinnick Stadium • Iowa City, IA (Rivalry)	BTN	**W** 42–3	70,585	
^{#}Rankings from AP Poll released prior to game. All times are in Eastern Time.

Date	Bye Week
September 10	#12 Michigan State

==== Week 3 ====
Date	Time	Visiting team	Home team	Site	TV	Result	Attendance	Ref.
September 17	12:00 p.m.	North Dakota State	No. 13 **Iowa**	Kinnick Stadium • Iowa City, IA	ESPN2	**L** 21–23	70,585	
September 17	12:00 p.m.	Temple	**Penn State**	Beaver Stadium • University Park, PA	BTN	**W** 34–27	100,420	
September 17	12:00 p.m.	Georgia State	No. 9 **Wisconsin**	Camp Randall Stadium • Madison, WI	BTN	**W** 23–17	79,883	
September 17	12:00 p.m.	New Mexico	**Rutgers**	High Point Solutions Stadium • Piscataway, NJ	ESPNEWS	**W** 37–28	39,680	
September 17	3:30 p.m.	No. 22 Oregon	**Nebraska**	Memorial Stadium • Lincoln, NE	ABC	**W** 35–32	90,414	
September 17	3:30 p.m.	Colorado	No. 4 **Michigan**	Michigan Stadium • Ann Arbor, MI	BTN	**W** 45–28	110,042	
September 17	4:00 p.m.	Western Michigan	**Illinois**	Memorial Stadium • Champaign, IL	ESPNEWS	**L** 10–34	40,954	
September 17	7:00 p.m.	**Maryland**	Central Florida	Bright House Networks Stadium • Orlando, FL	CBS Sports Network	**W** 30–24 ^{2OT}	43,197	
September 17	7:30 p.m.	No. 12 **Michigan State**	No. 18 Notre Dame	Notre Dame Stadium • South Bend, IN (Megaphone Trophy)	NBC	**W** 36–28	80,795	
September 17	7:30 p.m.	No. 3 **Ohio State**	No. 14 Oklahoma	Gaylord Family Oklahoma Memorial Stadium • Norman, OK	FOX	**W** 45–24	87,979	
September 17	8:00 p.m.	Duke	**Northwestern**	Ryan Field • Evanston, IL	BTN	**W** 24–13	34,464	
^{#}Rankings from AP Poll released prior to game. All times are in Eastern Time.

Date	Bye Week		
September 17	Indiana	Minnesota	Purdue

==== Week 4 ====
Date	Time	Visiting team	Home team	Site	TV	Result	Attendance	Ref.
September 24	12:00 p.m.	**Iowa**	**Rutgers**	High Point Solutions Stadium • Piscataway, NJ	ABC/ESPN2	**IA** 14–7	44,061	
September 24	12:00 p.m.	Colorado State	**Minnesota**	TCF Bank Stadium • Minneapolis, MN	ESPNU	**W** 31–24	44,854	
September 24	12:00 p.m.	Nevada	**Purdue**	Ross–Ade Stadium • West Lafayette, IN	ESPNNEWS	**W** 24–14	41,607	
September 24	12:00 p.m.	No. 11 **Wisconsin**	No. 8 **Michigan State**	Spartan Stadium • East Lansing, MI	BTN	**WISC** 30–6	75,505	
September 24	3:30 p.m.	**Penn State**	No. 4 **Michigan**	Michigan Stadium • Ann Arbor, MI	ABC	**MICH** 49–10	110,319	
September 24	3:30 p.m.	Wake Forest	**Indiana**	Memorial Stadium • Bloomington, IN	BTN	**L** 28–33	45,519	
September 24	7:30 p.m.	No. 20 **Nebraska**	**Northwestern**	Ryan Field • Evanston, IL	BTN	**NEB** 24–13	40,284	
^{#}Rankings from AP Poll released prior to game. All times are in Eastern Time.

Date	Bye Week		
September 24	Illinois	Maryland	#2 Ohio State

==== Week 5 ====
Date	Time	Visiting team	Home team	Site	TV	Result	Attendance	Ref.
October 1	12:00 p.m.	**Rutgers**	No. 2 **Ohio State**	Ohio Stadium • Columbus, OH	BTN	**OSU** 58–0	105,830	
October 1	12:00 p.m.	**Northwestern**	**Iowa**	Kinnick Stadium • Iowa City, IA	ESPNU	**NW** 38–31	67,047	
October 1	12:00 p.m.	**Purdue**	**Maryland**	Maryland Stadium • College Park, MD	BTN	**MD** 50–7	41,206	
October 1	3:30 p.m.	**Illinois**	No. 15 **Nebraska**	Memorial Stadium • Lincoln, NE	ESPN2	**NEB** 31–16	90,374	
October 1	3:30 p.m.	No. 8 **Wisconsin**	No. 4 **Michigan**	Michigan Stadium • Ann Arbor, MI	ABC	**MICH** 14–7	111,846	
October 1	3:30 p.m.	**Minnesota**	**Penn State**	Beaver Stadium • University Park, PA (Governor's Victory Bell)	BTN	**PSU** 29–26 ^{OT}	95,332	
October 1	8:00 p.m.	No. 17 **Michigan State**	**Indiana**	Memorial Stadium • Bloomington, IN (Old Brass Spittoon)	BTN	**IND** 24–21 ^{OT}	43,971	
^{#}Rankings from AP Poll released prior to game. All times are in Eastern Time.

==== Week 6 ====
Date	Time	Visiting team	Home team	Site	TV	Result	Attendance	Ref.
October 8	12:00 p.m.	**Maryland**	**Penn State**	Beaver Stadium • University Park, PA (MD-PSU rivalry)	BTN	**PSU** 38–14	100,787	
October 8	12:00 p.m.	**Iowa**	**Minnesota**	TCF Bank Stadium • Minneapolis, MN (Floyd of Rosedale)	ESPN2	**IA** 14–7	49,145	
October 8	3:30 p.m.	**Purdue**	**Illinois**	Memorial Stadium • Champaign, IL (Purdue Cannon)	BTN	**PUR** 34–31 ^{OT}	42,912	
October 8	3:30 p.m.	**Indiana**	No. 2 **Ohio State**	Ohio Stadium • Columbus, OH	ESPN	**OSU** 38–17	107,820	
October 8	3:30 p.m.	BYU	**Michigan State**	Spartan Stadium • East Lansing, MI	ABC/ESPN2	**L** 14–31	74,214	
October 8	8:00 p.m.	No. 4 **Michigan**	**Rutgers**	High Point Solutions Stadium • Piscataway, NJ	ESPN2	**MICH** 78–0	53,250	
^{#}Rankings from AP Poll released prior to game. All times are in Eastern Time.

Date	Bye Week		
October 8	#12 Nebraska	Northwestern	#11 Wisconsin

==== Week 7 ====
Date	Time	Visiting team	Home team	Site	TV	Result	Attendance	Ref.
October 15	12:00 p.m.	**Illinois**	**Rutgers**	High Point Solutions Stadium • Piscataway, NJ	ESPNEWS	**ILL** 24–7	42,640	
October 15	12:00 p.m.	**Iowa**	**Purdue**	Ross–Ade Stadium • West Lafayette, IN	ESPN2	**IA** 49–35	40,239	
October 15	12:00 p.m.	**Minnesota**	**Maryland**	Maryland Stadium • College Park, MD	ESPNU	**MIN** 31–10	41,465	
October 15	3:30 p.m.	**Northwestern**	**Michigan State**	Spartan Stadium • East Lansing, MI	BTN	**NW** 54–40	75,625	
October 15	3:30 p.m.	No. 10 **Nebraska**	**Indiana**	Memorial Stadium • Bloomington, IN	ABC/ESPN2	**NEB** 27–22	48,254	
October 15	8:00 p.m.	No. 2 **Ohio State**	No. 8 **Wisconsin**	Camp Randall Stadium • Madison, WI	ABC	**OSU** 30–23 ^{OT}	81,541	
^{#}Rankings from AP Poll released prior to game. All times are in Eastern Time.

Date	Bye Week	
October 15	#4 Michigan	Penn State

==== Week 8 ====
Date	Time	Visiting team	Home team	Site	TV	Result	Attendance	Ref.
October 22	12:00 p.m.	**Rutgers**	**Minnesota**	TCF Bank Stadium • Minneapolis, MN	ESPNU	**MIN** 34–32	46,096	
October 22	12:00 p.m.	**Indiana**	**Northwestern**	Ryan Field • Evanston, IL	BTN	**NW** 24–14	35,417	
October 22	12:00 p.m.	No. 10 **Wisconsin**	**Iowa**	Kinnick Stadium • Iowa City, IA (Heartland Trophy)	ESPN	**WIS** 17–9	70,585	
October 22	3:30 p.m.	**Illinois**	No. 3 **Michigan**	Michigan Stadium • Ann Arbor, MI	BTN	**MICH** 41–8	111,103	
October 22	3:30 p.m.	**Purdue**	No. 8 **Nebraska**	Memorial Stadium • Lincoln, NE	ABC/ESPN2	**NEB** 27–14	90,546	
October 22	7:30 p.m.	**Michigan State**	**Maryland**	Maryland Stadium • College Park, MD	BTN	**MD** 28–17	41,235	
October 22	8:00 p.m.	No. 2 **Ohio State**	**Penn State**	Beaver Stadium • University Park, PA (OSU-PSU rivalry)	ABC	**PSU** 24–21	107,280	
^{#}Rankings from AP Poll released prior to game. All times are in Eastern Time.

==== Week 9 ====
Date	Time	Visiting team	Home team	Site	TV	Result	Attendance	Ref.
October 29	12:00 p.m.	**Minnesota**	**Illinois**	Memorial Stadium • Champaign, IL	BTN	**MIN** 40–17	40,090	
October 29	12:00 p.m.	No. 2 **Michigan**	**Michigan State**	Spartan Stadium • East Lansing, MI (Paul Bunyan Trophy)	ESPN	**MICH** 32–23	75,802	
October 29	12:00 p.m.	No. 24 **Penn State**	**Purdue**	Ross–Ade Stadium • West Lafayette, IN	ABC/ESPN2	**PSU** 62–24	33,157	
October 29	3:30 p.m.	**Maryland**	**Indiana**	Memorial Stadium • Bloomington, IN	ESPNU	**IND** 42–36	38,291	
October 29	3:30 p.m.	**Northwestern**	No. 6 **Ohio State**	Ohio Stadium • Columbus, OH	ESPN	**OSU** 24–20	107,296	
October 29	7:00 p.m.	No. 7 **Nebraska**	No. 11 **Wisconsin**	Camp Randall Stadium • Madison, WI (Freedom Trophy)	ESPN	**WIS** 23–17 ^{OT}	80,833	
^{#}Rankings from AP Poll released prior to game. All times are in Eastern Time.

Date	Bye Week	
October 29	Iowa	Rutgers

==== Week 10 ====
Date	Time	Visiting team	Home team	Site	TV	Result	Attendance	Ref.
November 5	12:00 p.m.	**Indiana**	**Rutgers**	High Point Solutions Stadium • Piscataway, NJ	BTN	**IND** 33–27	37,345	
November 5	12:00 p.m.	**Michigan State**	**Illinois**	Memorial Stadium • Champaign, IL	ESPNEWS	**ILL** 31–27	47,144	
November 5	3:30 p.m.	**Maryland**	No. 2 **Michigan**	Michigan Stadium • Ann Arbor, MI	ESPN	**MICH** 59–3	110,626	
November 5	3:30 p.m.	**Purdue**	**Minnesota**	TCF Bank Stadium • Minneapolis, MN	BTN	**MINN** 44–31	42,832	
November 5	12:00 p.m.	No. 8 **Wisconsin**	**Northwestern**	Ryan Field • Evanston, IL	ABC	**WIS** 21–7	42,016	
November 5	7:30 p.m.	**Iowa**	No. 20 **Penn State**	Beaver Stadium • University Park, PA	BTN	**PSU** 41–14	106,194	
November 5	8:00 p.m.	No. 9 **Nebraska**	No. 6 **Ohio State**	Ohio Stadium • Columbus, OH	ABC	**OSU** 62–3	108,750	
^{#}Rankings from AP Poll released prior to game. All times are in Eastern Time.

==== Week 11 ====
Date	Time	Visiting team	Home team	Site	TV	Result	Attendance	Ref.
November 12	12:00 p.m.	**Rutgers**	**Michigan State**	Spartan Stadium • East Lansing, MI	BTN	**MSU** 49–0	73,701	
November 12	12:00 p.m.	**Northwestern**	**Purdue**	Ross–Ade Stadium • West Lafayette, IN	BTN	**NW** 45–17	30,548	
November 12	12:00 p.m.	No. 12 **Penn State**	**Indiana**	Memorial Stadium • Bloomington, IN	ABC / ESPN2	**PSU** 45–31	40,678	
November 12	3:30 p.m.	**Illinois**	No. 7 **Wisconsin**	Camp Randall Stadium • Madison, WI	ESPN2	**WIS** 48–3	79,340	
November 12	3:30 p.m.	No. 6 **Ohio State**	**Maryland**	Maryland Stadium • College Park, MD	ESPN	**OSU** 62–3	48,090	
November 12	7:30 p.m.	**Minnesota**	No. 21 **Nebraska**	Memorial Stadium • Lincoln, NE ($5 Bits of Broken Chair Trophy)	BTN	**NEB** 24–17	90,456	
November 12	8:00 p.m.	No. 2 **Michigan**	**Iowa**	Kinnick Stadium • Iowa City, IA	ABC	**IA** 14–13	70,585	
^{#}Rankings from AP Poll released prior to game. All times are in Eastern Time.

==== Week 12 ====
Date	Time	Visiting team	Home team	Site	TV	Result	Attendance	Ref.
November 19	12:00 p.m.	**Iowa**	**Illinois**	Memorial Stadium • Champaign, IL	BTN	**IA** 28–0	39,091	
November 19	12:00 p.m.	**Maryland**	No. 19 **Nebraska**	Memorial Stadium • Lincoln, NE	ESPNEWS	**NEB** 28–7	89,704	
November 19	12:00 p.m.	No. 7 **Wisconsin**	**Purdue**	Ross–Ade Stadium • West Lafayette, IN	ABC	**WIS** 49–20	30,465	
November 19	12:00 p.m.	No. 2 **Ohio State**	**Michigan State**	Spartan Stadium • East Lansing, MI	ESPN	**OSU** 17–16	73,303	
November 19	3:30 p.m.	**Indiana**	No. 4 **Michigan**	Michigan Stadium • Ann Arbor, MI	ESPN	**MICH** 20–10	110,288	
November 19	3:30 p.m.	**Northwestern**	**Minnesota**	TCF Bank Stadium • Minneapolis, MN	BTN	**MINN** 29–12	38,162	
November 19	8:00 p.m.	No. 9 **Penn State**	**Rutgers**	High Point Solutions Stadium • Piscataway, NJ	BTN	**PSU** 39–0	51,366	
^{#}Rankings from AP Poll released prior to game. All times are in Eastern Time.

==== Week 13 ====
Date	Time	Visiting team	Home team	Site	TV	Result	Attendance	Ref.
November 25	3:30 p.m.	No. 17 **Nebraska**	**Iowa**	Kinnick Stadium • Iowa City, IA (Heroes Trophy)	ABC	**IA** 40–10	69,814	
November 26	12:00 p.m.	**Rutgers**	**Maryland**	Maryland Stadium • College Park, MD	ESPNEWS	**MD** 31–13	30,220	
November 26	12:00 p.m.	**Purdue**	**Indiana**	Memorial Stadium • Bloomington, IN (Old Oaken Bucket)	ESPNU	**IND** 26–24	43,103	
November 26	12:00 p.m.	No. 3 **Michigan**	No. 2 **Ohio State**	Ohio Stadium • Columbus, OH (The Game)	ABC	**OSU** 30–27 ^{2OT}	110,045	
November 26	12:00 p.m.	**Illinois**	**Northwestern**	Ryan Field • Evanston, IL (Land of Lincoln Trophy)	BTN	**NW** 42–21	30,022	
November 26	3:30 p.m.	**Michigan State**	No. 8 **Penn State**	Beaver Stadium • University Park, PA (Land Grant Trophy)	ESPN	**PSU** 45–12	97,418	
November 26	3:30 p.m.	**Minnesota**	No. 5 **Wisconsin**	Camp Randall Stadium • Madison, WI (Paul Bunyan's Axe)	BTN	**WIS** 31–17	77,216	
^{#}Rankings from AP Poll released prior to game. All times are in Eastern Time.

=== Players of the Week ===
Week	Offensive			Defensive			Special Teams			Freshman		
Week	Player	Position	Team	Player	Position	Team	Player	Position	Team	Player	Position	Team
Week 1	J. T. Barrett	QB	OSU	Mike McCray	LB	MICH	Rafael Gaglianone	PK	WIS	Anthony Nelson	DE	IOWA
Week 2	Wilton Speight	QB	MICH	Nathan Gerry	S	NEB	Janarion Grant	KR	RUT	Marcelino Ball	S	IND
Week 3	Noah Brown	WR	OSU	Jabrill Peppers	LB/DB	MICH	Jabrill Peppers	LB/DB	MICH	Caleb Lightbourn	P	NEB
Week 3	Noah Brown	WR	OSU	Jerome Baker	LB	OSU	Jabrill Peppers	LB/DB	MICH	Caleb Lightbourn	P	NEB
Week 4	Tommy Armstrong Jr.	QB	NEB	T. J. Watt	LB	WIS	Ron Coluzzi	P	IA	Alex Hornibrook	QB	WIS
Week 5	Ty Johnson	RB	MD	Ifeadi Odenigbo	DL	NW	Emmitt Carpenter	PK	MN	Mike Weber	RB	OSU
Week 5	Ty Johnson	RB	MD	Marcus Allen	S	PSU	Emmitt Carpenter	PK	MN	Mike Weber	RB	OSU
Week 6	Saquon Barkley	RB	PSU	Brandon Smith	LB	PSU	J. D. Dellinger	PK	PUR	Brian Lankford-Johnson	RB	PUR
Week 7	Justin Jackson	RB	NW	Jack Cichy	LB	WIS	Solomon Vault	WR	NW	Patrick Nelson	S	ILL
Week 7	J. T. Barrett	QB	OSU	Jack Cichy	LB	WIS	Solomon Vault	WR	NW	Patrick Nelson	S	ILL
Week 8	Rodney Smith	RB	MIN	Brandon Bell	LB	PSU	Marcus Allen	S	PSU	Lorenzo Harrison	RB	MD
Week 8	Rodney Smith	RB	MIN	Brandon Bell	LB	PSU	Grant Haley	CB	PSU	Lorenzo Harrison	RB	MD
Week 9	Saquon Barkley	RB	PSU	Ryan Connelly	LB	WIS	Kenny Allen	PK/P	MICH	Tyler Natee	RB	IND
Week 9	Saquon Barkley	RB	PSU	Marcus Oliver	LB	IND	Kenny Allen	PK/P	MICH	Tyler Natee	RB	IND
Week 10	Wilton Speight	QB	MICH	Tré Watson	LB	ILL	Emmit Carpenter	PK	MINN	Connor McGovern	OG	PSU
Week 10	Curtis Samuel	RB	OSU	Tré Watson	LB	ILL	Emmit Carpenter	PK	MINN	Connor McGovern	OG	PSU
Week 11	Tommy Armstrong Jr.	QB	NEB	Jaleel Johnson	DT	IA	Keith Duncan	PK	IA	Manny Rugamba	CB	IA
Week 11	Tommy Armstrong Jr.	QB	NEB	Jaleel Johnson	DT	IA	Keith Duncan	PK	IA	John Moten IV	RB	NW
Week 12	LeShun Daniels	RB	IA	Blake Cashman	LB	MINN	Riley McCarron	WR	IA	Mike Weber	RB	OSU
Week 12	De'Veon Smith	RB	MICH	Blake Cashman	LB	MINN	Tyler Davis	PK	PSU	Mike Weber	RB	OSU
Week 13	Trace McSorley	QB	PSU	Raekwon McMillan	LB	OSU	Teldrick Morgan	WR/KR	MD	John Moten IV	RB	NW

=== Records against FBS conferences ===
2016 records against FBS conferences

==== Power-Five conferences & independents ====
Conference	Record	Winning %
ACC	2–6	.250
Big 12	2–0	1.000
Independents	1–1	.500
Pac-12	4–3	.571
SEC	1–2	.333
Total	10–12	.455

==== Group of Five Conferences ====
Conference	Record	Winning %
American	3–1	.750
C-USA	3–0	1.000
MAC	6–2	.750
Mountain West	6–0	1.000
Sun Belt	1–0	1.000
Total	19–3	.864

=== Regular season attendance ===
Team	Stadium	Capacity	Game 1	Game 2	Game 3	Game 4	Game 5	Game 6	Game 7	Game 8	Total	Average	% of Capacity
Illinois	Memorial Stadium	60,670	48,644	60,670†	40,954	42,912	40,090	47,144	39,091	–	319,505	45,644	75.2%
Indiana	Memorial Stadium	52,929	41,374	45,519	43,971	48,254†	38,291	40,678	43,103	–	301,190	43,027	81.3%
Iowa	Kinnick Stadium	70,585	68,390	70,585†	70,585†	67,047	70,585†	70,585†	69,814	–	487,591	69,656	98.7%
Maryland	Maryland Stadium	51,802	35,474	41,206	41,465†	41,235	48,090	30,220	–	–	237,690	39,615	76.5%
Michigan	Michigan Stadium	107,601	**110,222**	**109,295**	**110,042**	**110,319**	**111,846**†	**111,103**	**110,626**	**110,288**	883,741	110,468	102.7%
Michigan State	Spartan Stadium	75,005	74,516	**75,505**	74,214	**75,625**	**75,802**†	73,701	73,303	–	522,666	74,667	99.5%
Minnesota	TCF Bank Stadium	50,805	44,582	41,026	44,854	49,145†	46,096	42,832	38,162	–	306,697	43,814	86.2%
Nebraska	Memorial Stadium	86,047	**90,013**	**89,895**	**90,414**	**90,374**	**90,546**†	**90,456**	**89,704**	–	631,402	90,200	104.8%
Northwestern	Ryan Field	47,130	30,635	30,748	34,464	40,284	35,417	42,016†	30,022	–	243,586	34,798	73.8%
Ohio State	Ohio Stadium	104,944	**107,193**	104,410	**105,830**	**107,820**	**107,296**	**108,750**	**110,045**†	–	751,344	107,335	102.3%
Penn State	Beaver Stadium	106,572	94,378	100,420	95,332	100,787	**107,280**†	106,194	97,418	–	701,809	100,258	94.1%
Purdue	Ross–Ade Stadium	57,236	32,074	33,068	41,607†	40,239	33,157	30,548	30,465	–	241,158	34,451	60.2%
Rutgers	High Point Solutions Stadium	52,454	45,245	39,680	44,061	53,250†	42,640	37,345	51,366	–	313,587	44,798	85.4%
Wisconsin	Camp Randall Stadium	80,321	77,331	79,883	**81,541**†	**80,833**	79,340	77,216	–	–	476,144	79,357	98.8%
**Total**	–	1,004,101	900,071	790,655	919,334	948,124	926,476	908,788	783,119	110,288	6,418,110	65,578	88.54%

Bold – Exceed capacity
†Season High

== Big Ten Championship Game ==
Date	Time	Visiting team	Home team	Site	TV	Result	Attendance	Ref.
December 3	8:00 p.m.	No. 6 Wisconsin	No. 8 Penn State	Lucas Oil Stadium • Indianapolis, IN	FOX	PSU 38–31	65,018	
^{#}Rankings from AP Poll released prior to game. All times are in Eastern Time.

== Bowl games ==
Big Ten went 3–7 in the 2016–17 Bowl Season

Bowl game	Date	Site	Television	Time (EST)	Big Ten team	Opponent	Score	Attendance	Ref.
Quick Lane Bowl	December 26	Ford Field • Detroit, MI	ESPN	2:30 p.m.	Maryland	Boston College	BC 36–30	19,117	
Holiday Bowl	December 27	Qualcomm Stadium • San Diego, CA	ESPN	7:00 p.m.	Minnesota	Washington State	MINN 17–12	48,704	
Pinstripe Bowl	December 28	Yankee Stadium • New York, NY	ESPN	2:00 p.m.	Northwestern	Pittsburgh	NW 31–24	37,918	
Foster Farms Bowl	December 28	Levi's Stadium • Santa Clara, CA	FOX	8:30 p.m.	Indiana	Utah	UT 26–24	27,608	
Music City Bowl	December 30	Nissan Stadium • Nashville, TN	ESPN	3:30 p.m.	#24 Nebraska	Tennessee	UT 38–24	68,496	
Outback Bowl	January 2	Raymond James Stadium • Tampa, FL	ABC	1:00 p.m.	#21 Iowa	#20 Florida	FLA 30–3	51,119	
New Year's Six Bowls
Orange Bowl	December 30	Hard Rock Stadium • Miami Gardens, FL	ESPN	8:00 p.m.	#6 Michigan	#10 Florida State	FSU 33–32	67,432	
Cotton Bowl	January 2	AT&T Stadium • Arlington, TX	ESPN	1:00 p.m.	#8 Wisconsin	#12 Western Michigan	WIS 24–16	59,615	
Rose Bowl	January 2	Rose Bowl • Pasadena, CA	ESPN	5:00 p.m.	#5 Penn State	#9 USC	USC 52–49	95,128	
College Football Playoff
Fiesta Bowl (Semifinal)	December 31	University of Phoenix Stadium • Glendale, AZ	ESPN	7:00 p.m.	#2 Ohio State	#3 Clemson	CLEM 31–0	71,279	

Rankings are from AP Poll. All times Eastern Time Zone.

== Awards and honors ==
=== Players of the Year ===
2016 Big Ten Player of the Year Awards

Award	Player	School
Graham-George Offensive Player of the Year	Saquon Barkley	Penn State
Nagurski-Woodson Defensive Player of the Year	Jabrill Peppers	Michigan
Thompson-Randle El Freshman of the Year	Mike Weber	Ohio State
Griese-Brees Quarterback of the Year	J. T. Barrett	Ohio State
Richter-Howard Receiver of the Year	Austin Carr	Northwestern
Ameche-Dayne Running Back of the Year	Saquon Barkley	Penn State
Kwalick-Clark Tight End of the Year	Jake Butt	Michigan
Rimington-Pace Offensive Lineman of the Year	Pat Elflein	Ohio State
Smith-Brown Defensive Lineman of the Year	Tyquan Lewis	Ohio State
Butkus-Fitzgerald Linebacker of the Year	Jabrill Peppers	Michigan
Tatum-Woodson Defensive Back of the Year	Jourdan Lewis	Michigan
Bakken-Andersen Kicker of the Year	Emmit Carpenter	Minnesota
Eddleman-Fields Punter of the Year	Cameron Johnston	Ohio State
Rodgers-Dwight Return Specialist of the Year	Jabrill Peppers	Michigan
Hayes-Schembechler Coach of the Year (coaches vote)	Paul Chryst	Wisconsin
Dave McClain Coach of the Year (media vote)	James Franklin	Penn State
Dungy-Thompson Humanitarian Award	Trent Green	Indiana
Ford-Kinnick Leadership Award	Reggie McKenzie	Michigan

=== All-conference players ===
2016 Big Ten All-Conference Honors

Unanimous selections in ALL CAPS

Position	Player	Team
First Team Offense (Coaches)
QB	J. T. Barrett	Ohio State
RB	Saquon Barkley	Penn State
RB	Corey Clement	Wisconsin
WR	Austin Carr	Northwestern
WR	Curtis Samuel	Ohio State
TE	Jake Butt	Michigan
C	Pat Elflein	Ohio State
OG	Dan Feeney	Indiana
OG	Billy Price	Ohio State
OT	Erik Magnuson	Michigan
OT	Ryan Ramczyk	Wisconsin
First Team Defense (Coaches)
DL	Jaleel Johnson	Iowa
DL	Taco Charlton	Michigan
DL	Chris Wormley	Michigan
DL	Tyquan Lewis	Ohio State
LB	Jabrill Peppers	Michigan
LB	Raekwon McMillan	Ohio State
LB	T.J. Watt	Wisconsin
DB	Desmond King	Iowa
DB	Jourdan Lewis	Michigan
DB	Malik Hooker	Ohio State
DB	Marshon Lattimore	Ohio State
First Team Special Teams (Coaches)
K	Tyler Davis	Penn State
P	Cameron Johnston	Ohio State
RS	Jabrill Peppers	Michigan

Position	Player	Team
Second Team Offense (Coaches)
QB	Trace McSorley	Penn State
RB	Justin Jackson	Northwestern
RB	Mike Weber	Ohio State
WR	Amara Darboh	Michigan
WR	R.J. Shelton	Michigan State
TE	Troy Fumagalli	Wisconsin
C	Mason Cole	Michigan
OG	Kyle Kalis	Michigan
OG	Beau Benzschawel	Wisconsin
OT	Ben Braden	Michigan
OT	Jamarco Jones	Ohio State
Second Team Defense (Coaches)
DL	Ryan Glasgow	Michigan
DL	Malik McDowell	Michigan State
DL	Ifeadi Odenigbo	Northwestern
DL	Garrett Sickels	Penn State
LB	Josey Jewell	Iowa
LB	Anthony Walker Jr.	Northwestern
LB	Vince Biegel	Wisconsin
DB	Delano Hill	Michigan
DB	Channing Stribling	Michigan
DB	Godwin Igwebuike	Northwestern
DB	Gareon Conley	Ohio State
DB	Sojourn Shelton	Wisconsin
Second Team Special Teams (Coaches)
K	Emmit Carpenter	Minnesota
P	Kenny Allen	Michigan
RS	Desmond King	Iowa

Position	Player	Team
Third Team Offense (Coaches)
QB	Wilton Speight	Michigan
RB	Akrum Wadley	Iowa
RB	Rodney Smith	Minnesota
WR	Jordan Westerkamp	Nebraska
WR	DeAngelo Yancey	Purdue
TE	Josiah Price	Michigan State
C	Sean Welsh	Iowa
OG	James Daniels	Iowa
OG	Brian Allen	Michigan State
OT	Cole Croston	Iowa
OT	Jonah Pirsig	Minnesota
Third Team Defense (Coaches)
DL	Dawuane Smoot	Illinois
DL	Steven Richardson	Minnesota
DL	Evan Schwan	Penn State
DL	Conor Sheehy	Wisconsin
LB	Tegray Scales	Indiana
LB	Ben Gedeon	Michigan
LB	Riley Bullough	Michigan State
LB	Jason Cabinda	Penn State
DB	Rashard Fant	Indiana
DB	Nathan Gerry	Nebraska
DB	Marcus Allen	Penn State
Third Team Special Teams (Coaches)
K	Tyler Durbin	Ohio State
P	Ron Coluzzi	Iowa
RS	Parris Campbell	Ohio State

Coaches Honorable Mention: ILLINOIS: Hardy Nickerson, Carroll Phillips; INDIANA: Marcelino Ball, Ralph Green III, Richard Lagow, Marcus Oliver, Mitchell Paige, Devine Redding, Nick Westbrook; IOWA: Ike Boettger, LeShun Daniels Jr., Parker Hesse, George Kittle, Greg Mabin, Riley McCarron; MARYLAND: Michael Dunn; MICHIGAN: Kenny Allen (kicker), Ben Bredeson, Matt Godin, Mike McCray, De'Veon Smith, Dymonte Thomas; MICHIGAN STATE: Darian Hicks, Montae Nicholson, L.J. Scott; MINNESOTA: Shannon Brooks, Jonathan Celestin, Scott Epke, Jalen Myrick, Drew Wolitarsky; NEBRASKA: Tommy Armstrong Jr., Josh Banderas, Cethan Carter, Ross Dzuris, Nick Gates, Chris Jones, Kevin Maurice, De'Mornay Pierson-El (return specialist); NORTHWESTERN: Tommy Doles, Clayton Thorson; OHIO STATE: Jerome Baker, Marcus Baugh, Noah Brown, Michael Hill, Jayln Holmes, Sam Hubbard, Damon Webb; PENN STATE: Brandon Bell, Brian Gaia, Mike Gesicki, Blake Gillikin, Chris Godwin, Parker Cothren, John Reid; PURDUE: Markus Bailey, David Blough, Jason King, Evan Panfil, Jordan Roos, Joe Schopper; RUTGERS: Tariq Cole; WISCONSIN: Jack Cichy, Michael Dieter, D'Cota Dixon, T. J. Edwards, Alec James, Leo Musso, Chikwe Obasih, Jazz Peavy, Derrick Tindal.

Position	Player	Team
First Team Offense (Media)
QB	J. T. Barrett	Ohio State
RB	SAQUON BARKLEY	Penn State
RB	Justin Jackson	Northwestern
WR	Austin Carr	Northwestern
WR	Curtis Samuel	Ohio State
TE	Jake Butt	Michigan
C	Pat Elflein	Ohio State
OG	Dan Feeney	Indiana
OG	Billy Price	Ohio State
OT	Erik Magnuson	Michigan
OT	Ryan Ramczyk	Wisconsin
First Team Defense (Media)
DL	Carroll Phillips	Illinois
DL	Taco Charlton	Michigan
DL	Ifeadi Odenigbo	Northwestern
DL	Tyquan Lewis	Ohio State
LB	Jabrill Peppers	Michigan
LB	Raekwon McMillan	Ohio State
LB	T.J. Watt	Wisconsin
DB	Desmond King	Iowa
DB	Jourdan Lewis	Michigan
DB	Malik Hooker	Ohio State
DB	Sojourn Shelton	Wisconsin
First Team Special Teams (Media)
K	Emmit Carpenter	Minnesota
P	Cameron Johnston	Ohio State
RS	Jabrill Peppers	Michigan

Position	Player	Team
Second Team Offense (Media)
QB	Trace McSorley	Penn State
RB	Corey Clement	Wisconsin
RB	Mike Weber	Ohio State
WR	Amara Darboh	Michigan
WR	DeAngelo Yancey	Purdue
TE	Mike Gesicki	Penn State
C	Mason Cole	Michigan
OG	Kyle Kalis	Michigan
OG	Brian Allen	Michigan State
OT	Ben Braden	Michigan
OT	Jamarco Jones	Ohio State
Second Team Defense (Media)
DL	Jaleel Johnson	Iowa
DL	Ryan Glasgow	Michigan
DL	Chris Wormley	Michigan
DL	Malik McDowell	Michigan State
LB	Tegray Scales	Indiana
LB	Josey Jewell	Iowa
LB	Ben Gedeon	Michigan
DB	Rashard Fant	Indiana
DB	Channing Stribling	Michigan
DB	Nathan Gerry	Nebraska
DB	Marson Lattimore	Ohio State
Second Team Special Teams (Media)
K	Tyler Davis	Penn State
P	Kenny Allen	Michigan
RS	Desmond King	Iowa

Position	Player	Team
Third Team Offense (Media)
QB	Wilton Speight	Michigan
RB	L.J. Scott	Michigan State
RB	Rodney Smith	Minnesota
WR	Drew Wolitarsky	Minnesota
WR	Chris Godwin	Penn State
TE	Troy Fumagalli	Wisconsin
C	Sean Welsh	Iowa
OG	James Daniels	Iowa
OG	Beau Benzschawel	Wisconsin
OT	Jonah Pirsig	Minnesota
OT	Nick Gates	Nebraska
Third Team Defense (Media)
DL	Dawuane Smoot	Illinois
DL	Steven Richardson	Minnesota
DL	Evan Schwan	Penn State
DL	Garrett Sickels	Penn State
LB	Riley Bullough	Michigan State
LB	Anthony Walker Jr.	Northwestern
LB	Vince Biegel	Wisconsin
DB	Godwin Igwebuike	Northwestern
DB	Gareon Conley	Ohio State
DB	D'Cota Dixon	Wisconsin
DB	Leo Musso	Wisconsin
Third Team Special Teams (Media)
K	Tyler Durbin	Ohio State
P	Ron Coluzzi	Iowa
RS	Solomon Vault	Northwestern

Media Honorable Mention: ILLINOIS: Hardy Nickerson, Joe Spencer, Malik Turner, Tre Watson; INDIANA: Marcelino Ball, Jonathan Crawford, Ricky Jones, Marcus Oliver, Mitchell Paige, Devine Redding, Nick Westbrook; IOWA: Nathan Bazata, C.J. Beathard, Ike Boettger, Cole Croston, LeShun Daniels Jr., Parker Hesse, George Kittle, Riley McCarron, Akrum Wadley; MARYLAND: Jermaine Carter, Shane Cockerille, Michael Dunn; MICHIGAN: Kenny Allen, Ben Bredeson, Jehu Chesson, Delano Hill, Mike McCray, De'Veon Smith, Dymonte Thomas; MICHIGAN STATE: Chris Frey, Darian Hicks, Montae Nicholson, Josiah Price, R.J. Shelton; MINNESOTA: Jonathan Celestin, Scott Epke, Jack Lynn, Jalen Myrick, Damarius Travis; NEBRASKA: Tommy Armstrong Jr., Josh Banderas, Drew Brown, Cethan Carter, Ross Dzuris, Chris Jones, Kevin Maurice, Terrell Newby, De'Mornay Pierson-El (return specialist), Jordan Westerkamp; NORTHWESTERN: Garrett Dickerson, Tommy Doles, Montre Hartage, Clayton Thorson; OHIO STATE: Jerome Baker, Marcus Baugh, Noah Brown, Parris Campbell (return specialist), Michael Hill, Jalyn Holmes, Sam Hubbard, Denzel Ward, Chris Worley; PENN STATE: Marcus Allen, Brandon Bell, Jason Cabinda, Brian Gaia, Blake Gillikin, John Reid; PURDUE: Markus Bailey, Jason King, Evan Panfil, Jake Replogle, Jordan Roos, Joe Schopper; RUTGERS: Blessuan Austin; WISCONSIN: Jack Cichy, Michael Dieter, T.J. Edwards, Chikwe Obasih, Jazz Peavy, Conor Sheehy, Derrick Tindal.

=== All-Americans ===
The 2016 College Football All-America Team is composed of the following College Football All-American first teams chosen by the following selector organizations: Associated Press (AP), Football Writers Association of America (FWAA), American Football Coaches Association (AFCA), Walter Camp Foundation (WCFF), The Sporting News (TSN), Sports Illustrated (SI), USA Today (USAT) ESPN, CBS Sports (CBS), FOX Sports (FOX) College Football News (CFN), Scout.com, Phil Steele (PS), Athlon Sports, Pro Football Focus (PFF) and Yahoo! Sports (Yahoo!).

Currently, the NCAA compiles consensus all-America teams in the sports of Division I-FBS football and Division I men's basketball using a point system computed from All-America teams named by coaches associations or media sources. The system consists of three points for a first-team honor, two points for second-team honor, and one point for third-team honor. Honorable mention and fourth team or lower recognitions are not accorded any points. Football consensus teams are compiled by position and the player accumulating the most points at each position is named first team consensus all-American. Currently, the NCAA recognizes All-Americans selected by the AP, AFCA, FWAA, TSN, and the WCFF to determine Consensus and Unanimous All-Americans. Any player named to the First Team by all five of the NCAA-recognized selectors is deemed a Unanimous All-American.

Position	Player	School	Selector	Unanimous	Consensus
First Team All-Americans
WR	Austin Carr	Northwestern	PFF		
TE	Jake Butt	Michigan	WCFF, AFCA		*
OL	Pat Elflein	Ohio State	TSN, WCFF, AP, FWAA, AFCA, SI, USAT, ESPN, FOX, CBS, PS, Athlon	*	*
OL	Ryan Ramczyk	Wisconsin	TSN, AP, SI, USAT, ESPN, FOX, CBS, Athlon, PFF		*
OL	Dan Feeney	Indiana	AP, FOX		
OL	Billy Price	Ohio State	AFCA		
DL	Jake Replogle	Purdue	PFF		
LB	Jabrill Peppers	Michigan	TSN, WCFF, AP, FWAA, AFCA, SI, USAT, ESPN, FOX, CBS, PS, Athlon	*	*
LB	T.J. Watt	Wisconsin	SI, ESPN		
DB	Jourdan Lewis	Michigan	TSN, WCFF, AP, AFCA, SI, ESPN, CBS, Athlon		*
DB	Malik Hooker	Ohio State	TSN, WCFF, AP, FWAA, AFCA, SI, USAT, ESPN, FOX, CBS, PS, Athlon	*	*
DB	Desmond King	Iowa	SI, USAT, FOX, Athlon, PFF		
DB	Nathan Gerry	Nebraska	PFF		
AP	Curtis Samuel	Ohio State	TSN, AP, Athlon		*
AP	Jabrill Peppers	Michigan	CBS, PS, PFF		

Position	Player	School	Selector
Second Team All-Americans
RB	Saquon Barkley	Penn State	TSN
HB	Curtis Samuel	Ohio State	FWAA, FOX (AP), PS
WR	Austin Carr	Northwestern	TSN, SI, USAT
TE	Jake Butt	Michigan	TSN, AP, SI, PS, Athlon
OL	Billy Price	Ohio State	TSN, AP, SI, WCFF, FOX
OL	Ryan Ramczyk	Wisconsin	WCFF, FWAA, PS
OL	Sean Welsh	Iowa	USAT
OL	Dan Feeney	Indiana	WCFF, CBS, Athlon
OL	Kyle Kalis	Michigan	AFCA
DL	Chris Wormley	Michigan	TSN
DL	Malik McDowell	Michigan State	SI, CBS
LB	Raekwon McMillan	Ohio State	TSN, AP, AFCA, SI, USAT, WCFF, FOX, PS, Athlon
LB	Tegray Scales	Indiana	SI
LB	T.J. Watt	Wisconsin	AP, FOX, CBS, PS, Athlon
DB	Nathan Gerry	Nebraska	USAT
DB	Jourdan Lewis	Michigan	FWAA, FOX, PS
DB	Desmond King	Iowa	TSN, AP, SI, WCFF, FWAA (KR), PS (KR)
P	Cameron Johnston	Ohio State	USAT, WCFF, AP
AP	Jabrill Peppers	Michigan	SI, CBS (PR), Athlon (PR)

Position	Player	School	Selector
Third Team All-Americans
RB	Saquon Barkley	Penn State	AP, FOX, PS, Athlon
WR	Austin Carr	Northwestern	AP, FOX, PS, Athlon
TE	Jake Butt	Michigan	FOX
OL	Billy Price	Ohio State	PS, Athlon
DL	Jake Replogle	Purdue	FOX
LB	Ben Gedeon	Michigan	PS
DB	Desmond King	Iowa	PS
DB	Nathan Gerry	Nebraska	AP, FOX
P	Cameron Johnston	Ohio State	FOX

Position	Player	School	Selector
Fourth Team All-Americans
OL	Dan Feeney	Indiana	PS
OL	Mason Cole	Michigan	PS
LB	Josey Jewell	Iowa	PS, Athlon
DB	Nathan Gerry	Nebraska	Athlon

*Sporting News All-America Team (TSN)
*Sports Illustrated All-America Team (SI)
*USA Today All-America Team (USAT)
*ESPN All-America Team
*AP All-America Team
*FWAA All-America Team
*Walter Camp All-America Team (WCFF)
*FOX Sports All-America Team
*CBS Sports All-America Team
*Phil Steele All-America Team
*AFCA All-America Team
*Athlon Sports All-America Team
*Pro Football Focus All-America Team

=== Academic All-Americans ===
2016 CoSIDA Academic-All Americans

Player	School	Team
CoSIDA Academic All-Americans
Sam Hubbard	Ohio State	First Team
Tyler Yazujian	Penn State	First Team
Austin Carr	Northwestern	Second Team
Justin Jackson	Northwestern	Second Team

=== National award winners ===
John Mackey Award (Best Tight End)
Jake Butt, Michigan

Rimington Award (Best Center)
Pat Elflein, Ohio State

Lott IMPACT Trophy (Defensive Best in Character & Performance)
Jabrill Peppers, Michigan

2016 NCAA List of National Award Winners

== NFL draft ==
Team	Round 1	Round 2	Round 3	Round 4	Round 5	Round 6	Round 7	Total
Illinois	–	–	1	–	–	–	–	1
Indiana	–	–	1	–	–	–	–	1
Iowa	–	–	1	1	2	–	–	4
Maryland	–	–	–	–	–	–	–	0
Michigan	2	–	4	3	1	1	–	11
Michigan State	–	1	–	1	–	–	–	2
Minnesota	–	–	–	–	–	–	1	1
Nebraska	–	–	–	–	1	–	–	1
Northwestern	–	–	–	–	1	–	1	2
Ohio State	3	2	1	–	–	–	1	7
Penn State	–	–	1	–	–	–	–	1
Purdue	–	–	–	–	1	–	–	1
Rutgers	–	–	–	–	–	–	–	0
Wisconsin	2	–	–	1	–	–	–	3

*	= Compensatory Selections

Rnd.	Pick	Team	Player	Pos.	College	Notes
1	11	New Orleans Saints	Marshon Lattimore	CB	Ohio State	
1	15	Indianapolis Colts	Malik Hooker	S	Ohio State	
1	24	Oakland Raiders	Gareon Conley	CB	Ohio State	
1	25	Cleveland Browns	Jabrill Peppers	S	Michigan	from Houston (Note: No. 25: Houston → Cleveland (D). see No. 12: Cleveland → Houston.)
1	28	Dallas Cowboys	Taco Charlton	DE	Michigan	
1	30	Pittsburgh Steelers	T. J. Watt	LB	Wisconsin	
1	32	New Orleans Saints	Ryan Ramczyk	T	Wisconsin	from New England (Note: No. 32: New England → New Orleans (PD). New England traded their first- and third-round selections (32nd and 103rd) to New Orleans in exchange for wide receiver Brandin Cooks and New Orlean's fourth-round selection (118th).)
2	35	Seattle Seahawks	Malik McDowell	DT	Michigan State	from Jacksonville (Note: No. 35: Jacksonville → Seattle (D). see No. 34: Seattle → Jacksonville.)
2	40	Carolina Panthers	Curtis Samuel	WR	Ohio State	
2	54	Miami Dolphins	Raekwon McMillan	LB	Ohio State	
3	68	Jacksonville Jaguars	Dawuane Smoot	DE	Illinois	
3	70	Minnesota Vikings	Pat Elflein	C	Ohio State	from NY Jets (Note: No. 70: New York Jets → Minnesota (D). The Jets traded their third-round selection (70th) to Minnesota in exchange for Minnesota ‘s third-round selection (79th) and their fifth-round selection (160th).)
3	71	Los Angeles Chargers	Dan Feeney	G	Indiana	
3	74	Baltimore Ravens	Chris Wormley	DT	Michigan	from Philadelphia (Note: No. 74: Philadelphia → Baltimore (PD). Philadelphia traded their third-round selection (74th) to Baltimore in exchange for Baltimore's third-round compensatory selection (99th) and defensive tackle Timmy Jernigan.)
3	84	Tampa Bay Buccaneers	Chris Godwin	WR	Penn State	
3	92	Dallas Cowboys	Jourdan Lewis	CB	Michigan	
3	95	Seattle Seahawks	Delano Hill	S	Michigan	from Atlanta (Note: No. 95: Atlanta → Seattle (D). see No. 26: Seattle → Atlanta.)
3*	104	San Francisco 49ers	C. J. Beathard	QB	Iowa	from Kansas City via Minnesota (Note: No. 104: multiple trades: No. 104: Kansas City → Minnesota (D). see No. 86: Minnesota → Kansas City. No. 104: Minnesota → San Francisco (D). Minnesota traded their third-round selection (104th) to San Francisco in exchange for San Francisco's fourth- and seventh-round selections (109th and 219th).)
3*	106	Seattle Seahawks	Amara Darboh	WR	Michigan	
4	108	Green Bay Packers	Vince Biegel	LB	Wisconsin	from Cleveland (Note: No. 108: Cleveland → Green Bay (D). see No. 29: Green Bay → Cleveland.)
4	109	Minnesota Vikings	Jaleel Johnson	DT	Iowa	from San Francisco (Note: No. 109: San Francisco → Minnesota (D). see No. 104: Minnesota → San Francisco.)
4	120	Minnesota Vikings	Ben Gedeon	LB	Michigan	
4	123	Washington Redskins	Montae Nicholson	S	Michigan State	
4*	138	Cincinnati Bengals	Ryan Glasgow	DT	Michigan	
4*	139	Kansas City Chiefs	Jehu Chesson	WR	Michigan	from Cleveland via Philadelphia and Minnesota (Note: No. 139: Cleveland → Philadelphia (PD). see No. 12: Philadelphia → Cleveland (round one). No. 12: Cleveland → Houston (D).Cleveland traded a first-round selection (12th) to Houston in exchange for Houston's first-round selections (25th) as well as their first-round selection in 2018.)
5	145		Jake Butt	TE	Michigan	from Cleveland
5	146		George Kittle	TE	Iowa	
5	151		Desmond King	CB	Iowa	
5	161		Anthony Walker	LB	Northwestern	from Washington via San Francisco (Note: No. 161: Washington → San Francisco (PD).Washington traded their fifth-round selection to San Francisco in exchange for San Francisco's 2017 seventh-round selection and tight end Derek Carrier.)
5	175		DeAngelo Yancey	WR	Purdue	from New England via Cleveland (Note: No. 175: New England → Cleveland (PD). New England traded their fifth-round selection to Cleveland in exchange for linebacker Barkevious Mingo.)
5*	184		Nathan Gerry	S	Nebraska	from Miami
6	197	New York Jets	Jeremy Clark	CB	Michigan	from Arizona via Chicago and Los Angeles Rams (Note: No. 197: Arizona → Chicago (D). see No. 36: Chicago → Arizona.)
7	220	Minnesota Vikings	Ifeadi Odenigbo	DE	Northwestern	from San Francisco (Note: No. 220: San Francisco → Washington (PD). see No. 161: Washington → San Francisco.)
7	222	Jacksonville Jaguars	Jalen Myrick	CB	Minnesota	
7	239	Dallas Cowboys	Noah Brown	WR	Ohio State	from Detroit (Note: No. 239: Detroit → New England (PD). see No. 215: New England → Detroit.)

Trades In the explanations below, (PD) indicates trades completed prior to the start of the draft (i.e. Pre-Draft), while (D) denotes trades that took place during the 2017 draft. Please note that this is the first year where teams will be allowed to trade compensatory picks.

Round one

Round two

Round three

Round four

Round five

Round six

Round seven
