= 2016 Illinois Fighting Illini football team =

American college football season

2016 Illinois Fighting Illini football
- Conference: Big Ten Conference
- West Division
- Record: 3–9 (2–7 Big Ten)
- Head coach: Lovie Smith (1st season)
- Offensive coordinator: Garrick McGee (1st season)
- Offensive scheme: Multiple
- Defensive coordinator: Hardy Nickerson (1st season)
- Base defense: 4–3
- Home stadium: Memorial Stadium

2016 Big Ten Conference football standings
	Conf.			Overall
Team	W		L	W		L
East Division
No. 7 Penn State xy$	8	–	1	11	–	3
No. 6 Ohio State x^	8	–	1	11	–	2
No. 10 Michigan	7	–	2	10	–	3
Indiana	4	–	5	6	–	7
Maryland	3	–	6	6	–	7
Michigan State	1	–	8	3	–	9
Rutgers	0	–	9	2	–	10
West Division
No. 9 Wisconsin xy	7	–	2	11	–	3
Iowa	6	–	3	8	–	5
Nebraska	6	–	3	9	–	4
Minnesota	5	–	4	9	–	4
Northwestern	5	–	4	7	–	6
Illinois	2	–	7	3	–	9
Purdue	1	–	8	3	–	9
Championship: Penn State 38, Wisconsin 31
^ – College Football Playoff participant; $ – Conference champion; x – Division champion/co-champions; y – Championship game participant; Rankings from AP Poll

The 2016 Illinois Fighting Illini football team was an American football team that represented the University of Illinois Urbana-Champaign as a member of the Big Ten Conference during the 2016 NCAA Division I FBS football season. In their first season under head coach Lovie Smith, the Fighting Illini compiled a 3–9 record (2–7 in conference games), finished in sixth place out of seven teams in the Big Ten's West Division, and were outscored by a total of 383 to 236.

The team's statistical leaders included quarterback Wes Lunt (1,376 passing yards), running back Kendrick Foster (720 rushing yards), wide receiver Malik Turner (48 receptions for 712 yards), and kicker Chase McLaughlin (62 points scored, 26 of 26 extra points, 12 of 17 field goals).

The team played its home games at Memorial Stadium in Champaign, Illinois.

== Schedule ==
The Illini hosted all three non–conference games which were against the Murray State Racers from the Ohio Valley Conference, North Carolina Tar Heels from the Atlantic Coast Conference (ACC), and the Western Michigan Broncos from the Mid-American Conference (MAC).

Date	Time	Opponent	Site	TV	Result	Attendance
September 3	2:30 pm	Murray State*	Memorial Stadium; Champaign, IL	BTN	W 52–3	48,644
September 10	6:30 pm	North Carolina*	Memorial Stadium; Champaign, IL	BTN	L 23–48	60,670
September 17	3:00 pm	Western Michigan*	Memorial Stadium; Champaign, IL	ESPNews	L 10–34	40,954
October 1	2:30 pm	at No. 15 Nebraska	Memorial Stadium; Lincoln, NE	ESPN2	L 16–31	90,374
October 8	2:30 pm	Purdue	Memorial Stadium; Champaign, IL (rivalry)	BTN	L 31–34 ^{OT}	42,912
October 15	11:00 am	at Rutgers	High Point Solutions Stadium; Piscataway, NJ	ESPNews	W 24–7	42,640
October 22	2:30 pm	at No. 3 Michigan	Michigan Stadium; Ann Arbor, MI (rivalry)	BTN	L 8–41	111,103
October 29	11:00 am	Minnesota^{†}	Memorial Stadium; Champaign, IL	BTN	L 17–40	40,090
November 5	11:00 am	Michigan State	Memorial Stadium; Champaign, IL	ESPNews	W 31–27	47,144
November 12	2:30 pm	at No. 7 Wisconsin	Camp Randall Stadium; Madison, WI	ESPN2	L 3–48	79,340
November 19	11:00 am	Iowa	Memorial Stadium; Champaign, IL	BTN	L 0–28	39,031
November 26	11:00 am	at Northwestern	Ryan Field; Evanston, IL (rivalry)	BTN	L 21–42	30,022
*Non-conference game; ^{†}Homecoming; Rankings from AP Poll released prior to game; All times are in Central time

Schedule source:

== Game summaries ==
=== Murray State ===
	1	2	3	4	Total
Racers	0	3	0	0	3
Fighting Illini	14	21	7	10	52

=== North Carolina ===
	1	2	3	4	Total
Tar Heels	17	7	7	17	48
Fighting Illini	14	2	0	7	23

=== Western Michigan ===
	1	2	3	4	Total
Broncos	14	10	3	7	34
Fighting Illini	0	7	3	0	10

=== At Nebraska ===
	1	2	3	4	Total
Fighting Illini	0	13	3	0	16
#15 Cornhuskers	7	3	0	21	31

=== Purdue ===
	1	2	3	4	OT	Total
Boilermakers	7	14	3	7	3	34
Fighting Illini	3	13	7	8	0	31

=== At Rutgers ===
	1	2	3	4	Total
Fighting Illini	0	7	10	7	24
Scarlet Knights	0	0	0	7	7

=== At Michigan ===
	1	2	3	4	Total
Fighting Illini	0	0	0	8	8
#3 Wolverines	21	10	3	7	41

=== Minnesota ===
	1	2	3	4	Total
Golden Gophers	14	0	7	19	40
Fighting Illini	7	0	7	3	17

=== Michigan State ===
	1	2	3	4	Total
Spartans	3	3	11	10	27
Fighting Illini	0	7	10	14	31

=== At #7 Wisconsin ===
	1	2	3	4	Total
Fighting Illini	3	0	0	0	3
#7 Badgers	21	10	3	14	48

=== Iowa ===
	1	2	3	4	Total
Hawkeyes	0	7	7	14	28
Fighting Illini	0	0	0	0	0

=== At Northwestern ===
	1	2	3	4	Total
Fighting Illini	0	14	7	0	21
Wildcats	14	7	14	7	42

== Roster ==
2016 Illinois Fighting Illini football team roster
Players
Coaches
Offense

Pos.	#	Name	Class
RB	2	Reggie Corbin	Fr
QB	3	Jeff George, Jr.	Fr
WR	4	D. J. Taylor	Sr
RB	5	Ke'Shawn Vaughn	So
RB	6	Tre Nation	Fr
QB	7	Chayce Crouch	So
WR	9	Sam Mays	So
WR	11	Malik Turner	Jr
QB	12	Wes Lunt	Sr
TE	13	Caleb Reams	Fr
QB	14	Cam Miller	Fr
WR	15	M. J. McGriff	Fr
WR	16	Zarrian Holcombe	Fr
WR	18	Mike Dudek	So
WR	19	Justin Hardee	Sr
WR	21	Man Berg	Sr
RB	22	Kendrick Foster	Jr
WR	25	Trenard Davis	Fr
RB	27	Dre Brown	Fr
RB	29	Christian Bobak	Fr
DB	36	Austin Roberts	So
RB	39	Nathan Echard	Jr
OL	52	Adam Solomon	Fr
OL	53	Nick Allegretti	So
OL	57	Austin Schmidt	Sr
OL	61	Darta Lee	Fr
OL	65	Doug Kramer	Fr
OL	66	Jordan Fagan	Jr
OL	67	Christian DiLauro	Jr
OL	68	Matt Long	Fr
OL	70	Eddy Fish	Fr
OL	71	Joe Spencer	Sr
OL	72	Gabe Megginson	Fr
OL	73	Jake Cerny	Fr
OL	74	Connor Brennan	Fr
OL	75	Kurt Gavin	Fr
OL	78	Harry Black	Sr
OL	79	Zach Heath	Jr
TE	80	Ainslie Johnson	Sr
TE	81	Griffin Palmer	Fr
WR	82	Samuel Harlib	Jr
TE	83	Bobby Walker	Fr
WR	84	Dominic Thieman	Fr
TE	85	Andrew Trainer	Fr
WR	86	Desmond Cain	So
TE	87	Tyler White	Sr
WR	88	Zach Grant	Sr
TE	89	Andrew Davis	Sr

Defense

Pos.	#	Name	Class
DB	1	Jaylen Dunlap	Jr
LB	2	Julian Jones	So
DB	3	Taylor Barton	Sr
DB	4	Darwyn Kelly	Jr
LB	5	James Crawford	Jr
DL	6	Carroll Phillips	Sr
DB	7	Caleb Day	Sr
DB	8	Dillan Cazley	Sr
LB	9	Dele Harding	Fr
LB	10	Hardy Nickerson Jr.	Sr
DL	11	Chunky Clements	Sr
DB	12	Chris James	So
DL	14	Gimel President	Sr
DL	16	Rob Bain	Sr
DB	17	Stanley Green	Fr
DB	20	Harvey Clayton, Jr.	Fr
DB	21	Patrick Nelson	Fr
DB	23	Frank Sumpter	Fr
DB	24	Darius Mosely	Sr
DB	26	Evan Jones	Fr
DB	27	Ahmari Hayes	Jr
DB	30	Julian Hylton	So
DB	31	Cameron Watkins	Fr
LB	32	Justice Williams	Fr
LB	33	Tré Watson	Fr
LB	34	Christion Abercrombie	Fr
LB	35	Jake Hansen	Fr
DB	37	Zach Holman	So
LB	40	Mike Svetina	Sr
LB	41	Jimmy Marchese	Fr
DL	42	Brandon Jones	Fr
LB	44	Drew Murtaugh	Fr
DL	45	Henry McGrew	So
DL	47	Sean Adesanya	So
LB	52	Ayo Shogbonyo	Fr
DL	55	Jamal Milan	Fr
DL	76	Zeke Martin	Fr
DL	85	Brandon Roberts	Jr
DL	91	Dawuane Smoot	Sr
DL	94	Tito Odenigbo	So
DL	95	Kenyon Jackson	Fr
DL	96	Tymir Oliver	Fr

Special teams

Pos.	#	Name	Class
P	13	Ryan Frain	Sr
K	17	James McCourt	Fr
K, P	38	David Reisner	Sr
P	40	Ryan Tucker	So
K	43	Chase McLaughlin	Fr
LS	56	Michael Martin	Sr
LS	58	Sean Mills	Fr

Head coach

- Lovie Smith

Coordinators/assistant coaches

- Garrick McGee – Offensive Coordinator / Quarterbacks
- Hardy Nickerson – Defensive Coordinator
- Mike Phair – Defensive Line
- Bob Ligashesky – Special Teams Coordinator / Tight Ends
- Luke Butkus – Offensive Line
- Andrew Hayes-Stoker – Wide Receivers
- Tim McGarigle – Linebackers
- Thad Ward – Running Backs
- Paul Williams – Defensive Backs
- Joe Fotu - Graduate Assistant - Defense
- Tyler Johns - Graduate Assistant - Offense
- Brett Nelson - Graduate Assistant - Offense
- Robert Wright - Graduate Assistant - Defense
- Dean Hogan - Special Teams Analyst
- Kingsley Osei-Asibey - Defensive Analyst
- Nathan Scheelhaase - Offensive Analyst
- Tim Knox - Director of Football Operations
- Josh Sternquist - Director of Player Personnel
- Patrick Embleton - Director of Football Student-Athlete Development
- Nathan McNeal - Director of High School Relations
- Travis Perry - Graphics/Social Media
- Nina Baloun - Recruiting Assistant
- James Kirkland - Recruiting Analyst
- Joey Boese - Head Football Strength & Conditioning Coach
- Jeremy Busch - Head Football Athletic Trainer
- Trent Chestnut - Head Football Equipment Manager
- Alex Benizzi - Director of Football Video

Legend

- (C) Team captain
- (S) Suspended
- (I) Ineligible
- Injured
- Redshirt

Roster
Last update: October 13, 2016

== Awards and honors ==
Weekly

Weekly Awards
Player	Award	Date Awarded	Ref.
Patrick Nelson	Big Ten Freshman of the Week	October 17, 2016	
Tré Watson	Big Ten Defensive Player of the Week	November 7, 2016	

All-Conference

All-Big Ten
Player	Selection
Dawuane Smoot	Third Team (Coaches & Media)
Hardy Nickerson Jr.	Honorable Mention (Coaches & Media)
Carroll Phillips	First Team (Media); Honorable Mention (Coaches)
Joe Spencer	Honorable Mention (Media)
Tré Watson	Honorable Mention (Media)
