= 2016 Quick Lane Bowl =

- 3rd Quick Lane Bowl
Maryland Terrapins	Boston College Eagles
(6–6)	(6–6)
Big Ten	ACC
30	36
Head coach: D. J. Durkin	Head coach: Steve Addazio
	1	2	3	4	Total
Maryland	0	13	14	3	30
Boston College	6	23	7	0	36
- Date: December 26, 2016
- Season: 2016
- Stadium: Ford Field
- Location: Detroit, Michigan
- MVP: Boston College defensive line
- Favorite: Maryland by 2
- Referee: Steve Strimling (Pac-12)
- Attendance: 19,117
- Payout: US$1,200,000

United States TV coverage
- Network: ESPN/WJR
- Announcers: Mark Neely, Ray Bentley, Alex Corddry (TV); Frank Beckmann, Lomas Brown, Kenny Brown (Radio)

The 2016 Quick Lane Bowl was a postseason college football bowl game, played at Ford Field in Detroit, Michigan, on December 26, 2016. The third edition of the Quick Lane Bowl featured the Maryland Terrapins of the Big Ten Conference and the Boston College Eagles of the Atlantic Coast Conference.

== Teams ==
The game featured the Boston College Eagles against the Maryland Terrapins.

This was the twelfth meeting between the schools, with Boston College leading the all-time series 8–3 coming into the game. Notably, Boston College and Maryland had been together in the ACC from 2005 until 2013, after which Maryland left to join the Big Ten.

Their most recent meeting had been on November 23, 2013, when the Eagles defeated the Terrapins by a score of 29–26.

== Game summary ==
=== Scoring summary ===
Scoring summary

Quarter	Time	Drive			Team	Scoring information	Score	
Quarter	Time	Plays	Yards	TOP	Team	Scoring information	MD	BC
1	6:47	9	59	3:35	BC	Jon Hillman 1-yard touchdown run, Mike Knoll kick blocked	0	6
2	13:40	8	46	3:47	BC	Tommy Sweeney 2-yard touchdown reception from Patrick Towles, Mike Knoll kick good	0	13
2	10:32	4	13	1:25	BC	22-yard field goal by Mike Knoll	0	16
2	9:20	3	75	1:12	UMD	Ty Johnson 62-yard touchdown run, Adam Greene kick good	7	16
2	7:29	5	65	1:51	BC	Patrick Towles 20-yard touchdown reception from Jeff Smith, Mike Knoll kick good	7	23
2	6:36	3	45	0:43	UMD	Ty Johnson 30-yard touchdown run, 2-point pass from Kenneth Goins failed	13	23
2	7:29	5	65	1:51	BC	Michael Walker 49-yard touchdown reception from Patrick Towles, Mike Knoll kick failed	13	29
3	13:24				BC	Kevin Kavalec recovers fumble in the end zone for a touchdown, Mike Knoll kick good	13	36
3	12:48	2	78	0:27	UMD	Teldrick Morgan 63-yard touchdown reception from Perry Hills, Adam Greene kick good	20	36
3	10:05	2	65	0:33	UMD	Levern Jacobs 52-yard touchdown reception from Perry Hills, Adam Greene kick good	27	36
4	2:55	4	0	0:19	UMD	23-yard field goal by Adam Greene	30	36
"TOP" = time of possession. For other American football terms, see Glossary of American football.							30	36

=== Statistics ===
Statistics	MD	BC
First downs	17	15
Third down efficiency	4–15	4–19
Plays–yards	69–357	75–348
Rushes-yards (avg.)	34–128 (3.8)	52–177 (3.4)
Passing yards	229	171
Passing, Comp-Att-Int	15–35–1	11–23–1
Time of Possession	26:45	33:15
