= 2016 Maryland Terrapins football team =

American college football season

2016 Maryland Terrapins football

Quick Lane Bowl, L 30–36 vs. Boston College
- Conference: Big Ten Conference
- East Division
- Record: 6–7 (3–6 Big Ten)
- Head coach: D. J. Durkin (1st season)
- Offensive coordinator: Walt Bell (1st season)
- Offensive scheme: Spread
- Defensive coordinator: Andy Buh (1st season)
- Base defense: 4–2–5
- Home stadium: Byrd Stadium

2016 Big Ten Conference football standings
	Conf.			Overall
Team	W		L	W		L
East Division
No. 7 Penn State xy$	8	–	1	11	–	3
No. 6 Ohio State x^	8	–	1	11	–	2
No. 10 Michigan	7	–	2	10	–	3
Indiana	4	–	5	6	–	7
Maryland	3	–	6	6	–	7
Michigan State	1	–	8	3	–	9
Rutgers	0	–	9	2	–	10
West Division
No. 9 Wisconsin xy	7	–	2	11	–	3
Iowa	6	–	3	8	–	5
Nebraska	6	–	3	9	–	4
Minnesota	5	–	4	9	–	4
Northwestern	5	–	4	7	–	6
Illinois	2	–	7	3	–	9
Purdue	1	–	8	3	–	9
Championship: Penn State 38, Wisconsin 31
^ – College Football Playoff participant; $ – Conference champion; x – Division champion/co-champions; y – Championship game participant; Rankings from AP Poll

The 2016 Maryland Terrapins football team represented the University of Maryland, College Park in the 2016 NCAA Division I FBS football season. It was the Terrapins' third season as a member of the Big Ten Conference, and a member of the East Division. Maryland played its home games at Maryland Stadium in College Park, Maryland. It was their first year under new head coach D. J. Durkin. They finished the season 6–7, 3–6 in Big Ten play to finish in fifth place in the East Division. They were invited to the Quick Lane Bowl where they were defeated by Boston College.

== Schedule ==
Maryland announced its 2016 football schedule on July 11, 2013. The 2016 schedule consists of 7 home and 5 away games in the regular season. The Terrapins will host Big Ten foes Michigan State, Minnesota, Ohio State, Purdue, and Rutgers, and will travel to Indiana, Michigan, Nebraska, and Penn State.

The team will play three non–conference games, one home game against Howard Bison from the Mid-Eastern Athletic Conference, and two road games which are against the Central Florida Knights (UCF) from the American Athletic Conference and the Florida International Panthers (FIU) from Conference USA.

Date	Time	Opponent	Site	TV	Result	Attendance
September 3	12:00 pm	Howard*	Byrd Stadium; College Park, MD	BTN	W 52–13	35,474
September 9	7:30 pm	at FIU*	FIU Stadium; Miami, FL	CBSSN	W 41–14	17,084
September 17	7:00 pm	at UCF*	Bright House Networks Stadium; Orlando, FL	CBSSN	W 30–24 ^{2OT}	43,197
October 1	3:30 pm	Purdue^{†}	Maryland Stadium; College Park, MD	BTN	W 50–7	41,206
October 8	12:00 pm	at Penn State	Beaver Stadium; University Park, PA (rivalry)	BTN	L 14–38	100,778
October 15	12:00 pm	Minnesota	Maryland Stadium; College Park, MD	ESPNU	L 10–31	41,465
October 22	7:30 pm	Michigan State	Maryland Stadium; College Park, MD	BTN	W 28–17	41,235
October 29	3:30 pm	at Indiana	Memorial Stadium; Bloomington, IN	ESPNU	L 36–42	38,291
November 5	3:30 pm	at No. 2 Michigan	Michigan Stadium; Ann Arbor, MI	ESPN	L 3–59	110,626
November 12	3:30 pm	No. 6 Ohio State	Maryland Stadium; College Park, MD	ESPN	L 3–62	48,090
November 19	12:00 pm	at No. 19 Nebraska	Memorial Stadium; Lincoln, NE	ESPNews	L 7–28	89,704
November 26	12:00 pm	Rutgers	Maryland Stadium; College Park, MD	ESPNews	W 31–13	30,220
December 26	2:30 pm	vs. Boston College*	Ford Field; Detroit, MI (Quick Lane Bowl)	ESPN	L 30–36	19,117
*Non-conference game; ^{†}Homecoming; Rankings from AP Poll released prior to the game; All times are in Eastern time

== Game summaries ==
=== Howard ===
	1	2	3	4	Total
Bison	0	0	0	13	13
Terrapins	21	14	7	10	52

=== At FIU ===
	1	2	3	4	Total
Terrapins	10	21	10	0	41
Panthers	0	7	0	7	14

=== At UCF ===
	1	2	3	4	OT	2OT	Total
Terrapins	0	10	7	0	7	6	30
Knights	7	0	7	3	7	0	24

=== Purdue ===
	1	2	3	4	Total
Boilermakers	0	0	0	7	7
Terrapins	8	21	7	14	50

=== At Penn State ===
	1	2	3	4	Total
Terrapins	7	7	0	0	14
Nittany Lions	7	17	7	7	38

=== Minnesota ===
	1	2	3	4	Total
Golden Gophers	0	14	3	14	31
Terrapins	0	0	0	10	10

=== Michigan State ===
	1	2	3	4	Total
Spartans	0	14	3	0	17
Terrapins	8	6	0	14	28

=== At Indiana ===
	1	2	3	4	Total
Terrapins	7	14	3	12	36
Hoosiers	13	3	13	13	42

=== At Michigan ===
	1	2	3	4	Total
Terrapins	0	0	0	3	3
#2 Wolverines	14	21	10	14	59

=== Ohio State ===
	1	2	3	4	Total
#6 Buckeyes	21	24	10	7	62
Terrapins	3	0	0	0	3

=== At Nebraska ===
	1	2	3	4	Total
Terrapins	0	0	0	7	7
#19 Cornhuskers	14	7	7	0	28

=== Rutgers ===
	1	2	3	4	Total
Scarlet Knights	0	7	6	0	13
Terrapins	14	7	7	3	31

=== Boston College–Quick Lane Bowl ===
	1	2	3	4	Total
Terrapins	0	13	14	3	30
Eagles	6	23	7	0	36

== Roster ==
2016 Maryland Terrapins football team roster
Players
Coaches
Offense

Pos.	#	Name	Class
WR	1	D. J. Moore	So
QB	2	Caleb Henderson (I)	So
QB	3	Tyrrell Pigrome	Fr
RB	5	Wes Brown	Sr
RB	6	Ty Johnson	So
QB	7	Caleb Rowe	Sr
WR	8	Levern Jacobs	Sr
RB	9	Trey Edmunds	Sr
WR	10	D. J. Turner	Fr
QB	11	Perry Hills	Sr
WR	12	Tavion Jacobs	Jr
WR	13	DeAndre Lane	Sr
QB	14	Gage Shaffer	Fr
WR	17	Tino Ellis	Fr
QB	18	Max Bortenschlager	Fr
WR	19	Teldrick Morgan	Sr
RB	23	Lorenzo Harrison III	Fr
RB	30	Kenneth Goins	Sr
RB	32	LaDerrien Wilson	Fr
RB	33	Andrew Stefanelli	Sr
RB	34	Jake Funk	Fr
RB	35	Marcus Smith	Jr
WR	37	Josh Bekoe	Sr
WR	37	Chris Jones	Jr
RB	40	Ikechukwu Ogwuegbu	Fr
RB	42	Tehuti Miles	Sr
TE	44	Andrew Isaacs	Jr
TE	47	Kevin Woodeshick	So
TE	48	Derrick Hayward	Jr
OL	53	Quarvez Boulware	Fr
OL	54	JaJuan Dulaney	Jr
OL	55	Derwin Gray	So
OL	57	Richard Merritt	Fr
OL	58	Damian Prince	So
OL	63	Mike Minter	Jr
OL	64	Brendan Moore	So
OL	68	Ellis McKennie	Fr
OL	69	Joe Marchese	Jr
OL	70	Sean Christie	So
OL	71	E. J. Donahue	Fr
OL	74	Brian Plummer	Fr
OL	75	Terrence Davis	Fr
OL	76	Michael Dunn	Sr
OL	77	Will McClain	Fr
OL	79	Maurice Shelton	Sr
TE	80	Noah Barnes	Fr
WR	81	Zac Morton	So
TE	82	Avery Edwards	So
WR	83	Malcolm Culmer	Sr
WR	84	Jacquille Veii	Sr
WR	85	Jahrvis Davenport	So
WR	87	Michael Cornwell	So
TE	89	Eric Roca	Jr

Defense

Pos.	#	Name	Class
LB	2	Shane Cockerille	Jr
DB	4	William Likely	Sr
DB	6	Milan Collins	Jr
DB	7	J. C. Jackson	So
DB	10	Josh Woods	Jr
DB	11	Denzel Conyers	Sr
DB	12	Elijah Daniels	Fr
LB	13	Antoine Brooks	Jr
DB	14	J. T. Ventura	Jr
DE	15	Melvin Keihn	So
DB	16	Milan Barry-Pollock	Sr
DL	18	Cavon Walker	Jr
LB	19	Cal Kee	Fr
DB	20	Antwaine Richardson	Fr
DB	21	RaVon Davis	So
ILB	22	Isaiah Davis	Fr
LB	23	Jermaine Carter	Jr
DB	24	Qwuantrezz Knight	Fr
DB	26	Darnell Savage	So
DB	27	Alvin Hill	Sr
DB	28	Elisha Daniels	Fr
DB	29	Allen Corbin	Sr
LB	31	Nnamdi Egbuaba	So
DB	32	Jarrett Ross	Sr
DB	33	Luke Cheswick	Jr
ILB	38	Brett Zanotto	So
LB	39	Steve Baca	Fr
DL	41	Jesse Aniebonam	Jr
LB	43	Jalen Brooks	Jr
DB	45	Dimitri Lee	So
LB	46	Tyler Burke	So
ILB	49	Gus Little	Fr
OLB	50	Mbi Tanyi	So
DL	52	Malik Jones	Jr
LB	54	Brett Shepherd	Fr
DE	55	Dion Goldbourne	Fr
LB	56	Matt Gillespie	So
DL	57	Kingsley Opara	Jr
DL	59	Keiron Howard	Fr
DL	60	Sean Oluwatimi	Fr
DL	67	David Shaw	Jr
DL	90	Roman Braglio	Sr
DL	91	Adam McLean	Fr
DL	92	Chandler Burkett	Jr
DL	93	Oseh Saine	Fr
DL	95	Azubuike Ukandu	Sr
DL	96	Brett Kulka	So

Special teams

Pos.	#	Name	Class
K	3	Adam Greene	Jr
P	16	Nicholas Rubinowicz	Fr
P	38	Lee Shrader	So
K	41	Mike Shinsky	Fr
LS	51	Matt Oliveira	So
LS	56	Nate Adams	Jr
P	88	Wade Lees	Fr
P, K	95	Nicolas Pritchard	So
K, P	97	Daniel Sutton	Jr

Head coach

- D. J. Durkin

Coordinators/assistant coaches

- Andy Buh (defensive coordinator)
- Walt Bell (offensive coordinator / quarterbacks)
- Mike London (Associate head coach / Defensive Line)
- Pete Lembo (assistant head coach / special teams coordinator / tight ends)
- Dave Borbely (offensive line)
- Aazaar Abdul-Rahim (defensive backs)
- Matt Barnes (linebackers)
- Chris Beatty (wide receivers)
- Anthony Tucker (running backs)

Legend

- (C) Team captain
- (S) Suspended
- (I) Ineligible
- Injured
- Redshirt

Roster
Last update: September 30, 2016

== Awards and honors ==
Weekly

Weekly Awards
Player	Award	Date Awarded	Ref.
Ty Johnson	Big Ten Offensive Player of the Week	October 3, 2016	
Lorenzo Harrison	Big Ten Freshman of the Week	October 24, 2016	
Teldrick Morgan	Big Ten Special Teams Player of the Week	November 29, 2016	

All-Conference

All-Big Ten
Player	Selection	Ref.
Michael Dunn	Honorable Mention (Coaches & Media)	
Jermaine Carter	Honorable Mention (Media)	
Shane Cockerille	Honorable Mention (Media)	
