= 2016 Northwestern Wildcats football team =

American college football season

2016 Northwestern Wildcats football

Pinstripe Bowl champion

Pinstripe Bowl, W 31–24 vs. Pittsburgh
- Conference: Big Ten Conference
- West Division
- Record: 7–6 (5–4 Big Ten)
- Head coach: Pat Fitzgerald (11th season)
- Offensive coordinator: Mick McCall (9th season)
- Offensive scheme: Spread
- Defensive coordinator: Mike Hankwitz (9th season)
- Base defense: Multiple 4–3
- Captains: Austin Carr; Matthew Harris; Connor Mahoney; Anthony Walker
- Home stadium: Ryan Field

2016 Big Ten Conference football standings
| | Conf. | | | Overall |
| Team | W | | L | W | | L |
|---|---|---|---|---|---|---|
East Division
| No. 7 Penn State xy$ | 8 | – | 1 | 11 | – | 3 |
| No. 6 Ohio State x^ | 8 | – | 1 | 11 | – | 2 |
| No. 10 Michigan | 7 | – | 2 | 10 | – | 3 |
| Indiana | 4 | – | 5 | 6 | – | 7 |
| Maryland | 3 | – | 6 | 6 | – | 7 |
| Michigan State | 1 | – | 8 | 3 | – | 9 |
| Rutgers | 0 | – | 9 | 2 | – | 10 |
West Division
| No. 9 Wisconsin xy | 7 | – | 2 | 11 | – | 3 |
| Iowa | 6 | – | 3 | 8 | – | 5 |
| Nebraska | 6 | – | 3 | 9 | – | 4 |
| Minnesota | 5 | – | 4 | 9 | – | 4 |
| Northwestern | 5 | – | 4 | 7 | – | 6 |
| Illinois | 2 | – | 7 | 3 | – | 9 |
| Purdue | 1 | – | 8 | 3 | – | 9 |
Championship: Penn State 38, Wisconsin 31
^ – College Football Playoff participant; $ – Conference champion; x – Division champion/co-champions; y – Championship game participant; Rankings from AP Poll

The 2016 Northwestern Wildcats football team represented Northwestern University during the 2016 NCAA Division I FBS football season. They were led by Pat Fitzgerald who is in his 11th season as the team's head coach. The Wildcats home games were played at Ryan Field in Evanston, Illinois. They were members of the West Division of the Big Ten Conference.

== Schedule ==
Northwestern announced its 2016 football schedule on July 11, 2013. The 2016 schedule consists of 7 home and 5 away games in the regular season. The Wildcats will host Big Ten foes Illinois, Indiana, Nebraska, and Wisconsin, and will travel to Iowa, Michigan State, Minnesota, Ohio State, and Purdue.

The team will host all three non–conference games which are against the Duke Blue Devils from the Atlantic Coast Conference (ACC), Illinois State Redbirds from the Missouri Valley Conference, and the Western Michigan Broncos from the Mid-American Conference (MAC).

| Date | Time | Opponent | Site | TV | Result | Attendance |
|---|---|---|---|---|---|---|
| September 3 | 11:00 a.m. | Western Michigan* | Ryan Field; Evanston, IL | ESPNU | L 21–22 | 30,635 |
| September 10 | 2:30 p.m. | No. 10 (FCS) Illinois State* | Ryan Field; Evanston, IL | BTN | L 7–9 | 30,748 |
| September 17 | 7:00 p.m. | Duke* | Ryan Field; Evanston, IL | BTN | W 24–13 | 34,464 |
| September 24 | 6:30 p.m. | No. 20 Nebraska | Ryan Field; Evanston, IL | BTN | L 13–24 | 40,284 |
| October 1 | 11:00 a.m. | at Iowa | Kinnick Stadium; Iowa City, IA | ESPNU | W 38–31 | 67,047 |
| October 15 | 2:30 p.m. | at Michigan State | Spartan Stadium; East Lansing, MI | BTN | W 54–40 | 75,625 |
| October 22 | 11:00 a.m. | Indiana^{†} | Ryan Field; Evanston, IL | BTN | W 24–14 | 35,417 |
| October 29 | 2:30 p.m. | at No. 6 Ohio State | Ohio Stadium; Columbus, OH | ESPN | L 20–24 | 107,296 |
| November 5 | 11:00 a.m. | No. 8 Wisconsin | Ryan Field; Evanston, IL | ABC | L 7–21 | 42,016 |
| November 12 | 11:00 a.m. | at Purdue | Ross–Ade Stadium; West Lafayette, IN | BTN | W 45–17 | 30,548 |
| November 19 | 2:30 p.m. | at Minnesota | TCF Bank Stadium; Minneapolis, MN | BTN | L 12–29 | 38,162 |
| November 26 | 11:00 a.m. | Illinois | Ryan Field; Evanston, IL (rivalry) | BTN | W 42–21 | 30,022 |
| December 28 | 1:00 p.m. | vs. No. 23 Pittsburgh* | Yankee Stadium; Bronx, NY (Pinstripe Bowl) | ESPN | W 31–24 | 37,918 |
*Non-conference game; ^{†}Homecoming; Rankings from AP Poll released prior to game; All times are in Central time

Schedule source:

== Game summaries ==
=== Western Michigan ===
| | 1 | 2 | 3 | 4 | Total |
|---|---|---|---|---|---|
| Broncos | 0 | 6 | 10 | 6 | 22 |
| Wildcats | 7 | 0 | 7 | 7 | 21 |

=== Illinois State ===
| | 1 | 2 | 3 | 4 | Total |
|---|---|---|---|---|---|
| #10 (FCS) Redbirds | 0 | 6 | 0 | 3 | 9 |
| Wildcats | 0 | 0 | 0 | 7 | 7 |

=== Duke ===
| | 1 | 2 | 3 | 4 | Total |
|---|---|---|---|---|---|
| Blue Devils | 0 | 7 | 0 | 6 | 13 |
| Wildcats | 7 | 0 | 10 | 7 | 24 |

=== Nebraska ===
| | 1 | 2 | 3 | 4 | Total |
|---|---|---|---|---|---|
| #20 Cornhuskers | 0 | 10 | 14 | 0 | 24 |
| Wildcats | 0 | 7 | 6 | 0 | 13 |

=== At Iowa ===
| | 1 | 2 | 3 | 4 | Total |
|---|---|---|---|---|---|
| Wildcats | 10 | 7 | 14 | 7 | 38 |
| Hawkeyes | 7 | 14 | 3 | 7 | 31 |

=== At Michigan State ===
| | 1 | 2 | 3 | 4 | Total |
|---|---|---|---|---|---|
| Wildcats | 7 | 12 | 21 | 14 | 54 |
| Spartans | 14 | 3 | 14 | 9 | 40 |

=== Indiana ===
| | 1 | 2 | 3 | 4 | Total |
|---|---|---|---|---|---|
| Hoosiers | 3 | 0 | 9 | 2 | 14 |
| Wildcats | 14 | 10 | 0 | 0 | 24 |

=== At Ohio State ===
| | 1 | 2 | 3 | 4 | Total |
|---|---|---|---|---|---|
| Wildcats | 0 | 10 | 7 | 3 | 20 |
| #6 Buckeyes | 10 | 7 | 0 | 7 | 24 |

=== Wisconsin ===
| | 1 | 2 | 3 | 4 | Total |
|---|---|---|---|---|---|
| #8 Badgers | 0 | 10 | 3 | 8 | 21 |
| Wildcats | 0 | 7 | 0 | 0 | 7 |

=== At Purdue ===
| | 1 | 2 | 3 | 4 | Total |
|---|---|---|---|---|---|
| Wildcats | 7 | 7 | 21 | 10 | 45 |
| Boilermakers | 10 | 0 | 7 | 0 | 17 |

=== At Minnesota ===
| | 1 | 2 | 3 | 4 | Total |
|---|---|---|---|---|---|
| Wildcats | 0 | 0 | 6 | 6 | 12 |
| Golden Gophers | 6 | 6 | 3 | 14 | 29 |

=== Illinois ===
| | 1 | 2 | 3 | 4 | Total |
|---|---|---|---|---|---|
| Fighting Illini | 0 | 14 | 7 | 0 | 21 |
| Wildcats | 14 | 7 | 14 | 7 | 42 |

=== Pittsburgh–Pinstripe Bowl ===
| | 1 | 2 | 3 | 4 | Total |
|---|---|---|---|---|---|
| #22 Panthers | 3 | 7 | 7 | 7 | 24 |
| Wildcats | 0 | 14 | 7 | 10 | 31 |

== Roster ==
2016 Northwestern Wildcats football team roster
Players
Coaches
Offense

| Pos. | # | Name | Class |
|---|---|---|---|
| WR | 2 | Flynn Nagel | So |
| RB | 4 | Solomon Vault | Jr |
| WR | 5 | Charles Fessler | Fr |
| WR | 6 | Jelani Roberts | So |
| QB | 7 | Matt Alviti | Jr |
| SB | 9 | Garrett Dickerson | Jr |
| QB | 10 | T. J. Green | Fr |
| QB | 11 | Aidan Smith | Fr |
| RB | 12 | Auston Anderson | So |
| RB | 13 | Warren Long | Sr |
| QB | 14 | Lloyd Yates | Fr |
| WR | 15 | Macan Wilson | Jr |
| WR | 16 | Quinn Baker | Jr |
| QB | 17 | Daniel Kubiuk | So |
| QB | 18 | Clayton Thorson | So |
| SB | 19 | Jayme Taylor | So |
| RB | 20 | John Moten IV | Fr |
| RB | 21 | Justin Jackson | Jr |
| WR | 23 | Steven Reese | Fr |
| RB | 25 | Corey Acker | Jr |
| JR | 26 | Chad Hanaoka | So |
| RB | 28 | Jeremy Larkin | Fr |
| RB | 36 | Jesse Brown | Fr |
| SB | 44 | James Prather | So |
| SB | 46 | Eric Lutzen | So |
| SB | 48 | Cody Link | Fr |
| OL | 57 | Cam Kolwich | Fr |
| OL | 59 | J. B. Butler | So |
| OL | 60 | Jason Goosen | Fr |
| OL | 63 | Ian Park | Sr |
| OL | 64 | Andrew Otterman | Fr |
| OL | 65 | Jared Thomas | Fr |
| OL | 66 | Nik Urban | Fr |
| OL | 68 | Connor Mahoney (C) | Sr |
| OL | 69 | Brad North | Jr |
| OL | 70 | Shane Mertz | Sr |
| OL | 71 | Tommy Doles | So |
| OL | 72 | Blake Hance | So |
| OL | 73 | Gunnar Vogel | Fr |
| OL | 74 | Graham Bullmore | Jr |
| OL | 75 | Ben Oxley | So |
| OL | 76 | Eric Olson | Sr |
| OL | 77 | Jesse Meyler | Fr |
| OL | 78 | Adam Lemke-Bell | Fr |
| OL | 79 | Sam Coverdale | Jr |
| WR | 80 | Austin Carr (C) | Sr |
| WR | 81 | Ramaud Chiaokhiao-Bowman | Fr |
| WR | 82 | Andrew Scanlan | Sr |
| SB | 83 | Heath Reineke | So |
| WR | 84 | Cameron Green | Fr |
| WR | 85 | Jack Tirmonia | Fr |
| WR | 86 | Riley Lees | Fr |
| SB | 87 | Eric Eshoo | Fr |
| WR | 88 | Ben Skowronek | Fr |
| WR | 89 | Cole Johnson | Jr |

Defense

| Pos. | # | Name | Class |
|---|---|---|---|
| LB | 1 | Anthony Walker (C) | Jr |
| CB | 3 | Keith Watkins II | Jr |
| DL | 7 | Ifeadi Odenigbo | Sr |
| LB | 10 | Brett Walsh | So |
| CB | 11 | Matthew Harris (C) | Sr |
| DB | 14 | Jake Murray | Fr |
| S | 16 | Godwin Igwebuike | Jr |
| CB | 17 | Marcus McShepard | Jr |
| S | 21 | Kyle Queiro | Jr |
| DB | 22 | Parrker Westphal | So |
| CB | 24 | Montre Hartage | So |
| DB | 26 | Brian Bullock | Fr |
| DB | 27 | Roderick Campbell | Fr |
| DB | 28 | Alonzo Mayo | Fr |
| DB | 29 | Trae Williams | Fr |
| LB | 31 | Tommy Vitale | So |
| LB | 32 | Nate Hall | So |
| LB | 34 | Simba Short | Fr |
| LB | 35 | Tom Hruby | Sr |
| LB | 40 | Paddy Fisher | Fr |
| S | 41 | Jared McGee | So |
| LB | 42 | Joseph Jones | Sr |
| LB | 45 | Nathan Fox | Fr |
| DB | 47 | Joe Bergin | Fr |
| S | 48 | Tommy Odell | Jr |
| LB | 49 | Josh Roberts | Jr |
| LB | 50 | Jango Glackin | Fr |
| LB | 51 | Jaylen Prater | Sr |
| LB | 53 | Cameron Queiro | So |
| DL | 54 | Trent Goens | Fr |
| DE | 55 | Mark Gooden | Fr |
| DE | 56 | Xavier Washington | Jr |
| DL | 67 | Tyler Lancaster | Jr |
| DL | 90 | C. J. Robbins | Sr |
| DL | 92 | Fred Wyatt | So |
| DL | 93 | Greg Kuhar | Sr |
| DE | 94 | Tommy Carnifax | Fr |
| DL | 95 | Alex Miller | Fr |
| DL | 97 | Joe Gaziano | Fr |
| DT | 98 | Jake Saunders | Fr |
| DL | 99 | Jordan Thompson | So |

Special teams

| Pos. | # | Name | Class |
|---|---|---|---|
| K | 8 | Jack Mitchell | Sr |
| K, P | 33 | Matt Micucci | Sr |
| K, P | 38 | Drew Luckenbaugh | Fr |
| K | 38 | Mason Weissenhofer | Fr |
| LS | 43 | Tyler Gillikin | Fr |
| LS | 52 | Chaz Fitzpatrick | Sr |
| LS | 58 | Trevor Stroebel | Sr |
| P | 96 | Hunter Niswander | Jr |

Head coach

- Pat Fitzgerald

Coordinators/assistant coaches

- Randy Bates (linebackers)
- Jerry Brown (assistant head coach / defensive backs)
- Adam Cushing (offensive line)
- Mike Hankwitz (defensive coordinator)
- Bob Heffner (superbacks)
- Marty Long (defensive line)
- Matt MacPherson (running backs / recruiting coordinator)
- Mick McCall (offensive coordinator / quarterbacks)
- Dennis Springer (wide receivers)
- Chris Bowers (director of player personnel)
- Cody Cejda (director of football operations)
- Darby Dunnagan (director of video operations)
- David Girardi (defensive graduate assistant)
- Jay Hooten (director of sports performance for football)
- Jacob Schmidt (director of player development)
- Mike Jasinski (recruiting assistant)
- Bryan Payton (recruiting assistant)
- Christian Sarkisian (recruiting assistant)
- Mike Kafka (offensive graduate assistant)
- Steve Pursley (defensive graduate assistant)
- Tim Brandon (offensive graduate assistant)

Legend

- (C) Team captain
- (S) Suspended
- (I) Ineligible
- Injured
- Redshirt

Roster
Last update: November 7, 2016

== Awards and honors ==
Weekly Awards
| Player | Award | Date Awarded | Ref. |
|---|---|---|---|
| Ifeadi Odenigbo | Co-Big Ten Defensive Player of the Week | October 3, 2016 | |
| Justin Jackson | Big Ten Co-Offensive Player of the Week | October 17, 2016 | |
| Solomon Vault | Big Ten Special Teams Player of the Week | October 17, 2016 | |
| John Moten IV | Co-Big Ten Freshman of the Week | November 12, 2016 | |
| John Moten IV | Big Ten Freshman of the Week | November 29, 2016 | |
| Austin Carr | Richter-Howard Receiver of the Year | November 30, 2016 | |
