= 2016 Boston College Eagles football team =

American college football season

2016 Boston College Eagles football

Quick Lane Bowl champion

Quick Lane Bowl, W 36–30 vs. Maryland
- Conference: Atlantic Coast Conference
- Atlantic Division
- Record: 7–6 (2–6 ACC)
- Head coach: Steve Addazio (4th season)
- Offensive coordinator: Scot Loeffler (1st season)
- Offensive scheme: Multiple
- Defensive coordinator: Jim Reid (2nd season)
- Base defense: 4–3
- Captains: Truman Gutapfel; John Johnson; Tyler Rouse; Myles Willis
- Home stadium: Alumni Stadium

Uniform
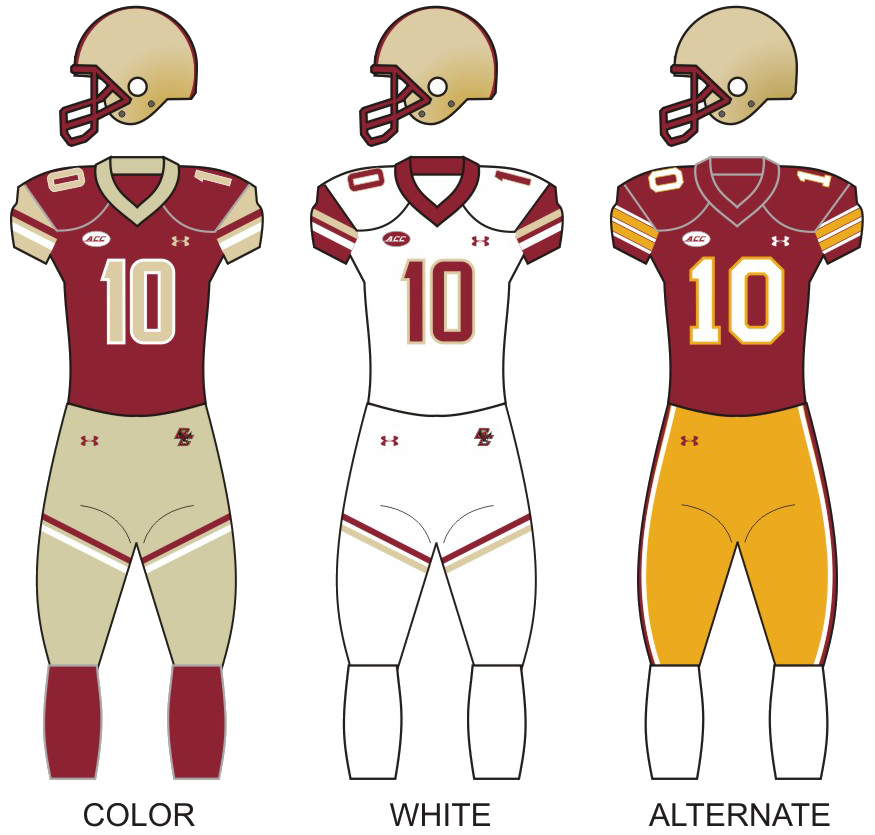

2016 Atlantic Coast Conference football standings
	Conf.			Overall
Team	W		L	W		L
Atlantic Division
No. 1 Clemson xy$#	7	–	1	14	–	1
No. 21 Louisville x	7	–	1	9	–	4
No. 8 Florida State	5	–	3	10	–	3
NC State	3	–	5	7	–	6
Wake Forest	3	–	5	7	–	6
Boston College	2	–	6	7	–	6
Syracuse	2	–	6	4	–	8
Coastal Division
No. 16 Virginia Tech xy	6	–	2	10	–	4
North Carolina	5	–	3	8	–	5
No. 20 Miami (FL)	5	–	3	9	–	4
Pittsburgh	5	–	3	8	–	5
Georgia Tech	4	–	4	9	–	4
Duke	1	–	7	4	–	8
Virginia	1	–	7	2	–	10
Championship: Clemson 42, Virginia Tech 35
# – College Football Playoff champion; $ – Conference champion; x – Division champion/co-champions; y – Championship game participant; Rankings from AP Poll

The 2016 Boston College Eagles football team represented Boston College as a member of the Atlantic Division of the Atlantic Coast Conference (ACC) in the 2016 NCAA Division I FBS football season. The Eagles were led by fourth-year head coach Steve Addazio and played their home games at Alumni Stadium. They finished the season 7–6 overall and 2–6 in ACC play to tie for sixth place in the Atlantic Division. They were invited to the Quick Lane Bowl, where they defeated Maryland.

== Background ==
=== Off-season coaching changes ===
The one clear bright spot of the 2015 Boston College Eagles football team was the defense under third-year defensive coordinator Don Brown, under whose stewardship the Eagles led the nation in total defense and were top #10 in numerous other defensive categories. But on December 21, 2015 Jim Harbaugh hired away Brown to coach the same position for the Michigan Wolverines. On the other side of the ball offensive coordinator Todd Fitch, under whom the Eagles finished 126th in total offense and 122nd in scoring offense, was not retained by Steve Addazio.

Addazio turned to Iowa linebackers coach and former Eagles defensive coordinator under Dan Henning, Jim Reid, to take over for Brown as defensive coordinator. Addazio hired former Syracuse head coach Paul Pasqualoni as defensive line coach. Pasqualoni had coached on the defensive side of the ball in the NFL for the previous few years.

On the offensive side of the ball Addazio hired former Virginia Tech offensive coordinator Scot Loeffler to take over the same position for the Eagles, replacing Fitch.

=== Off-season player losses ===
The defense lost three key contributors from the dominant 2015 team, with the graduation of Steven Daniels, Justin Simmons and Connor Wujciak. The offense lost fullback and tight end Louis Addazio.

=== Off-season player additions ===
Former Kentucky Wildcat starting quarterback, Patrick Towles transferred to Boston College as a graduate student, to compete with former sophomore starter Darius Wade, whose 2015 season was cut short by injury. Jimmy Lowery, a 4-year starting right tackle at Eastern Illinois transferred to Boston College as a graduate student. Lowery started all 13 games for Boston College at right tackle. Lowery was one of 4 Boston College football players to attain ACC All Academic status graduating in May 2017 with a master's degree in finance.

=== 2016 recruiting class ===
Coming off a disappointing 2015 football season, Steve Addazio and the Eagles managed the 74th ranked recruiting class in the nation, ranked last in the ACC by the recruiting services.

=== Preseason expectations ===
The 2016 Boston College Eagles football team entered the season with no votes in the Preseason AP Top 25 Poll. During the ACC Media Days, the ACC Sportswriters predicted Boston College to finish fifth in the Atlantic Division. College Football News predicted a 6–6 (2–6) season, good for sixth-place finish in the Atlantic Division. Athlon Sports likewise predicted the Eagles to finish sixth in the Atlantic. ESPN's Football Power Index (FPI) predicted Boston College to finish with 5.7–6.3 wins.

== Personnel ==
=== Coaching staff ===
Name	Position	Seasons at Boston College	Alma mater
Steve Addazio	Head coach	3	Central Connecticut State (1982)
Scot Loeffler	Offensive coordinator/quarterbacks	0	Michigan (1996)
Jim Reid	Defensive coordinator/linebackers	0	Maine (1972)
Paul Pasqualoni	Defensive line	0	Penn State (1971)
Justin Frye	Offensive line	3	Indiana (2006)
Al Washington	Special teams coordinator/outside linebackers	4	Boston College (2006)
Anthony Campanile	Defensive backs	0	Rutgers (2004)
Frank Leonard	Tight ends	3	Central Connecticut State (1981)
Brian White	Running backs	2	Harvard (1986)

== Schedule ==
Date	Time	Opponent	Site	TV	Result	Attendance
September 3	7:30 a.m.	vs. Georgia Tech	(Republic of Ireland) Aviva Stadium; Dublin, Ireland (Aer Lingus College Football Classic)	ESPN2	L 14–17	40,562
September 10	12:00 p.m.	at UMass*	Gillette Stadium; Foxborough, MA (rivalry)	ASN	W 26–7	25,112
September 17	3:30 p.m.	at Virginia Tech	Lane Stadium; Blacksburg, VA (rivalry)	ESPNU	L 0–49	60,054
September 24	1:00 p.m.	Wagner*	Alumni Stadium; Chestnut Hill, MA	ACCN+	W 42–10	22,728
October 1	1:00 p.m.	Buffalo*	Alumni Stadium; Chestnut Hill, MA	ACCN+	W 35–3	24,203
October 7	7:30 p.m.	No. 3 Clemson	Alumni Stadium; Chestnut Hill, MA (O'Rourke–McFadden Trophy)	ESPN	L 10–56	44,500
October 22	12:30 p.m.	Syracuse^{†}	Alumni Stadium; Chestnut Hill, MA	ACCN	L 20–28	34,647
October 29	12:30 p.m.	at NC State	Carter–Finley Stadium; Raleigh, NC	ACCN	W 21–14	56,443
November 5	12:00 p.m.	No. 5 Louisville	Alumni Stadium; Chestnut Hill, MA	ESPN2	L 7–52	30,644
November 11	7:30 p.m.	at No. 20 Florida State	Doak Campbell Stadium; Tallahassee, FL	ESPN2	L 7–45	73,917
November 19	1:00 p.m.	UConn*	Alumni Stadium; Chestnut Hill, MA	ACCN+	W 30–0	36,220
November 26	3:00 p.m.	at Wake Forest	BB&T Field; Winston-Salem, NC	ACCRSN	W 17–14	24,866
December 26	2:30 p.m.	vs. Maryland*	Ford Field; Detroit, MI (Quick Lane Bowl)	ESPN	W 36–30	19,117
*Non-conference game; ^{†}Homecoming; Rankings from AP Poll released prior to the game; All times are in Eastern time

== Game summaries ==
=== Vs. Georgia Tech ===
	1	2	3	4	Total
Yellow Jackets	7	0	0	10	17
Eagles	0	0	7	7	14

=== At UMass ===
	1	2	3	4	Total
Eagles	0	13	6	7	26
Minutemen	7	0	0	0	7

=== At Virginia Tech ===
	1	2	3	4	Total
Eagles	0	0	0	0	0
Hokies	14	7	21	7	49

=== Wagner ===
	1	2	3	4	Total
Seahawks	7	3	0	0	10
Eagles	14	14	14	0	42

=== Buffalo ===
	1	2	3	4	Total
Bulls	0	3	0	0	3
Eagles	7	14	0	14	35

=== Clemson ===
	1	2	3	4	Total
#3 Tigers	21	0	14	21	56
Eagles	3	0	7	0	10

=== Syracuse ===
	1	2	3	4	Total
Orange	7	7	7	7	28
Eagles	3	7	7	3	20

=== At NC State ===
	1	2	3	4	Total
Eagles	0	10	3	8	21
Wolfpack	0	7	7	0	14

=== Louisville ===
	1	2	3	4	Total
#5 Cardinals	21	17	14	0	52
Eagles	0	0	7	0	7

=== At Florida State ===
	1	2	3	4	Total
Eagles	0	0	0	7	7
#20 Seminoles	14	7	14	10	45

=== UConn ===
	1	2	3	4	Total
Huskies	0	0	0	0	0
Eagles	0	10	10	10	30

=== At Wake Forest ===
	1	2	3	4	Total
Eagles	10	0	0	7	17
Demon Deacons	0	0	14	0	14

=== Maryland–Quick Lane Bowl ===
	1	2	3	4	Total
Terrapins	0	13	14	3	30
Eagles	6	23	7	0	36

== 2017 NFL draft ==
2017	3	27	91	John Johnson	Los Angeles Rams	DB
2017	5	19	163	Matt Milano	Buffalo Bills	LB
