= Carroll Phillips =

American football player (born 1992)

No. 59, 58
- Position: Defensive end

Personal information
- Born: September 2, 1992 (age 34); Miami, Florida, U.S.
- Listed height: 6 ft 3 in (1.91 m)
- Listed weight: 242 lb (110 kg)

Career information
- High school: Miami Central (West Little River, Florida)
- College: Illinois
- NFL draft: 2017: undrafted

Career history
- Jacksonville Jaguars (2017); Indianapolis Colts (2018); Washington Redskins (2019); Atlanta Falcons (2019)*; TSL Generals (2021); Philadelphia Stars (2022)
- * Offseason or practice squad member only

Awards and highlights
- First-team All-Big Ten (2016)

Career NFL statistics
- Total tackles: 5
- Stats at Pro Football Reference

Carroll Phillips (born September 2, 1992) is an American former professional football player who was a defensive end in the National Football League (NFL). He played college football for the Illinois Fighting Illini.

== Professional career ==
=== Jacksonville Jaguars ===
Phillips signed with the Jacksonville Jaguars as an undrafted free agent on May 1, 2017. He was waived by the Jaguars on September 2, 2017, and was signed to the practice squad the next day. He was promoted to the active roster on December 2, 2017.

On September 1, 2018, Phillips was waived by the Jaguars.

=== Indianapolis Colts ===
On September 3, 2018, Phillips was signed to the Indianapolis Colts' practice squad. He was promoted to the active roster on September 28, 2018. He was placed on injured reserve on November 13, 2018, with a groin injury.

On August 31, 2019, Phillips was waived by the Colts.

=== Washington Redskins ===
On October 30, 2019, Phillips was signed to the Washington Redskins practice squad. He was promoted to the active roster on November 19, 2019. He was waived on November 30.

=== Atlanta Falcons ===
On December 18, 2019, Phillips was signed to the Atlanta Falcons practice squad. His practice squad contract with the team expired on January 6, 2020.

=== Philadelphia Stars ===
Phillips was selected with the sixth pick of the fourth round of the 2022 USFL draft by the Philadelphia Stars. He was transferred to the team's inactive roster on May 5, 2022, with lumbar neuropathy. He was released on May 10.
