= Dawuane Smoot =

American football player (born 1995)

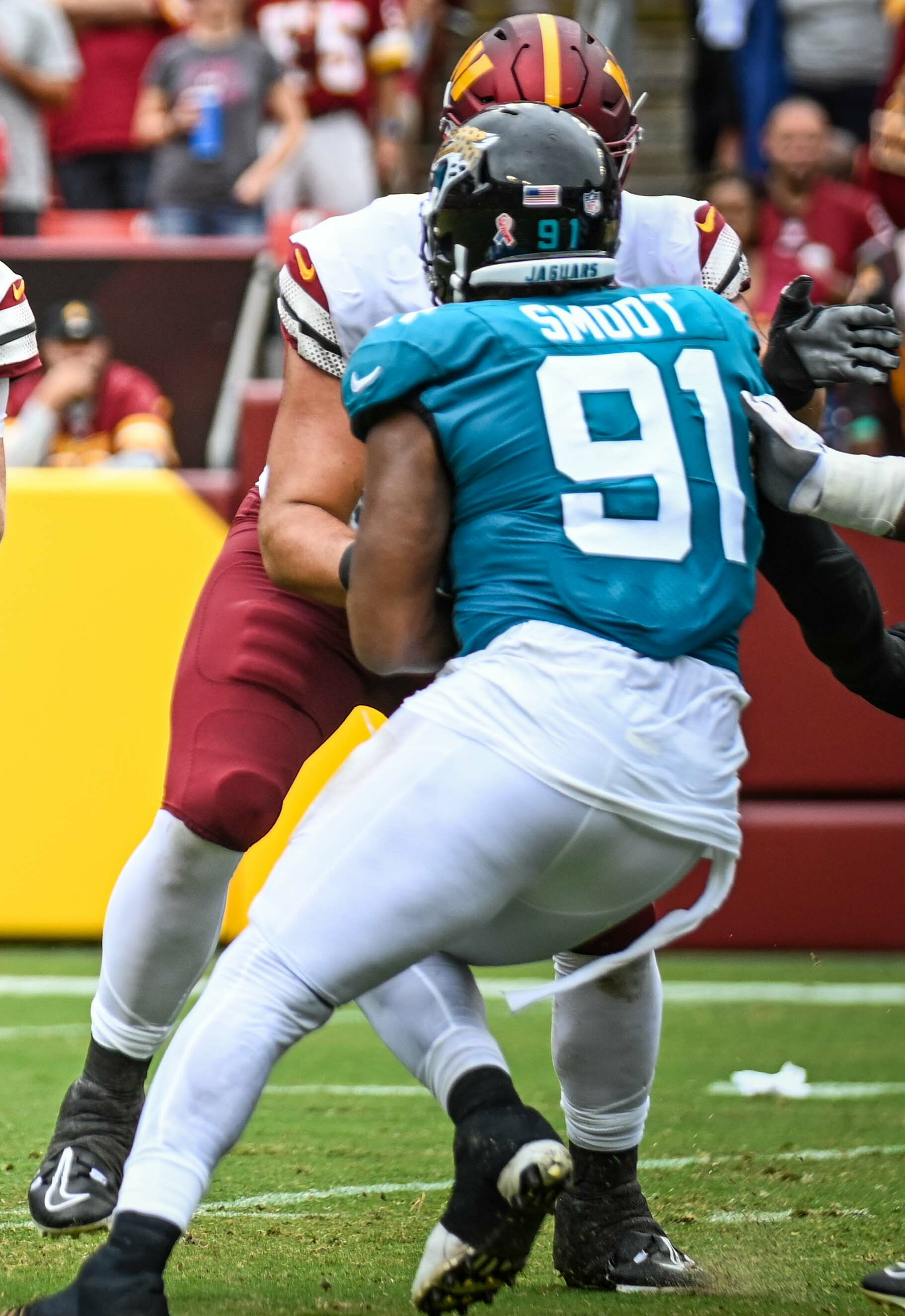
- Smoot with the Jacksonville Jaguars in 2022

No. 96 – New York Giants
- Position: Defensive end
- Roster status: Practice squad

Personal information
- Born: March 2, 1995 (age 31); Groveport, Ohio, U.S.
- Listed height: 6 ft 3 in (1.91 m)
- Listed weight: 264 lb (120 kg)

Career information
- High school: Groveport Madison
- College: Illinois (2013–2016)
- NFL draft: 2017: 3rd round, 68th overall pick

Career history
- Jacksonville Jaguars (2017–2023); Buffalo Bills (2024); Jacksonville Jaguars (2025–2026); New York Giants (2026–present)

Career NFL statistics as of Week 9, 2026
- Total tackles: 174
- Sacks: 28
- Pass deflections: 6
- Forced fumbles: 7
- Fumble recoveries: 2
- Stats at Pro Football Reference

Dawuane "D.J." Smoot (born March 2, 1995) is an American professional football defensive end for the New York Giants of the National Football League (NFL). He played college football at Illinois, and was selected by the Jacksonville Jaguars in the third round of the 2017 NFL draft. He has also played for the Buffalo Bills.

== Early life ==
Smoot briefly attended Saint Charles Preparatory School but graduated from Groveport Madison High School in Groveport, Ohio. During his high school career, he had 260 tackles and 30 sacks. He committed to the University of Illinois to play college football.

== College career ==
Smoot played in seven games as a true freshman at Illinois in 2013, recording eight tackles and one sack. As a sophomore in 2014 he played in all 13 games and had 33 tackles and 2.5 sacks. As a junior in 2015 he started all 12 games, recording 40 tackles, eight sacks and three forced fumbles. On November 29, 2016, Smoot was named Third-team All-Big Ten Conference by the coaches and media.

== Professional career ==
Smoot contemplated leaving Illinois after his junior season and received a second round grade for the 2016 NFL draft from the NFL advisory board. He decided to stay for his senior year and was the 24th overall prospect on Todd McShay's big board heading into 2017. He received an invitation to the 2017 Senior Bowl and practiced well throughout the week. He played defensive end for the North, but was held without a tackle as the North were defeated 16-15 by the South. Smoot attended the NFL Combine and completed most of the combine and positional drills, but decided not to perform the bench press. He also participated at Illinois' Pro Day and chose to perform the bench and have another attempt at the vertical. NFL draft experts and analysts projected him to be selected in the third or fourth round. He was ranked the 15th best defensive end available in the draft by NFLDraftScout.com.

Pre-draft measurables
Height	Weight	Arm length	Hand span	Wingspan	40-yard dash	10-yard split	20-yard split	20-yard shuttle	Three-cone drill	Vertical jump	Broad jump	Bench press
6 ft 3 1/8 in (1.91 m)	264 lb (120 kg)	33 1/4 in (0.84 m)	9 1/4 in (0.23 m)	6 ft 7 in (2.01 m)	4.77 s	1.68 s	2.78 s	4.39 s	7.18 s	29.5 in (0.75 m)	9 ft 9 in (2.97 m)	21 reps
All values from NFL Combine/Illinois' Pro Day

=== Jacksonville Jaguars ===
Smoot was selected by the Jacksonville Jaguars in the third round (68th overall) of the 2017 NFL draft. Smoot made the Jaguars team and played in all 16 regular season games, as well as Jacksonville's three playoff games.

In Week 3 of the 2019 season, Smoot recorded his first two career sacks on Marcus Mariota in the 20–7 win.

Smoot signed a two-year, $10 million contract extension with the Jaguars on March 16, 2021.

On July 21, 2023, after spending four months without a team, the Jaguars re-signed Smoot, who had been rehabbing an Achilles tendon injury he suffered late in the 2022 season. He was placed on the reserve/PUP list to start the 2023 season. Smoot was activated from the PUP list on October 14.

=== Buffalo Bills ===
On May 3, 2024, Smoot signed a one-year contract with the Buffalo Bills. Smoot played in 11 games and started in 4, recording 16 tackles, 5 tackles for loss, and 1.5 sacks.

=== Jacksonville Jaguars (second stint) ===
On June 3, 2025, the Jaguars announced they had re-signed Smoot for a second stint. Smoot played in all 17 games for the Jaguars recording 20 tackles, 3 tackles for loss, and 2 sacks.

=== New York Giants ===
On October 13, 2026, Smoot was signed to the New York Giants practice squad.

== NFL career statistics ==
Legend
**Bold**	Career high

=== Regular season ===
Year	Team	Games		Tackles					Interceptions					Fumbles			
Year	Team	GP	GS	Comb	Solo	Ast	Sack	Sfty	Int	Yds	Lng	TD	PD	FF	FR	Yds	TD
2017	JAX	16	0	20	14	6	0	0	0	0	0	0	0	0	0	0	0
2018	JAX	8	0	4	3	1	0	0	0	0	0	0	0	0	0	0	0
2019	JAX	16	0	17	12	5	**6.0**	0	0	0	0	0	0	0	**1**	0	0
2020	JAX	16	7	25	21	4	5.5	0	0	0	0	0	0	**2**	0	0	0
2021	JAX	16	10	**36**	**22**	**14**	**6.0**	0	0	0	0	0	**3**	1	0	0	0
2022	JAX	15	0	21	14	7	5.0	0	0	0	0	0	2	1	0	0	0
2023	JAX	12	0	10	8	2	1.0	0	0	0	0	0	0	1	0	0	0
2024	BUF	11	4	16	12	4	1.5	0	0	0	0	0	1	**2**	0	0	0
2025	JAX	17	0	20	10	13	2.0	0	0	0	0	0	0	0	0	0	0
2026	NYG	1	0	2	1	1	1.0	0	0	0	0	0	0	0	0	0	0
Career		128	21	174	117	57	28.0	0	0	0	0	0	6	7	2	0	0

=== Postseason ===
Year	Team	Games		Tackles					Interceptions						Fumbles			
Year	Team	GP	GS	Cmb	Solo	Ast	Sck	Sfty	PD	Int	Yds	Avg	Lng	TD	FF	FR	Yds	TD
2017	JAX	3	0	**1**	**1**	0	0	0	0	0	0	0	0	0	0	0	0	0
2024	BUF	3	0	**1**	0	**1**	0	0	0	0	0	0	0	0	0	0	0	0
Total		3	0	1	1	0	0	0	0	0	0	0	0	0	0	0	0	0

== Personal life ==
On October 19, 2021, Smoot helped his wife Aumari deliver the couple's second child at home, after she fell on the way to the hospital. The couple has a two-year old son, Ahmir.
