= 2016 Rutgers Scarlet Knights football team =

American college football season

2016 Rutgers Scarlet Knights football
- Conference: Big Ten Conference
- East Division
- Record: 2–10 (0–9 Big Ten)
- Head coach: Chris Ash (1st season)
- Offensive coordinator: Drew Mehringer (1st season)
- Offensive scheme: Power spread
- Defensive coordinator: Jay Niemann (1st season)
- Base defense: Multiple
- Captains: Chris Muller; Derrick Nelson; Darius Hamilton; Julian Pinnix-Odrick
- Home stadium: High Point Solutions Stadium

2016 Big Ten Conference football standings
	Conf.			Overall
Team	W		L	W		L
East Division
No. 7 Penn State xy$	8	–	1	11	–	3
No. 6 Ohio State x^	8	–	1	11	–	2
No. 10 Michigan	7	–	2	10	–	3
Indiana	4	–	5	6	–	7
Maryland	3	–	6	6	–	7
Michigan State	1	–	8	3	–	9
Rutgers	0	–	9	2	–	10
West Division
No. 9 Wisconsin xy	7	–	2	11	–	3
Iowa	6	–	3	8	–	5
Nebraska	6	–	3	9	–	4
Minnesota	5	–	4	9	–	4
Northwestern	5	–	4	7	–	6
Illinois	2	–	7	3	–	9
Purdue	1	–	8	3	–	9
Championship: Penn State 38, Wisconsin 31
^ – College Football Playoff participant; $ – Conference champion; x – Division champion/co-champions; y – Championship game participant; Rankings from AP Poll

The 2016 Rutgers Scarlet Knights football team represented Rutgers University in the 2016 NCAA Division I FBS football season. It was the Scarlet Knights' third season as a member of the Big Ten Conference, and a member of the East Division. The team was led by Chris Ash, who is in his first season. Rutgers played its home games at High Point Solutions Stadium in Piscataway, New Jersey. They finished the season 2–10, 0–9 in Big Ten play to finish in last place in the East Division.

== Schedule ==
Rutgers announced its 2016 football schedule on July 11, 2013. The 2016 schedule consisted of 7 home and 5 away games in the regular season. The Scarlet Knights hosted Big Ten foes Illinois, Indiana, Iowa, Michigan, and Penn State, and traveled to Maryland, Michigan State, Minnesota, and Ohio State.

The team hosted two of the three non–conference games against Howard Bison from the Mid-Eastern Athletic Conference, the New Mexico Lobos from the Mountain West Conference, and Washington Huskies from the Pac-12 Conference (Pac-12).

Date	Time	Opponent	Site	TV	Result	Attendance
September 3	2:00 pm	at No. 14 Washington*	Husky Stadium; Seattle, WA	P12N	L 13–48	58,460
September 10	12:00 pm	Howard*	High Point Solutions Stadium; Piscataway, NJ	BTN	W 52–14	45,245
September 17	12:00 pm	New Mexico*	High Point Solutions Stadium; Piscataway, NJ	ESPNews	W 37–28	39,680
September 24	12:00 pm	Iowa	High Point Solutions Stadium; Piscataway, NJ	ESPN2	L 7–14	44,061
October 1	12:00 pm	at No. 2 Ohio State	Ohio Stadium; Columbus, OH	BTN	L 0–58	105,830
October 8	7:00 pm	No. 4 Michigan	High Point Solutions Stadium; Piscataway, NJ	ESPN2	L 0–78	53,292
October 15	12:00 pm	Illinois^{†}	High Point Solutions Stadium; Piscataway, NJ	ESPNews	L 7–24	42,640
October 22	12:00 pm	at Minnesota	TCF Bank Stadium; Minneapolis, MN	ESPNU	L 32–34	46,096
November 5	12:00 pm	Indiana	High Point Solutions Stadium; Piscataway, NJ	BTN	L 27–33	37,345
November 12	12:00 pm	at Michigan State	Spartan Stadium; East Lansing, MI	BTN	L 0–49	73,701
November 19	8:00 pm	No. 9 Penn State	High Point Solutions Stadium; Piscataway, NJ	BTN	L 0–39	51,366
November 26	12:00 pm	at Maryland	Maryland Stadium; College Park, MD	ESPNews	L 13–31	30,220
*Non-conference game; ^{†}Homecoming; Rankings from AP Poll released prior to the game; All times are in Eastern time

== Game summaries ==
=== At Washington ===
	1	2	3	4	Total
Scarlet Knights	0	3	0	10	13
#14 Huskies	24	10	14	0	48

=== Howard ===
	1	2	3	4	Total
Bison	14	0	0	0	14
Scarlet Knights	7	7	21	17	52

=== New Mexico ===
	1	2	3	4	Total
Lobos	21	0	0	7	28
Scarlet Knights	7	21	3	6	37

=== Iowa ===
	1	2	3	4	Total
Hawkeyes	0	7	0	7	14
Scarlet Knights	0	0	0	7	7

=== At Ohio State ===
	1	2	3	4	Total
Scarlet Knights	0	0	0	0	0
#2 Buckeyes	6	24	21	7	58

=== Michigan ===
	1	2	3	4	Total
#4 Wolverines	14	29	14	21	78
Scarlet Knights	0	0	0	0	0

After its game against Ohio State, Rutgers returned home to face Michigan in Michigan's first road game of the season. Michigan defeated Rutgers 49–16 in the previous meeting.

Michigan won in a historic blowout, 78–0. Michigan opened the scoring in the first quarter via a four-yard touchdown run from Ty Isaac. Michigan added to its lead via a 30-yard touchdown pass from Speight to Chesson. Michigan added 29 points in the second quarter via a seven-yard touchdown run from Peppers, two one-yard touchdown runs from Hill, a two-point conversion Garrett Moores rush, and a four-yard touchdown run from Peppers, which made the score 43–0 in favor of Michigan at half-time. Michigan added 14 points in the third quarter via an 11-yard touchdown pass from John O'Korn to Hill, and a 15-yard touchdown run from Karan Higdon. Michigan added 21 points in the fourth quarter via a 13-yard touchdown run from Bobby Henderson, a 44-yard touchdown run from Higdon, and a 34-yard touchdown run from Isaac.

The game was a statistical domination for Michigan. Michigan accumulated 600 yards of offense and eleven touchdowns (nine rushing, two passing); the nine rushing touchdowns tied for the most in modern program history. Khalid Hill recorded three touchdown scores, making him the first Michigan player with three or more scores since Chesson had four in 2015 against Indiana. Michigan improved to 6–0 for the first time since 2011 and recorded its first shutout since the previous season against Northwestern. Michigan's defense held Rutgers to only 39 total yards, two first downs, 14 three-and-outs and 0-for-17 on third down. Michigan recorded its largest margin of victory—during either conference or non-conference play—since it defeated Chicago 85–0 in 1939. This was also the largest margin of victory in any Big Ten game since the same Michigan victory over Chicago. The defeat was Rutgers' worst loss since an 82–0 loss to Princeton in 1888.

=== Illinois ===
	1	2	3	4	Total
Fighting Illini	0	7	10	7	24
Scarlet Knights	0	0	0	7	7

=== At Minnesota ===
	1	2	3	4	Total
Scarlet Knights	3	7	13	9	32
Golden Gophers	21	0	10	3	34

=== Indiana ===
	1	2	3	4	Total
Hoosiers	13	0	13	7	33
Scarlet Knights	10	7	7	3	27

=== At Michigan State ===
	1	2	3	4	Total
Scarlet Knights	0	0	0	0	0
Spartans	21	14	14	0	49

=== Penn State ===
	1	2	3	4	Total
#9 Nittany Lions	6	3	16	14	39
Scarlet Knights	0	0	0	0	0

Penn State piled up 39 points despite the game taking place during an ice storm and limited Rutgers to 87 yards, 5 first downs, and 1-14 third down conversions, managing only 1 yard in the entire second half.

=== At Maryland ===
	1	2	3	4	Total
Scarlet Knights	0	7	6	0	13
Terrapins	14	7	7	3	31

== Roster ==
2016 Rutgers Scarlet Knights football team roster
Players
Coaches
Offense

Pos.	#	Name	Class
WR	1	Janarion Grant	Sr
WR	2	Ahmir Mitchell	Fr
WR	3	Jawuan Harris	Fr
RB	4	Trey Sneed	Fr
QB	5	Chris Laviano	Jr
WR	6	Mohamed Jabbie	Fr
RB	7	Robert Martin	Jr
RB	8	Josh Hicks	Jr
QB	11	Hayden Rettig	Jr
QB	12	Zach Allen	Jr
WR	13	Carlton Agudosi	Sr
QB	14	Tylin Oden	Fr
QB	15	Jack Clements	Fr
WR	16	Christopher Parker	Fr
QB	17	Giovanni Rescigno	So
QB	18	Michael Dare	Fr
QB	19	Troy Anthony	Sr
RB	20	Devan Carter	Jr
WR	21	Jelani Garvin	Fr
WR	22	Prince Taylor	Fr
WR	23	Dacoven Bailey	Fr
RB	24	Charles Snorweah	Fr
WR	26	Ahmed Bah	Fr
WR	27	McDerby Ceneus	Fr
RB	28	Aslan Pugh	Fr
RB	32	Justin Goodwin	Sr
WR	41	Thomas Koprowski	Fr
TE	42	Nick Arcidiacono	Sr
TE	43	George Behr	So
WR	46	Davante McDuffie	Jr
OL	54	Kamaal Seymour	Fr
OL	55	Michael Maietti	Fr
OL	60	Dorian Miller	Jr
OL	61	Mike Lonsdorf	Fr
OL	63	Jim Onulak	Fr
OL	64	Skiy Pyrame	Fr
OL	65	Tariq Cole	So
OL	66	Nick Krimin	Fr
OL	69	Derrick Nelson (C)	Sr
OL	70	Chris Muller (C)	Sr
OL	71	Marcus Applefield	So
OL	72	Manny Taylor	Fr
OL	73	Jonah Jackson	Fr
OL	74	Sam Howson	Fr
OL	75	Zach Venesky	Fr
OL	77	J. J. Denman	Sr
OL	79	Zack Heeman	So
WR	80	Alex Schoen	Jr
TE	81	Matt Flanagan	Jr
WR	82	Ntwademela Perry	So
WR	83	Rashad Blunt	Fr
WR	84	John Tsimis	Jr
TE	86	Nakia Griffin-Stewart	Fr
WR	87	Vance Matthews	Sr
WR	88	Andre Patton	Sr
TE	89	Jerome Washington	So

Defense

Pos.	#	Name	Class
DB	2	Kiy Hester	So
LB	5	Ronnie James	So
DL	7	Elorm Lumor	Fr
DB	9	Saquan Hampton	So
DB	10	Blessuan Austin	So
DB	11	Isaiah Wharton	So
DL	12	Myles Nash	Jr
LB	14	Solomon Manning	Fr
LB	15	Trevor Morris	So
DB	17	K. J. Gray	Fr
DB	18	Damon Hayes	Fr
DB	20	Marcus Parker	Sr
DB	21	Ross Douglas	Jr
DL	22	Quanzell Lambert	Sr
DB	25	Jarius Adams	So
LB	26	Deonte Roberts	So
DB	27	Kobe Marfo	So
LB	28	Najee Clayton	So
DB	29	Lawrence Stevens	Fr
LB	30	Andre Hunt	Jr
DB	31	Anthony Cioffi	Sr
LB	33	Greg Jones	Sr
LB	34	Talib Abdur-Ra'oof	So
LB	35	Eric Margolis	So
LB	36	T. J. Taylor	Jr
LB	37	Max Anthony	Fr
LB	38	Jim Brady	Fr
DB	39	Sandy Anya	Jr
DB	40	Brian Chase	Fr
LB	40	Kevin Marquez	Sr
DB	43	D'Won Walker	Fr
LB	44	Tyreek Maddox-Williams	Fr
DB	45	Dylan Rogers	Fr
LB	47	Isaiah Johnson	Sr
LB	49	Brandon Russell	So
DL	50	Julius Turner	Fr
DL	51	Sebastian Joseph-Day	Jr
DL	53	Julian Pinnix-Odrick (C)	Sr
LB	55	Austin Rosa	Fr
LB	56	Rashawn Battle	Fr
DL	58	Kemoko Turay	Jr
DL	59	Darnell Davis	Jr
DL	67	Kenneth Roman	Fr
DL	75	Darius Hamilton (C)	Sr
DL	90	Ron'Dell Carter	Fr
DL	92	Eric Wiafe	So
DL	93	Jason Griggs	Fr
DL	95	Jon Bateky	So
DL	96	Willington Previlon	Fr
DL	98	Jimmy Hogan	So
DL	99	Kevin Wilkins	So

Special teams

Pos.	#	Name	Class
LS	62	Matthew Sportelli	Fr
LS	85	Alan Lucy	Jr
P	94	Michael Cintron	So
PK	97	Jared Smolar	Fr
PK	98	David Bonagura	Jr
P	99	Tim Gleeson	Sr
P	99	Gavin Haggerty	Fr

Head coach

- Chris Ash

Coordinators/assistant coaches

- Drew Mehringer (Offensive Coordinator)
- Jay Niemann (Defensive Coordinator)
- Vince Okruch (Special Teams Coordinator)
- A. J. Blazek (Offensive Line)
- Shane Burnham (Defensive Line)
- Bill Busch (Defensive Backs)
- Aaron Henry (Assistant Defensive Backs)
- Zak Kuhr (Running Backs)
- Jafar Williams (Wide Receivers)
- Kenny Parker (Head Football Strength and Conditioning)
- Sean Barowski (Defensive Assistant)
- Collin Bauer (Defensive Assistant)
- David Galante (Offensive Assistant)
- Mark Rosenbaum (Offensive Assistant)

Legend

- (C) Team captain
- (S) Suspended
- (I) Ineligible
- Injured
- Redshirt

Roster
Last update: November 23, 2016

== Awards and honors ==
Weekly

Weekly Awards
Player	Award	Date Awarded	Ref.
Janarion Grant	Big Ten Special Teams Player of the Week	September 5, 2016	

All-Conference

All-Big Ten
Player	Selection	Ref.
Tariq Cole	Honorable Mention (Coaches)	
Blessuan Austin	Honorable Mention (Media)	
