= 2016 Michigan State Spartans football team =

American college football season

2016 Michigan State Spartans football
- Conference: Big Ten Conference
- East Division
- Record: 3–9 (1–8 Big Ten)
- Head coach: Mark Dantonio (10th season)
- Co-offensive coordinators: Dave Warner (4th season); Jim Bollman (4th season)
- Offensive scheme: Multiple
- Co-defensive coordinators: Harlon Barnett (2nd season); Mike Tressel (2nd season)
- Base defense: 4–3
- Captain: 3: Tyler O'Connor; Riley Bullough; Demetrius Cox
- Home stadium: Spartan Stadium

2016 Big Ten Conference football standings
	Conf.			Overall
Team	W		L	W		L
East Division
No. 7 Penn State xy$	8	–	1	11	–	3
No. 6 Ohio State x^	8	–	1	11	–	2
No. 10 Michigan	7	–	2	10	–	3
Indiana	4	–	5	6	–	7
Maryland	3	–	6	6	–	7
Michigan State	1	–	8	3	–	9
Rutgers	0	–	9	2	–	10
West Division
No. 9 Wisconsin xy	7	–	2	11	–	3
Iowa	6	–	3	8	–	5
Nebraska	6	–	3	9	–	4
Minnesota	5	–	4	9	–	4
Northwestern	5	–	4	7	–	6
Illinois	2	–	7	3	–	9
Purdue	1	–	8	3	–	9
Championship: Penn State 38, Wisconsin 31
^ – College Football Playoff participant; $ – Conference champion; x – Division champion/co-champions; y – Championship game participant; Rankings from AP Poll

The 2016 Michigan State Spartans football team represented Michigan State University during the 2016 NCAA Division I FBS football season. The Spartans played in the East Division of the Big Ten Conference and played their home games at Spartan Stadium in East Lansing, Michigan. They were led by head coach Mark Dantonio, who was in his tenth season. They finished the season 3–9, 1–8 in Big Ten play to finish in sixth place in the East Division.

The season marked a major disappointment for the Spartans as it was their first losing season under Dantonio and the school's first losing season since 2006. As a result, the team was not bowl eligible. The Spartans had only lost five games in the three prior years combined, but had reached five losses by their seventh game. This was the worst record for a defending power conference champion until Florida State in 2024, who went 2–10.

== Offseason ==
=== 2016 NFL draft ===
Round	Pick	Team	Player	Position
1	8	Tennessee Titans	Jack Conklin	Offense Tackle
3	75	Oakland Raiders	Shilique Calhoun	Defensive End
4	100	Oakland Raiders	Connor Cook	Quarterback
6	213	San Francisco 49ers	Aaron Burbridge	Wide receiver
7	224	San Diego Chargers	Donavon Clark	Offense Guard

=== 2016 CFL draft ===
Round	Overall Pick	Team	Player	Position
2	17	Edmonton Eskimos	Arjen Colquhoun	Cornerback

=== Undrafted NFL free agents ===
Team	Player	Position
Cincinnati Bengals	Darien Harris	Linebacker
Dallas Cowboys	Arjen Colquhoun	Cornerback
Houston Texans	Joel Heath	Defensive End
New York Jets	Lawrence Thomas	Defensive End
New Orleans Saints	Jack Allen	Center
Baltimore Ravens	Trevon Pendleton	Fullback
Seattle Seahawks	DeAnthony Arnett	Wide receiver
Baltimore Ravens	Taybor Pepper	Long Snapper
Green Bay Packers	RJ Williamson	Safety

=== Recruiting class ===
College recruiting (2016)
Name	Hometown	School	Height	Weight	Commit date
Josh King; DE	Darien, IL	Hinsdale South	6 ft 6 in (1.98 m)	235 lb (107 kg)	Jun 5, 2016
Josh King; DE	Recruit ratings: Scout: Rivals: 247Sports: ESPN: (82)				
Auston Robertson; DE	Fort Wayne, IN	Wayne	6 ft 4 in (1.93 m)	258 lb (117 kg)	Mar 30, 2016
Auston Robertson; DE	Recruit ratings: Scout: Rivals: 247Sports: ESPN: (82)				
Donnie Corley; WR	Detroit, MI	Martin Luther King	6 ft 3 in (1.91 m)	187 lb (85 kg)	Jan 9, 2016
Donnie Corley; WR	Recruit ratings: Scout: Rivals: 247Sports: ESPN: (81)				
Justin Layne; WR	Cleveland, OH	Benedictine	6 ft 2 in (1.88 m)	180 lb (82 kg)	Apr 25, 2015
Justin Layne; WR	Recruit ratings: Scout: Rivals: 247Sports: ESPN: (81)				
Naquan Jones; DT	Evanston, IL	Evanston Township	6 ft 4 in (1.93 m)	320 lb (150 kg)	Dec 1, 2015
Naquan Jones; DT	Recruit ratings: Scout: Rivals: 247Sports: ESPN: (80)				
Trishton Jackson; WR	West Bloomfield, MI	West Bloomfield	6 ft 3 in (1.91 m)	187 lb (85 kg)	Jun 18, 2015
Trishton Jackson; WR	Recruit ratings: Scout: Rivals: 247Sports: ESPN: (78)				
Cameron Chambers; WR	Sicklerville, NJ	Timber Creek	6 ft 3 in (1.91 m)	202 lb (92 kg)	Aug 1, 2014
Cameron Chambers; WR	Recruit ratings: Scout: Rivals: 247Sports: ESPN: (80)				
Demetric Vance; S	Detroit, MI	Cass Tech	6 ft 2 in (1.88 m)	195 lb (88 kg)	May 13, 2015
Demetric Vance; S	Recruit ratings: Scout: Rivals: 247Sports: ESPN: (77)				
Messiah DeWeaver; QB	Dayton, OH	Wayne	6 ft 4 in (1.93 m)	215 lb (98 kg)	Apr 23, 2015
Messiah DeWeaver; QB	Recruit ratings: Scout: Rivals: 247Sports: ESPN: (80)				
Mike Panasiuk; DT	Roselle, IL	Lake Park	6 ft 3 in (1.91 m)	309 lb (140 kg)	Jun 8, 2015
Mike Panasiuk; DT	Recruit ratings: Scout: Rivals: 247Sports: ESPN: (80)				
Kenney Lyke; S	Palatine, IL	Fremd	6 ft 2 in (1.88 m)	185 lb (84 kg)	May 22, 2015
Kenney Lyke; S	Recruit ratings: Scout: Rivals: 247Sports: ESPN: (76)				
Brandon Randle; LB	Battle Creek, MI	Battle Creek	6 ft 2 in (1.88 m)	215 lb (98 kg)	Jun 14, 2015
Brandon Randle; LB	Recruit ratings: Scout: Rivals: 247Sports: ESPN: (73)				
Thiyo Lukusa; OT	Wayne, NJ	DePaul	6 ft 5 in (1.96 m)	300 lb (140 kg)	May 14, 2015
Thiyo Lukusa; OT	Recruit ratings: Scout: Rivals: 247Sports: ESPN: (80)				
Noah Davis; TE	Cincinnati, OH	St. Xavier	6 ft 5 in (1.96 m)	234 lb (106 kg)	Apr 27, 2015
Noah Davis; TE	Recruit ratings: Scout: Rivals: 247Sports: ESPN: (78)				
Austin Andrews; CB	Columbus, OH	St. Francis deSales	6 ft 0 in (1.83 m)	180 lb (82 kg)	Feb 3, 2016
Austin Andrews; CB	Recruit ratings: Scout: Rivals: 247Sports: ESPN: (76)				
Joe Bachie; LB	Berea, OH	Midpark	6 ft 2 in (1.88 m)	219 lb (99 kg)	Apr 25, 2015
Joe Bachie; LB	Recruit ratings: Scout: Rivals: 247Sports: ESPN: (72)				
A. J. Arcuri; OT	Powell, OH	Olentangy Liberty	6 ft 6 in (1.98 m)	256 lb (116 kg)	Jul 27, 2015
A. J. Arcuri; OT	Recruit ratings: Scout: Rivals: 247Sports: ESPN: (70)				
Matthew Allen; C	Hinsdale, IL	Hinsdale	6 ft 3 in (1.91 m)	269 lb (122 kg)	Feb 26, 2015
Matthew Allen; C	Recruit ratings: Scout: Rivals: 247Sports: ESPN: (75)				
Luke Campbell; OT	Lewis Center, OH	Olentangy	6 ft 4 in (1.93 m)	275 lb (125 kg)	Jan 24, 2016
Luke Campbell; OT	Recruit ratings: Scout: Rivals: 247Sports: ESPN: (72)				
Matthew Coghlin; K	Cincinnati, OH	Moeller	5 ft 10 in (1.78 m)	184 lb (83 kg)	Jun 24, 2015
Matthew Coghlin; K	Recruit ratings: Scout: Rivals: 247Sports: ESPN: (75)				
Overall recruit ranking: Scout: 15 Rivals: 18 247Sports: 17 ESPN: 22
Note: In many cases, Scout, Rivals, 247Sports, On3, and ESPN may conflict in their listings of height and weight.; In these cases, the average was taken. ESPN grades are on a 100-point scale.; Sources: "2016 Michigan State Football Commitment List". Rivals.; "2016 Player Commits – Michigan State". ESPN.; "2016 Team Ranking". Rivals.com.; "Michigan State 2016 Football Commits". 247Sports.

=== Departures ===
The Spartans suffered heavy losses on the defensive line in the off-season. It was announced in April that Sophomores Craig Evans and Montez Sweat would be leaving the team for personal reasons. The following month, Damon Knox declined to take a sixth year of eligibility in order to pursue a career in law enforcement. In late August, RS Freshman Enoch Smith Jr. and Sophomore Cassius Peat would transfer out; Peat would transfer to East Arizona, and Smith would transfer to Butler Community College in Kansas.

== Coaching staff ==
Name	Position	Joined staff
Mark Dantonio	Head coach	2007
Harlon Barnett	Assistant head coach / Co-defensive coordinator / Defensive Backs	2007
Dave Warner	Co-offensive Coordinator / Running Backs	2007
Jim Bollman	Co-offensive Coordinator / Tight Ends	2013
Mike Tressel	Co-defensive coordinator / Linebackers	2007
Brad Salem	Quarterbacks / recruiting coordinator	2010
Terrence Samuel	Wide receivers	2011
Mark Staten	offensive line	2007
Ron Burton	Defensive line	2013
Mark Snyder	Linebackers / Special Teams	2015

== Roster ==
2016 Michigan State Spartans Football
Quarterback: 6 Damion Terry – junior (6'3, 238); 7 Tyler O'Connor – senior (6'3, 225); 10 Messiah deWeaver – freshman (6'4, 212); 11 Colar Kuhns – (redshirt) sophomore (6'1, 216); 14 Brian Lewerke – (redshirt) freshman (6'3, 200); Tailback: 3 LJ Scott – sophomore (6'0, 238); 22 Delton Williams – senior (6'1, 230); 24 Gerald Holmes – junior (6'0, 220); 28 Madre London – (redshirt) sophomore (6'1, 220); 29 Malik Smith – freshman (5'9, 215); 32 Nick Tompkins – senior (5'9, 180); 37 Corey Pryor – freshman (5'10, 193); Fullback: 40 Lucas Collin – sophomore (6'0, 232); 41 Reid Burton – freshman (6'0, 223); 45 Prescott Line – graduate (6'0, 253); Wide receiver: 8 Trishton Jackson – freshman (6'3, 190); 9 Donnie Corley – freshman (6'3, 185); 12 R.J. Shelton – senior (5'11, 205); 13 Robert Aiello – junior (6'2, 189); 13 Justin Layne – freshman (6'2, 180); 15 Brandon Sowards – (redshirt) sophomore (6'0, 190); 18 Felton Davis III – sophomore (6'4, 198); 20 Davis Lewandowski – (redshirt) freshman (6'0, 199); 21 Cam Chambers – freshman (6'3, 207); 22 Paul Andrie – senior (6'2, 187); 25 Darrell Stewart Jr. – (redshirt) freshman (6'1, 208); 26 Austin Wolfe – junior (6'0, 175); 33 Frank Epitropoulos – senior (6'1, 206); 36 Sinclair Farinholt – (redshirt) freshman (6'0, 183); 84 Brock Makaric – junior (6'2, 188); 85 Khylin Barton – freshman (6'1, 184); 86 Matt Macksood – senior (5'11, 195); 87 Edward Barksdale III – senior (6'2, 200); 88 Monty Madaris – senior (6'1, 202); Tight end: 11 Jamal Lyles – senior (6'3, 265); 42 Hussein Kadry – (redshirt) junior (6'3, 222); 81 Matt Sokol – (redshirt) sophomore (6'5, 250); 82 Josiah Price – senior (6'4, 260); 84 Noah Davis – freshman (6'4, 258)	Offensive lineman: 55 Miguel Machado – OL – senior (6'6, 302); 57 Collin Caflisch – OG – (redshirt) freshman (6'4, 293); 58 Devyn Salmon – C – junior (6'1, 315); 59 David Beedle – OT – (redshirt) sophomore (6'5, 310); 60 Casey Schreiner – OG – (redshirt) sophomore (6'3, 316); 61 Cole Chewins – OT – (redshirt) freshman (6'7, 265); 62 Luke Campbell – OL – freshman (6'5, 280); 63 Noah Listermann – OT – (redshirt) freshman (6'7, 316); 64 Brandon Clemons – OG – senior (6'3, 303); 65 Brian Allen – OL – junior (6'2, 303); 66 Matt Allen – OL – freshman (6'3, 291); 67 Bryce Wilker – C – (redshirt) freshman (6'4, 285); 68 Jeremy Schram – OL – (redshirt) sophomore (6'4, 322); 70 Tyler Higby – OG – (redshirt) freshman (6'4, 318); 71 Chase Gianacakos – OL – (redshirt) sophomore (6'6, 301); 72 Thiyo Lukusa – OL – freshman (6'5, 335); 73 Dennis Finley – OT – junior (6'6, 282); 75 Benny McGowan – OG – senior (6'3, 333); 76 A. J. Arcuri – OL – freshman (6'6, 260); 77 Nick Padla – OL – (redshirt) sophomore (6'6, 302); 79 Kodi Kieler – OL – senior (6'6, 310); Defensive line: 4 Malik McDowell – DL – junior (6'6, 280); 12 Josh King – DE – freshman (6'6, 267); 32 Cassius Peat – DL – (redshirt) freshman (6'3, 270); 41 Gerald Owens – DL – (redshirt) sophomore (6'2, 298); 48 Kenny Willekes – DE – (redshirt) freshman (6'3, 226); 51 Kyonta Stallworth – DL – (redshirt) freshman (6'3, 279); 52 Dillon Alexander – DE – (redshirt) sophomore (6'3, 240); 56 Enoch Smith Jr. – DL – (redshirt) sophomore (6'2, 294); 83 Mufi Hunt – DE – freshman (6'6, 255); 85 Evan Jones – DE – senior (6'5, 246); 86 Drew Beesley – DL – freshman (6'2, 231); 89 Gabe Sherrod – DL – graduate (6'3, 250); 91 Robert Bowers – DE – (redshirt) sophomore (6'4, 256); 92 Kevin Williams – DT – graduate (6'2, 281); 93 Naquan Jones – DT – freshman (6'4, 320); 94 Auston Robertson – DE – freshman (6'4, 275); 96 Mike Panasiuk – DT – freshman (6'3, 309); 97 Justice Alexander – DE – (redshirt) freshman (6'5, 243); 98 Demetrius Cooper – DE – junior (6'5, 252); 99 Raequan Williams – DL – (redshirt) freshman (6'4, 307)	Linebacker: 5 Andrew Dowell – sophomore (6'0, 217); 17 Tyriq Thompson – (redshirt) freshman (6'1, 225); 23 Chris Frey – junior (6'2, 222); 26 Brandon Randle – freshman (6'2, 217); 30 Riley Bullough – senior (6'2, 230); 31 T.J. Harrell – (redshirt) sophomore (6'1, 205); 33 Jon Reschke – junior (6'2, 225); 35 Joe Bachie – freshman (6'2, 236); 38 Byron Bullough – (redshirt) sophomore (6'1, 224); 43 Ed Davis – senior (6'3, 225); 49 Shane Jones – junior (6'1, 230); 50 Sean Harrington – junior (6'3, 212); 53 Peter Fisk – freshman (6'1, 215); Defensive backs: 2 Darian Hicks – CB – senior (5'10, 180); 7 Demetrious Cox – DB – senior (6'1, 198); 9 Montae Nicholson – S – junior (6'2, 220); 10 Matt Morrissey – S – (redshirt) sophomore (6'2, 201); 11 Demetric Vance – S – freshman (6'2, 200); 13 Vayante Copeland – CB – (redshirt) sophomore (6'0, 197); 14 Kenney Lyke – S – freshman (6'2, 182); 15 Tyson Smith – CB – sophomore (5'10, 173); 16 Austin Andrews – CB – freshman (5'11, 183); 19 Josh Butler – CB – (redshirt) freshman (5'11, 173); 20 Jalen Watts-Jackson – S – (redshirt) sophomore (5'11, 186); 27 Khari Willis – S – sophomore (5'11, 210); 28 David Dowell – S – (redshirt) freshman (6'0, 193); 34 Drake Martinez – CB – junior (6'2, 210); 35 Nick Krumm – S – (redshirt) freshman (5'11, 202); 36 Kaleel Gaines – CB – (redshirt) freshman (6'0, 187); 42 Drew Beesley – S – senior (5'11, 195); 44 Grayson Miller – S – sophomore (6'3, 212); Specialists: 4 Michael Geiger – K – senior (5'8, 183); 25 Jake Hartbarger – P – (redshirt) sophomore (6'4, 207); 45 Ryan Armour – LS – freshman (6'0, 206); 47 Bradley Robinson – LS – freshman (6'2, 228); 97 Brett Scanlon – K – (redshirt) junior (5'11, 215); 98 Drew Beesley – K – freshman (5'9, 205); 99 Kevin Cronin – K – senior (6'1, 215)

== Schedule ==
Michigan State announced its 2016 football schedule on July 11, 2013. The 2016 schedule consists of seven home and five road games in the regular season. The Spartans will host Big Ten foes Michigan, Northwestern, Ohio State, Rutgers, and Wisconsin, and will travel to Illinois, Indiana, Maryland, and Penn State. The team will host two of the three non–conference games, versus BYU and Notre Dame, both Independent, and FCS-school Furman from the Southern Conference.

Date	Time	Opponent	Rank	Site	TV	Result	Attendance
September 2	7:00 p.m.	Furman*	No. 12	Spartan Stadium; East Lansing, MI	BTN	W 28–13	74,516
September 17	7:30 p.m.	at No. 18 Notre Dame*	No. 12	Notre Dame Stadium; South Bend, IN (rivalry)	NBC	W 36–28	80,795
September 24	12:00 p.m.	No. 11 Wisconsin	No. 8	Spartan Stadium; East Lansing, MI	BTN	L 6–30	75,505
October 1	8:00 p.m.	at Indiana	No. 17	Memorial Stadium; Bloomington, IN (rivalry)	BTN	L 21–24 ^{OT}	43,971
October 8	3:30 p.m.	BYU*		Spartan Stadium; East Lansing, MI	ABC/ESPN2	L 14–31	74,214
October 15	3:30 p.m.	Northwestern^{†}		Spartan Stadium; East Lansing, MI	BTN	L 40–54	75,625
October 22	7:30 p.m.	at Maryland		Maryland Stadium; College Park, MD	BTN	L 17–28	41,235
October 29	12:00 p.m.	No. 2 Michigan		Spartan Stadium; East Lansing, MI (rivalry)	ESPN	L 23–32	75,802
November 5	12:00 p.m.	at Illinois		Memorial Stadium; Champaign, IL	ESPNews	L 27–31	47,144
November 12	12:00 p.m.	Rutgers		Spartan Stadium; East Lansing, MI	BTN	W 49–0	73,701
November 19	12:00 p.m.	No. 2 Ohio State		Spartan Stadium; East Lansing, MI	ESPN	L 16–17	73,303
November 26	3:30 p.m.	at No. 8 Penn State		Beaver Stadium; University Park, PA (rivalry)	ESPN	L 12–45	97,418
*Non-conference game; ^{†}Homecoming; Rankings from AP Poll released prior to game; All times are in Eastern time

Schedule source:

== Game summaries ==
=== Furman ===
Furman at No. 12 Michigan State

Team	1	2	3	4	Total
Furman	0	3	3	7	13
• No. 12 Michigan State	7	7	7	7	28

- Date: September 2, 2016
- Location:
  Spartan Stadium
  East Lansing, MI
- Game start: 7:04 p.m.
- Elapsed time: 3:13
- Game attendance: 74,516
- Game weather: 70 °F (21 °C), Wind: 7 MPH NE, Partly Cloudy
- Referee: Mike Conlin
- TV announcers (BTN): Justin Kutcher (Play-by-Play), Jim Miller (Analyst), Johnny Kane (Sideline)

Scoring summary
1	11:19	MSU	LJ Scott 1-yard run (Michael Geiger kick)	7–0 MSU
2	03:19	MSU	Felton Davis III 13-yard pass from Tyler O'Connor (Michael Geiger kick)	14–0 MSU
2	00:15	FUR	Jon Croft Hollingsworth 20-yard field goal	14–3 MSU
3	07:34	FUR	Jon Croft Hollingsworth 23-yard field goal	14–6 MSU
3	04:26	MSU	Josiah Price 21-yard pass from Tyler O'Connor (Michael Geiger kick)	21–6 MSU
4	13: 37	FUR	Antonio Wilcox 6-yard run (Jon Croft Hollingsworth kick)	21–13 MSU
4	04:55	MSU	Jamal Lyles 12-yard pass from Tyler O'Connor (Michael Geiger kick)	28–13 MSU

The Spartans opened their 2016 season under the lights against FCS opponent Furman, the last time the Spartans will play an FCS opponent in the foreseeable future as the Big Ten has agreed to no longer schedule FCS opponents following this season.

The Spartans came out strong, scoring on their opening drive as L.J. Scott carried the ball four times for 33 yards, capping the drive with a one-yard touchdown run to give Michigan State an early 7–0 lead. The remainder of the quarter was a defensive struggle as both teams failed to move the ball effectively. Michigan State had an opportunity to extend their lead late in the quarter, however, Michael Geiger missed on a 43-yard field goal attempt, and the score remained 7–0 Michigan State heading into the second quarter.

Both offenses continued to struggle during the 2nd quarter, as neither offense could put a successful drive together until midway through the quarter when Michigan State completed an eight-play, 57-yard drive which culminated with a 13-yard Tyler O'Connor touchdown pass to Felton Davis III to take the lead 14–0. Furman would respond with a field goal following a 13-play, 73-yard drive to finally get on the board. At halftime, MSU led 14–3.

Furman received the ball to begin the second half and drove to the MSU 33-yard line before Jon Croft Hollingsworth missed a 50-yard field goal attempt. The Spartans turned the ball back over to Furman via a fumble by Darrell Stewart Jr. on the very first play of next possession. Furman took advantage and kicked a 23-yard field goal, reducing MSU's lead to 14–6. MSU responded with a five play, 58-yard touchdown drive capped by a Josiah Price 21-yard touchdown catch from Tyler O'Connor extending the Spartan lead to 21–6 heading into the fourth quarter.

Furman answered on an Antonio Wilcox six-yard touchdown run capping off an 11 play, 73-yard drive. The Spartans responded throwing an interception on their first possession of the fourth quarter, giving the Paladins favorable field position and an opportunity to tie the game. However, Andrew Dowell picked off P.J. Blazejowski on the first play of the possession to give the Spartans the ball right back. The Michigan State offense made up for the turnover by going on a 12 play, 60-yard drive, with Tyler O'Connor throwing a 12-yard touchdown pass to Jamal Lyles to give the Spartans a 28–13 lead. Furman turned the ball over on downs their next possession and Michigan State would run out the clock to end the game.

With the win, Michigan State won their eighth straight season opener and remained undefeated in home-openers under Mark Dantonio (10–0). Josiah Price recorded his 17th career touchdown reception, moving him up to seventh on the all time touchdown reception list in program history. Senior wide receiver R.J. Shelton, who came into the game as the starting receiver for the Spartans, was taken out of the game early after a punt return due to a tweaked hamstring; this was mainly done as a precaution. Starting linebacker Jon Reschke was also sidelined due to an apparent hand injury and did not play at all; both injuries were said to be minor. The Spartans played an unusually sloppy game, committing two turnovers and 10 penalties for 120 yards, many of which stunted momentum on several offensive possessions and extended several Furman offensive possessions. Tyler O'Connor completed 13 of 18 passes for 190 yards and three TDs. L.J. Scott rushed for 105 yards on 20 carries with one touchdown. Senior wide-out Monty Madaris caught five passes for 85 yards to lead the team in receiving.

=== Notre Dame ===
No. 12 Michigan State at No. 18 Notre Dame
(Megaphone Trophy)

Team	1	2	3	4	Total
• No. 12 Michigan State	0	15	21	0	36
No. 18 Notre Dame	7	0	7	14	28

- Date: September 17, 2016
- Location:
  Notre Dame Stadium
  South Bend, IN
- Game start: 7:44 p.m.
- Elapsed time: 3:31
- Game attendance: 80,795
- Game weather: 77 °F (25 °C), Wind: 6 MPH W, Clear
- Referee: Dan Capron
- TV announcers (NBC): Mike Tirico (Play-by-Play), Doug Flutie (Analyst), Kathryn Tappen (Sideline)

Scoring summary
1	03:07	ND	DeShone Kizer 14-yard run (Justin Yoon kick)	0–7 ND
2	09:30	MSU	Donnie Corley 38-yard pass from Tyler O'Connor (Matt Macksood pass to Josiah Price)	8–7 MSU
2	00:23	MSU	R.J. Shelton 10-yard pass from Tyler O'Connor (Michael Geiger kick)	15–7 MSU
3	07:48	MSU	Gerald Holmes 3-yard run (Michael Geiger kick)	22–7 MSU
3	06:28	MSU	LJ Scott 9-yard run (Michael Geiger kick)	29–7 MSU
3	03:45	MSU	Gerald Holmes 73-yard run (Michael Geiger kick)	36–7 MSU
3	02:40	ND	Equanimeous St. Brown 15-yard pass from DeShone Kizer (Justin Yoon kick)	36–14 MSU
4	11:45	ND	DeShone Kizer 3-yard run (Justin Yoon kick)	36–21 MSU
4	06:02	ND	Durham Smythe 12-yard pass from DeShone Kizer (Justin Yoon kick)	36–28 MSU

After their first bye week, the Spartans traveled to South Bend to renew the Megaphone Trophy rivalry, the teams' first meeting since 2013. Notre Dame, after an overtime loss to Texas and a defeat of Nevada, took on the Spartans in what some labelled a must-win for the Irish's playoff hopes. After returning the opening kickoff for a touchdown, Notre Dame had the play called back due to a holding call. Their first possession ended in a punt while the Spartans followed suit. Notre Dame took the early lead on their next possession going 91 yards on 10 plays capped by Deshone Kizer 14-yard run.

The Spartans attempted to answer on their next possession, but their drive ended on the second play of the second quarter as Devin Studstill intercepted a Tyler O'Connor pass at the Notre Dame three yard line. Momentum appeared to be in the Fighting Irish's favor, but their ensuing drive netted negative yards as MSU's defense stepped up. However, MSU's offense managed a three and out following the defense's stand. Momentum would change again on the ensuing punt which hit a Notre Dame player and was recovered by MSU on the Notre Dame 38. MSU took advantage on the next play as O'Connor completed a pass to freshman wide receiver Donnie Corley for a 38-yard touchdown pass. MSU used the swinging gate on the ensuing conversion to get the two-pointer and take the lead 8–7. Notre Dame turned the ball over again on a fumble on the first play of their next drive, but MSU could not capitalize and the team exchanged punts. With 4:35 remaining in the first half, MSU engineered an 11 play 92-yard drive that ended with R.J. Shelton scoring a 10-yard touchdown on a shovel pass and MSU extended the lead to 15–7 as half time neared.

The teams exchanged punts to open the second half, but momentum appeared to be on MSU's drive following a 10 play 75-yard drive as Gerald Holmes plunged into the endzone from three yards out and MSU increased their lead to double digits, 22–7. On the ensuing possession, Michigan State linebacker Jon Reschke, with a severely bandaged hand, intercepted Kizer at the Notre Dame 39. Three plays later, LJ Scott scampered into the endzone from 9 yards out and the lead bulged to 29–7. Following a three and out again by Notre Dame, Gerald Holmes blasted through the line and scored on a 73-yard touchdown run. The rout appeared to be on as MSU led 36–7.

However, Notre Dame did not give in. As MSU appeared to sit back defensively, Notre Dame scored touchdowns on their next three possessions as the Spartan offense and defense did little to stop them. With 6:02 in the game and the lead having shrunk to 36–28, MSU had a chance to run out the clock. However, the possession gained only five yards and MSU punted with 4:18 remaining in the game. MSU's defense, having given up three straight touchdowns, needed a stop on the ensuing Notre Dame possession forcing Notre Dame in to a fourth and seven situation where the Irish chose to punt and hope to stop MSU's offense. With 3:11 remaining, the MSU offense took over at their own 14 needing at least one first down to seal the game. On third down, O'Connor hit Corley on a 28-yard pass for a first down and MSU was able to run out the clock holding off Notre Dame, 36–28. MSU moved to 2–0 on the young season as Notre Dame fell to 1–2.

Tyler O'Connor finished the day 19–26 for 241 yards, two touchdowns, and one interception. Gerald Holmes led the rushing attack as he amassed 100 yards on 13 carries as the team rushed for 260 yards. LJ Scott added 98 yards on 22 attempts. Donnie Corley led the receivers with four catches for 88 yards while R.J. Shelton hauled in eight balls for 80 yards. Both scored a touchdown.

=== Wisconsin ===
No. 11 Wisconsin at No. 8 Michigan State

Team	1	2	3	4	Total
• No. 11 Wisconsin	7	6	17	0	30
No. 8 Michigan State	3	3	0	0	6

- Date: September 24, 2016
- Location:
  Spartan Stadium
  East Lansing, MI
- Game start: 12:01 pm
- Elapsed time: 3:12
- Game attendance: 75,505
- Game weather: 63 °F (17 °C), Wind: ENE 8 MPH, Partly Cloudy
- Referee: Jerry McGinn
- TV announcers (BTN): Kevin Kugler (play-by-play), Matt Millen (analyst), Lisa Byington (sideline)

Scoring summary
1	08:03	MSU	Michael Geiger 48-yard field goal	3–0 MSU
1	00:25	WIS	Eric Steffes 1-yard pass from Alex Hornibrook (Andrew Endicott kick)	7–3 WIS
2	07:14	WIS	Corey Clement 1-yard run (kick failed)	13–3 WIS
2	01:18	MSU	Michael Geiger 40-yard field goal	13–6 WIS
3	13:10	WIS	Leo Musso 66-yard fumble recovery (Andrew Endicott kick)	20–6 WIS
3	04:58	WIS	Andrew Endicott 41-yard field goal	23–6 WIS
3	03:52	WIS	Corey Clement 5-yard run (Andrew Endicott kick)	30–6 WIS

The Spartans and Badgers met for the first time in four years. Michigan State had won the previous meeting in overtime 16–13, snapping Wisconsin's 21 game home-winning streak in the process. MSU looked to be the team with momentum coming off a win over Notre Dame while Wisconsin had barely beat Georgia State. The Spartans were the first team to score, getting a 41-yard field goal from Michael Geiger on their second possession and jumping into the lead 3–0. However, the Badgers answered on the ensuing possession driving 65 yards before a one-yard pass from freshman quarter Alex Hornibrook to Eric Steffes put the Baders up 7–3. Neither team managed much on their next possessions and exchanged punts as the game moved to the second quarter.

On the Spartans' next drive, Tyler O'Connor was intercepted at the MSU 36 and Wisconsin took possession on the MSU 28 following the return. Seven plays later Corey Clement scored on a one-yard touchdown run, but the kick failed as Wisconsin increased its lead to 13–3. The Spartans responded with their longest drive of the game, but were turned away at the Wisconsin 23 and settled for a Michael Geiger 40-yard field goal to bring the score to 13–6. Wisconsin answered with a long drive of their own and looked to be adding to their lead before Hornibrook was intercepted as time expired.

Beginning the second half, Wisconsin went three and out, giving the Spartans a chance to cut into the Badger lead. However, on the ensuing possession, LJ Scott was hit, the ball popped loose, and was picked up and returned 66 yards by Leo Musso to extend the Badger lead to 20–6. MSU again managed little offensively before punting and Wisconsin increased the lead further by kicking a 41-yard field goal. Trailing 23–6, MSU's offense was against unable to muster anything and was forced to punt. However, a miscue on the punt allowed Wisconsin to take over on the five-yard line and Corey Clement scored his second touchdown of the game and move the lead to 30–6 with the less than four minutes remaining in the third quarter. The Spartans attempted to make comeback on their next possession, but a good drive into Wisconsin territory ended with another O'Connor interception.

Wisconsin took over on five minuted drive into the fourth quarter, but was forced to punt. MSU could not muster any further offense turning the ball over on downs and ending another drive with O'Connor's third interception of the game. MSU fell 30–6.

The Spartans only managed 75 yards rushing but did out-gaining Wisconsin 325 to 317 total yards, but turned the ball over four times and on fumbled punt play. Wisconsin rushed for 122 yards as they routed the Spartans. O'Connor was 20–43 with three interceptions. The loss marked the biggest loss at Spartan Stadium since the Spartans lost 42–14 to Penn State in 2009.

=== Indiana ===
No. 17 Michigan State at Indiana
(Old Brass Spittoon)

Team	1	2	3	4	OT	Total
No. 17 Michigan State	7	0	7	7	0	21
• Indiana	0	0	7	14	3	24

- Date: October 1, 2016
- Location: Memorial Stadium
  Bloomington, IN
- Game start: 8:05 pm
- Elapsed time: 3:45
- Game attendance: 43,971
- Game weather: 63 °F (17 °C), Wind: S 4 MPH, Fair
- Referee: Michael Cannon
- TV announcers (BTN): Eric Collins (play-by-play), Glen Mason (analyst)

Scoring summary
1	04:39	MSU	R.J. Shelton 86-yard pass from Tyler O'Connor (Michael Geiger kick)	7–0 MSU
3	04:00	MSU	Delton Williams 24-yard pass from Tyler O'Connor (Michael Geiger kick)	14–0 MSU
3	00:52	IND	Richard Lagow 5-yard pass from Michell Paige (Griffin Oakes kick)	14–7 MSU
4	08:23	IND	Ricky Jones 22-yard pass from Richard Lagow (Griffin Oakes kick)	14–14 TIE
4	04:38	IND	Mitchell Paige 15-yard pass from Richard Lagow (Griffin Oakes kick)	21–14 IND
4	00:11	MSU	Josiah Price 2-yard pass from Tyler O'Connor (Michael Geiger kick)	21–21 TIE
OT	15:00	IND	Griffin Oakes 20-yard field goal	24–21 IND

The Spartans traveled to Indiana looking to make up for their loss to Wisconsin the previous week. Indiana figured to be a good opponent for the Spartans as MSU had not lost to Indiana since 2006. With the Old Brass Spittoon on the line, MSU started the game with an almost 10 minute drive aided by an Indiana pass interference call on a third down play. However, the drive sputtered near the Indiana 20-yard line and MSU settled for a 40-yard field goal attempt from Michael Geiger. The field goal was blocked and MSU settled for no points on their opening drive. Indiana's offense mustered little and punted the ball back to MSU who took over at their own 13. On the second play of the drive, Tyler O'Connor found R.J. Shelton on an 86-yard pitch and catch that put MSU up 7–0. The Hoosiers offense again managed little and the teams traded punts as the game moved into the second quarter.

With 11:43 remaining in the first half, MSU took over and drove the ball from their own 10-yard line to the Indiana 40. However, a bad shotgun snap ended in a fumble recovery for Indiana. Indiana quickly turned the ball back over to the Spartans as Vayante Copeland picked off Indiana QB Richard Lagow. MSU's offense could not take advantage and punted the ball back to Indiana. Indiana's offense moved the ball into MSU territory, but sputtered and settled for a 50-yard field goal attempt that was wide right. With 46 second remaining, the Spartan offense could not get in to scoring position and the half ended with MSU leading 7–0.

Indiana began the second half moving the ball well and pushed the ball to the MSU two-yard line before turning the ball over on downs instead of attempting a field goal. The Spartans and Hoosiers exchanged punts before MSU went 77 yards to increase their lead to 14–0 capped off by a 24-yard pass from O'Connor to Delton Williams. The game looked like MSU's for the taking, however, Indiana quickly answered on a trick play where Indiana QB Richard Lagow caught a pass from WR Mitchell Paige and scampered into the endzone from five yards out to cut the lead in half, 14–7.

The Spartans' next drive ended in another punt and the Hoosiers took over with just over 11 minutes remaining in the game. Indiana again pushed the ball down the field and Lagow found Ricky Jones on a pass for a 22-yard touchdown as Indiana tied it up, 14–14. Following a three and out for MSU, Indiana again easily moved down the field and Lagow threw his third touchdown of the game from 15 yards out to Mitchell Paige and the Spartans, who led most of the game, found themselves down 21–14 with under five minutes remaining. On the touchdown pass, DL Malik McDowell was ejected on a controversial targeting penalty as he hit Lagow. Reminiscent of the prior year's drive to win the Big Ten title game, MSU went on a 13 play, 75-yard drive to tie the game on what appeared to be a Gerald Holmes touchdown run. However, the play was reversed and MSU was left with a fourth and goal at the Indiana two-yard line. With 11 seconds remaining, O'Connor hit TE Josiah Price for the easy score and Michael Geiger tied itwith the extra point as the teams headed to overtime, 21–21.

MSU had the ball first in overtime, but O'Connor was sacked on second and third down, losing almost 10 yards. The Spartans were forced to settle for a Michael Geiger 49-yard field goal attempt which was short. Indiana took their possession needing only a field goal to win. The Spartan defense forced Indiana to attempt a 33-yard field goal which kicker Griffin Oakes missed. However, Drake Martinez was whistled for a leaping penalty as he jumped over the line attempting to block the field goal. Indiana was given a first down on the play and moved the ball to the MSU three-yard line before Griffin connected on at 20-yard field goal to win the game for Indiana, 24–21.

The win marked Indiana's first overtime win in six years. The loss marked MSU's first back-to-back losses since 2012. As a result of the loss, MSU dropped from the AP Poll for the first time since 2013.

=== BYU ===
BYU at Michigan State

Team	1	2	3	4	Total
• BYU	0	3	7	21	31
Michigan State	7	0	0	7	14

- Date: October 8, 2016
- Location: Spartan Stadium
  East Lansing, MI
- Game start: 3:36 p.m. EDT
- Elapsed time: 3:25
- Game attendance: 74,214
- Game weather: 57 °F (14 °C), Wind: WNW 16 MPH, Sunny
- Referee: Mike Defee
- TV announcers (ABC/ESPN2): Mike Patrick (play-by-play), Ed Cunningham (analyst), Dr. Jerry Punch (sidelines)

Scoring summary
1	04:10	MSU	Gerald Holmes 8-yard run (Michael Geiger kick)	7–0 MSU
2	00:00	BYU	Rhett Almond 35-yard field goal	7–3 MSU
3	04:52	BYU	Colby Pearson 4-yard pass from Taysom Hill (Rhett Almond kick)	10–7 BYU
4	12:43	BYU	Taysom Hill 12-yard run (Rhett Almond kick)	17–7 BYU
4	08:00	BYU	Jamaal Williams 8-yard run (Rhett Almond kick)	24–7 BYU
4	04:59	MSU	Damion Terry 1-yard run (Michael Geiger kick)	24–14 BYU
4	01:59	BYU	Jamaal Williams 1-yard run (Rhett Almond kick)	31–14 BYU

Looking to avoid their third straight loss, the Spartans returned home for a non-conference game against BYU. Michigan State scored a touchdown on its first drive, but the BYU defense shut down the Spartans for the remainder of the first half. Still, MSU led at the half 7–3. Following an MSU three-and-out to start the second half, the Cougars scored their first touchdown on a 13-play, 73-yard drive that ended with a Colby Pearson touchdown catch to give the Cougars the lead 10–7. Another three-and-out led to another long touchdown drive for the Cougars: 13 plays, 70 yards capped off Taysom Hill 12-yard touchdown run to extend the lead to 17–7. A Damian Terry interception on MSU's ensuing possession set the Cougars up for their third touchdown of the game and increased their lead to 24–7. MSU drew within 10 on the ensuing possession on a one-yard touchdown run by Terry, but the Cougars answered with an eight-play, 80-yard drive to end the game. The Spartans fell 31–14 and moved to 2–3 on the season.

=== Northwestern ===
Northwestern at Michigan State

Team	1	2	3	4	Total
• Northwestern	7	12	21	14	54
Michigan State	14	3	14	9	40

- Date: October 15, 2016
- Location:
  Spartan Stadium
  East Lansing, MI
- Game start: 3:36 p.m.
- Elapsed time: 3:38
- Game attendance: 75,625
- Game weather: 67 °F (19 °C), Wind: 13 MPH SSW, Overcast
- Referee: John O'Neill
- TV announcers (BTN): Kevin Kugler (play-by-play), Matt Millen (analyst), Lisa Byington (sideline)

Scoring summary
1	09:53	MSU	Josiah Price 15-yard pass from Brian Lewerke (Michael Geiger kick)	7–0 MSU
1	08:31	MSU	Justin Layne 43-yard interception return (Michael Geiger kick)	14–0 MSU
1	03:32	NW	Justin Jackson 29-yard run (Jack Mitchell kick)	14–7 MSU
2	14:15	MSU	Michael Geiger 41-yard field goal	17–7 MSU
2	10:04	NW	Austin Carr 9-yard pass from Clayton Thorson (Jack Mitchell kick)	17–14 MSU
2	09:23	NW	Joe Gaziano Safety	17–16 MSU
2	06:42	NW	Jack Mitchell 33-yard field goal	19–17 NW
3	13:28	NW	Flynn Nagel 57-yard pass from Clayton Thorson (Jack Mitchell kick)	26–17 NW
3	06:49	NW	Clayton Thorson 9-yard run (Jack Mitchell kick)	33–17 NW
3	05:54	MSU	RJ Shelton 59-yard pass from Tyler O'Connor (Michael Geiger kick)	33–24 NW
3	02:08	MSU	R.J. Shelton 86-yard pass from Tyler O'Connor (Michael Geiger kick)	33–31 NW
3	01:53	NW	Solomon Vault 95-yard kickoff return (Jack Mitchell kick)	40–31 NW
4	08:25	NW	Justin Jackson 26-yard run (Jack Mitchell kick)	47–31 NW
4	07:10	MSU	Donnie Corley 9-yard pass from Tyler O'Connor (two-point pass conversion failed)	47–37 NW
4	05:02	NW	Austin Carr 29-yard pass from Clayton Thorson (Jack Mitchell kick)	54–37 NW
4	00:56	MSU	Michael Geiger 35-yard field goal	54–40 NW

MSU took the early lead at home against the Wildcats on a 15-yard touchdown pass from Brian Lewerke to Josiah Price. Clayton Thorson was intercepted on Northwestern's next possession and Justin Layne returned the pick 43 yards to give the Spartans a 14–0 lead. Northwestern answered late in the first quarter with a Justin Jackson 29-yard touchdown run to bring the Wildcats within seven. An MSU field goal preceded a 12-play, 75-yard touchdown drive by the Wildcats that put them within three points, 17–14. A poor kick return and MSU penalty on the ensuing kickoff left the Spartans at their own five-yard line. Two plays later, Northwestern defensive lineman Joe Gaziano sacked Lewerke for safety to bring the score to 17–16. The Wildcats took the lead on a field goal and led at the half 19–17. In the second half, the MSU defense fell apart allowing touchdown drives of 75 and 86 yards to give Northwestern the 33–17 lead. MSU brought the game within two points on R.J. Shelton 59-yard and 86-yard touchdown catches from Tyler O'Connor. However, Northwestern scored three touchdowns on their next three possessions, including a 95-yard kickoff return for a touchdown by Solomon Vault. An MSU touchdown and field goal brought the Spartans within 14 points, but it was too little late as MSU lost its fourth straight game, 54–40.

=== Maryland ===
Michigan State at Maryland

Team	1	2	3	4	Total
Michigan State	0	14	3	0	17
• Maryland	8	6	0	14	28

- Date: October 22, 2016
- Location:
  Byrd Stadium
  College Park, MD
- Game start: 7:42 pm
- Elapsed time: 3:12
- Game attendance: 41,235
- Game weather: 56 F Wind: W 15 mph, Mostly cloudy
- Referee: Daniel Capron
- TV announcers (BTN): Eric Collins (play-by-play), Glenn Mason (analyst)

Scoring summary
1	02:51	MD	Harrison, L. 8 yd run (Goins, K. rush)	8–0 MD
2	09:41	MSU	Scott, LJ 48 yd run (Geiger, Michael kick)	8–7 MD
2	05:41	MD	Moore, D. 36 yd pass from Hills, P. (Greene, A. kick failed)	14–7 MD
2	00:38	MSU	Holmes, Gerald 1 yd run (Geiger, Michael kick)	14–14 TIE
3	01:35	MSU	Geiger, Michael 34 yd field goal	17–14 MSU
4	13:49	MD	Goins, K. 2 yd run (Greene, A. kick)	21–17 MD
4	03:23	MD	Jacobs, L. 9 yd pass from Hills, P. (Greene, A. kick)	28–17 MD

Traveling to Maryland, the 2–4 Spartans looked to save their season against the Terrapins. On their second possession of the game, Brian Lewerke's pass from the 50 was intercepted at Maryland's four-yard line. The Terrapins answered with a 96-yard drive culminating with a Lorenzo Harrison run for eight yards to put the Terrapins up 8–0 with the two-point conversion. MSU would answer early in the second half with an LJ Scott 48-yard touchdown run to pull within one, 8–7. Maryland extended the lead to 14–7 after a missed extra point and MSU tied the game on a one-yard run by Gerald Holmes. In the second half, the Spartans took the lead on a Matt Geiger field goal, but the defense could not hold the lead. The Terrapins scored touchdowns on 75-yard and 82-yard drives to put the game away, 28–17. The loss was the fifth straight for the Spartans and the longest of Mark Dantonio's career at MSU.

=== Michigan ===
Michigan at Michigan State
(Paul Bunyan Trophy)

Team	1	2	3	4	Total
• No. 2 Michigan	7	20	0	5	32
Michigan State	7	3	0	13	23

- Date: October 29, 2016
- Location:
  Spartan Stadium
  East Lansing, MI
- Game start: 12:01 pm
- Elapsed time: 3:46
- Game attendance: 75,802
- Game weather: 68 F, Wind: WSW 11 MPH, Overcast
- Referee: Don Willard
- TV announcers (ESPN): Bob Wischusen (play-by-play), Brock Huard (analyst)

Scoring summary
1	07:58	MSU	Scott, LJ 5 yd run (Geiger, Michael kick)	7–0 MSU
1	04:30	MICH	Peppers, J. 3 yd run (Allen, Kenny kick)	7–7 TIE
2	12:19	MICH	Smith, De'Veon 1 yd run (Allen, Kenny kick)	14–7 MICH
2	09:24	MSU	Geiger, Michael 52 yd field goal	14–10 MICH
2	06:41	MICH	Allen, Kenny 23 yd field goal	17–10 MICH
2	00:39	MICH	Smith, De'Veon 5 yd run (Allen, Kenny kick)	24–10 MICH
2	00:00	MICH	Allen, Kenny 23 yd field goal	27–10 MICH
4	14:42	MICH	Allen, Kenny 45 yd field goal	30–10
4	07:31	MSU	Madaris, Monty 20 yd pass from Lewerke, Brian (Geiger, Michael kick)	30–17 MICH
4	00:01	MSU	Corley, Donnie 5 yd pass from O'Connor, Tyler (O'Connor, Tyler rush fumbld)	30–23 MICH
4	00:01	MICH	Peppers, J. PAT return	32–23 MICH

In what was expected to be a Michigan blowout, the No. 2-ranked Wolverines took the lead on the Spartans, scoring on their first four possessions and taking a 27–10 lead at the half. However, in the second half, the MSU defense stepped up and shut down the Wolverine offense. The Spartan D held Michigan to a field goal, but the Spartan offense could not take full advantage. A Monty Madaris 20-yard pass from Brian Lewerke pulled the Spartans within 30–17 with seven minutes remaining in the game. A 64-yard drive stalled deep in Michigan territory and MSU turned the ball over on downs with 1:39 remaining. MSU did add another touchdown with one second remaining on a Donnie Corley five-yard touchdown pass from Tyler O'Connor. MSU attempted a two-point conversion following the score, but Michigan's all-everything player Jabril Peppers recovered a fumble to return the ball for a two-point conversion for the Wolverines. MSU fell 32–23 and moved to 2–6 and 0–5 on the season.

=== Illinois ===
Michigan State at Illinois

Team	1	2	3	4	Total
Michigan State	3	3	11	10	27
• Illinois	0	7	10	14	31

- Date: November 5, 2016
- Location: Memorial Stadium
  Champaign, IL
- Game start: 11:01 am
- Elapsed time: 3:43
- Game attendance: 47,144
- Game weather: 56 F, Wind: SW 8 MPH, Partly Cloudy
- Referee: Jerry McGinn
- TV announcers (ESPNEWS): Mike Couzens (play-by-play), Glen Mason (analyst)

Scoring summary
1	10:57	MSU	Geiger, Michael 46 yd field goal	3–0 MSU
2	02:35	MSU	Geiger, Michael 34 yd field goal	6–0 MSU
2	00:14	ILL	Foster, K. 19 yd run (McLaughlin, C. kick)	7–6 ILL
3	11:25	MSU	Geiger, Michael 28 yd field goal	9–7 MSU
3	09:59	ILL	Foster, K. 64 yd run (McLaughlin, C. kick)	14–9 ILL
3	08:56	ILL	McLaughlin, C. 42 yd field goal	17–9 ILL
3	00:58	MSU	Holmes, Gerald 6 yd run (Shelton, R.J. pass from O'Connor, Tyler)	17–17 TIE
4	12:37	ILL	Johnson, Ainslie 1 yd pass from George, Jr., J. (McLaughlin, C. kick)	24–17 ILL
4	06:45	MSU	Geiger, Michael 29 yd field goal	24–20 ILL
4	02:52	MSU	Shelton, R.J. 13 yd pass from Terry, Damion (Geiger, Michael kick)	27–24 MSU
4	01:35	ILL	Mays, Sam 16 yd pass from George, Jr., J. (McLaughlin, C. kick)	31–27 ILL

In what proved to be a low point in Michigan State's season, they lost to an Illinois team they were heavily favored over. Michigan State with the loss was now bowl ineligible.

=== Rutgers ===
Rutgers at Michigan State

Team	1	2	3	4	Total
Rutgers	0	0	0	0	0
• Michigan State	21	14	14	0	49

- Date: November 12, 2016
- Location:
  Spartan Stadium
  East Lansing, MI

Scoring summary
1	08:21	MSU	Price, Josiah 2 yd pass from O'Connor, Tyler (Geiger, Michael kick)	7–0 MSU
1	08:03	MSU	Cox, Demetrious 30 yd interception return (Geiger, Michael kick)	14–0 MSU
1	05:22	MSU	Jackson, T. 50 yd pass from O'Connor, Tyler (Geiger, Michael kick)	21–0 MSU
2	07:07	MSU	Price, Josiah 4 yd pass from O'Connor, Tyler (Geiger, Michael kick)	28–0 MSU
2	01:02	MSU	Scott, LJ 1 yd run (Geiger, Michael kick)	35–0 MSU
3	06:54	MSU	London, Madre 2 yd run (Geiger, Michael kick)	42–0 MSU
3	01:33	MSU	London, Madre 6 yd run (Geiger, Michael kick)	49–0 MSU

Despite the disastrous season, Michigan State achieved 49–0 shutout of a woeful Rutgers team that had already been shut out twice this season.

=== Ohio State ===
Ohio State at Michigan State

Team	1	2	3	4	Total
• No. 2 Ohio State	7	3	7	0	17
Michigan State	7	3	0	6	16

- Date: November 19, 2016
- Location:
  Spartan Stadium
  East Lansing, MI
- Game start: 12:00 p.m.
- Elapsed time: 3:35
- Game attendance: 73,303
- Game weather: Cold, snow showers
- Television network: ESPN

Scoring summary
Q1	14:14	MSU	LJ Scott 64-yard pass from Tyler O'Connor (Michael Geiger kick)	MSU 7–0
Q1	7:56	OSU	Curtis Samuel 24-yard pass from J. T. Barrett (Tyler Durbin kick)	TIE 7–7
Q2	13:42	MSU	Michael Geiger 28-yard field goal	MSU 10–7
Q2	10:03	OSU	Tyler Durbin 39-yard field goal	TIE 10–10
Q3	5:33	OSU	Mike Weber 4-yard run (Tyler Durbin kick)	OSU 17–10
Q4	4:41	MSU	LJ Scott 1-yard run (two-point pass conversion failed)	OSU 17–16

Despite a bowl game being out of play for the Spartans, they showed up strong and very nearly upset the heavily favored Buckeyes, playing with pride and looking more like the team that was expected to show up in 2016.

=== Penn State ===
Michigan State at Penn State
(Land Grant Trophy)

Team	1	2	3	4	Total
Michigan State	6	6	0	0	12
• No. 8 Penn State	0	10	21	14	45

- Date: November 26, 2016
- Location:
  Beaver Stadium
  University Park, PA
- Game start: 3:30 p.m. EDT
- Game attendance: 97,418
- Television network: ESPN

Scoring summary
Q1	8:13	MSU	Michael Geiger 28-yard field goal	MSU 3–0
Q1	2:44	MSU	Michael Geiger 36-yard field goal	MSU 6–0
Q2	13:11	PSU	Tyler Davis 35-yard field goal	MSU 6–3
Q2	7:17	MSU	Michael Geiger 33-yard field goal	MSU 9–3
Q2	2:14	PSU	Saquon Barkley 1-yard run (Tyler Davis kick)	PSU 10–9
Q2	0:14	MSU	Michael Geiger 21-yard field goal	MSU 12–10
Q3	11:02	PSU	Chris Godwin 34-yard pass from Trace McSorley (Tyler Davis kick)	PSU 17–12
Q3	7:03	PSU	Mike Gesicki 45-yard pass from Trace McSorley (Tyler Davis kick)	PSU 24–12
Q3	2:05	PSU	Chris Godwin 59-yard pass from Trace McSorley (Tyler Davis kick)	PSU 31–12
Q4	6:33	PSU	Andre Robinson 14-yard run (Tyler Davis kick)	PSU 38–12
Q4	3:40	PSU	Andre Robinson 40-yard pass from Trace McSorley (Tyler Davis Kick)	PSU 45–12

Michigan State started out strong, getting into a back and forth game with Penn State in the first half. Michigan State led 12–10 at halftime on four field goals, two of which were nearly touchdowns. Michigan State's gameplan was to shut down explosive running back Saquon Barkley, which proved successful. Things changed in the second half as Penn State came out strong, abandoning the run game and going more to the air, allowing Trace McSorley to switch the game around in Penn State's favor, taking a 17–12 lead and never looking back. After the Nittany Lions went up 45–12, the backups came in. Michigan State was unable to cut into Penn State's lead during mopup time, leading to this being Michigan State's most lopsided loss of the 2016 season.

== Rankings ==
Ranking movements Legend: ██ Increase in ranking ██ Decrease in ranking — = Not ranked RV = Received votes
	Week															
Poll	Pre	1	2	3	4	5	6	7	8	9	10	11	12	13	14	Final
AP	12	12	12	8	17	RV	—	—	—	—	—	—	—	—	—	—
Coaches	11	8	8	8	16	RV	—	—	—	—	—	—	—	—	—	—
CFP	Not released									—	—	—	—	—	—	Not released

== Awards and honors ==
All-Big Ten
Player	Selection	Ref.
R. J. Shelton	Second Team (Coaches); Honorable Mention (Media)	
Brian Allen	Third Team (Coaches); Second Team (Media)	
Josiah Price	Third Team (Coaches); Honorable Mention (Media)	
Malik McDowell	Second Team (Coaches & Media)	
Riley Bullough	Third Team (Coaches & Media)	
Darian Hicks	Honorable Mention (Coaches & Media)	
Montae Nicholson	Honorable Mention (Coaches & Media)	
L. J. Scott	Third Team (Media)	
Chris Frey	Honorable Mention (Media)	
