= Mark Rosenbaum =

Mark D. Rosenbaum
- Occupations: Civil rights lawyer and academic
- Known for: Economic justice, education equity, immigrant rights

Academic background
- Education: B.A. J.D.
- Alma mater: University of Michigan; Harvard Law School

Academic work
- Institutions: Public Counsel; Peking University School of Transnational Law; University of California, Irvine

Mark D. Rosenbaum is an American civil rights lawyer and academic who is most known for his advocacy in landmark cases on issues of race, gender, poverty, homelessness, education, voting rights, worker rights, immigrant rights, rights of criminal defendants, national security, and First Amendment. He is a Senior Counsel for Public Counsel Strategic Litigation. He has a long history as an adjunct professor, most recently at UC Irvine School of Law, and Professor of Constitutional Law at Peking University School of Transnational Law.

He is the recipient of the Citizen Activist Award, and was named Lawyer of the Year by California Lawyer Magazine, in addition to being named to the Daily Journal's list of "Top 100 Lawyers in California" and as one of the "Top Lawyers of the Decade" for his impact litigation on education.

== Education ==
Rosenbaum obtained a Bachelor of Arts degree from the University of Michigan in 1970. He received his J.D. from Harvard Law School in 1974 where he served as Vice President of the Harvard Legal Aid Bureau.

== Career ==
While in law school, Rosenbaum worked as a law clerk to Leonard Boudin in the Harrisburg 8 case (United States v. Berrigan) and the Pentagon Papers case (United States v. Ellsberg and Russo). After graduation from Harvard, he worked for forty years at the ACLU Foundation of Southern California, first as Staff Counsel, then as General Counsel and Legal Director. In 2014, he became director of Opportunity of Law at Public Counsel, a position he held until 2023 when he assumed his current position.

Rosenbaum began his academic career as a professor at People's College of Law and was an adjunct professor at Loyola Law School in 1989 and the University of Southern California Law Center from 1992 to 1995. From 2001 to 2004, he was an adjunct professor at UCLA School of Law. He taught constitutional and civil rights courses at the University of Michigan Law School from 1993 to 2014 where he was Harvey Gunderson Professor of Law.

=== Litigation ===
Rosenbaum has argued before the Supreme Court four times. He served as lead and principal counsel in cases that secured over $1 billion for textbooks, qualified teachers, and facilities for underserved schools in California (Williams v. California); ended over a century of Latino discrimination in the districting of the Los Angeles County Board of Supervisors (Garza v. Board of Supervisors); and invalidated Proposition 187 that denied K-12 and higher education, health care, and social services based on immigration status (Gregorio T. v. Wilson).

He established a federal constitutional right of access to literacy, which resulted in a $94.4 million settlement on behalf of Detroit students (Gary B. v. Whitmer); a state constitutional right of access to literacy on behalf of California students, resulting in the provision of $53 million for a program for literacy in 75 disadvantaged schools (Ella T. v. California); a state constitutional right under New York law to a 'sound basic education' that eliminates segregated and underresourced schools for Black and Latino students in New York City and includes 'inputs to ameliorate racism and poverty' (IntegrateNYC v. State of New York). His work desegregated Los Angeles schools (Crawford v. Board of Education), blocked the Trump Administration's rescission of the DACA program (DHS v. Regents of the University of California), provided mental health assistance to families separated as a consequence of the Trump Administration “Zero Tolerance” policy (Ms. J.P. v. Barr), and reversed the conviction of Black Panther Geronimo Pratt (In re Pratt).

In other cases, he established the right to a trauma-sensitive education to address barriers to learning caused by trauma; sued under FOIA to establish that citizens had the right to know about FBI surveillance of John Lennon; established the right to metropolitan desegregation on behalf of students in E Palo Alto (Tinsley v. Palo Alto Unified School District); and removed a religious symbol, the cross, from an official county seal (Davies v. County of Los Angeles).

Among other cases he has litigated, Rosenbaum established federal constitutional rights before the U.S. Supreme Court, including the right of interstate travel (Saenz v. Roe), and anonymity (Kolender v. Lawson). He helped secure the first decisions recognizing a right to permanent supportive housing on behalf of unhoused veterans (Powers v. McDonough), requiring a notice of asylum rights for detained Salvadorans (Orantes-Hernandez v. Smith), invalidating the use of the SAT in California state universities (Smith v. Regents of the State of California), and appointing counsel for minors in immigration detention cases (Perez-Funez v. INS).

Additionally, he was part of the team that brought litigation to end harassment of activist and actress Jane Fonda and LAPD police spying on activists in Los Angeles (CAPA v. LAPD) and enjoined the closing of County General and Rancho Los Amigos hospitals (Rodde v. Bonta) and helped represent filmmakers Emile de Antonio, Haskell Wexler, and Mary Lampson to quash the subpoena seeking outtakes of their documentary on the Weather Underground under the First Amendment. Some of his education equity cases addressed the failures to provide academic courses to students at under-resourced schools (Cruz v. State of California), to remediate the absence of instruction of English instruction to English Learner students, and to provide free education to low-income students (Doe v State of California). In addition, his other cases on behalf of unhoused individuals invalidated identification requirements (Eisenheim v. County of Los Angeles) and increased welfare assistance (City of Los Angeles v. County of Los Angeles). He also represented Pete Rose in his attempt to secure reinstatement and eligibility for election to the Hall of Fame, Susan McDougal against Special Prosecutor Kenneth Starr to transfer custody from Los Angeles County Jail, and Boudin and Leonard Weinglass in the Pentagon Papers case.

Alongside his legal representation in other educational matters, Rosenbaum has led lawsuits against Michigan's ban on college affirmative action, advocated for addressing the 'digital divide' in California's education system through targeted investment in reading and educator training to mitigate pandemic-induced learning loss, and represented seven families in a lawsuit against California for insufficient educational support. He also led plaintiffs in a lawsuit against California, securing a landmark $2 billion settlement for pandemic recovery, benefiting disadvantaged students' access to online learning.

Rosenbaum represented Pedro Guzman, who was wrongfully deported to Mexico by U.S. Immigration and Customs Enforcement in 2007 due to mistaken identity. The 2010 settlement of his lawsuit against the Los Angeles County Sheriff's Department, overseen by U.S. District Judge George H. King, created the $350,000 Guzman Carbajal Qualified Settlement Fund for proper administration. He led the legal battle for Souhair Khatib, who sued Orange County under RLUIPA for being forced to remove her hijab in a courthouse holding facility. The 9th Circuit Court of Appeals ruled in Khatib's favor, affirming RLUIPA's applicability and underscoring the significance of preserving religious freedom for Muslim women in civic settings.

Rosenbaum served as a lawyer with Public Counsel that filed for an injunction against various government tactics in immigration raids on Los Angeles businesses, which resulted in illegal arrests—including arrests based purely on race and appearance, sometimes followed by refusal to allow detained individuals to obtain legal representation. The injunction was granted by Judge Maame E. Frimpong issued an injunction against the Trump administration in July 2025, which was upheld in appeal the following month. Following the appeal rulings, the Washington Post quoted Rosenbaum as stating that the ruling, “sends a powerful message: the government cannot excuse illegal conduct by relying on racial profiling as a tool of immigration enforcement.”

In April 2026, Rosenbaum won a case that upheld the due process rights of unaccompanied immigrant children, when ICE had tried to coerce minors to self-deport themselves in advance of a fair trial.

== Awards and honors ==
- 1993: PCL Clarence Darrow Award
- 1995: ACLU Lifetime Achievement Award
- 1997: NAACP H. Claude Hudson Award
- 1998–1999: Harvard Wasserstein Fellow
- 2004: Citizen Activist Award, Center for Public Leadership
- 2017: Lawyer of the Year, California Lawyer Magazine
- 2020: Lawyer of the Decade, The Daily Journal
- 2020: Litigator of the Week, American Lawyer Magazine
- 2015, 2016, 2018: California Lawyer Attorney of the Year
- 2021: California Association of Black School Administrators BlEdcellence Award
- Pediatric AIDS Hero Award
- 2024: Litigator of the Week, American Lawyer Magazine
- 2026: Shattuck-Price Outstanding Lawyer Award from the Los Angeles County Bar Association.

== Selected articles ==
- Rosenbaum, M. D. (1975). The Inviolability of Privacy Belonging to a Citizen's Political Loyalties. Hastings. Const. LQ, 3, 99.
- Rosenbaum, M. D., & Gale, M. E. (1978). Interdistrict Relief for Segregated Schooling in California: The Constitution Crosses the District Line. San Fernando Valley L. Rev., 7, 117.
- Tokaji, D. P., & Rosenbaum, M. D. (1998). Promoting Equality by Protecting Local Power: A Neo-Federalist Challenge to State Affirmative Action Bans. Stan. L. & Pol'y Rev., 10, 129.
- Rosenbaum, M. D., & Tokaji, D. P. (1999). Healing the Blind Goddess: Race and Criminal Justice. Mich. L. Rev., 98, 1941.
