= Blessuan Austin =

American football player (born 1996)

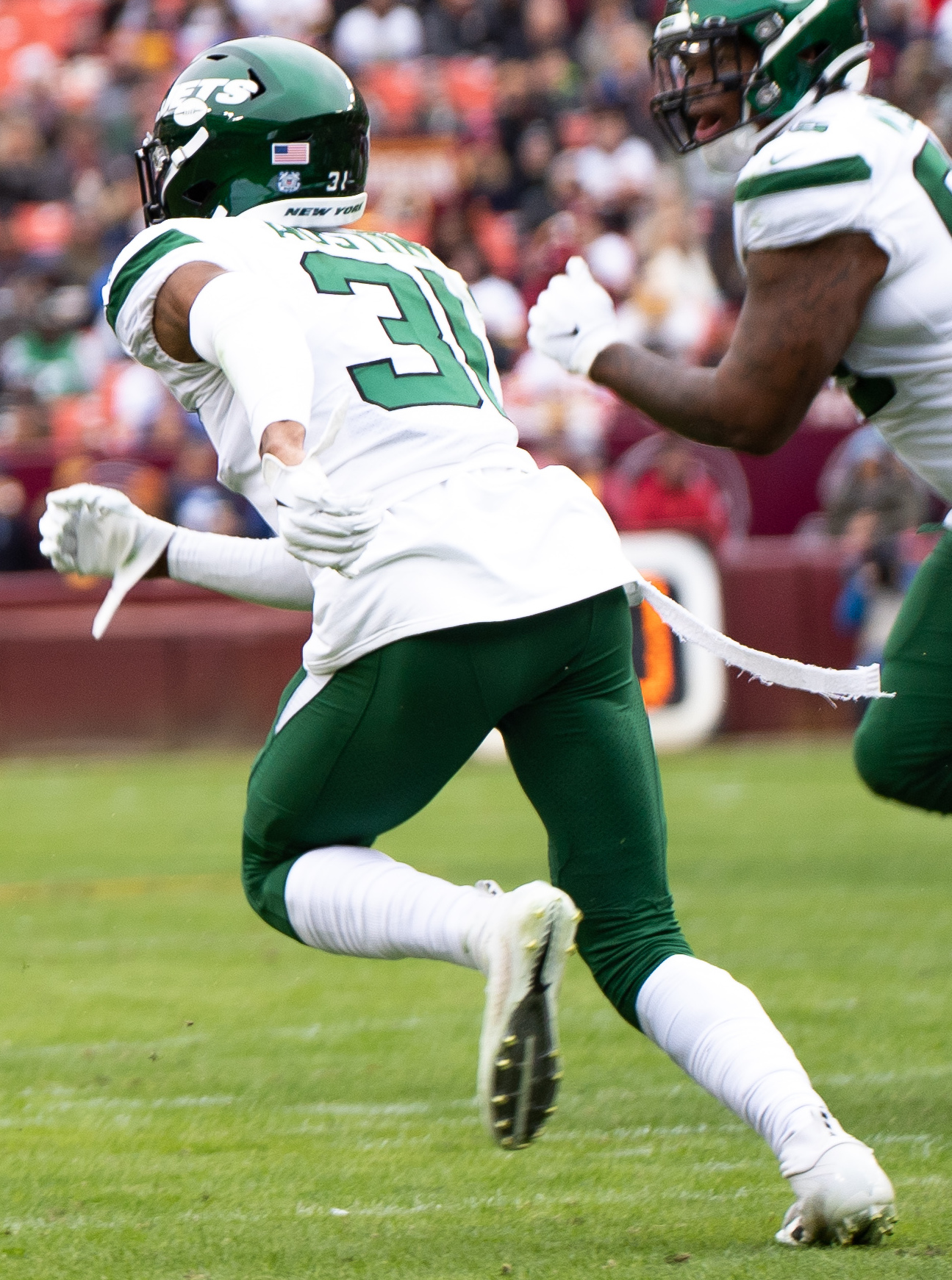
- Austin with the New York Jets in 2019

Profile
- Position: Cornerback

Personal information
- Born: July 19, 1996 (age 30); Queens, New York, U.S.
- Listed height: 6 ft 1 in (1.85 m)
- Listed weight: 198 lb (90 kg)

Career information
- High school: Campus Magnet (Queens, New York)
- College: Rutgers (2015–2018)
- NFL draft: 2019: 6th round, 196th overall pick

Career history
- New York Jets (2019–2020); Seattle Seahawks (2021); Denver Broncos (2022)*; Atlanta Falcons (2023)*
- * Offseason or practice squad member only

Career NFL statistics
- Total tackles: 98
- Forced fumbles: 2
- Pass deflections: 8
- Stats at Pro Football Reference

Blessuan Austin (born July 19, 1996) is an American professional football cornerback. He played college football at Rutgers.

== Early life ==
Austin played the positions of cornerback, safety, quarterback and wide receiver between his years at Milford Academy and Campus Magnet High School. During the 2014 season, Austin recorded 14 tackles and 3 interceptions with the Milford Falcons. His performances earned him All-Queens First Team honors. He was also ranked the No. 8 prospect out of New York by Rivals.com.

== College career ==
Austin began his freshman season at Rutgers University in 2015 as a cornerback with the Scarlet Knights. He started 10 of 11 games in which his season totals included 33 tackles, 4 pass breakups, 1 interception and 1 forced fumble.

During the 2016 season, Austin earned an All-Big Ten honorable mention. In that same season, Austin placed second in the Big Ten and 12th in the national rankings.

In the 2017 season, Austin played in only 4 games before he sustained a left ACL injury against Nebraska. He finished his junior season with a total of 12 tackles, 1 interception and 1 pass breakup.

Austin returned for his senior season in 2018 playing as a defensive back. His return was short-lived as he sustained another season-ending injury to his left ACL for the second time while against Texas State. After Austin played his one and only game, his season totals included three tackles, 1 sack and 1 interception. While at Rugers, Austin majored in labor and employment relations.

Despite his shortened junior and senior seasons being caused by two consecutive knee injuries, Austin declined to remain at Rutgers as a medical redshirt and declared for the 2019 NFL Draft.

== Professional career ==
Pre-draft measurables
Height	Weight	Arm length	Hand span	40-yard dash	10-yard split	20-yard split	Vertical jump	Broad jump	Bench press
6 ft 0 5/8 in (1.84 m)	198 lb (90 kg)	32 1/2 in (0.83 m)	10 in (0.25 m)	4.69 s	1.59 s	2.66 s	35.5 in (0.90 m)	10 ft 3 in (3.12 m)	15 reps
All values from NFL Combine/Pro Day

=== New York Jets ===
Austin was selected by the New York Jets in the sixth round, 196th overall, of the 2019 NFL draft. The Jets previously obtained the selection along with guard Kelechi Osemele in a trade that sent their 2019 fifth round pick to the Oakland Raiders. He was placed on the reserve/non-football injury list on August 31, 2019. He was activated off the NFI on November 7. Austin was placed on injured reserve on November 21, 2020. He was activated on December 12.

On September 1, 2021, Austin was waived by the Jets.

=== Seattle Seahawks ===
On September 7, 2021, Austin was signed by the Seattle Seahawks. He made 11 appearances (one start) for the Seahawks, recording 10 combined tackles.

=== Denver Broncos ===
On April 27, 2022, Austin was signed by the Denver Broncos. He was waived by the Broncos on August 29.

=== Atlanta Falcons ===
On August 14, 2023, Austin signed with the Atlanta Falcons. He was released by the Falcons on August 26.
