= Naquan Jones =

American football player (born 1998)

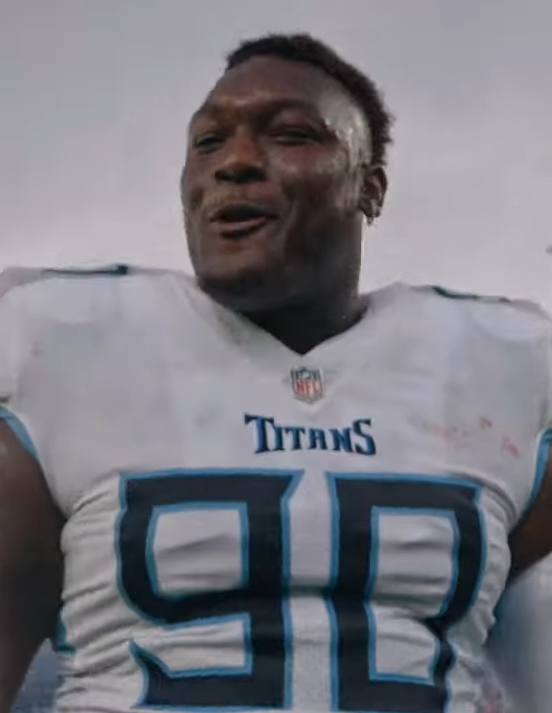
- Jones with the Tennessee Titans in 2023

No. 91 – Houston Texans
- Position: Nose tackle
- Roster status: Active

Personal information
- Born: February 5, 1998 (age 28); Evanston, Illinois, U.S.
- Listed height: 6 ft 3 in (1.91 m)
- Listed weight: 313 lb (142 kg)

Career information
- High school: Evanston Township
- College: Michigan State (2016–2020)
- NFL draft: 2021: undrafted

Career history
- Tennessee Titans (2021–2023); Arizona Cardinals (2023); Miami Dolphins (2024)*; Arizona Cardinals (2024); Los Angeles Chargers (2025); Houston Texans (2025–2026); Minnesota Vikings (2026)*; San Francisco 49ers (2026); Houston Texans (2026–present)
- * Offseason or practice squad member only

Career NFL statistics as of Week 4, 2026
- Total tackles: 104
- Sacks: 6.5
- Pass deflections: 5
- Stats at Pro Football Reference

Naquan Jones (born February 5, 1998) is an American professional football nose tackle for the Houston Texans of the National Football League (NFL). He played college football for the Michigan State Spartans, and was signed by the Tennessee Titans as an undrafted free agent following the 2021 NFL draft.

== Professional career ==
Pre-draft measurables
Height	Weight	Arm length	Hand span	Wingspan	40-yard dash	10-yard split	20-yard split	20-yard shuttle	Vertical jump	Broad jump	Bench press
6 ft 3 3/8 in (1.91 m)	313 lb (142 kg)	33 in (0.84 m)	9 7/8 in (0.25 m)	6 ft 8 1/8 in (2.04 m)	5.45 s	1.98 s	3.09 s	4.80 s	25.0 in (0.64 m)	8 ft 4 in (2.54 m)	20 reps
All values from Pro Day

=== Tennessee Titans ===
Jones was signed by the Tennessee Titans as an undrafted free agent on May 14, 2021, following the 2021 draft. He made his NFL debut in week four of the 2021 season.

The Titans placed an exclusive rights tender on Jones on March 15, 2023, which he signed the following day.

Jones was waived by the Titans on November 7, 2023.

=== Arizona Cardinals (first stint) ===
On November 10, 2023, Jones was signed to the practice squad of the Arizona Cardinals. He was signed to the active roster on December 5.

On August 27, 2024, Jones was waived by the Cardinals.

=== Miami Dolphins ===
On August 29, 2024, Jones was signed to the Miami Dolphins practice squad.

=== Arizona Cardinals (second stint) ===
On September 25, 2024, Jones was signed by the Arizona Cardinals off the Dolphins practice squad.

=== Los Angeles Chargers ===
On March 13, 2025, Jones signed with the Los Angeles Chargers. He played in eight games before being released on December 8.

=== Houston Texans ===
On December 9, 2025, Jones was claimed off waivers by the Houston Texans.

On March 13, 2026, Jones re-signed with the Texans on a one-year, $2 million contract. He was released by the Texans as a part of final roster cuts on August 30.

=== Minnesota Vikings ===
On September 1, 2026, Jones was signed to the Minnesota Vikings practice squad.

=== San Francisco 49ers ===
On September 23, 2026, Jones was signed by the San Francisco 49ers. He appeared in three games and recorded two tackles for the team during the 2026 season before being released by the 49ers on October 20, 2026. He was re-signed to their practice squad the next day.

=== Houston Texans (second stint) ===
On November 2, 2026, Jones was signed by the Houston Texans off the 49ers practice squad.
