= Darius Hamilton =

American football player (born 1993)

No. 91, 75
- Position: Defensive end

Personal information
- Born: December 29, 1993 (age 32); Woodland Park, New Jersey, U.S.
- Listed height: 6 ft 3 in (1.91 m)
- Listed weight: 286 lb (130 kg)

Career information
- High school: Ramsey (NJ) Don Bosco Prep
- College: Rutgers
- NFL draft: 2017: undrafted

Career history
- Salt Lake Stallions (2019)
- Stats at Pro Football Reference

Darius Hamilton (born December 29, 1993) is an American former professional football defensive end. He attended Rutgers University.

== Early life ==
A native of Woodland Park, New Jersey (formerly known as West Paterson), Hamilton attended powerhouse Don Bosco Preparatory High School in Ramsey, New Jersey, where he was an All-American defensive lineman. Don Bosco won back-to-back New Jersey state championships in 2010 and 2011, finishing the 2011 season as the No. 1 team in the nation according to USA Today. He participated in the 2012 U.S. Army All-American Bowl following his senior season.

Regarded as a five-star recruit by Rivals.com, Hamilton was ranked as the No. 2 strongside defensive end prospect in his class. Labelled New Jersey's most sought-after recruit since Eugene Monroe in 2005, Hamilton picked Rutgers over Miami (FL).

== College career ==
Described as the "gem of the highest-rated recruiting class in Rutgers history", Hamilton was the only true freshman in the regular rotation on offense or defense in 2012. He was named a captain for the 2014 season as a junior.

Hamilton injured his knee on September 27, 2015, causing him to miss the remainder of the season. He returned to Rutgers for a fifth year, conditional on whether he is granted a redshirt.

== Professional career ==
In 2018, Hamilton joined the Salt Lake Stallions of the Alliance of American Football. The league ceased operations in April 2019.

== Personal life ==
Hamilton is the son of Rosita Collazo and Keith Hamilton, who played twelve years in the National Football League for the New York Giants.
