= Tyreek Maddox-Williams =

American football player (born 1997)

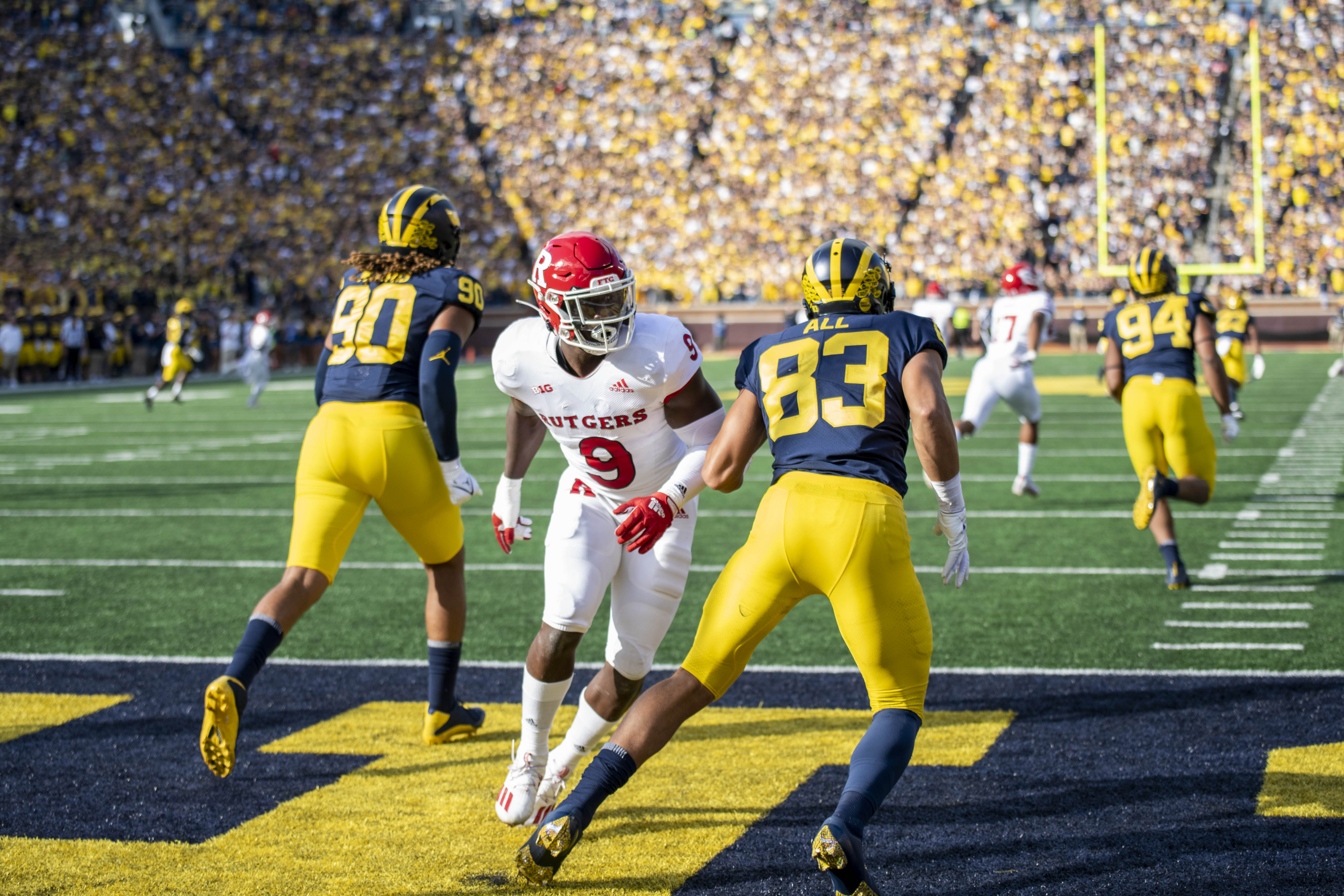
- Maddox-Williams in 2021

Profile
- Position: Linebacker

Personal information
- Born: October 28, 1997 (age 29); Philadelphia, Pennsylvania, U.S.
- Listed height: 6 ft 0 in (1.83 m)
- Listed weight: 228 lb (103 kg)

Career information
- High school: Timber Creek (NJ)
- College: Rutgers (2016–2021)
- NFL draft: 2022: undrafted

Career history
- Los Angeles Chargers (2022)*; Philadelphia Eagles (2023)*; Arizona Cardinals (2023); Atlanta Falcons (2024)*; Buffalo Bills (2024)*
- * Offseason or practice squad member only

Career NFL statistics as of 2024
- Games played: 3
- Stats at Pro Football Reference

Tyreek Maddox-Williams (born October 28, 1997) is an American professional football linebacker. He played college football for the Rutgers Scarlet Knights and has also been a member of the Los Angeles Chargers and Philadelphia Eagles.

== Early life ==
Maddox-Williams was born on October 28, 1997, in Philadelphia, Pennsylvania. He grew up in Philadelphia and attended Timber Creek Regional High School in New Jersey. At Timber Creek, he played football and was named a first-team all-division selection as a senior while totaling 74 tackles, two interceptions and a sack. Ranked a three-star recruit and the 29th-best player in the state by Rivals.com, Maddox-Williams committed to play college football for the Rutgers Scarlet Knights after having flipped from the Buffalo Bulls.

== College career ==
As a true freshman at Rutgers in 2016, Maddox-Williams appeared in 11 games, six as a starter, and was named to ESPN's Freshman All-Big Ten Conference team after recording 47 tackles. He suffered a torn ACL prior to the 2017 season and thus missed it in its entirety. He returned in 2018 and started all 12 games while posting 48 tackles.

In 2019, Maddox-Williams served as team captain and played 12 games, eight as a starter, while tallying 45 tackles, 5.5 tackles-for-loss and 1.5 sacks. He played in nine games, one as a starter, in the 2020 season, having 39 tackles along with three pass breakups. In his final year, the 2021 season, he posted 27 tackles, two pass breakups and a fumble recovery while appearing in eight games. Off the field, Maddox-Williams was a five-time Academic All-Big Ten selection. He was invited to the NFLPA Collegiate Bowl at the conclusion of his Rutgers career.

== Professional career ==
Pre-draft measurables
Height	Weight	Arm length	Hand span	40-yard dash	10-yard split	20-yard split	20-yard shuttle	Vertical jump	Broad jump	Bench press
6 ft 0 1/2 in (1.84 m)	228 lb (103 kg)	30 5/8 in (0.78 m)	9 3/4 in (0.25 m)	4.72 s	1.62 s	2.71 s	4.42 s	38.0 in (0.97 m)	10 ft 0 in (3.05 m)	22 reps
All values from Pro Day

=== Los Angeles Chargers ===
After going unselected in the 2022 NFL draft, Maddox-Williams was signed by the Los Angeles Chargers as an undrafted free agent. He was released at the final roster cuts and then was re-signed to the practice squad. On January 17, 2023, he was signed to a reserve/future contract. He was waived on July 28, 2023.

=== Philadelphia Eagles ===
Maddox-Williams was signed by the Philadelphia Eagles on August 19, 2023. In his only preseason appearance, he recorded seven tackles, two pass breakups, a tackle for loss, and had an interception, which he returned 42 yards against the Indianapolis Colts. He was released by the team at the final roster cuts.

=== Arizona Cardinals ===
On September 13, 2023, Maddox-Williams was signed by the Arizona Cardinals to their practice squad. He was promoted to the active roster on December 20. He finished the season having appeared in three games.

On August 27, 2024, Maddox-Williams was waived by the Cardinals.

=== Atlanta Falcons ===
On October 30, 2024, Maddox-Williams was signed to the Atlanta Falcons practice squad. He was released on December 3.

=== Buffalo Bills ===
On January 8, 2025, Maddox-Williams was signed to the Buffalo Bills practice squad.
