= Drew Mehringer =

American football player and coach (born 1987)

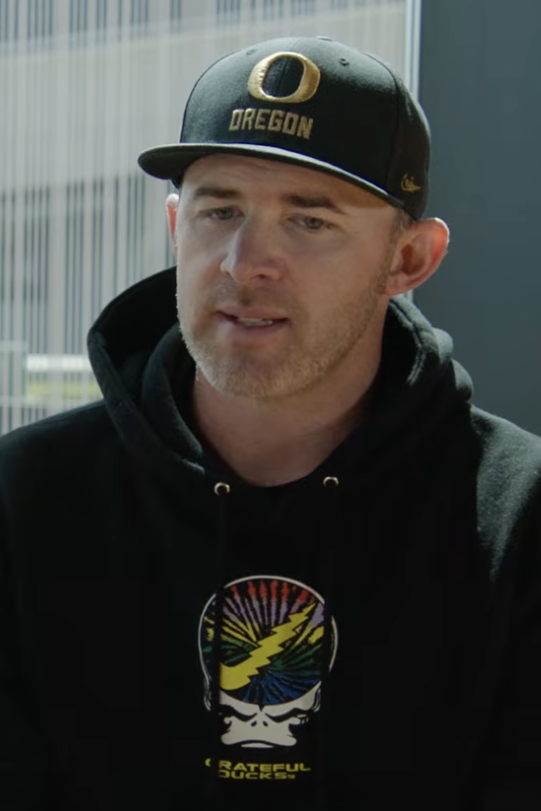
- Mehringer in 2026

Biographical details
- Born: December 10, 1987 (age 38); Arlington, Texas, U.S.

Playing career
- 2006: Rice
- Position: Quarterback

Coaching career (HC unless noted)
- 2007–2009: Rice (SA)
- 2010–2011: Iowa State (GA)
- 2012–2013: Ohio State (GA)
- 2014: James Madison (co-OC/QB)
- 2015: Houston (WR/RC)
- 2016: Rutgers (OC/QB)
- 2017–2019: Texas (PGC/WR)
- 2020: Florida Atlantic (co-OC/WR)
- 2021: New Mexico (co-OC/QB)
- 2022–2025: Oregon (co-OC/TE)
- 2026: Oregon (OC)

Drew Mehringer (born December 10, 1987) is an American college football coach and former player who was most recently the offensive coordinator at the University of Oregon. Mehringer played college football for the Rice Owls as a quarterback in 2006. He has held various assistant coaching positions at Rice University, Iowa State University, Ohio State University, James Madison University, University of Houston, Rutgers University, University of Texas at Austin, Florida Atlantic University, University of New Mexico, and the University of Oregon.

== Early life ==
A native of Mansfield, Texas, Mehringer attended Rice as a quarterback before suffering a career-ending injury. He then served as a student assistant with the quarterbacks under Tom Herman for three seasons (at both Rice and Iowa State), graduating from Rice in 2010 with a degree in political science. Mehringer earned a master's degree in sports management at Ohio State in 2013.

== Coaching career ==
=== Early career ===
After the 2006 NCAA football season, Mehringer switched from a quarterback to a student assistant role at Rice. He earned his degree and left Rice to become a graduate assistant at Iowa State. He moved to Ohio State to serve in the same role in 2012.

=== James Madison ===
In 2014, Mehringer was hired as the offensive coordinator at James Madison University.

=== Houston ===
In 2015, Mehringer was hired by the University of Houston to be their wide receivers coach and recruiting coordinator.

=== Rutgers ===
In 2016, Mehringer was hired by Rutgers University to be their offensive coordinator and quarterbacks coach.

=== Texas ===
On December 12, 2016, Mehringer officially joined the staff at the University of Texas as wide receiver coach and passing game coordinator. On December 1, 2019, Mehringer was let go from his position with Texas.

=== Florida Atlantic ===
In 2020, Mehringer was hired by Florida Atlantic University to be their co-offensive coordinator and wide receivers coach. After initially being shifted to the tight ends coach, Mehringer left Florida Atlantic to University of New Mexico.

=== New Mexico ===
In 2021, Mehringer was hired by the University of New Mexico to be their co-offensive coordinator and quarterbacks coach.

=== Oregon ===
On January 4, 2022, Mehringer was hired by the University of Oregon to be their tight ends coach under head coach Dan Lanning.

On January 15, 2026, Mehringer was promoted to offensive coordinator at the University of Oregon. He was fired on October 25, of the same year.
